= Europe Goalball Championships =

Regional goalball tournament

- Highest governing body: International Blind Sports Federation

Characteristics
- Contact: None
- Mixed-sex: No
- Type: Team sport; ball game; parasport
- Equipment: Goalball; Eyeshades

Presence
- Country or region: Pan-European (and Israel)

IBSA Europe Regional Goalball Championships is one of the four competition regions used for World Championships and Paralympic Games qualification for goalball, a team sport for athletes with a vision impairment. Conducted under the rules of the International Blind Sports Federation (IBSA), the other regions are Africa, America, and Asia-Pacific. Whilst in the West Asia geographic region, Israel competes within the Europe region.

The region has a large number of competitive countries, and under the rules, where there are more than sixteen teams, two 'divisions' are created. As of 2024, Europe has three divisions (A, B, C) for male athletes, and two divisions (A, B) for female athletes. Practice is to generally hold 'Groups' A and C in one year, and Group B the following year; A being the highest ranked.

== Hostings – pre-2002 ==
=== 1983 Greve ===
The 1983 European Championships was held in Greve, Denmark.

There were twelve men's teams: Austria, Belgium, Bulgaria, Denmark, Finland, Great Britain, Germany, Netherlands, Hungary, Poland, Sweden, and Yugoslavia. Austria came first, Yugoslavia second, and Netherlands third.

There were five women's teams: Belgium, Denmark, Finland, Germany, and Netherlands. Denmark came first, Yugoslavia second, and Netherlands third.

=== 1985 Olsztyn ===
The 1985 European Championships was held in Olsztyn, Poland.

There were thirteen men's teams: Austria, Belgium, Bulgaria, Denmark, Finland, France, Great Britain, Germany, Netherlands, Hungary, Italy, Poland, and Yugoslavia. Yugoslavia came first, Germany second, and Hungary third.

There were six women's teams: Bulgaria, Denmark, Finland, Germany, Netherlands, and Poland. Germany came first, Denmark second, and Finland third.

=== 1987 Milton Keynes ===
The 1987 European Championships was held in Milton Keynes, England.

There were twelve men's teams: Austria, Belgium, Denmark, Finland, France, Great Britain, Germany, Netherlands, Hungary, Israel, Sweden, and Yugoslavia. Yugoslavia came first, Netherlands second, and Israel third.

There were five women's teams: Denmark, Finland, Great Britain, Germany, and Netherlands. Denmark came first, Netherlands second, and Great Britain third.

=== 1989 Vejle ===
The 1989 European Championships was held in Vejle, Denmark.

There were eleven men's teams: Austria, Bulgaria, Denmark, Finland, Great Britain, Germany, Netherlands, Hungary, Sweden, USSR, and Yugoslavia. Yugoslavia came first, Germany second, and Finland third.

There were six women's teams: Denmark, Finland, Great Britain, Germany, Netherlands, and Sweden. Denmark came first, Netherlands second, and Germany third.

=== 1991 Lahti ===
The 1991 European Championships was held in Lahti, Finland.

There were fifteen men's teams: Belgium, Bulgaria, Czechoslovakia, Denmark, Finland, France, Great Britain, Germany, Netherlands, Hungary, Israel, Italy, Spain, Sweden, and USSR. Israel came first, Italy second, and Hungary third.

There were eight women's teams: Belgium, Denmark, Finland, Great Britain, Germany, Netherlands, Spain, and Sweden. Sweden came first, Finland second, and Denmark third.

=== 1993 Loughborough ===
The 1993 European Championships was held in Loughborough, England.

There were seventeen men's teams: Croatia, Czech Republic, Denmark, Finland, Great Britain, Germany, Netherlands, Hungary, Israel, Italy, Lithuania, Poland, Russia, Slovenia, Slovakia, and Spain. Finland came first, Czech Republic second, and Italy third.

There were eight women's teams: Belgium, Denmark, Finland, Great Britain, Germany, Netherlands, Spain, and Sweden. Finland came first, Denmark second, and Germany third.

=== 1997 Regionals (Stockholm and Nottingham) ===
Men's division

The men's division of the 1997 European Championships was held in Stockholm, Sweden, with eight men's teams: Denmark, Germany, Hungary, Lithuania, Poland, Slovenia, Spain, and Sweden.

Slovenia came first, Denmark second, and Sweden third.

Women's division

The women's division of the 1997 European Championships was in Nottingham, England, with seven women's teams: Denmark, Finland, Great Britain, Germany, Netherlands, Spain, and Sweden.

Finland came first, Sweden second, and Netherlands third.

=== 1999 Walsall ===
The 1999 European Championships was in Walsall, England.

There were eight men's teams: Denmark, Great Britain, Germany, Hungary, Lithuania, Slovenia, Spain, and Sweden. Denmark came first, Hungary second, and Sweden third.

There were six women's teams: Denmark, Finland, Great Britain, Germany, Netherlands, and Sweden. Finland came first, Sweden second, and Netherlands third.

=== 2001 Regionals (Budapest and Neerpelt) ===
Men's division

The men's division of the 2001 European Championships was held in Budapest, Hungary. There were eight men's teams: Denmark, Finland, Germany, Hungary, Lithuania, Slovenia, Spain, and Sweden.

Hungary came first, Lithuania second, and Germany third.

Women's division

The women's division was held in Neerpelt, Belgium. There were six women's teams: Denmark, Finland, Germany, Netherlands, Spain, and Ukraine.

Netherlands came first, Finland second, and Denmark third.

== Hostings – A division ==
=== 2005 Neerpelt ===
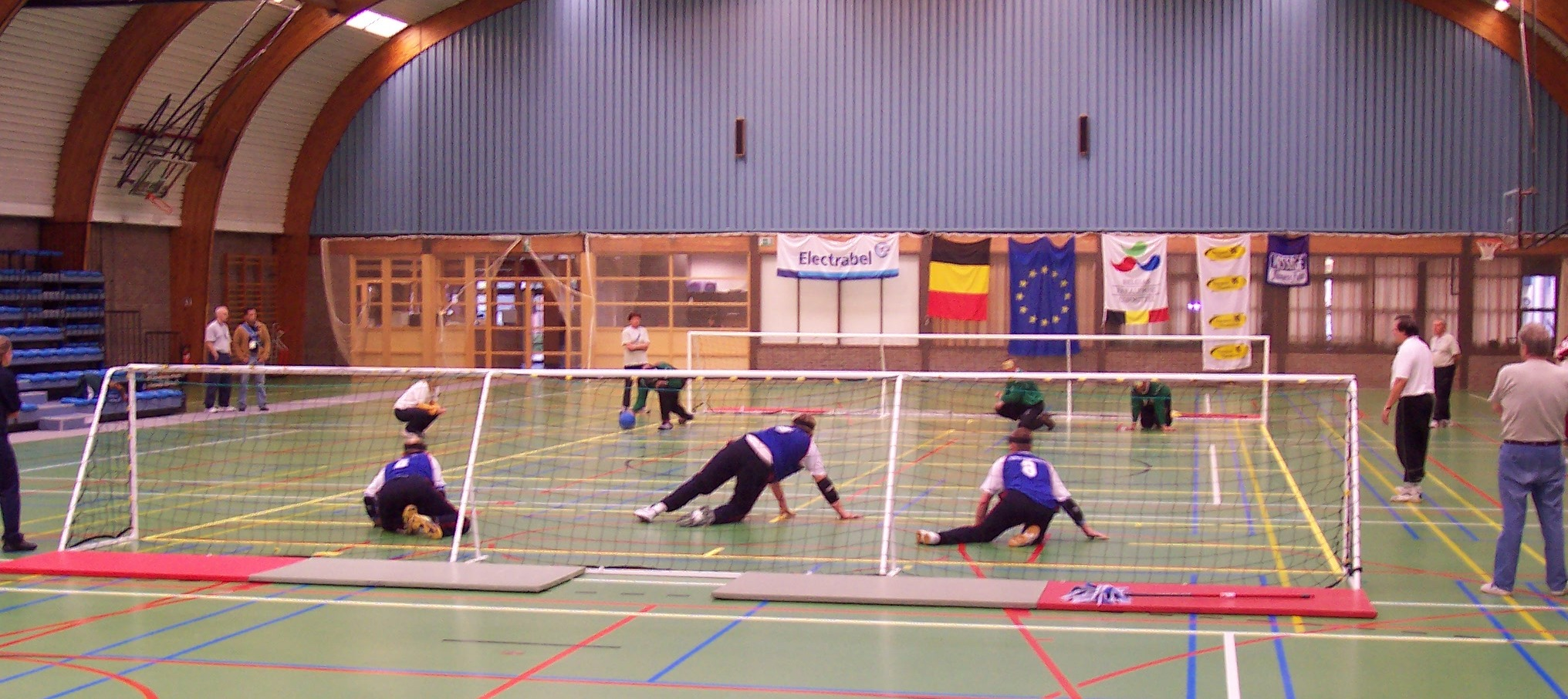
Regional goalball championships, Overpelt, October 2005

The 2005 IBSA European Regional Championships was from 15 to 23 October 2005, in Neerpelt and Overpelt, Belgium. Organised by the Vlaamse Liga Gehandicaptensport vzw (Flemish Sport Federation for Persons with a Disability), games were held in the Provinciaal Domein Dommelhof Sport in Neerpelt, and Sportcentrum De Bemvoort in Overpelt.

There were fourteen men's teams of Groups A and B: Belgium, Czech Republic, Denmark, Finland, Great Britain, Germany, Hungary, Italy, Lithuania, Slovenia, Slovakia, Spain, Sweden, and Ukraine. Denmark came first, Spain second, and Sweden third.

There were ten women's teams: Belarus, Czech Republic, Finland, Great Britain, Germany, Greece, Netherlands, Spain, Sweden, and Ukraine. Germany came first, Denmark second, and Greece third.

=== 2007 Antalya ===
The 2007 IBSA Goalball European Championships, hosted by the Turkish Blind Sports Federation, was at the OHEP Koleji Spor Salonu, Antalya, Turkey.

There were eight men's teams: Belgium, Denmark, Germany, Hungary, Lithuania, Slovenia, Spain, and Sweden. Lithuania came first, Spain second, and Germany third.

There were eleven women's teams: Denmark, Finland, Great Britain, Germany, Greece, Netherlands, Russia, Spain, Sweden, Turkey, and Ukraine. Finland came first, Denmark second, and Ukraine third.

=== 2009 Munich ===
The 2009 European Championships was in Munich, Germany.

There were eight men's teams: Belgium, Denmark, Germany, Hungary, Lithuania, Slovenia, Spain, and Sweden. Lithuania came first, Slovenia second, and Sweden third.

There were eleven women's teams: Denmark, Finland, Great Britain, Germany, Greece, Israel, Russia, Spain, Sweden, Turkey, and Ukraine. Great Britain came first, Denmark second, and Finland third.

=== 2011 Assens ===
The 2011 IBSA European Championships was from 17 to 23 October 2011, in Assens, Denmark.

There were ten men's teams: Belgium, Denmark, Finland, Germany, Hungary, Lithuania, Slovenia, Spain, Sweden, and Turkey. Finland came first, Lithuania second, and Sweden third.

There were ten women's teams: Denmark, Finland, Great Britain, Germany, Israel, Russia, Spain, Sweden, Turkey, and Ukraine. Denmark came first, Russia second, and Sweden third.

=== 2013 Konya ===
The 2013 IBSA Goalball European Championships, Group A, was from 1 to 11 November 2013, at Konya, Turkey.

There were ten men's teams: Belgium, Czech Republic, Finland, Germany, Lithuania, Slovenia, Spain, Sweden, Turkey, and Ukraine. Lithuania came first, Spain second, and Turkey third.

There were ten women's teams: Denmark, Finland, Great Britain, Germany, Israel, Russia, Spain, Sweden, Turkey, and Ukraine. Russia came first, Turkey second, and Israel third.

=== 2015 Kaunas ===
The 2015 IBSA Goalball European A Championships was from 5 to 12 July 2015, in Kaunas, Lithuania. The tournament was organised by the Lithuanian Blind Sports Federation.

There were ten men's teams: Belgium, Czech Republic, Finland, Germany, Lithuania, Slovenia, Spain, Sweden, Turkey, and Ukraine. Turkey came first, Finland second, and Lithuania third.

There were ten women's teams: Denmark, Finland, Germany, Greece, Israel, Russia, Spain, Sweden, Turkey, and Ukraine. Turkey came first, Russia second, and Ukraine third.

=== 2017 Pajulahti ===
The 2017 IBSA Goalball European A Championships was from 15 to 23 September 2017, at Pajulahti, Nastola, Finland.

There were ten men's teams: Belgium, Czech Republic, Finland, Germany, Greece, Lithuania, and Slovenia. Lithuania came first, Germany second, and Belgium third.

There were ten women's teams: Denmark, Finland, Great Britain, Germany, Greece, Israel, and Russia. Russia came first, Turkey second, and Israel third.

=== 2019 Rostock ===
The 2019 IBSA Goalball European A Championships was from 5 to 14 October 2019, in Rostock, Germany.

There were ten men's teams: Belgium, Czech Republic, Finland, Germany, Greece, Lithuania, Spain, Sweden, Turkey, and Ukraine. Germany came first, Ukraine second, and Lithuania third.

There were ten women's teams: Denmark, Finland, Great Britain, Germany, Greece, Israel, Netherlands, Russia, Turkey, and Ukraine. Turkey came first, Israel second, and Germany third.

=== 2021 Samsun ===
The 2021 IBSA Goalball European Championships (Group A) was from Friday 5 to 12 November 2021, in the Yaşar Doğu Sport Hall, Samsun, Turkey.

There were ten men's teams: Belgium, Finland, Germany, Greece, Lithuania, Montenegro, Russia, Spain, Turkey, and Ukraine. Lithuania came first, Ukraine second, and Turkey third.

There were ten women's teams: Denmark, Finland, France, Great Britain, Germany, Greece, Israel, Russia, Turkey, and Ukraine. Russia came first, Turkey second, and Israel third.

=== 2023 Podgorica ===
The 2023 championships were held in Podgorica, Macedonia, from 9 December to 16 December 2023.

There were ten men's teams: Belgium, Finland, Great Britain, Germany, Greece, Israel, Lithuania, Montenegro, Turkey, and Ukraine. Ukraine came first, Lithuania second, and Turkey third.

There were nine women's teams: Finland, France, Great Britain, Germany, Greece, Hungary, Israel, Turkey, and Ukraine. Turkey came first, Israel second, and Greece third.

=== 2025 Lahti ===
The 2025 championships are scheduled to be held in Lahti, Finland, from 28 September 2025 to 6 October 2025.

There are ten men's teams: Finland, Germany, Great Britain, Israel, Lithuania, Montenegro, Poland, Portugal, Turkey, Ukraine.

There are twelve women's teams: Finland, France, Germany, Great Britain, Greece, Hungary, Israel, Italy, Poland, Spain, Turkey, Ukraine.

== Hostings – B division ==
=== 2002 Levoča ===
The 2002 European Championships (Group B) was held in Levoča, Slovakia. There were six men's teams in this division: Croatia, Czech Republic, Great Britain, Slovakia, Spain, and Sweden.

Sweden came first, Spain second, and Czech Republic third.

=== 2006 Prague ===
The 2006 European Championships (Group B) was in Prague, Czech Republic. There were eight men's teams: Belgium, Czech Republic, Finland, Great Britain, Hungary, Italy, Slovakia, and Ukraine.

Belgium came first, Hungary second, and Czech Republic third.

=== 2008 Pajulahti ===
The 2008 IBSA Goalball European Championships (Group B) was from 26 to 30 June 2008, at the Pajulahti, Nastola, Finland. There were eight men's teams: Czech Republic, Denmark, Finland, Great Britain, Italy, Slovenia, Turkey, and Ukraine.

Slovenia came first, Denmark second, and Finland third.

=== 2010 Regionals (Assens and Eskişehir) ===
Men's division

The men's division of the 2010 European Championships was held in Assens, Denmark. There were ten men's teams: Bulgaria, Denmark, Finland, Great Britain, Germany, Israel, Italy, Netherlands, Russia, and Turkey.

Finland came first, Denmark second, and Turkey third.

Women's division

The women's division of the 2010 IBSA European Championships was in July 2010, in Eskişehir, Turkey. There were six women's teams: Hungary, Netherlands, Poland, Spain, Turkey, and Ukraine.

Ukraine came first, Turkey second, and Spain third.

=== 2012 Ascoli Piceno ===
The 2012 IBSA European Championships (Group B) was from 23 to 28 October 2012, in Ascoli Piceno, Italy.

There were ten men's teams: Belgium, Bulgaria, Czech Republic, Denmark, Hungary, Israel, Italy, Poland, Russia, and Ukraine. Czech Republic came first, Belgium second, and Ukraine third.

There were six women's teams: Germany, Great Britain, Greece, Hungary, Netherlands, and Turkey. Turkey came first, Germany second, and Great Britain third.

=== 2014 Budapest ===
The 2014 IBSA Goalball European Regional Championships Group B, was from 24 September 1904 at Budapest, Hungary.

There were ten men's teams: Denmark, Hungary, Israel, Italy, Poland, Portugal, Russia, Slovenia, Sweden, and Ukraine. Slovenia came first, Sweden second, and Ukraine third.

There were six women's teams: Belgium, Denmark, Great Britain, Greece, Hungary, and Sweden. Denmark came first, Sweden second, and Greece third.

=== 2016 Porto ===
The 2016 IBSA Goalball European Regional Championships Group B was from 4 to 8 October 2016 at Maia municipality, Porto, Portugal.

There were ten men's teams: Denmark, Great Britain, Hungary, Israel, Poland, Portugal, Russia, Slovenia, Spain, and Ukraine. Ukraine came first, Great Britain second, and Slovenia third.

There were nine women's teams: Belgium, France, Germany, Great Britain, Greece, Hungary, Netherlands, Portugal, and Spain. Great Britain came first, Germany second, and Greece third.

=== 2018 Chorzów ===
The 2018 IBSA Goalball European Regional Championships Group B was from 22 to 30 September 2018, at Chorzów, Poland.

There were ten men's teams: Great Britain, Greece, Hungary, Israel, Montenegro, Poland, Portugal, Slovenia, Spain, and Ukraine. Ukraine came first, Greece second, and Spain third.

There were nine women's teams: Belgium, Finland, France, Hungary, Netherlands, Poland, Spain, Sweden, and Ukraine. Ukraine came first, Finland second, and Sweden third.

=== 2021 Pajulahti ===
The 2021 IBSA Goalball European B Championships was from 3 June 2021 to 6 June 2021, at Pajulahti, Nastola, Finland. Originally to be hosted in Israel from 15 to 22 October 2021, it was moved to Finland but delayed from January 2021 due to the COVID-19 pandemic.

There were ten men's teams: Great Britain, Greece, Israel, Italy, Montenegro, Poland, Portugal, Romania, Russia, and Sweden. Originally scheduled to attend, Czech Republic and Slovenia were replaced by Italy and Romania. Montenegro came first, Greece second, and Russia third.

There were six women's teams: Denmark, Finland, France, Hungary, Poland, and Spain. Finland came first, Denmark second, and France third.

=== 2022 Matosinhos ===
The Group B Championships were held in Centro de Desportos e Congressos de Matosinhos, Portugal, from 14 to 19 November 2022.

There were ten men's teams: Bulgaria, Denmark, Finland, Great Britain, Greece, Israel, Poland, Portugal, Spain, and Sweden. Israel came first, Greece second, and Finland third.

There were seven women's teams: Finland, Greece, Hungary, Italy, Portugal, Spain, and Ukraine. Finland came first, Greece second, and Ukraine third.

== Hostings – C division ==
=== 2004 Jerusalem ===
The 2004 European Championships (Group C) was in Jerusalem, Israel, from Sunday 1 August 2004. There were seven men's teams in this division: Belgium, Croatia, Nederlands, Israel, Italy, Norway, and Ukraine.

Italy came first, Belgium second, and Ukraine third.

=== 2007 Antalya ===
The 2007 IBSA Goalball European Championships (Group C) was held in Antalya, Turkey. There were nine men's teams: Bulgaria, Croatia, Greece, Israel, Nederlands, Russia, Serbia, Turkey, and Ukraine.

Turkey came first, Ukraine second, and Netherlands third.

=== 2009 Albufeira ===
The C Division was held in Albufeira, Portugal, in late May 2009, with thirteen men's teams: Azerbaijan, Bulgaria, Croatia, Czech Republic, Greece, Israel, Nederlands, Poland, Portugal, Romania, Russia, Slovakia, and Ukraine.

Israel came first, Netherlands second, and Bulgaria third.

=== 2011 Białystok ===
The 2011 IBSA European Goalball Championships was held from 13 to 18 September 2011, in Białystok, Poland, with twelve men's teams: Azerbaijan, Croatia, Czech Republic, Great Britain, Greece, Israel, Moldova, Netherlands, Poland, Romania, Slovakia, and Ukraine.

Czech Republic came first, Poland second, and Ukraine third.

=== 2013 Worcester ===
The 2013 IBSA Goalball European Championships Men C was held from Thursday 5 to Sunday 8 September 2013 in Worcester, England, with nine men's teams: Azerbaijan, Bulgaria, Croatia, Great Britain, Greece, Italy, Netherlands, Portugal, and Russia.

Russia came first, Portugal second, and Italy third.

=== 2015 Malmö ===
In 2015, the C Division was held in Malmö, Sweden, with seven men's teams: Bulgaria, Croatia, Great Britain, Greece, Italy, Portugal, and Russia.

Great Britain came first, Russia second, and Portugal third.

=== 2017 Chișinău ===
The IBSA Goalball European Group C Championships was held from Wednesday 6 to Sunday 10 September 2017, at the FMF Futsal Arena, Ciorescu, near Chișinău, Moldova, with twelve men's teams: Bulgaria, Croatia, Denmark, France, Greece, Italy, Montenegro, Moldova, Netherlands, Portugal, Romania, and Russia. Greece came first, Montenegro second, and Portugal third.

=== 2019 L'Aquila ===
The 2019 IBSA Goalball European C Championships were from Tuesday 29 October to Saturday 2 November 2019, in L'Aquila, Abruzzo region, Italy. There were twelve men's teams: Bulgaria, Croatia, Denmark, France, Hungary, Italy, Montenegro, Netherlands, Romania, Russia, Slovenia, and Slovakia.

Slovenia came first, Montenegro second, and Russia third.

=== 2021 Târgu Mureș ===
The 2021 IBSA Goalball European Championships (Group C) was held from 14 to 21 November 2021 in Târgu Mureș, Romania, hosted by the Romanian Association of the Blind, with eight men's teams: Bulgaria, Denmark, France, Italy, Netherlands, Romania, Serbia, and Sweden.

Denmark came first, Sweden second, and Bulgaria third.

=== 2023 Rotterdam ===
The 2023 IBSA Goalball European - Division C Championships was held at the Rotterdam Ahoy convention centre, Rotterdam, Netherlands, from 10 and 14 August 2023 as part of the 2023 European Para Championships. There were eight men's teams: Azerbaijan, Bulgaria, France, Hungary, Italy, Netherlands, Spain, and Sweden.

Sweden came first, Hungary second, and Spain third.

== Summary of medal winners by championship ==
=== Men ===
1. 1983 – Austria,Yugoslavia,Netherlands
2. 1985 – Yugoslavia,Germany,Hungary
3. 1987 – Yugoslavia,Netherlands,Israel
4. 1989 – Yugoslavia,Germany,Finland
5. 1991 – Israel,Italy,Hungary
6. 1993 – Finland,Czech Republic,Italy
7. 1997 – Slovenia,Denmark,Sweden
8. 1999 – Denmark,Hungary,Sweden
9. 2001 – Hungary,Lithuania,Germany
10. 2005 – Denmark,Spain,Sweden
11. 2007 – Lithuania,Spain,Germany
12. 2009 – Lithuania,Slovenia,Sweden
13. 2011 – Finland,Lithuania,Sweden
14. 2013 – Lithuania,Spain,Turkey
15. 2015 – Turkey,Finland,Lithuania
16. 2017 – Lithuania,Germany,Belgium
17. 2019 – Germany,Ukraine,Lithuania
18. 2021 – Lithuania,Ukraine,Turkey
19. 2023 – Ukraine,Lithuania,Turkey

=== Women ===
1. 1983 – Denmark,Yugoslavia,Netherlands
2. 1985 – Germany,Denmark,Finland
3. 1987 – Denmark,Netherlands,United Kingdom
4. 1989 – Denmark,Netherlands,Germany
5. 1991 – Sweden,Finland,Denmark
6. 1993 – Finland,Denmark,Germany
7. 1997 – Finland,Sweden,Netherlands
8. 1999 – Finland,Sweden,Netherlands
9. 2001 – Netherlands,Finland,Denmark
10. 2005 – Germany,Denmark,Greece
11. 2007 – Finland,Denmark,Ukraine
12. 2009 – United Kingdom,Denmark,Finland
13. 2011 – Denmark,Russia,Sweden
14. 2013 – Russia,Turkey,Israel
15. 2015 – Turkey,Russia,Ukraine
16. 2017 – Russia,Turkey,Israel
17. 2019 – Turkey,Israel,Germany
18. 2021 – Russia,Turkey,Israel
19. 2023 – Turkey,Israel,Greece

== Medal summary ==
Rank	Nation	Gold	Silver	Bronze	Total
1	Denmark (DEN)	6	6	2	14
2	Finland (FIN)	6	3	3	12
3	Lithuania (LTU)	5	3	2	10
4	Turkey (TUR)	4	3	3	10
5	Germany (GER)	3	3	5	11
6	Russia (RUS)	3	2	0	5
6	Yugoslavia (YUG)	3	2	0	5
8	Netherlands (NED)	1	3	4	8
9	Sweden (SWE)	1	2	6	9
10	Israel (ISR)	1	2	4	7
11	Ukraine (UKR)	1	2	2	5
12	Hungary (HUN)	1	1	2	4
13	Slovenia (SLO)	1	1	0	2
14	Great Britain (GBR)	1	0	1	2
15	Austria (AUT)	1	0	0	1
16	Spain (ESP)	0	3	0	3
17	Italy (ITA)	0	1	1	2
18	Czech Republic (CZE)	0	1	0	1
19	Greece (GRE)	0	0	2	2
20	Belgium (BEL)	0	0	1	1
Totals (20 entries)		38	38	38	114

== See also ==
- Goalball World Championships
- Goalball at the Summer Paralympics
