= Denmark women's national goalball team =

Danish national team, for the Paralympic sport of goalball

- Sport: Goalball
- League: IBSA
- Division: Women
- Region: IBSA Europe
- Location: Denmark
- Colours: Red, white
- Championships: Paralympic Games medals: : 1: 1: 1 World Championship medals: : 1: 2: 0

Denmark women's national goalball team is the women's national team of Denmark. Goalball is a team sport designed specifically for athletes with a vision impairment. The team takes part in international competitions.

== Paralympic Games ==
=== 1984 New York ===
The team competed in the 1984 Summer Paralympics at Long Island, New York City, United States of America, where thirteen men's and five women's teams participated. This was the first time women's teams competed, where they finished third.

=== 1988 Seoul ===
The team competed in the 1988 Summer Paralympics, from 15 to 24 October 1988, in Seoul, South Korea. There were fourteen men's and eight women's teams. This was the first time the term "Paralympic" came into official use. The team finished first.

=== 1992 Barcelona ===
The team competed in the 1992 Summer Paralympics, from 3 to 14 September 1992, in the Pavelló de la Vall d'Hebron indoor stadium, Barcelona, Spain. There were twelve men's and eight women's teams. They finished second.

=== 1996 Atlanta ===
The team competed in the 1996 Summer Paralympics, from 16 to 25 August 1996, in the GSU Sports Arena building, Atlanta, Georgia, United States of America. There were twelve men's and eight women's teams. The team finished sixth.

== World Championships ==
IBSA World Goalball Championships have been held every four years from 1978. The women's team regularly represents the country in these championships. Placing first or second in the tournament may earn a berth in the Paralympic Games goalball tournaments.

=== 1982 Indianapolis ===
The team competed in the 1982 World Championships, from Monday 28 June to 1 July 1982, at the Hinkle Fieldhouse, Butler University in Indianapolis, Indiana, United States of America. Organised by United States Association of Blind Athletes, there were twelve men's and six women's teams. They finished second overall.

=== 1986 Roermond ===
The 1986 IBSA World Goalball Championships were held in Roermond, the Netherlands. There were eighteen men's and ten women's teams.

The women's teams were: Australia, Belgium, Canada, Denmark, Egypt, Finland, Germany, Great Britain, Holland, United States.

They finished second overall.

=== 1990 Calgary ===
The team competed in the 1990 World Championships, in Calgary, Alberta, Canada. There were twelve men's and seven women's teams. They finished first overall.

=== 1994 Colorado Springs ===
The team competed in the 1994 World Championships, in Colorado Springs, Colorado, United States of America. There were thirteen men's and nine women's teams. The team finished fourth overall.

=== 1998 Madrid ===
The team competed in the 1998 World Championships, in Madrid, Spain. There were sixteen men's and eleven women's teams. They finished seventh overall.

=== 2002 Rio de Janeiro ===
The team competed in the 2002 World Championships, in Rio de Janeiro, Brazil, from 30 August 2002 to 8 September 2002. There were fourteen men's and ten women's teams. They finished seventh overall.

=== 2022 Matosinhos ===
The team competed in the 2022 World Championships from 7 to 16 December 2022, at the Centro de Desportos e Congressos de Matosinhos, Portugal. There were sixteen men's and sixteen women's teams. They placed fourth in Pool A, and eighth in final standings.

== Regional championships ==
The team competes in the IBSA Europe goalball region.

=== 1985 Olsztyn ===
The team competed at the 1985 European Championships, in Olsztyn, Poland. There were thirteen men's and six women's teams. The team finished second.

=== 2001 Neerpelt ===
The team competed at the women's division of the 2001 European Championships, in Neerpelt, Belgium. The men's division was held in Budapest, Hungary. There were six women's teams, and the team finished third.

=== 2005 Neerpelt (Groups A and B) ===
The team competed in the 2015 IBSA European Regional Championships, from 15 to 23 October 2005, in Neerpelt and Overpelt, Belgium. Organised by the Vlaamse Liga Gehandicaptensport vzw (Flemish Sport Federation for Persons with a Disability), it hosted the fourteen men's teams of Groups A and B, and the ten women teams. Games were held in the Provinciaal Domein Dommelhof Sport in Neerpelt, and Sportcentrum De Bemvoort in Overpelt. The team finished second.

=== 2007 Antalya ===
The team competed at the 2007 IBSA Goalball European Championships, hosted by the Turkish Blind Sports Federation, in Antalya, Turkey with 11 teams contesting the women's competition. The team finished second.

=== 2009 Munich (Group A) ===
The team competed at the 2009 European Championships, in Munich, Germany, with eleven teams taking part. The team finished the event in second place.

=== 2013 Konya (Group A) ===
The team competed in the 2013 IBSA Goalball European Championships, Group A, from 1 to 11 November 2013, at Konya, Turkey. The team finished ninth.

== Competitive history ==
The table below contains individual game results for the team in international matches and competitions.

Year	Event	Opponent	Date	Venue	Team	Team	Winner	Ref
2007	IBSA Goalball European Championships	Russia	25 April	OHEP Koleji Spor Salonu, Anyalya, Turkey	2	9	Denmark	
2007	IBSA Goalball European Championships	Greece	25 April	OHEP Koleji Spor Salonu, Anyalya, Turkey	1	5	Denmark	
2007	IBSA Goalball European Championships	Sweden	26 April	OHEP Koleji Spor Salonu, Anyalya, Turkey	5	0	Denmark	
2007	IBSA Goalball European Championships	Finland	26 April	OHEP Koleji Spor Salonu, Anyalya, Turkey	2	0	Finland	
2007	IBSA Goalball European Championships	Spain	27 April	OHEP Koleji Spor Salonu, Anyalya, Turkey	0	4	Denmark	
2007	IBSA Goalball European Championships	Finland	28 April	OHEP Koleji Spor Salonu, Anyalya, Turkey	1	3	Finland	
2009	IBSA Goalball European Championships	Russia	24 August	Munich, Germany	13	3	Denmark	
2009	IBSA Goalball European Championships	Greece	24 August	Munich, Germany	4	3	Greece	
2009	IBSA Goalball European Championships	Sweden	25 August	Munich, Germany	4	5	Sweden	
2009	IBSA Goalball European Championships	Ukraine	27 August	Munich, Germany	0	6	Denmark	
2009	IBSA Goalball European Championships	Germany	28 August	Munich, Germany	3	4	Denmark	
2009	IBSA Goalball European Championships	Greece	29 August	Munich, Germany	0	2	Denmark	
2009	IBSA Goalball European Championships	Great Britain	29 August	Munich, Germany	7	3	Great Britain	
2013	IBSA Goalball European Championships	Germany	1–11 November	Konya, Turkey	4	3	Germany	
2013	IBSA Goalball European Championships	Israel	1–11 November	Konya, Turkey	6	4	Israel	
2013	IBSA Goalball European Championships	Turkey	1–11 November	Konya, Turkey	3	7	Turkey	
2013	IBSA Goalball European Championships	Spain	1–11 November	Konya, Turkey	3	7	Spain	
2013	IBSA Goalball European Championships	Sweden	7 November	Konya, Turkey	3	6	Denmark	

== Goal scoring by competition ==
Player	Goals	Competition	Notes	Ref
Karina Jorgensen	18	2009 IBSA Goalball European Championships		
Lykke Vedsted	13	2009 IBSA Goalball European Championships		
Maria Kersting	0	2009 IBSA Goalball European Championships		

== See also ==
- Denmark men's national goalball team
