= France women's national goalball team =

French national team, for the Paralympic sport of goalball

- Sport: Goalball
- League: IBSA
- Division: Women
- Region: IBSA Europe
- Location: France
- Championships: Paralympic Games medals: : 0: 0: 0 World Championship medals: : 0: 0: 0

France women's national goalball team is the women's national team of France. Goalball is a team sport designed specifically for athletes with a vision impairment. The team takes part in international competitions.

== Paralympic Games ==
=== 2024 Paris ===
The team may be competing in the 2024 Summer Paralympics, from Wednesday 28 August to Sunday 8 September 2024, in the Stade Pierre de Coubertin, Paris, France. As the host nation, they receive one of the eight slots.

== World Championships ==
IBSA World Goalball Championships have been held every four years from 1978. Placing first or second in the tournament may earn a berth in the Paralympic Games goalball tournaments.

=== 2022 Matosinhos ===
The team competed in the 2022 World Championships from 7 to 16 December 2022, at the Centro de Desportos e Congressos de Matosinhos, Portugal. There were sixteen men's and sixteen women's teams. They placed sixth in Pool A, and twelfth in final standings.

== Regional championships ==
The team competes in the IBSA Europe goalball region. Groups A and C are held one year, and Group B the following year. Strong teams move towards Group A.

=== 2016 Porto (Group B) ===
The team competed in the 2016 IBSA Goalball European Regional Championships Group B, from 4 to 8 October 2016 at Maia municipality, Porto, Portugal. There were ten men's teams and nine women's teams.

There were nine women's teams: Belgium, France, Germany, Great Britain, Greece, Hungary, Netherlands, Portugal, Spain.

The team came seventh, ahead of Hungary and Portugal.

=== 2021 Samsun (Group A) ===
The team competed in the 2021 IBSA Goalball European Championships (Group A), from Friday 5 to 12 November 2021, in the Yaşar Doğu Sport Hall, Samsun, Turkey. Women's teams included: Denmark, Finland, France, Germany, Great Britain, Greece, Israel, Turkey.

The team came fourth of the five women's teams in Group D, and came fifth in the overall standings.

== See also ==
- Parasports
- France men's national goalball team
- France at the Paralympics
