= Goalball at the 1980 Summer Paralympics =

Paralympic sport of goalball at the 1980 Summer Paralympic Games

Goalball at the VI Paralympic Games
- Paralympic Goalball
- Competitors: from 13 nations

Medalists
1st place, gold medalist(s)		West Germany (FRG)
2nd place, silver medalist(s)		United States (USA)
3rd place, bronze medalist(s)		Netherlands (NED)

Goalball at the 1980 Summer Paralympics consisted of a men's team event.

== Medal summary ==
Event	Gold	Silver	Bronze
Men	West Germany (FRG)	United States (USA)	Netherlands (NED)

== Final round ==
Australia also competed in this competition but was disqualified for an unknown reason.

Belgium	1 – 0	Canada

Denmark	1 – 1	Egypt

Austria	3 – 1	Denmark

Canada	1 – 0	Egypt

Austria	3 – 1	Canada

Finland	0 – 0	West Germany

Great Britain	0 – 0	Israel

Netherlands	0 – 1	Yugoslavia

Finland	0 – 2	United States

West Germany	1 – 0	Great Britain

Israel	1 – 0	Netherlands

Yugoslavia	0 – 0	United States

Finland	0 – 0	Great Britain

West Germany	1 – 0	Israel

Austria	0 – 2	West Germany

Belgium	2 – 0	Great Britain

Canada	0 – 3	Israel

== Final standings ==
The men's teams were ranked as:

1. Germany
2. United States
3. Holland
4. Austria
5. Belgium
6. Yugoslavia
7. Finland
8. Israel
9. Canada
10. Denmark
11. Egypt
12. Great Britain
