= Egypt men's national goalball team =

Egyptian national team, for the Paralympic sport of goalball

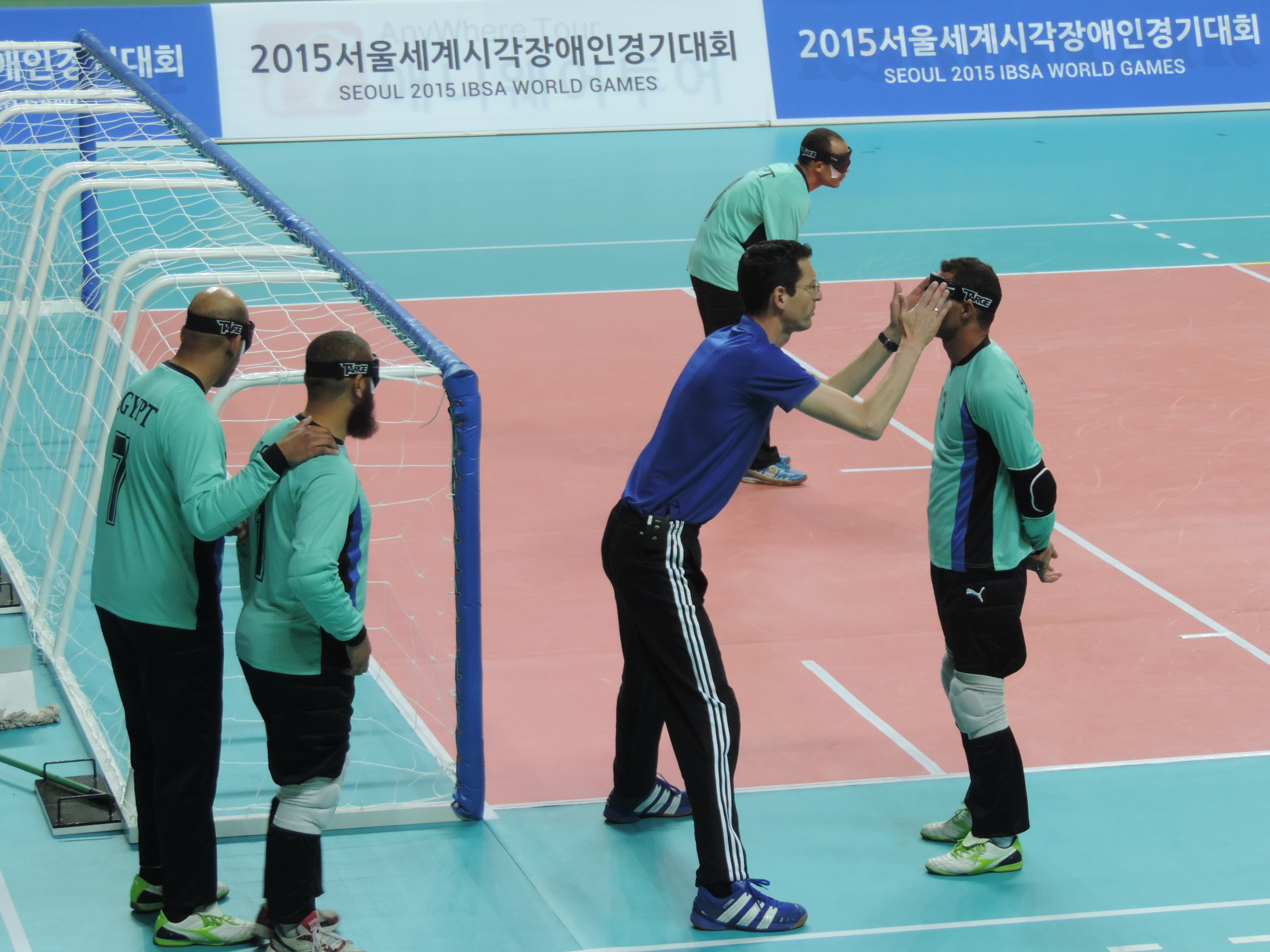
- Egypt men's goalball team. Goalball at the IBSA World Games, Seoul, South Korea (May 2015).
- Sport: Goalball
- League: IBSA
- Division: Men
- Region: IBSA Africa
- Location: Egypt
- Colours: Green, red, black
- Championships: Paralympic Games medals: : 0: 1: 2 World Championship medals:: 0: 0: 2 African goalball Championship medals: : 1: 5: 1

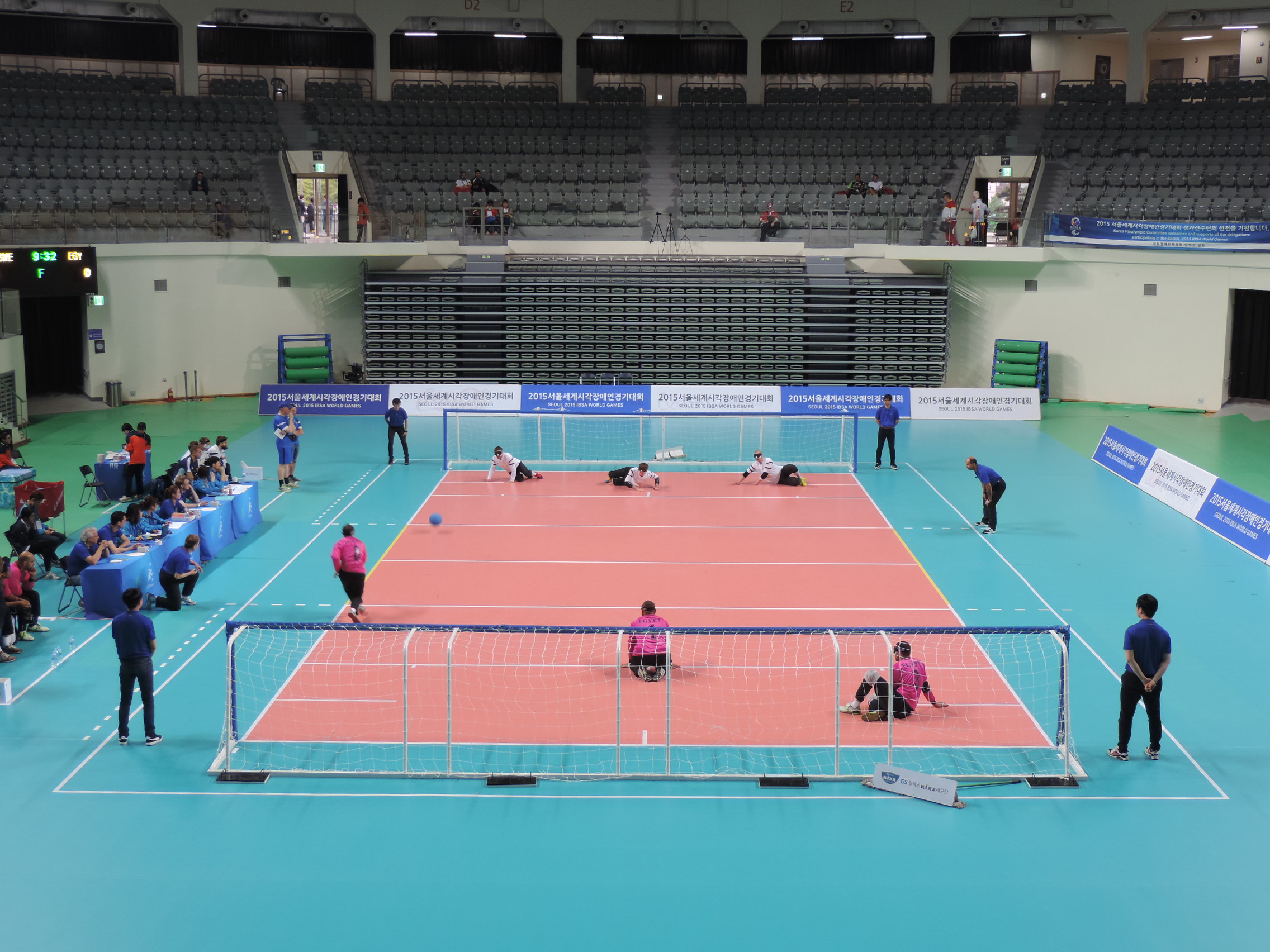
Egypt and Sweden men's goalball teams. Goalball at the IBSA World Games, Seoul, South Korea (May 2015).

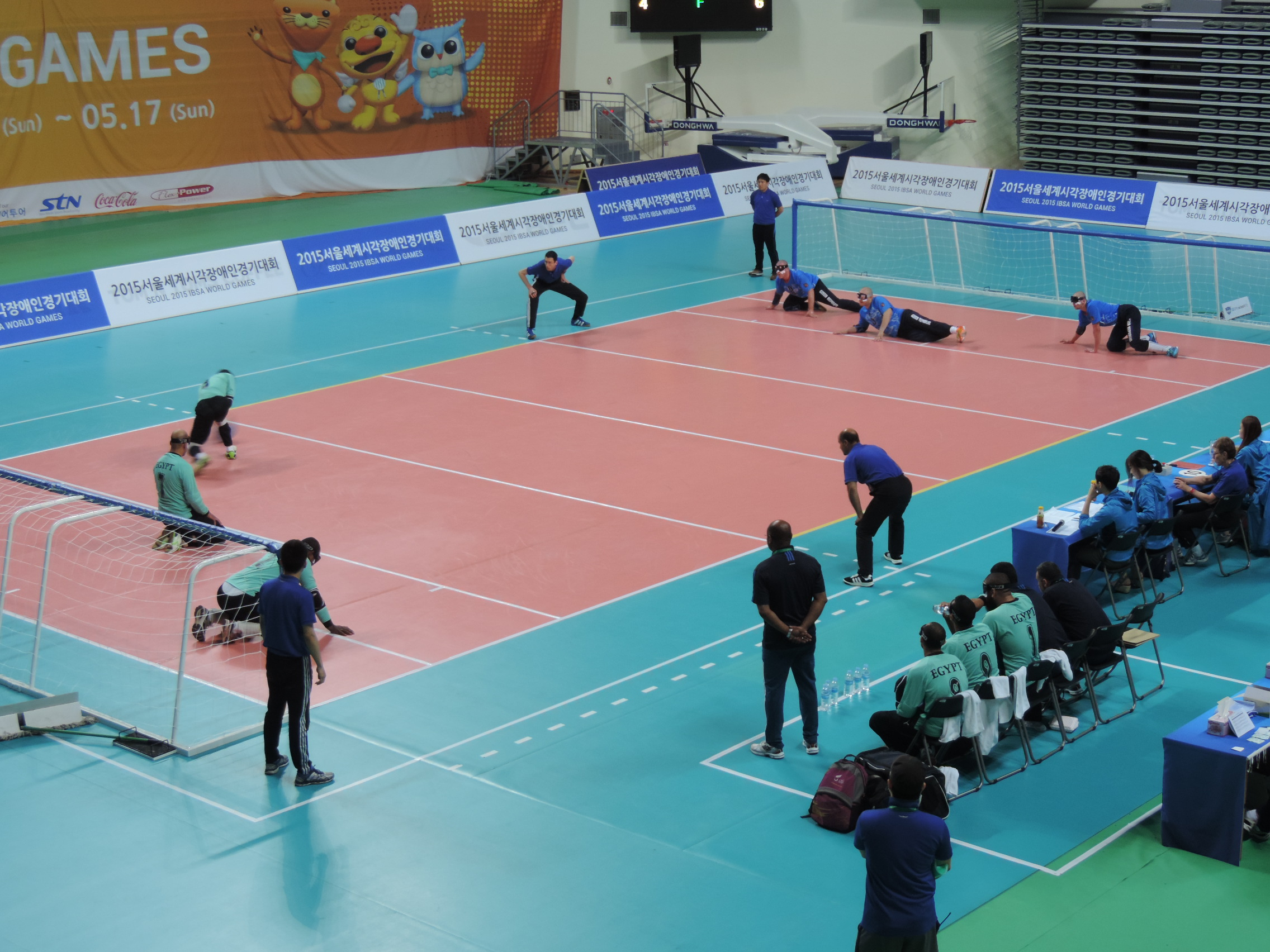
Egypt men's goalball team. Goalball at the IBSA World Games, Seoul, South Korea (May 2015).

Egypt men's national goalball team is the men's national team of Egypt. It takes part in international goalball competitions. Goalball is a team sport designed specifically for athletes with a vision impairment.

== Paralympic Games ==
=== 1988 Seoul ===
The team competed in the 1988 Summer Paralympics, from 15 to 24 October 1988, in Seoul, South Korea. There were fourteen men's and eight women's teams. This was the first time the term "Paralympic" came into official use. The Egyptian goalball athletes were: Ahmed Mamoud Abouzeed, Hussein Mohamed Ahmed, Ahmed Mohamed Aween, El Said Mohamed El Said, Bekhit Gad, and Mohamed Mohamed Sherief.

Egypt came third behind the United States and gold medal winner Yugoslavia.

=== 1992 Barcelona ===
The team competed in the 1992 Summer Paralympics, from 3 to 14 September 1992, in the Pavelló de la Vall d'Hebron indoor stadium, Barcelona, Spain. There were twelve men's and eight women's teams. Athletes were: Bekhit Gad, Elsayed Elsayed, Ahmed Ewein, Mostafa Hussein, Ahmed Moustafa, and Hussen Sayed.

Egypt came third behind Finland and gold medal winner Italy.

=== 1980 Arnhem ===
The team competed in the 1980 Summer Paralympics in Arnhem, Netherlands, where twelve teams took part.

The team finished eleventh.

=== 1984 New York ===
The team competed in the 1984 Summer Paralympics at Long Island, New York City, United States of America, where thirteen teams participated and the team finished second.

== World Championships ==
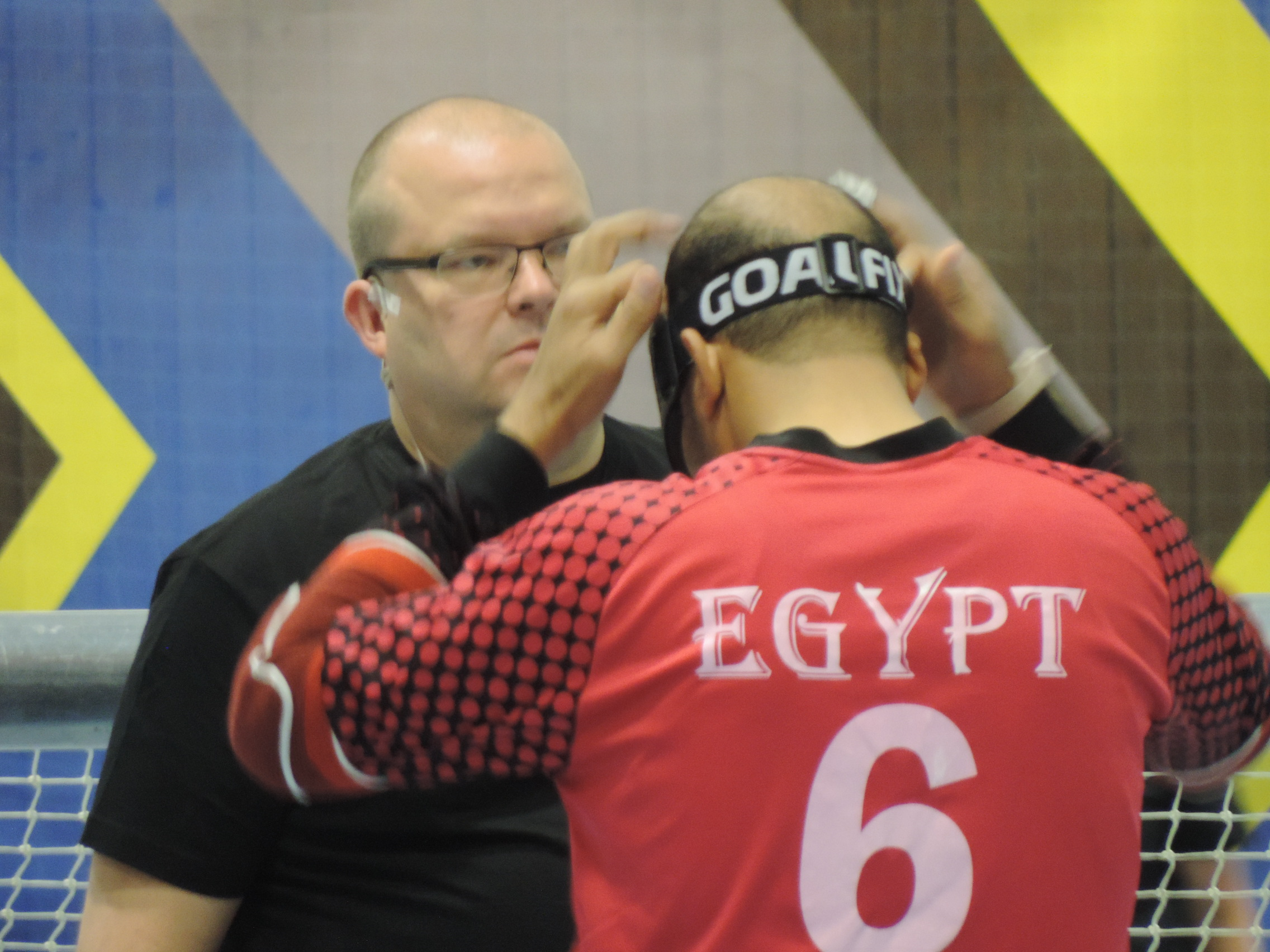
Eyeshade check of player no. 6 at the World Goalball Championships, Malmö, Sweden (2018).

=== 2018 Malmö ===
The team competed in the 2018 World Championships from 3 to 8 June 2018, in Baltiska Hallen, Malmö, Sweden. Athletes included: Hassan Mohammed Hassan Abdelshafy Abdalla, Eltaher Omar Hassan Mahmoud, and Adel Tolba Mohammed.

They placed eighth in Pool B with seven losses, and sixteenth in overall final standings.

=== 2022 Matosinhos ===
The team competed in the 2022 World Championships from 7 to 16 December 2022, at the Centro de Desportos e Congressos de Matosinhos, Portugal. There were sixteen men's and sixteen women's teams. They placed seventh in Pool D, and fifteenth in final standings.

== IBSA World Games ==
=== 2015 Seoul ===
The team competed in the 2015 IBSA World Games from 10 to 17 May 2015, in Seoul, South Korea. There were eight men's and eight women's teams. Jangchung Arena for the men's competition.

== Regional championships ==
The team competes in the IBSA Africa goalball region.

=== 2020 Port Said ===
The team competed at the 2020 IBSA Goalball African Championships, between 2 and 5 March 2020, at Port Said, Egypt, against Algeria and Morocco. This regional tournament would have been a regional championships if Cameroon, Ghana, Kenya, and Niger men's teams had attended as originally indicated.

In the semi-finals, Morocco beat Egypt 15:5, and Algeria took gold.

=== 2021 Cape Coast ===
The team competed at the 2021 IBSA Goalball African Championships, from Monday 6 to Friday 10 December 2021, at the University of Cape Coast Sports Complex, Cape Coast, Ghana. This championships was a qualifier for the 2022 World Championships. Of the six men's teams (Algeria, Cameroon, Egypt, Ghana, Kenya, Nigeria), Egypt took the silver medal behind Algeria.

== See also ==
- Disabled sports
- Egypt women's national goalball team
- Egypt at the Paralympics
