= Ukraine women's national goalball team =

Ukrainian national team, for the Paralympic sport of goalball

Ukraine women's national goalball team is the women's national team of Ukraine. Goalball is a team sport designed specifically for athletes with a vision impairment. The team takes part in international competitions.

== IBSA World Games ==
=== 2003 Quebec City ===
The team competed in the 2003 IBSA World Games from Friday 1 to Sunday 10 August 2011, in Quebec City, Canada. Ten teams competed. The first stage was pool play with 5 teams per pool and the top two teams in each pool advancing to the next round.

=== 2007 São Paulo ===
The team competed in the 2007 IBSA World Games, from 28 July 2007 to 8 August 2007, in São Paulo, Brazil. There were twenty-three men's and twelve women's teams. The competition was a 2008 Summer Paralympics qualifying event. Olena Vertikova was fourth in the competition in scoring with 18 points.

== Regional championships ==
The team competes in the IBSA Europe goalball region.

The 2001 European Championships were held in Neerpelt, Belgium with six teams competing. The team finished sixth. In 2005, the European Championships were held in Neerpelt, Belgium. With ten teams competing, the team finished eighth.

The Turkish Blind Sports Federation hosted the 2007 IBSA Goalball European Championships in Anyalya, Turkey with 11 teams contesting the women's competition. The team finished third. Munich, Germany hosted the 2009 European Championships with eleven teams taking part. The team finished the event in tenth place.

Six teams took part in the 2010 IBSA European Championships Goalball Women B tournament held in Eskişehir, Turkey in July. The team finished first.

The team competed at the 2013 European Championships in Turkey, where they finished sixth.

== Goal scoring by competition ==
Player	Goals	Competition	Notes	Ref
Olena Vertikova	18	2007 IBSA World Championships and Games		
Olga Drogaleluk	4	2007 IBSA World Championships and Games		
Nataliya Melhychenko	3	2009 IBSA Goalball European Championships		
Yaroslava Spitsyna	2	2007 IBSA World Championships and Games		
Nataliya Melhychenko	2	2007 IBSA World Championships and Games		
Yaroslava Spitsyna	1	2009 IBSA Goalball European Championships		
Tetyana Platonova	1	2007 IBSA World Championships and Games		
Beatriz Torets	1	2007 IBSA World Championships and Games		
Nataliya Melhychenko	1	2009 IBSA Goalball European Championships		
Olga Drogalchuk	0	2009 IBSA Goalball European Championships		
Tetyana Platonova	0	2009 IBSA Goalball European Championships		

== Competitive history ==
The table below contains individual game results for the team in international matches and competitions.

Year	Event	Opponent	Date	Venue	Team	Team	Winner	Ref
2003	IBSA World Championships and Games	Spain	7 August	Quebec City, Canada	3	3		
2003	IBSA World Championships and Games	Brazil	7 August	Quebec City, Canada	2	8	Brazil	
2003	IBSA World Championships and Games	Algeria	7 August	Quebec City, Canada	1	8	Ukraine	
2003	IBSA World Championships and Games	China	7 August	Quebec City, Canada	4	5	China	
2007	IBSA Goalball European Championships	Spain	25 April	OHEP Koleji Spor Salonu, Anyalya, Turkey	2	6	Spain	
2007	IBSA Goalball European Championships	Netherlands	25 April	OHEP Koleji Spor Salonu, Anyalya, Turkey	6	5	Ukraine	
2007	IBSA Goalball European Championships	Great Britain	26 April	OHEP Koleji Spor Salonu, Anyalya, Turkey	5	2	Ukraine	
2007	IBSA Goalball European Championships	Turkey	26 April	OHEP Koleji Spor Salonu, Anyalya, Turkey	1	6	Ukraine	
2007	IBSA Goalball European Championships	Germany	27 April	OHEP Koleji Spor Salonu, Anyalya, Turkey	2	6	Ukraine	
2007	IBSA Goalball European Championships	Finland	27 April	OHEP Koleji Spor Salonu, Anyalya, Turkey	1	2	Finland	
2007	IBSA Goalball European Championships	Spain	28 April	OHEP Koleji Spor Salonu, Anyalya, Turkey	1	3	Ukraine	
2007	IBSA World Championships and Games	Australia	31 July	Brazil	1	4	Australia	
2007	IBSA World Championships and Games	South Korea	31 July	Brazil	14	4	Ukraine	
2007	IBSA World Championships and Games	Japan	2 August	Brazil	4	2	Japan	
2007	IBSA World Championships and Games	Brazil	3 August	Brazil	7	1	Brazil	
2007	IBSA World Championships and Games	Spain	4 August	Brazil	3	2	Ukraine	
2007	IBSA World Championships and Games	Sweden	5 August	Brazil	6	5	Sweden	
2009	IBSA Goalball European Championships	Greece	24 August	Munich, Germany	2	0	Greece	
2009	IBSA Goalball European Championships	Russia	25 August	Munich, Germany	4	4		
2009	IBSA Goalball European Championships	Sweden	26 August	Munich, Germany	0	7	Sweden	
2009	IBSA Goalball European Championships	Denmark	27 August	Munich, Germany	0	6	Denmark	
2009	IBSA Goalball European Championships	Spain	27 August	Munich, Germany	3	1	Spain	
2009	IBSA Goalball European Championships	Turkey	28 August	Munich, Germany	1	3	Ukraine	
2010	IBSA European Championships Goalball Women B	Netherlands	8 July	Eskişehir, Turkey	8	0	Ukraine	
2013	IBSA Goalball European Championships	Sweden	1–11 November	Konya, Turkey	3	9	Ukraine	
2013	IBSA Goalball European Championships	Great Britain	1–11 November	Konya, Turkey	5	2	Ukraine	
2013	IBSA Goalball European Championships	Finland	1–11 November	Konya, Turkey	5	0	Finland	
2013	IBSA Goalball European Championships	Russia	1–11 November	Konya, Turkey	2	9	Russia	
2013	IBSA Goalball European Championships	Israel	7 November	Konya, Turkey	5	4	Israel	
2013	IBSA Goalball European Championships	Great Britain	8 November	Konya, Turkey	2	1	Ukraine	
2013	IBSA Goalball European Championships	Germany	8 November	Konya, Turkey	3	9	Germany	

== See also ==
- Disabled sports
- Ukraine men's national goalball team
- Ukraine at the Paralympics
