= Italy men's national goalball team =

Italian national team, for the Paralympic sport of goalball

La Nazionale Italiana di Goalball
- Sport: Goalball
- League: IBSA
- Division: Men
- Region: IBSA Europe
- Location: Italy
- Colours: Blue, white
- Championships: Paralympic Games medals: : 1: 0: 0 World Championship medals: : 0: 2: 0

Italy men's national goalball team is the men's national team of Italy. Goalball is a team sport designed specifically for athletes with a vision impairment. The team takes part in international goalball competitions.

== Paralympic Games ==
=== 1984 New York ===
The team competed in the 1984 Summer Paralympics at Long Island, New York City, United States of America, where thirteen men's and five women's teams participated. The team finished fourth.

=== 1992 Barcelona ===
The team competed in the 1992 Summer Paralympics, from 3 to 14 September 1992, in the Pavelló de la Vall d'Hebron indoor stadium, Barcelona, Spain. There were twelve men's and eight women's teams. Italy was the gold medal winner, ahead of Finland and bronze medal winner Egypt.

Athletes were: Natale Castellini, Roberto Gallucci, Paolo Martini, Dario Merelli, and Hubert Perfler.

== Regional championships ==
The team competes in the IBSA Europe goalball region. Groups A and C are held one year, and Group B the following year. Strong teams move towards Group A.

=== 2005 Neerpelt (Groups A and B) ===
The team competed in the 2015 IBSA European Regional Championships, from 15 to 23 October 2005, in Neerpelt and Overpelt, Belgium. Organised by the Vlaamse Liga Gehandicaptensport vzw (Flemish Sport Federation for Persons with a Disability), it hosted the fourteen men's teams of Groups A and B, and the ten women teams. Games were held in the Provinciaal Domein Dommelhof Sport in Neerpelt, and Sportcentrum De Bemvoort in Overpelt.

=== 2021 Pajulahti (Group B) ===
The team competed in the 2021 IBSA Goalball European B Championships, from 3 June 2021 to 6 June 2021, at Pajulahti, Nastola, Finland. Originally to be hosted in Israel from 15 to 22 October 2021, it was moved to Finland but delayed from January 2021 due to the COVID-19 pandemic. Men's teams are (Group A) Greece, Portugal, Israel, Russia and Romania, and (Group B) Great Britain, Italy, Montenegro, Poland, and Sweden. Women's teams are host nation Finland, Denmark, Hungary, France, Poland, and Spain. Romania and Italy stepped in to replace Czech Republic and Slovenia, who elected not to attend.

== See also ==
- Disabled sports
- Italy women's national goalball team
- Italy at the Paralympics
