= Finland women's national goalball team =

Finnish national team, for the Paralympic sport of goalball

Finland women's national goalball team is the women's national team of Finland. Goalball is a team sport designed specifically for athletes with a vision impairment. The team takes part in international competitions.

== Paralympic Games ==
The team competed at the 1992 Summer Paralympics in Barcelona, where they finished first. At the 1996 Summer Paralympics in Atlanta, Georgia, the team finished second. The team competed at the 2000 Summer Paralympics in Sydney, where they finished fourth. At the 2004 Summer Paralympics in Athens, Greece, the team finished fourth.

== World Championships ==
The 1986 World Championships were held in Roermond, the Netherlands. The team was one of ten teams participating, and they finished fourth overall. The 1990 World Championships were held in Calgary, Alberta, Canada. The team was one of seven teams participating, and they finished third overall. The 1994 World Championships were held in Colorado Springs, Colorado. The team was one of nine teams participating, and they finished first overall. The 1998 World Championships were held in Madrid, Spain. The team was one of eleven teams participating, and they finished first overall.

== IBSA World Games ==
The 2003 IBSA World Games were held in Quebec City, Canada with 10 teams competing. The first stage was pool play with 5 teams per pool and the top two teams in each pool advancing to the next round. The team made it out of the round robin round. Finland finished first after winning 1 to 0 in over time against Brazil. The 2007 IBSA World Championships and Games were held in Brazil. The women's goalball competition included thirteen teams, including this one. The competition was a 2008 Summer Paralympics qualifying event. Páiri Tolpanen was fourth in the competition in scoring with 18 points. Katja Heikkinen was ninth in the competition in scoring with 12 points.

== Regional championships ==
The team competes in the IBSA Europe goalball region.

The 1985 European Championships were held in Olsztyn, Poland with six teams competing. The team finished third. The 2001 European Championships were held in Neerpelt, Belgium with six teams competing. The team finished second. In 2005, the European Championships were held in Neerpelt, Belgium. With ten teams competing, the team finished sixth. The Turkish Blind Sports Federation hosted the 2007 IBSA Goalball European Championships in Anyalya, Turkey with 11 teams contesting the women's competition. The team finished first. Munich, Germany hosted the 2009 European Championships with eleven teams taking part. The team finished the event in third place. Senni Posio was the only team member to play and not score a goal.

The team competed at the 2013 European Championships in Turkey, where they finished fourth.

== Goal scoring by competition ==
Player	Goals	Competition	Notes	Ref
Páiri Tolpanen	20	2009 IBSA Goalball European Championships		
Katja Heikkinen	20	2009 IBSA Goalball European Championships		
Páiri Tolpanen	18	2007 IBSA World Championships and Games		
Katja Heikkinen	12	2007 IBSA World Championships and Games		
Krista Leppanen	1	2007 IBSA World Championships and Games		
Heidi Koivunen	1	2007 IBSA World Championships and Games		
Krista Leppanen	1	2009 IBSA Goalball European Championships		
Senni Posio	0	2009 IBSA Goalball European Championships	Played in all but one game and did not play in finals	

== Competitive history ==
The table below contains individual game results for the team in international matches and competitions.

Year	Event	Opponent	Date	Venue	Team	Team	Winner	Ref
2003	IBSA World Championships and Games	Turkey	7 August	Quebec City, Canada	11	1	Finland	
2003	IBSA World Championships and Games	Sweden	7 August	Quebec City, Canada	2	1	Finland	
2003	IBSA World Championships and Games	Japan	7 August	Quebec City, Canada	6	6		
2003	IBSA World Championships and Games	South Korea	7 August	Quebec City, Canada	8	1	Finland	
2003	IBSA World Championships and Games	Spain	10 August	Quebec City, Canada	2	1	Finland	
2003	IBSA World Championships and Games	Brazil	10 August	Quebec City, Canada	1 OT	0 OT	Finland	
2007	IBSA Goalball European Championships	Sweden	25 April	OHEP Koleji Spor Salonu, Anyalya, Turkey	2	5	Finland	
2007	IBSA Goalball European Championships	Russia	25 April	OHEP Koleji Spor Salonu, Anyalya, Turkey	1	11	Finland	
2007	IBSA Goalball European Championships	Denmark	26 April	OHEP Koleji Spor Salonu, Anyalya, Turkey	2	0	Finland	
2007	IBSA Goalball European Championships	Greece	26 April	OHEP Koleji Spor Salonu, Anyalya, Turkey	2	0	Greece	
2007	IBSA Goalball European Championships	Ukraine	27 April	OHEP Koleji Spor Salonu, Anyalya, Turkey	1	2	Finland	
2007	IBSA Goalball European Championships	Denmark	28 April	OHEP Koleji Spor Salonu, Anyalya, Turkey	1	3	Finland	
2007	IBSA World Championships and Games	Iran	31 July	Brazil	7	5	Finland	
2007	IBSA World Championships and Games	Greece	1 August	Brazil	0	3	Finland	
2007	IBSA World Championships and Games	Sweden	2 August	Brazil	6	3	Sweden	
2007	IBSA World Championships and Games	Italy	2 August	Brazil	1	11	Finland	
2007	IBSA World Championships and Games	Germany	3 August	Brazil	2	3	Germany	
2007	IBSA World Championships and Games	Great Britain	4 August	Brazil	3	4	Great Britain	
2007	IBSA World Championships and Games	Brazil	5 August	Brazil	3	4	Brazil	
2009	IBSA Goalball European Championships	Israel	24 August	Munich, Germany	1	4	Finland	
2009	IBSA Goalball European Championships	Great Britain	24 August	Munich, Germany	10	3	Finland	
2009	IBSA Goalball European Championships	Germany	25 August	Munich, Germany	4	2	Finland	
2009	IBSA Goalball European Championships	Turkey	26 August	Munich, Germany	5	10	Finland	
2009	IBSA Goalball European Championships	Spain	27 August	Munich, Germany	7	1	Finland	
2009	IBSA Goalball European Championships	Sweden	28 August	Munich, Germany	7	3	Finland	
2009	IBSA Goalball European Championships	Great Britain	29 August	Munich, Germany	7	5	Great Britain	
2009	IBSA Goalball European Championships	Greece	29 August	Munich, Germany	4	1	Finland	
2013	IBSA Goalball European Championships	Sweden	1–11 November	Konya, Turkey	2	8	Finland	
2013	IBSA Goalball European Championships	Ukraine	1–11 November	Konya, Turkey	5	0	Finland	
2013	IBSA Goalball European Championships	Russia	1–11 November	Konya, Turkey	5	5		
2013	IBSA Goalball European Championships	Great Britain	1–11 November	Konya, Turkey	9	3	Finland	
2013	IBSA Goalball European Championships	Spain	7 November	Konya, Turkey	9	3	Finland	
2013	IBSA Goalball European Championships	Turkey	7 November	Konya, Turkey	5	4	Turkey	
2013	IBSA Goalball European Championships	Israel	8 November	Konya, Turkey	3	5	Israel	

== See also ==
- Finland men's national goalball team
