= Greece women's national goalball team =

Greece national team, for the Paralympic sport of goalball

Greece women's national goalball team is the women's national team of Greece. Goalball is a team sport designed specifically for athletes with a vision impairment. The team takes part in international competitions.

== Paralympic Games ==
=== 2004 Athens ===
The team competed in 2004 Summer Paralympics, from 17 and 28 September 2004, in the Faliro Sports Pavilion Arena, Athens, Greece. There were twelve men's and eight women's teams.

The team finished eighth.

== Regional championships ==
The team competes in the IBSA Europe goalball region.

In 2005, the European Championships were held in Neerpelt, Belgium. With ten teams competing, the team finished third. The Turkish Blind Sports Federation hosted the 2007 IBSA Goalball European Championships in Anyalya, Turkey with 11 teams contesting the women's competition. The team finished eighth. Munich, Germany hosted the 2009 European Championships with eleven teams taking part. The team finished the event in fourth place.

== Goal scoring by competition ==
Player	Goals	Competition	Notes	Ref
Maria Tzalla	12	2007 IBSA World Championships and Games		
Maria Tzalla	5	2009 IBSA Goalball European Championships		
Vouziana Giota	5	2007 IBSA World Championships and Games		
Konstania Driva	5	2009 IBSA Goalball European Championships		
Katerina Lorentzov	3	2007 IBSA World Championships and Games		
Etella Iliopoulou	3	2007 IBSA World Championships and Games		
Athina Kontozorov	2	2007 IBSA World Championships and Games		
Theodora Paschalidou	0	2009 IBSA Goalball European Championships		
Christina Blavaki	0	2009 IBSA Goalball European Championships		
Katerina Lorentzov	0	2009 IBSA Goalball European Championships		

== Competitive history ==
The table below contains individual game results for the team in international matches and competitions.

Year	Event	Opponent	Date	Venue	Team	Team	Winner	Ref
2007	IBSA Goalball European Championships	Sweden	25 April	OHEP Koleji Spor Salonu, Antalya, Turkey	2	1	Sweden	
2007	IBSA Goalball European Championships	Denmark	25 April	OHEP Koleji Spor Salonu, Antalya, Turkey	1	5	Denmark	
2007	IBSA Goalball European Championships	Russia	26 April	OHEP Koleji Spor Salonu, Antalya, Turkey	2	10	Greece	
2007	IBSA Goalball European Championships	Finland	26 April	OHEP Koleji Spor Salonu, Antalya, Turkey	2	0	Greece	
2007	IBSA Goalball European Championships	Netherlands	27 April	OHEP Koleji Spor Salonu, Antalya, Turkey	2	1	Netherlands	
2007	IBSA World Championships and Games	Great Britain	31 July	Brazil	1	4	Great Britain	
2007	IBSA World Championships and Games	Iran	1 August	Brazil	4	4		
2007	IBSA World Championships and Games	Finland	1 August	Brazil	0	3	Finland	
2007	IBSA World Championships and Games	Sweden	3 August	Brazil	6	3	Greece	
2007	IBSA World Championships and Games	Italy	3 August	Brazil	2	12	Greece	
2007	IBSA World Championships and Games	Germany	4 August	Brazil	2	1	Germany	
2009	IBSA Goalball European Championships	Ukraine	24 August	Munich, Germany	2	0	Greece	
2009	IBSA Goalball European Championships	Denmark	24 August	Munich, Germany	4	3	Greece	
2009	IBSA Goalball European Championships	Sweden	25 August	Munich, Germany	1	1		
2009	IBSA Goalball European Championships	Russia	26 August	Munich, Germany	1	2	Greece	
2009	IBSA Goalball European Championships	Israel	28 August	Munich, Germany	1	2	Greece	
2009	IBSA Goalball European Championships	Denmark	29 August	Munich, Germany	0	2	Denmark	
2009	IBSA Goalball European Championships	Finland	29 August	Munich, Germany	4	1	Finland	

== See also ==
- Disabled sports
- Greece at the Paralympics
