= Germany women's national goalball team =

German national team, for the Paralympic sport of goalball

- Sport: Goalball
- League: IBSA
- Division: Women
- Region: IBSA Europe
- Location: Germany
- Colours: White, black
- Championships: Paralympic Games medals: :1:0:0; World Championship medals: :0:1:0

Germany women's national goalball team is the women's national team of Germany. Goalball is a team sport designed specifically for athletes with a vision impairment. The team takes part in international goalball competitions.

== Paralympic Games ==
At the 1988 Summer Paralympics, the team finished fifth. The team competed at the 1992 Summer Paralympics in Barcelona, where they finished sixth. At the 1996 Summer Paralympics in Atlanta, Georgia, the team finished first. At the 2004 Summer Paralympics in Athens, Greece, the team finished sixth.

== World Championships ==
The 1986 World Championships were held in Roermond, the Netherlands. The team was one of ten teams participating, and they finished fifth overall. The 1990 World Championships were held in Calgary, Alberta, Canada. The team was one of seven teams participating, and they finished fourth overall. The 1994 World Championships were held in Colorado Springs, Colorado. The team was one of nine teams participating, and they finished second overall. The 1998 World Championships were held in Madrid, Spain. The team was one of eleven teams participating, and they finished eighth overall. The 2002 World Championships were held in Rio de Janeiro, Brazil. The team was one of ten teams participating, and they finished fourth overall.

== IBSA World Games ==
The 2007 IBSA World Championships and Games were held in Brazil. The women's goalball competition included thirteen teams, including this one. The competition was a 2008 Summer Paralympics qualifying event. Iva Fisher was third in the competition in scoring with 22 points.

== Regional championships ==
The team competes in the IBSA Europe goalball region.

The 1985 European Championships were held in Olsztyn, Poland with six teams competing. The team finished first. The 2001 European Championships were held in Neerpelt, Belgium with six teams competing. The team finished fourth. In 2005, the European Championships were held in Neerpelt, Belgium. With ten teams competing, the team finished first. The Turkish Blind Sports Federation hosted the 2007 IBSA Goalball European Championships in Anyalya, Turkey with 11 teams contesting the women's competition. The team finished fifth. Munich, Germany hosted the 2009 European Championships with eleven teams taking part. The team finished the event in seventh place. The team competed at the 2013 European Championships in Turkey, where they finished fifth.

== Goal scoring by competition ==
Player	Goals	Competition	Notes	Ref
Iva Fisher	22	2007 IBSA World Championships and Games		
Cristiane Möller	11	2007 IBSA World Championships and Games		
Conny Dietz	10	2007 IBSA World Championships and Games		
Natalie Ball	8	2007 IBSA World Championships and Games		
Swetlana Otto	8	2009 IBSA Goalball European Championships		
Christiane Möller	5	2009 IBSA Goalball European Championships		
Stefanie Schindler	1	2009 IBSA Goalball European Championships		
Sarah Schacht	1	2009 IBSA Goalball European Championships		
Conny Dietz	1	2009 IBSA Goalball European Championships		
Charlotte Kärcher	0	2009 IBSA Goalball European Championships		

== Competitive history ==
The table below contains individual game results for the team in international matches and competitions.

Year	Event	Opponent	Date	Venue	Team	Team	Winner	Ref
2007	IBSA Goalball European Championships	Turkey	25 April	OHEP Koleji Spor Salonu, Anyalya, Turkey	0	5	Germany	
2007	IBSA Goalball European Championships	Great Britain	25 April	OHEP Koleji Spor Salonu, Anyalya, Turkey	1	2	Germany	
2007	IBSA Goalball European Championships	Spain	26 April	OHEP Koleji Spor Salonu, Anyalya, Turkey	1	3	Spain	
2007	IBSA Goalball European Championships	Netherlands	26 April	OHEP Koleji Spor Salonu, Anyalya, Turkey	2	5	Germany	
2007	IBSA Goalball European Championships	Ukraine	27 April	OHEP Koleji Spor Salonu, Anyalya, Turkey	2	6	Ukraine	
2007	IBSA Goalball European Championships	Sweden	27 April	OHEP Koleji Spor Salonu, Anyalya, Turkey	4	3	Germany	
2007	IBSA World Championships and Games	Sweden	31-Jul	Brazil	6	5	Germany	
2007	IBSA World Championships and Games	Italy	1-August	Brazil	12	2	Germany	
2007	IBSA World Championships and Games	Great Britain	2 August	Brazil	1	5	Germany	
2007	IBSA World Championships and Games	Iran	2 August	Brazil	5	13	Germany	
2007	IBSA World Championships and Games	Finland	3 August	Brazil	2	3	Germany	
2007	IBSA World Championships and Games	Greece	4 August	Brazil	2	1	Germany	
2007	IBSA World Championships and Games	Spain	5 August	Brazil	3	0	Germany	
2007	IBSA World Championships and Games	Japan	5 August	Brazil	2	1	Germany	
2007	IBSA World Championships and Games	Sweden	6 August	Brazil	6	3	Germany	
2009	IBSA Goalball European Championships	Turkey	24 August	Munich, Germany	6	3	Germany	
2009	IBSA Goalball European Championships	Great Britain	25 August	Munich, Germany	2	9	Great Britain	
2009	IBSA Goalball European Championships	Finland	25 August	Munich, Germany	4	2	Finland	
2009	IBSA Goalball European Championships	Germany	26 August	Munich, Germany	1	1		
2009	IBSA Goalball European Championships	Israel	26 August	Munich, Germany	0	4	Germany	
2009	IBSA Goalball European Championships	Denmark	28 August	Munich, Germany	3	4	Denmark	
2009	IBSA Goalball European Championships	Russia	29 August	Munich, Germany	4	1	Germany	
2013	IBSA Goalball European Championships	Turkey	1–11 November	Konya, Turkey	12	6	Germany	
2013	IBSA Goalball European Championships	Spain	1–11 November	Konya, Turkey	2	3	Spain	
2013	IBSA Goalball European Championships	Denmark	1–11 November	Konya, Turkey	4	3	Germany	
2013	IBSA Goalball European Championships	Israel	1–11 November	Konya, Turkey	1	8	Israel	
2013	IBSA Goalball European Championships	Russia	1–11 November	Konya, Turkey	3	1	Russia	
2013	IBSA Goalball European Championships	Spain	8 November	Konya, Turkey	5	12	Germany	
2013	IBSA Goalball European Championships	Ukraine	8 November	Konya, Turkey	3	9	Germany	

== See also ==
- Germany men's national goalball team
