= Algeria women's national goalball team =

Algerian national team, for the Paralympic sport of goalball

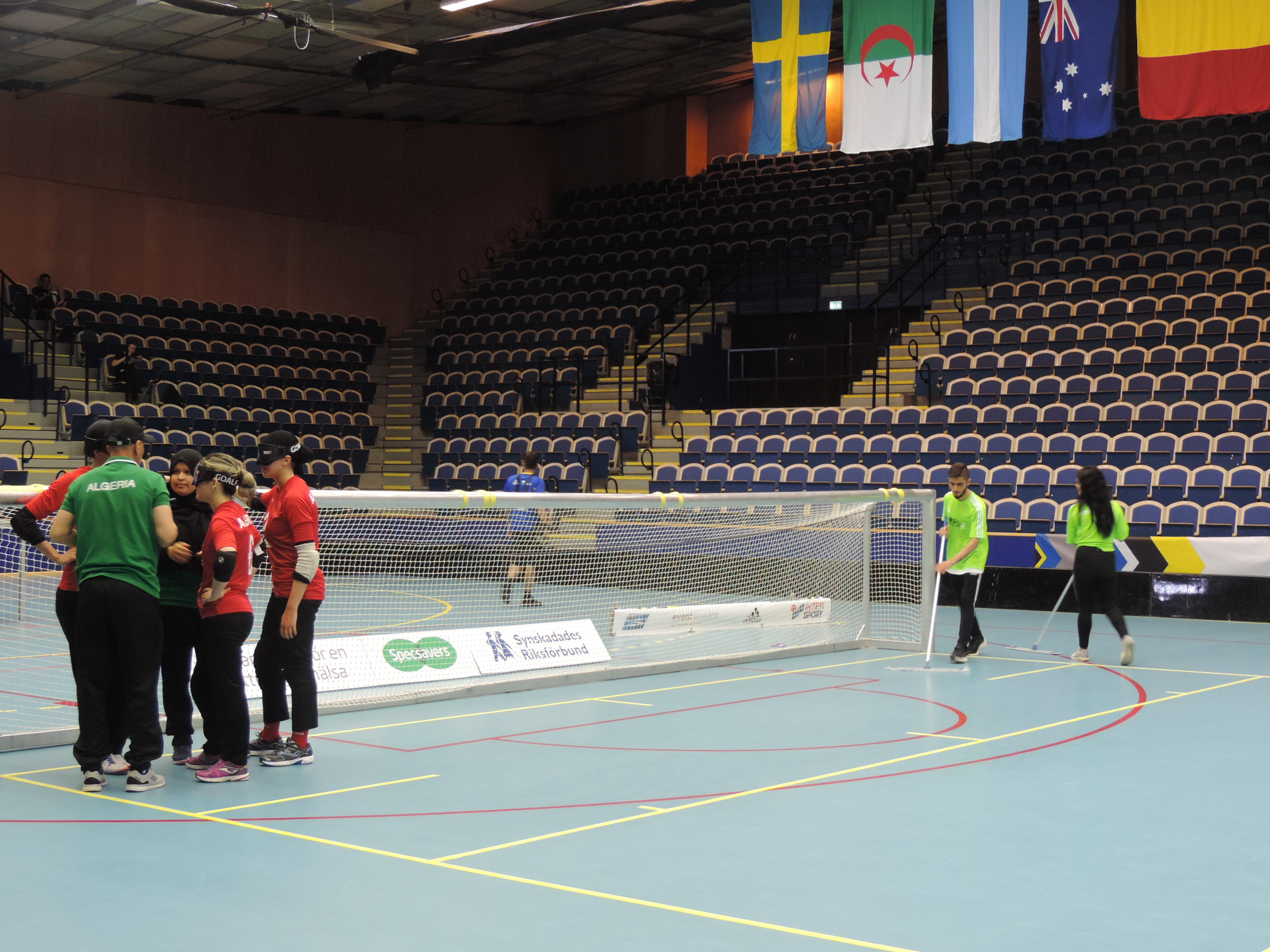
- Team time-out, World Goalball Championships, Malmö, Sweden (2018).
- Sport: Goalball
- League: IBSA
- Division: Women
- Region: IBSA Africa
- Location: Algeria
- Colours: Red
- Championships: Paralympic Games medals: : 0: 0: 0 World Championship medals: : 0: 0: 0

Algeria women's national goalball team is the women's national team of Algeria. Goalball is a team sport designed specifically for athletes with a vision impairment. The team takes part in international competitions.

== Paralympic Games ==
=== 2016 Rio de Janeiro ===
The team competed in the 2016 Summer Paralympics, with competition from Thursday 8 September to finals on Friday 16 September 2016, in the temporary Future Arena, Rio de Janeiro, Brazil.

The Algerian women's team did not show up in time for its matches against the United States or Israel. The team missed connecting flights in Rome after setting out from a training camp in Poland. There were suspicions of a boycott. The International Paralympic Committee's spokesman, Craig Spence, said: "They are still sticking to their story that they suffered the worst transport issues known to man. Whether we believe it is a question mark and we are looking into it." Their first two games were recorded as 10–0 walkover wins for the other team. The team of Algeria arrived in Rio on 11 September. Spence remarked: "Fingers crossed they can manage to travel from the (Athletes') Village to the goalball venue in less than six days."

The following is the Algeria roster in the women's goalball tournament of the 2016 Summer Paralympics.

No.	Player	Class	Date of birth (age)
1	Nawel Belhamiti	B1	1 June 1980 (aged 36)
2	Cherifa Bouchikhi	B2	18 January 1985 (aged 31)
4	Yamina Belarbi	B3	19 March 1990 (aged 26)
5	Bakhta Benallou	B3	5 May 1990 (aged 26)
6	Saida Bourouba	B3	1 August 1990 (aged 26)

Pos	Team	Pld	W	D	L	GF	GA	GD	Pts	Qualification
1	Brazil (H)	4	3	0	1	25	7	+18	9	Quarter-finals
2	United States	4	3	0	1	25	13	+12	9	Quarter-finals
3	Japan	4	2	1	1	13	8	+5	7	Quarter-finals
4	Israel	4	1	1	2	16	15	+1	4	Quarter-finals
5	Algeria	4	0	0	4	1	37	−36	0	

Source: Paralympic.org
(H) Hosts

9 September 2016; 14:30	Algeria	0–10 (walkover)	United States

10 September 2016; 18:45	Israel	10–0 (walkover)	Algeria

12 September 2016; 15:30	Japan	7–1	Algeria	Future Arena, Rio de Janeiro; Referees: Nejc Jakic (SLO), Rudi Janssen (BEL)
12 September 2016; 15:30	Temma 3 Kakehata 2 Adachi 2	Report	Benallou 1	Future Arena, Rio de Janeiro; Referees: Nejc Jakic (SLO), Rudi Janssen (BEL)

13 September 2016; 11:30	Algeria	0–10	Brazil	Future Arena, Rio de Janeiro; Referees: Patricia Fras (SLO), Dawna Christy (CAN)
13 September 2016; 11:30		Report	Amorim 6 Custodio 3 Rocha 1	Future Arena, Rio de Janeiro; Referees: Patricia Fras (SLO), Dawna Christy (CAN)

=== 2020 Tokyo ===
Algeria men's and women's team qualified for the Tokyo 2020 Paralympic Games, via 2020 IBSA African Championship held in Port Said, Egypt.

On Wednesday 21 April 2021 the International Blind Sports Federation received a 'notification of a late withdrawal of one of the women's teams from the Tokyo 2020 Paralympic Games'. Several days later the International Paralympic Committee announced the withdrawal of the women's team from Algeria, and that Egypt received the slot. No reason behind the team's withdrawal was indicated.

== World Championships ==
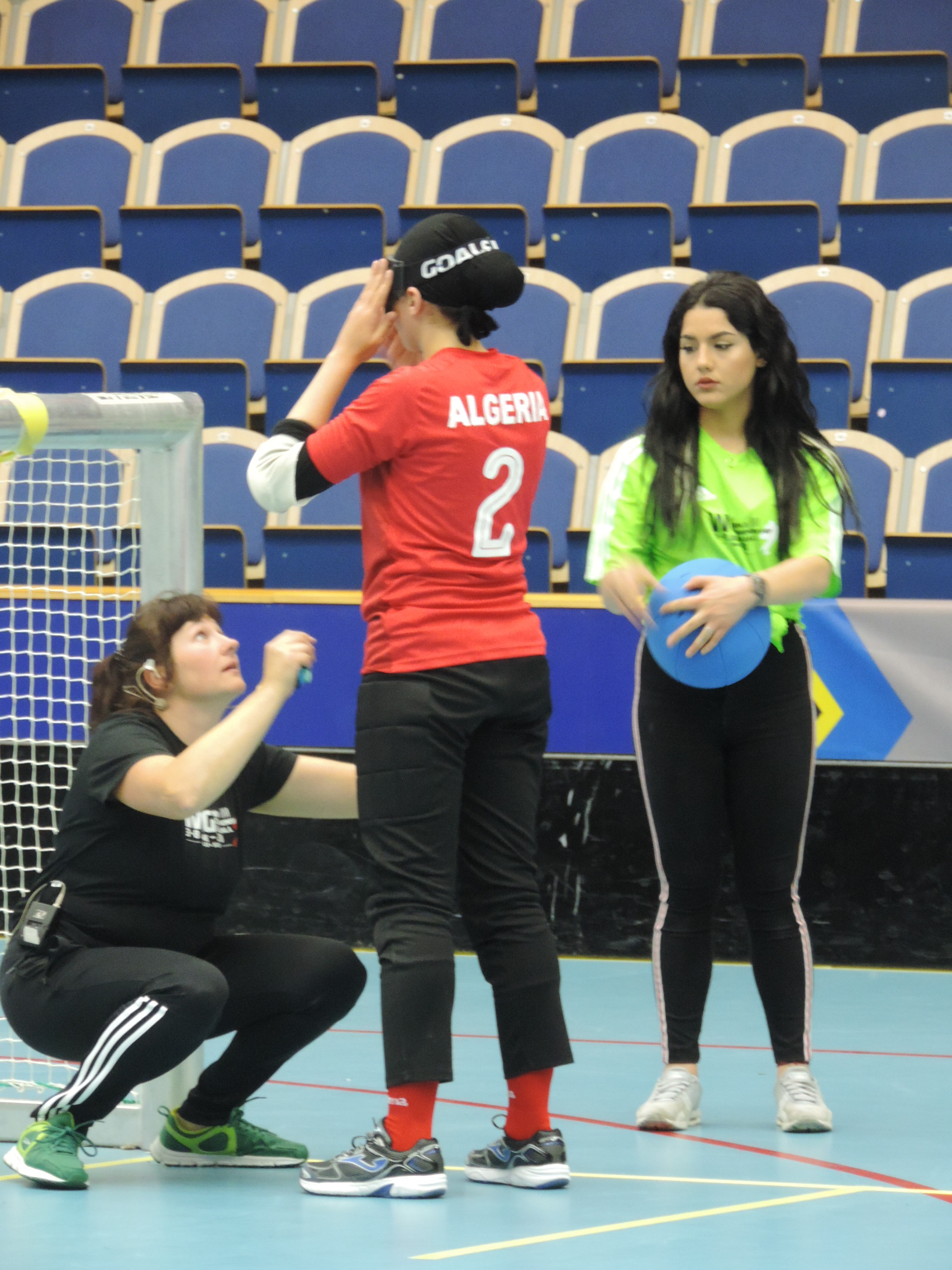
Eyeshade check of athlete #2, at the Goalball World Championships, Malmö, Sweden (2018).

=== 2018 Malmö ===
The team competed in the 2018 World Championships from 3 to 8 June 2018, at the Baltiska Hallen, Malmö, Sweden. They placed fifth in Pool D, lost in the quarter-finals to Russia 1:5, and placed seventh in final standings.

=== 2022 Matosinhos ===
The team were eligible to compete in the 2022 World Championships, by placing first in the 2021 regional championships.

The team competed in the 2022 World Championships from 7 to 16 December 2022, at the Centro de Desportos e Congressos de Matosinhos, Portugal. There were sixteen men's and sixteen women's teams. They placed fifth in Pool A, and tenth in final standings.

== IBSA World Games ==
=== 2003 Quebec City ===
The 2003 IBSA World Games were held in Quebec City, Canada with 10 teams competing. The first stage was pool play with 5 teams per pool and the top two teams in each pool advancing to the next round.

== Regional championships ==
The team competes in the IBSA Africa goalball region.

=== 2020 Port Said ===
The team competed between 2 and 5 March 2020 at the 2020 IBSA Goalball African Championships, at Port Said, Egypt, against Egypt and Morocco. This regional tournament would have been a regional championships if Ghana and Kenya women's teams had attended as originally indicated.

In the round robin, Algeria beat Morocco by mercy twice, Egypt by 9:2 and by mercy. In the semi-finals, Algeria beat Morocco 12:7, and mercied Egypt in the finals to take the gold medal.

=== 2021 Cape Coast ===
The team competed at the 2021 IBSA Goalball African Championships, from Monday 6 to Friday 10 December 2021, at the University of Cape Coast Sports Complex, Cape Coast, Ghana. This championships was a qualifier for the 2022 World Championships. Of the four women's teams (Algeria, Egypt, Ghana, Kenya), Algeria mercied Egypt to take the gold medal.

== Competitive history ==
The table below contains individual game results for the team in international matches and competitions.

Year	Event	Opponent	Date	Venue	Team	Team	Winner	Ref
2003	IBSA World Championships and Games	Ukraine	7 August	Quebec City, Canada	1	8	Ukraine	
2003	IBSA World Championships and Games	China	7 August	Quebec City, Canada	10	0	China	
2003	IBSA World Championships and Games	Spain	7 August	Quebec City, Canada	1	9	Spain	
2003	IBSA World Championships and Games	Brazil	7 August	Quebec City, Canada	0	10	Spain	

== See also ==
- Algeria men's national goalball team
- Algeria at the Paralympics
