= Spain women's national goalball team =

Spanish national team, for the Paralympic sport of goalball

Spain women's national goalball team is the women's national team of Spain. Goalball is a team sport designed specifically for athletes with a vision impairment. The team takes part in international competitions.

== Paralympic Games ==
The team competed at the 1992 Summer Paralympics in Barcelona, where they finished eighth. At the 1996 Summer Paralympics in Atlanta, Georgia, the team finished fourth. The team competed at the 2000 Summer Paralympics in Sydney, where they finished second.

== World Championships ==
IBSA World Goalball Championships have been held every four years from 1978.

The 1994 World Championships were held in Colorado Springs, Colorado. The team was one of nine teams participating, and they finished seventh overall. The 1998 World Championships were held in Madrid, Spain. The team was one of eleven teams participating, and they finished fifth overall. The 2002 World Championships were held in Rio de Janeiro, Brazil. The team was one of ten teams participating, and they finished sixth overall.

== IBSA World Games ==
The 2003 IBSA World Games were held in Quebec City, Canada with 10 teams competing. The first stage was pool play with 5 teams per pool and the top two teams in each pool advancing to the next round. The team made it out of the round robin round. Spain finished fourth overall.

The 2007 IBSA World Championships and Games were held in Brazil. The women's goalball competition included thirteen teams, including this one. The competition was a 2008 Summer Paralympics qualifying event.

== Regional championships ==
The team competes in the IBSA Europe goalball region.

The 2001 European Championships were held in Neerpelt, Belgium with six teams competing. The team finished fifth. In 2005, the European Championships were held in Neerpelt, Belgium. With ten teams competing, the team finished fifth.

The Turkish Blind Sports Federation hosted the 2007 IBSA Goalball European Championships in Antalya, Turkey with 11 teams contesting the women's competition. The team finished fourth.

Munich, Germany hosted the 2009 European Championships with eleven teams taking part. The team finished the event in ninth place.

Six teams took part in the 2010 IBSA European Championships Goalball Women B tournament held in Eskişehir, Turkey in July. The team finished third.

The team competed at the 2013 European Championships in Turkey, where they finished seventh.

== Competitive history ==
The table below contains individual game results for the team in international matches and competitions.

Year	Event	Opponent	Date	Venue	Team	Team	Winner	Ref
2003	IBSA World Championships and Games	Ukraine	7 August	Quebec City, Canada	3	3		
2003	IBSA World Championships and Games	China	7 August	Quebec City, Canada	4	1	Spain	
2003	IBSA World Championships and Games	Algeria	7 August	Quebec City, Canada	1	9	Spain	
2003	IBSA World Championships and Games	Brazil	7 August	Quebec City, Canada	1	2	Brazil	
2003	IBSA World Championships and Games	Finland	10 August	Quebec City, Canada	2	1	Finland	
2003	IBSA World Championships and Games	Japan	11 August	Quebec City, Canada	0	3	Japan	
2007	IBSA Goalball European Championships	Ukraine	25 April	OHEP Koleji Spor Salonu, Anyalya, Turkey	2	6	Spain	
2007	IBSA Goalball European Championships	Turkey	25 April	OHEP Koleji Spor Salonu, Anyalya, Turkey	2	5	Spain	
2007	IBSA Goalball European Championships	Germany	26 April	OHEP Koleji Spor Salonu, Anyalya, Turkey	1	3	Spain	
2007	IBSA Goalball European Championships	Great Britain	26 April	OHEP Koleji Spor Salonu, Anyalya, Turkey	3	0	Spain	
2007	IBSA Goalball European Championships	Netherlands	27 April	OHEP Koleji Spor Salonu, Anyalya, Turkey	3	4	Netherlands	
2007	IBSA Goalball European Championships	Denmark	27 April	OHEP Koleji Spor Salonu, Anyalya, Turkey	0	4	Denmark	
2007	IBSA Goalball European Championships	Ukraine	28 April	OHEP Koleji Spor Salonu, Anyalya, Turkey	1	3	Ukraine	
2007	IBSA World Championships and Games	Brazil	31 July	Brazil	5	8	Spain	
2007	IBSA World Championships and Games	Japan	1 August	Brazil	3	0	Japan	
2007	IBSA World Championships and Games	Australia	2 August	Brazil	5	1	Spain	
2007	IBSA World Championships and Games	South Korea	3 August	Brazil	0	10	Spain	
2007	IBSA World Championships and Games	Ukraine	4 August	Brazil	3	2	Ukraine	
2007	IBSA World Championships and Games	Germany	5 August	Brazil	3	0	Germany	
2009	IBSA Goalball European Championships	Great Britain	24 August	Munich, Germany	2	7	Great Britain	
2009	IBSA Goalball European Championships	Israel	25 August	Munich, Germany	1	6	Israel	
2009	IBSA Goalball European Championships	Turkey	25 August	Munich, Germany	3	5	Spain	
2009	IBSA Goalball European Championships	Spain	26 August	Munich, Germany	1	1		
2009	IBSA Goalball European Championships	Finland	27 August	Munich, Germany	7	1	Finland	
2009	IBSA Goalball European Championships	Ukraine	27 August	Munich, Germany	3	1	Spain	
2010	IBSA European Championships Goalball Women B	Hungary	8 July	Eskişehir, Turkey	2	5	Spain	
2013	IBSA Goalball European Championships	Germany	1–11 November	Konya, Turkey	2	3	Spain	
2013	IBSA Goalball European Championships	Israel	1–11 November	Konya, Turkey	3	4	Spain	
2013	IBSA Goalball European Championships	Denmark	1–11 November	Konya, Turkey	3	7	Spain	
2013	IBSA Goalball European Championships	Turkey	1–11 November	Konya, Turkey	2	8	Turkey	
2013	IBSA Goalball European Championships	Finland	7 November	Konya, Turkey	9	3	Finland	
2013	IBSA Goalball European Championships	Germany	8 November	Konya, Turkey	5	12	Germany	
2013	IBSA Goalball European Championships	Great Britain	8 November	Konya, Turkey	2	1	Spain	

== Goal scoring by competition ==
Player	Goals	Competition	Notes	Ref
Laura Belle	11	2007 IBSA World Championships and Games		
Laura Belle	9	2009 IBSA Goalball European Championships		
Eva Nuñez	6	2007 IBSA World Championships and Games		
Noelia Silva	5	2007 IBSA World Championships and Games		
María Carmen García	4	2009 IBSA Goalball European Championships		
Angeles Calderon	3	2007 IBSA World Championships and Games		
Ana Lancis	0	2009 IBSA Goalball European Championships		
Olga Polo	0	2009 IBSA Goalball European Championships		

== See also ==
- Disabled sports
- Spain at the Paralympics
