= Italy women's national goalball team =

Italian national team, for the Paralympic sport of goalball

- Sport: Goalball
- League: IBSA
- Division: Women
- Region: IBSA Europe
- Location: Italy
- Championships: Paralympic Games medals: : 0: 0: 0 World Championship medals: : 0: 0: 0

Italy women's national goalball team is the women's national team of Italy. Goalball is a team sport designed specifically for athletes with a vision impairment. The team takes part in international competitions.

== Paralympic Games ==
=== 1984 New York ===
The team competed in the 1984 Summer Paralympics at Long Island, New York City, United States of America, where they finished fifth.

== IBSA World Games ==
=== 2007 São Paulo ===
The team competed in the 2007 IBSA World Games, from 28 July 2007 to 8 August 2007, in São Paulo, Brazil. The women's goalball competition included thirteen teams, including this one. The competition was a 2008 Summer Paralympics qualifying event.

The team placed eighth.

== Regional championships ==
The team first participated in the B Division championships at Matosinhos, Portugal, in 2022.

== Goal scoring by competition ==
Player	Goals	Competition	Notes	Ref
Pisu Stefania	2	2007 IBSA World Championships and Games		
Albana Giuseppina	2	2007 IBSA World Championships and Games		
Barbara Aceranti	2	2007 IBSA World Championships and Games		
Antonieta Francello	1	2007 IBSA World Championships and Games		

== Competitive history ==
The table below contains individual game results for the team in international matches and competitions.

Year	Event	Opponent	Date	Venue	Team	Team	Winner	Ref
2007	IBSA World Championships and Games	Germany	1 August	Brazil	12	2	Germany	
2007	IBSA World Championships and Games	Great Britain	1 August	Brazil	6	2	Great Britain	
2007	IBSA World Championships and Games	Finland	2 August	Brazil	1	11	Finland	
2007	IBSA World Championships and Games	Greece	3 August	Brazil	2	12	Greece	
2007	IBSA World Championships and Games	Sweden	4 August	Brazil	0	10	Sweden	

== See also ==
- Disabled sports
- Italy men's national goalball team
- Italy at the Paralympics
