= Hungary men's national goalball team =

Hungary national team, for the Paralympic sport of goalball

Hungary men's national goalball team is the men's national team of Hungary. Goalball is a team sport designed specifically for athletes with a vision impairment. The team takes part in international competitions.

== Paralympic Games ==
=== 1984 New York ===
The team competed in the 1984 Summer Paralympics at Long Island, New York City, United States of America, where thirteen men's and five women's teams participated. The team finished eighth.

=== 1988 Seoul ===
The team competed in the 1988 Summer Paralympics, from 15 to 24 October 1988, in Seoul, South Korea. There were fourteen men's and eight women's teams. This was the first time the term "Paralympic" came into official use.

The team came fourth behind Egypt, USA, and Yugoslavia.

=== 1992 Barcelona ===
The team competed in the 1992 Summer Paralympics, from 3 to 14 September 1992, in the Pavelló de la Vall d'Hebron indoor stadium, Barcelona, Spain. There were twelve men's and eight women's teams.

The team came tenth.

=== 1996 Atlanta ===
The team competed in the 1996 Summer Paralympics, from 16 to 25 August 1996, in the GSU Sports Arena building, Atlanta, Georgia, United States of America. There were twelve men's and eight women's teams.

The team came eighth.

=== 2000 Sydney ===
The team competed in the 2000 Summer Paralympics, from 18 to 29 October 2000, at an Olympic Park indoor hall, Sydney, New South Wales, Australia. There were twelve men's and eight women's teams.

The team came seventh.

=== 2004 Athens ===
The team competed in 2004 Summer Paralympics, from 17 and 28 September 2004, in the Faliro Sports Pavilion Arena, Athens, Greece. There were twelve men's and eight women's teams.

The team came seventh.

== World Championships ==
IBSA World Goalball Championships have been held every four years from 1978. The men's team has represented Hungry in these championships. Placing first or second in the tournament may earn a berth in the Paralympic Games goalball tournaments.

The team has participated in the 1986, 1889, 2002, and 2010 World Championships.

== Regional championships ==
The team has participated in the IBSA goalball regional championships, including the inaugural championship in the 1983 in Greeve (Denmark), then 1985 Olsztyn, 1987 Milton Keynes, 1989 Vejle, 1991 Lahti, 1993 Loughborough, 1997 Stockholm, 1999 Walsall (coming second), and 2001 Budapest (coming first) championships. They then commenced in the new A Division for the 2005 Neerpelt championship.

== See also ==
- Hungary women's national goalball team
