= Yugoslavia men's national goalball team =

Former national sports team

Yugoslavia men's national goalball team (defunct)
- Sport: Goalball
- League: IBSA
- Division: Men
- Region: IBSA Europe
- Location: Yugoslavia (defunct)
- Championships: Paralympic Games medals: : 1: 0: 1 World Championship medals: : 1: 0: 1
- Parent group: Defunct

Yugoslavia men's national goalball team was the men's national team of Yugoslavia. Goalball is a team sport designed specifically for athletes with a vision impairment.

After the end of the Socialist Federal Republic of Yugoslavia in 1992, goalball is now played in the subsequent nations of Bosnia and Herzegovina, Croatia, Kosovo, Montenegro, Serbia, and Slovenia.

== Paralympic Games ==
=== 1980 Arnhem ===
The team competed in the 1980 Summer Paralympics in Arnhem, Netherlands. Twelve teams took part.

The team placed sixth.

=== 1984 New York ===
The team competed in the 1984 Summer Paralympics at Long Island, New York City, United States of America, where thirteen men's and five women's teams participated.

Yugoslavia finished third.

=== 1988 Seoul ===
The team competed in the 1988 Summer Paralympics, from 15 to 24 October 1988, in Seoul, South Korea. There were fourteen men's and eight women's teams. This was the first time the term "Paralympic" came into official use. Athletes were Muhamed Arnautovic, Miroslav Jancic, Adam Kablar, Rajko Kopac, and Dragan Sremcevic.

Yugoslavia won a gold medal.

== World Championships ==
IBSA World Goalball Championships have been held every four years from 1978.

=== 1982 Indianapolis ===
The team competed in the 1982 World Championships, from Monday 28 June to 1 July 1982, at the Hinkle Fieldhouse, Butler University in Indianapolis, Indiana, United States of America. Organised by United States Association of Blind Athletes, there were twelve men's and six women's teams. The coach was Teofilov Tomislav, with athletes including Ivo, Marinko, Miroslav, Ostoda, and Spiro.

The team came ninth, ahead of Israel, France, and Mexico.

=== 1986 Roermond ===
The 1986 IBSA World Goalball Championships were held in Roermond, the Netherlands. There were eighteen men's and ten women's teams.

The team took the gold medal.

=== 1990 Calgary ===
The team competed in the 1990 World Championships, in Calgary, Alberta, Canada. There were twelve men's and seven women's teams.

The team took the bronze medal.

== Regional championships ==
The team had competed in the IBSA Europe goalball region.

=== 1983 Greve ===
The team competed at the 1983 European Championships, in Greve, Denmark. There were twelve men's and five women's teams.

The team took the silver medal.

=== 1985 Olsztyn ===
The team competed at the 1985 European Championships, in Olsztyn, Poland. There were thirteen men's and six women's teams.

The team took the gold medal.

=== 1987 Milton Keynes ===
The team competed at the 1987 European Championships, in Milton Keynes, England. There were twelve men's and five women's teams.

The team took the gold medal.

=== 1989 Vejle ===
The team competed at the 1989 European Championships, in Vejle, Denmark. There were eleven men's and six women's teams.

The team took the gold medal, ahead of Germany.

== See also ==
- Disabled sports
