= Poland women's national goalball team =

Poland national team, for the Paralympic sport of goalball

Poland women's national goalball team is the women's national team of Poland. Goalball is a team sport designed specifically for athletes with a vision impairment. The team takes part in international competitions.

== Regional championships ==
The team competes in the IBSA Europe goalball region.

The 1985 European Championships were held in Olsztyn, Poland with six teams competing. The team finished fifth. Six teams took part in the 2010 IBSA European Championships Goalball Women B tournament held in Eskişehir, Turkey in July. The team finished sixth.

== Competitive history ==
The table below contains individual game results for the team in international matches and competitions.

Year	Event	Opponent	Date	Venue	Team	Team	Winner	Ref
2010	IBSA European Championships Goalball Women B	Turkey	8 July	Eskişehir, Turkey	3	13	Turkey	

== See also ==
- Disabled sports
- Poland at the Paralympics
