= Netherlands women's national goalball team =

Dutch national team, for the Paralympic sport of goalball

Netherlands women's national goalball team is the women's national team of the Netherlands. Goalball is a team sport designed specifically for athletes with a vision impairment. The team takes part in international competitions.

== Paralympic Games ==
The team competed at the 1984 Summer Paralympics, where they finished fourth. At the 1988 Summer Paralympics, the team finished fourth. The team competed at the 2000 Summer Paralympics in Sydney, where they finished seventh. At the 2004 Summer Paralympics in Athens, Greece, the team finished fifth.

== World Championships ==
IBSA World Goalball Championships have been held every four years from 1978. The women's team had represented the country in these championships. Placing first or second in the tournament may earn a berth in the Paralympic Games goalball tournaments.

The 1982 World Championships were held at Butler University in Indianapolis, Indiana. The team was one of six teams participating, and they finished fourth overall. The 1986 World Championships were held in Roermond, the Netherlands. The team was one of ten teams participating, and they finished third overall. The 1990 World Championships were held in Calgary, Alberta, Canada. The team was one of seven teams participating, and they finished fifth overall. The 1994 World Championships were held in Colorado Springs, Colorado. The team was one of nine teams participating, and they finished sixth overall. The 1998 World Championships were held in Madrid, Spain. The team was one of eleven teams participating, and they finished sixth overall. The 2002 World Championships were held in Rio de Janeiro, Brazil. The team was one of ten teams participating, and they finished third overall.

== Regional championships ==
The team competes in the IBSA Europe goalball region.

The 1985 European Championships were held in Olsztyn, Poland with six teams competing. The team finished fourth. The 2001 European Championships were held in Neerpelt, Belgium with eight teams competing. The team finished first. In 2005, the European Championships were held in Neerpelt, Belgium. With ten teams competing, the team finished fourth. The Turkish Blind Sports Federation hosted the 2007 IBSA Goalball European Championships in Anyalya, Turkey with 11 teams contesting the women's competition. The team finished seventh. Six teams took part in the 2010 IBSA European Championships Goalball Women B tournament held in Eskişehir, Turkey in July. The team finished fifth.

== Competitive history ==
The table below contains individual game results for the team in international matches and competitions.

Year	Event	Opponent	Date	Venue	Team	Team	Winner	Ref
2007	IBSA Goalball European Championships	Great Britain	25 April	OHEP Koleji Spor Salonu, Anyalya, Turkey	4	5	Netherlands	
2007	IBSA Goalball European Championships	Ukraine	25 April	OHEP Koleji Spor Salonu, Anyalya, Turkey	6	5	Ukraine	
2007	IBSA Goalball European Championships	Turkey	26 April	OHEP Koleji Spor Salonu, Anyalya, Turkey	2	10	Netherlands	
2007	IBSA Goalball European Championships	Germany	26 April	OHEP Koleji Spor Salonu, Anyalya, Turkey	2	5	Germany	
2007	IBSA Goalball European Championships	Spain	27 April	OHEP Koleji Spor Salonu, Anyalya, Turkey	3	4	Netherlands	
2007	IBSA Goalball European Championships	Greece	27 April	OHEP Koleji Spor Salonu, Anyalya, Turkey	2	1	Netherlands	
2010	IBSA European Championships Goalball Women B	Ukraine	8 July	Eskişehir, Turkey	8	0	Ukraine	

== See also ==
- Disabled sports
- Netherlands men's national goalball team
- Netherlands at the Paralympics
