= Hungary women's national goalball team =

Hungarian national team, for the Paralympic sport of goalball

Hungary women's national goalball team is the women's national team of Hungary. Goalball is a team sport designed specifically for athletes with a vision impairment. The team has taken part in international competitions.

== IBSA World Games ==
=== 2011 Antalya ===
The team competed in the 2011 IBSA World Games from 1 to 10 April 2011, in Antalya, Turkey, organised by the Turkish Blind Sports Federation. There were fifteen men's and fourteen women's teams. They placed sixth of seven teams in Group X, and were twelfth in the final standings.

== Regional championships ==
The team has competed in the IBSA Europe goalball region.

Six teams took part in the 2010 IBSA European Championships Goalball Women B tournament held in Eskişehir, Turkey in July. The team finished fourth.

== Competitive history ==
The table below contains individual game results for the team in international matches and competitions.

Year	Event	Opponent	Date	Venue	Team	Team	Winner	Ref
2010	IBSA European Championships Goalball Women B	Spain	8 July	Eskişehir, Turkey	2	5	Spain	

== See also ==
- Hungary men's national goalball team
