= Belgium men's national goalball team =

Belgian national team, for the Paralympic sport of goalball

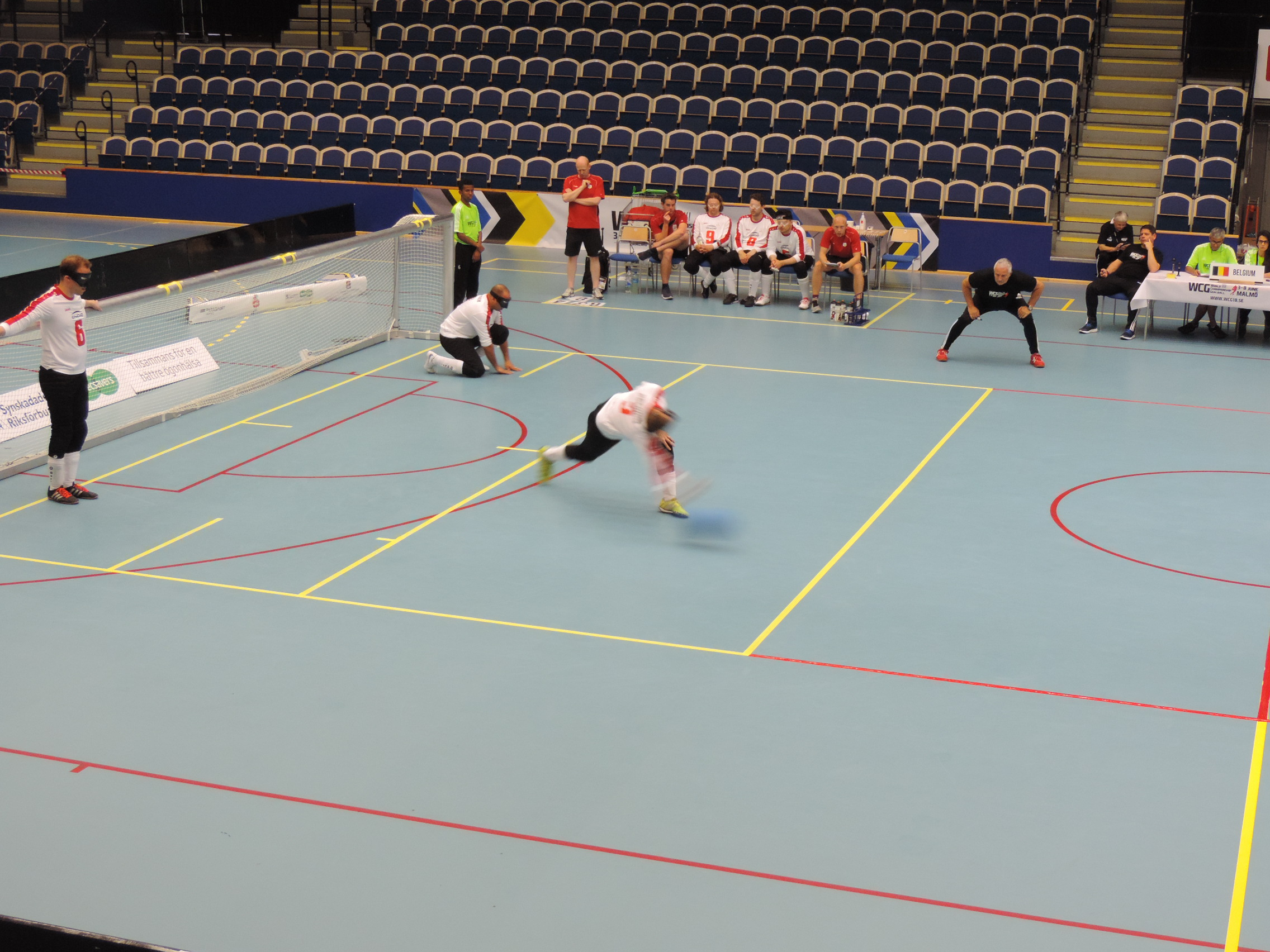
- Belgium men's team throwing at Australia, 2018 World Championships, Malmö, Sweden (2018).
- Nicknames: Belgian Bulls
- Sport: Goalball
- League: IBSA
- Division: Men
- Region: IBSA Europe
- Location: Belgium
- Colours: Red, white, black, yellow
- Championships: Paralympic Games medals: : 0: 0: 0 World Championship medals: : 0: 0: 1
- Parent group: Belgian Paralympic Committee
- Website: www.paralympic.be

Belgium men's national goalball team is the men's national team of Belgium. Goalball is a team sport designed specifically for athletes with a vision impairment. The national team takes part in international competitions.

The team is also known as the Belgian Bulls as it is a tradition in Belgium to have animal names for national teams.

== Paralympic Games ==
=== 1976 Toronto ===
The 1976 Summer Paralympics were held in Toronto, Canada. The team was one of seven teams participating, and they finished fourth overall.

=== 1980 Arnhem ===
At the 1980 Summer Paralympics in Arnhem, Netherlands, thirteen teams took part. The team finished fifth.

=== 2008 Beijing ===
The team came back to the international scene in the beginning of the 2000s and worked itself up to an international level. After coming back to the A-division in 2006, the team qualified in for the 2008 Summer Paralympics in Beijing, China, where they finished eleventh.

=== 2012 London ===
The team competed in the 2012 Summer Paralympics from 30 August to 7 September 2012, in London, England. In Group B, they finished the round-robin in third place behind China and Iran. The team was beaten by Brazil in the quarter-finals, 0:3, and finished in seventh overall place.

The following is the Belgium roster in the men's goalball tournament of the 2012 Summer Paralympics.

No.	Player	Age
2	Johan de Rick	41
3	Bruno Vanhove	29
4	Youssef Bihi	35
5	Klison Mapreni	20
6	Tom Vanhove	29
7	Glenn Van Thournout	29

Group B round-robin

30 August 2012; 16:15	Canada	2 – 4	Belgium	Copper Box, London; Referees: Thomas Baerz (GER) Shinji Mizuno (JPN)
30 August 2012; 16:15	Caron 2	Report	de Rick 2 Vanhove 1 Bihi 1	Copper Box, London; Referees: Thomas Baerz (GER) Shinji Mizuno (JPN)

31 August 2012; 21:00	Algeria	5 – 2	Belgium	Copper Box, London; Referees: Ali Aldarsony (KSA), Juha Vuokila (FIN)
31 August 2012; 21:00	Mokrane 3 Larbi 2	Report	de Rick 1 Bihi 1	Copper Box, London; Referees: Ali Aldarsony (KSA), Juha Vuokila (FIN)

1 September 2012; 18:30	Belgium	8 – 6	Iran	Copper Box, London; Referees: Morten Hammershoi (DEN), Juha Vuokila (FIN)
1 September 2012; 18:30	de Rick 3 Bihi 3 Vanhove 1 Mapreni 1	Report	Sayahi 3 Jafari 2 Shahbazi 1	Copper Box, London; Referees: Morten Hammershoi (DEN), Juha Vuokila (FIN)

2 September 2012; 15:00	Belgium	0 – 0	China	Copper Box, London; Referees: Hooshang Shariati (IRI), Warrick Jackes (AUS)
2 September 2012; 15:00		Report		Copper Box, London; Referees: Hooshang Shariati (IRI), Warrick Jackes (AUS)

3 September 2012; 09:00	South Korea	3 – 5	Belgium	Copper Box, London; Referees: Juha Vuokila (FIN), Morten Hammershoi (DEN)
3 September 2012; 09:00	Kim C.-H. 2 Hong 1	Report	B. Vanhove 2 Bihi 2 Mapreni 1	Copper Box, London; Referees: Juha Vuokila (FIN), Morten Hammershoi (DEN)

Semi-final

5 September 2012; 19:30	Brazil	3 – 0	Belgium	Copper Box, London; Referees: Tony Connolly (USA), Vilma Venckutonyte (LTU)
5 September 2012; 19:30	Marques 2 Almeida Maciel Celente 1	Report		Copper Box, London; Referees: Tony Connolly (USA), Vilma Venckutonyte (LTU)

The team tried to qualify for the Rio 2016 games but missed out during the 2014 World Championships and IBSA World Games.

=== 2020 Tokyo ===
The team competed in the 2020 Summer Paralympics, with competition from Wednesday 25 August to finals on Friday 3 September 2021, in the Makuhari Messe arena, Chiba, Tokyo, Japan. The team was selected for Tokyo 2020 following the 2018 World Championships in Malmö, Sweden.

The following is the Belgium roster in the men's goalball tournament of the 2020 Summer Paralympics.

No.	Player	Class	Date of birth (age)
1	Arne Vanhove	B2	17 August 1983 (aged 38)
2	Wassime Amnir	B1	1 February 1991 (aged 30)
3	Bruno Vanhove	B3	17 August 1983 (aged 38)
5	Klison Mapreni	B2	9 October 1992 (aged 28)
6	Tom Vanhove	B2	17 August 1983 (aged 38)
8	Rob Eijssen	B1	11 January 1991 (aged 30)

Pos	Team	Pld	W	D	L	GF	GA	GD	Pts	Qualification
1	Belgium	4	2	0	2	18	13	+5	6	Quarter-finals
2	Ukraine	4	2	0	2	18	15	+3	6	Quarter-finals
3	Turkey	4	2	0	2	15	15	0	6	Quarter-finals
4	China	4	2	0	2	21	22	−1	6	Quarter-finals
5	Germany	4	2	0	2	16	23	−7	6	

Source: TOCOG

Round-robin

26 August 2021; 09:00	Belgium	10−3	China	Makuhari Messe, Tokyo; Referees: Woradet Kultawongwattana (Thailand), Bas Spaans (Netherlands)
26 August 2021; 09:00	Mapreni 8 T. Vanhove 1 Amnir 1	Report	Yang Mingyuan 1 Hu Mingyao 1 Lai Liangyu 1	Makuhari Messe, Tokyo; Referees: Woradet Kultawongwattana (Thailand), Bas Spaans (Netherlands)

27 August 2021; 09:00	Turkey	4–6	Belgium	Makuhari Messe, Tokyo; Referees: Yoshinori Nii (Japan), Robert Avery (Great Britain)
27 August 2021; 09:00	Karakaya 3 Gündoğdu 1	Report	B. Vanhove 3 Mapreni 2 T. Vanhove 1	Makuhari Messe, Tokyo; Referees: Yoshinori Nii (Japan), Robert Avery (Great Britain)

28 August 2021; 19:00	Germany	2–0	Belgium	Makuhari Messe, Tokyo; Referees: Raquel Gomez Aguado (Spain), Vaida Pokvytytė (Lithuania)
28 August 2021; 19:00	Dennis 2	Report		Makuhari Messe, Tokyo; Referees: Raquel Gomez Aguado (Spain), Vaida Pokvytytė (Lithuania)

29 August 2021; 13:15	Belgium	2–4	Ukraine	Makuhari Messe, Tokyo; Referees: Yoshinori Nii (Japan), Robert Avery (Great Britain)
29 August 2021; 13:15	Mapreni 2	Report	Oliinyk 2 Zhyhalin 2	Makuhari Messe, Tokyo; Referees: Yoshinori Nii (Japan), Robert Avery (Great Britain)

== World Championships ==
=== 2018 Malmö ===
The team competed in the 2018 World Championships from 3 to 8 June 2018, in Malmö, Sweden. They confirmed their good level by winning the bronze at the Championships, and with this, they secured a ticket for the 2020 Tokyo Paralympic Games.

=== 2022 Matosinhos ===
The team competed in the 2022 World Championships from 7 to 16 December 2022, at the Centro de Desportos e Congressos de Matosinhos, Portugal. There were sixteen men's and sixteen women's teams. They placed fifth in Pool C, and tenth in final standings.

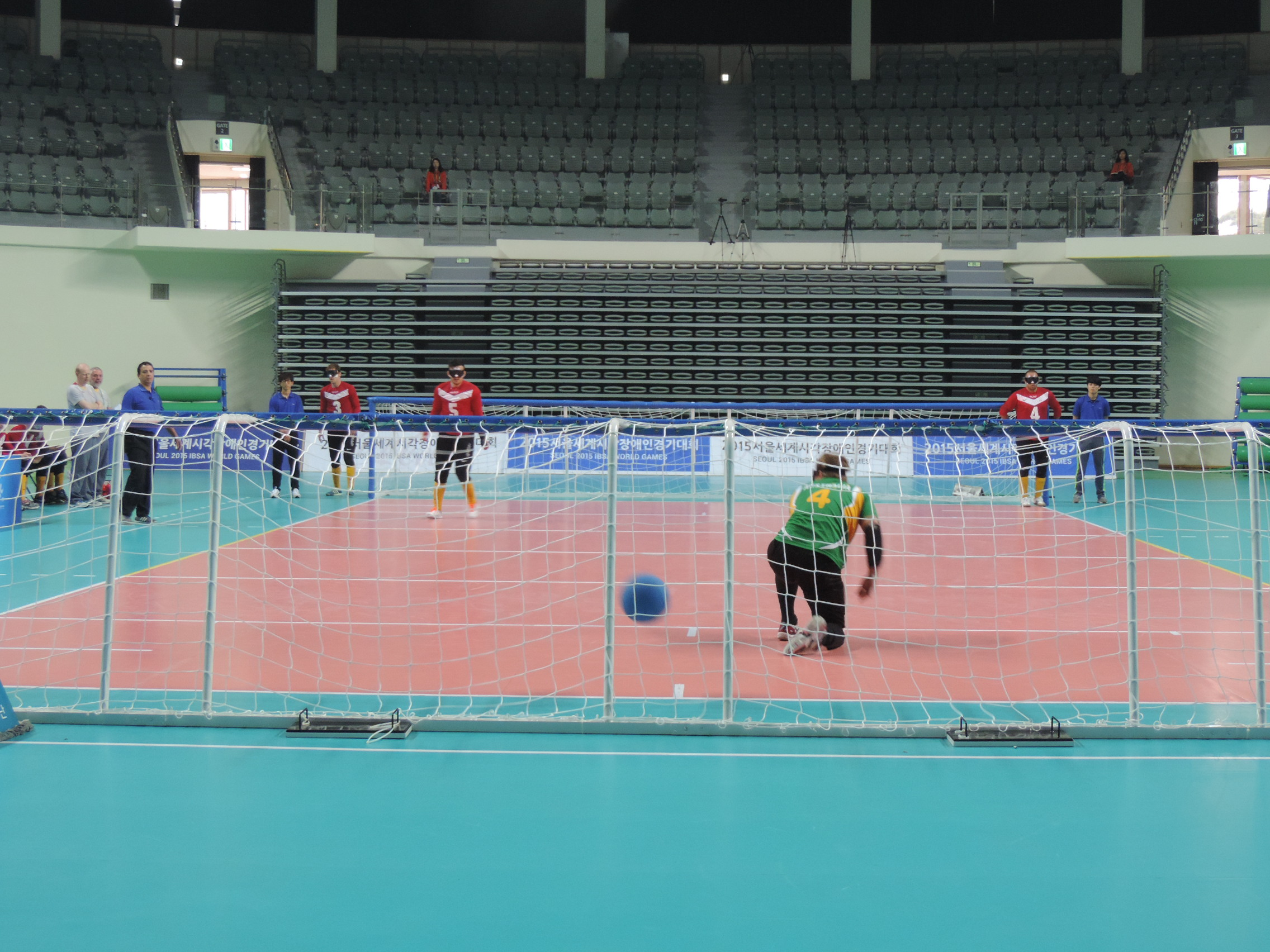
Australia in a penalty situation seeking to defend a Belgium throw, at the IBSA World Games, Seoul, South Korea (May 2015).

== IBSA World Games ==
=== 2015 Seoul ===
The team competed in the 2015 IBSA World Games from 10 to 17 May 2015, in Seoul, South Korea.

== Regional championships ==
The team competes in the IBSA Europe goalball region. Groups A and C are held one year, and Group B the following year. Strong teams move towards Group A.

=== 2013 Konya (Group A) ===
The team competed in the 2013 IBSA Goalball European Championships, Group A, from 1 to 11 November 2013, at Konya, Turkey. They beat Ukraine 5:3 to rank seventh in the overall standings.

=== 2015 Kaunas (Group A) ===
The team competed in the 2015 IBSA Goalball European A Championships in Kaunas, Lithuania. They lost their quarter-final match against Czech Republic, 4:10.

=== 2017 Pajulahti (Group A) ===
The team competed in the 2017 IBSA Goalball European A Championships from 15 to 23 September 2017, at Pajulahti, Nastola, Finland. The team took its first ever medal on an international level by winning the bronze at the Championships.

=== 2019 Rostock (Group A) ===
The team competed in the 2019 IBSA Goalball European A Championships from 5 to 14 October 2019, in Rostock, Germany. In Pool B, they came third, winning two games of their four; finishing sixth overall.

== See also ==
- Disabled sports
- Belgium women's national goalball team
- Belgium at the Paralympics
