= Germany men's national goalball team =

German national team, for the Paralympic sport of goalball

- Sport: Goalball
- League: IBSA
- Division: Men
- Region: IBSA Europe
- Location: Germany
- Colours: White, black
- Championships: Paralympic Games medals: :1:1:0; World Championship medals: :2:2:0

Germany men's national goalball team is the men's national team of Germany. Goalball is a team sport designed specifically for athletes with a vision impairment. It takes part in international competitions.

== Paralympic Games ==
=== 1976 Toronto ===
The 1976 Summer Paralympics were held in Toronto, Canada. The team was one of seven men's teams participating, and they finished second overall.

=== 1980 Arnhem ===
The team competed in the 1980 Summer Paralympics in Arnhem, Netherlands, where twelvemen's teams took part. The team finished first.

=== 1984 New York ===
The team competed in the 1984 Summer Paralympics at Long Island, New York City, United States of America, where thirteen men's and five women's teams participated. The team finished sixth.

=== 2020 Tokyo ===
The team competed in the 2020 Summer Paralympics, with competition from Wednesday 25 August to finals on Friday 3 September 2021, in the Makuhari Messe arena, Chiba, Tokyo, Japan.

The following is the Germany roster in the men's goalball tournament of the 2020 Summer Paralympics.

No.	Player	Class	Date of birth (age)
1	Michael Dennis	B2	13 October 1992 (aged 28)
2	Felix Rogge	B3	17 January 1989 (aged 32)
3	Thomas Steiger	B2	31 July 1996 (aged 25)
6	Oliver Hörauf	B2	13 November 1996 (aged 24)
7	Reno Tiede	B2	16 March 1990 (aged 31)
9	Fabian Diehm	B3	6 October 1997 (aged 23)

Pos	Team	Pld	W	D	L	GF	GA	GD	Pts	Qualification
1	Belgium	4	2	0	2	18	13	+5	6	Quarter-finals
2	Ukraine	4	2	0	2	18	15	+3	6	Quarter-finals
3	Turkey	4	2	0	2	15	15	0	6	Quarter-finals
4	China	4	2	0	2	21	22	−1	6	Quarter-finals
5	Germany	4	2	0	2	16	23	−7	6	

Source: TOCOG

Round-robin

25 August 2021; 17:30	Germany	6–4	Turkey	Makuhari Messe, Tokyo; Referees: Romualdas Vaitiekus (Lithuania), Reza Dehghan (Iran)
25 August 2021; 17:30	Dennis 4 Hörauf 1 Steiger 1	Report	Karakaya 3 Gündoğdu 1	Makuhari Messe, Tokyo; Referees: Romualdas Vaitiekus (Lithuania), Reza Dehghan (Iran)

26 August 2021; 17:30	Ukraine	11–5	Germany	Makuhari Messe, Tokyo; Referees: Yoshinori Nii (Japan), Vaida Pokvytytė (Lithuania)
26 August 2021; 17:30	Zhyhalin 7 Oliinyk 4	Report	Dennis 3 Rogge 2	Makuhari Messe, Tokyo; Referees: Yoshinori Nii (Japan), Vaida Pokvytytė (Lithuania)

28 August 2021; 19:00	Germany	2–0	Belgium	Makuhari Messe, Tokyo; Referees: Raquel Gomez Aguado (Spain), Vaida Pokvytytė (Lithuania)
28 August 2021; 19:00	Dennis 2	Report		Makuhari Messe, Tokyo; Referees: Raquel Gomez Aguado (Spain), Vaida Pokvytytė (Lithuania)

30 August 2021; 17:30	China	8–3	Germany	Makuhari Messe, Tokyo; Referees: Reza Dehghan (Iran), Romualdas Vaitiekus (Lithuania)
30 August 2021; 17:30	Yang Mingyuan 7 Hu Mingyao 1	Report	Dennis 2 Tiede 1	Makuhari Messe, Tokyo; Referees: Reza Dehghan (Iran), Romualdas Vaitiekus (Lithuania)

== World Championships ==
IBSA World Goalball Championships have been held every four years from 1978. Placing first or second in the tournament may earn a berth in the Paralympic Games goalball tournaments.

=== 2022 Matosinhos ===
The team competed in the 2022 World Championships from 7 to 16 December 2022, at the Centro de Desportos e Congressos de Matosinhos, Portugal. There were sixteen men's and sixteen women's teams. They placed fourth in Pool C, and seventh in final standings.

== Regional championships ==
The team competes in the IBSA Europe goalball region. Groups A and C are held one year, and Group B the following year. Strong teams move towards Group A.

The team has participated in the IBSA goalball regional championships, including the inaugural 1983 Greeve (Denmark) championships.

== See also ==
- Disabled sports
- Germany women's national goalball team
- Germany at the Paralympics
