= Great Britain men's national goalball team =

British national team, for the Paralympic sport of goalball

The Great Britain men's national goalball team is the men's national team of Great Britain. Goalball is a team sport designed specifically for athletes with a vision impairment. The team takes part in international competitions.

== Paralympic Games ==
At the 1980 Summer Paralympics in Arnhem, Netherlands, thirteen teams took part. The team finished 13th.

== Regional championships ==
The team has participated in the IBSA goalball regional championships, including the first championship in the 1983 in Greeve (Denmark), then 1985 Olsztyn, 1987 Milton Keynes, 1989 Vejle, 1991 Lahti, 1993 Loughborough, and 1999 Walsall championships. They then commenced in the new A Division for the 2005 Neerpelt championship.

== See also ==
- Great Britain women's national goalball team
