= Netherlands men's national goalball team =

Netherlands national team, for the Paralympic sport of goalball

Netherlands men's national goalball team is the Netherlands men's national team. Goalball is a team sport designed specifically for athletes with a vision impairment. The team takes part in international competitions.

== Paralympic Games ==
At the 1980 Summer Paralympics in Arnhem, Netherlands, twelve teams took part. The team finished third. New York hosted the 1984 Summer Paralympics where thirteen teams participated and the team finished ninth.

== World Championships ==
IBSA World Goalball Championships have been held every four years from 1978. The men's team had represented the country in these championships in 1982, 1986, 1990, and 1994.

== Regional championships ==
The team has competed in the IBSA Europe goalball region. Groups A and C are held one year, and Group B the following year. Strong teams move towards Group A.

The team has participated in the IBSA goalball regional championships, including coming third in the inaugural 1983 Greeve (Denmark) championships, and attending the 1985 Olsztyn, 1987 Milton Keynes (coming second), 1989 Vejle, 1991 Lahti, and 1993 Loughborough championships. The team came third in the C Division 2007 Antalya championships, and second in the C Division 2009 Albufeira championships, attended the B Division 2010 Assens championship, before continuing in the C Division with the 2011 Bialystok championships.

== See also ==
- Netherlands women's national goalball team
