= Israel men's national goalball team =

Israeli national team, for the Paralympic sport of goalball

The Israel men's national goalball team is the men's national team of Israel. Goalball is a team sport designed specifically for athletes with a vision impairment. The team has taken part in international goalball competitions.

== Paralympic Games ==
=== 1976 Toronto ===
The 1976 Summer Paralympics were held in Toronto, Canada. The team was one of seven men's teams participating, and they finished fifth overall.

=== 1980 Arnhem ===
The team competed in the 1980 Summer Paralympics in Arnhem, Netherlands, where twelve men's teams took part. The team finished eighth. Members of the national team were Moshe Weiss, Uri Cohen, Moti Levy, Rafael Falach, Reuven Perach and Zohar Sharon.

=== 1984 New York ===
The team competed in the 1984 Summer Paralympics at Long Island, New York City, United States of America, where thirteen men's and five women's teams participated. The team finished seventh.

=== 1988 Seoul ===
The team finished fifth overall.

=== 1992 Barcelona ===
The team took part in the preliminary matches.

== World Championships ==
IBSA World Goalball Championships have been held every four years from 1978. The men's team had regularly represented the country in these championships, namely 1978, 1982, 1986, 1990, and 1994.

== IBSA World Games ==
=== 2003 Quebec City ===
The team competed in the 2003 IBSA World Games from Friday 1 to Sunday 10 August 2011, in Quebec City, Canada. Ten teams competed.

== Regional championships ==
The team competes in the IBSA Europe goalball region. Groups A and C are held one year, and Group B the following year. Strong teams move towards Group A.
