= Denmark men's national goalball team =

Danish national team, for the Paralympic sport of goalball

Denmark men's national goalball team is the men's national team of Denmark. Goalball is a team sport designed specifically for athletes with a vision impairment. The team takes part in international competitions.

== Paralympic Games ==
The 1976 Summer Paralympics were held in Toronto, Canada. The team was one of seven teams participating, and they finished third overall. At the 1980 Summer Paralympics in Arnhem, Netherlands, twelve teams took part. The team finished tenth. New York hosted the 1984 Summer Paralympics where thirteen teams participated and the team finished twelfth.

== Regional championships ==
The team has participated in the IBSA goalball regional championships, including the first championships at 1983 Greeve (Denmark) championships, 1985 Olsztyn, 1987 Milton Keynes, 1989 Vejle, 1991 Lahti, 1993 Loughborough, 1997 Stockholm, 1999 Walsall, and 2001 Budapest championships. They also commenced in the new A Division in 2005.

== See also ==
- Denmark women's national goalball team
