= Provinciaal Domein Dommelhof =

Provincial Domain Dommelhof is an institution of the province Limburg (Belgium) in Belgium for culture, performing arts, and sports. Dommelhof was opened in 1967 in the municipality Neerpelt. The institution was the first cultural center in Flanders.

== History ==
In 1962, the Provincial Council of Belgian Limburg decided to set up Dommelhof. Second Minister of Culture Frans Van Mechelen decided to subsidize the construction of the cultural infrastructure. This infrastructure, designed by Alfons Hoppenbrouwers, included a theater, education and residence building. In 1967 the first show of the theater was a fact. Until the 1980s, content was mainly devoted to social-cultural education and experimental programming in the theater. In 1979 the site was expanded with a sports center. In the 1980s an international doll festival was launched and a summer festival for open air theater was launched. The puppet festival has disappeared and the festival for open air theater expanded in the following years to the international festival for outdoor, venue and circus theater on the Market. The platform for arthousecinema in Limburg, Zebracinema, also originated in Dommelhof.

The Klankenbos (Sound forest) of Provinciaal Domein Dommelhof is the biggest sound art collection in a public space in Europe. In the forest there are 15 sound installation pieces by artists such as Pierre Berthet, Paul Panhuysen, Geert Jan Hobbijn (Staalplaat Soundsystem), Hans van Koolwijk, and others.

== Operation ==
The current activities of Dommelhof include:

- Theater op de Markt: Distribution and creation of circus and open-air theater through a summer festival and autumn festival, and a production cell for (inter)national creation assignments and residences
- TAKT: support talent in performing arts
- Sports center: facilitating regional sports activities
- Residence building: facilitating multi-day training for the socio-cultural field

== Partners ==
Dommelhof works structurally with regional and Flemish cultural partners:

- Musica: Impulse Center for music, and manager of het Klankenbos (the sound forest) on the Dommelhof site
- Zebracinema: arthouse cinema in Belgian Limburg
- Circus Center: Flemish anchor point for circus art
- Jazzcase: Northern limburg jazz platform
