= Belgium women's national goalball team =

Belgian national team, for the Paralympic sport of goalball

Belgium women's national goalball team is the women's national team of Belgium. Goalball is a team sport designed specifically for athletes with a vision impairment. The team takes part in international competitions.

== World Championships ==
IBSA World Goalball Championships have been held every four years from 1978.

The 1986 World Championships were held in Roermond, the Netherlands. The team was one of ten teams participating, and they finished ninth overall.

== Regional championships ==
The team has participated in the IBSA goalball regional championships, including the inaugural 1983 Greeve (Denmark) championships, 1991 Lahti, 1993 Loughborough, and 2001 Neerpelt championships. They also participated in the B Division at 2014 Budapest, 2016 Porto, and 2018 Chorzów championships.

== See also ==
- Disabled sports
- Belgium men's national goalball team
- Belgium at the Paralympics
