= Finland men's national goalball team =

Finnish national team, for the Paralympic sport of goalball

Finland men's national goalball team is the men's national team of Finland. Goalball is a team sport designed specifically for athletes with a vision impairment. The team takes part in international competitions.

== Paralympic Games ==
At the 1980 Summer Paralympics in Arnhem, Netherlands, twelve teams took part. The team finished seventh. New York hosted the 1984 Summer Paralympics where thirteen teams participated and the team finished tenth.

== Regional championships ==
The team competes in the IBSA Europe goalball region. Groups A and C are held one year, and Group B the following year. Strong teams move towards Group A.

== See also ==
- Finland women's national goalball team
