= Pavelló de la Vall d'Hebron =

Sports venue in Barcelona, Spain

Centre Esportiu Municipal Olímpics Vall d'Hebron
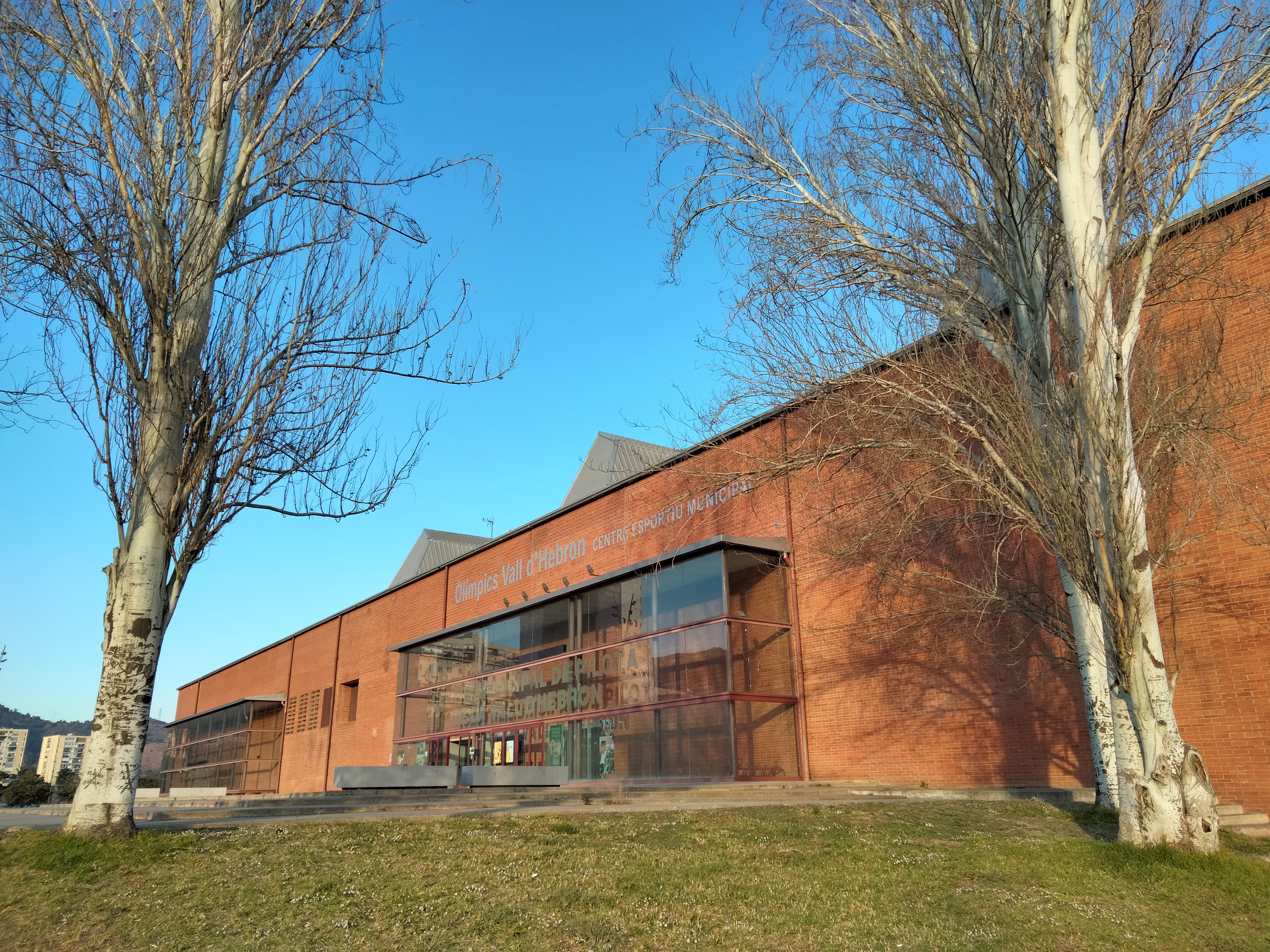
- Interactive map of Centre Esportiu Municipal Olímpics Vall d'Hebron
- Coordinates: 41.4279°N 2.1451°E

Construction
- Opened: 1992
- Architects: Jordi Garcés, Enric Sòria

Tenant
- Club Voleibol Vall d'Hebron

The Pavelló de la Vall d'Hebron (English: Vall d'Hebron Pavilion) is an indoor venue located in Barcelona, Catalonia, Spain. The building was completed in 1991 for the Games.

For the 1992 Summer Olympics, it hosted the basque pelota demonstration and the volleyball preliminaries.

For the 1992 Summer Paralympics, it hosted goalball, a team sport designed specifically for athletes with a vision impairment.
