= IBSA World Games =

International multi-sport event

- Purpose: Sports for blind people
- Frequency: Every 4 years
- Inaugurated: July 1998; 28 years ago in Madrid, Spain
- Most recent: 2023 IBSA World Games in Birmingham, UK
- Next event: 2027 in Tashkent, Uzbekistan
- President: Ilgar Rahimov
- Headquarters: Bonn, Germany
- Website: IBSA Sport

The IBSA World Games (formerly IBSA World Championships and Games) or World Blind Games are an international multi-sport event, occurring every four years, organised by the International Blind Sports Federation (IBSA). The events enable blind and partially sighted athletes to compete in a number of sports. The first event took place at Madrid, Spain in 1998.

== Editions ==
=== IBSA World Games ===
Edition	Year	Host	Dates	Sports
1	1998	Spain, Madrid	18–26 July	4
2	2003	Canada, Quebec	5–10 August	5
3	2007	Brazil, São Paulo	28 July – 8 August	6
4	2011	Turkey, Antalya	1–10 April	7
5	2015	South Korea, Seoul	8–18 May	10
6	2019	Not held	-	-
7	2023	United Kingdom, Birmingham	18–27 August	11
8	2027	Uzbekistan, Tashkent		

=== IBSA World Youth Games (WYC) ===
- Former name: IBSA World Youth and Student Games

Edition	Year	Host	Dates	Sports
1	2005	USA, Colorado Springs	4–10 August	5
2	2007	USA, Colorado Springs	11–17 July	5
3	2009	USA, Colorado Springs	15–20 July	3
4	2011	USA, Colorado Springs	13–18 July	3
5	2013	USA, Colorado Springs	13–15 September	2
6	2015	USA, Colorado Springs	26–30 July	1
7	2017	HUN, Budaörs	1–9 July	1

- 2013 also IBSA Para Pan-American Games.
- 2009 and 2011 in judo and goalball and Athletics and 2013 in judo and goalball, 2015 and 2017 only in goalball.

== History ==
=== 1998 Madrid ===
The inaugural 1998 sports event was held in Madrid, Spain for athletics, swimming, goalball and judo for the blind and vision-impaired.

=== 2003 Quebec ===
The 2003 Quebec, Canada event included five-a-side football, goalball and judo, other disciplines have been added to the event. Blind athletes were able to compete in the following sports: powerlifting, ten-pin and nine-pin bowling, biathlon, alpine skiing, archery, showdown, swimming, shooting, torball, Nordic skiing, athletics and cycling. Although a lot of winter sports were added to the list such as skiing, but also bowling and many others, but was held in five sports: Swimming, athletics, goalball, judo, and powerlifting.

=== 2007 São Paulo ===
The 2007 IBSA World Games was held from 28 July to 8 August in São Paulo, Brazil.

The sports were powerlifting, judo, goalball, football, swimming, and athletics.

=== 2011 Antalya ===
The 2011 Antalya, Turkey sports were athletics, chess, futsal (football) B1, futsal (football) B2/B3, goalball, judo, powerlifting, swimming.

=== 2015 Seoul ===
The 2015 IBSA World Games was held from 8 to 18 June 2015, in Seoul, South Korea.

=== 2019 events ===
Nominations for the host nation for the 2019 IBSA World Games was called on 3 March 2017. It was not possible to find a host nation able to cater for all the sports. Instead the IBSA Goalball and Judo Paralympic Games qualifying tournaments were held in Fort Wayne, Indiana, United States of America in June–July 2019, in conjunction with the federation's four-yearly international general assembly.

=== 2023 Birmingham ===
In May 2020, British Blind Sport and the University of Birmingham, England was announced as the host city, for 18–27 August 2023. There were ten sports, including goalball which was held in Coventry.

=== 2027 Tashkent ===
The host nation was announced in November 2024 for Tashkent, under the auspices of the Uzbekistan National Paralympic Committee, to be conducted from Wednesday 26 May 2027 to Sunday 6 June 2027, at the newly-developed Olympic and Paralympic Park. (The venues will then be used for the World Para Athletics Championships from Wednesday 19 June 2026.)

== See also ==
- Blind football at the IBSA World Games
