= Turkish Blind Sports Federation =

Blindness organization based in Turkey

- Abbreviation: GESF
- Formation: July 12, 2000; 25 years ago
- Type: Sports federation
- Headquarters: Ulus, Ankara, Turkey
- Coordinates: 39°56′30.85″N 32°51′15.60″E
- President: Abdullah Çetin
- Affiliations: International Blind Sports Federation (IBSA); International Paralympic Committee (IPC)
- Website: www.gesf.org.tr

The Turkish Blind Sports Federation (Turkish: Türkiye Görme Engelliler Spor Federasyonu, GESF) is the governing body to encourage and develop the sport for the blind and vision-impaired in Turkey. It is a member of the International Blind Sports Association (IBSA) and the International Paralympic Committee (IPC).

In 1990, the Turkish Disabled Sports Federation was formed, and the Blind Sport Federation was created as part of this organization in Ankara. On March 7, 2000, the Blind Sport Federation separated as an independent organization. In accordance with the developments on blind sport in Europe, the Federation was officially established on July 12, 2000.

Sports promoted by the federation are:

- athletics,
- chess,
- futsal B1 and B2/B3,
- goalball women's and men's leagues,
- judo,
- cycling,
- powerlifting as well as
- swimming women's and men's short and long course.

== International events hosted by Turkey ==
The federation organized the 4th IBSA World Championships and Games in Antalya on April 1–10, 2011.

== Notable sportspeople ==
- Nazan Akın (born 1983), 2012 Summer Paralympics silver medalist in judoka
- Duygu Çete (born 1989), 2012 Summer Paralympics bronze medalist in judoka

== See also ==
- Turkey men's national goalball team
