= Goalball at the 2016 Summer Paralympics – Women's team rosters =

This article shows the rosters of all participating teams at the women's goalball tournament at the 2016 Summer Paralympics in Rio de Janeiro.

== Group C ==
=== Algeria ===
The following is the Algeria roster in the women's goalball tournament of the 2016 Summer Paralympics.

No.	Player	Class	Date of birth (age)
1	Nawel Belhamiti	B1	1 June 1980 (aged 36)
2	Cherifa Bouchikhi	B2	18 January 1985 (aged 31)
4	Yamina Belarbi	B3	19 March 1990 (aged 26)
5	Bakhta Benallou	B3	5 May 1990 (aged 26)
6	Saida Bourouba	B3	1 August 1990 (aged 26)

=== Brazil ===
The following is the Brazil roster in the women's goalball tournament of the 2016 Summer Paralympics.

No.	Player	Class	Date of birth (age)
1	Simone Rocha	B1	3 August 1976 (aged 40)
2	Neusimar Santos	B2	21 May 1981 (aged 35)
3	Ana Carolina Custodio	B2	23 April 1987 (aged 29)
5	Cláudia Oliveira	B1	29 June 1976 (aged 40)
7	Gleyse Portioli	B2	29 July 1983 (aged 33)
9	Victoria Amorim	B1	29 November 1997 (aged 18)

=== Israel ===
The following is the Israel roster in the women's goalball tournament of the 2016 Summer Paralympics.

No.	Player	Class	Date of birth (age)
1	Elham Mahamid	B3	16 February 1990 (aged 26)
2	Yarden Adika	B3	14 July 1999 (aged 17)
3	Gal Hamrani	B1	1 December 1992 (aged 23)
5	Roni Ohayon	B2	8 March 1999 (aged 17)
6	Lihi Ben-David	B1	8 December 1995 (aged 20)
9	Sivan Abravaya	B2	13 August 1990 (aged 26)

=== Japan ===
The following is the Japan roster in the women's goalball tournament of the 2016 Summer Paralympics.

No.	Player	Class	Date of birth (age)
1	Haruka Wakasugi	B1	23 August 1995 (aged 21)
2	Eiko Kakehata	B3	19 February 1993 (aged 23)
5	Rie Urata	B1	1 July 1977 (aged 39)
6	Akiko Adachi	B2	10 September 1983 (aged 32)
7	Yuki Temma	B1	26 July 1990 (aged 26)
9	Masae Komiya	B1	8 May 1975 (aged 41)

=== United States ===
The following is the United States roster in the women's goalball tournament of the 2016 Summer Paralympics.

No.	Player	Class	Date of birth (age)
1	Jen Armbruster	B1	February 12, 1975 (aged 41)
3	Lisa Czechowski	B2	May 29, 1979 (aged 37)
4	Asya Miller	B3	October 16, 1979 (aged 36)
5	Amanda Dennis	B2	February 5, 1994 (aged 22)
7	Eliana Mason	B2	September 1, 1995 (aged 21)
9	Marybai Huking	B2	November 11, 1996 (aged 19)

== Group D ==
=== Australia ===
The following is the Australia roster in the women's goalball tournament of the 2016 Summer Paralympics.

No.	Player	Class	Date of birth (age)
1	Jennifer Blow	B3	10 April 1991 (aged 25)
2	Tyan Taylor	B3	23 March 1990 (aged 26)
3	Nicole Esdaile	B3	1 June 1987 (aged 29)
6	Michelle Rzepecki	B3	6 November 1986 (aged 29)
7	Raissa Martin	B3	3 March 1991 (aged 25)
8	Meica Horsburgh	B3	24 February 1989 (aged 27)

=== Canada ===
The following is the Canada roster in the women's goalball tournament of the 2016 Summer Paralympics.

No.	Player	Class	Date of birth (age)
3	Whitney Bogart	B3	April 21, 1986 (aged 30)
4	Ashlie Marie Andrews	B3	January 4, 1993 (aged 23)
6	Jillian Macsween	B3	June 2, 1992 (aged 24)
7	Amy Burk	B3	March 17, 1990 (aged 26)
8	Meghan Mahon	B2	January 15, 1996 (aged 20)
9	Nancy Morin	B2	August 28, 1975 (aged 41)

=== China ===
The following is the China roster in the women's goalball tournament of the 2016 Summer Paralympics.

No.	Player	Class	Date of birth (age)
1	Chen Fengqing	B1	17 July 1985 (aged 31)
2	Ju Zhen	B2	10 May 1989 (aged 27)
3	Zhang Wei	B1	22 December 1989 (aged 26)
4	Zhao Kaimei	B2	10 November 1987 (aged 28)
5	Zhang Huiwen	B1	12 June 1993 (aged 23)
6	Sun Le	B1	17 August 1993 (aged 23)

=== Turkey ===
The following is the Turkey roster in the women's goalball tournament of the 2016 Summer Paralympics.

No.	Player	Class	Date of birth (age)
1	Neşe Mercan	B2	19 September 1994 (aged 21)
2	Seda Yıldız	B3	7 December 1998 (aged 17)
3	Sevda Altunoluk	B2	1 April 1994 (aged 22)
4	Gülşah Düzgün	B2	25 September 1995 (aged 20)
6	Buket Atalay	B2	14 August 1990 (aged 26)
7	Sümeyye Özcan	B1	15 January 1992 (aged 24)

=== Ukraine ===
The following is the Ukraine roster in the women's goalball tournament of the 2016 Summer Paralympics.

No.	Player	Class	Date of birth (age)
1	Olena Rud	B2	2 June 1984 (aged 32)
2	Liliia Pasko	B2	1 March 1994 (aged 22)
3	Yuliia Maksymenko	B2	18 June 1994 (aged 22)
4	Maryna Gabeda	B2	3 September 1992 (aged 24)
5	Tetiana Govorukha	B2	26 December 1984 (aged 31)
7	Nataliia Miroshnyk	B2	8 October 1987 (aged 28)

== See also ==
- Goalball at the 2016 Summer Paralympics – Men's team rosters
