= Brazil women's national goalball team =

Brazilian national team, for the Paralympic sport of goalball

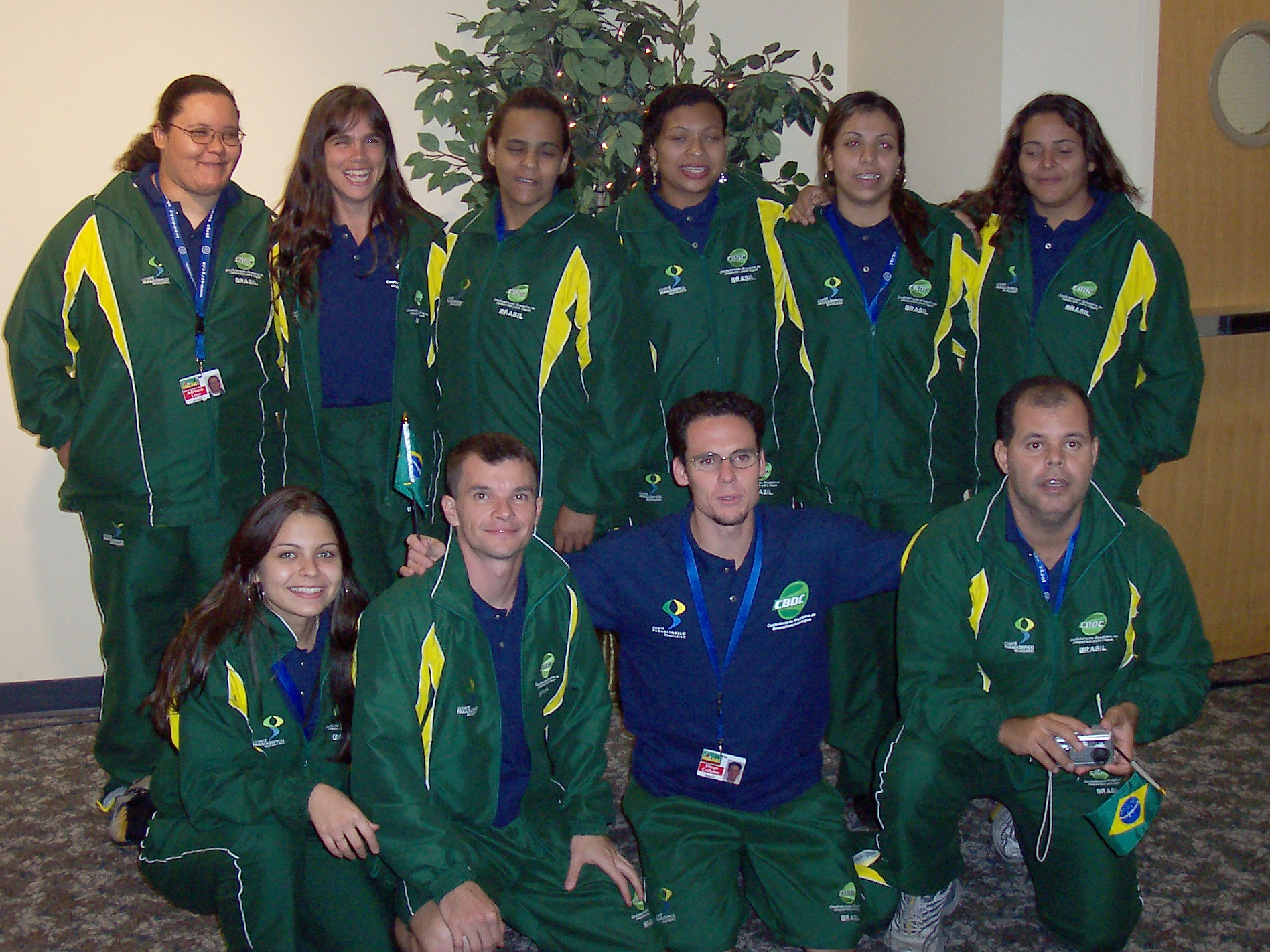
- Brazil women's goalball team. Goalball World Championships, Spartanburg, South Carolina, USA (July 2006).
- Sport: Goalball
- League: IBSA
- Division: Women
- Region: IBSA America
- Location: Brazil
- Colours: Gold, Green
- Championships: Paralympic Games medals: : 0: 0: 0 World Championship medals: : 0: 0: 1
- Parent group: Brazilian Paralympic Committee

Brazil women's national goalball team is the women's national team of Brazil. Goalball is a team sport designed specifically for athletes with a vision impairment. The team takes part in international goalball competitions.

== Paralympic Games ==
=== 2004 Athens ===
The team competed in 2004 Summer Paralympics, between 17 and 28 September 2004, in the Faliro Sports Pavilion Arena, Athens, Greece. The team finished seventh.

=== 2008 Beijing ===
The team competed in 2008 Summer Paralympics, from 6 to 17 September 2008, in the Beijing Institute of Technology Gymnasium 'bat wing' arena, Beijing, China. They did not reach the quarter-finals of the eight teams.

=== 2012 London ===
The team competed in the 2012 Summer Paralympics from 30 August to 7 September 2012, in the Copper Box Arena, London, England. In Group A, they were beaten by Japan 0:2 in the quarter-finals.

Athletes were Claudia Paula de Amorim Oliveira, Gleyse Priscila Portioli de Souza, Marcia Bonfim Vieira dos Santos, Denise Daniele Batista de Souza, Ana Carolina Duarte Ruas Custodio, and Neusimar Clemente dos Santos.

The following is the Brazil roster in the women's goalball tournament of the 2012 Summer Paralympics.

No.	Player	Age
2	Neusimar Clemente dos Santos	31
3	Ana Carolina Duarte Ruas Custodio	25
4	Denise Daniele Batista de Souza	27
5	Márcia Bonfim Vieira dos Santos	32
7	Gleyse Priscila Portioli de Souza	29
9	Claudia Paula G de Amorim Oliveira	36

30 August 2012; 19:45	Denmark	0 – 2	Brazil	Copper Box, London; Referees: Hooshang Shariati (IRI), Vilma Venckutonyte (LTU)
30 August 2012; 19:45		Report	Bonfim Vieira dos Santos 2	Copper Box, London; Referees: Hooshang Shariati (IRI), Vilma Venckutonyte (LTU)

31 August 2012; 16:15	Brazil	0 – 8	China	Copper Box, London; Referees: Juha Vuokila (FIN), Dina Murdie (GBR)
31 August 2012; 16:15		Report	Wang S. 5 Chen 1 Lin 1 Ju 1	Copper Box, London; Referees: Juha Vuokila (FIN), Dina Murdie (GBR)

2 September 2012; 09:00	Great Britain	3 – 1	Brazil	Copper Box, London; Referees: Ali Aldarsony (KSA), Morten Hammershoi (DEN)
2 September 2012; 09:00	Sharkey 2 Luke 1	Report	de Souza 1	Copper Box, London; Referees: Ali Aldarsony (KSA), Morten Hammershoi (DEN)

3 September 2012; 15:00	Brazil	5 – 4	Finland	Copper Box, London

Quarter-finals

5 September 2012; 10:30	Japan	2 – 0	Brazil	Copper Box, London
5 September 2012; 10:30		Report		Copper Box, London

=== 2016 Rio de Janeiro ===
As the host nation, the team competed in 2016 Summer Paralympics, with competition from Thursday 8 September to finals on Friday 16 September 2016, in the temporary Future Arena, Rio de Janeiro, Brazil.

The following is the Brazil roster in the women's goalball tournament of the 2016 Summer Paralympics.

No.	Player	Class	Date of birth (age)
1	Simone Rocha	B1	3 August 1976 (aged 40)
2	Neusimar Santos	B2	21 May 1981 (aged 35)
3	Ana Carolina Custodio	B2	23 April 1987 (aged 29)
5	Cláudia Oliveira	B1	29 June 1976 (aged 40)
7	Gleyse Portioli	B2	29 July 1983 (aged 33)
9	Victoria Amorim	B1	29 November 1997 (aged 18)

8 September 2016; 10:15	United States	3–7	Brazil	Future Arena, Rio de Janeiro; Referees: Joelle Boulet (CAN), Dawna Christy (CAN)
8 September 2016; 10:15	Miller 2 Dennis 1	Report	Amorim 6 Custodio 1	Future Arena, Rio de Janeiro; Referees: Joelle Boulet (CAN), Dawna Christy (CAN)

9 September 2016; 18:45	Brazil	1–2	Japan	Future Arena, Rio de Janeiro; Referees: Raili Sipura (FIN), Joelle Boulet (CAN)
9 September 2016; 18:45	Amorim 1	Report	Adachi 2	Future Arena, Rio de Janeiro; Referees: Raili Sipura (FIN), Joelle Boulet (CAN)

12 September 2016; 10:15	Brazil	7–2	Israel	Future Arena, Rio de Janeiro; Referees: Yoshinori Nii (JPN), Raquel Aguado (ESP)
12 September 2016; 10:15	Amorim 4 Custodio 3	Report	Mahamid 2	Future Arena, Rio de Janeiro; Referees: Yoshinori Nii (JPN), Raquel Aguado (ESP)

13 September 2016; 11:30	Algeria	0–10	Brazil	Future Arena, Rio de Janeiro; Referees: Patricia Fras (SLO), Dawna Christy (CAN)
13 September 2016; 11:30		Report	Amorim 6 Custodio 3 Rocha 1	Future Arena, Rio de Janeiro; Referees: Patricia Fras (SLO), Dawna Christy (CAN)

Quarter-finals

14 September 2016; 10:30	Brazil	10–0	Ukraine	Future Arena, Rio de Janeiro; Referees: Dawna Christy (CAN), Raili Sipura (FIN)
14 September 2016; 10:30	Amorim 7 Custodio 2 Rocha 1	Report		Future Arena, Rio de Janeiro; Referees: Dawna Christy (CAN), Raili Sipura (FIN)

Semi-finals

15 September 2016; 15:00	Brazil	3–4	China	Future Arena, Rio de Janeiro; Referees: Dawna Christy (CAN), Alexander Knecht (GER)
15 September 2016; 15:00	Custodio 2 Amorim 1	Report	Chen 3 Zhang W. 1	Future Arena, Rio de Janeiro; Referees: Dawna Christy (CAN), Alexander Knecht (GER)

Bronze Medal

16 September 2016; 13:30	Brazil	2–3	United States	Future Arena, Rio de Janeiro; Referees: Dawna Christy (CAN), Raquel Aguado (ESP)
16 September 2016; 13:30	Custodio 1 Amorim 1	Report	Armbruster 3	Future Arena, Rio de Janeiro; Referees: Dawna Christy (CAN), Raquel Aguado (ESP)

=== 2020 Tokyo ===
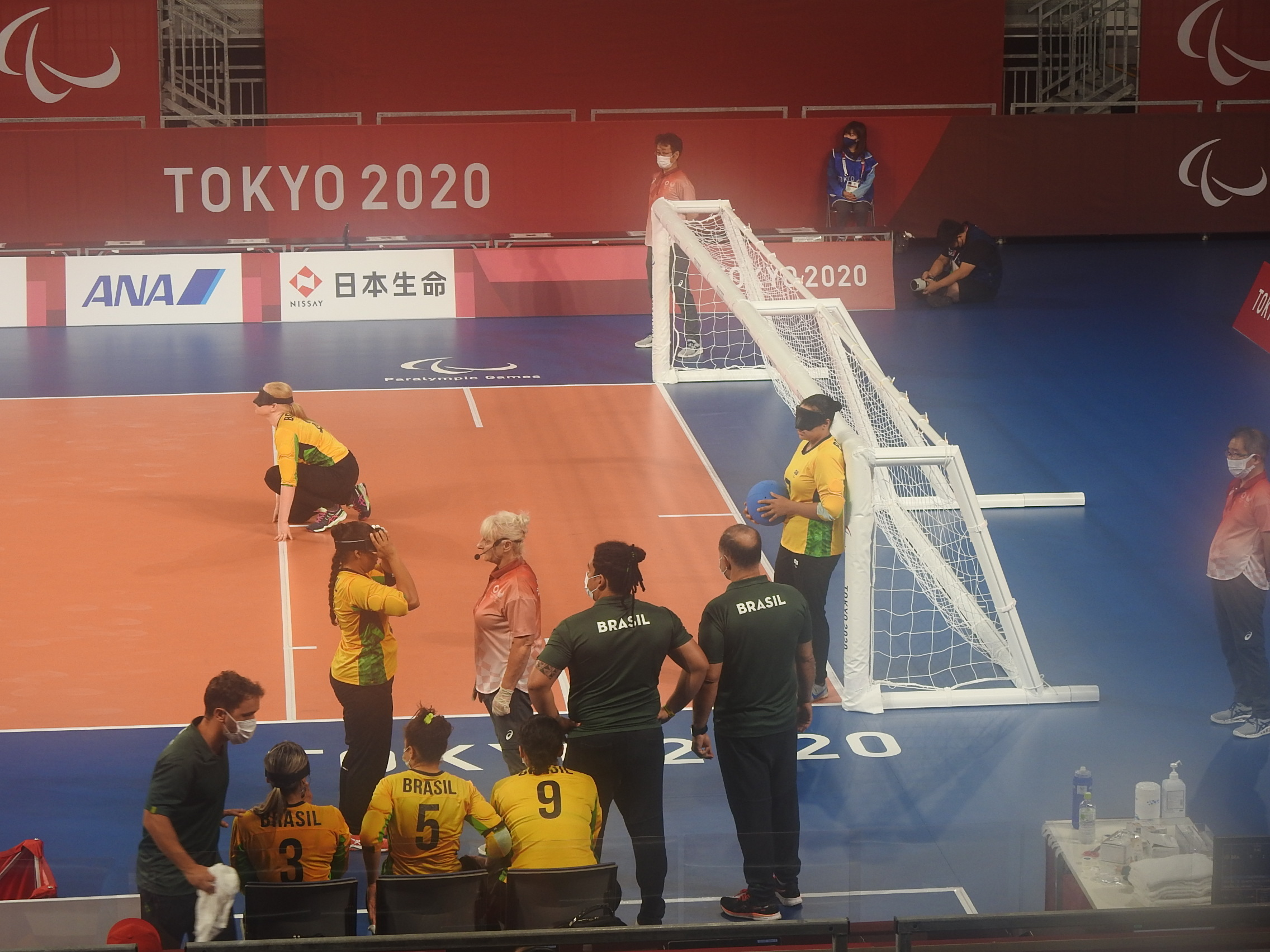
Brazil women's goalball team undergoing eyeshade checks. Makuhari Messe arena, 2020 Paralympic Games, Chiba, Tokyo, Japan (Aug 2021).

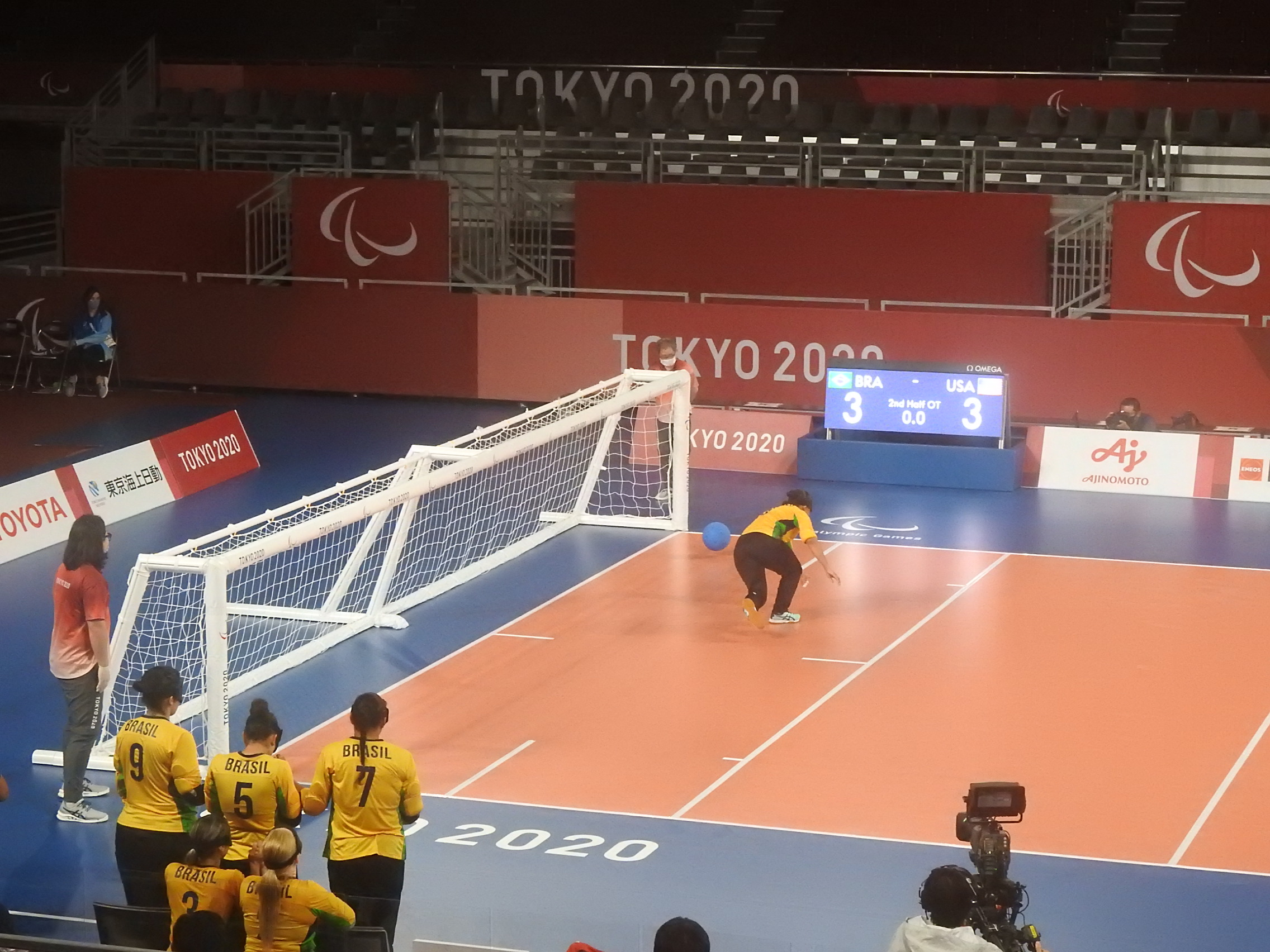
Brazil women's goalball team defending during extra-throws. Makuhari Messe arena, 2020 Paralympic Games, Chiba, Tokyo, Japan (Aug 2021).

The team competed in the 2020 Summer Paralympics, with competitionfrom Wednesday 25 August to finals on Friday 3 September 2021, in the Makuhari Messe arena, Chiba, Tokyo, Japan.

The following is the Brazil roster in the women's goalball tournament of the 2020 Summer Paralympics.

No.	Player	Class	Date of birth (age)
2	Ana Gabriely Assunção	B3	15 August 1990 (aged 30)
3	Ana Carolina Custódio	B2	23 April 1987 (aged 33)
5	Moniza Aparecida de Lima	B2	16 April 1998 (aged 22)
7	Kátia Aparecida Ferreira Silva	B1	24 April 1995 (aged 25)
8	Jéssica Gomes	B3	22 July 1993 (aged 27)
9	Victória Amorim	B1	29 November 1997 (aged 22)

Pos	Team	Pld	W	D	L	GF	GA	GD	Pts	Qualification
1	Turkey	4	3	0	1	30	11	+19	9	Quarterfinals
2	United States	4	3	0	1	22	10	+12	9	Quarterfinals
3	Japan (H)	4	2	1	1	18	13	+5	7	Quarterfinals
4	Brazil	4	1	1	2	23	19	+4	4	Quarterfinals
5	Egypt	4	0	0	4	3	43	−40	0	

Source: TOCOG
Rules for classification: 1) points; 2) goal difference; 3) number of wins; 4) goals against; 5) head-to-head goal difference.
(H) Hosts

Round-robin

25 August 2021
20:30

Brazil	4–6	United States
Custodio 1'; Amorim 9'; Gomes 16', 19'	Report	Czechowski 2'; Dennis 2', 14', 21'; Mason 5', 8'

Makuhari Messe, Tokyo
Referee: Warrick Jackes (Australia), Vaida Pokvytytė (Lithuania)

27 August 2021
10:30

Japan	4–4	Brazil
Temma 1'; Hagiwara 7', 10', 16'	Report	Custodio 14', 21'; Amorim 16', 21'

Makuhari Messe, Tokyo
Referee: Raquel Aguado Gómez (Spain), Svitlana Moroz (Ukraine)

28 August 2021
20:30

Turkey	8–4	Brazil
Sevd. Altunoluk 1', 1', 5', 16', 17', 23'; Güler 2', 3'	Report	Amorim 6', 10'; Custodio 13', 15'

Makuhari Messe, Tokyo
Referee: Svitlana Moroz (Ukraine), Raili Sipura (Finland)

30 August 2021
10:30

Brazil	11–1	Egypt
Gomes 1', 6', 7', 9', 11', 12', 15', 16'; Ferreira 13', 14'; Custodio 15'	Report	Elgabry 12'

Makuhari Messe, Tokyo
Referee: Launel Scott (Canada), Woradet Kultawongwattana (Thailand)

Quarter-finals

1 September 2021
17:45

China	0–1 (2OT)	Brazil
	Report	Custodio 28'

Makuhari Messe, Tokyo
Referee: Yoshinori Nii (Japan), Reza Dehghan (Iran)

Semi-finals

2 September 2021
19:30

Brazil	4–5 (ET)	United States
Gomes 7', 9'; Custodio 1 ET; Aparecida de Lima 1 ET	Report	Dennis 22', 24', 1 ET; Czechowski 1 ET; Mason 1 ET

Makuhari Messe, Tokyo
Referee: Vaida Pokvytytė (Lithuania), Robert Avery (Great Britain)

Bronze medal match

3 September 2021
13:15

Brazil	1–6	Japan
Amorim 22'	Report	Kakehata 2', 4', 12'; Hagiwara 4', 10', 20'

Makuhari Messe, Tokyo
Referee: Vaida Pokvytytė (Lithuania), Raili Sipura (Finland)

== World Championships ==
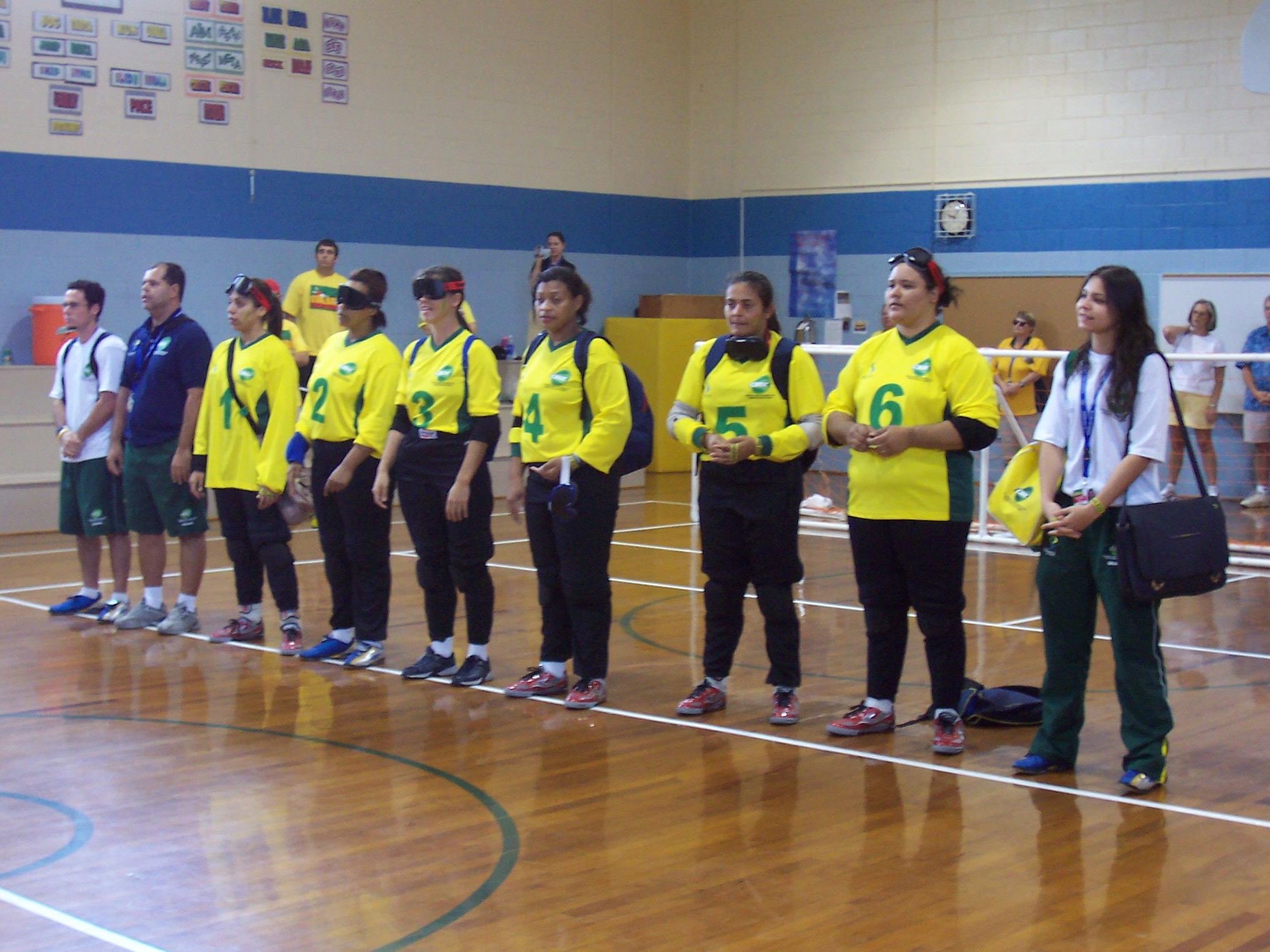
Brazil women's goalball team. Goalball World Championships, Spartanburg, South Carolina, USA (July 2006).

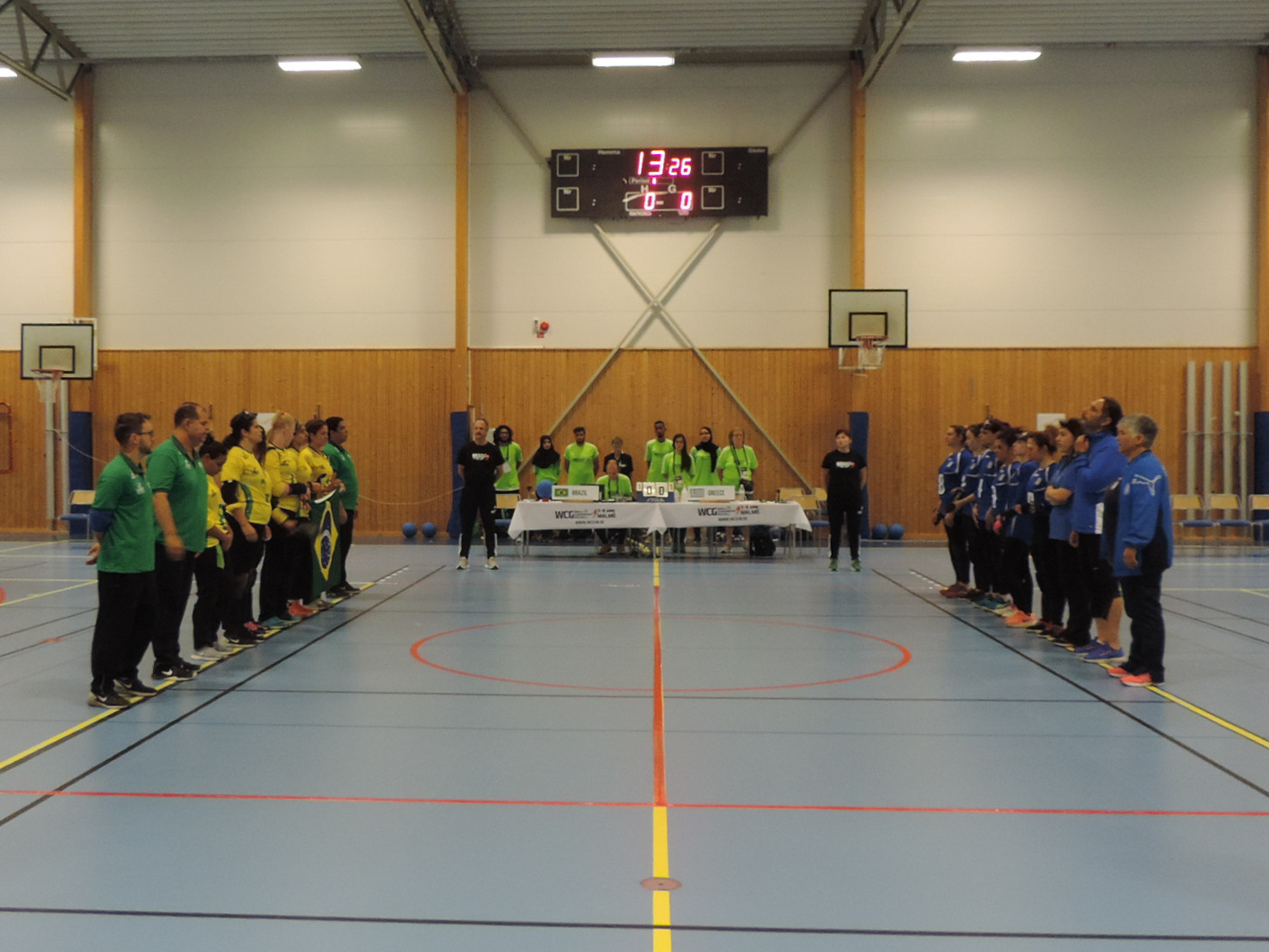
Brazil and Greece women's goalball teams line-up at the start of the first half. Goalball World Championships, Malmö, Sweden (June 2018).

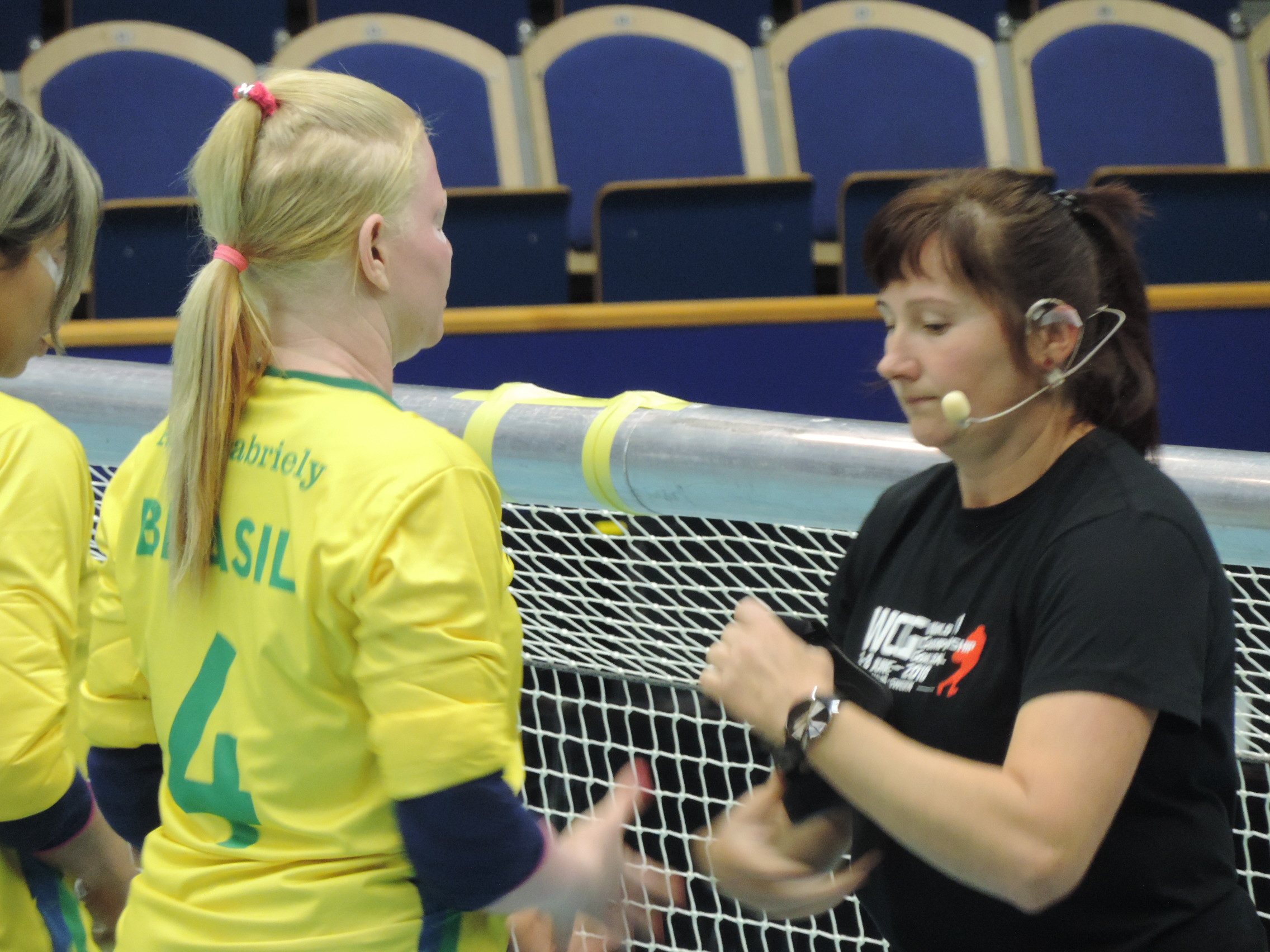
Brazil #4 having eyeshades checked. Goalball World Championships, Malmö, Sweden (June 2018).

=== 2002 Rio de Janeiro ===
The team competed in the 2002 World Championships, in Rio de Janeiro, Brazil, from 30 August 2002 to 8 September 2002. The team was one of ten teams participating, and they finished eighth overall.

=== 2006 Spartanburg ===
The team competed in the 2006 World Championships, in July 2006, in Spartanburg, South Carolina, United States of America. There were sixteen men's and thirteen women's teams. The team did not make the semi-finals.

=== 2014 Espoo ===
The team competed in the 2014 World Championships from 30 June to 5 July 2014, in Espoo, Finland. They placed fifth.

=== 2018 Malmö ===
The team competed in the 2014 World Championships from 30 June to 5 July 2014, in Espoo, Finland. Athletes for the event were: Alaine Lilian da Silva Marques, Ana Carolina Duarte Custódio Streets, Gleyse Priscila Portiolli Henrique, Jéssica Gomes Vitorino, Ana Gabriely Brito Assunção, and Moniza Aparecida de Lima. Coming first in Pool D, they beat Australia 5:2 in the quarter-finals, but were beaten by Turkey in the semi-finals, 2:5. They then beat Canada 7:2 for the bronze medal.

=== 2022 Matosinhos ===
The team competed in the 2022 World Championships from 7 to 16 December 2022, at the Centro de Desportos e Congressos de Matosinhos, Portugal. There were sixteen men's and sixteen women's teams. They placed fifth in Pool B, and ninth in final standings.

== IBSA World Games ==
=== 2003 Quebec City ===
The 2003 IBSA World Games were held in Quebec City, Canada with 10 teams competing. The first stage was pool play with 5 teams per pool and the top two teams in each pool advancing to the next round. The team made it out of the round robin round.

=== 2007 São Paulo ===
The team competed in the 2003 IBSA World Games, from 28 July 2007 to 8 August 2007, in São Paulo, Brazil. The women's goalball competition included thirteen teams. The competition was a 2008 Summer Paralympics qualifying event. Ana Carolina Duarte led the competition in scoring with 27 points. Brazil finished second after losing to Finland in overtime.

=== 2011 Antalya ===
The team competed in the 2011 IBSA World Games from 1 to 10 April 2011, in Antalya, Turkey, organised by the Turkish Blind Sports Federation. There were fifteen men's and fourteen women's teams. They placed eleventh in the final standings.

== Regional championships ==
The team competes in the IBSA America goalball region. The winner of the championships usually qualifies for a berth at the World Championships or the Paralympic Games.

=== 2005 São Paulo ===
The team competed at the 2005 IBSA Goalball Americas Regional Championships which were part of the Fourth IBSA Pan-American Games, the competition being from Monday 5 September 2005 to Friday 9 September 2005, in São Paulo, Brazil. There were five men's and three women's teams.

There were three women's teams competing: Brazil, Canada, and United States. Brazil finished first, with the United States second and Canada third.

=== 2011 Guadalajara ===
The team competed at the 2011 Parapan American Games from 13 to 19 November 2011, at the San Rafael Gymnasium in Guadalajara, Mexico. There were five women's teams: Brazil, Canada, El Salvador, Mexico, United States. Athletes were Jéssica Alves, Ana Custódio, Claudia Gonçalves, Gleyse Portioli, Neusimar Santos, and Márcia Vieira.

Brazil came second to USA in the finals.

=== 2013 Colorado Springs ===
The team competed at the 2013 Parapan American Games (which also hosted the 2013 IBSA World Youth Championships) from 11 to 14 July 2013, at Colorado Springs, Colorado, USA. There were three women's teams: Brazil, Canada, United States.

Brazil took the silver medal, losing to USA.

=== 2015 Toronto ===
The team competed at the 2015 Parapan American Games from 8 August 2015 to 15 August 2015, at the Mississauga Sports Centre, Toronto, Ontario, Canada. There were six women's teams: Brazil, Canada, El Salvador, Guatemala, Nicaragua, United States.

Brazil took the gold medal, beating USA.

=== 2017 São Paulo ===
The team competed at the 2017 IBSA Goalball Americas Championships from Wednesday 29 November 2017 to Sunday 3 December 2017, at São Paulo, Brazil. There were six women's teams: Brazil, Canada, Costa Rica, Mexico, Peru, United States.

Brazil took silver, with Canada taking the gold.

=== 2019 Lima ===
The team competed at the 2019 Parapan American Games from 23 August 2019 to 1 September 2019, at the Miguel Grau Coliseum, Lima, Peru. This championships was a qualifier for the 2020 Paralympic Games. There were six women's teams: Brazil, Canada, Costa Rica, Mexico, Peru, United States.

Brazil took gold, beating USA.

=== 2022 São Paulo ===
Due to the ongoing COVID-19 pandemic, the IBSA America championship moved from 6 to 13 November 2021, to 18 to 22 February 2022. The event was held at the Centro de Treinamento Paralímpico (Paralympic Training Center) in São Paulo. This championships was a qualifier for the 2022 World Championships.

There are twelve women's teams: Argentina, Brazil, Canada, Chile, Colombia, Costa Rica, Guatemala, Mexico, Nicaragua, Peru, United States, Venezuela.

In the round-robin section, the team mercied four of their five competitors (Venezuela (10:0), Colombia (11:1), Guatemala (10:0), and Peru (10:0)), and beating Mexico (8:1). In the quarter-finals they mercied Chile (10:0), narrowly beat USA in the semi-finals (5:4), before beating Canada (5:0) to take the gold medal. The national men's team also achieved gold medal success.

== Competitive history ==
The table below contains individual game results for the team in international matches and competitions.

Year	Event	Opponent	Date	Venue	Team	Team	Winner	Ref
2003	IBSA World Championships and Games	Ukraine	7 August	Quebec City, Canada	2	8	Brazil	
2003	IBSA World Championships and Games	China	7 August	Quebec City, Canada	3	5	Brazil	
2003	IBSA World Championships and Games	Algeria	7 August	Quebec City, Canada	0	10	Spain	
2003	IBSA World Championships and Games	Spain	7 August	Quebec City, Canada	1	2	Brazil	
2003	IBSA World Championships and Games	Japan	11 August	Quebec City, Canada	1	2	Brazil	
2003	IBSA World Championships and Games	Finland	10 August	Quebec City, Canada	1 OT	0 OT	Finland	
2005	IBSA Pan-American Games	Canada	5 September	São Paulo	3	1	Brazil	
2005	IBSA Pan-American Games	United States	5 September	São Paulo	5	2	Brazil	
2005	IBSA Pan-American Games	United States	6 September	São Paulo	1	4	Brazil	
2005	IBSA Pan-American Games	Canada	7 September	São Paulo	1	1		
2005	IBSA Pan-American Games	United States	7 September	São Paulo	1	0	Brazil	
2005	IBSA Pan-American Games	United States	8 September	São Paulo	1	2	United States	
2005	IBSA Pan-American Games	United States	9 September	São Paulo	1	0	United States	
2007	IBSA World Championships and Games	Spain	31 July	Brazil	5	8	Spain	
2007	IBSA World Championships and Games	Australia	1 August	Brazil	8	0	Brazil	
2007	IBSA World Championships and Games	South Korea	2 August	Brazil	1	11	Brazil	
2007	IBSA World Championships and Games	Ukraine	3 August	Brazil	7	1	Brazil	
2007	IBSA World Championships and Games	Japan	4 August	Brazil	4	1	Brazil	
2007	IBSA World Championships and Games	Finland	5 August	Brazil	3	4	Brazil	
2007	IBSA World Championships and Games	Sweden	5 August	Brazil	5	6	Sweden	
2007	IBSA World Championships and Games	Japan	6 August	Brazil	4 (3 OT)	4 (1 OT)	Japan	

=== Goal scoring by competition ===
Player	Goals	Competition	Notes	Ref
Ana Carolina Duarte	27	2007 IBSA World Championships and Games		
Cláudia Amorin	10	2007 IBSA World Championships and Games		
Marcia Vieira	8	2007 IBSA World Championships and Games		
Cláudia Amorin	7	2005 IBSA Pan-American Games		
Márcia Vieira	5	2005 IBSA Pan-American Games		
Adriana Lino	2	2007 IBSA World Championships and Games		
Simone Silva	2	2005 IBSA Pan-American Games		
Ana Carolina Duarte	1	2005 IBSA Pan-American Games		

== See also ==
- Disabled sports
- Brazil men's national goalball team
- Brazil at the Paralympics
