= United States women's national goalball team =

United States of America national team, for the Paralympic sport of goalball

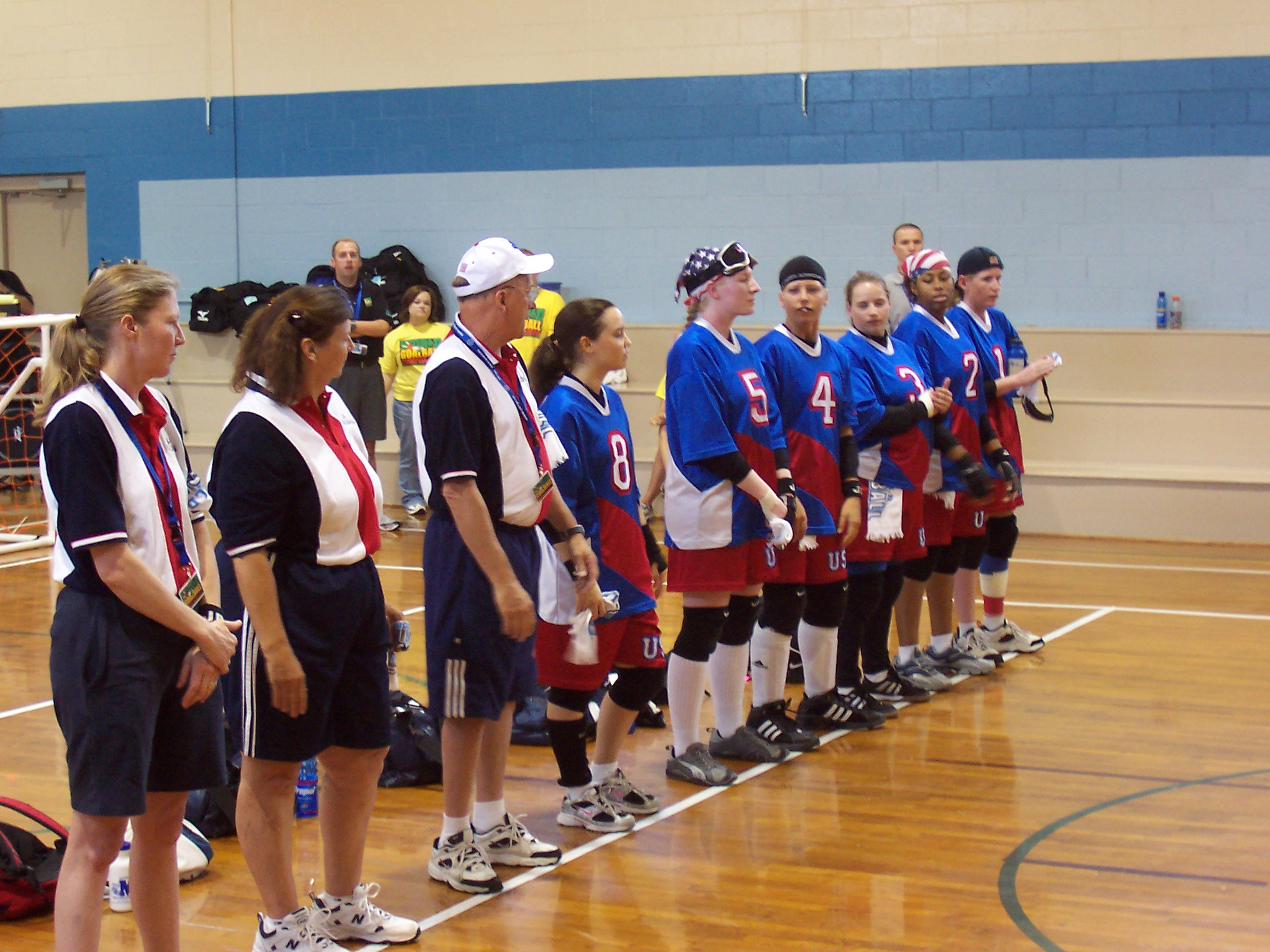
- United States women's goalball team. Goalball World Championships, Spartanburg, South Carolina, USA (July 2006).
- Sport: Goalball
- League: IBSA
- Division: Women
- Region: IBSA America
- Location: United States of America
- Colours: Red, White, Blue
- Head coach: Jake Czechowski (head coach); John Potts (assistant coach)
- Championships: Paralympic Games medals: : 2: 2: 2 World Championship medals: : 4: 2: 2
- Parent group: United States Association of Blind Athletes
- Website: www.usaba.org

United States women's national goalball team is the women's national team of the United States. Goalball is a team sport designed specifically for athletes with a vision impairment. The team takes part in international competitions.

== Paralympic Games ==
=== 1984 New York ===
The team competed in the 1984 Summer Paralympics at Long Island, New York City, United States of America. This was the first time women's teams competed. They finished first.

=== 1988 Seoul ===
The team competed in the 1988 Summer Paralympics, from 15 to 24 October 1988, in Seoul, South Korea. This was the first time the term "Paralympic" came into official use. The team finished second.

=== 1992 Barcelona ===
The team competed in the 1992 Summer Paralympics, from 3 to 14 September 1992, in the Pavelló de la Vall d'Hebron indoor stadium, Barcelona, Spain. They finished fifth.

=== 1996 Atlanta ===
The team competed in the 1996 Summer Paralympics, from 16 to 25 August 1996, in the GSU Sports Arena building, Atlanta, Georgia, United States of America. The team finished third.

=== 2000 Sydney ===
The team competed in the 2000 Summer Paralympics, between 18 and 29 October 2000, at an Olympic Park indoor hall, Sydney, New South Wales, Australia. They finished sixth.

=== 2004 Athens ===
The team competed in 2004 Summer Paralympics, between 17 and 28 September 2004, in the Faliro Sports Pavilion Arena, Athens, Greece. The team finished second.

=== 2008 Beijing ===
The team competed in 2008 Summer Paralympics, from 6 to 17 September 2008, in the Beijing Institute of Technology Gymnasium 'bat wing' arena, Beijing, China. There were 12 men's teams and 8 women's teams taking part in this event. They finished first, with China second, and Denmark third.

=== 2012 London ===
The team competed in the 2012 Summer Paralympics from 30 August to 7 September 2012, in the Copper Box Arena, London, England. They finished in eighth place.

The following is the American roster in the women's goalball tournament of the 2012 Summer Paralympics.

No.	Player	Age
1	Jen Armbruster	37
2	Amanda Dennis	18
3	Lisa Czechowski	33
4	Asya Miller	33
5	Robin Theryoung	33
6	Jordan Walters	23

Team	Pld	W	D	L	GF	GA	GD	Pts	Qualification
Canada	4	3	0	1	6	3	+3	9	Quarterfinals
Japan	4	2	1	1	5	3	+2	7	Quarterfinals
Sweden	4	2	1	1	11	11	0	7	Quarterfinals
United States	4	2	0	2	9	4	+5	6	Quarterfinals
Australia	4	0	0	4	7	17	−10	0	Eliminated

Source: "London 2012 Paralympic Games - Goalball results" (PDF). Paralympic.org. 3 October 2012 – via Goalball.sport.

30 August 2012; 21:00	United States	5 – 1	Sweden	Copper Box, London; Referees: Yasser Oman (EGY), Warrick Jackes (AUS)
30 August 2012; 21:00	Armbruster 3 Czechowski 1 Miller 1	Report	Jälmestål 1	Copper Box, London; Referees: Yasser Oman (EGY), Warrick Jackes (AUS)

1 September 2012; 15:00	Japan	2 – 1	United States	Copper Box, London

3 September 2012; 18:30	United States	3 – 0	Australia	Copper Box, London; Referees: Thomas Baerz (GER), Bulent Kimyon (TUR)
3 September 2012; 18:30	Armbruster 3	Report		Copper Box, London; Referees: Thomas Baerz (GER), Bulent Kimyon (TUR)

4 September 2012; 13:45	Canada	1 – 0	United States	Copper Box, London

Quarter-finals

5 September 2012; 09:00	China	5 – 0	United States	Copper Box, London; Referees: Dawna Christy (CAN), Juha Vuokila (FIN)
5 September 2012; 09:00	Chen 2 Wang S. 2 Lin 1	Report		Copper Box, London; Referees: Dawna Christy (CAN), Juha Vuokila (FIN)

=== 2016 Rio de Janeiro ===
The team competed in the 2016 Summer Paralympics, with competition from Thursday 8 September to finals on Friday 16 September 2016, in the temporary Future Arena, Rio de Janeiro, Brazil.

The Algerian women's team did not show up in time for its matches against the United States or Israel. The team missed connecting flights in Rome after setting out from a training camp in Poland. There were suspicions of a boycott. The International Paralympic Committee's spokesman, Craig Spence, said: "They are still sticking to their story that they suffered the worst transport issues known to man. Whether we believe it is a question mark and we are looking into it." Their first two games were recorded as 10–0 walkover wins for the other team. The team of Algeria arrived in Rio on 11 September. Spence remarked: "Fingers crossed they can manage to travel from the (Athletes') Village to the goalball venue in less than six days."

The team got the bronze medal, behind Turkey and China.

The following is the United States roster in the women's goalball tournament of the 2016 Summer Paralympics.

No.	Player	Class	Date of birth (age)
1	Jen Armbruster	B1	February 12, 1975 (aged 41)
3	Lisa Czechowski	B2	May 29, 1979 (aged 37)
4	Asya Miller	B3	October 16, 1979 (aged 36)
5	Amanda Dennis	B2	February 5, 1994 (aged 22)
7	Eliana Mason	B2	September 1, 1995 (aged 21)
9	Marybai Huking	B2	November 11, 1996 (aged 19)

Pos	Team	Pld	W	D	L	GF	GA	GD	Pts	Qualification
1	Brazil (H)	4	3	0	1	25	7	+18	9	Quarter-finals
2	United States	4	3	0	1	25	13	+12	9	Quarter-finals
3	Japan	4	2	1	1	13	8	+5	7	Quarter-finals
4	Israel	4	1	1	2	16	15	+1	4	Quarter-finals
5	Algeria	4	0	0	4	1	37	−36	0	

Source: Paralympic.org
(H) Hosts

8 September 2016; 10:15	United States	3–7	Brazil	Future Arena, Rio de Janeiro; Referees: Joelle Boulet (CAN), Dawna Christy (CAN)
8 September 2016; 10:15	Miller 2 Dennis 1	Report	Amorim 6 Custodio 1	Future Arena, Rio de Janeiro; Referees: Joelle Boulet (CAN), Dawna Christy (CAN)

9 September 2016; 14:30	Algeria	0–10 (walkover)	United States

11 September 2016; 10:45	United States	5–3	Japan	Future Arena, Rio de Janeiro; Referees: Nejc Jakic (SLO), Raquel Aguado (ESP)
11 September 2016; 10:45	Armbruster 2 Miller 2 Dennis 1	Report	Temma 1 Adachi 1 Komiya 1	Future Arena, Rio de Janeiro; Referees: Nejc Jakic (SLO), Raquel Aguado (ESP)

13 September 2016; 09:00	Israel	3–7	United States	Future Arena, Rio de Janeiro; Referees: Raquel Aguado (ESP), Dawna Christy (CAN)
13 September 2016; 09:00	Ben-David 3	Report	Miller 4 Czechowski 2 Dennis 1	Future Arena, Rio de Janeiro; Referees: Raquel Aguado (ESP), Dawna Christy (CAN)

Quarter-finals

14 September 2016; 19:30	United States	2–0	Canada	Future Arena, Rio de Janeiro; Referees: Vilma Basinkaite (LTU), Daniel Voltan (BRA)
14 September 2016; 19:30	Armbruster 2	Report		Future Arena, Rio de Janeiro; Referees: Vilma Basinkaite (LTU), Daniel Voltan (BRA)

Semi-finals

15 September 2016; 20:00	Turkey	11–1	United States	Future Arena, Rio de Janeiro; Referees: Vilma Basinkaite (LTU), Nejc Jakic (SLO)
15 September 2016; 20:00	Altunoluk 8 Yıldız 2 Özcan 1	Report	Miller 1	Future Arena, Rio de Janeiro; Referees: Vilma Basinkaite (LTU), Nejc Jakic (SLO)

Finals

16 September 2016; 13:30	Brazil	2–3	United States	Future Arena, Rio de Janeiro; Referees: Dawna Christy (CAN), Raquel Aguado (ESP)
16 September 2016; 13:30	Custodio 1 Amorim 1	Report	Armbruster 3	Future Arena, Rio de Janeiro; Referees: Dawna Christy (CAN), Raquel Aguado (ESP)

=== 2020 Tokyo ===
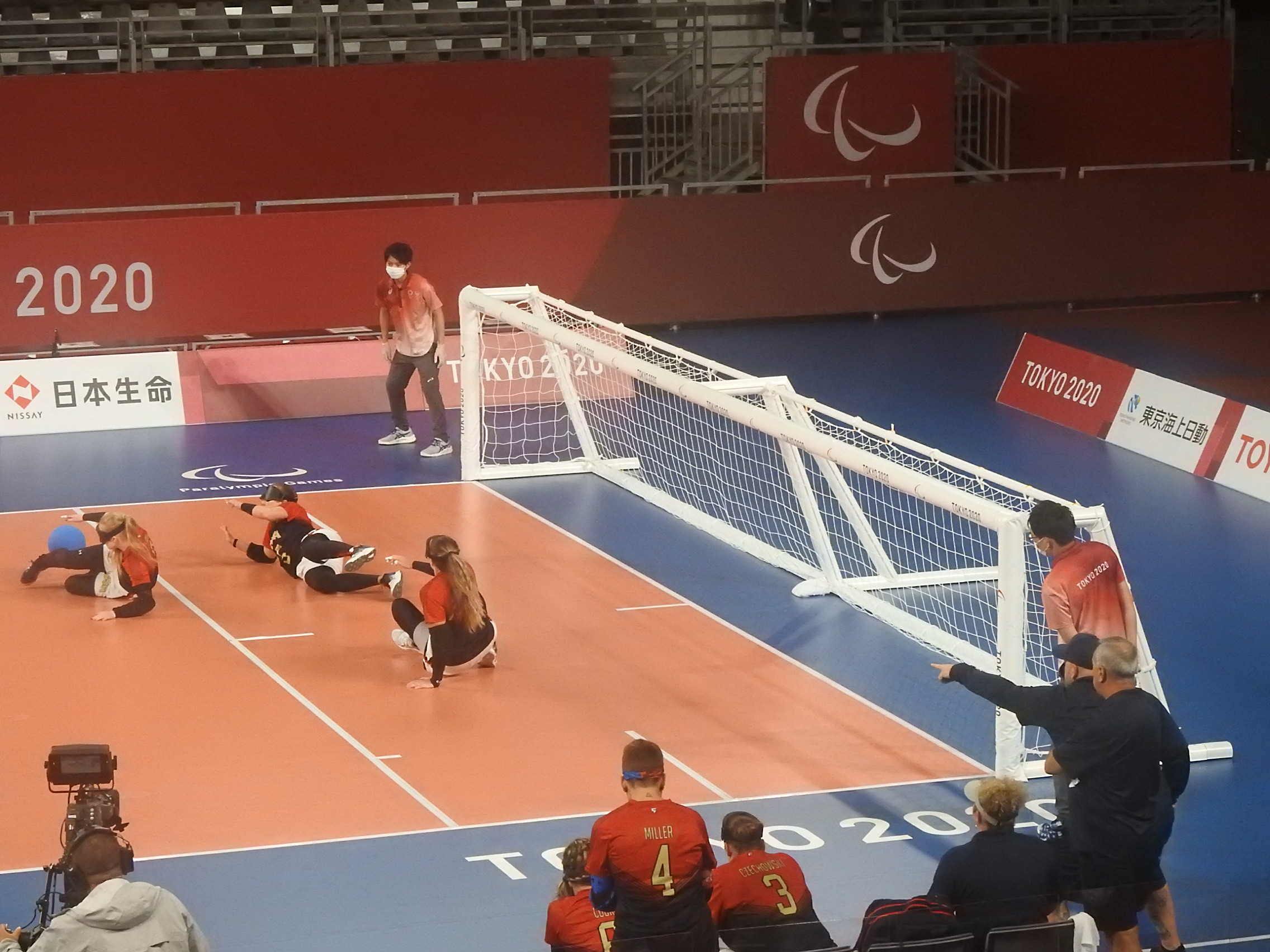
United States women's goalball team defending a throw from Brazil. Makuhari Messe arena, 2020 Paralympic Games, Chiba, Tokyo, Japan (Aug 2021).

The team competed in the 2020 Summer Paralympics, with competition from Wednesday 25 August to finals on Friday 3 September 2021, in the Makuhari Messe arena, Chiba, Tokyo, Japan. They won the assigned IBSA America slot at the 2019 Parapan American Games.

The following is the United States roster in the women's goalball tournament of the 2020 Summer Paralympics.

No.	Player	Class	Date of birth (age)
3	Lisa Czechowski	B2	May 29, 1979 (aged 42)
4	Asya Miller	B3	October 16, 1979 (aged 41)
5	Amanda Dennis	B2	February 5, 1994 (aged 27)
6	Mindy Cook	B3	September 23, 1988 (aged 32)
7	Eliana Mason	B2	September 1, 1995 (aged 25)
9	Marybai Huking	B2	November 11, 1996 (aged 24)

Pos	Team	Pld	W	D	L	GF	GA	GD	Pts	Qualification
1	Turkey	4	3	0	1	30	11	+19	9	Quarterfinals
2	United States	4	3	0	1	22	10	+12	9	Quarterfinals
3	Japan (H)	4	2	1	1	18	13	+5	7	Quarterfinals
4	Brazil	4	1	1	2	23	19	+4	4	Quarterfinals
5	Egypt	4	0	0	4	3	43	−40	0	

Source: TOCOG
Rules for classification: 1) points; 2) goal difference; 3) number of wins; 4) goals against; 5) head-to-head goal difference.
(H) Hosts

Round-robin

25 August 2021
20:30

Brazil	4–6	United States
Custodio 1'; Amorim 9'; Gomes 16', 19'	Report	Czechowski 2'; Dennis 2', 14', 21'; Mason 5', 8'

Makuhari Messe, Tokyo
Referee: Warrick Jackes (Australia), Vaida Pokvytytė (Lithuania)

27 August 2021
19:00

United States	10–0	Egypt
Dennis 1', 4', 5', 6'; Czechowski 5', 12'; Mason 7', 8'; Miller 11', 15'	Report

Makuhari Messe, Tokyo
Referee: Vaida Pokvytytė (Lithuania), Bas Spaans (Netherlands)

28 August 2021
13:15

Japan	3–2	United States
Hagiwara 8', 11'; Wakasugi 17'	Report	Dennis 8', 19'

Makuhari Messe, Tokyo
Referee: Launel Scott (Canada), Woradet Kultawongwattana (Thailand)

30 August 2021
19:00

United States	4–3	Turkey
Mason 8'; Miller 11'; Dennis 13', 22'	Report	Sevd. Altunoluk 1', 4', 9'

Makuhari Messe, Tokyo
Referee: Raquel Aguado Gómez (Spain), Svitlana Moroz (Ukraine)

Quarter-finals

1 September 2021
19:30

United States	5–3	RPC
Mason 4', 8', 19'; Dennis 14', 19'	Report	Arestova 2', 7', 9'

Makuhari Messe, Tokyo
Referee: Romualdas Vaitiekus (Lithuania), Robert Avery (Great Britain)

Semi-finals

2 September 2021
19:30

Brazil	4–5 (ET)	United States
Gomes 7', 9'; Custodio 1 ET; Aparecida de Lima 1 ET	Report	Dennis 22', 24', 1 ET; Czechowski 1 ET; Mason 1 ET

Makuhari Messe, Tokyo
Referee: Vaida Pokvytytė (Lithuania), Robert Avery (Great Britain)

Gold medal match

3 September 2021
17:45

United States	2–9	Turkey
Mason 9'; Miller 22'	Report	Sevd. Altunoluk 1', 1', 5', 6', 6', 8', 18', 18', 20'

Makuhari Messe, Tokyo
Referee: Raquel Aguado Gómez (Spain), Svitlana Moroz (Ukraine)

== World Championships ==
=== 1982 Indianapolis ===
The team competed in the 1982 World Championships, at Butler University in Indianapolis, Indiana, United States of America. The team was one of six teams participating, and they finished first overall.

=== 1986 Roermond ===
The 1986 IBSA World Goalball Championships were held in Roermond, the Netherlands. The team was one of ten teams participating, and they finished first overall.

=== 1990 Calgary ===
The team competed in the 1990 World Championships, in Calgary, Alberta, Canada. The team was one of seven teams participating, and they finished second overall.

=== 1994 Colorado Springs ===
The team competed in the 1994 World Championships, in Colorado Springs, Colorado, United States of America. The team was one of nine teams participating, and they finished eighth overall.

=== 1998 Madrid ===
The team competed in the 1998 World Championships, in Madrid, Spain. The team was one of eleven teams participating, and they finished third overall.

=== 2002 Rio de Janeiro ===
The team competed in the 2002 World Championships, in Rio de Janeiro, Brazil, from 30 August 2002 to 8 September 2002. The team was one of ten teams participating, and they finished first overall.

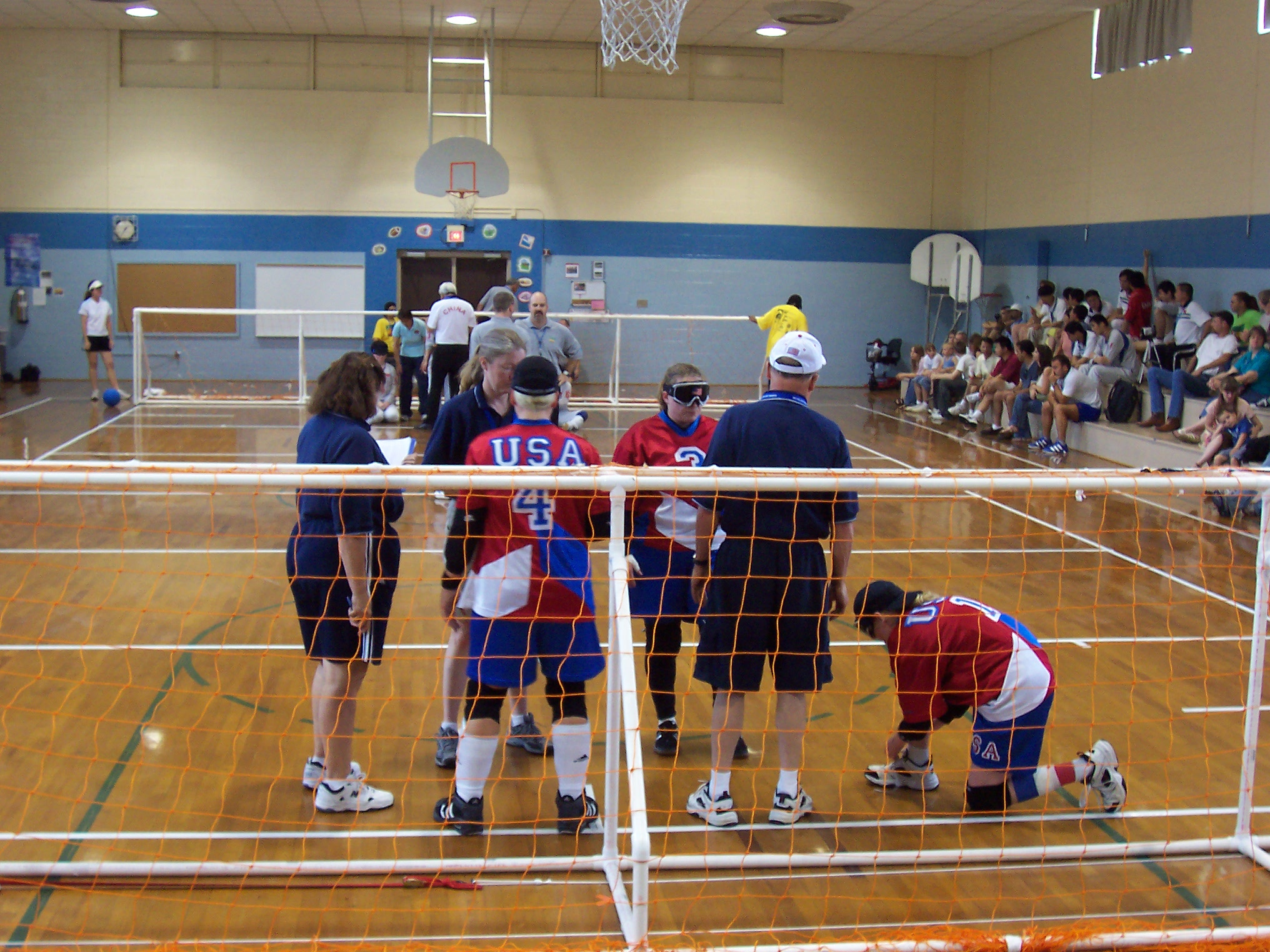
United States women's goalball team taking a time-out with China. Goalball World Championships, Spartanburg, South Carolina, USA (July 2006).

=== 2006 Spartanburg ===
As the host nation, the team competed in the 2006 World Championships, in July 2006, in Spartanburg, South Carolina, United States of America.

Beaten by China 3:2 in the semi-finals, USA beat Denmark 4:2 to get the bronze medal.

=== 2010 Sheffield ===
The team competed in the 2010 World Championships, from 20 to 25 June 2010, in Sheffield, England, in Pool X, winning all their games against Australia, Canada, Greece, Israel, and Sweden.

The team beat all competition in their pool: Canada 6:1, Israel 3:1, Australia 7:4, Sweden 5:0, and Greece 3:1.

=== 2014 Espoo ===
The team competed in the 2014 World Championships from 30 June to 5 July 2014, in Espoo, Finland. They placed fourth of six in Pool X, winning against Finland 7:2 and Germany 4:3, but being beaten by Russia 0:3, Turkey 2:8, and Japan 3:4. They progressed to the quarter-finals, beating Brazil 5:3, and going to the semi-finals, where they beat Japan 2:0. In the gold medal match, they beat Russian 3:0 to take the gold medal.

Athletes were: Jennifer Armbruster (#1), Amanda Dennis (#2), Jordan Gist (#6), Marybai Huking (#7), Eliana Mason (#9), and Asya Miller (#4).

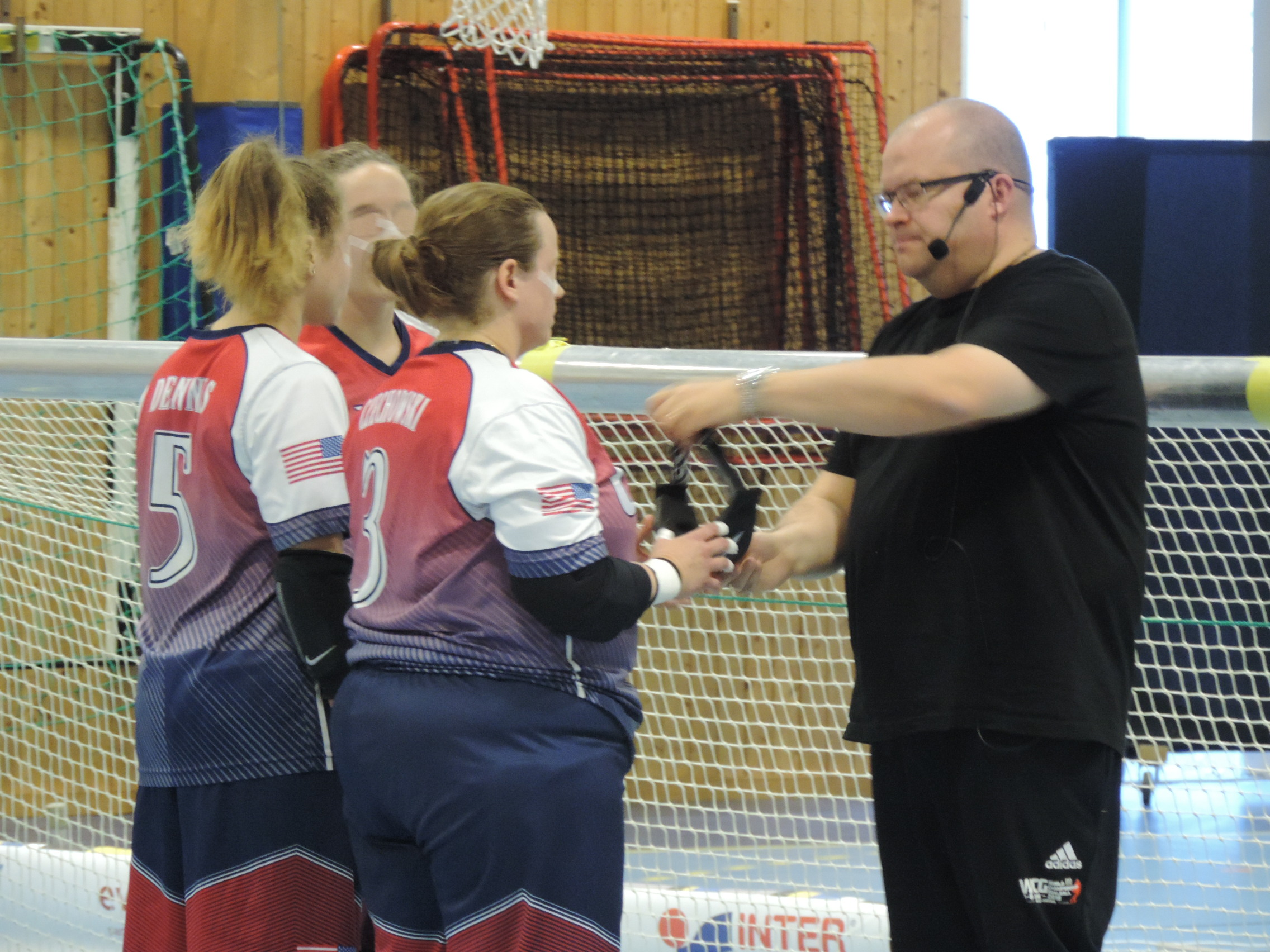
United States women's goalball team. Goalball World Championships, Malmö, Sweden (June 2018).

=== 2018 Malmö ===
The team competed in the 2018 World Championships from 3 to 8 June 2018, at the Baltiska Hallen, Malmö, Sweden. They placed third of six in Pool D, lost to Turkey 2:12 in the quarter-finals, and placed sixth in final standings.

Representing the 2018 team for the championships are: Lisa Czechowski (Fort Wayne, Indiana), Amanda Dennis (Peachtree City, Georgia), Marybai Huking (Plain City, Utah), Eliana Mason (Beaverton, Oregon), Asya Miller (Portland, Oregon), Bryanna Stubbert (Oceanside, California). Stubbert was new to the team. Head coach was Jake Czechowski (Fort Wayne, Indiana). Former national goalball high-performance director John Potts was appointed as team leader for both the men's and women's teams.

=== 2022 Matosinhos ===
The team secured a berth in the 2022 World Championships, by placing second in the 2020 Paralympic Games.

The team competed in the 2022 World Championships from 7 to 16 December 2022, at the Centro de Desportos e Congressos de Matosinhos, Portugal. There were sixteen men's and sixteen women's teams. They placed third in Pool B, and sixth in final standings.

== Regional championships ==
The team competes in the IBSA America goalball region. The winner of the championships usually qualifies for a berth at the World Championships or the Paralympic Games.

=== 2005 São Paulo ===
The team competed at the 2005 IBSA Goalball Americas Regional Championships which were part of the Fourth IBSA Pan-American Games, the competition being from Monday 5 September 2005 to Friday 9 September 2005, in São Paulo, Brazil. There were three women's teams competing: Brazil, Canada, and USA. Brazil finished first, with the United States second and Canada third.

=== 2011 Guadalajara ===
The team competed at the 2011 Parapan American Games from 13 to 19 November 2011, at the San Rafael Gymnasium in Guadalajara, Mexico. There were five women's teams: Brazil, Canada, El Salvador, Mexico, USA. Athletes were: Jennifer Armbruster, Nicole Buck, Lisa Czechowski, Amanda Dennis, Asya Miller, and Robin Theryoung.

USA beat Brazil for the gold medal.

=== 2013 Colorado Springs ===
The team competed at the 2013 Parapan American Games (which also hosted the 2013 IBSA World Youth Championships) from 11 to 14 July 2013, at Colorado Springs, Colorado, USA. There were three women's teams: Brazil, Canada, USA. Athletes were Jen Armbruster (Portland, OR), Lisa Czechowski (Tucson, AZ), Amanda Dennis (Peachtree City, GA), Jordan Gist (Fargo, ND), Asya Miller (Portland, OR), and Cathy Morgan (Logan, UT).

USA beat Brazil for the gold medal.

=== 2015 Toronto ===
The team competed at the 2015 Parapan American Games from 8 August 2015 to 15 August 2015, at the Mississauga Sports Centre, Toronto, Ontario, Canada. There were six women's teams: Brazil, Canada, El Salvador, Guatemala, Nicaragua, USA. Athletes were: Jennifer Armbruster, Lisa Czechowski, Amanda Dennis, Marybai Huking, Eliana Mason, and Asya Miller.

USA came second to Brazil.

=== 2017 São Paulo ===
The team competed at the 2017 IBSA Goalball Americas Championships from Wednesday 29 November 2017 to Sunday 3 December 2017, at São Paulo, Brazil. There were six women's teams: Brazil, Canada, Costa Rica, Mexico, Peru, USA.

United States came third behind Brazil and Canada.

=== 2019 Lima ===
The team competed at the 2019 Parapan American Games from 23 August 2019 to 1 September 2019, at the Miguel Grau Coliseum, Lima, Peru. This championships was a qualifier for the 2020 Paralympic Games. There were six women's teams: Brazil, Canada, Costa Rica, Mexico, Peru, USA.

USA came second to Brazil in the finals.

=== 2022 São Paulo ===
Due to the ongoing COVID-19 pandemic, the IBSA America championship moved from 6 to 13 November 2021, to 18 to 22 February 2022. The event is being held at the Centro de Treinamento Paralímpico (Paralympic Training Center) in São Paulo. This championships is a qualifier for the 2022 World Championships.

There are twelve women's teams: Argentina, Brazil, Canada, Chile, Colombia, Costa Rica, Guatemala, Mexico, Nicaragua, Peru, USA, Venezuela.

The team is Lisa Czechowski (Boonton, NJ), Libby Daugherty (Mesquite, TX), Ali Lawson Trippe (Jasper, GA), Eliana Mason (Beaverton, OR), Asya Miller (Portland, OR), and Jake Czechowski (head coach), John Potts (assistant coach), Jennifer Brown (trainer).

== Competitive history ==
The table below contains individual game results for the team in international matches and competitions.

Year	Event	Opponent	Date	Venue	Team	Team	Winner	Ref
2005	IBSA Pan-American Games	Brazil	5 September	São Paulo	5	2	Brazil	
2005	IBSA Pan-American Games	Canada	6 September	São Paulo	2	1	United States	
2005	IBSA Pan-American Games	Brazil	6 September	São Paulo	1	4	Brazil	
2005	IBSA Pan-American Games	Canada	7 September	São Paulo	3	3		
2005	IBSA Pan-American Games	Brazil	8 September	São Paulo	1	2	United States	
2005	IBSA Pan-American Games	Canada	8 September	São Paulo	6	7	Canada	
2005	IBSA Pan-American Games	Brazil	9 September	São Paulo	1	0	United States	

=== Goal scoring by competition ===
Player	Goals	Competition	Notes	Ref
Jen Armbruster	7	2005 IBSA Pan-American Games		
Asya Miller	4	2005 IBSA Pan-American Games		
Lisa Banta	3	2005 IBSA Pan-American Games		

== See also ==
- Disabled sports
- United States men's national goalball team
- United States at the Paralympics
