= Goalball at the 2016 Summer Paralympics – Women's tournament =

The women's tournament in Goalball at the 2016 Summer Paralympics was contested from 8 to 16 September. 28 matches were played; 20 in the group play, 4 quarter-finals, 2 semi-finals, a bronze medal match, and a gold medal match.

Ten teams participated, with six athletes per team.

== Participating teams ==
Group C

- Algeria (roster)
- Brazil (roster)
- Israel (roster)
- Japan (roster)
- United States (roster)

Group D

- Australia (roster)
- Canada (roster)
- China (roster)
- Turkey (roster)
- Ukraine (roster)

== Preliminary round ==
=== Group C ===
Pos	Team	Pld	W	D	L	GF	GA	GD	Pts	Qualification
1	Brazil (H)	4	3	0	1	25	7	+18	9	Quarter-finals
2	United States	4	3	0	1	25	13	+12	9	Quarter-finals
3	Japan	4	2	1	1	13	8	+5	7	Quarter-finals
4	Israel	4	1	1	2	16	15	+1	4	Quarter-finals
5	Algeria	4	0	0	4	1	37	−36	0	

Source: Paralympic.org
(H) Hosts

8 September 2016; 10:15	United States	3–7	Brazil	Future Arena, Rio de Janeiro; Referees: Joelle Boulet (CAN), Dawna Christy (CAN)
8 September 2016; 10:15	Miller 2 Dennis 1	Report	Amorim 6 Custodio 1	Future Arena, Rio de Janeiro; Referees: Joelle Boulet (CAN), Dawna Christy (CAN)

8 September 2016; 14:30	Japan	1–1	Israel	Future Arena, Rio de Janeiro; Referees: Alexander Knecht (GER), Vilma Basinkaite (LTU)
8 September 2016; 14:30	Wakasugi 1	Report	Mahamid 1	Future Arena, Rio de Janeiro; Referees: Alexander Knecht (GER), Vilma Basinkaite (LTU)

9 September 2016; 14:30	Algeria	0–10 (walkover)	United States

9 September 2016; 18:45	Brazil	1–2	Japan	Future Arena, Rio de Janeiro; Referees: Raili Sipura (FIN), Joelle Boulet (CAN)
9 September 2016; 18:45	Amorim 1	Report	Adachi 2	Future Arena, Rio de Janeiro; Referees: Raili Sipura (FIN), Joelle Boulet (CAN)

10 September 2016; 18:45	Israel	10–0 (walkover)	Algeria

11 September 2016; 10:45	United States	5–3	Japan	Future Arena, Rio de Janeiro; Referees: Nejc Jakic (SLO), Raquel Aguado (ESP)
11 September 2016; 10:45	Armbruster 2 Miller 2 Dennis 1	Report	Temma 1 Adachi 1 Komiya 1	Future Arena, Rio de Janeiro; Referees: Nejc Jakic (SLO), Raquel Aguado (ESP)

12 September 2016; 10:15	Brazil	7–2	Israel	Future Arena, Rio de Janeiro; Referees: Yoshinori Nii (JPN), Raquel Aguado (ESP)
12 September 2016; 10:15	Amorim 4 Custodio 3	Report	Mahamid 2	Future Arena, Rio de Janeiro; Referees: Yoshinori Nii (JPN), Raquel Aguado (ESP)

12 September 2016; 15:30	Japan	7–1	Algeria	Future Arena, Rio de Janeiro; Referees: Nejc Jakic (SLO), Rudi Janssen (BEL)
12 September 2016; 15:30	Temma 3 Kakehata 2 Adachi 2	Report	Benallou 1	Future Arena, Rio de Janeiro; Referees: Nejc Jakic (SLO), Rudi Janssen (BEL)

13 September 2016; 09:00	Israel	3–7	United States	Future Arena, Rio de Janeiro; Referees: Raquel Aguado (ESP), Dawna Christy (CAN)
13 September 2016; 09:00	Ben-David 3	Report	Miller 4 Czechowski 2 Dennis 1	Future Arena, Rio de Janeiro; Referees: Raquel Aguado (ESP), Dawna Christy (CAN)

13 September 2016; 11:30	Algeria	0–10	Brazil	Future Arena, Rio de Janeiro; Referees: Patricia Fras (SLO), Dawna Christy (CAN)
13 September 2016; 11:30		Report	Amorim 6 Custodio 3 Rocha 1	Future Arena, Rio de Janeiro; Referees: Patricia Fras (SLO), Dawna Christy (CAN)

=== Group D ===
Pos	Team	Pld	W	D	L	GF	GA	GD	Pts	Qualification
1	Turkey	4	4	0	0	37	11	+26	12	Quarter-finals
2	China	4	3	0	1	21	14	+7	9	Quarter-finals
3	Canada	4	2	0	2	16	22	−6	6	Quarter-finals
4	Ukraine	4	0	1	3	9	17	−8	1	Quarter-finals
5	Australia	4	0	1	3	6	25	−19	1	

Source: Paralympic.org

8 September 2016; 18:45	Australia	2–5	China	Future Arena, Rio de Janeiro; Referees: Vilma Basinkaite (LTU), Yoshinori Nii (JPN)
8 September 2016; 18:45	Horsburgh 1 Esdaile 1	Report	Zhang W. 4 Chen 1	Future Arena, Rio de Janeiro; Referees: Vilma Basinkaite (LTU), Yoshinori Nii (JPN)

9 September 2016; 10:15	Turkey	12–4	Canada	Future Arena, Rio de Janeiro; Referees: Raili Sipura (FIN), Alexander Knecht (GER)
9 September 2016; 10:15	Altunoluk 8 Özcan 2 Mercan 2	Report	Burk 4	Future Arena, Rio de Janeiro; Referees: Raili Sipura (FIN), Alexander Knecht (GER)

10 September 2016; 10:15	Ukraine	2–2	Australia	Future Arena, Rio de Janeiro; Referees: Bülent Kimyon (TUR), Daniel Voltan (BRA)
10 September 2016; 10:15	Rud 2	Report	Horsburgh 1 Esdaile 1	Future Arena, Rio de Janeiro; Referees: Bülent Kimyon (TUR), Daniel Voltan (BRA)

10 September 2016; 14:30	China	2–7	Turkey	Future Arena, Rio de Janeiro; Referees: Dawna Christy (CAN), Nejc Jakic (SLO)
10 September 2016; 14:30	Zhang W. 1 Ju 1	Report	Altunoluk 7	Future Arena, Rio de Janeiro; Referees: Dawna Christy (CAN), Nejc Jakic (SLO)

11 September 2016; 14:30	Canada	3–2	Ukraine	Future Arena, Rio de Janeiro; Referees: Raquel Aguado (ESP), Daniel Voltan (BRA)
11 September 2016; 14:30	Burk 2 Bogart 1	Report	Rud 2	Future Arena, Rio de Janeiro; Referees: Raquel Aguado (ESP), Daniel Voltan (BRA)

11 September 2016; 18:45	Australia	2–12	Turkey	Future Arena, Rio de Janeiro; Referees: Joelle Boulet (CAN), Raili Sipura (FIN)
11 September 2016; 18:45	Horsburgh 2	Report	Özcan 5 Mercan 5 Yıldız 1 Altunoluk 1	Future Arena, Rio de Janeiro; Referees: Joelle Boulet (CAN), Raili Sipura (FIN)

12 September 2016; 18:15	China	8–3	Canada	Future Arena, Rio de Janeiro; Referees: Vilma Basinkaite (LTU), Yoshinori Nii (JPN)
12 September 2016; 18:15	Zhang W. 7 Ju 1	Report	Andrews 2 Morin 1	Future Arena, Rio de Janeiro; Referees: Vilma Basinkaite (LTU), Yoshinori Nii (JPN)

12 September 2016; 20:45	Turkey	6–3	Ukraine	Future Arena, Rio de Janeiro; Referees: Rudi Janssen (BEL), Nejc Jakic (SLO)
12 September 2016; 20:45	Mercan 2 Altunoluk 2 Özcan 1 Yıldız 1	Report	Rud 2 Govorukha 1	Future Arena, Rio de Janeiro; Referees: Rudi Janssen (BEL), Nejc Jakic (SLO)

13 September 2016; 15:30	Canada	6–0	Australia	Future Arena, Rio de Janeiro; Referees: Daniel Voltan (BRA), Raili Sipura (FIN)
13 September 2016; 15:30	Burk 6	Report		Future Arena, Rio de Janeiro; Referees: Daniel Voltan (BRA), Raili Sipura (FIN)

13 September 2016; 19:30	Ukraine	2–6	China	Future Arena, Rio de Janeiro; Referees: Bülent Kimyon (TUR), Vilma Basinkaite (LTU)
13 September 2016; 19:30	Rud 1 Miroshnyk 1	Report	Zhang W. 3 Chen 3	Future Arena, Rio de Janeiro; Referees: Bülent Kimyon (TUR), Vilma Basinkaite (LTU)

== Knock-out round ==
Quarter-finals
14 September
Brazil	10
Ukraine	0
14 September
China	5
Japan	3
14 September
Turkey	15
Israel	5
14 September
United States	2
Canada	0

Semi-finals
15 September
Brazil	3
China	4
15 September
Turkey	11
United States	1

Gold medal
16 September
China	1
Turkey	4
Bronze medal
16 September
Brazil	2
United States	3

=== Quarter-finals ===
14 September 2016; 10:30	Brazil	10–0	Ukraine	Future Arena, Rio de Janeiro; Referees: Dawna Christy (CAN), Raili Sipura (FIN)
14 September 2016; 10:30	Amorim 7 Custodio 2 Rocha 1	Report		Future Arena, Rio de Janeiro; Referees: Dawna Christy (CAN), Raili Sipura (FIN)

14 September 2016; 14:15	China	5–3	Japan	Future Arena, Rio de Janeiro; Referees: Joelle Boulet (CAN), Nejc Jakic (SLO)
14 September 2016; 14:15	Zhang W. 2 Chen 1 Zhang H. 1 Ju 1	Report	Kakehata 1 Adachi 1 Komiya 1	Future Arena, Rio de Janeiro; Referees: Joelle Boulet (CAN), Nejc Jakic (SLO)

14 September 2016; 19:30	United States	2–0	Canada	Future Arena, Rio de Janeiro; Referees: Vilma Basinkaite (LTU), Daniel Voltan (BRA)
14 September 2016; 19:30	Armbruster 2	Report		Future Arena, Rio de Janeiro; Referees: Vilma Basinkaite (LTU), Daniel Voltan (BRA)

14 September 2016; 15:45	Turkey	15–5	Israel	Future Arena, Rio de Janeiro; Referees: Dawna Christy (CAN), Raquel Aguado (ESP)
14 September 2016; 15:45	Altunoluk 7 Özcan 4 Mercan 3 Ben-David 1 (o.g.)	Report	Ben-David 5	Future Arena, Rio de Janeiro; Referees: Dawna Christy (CAN), Raquel Aguado (ESP)

=== Semi-finals ===
15 September 2016; 15:00	Brazil	3–4	China	Future Arena, Rio de Janeiro; Referees: Dawna Christy (CAN), Alexander Knecht (GER)
15 September 2016; 15:00	Custodio 2 Amorim 1	Report	Chen 3 Zhang W. 1	Future Arena, Rio de Janeiro; Referees: Dawna Christy (CAN), Alexander Knecht (GER)

15 September 2016; 20:00	Turkey	11–1	United States	Future Arena, Rio de Janeiro; Referees: Vilma Basinkaite (LTU), Nejc Jakic (SLO)
15 September 2016; 20:00	Altunoluk 8 Yıldız 2 Özcan 1	Report	Miller 1	Future Arena, Rio de Janeiro; Referees: Vilma Basinkaite (LTU), Nejc Jakic (SLO)

=== Bronze medal match ===
16 September 2016; 13:30	Brazil	2–3	United States	Future Arena, Rio de Janeiro; Referees: Dawna Christy (CAN), Raquel Aguado (ESP)
16 September 2016; 13:30	Custodio 1 Amorim 1	Report	Armbruster 3	Future Arena, Rio de Janeiro; Referees: Dawna Christy (CAN), Raquel Aguado (ESP)

=== Gold medal match ===
16 September 2016; 18:30	China	1–4	Turkey	Future Arena, Rio de Janeiro; Referees: Vilma Basinkaite (LTU), Raili Sipura (FIN)
16 September 2016; 18:30	Chen 1	Report	Altunoluk 3 Yıldız 1	Future Arena, Rio de Janeiro; Referees: Vilma Basinkaite (LTU), Raili Sipura (FIN)

== Final rankings ==
Rank	Team
Gold medal	Turkey
Silver medal	China
Bronze medal	United States
4.	Brazil
5.	Japan
6.	Canada
7.	Israel
8.	Ukraine
9.	Australia
10.	Algeria

2016 women's Paralympic champions

Turkey
First title

Source: Paralympic.org

== See also ==
- Goalball at the 2016 Summer Paralympics – Men's tournament
