= Goalball at the 2016 Summer Paralympics =

Goalball at the XV Paralympic Games
- Venue: Future Arena
- Dates: 8–16 September 2016
- Competitors: 120 from 14 nations

Medalists
1st place, gold medalist(s)		Lithuania (men); Turkey (women)
2nd place, silver medalist(s)		United States (men); China (women)
3rd place, bronze medalist(s)		Brazil (men); United States (women)

Goalball was an event contested at the 2016 Summer Paralympics in Rio de Janeiro, Brazil.

== Medallists ==
Event	Gold	Silver	Bronze
Men's goalball	Lithuania (LTU); Nerijus Montvydas; Justas Pažarauskas; Mantas Brazauskis; Mantas Panovas; Genrik Pavliukianec; Mindaugas Suchovejus	United States (USA); Andy Jenks; Tyler Merren; Daryl Walker; John Kusku; Joseph Hamilton; Matt Simpson	Brazil (BRA); José Roberto Oliveira; Alex de Melo; Alexsander Celente; Leomon Moreno; Jose Márcio Sousa; Romário Marques
Women's goalball	Turkey (TUR); Neşe Mercan; Seda Yıldız; Sevda Altınoluk; Gülşah Düzgün; Buket Atalay; Sümeyye Özcan	China (CHN); Chen Fengqing; Ju Zhen; Zhang Wei; Zhao Kaimei; Zhang Huiwen; Sun Le	United States (USA); Jen Armbruster; Lisa Czechowski; Asya Miller; Amanda Dennis; Eliana Mason; Marybai Huking

== Qualifying ==
10 men's and 10 women's teams qualified for the Games.

=== Men ===
Means of qualification	Date	Venue	Berths	Qualified
Host nation	2 October 2009	(Denmark) Copenhagen	1	Brazil (BRA)
2014 IBSA Goalball World Championships	30 June – 5 July 2014	(Finland) Espoo	2	Finland (FIN); United States (USA)
2015 IBSA World Games	10–17 May 2015	(South Korea) Seoul	3	Lithuania (LTU); Sweden (SWE); Germany (GER)
2015 European Championships	2–11 July 2015	(Lithuania) Kaunas	1	Turkey (TUR)
2015 Parapan American Games	7–15 August 2015	(Canada) Toronto	1	Canada (CAN)
2015 Asian/Pacific Championships	5–13 November 2015	(China) Hangzhou	1	China (CHN)
2016 African Championships	29 February – 4 March 2016	(Algeria) Algiers	1	Algeria (ALG)
Total			10	

=== Women ===
Means of qualification	Date	Venue	Berths	Qualified
Host nation	2 October 2009	(Denmark) Copenhagen	1	Brazil (BRA)
2014 IBSA Goalball World Championships	30 June–5 July 2014	(Finland) Espoo	2	United States (USA); Turkey (TUR)
2015 IBSA World Games	10–17 May 2015	(South Korea) Seoul	3	Israel (ISR); China (CHN); Australia (AUS)
2015 European Championships	2–11 July 2015	(Lithuania) Kaunas	1	Ukraine (UKR)
2015 Parapan American Games	7–15 August 2015	(Canada) Toronto	1	Canada (CAN)
2015 Asian/Pacific Championships	5–13 November 2015	(China) Hangzhou	1	Japan (JPN)
2016 African Championships	29 February – 4 March 2016	(Algeria) Algiers	1	Algeria (ALG)
Total			10	

== Men's tournament ==
=== Competition format ===
The ten men's teams were divided into two equal groups for a single round robin group stage. The top four teams of each group advanced to the quarter finals. All matches in the second stage were knock-out format.

=== Group stage ===
==== Group A ====
Pos	Team	Pld	W	D	L	GF	GA	GD	Pts	Qualification
1	Brazil (H)	4	4	0	0	42	15	+27	12	Quarter-finals
2	Sweden	4	3	0	1	33	23	+10	9	Quarter-finals
3	Germany	4	1	0	3	24	26	−2	3	Quarter-finals
4	Canada	4	1	0	3	26	39	−13	3	Quarter-finals
5	Algeria	4	1	0	3	25	47	−22	3	

Source: Paralympic.org
(H) Hosts

==== Group B ====
Pos	Team	Pld	W	D	L	GF	GA	GD	Pts	Qualification
1	Lithuania	4	4	0	0	35	22	+13	12	Quarter-finals
2	United States	4	2	0	2	21	18	+3	6	Quarter-finals
3	Turkey	4	2	0	2	20	23	−3	6	Quarter-finals
4	China	4	1	0	3	25	28	−3	3	Quarter-finals
5	Finland	4	1	0	3	24	34	−10	3	

Source: Paralympic.org

=== Knock-out round ===
Quarter-finals
14 September
Brazil	10
China	3
14 September
United States	7
Germany	6
14 September
Lithuania	5
Canada	4
14 September
Sweden	5
Turkey	1

Semi-finals
15 September
Brazil	1
United States	10
15 September
Lithuania	7
Sweden	2

Gold medal
16 September
United States	8
Lithuania	14
Bronze medal
16 September
Brazil (a.e.t.)	6
Sweden	5

== Women's tournament ==
=== Competition format ===
The ten women's teams were divided into two equal groups for a single round robin group stage. The top four teams of each group advanced to the quarter finals. All matches in the second stage were knock-out format.

The Algerian women's team did not show up in time for its matches against the United States or Israel. The team missed connecting flights in Rome after setting out from a training camp in Poland. There were suspicions of a boycott. The International Paralympic Committee's spokesman, Craig Spence, said: "They are still sticking to their story that they suffered the worst transport issues known to man. Whether we believe it is a question mark and we are looking into it." Their first two games were recorded as 10–0 walkover wins for the other team. The team of Algeria arrived in Rio on 11 September. Spence remarked: "Fingers crossed they can manage to travel from the (Athletes') Village to the goalball venue in less than six days."

=== Group stage ===
==== Group C ====
Pos	Team	Pld	W	D	L	GF	GA	GD	Pts	Qualification
1	Brazil (H)	4	3	0	1	25	7	+18	9	Quarter-finals
2	United States	4	3	0	1	25	13	+12	9	Quarter-finals
3	Japan	4	2	1	1	13	8	+5	7	Quarter-finals
4	Israel	4	1	1	2	16	15	+1	4	Quarter-finals
5	Algeria	4	0	0	4	1	37	−36	0	

Source: Paralympic.org
(H) Hosts

==== Group D ====
Pos	Team	Pld	W	D	L	GF	GA	GD	Pts	Qualification
1	Turkey	4	4	0	0	37	11	+26	12	Quarter-finals
2	China	4	3	0	1	21	14	+7	9	Quarter-finals
3	Canada	4	2	0	2	16	22	−6	6	Quarter-finals
4	Ukraine	4	0	1	3	9	17	−8	1	Quarter-finals
5	Australia	4	0	1	3	6	25	−19	1	

Source: Paralympic.org

=== Knock-out round ===
Quarter-finals
14 September
Brazil	10
Ukraine	0
14 September
China	5
Japan	3
14 September
Turkey	15
Israel	5
14 September
United States	2
Canada	0

Semi-finals
15 September
Brazil	3
China	4
15 September
Turkey	11
United States	1

Gold medal
16 September
China	1
Turkey	4
Bronze medal
16 September
Brazil	2
United States	3
