= Sun Le =

Sun Le may refer to:

- Sun Le (footballer) (born 1989), Chinese football goalkeeper
- Sun Le (goalball) (born 1993), Chinese goalball player
