= Gülşah Düzgün =

Turkish goalball player

Personal information
- Born: Gülşah Aktürk; 25 September 1995 (age 30)

Sport
- Sport: Goalball
- Club: Kahramanmaraş Ertuğrul Gazi Disabled SK
Medal record
Goalball
Representing Turkey
Paralympics
Gold medal – first place	2016 Rio de Janeiro	Team
IBSA World Championships
Silver medal – second place	2018 Malmö	Team
Bronze medal – third place	2014 Espoo	Team
IBSA European Championships
Gold medal – first place	2019 Rostock	Team
Gold medal – first place	2015 Kaunas	Team
Silver medal – second place	2013 Konya	Team
Gold medal – first place	2012 Ascoli Piceno	Team Div. B

Gülşah Düzgün (born Gülşah Aktürk on 25 September 1995) is a Turkish female Paralympian goalball player. She is a member of the national team.

== Private life ==
Gülşah Düzgün was born to İsmail Aktürk and his spouse Mğrvet on 25 September 1995. She completed her secondary education in a school for the blinds and visually impaired.

She is married to her club mate Tekin Okan Düzgün, also a visually impaired sportsman and a national goalball player. In 2018, she gave birth to a daughter, Elif Bera.

== Sporting career ==
The visually impaired girl started performing goalball in the school through her physical training teacher in 2006. She played in the beginning in the school team, and later in a club. In 2007 at age 12, she was admitted to the national team, and was coached by Alşi Tekçe. She debuted internationally at a tournament in Germany in 2009.

Düzgün competes for Kahramanmaraş Ertuğrul Gazi Disabled SK in Kahramanmaraş.

She enjoyed the champion title with the national team at the 2015 IBSA Goalball European Championships Division A in Kaunas, Lithuania, which was a qualifier competition for the 2016 Paralympics.

Düzgün was a member of the women's national goalball team at the 2016 Paralympics in Rio de Janeiro, Brazil. She won the gold medal with her teammates at the Paralympics.

== Honours ==
=== International ===
- (gold) 2012 IBSA European Goalball Championships B in Ascoli Piceno, Italy
- (silver) 2013 IBSA Goalball European Championships Div. A in Konya, Turkey.
- (bronze) Malmö Lady- and Men InterVup 2014, Sweden.
- (bronze) 2014 IBSA Goalball World Championships in Espoo, Finland
- (gold) 2015 IBSA Goalball European Championships Div. A in Kaunas, Lithuania.
- (gold) 2016 Summer Paralympics in Rio de Janeiro, Brazil.
- (silver) 2018 IB>SA World Goalball Championships in Malmö, Sweden
- (gold) 2019 IBSA Goalball European Championship in Rostock, Germany
