= Yarden Adika =

Israeli Paralympic goalball player

Personal information
- Native name: ירדן אדיקה
- Born: 1999 (age 26–27)

Sport
- Country: Israel
- Sport: Goalball
Medal record
Event / 1st / 2nd / 3rd; IBSA World Games / 1 / 0 / 0
Women's goalball
Representing Israel
IBSA World Games
Gold medal – first place	2015 Seoul	Women's goalball

Yarden Adika (Hebrew: ירדן אדיקה; born 1999) is an Israeli Paralympic goalball player. She competed for Israel at the 2016 Rio Paralympics in the women's goalball tournament.

== Early life ==
Adika was born in Karmiel, and studied at the local high school majoring in communications.

She completed Sherut Leumi and was among the President of Israel's excelling volunteers for 2019.

== Goalball career ==
She was a member of the youth movement of the Jewish Institute for the Blind, and through it joined the Israel women's national goalball team.

Adika was a member of the national team from 2013 to 2016, when she retired due to a wrist injury. In 2015 she was part of the team's win at the IBSA World Games in Seoul, which guaranteed their spot at the 2016 Summer Paralympics.
