= Buket Atalay =

Turkish Paralympic goalball player

Personal information
- Born: 14 August 1990 (age 35)

Sport
- Sport: Goalball
- Club: Kahramanmaraş Gençlik Gücü SK
Medal record
Goalball
Representing Turkey
Paralympics
Gold medal – first place	2016 Rio de Janeiro	Team
IBSA World Championships
Bronze medal – third place	2014 Espoo	Team
IBSA European Championships
Gold medal – first place	2015 Kaunas	Team
Silver medal – second place	2013 Konya	Team
Gold medal – first place	2012 Ascoli Piceno	Team Div. B

Buket Atalay (born 14 August 1990) is a Turkish female Paralympian goalball player. She is a member of the national team.

== Sporting career ==
Atalay competes for Kahramanmaraş Gençlik Gücü SK in Kahramanmaraş.

She enjoyed the champion title with the national team at the 2015 IBSA Goalball European Championships Division A in Kaunas, Lithuania, which was a qualifier competition for the 2016 Paralympics.

She was a member of the women's national goalball team at the 2016 Paralympics in Rio de Janeiro, Brazil. She won the gold medal with her teammates at the Paralympics.

== Honours ==
=== International ===
- (gold) 2012 IBSA European Goalball Championships B in Ascoli Piceno, Italy
- (silver) 2013 IBSA Goalball European Championships in Konya, Turkey..
- (bronze) Malmö Lady- and Men InterVup 2014, Sweden.
- (bronze) 2014 IBSA Goalball World Championships in Espoo, Finland
- (gold) 2015 IBSA Goalball European Championships Div. A in Kauna, Lithuania.
- (gold) 2016 Summer Paralympics in Rio de Janeiro, Brazil.
