= Eliana Mason =

American goalball player

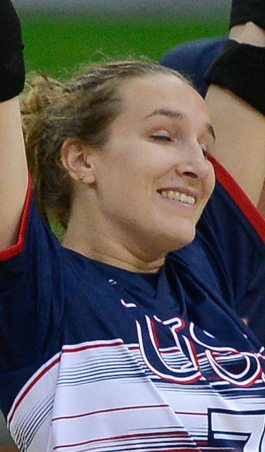
- Mason at the 2016 Summer Paralympics

Personal information
- Full name: Eliana Marie Mason
- Born: September 1, 1995 (age 30) Beaverton, Oregon, U.S.
- Height: 5 ft 6 in (168 cm)
- Weight: 150 lb (68 kg)
- Relative: Ella Halikas (cousin)

Sport
- Country: United States
- Sport: Goalball
- Disability: Glaucoma
- Disability class: B2
Medal record
Women's goalball
Representing United States
Paralympic Games
Bronze medal – third place	2016 Rio de Janeiro	Team
World Championships
Gold medal – first place	2014	Team
Parapan American Games
Silver medal – second place	2015 Toronto	Team
Silver medal – second place	2019 Lima	Team
Silver medal – second place	2023 Santiago	Team

Eliana Marie Mason (born September 1, 1995) is an American goalball player who competes in international-level events.

== Early life ==
Born on September 1, 1995 to Kevin and Joanna Mason. She is Greek American and is a cousin of model and social media influencer Ella Halikas. Eliana had underdeveloped eyes alongside glaucoma and cataracts, underwent surgery to remove her lenses which rendered her with only very limited vision in her right eye. Eliana tried a variety of sports, including cheerleading, track, gymnastics, and soccer before she discovered she could excel in goalball without having to worry about her vision loss.

== Career ==
At the age of fourteen, Eliana was introduced to goalball at the Washington State School for the Blind. While at Portland State University, she started practices with U.S. Women's National Goalball Team players Jen Armbruster and Asya Miller.
