= Neşe Mercan =

Turkish Paralympic goalball player

Personal information
- Born: 19 September 1994 (age 31) İskenderun, Hatay Province, Turkey

Sport
- Sport: Goalball
Medal record
Goalball
Representing Turkey
Paralympics
| Gold medal – first place | 2016 Rio de Janeiro | Team |
World Championships
| Silver medal – second place | 2018 Malmö | Team |
European Championship
| Gold medal – first place | 2019 Rostock | Team |
| Silver medal – second place | 2017 Nastola | Team |
| Gold medal – first place | 2015 Kaunas | team |
| Silver medal – second place | 2013 Konya | Team |
| Gold medal – first place | 2012 Ascoli Piceno | Team Div. B |
Tournaments
| Gold medal – first place | 2019 Japan | Team |

Neşe Mercan (born 19 September 1994) is a Turkish female Paralympian goalball player. She is a member of the national team.

== Early years ==
Neşe Mercan was born in İskenderun of Hatay Province, Turkey on 19 September 1994.

== Sporting career ==
Mercan was a member of the women's national goalball team at the 2016 Paralympics in Rio de Janeiro, Brazil. She won the gold medal with her teammates at the Paralympics.

In 2018, she enjoyed her national team's silver medal win at the Goalball World Championships in Malmö, Sweden.

She was part of the national team, which became champion at the 2019 IBSA Goalball European Championship held in Rostock, Germany. Her team became undefeated champion at the 2019 Elite Teams International Women Goalball Tournament in Japan.

== Honours ==
=== International ===
- (gold) 2012 IBSA European Goalball Championships B in Ascoli Piceno, Italy
- (silver) 2013 IBSA Goalball European Championship in Konya, Turkey
- (gold) 2015 IBSA Goalball European Championship in Kaunas, Lithuania
- (gold) 2016 Summer Paralympics in Rio de Janeiro, Brazil.
- (silver) 2017 IBSA Goalball European Champişonship in Nastola, Finland
- (silver) 2018 Goalball World Championships in Malmö, Sweden,
- (gold) 2019 IBSA Goalball European Champişonship in Rostock, Germany,
- (gold) 2019 Elite Teams International Women Goalball Tournament in Japan,
