= Ana Carolina Duarte Ruas Custódio =

Personal information
- Born: 23 April 1987 (age 39) Rio de Janeiro, Brazil

Sport
- Sport: Goalball
Medal record
Representing Brazil
Parapan American Games
Gold medal – first place	2015 Toronto	Women
Gold medal – first place	2019 Lima	Women
Silver medal – second place	2011 Guadalajara	Women
Bronze medal – third place	2023 Santiago	Women

Ana Carolina Duarte Ruas Custódio (born 23 April 1987) is a Brazilian goalball player who competes in international goalball competitions. She has represented Brazil at five Paralympic Games and has won four medals at the Parapan American Games including two gold medals.

Duarte lost her eyesight aged twelve when she was diagnosed with a brain tumour.
