= Goalball at the 2019 Parapan American Games =

- Venue: Villa Deportiva Regional del Callao Miguel Grau Coliseum
- Dates: 25–31 August 2019

Goalball at the 2019 Parapan American Games were held in Villa Deportiva Regional del Callao Miguel Grau Coliseum, Lima from August 25–31, 2019. There were 2 gold medals in this sport.

== Medal summary ==
=== Medal table ===
Rank	Nation	Gold	Silver	Bronze	Total
1	Brazil (BRA)	2	0	0	2
2	United States (USA)	0	2	0	2
3	Canada (CAN)	0	0	2	2
Totals (3 entries)		2	2	2	6

=== Medalists ===
Event	Gold	Silver	Bronze
Men's team	Brazil (BRA); José Roberto Oliveira; Alex Sousa; Leomon Moreno; Josemarcio Sousa; Romário Marques; Emerson da Silva	United States (USA); Daryl Walker; Tyler Merren; Joshua Welborn; John Kusku; Calahan Young; Matt Simpson	Canada (CAN); Ahmad Zeividavi; Aron Ghebreyohanes; Bruno Haché; Blair Nesbitt; Douglas Ripley; Peter Parsons
Women's team	Brazil (BRA); Simone Rocha; Jéssica Vitorino; Ana Carolina Duarte; Gleyse Henrique; Ana Gabriely Assunção; Victória Nascimento	United States (USA); Alexandra Lawson; Lisa Czechowski; Amanda Dennis; Eliana Mason; Shavon Lockhardt; Marybai Huking	Canada (CAN); Maryam Salehizadeh; Whitney Bogart; Meghan Mahon; Emma Reinke; Amy Burk; Roby Hammad

== See also ==
- Goalball at the 2020 Summer Paralympics
