= Zhao Kaimei =

Chinese goalball player

Personal information
- Born: November 10, 1987 (age 38) Yunnan, China
- Height: 163 cm (5 ft 4 in)
- Weight: 62 kg (137 lb)

Sport
- Sport: Women's goalball
- Disability class: B2
Medal record
Representing China
Paralympic Games
Silver medal – second place	2016 Rio de Janeiro	Team
Asian Para Games
Gold medal – first place	2014 Incheon	Team

Zhao Kaimei
- Traditional Chinese: 趙開美
- Simplified Chinese: 赵开美
Transcriptions
Standard Mandarin
- Hanyu Pinyin: Zhào Kāiměi

Zhao Kaimei (Chinese: 赵开美, born 10 November 1987) is a Chinese goalball player. She won a silver medal at the 2016 Summer Paralympics.

She started playing goalball in 2005.
