= Sümeyye Özcan =

Turkish female paralympic athlete

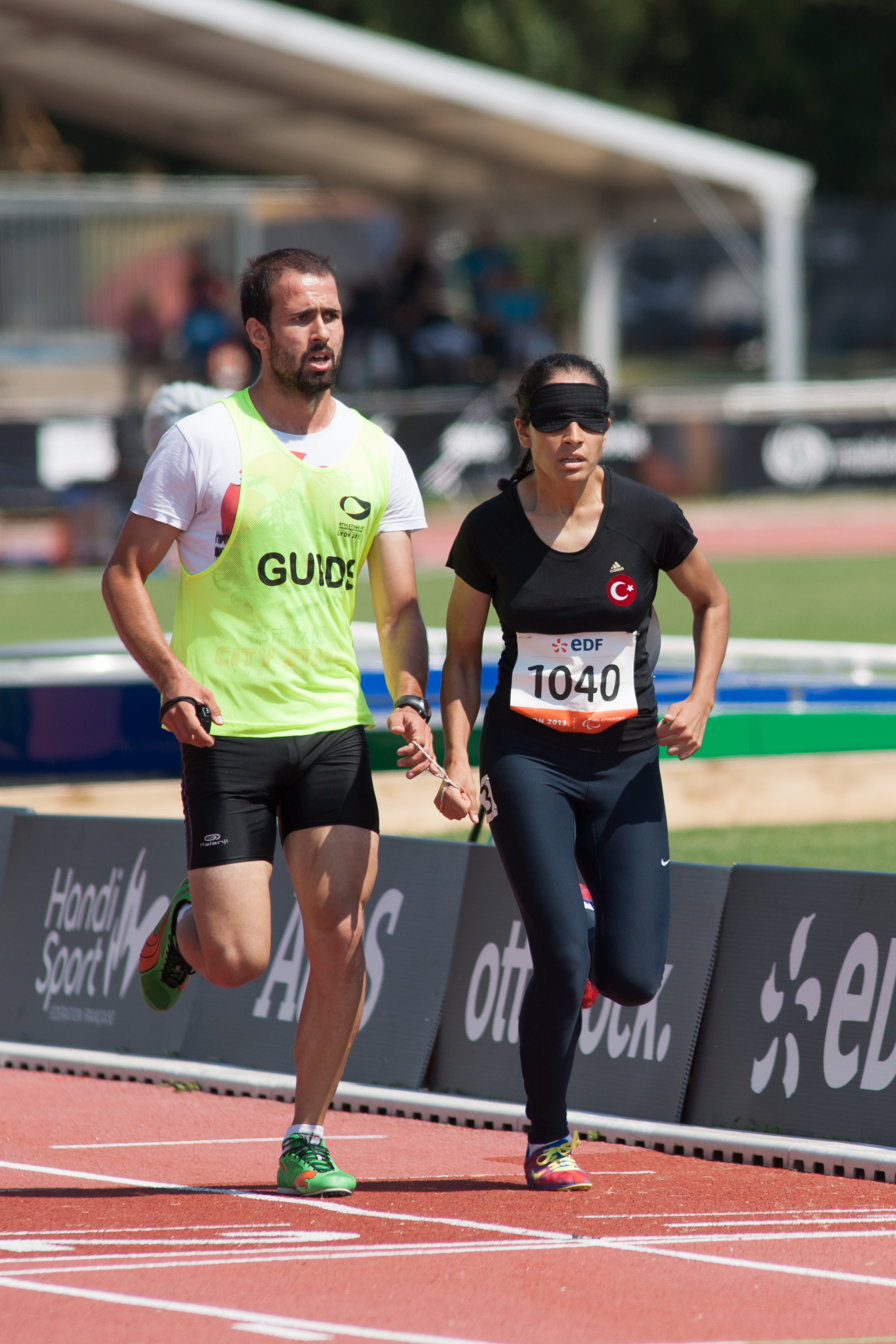
- Sümeyye Özcan running with guide in the 1500m event at the 2013 IPC Athletics World Championships in Lyon, France.

Personal information
- Born: 15 January 1992 (age 34) Malatya, Turkey

Sport
- Sport: Goalball, para-athletics
- Disability class: B1
- Club: Kahramanmaraş Ertuğrul Gazi Disabled SK
Medal record
Women's goalball
Representing Turkey
Paralympic Games
Gold medal – first place	2016 Rio de Janeiro	Team
IBSA World Championships
Bronze medal – third place	2014 Espoo	Team
IBSA European Championships
Gold medal – first place	2015 Kaunas	Team
Gold medal – first place	2012 Ascoli Piceno	Team Div. B

Sümeyye Özcan (born 15 January 1992) is a Turkish female middle distance runner and goalball player in the B1 class. She is a member of the national team.

== Early years ==
Sümeyye Özcan was born totally blind in Malatya, Turkey on 15 January 1992. Her elder sister as well as her younger sibling is also blind. Because there was no proper facilities for schooling blind children in Malatya, the family moved to Kahramanmaraş in 2001. She completed her education with the Ertuğrul Gazi School for the Blind and Visually Impaired in Kahramanmaraş.

== Sporting career ==
Özcan began with goal playing in 2004, and with athletics in 2009. She competes in the 800m, 1500m and shot put events. She is a member of both the national goalball team and national para-athletics team.

She competed for her school's team in Kahramanmaraş, and took part at the European Championships in 2009 and 2010 after internationally debuting in 2007. She represented her country at the 2011 and 2013 World Championships.

Para-athletics

Özcan took part in the shotput F12 event at the 2011 IPC Athletics World Championships held in Christchurch, New Zealand.

She competed in the 1500m T11 class event and the 2012 Summer Paralympics in London, United Kingdom. She ran with guide a personal best time of 5:10.68, and placed seventh.

In 2013, she participated in the 1500m T12 class event at the IPC Athletics World Championships held in Lyon, France.

Goalball

Özcan competes for Kahramanmaraş Ertuğrul Gazi Disabled SK in Kahramanmaraş.

She played for the national team at the Malmö Ladies' and Men's InterCup tournaments in Sweden in 2014 and 2015 respectively. The team placed third in 2014 and second in 2015. In 2015, she became top scorer of the tournament with 23 goals.

She enjoyed the champion title with the national team at the 2015 IBSA Goalball European Championships Division A in Kaunas, Lithuania, which was a qualifier competition for the 2016 Paralympics.

Özcan was also a member of the women's national Goalball team at the 2016 Paralympics in Rio de Janeiro, Brazil. Özcan won the gold medal with her teammates at the event.

== Honours ==
=== Individual ===
- Top scorer - Malmö Ladies' and Men's InterCup 2015 (23 goals).

=== International ===
- (gold) 2012 IBSA European Goalball Championships B in Ascoli Piceno, Italy
- (bronze) Malmö Ladies' and Men's InterCup 2014, Sweden.
- (bronze) 2014 IBSA Goalball World Championships in Espoo, Finland
- (gold) 2015 IBSA Goalball European Championships Div. A in Kaunas, Lithuania.
- (silver) Malmö Ladies' and Men's InterCup 2015, Sweden.
- (gold) 2016 Summer Paralympics in Rio de Janeiro, Brazil.
