= Sun Le (goalball) =

Chinese goalball player

Personal information
- Born: August 17, 1993 (age 32) Qinhuangdao, Hebei, China
- Education: Beijing Union University
- Height: 174 cm (5 ft 9 in)
- Weight: 82 kg (181 lb)

Sport
- Sport: Women's goalball
- Disability class: B1
Medal record
Representing China
Paralympic Games
Silver medal – second place	2016 Rio de Janeiro	Team

Sun Le
- Traditional Chinese: 孫樂
- Simplified Chinese: 孙乐
Transcriptions
Standard Mandarin
- Hanyu Pinyin: Sūn Lè

Sun Le (Chinese: 孙乐, born 17 August 1993) is a Chinese goalball player. She won a silver medal at the 2016 Summer Paralympics.

Before she played goalball in 2012, Sun Le competed in shot putting.
