= Zhang Huiwen (goalball) =

Chinese goalball player

Personal information
- Born: June 12, 1993 (age 33) Beijing, China
- Education: Beijing Union University
- Height: 172 cm (5 ft 8 in)
- Weight: 64 kg (141 lb)

Sport
- Sport: Women's goalball
- Disability class: B1
Medal record
Representing China
Paralympic Games
Silver medal – second place	2016 Rio de Janeiro	Team
Asian Para Games
Gold medal – first place	2014 Incheon	Team

Zhang Huiwen
- Traditional Chinese: 張惠雯
- Simplified Chinese: 张惠雯
Transcriptions
Standard Mandarin
- Hanyu Pinyin: Zhāng Huìwén

Zhang Huiwen (Chinese: 张惠雯, born 12 June 1993) is a Chinese goalball player. She won a silver medal at the 2016 Summer Paralympics.

Zhang lost her vision following a brain injury at age 5. She began playing goalball in 2009 at age 16.
