= Marybai Huking =

American goalball player

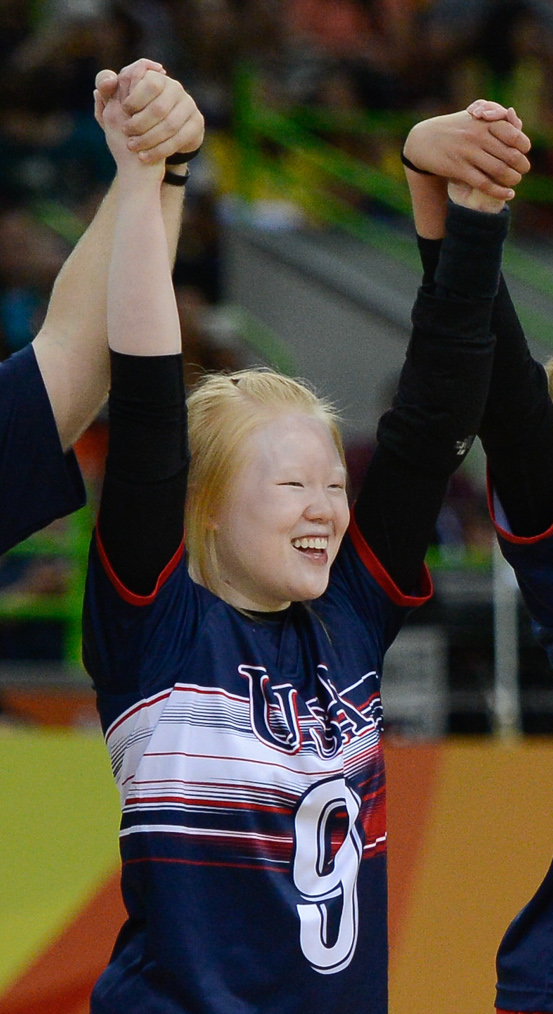
- Huking at the 2016 Summer Paralympics

Personal information
- Born: November 11, 1996 (age 29) Yingtan, Jiangxi, China
- Home town: Salt Lake City, Utah, U.S.
- Education: Portland State University; University of Utah
- Height: 5 ft 1 in (1.55 m)
- Weight: 123 lb (56 kg)

Sport
- Country: United States
- Sport: Goalball
- Disability class: B2
Medal record
Women's goalball
Representing United States
Paralympic Games
Bronze medal – third place	2016 Rio de Janeiro	Team
World Championships
Gold medal – first place	2014 Espoo	Team
Parapan American Games
Silver medal – second place	2015 Toronto	Team
Silver medal – second place	2019 Lima	Team

Marybai Huking (born November 11, 1996) is an American goalball player who won a bronze medal at the 2016 Summer Paralympics. She was adopted from China when she was two years old, and raised in Salt Lake City.

== Early life ==
Born on November 11, 1996 with albinism and classified as legally blind.

== Career ==
In 2010, Utah Foundation for the Blind and Visually Impaired introduced Marybai to goalball.

At the 2020 Summer Games, she made 101 blocks in 72 minutes of her duration of playing. She is also a two-time Paralympic medalist, winning bronze in Rio and silver in Tokyo.
