= Zhang Wei (goalball) =

Chinese goalball player

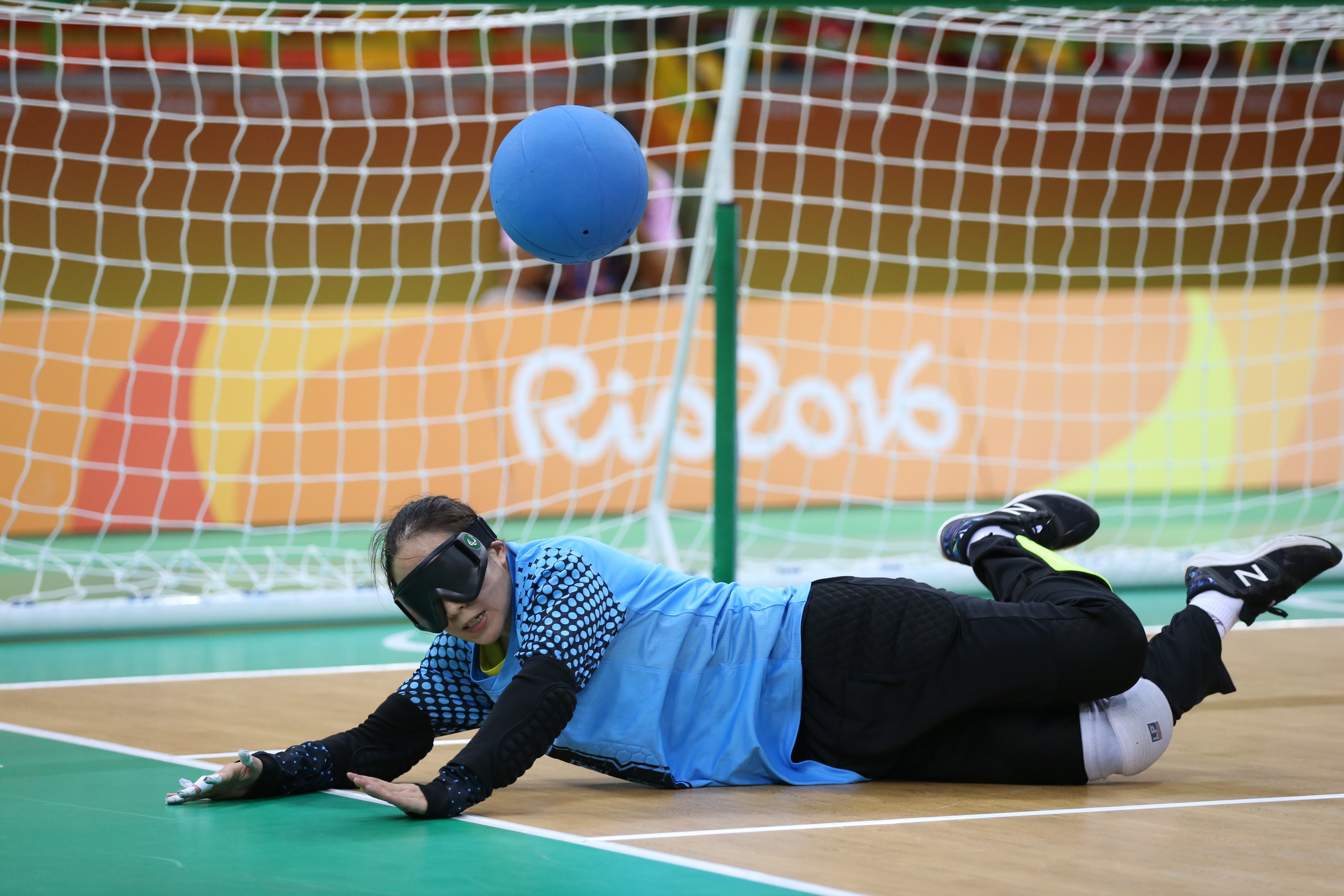
- Zhang at the 2016 Summer Paralympics

Personal information
- Born: December 22, 1989 (age 36) Jingjiang, Jiangsu, China
- Education: Nanjing University of Chinese Medicine
- Height: 170 cm (5 ft 7 in)
- Weight: 66 kg (146 lb)

Sport
- Sport: Women's goalball
- Disability class: B1
Medal record
Representing China
Paralympic Games
Silver medal – second place	2016 Rio de Janeiro	Team
Asian Para Games
Gold medal – first place	2010 Guangzhou	Team
Gold medal – first place	2014 Incheon	Team
Silver medal – second place	2018 Jakarta	Team

Zhang Wei
- Traditional Chinese: 張魏
- Simplified Chinese: 张魏
Transcriptions
Standard Mandarin
- Hanyu Pinyin: Zhāng Wèi

Zhang Wei (Chinese: 张魏, born 22 December 1989) is a Chinese goalball player. She won a silver medal at the 2016 Summer Paralympics.

At age 6, she experienced loss of vision and was diagnosed with optic neuropathy. She began playing goalball in 2008, after participating in track and field for a few years. She discontinued running because she could not find a permanent sighted guide. She missed the 2012 Summer Paralympics due to a rotator cuff tear.
