= Future Arena =

Sports venue in Rio de Janeiro, Brazil

Coordinates: 22.9805°S 43.3922°W

- Arena do Futuro
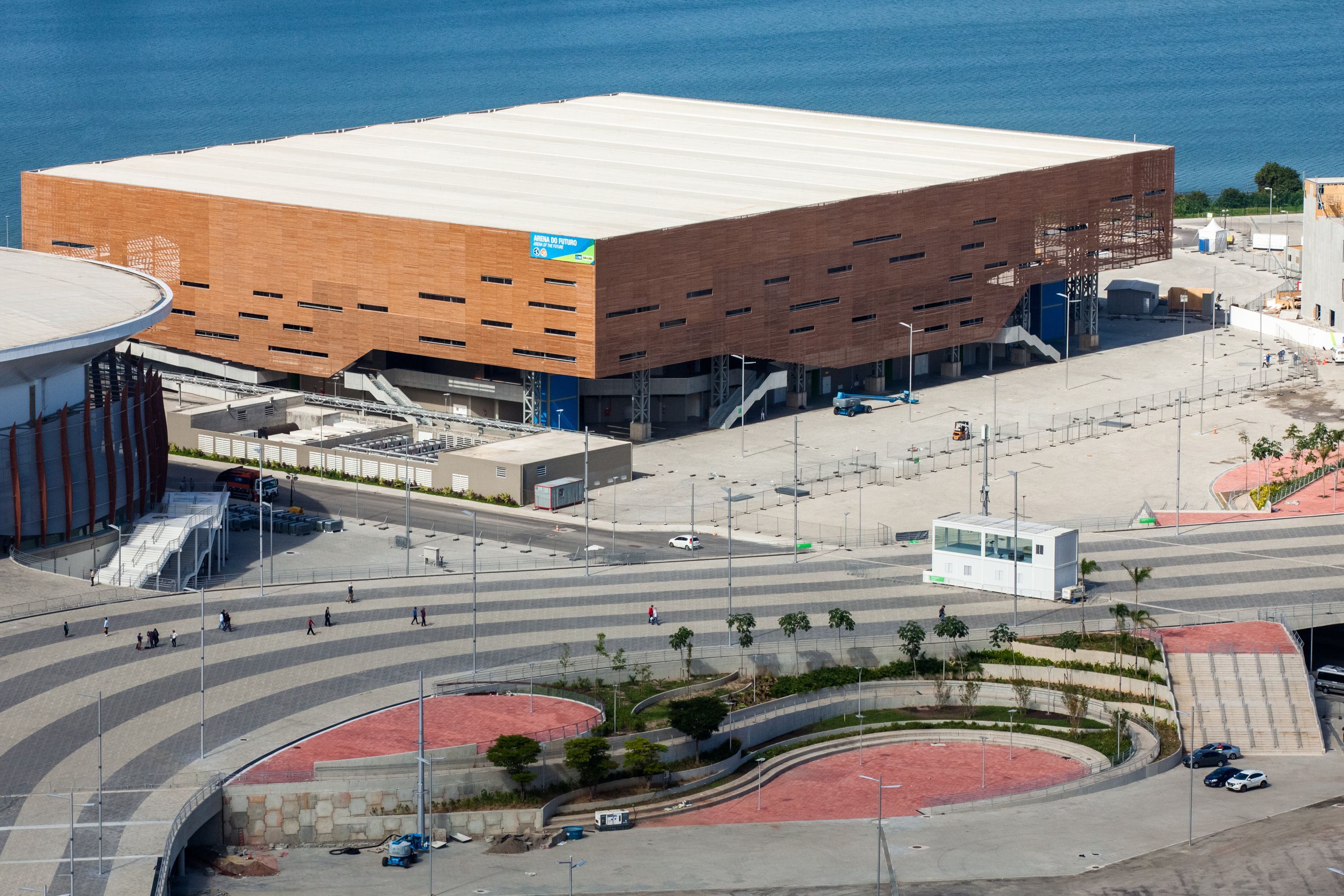
- Interactive map of Future Arena
- Location: Barra Olympic Park; Barra da Tijuca, Rio de Janeiro, Brazil
- Owner: City of Rio de Janeiro
- Capacity: 12,000 (Olympics)

Construction
- Opened: 2016

The Future Arena (Portuguese: Arena do Futuro) was a temporary sporting venue in Barra da Tijuca, Rio de Janeiro, Brazil, that was used for handball at the 2016 Summer Olympics, and goalball at the 2016 Summer Paralympics.

After the games, the venue was planned to be dismantled and reassembled as four schools. As of August 2017, these plans had been abandoned by Rio's mayor Marcelo Crivella, but were reinstated sometime after.

In 2022, demolition of the arena started. The first of the two reassembled schools opened in February 2024, with the other two opening in March, all in a lesser developed part in the west of Rio de Janeiro. All four schools would teach STEAM fields, as part of a model introduced by the Municipal Chamber of Rio de Janeiro.
