= Jen Armbruster =

American Paralympic goalball player

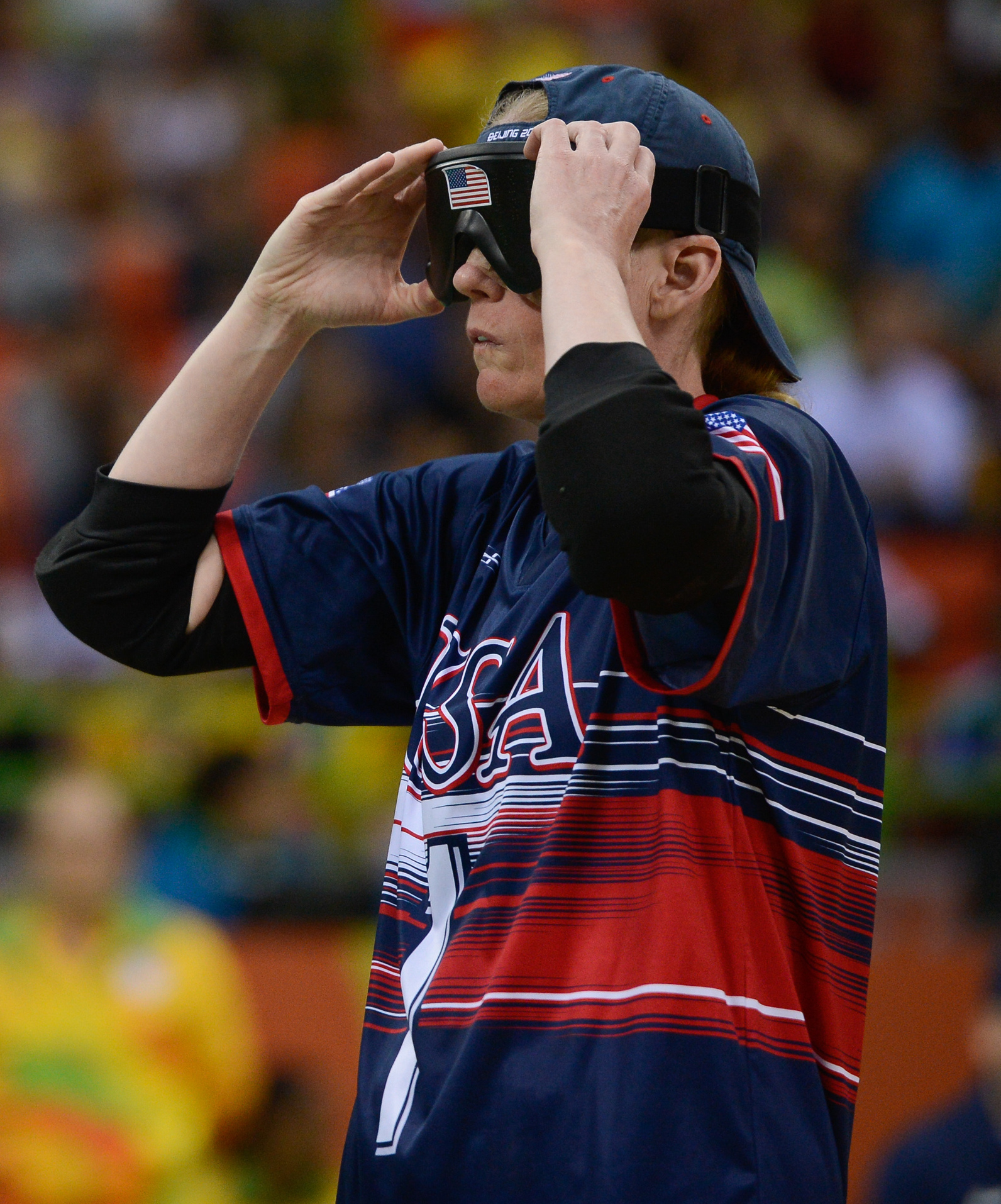
- Armbruster at the 2016 Summer Paralympics

Personal information
- Full name: Jennifer Armbruster
- Nationality: American
- Born: February 12, 1975 (age 51) Taipei, Taiwan
- Home town: Portland, Oregon, U.S.
- Education: University of Northern Colorado (BA); Sam Houston State University (MA)
- Height: 5 ft 8 in (173 cm)

Sport
- Country: United States
- Sport: Goalball
- Disability class: B1
Medal record
Women's goalball
Representing United States
Paralympic Games
Gold medal – first place	2008 Beijing	Team
Silver medal – second place	2004 Athens	Team
Bronze medal – third place	1996 Atlanta	Team
Bronze medal – third place	2016 Rio de Janeiro	Team
Parapan American Games
Gold medal – first place	2011 Guadalajara	Team
Silver medal – second place	2015 Toronto	Team

Jennifer Armbruster (born February 12, 1975 in Taipei) is an American goalball player.

== Early life ==
Born to Ken Armbruster whom served as Head Coach for the U.S. Women's Goalball Team from 1996 to 2016. Armbruster began losing her vision at 14, but continued to play in her school's basketball team, but her vision loss progressed to the point of being legally blind. She later lost her vision completely and therefore did not join the military like her father. Instead she found success in goalball and played at the 1992 Summer Paralympics and several Paralympic Games since. She has won a gold medal.

== Career ==
Armbruster was introduced to paralympic in 1990. In 1992, she competed in her first Paralympic Games. In 1996, she was part of the Team USA at the Atlanta where the team earned bronze.

At the 2008 Beijing Paralympic Games, she helped the team to win silver medal after which she was elected flag bearer by all of the U.S. Paralympic team.

== Personal life ==
She was married to teammate Asya Miller. Her current wife is Jackie Bower, whom she shares a son and 3 other children with.

== See also ==
- United States women's national goalball team
- 2012 Summer Paralympics roster
- 2016 Summer Paralympics roster
