= Lisa Banta =

American goalball player and athlete

Lisa Czechowski
Personal information
- Born: Lisa Banta; May 29, 1979 (age 47) Pequannock, New Jersey, U.S.
- Home town: Boonton, New Jersey, U.S.
- Height: 5 ft 5 in (165 cm)
- Spouse: Jacob Czechowski

Sport
- Country: United States
- Sport: Goalball
- Disability class: B2
Medal record
Representing United States
Women's para athletics
Paralympic Games
Silver medal – second place	2000 Sydney	Discus F12
Women's goalball
Paralympic Games
Gold medal – first place	2008 Beijing	Team
Silver medal – second place	2020 Tokyo	Team
Silver medal – second place	2004 Athens	Team
Bronze medal – third place	2016 Rio de Janeiro	Team
Parapan American Games
Gold medal – first place	2011 Guadalajara	Team
Silver medal – second place	2015 Toronto	Team
Silver medal – second place	2019 Lima	Team
Silver medal – second place	2023 Santiago	Team

Lisa Czechowski (née Banta, born May 29, 1979, in New Jersey) is an American goalball player.

Her Paralympic debut won her a silver medal for discus at the 2000 Sydney Paralympic Games; she also competed in goalball at those games. In December 2001 she took part in the torch relay for the 2002 Winter Olympics in Salt Lake City.

Czechowski and teammate Asya Miller competed in their sixth Paralympics together at the 2020 Tokyo Paralympic Games. Together they have won four Paralympic medals, including gold at the 2008 Beijing Paralympic Games.

== Early life ==
Born with nystagmus to the family of David and Barbara Banta, and diagnosed with cone dystrophy while in middle school, both conditions affecting her vision. In high school, she tried various track and field events, eventually moving to shot put and discus. She first became involved with goalball in 1995.

== Career ==
Czechowski played Little League baseball until she was nine, the only blind competitor during her high school days. she won medals as a senior at the Northern Hills Conference and Morris County Championships.

In 2000, She won the NCAA Division III Middle Atlantic States Collegiate Athletic Conference spring discus title where she set a conference record of 126 feet, 7 inches.

== Personal life ==
She is married to Jacob Czechowski (USA women's coach) and has a son Jay Czechowski born July 2, 2014.

== See also ==
- United States women's national goalball team
- 2012 Summer Paralympics roster
- 2016 Summer Paralympics roster
- 2020 Summer Paralympics roster
