= Asya Miller =

American goalball player (born 1979)

Personal information
- Full name: Asya Miller Lapper
- Born: October 16, 1979 (age 46) Lapeer, Michigan, U.S.
- Home town: Portland, Oregon, U.S.
- Height: 5 ft 6 in (168 cm)

Sport
- Country: United States
- Sport: Goalball
- Disability class: B3
Medal record
Representing United States
Women's para athletics
Paralympic Games
Bronze medal – third place	2000 Sydney	Discus F13
Women's goalball
Paralympic Games
Gold medal – first place	2008 Beijing	Team
Silver medal – second place	2020 Tokyo	Team
Silver medal – second place	2004 Athens	Team
Bronze medal – third place	2016 Rio de Janeiro	Team
Parapan American Games
Gold medal – first place	2011 Guadalajara	Team
Silver medal – second place	2015 Toronto	Team
Silver medal – second place	2019 Lima	Team
Silver medal – second place	2023 Santiago	Team

Asya Miller Lapper (born October 16, 1979) is an American five-time Paralympic medalist, with four of her medals coming in goalball. Miller was nominated for an ESPY Award in 2009.

== Career ==
Miller made her Paralympic debut in 2000 and won a bronze medal for discus at the Sydney Paralympic Games. In goalball, Miller and teammate Lisa Czechowski competed in their sixth Paralympics together at the 2020 Tokyo Paralympic Games. Together they have won four Paralympic medals, including gold at the 2008 Beijing Paralympic Games.

Her visual impairment is caused by Stargardt disease. She has also competed in various throwing events, like discus, besides goalball. Her wife is fellow goalballer Jen Armbruster.

== See also ==
- United States women's national goalball team
- 2012 Summer Paralympics roster
- 2016 Summer Paralympics roster
- 2020 Summer Paralympics roster
