= Chen Fengqing =

Chinese goalball player

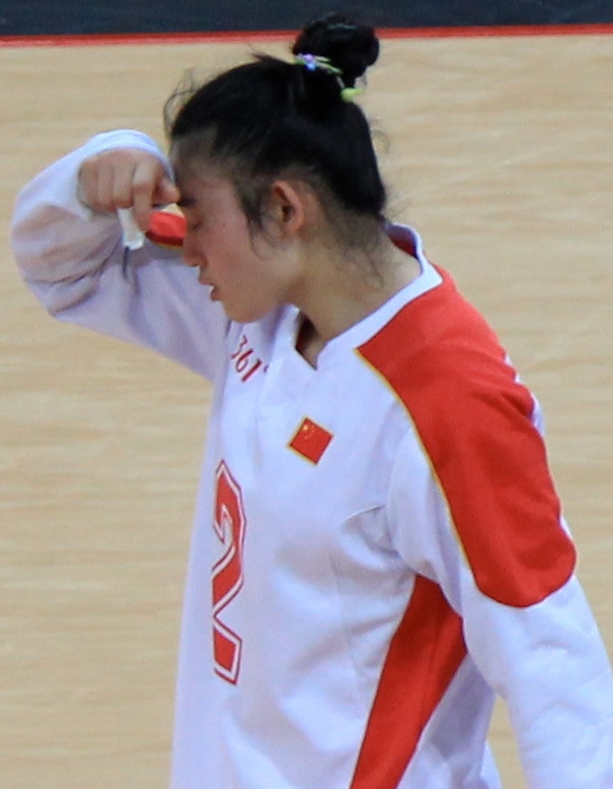
- Chen at the 2012 Summer Paralympics

Personal information
- Born: July 17, 1985 (age 40) Chengjiang, Yunnan, China
- Height: 163 cm (5 ft 4 in)
- Weight: 64 kg (141 lb)

Sport
- Sport: Women's goalball
- Disability class: B1 (formerly B2)
Medal record
Representing China
Paralympic Games
Silver medal – second place	2008 Beijing	Team
Silver medal – second place	2012 London	Team
Silver medal – second place	2016 Rio de Janeiro	Team
Asian Para Games
Gold medal – first place	2010 Guangzhou	Team
Silver medal – second place	2018 Jakarta	Team

Chen Fengqing
- Traditional Chinese: 陳鳳青
- Simplified Chinese: 陈凤青
Transcriptions
Standard Mandarin
- Hanyu Pinyin: Chén Fèngqīng

Chen Fengqing (Chinese: 陈凤青, born 17 July 1985) is a Chinese goalball player. She won a silver medal at each of the 2008, 2012, and 2016 Summer Paralympics.

Chen's visual impairment was congenital. Before she took on goalball in 2003, Chen was doing farm work in her hometown.
