= Amanda Dennis (goalball) =

American goalball player

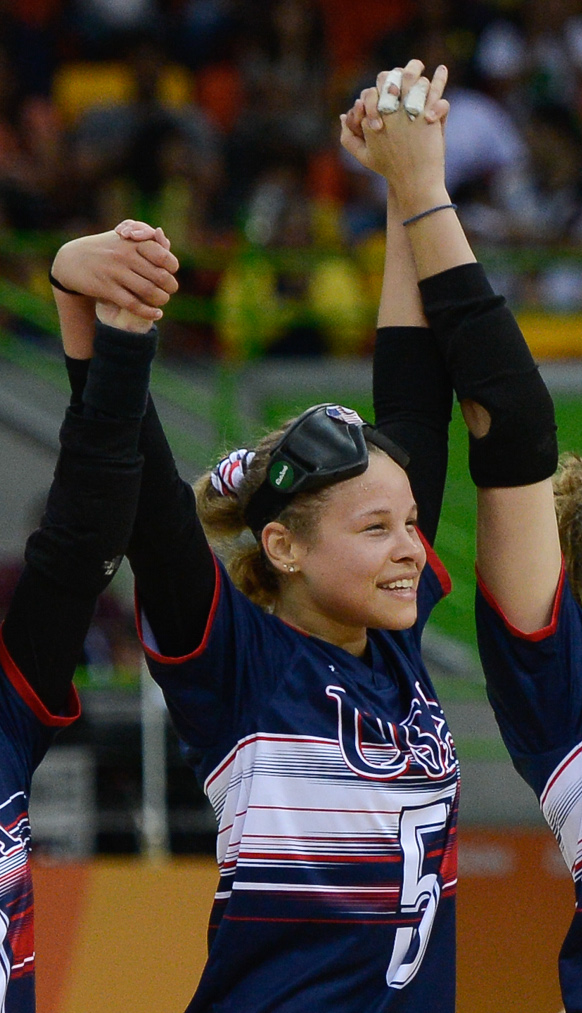
- Dennis at 2016 Summer Paralympics

Personal information
- Born: February 5, 1994 (age 32) Atlanta, Georgia, U.S.
- Home town: Peachtree City, Georgia, U.S.
- Height: 5 ft 6 in (168 cm)
- Weight: 135 lb (61 kg)

Sport
- Country: United States
- Sport: Goalball
- Disability: Aniridia, nystagmus
- Disability class: B3
Medal record
Women's goalball
Representing United States
Paralympic Games
Bronze medal – third place	2016 Rio de Janeiro	Team
Silver medal – second place	2020 Tokyo	Team
World Championships
Gold medal – first place	2014	Team
Parapan American Games
Gold medal – first place	2011 Guadalajara	Team
Silver medal – second place	2015 Toronto	Team
Silver medal – second place	2019 Lima	Team

Amanda Dennis (born February 5, 1994) is an American goalball player who competes in international-level events.
