= Goalball at the 2012 Summer Paralympics – Women's team rosters =

This article shows the rosters of all participating teams at the women's goalball tournament at the 2012 Summer Paralympics in London.

== Pool A ==
=== Brazil ===
The following is the Brazil roster in the women's goalball tournament of the 2012 Summer Paralympics.

No.	Player	Age
2	Neusimar Clemente dos Santos	31
3	Ana Carolina Duarte Ruas Custodio	25
4	Denise Daniele Batista de Souza	27
5	Márcia Bonfim Vieira dos Santos	32
7	Gleyse Priscila Portioli de Souza	29
9	Claudia Paula G de Amorim Oliveira	36

=== China ===
The following is the China roster in the women's goalball tournament of the 2012 Summer Paralympics.

No.	Player	Age
1	Wang Ruixue	25
2	Chen Fengqing	27
3	Lin Shan	26
4	Wang Shasha	26
5	Fan Feifei	23
6	Ju Zhen	23

=== Denmark ===
The following is the Denmark roster in the women's goalball tournament of the 2012 Summer Paralympics.

No.	Player	Age
1	Maria Larsen	29
2	Mette Præstegaard Nissen	25
4	Elisabeth Weichel	33
5	Kamilla Ryding	26
6	Karina Jørgensen	29

=== Finland ===
The following is the Finland roster in the women's goalball tournament of the 2012 Summer Paralympics.

No.	Player	Age
1	Maja Somerkivi	31
2	Krista Leppänen	28
4	Kaisu Hynninen	26
5	Iida Kauppila	19
6	Sanna Tynkkynen	35
7	Katja Heikkinen	35

=== Great Britain ===
The following is the Great Britain roster in the women's goalball tournament of the 2012 Summer Paralympics.

No.	Player	Age
1	Anna Sharkey	25
2	Amy Ottaway	19
3	Jessica Luke	25
4	Georgina Bullen	18
5	Louise Simpson	28

== Pool B ==
=== Australia ===
The following is the Australia roster in the women's goalball tournament of the 2012 Summer Paralympics.

No.	Player	Age
1	Jennifer Blow	21
2	Tyan Taylor	22
3	Nicole Esdaile	25
4	Rachel Henderson	20
6	Michelle Rzepecki	25
8	Meica Christensen	23

=== Canada ===
The following is the Canada roster in the women's goalball tournament of the 2012 Summer Paralympics.

No.	Player	Age
2	Cassie Orgeles	22
3	Whitney Bogart	26
4	Ashlie Andrews	19
6	Jill MacSween	20
7	Amy Kneebone	22
9	Nancy Morin	37

=== Japan ===
The following is the Japan roster in the women's goalball tournament of the 2012 Summer Paralympics.

No.	Player	Age
1	Masae Komiya	37
2	Rie Urata	35
5	Akane Nakashima	22
6	Eiko Kakehata	19
8	Haruka Wakasugi	17
9	Akiko Adachi	29

=== Sweden ===
The following is the Sweden roster in the women's goalball tournament of the 2012 Summer Paralympics.

No.	Player	Age
2	Viktoria Andersson	27
3	Sofia Naesström	33
4	Anna Dahlberg	32
5	Malin Gustavsson	41
6	Maria Wåglund	28
7	Josefine Jälmestål	34

=== United States ===
The following is the American roster in the women's goalball tournament of the 2012 Summer Paralympics.

No.	Player	Age
1	Jen Armbruster	37
2	Amanda Dennis	18
3	Lisa Czechowski	33
4	Asya Miller	33
5	Robin Theryoung	33
6	Jordan Walters	23

== See also ==
- Goalball at the 2012 Summer Paralympics – Men's team rosters
