= Japan at the 2016 Summer Paralympics =

- IPC code: JPN
- NPC: Japan Paralympic Committee
- Website: www.jsad.or.jp (in Japanese)

in Rio de Janeiro
- Competitors: 132 in 22 sports
- Medals Ranked 64th: Gold 0 Silver 10 Bronze 14 Total 24

Summer Paralympics appearances (overview)
- 1964; 1968; 1972; 1976; 1980; 1984; 1988; 1992; 1996; 2000; 2004; 2008; 2012; 2016; 2020; 2024

Japan competed at the 2016 Summer Paralympics in Rio de Janeiro, Brazil, from 7 September to 18 September 2016. The country qualified athletes in cycling, goalball, judo, sailing, and wheelchair basketball.

While the first-ever (and only) failure to score Gold in Summer Paralympics was disappointing, resulting in a 64th rank, the number of total medals ranked 17th. Despite this, Tokyo will be the host city of the 2020 Summer Paralympics, a Japanese segment was performed during the closing ceremony.

== Support ==
In September 2015, a representative from the country attended the Rio 2016 Paralympic Games Chef de Mission seminar as part of the country's preparation efforts for the 2016 Games.

== Disability classifications ==
Every participant at the Paralympics has their disability grouped into one of five disability categories; amputation, the condition may be congenital or sustained through injury or illness; cerebral palsy; wheelchair athletes, there is often overlap between this and other categories; visual impairment, including blindness; Les autres, any physical disability that does not fall strictly under one of the other categories, for example dwarfism or multiple sclerosis. Each Paralympic sport then has its own classifications, dependent upon the specific physical demands of competition. Events are given a code, made of numbers and letters, describing the type of event and classification of the athletes competing. Some sports, such as athletics, divide athletes by both the category and severity of their disabilities, other sports, for example swimming, group competitors from different categories together, the only separation being based on the severity of the disability.

== Medallists ==
Medal	Name	Sport	Event	Date
Silver	Makoto Hirose	Judo	Men's 60 kg	8 September
Silver	Misato Michishita	Athletics	Women's marathon - T12	18 September
Bronze	Satoshi Fujimoto	Judo	Men's 66 kg	8 September
Bronze	Takuya Sugawa	Swimming	Men's 100 metre backstroke S14	8 September
Bronze	Takuro Yamada	Swimming	Men's 50 metre freestyle S9	13 September

== Cycling ==
With one pathway for qualification being one highest ranked NPCs on the UCI Para-Cycling male and female Nations Ranking Lists on 31 December 2014, Japan qualified for the 2016 Summer Paralympics in Rio, assuming they continued to meet all other eligibility requirements.

== Equestrian ==
Through the Para Equestrian Individual Ranking List Allocation method, the country earned a pair of slots at the Rio Games for their two highest ranked equestrian competitors. These slots were irrespective of class ranking.

== Goalball ==
The Japan women's national goalball team qualified for the Rio Games after finishing first at the 2015 IBSA Goalball Asian-Pacific Championships. Japan's women enter the tournament ranked 3rd in the world.

The following is the Japan roster in the women's goalball tournament of the 2016 Summer Paralympics.

No.	Player	Class	Date of birth (age)
1	Haruka Wakasugi	B1	23 August 1995 (aged 21)
2	Eiko Kakehata	B3	19 February 1993 (aged 23)
5	Rie Urata	B1	1 July 1977 (aged 39)
6	Akiko Adachi	B2	10 September 1983 (aged 32)
7	Yuki Temma	B1	26 July 1990 (aged 26)
9	Masae Komiya	B1	8 May 1975 (aged 41)

Pos	Team	Pld	W	D	L	GF	GA	GD	Pts	Qualification
1	Brazil (H)	4	3	0	1	25	7	+18	9	Quarter-finals
2	United States	4	3	0	1	25	13	+12	9	Quarter-finals
3	Japan	4	2	1	1	13	8	+5	7	Quarter-finals
4	Israel	4	1	1	2	16	15	+1	4	Quarter-finals
5	Algeria	4	0	0	4	1	37	−36	0	

Source: Paralympic.org
(H) Hosts

8 September 2016; 14:30	Japan	1–1	Israel	Future Arena, Rio de Janeiro; Referees: Alexander Knecht (GER), Vilma Basinkaite (LTU)
8 September 2016; 14:30	Wakasugi 1	Report	Mahamid 1	Future Arena, Rio de Janeiro; Referees: Alexander Knecht (GER), Vilma Basinkaite (LTU)

9 September 2016; 18:45	Brazil	1–2	Japan	Future Arena, Rio de Janeiro; Referees: Raili Sipura (FIN), Joelle Boulet (CAN)
9 September 2016; 18:45	Amorim 1	Report	Adachi 2	Future Arena, Rio de Janeiro; Referees: Raili Sipura (FIN), Joelle Boulet (CAN)

11 September 2016; 10:45	United States	5–3	Japan	Future Arena, Rio de Janeiro; Referees: Nejc Jakic (SLO), Raquel Aguado (ESP)
11 September 2016; 10:45	Armbruster 2 Miller 2 Dennis 1	Report	Temma 1 Adachi 1 Komiya 1	Future Arena, Rio de Janeiro; Referees: Nejc Jakic (SLO), Raquel Aguado (ESP)

12 September 2016; 15:30	Japan	7–1	Algeria	Future Arena, Rio de Janeiro; Referees: Nejc Jakic (SLO), Rudi Janssen (BEL)
12 September 2016; 15:30	Temma 3 Kakehata 2 Adachi 2	Report	Benallou 1	Future Arena, Rio de Janeiro; Referees: Nejc Jakic (SLO), Rudi Janssen (BEL)

14 September 2016; 14:15	China	5–3	Japan	Future Arena, Rio de Janeiro; Referees: Joelle Boulet (CAN), Nejc Jakic (SLO)
14 September 2016; 14:15	Zhang W. 2 Chen 1 Zhang H. 1 Ju 1	Report	Kakehata 1 Adachi 1 Komiya 1	Future Arena, Rio de Janeiro; Referees: Joelle Boulet (CAN), Nejc Jakic (SLO)

== Judo ==
In total judoka representing Japan won one silver medal and three bronze medals.

== Sailing ==
One pathway for qualifying for Rio involved having a boat have top seven finish at the 2015 Combined World Championships in a medal event where the country had nor already qualified through via the 2014 IFDS Sailing World Championships. Japan qualified for the 2016 Games under this criterion in the Sonar event with a sixteenth-place finish overall and the seventh country who had not qualified via the 2014 Championships. The boat was crewed by Shin'ya Yamamoto (sailor), Junichi Ohnuma and Koji Ishii.

== Shooting ==
The first opportunity to qualify for shooting at the Rio Games took place at the 2014 IPC Shooting World Championships in Suhl. Shooters earned spots for their NPC. Japan earned a qualifying spot at this event in the R5 – 10m Air Rifle Mixed Prone SH2 event as a result of the performance Akiko Sega. It was the only qualification spot Japan earned at the event.

== Swimming ==
The top two finishers in each Rio medal event at the 2015 IPC Swimming World Championships earned a qualifying spot for their country for Rio. Yasuhiro Tanaka earned Japan a spot after winning silver in the Men's 100m Breaststroke SB14.

== Wheelchair basketball ==
The Japan men's national wheelchair basketball team has qualified for the 2016 Rio Paralympics.

Pos	Team	Pld	W	L	PF	PA	PD	Pts	Qualification
1	Spain	5	4	1	341	265	+76	9 (Note: Head-to-head record: Spain 3 pts, +8 PD; Turkey 3 pts, +1 PD; Japan 3 pts, −9 PD)	Quarter-finals
2	Turkey	5	4	1	327	272	+55	9	Quarter-finals
3	Australia	5	4	1	342	293	+49	9	Quarter-finals
4	Netherlands	5	2	3	264	294	−30	7	Quarter-finals
5	Japan	5	1	4	278	300	−22	6	9th/10th place playoff
6	Canada	5	0	5	222	350	−128	5	11th/12th place playoff

Source: Paralympic.org
Rules for classification: 1) Points; 2) Head-to-head results; 3) Points difference; 4) Points scored.
Notes:

8 September 2016
15:45

Report

Turkey	65–49	Japan
Scoring by quarter: 18–16, 13–9, 16–16, 18–8
Pts: Gürbulak 25; Rebs: Gümüş 11; Asts: Gürbulak 10		Pts: Fujimoto 22; Rebs: Fujimoto 8 Asts: Kozai 10

Carioca Arena 1, Rio de Janeiro
Referees: Cristian Roja

9 September 2016
15:45

Report

Japan	39–55	Spain
Scoring by quarter: 11–8, 12–18, 4–16, 12–13
Pts: Kozai 11; Rebs: Fujimoto, Chiwaki 11; Asts: Kozai 8		Pts: Mouriz 20; Rebs: A. Zarzuela 10; Asts: Alejos 4

Carioca Arena 1, Rio de Janeiro
Referees: Bill Kuerzi

10 September 2016
21:00

Report

Netherlands	67–39	Japan
Scoring by quarter: 22–10, 14–23, 16–16, 15–10
Pts: Korkmaz 33; Rebs: Poggenwisch, Bellers 6 Asts: Poggenwisch 8		Pts: Fujimoto 25; Rebs: Fujimoto 11; Asts: Kozai 11

Rio Olympic Arena, Rio de Janeiro
Referees: Jaime Oseguera

11 September 2016
21:00

Report

Japan	76–45	Canada
Scoring by quarter: 13–9, 22–15, 19–14, 22–7
Pts: Kozai 19; Rebs: Chiwaki 8 Asts: Kozai 7		Pts: Eng 18; Rebs: Goncin 7 Asts: Goncin 6

Rio Olympic Arena, Rio de Janeiro
Referees: Max Kindervater

12 September 2016
13:30

Report

Australia	68–55	Japan
Scoring by quarter: 14–7, 20–13, 15–10, 19–25
Pts: Ness 12; Rebs: Knowles 7 Asts: Knowles 9		Pts: Kozai 9 Rebs: Fujimoto 6 Asts: Mayajima 7

Carioca Arena 1, Rio de Janeiro
Referees: Bil Kuerzi

== Wheelchair rugby ==
Japan entered the tournament ranked number three in the world.

Preliminary round

Pos	Team	Pld	W	D	L	GF	GA	GD	Pts	Qualification
1	United States	3	3	0	0	165	142	+23	6	Semi-finals
2	Japan	3	2	0	1	163	155	+8	4	Semi-finals
3	Sweden	3	1	0	2	145	151	−6	2	Fifth place Match
4	France	3	0	0	3	141	166	−25	0	Seventh place Match

Source: Rio2016
14 September 2016
16:00

Japan	50–46	Sweden
	Report

Carioca Arena 1, Rio de Janeiro
Referee: Mitch Carr, Darren Roberts

15 September 2016
16:00

Japan	57–52	France
	Report

Carioca Arena 1, Rio de Janeiro
Referee: Brian Ward, Pierre-Alexandre Briere

16 September 2016
16:00

United States	57–56	Japan
	Report

Carioca Arena 1, Rio de Janeiro
Referee: Pierre-Alexandre Briere, Lukasz Symczak

Semifinals

17 September 2016
16:00

Australia	63–57	Japan
	Report

Carioca Arena 1, Rio de Janeiro
Referee: Jean Choiniere, Mitch Carr

Bronze Medal Match

18 September 2016
09:00

(bronze) Japan	52–50	Canada
	Report

Carioca Arena 1, Rio de Janeiro
Referee: Darren Roberts, Liam Costello

== Wheelchair tennis ==
Shingo Kunieda represented Japan in wheelchair tennis. He would go to Rio as the defending 2008 and 2012 Paralympic gold medalist. Shingo Kunieda, Takuya Miki, Satoshi Saida, Takashi Sanada all qualified in the men's singles event via the standard qualification route. Japan qualified three players in the women's singles event. Kanako Domori, Yui Kamiji and Miho Nijo all qualified via the standard qualification route.

== See also ==
- Japan at the 2016 Summer Olympics
