= Japan women's national goalball team =

Japanese national team, for the Paralympic sport of goalball

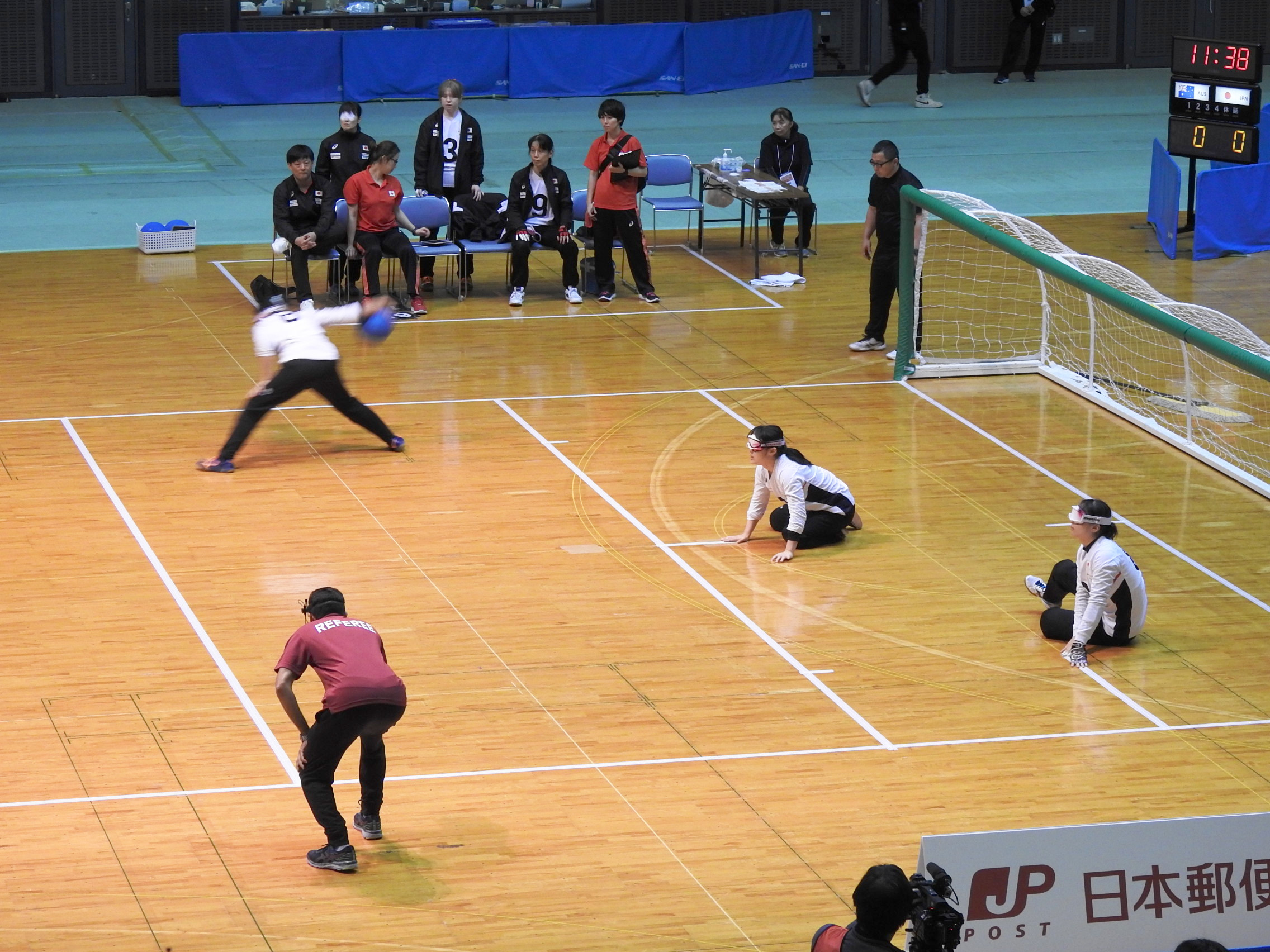
- Japan women's team throwing, regional championships, Chiba, Japan (2019).
- Sport: Goalball
- League: IBSA
- Division: Women
- Region: IBSA Asia
- Location: Japan
- Colours: Red, White, Black
- Championships: Paralympic Games medals: : 1: 0: 2 World Championship medals: : 0: 0: 0
- Parent group: Japan Goal Ball Association
- Website: www.jgba.jp

Japan women's national goalball team is the women's national team of Japan. Goalball is a team sport designed specifically for athletes with a vision impairment. Its women's team has internationally completed including at the IBSA World Goalball Championships and the Paralympic Games.

== Paralympic Games ==
=== 2004 Athens ===
At the 2004 Summer Paralympics in Athens, Greece, the team finished third.

=== 2008 Beijing ===
The team competed in 2008 Summer Paralympics, from 6 to 17 September 2008, in the Beijing Institute of Technology Gymnasium 'bat wing' arena, Beijing, China. The team ranked seventh of eight in the round-robin stage, ahead of Germany.

Athletes were Akiko Adachi, Mieko Kato, Masae Komiya, Yuki Naoi, Tomoe Takada, and Rie Urata.

=== 2012 London ===
The team beat Sweden in the semi-finals which went into sudden death extra-throws, then took gold in the 2012 Summer Paralympics in London, England with a victory over China. The Japanese women's goalball team included Masae Komiya, Rie Urata, and Akiko Adachi, led by coach Naoki Eguro. Haruka Wakasugi was the youngest player.

The following is the Japan roster in the women's goalball tournament of the 2012 Summer Paralympics.

No.	Player	Age
1	Masae Komiya	37
2	Rie Urata	35
5	Akane Nakashima	22
6	Eiko Kakehata	19
8	Haruka Wakasugi	17
9	Akiko Adachi	29

Group C

Team	Pld	W	D	L	GF	GA	GD	Pts	Qualification
Canada	4	3	0	1	6	3	+3	9	Quarterfinals
Japan	4	2	1	1	5	3	+2	7	Quarterfinals
Sweden	4	2	1	1	11	11	0	7	Quarterfinals
United States	4	2	0	2	9	4	+5	6	Quarterfinals
Australia	4	0	0	4	7	17	−10	0	Eliminated

Source: "London 2012 Paralympic Games - Goalball results" (PDF). Paralympic.org. 3 October 2012 – via Goalball.sport.

31 August 2012; 09:00	Australia	1 – 3	Japan	Copper Box, London; Referees: Hooshang Shariati (IRI), Yasser Omar (EGY)
31 August 2012; 09:00	Esdaile 1	Report	Adacho 2 Komiya 1	Copper Box, London; Referees: Hooshang Shariati (IRI), Yasser Omar (EGY)

1 September 2012; 15:00	Japan	2 – 1	United States	Copper Box, London

2 September 2012; 11:30	Sweden	0 – 0	Japan	Copper Box, London; Referees: Tony Collonny (USA), Christl Däntler (GER)
2 September 2012; 11:30		Report		Copper Box, London; Referees: Tony Collonny (USA), Christl Däntler (GER)

3 September 2012; 19:45	Japan	0 – 1	Canada	Copper Box, London

Quarter-final

5 September 2012; 10:30	Japan	2 – 0	Brazil	Copper Box, London
5 September 2012; 10:30		Report		Copper Box, London

Semi-final

6 September 2012; 15:00	Sweden	3 – 4 (a.e.t.)	Japan	Copper Box, London; Referees: Dina Murdie (GBR), Launel Scott (CAN)
6 September 2012; 15:00	Gustavsson 1 Jälmestål 1 Wåglund 1	Report	Komiya 2 Adachi 1 Urata 1	Copper Box, London; Referees: Dina Murdie (GBR), Launel Scott (CAN)

Final

7 September 2012; 15:00	China	0 – 1	Japan	Copper Box, London
7 September 2012; 15:00		Report	Adachi 1	Copper Box, London

=== 2016 Rio ===
Athletes for the 2016 Summer Paralympics in Rio de Janeiro, Brazil were Akiko Adachi, Eiko Kakehata, Masae Komiya, Yuki Tenma, Rie Urata, and Haruka Wakasugi, with escort Emi Kato, assistant coach Sayaka Sugiyama, and head coach Kyoichi Ichikawa.

Japan also lodged an unsuccessful protest with the International Blind Sports Federation regarding the late attendance of the Algeria team with a concern that they were disadvantaged compared to other teams.

The following is the Japan roster in the women's goalball tournament of the 2016 Summer Paralympics.

No.	Player	Class	Date of birth (age)
1	Haruka Wakasugi	B1	23 August 1995 (aged 21)
2	Eiko Kakehata	B3	19 February 1993 (aged 23)
5	Rie Urata	B1	1 July 1977 (aged 39)
6	Akiko Adachi	B2	10 September 1983 (aged 32)
7	Yuki Temma	B1	26 July 1990 (aged 26)
9	Masae Komiya	B1	8 May 1975 (aged 41)

Pos	Team	Pld	W	D	L	GF	GA	GD	Pts	Qualification
1	Brazil (H)	4	3	0	1	25	7	+18	9	Quarter-finals
2	United States	4	3	0	1	25	13	+12	9	Quarter-finals
3	Japan	4	2	1	1	13	8	+5	7	Quarter-finals
4	Israel	4	1	1	2	16	15	+1	4	Quarter-finals
5	Algeria	4	0	0	4	1	37	−36	0	

Source: Paralympic.org
(H) Hosts

8 September 2016; 14:30	Japan	1–1	Israel	Future Arena, Rio de Janeiro; Referees: Alexander Knecht (GER), Vilma Basinkaite (LTU)
8 September 2016; 14:30	Wakasugi 1	Report	Mahamid 1	Future Arena, Rio de Janeiro; Referees: Alexander Knecht (GER), Vilma Basinkaite (LTU)

9 September 2016; 18:45	Brazil	1–2	Japan	Future Arena, Rio de Janeiro; Referees: Raili Sipura (FIN), Joelle Boulet (CAN)
9 September 2016; 18:45	Amorim 1	Report	Adachi 2	Future Arena, Rio de Janeiro; Referees: Raili Sipura (FIN), Joelle Boulet (CAN)

11 September 2016; 10:45	United States	5–3	Japan	Future Arena, Rio de Janeiro; Referees: Nejc Jakic (SLO), Raquel Aguado (ESP)
11 September 2016; 10:45	Armbruster 2 Miller 2 Dennis 1	Report	Temma 1 Adachi 1 Komiya 1	Future Arena, Rio de Janeiro; Referees: Nejc Jakic (SLO), Raquel Aguado (ESP)

12 September 2016; 15:30	Japan	7–1	Algeria	Future Arena, Rio de Janeiro; Referees: Nejc Jakic (SLO), Rudi Janssen (BEL)
12 September 2016; 15:30	Temma 3 Kakehata 2 Adachi 2	Report	Benallou 1	Future Arena, Rio de Janeiro; Referees: Nejc Jakic (SLO), Rudi Janssen (BEL)

Quarter-final

14 September 2016; 14:15	China	5–3	Japan	Future Arena, Rio de Janeiro; Referees: Joelle Boulet (CAN), Nejc Jakic (SLO)
14 September 2016; 14:15	Zhang W. 2 Chen 1 Zhang H. 1 Ju 1	Report	Kakehata 1 Adachi 1 Komiya 1	Future Arena, Rio de Janeiro; Referees: Joelle Boulet (CAN), Nejc Jakic (SLO)

=== 2020 Tokyo ===
As the host nation, the team gets to compete in the 2020 Summer Paralympics, with competition from Wednesday 25 August to finals on Friday 3 September 2021, in the Makuhari Messe arena, Chiba, Tokyo, Japan.

Paralympian athletes (women's team): Norika Hagiwara (B3), Eiko Kakehata (B2), Rieko Takahashi (B1), Yuki Temma (B1), Rie Urata (B1), and Haruka Wakasugi (B1). The following is the Japan roster in the women's goalball tournament of the 2020 Summer Paralympics.

No.	Player	Class	Date of birth (age)
1	Yuki Temma	B1	26 July 1990 (aged 31)
2	Rie Urata	B1	1 July 1977 (aged 44)
3	Eiko Kakehata	B3	19 February 1993 (aged 28)
6	Norika Hagiwara	B2	2 February 2001 (aged 20)
7	Rieko Takahashi	B1	20 March 1998 (aged 23)
8	Haruka Wakasugi	B1	23 August 1995 (aged 26)

Pos	Team	Pld	W	D	L	GF	GA	GD	Pts	Qualification
1	Turkey	4	3	0	1	30	11	+19	9	Quarterfinals
2	United States	4	3	0	1	22	10	+12	9	Quarterfinals
3	Japan (H)	4	2	1	1	18	13	+5	7	Quarterfinals
4	Brazil	4	1	1	2	23	19	+4	4	Quarterfinals
5	Egypt	4	0	0	4	3	43	−40	0	

Source: TOCOG
Rules for classification: 1) points; 2) goal difference; 3) number of wins; 4) goals against; 5) head-to-head goal difference.
(H) Hosts

Round-robin

25 August 2021
14:45

Turkey	7–1	Japan
Sevd. Altunoluk 3', 11', 17', 21'; Güler 5', 20'; Yilmaz 21'	Report	Hagiwara 5'

Makuhari Messe, Tokyo
Referee: Svitlana Moroz (Ukraine), Raquel Aguado Gómez (Spain)

27 August 2021
10:30

Japan	4–4	Brazil
Temma 1'; Hagiwara 7', 10', 16'	Report	Custodio 14', 21'; Amorim 16', 21'

Makuhari Messe, Tokyo
Referee: Raquel Aguado Gómez (Spain), Svitlana Moroz (Ukraine)

28 August 2021
13:15

Japan	3–2	United States
Hagiwara 8', 11'; Wakasugi 17'	Report	Dennis 8', 19'

Makuhari Messe, Tokyo
Referee: Launel Scott (Canada), Woradet Kultawongwattana (Thailand)

29 August 2021
10:30

Egypt	0–10	Japan
	Report	Hagiwara 1', 1', 5', 6', 7', 8', 8'; Kakehata 1', 6', 7'

Makuhari Messe, Tokyo
Referee: Woradet Kultawongwattana (Thailand), Svitlana Moroz (Ukraine)

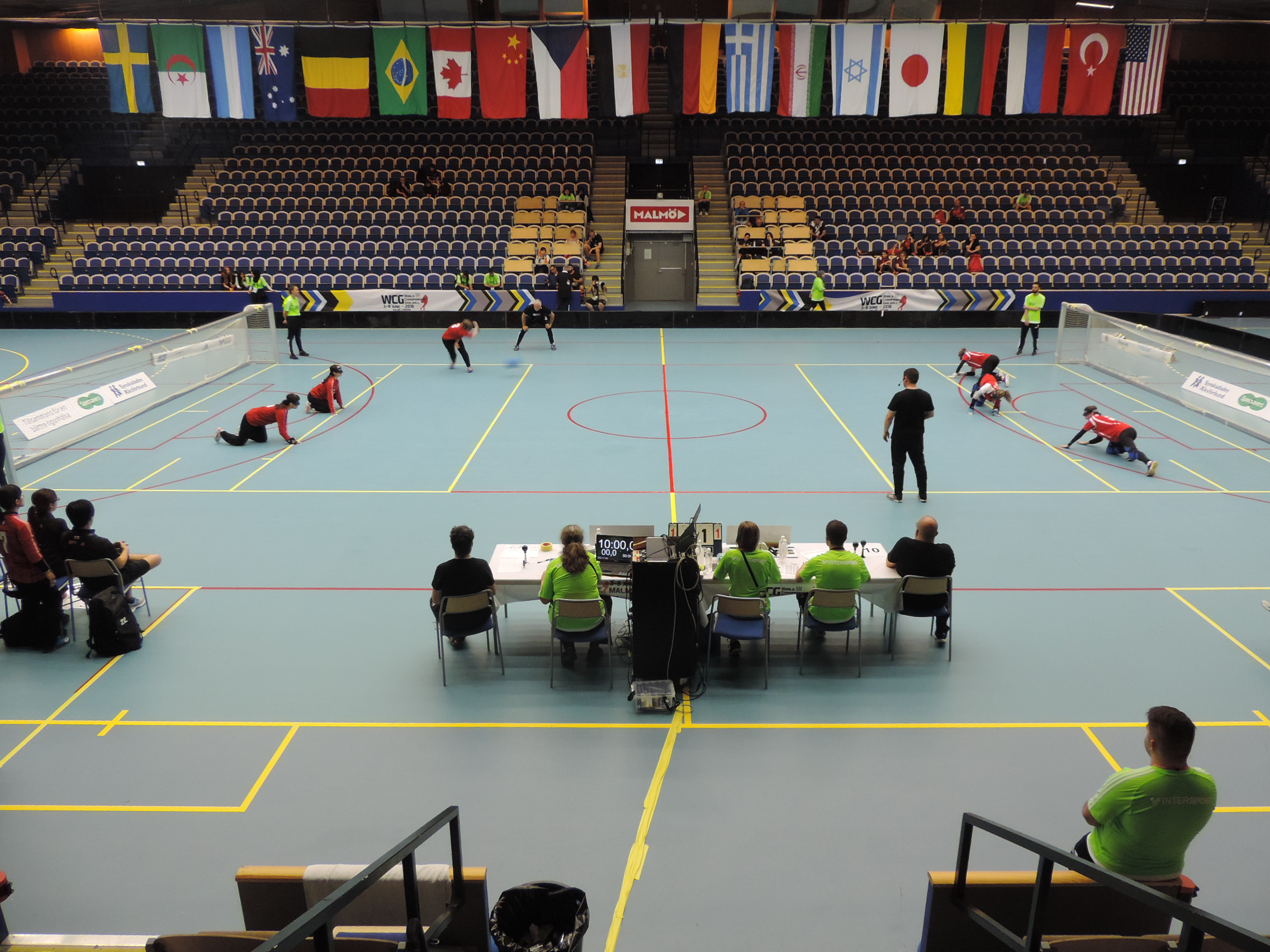
Japan vs Russia women goalball teams. World Goalball Championships, Malmö, Sweden (2018).

== World Championships ==
=== 2002 Rio de Janeiro ===
The 2002 IBSA World Goalball Championships were held in Rio de Janeiro, Brazil. The team was one of ten teams participating, and their first World Championships. They finished ninth overall.

=== 2014 Espoo ===
They improved their ranking in the 2014 Championships in Espoo, Finland, but losing to Turkey to get fourth place.

=== 2018 Malmö ===
The team competed in the 2018 World Championships from 3 to 8 June 2018, in Malmö, Sweden. They placed third in Pool C, losing to Canada in the quarter-finals, 2:3; and were fifth in the overall final standings.

=== 2022 Matosinhos ===
The team competed in the 2022 World Championships from 7 to 16 December 2022, at the Centro de Desportos e Congressos de Matosinhos, Portugal. There were sixteen men's and sixteen women's teams. They placed second in Pool B, and fifth in final standings.

== IBSA World Games ==
The 2003 IBSA World Games were held in Quebec City, Canada with 10 teams competing. The first stage was pool play with 5 teams per pool and the top two teams in each pool advancing to the next round. The team made it out of the round robin round. Japan finished third after winning the bronze medal game.

The 2007 IBSA World Championships and Games were held in Brazil. The women's goalball competition included thirteen teams, including this one. The competition was a 2008 Summer Paralympics qualifying event. Masae Komia was sixth in the competition in scoring with 17 points.

== Regional championships ==
The team competed in IBSA Asia goalball region, and from January 2010 became part of the IBSA Asia-Pacific goalball competition region.

=== 2013 Beijing ===
The team competed in the 2013 IBSA Asia Pacific Goalball Regional Championships, from 11 to 16 November 2013, in Beijing, China. Of the four women's teams (Australia, China, Iran, Japan), Japan lost to China in the finals to take silver, 3:0, that went into overtime and then extra throws.

=== 2015 Hangzhou ===
The team competed in the 2015 IBSA Asia Pacific Goalball Regional Championships, from 8 to 12 November 2015, in the China National Goalball Training Centre, Hangzhou, China. Of the four women's teams (Australia, China, Japan, Thailand), Japan took the gold medal from China, 1:0.

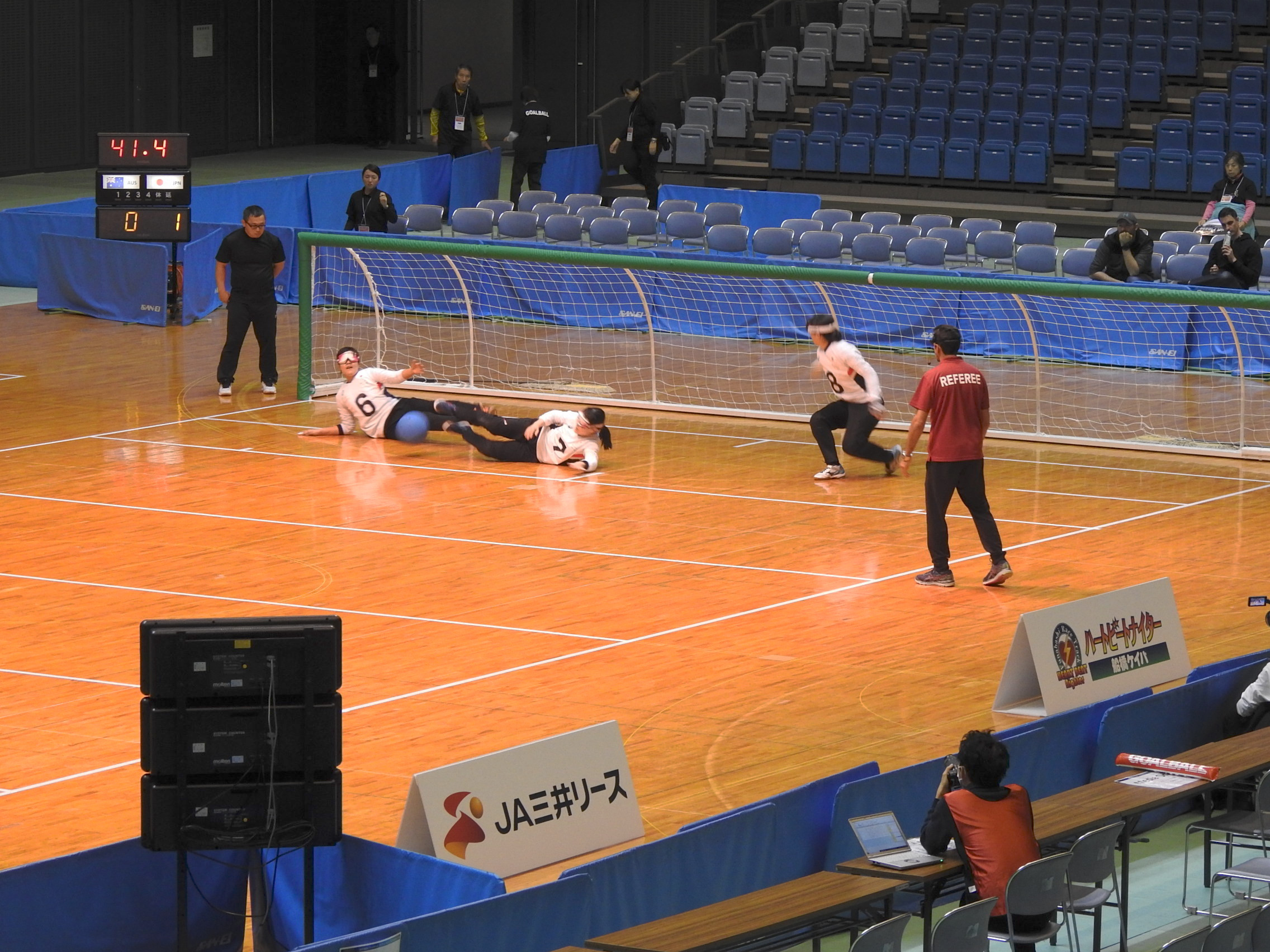
Japan women's team defending, Chiba, Japan (2019)

=== 2017 Bangkok ===
The team competed in the 2017 IBSA Asia/Pacific Goalball Regional Championships, from Monday 21 to Saturday 26 August 2017, in the Thai-Japan Sports Stadium, Din Daeng, Bangkok, Thailand. They won the gold medal against China, 6:2.

=== 2019 Chiba ===
The team competed in the 2019 IBSA Goalball Asia-Pacific Regional Championships, from Thursday 5 to Tuesday 10 December 2019, in the Chiba Port Arena, Chiba, Japan. They placed first overall of six teams.

== FESPIC Games ==
In 2006, the team participated in the 9th edition of the FESPIC Games held in Kuala Lumpur. They were one of three teams competing, the other two being Iran and China.

== Competitive history ==
The table below contains individual game results for the team in international matches and competitions.

Year	Event	Opponent	Date	Venue	Team	Team	Winner	Ref
2003	IBSA World Championships and Games	Turkey	7 August	Quebec City, Canada	10	0	Japan	
2003	IBSA World Championships and Games	Sweden	7 August	Quebec City, Canada	1	0	Japan	
2003	IBSA World Championships and Games	South Korea	7 August	Quebec City, Canada	0	3	Japan	
2003	IBSA World Championships and Games	Japan	7 August	Quebec City, Canada	6	6		
2003	IBSA World Championships and Games	Brazil	11 August	Quebec City, Canada	1	2	Brazil	
2003	IBSA World Championships and Games	Spain	11 August	Quebec City, Canada	0	3	Japan	
2006	FESPIC Games	China	25 November	Kuala Lumpur	5	2	China	
2006	FESPIC Games	Iran	26 November	Kuala Lumpur	2	6	Iran	
2006	FESPIC Games	China	27 November	Kuala Lumpur	1	1		
2006	FESPIC Games	Iran	28 November	Kuala Lumpur	3	3		
2007	IBSA World Championships and Games	South Korea	31 Jul	Brazil	11	1	Japan	
2007	IBSA World Championships and Games	Spain	1 August	Brazil	3	0	Japan	
2007	IBSA World Championships and Games	Ukraine	2 August	Brazil	4	2	Japan	
2007	IBSA World Championships and Games	Australia	3 August	Brazil	4	1	Japan	
2007	IBSA World Championships and Games	Brazil	4 August	Brazil	4	1	Brazil	
2007	IBSA World Championships and Games	Great Britain	5 August	Brazil	0	5	Japan	
2007	IBSA World Championships and Games	Germany	5 August	Brazil	2	1	Germany	
2007	IBSA World Championships and Games	Brazil	6 August	Brazil	4 (3 OT)	4 (1 OT)	Japan	

=== Goal scoring by competition ===
Player	Goals	Competition	Notes	Ref
Masae Komia	17	2007 IBSA World Championships and Games		
Yuki Naoi	10	2007 IBSA World Championships and Games		
Masako Nomura	3	2007 IBSA World Championships and Games		
Akiko Adachi	3	2007 IBSA World Championships and Games		

== See also ==
- Disabled sports
- Japan men's national goalball team
- Japan at the Paralympics
