= Egypt women's national goalball team =

Egyptian national team, for the Paralympic sport of goalball

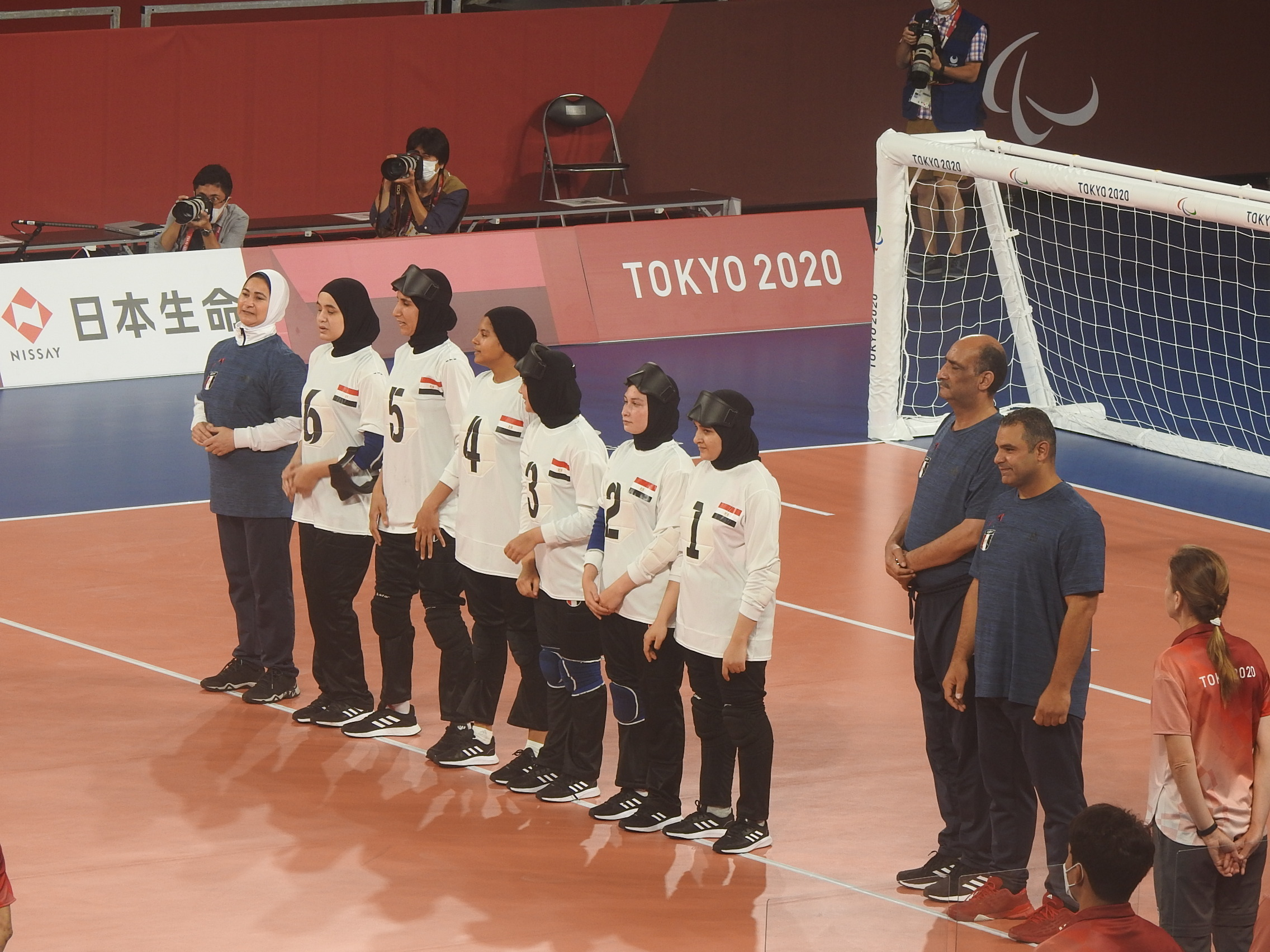
- Egypt women's women's goalball team lined up against Japan, Tokyo 2020 Paralympic Games (August 2021).
- Sport: Goalball
- League: IBSA
- Division: Women
- Region: IBSA Africa
- Location: Egypt
- Colours: Red, white, black
- Championships: Paralympic Games medals: : 0: 0: 0 World Championship medals: : 0: 0: 0
- Parent group: Egyptian Paralympic Committee

Egypt women's national goalball team is the women's national team of Egypt. Goalball is a team sport designed specifically for athletes with a vision impairment. The team takes part in international goalball competitions.

== Paralympic Games ==
=== 2020 Tokyo ===
With the withdrawal of the Algeria women's team by 21 April 2021, the International Paralympic Committee selected Egypt as a replacement at the Tokyo 2020 Paralympic Games. This was Egypt women's first Paralympic Games participation.

The following is the Egypt roster in the women's goalball tournament of the 2020 Summer Paralympics.

No.	Player	Class	Date of birth (age)
1	Hanan Tolba	B1	20 November 1995 (aged 25)
2	Esraa Walid Ezzeldin	B2	27 July 2002 (aged 19)
3	Gehad Ezzeldin	B2	8 July 1999 (aged 22)
4	Israa Gadalla	B2	1 March 2003 (aged 18)
5	Hassnaa Elgabry	B2	4 March 1996 (aged 25)
6	Aya Ahmed	B1	6 December 1995 (aged 25)

Pos	Team	Pld	W	D	L	GF	GA	GD	Pts	Qualification
1	Turkey	4	3	0	1	30	11	+19	9	Quarterfinals
2	United States	4	3	0	1	22	10	+12	9	Quarterfinals
3	Japan (H)	4	2	1	1	18	13	+5	7	Quarterfinals
4	Brazil	4	1	1	2	23	19	+4	4	Quarterfinals
5	Egypt	4	0	0	4	3	43	−40	0	

Source: TOCOG
Rules for classification: 1) points; 2) goal difference; 3) number of wins; 4) goals against; 5) head-to-head goal difference.
(H) Hosts

Round-robin

26 August 2021; 14:45	Egypt	2–12	Turkey	Makuhari Messe, Tokyo; Referees: Raquel Gomez Aguado (Spain), Raili Sipura (Finland)
26 August 2021; 14:45	Elgabry 1 Ezzeldin 1	Report	Sevd. Altunoluk 8 Sevt. Altunoluk 2 Güler 1 Çelik 1	Makuhari Messe, Tokyo; Referees: Raquel Gomez Aguado (Spain), Raili Sipura (Finland)

27 August 2021
19:00

United States	10–0	Egypt
Dennis 1', 4', 5', 6'; Czechowski 5', 12'; Mason 7', 8'; Miller 11', 15'	Report

Makuhari Messe, Tokyo
Referee: Vaida Pokvytytė (Lithuania), Bas Spaans (Netherlands)

29 August 2021
10:30

Egypt	0–10	Japan
	Report	Hagiwara 1', 1', 5', 6', 7', 8', 8'; Kakehata 1', 6', 7'

Makuhari Messe, Tokyo
Referee: Woradet Kultawongwattana (Thailand), Svitlana Moroz (Ukraine)

30 August 2021
10:30

Brazil	11–1	Egypt
Gomes 1', 6', 7', 9', 11', 12', 15', 16'; Ferreira 13', 14'; Custodio 15'	Report	Elgabry 12'

Makuhari Messe, Tokyo
Referee: Launel Scott (Canada), Woradet Kultawongwattana (Thailand)
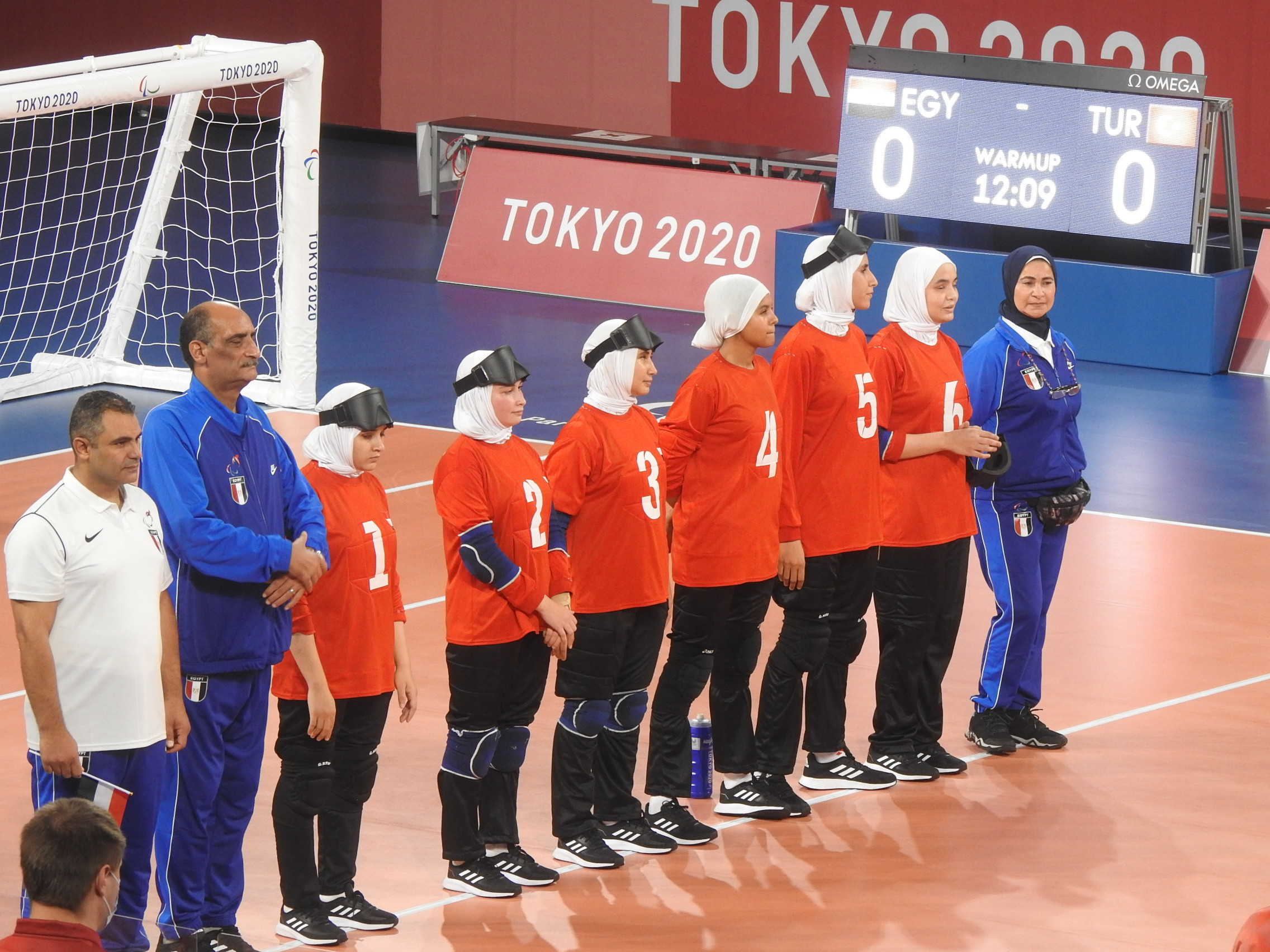
Lining up against Turkey women's.

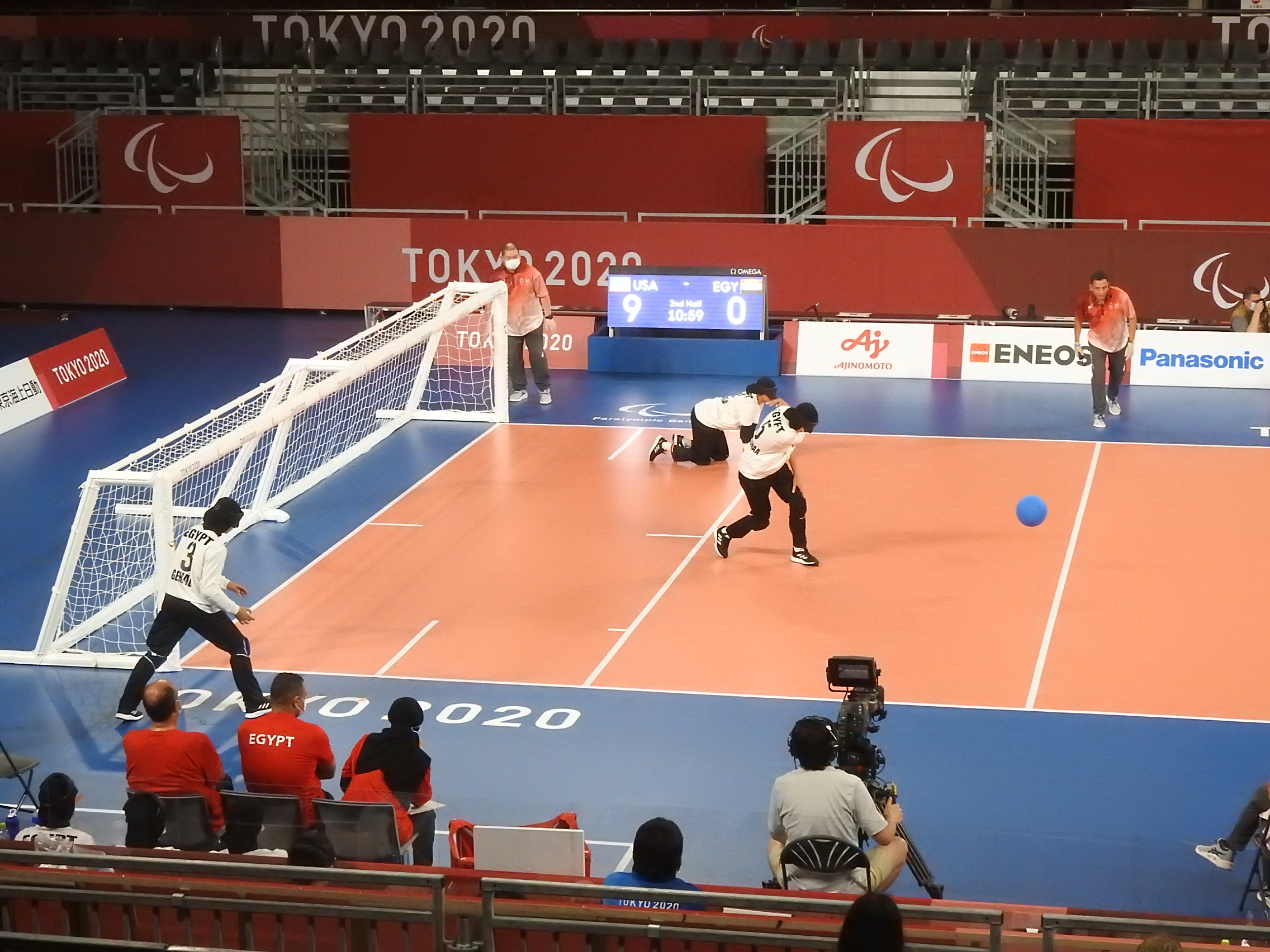
Throwing towards United States'.

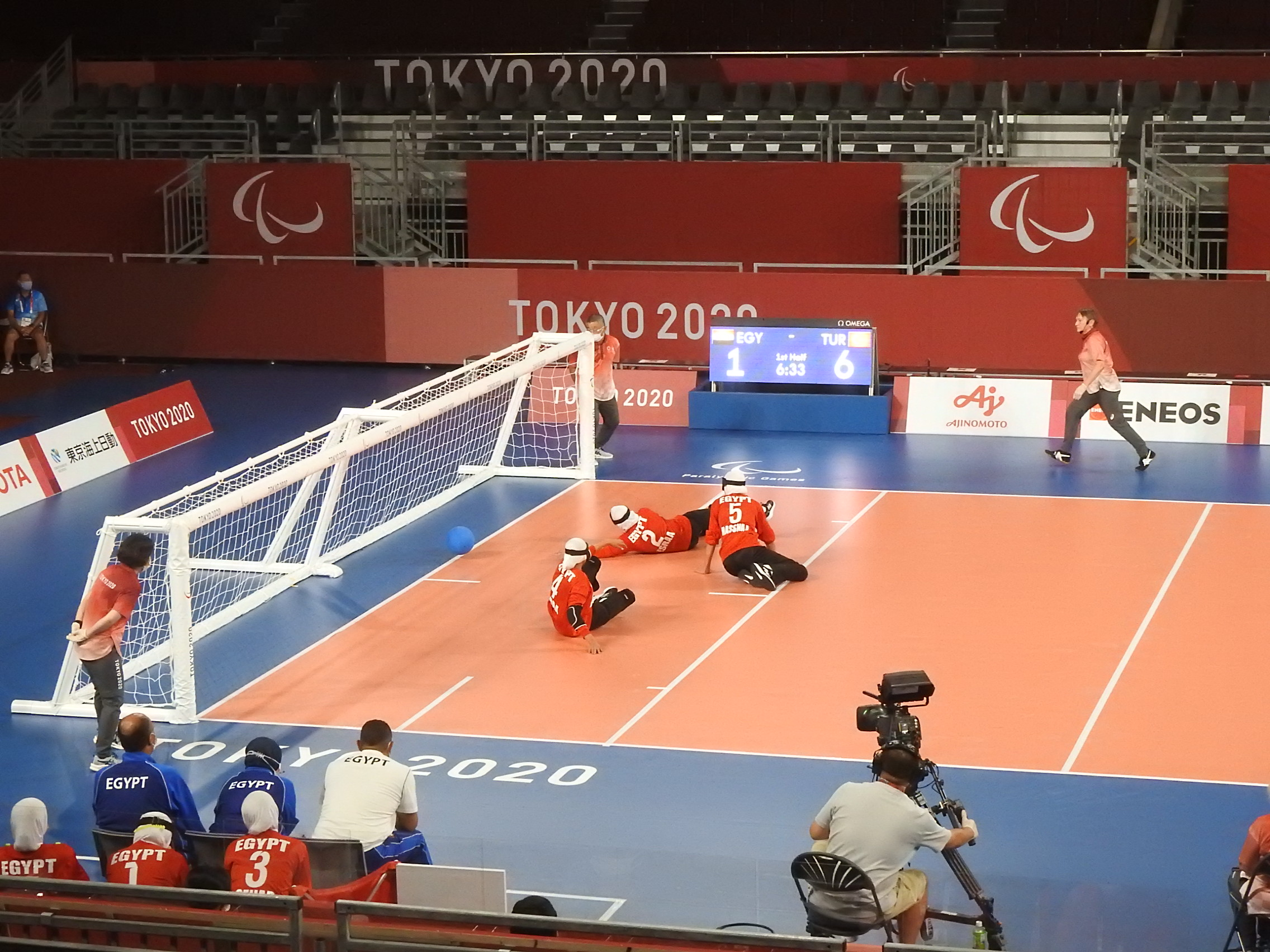
Defending against Turkey women's.

== World championships ==
=== 1986 Roermond ===
The 1986 IBSA World Goalball Championships were held in Roermond, the Netherlands. The team was one of ten teams participating (Australia, Belgium, Canada, Denmark, Egypt, Finland, Germany, Great Britain, Holland, United States), and they finished tenth overall.

=== 2022 Matosinhos ===
The team were eligible to compete in the 2022 World Championships, by placing second in the 2021 regional championships.

The team competed in the 2022 World Championships from 7 to 16 December 2022, at the Centro de Desportos e Congressos de Matosinhos, Portugal. There were sixteen men's and sixteen women's teams. They placed seventh in Pool B, and fourteenth in final standings.

== Regional championships ==
The team competes in the IBSA Africa goalball region.

=== 2020 Port Said ===
The team competed at the 2020 IBSA Goalball African Championships, from 2 and 5 March 2020, at Port Said, Egypt, against Algeria and Morocco. This regional tournament would have been a regional championships if Ghana and Kenya women's teams had attended as originally indicated. Of the three women's teams (Algeria, Egypt, Morocco), Egypt was mercied 12:2 by Algeria in the finals to take the silver medal.

=== 2021 Cape Coast ===
The team competed at the 2021 IBSA Goalball African Championships, from Monday 6 to Friday 10 December 2021, at the University of Cape Coast Sports Complex, Cape Coast, Ghana. This championships was a qualifier for the 2022 World Championships. Of the four women's teams (Algeria, Egypt, Ghana, Kenya), Egypt was mercied by Algeria 10:0, and was awarded the silver medal.

== See also ==
- Disabled sports
- Egypt men's national goalball team
- Egypt at the Paralympics
