= Great Britain women's national goalball team =

British national team, for the Paralympic sport of goalball

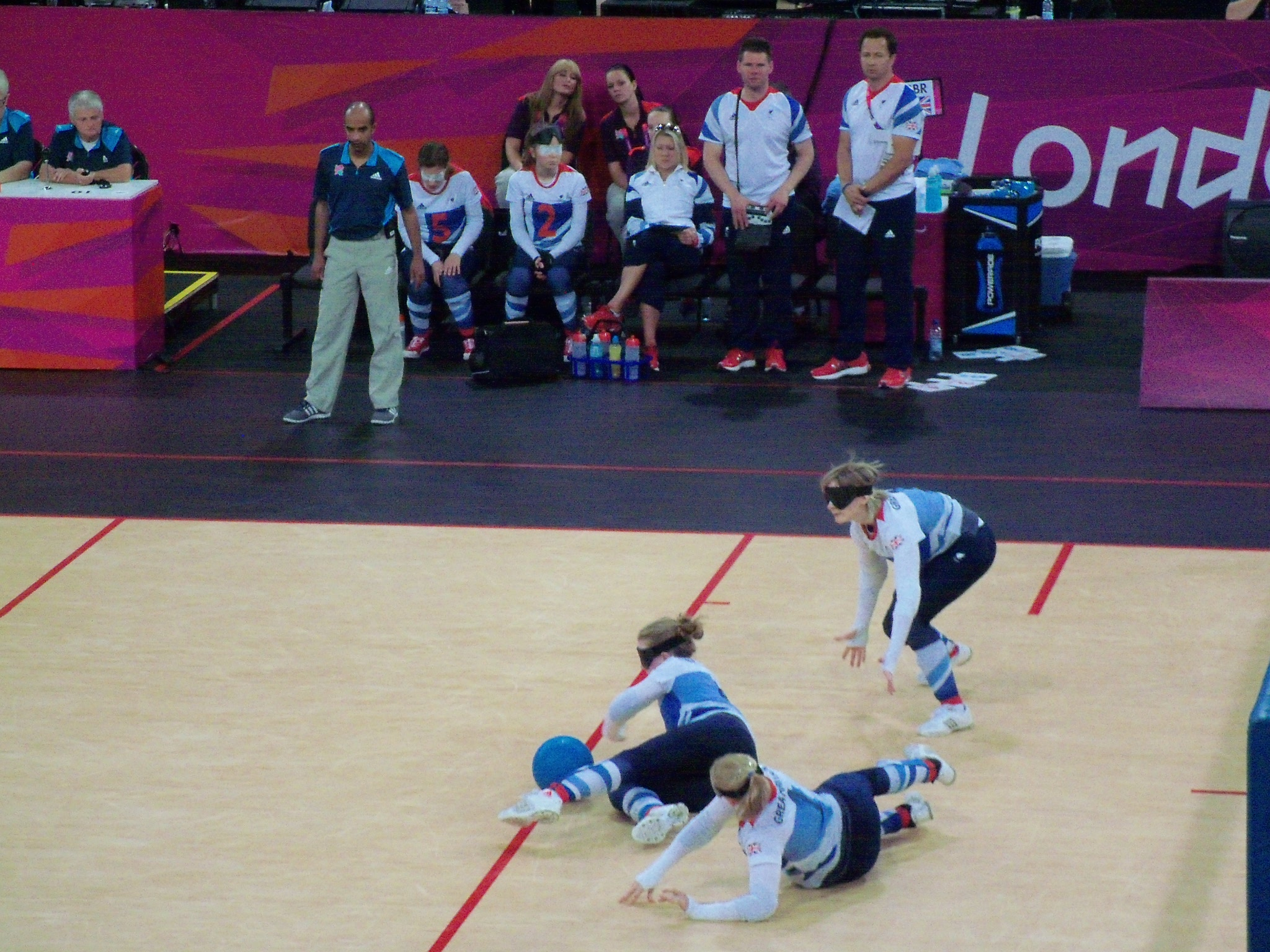
- Great Britain women's goalball team defending, Copper Box arena, 2012 Paralympic Games, London, England (Sep 2012).
- Sport: Goalball
- League: IBSA
- Division: Women
- Region: IBSA Europe
- Location: Sheffield, England
- Colours: Dark blue, White
- Head coach: Aaron Ford, Becky Ashworth
- Championships: Paralympic Games medals: :0:0:0; World Championship medals: :0:0:0
- Parent group: Goalball UK; ParalympicsGB
- Website: goalballuk.com

The Great Britain women's national goalball team is the women's national team of Great Britain. Goalball is a team sport designed specifically for athletes with a vision impairment. It takes part in international goalball competitions.

== Paralympic Games ==
=== 1988 Seoul ===
The team competed in the 1988 Summer Paralympics, from 15 to 24 October 1988, in Seoul, South Korea. The team finished eighth.

=== 2000 Sydney ===
The team competed in the 2000 Summer Paralympics, between 18 and 29 October 2000, at an Olympic Park indoor hall, Sydney, New South Wales, Australia. They finished fifth.

=== 2012 London ===
As the host nation, the team competed in the 2012 Summer Paralympics from 30 August to 7 September 2012, in the Copper Box Arena, London, England. In Group A, they came second behind China, and went onto the quarter-finals, to lose to Sweden, 1:2.

Athletes were Georgina Bullen, Jessica Luke, Amy Ottaway, Anna Sharkey, and Louise Simpson.

The following is the Great Britain roster in the women's goalball tournament of the 2012 Summer Paralympics.

No.	Player	Age
1	Anna Sharkey	25
2	Amy Ottaway	19
3	Jessica Luke	25
4	Georgina Bullen	18
5	Louise Simpson	28

30 August 2012; 18:30	China	7 – 1	Great Britain	Copper Box, London; Referees: Janned Ahokas (FIN), Dawna Christy (CAN)
30 August 2012; 18:30	Wang R. 4 Chen 2 Lin 1	Report	Sharkey 1	Copper Box, London; Referees: Janned Ahokas (FIN), Dawna Christy (CAN)

31 August 2012; 15:00	Finland	1 – 1	Great Britain	Copper Box, London; Referees: Morten Hammershoi (DEN), Ali Aldarsony (KSA)
31 August 2012; 15:00	Leppänen 1	Report	Luke 1	Copper Box, London; Referees: Morten Hammershoi (DEN), Ali Aldarsony (KSA)

2 September 2012; 09:00	Great Britain	3 – 1	Brazil	Copper Box, London; Referees: Ali Aldarsony (KSA), Morten Hammershoi (DEN)
2 September 2012; 09:00	Sharkey 2 Luke 1	Report	de Souza 1	Copper Box, London; Referees: Ali Aldarsony (KSA), Morten Hammershoi (DEN)

4 September 2012; 09:00	Great Britain	5 – 0	Denmark	Copper Box, London; Referees: Kimberly Anderson (USA), Shinji Mizuno (JPN)
4 September 2012; 09:00	Sharkey 3 Luke 1 Ottaway 1	Report		Copper Box, London; Referees: Kimberly Anderson (USA), Shinji Mizuno (JPN)

Quarter-finals

5 September 2012; 12:45	Great Britain	1 – 2	Sweden	Copper Box, London; Referees: Carla Da Matta (BRA), Thomas Baerz (GER)
5 September 2012; 12:45	Sharkey 1	Report	Gustavsson 2	Copper Box, London; Referees: Carla Da Matta (BRA), Thomas Baerz (GER)

=== 2020 Tokyo ===
Great Britain placed fourth in the October 2019 Regional Championships at Rostock, which was not sufficient to get a Paralympic berth. However they had attended the July 2019 Fort Wayne qualifying tournament, where they placed sixth. When all 2020 Summer Paralympics goalball slots assigned for Tokyo were filled, this left the team as the next available team from the ranking tournament.

Under regulation 47.4.5 of the goalball rules, 'After all Pre-Paralympic Qualification Tournaments are completed, the remaining Paralympic Games qualification slots will be filled using the results from the IBSA Paralympic Goalball Ranking Tournament, selecting teams in the order of finish'. The IBSA Africa regional championship at Port Said in March 2020 did not have the required number of participating teams to constitute a regional championship under regulation 47 (in part, 'Tournaments must have a minimum of four participating countries to qualify as a regional championship tournament...'). However IBSA accepted the Algeria women's national goalball team to the slot. In April 2021 on the eve of the competition group draw, Algeria withdrew without a reason, and several days later, the International Paralympic Committee announced Egypt had received the slot, 'following its redistribution by the International Paralympic Committee (IPC) according to the Tokyo 2020 Paralympic Games Qualification Regulations'.

Within days, Goalball UK had sought legal advice regarding this action, the chief executive officer stating:

For almost two years, we have had assurances that as first reserve for a place at Tokyo 2020 it could realistically present an opportunity for our women’s Great Britain squad to compete at the Paralympics if there was a withdrawal from the tournament. ... Unfortunately, it has now become apparent that this was never the case despite Great Britain's ranking.

== World Championships ==
=== 1986 Roermond ===
The 1986 IBSA World Goalball Championships were held in Roermond, the Netherlands. The team was one of ten teams participating, and they finished seventh overall.

=== 1998 Madrid ===
The team competed in the 1998 World Championships, in Madrid, Spain. The team was one of eleven teams participating, and they finished fourth overall.

=== 2010 Sheffield ===
As the host nation, and in the lead-up to the 2012 London Paralympic Games, the team competed in the 2010 World Championships, from 20 to 25 June 2010, in Sheffield, England. In Pool Y, they lost to China 0:0, Finland 0:7, Russia 2:3, Japan 1:2, but beat Denmark 1:0.

=== 2022 Matosinhos ===
The team competed in the 2022 World Championships from 7 to 16 December 2022, at the Centro de Desportos e Congressos de Matosinhos, Portugal. There were sixteen men's and sixteen women's teams. They placed fourth in Pool B, and seventh in final standings.

== IBSA World Games ==
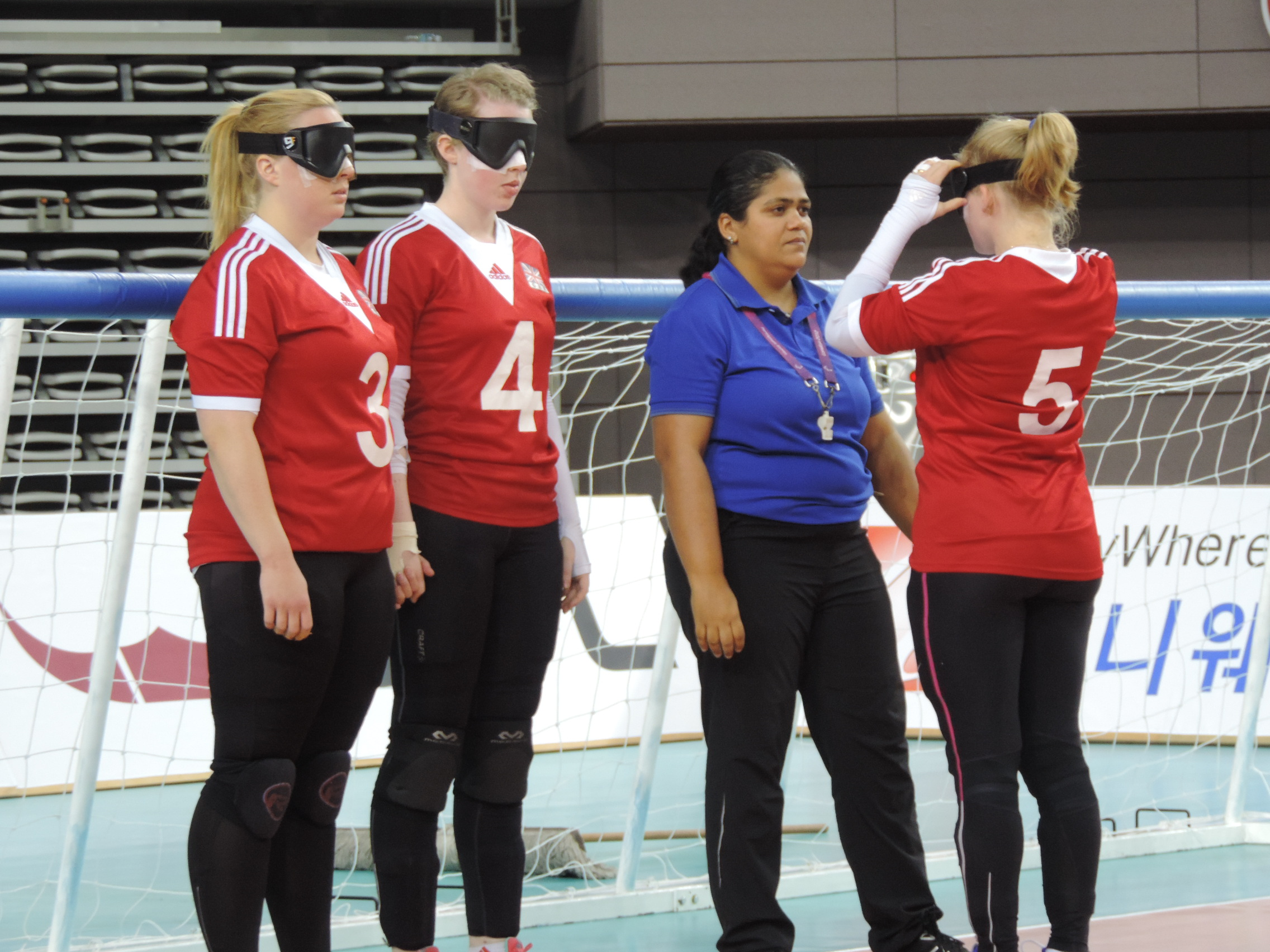
#5 Anna Sharkey having eyeshades inspected, watched by #4 Georgina Bullen and #3, at the IBSA World Games, Seoul, South Korea (May 2015).

=== 2007 São Paulo ===
The team competed in the 2003 IBSA World Games, from 28 July 2007 to 8 August 2007, in São Paulo, Brazil. The women's goalball competition included thirteen teams, including this one. The competition was a 2008 Summer Paralympics qualifying event. Maria Tzalla was ninth in the competition in scoring with 12 points.

=== 2015 Seoul ===
The team competed in the 2015 IBSA World Games from 10 to 17 May 2015, in Seoul, South Korea. They placed fifth of the eight teams.

== Regional championships ==
The team competes in the IBSA Europe goalball region. Groups A and C are held one year, and Group B the following year. Strong teams move towards Group A.

=== 2005 Neerpelt ===
The team competed in the 2015 IBSA European Regional Championships, from 15 to 23 October 2005, in Neerpelt and Overpelt, Belgium. Organised by the Vlaamse Liga Gehandicaptensport vzw (Flemish Sport Federation for Persons with a Disability), it hosted the men's Groups A and B (Belgium, Czech Republic, Denmark, Finland, Germany, Great Britain, Hungary, Italy, Lithuania, Slovakia, Slovenia, Spain, Sweden, and Ukraine), and the women division (Belarus, Denmark, Finland, Germany, Great Britain, Greece, Netherlands, Spain, Sweden, and Ukraine). Games were held in the Provinciaal Domein Dommelhof Sport in Neerpelt, and Sportcentrum De Bemvoort in Overpelt. With ten teams competing, the team finished ninth.

=== 2007 Antalya ===
The team competed at the 2007 IBSA Goalball European Championships, hosted by the Turkish Blind Sports Federation, in Antalya, Turkey with 11 teams contesting the women's competition. The team finished ninth.

=== 2009 Munich (Group A) ===
The team competed at the 2009 European Championships, in Munich, Germany, with eleven teams taking part. The team finished the event in first place.

=== 2013 Konya (Group A) ===
The team competed in the 2013 IBSA Goalball European Championships, Group A, from 1 to 11 November 2013, at Konya, Turkey. They finished eighth.

=== 2017 Pajulahti (Group A) ===
The team competed in the 2017 IBSA Goalball European A Championships from 15 to 23 September 2017, at Pajulahti, Nastola, Finland. Coming third in Pool X, they lost to Greece in the quarter-finals, 0:1. They beat Germany 5:3 for placement, and finished sixth overall.

Athletes included Georgina Bullen, Laura Perry, and Anna Tipton.

=== 2019 Rostock (Group A) ===
The team competed in the 2019 IBSA Goalball European A Championships from 5 to 14 October 2019, in Rostock, Germany. They placed second in the final standings. They placed fourth, behind Germany, Israel and winners Turkey.

Athletes were Georgina Bullen, Antonia Bunyan, Sarah Leiter, Kali Holder, Meme Robertson, and Lois Turner. Coaches were Aaron Ford and Becky Ashworth, and staff Jim Wallis.

== Competitive history ==
The table below contains individual game results for the team in international matches and competitions.

Year	Event	Opponent	Date	Venue	Team	Team	Winner	Ref
2007	IBSA Goalball European Championships	Netherlands	25 April	OHEP Koleji Spor Salonu, Anyalya, Turkey	4	5	Netherlands	
2007	IBSA Goalball European Championships	Germany	25 April	OHEP Koleji Spor Salonu, Anyalya, Turkey	1	2	Germany	
2007	IBSA Goalball European Championships	Ukraine	26 April	OHEP Koleji Spor Salonu, Anyalya, Turkey	5	2	Ukraine	
2007	IBSA Goalball European Championships	Spain	26 April	OHEP Koleji Spor Salonu, Anyalya, Turkey	3	0	Spain	
2007	IBSA Goalball European Championships	Turkey	27 April	OHEP Koleji Spor Salonu, Anyalya, Turkey	8	4	Great Britain	
2007	IBSA Goalball European Championships	Russia	27 April	OHEP Koleji Spor Salonu, Anyalya, Turkey	7	3	Great Britain	
2007	IBSA World Championships and Games	Greece	31 July	Brazil	1	4	Great Britain	
2007	IBSA World Championships and Games	Sweden	1 August	Brazil	1	3	Sweden	
2007	IBSA World Championships and Games	Italy	1 August	Brazil	6	2	Great Britain	
2007	IBSA World Championships and Games	Germany	2 August	Brazil	1	5	Germany	
2007	IBSA World Championships and Games	Iran	3 August	Brazil	7	9	Great Britain	
2007	IBSA World Championships and Games	Finland	4 August	Brazil	3	4	Great Britain	
2007	IBSA World Championships and Games	Japan	5 August	Brazil	0	5	Japan	
2009	IBSA Goalball European Championships	Spain	24 August	Munich, Germany	2	7	Great Britain	
2009	IBSA Goalball European Championships	Finland	24 August	Munich, Germany	10	3	Finland	
2009	IBSA Goalball European Championships	Germany	25 August	Munich, Germany	2	9	Great Britain	
2009	IBSA Goalball European Championships	Israel	26 August	Munich, Germany	0	7	Great Britain	
2009	IBSA Goalball European Championships	Turkey	27 August	Munich, Germany	3	8	Great Britain	
2009	IBSA Goalball European Championships	Russia	28 August	Munich, Germany	3	4	Great Britain	
2009	IBSA Goalball European Championships	Finland	29 August	Munich, Germany	7	5	Great Britain	
2009	IBSA Goalball European Championships	Denmark	29 August	Munich, Germany	7	3	Great Britain	
2013	IBSA Goalball European Championships	Sweden	1–11 November	Konya, Turkey	4	9	Great Britain	
2013	IBSA Goalball European Championships	Ukraine	1–11 November	Konya, Turkey	5	2	Ukraine	
2013	IBSA Goalball European Championships	Russia	1–11 November	Konya, Turkey	10	4	Russia	
2013	IBSA Goalball European Championships	Finland	1–11 November	Konya, Turkey	9	3	Finland	
2013	IBSA Goalball European Championships	Turkey	7 November	Konya, Turkey	13	3	Turkey	
2013	IBSA Goalball European Championships	Ukraine	8 November	Konya, Turkey	2	1	Ukraine	
2013	IBSA Goalball European Championships	Spain	8 November	Konya, Turkey	2	1	Spain	

=== Goal scoring by competition ===
Player	Goals	Competition	Notes	Ref
Emily Luke	31	2009 IBSA Goalball European Championships		
Jessica Luke	11	2007 IBSA World Championships and Games		
Anna Sharkey	8	2007 IBSA World Championships and Games		
Louise Simpson	5	2007 IBSA World Championships and Games		
Jessica Luke	2	2009 IBSA Goalball European Championships		
Anna Sharkey	2	2009 IBSA Goalball European Championships		
Louise Simpson	1	2009 IBSA Goalball European Championships		
Georgina Bullen	1	2009 IBSA Goalball European Championships		

== See also ==
- Disabled sports
- Great Britain men's national goalball team
- Great Britain women's junior national goalball team
- Great Britain at the Paralympics
