= Goalball at the 2012 Summer Paralympics – Women's tournament =

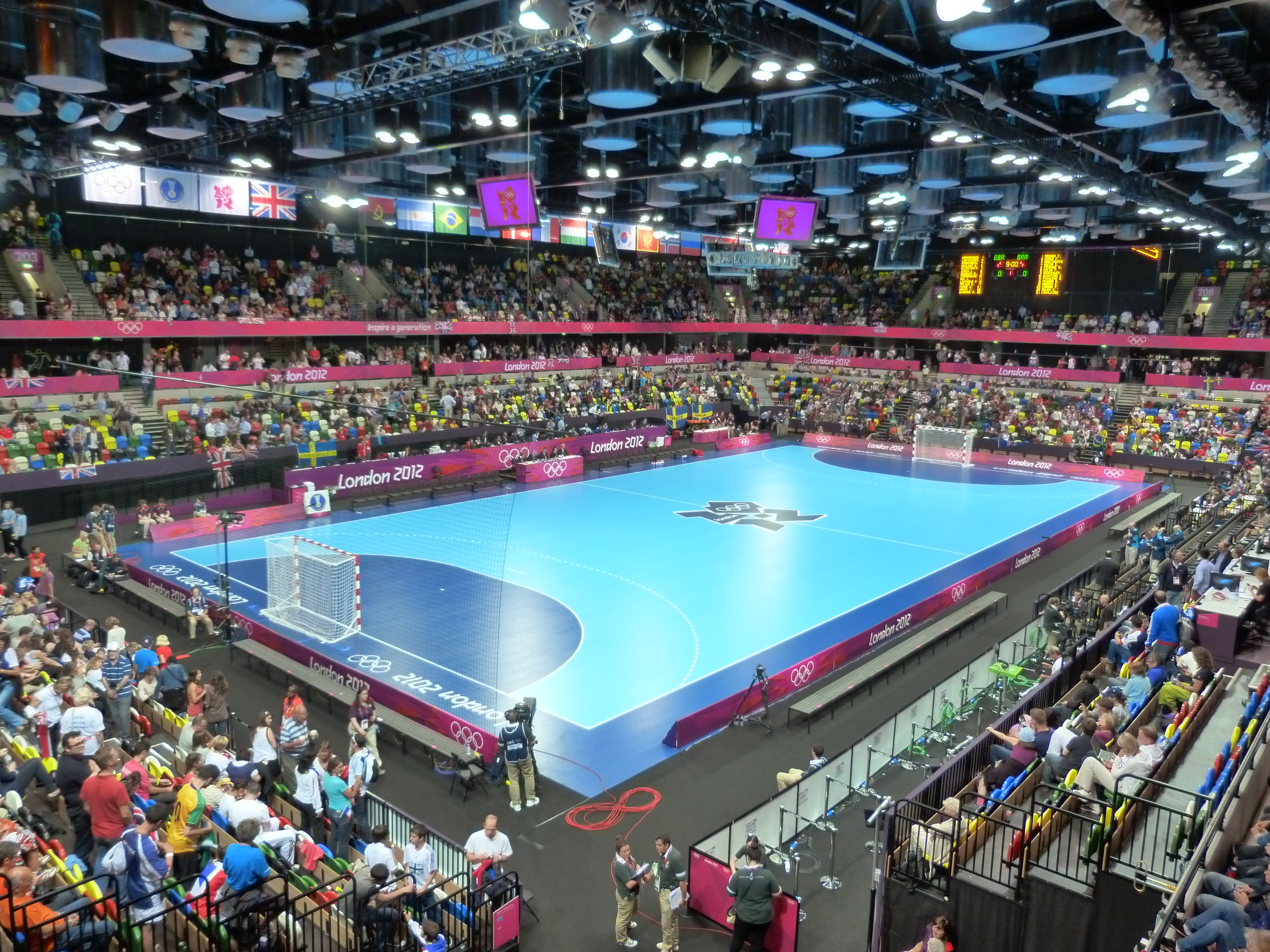
Goalball at the 2012 Summer Paralympics was held at the Copper Box.

The women's tournament in goalball at the 2012 Summer Paralympics was contested from 30 August to 7 September. 28 matches were played; 20 in the group play, 4 quarter-finals, 2 semi-finals, a bronze medal match, and a gold medal match.

Ten teams participated, with six athletes per team. Japan won the gold medal by beating China in the final, while Sweden beat Finland in the match for bronze.

== Competition format ==
The teams were divided into two equal groups for a single round robin group stage. The top four teams of each group advanced to the quarter-finals. All matches in the second stage were knock-out format.

=== Participating teams ===
Group C

- Brazil (roster)
- China (roster)
- Finland (roster)
- Denmark (roster)
- Great Britain (roster)

Group D

- Australia (roster)
- Canada (roster)
- Japan (roster)
- Sweden (roster)
- United States (roster)

=== Venue ===
All matches were played in the Copper Box.

== Preliminary round ==
All times are local (BST/UTC+1)

=== Group C ===
Team	Pld	W	D	L	GF	GA	GD	Pts	Qualification
China	4	4	0	0	28	4	+24	12	Quarterfinals
Great Britain	4	2	1	1	10	9	+1	7	Quarterfinals
Brazil	4	2	0	2	8	15	−7	6	Quarterfinals
Finland	4	1	1	2	10	13	−3	4	Quarterfinals
Denmark	4	0	0	4	3	18	−15	0	Eliminated

Source: "London 2012 Paralympic Games - Goalball results" (PDF). Paralympic.org. 2012-10-03 – via Goalball.sport.

30 August 2012; 18:30	China	7 – 1	Great Britain	Copper Box, London; Referees: Janned Ahokas (FIN), Dawna Christy (CAN)
30 August 2012; 18:30	Wang R. 4 Chen 2 Lin 1	Report	Sharkey 1	Copper Box, London; Referees: Janned Ahokas (FIN), Dawna Christy (CAN)

30 August 2012; 19:45	Denmark	0 – 2	Brazil	Copper Box, London; Referees: Hooshang Shariati (IRI), Vilma Venckutonyte (LTU)
30 August 2012; 19:45		Report	Bonfim Vieira dos Santos 2	Copper Box, London; Referees: Hooshang Shariati (IRI), Vilma Venckutonyte (LTU)

31 August 2012; 15:00	Finland	1 – 1	Great Britain	Copper Box, London; Referees: Morten Hammershoi (DEN), Ali Aldarsony (KSA)
31 August 2012; 15:00	Leppänen 1	Report	Luke 1	Copper Box, London; Referees: Morten Hammershoi (DEN), Ali Aldarsony (KSA)

31 August 2012; 16:15	Brazil	0 – 8	China	Copper Box, London; Referees: Juha Vuokila (FIN), Dina Murdie (GBR)
31 August 2012; 16:15		Report	Wang S. 5 Chen 1 Lin 1 Ju 1	Copper Box, London; Referees: Juha Vuokila (FIN), Dina Murdie (GBR)

1 September 2012; 21:00	Denmark	2 – 3	Finland	Copper Box, London; Referees: Christl Daentler (GER), Tony Connolly (USA)
1 September 2012; 21:00	Jørgensen 2	Report	Leppänen 2 Heikkinen 1	Copper Box, London; Referees: Christl Daentler (GER), Tony Connolly (USA)

2 September 2012; 09:00	Great Britain	3 – 1	Brazil	Copper Box, London; Referees: Ali Aldarsony (KSA), Morten Hammershoi (DEN)
2 September 2012; 09:00	Sharkey 2 Luke 1	Report	de Souza 1	Copper Box, London; Referees: Ali Aldarsony (KSA), Morten Hammershoi (DEN)

3 September 2012; 13:45	China	8 – 1	Denmark	Copper Box, London; Referees: Tony Connolly (USA), Ali Aldarsony (KSA)
3 September 2012; 13:45	Chen 4 Wang S. 3 Ju 1	Report	Jørgensen 1	Copper Box, London; Referees: Tony Connolly (USA), Ali Aldarsony (KSA)

3 September 2012; 15:00	Brazil	5 – 4	Finland	Copper Box, London

4 September 2012; 09:00	Great Britain	5 – 0	Denmark	Copper Box, London; Referees: Kimberly Anderson (USA), Shinji Mizuno (JPN)
4 September 2012; 09:00	Sharkey 3 Luke 1 Ottaway 1	Report		Copper Box, London; Referees: Kimberly Anderson (USA), Shinji Mizuno (JPN)

4 September 2012; 10:15	Finland	2 – 5	China	Copper Box, London; Referees: Bulent Kimyon (TUR), Launel Scott (CAN)
4 September 2012; 10:15	Hynninen 1 Somerkivi 1	Report	Wang R. 4 Chen 1	Copper Box, London; Referees: Bulent Kimyon (TUR), Launel Scott (CAN)

=== Group D ===
Team	Pld	W	D	L	GF	GA	GD	Pts	Qualification
Canada	4	3	0	1	6	3	+3	9	Quarterfinals
Japan	4	2	1	1	5	3	+2	7	Quarterfinals
Sweden	4	2	1	1	11	11	0	7	Quarterfinals
United States	4	2	0	2	9	4	+5	6	Quarterfinals
Australia	4	0	0	4	7	17	−10	0	Eliminated

Source: "London 2012 Paralympic Games - Goalball results" (PDF). Paralympic.org. 2012-10-03 – via Goalball.sport.

30 August 2012; 21:00	United States	5 – 1	Sweden	Copper Box, London; Referees: Yasser Oman (EGY), Warrick Jackes (AUS)
30 August 2012; 21:00	Armbruster 3 Czechowski 1 Miller 1	Report	Jälmestål 1	Copper Box, London; Referees: Yasser Oman (EGY), Warrick Jackes (AUS)

31 August 2012; 09:00	Australia	1 – 3	Japan	Copper Box, London; Referees: Hooshang Shariati (IRI), Yasser Omar (EGY)
31 August 2012; 09:00	Esdaile 1	Report	Adacho 2 Komiya 1	Copper Box, London; Referees: Hooshang Shariati (IRI), Yasser Omar (EGY)

1 September 2012; 13:45	Canada	1 – 2	Sweden	Copper Box, London; Referees: Bulent Kimyor (TUR), Thomas Bärz (GER)
1 September 2012; 13:45	Kneebone 1	Report	Gustavsson 2	Copper Box, London; Referees: Bulent Kimyor (TUR), Thomas Bärz (GER)

1 September 2012; 15:00	Japan	2 – 1	United States	Copper Box, London

2 September 2012; 10:15	Australia	1 – 3	Canada	Copper Box, London; Referees: Juha Vuokila (FIN), Dina Murdie (GBR)
2 September 2012; 10:15	Christensen 1	Report	Kneebone 2 Morin 1	Copper Box, London; Referees: Juha Vuokila (FIN), Dina Murdie (GBR)

2 September 2012; 11:30	Sweden	0 – 0	Japan	Copper Box, London; Referees: Tony Collonny (USA), Christl Däntler (GER)
2 September 2012; 11:30		Report		Copper Box, London; Referees: Tony Collonny (USA), Christl Däntler (GER)

3 September 2012; 18:30	United States	3 – 0	Australia	Copper Box, London; Referees: Thomas Baerz (GER), Bulent Kimyon (TUR)
3 September 2012; 18:30	Armbruster 3	Report		Copper Box, London; Referees: Thomas Baerz (GER), Bulent Kimyon (TUR)

3 September 2012; 19:45	Japan	0 – 1	Canada	Copper Box, London

4 September 2012; 12:30	Sweden	8 – 5	Australia	Copper Box, London; Referees: Hooshang Shariati (IRI), Janne Ahokas (FIN)
4 September 2012; 12:30	Gustavsson 5 Naesström 2 Jälmestål 1	Report	Esdaile 3 Christensen 2	Copper Box, London; Referees: Hooshang Shariati (IRI), Janne Ahokas (FIN)

4 September 2012; 13:45	Canada	1 – 0	United States	Copper Box, London

== Knock-out round ==
Quarterfinals
C1	China	5
D4	United States	0
D1	Canada	1
C4	Finland	2
C2	Great Britain	1
D3	Sweden	2
D2	Japan	2
C3	Brazil	0

Semifinals
C1	China	4
C4	Finland	1
D3	Sweden	3
D2	Japan	4

Finals
C1	China	0
D2	Japan	1
Third place
C4	Finland	1
D3	Sweden	5

=== Quarter-finals ===
5 September 2012; 09:00	China	5 – 0	United States	Copper Box, London; Referees: Dawna Christy (CAN), Juha Vuokila (FIN)
5 September 2012; 09:00	Chen 2 Wang S. 2 Lin 1	Report		Copper Box, London; Referees: Dawna Christy (CAN), Juha Vuokila (FIN)

5 September 2012; 10:30	Japan	2 – 0	Brazil	Copper Box, London
5 September 2012; 10:30		Report		Copper Box, London

5 September 2012; 12:45	Great Britain	1 – 2	Sweden	Copper Box, London; Referees: Carla Da Matta (BRA), Thomas Baerz (GER)
5 September 2012; 12:45	Sharkey 1	Report	Gustavsson 2	Copper Box, London; Referees: Carla Da Matta (BRA), Thomas Baerz (GER)

5 September 2012; 14:15	Canada	1 – 2	Finland	Copper Box, London

=== Semi-finals ===
6 September 2012; 13:30	China	4 – 1	Finland	Copper Box, London; Referees: Dawna Christy (CAN), Carla Da Matta (BRA)
6 September 2012; 13:30	Chen 2 Lin 1 Wang S. 1	Report	Leppänen 1	Copper Box, London; Referees: Dawna Christy (CAN), Carla Da Matta (BRA)

6 September 2012; 15:00	Sweden	3 – 4 (a.e.t.)	Japan	Copper Box, London; Referees: Dina Murdie (GBR), Launel Scott (CAN)
6 September 2012; 15:00	Gustavsson 1 Jälmestål 1 Wåglund 1	Report	Komiya 2 Adachi 1 Urata 1	Copper Box, London; Referees: Dina Murdie (GBR), Launel Scott (CAN)

=== Bronze medal match ===
7 September 2012; 13:30	Finland	1 – 5	Sweden	Copper Box, London; Referees: Carla Da Matta (BRA), Kimberly Anderson (USA)
7 September 2012; 13:30	Heikkinen 1	Report	Naesström 2 Gustavsson 2 Jälmestål 1	Copper Box, London; Referees: Carla Da Matta (BRA), Kimberly Anderson (USA)

=== Gold medal match ===
7 September 2012; 15:00	China	0 – 1	Japan	Copper Box, London
7 September 2012; 15:00		Report	Adachi 1	Copper Box, London

== Final rankings ==
Rank	Team
Gold medal	Japan
Silver medal	China
Bronze medal	Sweden
4.	Finland
5.	Canada
6.	Great Britain
7.	Brazil
8.	United States
9.	Australia
10.	Denmark

2012 women's Paralympic champions

Japan
First title

== Statistics ==
=== Leading goalscorers ===
Rank	Player	MP	G	P	T
1	Chen Fengqing (CHN)	7	12	0	12
2	Malin Gustavsson (SWE)	7	9	2	11
2	Wang Shasha (CHN)	6	10	1	11
4	Katja Heikkinen (FIN)	7	7	2	9
5	Wang Ruixue (CHN)	4	5	3	8
6	Jen Armbruster (USA)	5	3	4	7
6	Anna Sharkey (GBR)	5	7	0	7
8	Akiko Adachi (JPN)	6	4	2	6
9	Nicole Esdaile (AUS)	4	4	0	4
9	Josefine Jälmestål (SWE)	7	3	1	4
9	Amy Kneebone (CAN)	5	3	1	4
9	Krista Leppänen (FIN)	7	3	1	4
9	Lin Shan (CHN)	7	4	0	4
9	Sofia Naesström (SWE)	7	4	0	4

== See also ==
- Goalball at the 2012 Summer Paralympics – Men's tournament
