= Akane Nakashima =

Japanese goalball player

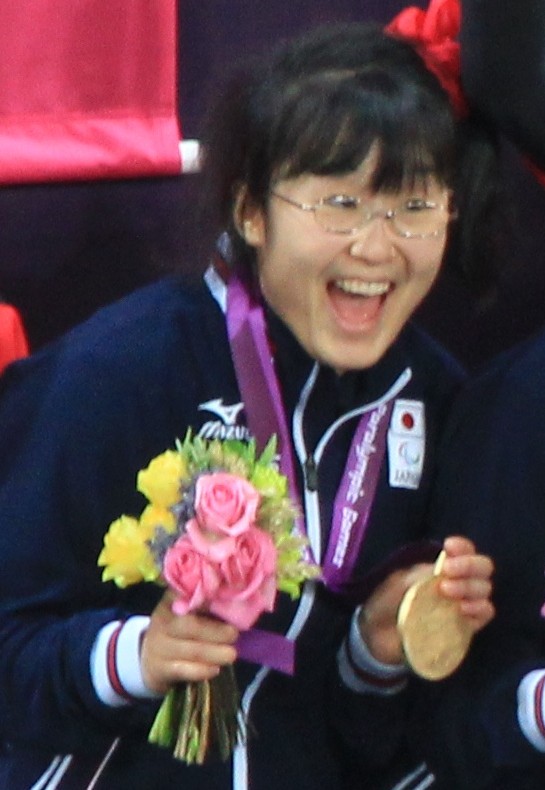
- Nakashima after winning the gold medal at the 2012 Summer Paralympics

Personal information
- Born: August 17, 1990 (age 36) Nakatsugawa, Gifu, Japan
- Education: Nihon Fukushi University
- Height: 159 cm (5 ft 3 in)
- Weight: 55 kg (121 lb)

Sport
- Sport: Women's goalball
- Disability class: B3
Medal record
Representing Japan
Paralympic Games
Gold medal – first place	2012 London	Team
Asian Para Games
Silver medal – second place	2010 Guangzhou	Team

Akane Nakashima (中嶋 茜, Nakashima Akane; born 17 August 1990) is a Japanese goalball player who won a gold medal at the 2012 Summer Paralympics.

Her visual impairment is congenital. She started playing goalball during the first year of junior high school.
