= Rie Urata =

Japanese goalball player

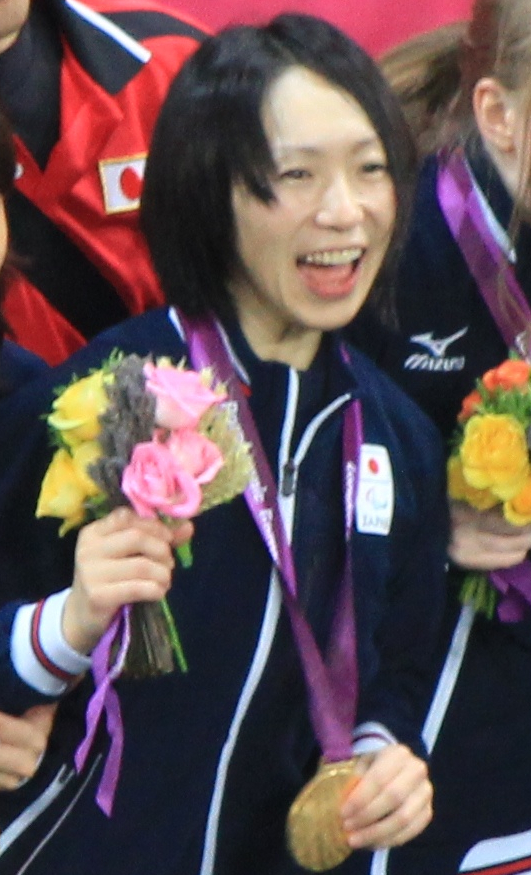
- Urata after winning the gold medal at the 2012 Summer Paralympics

Personal information
- Born: July 1, 1977 (age 48) Nankan, Kumamoto, Japan
- Education: University of Teacher Education Fukuoka
- Height: 159 cm (5 ft 3 in)
- Weight: 53 kg (117 lb)

Sport
- Sport: Women's goalball
- Disability class: B1
Medal record
Representing Japan
Paralympic Games
Gold medal – first place	2012 London	Team
Bronze medal – third place	2020 Tokyo	Team
Asian Para Games
Gold medal – first place	2018 Jakarta	Team
Silver medal – second place	2010 Guangzhou	Team
Bronze medal – third place	2014 Incheon	Team

Rie Urata (浦田 理恵, Urata Rie; born 1 July 1977) is a Japanese goalball player who won a gold medal at the 2012 Summer Paralympics.

Her impairment was caused by retinitis pigmentosa, which destroyed her vision in both eyes when she was 20 years old. She began playing goalball in 2004.
