= Goalball at the Summer Paralympics =

- Governing body: IBSA
- Events: 2 (men: 1; women: 1)

Games
- 1960; 1964; 1968; 1972; 1976; 1980; 1984; 1988; 1992; 1996; 2000; 2004; 2008; 2012; 2016; 2020; 2024
- Note: demonstration sport years indicated in italics
- Medalists

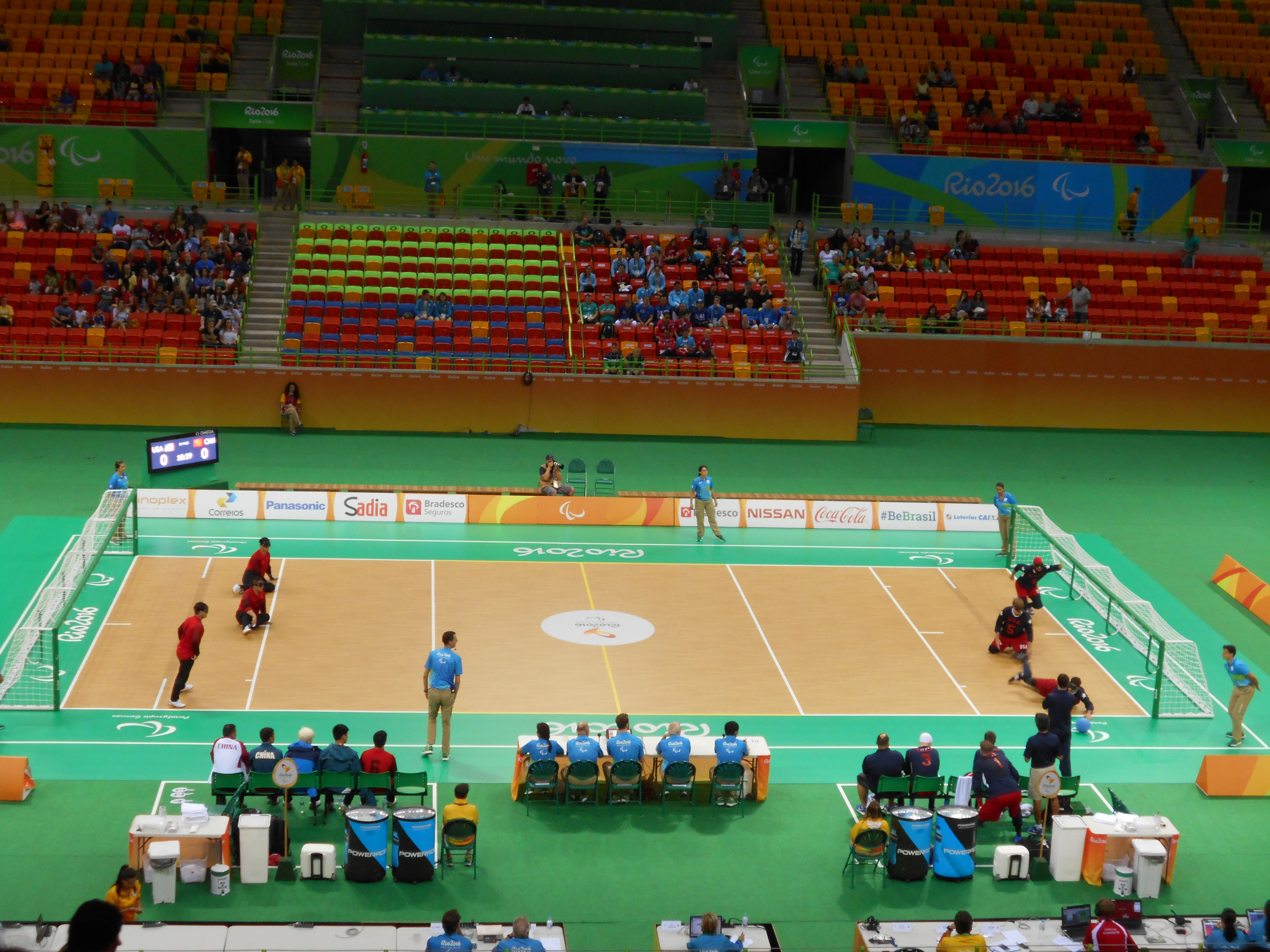
Men's goalball match of China (left) vs United States (right) at the 2016 Summer Paralympics in Rio de Janeiro, Brazil.

Goalball tournaments have been staged at the Paralympic Games since 1976, after being demonstrated in 1972.

== Results ==
=== Men ===
Games	Gold	Silver	Bronze
1976 Toronto	Austria	West Germany	Denmark
1980 Arnhem	West Germany	United States	Netherlands
1984 New York City	United States	Egypt	Yugoslavia
1988 Seoul	Yugoslavia	United States	Egypt
1992 Barcelona	Italy	Finland	Egypt
1996 Atlanta	Finland	Canada	Spain
2000 Sydney	Denmark	Lithuania	Sweden
2004 Athens	Denmark	Sweden	United States
2008 Beijing	China	Lithuania	Sweden
2012 London	Finland	Brazil	Turkey
2016 Rio	Lithuania	United States	Brazil
2020 Tokyo	Brazil	China	Lithuania
2024 Paris	Japan	Ukraine	Brazil

=== Women ===
Games	Gold	Silver	Bronze
1984 New York City	United States	Canada	Denmark
1988 Seoul	Denmark	United States	Canada
1992 Barcelona	Finland	Denmark	Canada
1996 Atlanta	Germany	Finland	United States
2000 Sydney	Canada	Spain	Sweden
2004 Athens	Canada	United States	Japan
2008 Beijing	United States	China	Denmark
2012 London	Japan	China	Sweden
2016 Rio	Turkey	China	United States
2020 Tokyo	Turkey	United States	Japan
2024 Paris	Turkey	Israel	China

== Medal table ==
Rank	Nation	Gold	Silver	Bronze	Total
1	United States (USA)	3	6	3	12
2	Finland (FIN)	3	2	0	5
3	Denmark (DEN)	3	1	3	7
4	Turkey (TUR)	3	0	1	4
5	Canada (CAN)	2	2	2	6
6	Germany (GER)	2	1	0	3
7	Japan (JPN)	2	0	2	4
8	China (CHN)	1	4	1	6
9	Lithuania (LTU)	1	2	1	4
10	Brazil (BRA)	1	1	2	4
11	Yugoslavia (YUG)	1	0	1	2
12	Austria (AUT)	1	0	0	1
12	Italy (ITA)	1	0	0	1
14	Sweden (SWE)	0	1	4	5
15	Egypt (EGY)	0	1	2	3
16	Spain (ESP)	0	1	1	2
17	Israel (ISR)	0	1	0	1
17	Ukraine (UKR)	0	1	0	1
19	Netherlands (NED)	0	0	1	1
Totals (19 entries)		24	24	24	72

== Participating nations ==
Tables of both men's and women's competitions of participating nations who took part in goalball including rank classifications during the tournament.

Key

- : denotes nation did not compete in that year.

X : denotes nation participated but didn't advance to the final rounds.

Q : denotes qualified for the next Paralympic Games.

=== Men ===
Nation	1976	1980	1984	1988	1992	1996	2000	2004	2008	2012	2016	2020	2024	Years
Algeria	-	-	-	-	12	-	-	-	-	8	10	10	-	4
Australia	-	X	-	11	11	4	9	-	-	-	-	-	-	5
Austria	1st place, gold medalist(s)	X	-	-	-	-	-	-	-	-	-	-	-	2
Belgium	4	X	-	-	-	-	-	-	10	7	-	6	-	5
Brazil	-	-	-	-	-	-	-	-	11	2nd place, silver medalist(s)	3rd place, bronze medalist(s)	1st place, gold medalist(s)	3rd place, bronze medalist(s)	5
Bulgaria	-	-	-	10	-	-	-	-	-	-	-	-	-	1
Canada	X	X	-	X	X	2nd place, silver medalist(s)	10	4	5	10	8	-	-	10
China	-	-	-	-	-	-	-	-	1st place, gold medalist(s)	6	7	2nd place, silver medalist(s)	4	5
Czech Republic	-	-	-	-	-	12	-	-	-	-	-	-	-	1
Denmark	3rd place, bronze medalist(s)	X	X	X	-	-	1st place, gold medalist(s)	1st place, gold medalist(s)	6	-	-	-	-	7
Egypt	-	11	2nd place, silver medalist(s)	3rd place, bronze medalist(s)	3rd place, bronze medalist(s)	-	-	-	-	-	-	-	8	5
Finland	-	X	-	9	2nd place, silver medalist(s)	1st place, gold medalist(s)	X	5	7	1st place, gold medalist(s)	9	-	-	9
France	-	-	-	-	-	-	-	-	-	-	-	-	7	1
Germany	-	-	-	-	X	7	7	10	-	-	6	9	-	6
Great Britain	-	X	-	-	-	10	12	-	-	12	-	-	-	4
Greece	-	-	-	-	-	-	-	12	-	-	-	-	-	1
Hungary	-	-	-	4	10	8	8	7	-	-	-	-	-	5
Iran	-	-	-	X	-	-	-	-	9	5	-	-	5	4
Israel	X	X	-	7	7	-	-	-	-	-	7	-	-	5
Italy	-	-	-	8	1st place, gold medalist(s)	X	-	-	-	-	-	-	-	3
Japan	-	-	-	-	-	-	-	-	-	-	-	5	1st place, gold medalist(s)	2
Lithuania	-	-	-	-	-	-	2nd place, silver medalist(s)	9	2nd place, silver medalist(s)	4	1st place, gold medalist(s)	3rd place, bronze medalist(s)	-	6
Netherlands	-	3rd place, bronze medalist(s)	-	12	-	9	-	-	-	-	-	-	-	3
Slovenia	-	-	-	-	-	X	X	11	8	-	-	-	-	4
South Korea	-	-	-	X	-	-	-	8	-	11	-	-	-	3
Spain	-	-	-	-	9	3rd place, bronze medalist(s)	4	6	12	-	-	-	-	5
Sweden	X	-	-	-	-	-	3rd place, bronze medalist(s)	2nd place, silver medalist(s)	3rd place, bronze medalist(s)	9	4	-	-	6
Turkey	-	-	-	-	-	-	-	-	-	3rd place, bronze medalist(s)	5	8	-	3
Ukraine	-	-	-	-	-	-	-	-	-	-	-	7	2nd place, silver medalist(s)	2
Unified Team	-	-	-	-	8	-	-	-	-	-	-	-	-	1
United States	X	2nd place, silver medalist(s)	1st place, gold medalist(s)	2nd place, silver medalist(s)	4	11	11	3rd place, bronze medalist(s)	4	-	2nd place, silver medalist(s)	4	6	11
West Germany	2nd place, silver medalist(s)	1st place, gold medalist(s)	X	X	-	-	-	-	-	-	-	-	-	4
Yugoslavia	-	X	3rd place, bronze medalist(s)	1st place, gold medalist(s)	-	-	-	-	-	-	-	-	-	3

=== Women ===
Nation	1984	1988	1992	1996	2000	2004	2008	2012	2016	2020	2024	Years
Algeria	-	-	-	-	-	-	-	-	10	(Note: Algeria qualified but withdrew in April 2021, and Egypt was offered the slot.)	-	1
Australia	-	X	X	X	X	-	-	9	9	8	-	7
Brazil	-	-	-	-	-	X	X	7	4	4	4	6
Canada	2nd place, silver medalist(s)	3rd place, bronze medalist(s)	3rd place, bronze medalist(s)	-	1st place, gold medalist(s)	1st place, gold medalist(s)	X	5	6	9	5	10
China	-	-	-	-	-	-	2nd place, silver medalist(s)	2nd place, silver medalist(s)	2nd place, silver medalist(s)	5	3rd place, bronze medalist(s)	5
Denmark	3rd place, bronze medalist(s)	1st place, gold medalist(s)	2nd place, silver medalist(s)	X	-	X	3rd place, bronze medalist(s)	10	-	-	-	7
Egypt	-	-	-	-	-	-	-	-	-	10	-	1
Finland	-	-	1st place, gold medalist(s)	2nd place, silver medalist(s)	4	4	-	4	-	-	-	5
France	-	-	-	-	-	-	-	-	-	-	8	1
Germany	-	X	X	1st place, gold medalist(s)	-	X	X	-	-	-	-	4
Great Britain	-	-	-	-	X	-	-	6	-	-	-	2
Greece	-	-	-	-	-	X	-	-	-	-	-	1
Israel	-	-	-	-	-	-	-	-	7	6	2nd place, silver medalist(s)	3
Japan	-	-	-	-	-	3rd place, bronze medalist(s)	X	1st place, gold medalist(s)	5	3rd place, bronze medalist(s)	6	6
Netherlands	-	4	-	-	X	X	-	-	-	-	-	3
RPC	-	-	-	-	-	-	-	-	-	7 (Note: Whilst the Russian women's team has qualified, it is required to compete as the Russia Paralympic Committee (RPC).)	-	
South Korea	-	X	-	X	X	-	-	-	-	-	7	4
Spain	-	-	X	4	2nd place, silver medalist(s)	-	-	-	-	-	-	3
Sweden	-	-	4	X	3rd place, bronze medalist(s)	-	4	3rd place, bronze medalist(s)	-	-	-	5
Turkey	-	-	-	-	-	-	-	-	1st place, gold medalist(s)	1st place, gold medalist(s)	1st place, gold medalist(s)	3
Ukraine	-	-	-	-	-	-	-	-	8	-	-	1
United States	1st place, gold medalist(s)	2nd place, silver medalist(s)	X	3rd place, bronze medalist(s)	X	2nd place, silver medalist(s)	1st place, gold medalist(s)	8	3rd place, bronze medalist(s)	2nd place, silver medalist(s)	-	10

== See also ==
- International Blind Sports Federation
- World Goalball Championships
