= Haruka Wakasugi =

Japanese goalball athlete

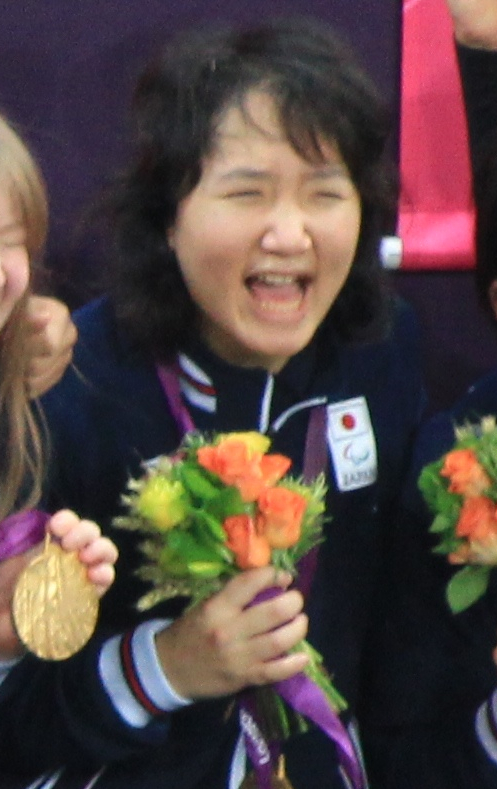
- Wakasugi after winning the gold medal at the 2012 Summer Paralympics

Personal information
- Born: 23 August 1995 (age 30) Ōme, Tokyo, Japan
- Education: Rikkyo University
- Height: 164 cm (5 ft 5 in)
- Weight: 60 kg (132 lb)

Sport
- Sport: Women's goalball
- Disability class: B1(formerly B2)
Medal record
Representing Japan
Paralympic Games
| Gold medal – first place | 2012 London | Team |
| Bronze medal – third place | 2020 Tokyo | Team |
Asian Para Games
| Gold medal – first place | 2018 Jakarta | Team |
| Bronze medal – third place | 2014 Incheon | Team |

Haruka Wakasugi (若杉 遥, Wakasugi Haruka; born 23 August 1995) is a Japanese goalball player who won a gold medal at the 2012 Summer Paralympics.

She was 13 years old when she developed fibrous dysplasia which led to vision loss. She began playing goalball in 2010 at age 15.
