= Sweden women's national goalball team =

Swedish national team, for the Paralympic sport of goalball

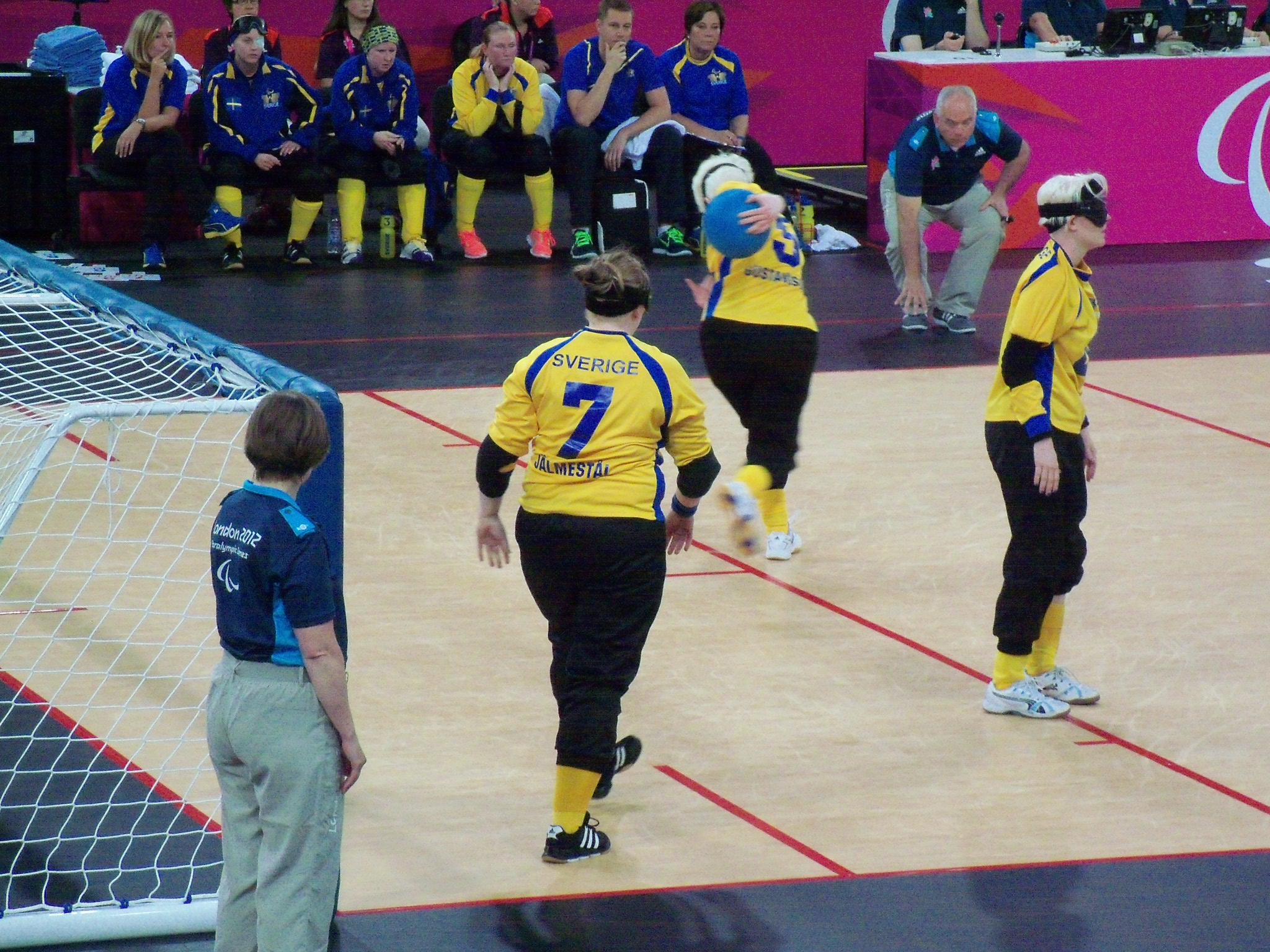
- Swedish women's goalball team throwing, Copper Box, London Paralympic Games (September 2012)
- Sport: Goalball
- League: IBSA
- Division: Women
- Region: IBSA Europe
- Location: Sweden
- Colours: Blue, yellow
- Championships: Paralympic Games medals: : 0: 0: 2 World Championship medals: : 0: 1: 2
- Parent group: Svenska parasportförbundet
- Website: www.parasport.se

Sweden women's national goalball team is the women's national team of Sweden. Goalball is a team sport designed specifically for athletes with a vision impairment. The team takes part in international goalball competitions.

Since 2018 Sweden has not had a women's national team. The team did make an appearance at the 2025 Pajulahti games in Finland.

== Paralympic Games ==
=== 1992 Barcelona ===
The team competed in the 1992 Summer Paralympics, from 3 to 14 September 1992, in the Pavelló de la Vall d'Hebron indoor stadium, Barcelona, Spain. They finished fourth.

=== 1996 Atlanta ===
The team competed in the 1996 Summer Paralympics, from 16 to 25 August 1996, in the GSU Sports Arena building, Atlanta, Georgia, United States of America. The team finished fifth.

=== 2000 Sydney ===
The team competed in the 2000 Summer Paralympics, between 18 and 29 October 2000, at an Olympic Park indoor hall, Sydney, New South Wales, Australia. They finished third.

=== 2008 Beijing ===
The team competed in 2008 Summer Paralympics, from 6 to 17 September 2008, in the Beijing Institute of Technology Gymnasium 'bat wing' arena, Beijing, China. There were 12 men's teams and 8 women's teams taking part in this sport.

=== 2012 London ===
The team competed in the 2012 Summer Paralympics from 30 August to 7 September 2012, in the Copper Box Arena, London, England. In Group B, they came third, before going into the quarter-finals where they defeated Great Britain 2:1. They lost to Japan in the semi-finals, 3:4, to take the bronze medal.

The following is the Sweden roster in the women's goalball tournament of the 2012 Summer Paralympics.

No.	Player	Age
2	Viktoria Andersson	27
3	Sofia Naesström	33
4	Anna Dahlberg	32
5	Malin Gustavsson	41
6	Maria Wåglund	28
7	Josefine Jälmestål	34

30 August 2012; 21:00	United States	5 – 1	Sweden	Copper Box, London; Referees: Yasser Oman (EGY), Warrick Jackes (AUS)
30 August 2012; 21:00	Armbruster 3 Czechowski 1 Miller 1	Report	Jälmestål 1	Copper Box, London; Referees: Yasser Oman (EGY), Warrick Jackes (AUS)

1 September 2012; 13:45	Canada	1 – 2	Sweden	Copper Box, London; Referees: Bulent Kimyor (TUR), Thomas Bärz (GER)
1 September 2012; 13:45	Kneebone 1	Report	Gustavsson 2	Copper Box, London; Referees: Bulent Kimyor (TUR), Thomas Bärz (GER)

2 September 2012; 11:30	Sweden	0 – 0	Japan	Copper Box, London; Referees: Tony Collonny (USA), Christl Däntler (GER)
2 September 2012; 11:30		Report		Copper Box, London; Referees: Tony Collonny (USA), Christl Däntler (GER)

4 September 2012; 12:30	Sweden	8 – 5	Australia	Copper Box, London; Referees: Hooshang Shariati (IRI), Janne Ahokas (FIN)
4 September 2012; 12:30	Gustavsson 5 Naesström 2 Jälmestål 1	Report	Esdaile 3 Christensen 2	Copper Box, London; Referees: Hooshang Shariati (IRI), Janne Ahokas (FIN)

Quarter-finals

5 September 2012; 12:45	Great Britain	1 – 2	Sweden	Copper Box, London; Referees: Carla Da Matta (BRA), Thomas Baerz (GER)
5 September 2012; 12:45	Sharkey 1	Report	Gustavsson 2	Copper Box, London; Referees: Carla Da Matta (BRA), Thomas Baerz (GER)

Semi-finals

6 September 2012; 15:00	Sweden	3 – 4 (a.e.t.)	Japan	Copper Box, London; Referees: Dina Murdie (GBR), Launel Scott (CAN)
6 September 2012; 15:00	Gustavsson 1 Jälmestål 1 Wåglund 1	Report	Komiya 2 Adachi 1 Urata 1	Copper Box, London; Referees: Dina Murdie (GBR), Launel Scott (CAN)

Finals

7 September 2012; 13:30	Finland	1 – 5	Sweden	Copper Box, London; Referees: Carla Da Matta (BRA), Kimberly Anderson (USA)
7 September 2012; 13:30	Heikkinen 1	Report	Naesström 2 Gustavsson 2 Jälmestål 1	Copper Box, London; Referees: Carla Da Matta (BRA), Kimberly Anderson (USA)

== World championships ==
=== 1994 Colorado Springs ===
The team competed in the 1994 World Championships, in Colorado Springs, Colorado, United States of America. The team was one of nine teams participating, and they finished third overall.

=== 1998 Madrid ===
The team competed in the 1998 World Championships, in Madrid, Spain. The team was one of eleven teams participating, and they finished second overall.

=== 2002 Rio de Janeiro ===
The team competed in the 2002 World Championships, in Rio de Janeiro, Brazil, from 30 August 2002 to 8 September 2002. The team was one of ten teams participating, and they finished fifth overall.

=== 2014 Espoo ===
The team competed in the 2014 World Championships from 30 June to 5 July 2014, in Espoo, Finland. In Pool Y, the team lost to Ukraine 2:6, Brazil 2:7, Israel 6:11, Australia 1:4, but beat China 7:2.

=== 2018 Malmö ===
As the host nation, the team competed in the 2018 World Championships from 3 to 8 June 2018, in Baltiska Hallen, Malmö, Sweden. They placed sixth in Pool C, and twelfth in overall final standings.

== IBSA World Games ==
=== 2003 Quebec City ===
The team competed in the 2003 IBSA World Games from 1 to 10 April 2011, in Quebec City, Canada. Ten teams competed. The first stage was pool play with five teams per pool and the top two teams in each pool advancing to the next round.

=== 2007 São Paulo ===
The team competed in the 2003 IBSA World Games, from 28 July 2007 to 8 August 2007, in São Paulo, Brazil. The women's goalball competition included thirteen teams, including this one. The competition was a 2008 Summer Paralympics qualifying event. Malin Gustausson finished second in the competition in scoring with 26 points. Josefine Jálmestal was seventh in the competition in scoring with 13 points.

== Regional championships ==
The team competes in the IBSA Europe goalball region. Groups A and C are held one year, and Group B the following year. Strong teams move towards Group A.

=== 2005 Neerpelt ===
The team competed in the 2015 IBSA European Regional Championships, from 15 to 23 October 2005, in Neerpelt and Overpelt, Belgium. Organised by the Vlaamse Liga Gehandicaptensport vzw (Flemish Sport Federation for Persons with a Disability), it hosted the men's Groups A and B (Belgium, Czech Republic, Denmark, Finland, Germany, Great Britain, Hungary, Italy, Lithuania, Slovakia, Slovenia, Spain, Sweden, and Ukraine), and the women division (Belarus, Denmark, Finland, Germany, Great Britain, Greece, Netherlands, Spain, Sweden, and Ukraine). Games were held in the Provinciaal Domein Dommelhof Sport in Neerpelt, and Sportcentrum De Bemvoort in Overpelt.

With ten teams competing, the team finished seventh.

=== 2007 Antalya ===
The team competed at the 2007 IBSA Goalball European Championships, hosted by the Turkish Blind Sports Federation, in Antalya, Turkey with 11 teams contesting the women's competition. The team finished sixth.

=== 2009 Munich (Group A) ===
The team competed at the 2009 European Championships, in Munich, Germany, with eleven teams taking part. Sweden finished fifth.

=== 2013 Konya (Group A) ===
The team competed in the 2013 IBSA Goalball European Championships, Group A, from 1 to 11 November 2013, at Konya, Turkey, where they finished tenth.

=== 2015 Kaunas (Group A) ===
The team competed in the 2015 IBSA Goalball European A Championships in Kaunas, Lithuania. They lost to Turkey, 0:5 in the quarter-finals.

=== 2017 Pajulahti (Group A) ===
The team competed in the 2017 IBSA Goalball European A Championships from 15 to 23 September 2017, at Pajulahti, Nastola, Finland. Athletes included Viktoria Andersson, Rebekka Krebs, Lisa Ly, and Maria Wåglund.

They ranked tenth in the final standings.

== Competitive history ==
The table below contains individual game results for the team in international matches and competitions.

Year	Event	Opponent	Date	Venue	Team	Team	Winner	Ref
2003	IBSA World Championships and Games	Turkey	7 August	Quebec City, Canada	10	0	Sweden	
2003	IBSA World Championships and Games	Finland	7 August	Quebec City, Canada	2	1	Finland	
2003	IBSA World Championships and Games	Japan	7 August	Quebec City, Canada	1	0	Japan	
2003	IBSA World Championships and Games	South Korea	7 August	Quebec City, Canada	2	3	Sweden	
2007	IBSA Goalball European Championships	Finland	25 April	OHEP Koleji Spor Salonu, Anyalya, Turkey	2	5	Finland	
2007	IBSA Goalball European Championships	Greece	25 April	OHEP Koleji Spor Salonu, Anyalya, Turkey	2	1	Sweden	
2007	IBSA Goalball European Championships	Denmark	26 April	OHEP Koleji Spor Salonu, Anyalya, Turkey	5	0	Denmark	
2007	IBSA Goalball European Championships	Russia	26 April	OHEP Koleji Spor Salonu, Anyalya, Turkey	11	1	Sweden	
2007	IBSA Goalball European Championships	Germany	27 April	OHEP Koleji Spor Salonu, Anyalya, Turkey	4	3	Germany	
2007	IBSA World Championships and Games	Germany	31 July	Brazil	6	5	Germany	
2007	IBSA World Championships and Games	Great Britain	1 August	Brazil	1	3	Sweden	
2007	IBSA World Championships and Games	Iran	1 August	Brazil	10	1	Sweden	
2007	IBSA World Championships and Games	Finland	2 August	Brazil	6	3	Sweden	
2007	IBSA World Championships and Games	Greece	3 August	Brazil	6	3	Greece	
2007	IBSA World Championships and Games	Italy	4 August	Brazil	0	10	Sweden	
2007	IBSA World Championships and Games	Ukraine	5 August	Brazil	6	5	Sweden	
2007	IBSA World Championships and Games	Brazil	5 August	Brazil	5	6	Sweden	
2007	IBSA World Championships and Games	Germany	6 August	Brazil	6	3	Germany	
2009	IBSA Goalball European Championships	Greece	25 August	Munich, Germany	1	1		
2009	IBSA Goalball European Championships	Denmark	25 August	Munich, Germany	4	5	Sweden	
2009	IBSA Goalball European Championships	Ukraine	26 August	Munich, Germany	0	7	Sweden	
2009	IBSA Goalball European Championships	Russia	26 August	Munich, Germany	5	4	Russia	
2009	IBSA Goalball European Championships	Finland	28 August	Munich, Germany	7	3	Finland	
2009	IBSA Goalball European Championships	Israel	29 August	Munich, Germany	6	2	Sweden	
2013	IBSA Goalball European Championships	Great Britain	1–6 November	Konya, Turkey	4	9	Great Britain	
2013	IBSA Goalball European Championships	Finland	1–6 November	Konya, Turkey	2	8	Finland	
2013	IBSA Goalball European Championships	Russia	1–6 November	Konya, Turkey	1	11	Russia	
2013	IBSA Goalball European Championships	Ukraine	1–6 November	Konya, Turkey	3	9	Ukraine	
2013	IBSA Goalball European Championships	Denmark	7 November	Konya, Turkey	3	6	Denmark	

=== Goal scoring by competition ===
Player	Goals	Competition	Notes	Ref
Malin Gustausson	26	2007 IBSA World Championships and Games		
Josefine Jálmestal	13	2007 IBSA World Championships and Games		
Josefine Jálmestal	8	2009 IBSA Goalball European Championships		
Asa Alverstedt	6	2007 IBSA World Championships and Games		
Sofia Naesstrom	5	2009 IBSA Goalball European Championships		
Sofia Naesstrom	4	2007 IBSA World Championships and Games		
Maria Juliusson	3	2009 IBSA Goalball European Championships		
Maria Juliasson	3	2007 IBSA World Championships and Games		
Asa Alverstedt	3	2009 IBSA Goalball European Championships		
Anna Dahlberg	3	2009 IBSA Goalball European Championships		

== See also ==
- Disabled sports
- Sweden at the Paralympics
