= Eiko Kakehata =

Japanese goalball player (born 1993)

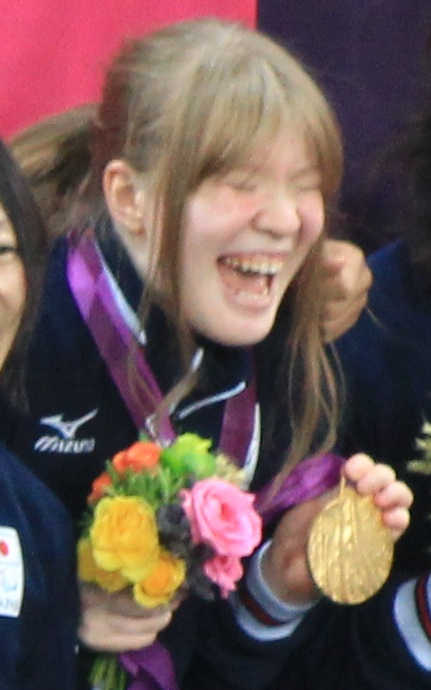
- Kakehata after winning the gold medal at the 2012 Summer Paralympics

Personal information
- Born: February 19, 1993 (age 33) Yokohama, Kanagawa, Japan
- Height: 165 cm (5 ft 5 in)
- Weight: 66 kg (146 lb)

Sport
- Sport: Women's goalball
- Disability class: B3
Medal record
Representing Japan
Paralympic Games
Gold medal – first place	2012 London	Team
Bronze medal – third place	2020 Tokyo	Team
Asian Para Games
Gold medal – first place	2018 Jakarta	Team
Bronze medal – third place	2014 Incheon	Team

Eiko Kakehata (欠端 瑛子, Kakehata Eiko; born 19 February 1993) is a Japanese goalball player who won a gold medal at the 2012 Summer Paralympics.

She has albinism which caused her visual impairment. She started playing goalball when she was 16. Her father Mitsunori Kakehata (欠端光則) played professional baseball for the Yokohama Taiyo Whales (now Yokohama DeNA BayStars).
