= Goalball at the 2020 Summer Paralympics =

Goalball at the XVI Paralympic Games
- Goalball pictogram of the 2020 Summer Paralympics
- Venue: Makuhari Messe, Hall C
- Dates: 25 August – 3 September 2021
- Competitors: 120 from 14 nations

Goalball at the 2020 Summer Paralympics was held in the Makuhari Messe in Tokyo. The event was held from 25 August to 3 September 2021.

The 2020 Summer Olympic and Paralympic Games were postponed to 2021 due to the COVID-19 pandemic. They kept the 2020 name and were held from 24 August to 5 September 2021.

== Discussions ==
On 17 December 2020 the Court of Arbitration for Sport (CAS) decision involving the World Anti-Doping Agency and Russia's participation determined those athletes not implicated in doping or covering up positive tests may still be allowed to compete, but not under the Russian Federation flag. The Russian women's team, who secured a Paralympic Games position through first place in the women's category of the 2018 World Championships, who may otherwise have competed as a 'neutral team', is known as the 'Russian Paralympic Committee' (RPC).

On the eve of the draw of Wednesday 21 April 2021 to determine which teams are assigned to competition pools, the draw was postponed '[f]ollowing notification of a late withdrawal of one of the women’s teams from the Tokyo 2020 Paralympic Games'. It was announced on Friday 23 April 2021 (European or American time zone) the International Paralympic Committee by virtue of the Tokyo 2020 Paralympic Games Qualification Regulations, following the withdrawal of the women's team from Algeria, Egypt received the slot.

== Qualifying ==
Both men's and women's tournaments qualified 10 teams each for the Games.

=== Men ===
Means of qualification	Date	Venue	Berths	Qualified
2018 IBSA Goalball World Championships	3–8 June 2018	(Sweden) Malmö	3	Belgium; Brazil; Germany
2019 IBSA Goalball Paralympic Ranking Tournament	29 June – 9 July 2019	(United States) Fort Wayne	2	Turkey; Lithuania
2019 Parapan American Games	23 August – 1 September 2019	(Peru) Lima	1	United States
2019 European Championships	5–14 October 2019	(Germany) Rostock	1	Ukraine
2019 Asia/Pacific Championships	5–11 December 2019	(Japan) Tokyo	1	China
2020 African Championships	28 February – 6 March 2020	(Egypt) Port Said	1	Algeria (Note: Regulation 47 of the IBSA Goalball Rules and Regulations 2018–2020 requires in part, 'Tournaments must have a minimum of four participating countries to qualify as a Regional Championship tournament'. Regulations 42 and 54 to vary the regulations was not exercised outside of the minimum sixty day publication period. The IBSA Africa regional championship was therefore a regional tournament only. The same situation existed for the 2016 Summer Paralympics where the International Paralympic Committee promoted Algeria for male and female teams regardless of the rules.)
Host country allocation	7 September 2013	(Argentina) Buenos Aires	1	Japan
Total			10	

=== Women ===
Means of qualification	Date	Venue	Berths	Qualified
Host country allocation	7 September 2013	(Argentina) Buenos Aires	1	Japan
2018 IBSA Goalball World Championships	3–8 June 2018	(Sweden) Malmö	3	Brazil; Russia (Note: Following the post-WADA responses, the Russian women's team will be listed as Russian Paralympic Committee (RPC), not Russia (RUS).); Turkey
2019 IBSA Goalball Paralympic Ranking Tournament	29 June – 9 July 2019	(United States) Fort Wayne	2	Australia; Canada
2019 Parapan American Games	23 August – 1 September 2019	(Peru) Lima	1	United States
2019 European Championships	5–14 October 2019	(Germany) Rostock	1	Israel
2019 Asia/Pacific Championships	5–11 December 2019	(Japan) Tokyo	1	China
2020 African Championships	28 February – 6 March 2020	(Egypt) Port Said	1	Egypt (Note: Whilst the Algerian women's team qualified, they withdrew by 21 April 2021, and IPC redistributed the slot to Egypt.)
Total			10	

== Schedule ==
G	Group stage	¼	Quarter-finals	½	Semi-finals	B	Bronze medal match	F	Final

Date Event	Wed 25 Aug	Thu 26 Aug	Fri 27 Aug	Sat 28 Aug	Sun 29 Aug	Mon 30 Aug	Tue 31 Aug	Wed 1 Sep	Thu 2 Sep	Fri 3 Sep		Sat 4 Sep	Sun 5 Sep
Men	G	G	G	G	G	G	¼		½	B	F		
Women	G	G	G	G	G	G		¼	½	B	F		

== Men's tournament ==
=== Competition format ===
The ten men's teams were divided into two equal groups for a single round robin group stage. The top four teams of each group advanced to the quarter finals. All matches in the second stage were knock-out format.

=== Group stage ===
==== Group A ====
Pos	Team	Pld	W	D	L	GF	GA	GD	Pts	Qualification
1	Japan (H)	4	3	0	1	37	15	+22	9	Quarter-finals
2	Brazil	4	3	0	1	35	17	+18	9	Quarter-finals
3	United States	4	2	0	2	25	35	−10	6	Quarter-finals
4	Lithuania	4	1	1	2	24	31	−7	4	Quarter-finals
5	Algeria	4	0	1	3	20	43	−23	1	

Source: TOCOG
(H) Hosts

==== Group B ====
Pos	Team	Pld	W	D	L	GF	GA	GD	Pts	Qualification
1	Belgium	4	2	0	2	18	13	+5	6	Quarter-finals
2	Ukraine	4	2	0	2	18	15	+3	6	Quarter-finals
3	Turkey	4	2	0	2	15	15	0	6	Quarter-finals
4	China	4	2	0	2	21	22	−1	6	Quarter-finals
5	Germany	4	2	0	2	16	23	−7	6	

Source: TOCOG

=== Finals ===
Quarter-finals
31 August
Japan	4
China	7
31 August
Ukraine	4
United States	5
31 August
Belgium	4
Lithuania	7
31 August
Brazil	9
Turkey	4

Semi-finals
2 September
China	8
United States	1
2 September
Lithuania	5
Brazil	9

Gold medal match
3 September
China	2
Brazil	7
Bronze medal match
3 September
United States	7
Lithuania	10

== Women's tournament ==
=== Competition format ===
The ten women's teams were divided into two equal groups for a single round robin group stage. The top four teams of each group advanced to the quarter finals. All matches in the second stage were knock-out format.

=== Group stage ===
==== Group C ====
Pos	Team	Pld	W	D	L	GF	GA	GD	Pts	Qualification
1	China	4	3	0	1	17	7	+10	9	Quarterfinals
2	Israel	4	2	0	2	22	14	+8	6	Quarterfinals
3	RPC	4	2	0	2	13	16	−3	6	Quarterfinals
4	Australia	4	2	0	2	9	21	−12	6	Quarterfinals
5	Canada	4	1	0	3	12	15	−3	3	

Source: TOCOG
Rules for classification: 1) points; 2) goal difference; 3) number of wins; 4) goals against; 5) head-to-head goal difference.

==== Group D ====
Pos	Team	Pld	W	D	L	GF	GA	GD	Pts	Qualification
1	Turkey	4	3	0	1	30	11	+19	9	Quarterfinals
2	United States	4	3	0	1	22	10	+12	9	Quarterfinals
3	Japan (H)	4	2	1	1	18	13	+5	7	Quarterfinals
4	Brazil	4	1	1	2	23	19	+4	4	Quarterfinals
5	Egypt	4	0	0	4	3	43	−40	0	

Source: TOCOG
Rules for classification: 1) points; 2) goal difference; 3) number of wins; 4) goals against; 5) head-to-head goal difference.
(H) Hosts

=== Finals ===
Quarterfinals
1 September
China	0
Brazil (2OT)	1
1 September
United States	5
RPC	3
1 September
Turkey	10
Australia	6
1 September
Israel	1
Japan	4

Semifinals
2 September
Brazil	4
United States (ET)	5
2 September
Turkey	8
Japan	5

Gold medal match
3 September
United States	2
Turkey	9
Bronze medal match
3 September
Brazil	1
Japan	6

== Medalists ==
Event	Gold	Silver	Bronze
Men's goalball	Brazil (BRA); Emerson Ernesto; Alex de Melo; José Roberto de Oliveira; Romário Marques; Leomon Moreno; Josemárcio Sousa	China (CHN); Cai Changgui; Chen Liangliang; Hu Mingyao; Lai Liangyu; Yang Mingyuan; Yu Qinquan	Lithuania (LTU); Mantas Brazauskis; Artūras Jonikaitis; Nerijus Montvydas; Genrik Pavliukianec; Justas Pažarauskas; Marius Zibolis
Women's goalball	Turkey (TUR); Sevda Altunoluk; Sevtap Altunoluk; Kader Çelik; Fatma Gül Güler; Şeydanur Kaplan; Reyhan Yılmaz	United States (USA); Mindy Cook; Lisa Czechowski; Amanda Dennis; Marybai Huking; Eliana Mason; Asya Miller	Japan (JPN); Norika Hagiwara; Eiko Kakehata; Rieko Takahashi; Yuki Temma; Rie Urata; Haruka Wakasugi

== See also ==
- Goalball at the 2020 Summer Paralympics – Men's tournament game details
- Goalball at the 2020 Summer Paralympics – Women's tournament game details
