= Masae Komiya =

Japanese goalball player

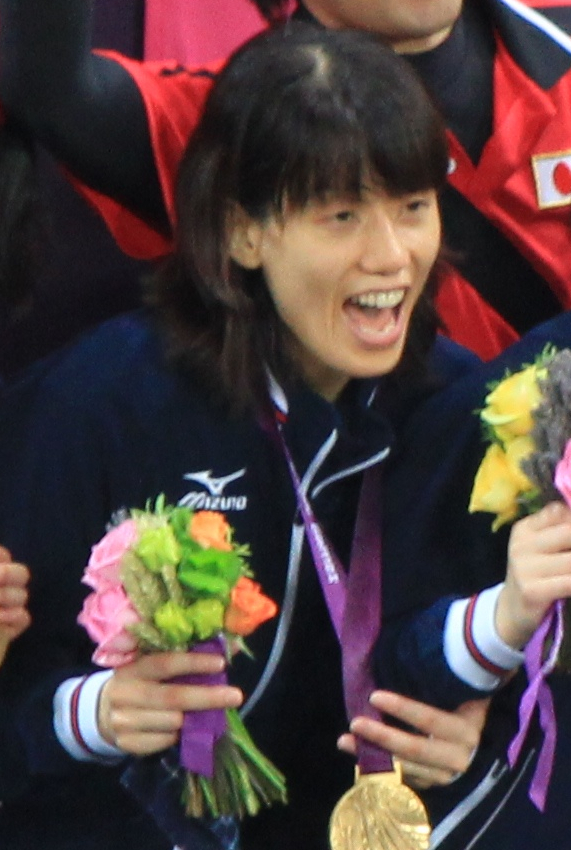
- Komiya after winning the gold medal at the 2012 Summer Paralympics

Personal information
- Born: May 8, 1975 (age 51) Fukuoka Prefecture, Japan
- Education: Kyushu Sangyo University
- Height: 167 cm (5 ft 6 in)
- Weight: 57 kg (126 lb)

Sport
- Sport: Women's goalball
- Disability class: B1 (formerly B2)
Medal record
Representing Japan
Paralympic Games
Gold medal – first place	2012 London	Team
Bronze medal – third place	2004 Athens	Team
Asian Para Games
Gold medal – first place	2018 Jakarta	Team
Silver medal – second place	2010 Guangzhou	Team

Masae Komiya (小宮 正江, Komiya Masae; born 8 May 1975) is a Japanese goalball player with a congenital visual impairment. She was part of the bronze medal-winning Japanese women's team at the 2004 Summer Paralympics. At the 2012 Summer Paralympics she captained the gold medal-winning Japanese women's team. After the game she stated "The day [we waited for] finally came. I was so overcome with emotion that I couldn't finish singing the 'Kimigayo' national anthem."

Her impairment was caused by retinitis pigmentosa, which destroyed her vision in both eyes when she was in primary school. She began playing in 2001. Her coach, Naoki Eguro, introduced her to the sport.
