= Akiko Adachi =

Japanese goalball player

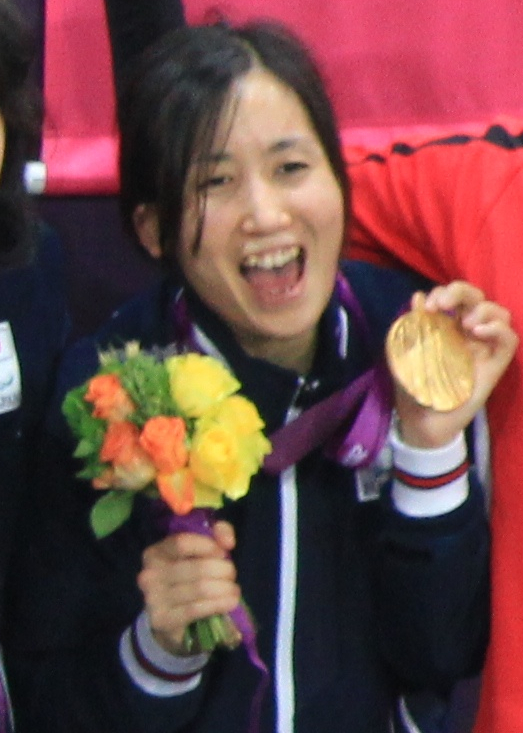
- Adachi after winning the gold medal at the 2012 Summer Paralympics

Personal information
- Born: September 10, 1983 (age 42) Yame, Fukuoka, Japan
- Height: 160 cm (5 ft 3 in)
- Weight: 55 kg (121 lb)

Sport
- Sport: Women's goalball
- Disability class: B2
Medal record
Representing Japan
Paralympic Games
Gold medal – first place	2012 London	Team
Asian Para Games
Silver medal – second place	2010 Guangzhou	Team
Bronze medal – third place	2014 Incheon	Team

Akiko Adachi (安達 阿記子, Adachi Akiko; born 10 September 1983) is a Japanese goalball player who won a gold medal at the 2012 Summer Paralympics. She scored the game-winning goal in the final against China.

She was diagnosed with macular degeneration in her right eye when she was 14 years old. When she was 20, a visual condition also developed in her left eye, causing impairment. She began playing goalball in 2006, at age 23.
