= Anna Sharkey =

British goalball player (born 1987)

Anna Tipton
Personal information
- Full name: Anna Louise Tipton
- Born: Anna Louise Sharkey; 1987 (age 38–39) High Wycombe, England, Great Britain
- Home town: Southend, England, Great Britain

Sport
- Country: Great Britain
- Sport: Goalball
- Disability: Retinitis pigmentosa
Medal record
Goalball
Representing Great Britain
IBSA European Goalball Championships
Gold medal – first place	2009 Munich	Women's tournament

Anna Louise Tipton (née Sharkey, born 1987) is a former British goalball player who competed at international level events. She is the younger sister of goalball player Michael Sharkey, they both played for Great Britain at the 2012 Summer Paralympics.
