= Japan at the 2024 Summer Paralympics =

- Flag of Japan
- IPC code: JPN
- NPC: Japan Paralympic Committee

in Paris, France August 28, 2024 – September 8, 2024
- Competitors: 176 in 21 sports
- Flag bearers: Daiki Ishiyama; An Nishida
- Medals Ranked 10th: Gold 14 Silver 10 Bronze 17 Total 41

Summer Paralympics appearances (overview)
- 1964; 1968; 1972; 1976; 1980; 1984; 1988; 1992; 1996; 2000; 2004; 2008; 2012; 2016; 2020; 2024

Japan competed at the 2024 Summer Paralympics in Paris, France, from 28 August to 8 September.

== Medalists ==
Medal	Name	Sport	Event	Date
Gold	Takayuki Suzuki	Swimming	Men's 50 metre breaststroke SB3	29 August
Gold	Keiichi Kimura	Swimming	Men's 50 metre freestyle S11	31 August
Gold	Sarina Satomi	Badminton	Women's singles WH1	2 September
Gold	Japan national wheelchair rugby team: Daisuke Ikezaki; Ryuji Kusaba; Yukinobu Ike; Hitoshi Ogawa; Hidefumi Wakayama; Yuki Hasegawa; Kae Kurahashi; Masayuki Haga; Shinichi Shimakawa; Shunya Nakamachi; Seiya Norimatsu; Katsuya Hashimoto	Wheelchair rugby	Mixed tournament	2 September
Gold	Daiki Kajiwara	Badminton	Men's singles WH2	2 September
Gold	Yui Kamiji; Manami Tanaka	Wheelchair tennis	Women's doubles	5 September
Gold	Natsuki Wada	Table tennis	Women's individual C11	5 September
Gold	Japan men's national goalball team: Yuto Sano; Haruki Torii; Yuji Taguchi; Naoki Hagiwara; Kazuya Kaneko; Koji Miyajiki	Goalball	Men's tournament	5 September
Gold	Yui Kamiji	Wheelchair tennis	Women's singles	6 September
Gold	Junko Hirose	Judo	Women's 57 kg J2	6 September
Gold	Yujiro Seto	Judo	Men's 73 kg J2	6 September
Gold	Keiichi Kimura	Swimming	Men's 100 m butterfly S11	6 September
Gold	Keiko Sugiura	Cycling	Women's road race C1–3	7 September
Gold	Tokito Oda	Wheelchair tennis	Men's singles	7 September
Silver	Kenya Karasawa	Athletics	Men's 5000 metres T11	30 August
Silver	Takayuki Suzuki	Swimming	Men's 100 metre freestyle S4	30 August
Silver	Tomoki Sato	Athletics	Men's 400 metres T52	30 August
Silver	Kota Kubota	Swimming	Men's 100 metre backstroke S8	31 August
Silver	Sarina Satomi; Yuma Yamazaki	Badminton	Women's doubles WH1–WH2	1 September
Silver	Keiko Onidani	Athletics	Women's discus throw F53	2 September
Silver	Ryota Fukunaga	Athletics	Men's 400 metres T13	5 September
Silver	Shizuka Hangai	Judo	Women's 48 kg J1	5 September
Silver	Takuya Miki; Tokito Oda	Wheelchair tennis	Men's doubles	6 September
Silver	Takayuki Suzuki	Swimming	Men's 50 metre freestyle S4	6 September
Bronze	Uchu Tomita	Swimming	Men's 400 metre freestyle S11	30 August
Bronze	Tomoya Ito	Athletics	Men's 400 metres T52	30 August
Bronze	Mika Mizuta	Shooting	R5 Mixed 10 metre air rifle prone SH2	1 September
Bronze	Hiromi Endo	Boccia	Women's individual BC1	1 September
Bronze	Shuta Kawakami	Athletics	Men's 100 metres T13	1 September
Bronze	Hiroshi Murayama; Daiki Kajiwara	Badminton	Men's doubles WH1–WH2	1 September
Bronze	Naohide Yamaguchi	Swimming	Men's 100 metre breaststroke SB14	2 September
Bronze	Takayuki Suzuki	Swimming	Men's 200 metre freestyle S4	3 September
Bronze	Ayano Tsujiuchi	Swimming	Women's 100 metre freestyle S12	4 September
Bronze	Aira Kinoshita	Swimming	Women's 200 metre individual medley SM14	4 September
Bronze	Hiromi Endo; Takayuki Hirose; Hidetaka Sugimura	Boccia	Mixed team BC1–2	5 September
Bronze	Kanami Furukawa	Table tennis	Women's individual C11	5 September
Bronze	Tomoki Sato	Athletics	Men's 100 metres T52	6 September
Bronze	Kazusa Ogawa	Judo	Women's 70 kg J2	6 September
Bronze	Uchu Tomita	Swimming	Men's 100 m butterfly S11	6 September
Bronze	Tomoki Suzuki	Athletics	Men's marathon T54	8 September
Bronze	Misato Michishita	Athletics	Women's marathon T12	8 September

== Competitors ==
The following is the list of number of competitors in the Games.

Sport	Men	Women	Total
Archery	2	0	2
Athletics	22	18	40
Badminton	6	6	12
Boccia	4	3	7
Cycling	2	1	3
Equestrian	2	0	2
Football 5-a-side	10	0	10
Goalball	6	6	12
Judo	2	4	6
Paracanoeing	1	3	4
Paratriathlon	3	1	4
Powerlifting	1	0	1
Rowing	1	0	1
Shooting	1	2	3
Swimming	12	10	22
Table tennis	6	3	9
Taekwondo	2	0	2
Wheelchair basketball	0	12	12
Wheelchair fencing	3	1	4
Wheelchair rugby	11	1	12
Wheelchair tennis	4	4	8
Total	101	75	176

== Archery ==
Japan secured a quota places in mixed recurve and men's compound event by virtue of their result at the 2023 World Para Archery Championships in Plzeň, Czech Republic and 2023 Asian Championships in Bangkok, Thailand.

Athlete	Event	Ranking Round		Round of 32	Round of 16	Quarterfinals	Semifinals	Finals	
Athlete	Event	Score	Seed	Opposition Score	Opposition Score	Opposition Score	Opposition Score	Opposition Score	Rank
Oe Yuya	Men's individual compound	682	23	Milne (AUS); L 142–147	Did not advance				=17
Tomohiro Ueyama	Men's individual recurve	599	22	Travisani (ITA); W 6–2	Ciszek (POL); L 3–7	Did not advance			=9

== Athletics ==
Japanese track and field athletes achieved quota places for the following events based on their results at the 2023 World Championships, 2024 World Championships, or through high performance allocation, as long as they meet the minimum entry standard (MES).

Key

- Note–Ranks given for track events are within the athlete's heat only
- Q = Qualified for the next round
- q = Qualified for the next round as a fastest loser or, in field events, by position without achieving the qualifying target
- DQ = Disqualified
- PR = Paralympic Record
- AR = Area (or continental) Record
- NR = National Record
- N/A = Round not applicable for the event
- Bye = Athlete not required to compete in round

Track & road events
Men

Athlete	Event	Heat		Final	
Athlete	Event	Result	Rank	Result	Rank
Shuta Kawakami	100 m T13	10.80	2 Q	10.80	3rd place, bronze medalist(s)
Tatsuya Ito	100 m T52	17.76	4 q	17.91	8
Tatsuya Ito	400 m T52	1:09.55	5	Did not advance	
Tomoya Ito	100 m T52	17.58	4 q	17.67	7
Tomoya Ito	400 m T52	1:00.42	2 Q	1:01.08	3rd place, bronze medalist(s)
Tomoki Sato	100 m T52	17.20	1 Q	17.44	3rd place, bronze medalist(s)
Tomoki Sato	400 m T52	58.04	1 Q	56.26	2nd place, silver medalist(s)
Tomoki Ikoma	100 m T54	14.73	5	Did not advance	
Kengo Oshima	100 m T64	11.24 NR	5	Did not advance	
Kengo Oshima	200 m T64	DNS	–	Did not advance	
Shunsuke Itani	200 m T64	23.67	4 q	23.50	7
Ryota Fukunaga	400 m T13	—N/a		48.07	2nd place, silver medalist(s)
Takeru Matsumoto	400 m T36	—N/a		53.63 NR	4
Kenya Karasawa	1500 m T11	4:06.86	3 q	4:04.40 NR	4
Kenya Karasawa	5000 m T11	—N/a		14:51.48 NR	2nd place, silver medalist(s)
Daiki Akai	1500 m T20	—N/a		3:57.58	5
Yuji Togawa	1500 m T20	—N/a		4:02.68	6
Tomoki Suzuki	1500 m T54	3:05.31	5 Q	2:53.99	7
Tomoki Suzuki	Marathon T54				
Shinya Wada	5000 m T11	—N/a		15:16.41	4
Shinya Wada	Marathon T12				
Tadashi Horikoshi	Marathon T12				
Yutaka Kumagai	Marathon T12				
Ryota Yoshida	Marathon T54				

Women

Athlete	Event	Heat		Final	
Athlete	Event	Result	Rank	Result	Rank
Uran Sawada	100 m T12	12.90	4	Did not advance	
Haruka Kitaura	100 m T34	19.68	4 q	19.81	7
Moe Onodera	100 m T34	19.08	3 Q	18.94	6
Moe Onodera	800 m T34	—N/a		2:15.85	6
Ayano Yoshida	100 m T34	20.43	5 q	20.07	8
Yuka Takamatsu	100 m T38	14.86	9	Did not advance	
Sae Tsuji	100 m T47	12.94	7	Did not advance	
Sae Tsuji	400 m T47	1:00.19	4 q	59.13	7
Kaede Maegawa	100 m T63	16.34	5	Did not advance	
Tomomi Tozawa	100 m T63	15.85	5	Did not advance	
Saki Takakuwa	100 m T64	13.85	6	Did not advance	
Mana Sasaki	400 m T13	58.77	3 Q	58.35	7
Moeko Yamamoto	1500 m T20	—N/a		5:16.70	9
Misato Michishita	Marathon T12	—N/a		3:04:23	3rd place, bronze medalist(s)
Tsubasa Kina	Marathon T54	—N/a		2:04:53	12
Wakako Tsuchida	Marathon T54	—N/a		1:52:39	6

Mixed

Athlete	Event	Heat		Final	
Athlete	Event	Result	Rank	Result	Rank
Takeru Matsumoto; Tomoki Ikoma; Uran Sawada; Sae Tsuji	4 × 100 m relay	47.09	2 q	48.16	4

Field events
Men

Athlete	Event	Final	
Athlete	Event	Distance	Position
Daiki Ishiyama	Long jump T12	6.75	5
Ryota Fukunaga	Long jump T13	6.55	7
Yamato Shimbo	Discus throw F37	51.37	4
Yuta Wakoh	Javelin throw F13	58.49	7
Shunya Takahashi	Javelin throw F46	59.76	6
Akihiro Yamazaki	Javelin throw F46	57.67	7

Women

Athlete	Event	Final	
Athlete	Event	Distance	Position
Uran Sawada	Long jump T12	4.90	6
Sonomi Sakai	Long jump T20	4.87	13
Kaede Maegawa	Long jump T63	4.50	6
Tomomi Tozawa	Long jump T63	4.58	5
Maya Nakanishi	Long jump T64	4.91	7
Saki Takakuwa	Long jump T64	5.04	5
Yukiko Saito	Shot put F46	11.61	4
Keiko Onidani	Discus throw F53	15.78 NR	2nd place, silver medalist(s)

== Badminton ==
Japan has qualified eleven para badminton players for the following events, through the release of BWF para-badminton Race to Paris Paralympic Ranking.

Men

Athlete	Event	Group Stage				Quarterfinal	Semifinal	Final / BM	
Athlete	Event	Opposition Score	Opposition Score	Opposition Score	Rank	Opposition Score	Opposition Score	Opposition Score	Rank
Hiroshi Murayama	Singles WH1	Nagashima (JPN); W 2–0 (21–8, 21–17)	Choi (KOR); L 0–2 (10–21, 13–21)	—N/a	2Q	Jeong (KOR); L 0–2 (26–28, 19–21)	Did not advance		
Osamu Nagashima	Singles WH1	Murayama (JPN); L 0–2 (8–21, 17–21)	Choi (KOR); L 0–2 (11–21, 14–21)	—N/a	3	Did not advance			
Daiki Kajiwara (1)	Singles WH2	Matsumoto (JPN); W 2–0 (21–4, 21–18)	Olgiati (SUI); W 2–0 (21–10, 21–10)	—N/a	1Q	—N/a	Kim (KOR); W 2–0 (21–17, 21–9)	Chan (HKG); W 2–0 (21–10, 21–10)	1st place, gold medalist(s)
Takumi Matsumoto	Singles WH2	Kajiwara (JPN); L 0–2 (4–21, 18–21)	Olgiati (SUI); W 2–0 (21–10, 21–15)	—N/a	2	Did not advance			
Daisuke Fujihara	Singles SL3	Chyrkov (UKR); W 2–1 (19–21, 21–16, 21–17)	Bethell (GBR); L 0–2 (9–21, 4–21)	Czyz (NZL); W 2–0 (21–8, 21–12)	2Q	—N/a	Nitesh (IND); L 0–2 (16–21, 12–21)	Bunsun (THA); L 0–2 (15–21, 15–21)	4
Taiyo Imai	Singles SU5	Anrimusthi (INA); L (18–21, 14–21)	Fang (TPE); W 2–1 (15–21, 21–11, 21–19)	Anuar (MAS); L 1–2 (21–17, 17–21, 17–21)	3	Did not advance			
Daiki Kajiwara; Hiroshi Murayama	Doubles WH1–2	Noorlan / Ramli (MAS); W (17–21, 21–13, 21–16)							
Takumi Matsumoto; Osamu Nagashima	Doubles WH1–2	Jakobs / Toupé (FRA); W 2-1							

Women

Athlete	Event	Group Stage				Semifinal	Final / BM	
Athlete	Event	Opposition Score	Opposition Score	Opposition Score	Rank	Opposition Score	Opposition Score	Rank
Sarina Satomi	Singles WH1	Yin (CHN); L 1-2	Gorodetzky (ISR)	Mathez (SUI)				
Yuma Yamazaki	Singles WH2	Liu (CHN)	Seçkin (TUR)	—N/a				
Noriko Ito	Singles SL3	Yıldız (TUR); L 0-2	Xiao (CHN)	Henpraiwan (THA)				
Fujino Haruka	Singles SL4	Seansupa (THA)	Sagøy (NOR)	—N/a				
Mamiko Toyoda	Singles SU5	Kameyama (JPN); W 2-0	Rosengren (DEN)	—N/a				
Kaede Kameyama	Singles SU5	Toyoda (JPN); L 0-2	Rosengren (DEN)	—N/a				
Sarina Satomi; Yuma Yamazaki	Doubles WH1–2	Jung G-o / Kwon H-a (KOR); W 2-0						

Mixed

Athlete	Event	Group Stage				Semifinal	Final / BM	
Athlete	Event	Opposition Score	Opposition Score	Opposition Score	Rank	Opposition Score	Opposition Score	Rank
Taiyo Imai; Noriko Ito	Doubles SL3–SU5	Setiawan / Sadiyah (INA); L (12–21, 23–25)						

== Boccia ==
Japan entered six athletes into the Paralympics games, after nominated top two individual athletes in men's individual BC4 events; top four in BC1/BC2 team events, through the final world ranking; and through winning the bronze medal in the mixed pairs event for BC3, at the 2024 Paralympic Qualification Tournament in Coimbra, Portugal.

Athlete	Event	Pool matches				Playoffs	Quarterfinals	Semifinals	Final / BM	
Athlete	Event	Opposition Score	Opposition Score	Opposition Score	Rank	Opposition Score	Opposition Score	Opposition Score	Opposition Score	Rank
Takayuki Hirose	Men's individual BC2	Allard (CAN); W 6–2	Yan (CHN); L 0–17	Yudha (INA); L 2–5	3	Did not advance				18
Hidetaka Sugimura	Men's individual BC2	Lan (CHN); W 5–0	Lee (MAS); W 6–5	Herlangga (INA); L 2–3	2 Q	Yan (CHN); W 5–2	Saengampa (THA); L 3–5	Did not advance		8
Masayuki Arita	Men's individual BC3	Carvalho (BRA); W 5–4	Polychronidis (GRE); L 0–9	Menard (FRA); L 2–4	3	—N/a	Did not advance			12
Shunsuke Uchida	Men's individual BC4	Zheng (CHN); L 1–10	Costa (BRA); W 8–2	Leung (HKG); L 2–8	3	—N/a	Did not advance			11
Yukiro Fujii	Women's individual BC1	Flores (ARG); W 4–2	de Oliveira (BRA); W 6–1	—N/a	1 Q	—N/a	Aubert (FRA); L 3–4	Did not advance		5
Hiromi Endo	Women's individual BC1	Koza (POL); W 5–4	DeSilva-Andrade (BER); W 5–1	—N/a	1 Q	—N/a	Basic (CRO); W 7–0	Tan (SGP); L 1–5	DeSilva-Andrade (BER); W 7–0	3rd place, bronze medalist(s)
Ayane Ichinoe	Women's individual BC3	Callupe (PER); W 5-1	Ntenta (GRE); W 8–0	Ferrando (ARG); L 3–6	2 Q	—N/a	Kang S-h (KOR); L 2–3	Did not advance		7
Masayuki Arita; Ayane Ichinoe	Mixed pairs BC3	France; L 3–3*	Australia; L 2–5	—N/a	3	—N/a	Did not advance			9
Takayuki Hirose; Hidetaka Sugimura; Hiromi Endo	Mixed team BC1/BC2	Tunisia; W 11–1	South Korea; W 5–3	—N/a	1 Q	—N/a	Brazil; W 4*–4	Indonesia; L 0–9	South Korea; W 8–3	3rd place, bronze medalist(s)

== Blind football ==
Summary

Team	Event	Group Stage				Semifinals	Final / BM	
Team	Event	Opposition Score	Opposition Score	Opposition Score	Rank	Opposition Score	Opposition Score	Rank
Japan men's	Men's tournament	Colombia; L 0–1	Morocco; L 0–1	Argentina; L 0–1	4	—N/a	Turkey; L 0–2	8

Team roster

Coach: Eiji Nakagawa

The following is the Japan squad in the football 5-a-side tournament of the 2024 Summer Paralympics.

No.	Pos.	Player	Class	Date of birth (age)
1	GK	Daisuke Sato	Sighted	16 June 1984 (aged 40)
2	DF	Futo Nagamori	B1	19 February 2001 (aged 23)
3	DF	Robertoizumi Sasaki	B1	1 May 1978 (aged 46)
4	FW	Hiroto Takahashi	B1	5 October 1998 (aged 25)
6	MF	Taichi Hirabayashi	B1	2 October 2006 (aged 17)
8	FW	Masaki Goto	B1	8 April 1985 (aged 39)
10	MF	Ryo Kawamura	B1	12 February 1989 (aged 35)
11	MF	Kento Torii	B1	9 June 1991 (aged 33)
14	FW	Yuzuki Sonobe	B1	31 August 2003 (aged 20)
15	GK	Kenya Izumi	Sighted	25 July 1992 (aged 32)

Group stage

Pos	Team	Pld	W	D	L	GF	GA	GD	Pts	Qualification
1	Colombia	3	2	1	0	2	0	+2	7	Semi-finals
2	Argentina	3	1	2	0	1	0	+1	5	Semi-finals
3	Morocco	3	1	1	1	1	1	0	4	Fifth place match
4	Japan	3	0	0	3	0	3	−3	0	Seventh place match

Source: Paris 2024
1 September 2024
11:30

Japan	0–1	Colombia
	Report	Pérez 8'

Eiffel Tower Stadium, Paris
Attendance: 8,900
Referee: Tom Jozef de Bruyne (Belgium)

2 September 2024
13:30

Japan	0–1	Morocco
	Report	Sasaki 26' (o.g.)

Eiffel Tower Stadium, Paris
Attendance: 8,790
Referee: François Carcouët (France)

3 September 2024
13:30

Argentina	1–0	Japan
Fernández 10'	Report

Eiffel Tower Stadium, Paris
Attendance: 8,890
Referee: Tom Jozef de Bruyne (Belgium)

Seventh place match

5 September 2024
10:30

Turkey	2–0	Japan
Şatay 22'; Aslan 29'	Report

Eiffel Tower Stadium, Paris
Attendance: 8,979
Referee: Ellen Dayane Grosskopf (Brazil)

== Cycling ==
Japan entered two para-cyclists (one in each gender) after finished the top eligible nation's at the 2022 UCI Nation's ranking allocation ranking.

=== Road ===
Men

Athlete	Event	Qualification		Final	
Athlete	Event	Result	Rank	Result	Rank
Kazuhei Kimura; Pilot: Kiaki Miura	Men's road race B				
Kazuhei Kimura; Pilot: Kiaki Miura	Men's road time trial B				
Shota Kawamoto	Men's road race C1–3				
Shota Kawamoto	Men's road time trial C2				

Women

Athlete	Event	Qualification		Final	
Athlete	Event	Result	Rank	Result	Rank
Keiko Sugiura	Women's road time trial C1-3				
Keiko Sugiura	Women's road race C1-3				

=== Track ===
Men

Athlete	Event	Qualification		Final	
Athlete	Event	Result	Rank	Result	Rank
Kazuhei Kimura; Pilot: Kiaki Miura	Men's time trial B				
Kazuhei Kimura; Pilot: Kiaki Miura	Men's pursuit B	4:28.676	10	Did not advance	
Shota Kawamoto	Men's time trial C1-3	1:07.375	6 Q	1:07.659	6
Shota Kawamoto	Men's pursuit C2	3:29.875	4 QB	Bronze medal contest Robertson (GBR); L3:33.488-3:30.497	4

Women

Athlete	Event	Qualification		Final	
Athlete	Event	Result	Rank	Result	Rank
Keiko Sugiura	Women's time trial C1-3	39.449	7	Did not advance	
Keiko Sugiura	Women's pursuit C1-3	3:53.549	5	Did not advance	

Qualification Legend: QB=Final Bronze medal; QG=Final Gold medal; QF=Final

== Equestrian ==
Japan entered two para-equestrians into the Paralympic equestrian competition, by virtue of the nations individual final world para dressage rankings.

Individual

Athlete	Horse	Event	Total	
Athlete	Horse	Event	Score	Rank
Sho Inaba	Huzette BH	Individual championship test grade II		
Sho Inaba	Huzette BH	Individual freestyle test grade II		
Soshi Yoshigoe	Javyro	Individual championship test grade II		
Soshi Yoshigoe	Javyro	Individual freestyle test grade II		

== Goalball ==
The Japanese men's and women's goalball teams qualified for the paralympic games.

Summary

Team	Event	Group Stage				Quarterfinal	Semifinal	Final / BM	
Team	Event	Opposition Score	Opposition Score	Opposition Score	Rank	Opposition Score	Opposition Score	Opposition Score	Rank
Japan men's	Men's tournament	China; L 6–7	Ukraine; L 8–9	Egypt; W 11–1	3 Q	United States; W 6–4	China; W 13–5	Ukraine; W 4–3 (a.e.t.)	1st place, gold medalist(s)
Japan women's	Women's tournament	South Korea; W 3–1	Canada; W 2–1	France; W 6–0	1 Q	Brazil; L 0–2	—N/a	Canada; L 0–1	6

=== Men's tournament ===
The Japanese men's goalball team qualified for the paralympic games by virtue of the results at the 2023 World Games in Birmingham, Great Britain.

Team roster

Coach: Rikiya Kudo

The following is the Japan squad in the goalball tournament of the 2024 Summer Paralympics.

No.	Player	Class	Date of birth (age)
1	Yuto Sano	B3	20 June 2000 (aged 24)
2	Haruki Torii	B3	7 August 2004 (aged 20)
4	Yuji Taguchi	B2	16 February 1991 (aged 33)
5	Naoki Hagiwara	B3	28 October 1996 (aged 27)
7	Kazuya Kaneko	B3	8 February 2000 (aged 24)
8	Koji Miyajiki	B3	20 March 1995 (aged 29)

Group stage

Pos	Team	Pld	W	D	L	GF	GA	GD	Pts	Qualification
1	China	3	3	0	0	20	11	+9	9	Quarter-finals
2	Ukraine	3	2	0	1	16	17	−1	6	Quarter-finals
3	Japan	3	1	0	2	25	17	+8	3	Quarter-finals
4	Egypt	3	0	0	3	8	24	−16	0	Quarter-finals

Source: Paris 2024
29 August 2024
09:00

China	7–6	Japan
Yang 2', 5', 5', 8', 11', 22'; Hu 14'	Report	Kaneko 2', 14', 16'; Miyajiki 3', 6'; Sano 12'

South Paris Arena, Paris
Referee:
Claude Dagenais (Canada)
Raquel Aguado (Spain)

30 August 2024
17:30

Japan	8–9	Ukraine
Miyajiki 3', 3', 5', 6', 13', 17'; Sano 11'; Kaneko 23'	Report	Zhyhalin 0', 1'; Oliinyk 2', 8', 13', 16', 21'; Strelchyk 13', 17'

South Paris Arena, Paris
Referee:
Manar Obeidat (Jordan)
Romualdas Vaitiekus (Lithuania)

1 September 2024
09:00

Egypt	1–11	Japan
Mohamed 6'	Report	Sano 6', 6'; Kaneko 7', 8', 8', 10'; Miyajiki 12', 13', 13', 14'; Torii 13'

South Paris Arena, Paris
Referee:
Juha Vuokila (Finland)
Manar Obeidat (Jordan)

Quarter-finals

2 September 2024
19:30

United States	4–6	Japan
Young 1', 16'; Merren 4', 16'	Report	Kaneko 2', 3', 21'; Miyajiki 9', 15', 15'

South Paris Arena, Paris
Referee:
Juha Vuokila (Finland)
Romualdas Vaitiekus (Lithuania)

Semi-finals

4 September 2024
18:00

China	5–13	Japan
Yang 1', 8', 17'; Yu Deyi 21', 23'	Report	Miyajiki 0', 1', 1', 6', 8'; Kaneko 7', 7' (pen.), 7', 13', 16', 16' (pen.), 20' (pen.), 22' (pen.)

South Paris Arena, Paris
Referee:
Antonios Christodoulos (Greece)
Raquel Aguado (Spain)

Gold medal match

5 September 2024; 19:30	Ukraine	3–4 (a.e.t.)	Japan	South Paris Arena, Paris; Referees: Antonios Christodoulos (Greece); Romualdas Vaitiekus (Lithuania)
5 September 2024; 19:30	Strelchyk 4', 21'; Oliinyk 8'	Report	Kaneko 2'; Miyajiki 2'; Sano 15', 25'	South Paris Arena, Paris; Referees: Antonios Christodoulos (Greece); Romualdas Vaitiekus (Lithuania)

=== Women's tournament ===
The Japanese women's goalball team qualified for the paralympic games by virtue of the results at the 2023 Asia-Pacific Championships in Hangzhou, China.

Team roster

Coach: Mihoko Tsuji

The following is the Japan squad in the goalball tournament of the 2024 Summer Paralympics.

No.	Player	Class	Date of birth (age)
1	Yuki Temma	B1	26 July 1990 (aged 34)
2	Minami Arai	B3	22 January 2003 (aged 21)
4	Saki Amuro	B1	5 March 1993 (aged 31)
6	Norika Hagiwara	B2	3 March 2001 (aged 23)
7	Rieko Takahashi	B1	20 March 1998 (aged 26)
9	Masae Komiya	B1	8 May 1975 (aged 49)

Group stage

Pos	Team	Pld	W	D	L	GF	GA	GD	Pts	Qualification
1	Japan	3	3	0	0	11	2	+9	9	Quarter-finals
2	Canada	3	1	1	1	11	2	+9	4	Quarter-finals
3	South Korea	3	1	1	1	7	4	+3	4	Quarter-finals
4	France (H)	3	0	0	3	1	22	−21	0	Quarter-finals

Source: Paris 2024
Rules for classification: 1) points; 2) goal difference; 3) number of wins; 4) goals against; 5) head-to-head goal difference.
(H) Hosts
29 August 2024
19:00

South Korea	1–3	Japan
Sim Seon-hwa 3'	Report	Hagiwara 7', 17', 23'

South Paris Arena, Paris
Referee:
Linda Welborn (United States)
Patrik Larsson (Sweden)

30 August 2024
14:45

Japan	2–1	Canada
Hagiwara 10', 22'	Report	Reinke 0'

South Paris Arena, Paris
Referee:
Raquel Aguado (Spain)
Linda Welborn (United States)

1 September 2024
19:00

France	0–6	Japan
	Report	Hagiwara 1'; Komiya 10', 18'; Temma 11'; Arai 12'; Amuro 22'

South Paris Arena, Paris
Referee:
Linda Welborn (United States)
Janice Dawson (Canada)

Quarter-finals

3 September 2024
18:00

Japan	0–2	Brazil
	Report	Vitorino 0', 16'

South Paris Arena, Paris
Referee:
Juha Vuokila (Finland)
Romualdas Vaitiekus (Lithuania)

Fifth place match

4 September 2024
11:45

Japan	0–1	Canada
	Report	Burk 4'

South Paris Arena, Paris
Referee:
Sarah Kuper (Germany)
Linda Welborn (United States)

== Paracanoeing ==
Japan earned quota places for the following events through the 2024 ICF Canoe Sprint World Championships in Szeged, Hungary.

Athlete	Event	Heats		Semifinal		Final	
Athlete	Event	Time	Rank	Time	Rank	Time	Rank
Yuta Takagi	Men's KL1						
Monika Seryu	Women's KL1						
Saki Komatsu	Women's VL2						
Shiho Miyajima	Women's VL2						
Shiho Miyajima	Women's VL3						

== Paratriathlon ==
Men

Athlete	Class	Swim	T1	Bike				T2	Run				Time	Rank
Athlete	Class	Swim	T1	L1	L2	L3	L4	T2	L1	L2	L3	L4	Time	Rank
Jumpei Kimura	Men's PTWC													
Giuseppe Romele	Men's PTVI													
Hideki Uda	Men's PTS4													

Women

Athlete	Class	Swim	T1	Bike				T2	Run				Time	Rank
Athlete	Class	Swim	T1	L1	L2	L3	L4	T2	L1	L2	L3	L4	Time	Rank
Yukako Hata	Women's PTS2													

== Powerlifting ==
Athlete	Event	Attempts (kg)				Result (kg)	Rank
Athlete	Event	1	2	3	4	Result (kg)	Rank
Kazuhito Sato	Men's +107 kg						

== Rowing ==
Athlete	Event	Heats		Repechage		Final	
Athlete	Event	Time	Rank	Time	Rank	Time	Rank
Takuya Mori	PR1 men's single sculls	10:19.75	5 R	10:23.78	4 FB		

== Shooting ==
Japan entered three para-shooter's after achieved quota places for the following events by virtue of their best finishes at the 2022, 2023 and 2024 world cup, 2022 World Championships, 2023 World Championships and 2022 Asian Para Games, as long as they obtained a minimum qualifying score (MQS) by May 31, 2020.

Mixed

Athlete	Event	Qualification		Final	
Athlete	Event	Points	Rank	Points	Rank
Kazuya Okada	R3 – 10 m air rifle prone SH1				
Kazuya Okada	R6 – 50 m rifle prone SH1				
Mika Mizuta	R5 – 10 m air rifle prone SH2				
Akiko Sega	R5 – 10 m air rifle prone SH2				

== Swimming ==
Japan secured five quotas at the 2023 World Para Swimming Championships after finishing in the top two places in Paralympic class disciplines.

Men

Athlete	Event	Heats		Final	
Athlete	Event	Result	Rank	Result	Rank
	50 m freestyle S11				
Taiyo Kawabuchi	400 m freestyle S9	4:26.51	7 Q		
Taiyo Kawabuchi	200 m individual medley SM9				
	100 m backstroke S8				
	100 m breaststroke SB14				
Naohide Yamaguchi	100 m butterfly S14	57.74	5 Q		
Shunya Murakami	100 m butterfly S14	1:00.15	12	Did not advance	

Women

Athlete	Event	Heats		Final	
Athlete	Event	Result	Rank	Result	Rank
	200 m individual medley SM14				

== Table tennis ==
Japan entered seven athletes for the Paralympic games. Katsuyoshi Yagi and Natsuki Wada qualified for Paris 2024 by virtue of their gold medal results, in their respective class, at the 2022 Asian Para Games in Hangzhou; meanwhile the other athletes qualified for the games through the allocations of ITTF final world ranking.

Men

Athlete	Event	Round of 32	Round of 16	Quarterfinals	Semifinals	Final / BM	
Athlete	Event	Opposition Result	Opposition Result	Opposition Result	Opposition Result	Opposition Result	Rank
Kazuki Shichino	Individual C4						
Katsuyoshi Yagi	Individual C7						
Koyo Iwabuchi	Individual C9						
Mahiro Funayama	Individual C10						
Mahiro Funayama; Katsuyoshi Yagi	Men's doubles MD18	—N/a	Chojnowski / Grudzien (POL); L 1–3	Did not advance			
Genki Saito; Kazuki Shichino	Doubles MD8	Addis / Chen (AUS); W 3–0	Chaiwut / Glinbancheun (THA); L 0–3	Did not advance			

Women

Athlete	Event	Round of 32	Round of 16	Quarterfinals	Semifinals	Final / BM	
Athlete	Event	Opposition Result	Opposition Result	Opposition Result	Opposition Result	Opposition Result	Rank
Yuri Tomono	Individual C8						
Natsuki Wada	Individual C11						
Kanami Furukawa	Individual C11						

Mixed

Athlete	Event	Round of 32	Round of 16	Quarterfinals	Semifinals	Final / BM	
Athlete	Event	Opposition Result	Opposition Result	Opposition Result	Opposition Result	Opposition Result	Rank
Koyo Iwabuchi; Yuki Tomono	Doubles XD17	Simion / Ciripan (ROM); W 3–0	Manara / Rauen (BRA); L 1–3	Did not advance			

== Taekwondo ==
Japan entered two athletes to compete at the Paralympics competition. Mitsuya Tanaka and Shunsuke Kudo, qualified for Paris 2024, by virtue of finishing within the top six in the Paralympic rankings in their respective class.

Athlete	Event	First round	Quarterfinals	Semifinals	Repechage 1	Final / BM	
Athlete	Event	Opposition Result	Opposition Result	Opposition Result	Opposition Result	Opposition Result	Rank
Mitsuya Tanaka	Men's –58 kg	Mahata (NEP); W 19–3	Zeynalov (AZE); L 5-6	—N/a	Martin Villalobos (ESP); L 7-8	Did not advance	
Shunsuke Kudo	Men's –70 kg	Bye	Samorano (ARG); W 4-5	Çelik (TUR); L 10-15	Bye	López (MEX); L 5-3	5

== Wheelchair basketball ==
Japan women has qualified to compete by virtue of their top four results at the 2024 IWBF Women's Repechage in Osaka.

=== Women's tournament ===
Squad	Group stage				Semifinal	Final	Rank
Squad	Opposition Result	Opposition Result	Opposition Result	Rank	Opposition Result	Opposition Result	Rank
Japan women's	Netherlands	Germany	United States				

== Wheelchair fencing ==
Athlete	Event	Qualification		Round of 16	Quarterfinal	Semifinal	Final / BM	
Athlete	Event	Opposition	Rank	Opposition Score	Opposition Score	Opposition Score	Opposition Score	Rank
Shintaro Kano	Men's épée A							
Shintaro Kano	Men's foil A							
Shintaro Kano	Men's sabre A							
Naoki Yasu	Men's foil A							
Naoki Yasu	Men's épée A							
Michinobu Fujita	Men's épée B							
Michinobu Fujita	Men's foil B							
Anri Sakurai	Women's épée B							
Anri Sakurai	Women's foil B							

== Wheelchair rugby ==
Japan has qualified to compete at the Paralympic games, by virtue of their gold medal results, at the 2023 Asian-Oceanian Wheelchair Rugby Championships in Tokyo.

Standings

Squad	Group stage				Semifinal	Final	Rank
Squad	Opposition Result	Opposition Result	Opposition Result	Rank	Opposition Result	Opposition Result	Rank
Japan national team							

== Wheelchair tennis ==
Japan entered two players into the Paralympics by virtue of the gold medal results in the respective gender single events at the 2022 Asian Para Games in Hangzhou, China.

Athlete	Event	Round of 64	Round of 32	Round of 16	Quarterfinals	Semifinals	Final / BM	
Athlete	Event	Opposition Result	Opposition Result	Opposition Result	Opposition Result	Opposition Result	Opposition Result	Rank
Daisuke Arai	Men's singles	Bye	Shikosana (RSA); W 6–1, 6–0	Hewett (GBR); L 5–7, 2–6	Did not advance			
Takuya Miki	Men's singles	Bye	Ding (CHN); W 6–2, 6–1	Reid (GBR); L 1–6, 1–6	Did not advance			
Tokito Oda	Men's singles	Bye	Bartram (GBR); W 6–2, 7–6	Rodrigues (BRA); W 6–0, 6–1	Egberink (NED); W 6–4, 6–1			1st place, gold medalist(s)
Takashi Sanada	Men's singles	Bye	Stroud (USA); W 6–1, 6–2	Houdet (FRA); L 2–6, 5–7	Did not advance			
Daisuke Arai; Takashi Sanada	Men's doubles	—N/a	Bye					
Takuya Miki; Tokito Oda	Men's doubles	—N/a	Bye					2nd place, silver medalist(s)
Yui Kamiji	Women's singles	—N/a	Venter (RSA); W					
Momoko Ohtani	Women's singles	—N/a	Mörch (FRA)					
Saki Takamuro	Women's singles	—N/a	Moreno (ARG)					
Manami Tanaka	Women's singles	—N/a	Khanthasit (THA)					
Yui Kamiji; Manami Tanaka	Women's doubles	—N/a		Bye				
Momoko Ohtani; Saki Takamuro	Women's doubles	—N/a		Mathewson / Phelps (USA)				

== See also ==
- Japan at the 2024 Summer Olympics
- Japan at the Paralympics
