= Goalball at the 2024 Summer Paralympics – Men's team rosters =

The following is a list of squads for each nation competing in goalball at the 2024 Summer Paralympics – men's tournament in Paris.

== Group A ==
=== Brazil ===
Coach: Jonatas Castro

The following is the Brazil squad in the goalball tournament of the 2024 Summer Paralympics. The roster was announced on 25 June 2024.

No.	Player	Class	Date of birth (age)
3	Paulo Saturnino	B2	1 June 1998 (aged 26)
4	Leomon Moreno	B1	21 August 1993 (aged 31)
5	Josemárcio Sousa	B3	20 July 1989 (aged 35)
6	Romário Marques	B1	20 July 1989 (aged 35)
7	Emerson Ernesto	B3	11 February 1999 (aged 25)
9	André Dantas	B3	19 May 1995 (aged 29)

=== France ===
Coach: Vivien Fournier Dit Chabert

The following is the France squad in the goalball tournament of the 2024 Summer Paralympics.

No.	Player	Class	Date of birth (age)
1	Haris Neimarlija	B1	29 May 1985 (aged 39)
2	Elias Ouni	B3	3 January 2006 (aged 18)
3	Nabil Baich	B3	24 September 1989 (aged 34)
4	Thomas Ramos-Martins	B2	3 May 1996 (aged 28)
5	Kada Boualia	B2	10 June 1988 (aged 36)
6	Ambroise Daudin	B3	14 April 1981 (aged 43)

=== Iran ===
Coach: Bahman Dousti Vala

The following is the Iran squad in the goalball tournament of the 2024 Summer Paralympics.

No.	Player	Class	Date of birth (age)
2	Mohammadmahdi Nafisinasab	B3	5 April 2003 (aged 21)
3	Hassan Jafari	B2	25 March 1990 (aged 34)
4	Mahdi Abbasi	B1	2 November 1998 (aged 25)
6	Nematollah Sarafraz	B2	22 June 1985 (aged 39)
7	Milad Souri	B2	30 April 1995 (aged 29)
8	Mohammad Parnia Jomairan	B3	3 December 1991 (aged 32)

=== United States ===
Coach: Keith Young

The following is the United States squad in the goalball tournament of the 2024 Summer Paralympics.

No.	Player	Class	Date of birth (age)
2	Tyler Merren	B2	29 May 1984 (aged 40)
3	Zion Walker	B3	5 November 2001 (aged 22)
4	Tre'shaun Faison	B2	30 July 2003 (aged 21)
6	Calahan Young	B2	23 February 1995 (aged 29)
7	Matt Simpson	B1	30 March 1990 (aged 34)
8	Christian King	B3	17 October 1999 (aged 24)

== Group B ==
=== China ===
Coach: Yin Shiqiang

The following is the China squad in the goalball tournament of the 2024 Summer Paralympics.

No.	Player	Class	Date of birth (age)
3	Yang Mingyuan	B2	13 January 1998 (aged 26)
4	Chen Liang Liang	B1	28 September 1984 (aged 39)
5	Hu Ming Yao	B2	14 January 1995 (aged 29)
6	Yu Qinquan	B1	19 April 1996 (aged 28)
7	Yu Deyi	B2	16 November 1997 (aged 26)
9	Wang Jinhao	B2	24 February 2001 (aged 23)

=== Egypt ===
Coach: Mohamed Farahat

The following is the Egypt squad in the goalball tournament of the 2024 Summer Paralympics.

No.	Player	Class	Date of birth (age)
3	Ahmed Abdelrazek	B2	28 January 2003 (aged 21)
4	Moaaz Yousef	B3	16 January 2002 (aged 22)
5	Sayed Awwad	B3	1 March 2002 (aged 22)
7	Omar Mohamed	B3	2 August 1997 (aged 27)
8	Mohamed Ismaeil	B1	13 August 2007 (aged 17)
9	Ahmed Elsayed	B2	17 January 2002 (aged 22)

=== Japan ===
Coach: Rikiya Kudo

The following is the Japan squad in the goalball tournament of the 2024 Summer Paralympics.

No.	Player	Class	Date of birth (age)
1	Yuto Sano	B3	20 June 2000 (aged 24)
2	Haruki Torii	B3	7 August 2004 (aged 20)
4	Yuji Taguchi	B2	16 February 1991 (aged 33)
5	Naoki Hagiwara	B3	28 October 1996 (aged 27)
7	Kazuya Kaneko	B3	8 February 2000 (aged 24)
8	Koji Miyajiki	B3	20 March 1995 (aged 29)

=== Ukraine ===
Coach: Fedir Dubrovin

The following is the Ukraine squad in the goalball tournament of the 2024 Summer Paralympics.

No.	Player	Class	Date of birth (age)
1	Vasyl Oliinyk	B2	10 January 1996 (aged 28)
2	Anton Strelchyk	B3	4 March 1992 (aged 32)
3	Fedir Sydorenko	B3	21 December 1999 (aged 24)
4	Yevheniy Tsyhanenko	B3	10 December 1990 (aged 33)
5	Rodion Zhyhalin	B2	21 May 1985 (aged 39)
7	Oleksandr Toporkov	B2	31 May 1991 (aged 33)
