= Ukraine at the 2024 Summer Paralympics =

- Flag of Ukraine
- IPC code: UKR
- NPC: National Sports Committee for the Disabled of Ukraine
- Website: www.paralympic.org.ua

in Paris, France August 28, 2024 – September 8, 2024
- Competitors: 74 in 12 sports
- Flag bearers: Olena Fedota-Isaieva; Roman Polianskyi
- Medals Ranked 7th: Gold 22 Silver 28 Bronze 32 Total 82

Summer Paralympics appearances (overview)
- 1996; 2000; 2004; 2008; 2012; 2016; 2020; 2024

Other related appearances
- Soviet Union (1988); Unified Team (1992)

Ukraine competed at the 2024 Summer Paralympics in Paris, France, from 28 August to 8 September. This was their eighth consecutive appearance at the Summer Paralympics since 1996.

== Medalists ==
Medal	Name	Sport	Event	Date
Gold	Oleksandr Komarov	Swimming	100 m freestyle S5	30 August
Gold	Oksana Zubkovska	Athletics	Long jump T12	1 September
Gold	Mykhailo Serbin	Swimming	100 m backstroke S11	1 September
Gold	Denys Ostapchenko	Swimming	50 m backstroke S3	2 September
Gold	Ihor Tsvietov	Athletics	100 metres T35	2 September
Gold	Nataliia Kobzar	Athletics	Women's 400 metres T37	3 September
Gold	Yurii Shenhur	Swimming	100 m backstroke S7	3 September
Gold	Yuliia Shuliar	Athletics	Women's 400 metres T20	3 September
Gold	Oleksandr Yarovyi	Athletics	Shot put F20	3 September
Gold	Iaroslav Denysenko	Swimming	100 m freestyle S12	4 September
Gold	Anastasiia Moskalenko	Athletics	Shot put F32	4 September
Gold	Andrii Trusov	Swimming	50 m freestyle S7	4 September
Gold	Iaroslav Denysenko; Anna Stetsenko; Maryna Piddubna; Oleksii Virchenko	Swimming	Mixed 4x100 metres freestyle relay 49pts	4 September
Gold	Mariia Pomazan	Athletics	Shot put F35	5 September
Gold	Nataliya Nikolaychyk	Judo	Women's 48 kg J1	5 September
Gold	Yehor Dementyev	Cycling	Men's road race C4-5	6 September
Gold	Ihor Tsvietov	Athletics	200 metres T35	7 September
Gold	Andrii Trusov	Swimming	50 m butterfly S7	7 September
Gold	Oleksandr Nazarenko	Judo	Men's 90 kg J2	7 September
Gold	Anastasiia Harnyk	Judo	Women's 70 kg J1	7 September
Gold	Viktor Didukh	Table tennis	Men's singles C8	7 September
Gold	Vladyslav Yepifanov	Paracanoeing	Men's VL3	8 September
Silver	Anton Kol	Swimming	100 m backstroke S1	29 August
Silver	Iryna Poida	Swimming	200 m freestyle S5	29 August
Silver	Vladyslav Bilyi	Athletics	Javelin throw F38	30 August
Silver	Nataliia Kobzar	Athletics	Women's 200 metres T37	30 August
Silver	Iryna Poida	Swimming	100 m freestyle S5	30 August
Silver	Yehor Dementyev	Cycling	Men's pursuit C5	31 August
Silver	Volodymyr Ponomarenko	Athletics	Shot put F12	31 August
Silver	Anna Stetsenko	Swimming	100 m backstroke S12	31 August
Silver	Andrii Trusov	Swimming	200 m individual medley SM7	31 August
Silver	Roman Polianskyi	Rowing	Men's PR1 single sculls	1 September
Silver	Danylo Chufarov	Swimming	200 m medley SM11	2 September
Silver	Ihor Nimchenko	Swimming	100 m butterfly S10	2 September
Silver	Andrii Trusov	Swimming	400 m freestyle S7	3 September
Silver	Andrii Trusov	Swimming	100 m backstroke S7	3 September
Silver	Illia Yaremenko	Swimming	50 m freestyle S13	3 September
Silver	Mariia Shpatkivska	Athletics	Shot put F46	4 September
Silver	Anna Stetsenko	Swimming	100 m freestyle S12	4 September
Silver	Maksym Veraksa	Swimming	100 m freestyle S12	4 September
Silver	Oksana Boturchuk	Athletics	Women's 100 metres T12	5 September
Silver	Oleksandr Toporkov; Vasyl Oliynyk; Anton Strelchuk; Fedor Sydorenko; Yevhenii Tsyhanenko; Rodion Zhyhalyn	Goalball	Men's team	5 September
Silver	Danylo Chufarov	Swimming	100 m butterfly S11	6 September
Silver	Liudmyla Danylina	Athletics	Women's 1500 metres T20	6 September
Silver	Denys Ostapchenko	Swimming	50 m freestyle S3	6 September
Silver	Olena Fedota; Nadiia Doloh; Yevheniia Breus; Nataliia Morkvych	Fencing	Women's team épée	7 September
Silver	Maryna Lytovchenko	Table tennis	Women's singles C6	7 September
Silver	Denys Ostapchenko	Swimming	200 m freestyle S3	7 September
Silver	Maryna Mazhula	Paracanoeing	Women's KL1	8 September
Silver	Anton Kriukov	Powerlifting	Men's +107 kg	8 September
Bronze	Anna Hontar	Swimming	50 m freestyle S6	29 August
Bronze	Oleksandr Komarov	Swimming	200 m freestyle S5	29 August
Bronze	Ievgenii Bogodaiko	Swimming	200 m individual medley SM7	31 August
Bronze	Viktor Didukh; Iryna Shynkarova	Table tennis	Mixed doubles class XD17	31 August
Bronze	Roman Danyliuk	Athletics	Shot put F12	31 August
Bronze	Iaroslav Denysenko	Swimming	100 m backstroke S12	31 August
Bronze	Anton Kol	Swimming	50 m backstroke S1	31 August
Bronze	Maryna Piddubna	Swimming	50 m freestyle S11	31 August
Bronze	Anna Stetsenko	Swimming	400 m freestyle S13	31 August
Bronze	Ievgenii Bogodaiko	Swimming	100 m breaststroke SB6	1 September
Bronze	Danylo Chufarov	Swimming	100 m backstroke S11	1 September
Bronze	Anna Hontar	Swimming	50 m freestyle S6	1 September
Bronze	Artem Kolinko	Boccia	Men's individual BC4	1 September
Bronze	Danylo Semenykhin	Swimming	100 m breaststroke SB5	1 September
Bronze	Oleksandr Lytvynenko	Athletics	Long jump T36	2 September
Bronze	Zoia Ovsii	Athletics	Discus throw F53	2 September
Bronze	Serhii Palamarchuk	Swimming	50 m backstroke S3	2 September
Bronze	Oleksii Virchenko	Swimming	50 m freestyle S13	2 September
Bronze	Oksana Boturchuk	Athletics	Women's 400 metres T12	3 September
Bronze	Olena Fedota	Fencing	Women's individual sabre B	3 September
Bronze	Maksym Koval	Athletics	Shot put F20	3 September
Bronze	Pavlo Bal	Cycling	Road race H5	5 September
Bronze	Danylo Chufarov	Swimming	100 m breaststroke SB11	5 September
Bronze	Anzhela Havrysiuk	Judo	Women's 57 kg J1	5 September
Bronze	Davyd Khorava	Judo	Men's 60 kg J2	5 September
Bronze	Iaroslav Semenenko; Iryna Poida; Anna Hontar; Oleksandr Komarov	Swimming	Mixed 4×50 metres medley relay 20pts	5 September
Bronze	Olena Fedota	Fencing	Women's individual épée B	6 September
Bronze	Maksym Nikolenko	Table tennis	Men's singles class C8	6 September
Bronze	Mykola Syniuk	Paracanoeing	Men's KL2	7 September
Bronze	Ihor Nimchenko	Swimming	200 m individual medley SM10	7 September
Bronze	Yurii Babynets	Powerlifting	Men's 88 kg	7 September
Bronze	Serhii Palamarchuk	Swimming	200 m freestyle S3	7 September

=== Medals by sport ===
Medals by sport
Sport	1st place, gold medalist(s)	2nd place, silver medalist(s)	3rd place, bronze medalist(s)	Total
Swimming	8	15	17	40
Athletics	8	6	5	19
Judo	3	0	2	5
Table tennis	1	1	2	4
Cycling	1	1	1	3
Paracanoeing	1	1	1	3
Fencing	0	1	2	3
Powerlifting	0	1	1	2
Goalball	0	1	0	1
Rowing	0	1	0	1
Boccia	0	0	1	1
Total	22	28	32	82

=== Medals by gender ===
Medals by gender
Gender	1st place, gold medalist(s)	2nd place, silver medalist(s)	3rd place, bronze medalist(s)	Total
Female	7	11	9	27
Male	14	17	21	52
Mixed	1	0	2	3
Total	22	28	32	82

=== Medals by date ===
Medals by date
Date	1st place, gold medalist(s)	2nd place, silver medalist(s)	3rd place, bronze medalist(s)	Total
29 August	0	2	2	4
30 August	1	3	0	4
31 August	0	4	7	11
1 September	2	1	5	8
2 September	2	2	4	8
3 September	4	3	3	10
4 September	4	3	0	7
5 September	2	2	5	9
6 September	1	3	2	6
7 September	5	3	4	12
8 September	1	2	0	3
Total	22	28	32	82

=== Multiple medalists ===
Multiple medalists
Name	Sport	1st place, gold medalist(s)	2nd place, silver medalist(s)	3rd place, bronze medalist(s)	Total
Andrii Trusov	Swimming	2	3	0	5
Iaroslav Denysenko	Swimming	2	0	1	3
Ihor Tsvietov	Athletics	2	0	0	2
Anna Stetsenko	Swimming	1	2	1	4
Denys Ostapchenko	Swimming	1	2	0	3
Yehor Dementyev	Cycling	1	1	0	2
Nataliia Kobzar	Athletics	1	1	0	2
Oleksandr Komarov	Swimming	1	0	2	3
Viktor Didukh	Table tennis	1	0	1	2
Maryna Piddubna	Swimming	1	0	1	2
Oleksii Virchenko	Swimming	1	0	1	2
Danylo Chufarov	Swimming	0	2	2	4
Iryna Poida	Swimming	0	2	1	3
Olena Fedota	Fencing	0	1	2	3
Oksana Boturchuk	Athletics	0	1	1	2
Anton Kol	Swimming	0	1	1	2
Anna Hontar	Swimming	0	0	3	3
Ievgenii Bogodaiko	Swimming	0	0	2	2
Serhii Palamarchuk	Swimming	0	0	2	2

== Competitors ==
The following is the list of number of competitors in the Games.

Sport	Men	Women	Total
Archery	3	1	4
Athletics	13	8	21
Badminton	1	1	2
Boccia	1	1	2
Cycling	1	0	1
Goalball	6	0	6
Paracanoeing	3	2	5
Rowing	3	3	6
Shooting	1	2	6
Swimming	11	2	13
Table tennis	6	2	8
Taekwondo	0	1	1
Total	49	23	74

== Archery ==
Ukraine secured three quota places. Two of them in men's compound and recurve event by virtue of their result at the 2023 World Para Archery Championships in Plzeň, Czech Republic, meanwhile the other quota being secured in the women's compound event by virtue of her final result at the 2023 European Para Championships in Rotterdam, Netherlands.

Athlete	Event	Ranking Round		Round of 32	Round of 16	Quarterfinals	Semifinals	Finals	
Athlete	Event	Score	Seed	Opposition Score	Opposition Score	Opposition Score	Opposition Score	Opposition Score	Rank
Serhiy Atamanenko	Men's individual compound	678	25	van Montagu (BEL); L 139-140	Did not advance				
Ruslan Tsymbaliuk	Men's individual recurve	604	20	Netsiri (THA); L 5-6	Did not advance				
Vasyl Naumchuk	Men's individual recurve	473	30	Kholidin (INA) WO	Zhao (CHN) L 15-28	Did not advance			
Anna-Viktoriia Shevchenko	Women's Individual recurve	514	19	Daza (COL); W 6-2	Demberel (MGL); L 2-6	Did not advance			
Anna-Viktoria Shevchenko; Ruslan Tsymbaliuk	Mixed team recurve	1118	19	—N/a	Turkey; L 5-3	Did not advance			

== Athletics ==
Ukrainian track and field athletes achieved quota places for the following events based on their results at the 2023 World Championships, 2024 World Championships, or through high performance allocation, as long as they meet the minimum entry standard (MES).

Key

- Note–Ranks given for track events are within the athlete's heat only
- Q = Qualified for the next round
- q = Qualified for the next round as a fastest loser or, in field events, by position without achieving the qualifying target
- DQ = Disqualified
- PR = Paralympic Record
- AR = Area (or continental) Record
- NR = National Record
- SB = Season's Best
- N/A = Round not applicable for the event
- Bye = Athlete not required to compete in round

Track & road events
Men

Athlete	Event	Heat		Final	
Athlete	Event	Result	Rank	Result	Rank
Vladyslav Zahrebelnyi	100 m T37	11.72	4 q	11.84	8
Mykola Raiskyi	100 m T37	11.75	4 q	11.94	9
	200 m T35				
	200 m T37				

Women

Athlete	Event	Heat		Final	
Athlete	Event	Result	Rank	Result	Rank
	400 m T20				
Nataliia Kobzar	200 m T37			27.43	2nd place, silver medalist(s)
	1500 m T20				

Field events
Men

Athlete	Event	Final	
Athlete	Event	Distance	Position
	Long jump T36		
Volodymyr Ponomarenko	Shot put F12	16.12	2nd place, silver medalist(s)
Roman Danyliuk	Shot put F12	16.11	3rd place, bronze medalist(s)
	Shot put F20		
Mykola Zhabnyak	Shot put F37	13.35	8
	Discus throw F37		
Vladyslav Bilyi	Javelin throw F38	52.86	2nd place, silver medalist(s)
Olexandr Doroshenko	Javelin throw F38	51.85	4

Women

Athlete	Event	Final	
Athlete	Event	Distance	Position
	Long jump T12		
	Shot put F20		
	Shot put F35		
	Discus throw F53		
Anastasiia Moskalenko	Club throw F32	25.08 PB	4

== Badminton ==
Ukraine has qualified two para badminton players for the following events, through the release of BWF para-badminton Race to Paris Paralympic Ranking.

Athlete	Event	Group Stage				Semifinal	Final / BM	
Athlete	Event	Opposition Score	Opposition Score	Opposition Score	Rank	Opposition Score	Opposition Score	Rank
Oleksandr Chyrkov	Men's singles SL3	Fujihara (JPN); L (21–19, 16–21, 17–21)						
Oksana Kozyna	Women's singles SL3							

== Boccia ==
Ukraine confirmed two quotas in the boccia competition (one in men and one in women), by virtue of their result as the highest rank nation's in the BC4 pairs event, at the 2023 European Para Championships in Rotterdam, Netherlands.

Athlete	Event	Pool matches						Quarterfinals	Semifinals	Final / BM	
Athlete	Event	Opposition Score	Opposition Score	Opposition Score	Opposition Score	Opposition Score	Rank	Opposition Score	Opposition Score	Opposition Score	Rank
	Men's individual BC4					—N/a					
	Women's individual BC4					—N/a					
	Mixed pairs BC4						2		—N/a		6

== Cycling ==
Ukraine entered one male para-cyclist after finished the top eligible nation's at the 2022 UCI Nation's ranking allocation ranking.

=== Track ===
Athlete	Event	Qualification		Final	
Athlete	Event	Result	Rank	Result	Rank
Yehor Dementyev	Men's pursuit C5	4:17.456	2 Q	Final gold medal Foulon (FRA) L 4:17.770-4:16.158	2nd place, silver medalist(s)
Yehor Dementyev	Men's time trial C4-5	1:08.043	16	Did not advance	

== Goalball ==
Summary

Team	Event	Group Stage				Quarterfinal	Semifinal	Final / BM	
Team	Event	Opposition Score	Opposition Score	Opposition Score	Rank	Opposition Score	Opposition Score	Opposition Score	Rank
Ukraine men's	Men's tournament	Egypt; W 6–3	Japan; W 9–8	China; L 1–6	2 Q	Iran; W 6–3	Brazil; W 6–4	Japan; L 3–4 (a.e.t.)	2nd place, silver medalist(s)

=== Men's tournament ===
The Ukrainian men's goalball team qualified for the paralympic games by virtue of the results at the 2023 IBSA European Championships in Podgorica, Montenegro.

Team roster

Coach: Fedir Dubrovin

The following is the Ukraine squad in the goalball tournament of the 2024 Summer Paralympics.

No.	Player	Class	Date of birth (age)
1	Vasyl Oliinyk	B2	10 January 1996 (aged 28)
2	Anton Strelchyk	B3	4 March 1992 (aged 32)
3	Fedir Sydorenko	B3	21 December 1999 (aged 24)
4	Yevheniy Tsyhanenko	B3	10 December 1990 (aged 33)
5	Rodion Zhyhalin	B2	21 May 1985 (aged 39)
7	Oleksandr Toporkov	B2	31 May 1991 (aged 33)

Group stage

Pos	Team	Pld	W	D	L	GF	GA	GD	Pts	Qualification
1	China	3	3	0	0	20	11	+9	9	Quarter-finals
2	Ukraine	3	2	0	1	16	17	−1	6	Quarter-finals
3	Japan	3	1	0	2	25	17	+8	3	Quarter-finals
4	Egypt	3	0	0	3	8	24	−16	0	Quarter-finals

Source: Paris 2024
29 August 2024
13:15

Ukraine	6−3	Egypt
Oliinyk 0', 8', 12', 16'; Zhyhalin 5'; Strelchyk 22'	Report	Mohamed 11', 18'; Awwad 14'

South Paris Arena, Paris
Referee:
Sarah Kuper (Germany)
Kazuto Ono (Japan)

30 August 2024
17:30

Japan	8–9	Ukraine
Miyajiki 3', 3', 5', 6', 13', 17'; Sano 11'; Kaneko 23'	Report	Zhyhalin 0', 1'; Oliinyk 2', 8', 13', 16', 21'; Strelchyk 13', 17'

South Paris Arena, Paris
Referee:
Manar Obeidat (Jordan)
Romualdas Vaitiekus (Lithuania)

1 September 2024
17:30

China	6–1	Ukraine
Yu Deyi 2', 7'; Yang 13', 17'; Hu 17'; Yu Qinquan 18'	Report	Tsyhanenko 19'

South Paris Arena, Paris
Referee:
Azhi Mahmood (Iraq)
Patrik Larsson (Sweden)

Quarter-finals

2 September 2024
15:00

Ukraine	6–3	Iran
Oliinyk 2', 4', 22', 23'; Strelchyk 9', 23'	Report	Sarafraz 6', 14', 16'

South Paris Arena, Paris
Referee:
Azhi Mahmood (Iraq)
Raquel Aguado (Spain)

Semi-finals

4 September 2024
13:30

Brazil	4–6	Ukraine
Sousa 0'; Moreno 0' (pen.), 18', 21'	Report	Strelchyk 0'; Oliinyk 2', 10', 15', 21' (pen.), 21'

South Paris Arena, Paris
Referee:
Azhi Mahmood (Iraq)
Kazuto Ono (Japan)

Gold medal match

5 September 2024; 19:30	Ukraine	3–4 (a.e.t.)	Japan	South Paris Arena, Paris; Referees: Antonios Christodoulos (Greece); Romualdas Vaitiekus (Lithuania)
5 September 2024; 19:30	Strelchyk 4', 21'; Oliinyk 8'	Report	Kaneko 2'; Miyajiki 2'; Sano 15', 25'	South Paris Arena, Paris; Referees: Antonios Christodoulos (Greece); Romualdas Vaitiekus (Lithuania)

== Paracanoeing ==
Ukraine earned quota places for the following events through the 2023 ICF Canoe Sprint World Championships in Duisburg, Germany.

Athlete	Event	Heats		Semifinal		Final	
Athlete	Event	Time	Rank	Time	Rank	Time	Rank
	Men's KL2						
	Men's VL2						
	Men's VL3						
	Women's KL1						
	Women's VL3						

== Rowing ==
Ukrainian rowers qualified boats in each of the following classes at the 2023 World Rowing Championships in Belgrade, Serbia; and 2024 Final Paralympic Qualification Regatta in Lucerne, Switzerland.

Athlete	Event	Heats		Repechage		Final	
Athlete	Event	Time	Rank	Time	Rank	Time	Rank
Roman Polianskyi	PR1 men's single sculls	9:04.88	1 FA				
Anna Sheremet	PR1 women's single sculls	10:12.00	1 FA				
Iaroslav Koiuda; Anna Aisanova	PR2 mixed double sculls	8:43.38	3 R	8:30.81	2 FA		
Dariia Kotyk; Stanislav Samoliuk	PR3 mixed double sculls	7:26.31	3 R	7:29.24	2 FA		

Qualification Legend: FA=Final A (medal); FB=Final B (non-medal); R=Repechage

== Shooting ==
Ukraine entered six para-shooter's after achieved quota places for the following events by virtue of their best finishes at the 2022, 2023 and 2024 world cup, 2022 World Championships, 2023 World Championships, 2023 European Para Championships, and 2024 European Championships, as long as they obtained a minimum qualifying score (MQS) by May 31, 2020.

Men

Athlete	Event	Qualification		Final	
Athlete	Event	Points	Rank	Points	Rank
	R1 – 10 m air rifle standing SH1				

Women

Athlete	Event	Qualification		Final	
Athlete	Event	Points	Rank	Points	Rank
	P2 – 10 m air pistol SH1				
	R2 – 10 m air rifle standing SH1				

Mixed

Athlete	Event	Qualification		Final	
Athlete	Event	Points	Rank	Points	Rank
	P3 – 25 m pistol SH1				
	R5 – 10 m air rifle prone SH2				
	R9 – 50 m rifle prone SH2				

== Swimming ==
Ukraine secured thirteen quotas at the 2023 World Para Swimming Championships after finishing in the top two places in Paralympic class disciplines.

Men

Athlete	Event	Heats		Final	
Athlete	Event	Result	Rank	Result	Rank
	100 m freestyle S5				
	400 m freestyle S13				
	50 m backstroke S3				
Roman Bondarenko	100 m backstroke S2	2:19.17	7 Q		
	100 m backstroke S7				
	100 m backstroke S11				
	100 m breaststroke SB4				
	100 m butterfly S10				
	100 m butterfly S11				
	100 m butterfly S14				
Dmytro Vanzenko	200 m individual medley SM7	57.94	6 Q		

Women

Athlete	Event	Heats		Final	
Athlete	Event	Result	Rank	Result	Rank
Anna Hontar	50 m freestyle S6	33.70	3 Q		
	100 m freestyle S12				

== Table tennis ==
Ukraine entered eight athletes for the Paralympic games. Viktor Didukh and Maryna Lytovchenko qualified for the games by virtue of their gold medal results, in their respective events, at the 2023 European Para Championships held in Sheffield, Great Britain; meanwhile, the other athletes qualified through the allocation of ITTF final world ranking.

Men

Athlete	Event	Group Stage				Quarterfinals	Semifinals	Final / BM	
Athlete	Event	Opposition Result	Opposition Result	Opposition Result	Rank	Opposition Result	Opposition Result	Opposition Result	Rank
Oleksandr Yezyk	Individual C2								
Vasyl Petruniv	Individual C3								
Viktor Didukh	Individual C8					Andersson (SWE); W 3–2			
Maksym Nikolenko	Individual C8					Berthier (FRA) –			
Ivan Mai	Individual C9					Cepas (ESP); L 0–3			
Lev Kats	Individual C9								

Women

Athlete	Event	Round of 16	Quarterfinals	Semifinals	Final / BM	
Athlete	Event	Opposition Result	Opposition Result	Opposition Result	Opposition Result	Rank
Maryna Lytovchenko	Individual C6	—N/a	Marszal (POL); W 3–0	Ciripan (ROU); W 3–0		
Iryna Shynkarova	Individual C9					
Natalia Kosmina	Individual C11					

== Taekwondo ==
Ukraine entered one athletes to compete at the Paralympics competition. Yuliya Lypetska qualified for Paris 2024, following the triumph of his gold medal results in women's 57 kg classes, at the 2024 European Qualification Tournament in Sofia, Bulgaria.

Athlete	Event	First round	Quarterfinals	Semifinals	Repechage 1	Repechage 2	Final / BM	
Athlete	Event	Opposition Result	Opposition Result	Opposition Result	Opposition Result	Opposition Result	Opposition Result	Rank
Yuliya Lypetska	Women's –57 kg	Mar (FIJ); L 3-25	Did not advance					

== See also ==
- Ukraine at the 2024 Summer Olympics
- Ukraine at the Paralympics
