= 2022 Goalball World Championships =

International goalball tournament

- Location: Matosinhos, Portugal
- Dates: 5–16 December 2022
- Teams: 32

The 2022 Goalball World Championships was held in Matosinhos, Portugal from 5 to 16 December 2022.

The 2022 Goalball World Championships were scheduled to be held in Hangzhou, China, to commence Monday, 5 June 2022, although originally set for Sunday 3 to Friday 15 July 2022. Some precursor regional championships were moved due to the ongoing COVID-19 pandemic: IBSA America moved from 6 to 13 November 2021 to 18 to 22 February 2022, and IBSA Asia moved from November 2021 to commence 21 March 2022.

By June 2022, the IBSA Asia Regional Championships were moved from South Korea to the ISA Sport City at Bahrain for July 2022, and the Centro de Desportos e Congressos de Matosinhos, Portugal, to be the location for the World Championships in December 2022.

The world title won Brazil and Turkey. For Brazil was their third world title in a row.

== Medal summary ==
Event	Gold	Silver	Bronze
Men	Brazil	China	Ukraine
Women	Turkey	South Korea	Israel

== Team rosters ==
=== Men's rosters ===
Algeria		Argentina		Belgium		Brazil	
Coach: Saad Boutiba		Coach: Damián Pelozo		Coach: Johan De Rick		Coach: Jônatas Castro	
1	Samir Belhouchat	1	Matías Brítez	1	Arne Vanhove	4	Leomon Moreno
2	Firas Bentria	2	Oscar Silva	2	Wassime Amnir	5	Jose Márcio Sousa
3	Imad Eddine Godmane	3	Leonardo Jazmín	3	Oljan Mapreni	6	Romário Marques
4	Abdelhalim Larbi	4	Mario Velarde	4	Cemil Dzemail	7	Emerson Silva
5	Djalal Boutadjine	5	Matías Miranda	5	Klison Mapreni	8	Paulo Saturnino
6	Omar Mebarki	6	Eloy Nieva	6	Tom Vanhove	9	André Dantas
Canada		China		Colombia		Egypt	
Coach: Nathalie Séguin		Coach: Yin Shiqiang		Coach: Juan Negrete		Coach: Mohamed Farahat	
1	Ahmad Zeividavi	3	Yang Mingyuan	1	Víctor Montaño	2	Mohamed Elsayed
2	Aron Ghebreyohannes	5	Hu Mingyao	2	Jesús Hernández	3	Ahmed Abdelrazek
6	Blair Nesbitt	6	Yu Qinquan	3	Enrique Acero	5	Sayed Awwad
7	Doug Ripley	7	Yu Deyi	4	Javier Arroyo	6	Ali Ali
8	Mason Smith	8	Sun Zhen	7	Andrés Berrío	7	Omar Mohamed
9	Peter Parsons	9	Wang Jinhao	9	Eider Cuéllar	9	Ahmed Elsayed
Germany		Iran		Japan		Lithuania	
Coach: Stefan Weil		Coach: Bahman Dousti		Coach: Rikiya Kudo		Coach: Klaidas Janeika	
1	Michael Dennis	1	Khalil Shahrionarsab	1	Yuto Sano	1	Nerijus Montvydas
3	Thomas Steiger	2	Mohammad Mansouri	3	Masatoshi Ito	2	Artūras Jonikaitis
4	Philipp Tauscher	3	Hasan Jafari	5	Ryoga Yamaguchi	3	Justas Pažarauskas
6	Oliver Hörauf	6	Mohammadmahdi Nafisinab	7	Kazuya Kaneko	5	Mantas Brazauskis
8	Nils Emig	7	Mohammad Soranji	8	Koji Miyajiki	6	Normantas Prušinskas
9	Fabian Diehm	9	Mohsen Abdolmaleki	9	Yuta Kawashima	7	Genrik Pavliukianec
Portugal		Turkey		Ukraine		United States	
Coach: Márcia Ferreira		Coach: Hüseyin Pelgz		Coach: Fedor Dubrovin		Coach: Keith Young	
2	Alexandre Almeida	1	Hüseyin Alkan	1	Vasyl Oliinyk	1	Daryl Walker
3	Fábio Oliveira	2	Oğuzhan Yılmaz	2	Anton Strelchyk	2	Tyler Merren
5	João Mota	3	Ebubekir Sıddık Kara	3	Vitalii Haponenko	3	Andrew Jenks
6	João Macedo	4	Bilal Tekin	4	Yevheniy Tsyhanenko	7	Matthew Simpson
9	João Sousa	6	Yunus Emre Akyüz	5	Rodion Zhyhalin	8	Christian King
		7	Tuncay Karakaya	7	Oleksandr Toporkov	9	Lewis Walker

=== Women's rosters ===
Algeria		Argentina		Australia		Brazil	
Coach: Miloud Djelaili		Coach: Irina Versele		Coach: Meica Horsburgh		Coach: Gabriel Siqueira	
1	Saliha Slimi	1	Mailen Benítez	1	Zara Perry	1	Larissa Saturnino
2	Chafika Kehifoun	2	Romina Cardozo	2	Nikita Grosser	2	Geovanna Moura
3	Khalida Ibziz	3	Milagros Porretta	3	Clare Whelan	5	Moniza Lima
4	Sarah Abdellaoui	5	Mariela Almada	4	Jessica Clark	6	Kátia Silva
5	Bakhta Benallou	6	Graciela Almada	6	Amelia Hart	7	Danielle Longhini
6	Saida Bourouba	7	Lorena Magaña	7	Raissa Martin	8	Jéssica Vitorino
Canada		Denmark		Egypt		France	
Coach: Trent Farebrother		Coach: Ricky Nielsen		Coach: Abobakr Shaaban		Coach: Anthony Puaud	
3	Whitney Bogart	2	Beritan Dener	2	Amany Abouhussein	1	Audrey Belkhir
4	Meghan Mahon	3	Hazel Gezen	3	Gehad Ezzeldin	2	Sandrine Mourey
5	Emma Reinke	4	Anja Christensen	4	Dina Eladgham	6	Jahmali Berquier
6	Brieann Baldock	7	Juliane Lund	7	Hasnaa Elgabry	7	Gwendoline Matos
7	Amy Burk			9	Shaimaa Hanafy	8	Loïse Rondepierre
8	Maryam Salehizadeh						
Great Britain		Israel		Japan		Mexico	
Coach: Aaron Ford		Coach: Raz Shoham		Coach: Kyoichi Ichikawa		Coach: Rafael Godínez	
1	Sarah Leiter	1	Elham Mahamid Ruzin	1	Yuki Temma	2	Valeria Aguilar
2	Antonia Bunyan	2	Noa Malka	3	Eiko Kakehata	3	Arlyn Moreno
4	Georgie Bullen	3	Gal Hamrani	4	Saki Amuro	4	María Ornelas
5	Meme Robertson	4	Or Mizrahi	6	Norika Hagiwara	7	Adriana Vizcarra
7	Megan Smithson-Booth	5	Roni Ohayon	7	Rieko Takahashi	NP	Abril Moreno
8	Lois Turner	6	Lihi Ben-David	9	Masae Komiya		
Portugal		South Korea		Turkey		United States	
Coach: Márcia Ferreira		Coach: Jung Ji-young		Coach: Gültekin Karasu		Coach: Jacob Czechowski	
1	Eduarda Azevedo	1	Kim Hee-jin	1	Fatma Gül Güler	1	Elizabeth Daugherty
3	Marlene Brandão	2	Park Min-kyoung	2	Reyhan Yılmaz	4	Asya Miller
4	Bruna Lourinho	3	Kim Eun-ji	3	Sevda Altunoluk	5	Amanda Dennis
5	Leonor Silva	6	Sim Seon-hwa	4	Şeydanur Kaplan	7	Eliana Mason
8	Jéssica Castro	7	Seo Min-ji	7	Sevtap Altunoluk	8	Shavon Lockhardt
		8	Choi Eum-jee	8	Berfin Altan	9	Mindy Cook

== Men's event ==
=== Group C ===
Pos	Team	Pld	W	D	L	GF	GA	GD	Pts	
1	Brazil	7	7	0	0	82	36	+46	21	Qualification for quarterfinals
2	Turkey	7	4	2	1	50	32	+18	14	Qualification for quarterfinals
3	Japan	7	4	1	2	59	30	+29	13	Qualification for quarterfinals
4	Germany	7	4	0	3	64	52	+12	12	Qualification for quarterfinals
5	Belgium	7	2	2	3	40	55	−15	8	
6	Portugal	7	2	0	5	40	67	−27	6	
7	Canada	7	1	1	5	37	74	−37	4	
8	Algeria	7	1	0	6	36	62	−26	3	

Source: IBSA
7 December 2022

Portugal	5−7	Japan

8 December 2022

Brazil	10−5	Algeria

8 December 2022

Turkey	10−7	Germany

8 December 2022

Canada	6−6	Belgium

9 December 2022

Germany	16−7	Canada

9 December 2022

Portugal	4−13	Turkey

9 December 2022

Brazil	8−6	Japan

9 December 2022

Belgium	12−2	Algeria

10 December 2022

Canada	7−8	Portugal

10 December 2022

Turkey	6−9	Brazil

10 December 2022

Japan	12−2	Algeria

10 December 2022

Belgium	3−13	Germany

11 December 2022

Algeria	3−4	Turkey

11 December 2022

Japan	13−3	Belgium

11 December 2022

Portugal	2−8	Germany

11 December 2022

Brazil	13−3	Canada

12 December 2022

Turkey	2−2	Japan

12 December 2022

Canada	3−13	Algeria

12 December 2022

Belgium	10−5	Portugal

12 December 2022

Germany	5−13	Brazil

13 December 2022

Belgium	1−11	Brazil

13 December 2022

Algeria	5−6	Portugal

13 December 2022

Germany	1−11	Japan

13 December 2022

Canada	2−10	Turkey

14 December 2022

Algeria	6−14	Germany

14 December 2022

Japan	8−9	Canada

14 December 2022

Turkey	5−5	Belgium

14 December 2022

Portugal	10−17	Brazil

=== Group D ===
Pos	Team	Pld	W	D	L	GF	GA	GD	Pts	
1	China	7	7	0	0	62	23	+39	21	Qualification for quarterfinals
2	Lithuania	7	5	1	1	78	40	+38	16	Qualification for quarterfinals
3	Ukraine	7	4	1	2	46	29	+17	13	Qualification for quarterfinals
4	Iran	7	4	0	3	59	51	+8	12	Qualification for quarterfinals
5	United States	7	4	0	3	59	55	+4	12	
6	Argentina	7	2	0	5	39	59	−20	6	
7	Egypt	7	1	0	6	44	73	−29	3	
8	Colombia	7	0	0	7	20	77	−57	0	

Source: IBSA
8 December 2022

Lithuania	5−10	China

8 December 2022

Ukraine	8−3	Argentina

8 December 2022

United States	15−10	Egypt

8 December 2022

Iran	15−5	Colombia

9 December 2022

China	8−2	Ukraine

9 December 2022

Colombia	2−12	Lithuania

9 December 2022

Argentina	3−9	United States

9 December 2022

Egypt	3−10	Iran

10 December 2022

Ukraine	5−5	Lithuania

10 December 2022

Iran	10−6	Argentina

10 December 2022

Colombia	5−9	Egypt

10 December 2022

United States	4−7	China

11 December 2022

Argentina	9−8	Egypt

11 December 2022

China	7−5	Iran

11 December 2022

Lithuania	12−2	United States

11 December 2022

Ukraine	10−0	Colombia

12 December 2022

Egypt	2−12	China

12 December 2022

Iran	5−15	Lithuania

12 December 2022

United States	5−11	Ukraine

12 December 2022

Colombia	4−7	Argentina

13 December 2022

Iran	9−11	United States

13 December 2022

Egypt	3−6	Ukraine

13 December 2022

Colombia	1−11	China

13 December 2022

Argentina	7−13	Lithuania

14 December 2022

China	7−4	Argentina

14 December 2022

Lithuania	16−9	Egypt

14 December 2022

Ukraine	4−5	Iran

14 December 2022

United States	13−3	Colombia

=== Knockouts ===
Quarter-finals
15 December 2022
Brazil	15
Iran	5
15 December 2022
Lithuania	6
Japan	4
15 December 2022
China	12
Germany	2
15 December 2022
Turkey	5
Ukraine	6

Semi-finals
15 December 2022
Brazil	9
Lithuania	4
15 December 2022
China	9
Ukraine	4

Final
16 December 2022
Brazil	6
China	5
Third place
16 December 2022
Lithuania	2
Ukraine	6

== Women's event ==
=== Group A ===
Pos	Team	Pld	W	D	L	GF	GA	GD	Pts	
1	Canada	7	7	0	0	75	22	+53	21	Qualification for quarterfinals
2	Turkey	7	6	0	1	75	25	+50	18	Qualification for quarterfinals
3	South Korea	7	5	0	2	51	38	+13	15	Qualification for quarterfinals
4	Denmark	7	4	0	3	60	55	+5	12	Qualification for quarterfinals
5	Algeria	7	3	0	4	42	43	−1	9	
6	France	7	1	1	5	34	64	−30	4	
7	Argentina	7	1	1	5	33	65	−32	4	
8	Mexico	7	0	0	7	25	83	−58	0	

Source: IBSA
8 December 2022

South Korea	2−11	Turkey

8 December 2022

Algeria	9−4	Mexico

8 December 2022

Denmark	9−6	France

8 December 2022

Canada	6−4	Argentina

9 December 2022

Mexico	6−14	Denmark

9 December 2022

France	2−12	Canada

9 December 2022

Turkey	12−2	Algeria

9 December 2022

Argentina	2−11	South Korea

10 December 2022

Canada	11−1	Mexico

10 December 2022

Algeria	2−3	South Korea

10 December 2022

Argentina	5−5	France

10 December 2022

Denmark	4−10	Turkey

11 December 2022

Turkey	7−12	Canada

11 December 2022

South Korea	11−9	Denmark

11 December 2022

Algeria	14−4	Argentina

11 December 2022

Mexico	7−17	France

12 December 2022

Denmark	8−3	Algeria

12 December 2022

France	1−11	Turkey

12 December 2022

Canada	9−3	South Korea

12 December 2022

Argentina	9−4	Mexico

13 December 2022

Argentina	3−13	Turkey

13 December 2022

Mexico	2−12	South Korea

13 December 2022

France	1−11	Algeria

13 December 2022

Canada	14−4	Denmark

14 December 2022

Turkey	11−1	Mexico

14 December 2022

South Korea	9−3	France

14 December 2022

Algeria	1−11	Canada

14 December 2022

Denmark	12−6	Argentina

=== Group B ===
Pos	Team	Pld	W	D	L	GF	GA	GD	Pts	
1	Israel	7	7	0	0	64	25	+39	21	Qualification for quarterfinals
2	Japan	7	5	1	1	42	17	+25	16	Qualification for quarterfinals
3	United States	7	5	0	2	50	29	+21	15	Qualification for quarterfinals
4	Great Britain	7	4	1	2	43	23	+20	13	Qualification for quarterfinals
5	Brazil	7	3	0	4	50	36	+14	9	
6	Australia	7	2	0	5	34	55	−21	6	
7	Egypt	7	1	0	6	20	58	−38	3	
8	Portugal	7	0	0	7	13	73	−60	0	

Source: IBSA
7 December 2022

Portugal	3−10	Australia

8 December 2022

United States	2−6	Japan

8 December 2022

Brazil	5−7	Great Britain

8 December 2022

Israel	10−0	Egypt

9 December 2022

Japan	11−1	Portugal

9 December 2022

United States	11−4	Brazil

9 December 2022

Great Britain	3−8	Israel

9 December 2022

Egypt	7−12	Australia

10 December 2022

Israel	9−7	United States

10 December 2022

Brazil	4−5	Japan

10 December 2022

Portugal	5−10	Egypt

10 December 2022

Australia	3−7	Great Britain

11 December 2022

Brazil	10−0	Portugal

11 December 2022

Great Britain	10−0	Egypt

11 December 2022

United States	9−1	Australia

11 December 2022

Japan	6−8	Israel

12 December 2022

Israel	8−4	Brazil

12 December 2022

Portugal	0−10	Great Britain

12 December 2022

Egypt	1−4	United States

12 December 2022

Australia	0−7	Japan

13 December 2022

Portugal	4−12	United States

13 December 2022

Egypt	2−12	Brazil

13 December 2022

Australia	5−11	Israel

13 December 2022

Great Britain	2−2	Japan

14 December 2022

Japan	5−0	Egypt

14 December 2022

Brazil	11−3	Australia

14 December 2022

Israel	10−0	Portugal

14 December 2022

United States	5−4	Great Britain

=== Knockouts ===
Quarter-finals
15 December 2022
Canada	7
Great Britain	4
15 December 2022
Japan	2
South Korea	3
15 December 2022
Israel	12
Denmark	2
15 December 2022
Turkey	5
United States	4

Semi-finals
15 December 2022
Canada	2
South Korea	5
15 December 2022
Israel	2
Turkey	4

Final
16 December 2022
South Korea	4
Turkey	10
Third place
16 December 2022
Canada	2
Israel	4
