= Goalball at the 2024 Summer Paralympics =

Paralympic team sport for vision-impaired athletes, for Paris 2024 Paralympic Games

Goalball at the XVII Paralympic Games
- Paralympic Goalball
- Venue: South Paris Arena
- Dates: 29 August – 5 September 2024

Goalball at the 2024 Summer Paralympics was held in the South Paris Arena in Paris, France.

== Qualifying ==
=== Change to format ===
Both men's and women's tournaments used to qualify ten teams each for the 2020 Summer Paralympics. On 19 November 2021, the International Paralympic Committee (IPC) announced that during the 2024 Summer Paralympics, all the team sports would only have eight participating teams for both men and women. This reduced the round-robin games of two events from 40 to 24 games.

=== Men ===
| Means of qualification | Date | Venue | Berths | Qualified |
|---|---|---|---|---|
| Host country allocation | —N/a | —N/a | 1 | France |
| 2022 Goalball World Championships | 5 – 17 December 2022 | (Portugal) Matosinhos | 2 | Brazil; China |
| IBSA World Games | 18–27 August 2023 | (United Kingdom) Birmingham | 1 | Japan |
| IBSA Asia-Pacific Championships | 10–19 November 2023 | (China) Hangzhou | 1 | Iran |
| 2023 Parapan American Games | 17 – 23 November 2023 | (Chile) Santiago | 1 | United States |
| IBSA European Championships | 6–17 December 2023 | (Montenegro) Podgorica | 1 | Ukraine |
| IBSA Africa Championships | 8–15 December 2023 | (Egypt) Cairo | 1 | Egypt |
| Total | | | 8 | |

=== Women ===
| Means of qualification | Date | Venue | Berths | Qualified |
|---|---|---|---|---|
| Host country allocation | —N/a | —N/a | 1 | France |
| 2022 Goalball World Championships | 5 – 17 December 2022 | (Portugal) Matosinhos | 2 | South Korea; Turkey |
| IBSA World Games | 18–27 August 2023 | (United Kingdom) Birmingham | 2 | China; Brazil |
| IBSA Asia-Pacific Championships | 10–19 November 2023 | (China) Hangzhou | 1 | Japan |
| 2023 Parapan American Games | 17 – 23 November 2023 | (Chile) Santiago | 1 | Canada |
| IBSA European Championships | 6–17 December 2023 | (Montenegro) Podgorica | 1 | Israel |
| Total | | | 8 | |

== Men's tournament ==
=== Competition format ===
The eight men's teams were divided into two equal groups for a single round robin group stage. The top four teams of each group advanced to the quarter finals. All matches in the second stage were knock-out format.

Group A: Brazil, Iran, USA, France.

Group B: China, Ukraine, Egypt, Japan.

== Women's tournament ==
=== Competition format ===
The eight women's teams were divided into two equal groups for a single round robin group stage. The top four teams of each group advanced to the quarter finals. All matches in the second stage were knock-out format.

Group C: Türkiye, Israel, China, Brazil.

Group D: South Korea, Canada, France, Japan.

== Medalists ==
| Event | Gold | Silver | Bronze |
|---|---|---|---|
| Men's tournament | Japan; Yuto Sano; Haruki Torii; Yuji Taguchi; Naoki Hagiwara; Kazuya Kaneko; Koji Miyajiki | Ukraine; Vasyl Oliinyk; Anton Strelchyk; Fedir Sydorenko; Yevheniy Tsyhanenko; Rodion Zhyalin; Oleksandr Toporkov | Brazil; André Dantas; Emerson Ernesto; Romário Marques; Leomon Moreno; Paulo Saturnino; Josemárcio Sousa |
| Women's tournament | Turkey; Fatma Gül Güler; Reyhan Yılmaz; Sevda Altunoluk; Şeydanur Kaplan; Sevtap Altunoluk; Berfin Altan | Israel; Elham Mahamid Ruzin; Noa Malka; Gal Hamrani; Ori Mizrahi; Roni Ohayon; Lihi Ben-David | China; Zhang Xiling; Cao Zhenhua; Xu Miao; Wang Chunyan; Ke Peiying; Wang Chunhua |
