= Algeria men's national goalball team =

Algerian national team, for the Paralympic sport of goalball

Algeria women's national goalball team
- Sport: Goalball
- League: IBSA
- Division: Men
- Region: IBSA Africa
- Location: Algeria
- Colours: Green, red
- Championships: Paralympic Games medals: : 0: 0: 0 World Championship medals: : 0: 0: 0

Algerian men's national goalball team is the men's national team of Algeria. Goalball is a team sport designed specifically for athletes with a vision impairment. The team takes part in international goalball competitions.

== Paralympic Games ==
=== 1992 Barcelona ===
The team competed in the 1992 Summer Paralympics, from 3 to 14 September 1992, in the Pavelló de la Vall d'Hebron indoor stadium, Barcelona, Spain. There were twelve men's and eight women's teams. The team came 12th.

=== 2012 London ===
The team competed in the 2012 Summer Paralympics from 30 August to 7 September 2012, in the Copper Box Arena, London, England. There were twelve men's and ten women's teams (an increase of two more women's teams from past years).

The playing team consisted of Firas Bentria, Abdelhalim Larbi, Imad Eddine Godmane, Mohamed Ouali, Mohamed Mokrane, and Ishak Boutaleb.

The following is the Algeria roster in the men's goalball tournament of the 2012 Summer Paralympics.

No.	Player	Age
1	Mohamed Ouali	38
2	Firas Bentria	26
3	Ishak Boutaleb	25
5	Imad Eddine Godmane	21
7	Abdelhalim Larbi	28
9	Mohamed Mokrane	37

Group B

Team	Pld	W	D	L	GF	GA	GD	Pts	Qualification
Iran	5	4	0	1	32	20	+12	12	Quarterfinals
China	5	3	1	1	20	14	+6	10	Quarterfinals
Belgium	5	3	1	1	19	16	+3	10	Quarterfinals
Algeria	5	2	0	3	18	17	+1	6	Quarterfinals
South Korea	5	1	0	4	18	28	−10	3	Eliminated
Canada	5	1	0	4	16	28	−12	3	Eliminated

Source: "London 2012 Paralympic Games - Goalball results" (PDF). Paralympic.org. 3 October 2012 – via Goalball.sport.

30 August 2012; 15:00	South Korea	4 – 3	Algeria	Copper Box, London; Referees: Kimberly Anderson (USA), Carla Da Matta (BRA)
30 August 2012; 15:00	Hong 4	Report	Mokrane 2 Larbi 1	Copper Box, London; Referees: Kimberly Anderson (USA), Carla Da Matta (BRA)

31 August 2012; 21:00	Algeria	5 – 2	Belgium	Copper Box, London; Referees: Ali Aldarsony (KSA), Juha Vuokila (FIN)
31 August 2012; 21:00	Mokrane 3 Larbi 2	Report	de Rick 1 Bihi 1	Copper Box, London; Referees: Ali Aldarsony (KSA), Juha Vuokila (FIN)

1 September 2012; 19:45	Algeria	0 – 1	China	Copper Box, London; Referees: Dina Murdie (GBR), Ali Aldarsony (KSA)
1 September 2012; 19:45		Report	Yao 1	Copper Box, London; Referees: Dina Murdie (GBR), Ali Aldarsony (KSA)

2 September 2012; 16:15	Canada	6 – 8	Algeria	Copper Box, London; Referees: Vilma Venckutonyte (LTU), Yasser Omar (EGY)
2 September 2012; 16:15	Caron 4 Gaulin 2	Report	Mokrane 8	Copper Box, London; Referees: Vilma Venckutonyte (LTU), Yasser Omar (EGY)

3 September 2012; 10:15	Iran	4 – 2	Algeria	Copper Box, London; Referees: Dina Murdie (GBR), Tony Connolly (USA)
3 September 2012; 10:15	Sayahi 2 Jafari 1 Shirdel 1	Report	Mokrane 2	Copper Box, London; Referees: Dina Murdie (GBR), Tony Connolly (USA)

Quarter-finals

5 September 2012; 15:45	Turkey	3 – 1	Algeria	Copper Box, London; Referees: Juha Vuokila (FIN), Dawna Christy (CAN)
5 September 2012; 15:45	Karakaya 3	Report	Mokrane 1	Copper Box, London; Referees: Juha Vuokila (FIN), Dawna Christy (CAN)

=== 2016 Rio de Janeiro ===
Algeria's men entered the tournament ranked 12th in the world.

The following is the Algeria roster in the men's goalball tournament of the 2016 Summer Paralympics.

No.	Player	Class	Date of birth (age)
1	Samir Belhouchat	B2	20 October 1974 (aged 41)
2	Ishak Boutaleb	B1	23 April 1987 (aged 29)
3	Imad Eddine Godmane	B1	23 March 1991 (aged 25)
4	Abdelhalim Larbi	B1	26 May 1984 (aged 32)
5	Mohamed Mokrane	B2	9 October 1974 (aged 41)
6	Djilali Chenaoui	B3	20 May 1992 (aged 24)

Pos	Team	Pld	W	D	L	GF	GA	GD	Pts	Qualification
1	Brazil (H)	4	4	0	0	42	15	+27	12	Quarter-finals
2	Sweden	4	3	0	1	33	23	+10	9	Quarter-finals
3	Germany	4	1	0	3	24	26	−2	3	Quarter-finals
4	Canada	4	1	0	3	26	39	−13	3	Quarter-finals
5	Algeria	4	1	0	3	25	47	−22	3	

Source: Paralympic.org
(H) Hosts

8 September 2016; 13:15	Algeria	0–10	Germany	Future Arena, Rio de Janeiro; Referees: Nejc Jakic (SLO), Daniel Voltan (BRA)
8 September 2016; 13:15		Report	Horauf 5 Feistle 4 Steiger 1	Future Arena, Rio de Janeiro; Referees: Nejc Jakic (SLO), Daniel Voltan (BRA)

9 September 2016; 17:30	Sweden	12–6	Algeria	Future Arena, Rio de Janeiro; Referees: Daniel Voltan (BRA), Yoshinori Nii (JPN)
9 September 2016; 17:30	Weichel 5 Björkstrand 4 Seremeti 3	Report	Belhouchat 5 Mokrane 1	Future Arena, Rio de Janeiro; Referees: Daniel Voltan (BRA), Yoshinori Nii (JPN)

11 September 2016; 09:00	Brazil	12–2	Algeria	Future Arena, Rio de Janeiro; Referees: Alexander Knecht (GER), Bülent Kimyon (TUR)
11 September 2016; 09:00	Moreno 6 Marques 3 Sousa 2 Celente 1	Report	Mokrane 2	Future Arena, Rio de Janeiro; Referees: Alexander Knecht (GER), Bülent Kimyon (TUR)

12 September 2016; 11:30	Algeria	17–13	Canada	Future Arena, Rio de Janeiro; Referees: Raili Sipura (FIN), Alexander Knecht (GER)
12 September 2016; 11:30	Mokrane 9 Godmane 6 Larbi 1 Boutaleb 1	Report	Nesbitt 6 Hache 3 Gaulin 3 Larbi 1 (o.g)	Future Arena, Rio de Janeiro; Referees: Raili Sipura (FIN), Alexander Knecht (GER)

=== 2020 Tokyo ===
The team competed in the 2020 Summer Paralympics, with competition from Wednesday 25 August to finals on Friday 3 September 2021, in the Makuhari Messe arena, Chiba, Tokyo, Japan.

The following is the Algeria roster in the men's goalball tournament of the 2020 Summer Paralympics.

No.	Player	Class	Date of birth (age)
1	Samir Belhouchat	B2	20 October 1974 (aged 46)
2	Firas Bentria	B1	5 October 1986 (aged 34)
3	Imad Eddine Godmane	B1	23 March 1991 (aged 30)
4	Omar Mebarki	B2	5 February 1994 (aged 27)
5	Djalal Boutadjine	B3	18 December 1994 (aged 26)
7	Abdelhalim Larbi	B1	26 May 1984 (aged 37)

Pos	Team	Pld	W	D	L	GF	GA	GD	Pts	Qualification
1	Japan (H)	4	3	0	1	37	15	+22	9	Quarter-finals
2	Brazil	4	3	0	1	35	17	+18	9	Quarter-finals
3	United States	4	2	0	2	25	35	−10	6	Quarter-finals
4	Lithuania	4	1	1	2	24	31	−7	4	Quarter-finals
5	Algeria	4	0	1	3	20	43	−23	1	

Source: TOCOG
(H) Hosts

Round-robin

25 August 2021; 13:15	Algeria	4–13	Japan	Makuhari Messe, Tokyo; Referees: Bas Spaans (Netherlands), Woradet Kultawongwattana (Thailand)
25 August 2021; 13:15	Belhouchat 3 Larbi 1	Report	Kaneko 7 Miyajiki 3 Sano 2 Yamaguchi 1	Makuhari Messe, Tokyo; Referees: Bas Spaans (Netherlands), Woradet Kultawongwattana (Thailand)

26 August 2021; 19:00	Lithuania	7–7	Algeria	Makuhari Messe, Tokyo; Referees: Warrick Jackes (Australia), Svitlana Moroz (Ukraine)
26 August 2021; 19:00	Pavliukianec 3 Pazarauskas 3 Zibolis 1	Report	Belhouchat 7	Makuhari Messe, Tokyo; Referees: Warrick Jackes (Australia), Svitlana Moroz (Ukraine)

27 August 2021; 20:30	Brazil	10–4	Algeria	Makuhari Messe, Tokyo; Referees: Robert Avery (Great Britain), Raquel Gomez Aguado (Spain)
27 August 2021; 20:30	Moreno 5 Sousa 4 De Melo 1	Report	Belhouchat 4	Makuhari Messe, Tokyo; Referees: Robert Avery (Great Britain), Raquel Gomez Aguado (Spain)

29 August 2021; 17:30	Algeria	5–13	United States	Makuhari Messe, Tokyo; Referees: Romualdas Vaitiekus (Lithuania), Warrick Jackes (Australia)
29 August 2021; 17:30	Belhouchat 4 Larbi 1	Report	Young 8 Simpson 3 Walker 2	Makuhari Messe, Tokyo; Referees: Romualdas Vaitiekus (Lithuania), Warrick Jackes (Australia)

== World Championships ==
=== 1998 Madrid ===
The team competed in the 1998 World Championships, in Madrid, Spain. There were sixteen men's and eleven women's teams. They finished fifteenth overall.

=== 2002 Rio de Janeiro ===
The team competed in the 2002 World Championships, in Rio de Janeiro, Brazil, from 30 August 2002 to 8 September 2002. There were fourteen men's and ten women's teams. They finished twelfth overall.

=== 2006 Spartanburg ===
The team competed in the 2006 World Championships, in July 2006, in Spartanburg, South Carolina, United States of America. There were sixteen men's and thirteen women's teams. They finished twelfth in the overall standings.

=== 2010 Sheffield ===
The team competed in the 2010 World Championships, from 20 to 25 June 2010, in Sheffield, England. There were sixteen men's and twelve women's teams. They finished seventh overall.

=== 2014 Espoo ===
The team competed in the 2014 World Championships from 30 June to 5 July 2014, in Espoo, Finland. There were fourteen men's and ten women's teams. They placed tenth overall.

=== 2018 Malmö ===
The team competed in the 2018 World Championships from 3 to 8 June 2018, at the Baltiska Hallen, Malmö, Sweden. There were sixteen men's and twelve women's teams. They placed eleventh in final standings.

=== 2022 Matosinhos ===
The team competed in the 2022 World Championships from 7 to 16 December 2022, at the Centro de Desportos e Congressos de Matosinhos, Portugal. There were sixteen men's and sixteen women's teams. They placed eighth in Pool C, and fourteenth in final standings.

== IBSA World Games ==
- 2003 IBSA World Games were held in Quebec City, Canada . 17th
- 2007 IBSA World Games were held in São Paulo, Brazil . 7th
- 2011 IBSA World Games were held in Antalya, Turkey . 6th

== Regional championships ==
The team competes within IBSA Africa goalball region.

- African goalball championship 2013 in Nairobi, Kenya, 1st
- African goalball championship 2016 in Algiers, Algeria, 1st
- African goalball championship 2017 in Sharm el Sheikh, Egypt, 1st

=== 2020 Port Said ===
The team competed at the 2020 IBSA Goalball African Championships, from 2 and 5 March 2020, at Port Said, Egypt, against Egypt and Morocco. This regional tournament would have been a regional championships if Cameroon, Ghana, Kenya, and Niger men's teams had attended as originally indicated. The team placed first.

=== 2021 Cape Coast ===
The team competed at the 2021 IBSA Goalball African Championships, from Monday 6 to Friday 10 December 2021, at the University of Cape Coast Sports Complex, Cape Coast, Ghana. This championships was a qualifier for the 2022 World Championships. Of the six men's teams (Algeria, Cameroon, Egypt, Ghana, Kenya, Nigeria), Algeria went through undefeated.

== See also ==
- Disabled sports
- Algeria women's national goalball team
- Algeria at the Paralympics
