= Naoki Hagiwara =

Japanese goalball player (born 1996)

Personal information
- Nationality: Japanese
- Born: October 28, 1996 (age 29) Inagi, Tokyo, Japan

Sport
- Sport: Goalball
Medal record
Representing Japan
Summer Paralympics
Gold medal – first place	2024 Paris	Men's

Naoki Hagiwara (萩原直輝, Hagiwara Naoki; born October 28, 1996 in Inagi, Tokyo, Japan) is a Japanese goalball player and a member of Japanese men's national team. He was on the team that won gold in the men's tournament, at the 2024 Summer Paralympics.
