= Iran men's national goalball team =

Iranian national team, for the Paralympic sport of goalball

- Sport: Goalball
- League: IBSA
- Division: Men
- Region: IBSA Asia
- Location: Iran
- Colours: White, red, green
- Championships: Paralympic Games medals: : 0: 0: 0 World Championship medals: : 0: 0: 1

Iran men's national goalball team is the men's national team of Iran. Goalball is a team sport designed specifically for athletes with a vision impairment. The team takes part in international competitions.

== Paralympic Games ==
=== 2012 London ===
The team competed in the 2012 Summer Paralympics, with competition from 29 August to 9 September 2012, in the Copper Box Arena arena, London, Brazil.

The following is the Iran roster in the men's goalball tournament of the 2012 Summer Paralympics.

No.	Player	Age
1	Seyed Mehdi Sayahi	26
2	Mostafa Shahbazi Yajlou	23
3	Hassan Jafari	22
5	Javad Shirdel	21

Team	Pld	W	D	L	GF	GA	GD	Pts	Qualification
Iran	5	4	0	1	32	20	+12	12	Quarterfinals
China	5	3	1	1	20	14	+6	10	Quarterfinals
Belgium	5	3	1	1	19	16	+3	10	Quarterfinals
Algeria	5	2	0	3	18	17	+1	6	Quarterfinals
South Korea	5	1	0	4	18	28	−10	3	Eliminated
Canada	5	1	0	4	16	28	−12	3	Eliminated

Source: "London 2012 Paralympic Games - Goalball results" (PDF). Paralympic.org. 3 October 2012 – via Goalball.sport.

Round-robin

30 August 2012; 13:45	China	5 – 9	Iran	Copper Box, London; Referees: Launel Scott (CAN), Bülent Kimyon (TUR)
30 August 2012; 13:45	Yao 3 Chen 2	Report	Sayahi 9	Copper Box, London; Referees: Launel Scott (CAN), Bülent Kimyon (TUR)

31 August 2012; 19:45	Iran	9 – 2	Canada	Copper Box, London; Referees: Dina Murdie (GBR), Tony Connolly (USA)
31 August 2012; 19:45	Jafari 4 Sayahi 3 Shahbazi 1 Shirdel 1	Report	Gaulin 2	Copper Box, London; Referees: Dina Murdie (GBR), Tony Connolly (USA)

1 September 2012; 18:30	Belgium	8 – 6	Iran	Copper Box, London; Referees: Morten Hammershoi (DEN), Juha Vuokila (FIN)
1 September 2012; 18:30	de Rick 3 Bihi 3 Vanhove 1 Mapreni 1	Report	Sayahi 3 Jafari 2 Shahbazi 1	Copper Box, London; Referees: Morten Hammershoi (DEN), Juha Vuokila (FIN)

2 September 2012; 13:45	Iran	4 – 3	South Korea	Copper Box, London; Referees: Janne Ahokas (FIN), Dawna Christy (CAN)
2 September 2012; 13:45	Sayahi 4	Report	Hong SW 2 Kim CH 1	Copper Box, London; Referees: Janne Ahokas (FIN), Dawna Christy (CAN)

3 September 2012; 10:15	Iran	4 – 2	Algeria	Copper Box, London; Referees: Dina Murdie (GBR), Tony Connolly (USA)
3 September 2012; 10:15	Sayahi 2 Jafari 1 Shirdel 1	Report	Mokrane 2	Copper Box, London; Referees: Dina Murdie (GBR), Tony Connolly (USA)

Quarter-finals

5 September 2012; 21:00	Iran	1 – 5	Finland	Copper Box, London; Referees: Morten Hammershoi (DEN), Kimberly Anderson (USA)
5 September 2012; 21:00	Sayahi 1	Report	Posio 3 Mattila 2	Copper Box, London; Referees: Morten Hammershoi (DEN), Kimberly Anderson (USA)

=== 2024 Paris ===
The team competed in the 2024 Summer Paralympics, with competition from 29 August to 5 September 2024, in the South Paris Arena, Paris, France.

The following is the Iran roster in the men's goalball tournament of the 2024 Summer Paralympics.

No.	Player	Class	Date of birth (age)
2	Mohammadmahdi Nafisinasab	B3	5 April 2003 (aged 21)
3	Hassan Jafari	B2	25 March 1990 (aged 34)
4	Mahdi Abbasi	B1	2 November 1998 (aged 25)
6	Nematollah Sarafraz	B2	22 June 1985 (aged 39)
7	Milad Souri	B1	30 April 1995 (aged 29)
8	Mohammad Parnia Jomairan	B1	3 December 1991 (aged 32)

Pos	Team	Pld	W	D	L	GF	GA	GD	Pts	Qualification
1	Brazil	3	2	1	0	28	20	+8	7	Quarter-finals
2	United States	3	2	0	1	27	24	+3	6	Quarter-finals
3	Iran	3	1	1	1	26	29	−3	4	Quarter-finals
4	France (H)	3	0	0	3	17	25	−8	0	Quarter-finals

Source: Paris 2024
(H) Hosts

Round-robin

30 August 2024
13:15

France	8–12	Iran
Ouni 0', 9', 11', 15', 22'; Boualia 1'; Baich 13', 17'	Report	Jafari 2', 4', 6', 7', 7', 9', 12', 22'; Sarafraz 10'; Souri 17', 17'; Parnia Jomairan 23'

South Paris Arena, Paris
Referee:
Juha Vuokila (Finland)
Azhi Mahmood (Iraq)

31 August 2024
17:30

Brazil	7–7	Iran
Dantas 0', 2', 6', 19'; Sousa 12'; Moreno 14'; Ernesto 22'	Report	Sarafraz 4', 17', 22', 23'; Souri 17', 21', 23'

South Paris Arena, Paris
Referee:
Patrik Larsson (Sweden)
Juha Vuokila (Finland)

1 September 2024
13:15

Iran	7–14	United States
Souri 8', 8', 9', 21', 21'; Jafari 16', 17'	Report	Young 0', 1', 7', 16', 18', 20'; Merren 3', 6'; King 6', 8', 9'; Simpson 11', 19', 21'

South Paris Arena, Paris
Referee:
Sarah Kuper (Germany)
Claude Dagenais (Canada)

Quarter-finals

2 September 2024
15:00

Ukraine	6–3	Iran
Oliinyk 2', 4', 22', 23'; Strelchyk 9', 23'	Report	Sarafraz 6', 14', 16'

South Paris Arena, Paris
Referee:
Azhi Mahmood (Iraq)
Raquel Aguado (Spain)

Classification Playoff 5/6

3 September 2024
10:45

United States	3–4	Iran
Merren 0'; King 16', 19'	Report	Jafari 3', 22'; Parnia Jomairan 3', 18'

South Paris Arena, Paris
Referee:
Azhi Mahmood (Iraq)
Claude Dagenais (Canada)

== See also ==
- Disabled sports
- Iran women's national goalball team
- Iran at the Paralympics
