= Goalball at the 2024 Summer Paralympics – Men's tournament =

Men's goalball at the XVII Paralympic Games
- Venue: South Paris Arena
- Dates: 29 August – 5 September 2024
- Competitors: 22 from 8 nations
- Teams: 8

Medalists
| 1st place, gold medalist(s) | | Japan |
| 2nd place, silver medalist(s) | | Ukraine |
| 3rd place, bronze medalist(s) | | Brazil |

The goalball men's tournament was contested from 29 August to 5 September. There were eight teams consisting of six players split into two groups: Group A and Group B.

== Participating teams ==
Group A

- Brazil
- France
- United States
- Iran

Group B

- China
- Ukraine
- Egypt
- Japan

== Preliminary rounds ==
=== Group A ===
| Pos | Team | Pld | W | D | L | GF | GA | GD | Pts | Qualification |
|---|---|---|---|---|---|---|---|---|---|---|
| 1 | Brazil | 3 | 2 | 1 | 0 | 28 | 20 | +8 | 7 | Quarter-finals |
| 2 | United States | 3 | 2 | 0 | 1 | 27 | 24 | +3 | 6 | Quarter-finals |
| 3 | Iran | 3 | 1 | 1 | 1 | 26 | 29 | −3 | 4 | Quarter-finals |
| 4 | France (H) | 3 | 0 | 0 | 3 | 17 | 25 | −8 | 0 | Quarter-finals |

Source: Paris 2024
(H) Hosts
29 August 2024
17:30

| Brazil | 8–5 | France |
|---|---|---|
| Dantas 1', 4', 5', 8'; Sousa 4'; Moreno 14'; Marques 15', 16' | Report | Ouni 1', 1'; Boualia 5'; Baich 11'; Daudin 17' |

South Paris Arena, Paris
Referee:
Azhi Mahmood (Iraq)
Manar Obeidat (Jordan)

30 August 2024
09:00

| United States | 8–13 | Brazil |
|---|---|---|
| Young 5', 6', 7', 8', 12', 22'; Merren 7'; King 10' | Report | Moreno 3', 5', 6', 9', 14'; Ernesto 6', 10', 15'; Dantas 8', 13', 14'; Sousa 21'; Saturnino 22' |

South Paris Arena, Paris
Referee:
Kazuto Ono (Japan)
Antonios Christodoulos (Greece)

30 August 2024
13:15

| France | 8–12 | Iran |
|---|---|---|
| Ouni 0', 9', 11', 15', 22'; Boualia 1'; Baich 13', 17' | Report | Jafari 2', 4', 6', 7', 7', 9', 12', 22'; Sarafraz 10'; Souri 17', 17'; Parnia Jomairan 23' |

South Paris Arena, Paris
Referee:
Juha Vuokila (Finland)
Azhi Mahmood (Iraq)

31 August 2024
13:15

| United States | 5–4 | France |
|---|---|---|
| King 0'; Merren 3', 13', 17'; Young 16' | Report | Baich 6', 18'; Ouni 14', 21' |

South Paris Arena, Paris
Referee:
Janice Dawson (Canada)
Azhi Mahmood (Iraq)

31 August 2024
17:30

| Brazil | 7–7 | Iran |
|---|---|---|
| Dantas 0', 2', 6', 19'; Sousa 12'; Moreno 14'; Ernesto 22' | Report | Sarafraz 4', 17', 22', 23'; Souri 17', 21', 23' |

South Paris Arena, Paris
Referee:
Patrik Larsson (Sweden)
Juha Vuokila (Finland)

1 September 2024
13:15

| Iran | 7–14 | United States |
|---|---|---|
| Souri 8', 8', 9', 21', 21'; Jafari 16', 17' | Report | Young 0', 1', 7', 16', 18', 20'; Merren 3', 6'; King 6', 8', 9'; Simpson 11', 19', 21' |

South Paris Arena, Paris
Referee:
Sarah Kuper (Germany)
Claude Dagenais (Canada)

=== Group B ===
| Pos | Team | Pld | W | D | L | GF | GA | GD | Pts | Qualification |
|---|---|---|---|---|---|---|---|---|---|---|
| 1 | China | 3 | 3 | 0 | 0 | 20 | 11 | +9 | 9 | Quarter-finals |
| 2 | Ukraine | 3 | 2 | 0 | 1 | 16 | 17 | −1 | 6 | Quarter-finals |
| 3 | Japan | 3 | 1 | 0 | 2 | 25 | 17 | +8 | 3 | Quarter-finals |
| 4 | Egypt | 3 | 0 | 0 | 3 | 8 | 24 | −16 | 0 | Quarter-finals |

Source: Paris 2024
29 August 2024
09:00

| China | 7–6 | Japan |
|---|---|---|
| Yang 2', 5', 5', 8', 11', 22'; Hu 14' | Report | Kaneko 2', 14', 16'; Miyajiki 3', 6'; Sano 12' |

South Paris Arena, Paris
Referee:
Claude Dagenais (Canada)
Raquel Aguado (Spain)

29 August 2024
13:15

| Ukraine | 6−3 | Egypt |
|---|---|---|
| Oliinyk 0', 8', 12', 16'; Zhyhalin 5'; Strelchyk 22' | Report | Mohamed 11', 18'; Awwad 14' |

South Paris Arena, Paris
Referee:
Sarah Kuper (Germany)
Kazuto Ono (Japan)

30 August 2024
17:30

| Japan | 8–9 | Ukraine |
|---|---|---|
| Miyajiki 3', 3', 5', 6', 13', 17'; Sano 11'; Kaneko 23' | Report | Zhyhalin 0', 1'; Oliinyk 2', 8', 13', 16', 21'; Strelchyk 13', 17' |

South Paris Arena, Paris
Referee:
Manar Obeidat (Jordan)
Romualdas Vaitiekus (Lithuania)

31 August 2024
09:00

| Egypt | 4–7 | China |
|---|---|---|
| Awwad 5'; Elsayed 12'; Mohamed 18'; Yousef 22' | Report | Yu Deyi 1', 6', 10'; Yang 5', 8', 15', 16' |

South Paris Arena, Paris
Referee:
Linda Welborn (United States)
Romualdas Vaitieku (Lithuania)

1 September 2024
09:00

| Egypt | 1–11 | Japan |
|---|---|---|
| Mohamed 6' | Report | Sano 6', 6'; Kaneko 7', 8', 8', 10'; Miyajiki 12', 13', 13', 14'; Torii 13' |

South Paris Arena, Paris
Referee:
Juha Vuokila (Finland)
Manar Obeidat (Jordan)

1 September 2024
17:30

| China | 6–1 | Ukraine |
|---|---|---|
| Yu Deyi 2', 7'; Yang 13', 17'; Hu 17'; Yu Qinquan 18' | Report | Tsyhanenko 19' |

South Paris Arena, Paris
Referee:
Azhi Mahmood (Iraq)
Patrik Larsson (Sweden)

== Knockout stage ==
=== Bracket ===
Quarter-finals
2 September
Brazil | 10
Egypt | 0
2 September
Ukraine | 6
Iran | 3
2 September
China | 12
France | 2
2 September
United States | 4
Japan | 6

Semi-finals
4 September
Brazil | 4
Ukraine | 6
4 September
China | 5
Japan | 13

Gold medal match
5 September
Ukraine | 3
Japan (a.e.t.) | 4
Bronze medal match
5 September
Brazil | 5
China | 3

=== Quarter-finals ===
2 September 2024
13:15

| Brazil | 10–0 | Egypt |
|---|---|---|
| Moreno 4', 6'; Ernesto 9', 15'; Sousa 10', 12', 14'; Dantas 11', 17'; Saturnino 17' | Report |

South Paris Arena, Paris
Referee:
Antonios Christodoulos (Greece)
Sarah Kuper (Germany)

2 September 2024
15:00

| Ukraine | 6–3 | Iran |
|---|---|---|
| Oliinyk 2', 4', 22', 23'; Strelchyk 9', 23' | Report | Sarafraz 6', 14', 16' |

South Paris Arena, Paris
Referee:
Azhi Mahmood (Iraq)
Raquel Aguado (Spain)

2 September 2024
17:45

| China | 12–2 | France |
|---|---|---|
| Yang 1', 2', 6', 7', 9', 10', 13', 14', 14', 15'; Yu Deyi 1' | Report | Baich 9', 12' |

South Paris Arena, Paris
Referee:
Patrik Larsson (Sweden)
Claude Dagenais (Canada)

2 September 2024
19:30

| United States | 4–6 | Japan |
|---|---|---|
| Young 1', 16'; Merren 4', 16' | Report | Kaneko 2', 3', 21'; Miyajiki 9', 15', 15' |

South Paris Arena, Paris
Referee:
Juha Vuokila (Finland)
Romualdas Vaitiekus (Lithuania)

=== Seventh place match ===
3 September 2024
09:00

| France | 6–4 | Egypt |
|---|---|---|
| Boualia 0', 1'; Baich 3', 18'; Daudin 9'; Ouni 10' | Report | Mohamed 0', 18'; Awwad 3', 6' |

South Paris Arena, Paris
Referee:
Kazuto Ono (Japan)
Janice Dawson (Canada)

=== Fifth place match ===
3 September 2024
10:45

| United States | 3–4 | Iran |
|---|---|---|
| Merren 0'; King 16', 19' | Report | Jafari 3', 22'; Parnia Jomairan 3', 18' |

South Paris Arena, Paris
Referee:
Azhi Mahmood (Iraq)
Claude Dagenais (Canada)

=== Semi-finals ===
4 September 2024
13:30

| Brazil | 4–6 | Ukraine |
|---|---|---|
| Sousa 0'; Moreno 0' (pen.), 18', 21' | Report | Strelchyk 0'; Oliinyk 2', 10', 15', 21' (pen.), 21' |

South Paris Arena, Paris
Referee:
Azhi Mahmood (Iraq)
Kazuto Ono (Japan)

4 September 2024
18:00

| China | 5–13 | Japan |
|---|---|---|
| Yang 1', 8', 17'; Yu Deyi 21', 23' | Report | Miyajiki 0', 1', 1', 6', 8'; Kaneko 7', 7' (pen.), 7', 13', 16', 16' (pen.), 20' (pen.), 22' (pen.) |

South Paris Arena, Paris
Referee:
Antonios Christodoulos (Greece)
Raquel Aguado (Spain)

=== Bronze medal match ===
| 5 September 2024; 13:15 | Brazil | 5–3 | China | South Paris Arena, Paris; Referees: Manar Obeidat (Jordan); Juha Vuokila (Finland) |
| 5 September 2024; 13:15 | Moreno 6', 13', 15'; Sousa 13', 15' | Report | Yang 15'; Yu Deyi 17', 22' | South Paris Arena, Paris; Referees: Manar Obeidat (Jordan); Juha Vuokila (Finland) |

=== Gold medal match ===
| 5 September 2024; 19:30 | Ukraine | 3–4 (a.e.t.) | Japan | South Paris Arena, Paris; Referees: Antonios Christodoulos (Greece); Romualdas Vaitiekus (Lithuania) |
| 5 September 2024; 19:30 | Strelchyk 4', 21'; Oliinyk 8' | Report | Kaneko 2'; Miyajiki 2'; Sano 15', 25' | South Paris Arena, Paris; Referees: Antonios Christodoulos (Greece); Romualdas Vaitiekus (Lithuania) |

== Final ranking ==
| Rank | Team |
|---|---|
| 1st place, gold medalist(s) | Japan |
| 2nd place, silver medalist(s) | Ukraine |
| 3rd place, bronze medalist(s) | Brazil |
| 4 | China |
| 5 | Iran |
| 6 | United States |
| 7 | France |
| 8 | Egypt |

== See also ==
- Goalball at the 2024 Summer Paralympics – Women's tournament
