= Haruki Torii =

Japanese goalball player (born 2004)

Personal information
- Nationality: Japanese
- Born: August 7, 2004 (age 21) Odawara, Kanagawa, Japan

Sport
- Sport: Goalball
Medal record
Representing Japan
Summer Paralympics
Gold medal – first place	2024 Paris	Men's
Asian Para Games
Silver medal – second place	2022 Hangzhou	Men's

Haruki Torii (鳥居陽生, Torii Haruki; born August 7, 2004 in Odawara, Kanagawa, Japan) is a Japanese goalball player and a member of Japanese men's national team.

He was on the team that won silver in the men's tournament, at the 2022 Asian Para Games. Torii was on the team that won gold in the men's tournament, at the 2024 Summer Paralympics.
