= France men's national goalball team =

French national team, for the Paralympic sport of goalball

- Sport: Goalball
- League: IBSA
- Division: Men
- Region: IBSA Europe
- Location: France
- Colours: Red, white, blue
- Championships: Paralympic Games medals: : 0: 0: 0 World Championship medals: : 0: 0: 0

France men's national goalball team is the men's national team of France. Goalball is a team sport designed specifically for athletes with a vision impairment. The team takes part in international competitions.

== Paralympic Games ==
=== 2024 Paris ===
The team may be competing in the 2024 Summer Paralympics, from Wednesday 28 August to Sunday 8 September 2024, in the Stade Pierre de Coubertin, Paris, France. As the host nation, they receive one of the eight slots.

== World Championships ==
IBSA World Goalball Championships have been held every four years from 1978. Placing first or second in the tournament may earn a berth in the Paralympic Games goalball tournaments.

=== 1982 Indianapolis ===
The team competed in the 1982 World Championships, from Monday 28 June to 1 July 1982, at the Hinkle Fieldhouse, Butler University in Indianapolis, Indiana, United States of America. Organised by United States Association of Blind Athletes, there were twelve men's and six women's teams.

France finished eleventh. The team was coached by Charles Vetter, with some of the athletes being Dacruz and Palermo.

=== 1986 Roermond ===
The 1986 IBSA World Goalball Championships were held in Roermond, the Netherlands. There were eighteen men's and ten women's teams.

== Regional championships ==
The team competes in the IBSA Europe goalball region.

=== 1985 Olsztyn ===
The team competed at the 1985 European Championships, in Olsztyn, Poland. There were thirteen men's and six women's teams. Groups A and C are held one year, and Group B the following year. Strong teams move towards Group A.

The team finished last.

=== 1987 Milton Keynes ===
The team competed at the 1987 European Championships, in Milton Keynes, England. There were twelve men's and five women's teams.

The team finished last.

=== 1991 Lahti ===
The team competed at the 1991 European Championships, in Lahti, Finland. There were fifteen men's and eight women's teams.

The team finished second last, ahead of Sweden.

=== 2019 L'Aquila (Group C) ===
The team competed in the 2019 IBSA Goalball European C Championships from Tuesday 29 October to Saturday 2 November 2019, in L'Aquila, Abruzzo region, Italy. Athletes included Nabil Baich, Kada Coualia, Ambroise Daudin, Thomas Ramoos Martins, Haris Neirmalija, and Andre Torres.

The team ranked fifth of the six teams in Pool B (winning one and losing four of their games), ahead of Croatia, and were ranked ninth in the final standings.

== See also ==
- Parasports
- France at the Paralympics
