= Yevheniy Tsyhanenko =

Ukrainian goalball player (born 1990)

Personal information
- Nationality: Ukrainian
- Born: 10 December 1990 (age 35) Poltava, Ukrainian SSR, Soviet Union

Sport
- Sport: Goalball
Medal record
Representing Ukraine
Summer Paralympics
Silver medal – second place	2024 Paris	Men's
World Championshipss
Bronze medal – third place	2022 Matosinhos	Team
European Championships
Gold medal – first place	2023 Podgorica	Men's
Silver medal – second place	2021 Samsun	Men's
Silver medal – second place	2019 Rostock	Men's

Yevheniy Valeriyovych Tsyhanenko (Ukrainian: Євгеній Валерійович Циганенко; born 10 December 1990) is a Ukrainian goalball player and a member of the Ukrainian men's national team.

With the Ukrainian team, Tsyhanenko won the European Championship Group B in 2016, 2018 and won a silver in 2019 European Championship. He was also a part of the Ukraine roster in the men's goalball tournament of the 2020 Summer Paralympics. He took part in the 2022 Goalball World Championships, where his team won the bronze medal. He then competed in the 2023 European Championships, where his team won the men's tournament. Tsyhanenko was on the team that won silver in the men's tournament, at the 2024 Summer Paralympics.
