= Yuto Sano =

Japanese goalball player (born 2000)

Personal information
- Nationality: Japanese
- Born: June 20, 2000 (age 26) Sayama, Saitama, Japan
- Education: Juntendo University

Sport
- Sport: Goalball
Medal record
Representing Japan
Summer Paralympics
Gold medal – first place	2024 Paris	Men's
Asian Para Games
Silver medal – second place	2022 Hangzhou	Men's

Yuto Sano (佐野優人, Sano Yuto; born June 20, 2000 in Sayama, Saitama, Japan) is a Japanese goalball player and a member of Japanese men's national team.

Sano was a part of the Japan roster in the men's goalball tournament of the 2020 Summer Paralympics. He was on the team that won silver in the men's tournament, at the 2022 Asian Para Games. Sano was on the team that won gold in the men's tournament, at the 2024 Summer Paralympics, where he scored the game-winning goal in the gold medal match.
