= Tyler Merren =

American Paralympic goalball player

Personal information
- Born: May 29, 1984 (age 42) Allegan, Michigan, U.S.
- Home town: Fort Wayne, Indiana, U.S.
- Height: 6 ft 0 in (183 cm)
- Weight: 193 lb (88 kg)

Sport
- Country: United States
- Sport: Goalball
- Disability: Retinitis pigmentosa
- Disability class: B2
Medal record
Men's goalball
Representing United States
Paralympic Games
Silver medal – second place	2016 Rio de Janeiro	Team
Bronze medal – third place	2004 Athens	Team
World Championships
Silver medal – second place	2003	Team
Bronze medal – third place	2006 Spartanburg	Team
Bronze medal – third place	2014 Espoo	Team
Parapan American Games
Silver medal – second place	2011 Guadalajara	Team
Silver medal – second place	2019 Lima	Team

Tyler Merren (born May 29, 1984) is an American goalball player. His visual impairment is caused by retinitis pigmentosa. He attended Wayland High School and went to Western Michigan University to study exercise science.

His wife Leanne is also blind. He competed for the bronze-medalist US team in Goalball at the 2004 Summer Paralympics. He also competed at the 2008 Summer Paralympics and the 2016 Summer Paralympics.
