= Kazuya Kaneko =

Japanese goalball player (born 2000)

Personal information
- Nationality: Japanese
- Born: February 8, 2000 (age 26) Saitama, Saitama, Japan

Sport
- Sport: Goalball
Medal record
Representing Japan
Summer Paralympics
Gold medal – first place	2024 Paris	Men's
Asian Para Games
Silver medal – second place	2022 Hangzhou	Men's

Kazuya Kaneko (金子和也, Kaneko Kazuya; born February 8, 2000 in Saitama, Saitama, Japan) is a Japanese goalball player and a captain of Japanese men's national team.

Kaneko was a part of the Japan roster in the men's goalball tournament of the 2020 Summer Paralympics. He was on the team that won silver in the men's tournament, at the 2022 Asian Para Games. Kaneko was on the team that won gold in the men's tournament, at the 2024 Summer Paralympics.
