= Koji Miyajiki =

Japanese goalball player (born 1995)

Personal information
- Nationality: Japanese
- Born: March 20, 1995 (age 31) Suita, Osaka, Japan
- Height: 1.82 m (6 ft 0 in)

Sport
- Sport: Goalball
Medal record
Representing Japan
Summer Paralympics
Gold medal – first place	2024 Paris	Men's
Asian Para Games
Silver medal – second place	2022 Hangzhou	Men's

Koji Miyajiki (宮食行次, Miyajiki Koji; born March 20, 1995 in Suita, Osaka, Japan) is a Japanese goalball player and a member of Japanese men's national team.

Miyajiki was a part of the Japan roster in the men's goalball tournament of the 2020 Summer Paralympics. He was on the team that won silver in the men's tournament, at the 2022 Asian Para Games. Miyajiki was on the team that won gold in the men's tournament, at the 2024 Summer Paralympics.
