= Japan men's national goalball team =

Japanese national team, for the Paralympic sport of goalball

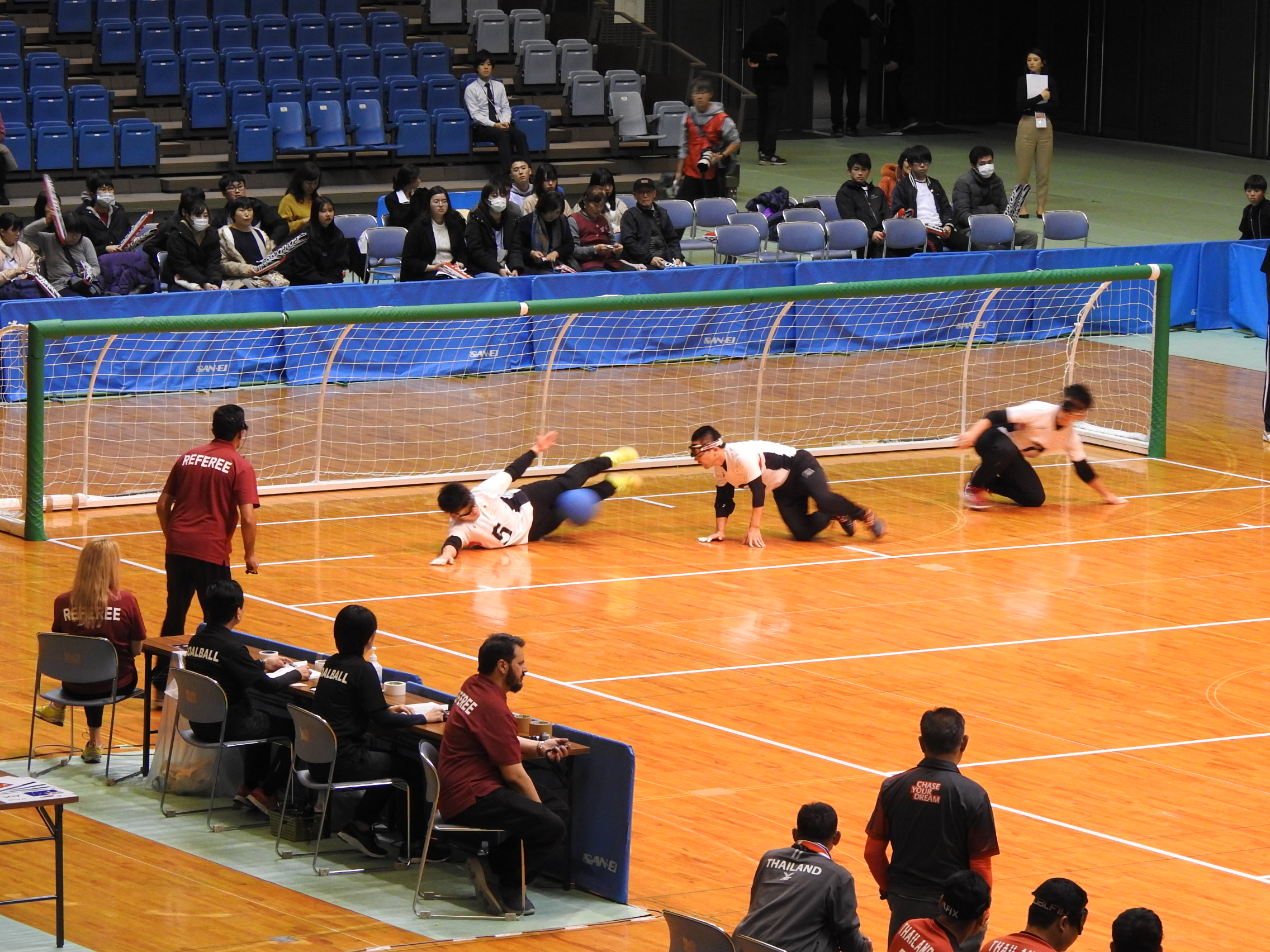
- Japan defending a throw from Thailand. Regional goalball championships, Chiba, Japan (2019).
- Sport: Goalball
- League: IBSA
- Division: Men
- Region: IBSA Asia
- Location: Japan
- Colours: Red, White, Black
- Championships: Paralympic Games medals: : 1: 0: 0 World Championship medals: : 0: 0: 0
- Parent group: Japan Goal Ball Association
- Website: www.jgba.jp

Japan men's national goalball team is the men's national team of Japan. Goalball is a team sport designed specifically for athletes with a vision impairment. Its men's team has internationally completed including at the IBSA World Goalball Championships and the Paralympic Games.

== Paralympic Games ==
=== 2020 Tokyo ===
As the host nation, the team will compete in the 2020 Summer Paralympics, with competition from Wednesday 25 August to finals on Friday 3 September 2021, in the Makuhari Messe arena, Chiba, Tokyo, Japan.

Athletes: Kazuya Kaneko (B3), Yuta Kawashima (B2), Koji Miyajiki (B3), Yuto Sano (B3), Yuji Taguchi (B2), Ryoga Yamaguchi (B1).

The following is the Japan roster in the men's goalball tournament of the 2020 Summer Paralympics.

No.	Player	Class	Date of birth (age)
1	Yuto Sano	B3	20 June 2002 (aged 19)
4	Yuji Taguchi	B2	16 February 1991 (aged 30)
5	Ryoga Yamaguchi	B1	5 January 1997 (aged 24)
7	Kazuya Kaneko	B3	8 February 2002 (aged 19)
8	Koji Miyajiki	B3	20 March 1995 (aged 26)
9	Yuta Kawashima	B2	24 September 1994 (aged 26)

Pos	Team	Pld	W	D	L	GF	GA	GD	Pts	Qualification
1	Japan (H)	4	3	0	1	37	15	+22	9	Quarter-finals
2	Brazil	4	3	0	1	35	17	+18	9	Quarter-finals
3	United States	4	2	0	2	25	35	−10	6	Quarter-finals
4	Lithuania	4	1	1	2	24	31	−7	4	Quarter-finals
5	Algeria	4	0	1	3	20	43	−23	1	

Source: TOCOG
(H) Hosts

Round-robin

25 August 2021; 13:15	Algeria	4–13	Japan	Makuhari Messe, Tokyo; Referees: Bas Spaans (Netherlands), Woradet Kultawongwattana (Thailand)
25 August 2021; 13:15	Belhouchat 3 Larbi 1	Report	Kaneko 7 Miyajiki 3 Sano 2 Yamaguchi 1	Makuhari Messe, Tokyo; Referees: Bas Spaans (Netherlands), Woradet Kultawongwattana (Thailand)

27 August 2021; 13:15	Japan	11–1	United States	Makuhari Messe, Tokyo; Referees: Reza Dehghan (Iran), Woradet Kultawongwattana (Thailand)
27 August 2021; 13:15	Sano 6 Miyajiki 3 Kaneko 2	Report	Walker 1	Makuhari Messe, Tokyo; Referees: Reza Dehghan (Iran), Woradet Kultawongwattana (Thailand)

28 August 2021; 14:45	Lithuania	2–10	Japan	Makuhari Messe, Tokyo; Referees: Warrick Jackes (Australia), Bas Spaans (Netherlands)
28 August 2021; 14:45	Montvydas 1 Pavliukianec 1	Report	Sano 4 Miyajiki 3 Kaneko 2 Yamaguchi 1	Makuhari Messe, Tokyo; Referees: Warrick Jackes (Australia), Bas Spaans (Netherlands)

29 August 2021; 09:00	Japan	3–8	Brazil	Makuhari Messe, Tokyo; Referees: Reza Dehghan (Iran), Launel Scott (Canada)
29 August 2021; 09:00	Yamaguchi 2 Sano 1	Report	Sousa 5 Moreno 3	Makuhari Messe, Tokyo; Referees: Reza Dehghan (Iran), Launel Scott (Canada)

== World Championships ==
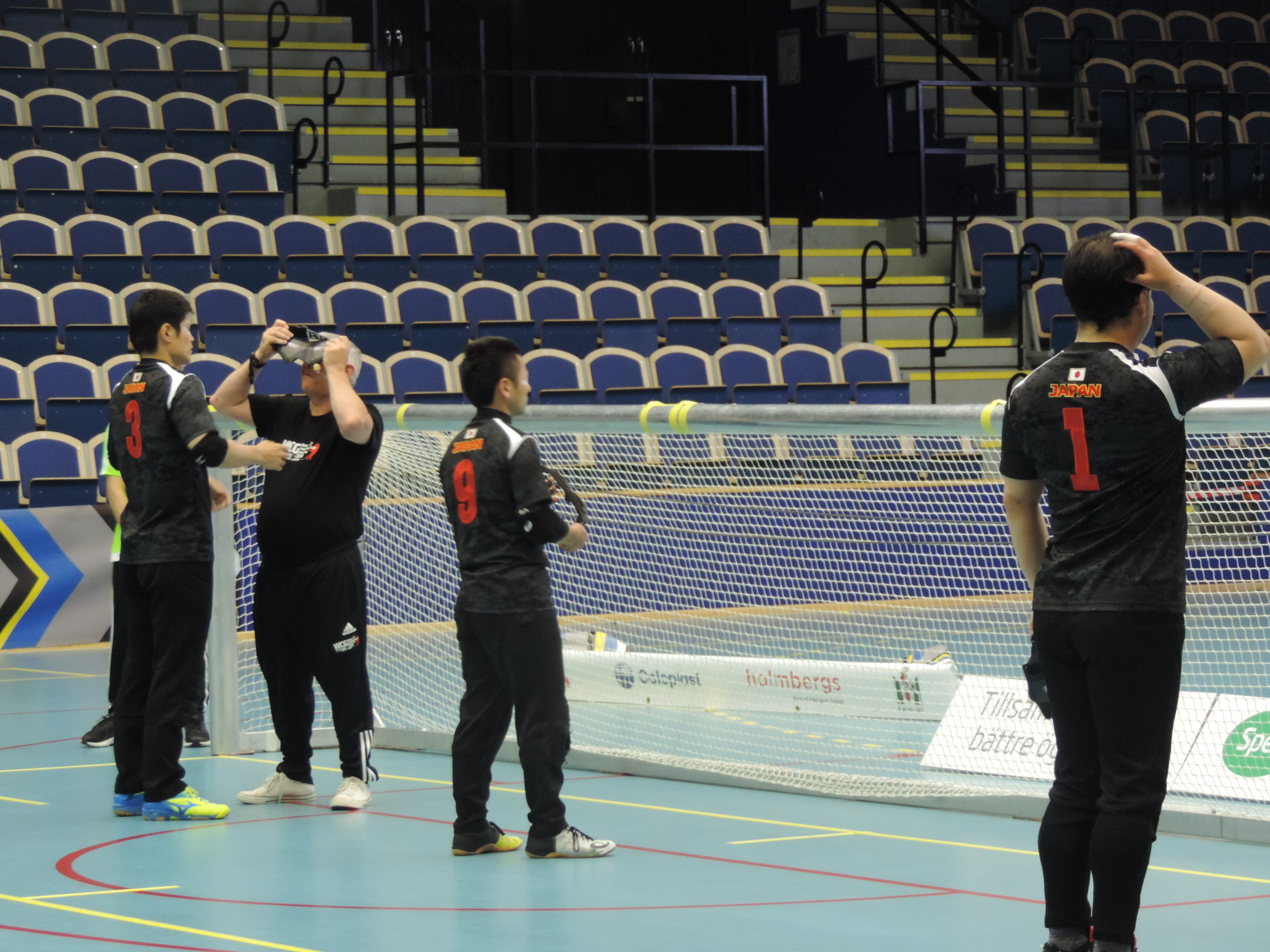
Eyeshade check at start of half, of the Japanese men's goalball team. World Goalball Championships, Malmö, Sweden (2018).

=== 2002 Rio de Janeiro ===
The team competed in the 2002 World Championships, in Rio de Janeiro, Brazil. From Pool B, the team placed last.

=== 2006 Spartanburg ===
The team competed in the 2002 World Championships, in Spartanburg, South Carolina, United States of America.

=== 2010 Sheffield ===
The team did not compete in 2010 World Championships in Sheffield, England.

=== 2014 Espoo ===
The team competed in the 2014 World Championships from 30 June to 5 July 2014, in Espoo, Finland. They placed seventh in Pool B.

Athletes: Yoshu Nobusawa (#1), Masatoshi Ito (#3), Maki Tsujimura (#6), Hiroshi Kobayashi (#7), Kento Torii (#8), and Yuta Kawashima (#9).

=== 2018 Malmö ===
The team competed in the 2018 World Championships from 3 to 8 June 2018, in Malmö, Sweden. They placed fifth in Pool B, and were ninth in the final standings.

=== 2022 Matosinhos ===
The team competed in the 2022 World Championships from 7 to 16 December 2022, at the Centro de Desportos e Congressos de Matosinhos, Portugal. There were sixteen men's and sixteen women's teams. They placed third in Pool C, and sixth in final standings.

== IBSA World Games ==
=== 2011 Antalya ===
The team competed in the 2011 IBSA World Games from 1 to 10 April 2011, in Antalya, Turkey. They placed seventh in Group A, and were fourteenth in the final standings.

=== 2015 Seoul ===
The team competed in the 2015 IBSA World Games from 10 to 17 May 2015, in Seoul, South Korea. They placed third in Group B, and were eighth in the final standings.

== Regional championships ==
The team competed in IBSA Asia goalball region, and from January 2010 became part of the IBSA Asia-Pacific goalball competition region.

=== 2013 Beijing ===
The team competed in the 2013 IBSA Asia Pacific Goalball Regional Championships, from 11 to 16 November 2013, in Beijing, China. Of the six men's teams (Australia, China, Iran, Japan, Mongolia, Thailand), Japan lost to Iran 4:14 to take silver.

=== 2015 Hangzhou ===
The team competed in the 2015 IBSA Asia Pacific Goalball Regional Championships, from 8 to 12 November 2015, in the China National Goalball Training Centre, Hangzhou, China. Of the five men's teams (Australia, China, Iran, Japan, Korea), Japan placed fourth, ahead of Australia.

=== 2017 Bangkok ===
The team competed in the 2017 IBSA Asia/Pacific Goalball Regional Championships, from Monday 21 to Saturday 26 August 2017, in the Thai-Japan Sports Stadium, Din Daeng, Bangkok, Thailand. They placed second in Pool A, and won the bronze medal match against Australia, 11:3.

Athletes: Masatoshi Ito (#3), Yuta Kawashima (centre, #9), Hiroshi Kobayashi (#7), Yoshu Nobusawa (#1), Yuji Taguchi (#8), and Ryoga Yamaguchi (#5).

=== 2019 Chiba ===
The team competed in the 2019 IBSA Goalball Asia-Pacific Regional Championships, from Thursday 5 to Tuesday 10 December 2019, in the Chiba Port Arena, Chiba, Japan. They placed third in the round-robin, and third overall. Athletes were Kazuya Kaneko (#7), Yuta Kawashima (#9), Koji Miyajiki (#2), Yuto Sano (#4), Yuji Taguchi (#6), and Ryoga Yamaguchi (#5).

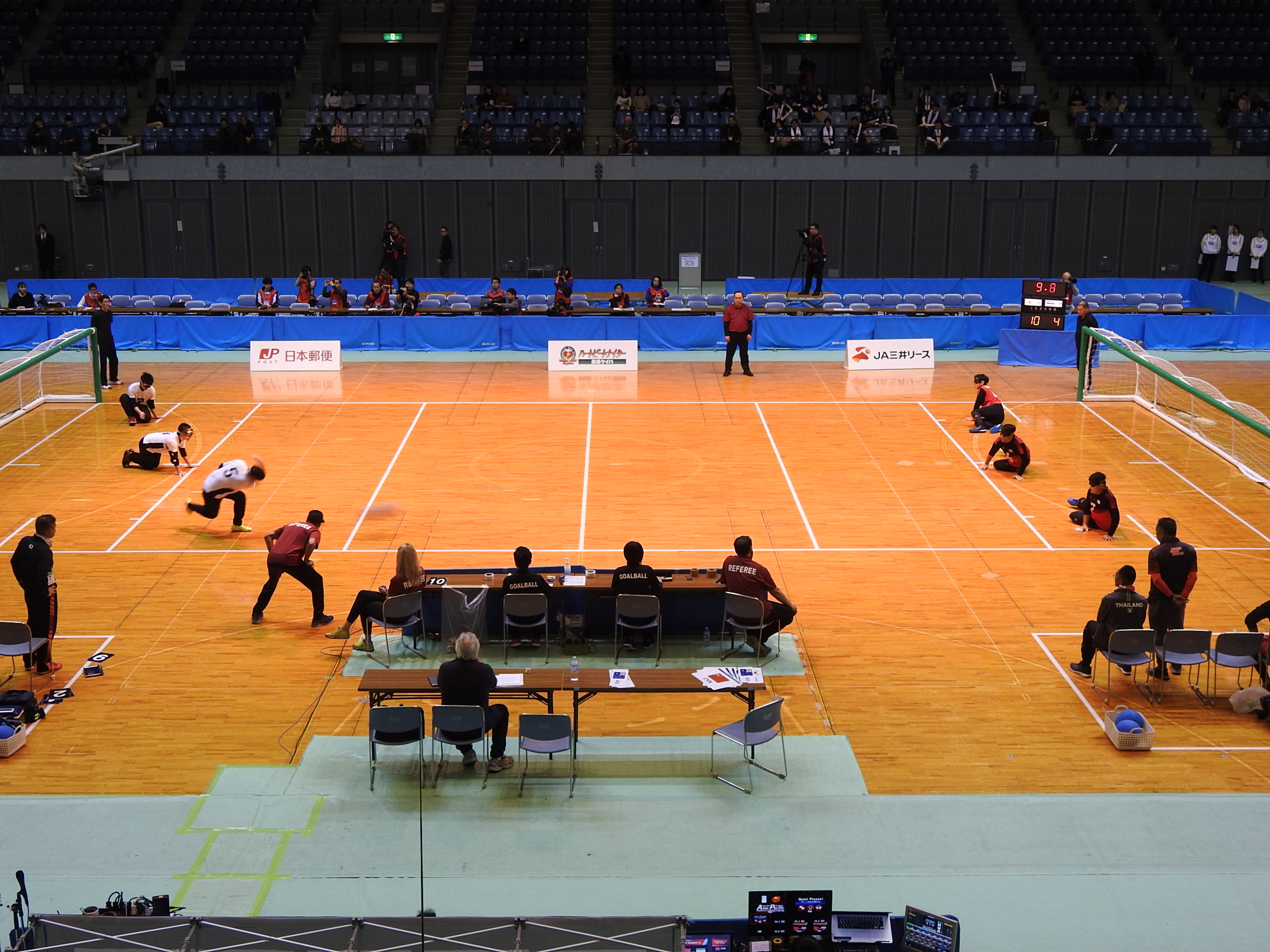
Japan throwing towards Thailand (Dec 2019).

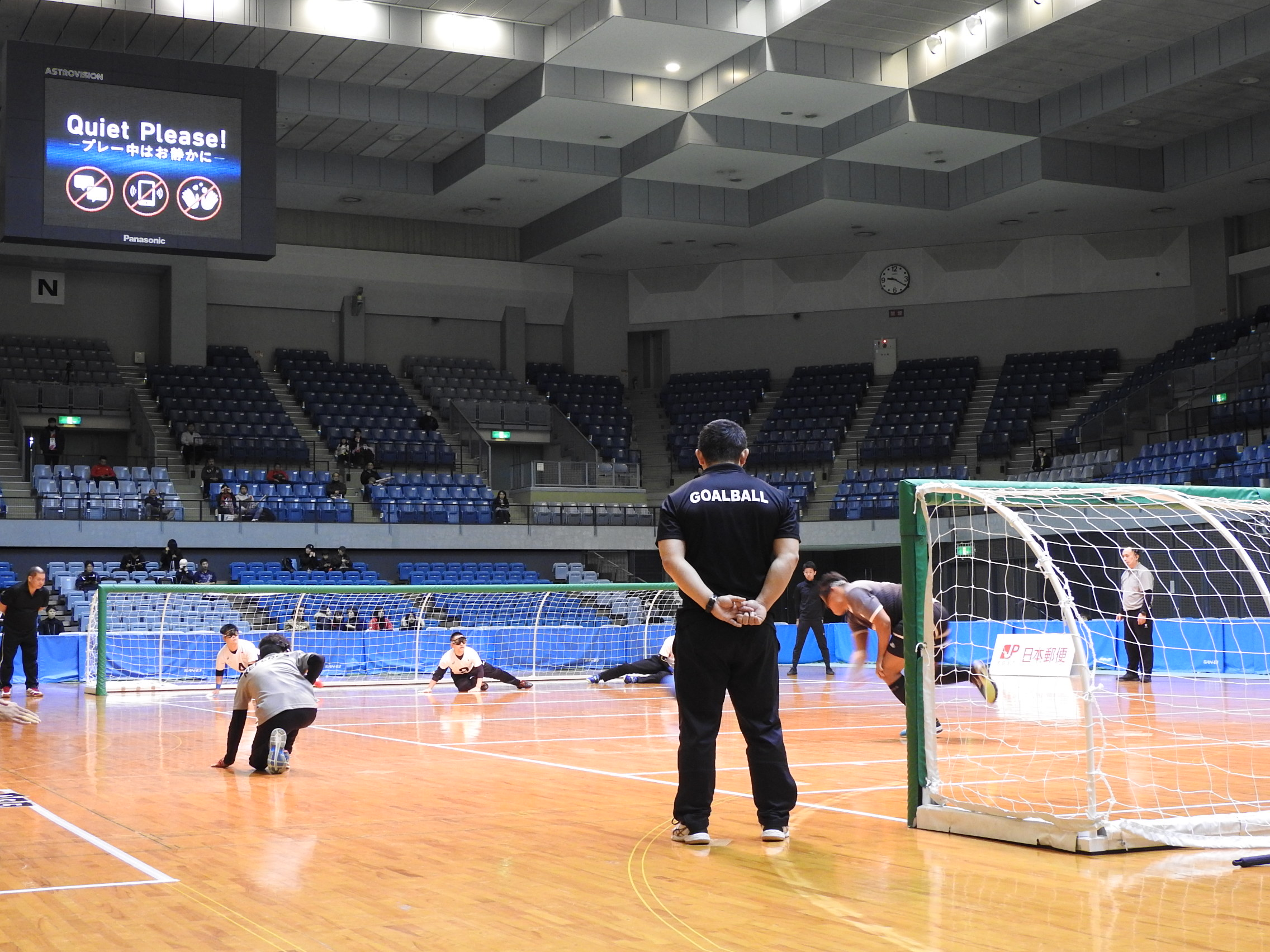
Indonesia throwing towards Japan (Dec 2019).

=== 2022 Bahrain ===
Due to the COVID-19 pandemic, the 2021 IBSA Goalball Asia-Pacific Regional Championships were moved from November 2021 to 21 March 2022 in Asan, South Korea. The championships was finally held at the Bahrain Sports Federation for Disabilities Sports Centre, in Riffa, Bahrain from Monday 25 July 2022 to Friday 29 July 2022. The top two teams of each division are eligible for the World Championships in December 2022.

There were five men's teams: Australia, Iran, Japan, South Korea, Thailand. They placed first in the round-robin, and first overall.

Athletes: #3 Ito Masatoshi, #5 Yamaguchi Ryoga, #6 Sano Yuto, #7 Kaneko Kazuya, #8 Miyajiki Koji, #9 Kawashima Yuta.
Team staff: Coach Rikiya Kudo, assistant coach Todo Ai, staff Mikami Yukako.

== See also ==
- Disabled sports
- Japan women's national goalball team
- Japan at the Paralympics
