= Badminton at the 2022 Asian Para Games – Men's singles WH2 =

Badminton's men's singles WH2 at the 2022 Asian Para Games
- Venue: Binjiang Gymnasium, Hangzhou
- Dates: 20 – 27 August 2023
- Competitors: 17 from 11 nations

Medalists
| gold medal | Daiki Kajiwara | Japan |
| silver medal | Yu Soo-young | South Korea |
| bronze medal | Chan Ho Yuen | Hong Kong |
| bronze medal | Kim Jung-jun | South Korea |

The men's singles WH2 badminton tournament at the 2022 Asian Para Games is playing from 20 to 27 October 2023 in Binjiang Gymnasium, Hangzhou. A total of 17 players competed at the tournament, five of whom was seeded.

== Competition schedule ==
Plays are taking place between 20 and 27 October 2023.

| GS | Group stage | R16 | Round of 16 | ¼ | Quarterfinals | ½ | Semifinals | F | Final |

| Events | Fri 20 | Sat 21 | Sun 22 | Mon 23 | Tue 24 | Wed 25 | Thu 26 | Fri 27 |
|---|---|---|---|---|---|---|---|---|
| Men's singles WH2 | GS | GS | | GS | R16 | ¼ | ½ | F |

== Seeds ==
The following players were seeded:

1. Daiki Kajiwara (JPN) (champion; gold medalist)
2. Kim Jung-jun (KOR) (semi-finals; bronze medalist)
3. Chan Ho Yuen (HKG) (semi-finals; bronze medalist)
4. Yu Soo-young (KOR) (final; silver medalist)
5. Matsumotmo Takumi (JPN) (quarter-finals)

== Group stage ==
=== Group A ===
| Pos | Team | Pld | W | L | GF | GA | GD | PF | PA | PD | Qualification |
|---|---|---|---|---|---|---|---|---|---|---|---|
| 1 | Daiki Kajiwara (JPN) [1] | 2 | 2 | 0 | 4 | 0 | +4 | 84 | 11 | +73 | Qualification to elimination stage |
| 2 | Aphichat Sumpradit (THA) | 2 | 1 | 1 | 2 | 2 | 0 | 50 | 68 | −18 | Qualification to elimination stage |
| 3 | Karrar Ghalwah (IRQ) | 2 | 0 | 2 | 0 | 4 | −4 | 29 | 84 | −55 | |

Source: Group A – standings

| Date | | Score | | Game 1 | Game 2 | Game 3 |
|---|---|---|---|---|---|---|
| 20 Oct | Aphichat Sumpradit (Thailand) | 2–0 | (Iraq) Karrar Ghalwah | 21–11 | 21–15 | |
| 21 Oct | Daiki Kajiwara (Japan) | 2–0 | (Thailand) Aphichat Sumpradit | 21–6 | 21–2 | |
| 23 Oct | Daiki Kajiwara (Japan) | 2–0 | (Iraq) Karrar Ghalwah | 21–2 | 21–1 | |

=== Group B ===
| Pos | Team | Pld | W | L | GF | GA | GD | PF | PA | PD | Qualification |
|---|---|---|---|---|---|---|---|---|---|---|---|
| 1 | Kim Jung-jun (KOR) [2] | 2 | 2 | 0 | 4 | 0 | +4 | 84 | 45 | +39 | Qualification to elimination stage |
| 2 | Mai Jianpeng (CHN) (H) | 2 | 1 | 1 | 2 | 2 | 0 | 66 | 64 | +2 | Qualification to elimination stage |
| 3 | Dumnern Junthong (THA) | 2 | 0 | 2 | 0 | 4 | −4 | 43 | 84 | −41 | |

Source: Group B – standings
(H) Host

| Date | | Score | | Game 1 | Game 2 | Game 3 |
|---|---|---|---|---|---|---|
| 20 Oct | Mai Jianpeng (China) | 2–0 | (Thailand) Dumnern Junthong | 21–14 | 21–8 | |
| 21 Oct | Kim Jung-jun (South Korea) | 2–0 | (China) Mai Jianpeng | 21–14 | 21–10 | |
| 23 Oct | Kim Jung-jun (South Korea) | 2–0 | (Thailand) Dumnern Junthong | 21–8 | 21–13 | |

=== Group C ===
| Pos | Team | Pld | W | L | GF | GA | GD | PF | PA | PD | Qualification |
|---|---|---|---|---|---|---|---|---|---|---|---|
| 1 | Chan Ho Yuen (HKG) [3/4] | 2 | 2 | 0 | 4 | 0 | +4 | 84 | 23 | +61 | Qualification to elimination stage |
| 2 | Supriadi (INA) | 2 | 1 | 1 | 2 | 2 | 0 | 59 | 59 | 0 | Qualification to elimination stage |
| 3 | Mohammed Al-Ameer (IRQ) | 2 | 0 | 2 | 0 | 4 | −4 | 23 | 84 | −61 | |

Source: Group C – standings

| Date | | Score | | Game 1 | Game 2 | Game 3 |
|---|---|---|---|---|---|---|
| 20 Oct | Supriadi (Indonesia) | 2–0 | (Iraq) Mohammed Al-Ameer | 21–8 | 21–9 | |
| 21 Oct | Chan Ho Yuen (Hong Kong) | 2–0 | (Indonesia) Supriadi | 21–8 | 21–9 | |
| 23 Oct | Chan Ho Yuen (Hong Kong) | 2–0 | (Iraq) Mohammed Al-Ameer | 21–5 | 21–1 | |

=== Group D ===
| Pos | Team | Pld | W | L | GF | GA | GD | PF | PA | PD | Qualification |
|---|---|---|---|---|---|---|---|---|---|---|---|
| 1 | Yu Soo-young (KOR) [3/4] | 3 | 3 | 0 | 6 | 0 | +6 | 126 | 53 | +73 | Qualification to elimination stage |
| 2 | Zhao Xin (CHN) (H) | 3 | 2 | 1 | 4 | 2 | +2 | 115 | 84 | +31 | Qualification to elimination stage |
| 3 | Wiwin Andri (INA) | 3 | 1 | 2 | 2 | 4 | −2 | 95 | 88 | +7 | |
| 4 | Mohamed Ahmed Alzarooni (UAE) | 3 | 0 | 3 | 0 | 6 | −6 | 15 | 126 | −111 | |

Source: Group D – standings
(H) Host

| Date | | Score | | Game 1 | Game 2 | Game 3 |
|---|---|---|---|---|---|---|
| 20 Oct | Yu Soo-young (South Korea) | 2–0 | (United Arab Emirates) Mohamed Ahmed Alzarooni | 21–1 | 21–1 | |
| 20 Oct | Zhao Xin (China) | 2–0 | (Indonesia) Wiwin Andri | 21–12 | 22–20 | |
| 21 Oct | Yu Soo-young (South Korea) | 2–0 | (China) Zhao Xin | 21–16 | 21–14 | |
| 21 Oct | Wiwin Andri (Indonesia) | 2–0 | (United Arab Emirates) Mohamed Ahmed Alzarooni | 21–2 | 21–1 | |
| 23 Oct | Yu Soo-young (South Korea) | 2–0 | (Indonesia) Wiwin Andri | 21–15 | 21–6 | |
| 23 Oct | Zhao Xin (China) | 2–0 | (United Arab Emirates) Mohamed Ahmed Alzarooni | 21–4 | 21–6 | |

=== Group E ===
| Pos | Team | Pld | W | L | GF | GA | GD | PF | PA | PD | Qualification |
|---|---|---|---|---|---|---|---|---|---|---|---|
| 1 | Noor Azwan Noorlan (MAS) | 3 | 3 | 0 | 6 | 2 | +4 | 160 | 126 | +34 | Qualification to elimination stage |
| 2 | Matsumotmo Takumi (JPN) [5] | 3 | 2 | 1 | 5 | 2 | +3 | 143 | 106 | +37 | Qualification to elimination stage |
| 3 | Trương Ngọc Bình (VIE) | 3 | 1 | 2 | 3 | 4 | −1 | 115 | 130 | −15 | |
| 4 | Abu Hubaida (IND) | 3 | 0 | 3 | 0 | 6 | −6 | 70 | 126 | −56 | |

Source: Group E – standings

| Date | | Score | | Game 1 | Game 2 | Game 3 |
|---|---|---|---|---|---|---|
| 20 Oct | Matsumotmo Takumi (Japan) | 2–0 | (Vietnam) Trương Ngọc Bình | 21–13 | 21–13 | |
| 20 Oct | Abu Hubaida (India) | 0–2 | (Malaysia) Noor Azwan Noorlan | 12–21 | 8–21 | |
| 21 Oct | Matsumotmo Takumi (Japan) | 2–0 | (India) Abu Hubaida | 21–11 | 21–12 | |
| 21 Oct | Noor Azwan Noorlan (Malaysia) | 2–1 | (Vietnam) Trương Ngọc Bình | 21–19 | 19–21 | 21–7 |
| 23 Oct | Matsumotmo Takumi (Japan) | 1–2 | (Malaysia) Noor Azwan Noorlan | 18–21 | 21–14 | 20–22 |
| 23 Oct | Abu Hubaida (India) | 0–2 | (Vietnam) Trương Ngọc Bình | 14–21 | 13–21 | |

== Elimination round ==
Top two ranked in each group qualified to the elimination round, the draw was decided after the previous round finished.

Round of 16
Supriadi (INA) | 21 | 21
Aphichat Sumpradit (THA) | 9 | 9
Mai Jianpeng (CHN) | 21 | 21
Zhao Xin (CHN) | 17 | 15

Quarter-finals
1 | Daiki Kajiwara (JPN) | 21 | 21
Supriadi (INA) | 19 | 11
3/4 | Chan Ho Yuen (HKG) | 21 | 21
Noor Azwan Noorlan (MAS) | 9 | 9
5 | Matsumotmo Takumi (JPN) | 15 | 10
3/4 | Yu Soo-young (KOR) | 21 | 21
Mai Jianpeng (CHN) | 15 | 10
2 | Kim Jung-jun (KOR) | 21 | 21

Semi-finals
1 | Daiki Kajiwara (JPN) | 22 | 21
3/4 | Chan Ho Yuen (HKG) | 20 | 11
3/4 | Yu Soo-young (KOR) | 21 | 21
2 | Kim Jung-jun (KOR) | 17 | 18

Final
1 | Daiki Kajiwara (JPN) | 21 | 21
3/4 | Yu Soo-young (KOR) | 15 | 9
