= 2019 BWF Para-Badminton World Championships – Men's singles WH2 =

Men's singles WH2 at the 2019 BWF Para-Badminton World Championships
- Venue: St. Jakobshalle
- Location: Basel, Switzerland
- Dates: 20–25 August

Medalists
gold medal	Kim Jung-jun	South Korea
silver medal	Chan Ho Yuen	Hong Kong
bronze medal	Atsuya Watanabe	Japan
bronze medal	Kim Kyung-hoon	South Korea

The men's singles WH2 tournament of the 2019 BWF Para-Badminton World Championships took place from 20 to 25 August.

== Seeds ==
1. (South Korea) Kim Jung-jun (world champion)
2. (Hong Kong) Chan Ho Yuen (final)
3. (England) Martin Rooke (quarter-finals)
4. (South Korea) Kim Kyung-hoon (quarter-finals)
5. (Israel) Amir Levi (quarter-finals)
6. (Brazil) Julio César Godoy (first round)
7. (India) Sanjeev Kumar (group stage)
8. (Germany) Rick Cornell Hellmann (first round)

== Group stage ==
All times are local (UTC+2).

=== Group A ===
Pos	Team	Pld	W	L	GF	GA	GD	PF	PA	PD	Pts	Qualification
1	(South Korea) Kim Jung-jun [1]	2	2	0	4	0	+4	84	37	+47	2	Advance to Knock-out stage
2	(Japan) Atsuya Watanabe	2	1	1	2	2	0	58	67	−9	1	Advance to Knock-out stage
3	(Turkey) Luca Olgiati	2	0	2	0	4	−4	46	84	−38	0	

Source: TS

Date		Score		Set 1	Set 2	Set 3
20 Aug; 12:00	Kim Jung-jun (South Korea)	2–0	(Japan) Atsuya Watanabe	21–10	21–6	
21 Aug; 12:00	Luca Olgiati (Turkey)	0–2	(Japan) Atsuya Watanabe	9–21	16–21	
22 Aug; 12:00	Kim Jung-jun (South Korea)	2–0	(Turkey) Luca Olgiati	21–13	21–8	

=== Group B ===
Pos	Team	Pld	W	L	GF	GA	GD	PF	PA	PD	Pts	Qualification
1	(Hong Kong) Chan Ho Yuen [2]	2	2	0	4	0	+4	84	38	+46	2	Advance to Knock-out stage
2	(Japan) Daiki Kajiwara	2	1	1	2	2	0	64	65	−1	1	Advance to Knock-out stage
3	(Russia) Ilya Pargeev	2	0	2	0	4	−4	39	84	−45	0	

Source: TS

Date		Score		Set 1	Set 2	Set 3
20 Aug; 12:30	Chan Ho Yuen (Hong Kong)	2–0	(Japan) Daiki Kajiwara	21–9	21–13	
21 Aug; 12:00	Ilya Pargeev (Russia)	0–2	(Japan) Daiki Kajiwara	10–21	13–21	
22 Aug; 12:30	Chan Ho Yuen (Hong Kong)	2–0	(Russia) Ilya Pargeev	21–11	21–5	

=== Group C ===
Pos	Team	Pld	W	L	GF	GA	GD	PF	PA	PD	Pts	Qualification
1	(South Korea) Kim Kyung-hoon [3/4]	2	2	0	4	0	+4	84	20	+64	2	Advance to Knock-out stage
2	(England) Gobi Ranganathan	2	1	1	2	2	0	54	56	−2	1	Advance to Knock-out stage
3	(Egypt) Nasr Youssif Elsayed	2	0	2	0	4	−4	22	84	−62	0	

Source: TS

Date		Score		Set 1	Set 2	Set 3
20 Aug; 12:30	Kim Kyung-hoon (South Korea)	2–0	(Egypt) Nasr Youssif Elsayed	21–2	21–6	
21 Aug; 12:30	Gobi Ranganathan (England)	2–0	(Egypt) Nasr Youssif Elsayed	21–9	21–5	
22 Aug; 12:30	Kim Kyung-hoon (South Korea)	2–0	(England) Gobi Ranganathan	21–5	21–7	

=== Group D ===
Pos	Team	Pld	W	L	GF	GA	GD	PF	PA	PD	Pts	Qualification
1	(England) Martin Rooke [3/4]	3	3	0	6	0	+6	126	43	+83	3	Advance to Knock-out stage
2	(France) Thomas Jakobs	3	2	1	4	2	+2	112	93	+19	2	Advance to Knock-out stage
3	(Australia) Grant Manzoney	3	1	2	2	4	−2	75	114	−39	1	
4	(Italy) Piero Rosario Suma	3	0	3	0	6	−6	63	126	−63	0	

Source: TS

Date		Score		Set 1	Set 2	Set 3
20 Aug; 12:30	Grant Manzoney (Australia)	2–0	(France) Thomas Jakobs	11–21	15–21	
20 Aug; 13:00	Martin Rooke (England)	2–0	(Italy) Piero Rosario Suma	21–4	21–4	
21 Aug; 12:30	Martin Rooke (England)	2–0	(France) Thomas Jakobs	21–19	21–9	
21 Aug; 12:30	Grant Manzoney (Australia)	2–0	(Italy) Piero Rosario Suma	21–17	21–13	
22 Aug; 12:30	Martin Rooke (England)	2–0	(Australia) Grant Manzoney	21–5	21–2	
22 Aug; 13:00	Thomas Jakobs (France)	2–0	(Italy) Piero Rosario Suma	21–12	21–13	

=== Group E ===
Pos	Team	Pld	W	L	GF	GA	GD	PF	PA	PD	Pts	Qualification
1	(Israel) Amir Levi [5/8]	3	3	0	6	0	+6	126	68	+58	3	Advance to Knock-out stage
2	(Thailand) Junthong Dumnern	3	2	1	4	2	+2	113	85	+28	2	Advance to Knock-out stage
3	(Canada) Bernard Lapointe	3	1	2	2	4	−2	88	97	−9	1	
4	(Finland) Harri Isomäki	3	0	3	0	6	−6	49	126	−77	0	

Source: TS

Date		Score		Set 1	Set 2	Set 3
20 Aug; 13:00	Harri Isomäki (Finland)	0–2	(Thailand) Junthong Dumnern	10–21	6–21	
20 Aug; 13:00	Amir Levi (Israel)	2–0	(Canada) Bernard Lapointe	21–9	21–10	
21 Aug; 13:00	Amir Levi (Israel)	2–0	(Thailand) Junthong Dumnern	21–14	21–15	
21 Aug; 13:00	Harri Isomäki (Finland)	0–2	(Canada) Bernard Lapointe	5–21	8–21	
22 Aug; 13:00	Amir Levi (Israel)	2–0	(Finland) Harri Isomäki	21–6	21–14	
22 Aug; 13:00	Junthong Dumnern (Thailand)	2–0	(Canada) Bernard Lapointe	21–14	21–13	

=== Group F ===
Pos	Team	Pld	W	L	GF	GA	GD	PF	PA	PD	Pts	Qualification
1	(Finland) Thomas Puska	2	2	0	4	1	+3	102	56	+46	2	Advance to Knock-out stage
2	(Brazil) Julio César Godoy [5/8]	2	1	1	3	2	+1	84	87	−3	1	Advance to Knock-out stage
3	(Switzerland) Christian Hamböck	2	0	2	0	4	−4	41	84	−43	0	
4	(Nigeria) Seyi Dada Dixon (N)	0	0	0	0	0	0	0	0	0	0	

Source: TS
(N) Did not start

Date		Score		Set 1	Set 2	Set 3
20 Aug; 13:30	Julio César Godoy (Brazil)	2–0	(Switzerland) Christian Hamböck	21–14	21–13	
21 Aug; 13:00	Thomas Puska (Finland)	2–0	(Switzerland) Christian Hamböck	21–5	21–9	
22 Aug; 13:00	Julio César Godoy (Brazil)	1–2	(Finland) Thomas Puska	21–18	8–21	13–21

=== Group G ===
Pos	Team	Pld	W	L	GF	GA	GD	PF	PA	PD	Pts	Qualification
1	(China) Mai Jianpeng	3	3	0	6	0	+6	130	63	+67	3	Advance to Knock-out stage
2	(Vietnam) Trương Ngọc Bình	3	2	1	4	2	+2	115	99	+16	2	Advance to Knock-out stage
3	(India) Sanjeev Kumar [5/8]	3	1	2	2	4	−2	96	104	−8	1	
4	(Russia) Iurii Sorokin	3	0	3	0	6	−6	51	126	−75	0	

Source: TS

Date		Score		Set 1	Set 2	Set 3
20 Aug; 13:30	Mai Jianpeng (China)	2–0	(Vietnam) Trương Ngọc Bình	21–8	25–23	
20 Aug; 13:30	Sanjeev Kumar (India)	2–0	(Russia) Iurii Sorokin	21–5	21–15	
21 Aug; 13:00	Sanjeev Kumar (India)	0–2	(Vietnam) Trương Ngọc Bình	19–21	18–21	
21 Aug; 13:30	Mai Jianpeng (China)	2–0	(Russia) Iurii Sorokin	21–9	21–6	
22 Aug; 13:30	Sanjeev Kumar (India)	0–2	(China) Mai Jianpeng	8–21	9–21	
22 Aug; 13:30	Trương Ngọc Bình (Vietnam)	2–0	(Russia) Iurii Sorokin	21–7	21–9	

=== Group H ===
Pos	Team	Pld	W	L	GF	GA	GD	PF	PA	PD	Pts	Qualification
1	(China) Zhao Xin	3	3	0	6	0	+6	126	67	+59	3	Advance to Knock-out stage
2	(Germany) Rick Cornell Hellmann [5/8]	3	2	1	4	2	+2	115	91	+24	2	Advance to Knock-out stage
3	(Thailand) Aphichat Sumpradit	3	1	2	2	4	−2	88	109	−21	1	
4	(India) Abu Hubaida	3	0	3	0	6	−6	64	126	−62	0	

Source: TS

Date		Score		Set 1	Set 2	Set 3
20 Aug; 14:00	Zhao Xin (China)	2–0	(India) Abu Hubaida	21–6	21–15	
20 Aug; 1:00	Rick Cornell Hellmann (Germany)	2–0	(Thailand) Aphichat Sumpradit	21–17	21–14	
21 Aug; 13:30	Rick Cornell Hellmann (Germany)	2–0	(India) Abu Hubaida	21–6	21–12	
21 Aug; 13:30	Zhao Xin (China)	2–0	(Thailand) Aphichat Sumpradit	21–7	21–8	
22 Aug; 13:30	Rick Cornell Hellmann (Germany)	0–2	(China) Zhao Xin	13–21	18–21	
22 Aug; 14:00	Abu Hubaida (India)	0–2	(Thailand) Aphichat Sumpradit	13–21	12–21	

== Knock-out stage ==
First Round
1	(South Korea) Kim Jung-jun	21	21
(Thailand) Junthong Dumnern	11	11
(China) Mai Jianpeng	21	21
(England) Gobi Ranganathan	11	5
3/4	(England) Martin Rooke	21	21
5/8	(Germany) Rick Cornell Hellmann	15	17
(Finland) Thomas Puska	11	17
(Japan) Atsuya Watanabe	21	21
5/8	(Brazil) Julio César Godoy	12	9
5/8	(Israel) Amir Levi	21	21
(Japan) Daiki Kajiwara	21	19	16
3/4	(South Korea) Kim Kyung-hoon	19	21	21
(Vietnam) Trương Ngọc Bình	17	10
(China) Zhao Xin	21	21
(France) Thomas Jakobs	7	13
2	(Hong Kong) Chan Ho Yuen	21	21

Quarter-finals
1	(South Korea) Kim Jung-jun	21	21
(China) Mai Jianpeng	13	8
3/4	(England) Martin Rooke	21	14	19
(Japan) Atsuya Watanabe	13	21	21
5/8	(Israel) Amir Levi	9	9
3/4	(South Korea) Kim Kyung-hoon	21	21
(China) Zhao Xin	11	16
2	(Hong Kong) Chan Ho Yuen	21	21

Semi-finals
1	(South Korea) Kim Jung-jun	21	21
(Japan) Atsuya Watanabe	19	13
3/4	(South Korea) Kim Kyung-hoon	20	21
2	(Hong Kong) Chan Ho Yuen	22	23

Final
1	(South Korea) Kim Jung-jun	21	13	21
2	(Hong Kong) Chan Ho Yuen	18	21	18
