= Badminton at the 2024 Summer Paralympics – Men's singles WH2 =

Badminton competition

Men's singles WH2 at the XVII Paralympic Games
- Venue: Arena Porte de La Chapelle, Paris
- Dates: 30 August 2024 – 2 September 2024
- Competitors: 12 from 10 nations

Medalists
1st place, gold medalist(s)		Daiki Kajiwara	Japan
2nd place, silver medalist(s)		Chan Ho Yuen	Hong Kong
3rd place, bronze medalist(s)		Kim Jung-jun	South Korea

The men's singles WH2 tournament at the 2024 Summer Paralympics in France will take place between 30 August and 2 September 2024 at Arena Porte de La Chapelle.

== Classification ==
- WH2
  Players have impairment in one or both lower limbs and minimal or no impairment of the trunk and also require wheelchair

== Seeds ==
These were the seeds for this event:

1. Daiki Kajiwara (JPN) (gold medalist)
2. Chan Ho Yuen (HKG) (silver medalist)
3. Kim Jung-jun (KOR) (bronze medalist)
4. Yu Soo-young (KOR) (fourth place)

== Group stage ==
The draw of the group stage revealed on 24 August 2024. The group stage will be played from 30 to 31 August. The top winner of each group advanced to the knockout rounds.

=== Group A ===
Pos	Team	Pld	W	L	GF	GA	GD	PF	PA	PD	Pts	Qualification
1	Daiki Kajiwara (JPN)	2	2	0	4	0	+4	84	42	+42	2	Semi-finals
2	Takumi Matsumoto (JPN)	2	1	1	2	2	0	64	67	−3	1	
3	Luca Olgiati (SUI)	2	0	2	0	4	−4	45	84	−39	0	

First match(es) will be played: 30 August 2024. Source: COJOP2024

Date	Time	Player 1	Score	Player 2	Set 1	Set 2	Set 3	Report
Aug 30	9:35	Daiki Kajiwara (Japan)	2–0	(Japan) Takumi Matsumoto	21–4	21–18		Report
Aug 30	20:21	Takumi Matsumoto (Japan)	2–0	(Switzerland) Luca Olgiati	21–10	21–15		Report
Aug 31	16:05	Daiki Kajiwara (Japan)	2–0	(Switzerland) Luca Olgiati	21–10	21–10		Report

=== Group B ===
Pos	Team	Pld	W	L	GF	GA	GD	PF	PA	PD	Pts	Qualification
1	Kim Jung-jun (KOR)	2	2	0	4	1	+3	106	67	+39	2	Semi-finals
2	Thomas Jakobs (FRA) (H)	2	1	1	3	2	+1	82	86	−4	1	
3	Amir Levi (ISR)	2	0	2	0	4	−4	49	84	−35	0	

First match(es) will be played: 30 August 2024. Source: COJOP2024
(H) Host

Date	Time	Player 1	Score	Player 2	Set 1	Set 2	Set 3	Report
Aug 30	10:01	Kim Jung-jun (South Korea)	2–1	(France) Thomas Jakobs	22–24	21–8	21–8	Report
Aug 30	21:07	Thomas Jakobs (France)	2–0	(Israel) Amir Levi	21–12	21–10		Report
Aug 31	16:40	Kim Jung-jun (South Korea)	2–0	(Israel) Amir Levi	21–15	21–12		Report

=== Group C ===
Pos	Team	Pld	W	L	GF	GA	GD	PF	PA	PD	Pts	Qualification
1	Yu Soo-young (KOR)	2	2	0	4	1	+3	106	76	+30	2	Semi-finals
2	Mai Jianpeng (CHN)	2	1	1	2	3	−1	82	102	−20	1	
3	Rick Cornell Hellmann (GER)	2	0	2	2	4	−2	102	112	−10	0	

First match(es) will be played: 30 August 2024. Source: COJOP2024

Date	Time	Player 1	Score	Player 2	Set 1	Set 2	Set 3	Report
Aug 30	10:23	Yu Soo-young (South Korea)	2–0	(China) Mai Jianpeng	21–9	24–22		Report
Aug 30	19:45	Mai Jianpeng (China)	2–1	(Germany) Rick Cornell Hellmann	21–19	9–21	21–17	Report
Aug 31	16:05	Yu Soo-young (South Korea)	2–1	(Germany) Rick Cornell Hellmann	19–21	21–17	21–7	Report

=== Group D ===
Pos	Team	Pld	W	L	GF	GA	GD	PF	PA	PD	Pts	Qualification
1	Chan Ho Yuen (HKG)	2	2	0	4	0	+4	84	40	+44	2	Semi-finals
2	Jaime Aránguiz (CHI)	2	1	1	2	2	0	60	70	−10	1	
3	Noor Azwan Noorlan (MAS)	2	0	2	0	4	−4	50	84	−34	0	

First match(es) will be played: 30 August 2024. Source: COJOP2024

Date	Time	Player 1	Score	Player 2	Set 1	Set 2	Set 3	Report
Aug 30	11:12	Chan Ho Yuen (Hong Kong)	2–0	(Chile) Jaime Aránguiz	21–10	21–8		Report
Aug 30	21:03	Jaime Aránguiz (Chile)	2–0	(Malaysia) Noor Azwan Noorlan	21–15	21–13		Report
Aug 31	17:12	Chan Ho Yuen (Hong Kong)	2–0	(Malaysia) Noor Azwan Noorlan	21–11	21–11		Report

== Finals ==
The knockout stage will be played from 1 to 2 September.

Semi-finals
1	Daiki Kajiwara (JPN)	21	21	-
3	Kim Jung-jun (KOR)	17	9	-
4	Yu Soo-young (KOR)	21	10	-
2	Chan Ho Yuen (HKG)	23	21	-

Gold medal match
1	Daiki Kajiwara (JPN) (gold)	21	21	-
2	Chan Ho Yuen (HKG) (silver)	10	10	-
Bronze medal match
3	Kim Jung-jun (KOR) (bronze)	19	21	24
4	Yu Soo-young (KOR)	21	19	22
