= 2026 BWF Para-Badminton World Championships – Men's Singles WH2 =

Men's Singles WH2 at 2026 BWF Para-Badminton World Championships
Tournament details
- Dates: 8–13 February 2026
- Competitors: 30
- Venue: Isa Sports City, Manama

The men's singles WH2 tournament at the 2026 BWF Para-Badminton World Championships took place from 8 to 13 February 2026 at Isa Sports City in Manama. A total of 30 players competed at the tournament.

== Classification ==
- WH2
  Players have impairment in one or both lower limbs and minimal or no impairment of the trunk and also require wheelchair

== Format ==
The 30 players were split into 8 groups of three to four players. They played a round-robin tournament with the top 2 players advancing to the knockout stage. Each match was played in a best-of-3.

== Seeds ==
These were the seeds for this event:

1. (Japan) Daiki Kajiwara (champion)
2. (South Korea) Kim Jung-jun (semi-finals)

== Group stage ==
All times are local (UTC+3).

=== Group A ===
Pos	Team	Pld	W	L	GF	GA	GD	PF	PA	PD	Pts	Qualification
1	Daiki Kajiwara (JPN)	2	2	0	4	0	+4	84	31	+53	2	Knockout stage
2	Mai Jianpeng (CHN)	2	1	1	2	2	0	68	60	+8	1	Knockout stage
3	Marc Elmer (SUI)	2	0	2	0	4	−4	23	84	−61	0	

Source: BWFBadminton.com

Date	Time	Player 1	Score	Player 2	Set 1	Set 2	Set 3
8 February	09:00	Mai Jianpeng (China)	2–0	(Switzerland) Marc Elmer	21–13	21–5	
8 February	14:00	Daiki Kajiwara (Japan)	2–0	(China) Mai Jianpeng	21–16	21–10	
9 February	11:30	Daiki Kajiwara (Japan)	2–0	(Switzerland) Marc Elmer	21–4	21–11	

=== Group B ===
Pos	Team	Pld	W	L	GF	GA	GD	PF	PA	PD	Pts	Qualification
1	Kim Jung-jun (KOR)	2	2	0	4	0	+4	84	24	+60	2	Knockout stage
2	Grant Manzoney (AUS)	2	1	1	2	3	−1	76	82	−6	1	Knockout stage
3	Jan-Gerriet Janssen (DEU)	2	0	2	1	4	−3	48	102	−54	0	

Source: BWFBadminton.com

Date	Time	Player 1	Score	Player 2	Set 1	Set 2	Set 3
8 February	09:00	Grant Manzoney (Australia)	2–1	(Germany) Jan-Gerriet Janssen	21–8	18–21	21–11
8 February	14:00	Kim Jung-jun (South Korea)	2–0	(Australia) Grant Manzoney	21–9	21–7	
9 February	11:30	Kim Jung-jun (South Korea)	2–0	(Germany) Jan-Gerriet Janssen	21–4	21–4	

=== Group C ===
Pos	Team	Pld	W	L	GF	GA	GD	PF	PA	PD	Pts	Qualification
1	Rick Hellmann (DEU)	3	3	0	6	0	+6	126	78	+48	3	Knockout stage
2	Wiwin Andri (INA)	3	2	1	4	4	0	138	141	−3	2	Knockout stage
3	Haris Mythili Srikumar (IND)	3	1	2	3	4	−1	131	131	0	1	
4	Amir Levi (ISR)	3	0	3	1	6	−5	96	141	−45	0	

Source: BWFBadminton.com

Date	Time	Player 1	Score	Player 2	Set 1	Set 2	Set 3
8 February	09:00	Rick Hellmann (Germany)	2–0	(Indonesia) Wiwin Andri	21–11	21–15	
8 February	09:00	Haris Mythili Srikumar (India)	2–0	(Israel) Amir Levi	21–18	21–16	
8 February	14:00	Rick Hellmann (Germany)	2–0	(India) Haris Mythili Srikumar	21–17	21–16	
8 February	14:00	Amir Levi (Israel)	1–2	(Indonesia) Wiwin Andri	21–15	14–21	8–21
9 February	11:30	Rick Hellmann (Germany)	2–0	(Israel) Amir Levi	21–10	21–9	
9 February	12:00	Haris Mythili Srikumar (India)	1–2	(Indonesia) Wiwin Andri	17–21	21–13	18–21

=== Group D ===
Pos	Team	Pld	W	L	GF	GA	GD	PF	PA	PD	Pts	Qualification
1	Yu Soo-young (KOR)	3	3	0	6	0	+6	126	27	+99	3	Knockout stage
2	Kittichai Rakjaingam (THA)	3	2	1	4	2	+2	95	83	+12	2	Knockout stage
3	Qambar Ali Akhteyari (AUS)	3	1	2	2	5	−3	85	128	−43	1	
4	Ashley Irenaeus Jeck (MAS)	3	0	3	1	6	−5	73	141	−68	0	

Source: BWFBadminton.com

Date	Time	Player 1	Score	Player 2	Set 1	Set 2	Set 3
8 February	09:00	Kittichai Rakjaingam (Thailand)	2–0	(Australia) Qambar Ali Akhteyari	21–8	21–15	
8 February	09:30	Yu Soo-young (South Korea)	2–0	(Malaysia) Ashley Irenaeus Jeck	21–6	21–5	
8 February	14:30	Yu Soo-young (South Korea)	2–0	(Thailand) Kittichai Rakjaingam	21–8	21–3	
8 February	14:30	Qambar Ali Akhteyari (Australia)	2–1	(Malaysia) Ashley Irenaeus Jeck	15–21	21–9	21–14
9 February	12:00	Yu Soo-young (South Korea)	2–0	(Australia) Qambar Ali Akhteyari	21–4	21–1	
9 February	12:00	Kittichai Rakjaingam (Thailand)	2–0	(Malaysia) Ashley Irenaeus Jeck	21–7	21–11	

=== Group E ===
Pos	Team	Pld	W	L	GF	GA	GD	PF	PA	PD	Pts	Qualification
1	Jaime Aránguiz (CHL)	3	3	0	6	0	+6	130	61	+69	3	Knockout stage
2	Julio Cesar Godoy (BRA)	3	2	1	4	2	+2	118	87	+31	2	Knockout stage
3	Manjunatha Chikaiah (IND)	3	1	2	2	4	−2	82	107	−25	1	
4	Mahdi Al-Makinah (KSA)	3	0	3	0	6	−6	51	126	−75	0	

Source: BWFBadminton.com

Date	Time	Player 1	Score	Player 2	Set 1	Set 2	Set 3
8 February	09:30	Jaime Aránguiz (Chile)	2–0	(Brazil) Julio Cesar Godoy	21–11	25–23	
8 February	09:30	Manjunatha Chikaiah (India)	2–0	(Saudi Arabia) Mahdi Al-Makinah	21–12	21–11	
8 February	14:30	Jaime Aránguiz (Chile)	2–0	(India) Manjunatha Chikaiah	21–6	21–9	
8 February	14:30	Mahdi Al-Makinah (Saudi Arabia)	0–2	(Brazil) Julio Cesar Godoy	7–21	9–21	
9 February	12:00	Jaime Aránguiz (Chile)	2–0	(Saudi Arabia) Mahdi Al-Makinah	21–6	21–6	
9 February	12:00	Manjunatha Chikaiah (India)	0–2	(Brazil) Julio Cesar Godoy	14–21	11–21	

=== Group F ===
Pos	Team	Pld	W	L	GF	GA	GD	PF	PA	PD	Pts	Qualification
1	Reo Oyama (JPN)	3	3	0	6	0	+6	128	75	+53	3	Knockout stage
2	Noor Azwan Noorlan (MAS)	3	2	1	4	3	+1	140	98	+42	2	Knockout stage
3	Abu Hubaida (IND)	3	1	2	3	4	−1	112	112	0	1	
4	Mohamed Hassan Farrag (EGY)	3	0	3	0	6	−6	31	126	−95	0	

Source: BWFBadminton.com

Date	Time	Player 1	Score	Player 2	Set 1	Set 2	Set 3
8 February	09:30	Mohamed Hassan Farrag (Egypt)	0–2	(India) Abu Hubaida	6–21	5–21	
8 February	10:00	Noor Azwan Noorlan (Malaysia)	0–2	(Japan) Reo Oyama	21–23	18–21	
8 February	15:00	Noor Azwan Noorlan (Malaysia)	2–0	(Egypt) Mohamed Hassan Farrag	21–6	21–5	
8 February	15:00	Abu Hubaida (India)	0–2	(Japan) Reo Oyama	11–21	16–21	
9 February	12:30	Noor Azwan Noorlan (Malaysia)	2–1	(India) Abu Hubaida	17–21	21–14	21–8
9 February	12:30	Mohamed Hassan Farrag (Egypt)	0–2	(Japan) Reo Oyama	2–21	7–21	

=== Group G ===
Pos	Team	Pld	W	L	GF	GA	GD	PF	PA	PD	Pts	Qualification
1	Luca Olgiati (SUI)	3	3	0	6	0	+6	126	44	+82	3	Knockout stage
2	Supriadi (INA)	3	2	1	4	2	+2	108	62	+46	2	Knockout stage
3	Nurul Hossain Khan (IND)	3	1	2	2	4	−2	63	113	−50	1	
4	Daniel Kontsch (AUT)	3	0	3	0	6	−6	48	126	−78	0	

Source: BWFBadminton.com

Date	Time	Player 1	Score	Player 2	Set 1	Set 2	Set 3
8 February	10:00	Luca Olgiati (Switzerland)	2–0	(Austria) Daniel Kontsch	21–5	21–6	
8 February	10:00	Nurul Hossain Khan (India)	0–2	(Indonesia) Supriadi	4–21	8–21	
8 February	15:00	Luca Olgiati (Switzerland)	2–0	(India) Nurul Hossain Khan	21–5	21–4	
8 February	15:00	Supriadi (Indonesia)	2–0	(Austria) Daniel Kontsch	21–3	21–5	
9 February	12:30	Luca Olgiati (Switzerland)	2–0	(Indonesia) Supriadi	21–16	21–8	
9 February	12:30	Nurul Hossain Khan (India)	2–0	(Austria) Daniel Kontsch	21–15	21–4	

=== Group H ===
Pos	Team	Pld	W	L	GF	GA	GD	PF	PA	PD	Pts	Qualification
1	Zhao Xin (CHN)	3	3	0	6	1	+5	139	68	+71	3	Knockout stage
2	Thomas Jakobs (FRA)	3	2	1	5	2	+3	133	63	+70	2	Knockout stage
3	Arturo Zambrano Alejo (MEX)	3	1	2	2	4	−2	59	105	−46	1	
4	Hayden Braun (AUS)	3	0	3	0	6	−6	31	126	−95	0	

Source: BWFBadminton.com

Date	Time	Player 1	Score	Player 2	Set 1	Set 2	Set 3
8 February	10:00	Thomas Jakobs (France)	1–2	(China) Zhao Xin	21–13	15–21	13–21
8 February	10:00	Arturo Zambrano Alejo (Mexico)	2–0	(Australia) Hayden Braun	21–12	21–9	
8 February	15:00	Thomas Jakobs (France)	2–0	(Mexico) Arturo Zambrano Alejo	21–3	21–3	
8 February	15:30	Hayden Braun (Australia)	0–2	(China) Zhao Xin	4–21	4–21	
9 February	13:00	Thomas Jakobs (France)	2–0	(Australia) Hayden Braun	21–2	21–0	
9 February	13:00	Arturo Zambrano Alejo (Mexico)	0–2	(China) Zhao Xin	2–21	9–21	

== Knockout stage ==
Round of 16
A1	(Japan) Daiki Kajiwara	21	21
G2	(Indonesia) Supriadi	3	9
G1	(Switzerland) Luca Olgiati	16	16
C2	(Indonesia) Wiwin Andri	21	21
C1	(Germany) Rick Hellmann	21	21
H2	(France) Thomas Jakobs	8	9
H1	(China) Zhao Xin	21	21
E2	(Brazil) Julio Cesar Godoy	8	10
B2	(Australia) Grant Manzoney	7	5
E1	(Chile) Jaime Aránguiz	21	21
A2	(China) Mai Jianpeng	21	14
D1	(South Korea) Yu Soo-young	23	21
D2	(Thailand) Kittichai Rakjaingam	8	8
F1	(Japan) Reo Oyama	21	21
F2	(Malaysia) Noor Azwan Noorlan	15	9
B1	(South Korea) Kim Jung-jun	21	21

Quarter-finals
A1	(Japan) Daiki Kajiwara	21	21
C2	(Indonesia) Wiwin Andri	4	8
C1	(Germany) Rick Hellmann	17	18
H1	(China) Zhao Xin	21	21
E1	(Chile) Jaime Aránguiz	9	14
D1	(South Korea) Yu Soo-young	21	21
F1	(Japan) Reo Oyama	10	15
B1	(South Korea) Kim Jung-jun	21	21

Semi-finals
A1	(Japan) Daiki Kajiwara	21	21
H1	(China) Zhao Xin	5	5
D1	(South Korea) Yu Soo-young	21	21
B1	(South Korea) Kim Jung-jun	10	15

Final
A1	(Japan) Daiki Kajiwara	23	21
D1	(South Korea) Yu Soo-young	21	13
