= Badminton at the 2020 Summer Paralympics – Men's singles WH2 =

Men's singles WH2 at the XVI Paralympic Games
- Venue: Yoyogi National Gymnasium
- Dates: 2–4 September 2021
- Competitors: 9 from 8 nations

Medalists
1st place, gold medalist(s)		Daiki Kajiwara	Japan
2nd place, silver medalist(s)		Kim Jung-jun	South Korea
3rd place, bronze medalist(s)		Chan Ho Yuen	Hong Kong

The men's singles WH2 tournament at the 2020 Summer Paralympics in Tokyo took place between 2 and 4 September 2021 at Yoyogi National Gymnasium.

== Seeds ==
These were the seeds for this event:

1. Kim Jung-jun (KOR) (silver medalist)
2. Chan Ho Yuen (HKG) (bronze medalist)
3. Martin Rooke (GBR) (quarter-finals)

== Group stage ==
The draw of the group stage revealed on 26 August 2021. The group stage was played from 2 to 3 September. The top two winners of each group advanced to the knockout rounds.

=== Group A ===
Pos	Team	Pld	W	L	GF	GA	GD	PF	PA	PD	Pts	Qualification
1	Kim Jung-jun (KOR)	2	2	0	4	0	+4	84	51	+33	2	Advance to semi-finals
2	Kim Kyung-hoon (KOR)	2	1	1	2	2	0	76	55	+21	1	Advance to quarter-finals
3	Grant Manzoney (AUS)	2	0	2	0	4	−4	30	84	−54	0	

Source: TOCOG

Date	Time	Player 1	Score	Player 2	Set 1	Set 2	Set 3
2 Sep	09:40	Kim Jung-jun (South Korea)	2–0	(South Korea) Kim Kyung-hoon	21–19	21–15	
2 Sep	17:20	Kim Kyung-hoon (South Korea)	2–0	(Australia) Grant Manzoney	21–8	21–5	
3 Sep	12:20	Kim Jung-jun (South Korea)	2–0	(Australia) Grant Manzoney	21–8	21–9	

=== Group B ===
Pos	Team	Pld	W	L	GF	GA	GD	PF	PA	PD	Pts	Qualification
1	Mai Jianpeng (CHN)	2	2	0	4	0	+4	84	51	+33	2	Advance to quarter-finals
2	Martin Rooke (GBR)	2	1	1	2	3	−1	93	90	+3	1	Advance to quarter-finals
3	Dumnern Junthong (THA)	2	0	2	1	4	−3	66	102	−36	0	

Source: TOCOG

Date	Time	Player 1	Score	Player 2	Set 1	Set 2	Set 3
2 Sep	09:40	Martin Rooke (United Kingdom)	2–1	(Thailand) Dumnern Junthong	18–21	21–15	21–12
2 Sep	17:20	Mai Jianpeng (China)	2–0	(Thailand) Dumnern Junthong	21–12	21–6	
3 Sep	12:20	Martin Rooke (United Kingdom)	0–2	(China) Mai Jianpeng	17–21	16–21	

=== Group C ===
Pos	Team	Pld	W	L	GF	GA	GD	PF	PA	PD	Pts	Qualification
1	Daiki Kajiwara (JPN)	2	2	0	4	1	+3	97	60	+37	2	Advance to semi-finals
2	Chan Ho Yuen (HKG)	2	1	1	3	2	+1	88	73	+15	1	Advance to quarter-finals
3	Thomas Jakobs (FRA)	2	0	2	0	4	−4	32	84	−52	0	

Source: TOCOG

Date	Time	Player 1	Score	Player 2	Set 1	Set 2	Set 3
2 Sep	10:20	Chan Ho Yuen (Hong Kong)	2–0	(France) Thomas Jakobs	21–10	21–8	
2 Sep	18:00	Daiki Kajiwara (Japan)	2–0	(France) Thomas Jakobs	21–9	21–5	
3 Sep	13:00	Chan Ho Yuen (Hong Kong)	1–2	(Japan) Daiki Kajiwara	21–13	12–21	13–21

== Finals ==
The knockout stage was played from 3 to 5 September.

Quarter-finals
C2	Chan Ho Yuen (HKG)	21	21
B2	Martin Rooke (GBR)	9	11
A2	Kim Kyung-hoon (KOR)	21	21
B1	Mai Jianpeng (CHN)	13	12

Semi-finals
A1	Kim Jung-jun (KOR)	15	21	21
C2	Chan Ho Yuen (HKG)	21	15	15
A2	Kim Kyung-hoon (KOR)	14	15
C1	Daiki Kajiwara (JPN)	21	21

Gold medal match
A1	Kim Jung-jun (KOR) (silver)	18	19
C1	Daiki Kajiwara (JPN) (gold)	21	21
Bronze medal match
C2	Chan Ho Yuen (HKG) (bronze)	24	21
A2	Kim Kyung-hoon (KOR)	22	10
