= Badminton at the 2022 Asian Para Games – Men's doubles WH1–WH2 =

Badminton's men's doubles WH1–WH2 at the 2022 Asian Para Games
- Venue: Binjiang Gymnasium, Hangzhou
- Dates: 21 – 27 August 2023
- Competitors: 28 from 11 nations

Medalists
gold medal	Mai Jianpeng; Qu Zimo	China
silver medal	Choi Jung-man; Kim Jung-jun	South Korea
bronze medal	Yang Tong; Zhou Xin	China
bronze medal	Lee Sam-seop; Yu Soo-young	South Korea

The men's doubles WH1–WH2 badminton tournament at the 2022 Asian Para Games is playing from 21 to 27 October 2023 in Binjiang Gymnasium, Hangzhou. A total of 14 pairs competed at the tournament, four of whom was seeded.

== Competition schedule ==
Plays are taking place between 21 and 27 October 2023.

GS	Group stage	¼	Quarterfinals	½	Semifinals	F	Final

Events	Fri 20	Sat 21	Sun 22	Mon 23	Tue 24	Wed 25	Thu 26	Fri 27
Men's doubles WH1–WH2		GS		GS	GS	¼	½	F

== Seeds ==
The following players were seeded:

1. Choi Jung-man / Kim Jung-jun (KOR) (final; silver medalists)
2. Noor Azwan Noorlan / Muhammad Ikhwan Ramli (MAS) (quarter-finals)
3. Matsumoto Takumi / Keita Nishimura (JPN) (group stage)
4. Prem Kumar Ale / Abu Hubaida (IND) (quarter-finals)

== Group stage ==
=== Group A ===
Pos	Team	Pld	W	L	GF	GA	GD	PF	PA	PD	Qualification
1	Choi Jung-man (KOR) Kim Jung-jun (KOR) [1]	2	2	0	4	0	+4	84	33	+51	Qualification to elimination stage
2	Yang Tong (CHN) Zhou Xin (CHN) (H)	2	1	1	2	2	0	67	51	+16	Qualification to elimination stage
3	Isaa Hasan (SYR) Amer Sammour (SYR)	2	0	2	0	4	−4	17	84	−67	

Source: Group A – standings
(H) Host

Date		Score		Game 1	Game 2	Game 3
21 Oct	Isaa Hasan (Syria); Amer Sammour (Syria)	0–2	(China) Yang Tong (China) Zhou Xin	6–21	3–21	
23 Oct	Choi Jung-man (South Korea); Kim Jung-jun (South Korea)	2–0	(Syria) Isaa Hasan (Syria) Amer Sammour	21–4	21–4	
24 Oct	Choi Jung-man (South Korea); Kim Jung-jun (South Korea)	2–0	(China) Yang Tong (China) Zhou Xin	21–13	21–12	

=== Group B ===
Pos	Team	Pld	W	L	GF	GA	GD	PF	PA	PD	Qualification
1	Lee Sam-seop (KOR) Yu Yoo-young (KOR)	2	2	0	4	1	+3	104	59	+45	Qualification to elimination stage
2	Noor Azwan Noorlan (MAS) Muhammad Ikhwan Ramli (MAS) [2]	2	1	1	3	2	+1	79	90	−11	Qualification to elimination stage
3	Supriadi (INA) Agung Widodo (INA)	2	0	2	0	4	−4	50	84	−34	

Source: Group B – standings

Date		Score		Game 1	Game 2	Game 3
21 Oct	Supriadi (Indonesia); Agung Widodo (Indonesia)	0–2	(South Korea) Lee Sam-seop (South Korea) Yu Yoo-young	8–21	14–21	
23 Oct	Noor Azwan Noorlan (Malaysia); Muhammad Ikhwan Ramli (Malaysia)	2–0	(Indonesia) Supriadi (Indonesia) Agung Widodo	21–17	21–11	
24 Oct	Noor Azwan Noorlan (Malaysia); Muhammad Ikhwan Ramli (Malaysia)	1–2	(South Korea) Lee Sam-seop (South Korea) Yu Yoo-young	22–20	9–21	6–21

=== Group C ===
Pos	Team	Pld	W	L	GF	GA	GD	PF	PA	PD	Qualification
1	Mai Jianpeng (CHN) Qu Zimo (CHN) (H)	3	3	0	6	0	+6	126	49	+77	Qualification to elimination stage
2	Jakarin Homhual (THA) Dumnern Junthong (THA)	3	2	1	4	2	+2	99	76	+23	Qualification to elimination stage
3	Matsimoto Takumi (JPN) Keita Nishimura (JPN) [3/4]	3	1	2	2	4	−2	99	88	+11	
4	Jamal Khalifa Al-Bedwawi (UAE) Mohamed Ahmed Alzarooni (UAE)	3	0	3	0	6	−6	15	126	−111	

Source: Group C – standings
(H) Host

Date		Score		Game 1	Game 2	Game 3
21 Oct	Matsimoto Takumi (Japan); Keita Nishimura (Japan)	0–2	(Thailand) Jakarin Homhual (Thailand) Dumnern Junthong	18–21	12–21	
21 Oct	Jamal Khalifa Al-Bedwawi (United Arab Emirates); Mohamed Ahmed Alzarooni (United Arab Emirates)	0–2	(China) Mai Jianpeng (China) Qu Zimo	4–21	3–21	
23 Oct	Matsimoto Takumi (Japan); Keita Nishimura (Japan)	2–0	(United Arab Emirates) Jamal Khalifa Al-Bedwawi (United Arab Emirates) Mohamed Ahmed Alzarooni	21–3	21–1	
23 Oct	Mai Jianpeng (China); Qu Zimo (China)	2–0	(Thailand) Jakarin Homhual (Thailand) Dumnern Junthong	21–8	21–7	
24 Oct	Matsimoto Takumi (Japan); Keita Nishimura (Japan)	0–2	(China) Mai Jianpeng (China) Qu Zimo	13–21	14–21	
24 Oct	Jamal Khalifa Al-Bedwawi (United Arab Emirates); Mohamed Ahmed Alzarooni (United Arab Emirates)	0–2	(Thailand) Jakarin Homhual (Thailand) Dumnern Junthong	1–21	3–21	

=== Group D ===
Pos	Team	Pld	W	L	GF	GA	GD	PF	PA	PD	Qualification
1	Prem Kumar Ale (IND) Abu Hubaida (IND) [3/4]	3	3	0	6	0	+6	126	70	+56	Qualification to elimination stage
2	Hoàng Mạnh Giang (VIE) Trương Ngọc Bình (VIE)	3	2	1	4	2	+2	110	95	+15	Qualification to elimination stage
3	Chatchai Kornpeekanok (THA) Aphichat Sumpradit (THA)	3	1	2	2	4	−2	100	96	+4	
4	Dung Shiau-wei (TPE) Fang Chih-tsung (TPE)	3	0	3	0	6	−6	51	126	−75	

Source: Group D – standings

Date		Score		Game 1	Game 2	Game 3
21 Oct	Prem Kumar Ale (India); Abu Hubaida (India)	2–0	(Thailand) Chatchai Kornpeekanok (Thailand) Aphichat Sumpradit	21–16	21–7	
21 Oct	Hoàng Mạnh Giang (Vietnam); Trương Ngọc Bình (Vietnam)	2–0	(Chinese Taipei) Dung Shiau-wei (Chinese Taipei) Fang Chih-tsung	21–3	21–15	
23 Oct	Prem Kumar Ale (India); Abu Hubaida (India)	2–0	(Vietnam) Hoàng Mạnh Giang (Vietnam) Trương Ngọc Bình	21–11	21–15	
23 Oct	Dung Shiau-wei (Chinese Taipei); Fang Chih-tsung (Chinese Taipei)	0–2	(Thailand) Chatchai Kornpeekanok (Thailand) Aphichat Sumpradit	4–21	8–21	
24 Oct	Prem Kumar Ale (India); Abu Hubaida (India)	2–0	(Chinese Taipei) Dung Shiau-wei (Chinese Taipei) Fang Chih-tsung	21–8	21–13	
24 Oct	Hoàng Mạnh Giang (Vietnam); Trương Ngọc Bình (Vietnam)	2–0	(Thailand) Chatchai Kornpeekanok (Thailand) Aphichat Sumpradit	21–18	21–17	

== Elimination round ==
Top two ranked in each group qualified to the elimination round, the draw was decided after the previous round finished.

Quarter-finals
1	Choi Jung-man (KOR); Kim Jung-jun (KOR)	21	21
Hoàng Mạnh Giang (VIE); Trương Ngọc Bình (VIE)	9	14
3/4	Prem Kumar Ale (IND); Abu Hubaida (IND)	19	10
Yang Tong (CHN); Zhou Xin (CHN)	21	21
2	Noor Azwan Noorlan (MAS); Muhammad Ikhwan Ramli (MAS)	7	17
Mai Jianpeng (CHN); Qu Zimo (CHN)	21	21
Jakarin Homhual (THA); Dumnern Junthong (THA)	17	13
Lee Sam-seop (KOR); Yu Yoo-young (KOR)	21	21

Semi-finals
1	Choi Jung-man (KOR); Kim Jung-jun (KOR)	21	21
Yang Tong (CHN); Zhou Xin (CHN)	13	10
Mai Jianpeng (CHN); Qu Zimo (CHN)	21	21
Lee Sam-seop (KOR); Yu Yoo-young (KOR)	9	12

Final
1	Choi Jung-man (KOR); Kim Jung-jun (KOR)	15	16
Mai Jianpeng (CHN); Qu Zimo (CHN)	21	21
