= Kim Jung-jun =

South Korean para badminton player

Personal information
- Born: 26 August 1978 (age 48) Goryeong County, North Gyeongsang Province, South Korea

Sport
- Country: South Korea
- Sport: Badminton

Men's singles WH2 Men's doubles WH1–WH2
- Highest ranking: 1 (MS 1 January 2019); 1 (MD with Lee Sam-seop 25 June 2019)
- Current ranking: 3 (MS); 2 (MD with Choi Jung-man) (3 September 2024)
- BWF profile
Medal record
Men's para badminton
Representing South Korea
Paralympic Games
Silver medal – second place	2020 Tokyo	Men's singles
Silver medal – second place	2020 Tokyo	Men's doubles
Bronze medal – third place	2024 Paris	Men's singles
World Championships
Gold medal – first place	2013 Dortmund	Men's singles
Gold medal – first place	2013 Dortmund	Men's doubles
Gold medal – first place	2015 Stoke Mandeville	Men's singles
Gold medal – first place	2017 Ulsan	Men's singles
Gold medal – first place	2017 Ulsan	Men's doubles
Gold medal – first place	2019 Basel	Men's singles
Silver medal – second place	2015 Stoke Mandeville	Men's doubles
Silver medal – second place	2019 Basel	Men's doubles
Silver medal – second place	2022 Tokyo	Men's singles
Bronze medal – third place	2017 Ulsan	Mixed doubles
Bronze medal – third place	2024 Pattaya	Men's singles
Bronze medal – third place	2024 Pattaya	Men's doubles
Bronze medal – third place	2026 Manama	Men's singles
Asian Para Games
Gold medal – first place	2014 Incheon	Men's singles
Gold medal – first place	2018 Jakarta	Men's singles
Silver medal – second place	2018 Jakarta	Men's doubles
Silver medal – second place	2022 Hangzhou	Men's doubles
Bronze medal – third place	2014 Incheon	Mixed doubles
Bronze medal – third place	2022 Hangzhou	Men's singles
Asian Championships
Gold medal – first place	2012 Yeoju	Men's singles
Gold medal – first place	2012 Yeoju	Men's doubles
Gold medal – first place	2012 Yeoju	Mixed doubles
Gold medal – first place	2016 Beijing	Men's singles
Silver medal – second place	2016 Beijing	Men's doubles

Kim Jung-jun (Korean: 김정준; Hanja: 金正俊; born 26 August 1978) is a South Korean para badminton player. He participated at the 2020 Summer Paralympics in the badminton competition, and won silver medals in the men's singles WH2 event, and the men's doubles WH1–WH2 event, with his teammate, Lee Dong-seop.

== Achievements ==
=== Paralympic Games ===
Men's singles WH2

Year	Venue	Opponent	Score	Result
2020	Yoyogi National Gymnasium, Tokyo, Japan	(Japan) Daiki Kajiwara	18–21, 19–21	Silver
2024	Porte de La Chapelle Arena, Paris, France	(South Korea) Yu Soo-young	19–21, 21–19, 24–22	Bronze

Men's doubles WH1–WH2

Year	Venue	Partner	Opponent	Score	Result
2020	Yoyogi National Gymnasium, Tokyo, Japan	(South Korea) Lee Dong-seop	(China) Mai Jianpeng (China) Qu Zimo	10–21, 14–21	Silver

=== World Championships ===
Men's singles WH2
Year	Venue	Opponent	Score	Result
2013	Helmut-Körnig-Halle, Dortmund, Germany	(South Korea) Kim Kyung-hoon	21–15, 21–17	Gold
2015	Stoke Mandeville Stadium, Stoke Mandeville, England	(South Korea) Kim Kyung-hoon	21–19, 21–16	Gold
2017	Dongchun Gymnasium, Ulsan, South Korea	(South Korea) Kim Kyung-hoon	21–16, 21–19	Gold
2019	St. Jakobshalle; Basel, Switzerland	(Hong Kong) Chan Ho Yuen	21–18, 13–21, 21–18	Gold
2022	Yoyogi National Gymnasium; Tokyo, Japan	(Japan) Daiki Kajiwara	12–21, 11–21	Silver
2024	Pattaya Exhibition and Convention Hall; Pattaya, Thailand	(South Korea) Yu Soo-young	10–21, 21–19, 13–21	Bronze
2026	Isa Sports City, Manama, Bahrain	(South Korea) Yu Soo-young	10–21, 15–21	Bronze

Men's doubles WH1–WH2
Year	Venue	Partner	Opponent	Score	Result
2013	Helmut-Körnig-Halle, Dortmund, Germany	(South Korea) Kim Kyung-hoon	(England) Gobi Ranganathan (England) Martin Rooke	21–14, 21–19	Gold
2015	Stoke Mandeville Stadium, Stoke Mandeville, England	(South Korea) Lee Dong-seop	(South Korea) Kim Kyung-hoon (South Korea) Lee Sam-seop	17–21, 21–19, 24–26	Silver
2017	Dongchun Gymnasium, Ulsan, South Korea	(South Korea) Lee Sam-seop	(South Korea) Choi Jung-man (South Korea) Kim Sung-hun	16–21, 21–10, 21–8	Gold
2019	St. Jakobshalle, Basel, Switzerland	(South Korea) Lee Dong-seop	(China) Mai Jianpeng (China) Qu Zimo	21–18, 18–21, 15–21	Silver
2024	Pattaya Exhibition and Convention Hall, Pattaya, Thailand	(South Korea) Choi Jung-man	(China) Mai Jianpeng (China) Qu Zimo	10–21, 17–21	Bronze

Mixed doubles WH1–WH2
Year	Venue	Partner	Opponent	Score	Result
2017	Dongchun Gymnasium, Ulsan, South Korea	(South Korea) Kang Jung-kum	(South Korea) Lee Sam-seop (South Korea) Lee Sun-ae	21–23, 21–17, 17–21	Bronze

=== Asian Para Games ===
Men's singles WH2
Year	Venue	Opponent	Score	Result
2014	Gyeyang Gymnasium; Incheon, South Korea	(South Korea) Kim Kyung-hoon	21–12, 14–21, 21–13	Gold
2018	Istora Gelora Bung Karno; Jakarta, Indonesia	(Hong Kong) Chan Ho Yuen	15–21, 21–6, 21–17	Gold
2022	Binjiang Gymnasium; Hangzhou, China	(South Korea) Yu Soo-young	17–21, 18–21	Bronze

Men's doubles WH1–WH2
Year	Venue	Partner	Opponent	Score	Result
2018	Istora Gelora Bung Karno, Jakarta, Indonesia	(South Korea) Lee Dong-seop	(China) Mai Jianpeng (China) Qu Zimo	15–21, 21–13, 17–21	Silver
2022	Binjiang Gymnasium, Hangzhou, China	(South Korea) Choi Jung-man	(China) Mai Jianpeng (China) Qu Zimo	15–21, 16–21	Silver

Mixed doubles WH1–WH2
Year	Venue	Partner	Opponent	Score	Result
2014	Gyeyang Gymnasium, Incheon, South Korea	(South Korea) Son Ok-cha	(Thailand) Jakarin Homhual (Thailand) Amnouy Wetwithan	21–16, 18–21, 15–21	Bronze

=== Asian Championships ===
Men's singles WH2
Year	Venue	Opponent	Score	Result
2012	Yeo-ju Sports Center, Yeoju, South Korea	(South Korea) Lee Sam-seop	10–21, 21–15, 21–11	Gold
2016	China Administration of Sport for Persons with Disabilities; Beijing, China	(China) Mai Jianpeng	21–5, 21–12	Gold

Men's doubles WH1–WH2

Year	Venue	Partner	Opponent	Score	Result
2012 (Note: This tournament uses a round robin system.)	Yeo-ju Sports Center, Yeoju, South Korea	(South Korea) Lee Sam-seop	(Chinese Taipei) Fang Chih-tsung (Chinese Taipei) Ong Yu-yu	21–6, 21–1	Gold
2012	Yeo-ju Sports Center, Yeoju, South Korea	(South Korea) Lee Sam-seop	(Japan) Osamu Nagashima (Japan) Tsutomu Shimada	21–9, 21–12	Gold
2012	Yeo-ju Sports Center, Yeoju, South Korea	(South Korea) Lee Sam-seop	(Thailand) Jakarin Homhual (Thailand) Chatchai Kornpeekanok	21–8, 21–12	Gold
2016	China Administration of Sport for Persons with Disabilities, Beijing, China	(South Korea) Lee Sam-seop	(South Korea) Kim Kyung-hoon (South Korea) Lee Dong-seop	17–21, 16–21	Silver

Mixed doubles WH1–WH2

Year	Venue	Partner	Opponent	Score	Result
2012	Yeo-ju Sports Center, Yeoju, South Korea	(South Korea) Son Ok-cha	(South Korea) Lee Sam-seop (South Korea) Lee Mi-ok	21–15, 21–17	Gold
2012	Yeo-ju Sports Center, Yeoju, South Korea	(South Korea) Son Ok-cha	(Thailand) Jakarin Homhual (Thailand) Amnouy Wetwithan	18–21, 21–9, 21–17	Gold
2012	Yeo-ju Sports Center, Yeoju, South Korea	(South Korea) Son Ok-cha	(Japan) Hiroki Fujino (Japan) Midori Shimada	21–9, 21–7	Gold
2012	Yeo-ju Sports Center, Yeoju, South Korea	(South Korea) Son Ok-cha	(Thailand) Chatchai Kornpeekanok (Thailand) Piyawan Thinjun	21–6, 21–11	Gold

=== BWF Para Badminton World Circuit (11 titles, 8 runners-up) ===
The BWF Para Badminton World Circuit – Grade 2, Level 1, 2 and 3 tournaments has been sanctioned by the Badminton World Federation from 2022.

Men's singles WH2
Year	Tournament	Level	Opponent	Score	Result
2022	Canada Para-Badminton International	Level 1	(Japan) Daiki Kajiwara	12–21, 16–21	(silver) Runner-up
2023	Spanish Para-Badminton International II	Level 2	(Japan) Daiki Kajiwara	14–21, 11–21	(silver) Runner-up
2023	Spanish Para-Badminton International I	Level 1	(Japan) Daiki Kajiwara	13–21, 7–21	(silver) Runner-up
2023	Uganda Para-Badminton International	Level 3	(India) Sanjeev Kumar	21–15, 21–13	(gold) Winner
2023	4 Nations Para-Badminton International	Level 1	(Japan) Daiki Kajiwara	17–21, 21–19, 9–21	(silver) Runner-up
2023	Western Australia Para-Badminton International	Level 2	(South Korea) Kim Kyung-hoon	21–12, 21–17	(gold) Winner
2024	Spanish Para-Badminton International I	Level 1	(Japan) Daiki Kajiwara	2–21, 9–21	(silver) Runner-up
2024	Indonesia Para-Badminton International	Level 2	(Indonesia) Wiwin Andri	21–10, 21–11	(gold) Winner

Men's doubles WH1–WH2
Year	Tournament	Level	Partner	Opponent	Score	Result
2022	Bahrain Para-Badminton International	Level 2	(South Korea) Choi Jung-man	(Germany) Rick Hellmann (Germany) Thomas Wandschneider	12–21, 21–10, 21–11	(gold) Winner
2022	Dubai Para-Badminton International	Level 2	(South Korea) Choi Jung-man	(Malaysia) Muhammad Ikhwan Ramli (Malaysia) Noor Azwan Noorlan	21–13, 21–12	(gold) Winner
2022	Canada Para-Badminton International	Level 1	(South Korea) Jeong Jae-gun	(South Korea) Kim Kyung-hoon (South Korea) Lee Sam-seop	20–22, 21–11, 18–21	(silver) Runner-up
2022	Thailand Para-Badminton International	Level 1	(South Korea) Choi Jung-man	(South Korea) Jeong Jae-gun (South Korea) Yu Soo-young	21–13, 21–12	(gold) Winner
2023	Spanish Para-Badminton International I	Level 1	(South Korea) Choi Jung-man	(Japan) Daiki Kajiwara (Japan) Hiroshi Murayama	21–18, 21–19	(gold) Winner
2023	Thailand Para-Badminton International	Level 2	(South Korea) Choi Jung-man	(China) Mai Jianpeng (China) Qu Zimo	21–17, 14–21, 21–17	(gold) Winner
2023	Canada Para-Badminton International	Level 1	(South Korea) Choi Jung-man	(Japan) Daiki Kajiwara (Japan) Hiroshi Murayama	11–21, 21–17, 16–21	(silver) Runner-up
2023	Uganda Para-Badminton International	Level 3	(South Korea) Ryu Dong-hyun	(India) Sanjeev Kumar (Spain) Francisco Motero	21–7, 21–16	(gold) Winner
2023	4 Nations Para-Badminton International	Level 1	(South Korea) Choi Jung-man	(Japan) Daiki Kajiwara (Japan) Hiroshi Murayama	21–18, 19–21, 21–16	(gold) Winner
2023	Western Australia Para-Badminton International	Level 2	(South Korea) Ryu Dong-hyun	(India) Prem Kumar Ale (India) Abu Hubaida	21–6, 21–14	(gold) Winner
2023	Dubai Para-Badminton International	Level 1	(South Korea) Choi Jung-man	(China) Mai Jianpeng (China) Qu Zimo	13–21, 17–21	(silver) Runner-up
2024	Spanish Para-Badminton International II	Level 2	(South Korea) Choi Jung-man	(Japan) Takumi Matsumoto (Japan) Keita Nishimura	22–20, 21–19	(gold) Winner
2024	Indonesia Para-Badminton International	Level 2	(South Korea) Ryu Dong-hyun	(South Korea) Kim Kyung-hoon (South Korea) Lee Sam-seop	22–20, 17–21, 22–20	(gold) Winner

=== International tournaments (2011–2021) (35 titles, 9 runners-up) ===
Men's singles WH2
Year	Tournament	Opponent	Score	Result
2013	Spanish Para-Badminton International	(South Korea) Lee Sam-seop	21–19, 18–21, 21–16	(gold) Winner
2014	England-Para Badminton Championships	(South Korea) Kim Kyung-hoon	21–17, 14–21, 21–19	(gold) Winner
2015	China Para-Badminton International	(South Korea) Kim Kyung-hoon	21–19, 21–14	(gold) Winner
2016	Irish Para-Badminton International	(South Korea) Kim Kyung-hoon	22–20, 21–19	(gold) Winner
2017	Spanish Para-Badminton International	(South Korea) Kim Kyung-hoon	21–12, 23–21	(gold) Winner
2017	Thailand Para-Badminton International	(Hong Kong) Chan Ho Yuen	21–18, 21–12	(gold) Winner
2017	Japan Para-Badminton International	(Hong Kong) Chan Ho Yuen	22–20, 21–13	(gold) Winner
2017	USA Para-Badminton International	(Malaysia) Madzlan Saibon	21–16, 19–21, 22–20	(gold) Winner
2018	Spanish Para-Badminton International	(Hong Kong) Chan Ho Yuen	21–7, 21–13	(gold) Winner
2018	Thailand Para-Badminton International	(Hong Kong) Chan Ho Yuen	27–25, 18–21, 21–16	(gold) Winner
2018	Australia Para-Badminton International	(Hong Kong) Chan Ho Yuen	14–21, 21–18, 13–21	(silver) Runner-up
2019	Turkish Para-Badminton International	(Hong Kong) Chan Ho Yuen	12–21, 21–11, 18–21	(silver) Runner-up
2019	Dubai Para-Badminton International	(Hong Kong) Chan Ho Yuen	15–21, 21–13, 21–19	(gold) Winner
2019	Canada Para-Badminton International	(Hong Kong) Chan Ho Yuen	17–21, 11–21	(silver) Runner-up
2019	Irish Para-Badminton International	(Hong Kong) Chan Ho Yuen	21–12, 21–19	(gold) Winner
2019	Thailand Para-Badminton International	(Hong Kong) Chan Ho Yuen	19–21, 17–21	(silver) Runner-up
2019	Japan Para-Badminton International	(Hong Kong) Chan Ho Yuen	21–18, 21–14	(gold) Winner
2020	Brazil Para-Badminton International	(Israel) Amir Levi	21–17, 18–21, 21–10	(gold) Winner
2020	Peru Para-Badminton International	(Japan) Daiki Kajiwara	21–13, 21–14	(gold) Winner
2021	Spanish Para-Badminton International	(Switzerland) Luca Olgiati	21–10, 21–12	(gold) Winner

Men's doubles WH1–WH2

Year	Tournament	Partner	Opponent	Score	Result
2013	Spanish Para-Badminton International	(South Korea) Lee Sam-seop	(France) Sébastien Martin (Japan) Seiji Yamami	21–9, 21–8	(gold) Winner
2013	Spanish Para-Badminton International	(South Korea) Lee Sam-seop	(Spain) Javier Fernández (Spain) Roberto Galdos	21–11, 21–8	(gold) Winner
2013	Spanish Para-Badminton International	(South Korea) Lee Sam-seop	(France) David Toupé (Germany) Thomas Wandschneider	21–11, 21–14	(gold) Winner
2014	England-Para Badminton Championships	(South Korea) Lee Sam-seop	(Hong Kong) Chan Ho Yuen (Thailand) Jakarin Homhual	21–15, 21–8	(gold) Winner
2016	Irish Para-Badminton International	(South Korea) Lee Sam-seop	(France) David Toupé (Germany) Thomas Wandschneider	21–14, 21–9	(gold) Winner
2017	Spanish Para-Badminton International	(South Korea) Choi Jung-man	(South Korea) Kim Kyung-hoon (South Korea) Lee Sam-seop	21–14, 21–15	(gold) Winner
2017	Thailand Para-Badminton International	(South Korea) Lee Sam-seop	(South Korea) Kim Kyung-hoon (South Korea) Lee Dong-seop	21–16, 21–12	(gold) Winner
2017	Japan Para-Badminton International	(South Korea) Choi Jung-man	(South Korea) Kim Kyung-hoon (South Korea) Lee Sam-seop	21–16, 18–21, 19–21	(silver) Runner-up
2017	USA Para-Badminton International	(South Korea) Lee Sam-seop	(Hong Kong) Chan Ho Yuen (Japan) Osamu Nagashima	21–11, 21–16	(gold) Winner
2018	Spanish Para-Badminton International	(South Korea) Choi Jung-man	(South Korea) Jeong Jae-gun (South Korea) Lee Sam-seop	16–21, 21–11, 21–12	(gold) Winner
2018	Thailand Para-Badminton International	(South Korea) Lee Dong-seop	(South Korea) Choi Jung-man (South Korea) Lee Sam-seop	19–21, 19–21	(gold) Winner
2018	Australia Para-Badminton International	(South Korea) Choi Jung-man	(Israel) Amir Levi (France) David Toupé	21–8, 21–17	(gold) Winner
2019	Turkish Para-Badminton International	(South Korea) Lee Sam-seop	(China) Mai Jianpeng (China) Qu Zimo	11–21, 21–18, 14–21	(silver) Runner-up
2018	Canada Para-Badminton International	(South Korea) Lee Dong-seop	(South Korea) Choi Jung-man (South Korea) Kim Kyung-hoon	21–10, 21–17	(gold) Winner
2019	Irish Para-Badminton International	(South Korea) Lee Sam-seop	(Thailand) Chatchai Kornpeekanok (Thailand) Aphichat Sumpradit	21–6, 21–13	(gold) Winner
2018	Irish Para-Badminton International	(South Korea) Lee Sam-seop	(South Korea) Jeong Jae-gun (South Korea) Kim Kyung-hoon	19–21, 21–11, 24–22	(gold) Winner
2019	Japan Para-Badminton International	(South Korea) Lee Dong-seop	(China) Mai Jianpeng (China) Qu Zimo	12–21, 13–21	(silver) Runner-up
2020	Peru Para-Badminton International	(South Korea) Lee Dong-seop	(Japan) Daiki Kajiwara (Japan) Hiroshi Murayama	22–20, 15–21, 21–18	(gold) Winner
2021	Spanish Para-Badminton International	(South Korea) Lee Dong-seop	(South Korea) Kim Kyung-hoon (South Korea) Lee Sam-seop	21–12, 21–15	(gold) Winner

Mixed doubles WH1–WH2
Year	Tournament	Partner	Opponent	Score	Result
2015	China Para-Badminton International	(Japan) Ikumi Fuke	(China) Mai Jianpeng (China) Wang Ping	17–21, 12–21	(silver) Runner-up
2017	Spanish Para-Badminton International	(South Korea) Kim Seung-suk	(Hong Kong) Chan Ho Yuen (Belgium) To Man-kei	21–11, 12–21, 21–11	(gold) Winner
2017	Spanish Para-Badminton International	(South Korea) Choi Jung-man	(South Korea) Kim Kyung-hoon (South Korea) Lee Sam-seop	21–14, 21–15	(gold) Winner
2017	Japan Para-Badminton International	(South Korea) Kim Seung-suk	(Thailand) Jakarin Homhual (Thailand) Amnouy Wetwithan	21–14, 24–22	(gold) Winner
2017	USA Para-Badminton International	(South Korea) Kang Jung-kum	(Japan) Osamu Nagashima (Japan) Yuma Yamazaki	18–21, 21–8, 21–16	(gold) Winner
2018	Thailand Para-Badminton International	(South Korea) Son Ok-cha	(Japan) Osamu Nagashima (Japan) Yuma Yamazaki	12–21, 14–21	(silver) Runner-up
2018	Australia Para-Badminton International	(South Korea) Kim Seung-suk	(Japan) Hiroshi Murayama (Japan) Rie Ogura	11–21, 21–14, 21–18	(gold) Winner
