= Badminton at the 2020 Summer Paralympics – Men's doubles WH1–WH2 =

Men's doubles WH1–WH2 at the XVI Paralympic Games
- Venue: Yoyogi National Gymnasium
- Dates: 2–5 September 2021
- Competitors: 12 from 6 nations

Medalists
1st place, gold medalist(s)		Mai Jianpeng; Qu Zimo	China
2nd place, silver medalist(s)		Kim Jung-jun; Lee Dong-seop	South Korea
3rd place, bronze medalist(s)		Daiki Kajiwara; Hiroshi Murayama	Japan

The men's doubles WH1–WH2 tournament at the 2020 Summer Paralympics in Tokyo took place between 2 and 5 September 2021 at Yoyogi National Gymnasium.

== Seeds ==
These were the seeds for this event:

1. Mai Jianpeng / Qu Zimo (CHN) (gold medalists)
2. Kim Jung-jun / Lee Dong-seop (KOR) (silver medalists)

== Group stage ==
The draw of the group stage revealed on 26 August 2021. The group stage was played from 2 to 3 September. The top two winners of each group advanced to the knockout rounds.

=== Group A ===
Pos	Team	Pld	W	L	GF	GA	GD	PF	PA	PD	Pts	Qualification
1	Mai Jianpeng (CHN) (WH2) Qu Zimo (CHN) (WH1)	2	2	0	4	0	+4	84	41	+43	2	Advance to semi-finals
2	Daiki Kajiwara (JPN) (WH2) Hiroshi Murayama (JPN) (WH1) (H)	2	1	1	2	2	0	65	63	+2	1	Advance to semi-finals
3	Young-chin Mi (GER) (WH1) Thomas Wandschneider (GER) (WH1)	2	0	2	0	4	−4	39	84	−45	0	

Source: TOCOG
(H) Host

Date	Time	Player 1	Score	Player 2	Set 1	Set 2	Set 3
2 Sep	12:20	Mai Jianpeng (China); Qu Zimo (China)	2–0	(Germany) Young-chin Mi (Germany) Thomas Wandschneider	21–10	21–8	
3 Sep	09:00	Daiki Kajiwara (Japan); Hiroshi Murayama (Japan)	2–0	(Germany) Young-chin Mi (Germany) Thomas Wandschneider	21–12	21–9	
3 Sep	15:20	Mai Jianpeng (China); Qu Zimo (China)	2–0	(Japan) Daiki Kajiwara (Japan) Hiroshi Murayama	21–13	21–10	

=== Group B ===
Pos	Team	Pld	W	L	GF	GA	GD	PF	PA	PD	Pts	Qualification
1	Kim Jung-jun (KOR) (WH2) Lee Dong-seop (KOR) (WH1)	2	2	0	4	0	+4	84	55	+29	2	Advance to semi-finals
2	Jakarin Homhual (THA) (WH1) Dumnern Junthong (THA) (WH2)	2	1	1	2	2	0	73	72	+1	1	Advance to semi-finals
3	Thomas Jakobs (FRA) (WH2) David Toupé (FRA) (WH1)	2	0	2	0	4	−4	54	84	−30	0	

Source: TOCOG

Date	Time	Player 1	Score	Player 2	Set 1	Set 2	Set 3
2 Sep	12:20	Kim Jung-jun (South Korea); Lee Dong-seop (South Korea)	2–0	(Thailand) Jakarin Homhual (Thailand) Dumnern Junthong	21–19	21–12	
3 Sep	09:00	Thomas Jakobs (France); David Toupé (France)	0–2	(Thailand) Jakarin Homhual (Thailand) Dumnern Junthong	11–21	19–21	
3 Sep	14:40	Kim Jung-jun (South Korea); Lee Dong-seop (South Korea)	2–0	(France) Thomas Jakobs (France) David Toupé	21–11	21–13	

== Finals ==
The knockout stage was played from 4 to 5 September.

Semi-finals
A1	Mai Jianpeng (CHN); Qu Zimo (CHN)	21	21
A2	Daiki Kajiwara (JPN); Hiroshi Murayama (JPN)	8	17
B2	Jakarin Homhual (THA); Dumnern Junthong (THA)	18	13
B1	Kim Jung-jun (KOR); Lee Dong-seop (KOR)	21	21

Gold medal match
A1	Mai Jianpeng (CHN); Qu Zimo (CHN) (gold)	21	21
B1	Kim Jung-jun (KOR); Lee Dong-seop (KOR) (silver)	10	14
Bronze medal match
A2	Daiki Kajiwara (JPN); Hiroshi Murayama (JPN) (bronze)	21	21
B2	Jakarin Homhual (THA); Dumnern Junthong (THA)	18	19
