= Kim Kyung-hoon =

South Korean para-badminton player

Personal information
- Born: 5 March 1976 (age 50) Ulsan, South Korea

Sport
- Country: South Korea
- Sport: Badminton
- Handedness: Right

Men's singles WH2 Men's doubles WH1–WH2 Mixed doubles WH1–WH2
- Highest ranking: 4 (MS 2 April 2019); 3 (MD with Choi Jung-man 27 August 2019); 4 (XD with Kang Jung-kum 18 May 2021)
- Current ranking: 38 (MS); 2 (MD with Lee Sam-seop) (17 September 2024)
Medal record
Men's para-badminton
Representing South Korea
World Championships
Gold medal – first place	2013 Dortmund	Men's doubles
Gold medal – first place	2013 Dortmund	Mixed doubles
Gold medal – first place	2015 Stoke Mandeville	Men's doubles
Silver medal – second place	2013 Dortmund	Men's singles
Silver medal – second place	2015 Stoke Mandeville	Men's singles
Silver medal – second place	2017 Ulsan	Men's singles
Bronze medal – third place	2017 Ulsan	Men's doubles
Bronze medal – third place	2019 Basel	Men's singles
Bronze medal – third place	2019 Basel	Men's doubles
Bronze medal – third place	2019 Basel	Mixed doubles
Asian Para Games
Silver medal – second place	2014 Incheon	Men's singles
Silver medal – second place	2014 Incheon	Men's doubles
Silver medal – second place	2018 Jakarta	Men's doubles
Bronze medal – third place	2018 Jakarta	Men's singles
Asian Championships
Gold medal – first place	2008 Bangalore	Men's singles
Gold medal – first place	2008 Bangalore	Men's doubles
Gold medal – first place	2012 Yeoju	Men's singles
Gold medal – first place	2016 Beijing	Men's doubles
Silver medal – second place	2012 Yeoju	Men's doubles
Silver medal – second place	2012 Yeoju	Mixed doubles
Bronze medal – third place	2016 Beijing	Men's singles
Bronze medal – third place	2016 Beijing	Mixed doubles

Kim Kyung-hoon (Korean: 김경훈; born 5 March 1976) is a South Korean para-badminton player. He was a semi-finalist in the men's singles WH2 event at the 2020 Summer Paralympics in Tokyo. He lost in the bronze medal match to Chan Ho Yuen of Hong Kong.

== Biography ==
In 2000, Kim suffered a spinal cord injury while working at a chemical plant, paralyzing his lower extremities. In 2003, Kim spent three months at the National Rehabilitation Center in Seoul and discovered para-badminton which would eventually become one of his hobbies. He eventually turned the hobby into a career and began competing in international para-badminton tournaments.

In 2008, Kim participated in the 2008 Asian Paralympic Badminton Championships in Bangalore and won first place in both the men's singles event and the men's doubles event.

== Achievements ==
=== World Championships ===
Men's singles WH2
Year	Venue	Opponent	Score	Result
2013	Helmut-Körnig-Halle, Dortmund, Germany	(South Korea) Kim Jung-jun	15–21, 17–21	Silver
2015	Stoke Mandeville Stadium, Stoke Mandeville, England	(South Korea) Kim Jung-jun	19–21, 16–21	Silver
2017	Dongchun Gymnasium, Ulsan, South Korea	(South Korea) Kim Jung-jun	16–21, 19–21	Silver
2019	St. Jakobshalle; Basel, Switzerland	(Hong Kong) Chan Ho Yuen	20–22, 21–23	Bronze

Men's doubles WH1–WH2
Year	Venue	Partner	Opponent	Score	Result
2013	Helmut-Körnig-Halle; Dortmund, Germany	(South Korea) Kim Jung-jun	(England) Gobi Ranganathan (England) Martin Rooke	21–14, 21–19	Gold
2015	Stoke Mandeville Stadium; Stoke Mandeville, England	(South Korea) Lee Sam-seop	(South Korea) Kim Jung-jun (South Korea) Lee Dong-seop	21–17, 19–21, 26–24	Gold
2017	Dongchun Gymnasium; Ulsan, South Korea	(South Korea) Lee Dong-seop	(South Korea) Choi Jung-man (South Korea) Kim Sung-hun	16–21, 17–21	Bronze
2019	St. Jakobshalle; Basel, Switzerland	(South Korea) Choi Jung-man	(China) Mai Jianpeng (China) Qu Zimo	19–21, 13–21	Bronze

Mixed doubles WH1–WH2
Year	Venue	Partner	Opponent	Score	Result
2013	Helmut-Körnig-Halle; Dortmund, Germany	(South Korea) Lee Sun-ae	(Turkey) Avni Kertmen (Turkey) Emine Seçkin	21–8, 21–15	Gold
2019	St. Jakobshalle; Basel, Switzerland	(South Korea) Kang Jung-kum	(Thailand) Jakarin Homhual (Thailand) Amnouy Wetwithan	11–21, 21–19, 13–21	Bronze

=== Asian Para Games ===
Men's singles WH2
Year	Venue	Opponent	Score	Result
2014	Gyeyang Gymnasium; Incheon, South Korea	(South Korea) Kim Jung-jun	12–21, 21–14, 13–21	Silver
2018	Istora Gelora Bung Karno; Jakarta, Indonesia	(South Korea) Kim Jung-jun	16–21, 18–21	Bronze

Men's doubles WH1–WH2

Year	Venue	Partner	Opponent	Score	Result
2014 (Note: This tournament uses a round robin system.)	Gyeyang Gymnasium, Incheon, South Korea	(South Korea) Lee Sam-seop	(South Korea) Choi Jung-man (South Korea) Kim Sung-hun	15–21, 21–13, 17–21	Silver
2014	Gyeyang Gymnasium, Incheon, South Korea	(South Korea) Lee Sam-seop	(Japan) Osamu Nagashima (Japan) Seiji Yamami	21–12, 21–12	Silver
2014	Gyeyang Gymnasium, Incheon, South Korea	(South Korea) Lee Sam-seop	(Vietnam) Trần Mai Anh (Vietnam) Trương Ngọc Bình	21–12, 21–16	Silver
2014	Gyeyang Gymnasium, Incheon, South Korea	(South Korea) Lee Sam-seop	(Thailand) Jakarin Homhual (Thailand) Dumnern Junthong	21–13, 21–14	Silver
2018	Istora Gelora Bung Karno, Jakarta, Indonesia	(South Korea) Choi Jung-man	(China) Mai Jianpeng (China) Qu Zimo	19–21, 15–21	Silver

=== Asian Championships ===
Men's singles WH2
Year	Venue	Opponent	Score	Result
2008	Raheja Stadium, Bangalore, India			Gold
2012	Yeo-ju Sports Center, Yeoju, South Korea	(South Korea) Kim Sung-hun	21–16, 15–21, 21–16	Gold
2016	China Administration of Sport for Persons with Disabilities; Beijing, China	(China) Mai Jianpeng	21–5, 21–12	Bronze

Men's doubles WH1–WH2
Year	Venue	Partner	Opponent	Score	Result
2008	Raheja Stadium; Bangalore, India			Gold	
2012	Yeo-ju Sports Center; Yeoju, South Korea	(South Korea) Kim Sung-hun	(South Korea) Lee Dong-seop (South Korea) Shim Jae-yeol	21–16, 19–21, 17–21	Silver
2016	China Administration of Sport for Persons with Disabilities; Beijing, China	(South Korea) Lee Dong-seop	(South Korea) Kim Jung-jun (South Korea) Lee Sam-seop	21–17, 21–16	Gold

Mixed doubles WH1–WH2

Year	Venue	Partner	Opponent	Score	Result
2012	Yeo-ju Sports Center, Yeoju, South Korea	(South Korea) Kim Yun-sim	(South Korea) Kim Sung-hun (South Korea) Lee Sun-ae	19–21, 19–21	Silver
2012	Yeo-ju Sports Center, Yeoju, South Korea	(South Korea) Kim Yun-sim	(Japan) Osamu Nagashima (Japan) Yoko Egami	21–11, 21–12	Silver
2012	Yeo-ju Sports Center, Yeoju, South Korea	(South Korea) Kim Yun-sim	(Japan) Tsutomu Shimada (Japan) Rie Ogura	21–5, 21–10	Silver
2016	China Administration of Sport for Persons with Disabilities, Beijing, China	(South Korea) Kim Seung-suk	(Thailand) Jakarin Homhual (Thailand) Amnouy Wetwithan	18–21, 13–21	(gold) Bronze

=== BWF Para Badminton World Circuit (1 title, 2 runner-up) ===
The BWF Para Badminton World Circuit – Grade 2, Level 1, 2 and 3 tournaments has been sanctioned by the Badminton World Federation from 2022.

Men's singles WH2
Year	Tournament	Level	Opponent	Score	Result
2023	Western Australia Para-Badminton International	Level 2	(South Korea) Kim Jung-jun	12–21, 17–21	(silver) Runner-up

Men's doubles WH1–WH2
Year	Tournament	Level	Partner	Opponent	Score	Result
2022	Canada Para-Badminton International	Level 1	(South Korea) Lee Sam-seop	(South Korea) Jeong Jae-gun (South Korea) Kim Jung-jun	22–20, 11–21, 21–18	(gold) Winner
2024	Indonesia Para-Badminton International	Level 2	(South Korea) Lee Sam-seop	(South Korea) Kim Jung-jun (South Korea) Ryu Dong-hyun	20–22, 21–17, 20–22	(silver) Runner-up

=== International tournaments (2011–2021) (9 titles, 11 runners-up) ===
Men's singles WH2

Year	Tournament	Opponent	Score	Result
2013	Spanish Para-Badminton International	(England) Gobi Ranganathan	21–7, 21–5	(gold) Winner
2013	Spanish Para-Badminton International	(France) François Nalborczyk	21–3, 21–8	(gold) Winner
2013	Spanish Para-Badminton International	(England) Martin Rooke	21–11, 21–16	(gold) Winner
2013	Spanish Para-Badminton International	(Hong Kong) Chan Ho Yuen	21–11, 21–19	(gold) Winner
2014	England Para-Badminton Championships	(South Korea) Kim Jung-jun	17–21, 21–14, 19–21	(silver) Runner-up
2015	China Para-Badminton International	(South Korea) Kim Jung-jun	19–21, 14–21	(silver) Runner-up
2016	Irish Para-Badminton International	(South Korea) Kim Jung-jun	20–22, 19–21	(silver) Runner-up
2017	Spanish Para-Badminton International	(South Korea) Kim Jung-jun	12–21, 21–23	(silver) Runner-up
2017	Irish Para-Badminton International	(Hong Kong) Chan Ho Yuen	17–21, 21–19, 21–14	(gold) Winner

Men's doubles WH1–WH2
Year	Tournament	Partner	Opponent	Score	Result
2015	China Para-Badminton International	(South Korea) Lee Sam-seop	(Hong Kong) Chan Ho Yuen (France) David Toupé	21–10, 21–14	(gold) Winner
2017	Spanish Para-Badminton International	(South Korea) Lee Sam-seop	(South Korea) Choi Jung-man (South Korea) Kim Jung-jun	14–21, 15–21	(silver) Runner-up
2017	Thailand Para-Badminton International	(South Korea) Lee Dong-seop	(South Korea) Kim Jung-jun (South Korea) Lee Sam-seop	16–21, 12–21	(silver) Runner-up
2017	Irish Para-Badminton International	(South Korea) Lee Sam-seop	(Hong Kong) Chan Ho Yuen (Germany) Thomas Wandschneider	21–19, 21–17	(gold) Winner
2017	Japan Para-Badminton International	(South Korea) Lee Sam-seop	(South Korea) Choi Jung-man (South Korea) Kim Jung-jun	16–21, 21–18, 21–19	(gold) Winner
2018	Irish Para-Badminton International	(South Korea) Lee Sam-seop	(England) Martin Rooke (Germany) Thomas Wandschneider	21–17, 21–13	(gold) Winner
2018	Thailand Para-Badminton International	(South Korea) Choi Jung-man	(South Korea) Kim Jung-jun (South Korea) Lee Dong-seop	21–19, 21–19	(gold) Winner
2019	Dubai Para-Badminton International	(South Korea) Jeong Jae-gun	(Japan) Daiki Kajiwara (Japan) Hiroshi Murayama	21–17, 21–7	(gold) Winner
2019	Canada Para-Badminton International	(South Korea) Choi Jung-man	(South Korea) Kim Jung-jun (South Korea) Lee Dong-seop	10–21, 17–21	(silver) Runner-up
2019	Thailand Para-Badminton International	(South Korea) Jeong Jae-gun	(South Korea) Kim Jung-jun (South Korea) Lee Sam-seop	21–19, 11–21, 22–24	(silver) Runner-up
2021	Spanish Para-Badminton International	(South Korea) Lee Sam-seop	(South Korea) Kim Jung-jun (South Korea) Lee Dong-seop	12–21, 15–21	(silver) Runner-up

Mixed doubles WH1–WH2
Year	Tournament	Partner	Opponent	Score	Result
2013	Spanish Para-Badminton International	(Japan) Etsuko Kobayashi	(England) Gobi Ranganathan (Netherlands) Ilse van de Burgwal	19–21, 10–21	(silver) Runner-up
2019	Canada Para-Badminton International	(South Korea) Kang Jung-kum	(South Korea) Lee Dong-seop (South Korea) Lee Sun-ae	12–21, 16–21	(silver) Runner-up
2021	Spanish Para-Badminton International	(South Korea) Kang Jung-kum	(Italy) Yuri Ferrigno (Peru) Pilar Jáuregui	18–21, 21–9, 21–16	(gold) Winner
