= Chan Ho Yuen =

Hong Kong para-badminton player

Chan Ho Yuen 陳浩源
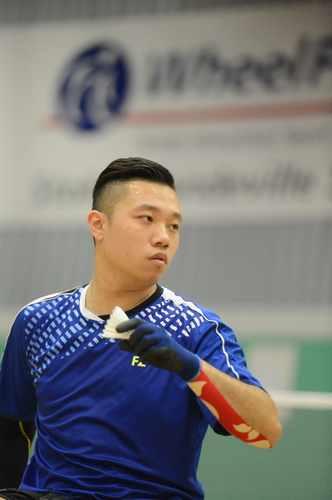

Personal information
- Born: 17 January 1985 (age 41) Hong Kong
- Height: 1.81 m (5 ft 11 in)

Sport
- Country: Hong Kong
- Sport: Badminton
- Handedness: Right

Men’s singles WH2 Mixed doubles WH1–WH2
- Highest ranking: 2 (MS 1 January 2019); 1 (XD with Man-Kei To 24 June 2024)
- Current ranking: 1 (MS); 1 (XD with Man-Kei To) (3 September 2024)
- BWF profile
Medal record
Men's para-badminton
Representing Hong Kong
Paralympic Games
| Silver medal – second place | 2024 Paris | Men's singles |
| Bronze medal – third place | 2020 Tokyo | Men's singles |
World Championships
| Silver medal – second place | 2019 Basel | Men's singles |
| Bronze medal – third place | 2013 Dortmund | Men's singles |
| Bronze medal – third place | 2013 Dortmund | Men's doubles |
| Bronze medal – third place | 2015 Stoke Mandeville | Men's singles |
| Bronze medal – third place | 2015 Stoke Mandeville | Men's doubles |
| Bronze medal – third place | 2017 Ulsan | Men's singles |
| Bronze medal – third place | 2022 Tokyo | Men's singles |
Asian Para Games
| Silver medal – second place | 2018 Jakarta | Men's singles |
| Bronze medal – third place | 2022 Hangzhou | Men's singles |
Asian Championships
| Bronze medal – third place | 2012 Yeoju | Men's doubles |
| Bronze medal – third place | 2016 Beijing | Men's singles |
| Bronze medal – third place | 2016 Beijing | Men's doubles |

Daniel Chan Ho-yuen MH (born 17 January 1985) is a retired Hong Kong para-badminton player who won bronze medal at the 2020 Summer Paralympics and silver medal at the 2024 Summer Paralympics.

== Personal life ==
Chan grew up in Shek Wai Kok Estate in Tsuen Wan. He was a member of the Tsuen Wan District youth badminton team and also played soccer. During a work travel in China in 2008, he was seriously injured in a car accident and had his left leg below his knee amputated. After the accident, he became the first para-badminton player in Hong Kong. In 2016, he enrolled in the Bachelor of Arts (honours) in physical education and recreation management program offered by Hong Kong Baptist University.

Chan married his highschool sweetheart Sandy in 2013.

== Career ==
He began representing Hong Kong in international competitions since 2009. In 2015 and 2019, he was named as one of the winners for the Hong Kong Sports Stars Awards. He won silver in the WH2 class at the 2018 Asian Para Games. He won the first medal for Hong Kong at the Paralympic Games in para-badminton event in 2021. His main rival is said to be Kim Jung-jun.

Because of his achievements in para-badminton, Chan was named as Ten Outstanding Young Persons Selection in 2019. He was awarded the Medal of Honour in 2022.

In 2024 Paris Paralympics, he won a silver medal in Men's singles WH2 class. After the Games, he announced his retirement from the sport.

== Achievements ==
=== Paralympic Games ===
Men's singles WH2

| Year | Venue | Opponent | Score | Result |
|---|---|---|---|---|
| 2020 | Yoyogi National Gymnasium, Tokyo, Japan | (South Korea) Kim Kyung-hoon | 24–22, 21–10 | Bronze |
| 2024 | Porte de La Chapelle Arena, Paris, France | (Japan) Daiki Kajiwara | 10–21, 10–21 | Silver |

=== World Championships ===
Men's singles WH2

| Year | Venue | Opponent | Score | 𝖸𝖾𝗌 |
|---|---|---|---|---|
| 2013 | Helmut-Koernig-Halle, Dortmund, Germany | (South Korea) Kim Jung-jun | 9–21, 14–21 | Bronze |
| 2015 | Stoke Mandeville Stadium, Stoke Mandeville, England | (South Korea) Kim Jung-jun | 18–21, 13–21 | Bronze |
| 2017 | Dongchun Gymnasium, Ulsan, South Korea | (South Korea) Kim Kyung-hoon | 11–21, 21–12, 18–21 | Bronze |
| 2019 | St. Jakobshalle, Basel, Switzerland | (South Korea) Kim Jung-jun | 18–21, 21–13, 18–21 | Silver |
| 2022 | Yoyogi National Gymnasium, Tokyo, Japan | (South Korea) Kim Jung-jun | 21–16, 17–21, 15–21 | Bronze |

Men's doubles WH1–WH2
| Year | Venue | Partner | Opponent | Score | Result |
|---|---|---|---|---|---|
| 2013 | Helmut-Koernig-Halle, Dortmund, Germany | (India) Sanjeev Kumar | (England) Gobi Ranganathan (England) Martin Rooke | 12–21, 14–21 | Bronze |
| 2015 | Stoke Mandeville Stadium, Stoke Mandeville, England | (Japan) Osamu Nagashima | (South Korea) Kim Jung-jun (South Korea) Lee Dong-seop | 9–21, 13–21 | Bronze |

=== Asian Para Games ===
Men's singles WH2
| Year | Venue | Opponent | Score | Result |
|---|---|---|---|---|
| 2018 | Istora Gelora Bung Karno; Jakarta, Indonesia | (South Korea) Kim Jung-jun | 21–15, 6–21, 17–21 | Silver |
| 2022 | Binjiang Gymnasium; Hangzhou, China | (Japan) Daiki Kajiwara | 20–22, 11–21 | Bronze |

=== Asian Championships ===
Men's singles WH2
| Year | Venue | Opponent | Score | Result |
|---|---|---|---|---|
| 2016 | China Administration of Sport for Persons with Disabilities; Beijing, China | (China) Mai Jianpeng | 21–13, 14–21, 18–21 | Bronze |

Men's doubles WH1–WH2
| Year | Venue | Partner | Opponent | Score | Result |
|---|---|---|---|---|---|
| 2012 | Yeo-ju Sports Center; Yeoju, South Korea | (Macau) Ip Chi Keong | (South Korea) Kim Kyung-hoon (South Korea) Kim Sung-hun | 6–21, 10–21 | Bronze |
| 2016 | China Administration of Sport for Persons with Disabilities; Beijing, China | (Japan) Osamu Nagashima | (South Korea) Kim Jung-jun (South Korea) Lee Sam-seop | 9–21, 10–21 | Bronze |

=== BWF Para Badminton World Circuit (9 titles, 9 runners-up) ===
The BWF Para Badminton World Circuit – Grade 2, Level 1, 2 and 3 tournaments has been sanctioned by the Badminton World Federation from 2022.

Men's singles WH2
| Year | Tournament | Level | Opponent | Score | Result |
|---|---|---|---|---|---|
| 2022 | Dubai Para-Badminton International | Level 2 | (Japan) Daiki Kajiwara | 21–16, 5–21, 19–21 | (silver) Runner-up |
| 2022 | 4 Nations Para-Badminton International | Level 1 | (Japan) Daiki Kajiwara | 9–21, 6–11 retired | (silver) Runner-up |
| 2023 | Brazil Para-Badminton International | Level 2 | (Japan) Daiki Kajiwara | 17–21, 10–21 | (silver) Runner-up |
| 2023 | Bahrain Para-Badminton International | Level 2 | (Japan) Daiki Kajiwara | 14–21, 17–21 | (silver) Runner-up |
| 2023 | Canada Para-Badminton International | Level 1 | (Japan) Daiki Kajiwara | 15–21, 1–21 | (silver) Runner-up |
| 2023 | Japan Para-Badminton International | Level 2 | (Japan) Daiki Kajiwara | 15–21, 15–21 | (silver) Runner-up |
| 2023 | Dubai Para-Badminton International | Level 1 | (Japan) Daiki Kajiwara | 14–21, 15–21 | (silver) Runner-up |
| 2024 | Bahrain Para-Badminton International | Level 2 | (France) Thomas Jakobs | 16–21, 21–15, 21–17 | (gold) Winner |
| 2024 | 4 Nations Para-Badminton International | Level 1 | (Japan) Daiki Kajiwara | 16–21, 12–21 | (silver) Runner-up |

Mixed doubles WH1–WH2

| Year | Tournament | Level | Partner | Opponent | Score | Result |
|---|---|---|---|---|---|---|
| 2023 | Thailand Para-Badminton International | Level 2 | (Belgium) To Man-kei | (Israel) Konstantin Afinogenov (Switzerland) Ilaria Renggli | 19–21, 21–19, 22–20 | (gold) Winner |
| 2023 | Bahrain Para-Badminton International | Level 2 | (Belgium) To Man-kei | (India) Prem Kumar Ale (Turkey) Emine Seçkin | 21–18, 21–19 | (gold) Winner |
| 2023 | Japan Para-Badminton International | Level 2 | (Belgium) To Man-kei | (Malaysia) Chew Jit Thye (India) Alphia James | 21–7, 21–9 | (gold) Winner |
| 2023 | Dubai Para-Badminton International | Level 1 | (Belgium) To Man-kei | (South Korea) Choi Jung-man (South Korea) Jung Gye-oul | 18–21, 21–18, 15–21 | (silver) Runner-up |
| 2024 | Spanish Para-Badminton International II | Level 2 | (Belgium) To Man-kei | (South Korea) Park Hae-seong (Switzerland) Ilaria Renggli | 17–21, 21–17, 21–18 | (gold) Winner |
| 2024 | Bahrain Para-Badminton International | Level 2 | (Belgium) To Man-kei | (Iraq) Mohammed Jawad Kadhim (India) Alphia James | 21–9, 21–10 | (gold) Winner |
| 2024 | Bahrain Para-Badminton International | Level 2 | (Belgium) To Man-kei | (Czech Republic) Zbyněk Sýkora (Bahrain) Fatema Asad | 21–9, 21–10 | (gold) Winner |
| 2024 | Bahrain Para-Badminton International | Level 2 | (Belgium) To Man-kei | (Italy) Yuri Ferrigno (Switzerland) Ilaria Renggli | 21–15, 21–19 | (gold) Winner |
| 2024 | Bahrain Para-Badminton International | Level 2 | (Belgium) To Man-kei | (Czech Republic) Kamil Šnajdar (Germany) Annika Schroeder | Walkover | (gold) Winner |

=== International tournaments (2011–2021) (18 titles, 16 runners-up) ===
Men's singles WH2
| Year | Tournament | Opponent | Score | Result |
|---|---|---|---|---|
| 2014 | Spanish Para-Badminton International | (South Korea) Kim Sun-cheol | 21–11, 21–17 | (gold) Winner |
| 2015 | Spanish Para-Badminton International | (Malaysia) Madzlan Saibon | 22–24, 20–22 | (silver) Runner-up |
| 2015 | Irish Para-Badminton International | (Netherlands) Jordy Brouwer | 21–7, 21–2 | (gold) Winner |
| 2015 | Indonesia Para-Badminton International | (Malaysia) Madzlan Saibon | 11–21, 21–17, 19–21 | (silver) Runner-up |
| 2016 | Indonesia Para-Badminton International | (South Korea) Lee Yong-ho | 21–11, 21–11 | (gold) Winner |
| 2017 | Thailand Para-Badminton International | (South Korea) Kim Jung-jun | 21–18, 21–12 | (gold) Winner |
| 2017 | Irish Para-Badminton International | (South Korea) Kim Kyung-hoon | 21–17, 19–21, 14–21 | (silver) Runner-up |
| 2017 | Japan Para-Badminton International | (South Korea) Kim Jung-jun | 20–22, 13–21 | (silver) Runner-up |
| 2018 | Spanish Para-Badminton International | (South Korea) Kim Jung-jun | 7–21, 13–21 | (silver) Runner-up |
| 2018 | Dubai Para-Badminton International | (Malaysia) Madzlan Saibon | 21–15, 21–11 | (gold) Winner |
| 2018 | Irish Para-Badminton International | (Malaysia) Madzlan Saibon | 21–12, 25–23 | (gold) Winner |
| 2018 | Thailand Para-Badminton International | (South Korea) Kim Jung-jun | 25–27, 21–18, 16–21 | (silver) Runner-up |
| 2018 | Australia Para-Badminton International | (South Korea) Kim Jung-jun | 21–14, 18–21, 21–13 | (gold) Winner |
| 2019 | Turkish Para-Badminton International | (South Korea) Kim Jung-jun | 21–12, 11–21, 21–18 | (gold) Winner |
| 2019 | Dubai Para-Badminton International | (South Korea) Kim Jung-jun | 21–15, 13–21, 19–21 | (silver) Runner-up |
| 2019 | Canada Para-Badminton International | (South Korea) Kim Jung-jun | 21–17, 21–11 | (gold) Winner |
| 2019 | Irish Para-Badminton International | (South Korea) Kim Jung-jun | 12–21, 19–21 | (silver) Runner-up |
| 2019 | Thailand Para-Badminton International | (South Korea) Kim Jung-jun | 21–19, 21–17 | (gold) Winner |
| 2019 | China Para-Badminton International | (China) Zhao Xin | 21–10, 21–5 | (gold) Winner |
| 2019 | Japan Para-Badminton International | (South Korea) Kim Jung-jun | 18–21, 14–21 | (silver) Runner-up |

Men's doubles WH1–WH2
| Year | Tournament | Partner | Opponent | Score | Result |
|---|---|---|---|---|---|
| 2013 | Spanish Para-Badminton International | (South Korea) Kim Kyung-hoon | (England) Gobi Ranganathan (England) Martin Rooke | 21–15, 21–6 | (gold) Winner |
| 2014 | England Para-Badminton Championships | (Thailand) Jakarin Homhual | (South Korea) Kim Jung-jun (South Korea) Lee Sam-seop | 15–21, 8–21 | (silver) Runner-up |
| 2015 | China Para-Badminton International | (France) David Toupé | (South Korea) Kim Kyung-hoon (South Korea) Lee Sam-seop | 10–21, 14–21 | (silver) Runner-up |
| 2015 | Irish Para-Badminton International | (France) David Toupé | (England) Connor Dua-Harper (England) David Follett | 21–6, 21–12 | (gold) Winner |
| 2016 | Indonesia Para-Badminton International | (South Korea) Lee Yong-ho | (Thailand) Chatchai Kornpeekanok (Thailand) Aphichat Sumpradit | 21–16, 21–11 | (gold) Winner |
| 2016 | Irish Para-Badminton International | (Germany) Thomas Wandschneider | (South Korea) Kim Kyung-hoon (South Korea) Lee Sam-seop | 19–21, 17–21 | (silver) Runner-up |
| 2017 | USA Para-Badminton International | (Japan) Osamu Nagashima | (South Korea) Kim Jung-jun (South Korea) Lee Sam-seop | 11–21, 16–21 | (silver) Runner-up |
| 2018 | Dubai Para-Badminton International | (France) David Toupé | (Malaysia) Muhammad Ikhwan Ramli (Malaysia) Madzlan Saibon | 21–11, 21–23, 23–21 | (gold) Winner |

Mixed doubles WH1–WH2
| Year | Tournament | Partner | Opponent | Score | Result |
|---|---|---|---|---|---|
| 2015 | Irish Para-Badminton International | (Switzerland) Karin Suter-Erath | (France) David Toupé (Switzerland) Sonja Häsler | 21–14, 16–21, 21–14 | (gold) Winner |
| 2015 | Indonesia Para-Badminton International | (Switzerland) Karin Suter-Erath | (Thailand) Jakarin Homhual (Thailand) Amnouy Wetwithan | 21–19, 11–21, 21–23 | (silver) Runner-up |
| 2016 | Irish Para-Badminton International | (Israel) Nina Gorodetzky | (South Korea) Lee Sam-seop (Japan) Yuma Yamazaki | 21–17, 21–15 | (gold) Winner |
| 2016 | Indonesia Para-Badminton International | (South Korea) Lee Yong-ho | (Thailand) Chatchai Kornpeekanok (Thailand) Aphichat Sumpradit | 21–16, 21–11 | (gold) Winner |
| 2017 | Spanish Para-Badminton International | (Belgium) To Man-kei | (South Korea) Kim Jung-jun (South Korea) Kim Seung-suk | 11–21, 21–12, 11–21 | (silver) Runner-up |
