= Yu Soo-young =

South Korean para-badminton player

Personal information
- Born: 27 November 2002 (age 23) Gunsan, South Korea
- Height: 1.74 m (5 ft 9 in)

Sport
- Country: South Korea
- Sport: Badminton
- Handedness: Right

Men's singles WH2 Men's doubles WH1–WH2 Mixed doubles WH1–WH2
- Highest ranking: 3 (MS 23 April 2024); 3 (MD with Jeong Jae-gun 3 September 2024); 1 (XD with Kwon Hyun-ah 13 June 2023)
- Current ranking: 4 (MS); 3 (MD with Jeong Jae-gun); 7 (XD with Kwon Hyun-ah) (3 September 2024)
Medal record
Men's para-badminton
Representing South Korea
Paralympic Games
Silver medal – second place	2024 Paris	Men's doubles
World Championships
Silver medal – second place	2024 Pattaya	Men's singles
Silver medal – second place	2026 Manama	Men's singles
Silver medal – second place	2026 Manama	Men's doubles
Bronze medal – third place	2022 Tokyo	Men's doubles
Bronze medal – third place	2022 Tokyo	Mixed doubles
Asian Para Games
Silver medal – second place	2022 Hangzhou	Men's singles
Bronze medal – third place	2022 Hangzhou	Men's doubles
Asian Youth Para Games
Silver medal – second place	2021 Manama	Boys' singles

Yu Soo-young (Korean: 유수영; Hanja: 柳秀英, born 27 November 2002) is a South Korean para-badminton player. He competed at the 2024 Summer Paralympics, where he won the silver medal in the men's doubles WH1–WH2 event with Jeong Jae-gun.

== Achievements ==
=== Paralympic Games ===
Men's doubles WH1–WH2

Year	Venue	Partner	Opponent	Score	Result
2024	Porte de la Chapelle Arena, Paris, France	(South Korea) Jeong Jae-gun	(China) Mai Jianpeng (China) Qu Zimo	10–21, 12–21	Silver

=== World Championships ===
Men's singles WH2
Year	Venue	Opponent	Score	Result
2024	Pattaya Exhibition and Convention Hall; Pattaya, Thailand	(Japan) Daiki Kajiwara	16–21, 10–21	Silver
2026	Isa Sports City, Manama, Bahrain	(Japan) Daiki Kajiwara	21–23, 13–21	Silver

Men's doubles WH1–WH2
Year	Venue	Partner	Opponent	Score	Result
2022	Yoyogi National Gymnasium, Tokyo, Japan	(South Korea) Jeong Jae-gun	(Germany) Rick Hellmann (Germany) Thomas Wandschneider	13–21, 21–18, 22–24	Bronze
2026	Isa Sports City, Manama, Bahrain	(South Korea) Park Hae-seong	(China) Mai Jianpeng (China) Qu Zimo	16–21, 17–21	Silver

Mixed doubles WH1–WH2
Year	Venue	Partner	Opponent	Score	Result
2022	Yoyogi National Gymnasium, Tokyo, Japan	(South Korea) Kwon Hyun-ah	(Italy) Yuri Ferrigno (Peru) Pilar Jáuregui	19–21, 21–13, 10–21	Bronze

=== Asian Para Games ===
Men's singles WH1
Year	Venue	Opponent	Score	Result
2022	Binjiang Gymnasium; Hangzhou, China	(Japan) Daiki Kajiwara	15–21, 9–21	Silver

Men's doubles WH1–WH2
Year	Venue	Partner	Opponent	Score	Result
2022	Binjiang Gymnasium; Hangzhou, China	(South Korea) Lee Sam-seop	(China) Mai Jianpeng (China) Qu Zimo	9–21, 12–21	Bronze

=== Asian Youth Para Games ===
Boys' singles WH2

Year	Venue	Opponent	Score	Result
2021	Alba Club, Manama, Bahrain	(Japan) Daiki Kajiwara	15–21, 11–21	Silver

=== BWF Para Badminton World Circuit (4 titles, 7 runners-up) ===
The BWF Para Badminton World Circuit – Grade 2, Level 1, 2 and 3 tournaments has been sanctioned by the Badminton World Federation from 2022.

Men's singles WH2
Year	Tournament	Level	Opponent	Score	Result
2022	Bahrain Para Badminton International	Level 2	(Japan) Daiki Kajiwara	9–21, 6–21	(silver) Runner-up
2022	Dubai Para Badminton International	Level 2	(Japan) Daiki Kajiwara	10–21, 9–21	(silver) Runner-up
2023	Thailand Para Badminton International	Level 2	(Japan) Daiki Kajiwara	20–22, 13–21	(silver) Runner-up

Men's doubles WH1–WH2
Year	Tournament	Level	Partner	Opponent	Score	Result
2022	Thailand Para Badminton International	Level 1	(South Korea) Jeong Jae-gun	(South Korea) Choi Jung-man (South Korea) Kim Jung-jun	9–21, 12–21	(silver) Runner-up
2024	Spanish Para Badminton International I	Level 1	(South Korea) Jeong Jae-gun	(Germany) Rick Hellmann (Germany) Thomas Wandschneider	21–14, 21–12	(gold) Winner
2024	4 Nations Para Badminton International	Level 1	(South Korea) Jeong Jae-gun	(Japan) Daiki Kajiwara (Japan) Hiroshi Murayama	21–14, 21–14	(gold) Winner

Mixed doubles WH1–WH2
Year	Tournament	Level	Partner	Opponent	Score	Result
2022	Bahrain Para Badminton International	Level 2	(South Korea) Kwon Hyun-ah	(Thailand) Chatchai Kornpeekanok (Thailand) Amnouy Wetwithan	17–21, 21–16, 21–13	(gold) Winner
2022	Dubai Para Badminton International	Level 2	(South Korea) Kwon Hyun-ah	(South Korea) Choi Jung-man (South Korea) Lee Sun-ae	21–16, 12–21, 21–17	(gold) Winner
2023	Spanish Para Badminton International II	Level 2	(South Korea) Kwon Hyun-ah	(Italy) Yuri Ferrigno (Peru) Pilar Jáuregui	21–23, 19–21	(silver) Runner-up
2023	Spanish Para Badminton International I	Level 1	(South Korea) Kwon Hyun-ah	(South Korea) Choi Jung-man (South Korea) Lee Sun-ae	21–19, 19–21, 21–23	(silver) Runner-up
2023	Brazil Para Badminton International	Level 2	(South Korea) Kwon Hyun-ah	(Italy) Yuri Ferrigno (Peru) Pilar Jáuregui	15–21, 15–21	(silver) Runner-up
