= Daiki Kajiwara =

Japanese para-badminton player

Daiki Kajiwara 梶原 大暉
Personal information
- Born: 13 November 2001 (age 24) Fukuoka, Fukuoka Prefecture, Japan

Sport
- Country: Japan
- Sport: Badminton

Men's singles WH2 Men's doubles WH1–WH2
- Highest ranking: 1 (MS 4 July 2022); 1 (MD with Keita Nishimura, 18 July 2022); 1 (MD with Hiroshi Murayama, 22 August 2023)
- Current ranking: 1 (MS); 3 (MD with Keita Nishimura) (24 February 2026)
- BWF profile
Medal record
Para-badminton
Representing Japan
Paralympic Games
Gold medal – first place	2020 Tokyo	Men's singles
Gold medal – first place	2024 Paris	Men's singles
Bronze medal – third place	2020 Tokyo	Men's doubles
Bronze medal – third place	2024 Paris	Men's doubles
World Championships
Gold medal – first place	2022 Tokyo	Men's singles
Gold medal – first place	2024 Pattaya	Men's singles
Gold medal – first place	2026 Manama	Men's singles
Bronze medal – third place	2026 Manama	Men's doubles
Asian Para Games
Gold medal – first place	2022 Hangzhou	Men's singles
Gold medal – first place	2026 Aichi-Nagoya	Men's singles
Bronze medal – third place	2026 Aichi-Nagoya	Men's doubles
Asian Championships
Gold medal – first place	2025 Nakhon Ratchasima	Men's singles
Silver medal – second place	2025 Nakhon Ratchasima	Men's doubles
Asian Youth Para Games
Gold medal – first place	2021 Manama	Boys' singles

Daiki Kajiwara (梶原 大暉, Kajiwara Daiki; born 13 November 2001) is a Japanese para badminton player. He graduated from Nippon Sport Science University. He won the gold medal in the men singles WH2 and bronze medal in the men doubles WH1–WH2 event of the 2020 Summer Paralympics and 2024 Summer Paralympics.

== Awards and nominations ==
Award	Year	Category	Result	Ref.
BWF Awards	2020/2021	BWF Male Para Badminton Player of The Year	Nominated	
BWF Awards	2022	BWF Male Para Badminton Player of The Year	Won	
BWF Awards	2023	BWF Male Para Badminton Player of The Year	Won	
BWF Awards	2024	BWF Male Para Badminton Player of The Year	Nominated	
Minoru Yoneyama Award	2022	2021 Minoru Yoneyama Award by Yonex Sports Foundation	Won	
Shinji Hattori Award	2022	Shinji Hattori Sports Award	Won	
Japan Para Sports Award	2023	Excellence Award	Won	

== Achievements ==
=== Paralympic Games ===
Men's singles WH2

Year	Venue	Opponent	Score	Result
2020	Yoyogi National Gymnasium, Tokyo, Japan	(South Korea) Kim Jung-jun	21–18, 21–19	Gold
2024	Porte de La Chapelle Arena, Paris, France	(Hong Kong) Chan Ho Yuen	21–10, 21–10	Gold

Men's doubles WH1–WH2

Year	Venue	Partner	Opponent	Score	Result
2020	Yoyogi National Gymnasium, Tokyo, Japan	(Japan) Hiroshi Murayama	(Thailand) Jakarin Homhual (Thailand) Dumnern Junthong	21–18, 21–19	Bronze
2024	Porte de La Chapelle Arena, Paris, France	(Japan) Hiroshi Murayama	(Japan) Takumi Matsumoto (Japan) Osamu Nagashima	19–21, 21–12, 21–15	Bronze

=== World Championships ===
Men's singles WH2
Year	Venue	Opponent	Score	Result
2022	Yoyogi National Gymnasium; Tokyo, Japan	(South Korea) Kim Jung-jun	21–12, 21–11	Gold
2024	Pattaya Exhibition and Convention Hall; Pattaya, Thailand	(South Korea) Yu Soo-young	21–16, 21–10	Gold
2026	Isa Sports City, Manama, Bahrain	(South Korea) Yu Soo-young	23–21, 21–13	Gold

Men's doubles WH1-WH2
Year	Venue	Partner	Opponent	Score	Result
2026	Isa Sports City, Manama, Bahrain	(Japan) Keita Nishimura	(China) Mai Jianpeng (China) Qu Zimo	17–21, 21–15, 9–21	Bronze

=== Asian Para Games ===
Men's singles WH2
Year	Venue	Opponent	Score	Result
2022	Binjiang Gymnasium; Hangzhou, China	(South Korea) Yu Soo-young	21–15, 21–9	Gold
2026	Ichinomiya City Municipal Gymnasium; Ichinomiya, Japan	(South Korea) Yu Soo-young	21–10, 18–21, 24–22	Gold

Men's doubles WH1-WH2
Year	Venue	Partner	Opponent	Score	Result
2026	Ichinomiya City Municipal Gymnasium; Ichinomiya, Japan	(Japan) Keita Nishimura	(South Korea) Park Haeseong (South Korea) Yu Soo-young	15–21, 21–12, 14–21	Bronze

=== Asian Championships ===
Men's singles WH2
Year	Venue	Opponent	Score	Result
2025	SPADT Convention Center; Nakhon Ratchasima, Thailand	(South Korea) Kim Jung-jun	21–14, 21–13	Gold

Men's doubles WH1-WH2
Year	Venue	Partner	Opponent	Score	Result
2025	SPADT Convention Center; Nakhon Ratchasima, Thailand	(Japan) Keita Nishimura	(China) Mai Jianpeng (China) Qu Zimo	17–21, 13–21	Silver

=== Asian Youth Para Games ===
Boys' singles WH2
Year	Venue	Opponent	Score	Result
2021	Alba Club, Riffa, Bahrain	(South Korea) Yu Soo-young	21–15, 21–11	Gold

=== BWF Para Badminton World Circuit (43 titles, 7 runners-up) ===
The BWF Para Badminton World Circuit – Grade 2, Level 1, 2 and 3 tournaments has been sanctioned by the Badminton World Federation from 2022.

Men's singles WH2 (31 titles)
Year	Tournament	Level	Opponent	Score	Result
2022	Spanish Para Badminton International I	Level 1	(Germany) Rick Hellmann	21–9, 21–11	(gold) Winner
2022	Brazil Para Badminton International	Level 2	(Chile) Jaime Aranguiz	21–12, 21–8	(gold) Winner
2022	Bahrain Para Badminton International	Level 2	(South Korea) Yu Soo-young	21–9, 21–6	(gold) Winner
2022	Dubai Para Badminton International	Level 2	(Hong Kong) Chan Ho Yuen	16–21, 21–5, 21–19	(gold) Winner
2022	Canada Para Badminton International	Level 1	(South Korea) Kim Jung-jun	21–12, 21–16	(gold) Winner
2022	4 Nations Para Badminton International	Level 1	(Hong Kong) Chan Ho Yuen	21–9, 11–6 retired	(gold) Winner
2022	Thailand Para Badminton International	Level 1	(South Korea) Yu Soo-young	21–10, 21–9	(gold) Winner
2023	Spanish Para Badminton International	Level 2	(South Korea) Kim Jung-jun	21–14, 21–11	(gold) Winner
2023	Spanish Para Badminton International I	Level 1	(South Korea) Kim Jung-jun	21–13, 21–7	(gold) Winner
2023	Brazil Para Badminton International	Level 2	(Hong Kong) Chan Ho Yuen	21–17, 21–10	(gold) Winner
2023	Thailand Para Badminton International	Level 2	(South Korea) Yu Soo-young	22–20, 21–13	(gold) Winner
2023	Bahrain Para Badminton International	Level 2	(Hong Kong) Chan Ho Yuen	21–14, 21–17	(gold) Winner
2023	Canada Para Badminton International	Level 1	(Hong Kong) Chan Ho Yuen	21–15, 21–1	(gold) Winner
2023	4 Nations Para Badminton International	Level 1	(South Korea) Kim Jung-jun	21–17, 19–21, 21–9	(gold) Winner
2023	Japan Para Badminton International	Level 2	(Hong Kong) Chan Ho Yuen	21–15, 21–15	(gold) Winner
2023	Dubai Para Badminton International	Level 2	(Hong Kong) Chan Ho Yuen	21–14, 21–15	(gold) Winner
2024	Spanish Para Badminton International II	Level 2	(France) Thomas Jakobs	21–6, 21–17	(gold) Winner
2024	Spanish Para Badminton International I	Level 1	(South Korea) Kim Jung-jun	21–2, 21–9	(gold) Winner
2024	4 Nations Para Badminton International	Level 1	(Hong Kong) Chan Ho Yuen	21–16, 21–12	(gold) Winner
2024	Japan Para Badminton International	Level 2	(Japan) Takumi Matsumoto	21–15, 21–12	(gold) Winner
2025	Spanish Para Badminton International II	Level 2	(Germany) Rick Hellmann	21–7, 21–11	(gold) Winner
2025	Spanish Para Badminton International I	Level 1	(Japan) Takumi Matsumoto	21–8, 21–7	(gold) Winner
2025	Thailand Para Badminton International	Level 2	(South Korea) Yu Soo-young	21–11, 21–9	(gold) Winner
2025	Peru Para Badminton International	Level 2	(Germany) Rick Hellmann	21–12, 21–8	(gold) Winner
2025	China Para Badminton International	Level 2	(South Korea) Yu Soo-young	21–11, 21–5	(gold) Winner
2025	Japan Para Badminton International	Level 2	(Germany) Rick Hellmann	21–6, 21–6	(gold) Winner
2026	Spanish Para Badminton International II	Level 2	(South Korea) Yu Soo-young	21–13, 21–8	(gold) Winner
2026	Spanish Para Badminton International I	Level 1	(South Korea) Kim Jung-jun	21–3, 21–11	(gold) Winner
2026	French Para Badminton International	Level 2	(South Korea) Yu Soo-young	21–16, 21–11	(gold) Winner
2026	British & Irish Para Badminton International	Level 2	(South Korea) Yu Soo-young	21–7, 21–4	(gold) Winner
2026	Japan Para Badminton International	Level 2	(Japan) Reo Oyama	21–9, 21–4	(gold) Winner

Men's doubles WH1–WH2 (12 titles, 7 runners-up)

Year	Tournament	Level	Partner	Opponent	Score	Result
2022	Spanish Para Badminton International I	Level 1	(Japan) Keita Nishimura	(Malaysia) Noor Azwan Noorlan (Malaysia) Muhammad Ikhwan Ramli	20–22, 21–19, 21–12	(gold) Winner
2022	Brazil Para Badminton International	Level 2	(Japan) Keita Nishimura	(France) Thomas Jakobs (France) David Toupé	21–14, 21–19	(gold) Winner
2023	Spanish Para Badminton International	Level 2	(Japan) Hiroshi Murayama	(Thailand) Jakarin Homhual (Thailand) Dumnern Junthong	21–8, 21–12	(gold) Winner
2023	Spanish Para Badminton International I	Level 1	(Japan) Hiroshi Murayama	(South Korea) Choi Jung-man (South Korea) Kim Jung-jun	18–21, 19–21	(silver) Runner-up
2023	Brazil Para Badminton International	Level 2	(Japan) Hiroshi Murayama	(India) Prem Kumar Ale (India) Abu Hubaida	21–3, 21–17	(gold) Winner
2023	Bahrain Para Badminton International	Level 2	(Japan) Hiroshi Murayama	(China) Mai Jianpeng (China) Qu Zimo	7–21, 10–21	(silver) Runner-up
2023	Canada Para Badminton International	Level 1	(Japan) Hiroshi Murayama	(South Korea) Choi Jung-man (South Korea) Kim Jung-jun	21–11, 17–21, 21–16	(gold) Winner
2023	4 Nations Para Badminton International	Level 1	(Japan) Hiroshi Murayama	(South Korea) Choi Jung-man (South Korea) Kim Jung-jun	18–21, 21–19, 16–21	(silver) Runner-up
2024	4 Nations Para Badminton International	Level 1	(Japan) Hiroshi Murayama	(South Korea) Jeong Jae-gun (South Korea) Yu Soo-young	14–21, 14–21	(silver) Runner-up
2024	Japan Para Badminton International	Level 2	(Japan) Hiroshi Murayama	(Japan) Takumi Matsumoto (Japan) Keita Nishimura	21–19, 22–20	(gold) Winner
2025	Thailand Para Badminton International	Level 2	(Japan) Keita Nishimura	(South Korea) Choi Jung-man (South Korea) Kim Jung-jun	21–23, 21–16, 21–17	(gold) Winner
2025	Peru Para Badminton International	Level 2	(Japan) Keita Nishimura	(Japan) Takumi Matsumoto (Japan) Reo Oyama	21–23, 21–16, 21–17	(gold) Winner
2025	China Para Badminton International	Level 2	(Japan) Keita Nishimura	(China) Mai Jianpeng (China) Qu Zimo	10–21, 16–21	(silver) Runner-up
2025 (Note: This tournament uses a round robin system.)	Japan Para Badminton International	Level 2	(Japan) Keita Nishimura	(Switzerland) Marc Elmer (Chinese Taipei) Yu-Yu Ong	21–9, 21–5	(gold) Winner
2025	Japan Para Badminton International	Level 2	(Japan) Keita Nishimura	(Australia) Martyn Ford (Australia) Grant Manzoney	21–6, 21–3	(gold) Winner
2025	Japan Para Badminton International	Level 2	(Japan) Keita Nishimura	(Malaysia) Jit Thye Chew (Malaysia) Ashley Irenaeus Jeck	21–9, 21–5	(gold) Winner
2025	Japan Para Badminton International	Level 2	(Japan) Keita Nishimura	(Malaysia) Noor Azwan Noorlan (Malaysia) Muhammad Ikhwan Ramli	21–8, 21–14	(gold) Winner
2026	Spanish Para Badminton International II	Level 2	(Japan) Keita Nishimura	(South Korea) Choi Jung-man (South Korea) Yu Soo-young	16–21, 13–21	(silver) Runner-up
2026	Spanish Para Badminton International I	Level 1	(Japan) Keita Nishimura	(South Korea) Choi Jung-man (South Korea) Kim Jung-jun	21–9, 21–17	(gold) Winner
2026	French Para Badminton International	Level 2	(Japan) Keita Nishimura	(South Korea) Park Haeseong (South Korea) Yu Soo-young	21–12, 21–7	(gold) Winner
2026	British & Irish Para Badminton International	Level 1	(Japan) Keita Nishimura	(South Korea) Park Haeseong (South Korea) Yu Soo-young	23–25, 21–19, 14–21	(silver) Runner-up
2026	Japan Para Badminton International	Level 2	(Japan) Keita Nishimura	(Malaysia) Noor Azwan Noorlan (Malaysia) Muhammad Ikhwan Ramli	21–15, 21–12	(gold) Winner

=== International tournaments (2011–2021) (2 titles, 4 runners-up) ===
Men's singles WH2
Year	Tournament	Opponent	Score	Result
2019	Denmark Para Badminton International	(Germany) Rick Hellmann	21–9, 21–9	(gold) Winner
2020	Peru Para Badminton International	(South Korea) Kim Jung-jun	13–21, 14–21	(silver) Runner-up

Men's doubles WH1–WH2
Year	Tournament	Partner	Opponent	Score	Result
2019	Dubai Para Badminton International	(Japan) Hiroshi Murayama	(South Korea) Jeong Jae-gun (South Korea) Kim Kyung-hoon	17–21, 7–21	(silver) Runner-up
2019	Denmark Para Badminton International	(Japan) Hiroshi Murayama	(Germany) Young-chin Mi (Germany) Thomas Wandschneider	21–12, 21–9	(gold) Winner
2020	Brazil Para Badminton International	(Japan) Hiroshi Murayama	(China) Mai Jianpeng (China) Qu Zimo	12–21, 19–21	(silver) Runner-up
2020	Peru Para Badminton International	(Japan) Hiroshi Murayama	(South Korea) Kim Jung-jun (South Korea) Lee Sam-seop	20–22, 21–15, 18–21	(silver) Runner-up
