= Abu Hubaida =

Indian para badminton player (born 1994)

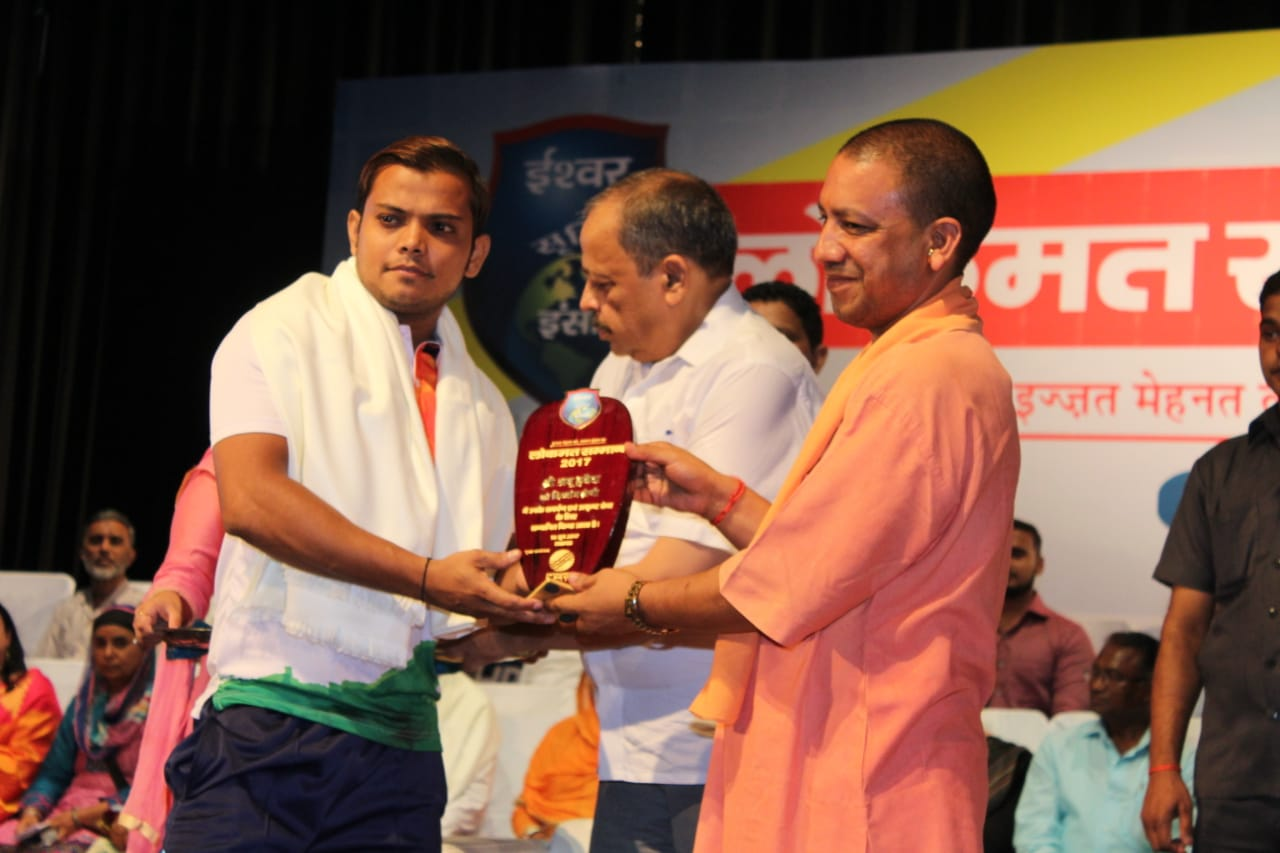
- Abu Hubaida (Left) with Uttar Pradesh Chief Minister Shri Yogi Adityanath (right)

Personal information
- Born: 10 July 1994 (age 32) Uttar Pradesh, India
- Years active: 2016-present
- Height: 5 ft 4 in (163 cm)

Sport
- Sport: Badminton
- Coached by: Gaurav Khanna

Men's singles WH2 Men's doubles WH1–WH2 Mixed doubles WH1–WH2
- Highest ranking: 13 (MS 26 April 2022); 3 (MD with Prem Kumar Ale 24 May 2022); 11 (XD with Shaimaa Samy Abdellatif 4 July 2022)
- Current ranking: 13 (MS); 09 (MD with Prem Ale Kumar) (3 September 2024)

Abu Hubaida (born 10 July 1994) is an Indian professional para badminton player. He made his international debut in 2016. He won his 1st international title for his country when he won a gold & a bronze medal in Uganda Para-Badminton International in 2017. He became national champion of men's singles in 2018 by beating former national champion Sanjeev Kumar.

He is the national champion in men's doubles with his doubles partner Prem Kumar Ale. He and his partner are also ranked 6th in men's doubles and he is ranked 16th in men's singles on the Badminton World Federation Para-Badminton World Ranking.

He received LAXMAN AWARD, which is the highest sport honor of Uttar Pradesh from Chief Minister Shri Yogi Adityanath on 24 January 2021.

== Awards ==
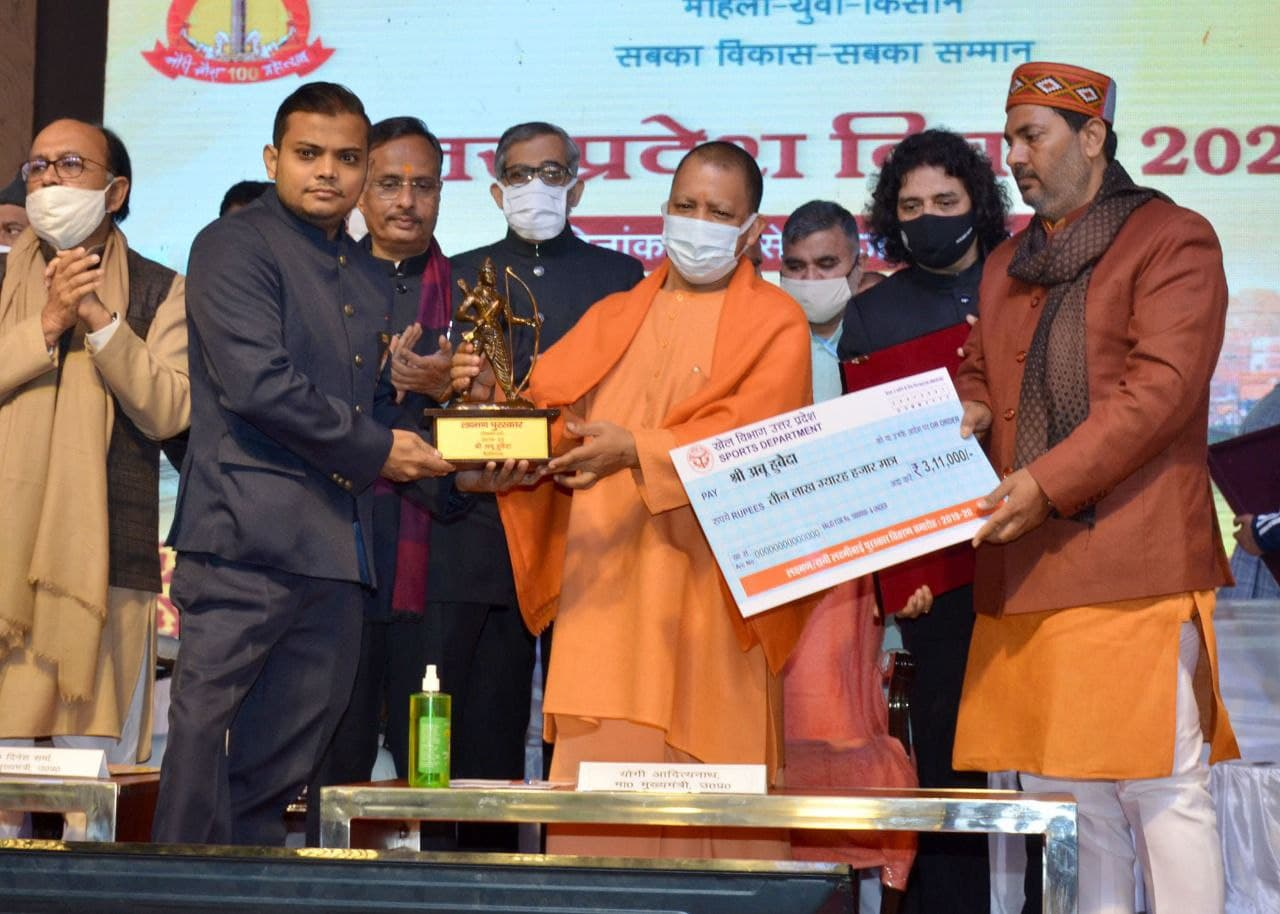
Abu Hubaida (Left) Receiving Laxman Award from Uttar Pradesh CM Shri Yogi Adityanath (Right)

- Abu Hubaida was awarded with the Laxman Award (highest Sport Honor of uttar Pradesh Government) on 24 January 2021 from Uttar Pradesh Honorable Chief Minister Shri Yogi Adityanath.
- Abu Hubaida was awarded with the Lokmat Samman on 10 June 2017 from Uttar Pradesh Honorable Chief Minister Shri Yogi Adityanath.
- Abu Hubaida was honored as the outstanding Divyang player on 3 December 2016 by the Divyangjan Empowerment Uttar Pradesh.

== Achievements ==
=== BWF Para Badminton World Circuit (1 title, 2 runners-up) ===
The BWF Para Badminton World Circuit – Grade 2, Level 1, 2 and 3 tournaments has been sanctioned by the Badminton World Federation from 2022.

Men's singles WH2
Year	Tournament	Level	Opponent	Score	Result
2024	Egypt Para Badminton International	Level 2	(India) Siddana Sahukar	21–17, 17–21, 15–21	(silver) Runner-up

Men's doubles WH1–WH2
Year	Tournament	Level	Partner	Opponent	Score	Result
2024	Egypt Para Badminton International	Level 2	(India) Prem Kumar Ale	(Spain) Ignacio Fernández (Spain) Francisco Motero	21–15, 21–18	(gold) Winner

Men's doubles WH1–WH2
Year	Tournament	Level	Partner	Opponent	Score	Result
2023	Brazil Para Badminton International	Level 2	(India) Prem Kumar Ale	(Japan) Daiki Kajiwara (Japan) Hiroshi Murayama	3–21, 17–21	(silver) Runner-up

Mixed doubles WH1–WH2

Year	Tournament	Level	Partner	Opponent	Score	Result
2022 (Note: This tournament uses a round robin system.)	4 Nations Para Badminton International	Level 1	(Finland) Heidi Manninen	(Spain) Ignacio Fernández (Austria) Henriett Koósz	13–21, 18–21	(silver) Runner-up
2022	4 Nations Para Badminton International	Level 1	(Finland) Heidi Manninen	(Spain) Francisco Motero (France) Marilou Maurel	21–9, 24–22	(silver) Runner-up
2022	4 Nations Para Badminton International	Level 1	(Finland) Heidi Manninen	(Canada) Mikhail Bilenki (Canada) Yuka Chokyu	21–11, 21–10	(silver) Runner-up

=== International tournaments (from 2011–2021) (2 titles, 5 runners-up) ===
Men's singles WH2
Year	Tournament	Opponent	Score	Result
2021	Uganda Para Badminton International	(India) Sanjeev Kumar	14–21, 21–18, 22–20	(gold) Winner

Men's doubles WH1–WH2
Year	Tournament	Partner	Opponent	Score	Result
2021	Dubai Para Badminton International	(India) Prem Kumar Ale	(France) Thomas Jakobs (France) David Toupé	13–21, 13–21	(silver) Runner-up
2021	Uganda Para Badminton International	(India) Prem Kumar Ale	(Germany) Rick Hellmann (Germany) Thomas Wandschneider	21–23, 19–21	(silver) Runner-up

Mixed doubles WH1–WH2
Year	Tournament	Partner	Opponent	Score	Result
2018	Dubai Para Badminton International	(Switzerland) Cynthia Mathez	(Spain) Roberto Galdos (Turkey) Emine Seçkin	8–21, 22–20, 14–21	(silver) Runner-up
2019	Thailand Para Badminton International	(Switzerland) Cynthia Mathez	(Israel) Amir Levi (Israel) Nina Gorodetzky	21–18, 13–21, 14–21	(silver) Runner-up
2020	Peru Para Badminton International	(Switzerland) Cynthia Mathez	(India) Prem Kumar Ale (Russia) Tatiana Gureeva	9–21, 12–21	(silver) Runner-up
2021	Uganda Para Badminton International	(Egypt) Shaimaa Samy Abdellatif	(India) Shashank Kumar (India) Ammu Mohan	21–13, 21–13	(gold) Winner
