= Mai Jianpeng =

Chinese para badminton player

Mai Jianpeng 麦建鹏
Personal information
- Born: 2 July 1989 (age 37) Guangzhou, China

Sport
- Country: China
- Sport: Badminton

Men's singles WH2 Men's doubles WH1–WH2
- Highest ranking: 7 (MS 7 January 2020); 1 (MD with Qu Zimo 29 August 2019)
- Current ranking: 23 (MS); 4 (MD with Qu Zimo) (1 November 2022)
Medal record
Representing China
Men's para-badminton
Paralympic Games
| Gold medal – first place | 2020 Tokyo | Men's doubles |
| Gold medal – first place | 2024 Paris | Men's doubles |
World Championships
| Gold medal – first place | 2019 Basel | Men's doubles |
| Gold medal – first place | 2024 Pattaya | Men's doubles |
| Gold medal – first place | 2026 Manama | Men's doubles |
| Bronze medal – third place | 2015 Stoke Mandeville | Mixed doubles |
| Bronze medal – third place | 2017 Ulsan | Mixed doubles |
| Bronze medal – third place | 2024 Pattaya | Men's singles |
Asian Para Games
| Gold medal – first place | 2018 Jakarta | Men's doubles |
| Gold medal – first place | 2022 Hangzhou | Men's doubles |
| Silver medal – second place | 2018 Jakarta | Mixed doubles |
| Bronze medal – third place | 2018 Jakarta | Men's singles' |
Asian Championships
| Silver medal – second place | 2016 Beijing | Men's singles |

Mai Jianpeng (born 2 July 1989) is a Chinese para-badminton player.

In 2021, Mai won a gold medal representing China in the men's doubles WH1–WH2 event of the 2020 Summer Paralympics.

== Achievements ==
=== Paralympic Games ===
Men's doubles WH1–WH2

| Year | Venue | Partner | Opponent | Score | Result |
|---|---|---|---|---|---|
| 2020 | Yoyogi National Gymnasium, Tokyo, Japan | (China) Qu Zimo | (South Korea) Kim Jung-jun (South Korea) Lee Dong-seop | 21–10, 21–14 | Gold |
| 2024 | Porte de La Chapelle Arena, Paris, France | (China) Qu Zimo | (South Korea) Jeong Jae-gun (South Korea) Yu Soo-young | 21-10, 21-12 | Gold |

=== World Championships ===
Men's singles WH2
| Year | Venue | Opponent | Score | Result |
|---|---|---|---|---|
| 2024 | Pattaya Exhibition and Convention Hall; Pattaya, Thailand | (Japan) Daiki Kajiwara | 13–21, 11–21 | Bronze |

Men's doubles WH1–WH2
| Year | Venue | Partner | Opponent | Score | Result |
|---|---|---|---|---|---|
| 2019 | St. Jakobshalle; Basel, Switzerland | (China) Qu Zimo | (South Korea) Kim Jung-jun (South Korea) Lee Dong-seop | 18–21, 21–18, 21–15 | Gold |
| 2024 | Pattaya Exhibition and Convention Hall, Pattaya, Thailand | (China) Qu Zimo | (Malaysia) Noor Azwan Noorlan (Malaysia) Muhammad Ikhwan Ramli | 21–10, 21–13 | Gold |

Mixed doubles WH1–WH2
| Year | Venue | Partner | Opponent | Score | Result |
|---|---|---|---|---|---|
| 2015 | Stoke Mandeville Stadium; Stoke Mandeville, England | (China) Wang Ping | (South Korea) Lee Sam-seop (South Korea) Kim Yun-sim | 11–21, 22–20, 11–21 | Bronze |
| 2017 | Dongchun Gymnasium; Ulsan, South Korea | (China) Li Hongyan | (Thailand) Jakarin Homhaul (Thailand) Amnouy Wetwithan | 19–21, 20–22 | Bronze |

=== Asian Para Games ===
Men's singles WH2
| Year | Venue | Opponent | Score | Result |
|---|---|---|---|---|
| 2018 | Istora Gelora Bung Karno; Jakarta, Indonesia | (Hong Kong) Chan Ho Yuen | 15–21, 11–21 | Bronze |

Men's doubles WH1–WH2
| Year | Venue | Partner | Opponent | Score | Result |
|---|---|---|---|---|---|
| 2018 | Istora Gelora Bung Karno, Jakarta, Indonesia | (China) Qu Zimo | (South Korea) Kim Jung-jun (South Korea) Lee Dong-seop | 21–15, 13–21, 21–17 | Gold |
| 2022 | Binjiang Gymnasium; Hangzhou, China | (China) Qu Zimo | (South Korea) Choi Jung-man (South Korea) Kim Jung-jun | 21–15, 21–16 | Gold |

Mixed doubles WH1–WH2
| Year | Venue | Partner | Opponent | Score | Result |
|---|---|---|---|---|---|
| 2018 | Istora Gelora Bung Karno, Jakarta, Indonesia | (China) Li Hongyan | (China) Qu Zimo (China) Liu Yutong | 21–14, 18–21, 18–21 | Silver |

=== Asian Championships ===
Men's singles WH2
| Year | Venue | Opponent | Score | Result |
|---|---|---|---|---|
| 2016 | China Administration of Sport for Persons With Disabilities; Beijing, China | (South Korea) Kim Jung-jun | 5–21, 12–21 | Bronze |

=== BWF Para Badminton World Circuit (2 titles, 1 runners-up) ===
The BWF Para Badminton World Circuit – Grade 2, Level 1, 2 and 3 tournaments has been sanctioned by the Badminton World Federation from 2022.

Men's doubles WH1–WH2
| Year | Tournament | Level | Partner | Opponent | Score | Result |
|---|---|---|---|---|---|---|
| 2023 | Thailand Para-Badminton International | Level 2 | (China) Qu Zimo | (South Korea) Choi Jung-man (South Korea) Kim Jung-jun | 17–21, 21–14, 17–21 | (silver) Runner-up |
| 2023 | Bahrain Para-Badminton International | Level 2 | (China) Qu Zimo | (Japan) Daiki Kajiwara (Japan) Hiroshi Murayama | 21–7, 21–10 | (gold) Winner |
| 2023 | Japan Para-Badminton International | Level 2 | (China) Qu Zimo | (Japan) Takumi Matsumoto (Japan) Keita Nishimura | 21–4, 21–15 | (gold) Winner |
| 2023 | Dubai Para-Badminton International | Level 1 | (China) Qu Zimo | (South Korea) Choi Jung-man (South Korea) Kim Jung-jun | 21–13, 21–17 | (gold) Winner |

=== International tournaments (2011–2021) (6 titles) ===
Men's doubles WH1–WH2
| Year | Tournament | Partner | Opponent | Score | Result | Ref. |
|---|---|---|---|---|---|---|
| 2019 | Turkish Para-Badminton International | (China) Qu Zimo | (South Korea) Kim Jung-jun (South Korea) Lee Sam-seop | 21–11, 18–21, 21–14 | (gold) Winner | |
| 2019 | China Para-Badminton International | (China) Qu Zimo | (China) Yang Tong (China) Zhao Xin | 21–16, 21–12 | (gold) Winner | |
| 2019 | Japan Para-Badminton International | (China) Qu Zimo | (South Korea) Kim Jung-jun (South Korea) Lee Dong-seop | 21–12, 21–13 | (gold) Winner | |
| 2020 | Brazil Para-Badminton International | (China) Qu Zimo | (Japan) Daiki Kajiwara (Japan) Hiroshi Murayama | 21–12, 21–19 | (gold) Winner | |

Mixed doubles WH1–WH2
| Year | Tournament | Partner | Opponent | Score | Result | Ref. |
|---|---|---|---|---|---|---|
| 2015 | China Para-Badminton International | (China) Wang Ping | (South Korea) Kim Jung-jun (Japan) Ikumi Fuke | 21–17, 21–12 | (gold) Winner | |
| 2019 | Turkish Para-Badminton International | (China) Yin Menglu | (China) Qu Zimo (China) Liu Yutong | 8–21, 12–21 | (silver) Runner-up | |
