= 2026 BWF Para-Badminton World Championships – Men's Doubles WH1–WH2 =

Men's Doubles WH1–WH2 at 2026 BWF Para-Badminton World Championships
Tournament details
- Dates: 8–13 February 2026
- Competitors: 50
- Venue: Isa Sports City, Manama

The men's doubles WH1–WH2 tournament at the 2026 BWF Para-Badminton World Championships took place from 8 to 13 February 2026 at Isa Sports City in Manama. A total of 25 pairs competed at the tournament.

== Classification ==
- WH1
  Players in this class are those who have impairment in both lower limbs and trunk function and require wheelchair to play
- WH2
  Players have impairment in one or both lower limbs and minimal or no impairment of the trunk and also require wheelchair

Each pair must consists of one WH1 player and one WH1 or WH2 player.

== Format ==
The 25 pairs were split into 8 groups of three to four pairs. They played a round-robin tournament with the top 2 pairs advancing to the knockout stage. Each match was played in a best-of-3.

== Seeds ==
These were the seeds for this event:

1. (Malaysia) Noor Azwan Noorlan / (Malaysia) Muhammad Ikhwan Ramli (quarter-finals)
2. (South Korea) Choi Jung-man / (South Korea) Kim Jung-jun (quarter-finals)

== Group stage ==
All times are local (UTC+3).

=== Group A ===
Pos	Team	Pld	W	L	GF	GA	GD	PF	PA	PD	Pts	Qualification
1	Noor Azwan Noorlan (MAS) Muhammad Ikhwan Ramli (MAS)	2	2	0	4	0	+4	84	23	+61	2	Knockout stage
2	Marc Elmer (SUI) Kamil Šnajdar (CZE)	2	1	1	2	3	−1	71	87	−16	1	Knockout stage
3	Mohamed Hassan Farrag (EGY) Mohamed Rashad Ahmed (EGY)	2	0	2	1	4	−3	56	101	−45	0	

Source: BWFBadminton.com

Date	Time	Player 1	Score	Player 2	Set 1	Set 2	Set 3
8 February	17:00	Noor Azwan Noorlan (Malaysia); Muhammad Ikhwan Ramli (Malaysia)	2–0	(Egypt) Mohamed Hassan Farrag (Egypt) Mohamed Rashad Ahmed	21–6	21–5	
9 February	17:30	Noor Azwan Noorlan (Malaysia); Muhammad Ikhwan Ramli (Malaysia)	2–0	(Switzerland) Marc Elmer (Czech Republic) Kamil Šnajdar	21–7	21–5	
10 February	09:15	Mohamed Hassan Farrag (Egypt); Mohamed Rashad Ahmed (Egypt)	1–2	(Switzerland) Marc Elmer (Czech Republic) Kamil Šnajdar	7–21	21–17	17–21

=== Group B ===
Pos	Team	Pld	W	L	GF	GA	GD	PF	PA	PD	Pts	Qualification
1	Choi Jung-man (KOR) Kim Jung-jun (KOR)	2	2	0	4	0	+4	84	42	+42	2	Knockout stage
2	Jakarin Homhual (THA) Kittichai Rakjaingam (THA)	2	1	1	2	2	0	75	61	+14	1	Knockout stage
3	Martyn Ford (AUS) Grant Manzoney (AUS)	2	0	2	0	4	−4	28	84	−56	0	

Source: BWFBadminton.com

Date	Time	Player 1	Score	Player 2	Set 1	Set 2	Set 3
8 February	16:30	Choi Jung-man (South Korea); Kim Jung-jun (South Korea)	2–0	(Thailand) Jakarin Homhual (Thailand) Kittichai Rakjaingam	21–16	21–17	
9 February	18:30	Choi Jung-man (South Korea); Kim Jung-jun (South Korea)	2–0	(Australia) Martyn Ford (Australia) Grant Manzoney	21–3	21–6	
10 February	09:15	Jakarin Homhual (Thailand); Kittichai Rakjaingam (Thailand)	2–0	(Australia) Martyn Ford (Australia) Grant Manzoney	21–7	21–12	

=== Group C ===
Pos	Team	Pld	W	L	GF	GA	GD	PF	PA	PD	Pts	Qualification
1	Daiki Kajiwara (JPN) Keita Nishimura (JPN)	2	2	0	4	0	+4	84	40	+44	2	Knockout stage
2	Munna Khalid (IND) Shashank Kumar (IND)	2	1	1	2	2	0	71	59	+12	1	Knockout stage
3	Dung Shiau-wei (TPE) Ong Yu-yu (TPE)	2	0	2	0	4	−4	28	84	−56	0	

Source: BWFBadminton.com

Date	Time	Player 1	Score	Player 2	Set 1	Set 2	Set 3
8 February	16:30	Daiki Kajiwara (Japan); Keita Nishimura (Japan)	2–0	(India) Munna Khalid (India) Shashank Kumar	21–15	21–14	
9 February	18:30	Daiki Kajiwara (Japan); Keita Nishimura (Japan)	2–0	(Chinese Taipei) Dung Shiau-wei (Chinese Taipei) Ong Yu-yu	21–6	21–5	
10 February	09:15	Munna Khalid (India); Shashank Kumar (India)	2–0	(Chinese Taipei) Dung Shiau-wei (Chinese Taipei) Ong Yu-yu	21–5	21–12	

=== Group D ===
Pos	Team	Pld	W	L	GF	GA	GD	PF	PA	PD	Pts	Qualification
1	Prem Kumar Ale (IND) Abu Hubaida (IND)	1	1	0	2	0	+2	42	8	+34	1	Knockout stage
2	Luděk Benada (CZE) Jan-Gerriet Janssen (GER)	1	0	1	0	2	−2	8	42	−34	0	Knockout stage
3	Johann Färrer (AUT) Daniel Kontsch (AUT) (Note: Johann Färrer / Daniel Kontsch withdrew during the tournament.)	0	0	0	0	0	0	0	0	0	0	Withdrew

Source: BWFBadminton.com
Notes:

Date	Time	Player 1	Score	Player 2	Set 1	Set 2	Set 3
8 February	17:00	Prem Kumar Ale (India); Abu Hubaida (India)	~~2–0~~	(Austria) Johann Färrer (Austria) Daniel Kontsch	~~21–2~~	~~21–3~~	
9 February	17:00	Prem Kumar Ale (India); Abu Hubaida (India)	2–0	(Czech Republic) Luděk Benada (Germany) Jan-Gerriet Janssen	21–6	21–2	
10 February	09:15	Johann Färrer (Austria); Daniel Kontsch (Austria)	Walkover	(Czech Republic) Luděk Benada (Germany) Jan-Gerriet Janssen			

=== Group E ===
Pos	Team	Pld	W	L	GF	GA	GD	PF	PA	PD	Pts	Qualification
1	Park Hae-seong (KOR) Yu Soo-young (KOR)	2	2	0	4	0	+4	84	36	+48	2	Knockout stage
2	Yuri Ferrigno (ITA) Luca Olgiati (SUI)	2	1	1	2	2	0	63	63	0	1	Knockout stage
3	Poorna Rao Chapara (IND) Manjunatha Chikkaiah (IND)	2	0	2	0	4	−4	36	84	−48	0	

Source: BWFBadminton.com

Date	Time	Player 1	Score	Player 2	Set 1	Set 2	Set 3
8 February	17:00	Park Hae-seong (South Korea); Yu Soo-young (South Korea)	2–0	(Italy) Yuri Ferrigno (Switzerland) Luca Olgiati	21–11	21–10	
9 February	17:30	Park Hae-seong (South Korea); Yu Soo-young (South Korea)	2–0	(India) Poorna Rao Chapara (India) Manjunatha Chikkaiah	21–6	21–9	
10 February	09:15	Yuri Ferrigno (Italy); Luca Olgiati (Switzerland)	2–0	(India) Poorna Rao Chapara (India) Manjunatha Chikkaiah	21–13	21–8	

=== Group F ===
Pos	Team	Pld	W	L	GF	GA	GD	PF	PA	PD	Pts	Qualification
1	Marcelo Alves Conceição (BRA) Julio Cesar Godoy (BRA)	1	1	0	2	0	+2	42	32	+10	1	Knockout stage
2	Rick Hellmann (GER) Francisco Motero (ESP)	1	0	1	0	2	−2	32	42	−10	0	Knockout stage
3	Mahdi Al-Makinah (KSA) Essam Buayti (KSA) (Note: Mahdi Al-Makinah / Essam Buayti withdrew during the tournament.)	0	0	0	0	0	0	0	0	0	0	Withdrew

Source: BWFBadminton.com
Notes:

Date	Time	Player 1	Score	Player 2	Set 1	Set 2	Set 3
8 February	16:30	Marcelo Alves Conceição (Brazil); Julio Cesar Godoy (Brazil)	2–0	(Germany) Rick Hellmann (Spain) Francisco Motero	21–17	21–15	
9 February	17:00	Marcelo Alves Conceição (Brazil); Julio Cesar Godoy (Brazil)	~~2–0~~	(Saudi Arabia) Mahdi Al-Makinah (Saudi Arabia) Essam Buayti	~~21–9~~	~~21–12~~	
10 February	09:45	Rick Hellmann (Germany); Francisco Motero (Spain)	Walkover	(Saudi Arabia) Mahdi Al-Makinah (Saudi Arabia) Essam Buayti			

=== Group G ===
Pos	Team	Pld	W	L	GF	GA	GD	PF	PA	PD	Pts	Qualification
1	Mai Jianpeng (CHN) Qu Zimo (CHN)	2	2	0	4	0	+4	84	41	+43	2	Knockout stage
2	Supriadi (INA) Agung Widodo (INA)	2	1	1	2	2	0	65	61	+4	1	Knockout stage
3	Jamal Khalifa Al-Bedwawi (UAE) Omair Muhammad (UAE)	2	0	2	0	4	−4	37	84	−47	0	

Source: BWFBadminton.com

Date	Time	Player 1	Score	Player 2	Set 1	Set 2	Set 3
8 February	16:30	Mai Jianpeng (China); Qu Zimo (China)	2–0	(United Arab Emirates) Jamal Khalifa Al-Bedwawi (United Arab Emirates) Omair Muhammad	21–8	21–10	
9 February	16:30	Mai Jianpeng (China); Qu Zimo (China)	2–0	(Indonesia) Supriadi (Indonesia) Agung Widodo	21–12	21–11	
10 February	09:45	Jamal Khalifa Al-Bedwawi (United Arab Emirates); Omair Muhammad (United Arab Emirates)	0–2	(Indonesia) Supriadi (Indonesia) Agung Widodo	11–21	8–21	

=== Group H ===
Pos	Team	Pld	W	L	GF	GA	GD	PF	PA	PD	Pts	Qualification
1	Thomas Jakobs (FRA) David Toupé (FRA)	3	3	0	6	0	+6	126	48	+78	3	Knockout stage
2	Konstantin Afinogenov (ISR) Amir Levi (ISR)	3	2	1	4	2	+2	102	59	+43	2	Knockout stage
3	David Follett (ENG) Nurul Hossain Khan (IND)	3	1	2	2	4	−2	69	119	−50	1	
4	Hayden Braun (AUS) Nang Van Nguyen (AUS)	3	0	3	0	6	−6	58	129	−71	0	

Source: BWFBadminton.com

Date	Time	Player 1	Score	Player 2	Set 1	Set 2	Set 3
8 February	17:00	Konstantin Afinogenov (Israel); Amir Levi (Israel)	2–0	(England) David Follett (India) Nurul Hossain Khan	21–3	21–5	
8 February	17:30	Thomas Jakobs (France); David Toupé (France)	2–0	(Australia) Hayden Braun (Australia) Nang Van Nguyen	21–4	21–10	
9 February	17:00	Hayden Braun (Australia); Nang Van Nguyen (Australia)	0–2	(England) David Follett (India) Nurul Hossain Khan	13–21	22–24	
9 February	18:00	Thomas Jakobs (France); David Toupé (France)	2–0	(Israel) Konstantin Afinogenov (Israel) Amir Levi	21–10	21–8	
10 February	09:45	Thomas Jakobs (France); David Toupé (France)	2–0	(England) David Follett (India) Nurul Hossain Khan	21–7	21–9	
10 February	09:45	Hayden Braun (Australia); Nang Van Nguyen (Australia)	0–2	(Israel) Konstantin Afinogenov (Israel) Amir Levi	4–21	5–21	

== Knockout stage ==
Round of 16
A1	(Malaysia) Noor Azwan Noorlan (Malaysia) Muhammad Ikhwan Ramli	21	21
H2	(Israel) Konstantin Afinogenov (Israel) Amir Levi	3	9
E1	(South Korea) Park Hae-seong (South Korea) Yu Soo-young	21	21
F2	(Germany) Rick Hellmann (Spain) Francisco Motero	14	8
D1	(India) Prem Kumar Ale (India) Abu Hubaida	16	19
E2	(Italy) Yuri Ferrigno (Switzerland) Luca Olgiati	21	21
H1	(France) Thomas Jakobs (France) David Toupé	21	21
B2	(Thailand) Jakarin Homhual (Thailand) Kittichai Rakjaingam	9	11
C2	(India) Munna Khalid (India) Shashank Kumar	21	19	16
F1	(Brazil) Marcelo Alves Conceição (Brazil) Julio Cesar Godoy	14	21	21
G2	(Indonesia) Supriadi (Indonesia) Agung Widodo	14	11
C1	(Japan) Daiki Kajiwara (Japan) Keita Nishimura	21	21
D2	(Czech Republic) Luděk Benada (Germany) Jan-Gerriet Janssen	5	2
G1	(China) Mai Jianpeng (China) Qu Zimo	21	21
A2	(Switzerland) Marc Elmer (Czech Republic) Kamil Šnajdar	11	4
B1	(South Korea) Choi Jung-man (South Korea) Kim Jung-jun	21	21

Quarter-finals
A1	(Malaysia) Noor Azwan Noorlan (Malaysia) Muhammad Ikhwan Ramli	16	24
E1	(South Korea) Park Hae-seong (South Korea) Yu Soo-young	21	26
E2	(Italy) Yuri Ferrigno (Switzerland) Luca Olgiati	11	11
H1	(France) Thomas Jakobs (France) David Toupé	21	21
F1	(Brazil) Marcelo Alves Conceição (Brazil) Julio Cesar Godoy	13	9
C1	(Japan) Daiki Kajiwara (Japan) Keita Nishimura	21	21
G1	(China) Mai Jianpeng (China) Qu Zimo	21	21
B1	(South Korea) Choi Jung-man (South Korea) Kim Jung-jun	6	14

Semi-finals
E1	(South Korea) Park Hae-seong (South Korea) Yu Soo-young	21	21
H1	(France) Thomas Jakobs (France) David Toupé	10	13
C1	(Japan) Daiki Kajiwara (Japan) Keita Nishimura	17	21	9
G1	(China) Mai Jianpeng (China) Qu Zimo	21	15	21

Final
E1	(South Korea) Park Hae-seong (South Korea) Yu Soo-young	16	17
G1	(China) Mai Jianpeng (China) Qu Zimo	21	21
