= 2026 BWF Para-Badminton World Championships – Mixed Doubles WH1–WH2 =

Mixed Doubles WH1–WH2 at 2026 BWF Para-Badminton World Championships
Tournament details
- Dates: 8–13 February 2026
- Competitors: 36
- Venue: Isa Sports City, Manama

The mixed doubles WH1–WH2 tournament at the 2026 BWF Para-Badminton World Championships took place from 8 to 13 February 2026 at Isa Sports City in Manama. A total of 18 pairs competed at the tournament.

== Classification ==
- WH1
  Players in this class are those who have impairment in both lower limbs and trunk function and require wheelchair to play
- WH2
  Players have impairment in one or both lower limbs and minimal or no impairment of the trunk and also require wheelchair

Each pair must consists of one WH1 player and one WH1 or WH2 player.

== Format ==
The 18 pairs were split into 6 groups of three to four pairs. They played a round-robin tournament with the top 2 pairs advancing to the knockout stage. Each match was played in a best-of-3.

== Seeds ==
These were the seeds for this event:

1. (Chile) Jaime Aránguiz / (Belgium) Man-Kei To (semi-finals)
2. (South Korea) Park Hae-seong / (South Korea) Jung Gyeo-ul (semi-finals)

== Group stage ==
All times are local (UTC+3).

=== Group A ===
| Pos | Team | Pld | W | L | GF | GA | GD | PF | PA | PD | Pts | Qualification |
|---|---|---|---|---|---|---|---|---|---|---|---|---|
| 1 | Jaime Aránguiz (CHL) Man-Kei To (BEL) | 2 | 2 | 0 | 4 | 0 | +4 | 84 | 29 | +55 | 2 | Quarter-finals |
| 2 | Julio Cesar Godoy (BRA) Daniele Torres Souza (BRA) | 2 | 1 | 1 | 2 | 2 | 0 | 61 | 79 | −18 | 1 | Round of 16 |
| 3 | Mohamed Rashad Ahmed (EGY) Shaimaa Samy Abdellatif (EGY) | 2 | 0 | 2 | 0 | 4 | −4 | 50 | 87 | −37 | 0 | |

Source: BWFBadminton.com

| Date | Time | Player 1 | Score | Player 2 | Set 1 | Set 2 | Set 3 |
|---|---|---|---|---|---|---|---|
| 8 February | 18:30 | Jaime Aránguiz (Chile); Man-Kei To (Belgium) | 2–0 | (Egypt) Mohamed Rashad Ahmed (Egypt) Shaimaa Samy Abdellatif | 21–10 | 21–3 | |
| 9 February | 19:00 | Jaime Aránguiz (Chile); Man-Kei To (Belgium) | 2–0 | (Brazil) Julio Cesar Godoy (Brazil) Daniele Torres Souza | 21–8 | 21–8 | |
| 10 February | 17:45 | Mohamed Rashad Ahmed (Egypt); Shaimaa Samy Abdellatif (Egypt) | 0–2 | (Brazil) Julio Cesar Godoy (Brazil) Daniele Torres Souza | 15–21 | 22–24 | |

=== Group B ===
| Pos | Team | Pld | W | L | GF | GA | GD | PF | PA | PD | Pts | Qualification |
|---|---|---|---|---|---|---|---|---|---|---|---|---|
| 1 | Park Hae-seong (KOR) Jung Gyeo-ul (KOR) | 2 | 2 | 0 | 4 | 0 | +4 | 84 | 53 | +31 | 2 | Quarter-finals |
| 2 | Kittichai Rakjaingam (THA) Onanong Phraikaeo (THA) | 2 | 1 | 1 | 2 | 2 | 0 | 75 | 66 | +9 | 1 | Round of 16 |
| 3 | David Follett (ENG) Marilou Maurel (FRA) | 2 | 0 | 2 | 0 | 4 | −4 | 44 | 84 | −40 | 0 | |

Source: BWFBadminton.com

| Date | Time | Player 1 | Score | Player 2 | Set 1 | Set 2 | Set 3 |
|---|---|---|---|---|---|---|---|
| 8 February | 18:30 | Park Hae-seong (South Korea); Jung Gyeo-ul (South Korea) | 2–0 | (Thailand) Kittichai Rakjaingam (Thailand) Onanong Phraikaeo | 21–18 | 21–15 | |
| 9 February | 19:00 | Park Hae-seong (South Korea); Jung Gyeo-ul (South Korea) | 2–0 | (England) David Follett (France) Marilou Maurel | 21–9 | 21–11 | |
| 10 February | 17:45 | Kittichai Rakjaingam (Thailand); Onanong Phraikaeo (Thailand) | 2–0 | (England) David Follett (France) Marilou Maurel | 21–9 | 21–15 | |

=== Group C ===
| Pos | Team | Pld | W | L | GF | GA | GD | PF | PA | PD | Pts | Qualification |
|---|---|---|---|---|---|---|---|---|---|---|---|---|
| 1 | Qu Zimo (CHN) Liu Yutong (CHN) | 2 | 2 | 0 | 4 | 0 | +4 | 84 | 26 | +58 | 2 | Quarter-finals |
| 2 | Shashank Kumar (IND) Ammu Mohan (IND) | 2 | 1 | 1 | 2 | 2 | 0 | 56 | 69 | −13 | 1 | Round of 16 |
| 3 | Grant Manzoney (AUS) Macka Mackenzie (AUS) | 2 | 0 | 2 | 0 | 4 | −4 | 39 | 84 | −45 | 0 | |

Source: BWFBadminton.com

| Date | Time | Player 1 | Score | Player 2 | Set 1 | Set 2 | Set 3 |
|---|---|---|---|---|---|---|---|
| 8 February | 19:30 | Qu Zimo (China); Liu Yutong (China) | 2–0 | (Australia) Grant Manzoney (Australia) Macka Mackenzie | 21–5 | 21–7 | |
| 9 February | 19:30 | Qu Zimo (China); Liu Yutong (China) | 2–0 | (India) Shashank Kumar (India) Ammu Mohan | 21–7 | 21–7 | |
| 10 February | 17:45 | Grant Manzoney (Australia); Macka Mackenzie (Australia) | 0–2 | (India) Shashank Kumar (India) Ammu Mohan | 8–21 | 19–21 | |

=== Group D ===
| Pos | Team | Pld | W | L | GF | GA | GD | PF | PA | PD | Pts | Qualification |
|---|---|---|---|---|---|---|---|---|---|---|---|---|
| 1 | Prem Kumar Ale (IND) Alphia James (IND) | 1 | 1 | 0 | 2 | 0 | +2 | 42 | 29 | +13 | 1 | Quarter-finals |
| 2 | Ong Yu-yu (TPE) Yang I-chen (TPE) | 1 | 0 | 1 | 0 | 2 | −2 | 29 | 42 | −13 | 0 | Round of 16 |
| 3 | Marcelo Alves Conceição (BRA) Mischa Ginns (AUS) (Note: Marcelo Alves Conceição / Mischa Ginns withdrew during the tournament.) | 0 | 0 | 0 | 0 | 0 | 0 | 0 | 0 | 0 | 0 | Withdrew |

Source: BWFBadminton.com
Notes:

| Date | Time | Player 1 | Score | Player 2 | Set 1 | Set 2 | Set 3 |
|---|---|---|---|---|---|---|---|
| 8 February | 19:30 | Prem Kumar Ale (India); Alphia James (India) | 2–0 | (Chinese Taipei) Ong Yu-yu (Chinese Taipei) Yang I-chen | 21–19 | 21–10 | |
| 9 February | 19:30 | Prem Kumar Ale (India); Alphia James (India) | ~~2–0~~ | (Brazil) Marcelo Alves Conceição (Australia) Mischa Ginns | ~~21–16~~ | ~~21–12~~ | |
| 10 February | 17:45 | Ong Yu-yu (Chinese Taipei); Yang I-chen (Chinese Taipei) | Walkover | (Brazil) Marcelo Alves Conceição (Australia) Mischa Ginns | | | |

=== Group E ===
| Pos | Team | Pld | W | L | GF | GA | GD | PF | PA | PD | Pts | Qualification |
|---|---|---|---|---|---|---|---|---|---|---|---|---|
| 1 | Zhao Xin (CHN) Yin Menglu (CHN) | 2 | 2 | 0 | 4 | 0 | +4 | 84 | 39 | +45 | 2 | Round of 16 |
| 2 | Francisco Motero (ESP) Maya Alcaide (ESP) | 2 | 1 | 1 | 2 | 2 | 0 | 65 | 64 | +1 | 1 | Round of 16 |
| 3 | Qambar Ali Akhteyari (AUS) Bree Wright (AUS) | 2 | 0 | 2 | 0 | 4 | −4 | 38 | 84 | −46 | 0 | |

Source: BWFBadminton.com

| Date | Time | Player 1 | Score | Player 2 | Set 1 | Set 2 | Set 3 |
|---|---|---|---|---|---|---|---|
| 8 February | 19:00 | Francisco Motero (Spain); Maya Alcaide (Spain) | 2–0 | (Australia) Qambar Ali Akhteyari (Australia) Bree Wright | 21–10 | 21–12 | |
| 9 February | 19:30 | Francisco Motero (Spain); Maya Alcaide (Spain) | 0–2 | (China) Zhao Xin (China) Yin Menglu | 10–21 | 13–21 | |
| 10 February | 18:15 | Qambar Ali Akhteyari (Australia); Bree Wright (Australia) | 0–2 | (China) Zhao Xin (China) Yin Menglu | 9–21 | 7–21 | |

=== Group F ===
| Pos | Team | Pld | W | L | GF | GA | GD | PF | PA | PD | Pts | Qualification |
|---|---|---|---|---|---|---|---|---|---|---|---|---|
| 1 | Kamil Šnajdar (CZE) Annika Schröder (GER) | 2 | 1 | 1 | 2 | 2 | 0 | 71 | 64 | +7 | 1 | Round of 16 |
| 2 | Andrzej Kawa (POL) Natalia Grzyb (POL) | 2 | 0 | 2 | 0 | 4 | −4 | 42 | 84 | −42 | 0 | Round of 16 |
| 3 | Abu Hubaida (IND) Pallavi Kaluvehalli M. (IND) | 2 | 2 | 0 | 4 | 0 | +4 | 84 | 49 | +35 | 2 | |

Source: BWFBadminton.com

| Date | Time | Player 1 | Score | Player 2 | Set 1 | Set 2 | Set 3 |
|---|---|---|---|---|---|---|---|
| 8 February | 17:00 | Kamil Šnajdar (Czech Republic); Annika Schröder (Germany) | 2–0 | (Poland) Andrzej Kawa (Poland) Natalia Grzyb | 21–16 | 21–6 | |
| 9 February | 19:30 | Kamil Šnajdar (Czech Republic); Annika Schröder (Germany) | 0–2 | (India) Abu Hubaida (India) Pallavi Kaluvehalli M. | 13–21 | 16–21 | |
| 10 February | 18:15 | Andrzej Kawa (Poland); Natalia Grzyb (Poland) | 0–2 | (India) Abu Hubaida (India) Pallavi Kaluvehalli M. | 16–21 | 4–21 | |

== Knockout stage ==
Round of 16
C2 | (India) Shashank Kumar (India) Ammu Mohan | 14 | 12
B2 | (Thailand) Kittichai Rakjaingam (Thailand) Onanong Phraikaeo | 21 | 21
F1 | (India) Abu Hubaida (India) Pallavi Kaluvehalli M. | 22 | 21
A2 | (Brazil) Julio Cesar Godoy (Brazil) Daniele Torres Souza | 20 | 18
D2 | (Chinese Taipei) Ong Yu-yu (Chinese Taipei) Yang I-chen | 8 | 10
E1 | (China) Zhao Xin (China) Yin Menglu | 21 | 21
E2 | (Spain) Francisco Motero (Spain) Maya Alcaide | 21 | 19 | 14
F2 | (Czech Republic) Kamil Šnajdar (Germany) Annika Schröder | 8 | 21 | 21

Quarter-finals
A1 | (Chile) Jaime Aránguiz (Belgium) Man-Kei To | 21 | 21
B2 | (Thailand) Kittichai Rakjaingam (Thailand) Onanong Phraikaeo | 19 | 18
D1 | (India) Prem Kumar Ale (India) Alphia James | 21 | 21
F1 | (India) Abu Hubaida (India) Pallavi Kaluvehalli M. | 14 | 17
E1 | (China) Zhao Xin (China) Yin Menglu | 9 | 16
C1 | (China) Qu Zimo (China) Liu Yutong | 21 | 21
F2 | (Czech Republic) Kamil Šnajdar (Germany) Annika Schröder | 7 | 8
B1 | (South Korea) Park Hae-seong (South Korea) Jung Gyeo-ul | 21 | 21

Semi-finals
A1 | (Chile) Jaime Aránguiz (Belgium) Man-Kei To | 14 | 15
D1 | (India) Prem Kumar Ale (India) Alphia James | 21 | 21
C1 | (China) Qu Zimo (China) Liu Yutong | 21 | 21
B1 | (South Korea) Park Hae-seong (South Korea) Jung Gyeo-ul | 3 | 7

Final
D1 | (India) Prem Kumar Ale (India) Alphia James | 6 | 4
C1 | (China) Qu Zimo (China) Liu Yutong | 21 | 21
