= Yang Tong (para-badminton) =

Chinese para-badminton player

Yang Tong 杨通
Personal information
- Born: 13 August 2000 (age 26) Handan, Hebei, China

Sport
- Country: China
- Sport: Badminton
- Handedness: Right

Men's singles WH1 Men's doubles WH1–WH2 Mixed doubles WH1–WH2
- Highest ranking: 7 (MS 25 February 2020); 7 (MD with Zhao Xin 16 April 2024); 1 (XD with Li Hongyan 1 November 2022)
- Current ranking: 8 (MS); 13 (MD with Zhao Xin); 6 (XD with Li Hongyan) (25 September 2024)
- BWF profile
Medal record
Men's para-badminton
Representing China
World Championships
Gold medal – first place	2019 Basel	Mixed doubles
Silver medal – second place	2024 Pattaya	Mixed doubles
Bronze medal – third place	2019 Basel	Men's singles
Bronze medal – third place	2024 Pattaya	Men's singles
Asian Para Games
Silver medal – second place	2022 Hangzhou	Mixed doubles
Bronze medal – third place	2022 Hangzhou	Men's singles
Bronze medal – third place	2022 Hangzhou	Men's doubles
Asian Youth Para Games
Bronze medal – third place	2017 Dubai	Men's singles

Yang Tong (Chinese: 杨通; pinyin: Yáng Tōng; born 13 August 2000) is a Chinese para-badminton player. He won a gold medal in the mixed doubles WH1–WH2 event at the 2019 BWF Para-Badminton World Championships with his partner Li Hongyan. He made his Paralympic debut at the 2024 Summer Paralympics in Paris, where he competed in the men's singles WH1 before losing in the quarter-finals.

== Achievements ==
=== World Championships ===
Men's singles WH1
Year	Venue	Opponent	Score	Result
2019	St. Jakobshalle; Basel, Switzerland	(South Korea) Lee Dong-seop	21–18, 8–21, 16–21	Bronze
2024	Pattaya Exhibition and Convention Hall; Pattaya, Thailand	(South Korea) Choi Jung-man	14–21, 16–21	Bronze

Mixed doubles WH1–WH2
Year	Venue	Partner	Opponent	Score	Result
2019	St. Jakobshalle; Basel, Switzerland	(China) Li Hongyan	(Thailand) Jakarin Homhual (Thailand) Amnouy Wetwithan	21–15, 19–21, 21–16	Gold
2024	Pattaya Exhibition and Convention Hall; Pattaya, Thailand	(China) Li Hongyan	(China) Qu Zimo (China) Liu Yutong	12–21, 12–21	Silver

=== Asian Para Games ===
Men's singles WH1
Year	Venue	Opponent	Score	Result
2022	Binjiang Gymnasium; Hangzhou, China	(South Korea) Choi Jung-man	10–21, 18–21	Bronze

Men's doubles WH1–WH2
Year	Venue	Partner	Opponent	Score	Result
2022	Binjiang Gymnasium; Hangzhou, China	(China) Zhao Xin	(South Korea) Choi Jung-man (South Korea) Kim Jung-jun	13–21, 10–21	Bronze

Mixed doubles WH1–WH2
Year	Venue	Partner	Opponent	Score	Result
2022	Binjiang Gymnasium; Hangzhou, China	(China) Li Hongyan	(China) Qu Zimo (China) Liu Yutong	7–21, 12–21	Silver

=== Asian Youth Para Games ===
Men's singles WH1

Year	Venue	Opponent	Score	Result
2017	Al Wasl Club, Dubai, United Arab Emirates	(China) Qu Zimo	9–21, 5–21	Bronze

=== BWF Para Badminton World Circuit (1 runner-up) ===
The BWF Para Badminton World Circuit – Grade 2, Level 1, 2 and 3 tournaments has been sanctioned by the Badminton World Federation from 2022.

Men's singles WH1
Year	Tournament	Level	Opponent	Score	Result
2023	Dubai Para-Badminton International	Level 1	(China) Qu Zimo	11–21, 7–21	(silver) Runner-up

=== International tournaments (2011–2021) (1 title, 3 runners-up) ===
Men's singles WH1
Year	Tournament	Opponent	Score	Result
2019	China Para-Badminton International	(China) Qu Zimo	5–21, 11–21	(silver) Runner-up

Men's doubles WH1–WH2
Year	Tournament	Partner	Opponent	Score	Result
2019	China Para-Badminton International	(China) Zhao Xin	(China) Mai Jianpeng (China) Qu Zimo	12–21, 16–21	(silver) Runner-up

Mixed doubles WH1–WH2

Year	Tournament	Partner	Opponent	Score	Result
2019 (Note: This tournament uses a round robin system.)	China Para-Badminton International	(China) Li Hongyan	(Germany) Rick Hellmann (Germany) Valeska Knoblauch	21–15, 21–9	(silver) Runner-up
2019	China Para-Badminton International	(China) Li Hongyan	(China) Zhao Xin (China) Zhang Jing	21–12, 21–11	(silver) Runner-up
2019	China Para-Badminton International	(China) Li Hongyan	(China) Qu Zimo (China) Liu Yutong	15–21, 11–21	(silver) Runner-up
2019	China Para-Badminton International	(China) Li Hongyan	(Chinese Taipei) Chan Kun-yi (Belgium) To Man-kei	21–5, 21–7	(silver) Runner-up
2020	Brazil Para-Badminton International	(China) Li Hongyan	(India) Prem Kumar Ale (Russia) Tatiana Gureeva	21–15, 21–10	(gold) Winner
