= 2019 BWF Para-Badminton World Championships – Men's singles WH1 =

Men's singles WH1 at the 2019 BWF Para-Badminton World Championships
- Venue: St. Jakobshalle
- Location: Basel, Switzerland
- Dates: 20–25 August

Medalists
gold medal	Qu Zimao	China
silver medal	Lee Dong-seop	South Korea
bronze medal	Tong Yang	China
bronze medal	Choi Jung-man	South Korea

The men's singles WH1 tournament of the 2019 BWF Para-Badminton World Championships took place from 20 to 25 August.

== Seeds ==
1. (Germany) Thomas Wandschneider (first round)
2. (South Korea) Choi Jung-man (semi-finals)
3. (China) Qu Zimao (world champion)
4. (South Korea) Lee Dong-seop (final)
5. (France) David Toupé (first round)
6. (Germany) Young-chin Mi (quarter-finals)
7. (Japan) Hiroshi Murayama (first round)
8. (Japan) Osamu Nagashima (first round)

== Group stage ==
All times are local (UTC+2).

=== Group A ===
Pos	Team	Pld	W	L	GF	GA	GD	PF	PA	PD	Pts	Qualification
1	(Germany) Thomas Wandschneider [1]	2	2	0	4	0	+4	84	34	+50	2	Advance to Knock-out stage
2	(Brazil) Marcelo Alves Conceição	2	1	1	2	2	0	67	49	+18	1	Advance to Knock-out stage
3	(Republic of Ireland) Chris Stewart	2	0	2	0	4	−4	16	84	−68	0	

Source: TS

Date		Score		Set 1	Set 2	Set 3
20 Aug; 10:30	Thomas Wandschneider (Germany)	2–0	(Brazil) Marcelo Alves Conceição	21–14	21–11	
21 Aug; 10:00	Chris Stewart (Republic of Ireland)	0–2	(Brazil) Marcelo Alves Conceição	3–21	4–21	
22 Aug; 10:00	Thomas Wandschneider (Germany)	2–0	(Republic of Ireland) Chris Stewart	21–5	21–4	

=== Group B ===
Pos	Team	Pld	W	L	GF	GA	GD	PF	PA	PD	Pts	Qualification
1	(South Korea) Choi Jung-man [2]	3	3	0	6	0	+6	126	51	+75	3	Advance to Knock-out stage
2	(Japan) Mamoru Oe	3	2	1	4	3	+1	117	104	+13	2	Advance to Knock-out stage
3	(Vietnam) Hoàng Mạnh Giang	3	1	2	3	4	−1	101	113	−12	1	
4	(Canada) Richard Peter	3	0	3	0	6	−6	50	126	−76	0	

Source: TS

Date		Score		Set 1	Set 2	Set 3
20 Aug; 10:00	Mamoru Oe (Japan)	2–1	(Vietnam) Hoàng Mạnh Giang	12–21	21–7	21–11
20 Aug; 10:00	Choi Jung-man (South Korea)	2–0	(Canada) Richard Peter	21–3	21–7	
21 Aug; 10:00	Choi Jung-man (South Korea)	2–0	(Vietnam) Hoàng Mạnh Giang	21–11	21–9	
21 Aug; 10:00	Mamoru Oe (Japan)	2–0	(Canada) Richard Peter	21–14	21–9	
22 Aug; 10:00	Choi Jung-man (South Korea)	2–0	(Japan) Mamoru Oe	21–14	21–7	
22 Aug; 10:30	Hoàng Mạnh Giang (Vietnam)	2–0	(Canada) Richard Peter	21–9	21–8	

=== Group C ===
Pos	Team	Pld	W	L	GF	GA	GD	PF	PA	PD	Pts	Qualification
1	(China) Qu Zimao [3/4]	3	3	0	6	0	+6	126	47	+79	3	Advance to Knock-out stage
2	(Thailand) Homhual Jakarin	3	2	1	4	2	+2	108	65	+43	2	Advance to Knock-out stage
3	(France) Stephen Durand	3	1	2	2	4	−2	73	95	−22	1	
4	(Australia) Duke Trench-Thiedeman	3	0	3	0	6	−6	26	126	−100	0	

Source: TS

Date		Score		Set 1	Set 2	Set 3
20 Aug; 10:30	Stephen Durand (France)	0–2	(Thailand) Homhual Jakarin	9–21	6–21	
20 Aug; 10:30	Qu Zimao (China)	2–0	(Australia) Duke Trench-Thiedeman	21–4	21–3	
21 Aug; 10:30	Qu Zimao (China)	2–0	(Australia) Duke Trench-Thiedeman	21–14	21–10	
21 Aug; 10:30	Stephen Durand (France)	2–0	(Thailand) Homhual Jakarin	21–7	21–4	
22 Aug; 10:30	Qu Zimao (China)	2–0	(France) Stephen Durand	21–13	21–3	
22 Aug; 10:30	Homhual Jakarin (Thailand)	2–0	(Australia) Duke Trench-Thiedeman	21–5	21–3	

=== Group D ===
Pos	Team	Pld	W	L	GF	GA	GD	PF	PA	PD	Pts	Qualification
1	(South Korea) Lee Dong-seop [3/4]	3	3	0	6	0	+6	126	42	+84	3	Advance to Knock-out stage
2	(England) David Follett	3	2	1	4	2	+2	99	86	+13	2	Advance to Knock-out stage
3	(Finland) Markus Lehto	3	1	2	2	4	−2	79	98	−19	1	
4	(Egypt) Atef Abdelkarim Mahmoud	3	0	3	0	6	−6	48	126	−78	0	

Source: TS

Date		Score		Set 1	Set 2	Set 3
20 Aug; 11:30	David Follett (England)	2–0	(Finland) Markus Lehto	21–12	21–8	
20 Aug; 11:00	Lee Dong-seop (South Korea)	2–0	(Egypt) Atef Abdelkarim Mahmoud	21–5	21–5	
21 Aug; 10:30	Lee Dong-seop (South Korea)	2–0	(Finland) Markus Lehto	21–8	21–9	
21 Aug; 11:00	David Follett (England)	2–0	(Egypt) Atef Abdelkarim Mahmoud	21–11	21–13	
22 Aug; 11:00	Lee Dong-seop (South Korea)	2–0	(England) David Follett	21–5	21–10	
22 Aug; 11:00	Markus Lehto (Finland)	2–0	(Egypt) Atef Abdelkarim Mahmoud	21–4	21–10	

=== Group E ===
Pos	Team	Pld	W	L	GF	GA	GD	PF	PA	PD	Pts	Qualification
1	(France) David Toupé [5/8]	3	3	0	6	0	+6	126	53	+73	3	Advance to Knock-out stage
2	(Malaysia) Muhammad Ikhwan Ramli	3	2	1	4	2	+2	116	75	+41	2	Advance to Knock-out stage
3	(Spain) Francisco Motero	3	1	2	2	4	−2	67	98	−31	1	
4	(Canada) Mikhail Bilenki	3	0	3	0	6	−6	43	126	−83	0	

Source: TS

Date		Score		Set 1	Set 2	Set 3
20 Aug; 11:00	Muhammad Ikhwan Ramli (Malaysia)	2–0	(Spain) Francisco Motero	21–10	21–7	
20 Aug; 11:00	David Toupé (France)	2–0	(Canada) Mikhail Bilenki	21–6	21–7	
21 Aug; 11:00	David Toupé (France)	2–0	(Spain) Francisco Motero	21–4	21–4	
21 Aug; 11:00	Muhammad Ikhwan Ramli (Malaysia)	2–0	(Canada) Mikhail Bilenki	21–7	21–9	
22 Aug; 11:00	David Toupé (France)	2–0	(Malaysia) Muhammad Ikhwan Ramli	21–7	21–7	
22 Aug; 11:30	Francisco Motero (Spain)	2–0	(Canada) Mikhail Bilenki	21–14	21–18	

=== Group F ===
Pos	Team	Pld	W	L	GF	GA	GD	PF	PA	PD	Pts	Qualification
1	(Japan) Osamu Nagashima [5/8]	3	3	0	6	0	+6	126	60	+66	3	Advance to Knock-out stage
2	(Finland) Timo Villanen	3	2	1	4	2	+2	101	91	+10	2	Advance to Knock-out stage
3	(Russia) Yuri Stepanov	3	1	2	2	4	−2	98	115	−17	1	
4	(Turkey) Avni Kertmen	3	0	3	0	6	−6	67	126	−59	0	

Source: TS

Date		Score		Set 1	Set 2	Set 3
20 Aug; 11:30	Yuri Stepanov (Russia)	2–0	(Turkey) Avni Kertmen	21–15	21–16	
20 Aug; 11:30	Osamu Nagashima (Japan)	2–0	(Finland) Timo Villanen	21–10	21–7	
21 Aug; 11:00	Osamu Nagashima (Japan)	2–0	(Turkey) Avni Kertmen	21–7	21–11	
21 Aug; 11:30	Yuri Stepanov (Russia)	0–2	(Finland) Timo Villanen	16–21	15–21	
22 Aug; 11:30	Osamu Nagashima (Japan)	2–0	(Russia) Yuri Stepanov	21–11	21–14	
22 Aug; 11:30	Avni Kertmen (Turkey)	0–2	(Finland) Timo Villanen	8–21	10–21	

=== Group G ===
Pos	Team	Pld	W	L	GF	GA	GD	PF	PA	PD	Pts	Qualification
1	(China) Tong Yang	3	3	0	6	0	+6	126	73	+53	3	Advance to Knock-out stage
2	(Japan) Hiroshi Murayama [5/8]	3	2	1	4	2	+2	115	85	+30	2	Advance to Knock-out stage
3	(Russia) Konstantin Afinogenov	3	1	2	2	4	−2	89	132	−43	1	
4	(Thailand) Kornpeekanok Chatchai	3	0	3	0	6	−6	99	139	−40	0	

Source: TS

Date		Score		Set 1	Set 2	Set 3
20 Aug; 11:30	Kornpeekanok Chatchai (Thailand)	0–2	(China) Tong Yang	19–21	15–21	
20 Aug; 12:00	Hiroshi Murayama (Japan)	2–0	(Russia) Konstantin Afinogenov	21–18	21–8	
21 Aug; 11:30	Hiroshi Murayama (Japan)	0–2	(China) Tong Yang	15–21	16–21	
21 Aug; 11:30	Kornpeekanok Chatchai (Thailand)	1–2	(Russia) Konstantin Afinogenov	18–21	21–13	9–21
22 Aug; 11:30	Tong Yang (China)	2–0	(Russia) Konstantin Afinogenov	21–3	21–5	
22 Aug; 12:00	Hiroshi Murayama (Japan)	2–0	(Thailand) Kornpeekanok Chatchai	21–8	21–9	

=== Group H ===
Pos	Team	Pld	W	L	GF	GA	GD	PF	PA	PD	Pts	Qualification
1	(Germany) Young-chin Mi [5/8]	3	3	0	6	0	+6	126	59	+67	3	Advance to Knock-out stage
2	(India) Prem Kumar Ale	3	2	1	4	2	+2	110	71	+39	2	Advance to Knock-out stage
3	(Italy) Yuri Ferrigno	3	1	2	2	4	−2	77	108	−31	1	
4	(England) Owen Kilburn	3	0	3	0	6	−6	51	126	−75	0	

Source: TS

Date		Score		Set 1	Set 2	Set 3
20 Aug; 12:00	Owen Kilburn (England)	0–2	(India) Prem Kumar Ale	8–21	6–21	
20 Aug; 12:00	Young-chin Mi (Germany)	2–0	(Italy) Yuri Ferrigno	21–12	21–8	
21 Aug; 12:00	Young-chin Mi (Germany)	2–0	(India) Prem Kumar Ale	21–17	21–9	
21 Aug; 12:00	Owen Kilburn (England)	0–2	(Italy) Yuri Ferrigno	8–21	16–21	
22 Aug; 12:00	Young-chin Mi (Germany)	2–0	(England) Owen Kilburn	21–5	21–8	
22 Aug; 12:00	Prem Kumar Ale (India)	2–0	(Italy) Yuri Ferrigno	21–11	21–4	

== Knock-out stage ==
First Round
1	(Germany) Thomas Wandschneider	21	15	18
(India) Prem Kumar Ale	18	21	21
(China) Tong Yang	21	21
(Finland) Timo Villanen	7	15
3/4	(South Korea) Lee Dong-seop	18	21	21
5/8	(Japan) Hiroshi Murayama	21	15	17
5/8	(Germany) Young-chin Mi	21	21
(Brazil) Marcelo Alves Conceição	16	15
(Malaysia) Muhammad Ikhwan Ramli	10	21	21
5/8	(Japan) Osamu Nagashima	21	16	12
(Japan) Mamoru Oe	8	10
3/4	(China) Qu Zimao	21	21
(Thailand) Homhual Jakarin	21	21
5/8	(France) David Toupé	16	17
(England) David Follett	7	8
2	(South Korea) Choi Jung-man	21	21

Quarter-finals
(India) Prem Kumar Ale	13	10
(China) Tong Yang	21	21
3/4	(South Korea) Lee Dong-seop	21	21
5/8	(Germany) Young-chin Mi	10	12
(Malaysia) Muhammad Ikhwan Ramli	12	12
3/4	(China) Qu Zimao	21	21
(Thailand) Homhual Jakarin	9	11
2	(South Korea) Choi Jung-man	21	21

Semi-finals
(China) Tong Yang	21	8	16
3/4	(South Korea) Lee Dong-seop	18	21	21
3/4	(China) Qu Zimao	21	21
2	(South Korea) Choi Jung-man	15	17

Final
3/4	(South Korea) Lee Dong-seop	16	13
3/4	(China) Qu Zimao	21	21
