= Qu Zimo =

Chinese para badminton player

Qu Zimo 屈子墨
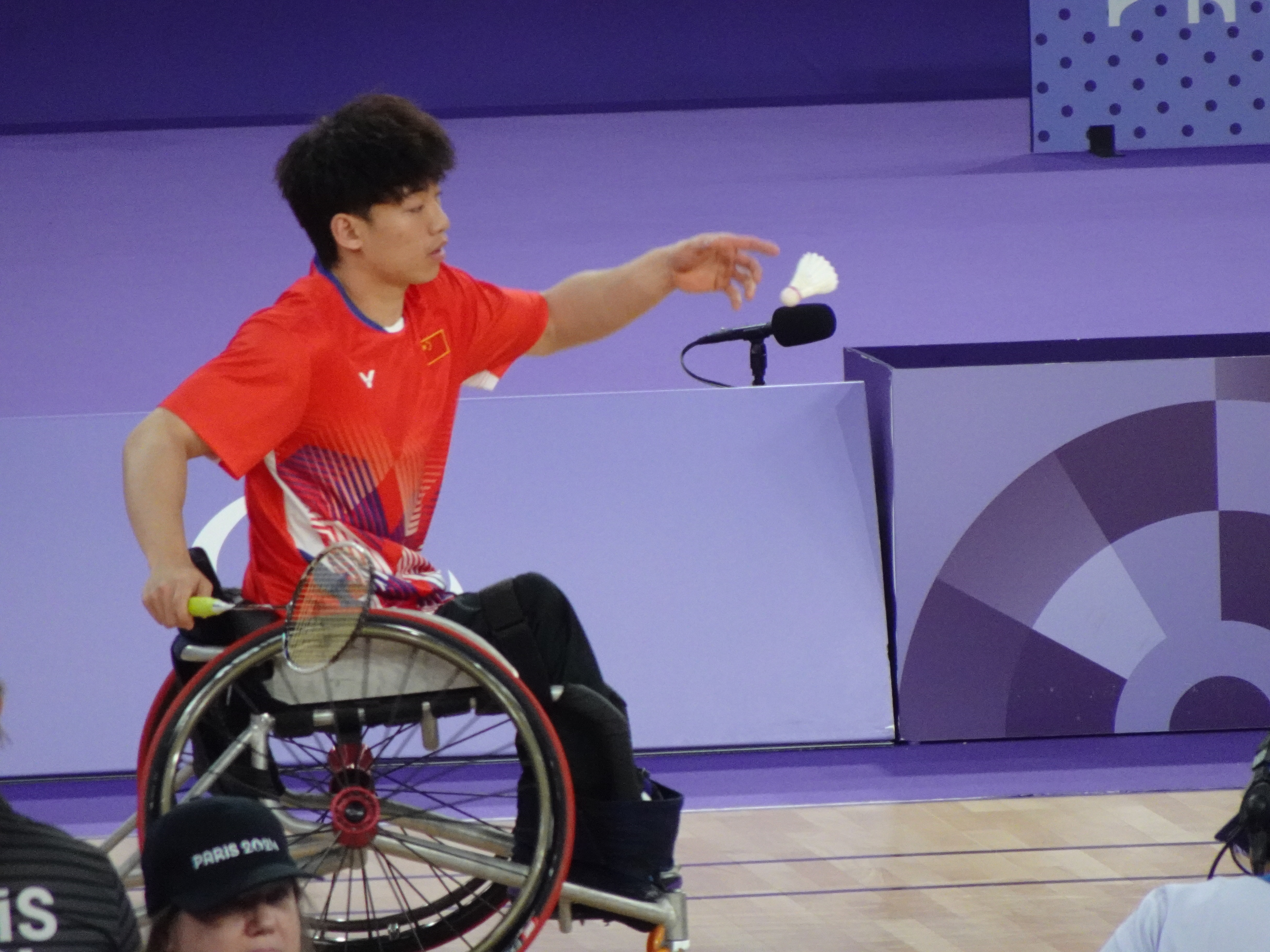
- Qu at the 2024 Summer Paralympics

Personal information
- Born: 22 September 2001 (age 25) Shijiazhuang, China

Sport
- Country: China
- Sport: Badminton

Men's singles WH1 Men's doubles WH1–WH2 Mixed doubles WH1–WH2
- Highest ranking: 1 (MS 3 October 2019); 1 (MD with Mai Jianpeng 29 August 2019); 2 (XD with Liu Yutong 8 November 2022)
- Current ranking: 2 (MS); 1 (MD with Mai Jianpeng); 3 (XD with Liu Yutong) (3 September 2024)
- BWF profile
Medal record
Men's para-badminton
Representing China
Paralympic Games
Gold medal – first place	2024 Paris	Men's singles
Gold medal – first place	2024 Paris	Men's doubles
Gold medal – first place	2020 Tokyo	Men's singles
Gold medal – first place	2020 Tokyo	Men's doubles
World Championships
Gold medal – first place	2019 Basel	Men's singles
Gold medal – first place	2019 Basel	Men's doubles
Gold medal – first place	2024 Pattaya	Men's singles
Gold medal – first place	2024 Pattaya	Men's doubles
Gold medal – first place	2024 Pattaya	Mixed doubles
Gold medal – first place	2026 Manama	Men's singles
Gold medal – first place	2026 Manama	Men's doubles
Gold medal – first place	2026 Manama	Mixed doubles
Silver medal – second place	2017 Ulsan	Men's singles
Asian Para Games
Gold medal – first place	2018 Jakarta	Men's doubles
Gold medal – first place	2018 Jakarta	Mixed doubles
Gold medal – first place	2022 Hangzhou	Men's singles
Gold medal – first place	2022 Hangzhou	Men's doubles
Gold medal – first place	2022 Hangzhou	Mixed doubles
Silver medal – second place	2018 Jakarta	Men's singles
Asian Championships
Bronze medal – third place	2016 Beijing	Men's singles
Asian Youth Para Games
Gold medal – first place	2017 Dubai	Men's singles

Qu Zimo (born 22 September 2001) is a Chinese wheelchair badminton player. He won two gold medals in para-badminton at the 2020 Summer Paralympics in men's singles WH1 and men's doubles WH1–WH2 respectively.

== Personal life ==
Qu was born in Shijiazhuang in Hebei, China. At three months old, Qu was diagnosed with polio and was paralyzed in his lower limbs. He was later drafted into the Hebei disabled badminton team where he began to learn and practice wheelchair badminton.

== Achievements ==
=== Paralympic Games ===
Men's singles WH1

Year	Venue	Opponent	Score	Result
2020	Yoyogi National Gymnasium, Tokyo, Japan	(South Korea) Lee Sam-seop	21–6, 11–6^{r}	Gold
2024	Porte de La Chapelle Arena, Paris, France	(South Korea) Choi Jung-man	21–3, 21–7	Gold

Men's doubles WH1–WH2

Year	Venue	Partner	Opponent	Score	Result
2020	Yoyogi National Gymnasium, Tokyo, Japan	(China) Mai Jianpeng	(South Korea) Kim Jung-jun (South Korea) Lee Dong-seop	21–10, 21–14	Gold
2024	Porte de La Chapelle Arena, Paris, France	(China) Mai Jianpeng	(South Korea) Jeong Jae-gun (South Korea) Yu Soo-young	21–10, 21–12	Gold

=== World Championships ===
Men's singles WH1
Year	Venue	Opponent	Score	Result
2017	Dongchun Gymnasium, Ulsan, South Korea	(South Korea) Lee Sam-seop	10–21, 9–21	Silver
2019	St. Jakobshalle; Basel, Switzerland	(South Korea) Lee Dong-seop	21–16, 21–13	Gold
2024	Pattaya Exhibition and Convention Hall; Pattaya, Thailand	(South Korea) Choi Jung-man	21–18, 19–21, 21–15	Gold
2026	Isa Sports City, Manama, Bahrain	(Japan) Keita Nishimura	21–9, 21–13	Gold

Men's doubles WH1–WH2
Year	Venue	Partner	Opponent	Score	Result
2019	St. Jakobshalle, Basel, Switzerland	(China) Mai Jianpeng	(South Korea) Kim Jung-jun (South Korea) Lee Dong-seop	18–21, 21–18, 21–15	Gold
2024	Pattaya Exhibition and Convention Hall, Pattaya, Thailand	(China) Mai Jianpeng	(Malaysia) Noor Azwan Noorlan (Malaysia) Muhammad Ikhwan Ramli	21–10, 21–13	Gold
2026	Isa Sports City, Manama, Bahrain	(China) Mai Jianpeng	(South Korea) Park Hae-seong (South Korea) Yu Soo-young	21–16, 21–17	Gold

Mixed doubles WH1–WH2
Year	Venue	Partner	Opponent	Score	Result
2024	Pattaya Exhibition and Convention Hall, Pattaya, Thailand	(China) Liu Yutong	(China) Yang Tong (China) Li Hongyan	21–12, 21–12	Gold
2026	Isa Sports City, Manama, Bahrain	(China) Liu Yutong	(India) Prem Kumar Ale (India) Alphia James	21–6, 21–4	Gold

=== Asian Para Games ===
Men's singles WH1
Year	Venue	Opponent	Score	Result
2018	Istora Gelora Bung Karno; Jakarta, Indonesia	(South Korea) Choi Jung-man	21–15, 18–21, 12–21	Silver
2022	Binjiang Gymnasium; Hangzhou, China	(South Korea) Choi Jung-man	21–5, 21–10	Gold

Men's doubles WH1–WH2
Year	Venue	Partner	Opponent	Score	Result
2018	Istora Gelora Bung Karno, Jakarta, Indonesia	(China) Mai Jianpeng	(South Korea) Kim Jung-jun (South Korea) Lee Dong-seop	21–15, 13–21, 21–17	Gold
2022	Binjiang Gymnasium, Hangzhou, China	(China) Mai Jianpeng	(South Korea) Choi Jung-man (South Korea) Kim Jung-jun	21–15, 21–16	Gold

Mixed doubles WH1–WH2
Year	Venue	Partner	Opponent	Score	Result
2018	Istora Gelora Bung Karno, Jakarta, Indonesia	(China) Liu Yutong	(China) Mai Jianpeng (China) Li Hongyan	14–21, 21–18, 21–18	Gold
2022	Binjiang Gymnasium, Hangzhou, China	(China) Liu Yutong	(China) Yang Tong (China) Li Hongyan	21–7, 21–12	Gold

=== Asian Championships ===
Men's singles WH1
Year	Venue	Opponent	Score	Result
2016	China Administration of Sport for Persons with Disabilities; Beijing, China	(South Korea) Lee Dong-seop	20–22, 20–22	Bronze

=== Asian Youth Para Games ===
Men's singles WH1

Year	Venue	Opponent	Score	Result
2017	Al Wasl Club, Dubai, United Arab Emirates	(China) Zhao Xin	20–22, 21–12, 21–14	Gold

=== BWF Para Badminton World Circuit (7 titles, 1 runner-up) ===
The BWF Para Badminton World Circuit – Grade 2, Level 1, 2 and 3 tournaments has been sanctioned by the Badminton World Federation from 2022.

Men's singles WH1
Year	Tournament	Level	Opponent	Score	Result
2023	Thailand Para-Badminton International	Level 2	(South Korea) Choi Jung-man	12–21, 21–8, 21–19	(gold) Winner
2023	Bahrain Para-Badminton International	Level 2	(South Korea) Choi Jung-man	21–15, 21–13	(gold) Winner
2023	Japan Para-Badminton International	Level 2	(Malaysia) Muhammad Ikhwan Ramli	21–9, 21–9	(gold) Winner
2023	Dubai Para-Badminton International	Level 1	(China) Yang Tong	21–11, 21–7	(gold) Winner

Men's doubles WH1–WH2
Year	Tournament	Level	Partner	Opponent	Score	Result
2023	Thailand Para-Badminton International	Level 2	(China) Mai Jianpeng	(South Korea) Choi Jung-man (South Korea) Kim Jung-jun	17–21, 21–14, 17–21	(silver) Runner-up
2023	Bahrain Para-Badminton International	Level 2	(China) Mai Jianpeng	(Japan) Daiki Kajiwara (Japan) Hiroshi Murayama	21–7, 21–10	(gold) Winner
2023	Japan Para-Badminton International	Level 2	(China) Mai Jianpeng	(Japan) Takumi Matsumoto (Japan) Keita Nishimura	21–4, 21–15	(gold) Winner
2023	Dubai Para-Badminton International	Level 1	(China) Mai Jianpeng	(South Korea) Choi Jung-man (South Korea) Kim Jung-jun	21–13, 21–17	(gold) Winner

=== International tournaments (2011–2021) (11 titles) ===
Men's singles WH1
Year	Tournament	Opponent	Score	Result
2019	Turkish Para-Badminton International	(South Korea) Choi Jung-man	21–8, 21–14	(gold) Winner
2019	Dubai Para-Badminton International	(South Korea) Choi Jung-man	21–19, 21–14	(gold) Winner
2019	China Para-Badminton International	(China) Yang Tong	21–5, 21–11	(gold) Winner
2019	Japan Para-Badminton International	(South Korea) Choi Jung-man	21–10, 21–16	(gold) Winner

Men's doubles WH1–WH2
Year	Tournament	Partner	Opponent	Score	Result
2019	Turkish Para-Badminton International	(China) Mai Jianpeng	(South Korea) Kim Jung-jun (South Korea) Lee Sam-seop	21–11, 18–21, 21–14	(gold) Winner
2019	China Para-Badminton International	(China) Mai Jianpeng	(China) Yang Tong (China) Zhao Xin	21–16, 21–12	(gold) Winner
2019	Japan Para-Badminton International	(China) Mai Jianpeng	(South Korea) Kim Jung-jun (South Korea) Lee Dong-seop	21–12, 21–13	(gold) Winner
2020	Brazil Para-Badminton International	(China) Mai Jianpeng	(Japan) Daiki Kajiwara (Japan) Hiroshi Murayama	21–12, 21–19	(gold) Winner

Mixed doubles WH1–WH2

Year	Tournament	Partner	Opponent	Score	Result
2019	Turkish Para-Badminton International	(China) Liu Yutong	(China) Mai Jianpeng (China) Yin Menglu	21–8, 21–12	(gold) Winner
2019	Dubai Para-Badminton International	(China) Liu Yutong	(Switzerland) Luca Olgiati (Switzerland) Karin Suter-Erath	21–5, 21–10	(gold) Winner
2019 (Note: This tournament uses a round robin system.)	China Para-Badminton International	(China) Liu Yutong	(China) Zhao Xin (China) Zhang Jing	21–11, 21–12	(gold) Winner
2019	China Para-Badminton International	(China) Liu Yutong	(Chinese Taipei) Chan Kun-yi (Belgium) To Man-kei	21–8, 21–5	(gold) Winner
2019	China Para-Badminton International	(China) Liu Yutong	(China) Yang Tong (China) Li Hongyan	21–15, 21–11	(gold) Winner
2019	China Para-Badminton International	(China) Liu Yutong	(Germany) Rick Cornell Hellmann (Germany) Valeska Knoblauch	21–10, 21–9	(gold) Winner
