= Badminton at the 2024 Summer Paralympics – Men's singles WH1 =

Badminton competition

Men's singles WH1 at the XVII Paralympic Games
- Venue: Arena Porte de La Chapelle, Paris
- Dates: 29 August 2024 – 2 September 2024
- Competitors: 9 from 6 nations

Medalists
1st place, gold medalist(s)		Qu Zimo	China
2nd place, silver medalist(s)		Choi Jung-man	South Korea
3rd place, bronze medalist(s)		Thomas Wandschneider	Germany

The men's singles WH1 tournament at the 2024 Summer Paralympics in France will take place between 29 August and 2 September 2024 at Arena Porte de La Chapelle. 9 players participated. The event was won by the defending champion, Qu Zimo from China, beating the number one seed, Choi Jung-man of South Korea in the final.

== Classification ==
- WH1
  Players in this class are those who have impairment in both lower limbs and trunk function and require wheelchair to play

== Seeds ==
These were the seeds for this event:

1. Choi Jung-man (KOR) (final, silver medalist)
2. Thomas Wandschneider (GER) (semifinals, bronze medalist)
3. Muhammad Ikhwan Ramli (MAS) (group stage)

== Group stage ==
The draw of the group stage revealed on 24 August 2024. The group stage will be played from 29 to 31 August. The top two winners of each group advanced to the knockout rounds.

=== Group A ===
Pos	Team	Pld	W	L	GF	GA	GD	PF	PA	PD	Pts	Qualification
1	Choi Jung-man (KOR)	2	2	0	4	0	+4	84	48	+36	2	Semi-finals
2	Hiroshi Murayama (JPN)	2	1	1	2	2	0	65	67	−2	1	Quarter-finals
3	Osamu Nagashima (JPN)	2	0	2	0	4	−4	50	84	−34	0	

Updated to match(es) played on 30 August 2024. Source: COJOP2024

Date	Time	Player 1	Score	Player 2	Set 1	Set 2	Set 3	Report
Aug 29	19:37	Hiroshi Murayama (Japan)	2–0	(Japan) Osamu Nagashima	21–8	21–17		Report
Aug 30	17:56	Choi Jung-man (South Korea)	2–0	(Japan) Osamu Nagashima	21–11	21–14		Report
Aug 31	12:48	Choi Jung-man (South Korea)	2–0	(Japan) Hiroshi Murayama	21–10	21–13		Report

=== Group B ===
Pos	Team	Pld	W	L	GF	GA	GD	PF	PA	PD	Pts	Qualification
1	Qu Zimo (CHN)	2	2	0	4	0	+4	84	36	+48	2	Quarter-finals
2	Jeong Jae-gun (KOR)	2	1	1	2	3	−1	88	99	−11	1	Quarter-finals
3	Muhammad Ikhwan Ramli (MAS)	2	0	2	1	4	−3	68	105	−37	0	

Updated to match(es) played on 30 August 2024. Source: COJOP2024

Date	Time	Player 1	Score	Player 2	Set 1	Set 2	Set 3	Report
Aug 29	20:18	Jeong Jae-gun (South Korea)	0–2	(China) Qu Zimo	14–21	11–21		Report
Aug 30	18:55	Muhammad Ikhwan Ramli (Malaysia)	1–2	(South Korea) Jeong Jae-gun	23–25	21–17	13–21	Report
Aug 31	13:29	Muhammad Ikhwan Ramli (Malaysia)	0–2	(China) Qu Zimo	7–21	4–21		Report

=== Group C ===
Pos	Team	Pld	W	L	GF	GA	GD	PF	PA	PD	Pts	Qualification
1	Thomas Wandschneider (GER)	2	2	0	4	1	+3	99	88	+11	2	Semi-finals
2	Yang Tong (CHN)	2	1	1	3	2	+1	101	83	+18	1	Quarter-finals
3	David Toupé (FRA) (H)	2	0	2	0	4	−4	55	84	−29	0	

Updated to match(es) played on 30 August 2024. Source: COJOP2024
(H) Host

Date	Time	Player 1	Score	Player 2	Set 1	Set 2	Set 3	Report
Aug 29	21:04	David Toupé (France)	0–2	(China) Yang Tong	14–21	12–21		Report
Aug 30	18:40	Thomas Wandschneider (Germany)	2–0	(France) David Toupé	21–12	21–17		Report
Aug 31	13:48	Thomas Wandschneider (Germany)	2–1	(China) Yang Tong	24–22	12–21	21–16	Report

== Finals ==
The knockout stage will be played from 1 to 2 September.

Quarter-finals
A2	Hiroshi Murayama (JPN)	26	19	-
B2	Jeong Jae-gun (KOR)	28	21	-
C2	Yang Tong (CHN)	9	8	-
B1	Qu Zimo (CHN)	21	21	-

Semi-finals
A1	Choi Jung-man (KOR)	21	21	-
B2	Jeong Jae-gun (KOR)	10	17	-
B1	Qu Zimo (CHN)	21	21	-
C1	Thomas Wandschneider (GER)	1	10	-

Gold medal match
A1	Choi Jung-man (KOR) (silver)	3	7	-
B1	Qu Zimo (CHN) (gold)	21	21	-
Bronze medal match
B2	Jeong Jae-gun (KOR)	24	11	-
C1	Thomas Wandschneider (GER) (bronze)	26	21	-
