= 2026 BWF Para-Badminton World Championships – Men's Singles WH1 =

Men's Singles WH1 at 2026 BWF Para-Badminton World Championships
Tournament details
- Dates: 8–13 February 2026
- Competitors: 32 from 22 nations
- Venue: Isa Sports City, Manama

The men's singles WH1 tournament at the 2026 BWF Para-Badminton World Championships took place from 8 to 13 February 2026 at Isa Sports City in Manama. A total of 32 players from 22 nations competed at the tournament.

== Classification ==
- WH1
  Players in this class are those who have impairment in both lower limbs and trunk function and require wheelchair to play

== Format ==
The 32 players were split into 8 groups of four players. They played a round-robin tournament with the top 2 players advancing to the knockout stage. Each match was played in a best-of-3.

== Seeds ==
These were the seeds for this event:

1. (Malaysia) Muhammad Ikhwan Ramli (semi-finals)
2. (South Korea) Choi Jung-man (semi-finals)

== Group stage ==
=== Group A ===
Pos	Team	Pld	W	L	GF	GA	GD	PF	PA	PD	Pts	Qualification
1	Muhammad Ikhwan Ramli (MAS)	3	3	0	6	0	+6	126	63	+63	3	Knockout stage
2	Francisco Motero (ESP)	3	2	1	4	2	+2	109	67	+42	2	Knockout stage
3	Mikhail Bilenki (CAN)	3	1	2	2	5	−3	92	142	−50	1	
4	Martyn Ford (AUS)	3	0	3	1	6	−5	85	140	−55	0	

Source: BWFBadminton.com

Date	Time	Player 1	Score	Player 2	Set 1	Set 2	Set 3
8 February	11:00	Mikhail Bilenki (Canada)	0–2	(Spain) Francisco Motero	6–21	7–21	
8 February	11:30	Muhammad Ikhwan Ramli (Canada)	2–0	(Australia) Martyn Ford	21–5	21–10	
9 February	09:00	Muhammad Ikhwan Ramli (Malaysia)	2–0	(Canada) Mikhail Bilenki	21–10	21–13	
9 February	09:00	Francisco Motero (Spain)	2–0	(Australia) Martyn Ford	21–1	21–11	
9 February	14:00	Muhammad Ikhwan Ramli (Malaysia)	2–0	(Spain) Francisco Motero	21–12	21–13	
9 February	14:00	Mikhail Bilenki (Canada)	2–1	(Australia) Martyn Ford	21–19	14–21	21–18

=== Group B ===
Pos	Team	Pld	W	L	GF	GA	GD	PF	PA	PD	Pts	Qualification
1	Choi Jung-man (KOR)	3	3	0	6	0	+6	126	71	+55	3	Knockout stage
2	Hiroto Iizuka (JPN)	3	2	1	4	3	+1	133	115	+18	2	Knockout stage
3	Arthur Terencio Dias (BRA)	3	1	2	2	4	−2	90	98	−8	1	
4	Agung Widodo (INA)	3	0	3	1	6	−5	79	144	−65	0	

Source: BWFBadminton.com

Date	Time	Player 1	Score	Player 2	Set 1	Set 2	Set 3
8 February	11:30	Choi Jung-man (South Korea)	2–0	(Indonesia) Agung Widodo	21–5	21–12	
8 February	11:30	Arthur Terencio Dias (Brazil)	0–2	(Japan) Hiroto Iizuka	16–21	9–21	
9 February	09:00	Choi Jung-man (South Korea)	2–0	(Brazil) Arthur Terencio Dias	21–11	21–12	
9 February	09:00	Hiroto Iizuka (Japan)	2–1	(Indonesia) Agung Widodo	21–12	18–21	21–15
9 February	14:00	Choi Jung-man (South Korea)	2–0	(Japan) Hiroto Iizuka	21–13	21–18	
9 February	14:00	Arthur Terencio Dias (Brazil)	2–0	(Indonesia) Agung Widodo	21–6	21–8	

=== Group C ===
Pos	Team	Pld	W	L	GF	GA	GD	PF	PA	PD	Pts	Qualification
1	Keita Nishimura (JPN)	3	3	0	6	0	+6	129	55	+74	3	Knockout stage
2	Prem Kumar Ale (IND)	3	2	1	4	2	+2	115	92	+23	2	Knockout stage
3	Chew Jit Thye (MAS)	3	1	2	2	4	−2	85	100	−15	1	
4	Jamal Khalifa Al Bedwawi (UAE)	3	0	3	0	6	−6	44	126	−82	0	

Source: BWFBadminton.com

Date	Time	Player 1	Score	Player 2	Set 1	Set 2	Set 3
8 February	11:30	Chew Jit Thye (Malaysia)	0–2	(India) Prem Kumar Ale	18–21	10–21	
8 February	12:00	Keita Nishimura (Japan)	2–0	(United Arab Emirates) Jamal Khalifa Al Bedwawi	21–2	21–7	
9 February	09:00	Keita Nishimura (Japan)	2–0	(Malaysia) Chew Jit Thye	21–7	21–8	
9 February	09:30	Prem Kumar Ale (India)	2–0	(United Arab Emirates) Jamal Khalifa Al Bedwawi	21–12	21–7	
9 February	14:30	Keita Nishimura (Japan)	2–0	(India) Prem Kumar Ale	21–9	24–22	
9 February	15:30	Chew Jit Thye (Malaysia)	2–0	(United Arab Emirates) Jamal Khalifa Al Bedwawi	21–8	21–8	

=== Group D ===
Pos	Team	Pld	W	L	GF	GA	GD	PF	PA	PD	Pts	Qualification
1	Yuri Ferrigno (ITA)	3	3	0	6	1	+5	140	88	+52	3	Knockout stage
2	Ong Yu-yu (TPE)	3	2	1	5	2	+3	133	103	+30	2	Knockout stage
3	Mohamed Rashad Ahmed (EGY)	3	1	2	2	4	−2	93	104	−11	1	
4	Johann Färrer (AUT)	3	0	3	0	6	−6	55	126	−71	0	

Source: BWFBadminton.com

Date	Time	Player 1	Score	Player 2	Set 1	Set 2	Set 3
8 February	12:00	Yuri Ferrigno (Italy)	2–0	(Austria) Johann Färrer	21–14	21–1	
8 February	12:00	Ong Yu-yu (Chinese Taipei)	2–0	(Egypt) Mohamed Rashad Ahmed	21–11	21–16	
9 February	09:30	Yuri Ferrigno (Italy)	2–1	(Chinese Taipei) Ong Yu-yu	14–21	21–12	21–16
9 February	09:30	Mohamed Rashad Ahmed (Egypt)	2–0	(Austria) Johann Färrer	21–7	21–13	
9 February	14:30	Ong Yu-yu (Chinese Taipei)	2–0	(Austria) Johann Färrer	21–10	21–10	
9 February	15:30	Yuri Ferrigno (Italy)	2–0	(Egypt) Mohamed Rashad Ahmed	21–11	21–13	

=== Group E ===
Pos	Team	Pld	W	L	GF	GA	GD	PF	PA	PD	Pts	Qualification
1	Shashank Kumar (IND)	3	3	0	6	0	+6	126	46	+80	3	Knockout stage
2	Konstantin Afinogenov (ISR)	3	2	1	4	2	+2	105	72	+33	2	Knockout stage
3	David Follett (ENG)	3	1	2	2	4	−2	68	106	−38	1	
4	Andrzej Kawa (POL)	3	0	3	0	6	−6	51	126	−75	0	

Source: BWFBadminton.com

Date	Time	Player 1	Score	Player 2	Set 1	Set 2	Set 3
8 February	12:00	Konstantin Afinogenov (Israel)	2–0	(Poland) Andrzej Kawa	21–9	21–8	
8 February	12:00	David Follett (England)	0–2	(India) Shashank Kumar	9–21	4–21	
9 February	09:30	Konstantin Afinogenov (Israel)	2–0	(England) David Follett	21–7	21–6	
9 February	10:00	Shashank Kumar (India)	2–0	(Poland) Andrzej Kawa	21–8	21–4	
9 February	15:00	Konstantin Afinogenov (Israel)	0–2	(India) Shashank Kumar	8–21	13–21	
9 February	15:00	David Follett (England)	2–0	(Poland) Andrzej Kawa	21–12	21–10	

=== Group F ===
Pos	Team	Pld	W	L	GF	GA	GD	PF	PA	PD	Pts	Qualification
1	Marcelo Alves Conceição (BRA)	3	3	0	6	0	+6	126	51	+75	3	Knockout stage
2	Omair Muhammad (UAE)	3	2	1	4	2	+2	108	85	+23	2	Knockout stage
3	Essam Buayti (KSA)	3	1	2	2	4	−2	79	117	−38	1	
4	Luděk Benada (CZE)	3	0	3	0	6	−6	68	128	−60	0	

Source: BWFBadminton.com

Date	Time	Player 1	Score	Player 2	Set 1	Set 2	Set 3
8 February	12:30	Marcelo Alves Conceição (Brazil)	2–0	(Czech Republic) Luděk Benada	21–7	21–5	
8 February	12:30	Essam Buayti (Saudi Arabia)	0–2	(United Arab Emirates) Omair Muhammad	10–21	10–21	
9 February	10:00	Marcelo Alves Conceição (Brazil)	2–0	(Saudi Arabia) Essam Buayti	21–10	21–5	
9 February	10:00	Omair Muhammad (United Arab Emirates)	2–0	(Czech Republic) Luděk Benada	21–9	21–14	
9 February	15:00	Marcelo Alves Conceição (Brazil)	2–0	(United Arab Emirates) Omair Muhammad	21–10	21–14	
9 February	15:00	Essam Buayti (Saudi Arabia)	2–0	(Czech Republic) Luděk Benada	21–12	23–21	

=== Group G ===
Pos	Team	Pld	W	L	GF	GA	GD	PF	PA	PD	Pts	Qualification
1	Park Hae-seong (KOR)	3	3	0	6	0	+6	126	41	+85	3	Knockout stage
2	Tarek Abbas Gharib Zahry (EGY)	3	1	2	3	4	−1	107	134	−27	1	Knockout stage
3	Poorna Rao Chapara (IND)	3	1	2	3	5	−2	131	155	−24	1	
4	Kamil Šnajdar (CZE)	3	1	2	2	5	−3	107	141	−34	1	

Source: BWFBadminton.com

Date	Time	Player 1	Score	Player 2	Set 1	Set 2	Set 3
8 February	12:30	Park Hae-seong (South Korea)	2–0	(Czech Republic) Kamil Šnajdar	21–5	21–6	
8 February	12:30	Poorna Rao Chapara (India)	2–1	(Egypt) Tarek Abbas Gharib Zahry	16–21	21–12	21–18
9 February	10:00	Park Hae-seong (South Korea)	2–0	(India) Poorna Rao Chapara	21–7	21–11	
9 February	10:00	Tarek Abbas Gharib Zahry (Egypt)	2–0	(Czech Republic) Kamil Šnajdar	23–21	21–13	
9 February	15:00	Park Hae-seong (South Korea)	2–0	(Egypt) Tarek Abbas Gharib Zahry	21–7	21–5	
9 February	15:30	Poorna Rao Chapara (India)	1–2	(Czech Republic) Kamil Šnajdar	19–21	22–20	14–21

=== Group H ===
Pos	Team	Pld	W	L	GF	GA	GD	PF	PA	PD	Pts	Qualification
1	Qu Zimo (CHN)	3	3	0	6	0	+6	126	42	+84	3	Knockout stage
2	David Toupé (FRA)	3	2	1	4	3	+1	115	108	+7	2	Knockout stage
3	Anuwat Sriboran (THA)	3	1	2	3	4	−1	106	122	−16	1	
4	Nang Van Nguyen (AUS)	3	0	3	0	6	−6	51	126	−75	0	

Source: BWFBadminton.com

Date	Time	Player 1	Score	Player 2	Set 1	Set 2	Set 3
8 February	10:30	Nang Van Nguyen (Australia)	0–2	(France) David Toupé	3–21	12–21	
8 February	13:00	Qu Zimo (China)	2–0	(Thailand) Anuwat Sriboran	21–6	21–7	
9 February	10:30	Qu Zimo (China)	2–0	(Australia) Nang Van Nguyen	21–5	21–7	
9 February	10:30	David Toupé (France)	2–1	(Thailand) Anuwat Sriboran	14–21	21–14	21–16
9 February	14:30	Qu Zimo (China)	2–0	(France) David Toupé	21–9	21–8	
9 February	14:30	Nang Van Nguyen (Australia)	0–2	(Thailand) Anuwat Sriboran	13–21	11–21	

== Knockout stage ==
Round of 16
A1	(Malaysia) Muhammad Ikhwan Ramli	21	21
F2	(United Arab Emirates) Omair Muhammad	9	7
F1	(Brazil) Marcelo Alves Conceição	19	21	21
D2	(Chinese Taipei) Ong Yu-yu	21	12	4
D1	(Italy) Yuri Ferrigno	5	8
B2	(Japan) Hiroto Iizuka	21	21
H1	(China) Qu Zimo	21	21
A2	(Spain) Francisco Motero	8	10
C2	(India) Prem Kumar Ale	8	15
E1	(India) Shashank Kumar	21	21
H2	(France) David Toupé	9	9
C1	(Japan) Keita Nishimura	21	21
E2	(Israel) Konstantin Afinogenov	7	12
G1	(South Korea) Park Hae-seong	21	21
G2	(Egypt) Tarek Abbas Gharib Zahry	5	11
B1	(South Korea) Choi Jung-man	21	21

Quarter-finals
A1	(Malaysia) Muhammad Ikhwan Ramli	21	21
F1	(Brazil) Marcelo Alves Conceição	10	14
B2	(Japan) Hiroto Iizuka	14	18
H1	(China) Qu Zimo	21	21
E1	(India) Shashank Kumar	11	7
C1	(Japan) Keita Nishimura	21	21
G1	(South Korea) Park Hae-seong	8	15
B1	(South Korea) Choi Jung-man	21	21

Semi-finals
A1	(Malaysia) Muhammad Ikhwan Ramli	9	10
H1	(China) Qu Zimo	21	21
C1	(Japan) Keita Nishimura	21	11	21
B1	(South Korea) Choi Jung-man	19	21	18

Final
H1	(China) Qu Zimo	21	21
C1	(Japan) Keita Nishimura	9	13
