= Takumi Matsumoto =

Japanese para-badminton player

Takumi Matsumoto 松本 卓巳
Personal information
- Born: 22 March 1994 (age 32) Sakura, Chiba Prefecture, Japan

Sport
- Country: Japan
- Sport: Badminton
- Handedness: Right

Men's singles WH2 Men's doubles WH1–WH2
- Highest ranking: 5 (MS 21 June 2022); 4 (MD with Hiroshi Murayama, 8 November 2022)
- Current ranking: 7 (MS); 8 (MD with Keita Nishimura) (24 September 2024)

Takumi Matsumoto (松本 卓巳, Matsumoto Takumi; born 22 March 1994) is a Japanese para-badminton player. He reached the final four of the men's doubles WH1–WH2 event at the 2024 Summer Paralympics but lost his chances of winning a Paralympic medal when he lost in the bronze medal match.

== Biography ==
In 2017, Matsumoto suffered a spinal cord injury in an accident at work. He was introduced to para-badminton while in rehabilitation and initially played the sport as a hobby. He eventually went professional and began competing in international tournaments as well as qualifying for his maiden appearance at the Paralympic Games.

== Achievements ==
=== BWF Para Badminton World Circuit (3 titles, 3 runners-up) ===
The BWF Para Badminton World Circuit – Grade 2, Level 1, 2 and 3 tournaments has been sanctioned by the Badminton World Federation from 2022.

Men's singles WH2
Year	Tournament	Level	Opponent	Score	Result
2022	Uganda Para-Badminton International	Level 3	(India) Munna Khalid	21–15, 21–13	(gold) Winner
2022	Peru Para-Badminton International	Level 2	(Chile) Jaime Aránguiz	21–13, 21–12	(gold) Winner

Men's doubles WH1–WH2
Year	Tournament	Level	Partner	Opponent	Score	Result
2022	Uganda Para-Badminton International	Level 3	(Japan) Keita Nishimura	(India) Munna Khalid (India) Shashank Kumar	17–21, 17–21	(silver) Runner-up
2022	Peru Para-Badminton International	Level 2	(Japan) Keita Nishimura	Konstantin Afinogenov; Amir Levi	21–19, 21–11	(gold) Winner
2023	Japan Para-Badminton International	Level 2	(Japan) Keita Nishimura	(China) Mai Jianpeng (China) Qu Zimo	4–21, 15–21	(silver) Runner-up
2023	Spanish Para-Badminton International II	Level 2	(Japan) Keita Nishimura	(South Korea) Choi Jung-man (South Korea) Kim Jung-jun	20–22, 19–21	(silver) Runner-up
