= Badminton at the 2022 Asian Para Games – Men's singles WH1 =

Badminton championships

Badminton's men's singles WH1 at the 2022 Asian Para Games
- Venue: Binjiang Gymnasium, Hangzhou
- Dates: 20 – 26 August 2023
- Competitors: 19 from 11 nations

Medalists
| gold medal | Qu Zimo | China |
| silver medal | Choi Jung-man | South Korea |
| bronze medal | Yang Tong | China |
| bronze medal | Muhammad Ikhwan Ramli | Malaysia |

The men's singles WH1 badminton tournament at the 2022 Asian Para Games is playing from 20 to 26 October 2023 in Binjiang Gymnasium, Hangzhou. A total of 19 players competed at the tournament, six of whom was seeded.

== Competition schedule ==
Plays are taking place between 20 and 26 October 2023.

| GS | Group stage | R16 | Round of 16 | ¼ | Quarterfinals | ½ | Semifinals | F | Final |

| Events | Fri 20 | Sat 21 | Sun 22 | Mon 23 | Tue 24 | | Wed 25 | Thu 26 | Fri 27 |
|---|---|---|---|---|---|---|---|---|---|
| Men's singles WH1 | GS | GS | | GS | R16 | ¼ | ½ | F | |

== Seeds ==
The following players were seeded:

1. Choi Jung-man (KOR) (final; silver medalist)
2. Muhammad Ikhwan Ramli (MAS) (semi-finals; bronze medalist)
3. Jeong Jae-gun (KOR) (quarter-finals)
4. Keita Nishimura (JPN) (quarter-finals)
5. Osamu Nagashima (JPN) (quarter-finals)
6. Prem Kumar Ale (IND) (round of 16)

== Group stage ==
=== Group A ===
| Pos | Team | Pld | W | L | GF | GA | GD | PF | PA | PD | Qualification |
|---|---|---|---|---|---|---|---|---|---|---|---|
| 1 | Choi Jung-man (KOR) [1] | 2 | 2 | 0 | 4 | 0 | +4 | 84 | 51 | +33 | Qualification to elimination stage |
| 2 | Jakarin Homhual (THA) | 2 | 1 | 1 | 2 | 2 | 0 | 76 | 63 | +13 | Qualification to elimination stage |
| 3 | Fang Chih-tsung (TPE) | 2 | 0 | 2 | 0 | 4 | −4 | 38 | 84 | −46 | |

Source: Group A – standings

| Date | | Score | | Game 1 | Game 2 | Game 3 |
|---|---|---|---|---|---|---|
| 20 Oct | Jakarin Homhual (Thailand) | 2–0 | (Chinese Taipei) Fang Chih-tsung | 21–9 | 21–12 | |
| 21 Oct | Choi Jung-man (South Korea) | 2–0 | (Thailand) Jakarin Homhual | 21–15 | 21–19 | |
| 23 Oct | Choi Jung-man (South Korea) | 2–0 | (Chinese Taipei) Fang Chih-tsung | 21–8 | 21–9 | |

=== Group B ===
| Pos | Team | Pld | W | L | GF | GA | GD | PF | PA | PD | Qualification |
|---|---|---|---|---|---|---|---|---|---|---|---|
| 1 | Qu Zimo (CHN) (H) | 2 | 2 | 0 | 4 | 0 | +4 | 84 | 32 | +52 | Qualification to elimination stage |
| 2 | Muhammad Ikhwan Ramli (MAS) [2] | 2 | 1 | 1 | 2 | 2 | 0 | 60 | 73 | −13 | Qualification to elimination stage |
| 3 | Lee Sam-seop (KOR) | 2 | 0 | 2 | 0 | 4 | −4 | 45 | 84 | −39 | |

Source: Group B – standings
(H) Host

| Date | | Score | | Game 1 | Game 2 | Game 3 |
|---|---|---|---|---|---|---|
| 20 Oct | Lee Sam-seop (South Korea) | 0–2 | (China) Qu Zimo | 9–21 | 5–21 | |
| 21 Oct | Muhammad Ikhwan Ramli (Malaysia) | 2–0 | (South Korea) Lee Sam-seop | 21–15 | 21–16 | |
| 23 Oct | Muhammad Ikhwan Ramli (Malaysia) | 0–2 | (China) Qu Zimo | 9–21 | 9–21 | |

=== Group C ===
| Pos | Team | Pld | W | L | GF | GA | GD | PF | PA | PD | Qualification |
|---|---|---|---|---|---|---|---|---|---|---|---|
| 1 | Jeong Jae-gun (KOR) [3/4] | 2 | 2 | 0 | 4 | 0 | +4 | 84 | 38 | +46 | Qualification to elimination stage |
| 2 | Agung Widodo (INA) | 2 | 1 | 1 | 2 | 2 | 0 | 70 | 54 | +16 | Qualification to elimination stage |
| 3 | Isaa Hasan (SYR) | 2 | 0 | 2 | 0 | 4 | −4 | 22 | 84 | −62 | |

Source: Group C – standings

| Date | | Score | | Game 1 | Game 2 | Game 3 |
|---|---|---|---|---|---|---|
| 20 Oct | Agung Widodo (Indonesia) | 2–0 | (Syria) Isaa Hasan | 21–8 | 21–4 | |
| 21 Oct | Jeong Jae-gun (South Korea) | 2–0 | (Indonesia) Agung Widodo | 21–13 | 21–15 | |
| 23 Oct | Jeong Jae-gun (South Korea) | 2–0 | (Syria) Isaa Hasan | 21–3 | 21–7 | |

=== Group D ===
| Pos | Team | Pld | W | L | GF | GA | GD | PF | PA | PD | Qualification |
|---|---|---|---|---|---|---|---|---|---|---|---|
| 1 | Keita Nishimura (JPN) [3/4] | 2 | 2 | 0 | 4 | 0 | +4 | 84 | 33 | +51 | Qualification to elimination stage |
| 2 | Shashank Kumar (IND) | 2 | 1 | 1 | 2 | 2 | 0 | 70 | 50 | +20 | Qualification to elimination stage |
| 3 | Amer Sammour (SYR) | 2 | 0 | 2 | 0 | 4 | −4 | 13 | 84 | −71 | |

Source: Group D – standings

| Date | | Score | | Game 1 | Game 2 | Game 3 |
|---|---|---|---|---|---|---|
| 20 Oct | Amer Sammour (Syria) | 0–2 | (India) Shashank Kumar | 1–21 | 7–21 | |
| 21 Oct | Keita Nishimura (Japan) | 2–0 | (Syria) Amer Sammour | 21–1 | 21–4 | |
| 23 Oct | Keita Nishimura (Japan) | 2–0 | (India) Shashank Kumar | 21–13 | 21–15 | |

=== Group E ===
| Pos | Team | Pld | W | L | GF | GA | GD | PF | PA | PD | Qualification |
|---|---|---|---|---|---|---|---|---|---|---|---|
| 1 | Yang Tong (CHN) (H) | 2 | 2 | 0 | 4 | 0 | +4 | 84 | 26 | +58 | Qualification to elimination stage |
| 2 | Osamu Nagashima (JPN) [5/6] | 2 | 1 | 1 | 2 | 2 | 0 | 63 | 50 | +13 | Qualification to elimination stage |
| 3 | Jamal Khalifa Al-Bedwawi (UAE) | 2 | 0 | 2 | 0 | 4 | −4 | 13 | 84 | −71 | |

Source: Group E – standings
(H) Host

| Date | | Score | | Game 1 | Game 2 | Game 3 |
|---|---|---|---|---|---|---|
| 20 Oct | Yang Tong (China) | 2–0 | (United Arab Emirates) Jamal Khalifa Al-Bedwawi | 21–3 | 21–2 | |
| 21 Oct | Osamu Nagashima (Japan) | 0–2 | (China) Yang Tong | 10–21 | 11–21 | |
| 23 Oct | Osamu Nagashima (Japan) | 2–0 | (United Arab Emirates) Jamal Khalifa Al-Bedwawi | 21–2 | 21–6 | |

=== Group F ===
| Pos | Team | Pld | W | L | GF | GA | GD | PF | PA | PD | Qualification |
|---|---|---|---|---|---|---|---|---|---|---|---|
| 1 | Prem Kumar Ale (IND) [5/6] | 3 | 3 | 0 | 6 | 0 | +6 | 128 | 77 | +51 | Qualification to elimination stage |
| 2 | Chatchai Kornpeekanok (THA) | 3 | 2 | 1 | 4 | 3 | +1 | 136 | 104 | +32 | Qualification to elimination stage |
| 3 | Hoàng Mạnh Giang (VIE) | 3 | 1 | 2 | 3 | 5 | −2 | 118 | 147 | −29 | |
| 4 | Dung Shiau-wei (TPE) | 3 | 0 | 3 | 1 | 6 | −5 | 86 | 140 | −54 | |

Source: Group F – standings

| Date | | Score | | Game 1 | Game 2 | Game 3 |
|---|---|---|---|---|---|---|
| 20 Oct | Prem Kumar Ale (India) | 2–0 | (Chinese Taipei) Dung Shiau-wei | 21–8 | 21–7 | |
| 20 Oct | Hoàng Mạnh Giang (Vietnam) | 1–2 | (Thailand) Chatchai Kornpeekanok | 21–13 | 11–21 | 7–21 |
| 21 Oct | Prem Kumar Ale (India) | 2–0 | (Vietnam) Hoàng Mạnh Giang | 21–11 | 21–12 | |
| 21 Oct | Chatchai Kornpeekanok (Thailand) | 2–0 | (Chinese Taipei) Dung Shiau-wei | 21–8 | 21–13 | |
| 23 Oct | Prem Kumar Ale (India) | 2–0 | (Thailand) Chatchai Kornpeekanok | 23–21 | 21–18 | |
| 23 Oct | Hoàng Mạnh Giang (Vietnam) | 2–1 | (Chinese Taipei) Dung Shiau-wei | 21–10 | 14–21 | 21–19 |

== Elimination round ==
Top two ranked in each group qualified to the elimination round, the draw was decided after the previous round finished.

Round of 16
5/6 | Osamu Nagashima (JPN) | 21 | 21
Shashank Kumar (IND) | 11 | 15
Yang Tong (CHN) | 21 | 21
Chatchai Kornpeekanok (THA) | 3 | 8
2 | Muhammad Ikhwan Ramli (MAS) | 21 | 21
5/6 | Prem Kumar Ale (IND) | 18 | 12
Jakarin Homhual (THA) | 21 | 21
Agung Widodo (INA) | 12 | 18

Quarter-finals
1 | Choi Jung-man (KOR) | 21 | 21
5/6 | Osamu Nagashima (JPN) | 13 | 12
3/4 | Jeong Jae-gun (KOR) | 13 | 19
Yang Tong (CHN) | 21 | 21
2 | Muhammad Ikhwan Ramli (MAS) | 21 | 21
3/4 | Keita Nishimura (JPN) | 13 | 10
Jakarin Homhual (THA) | 6 | 13
Qu Zimo (CHN) | 21 | 21

Semi-finals
1 | Choi Jung-man (KOR) | 21 | 21
Yang Tong (CHN) | 10 | 18
2 | Muhammad Ikhwan Ramli (MAS) | 8 | 7
Qu Zimo (CHN) | 21 | 21

Final
1 | Choi Jung-man (KOR) | 5 | 10
Qu Zimo (CHN) | 21 | 21
