= Badminton at the 2023 Parapan American Games – Men's singles WH2 =

Men's singles WH2 at the Parapan American Games
- Venue: Olympic Training Center, Santiago
- Dates: 22 – 26 November 2023
- Competitors: 8 from 6 nations

Medalists
1st place, gold medalist(s)		Jaime Aránguiz	Chile
2nd place, silver medalist(s)		Júlio Godoy	Brazil
3rd place, bronze medalist(s)		Bernard Lapointe	Canada

The men's singles WH2 badminton tournament at the 2023 Parapan American Games is playing from 22 to 26 November 2023 at the Olympic Training Center in Santiago, Chile. A total of eight players competed at the tournament, two of whom were seeded.

== Seeds ==
The following players were seeded:

1. Jaime Aránguiz (CHI)
2. Júlio Godoy (BRA)

== Group stage ==
=== Group A ===
Pos	Team	Pld	W	L	GF	GA	GD	PF	PA	PD	Qualification
1	Jaime Aránguiz (CHI) [1]	0	0	0	0	0	0	0	0	0	Qualification to elimination stage
2	Edmar Barbosa (BRA)	0	0	0	0	0	0	0	0	0	Qualification to elimination stage
3	Roberth Fajardo (PER)	0	0	0	0	0	0	0	0	0	
4	José Ambrosio Chaves (BRA)	0	0	0	0	0	0	0	0	0	

First match(es) will be played: 22 November 2023. Source: Group A – standings

Date	Competitor	Score	Competitor	Game 1	Game 2	Game 3
	Jaime Aránguiz (Chile)	[0–0]	(Peru) Roberth Fajardo	–	–	
	José Ambrosio Chaves (Brazil)	[0–0]	(Brazil) Edmar Barbosa	–	–	
	Roberth Fajardo (Peru)	[0–0]	(Brazil) Edmar Barbosa	–	–	
	Jaime Aránguiz (Chile)	[0–0]	(Brazil) José Ambrosio Chaves	–	–	
	Jaime Aránguiz (Chile)	[0–0]	(Brazil) Edmar Barbosa	–	–	
	Roberth Fajardo (Peru)	[0–0]	(Brazil) José Ambrosio Chaves	–	–	

=== Group B ===
Pos	Team	Pld	W	L	GF	GA	GD	PF	PA	PD	Qualification
1	Júlio Godoy (BRA) [2]	0	0	0	0	0	0	0	0	0	Qualification to elimination stage
2	Amilcar Robledo (ARG)	0	0	0	0	0	0	0	0	0	Qualification to elimination stage
3	Arturo Zambrano Alejo (MEX)	0	0	0	0	0	0	0	0	0	
4	Bernard Lapointe (CAN)	0	0	0	0	0	0	0	0	0	

First match(es) will be played: 22 November 2023. Source: Group B – standings

Date	Competitor	Score	Competitor	Game 1	Game 2	Game 3
	Júlio Godoy (Brazil)	[0–0]	(Mexico) Arturo Zambrano Alejo	–	–	
	Bernard Lapointe (Canada)	[0–0]	(Argentina) Amilcar Robledo	–	–	
	Arturo Zambrano Alejo (Mexico)	[0–0]	(Argentina) Amilcar Robledo	–	–	
	Júlio Godoy (Brazil)	[0–0]	(Canada) Bernard Lapointe	–	–	
	Júlio Godoy (Brazil)	[0–0]	(Argentina) Amilcar Robledo	–	–	
	Arturo Zambrano Alejo (Mexico)	[0–0]	(Canada) Bernard Lapointe	–	–	

== Elimination round ==
Semi-finals

Gold medal match
Bronze medal match
