= Jaime Aránguiz =

Chilean para-badminton player

Personal information
- Born: Jaime Nicolás Aránguiz Urrutia; 22 November 1992 (age 33) Santiago, Chile

Sport
- Country: Chile
- Sport: Badminton
- Handedness: Right

Men's singles WH2 Men's doubles WH1–WH2 Mixed doubles WH1–WH2
- Highest ranking: 7 (MS 18 July 2023); 16 (MD with Yuri Ferrigno 2 August 2023); 4 (XD with To Man-kei 21 May 2024)
- Current ranking: 10 (MS); 51 (MD with Lee Sam-seop); 8 (XD with To Man-kei) (8 October 2024)
- BWF profile
Medal record
Men's para-badminton
Representing Chile
World Championships
Bronze medal – third place	2026 Manama	Mixed doubles
Parapan American Games
Gold medal – first place	2023 Santiago	Men's singles
Pan Am Championships
Gold medal – first place	2022 Cali	Men's singles
Bronze medal – third place	2018 Lima	Men's singles
Bronze medal – third place	2018 Lima	Men's doubles
Bronze medal – third place	2022 Cali	Men's doubles
Bronze medal – third place	2022 Cali	Mixed doubles
South American Championships
Gold medal – first place	2018 Lima	Men's singles
Gold medal – first place	2018 Lima	Men's doubles
Gold medal – first place	2022 Lima	Men's singles
Gold medal – first place	2022 Lima	Men's doubles
Bronze medal – third place	2018 Lima	Mixed doubles

Jaime Nicolás Aránguiz Urrutia (born 22 November 1992) is a Chilean para-badminton player. He won gold in the men's singles WH2 event at the 2023 Parapan American Games. He became the first Chilean para-badminton player to compete in the Paralympics when he made his debut at the 2024 Summer Paralympics in Paris.

== Biography ==
Aránguiz was born with osteogenesis imperfecta. He was introduced to para-badminton in 2015 by fellow Chilean para-badminton player Catalina Jimeno.

== Achievements ==
=== Parapan American Games ===
Men's singles WH2
Year	Venue	Opponent	Score	Result
2023	Olympic Training Center; Santiago, Chile	(Brazil) Julio César Godoy	21–15, 21–11	Gold

=== Pan Am Championships ===
Men's singles WH2
Year	Venue	Opponent	Score	Result
2018	National Sport Village; Lima, Peru	(Canada) Bernard Lapointe	15–21, 17–21	Bronze
2022	Coliseo Alberto León Betancur, Cali, Colombia	(Brazil) Julio César Godoy	21–14, 21–14	Gold

Men's doubles WH1–WH2
Year	Venue	Partner	Opponent	Score	Result
2018	National Sport Village; Lima, Peru	(Chile) Constancio Cancino	(Brazil) Rodolfo Cano (Brazil) Gabriel Jannini	7–21, 7–21	Bronze
2022	Coliseo Alberto León Betancur; Cali, Colombia	(Colombia) Víctor Aragón	(Brazil) Edmar Barbosa (Brazil) Rodolfo Cano	7–21, 16–21	Bronze

Mixed doubles WH1–WH2
Year	Venue	Partner	Opponent	Score	Result
2022	Coliseo Alberto León Betancur; Cali, Colombia	(Brazil) Ana Gomes	(Brazil) José Ambrósio (Brazil) Auricélia Nunes	16–21, 24–22, 17–21	Bronze

=== South American Championships ===
Men's singles WH2
Year	Venue	Opponent	Score	Result
2018	Polideportivo 2 de la Videna; Lima, Peru	(Brazil) Rômulo Soares	21–17, 21–19	Gold
2022	Polideportivo 2 de la Videna; Lima, Peru	(Peru) Roberth Fajardo	21–9, 21–14	Gold

Men's doubles WH1–WH2

Year	Venue	Partner	Opponent	Score	Result
2018	Polideportivo 2 de la Videna, Lima, Peru	(Brazil) Rodolfo Cano	(Peru) Ronald Miranda (Brazil) Rômulo Soares	21–5, 21–8	Gold
2022	Polideportivo 2 de la Videna, Lima, Peru	(Peru) Ronald Miranda	(Brazil) Sivaldo Bezerra (Brazil) Osvaldo Crema Junior	21–6, 21–11	Gold
2022	Polideportivo 2 de la Videna, Lima, Peru	(Peru) Ronald Miranda	(Peru) Roberth Fajardo (Peru) Fernando Vilcachagua	19–21, 21–15, 21–6	Gold
2022	Polideportivo 2 de la Videna, Lima, Peru	(Peru) Ronald Miranda	(Argentina) Lucas Díaz (Argentina) Amilcar Sebastián	21–15, 21–8	Gold
2022	Polideportivo 2 de la Videna, Lima, Peru	(Peru) Ronald Miranda	(Brazil) José Ambrósio (Brazil) Sergio Barreto	21–15, 21–16	Gold

Mixed doubles WH1–WH2
Year	Venue	Partner	Opponent	Score	Result
2018	Polideportivo 2 de la Videna; Lima, Peru	(Chile) Catalina Jimeno	(Peru) Roberth Fajardo (Peru) Pilar Jáuregui	10–21, 11–21	Bronze

=== BWF Para Badminton World Circuit (1 title, 4 runners-up) ===
The BWF Para Badminton World Circuit – Grade 2, Level 1, 2 and 3 tournaments has been sanctioned by the Badminton World Federation from 2022.

Men's singles WH2
Year	Tournament	Level	Opponent	Score	Result
2022	Brazil Para-Badminton International	Level 2	(Japan) Daiki Kajiwara	12–21, 8–21	(silver) Runner-up
2022	Peru Para-Badminton International	Level 2	(Japan) Takumi Matsumoto	13–21, 12–21	(silver) Runner-up

Men's doubles WH1–WH2
Year	Tournament	Level	Partner	Opponent	Score	Result
2022	Peru Para-Badminton International	Level 2	(Brazil) Ana Gomes	(South Korea) Ryu Dong-hyun (Peru) Pilar Jáuregui	5–21, 10–21	(silver) Runner-up
2023	Canada Para-Badminton International	Level 1	(Belgium) To Man-kei	(India) Prem Kumar Ale (Turkey) Emine Seçkin	13–21, 18–21	(silver) Runner-up
2023	Western Australia Para-Badminton International	Level 2	(Belgium) To Man-kei	(Italy) Yuri Ferrigno (Peru) Pilar Jáuregui	21–12, 13–21, 21–16	(gold) Winner
