= Choi Jung-man =

South Korean para badminton player (born 1979)

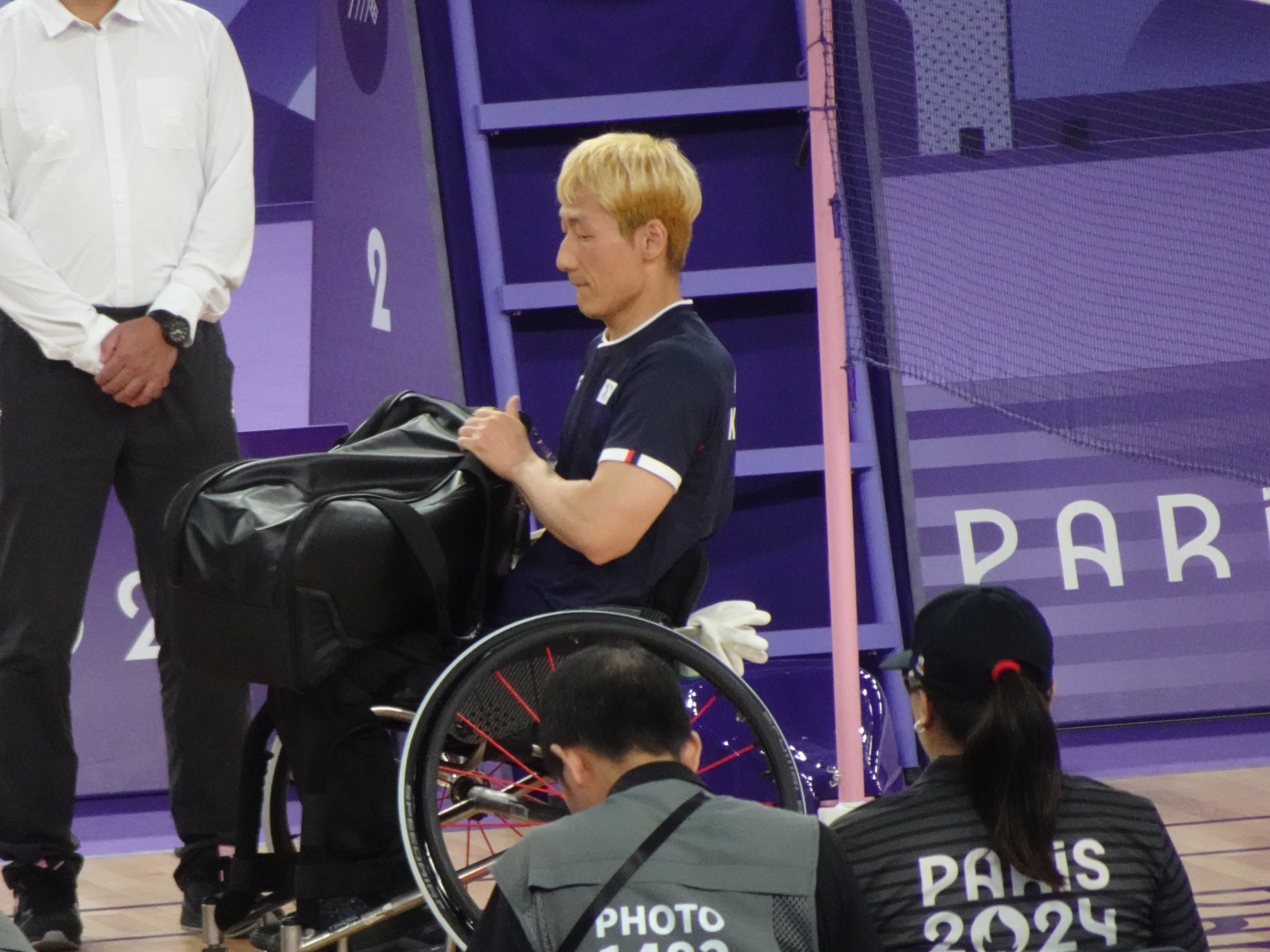
- Choi at the 2024 Summer Paralympics

Personal information
- Born: 8 January 1979 (age 47) South Gyeongsang Province, South Korea
- Height: 1.70 m (5 ft 7 in)

Sport
- Country: South Korea
- Sport: Badminton
- Handedness: Left

Men's singles WH1 Men's doubles WH1–WH2 Mixed doubles WH1–WH2
- Highest ranking: 1 (MS 3 September 2024); 1 (MD with Kim Jung-jun 27 August 2024); 1 (XD with Lee Sun-ae 11 April 2023)
- Current ranking: 1 (MS); 2 (MD with Kim Jung-jun); 14 (XD with Lee Sun-ae) (3 September 2024)
- BWF profile
Medal record
Men's para badminton
Representing South Korea
Paralympic Games
Silver medal – second place	2024 Paris	Men's singles
World Championships
Gold medal – first place	2007 Bangkok	Men's doubles
Gold medal – first place	2007 Bangkok	Mixed doubles
Gold medal – first place	2022 Tokyo	Men's singles
Gold medal – first place	2022 Tokyo	Mixed doubles
Silver medal – second place	2005 Hsinchu	Men's doubles
Silver medal – second place	2007 Bangkok	Men's singles
Silver medal – second place	2017 Ulsan	Men's doubles
Silver medal – second place	2024 Pattaya	Men's singles
Bronze medal – third place	2019 Basel	Men's singles
Bronze medal – third place	2019 Basel	Men's doubles
Bronze medal – third place	2024 Pattaya	Men's doubles
Bronze medal – third place	2024 Pattaya	Mixed doubles
Bronze medal – third place	2026 Manama	Men's singles
Asian Para Games
Gold medal – first place	2014 Incheon	Men's singles
Gold medal – first place	2014 Incheon	Men's doubles
Gold medal – first place	2018 Jakarta	Men's singles
Silver medal – second place	2010 Guangzhou	Men's singles
Silver medal – second place	2022 Hangzhou	Men's singles
Silver medal – second place	2022 Hangzhou	Men's doubles
Bronze medal – third place	2018 Jakarta	Men's doubles

Choi Jung-man (Korean: 최정만, born 8 January 1979) is a South Korean para badminton player. He competed at the 2024 Summer Paralympics, where he reached the finals of the men's singles WH1 event and won a silver medal.

== Biography ==
Choi was an active Taekwondo athlete during his high school years. In 1996, he suffered spinal nerve damage in a traffic accident in 1996, paralyzing the lower half of his body.

After becoming disabled, he transformed into a wheelchair badminton player and rekindled his dream of becoming an athlete. After being selected as a national team member, he demonstrated world-class skills in domestic and international competitions.

== Achievements ==
=== Paralympic Games ===
Men's singles WH1

Year	Venue	Opponent	Score	Result
2024	Porte de La Chapelle Arena, Paris, France	(China) Qu Zimo	3–21, 7–21	Silver

=== World Championships ===
Men's singles WH1
Year	Venue	Opponent	Score	Result
2007	Gymnasium 1 Bangkok, Thailand	(South Korea) Lee Sam-seop	13–21, 11–21	Silver
2019	St. Jakobshalle, Basel, Switzerland	(China) Qu Zimo	15–21, 17–21	Bronze
2022	Yoyogi National Gymnasium; Tokyo, Japan	(South Korea) Jeong Jae-gun	21–9, 21–17	Gold
2024	Pattaya Exhibition and Convention Hall; Pattaya, Thailand	(China) Qu Zimo	18–21, 21–19, 15–21	Silver
2026	Isa Sports City, Manama, Bahrain	(Japan) Keita Nishimura	19–21, 21–11, 18–21	Bronze

Men's doubles WH1–WH2
Year	Venue	Partner	Opponent	Score	Result
2005	Hsinchu Municipal Gymnasium, Hsinchu, Taiwan	(South Korea) Lee Sam-seop	(Germany) Avni Kertmen (Germany) Thomas Wandschneider	0–2	Silver
2007	Gymnasium 1 Bangkok, Thailand	(South Korea) Lee Sam-seop	(Turkey) Avni Kertmen (Germany) Thomas Wandschneider	21–17, 21–16	Gold
2017	Dongchun Gymnasium, Ulsan, South Korea	(South Korea) Kim Sung-hun	(South Korea) Kim Jung-jun (South Korea) Lee Sam-seop	21–16, 10–21, 8–21	Silver
2019	St. Jakobshalle, Basel, Switzerland	(South Korea) Kim Kyung-hoon	(China) Mai Jianpeng (China) Qu Zimo	19–21, 13–21	Bronze
2024	Pattaya Exhibition and Convention Hall, Pattaya, Thailand	(South Korea) Kim Jung-jun	(China) Mai Jianpeng (China) Qu Zimo	10–21, 17–21	Bronze

Mixed doubles WH1–WH2
Year	Venue	Partner	Opponent	Score	Result
2007	Gymnasium 1 Bangkok, Thailand	(South Korea) Lee Mi-ok	(South Korea) Lee Ae-kyung (South Korea) Lee Sam-seop	18–21, 21–16, 21–18	Gold
2022	Yoyogi National Gymnasium, Tokyo, Japan	(South Korea) Lee Sun-ae	(Italy) Yuri Ferrigno (Peru) Pilar Jáuregui	21–17, 21–12	Gold
2024	Pattaya Exhibition and Convention Hall, Pattaya, Thailand	(South Korea) Lee Sun-ae	(China) Yang Tong (China) Li Hongyan	6–21, 5–21	Bronze

=== Asian Para Games ===
Men's singles WH1
Year	Venue	Opponent	Score	Result
2010	Tianhe Gymnasium; Guangzhou, China	(South Korea) Lee Sam-seop	7–21, 24–22, 12–21	Silver
2014	Gyeyang Gymnasium; Incheon, South Korea	(South Korea) Lee Sam-seop	21–18, 18–21, 21–18	Gold
2018	Istora Gelora Bung Karno; Jakarta, Indonesia	(China) Qu Zimo	15–21, 21–18, 21–12	Gold
2022	Binjiang Gymnasium; Hangzhou, China	(China) Qu Zimo	5–21, 10–21	Silver

Men's doubles WH1–WH2

Year	Venue	Partner	Opponent	Score	Result
2014	Gyeyang Gymnasium, Incheon, South Korea	(South Korea) Kim Sung-hun	(South Korea) Kim Kyung-hoon (South Korea) Lee Sam-seop	13–21, 22–20, 21–17	Gold
2014	Gyeyang Gymnasium, Incheon, South Korea	(South Korea) Kim Sung-hun	(Thailand) Jakarin Homhual (Thailand) Dumnern Junthong	21–11, 21–12	Gold
2014	Gyeyang Gymnasium, Incheon, South Korea	(South Korea) Kim Sung-hun	(Japan) Osamu Nagashima (Japan) Seiji Yamami	21–14, 21–13	Gold
2014	Gyeyang Gymnasium, Incheon, South Korea	(South Korea) Kim Sung-hun	(Vietnam) Trần Mai Anh (Vietnam) Trương Ngọc Bình	21–8, 21–15	Gold
2018	Istora Gelora Bung Karno, Jakarta, Indonesia	(South Korea) Kim Kyung-hoon	(China) Mai Jianpeng (China) Qu Zimo	19–21, 15–21	Bronze
2022	Binjiang Gymnasium, Hangzhou, China	(South Korea) Kim Jung-jun	(China) Mai Jianpeng (China) Qu Zimo	15–21, 16–21	Silver

=== BWF Para Badminton World Circuit (16 titles, 9 runners-up) ===
The BWF Para Badminton World Circuit – Grade 2, Level 1, 2 and 3 tournaments has been sanctioned by the Badminton World Federation from 2022.

Men's singles WH1
Year	Tournament	Level	Opponent	Score	Result
2022	Bahrain Para Badminton International	Level 2	(Malaysia) Muhammad Ikhwan Ramli	21–18, 21–15	(gold) Winner
2022	Dubai Para Badminton International	Level 2	(Malaysia) Muhammad Ikhwan Ramli	21–8, 21–16	(gold) Winner
2023	Spanish Para Badminton International II	Level 2	(Japan) Hiroshi Murayama	22–20, 21–19	(gold) Winner
2023	Spanish Para Badminton International I	Level 1	(Japan) Hiroshi Murayama	21–18, 19–21, 11–21	(silver) Runner-up
2023	Brazil Para Badminton International	Level 2	(Japan) Hiroshi Murayama	21–15, 16–21, 21–16	(gold) Winner
2023	Thailand Para Badminton International	Level 2	(China) Qu Zimo	21–12, 8–21, 19–21	(silver) Runner-up
2023	Bahrain Para Badminton International	Level 2	(China) Qu Zimo	15–21, 13–21	(silver) Runner-up
2023	Canada Para Badminton International	Level 1	(Japan) Hiroshi Murayama	27–25, 17–21, 19–21	(silver) Runner-up
2023	4 Nations Para Badminton International	Level 1	(Malaysia) Muhammad Ikhwan Ramli	21–16, 21–12	(gold) Winner
2024	Spanish Para Badminton International I	Level 1	(South Korea) Lee Sam-seop	21–12, 21–10	(gold) Winner
2024	4 Nations Para Badminton International	Level 1	(Malaysia) Muhammad Ikhwan Ramli	21–14, 21–15	(gold) Winner

Men's doubles WH1–WH2
Year	Tournament	Level	Partner	Opponent	Score	Result
2022	Bahrain Para Badminton International	Level 2	(South Korea) Kim Jung-jun	(Germany) Rick Hellmann (Germany) Thomas Wandschneider	12–21, 21–10, 21–11	(gold) Winner
2022	Dubai Para Badminton International	Level 2	(South Korea) Kim Jung-jun	(Malaysia) Noor Azwan Noorlan (Malaysia) Muhammad Ikhwan Ramli	21–13, 21–12	(gold) Winner
2022	Thailand Para Badminton International	Level 1	(South Korea) Kim Jung-jun	(South Korea) Jeong Jae-gun (South Korea) Yu Soo-young	21–9, 21–12	(gold) Winner
2023	Spanish Para Badminton International I	Level 1	(South Korea) Kim Jung-jun	(Japan) Daiki Kajiwara (Japan) Hiroshi Murayama	21–18, 21–19	(gold) Winner
2023	Thailand Para Badminton International	Level 2	(South Korea) Kim Jung-jun	(China) Mai Jianpeng (China) Qu Zimo	21–17, 14–21, 21–17	(gold) Winner
2023	Canada Para Badminton International	Level 1	(South Korea) Kim Jung-jun	(Japan) Daiki Kajiwara (Japan) Hiroshi Murayama	11–21, 21–17, 16–21	(silver) Runner-up
2023	4 Nations Para Badminton International	Level 1	(South Korea) Kim Jung-jun	(Japan) Daiki Kajiwara (Japan) Hiroshi Murayama	21–18, 19–21, 21–16	(gold) Winner
2023	Canada Para Badminton International	Level 1	(South Korea) Kim Jung-jun	(Japan) Daiki Kajiwara (Japan) Hiroshi Murayama	11–21, 21–17, 16–21	(silver) Runner-up
2023	Dubai Para Badminton International	Level 1	(South Korea) Kim Jung-jun	(China) Mai Jianpeng (China) Qu Zimo	13–21, 17–21	(silver) Runner-up
2024	Spanish Para Badminton International II	Level 2	(South Korea) Kim Jung-jun	(Japan) Takumi Matsumoto (Japan) Keita Nishimura	22–20, 21–19	(gold) Winner

Mixed doubles WH1–WH2
Year	Tournament	Level	Partner	Opponent	Score	Result
2022	Dubai Para Badminton International	Level 2	(South Korea) Lee Sun-ae	(South Korea) Yu Soo-young (South Korea) Kwon Hyun-ah	16–21, 21–12, 17–21	(silver) Runner-up
2023	Spanish Para Badminton International I	Level 1	(South Korea) Lee Sun-ae	(South Korea) Yu Soo-young (South Korea) Kwon Hyun-ah	19–21, 21–19, 23–21	(gold) Winner
2023	4 Nations Para Badminton International	Level 1	(South Korea) Lee Sun-ae	(Italy) Yuri Ferrigno (Peru) Pilar Jáuregui	21–13, 19–21, 18–21	(silver) Runner-up
2023	Dubai Para Badminton International	Level 1	(South Korea) Jung Gye-oul	(Hong Kong) Chan Ho Yuen (Belgium) Man-Kei To	21–18, 18–21, 21–15	(gold) Winner

=== International tournaments (from 2011 to 2021; 8 titles, 6 runners-up) ===
Men's singles WH1
Year	Tournament	Opponent	Score	Result
2012	Spanish Para Badminton International	(South Korea) Lee Sam-seop	15–21, 19–21	(silver) Runner-up
2017	Spanish Para Badminton International	(South Korea) Lee Sam-seop	21–13, 18–21, 21–11	(gold) Winner
2018	Spanish Para Badminton International	(South Korea) Lee Sam-seop	21–17, 21–9	(gold) Winner
2018	Australia Para Badminton International	(Japan) Hiroshi Murayama	21–16, 21–12	(gold) Winner
2019	Turkish Para Badminton International	(China) Qu Zimo	8–21, 14–21	(silver) Runner-up
2019	Dubai Para Badminton International	(China) Qu Zimo	19–21, 14–21	(silver) Runner-up
2019	Japan Para Badminton International	(China) Qu Zimo	10–21, 16–21	(silver) Runner-up

Men's doubles WH1–WH2
Year	Tournament	Partner	Opponent	Score	Result
2012	Spanish Para Badminton International	(South Korea) Lee Sam-seop	(Turkey) Avni Kertmen (Germany) Thomas Wandschneider	21–13, 21–17	(gold) Winner
2017	Spanish Para Badminton International	(South Korea) Kim Jung-jun	(South Korea) Kim Kyung-hoon (South Korea) Lee Sam-seop	21–14, 21–15	(gold) Winner
2017	Japan Para Badminton International	(South Korea) Kim Jung-jun	(South Korea) Kim Kyung-hoon (South Korea) Lee Sam-seop	21–16, 18–21, 19–21	(silver) Runner-up
2018	Spanish Para Badminton International	(South Korea) Kim Jung-jun	(South Korea) Jeong Jae-gun (South Korea) Lee Sam-seop	16–21, 21–11, 21–12	(gold) Winner
2018	Thailand Para Badminton International	(South Korea) Kim Kyung-hoon	(South Korea) Kim Jung-jun (South Korea) Lee Sam-seop	21–19, 21–19	(gold) Winner
2018	Australia Para Badminton International	(South Korea) Kim Jung-jun	Amir Levi (France) David Toupé	21–8, 21–17	(gold) Winner
2019	Canada Para Badminton International	(South Korea) Kim Kyung-hoon	(South Korea) Kim Jung-jun (South Korea) Lee Dong-seop	10–21, 17–21	(silver) Runner-up
