= Munna Khalid =

Indian para-badminton athlete

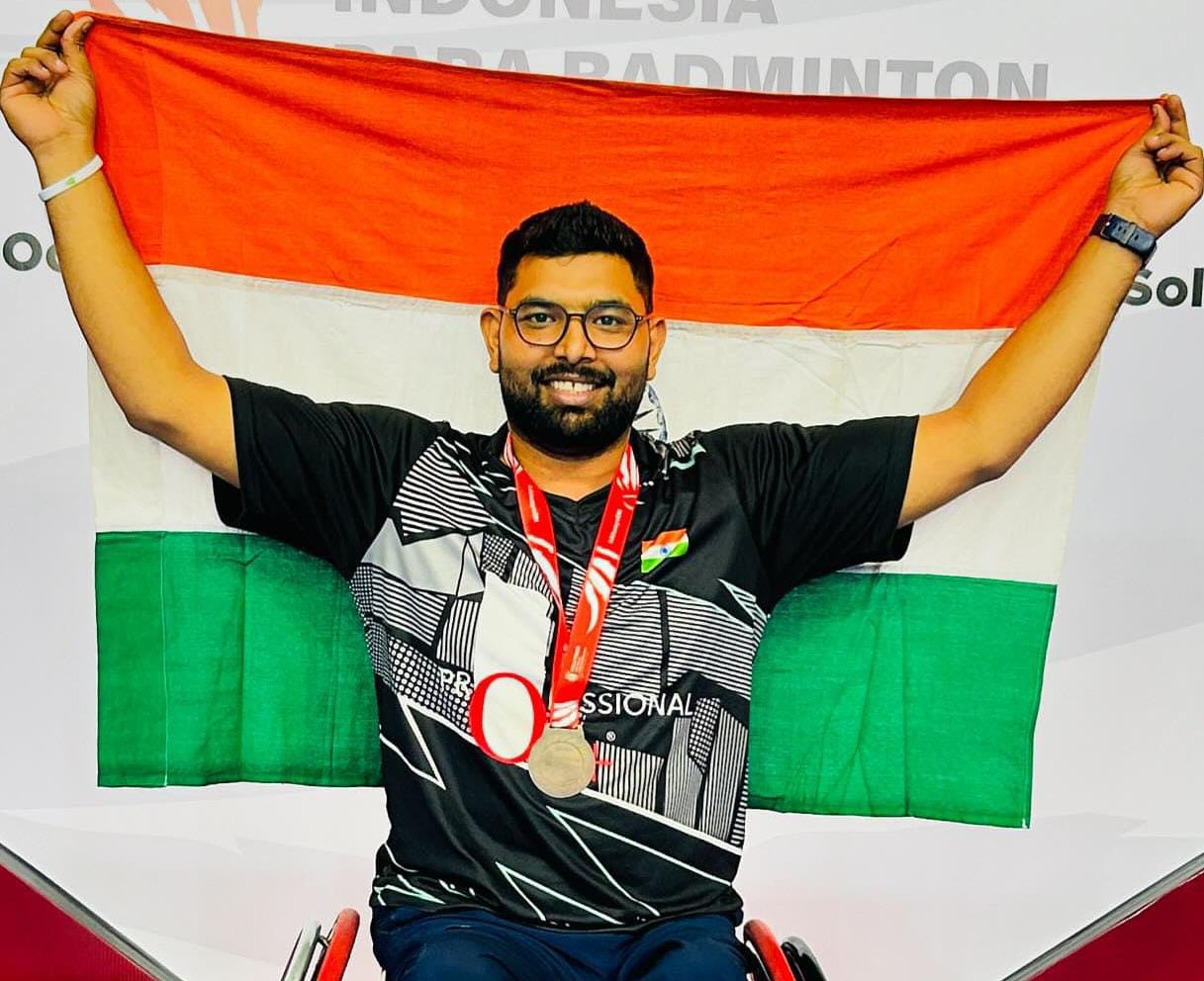

Personal information
- Born: 16 January 1995 (age 31) Uttar Pradesh, India
- Years active: 2016-present
- Height: 5.10"
- Weight: 77 kg (170 lb)

Sport
- Country: India India
- Sport: Badminton
- Highest ranking: 9 (17-11-2025)
- Current ranking: 9 (17-11-2025)
- Honours: Delhi State Award 2023 (Best Sports Person)
- BWF profile (archived)

Munna Khalid is an Indian para-badminton athlete.

== Education and background ==
Khalid was born in Khanpur, Bulandshahr district, Uttar Pradesh. He contracted polio just six months after his birth. He is the third eldest of seven siblings. He relocated to Delhi for his higher education, earning a BA (Hons) and a master's in social work, and is currently pursuing a PhD in Hindi Literature—all from Jamia Millia Islamia University.

== Achievements ==
International Level

- Year 2025 – Indonesia Para Badminton International 2025, held at Solo, Indonesia, 29 Oct - 02 Nov 2025– Bronze Medal (MD).
- Year 2025 – Asia Para Badminton Championship 2025, held at Korat, Thailand, 17–22 June 2025–Quarter Finalist (MS)
- Year 2024 – Bahrain Para Badminton International 2024 (Level-1), held at Manama, Bahrain, 10–15 December 2024–Bronze Medal (MS).
- Year 2024 – Bahrain Para Badminton International 2024 (Level-1), held at Manama, Bahrain, 10–15 December 2024–Bronze Medal (XD).
- Year 2024 – Indonesia Para Badminton International 2024, held at Solo, Indonesia, 17–22 September 2024– Bronze Medal (MD).
- Year 2024 – Indonesia Para Badminton International 2024, held at Solo, Indonesia, 17–22 September 2024– Bronze Medal (XD).
- Year 2024 – BWF Para Badminton World Championship 2024, held at Pattaya, Thailand 20–25 February 2024 – Pre-Quarter Finalist.
- Year 2024 – Uganda Para Badminton International 2024, held at Kampala, Uganda, 01-7 July 2024– Gold Medal (MS).
- Year 2024 – Uganda Para Badminton International 2024, held at Kampala, Uganda, 01-7 July 2024– Silver Medal (MD).
- Year 2024 – Uganda Para Badminton International 2024, held at Kampala, Uganda, 01-7 July 2024– Bronze Medal (XD).
- Year 2022 – Uganda Para Badminton International 2022, held at Kampala, Uganda, 11–18 September 2022 – Gold Medal (MD).
- Year 2022 – Uganda Para Badminton International 2022, held at Kampala, Uganda, 11–18 September 2022– Silver Medal (MS).
- Fox Indonesia Para Badminton International 2023 held at Solo, Indonesia, 05-10 September 2023 – Pre-Quarter Finalist.
- Year 2023 – Thailand Para Badminton International 2023, held at Pattaya, Thailand, 09-14 May 2023– Pre-Quarter Finalist
- Year 2022 – Bahrain Para Badminton International 2023, held at Manama, Bahrain, 17–23 May 2023 – Round-2.
- Year 2022 – 4th Fazza Dubai Para Badminton International 2022, held at Dubai, 23–29 May 2022 - Pre-Quarter Finalist.
- Year 2022 – Bahrain 1st International Para Badminton Tournament 2022, held at Bahrain, 23–29 May 2022 – Round-2.

National Level

- Year 2024- 6th National Para Badminton Championship 2023–24, held at Jamshedpur, Jharkhand. Obtained Silver Medal https://jmi.ac.in/upload/publication/pr1_English_2024March28.pdf
- Year 2023 - 1st Khelo India Para Games 2023, held at I.G. Stadium, New Delhi. Obtained Bronze Medal. December 10–17, 2023
- Year 2023- 5th National Para Badminton Championship 2022–23, held at Dr. Shakuntala Misra Rehabilitation University, Lucknow, U.P. Obtained 2 Bronze in Singles and Doubles respectively.
- Year 2021- 4th National Para Badminton Championship 2020, held at Bhubaneswar, Odisha, Obtained 2 Bronze in Singles and Doubles respectively.
