= Muhammad Ikhwan Ramli =

Malaysian para-badminton player

Personal information
- Born: 19 August 1995 (age 31) Terengganu, Malaysia

Sport
- Country: Malaysia
- Sport: Badminton
- Handedness: Right

Men's singles WH1 Men's doubles WH1–WH2
- Highest ranking: 1 (MS 23 August 2022); 1 (MD with Noor Azwan Noorlan 7 November 2022)
- Current ranking: 3 (MS); 4 (MD with Noor Azwan Noorlan) (3 September 2024)
- BWF profile
Medal record
Men's Para-badminton
Representing Malaysia
World Championships
Silver medal – second place	2022 Tokyo	Men's doubles
Silver medal – second place	2024 Pattaya	Men's doubles
Bronze medal – third place	2022 Tokyo	Men's singles
Bronze medal – third place	2026 Manama	Men's singles
Asian Para Games
Bronze medal – third place	2022 Hangzhou	Men's singles
ASEAN Para Games
Gold medal – first place	2017 Kuala Lumpur	Men's doubles
Gold medal – first place	2022 Surakarta	Men's singles
Gold medal – first place	2022 Surakarta	Men's doubles
Gold medal – first place	2023 Cambodia	Men's singles
Gold medal – first place	2023 Cambodia	Men's doubles
Silver medal – second place	2017 Kuala Lumpur	Men's singles

Muhammad Ikhwan bin Ramli (born 19 August 1995) is a Malaysian para-badminton player. Partnered with Noor Azwan Noorlan, the duo have won silver twice in the men's doubles WH1–WH2 event at the BWF Para-Badminton World Championships in 2022 and 2024.

Ikhwan made his Paralympic debut at the 2024 Summer Paralympics, where he competed in the men's singles WH1 event and the men's doubles WH1–WH2 event. He did not advance to the knockout stages.

== Achievements ==
=== World Championships ===
Men's singles WH1
Year	Venue	Opponent	Score	Result
2022	Yoyogi National Gymnasium; Tokyo, Japan	(South Korea) Choi Jung-man	13–21, 17–21	Bronze
2026	Isa Sports City, Manama, Bahrain	(China) Qu Zimo	9–21, 10–21	Bronze

Men's doubles WH1–WH2
Year	Venue	Partner	Opponent	Score	Result
2022	Yoyogi National Gymnasium, Tokyo, Japan	(Malaysia) Noor Azwan Noorlan	(Germany) Rick Hellmann (Germany) Thomas Wandschneider	11–21, 15–21	Silver
2024	Pattaya Exhibition and Convention Hall, Pattaya, Thailand	(Malaysia) Noor Azwan Noorlan	(China) Mai Jianpeng (China) Qu Zimo	10–21, 13–21	Silver

=== Asian Para Games ===
Men's singles WH1
Year	Venue	Opponent	Score	Result
2022	Binjiang Gymnasium; Hangzhou, China	(China) Qu Zimo	8–21, 7–21	Bronze

=== ASEAN Para Games ===
Men's singles WH1
Year	Venue	Opponent	Score	Result
2017	Axiata Arena; Kuala Lumpur, Malaysia	(Thailand) Jakarin Homhual	13–21, 21–16, 14–21	Silver
2022	Edutorium Muhammadiyah University of Surakarta; Surakarta, Indonesia	(Thailand) Chatchai Kornpeekanok	21–9, 21–11	Gold
2023	Morodok Techo Badminton Hall; Phnom Penh, Cambodia	(Thailand) Jakarin Homhual	21–15, 21–14	Gold

Men's doubles WH1–WH2
Year	Venue	Partner	Opponent	Score	Result
2017	Axiata Arena; Kuala Lumpur, Malaysia	(Malaysia) Madzlan Saibon	(Thailand) Jakarin Homhual (Thailand) Dumnern Junthong	22–20, 21–19	Gold
2022	Edutorium Muhammadiyah University of Surakarta; Surakarta, Indonesia	(Malaysia) Noor Azwan Noorlan	(Indonesia) Supriadi (Indonesia) Agung Widodo	19–21, 21–10, 21–18	Gold
2023	Morodok Techo Badminton Hall; Phnom Penh, Cambodia	(Malaysia) Noor Azwan Noorlan	(Thailand) Jakarin Homhual (Thailand) Dumnern Junthong	14–21, 21–17, 21–9	Gold

=== BWF Para Badminton World Circuit (5 titles, 10 runners-up) ===
The BWF Para Badminton World Circuit – Grade 2, Level 1, 2 and 3 tournaments has been sanctioned by the Badminton World Federation from 2022.

Men's singles WH1
Year	Tournament	Level	Opponent	Score	Result
2022	Spanish Para Badminton International II	Level 2	(Germany) Thomas Wandschneider	22–20, 22–24, 21–17	(gold) Winner
2022	Spanish Para Badminton International I	Level 1	(Germany) Thomas Wandschneider	21–12, 21–16	(gold) Winner
2022	Bahrain Para Badminton International	Level 2	(South Korea) Choi Jung-man	18–21, 15–21	(silver) Runner-up
2022	Dubai Para Badminton International	Level 2	(South Korea) Choi Jung-man	8–21, 16–21	(silver) Runner-up
2022	4 Nations Para Badminton International	Level 1	(Japan) Hiroshi Murayama	10–21, 14–21	(silver) Runner-up
2022	Thailand Para Badminton International I	Level 1	(South Korea) Jeong Jae-gun	21–23, 21–16, 21–19	(gold) Winner
2023	4 Nations Para Badminton International	Level 1	(South Korea) Choi Jung-man	16–21, 12–21	(silver) Runner-up
2023	Japan Para Badminton International	Level 2	(China) Qu Zimo	9–21, 9–21	(silver) Runner-up
2024	Bahrain Para Badminton International	Level 2	(France) David Toupé	21–17, 21–8	(gold) Winner
2024	4 Nations Para Badminton International	Level 1	(South Korea) Choi Jung-man	14–21, 15–21	(silver) Runner-up

Men's doubles WH1–WH2
Year	Tournament	Level	Partner	Opponent	Score	Result
2022	Spanish Para Badminton International II	Level 2	(Malaysia) Noor Azwan Noorlan	(Germany) Rick Hellmann (Germany) Thomas Wandschneider	14–21, 14–21	(silver) Runner-up
2022	Spanish Para Badminton International I	Level 1	(Malaysia) Noor Azwan Noorlan	(Japan) Daiki Kajiwara (Japan) Keita Nishimura	22–20, 19–21, 12–21	(silver) Runner-up
2022	Dubai Para Badminton International	Level 2	(Malaysia) Noor Azwan Noorlan	(South Korea) Choi Jung-man (South Korea) Kim Jung-jun	13–21, 12–21	(silver) Runner-up
2022	4 Nations Para Badminton International	Level 1	(Malaysia) Noor Azwan Noorlan	(Germany) Rick Hellmann (Germany) Thomas Wandschneider	20–22, 21–17, 21–11	(gold) Winner
2023	Western Australia Para Badminton International	Level 2	(Malaysia) Noor Azwan Noorlan	(South Korea) Kim Jung-jun (South Korea) Ryu Dong-hyun	14–21, 16–21	(silver) Runner-up

=== International tournaments (from 2011–2021) (1 title, 3 runners-up) ===
Men's singles WH1
Year	Tournament	Opponent	Score	Result
2018	Dubai Para Badminton International	(France) David Toupé	21–19, 13–21, 13–21	(silver) Runner-up
2021	Dubai Para Badminton International	(France) David Toupé	23–21, 21–13	(gold) Winner
2021	Spanish Para Badminton International	(South Korea) Lee Dong-seop	13–21, 16–21	(silver) Runner-up

Men's doubles WH1–WH2
Year	Tournament	Partner	Opponent	Score	Result
2018	Dubai Para Badminton International	(Malaysia) Madzlan Saibon	(Hong Kong) Chan Ho Yuen (France) David Toupé	11–21, 23–21, 21–23	(silver) Runner-up
