= Man-Kei To =

Belgian para-badminton player

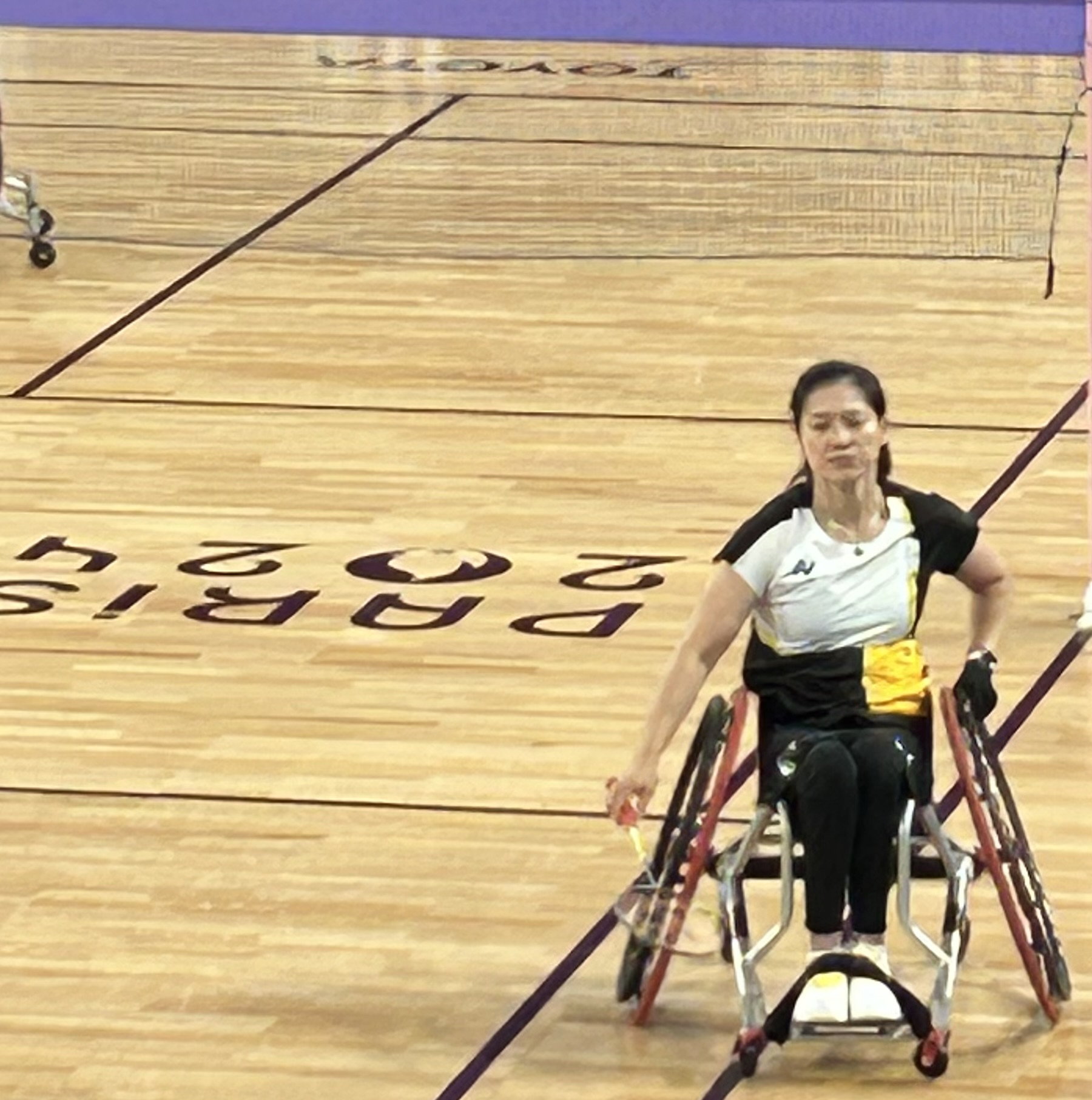
- Man-Kei To at the Paris 2024 Paralympics

Personal information
- Born: 25 August 1986 (age 40) Ninove, Belgium

Sport
- Country: Belgium
- Sport: Badminton
- BWF profile
Medal record
Para badminton
Representing Belgium
World Championships
Silver medal – second place	2022 Tokyo	Women's doubles
Bronze medal – third place	2024 Pattaya	Women's singles
Bronze medal – third place	2026 Manama	Mixed doubles
European Para Championships
Gold medal – first place	2023 Rotterdam	Singles WH1
Silver medal – second place	2023 Rotterdam	Doubles WH1-2
European Championships
Silver medal – second place	2018 Rodez	Doubles WH1-2
Bronze medal – third place	2018 Rodez	Singles WH1
Bronze medal – third place	2018 Rodez	Mixed doubles WH1-2

Man-Kei To (born 25 August 1986) is a Belgian para-badminton player who competes in international badminton competitions. She is a European champion and a World bronze medalist in the singles. She is also a silver medalist in the women's doubles with Turkish badminton player Emine Seçkin at the 2022 BWF Para-Badminton World Championships in Tokyo, Japan and a bronze medalist in the mixed doubles with Chilean player Jaime Aránguiz at the 2026 BWF Para-Badminton World Championships in Manama, Bahrein.

Man-Kei To was involved in a serious traffic accident in 2007 and had a spinal cord injury.

== Achievements ==
=== World Championships ===
Women's singles WH1
Year	Venue	Opponent	Score	Result
2024	Pattaya Exhibition and Convention Hall; Pattaya, Thailand	(Thailand) Sujirat Pookkham	12–21, 21–14, 11–21	Bronze

Women's doubles WH1–WH2
Year	Venue	Partner	Opponent	Score	Result
2022	Yoyogi National Gymnasium; Tokyo, Japan	(Turkey) Emine Seçkin	(Japan) Sarina Satomi (Japan) Yuma Yamazaki	11–21, 15–21	Silver

Mixed doubles WH1–WH2
Year	Venue	Partner	Opponent	Score	Result
2026	Isa Sports City; Manama, Bahrein	(Chile) Jaime Aránguiz	(India) Prem Kumar Ale (Japan) Alphia James	14–21, 15–21	Bronze
