= Prem Kumar Ale =

Indian para badminton player (born 1987)

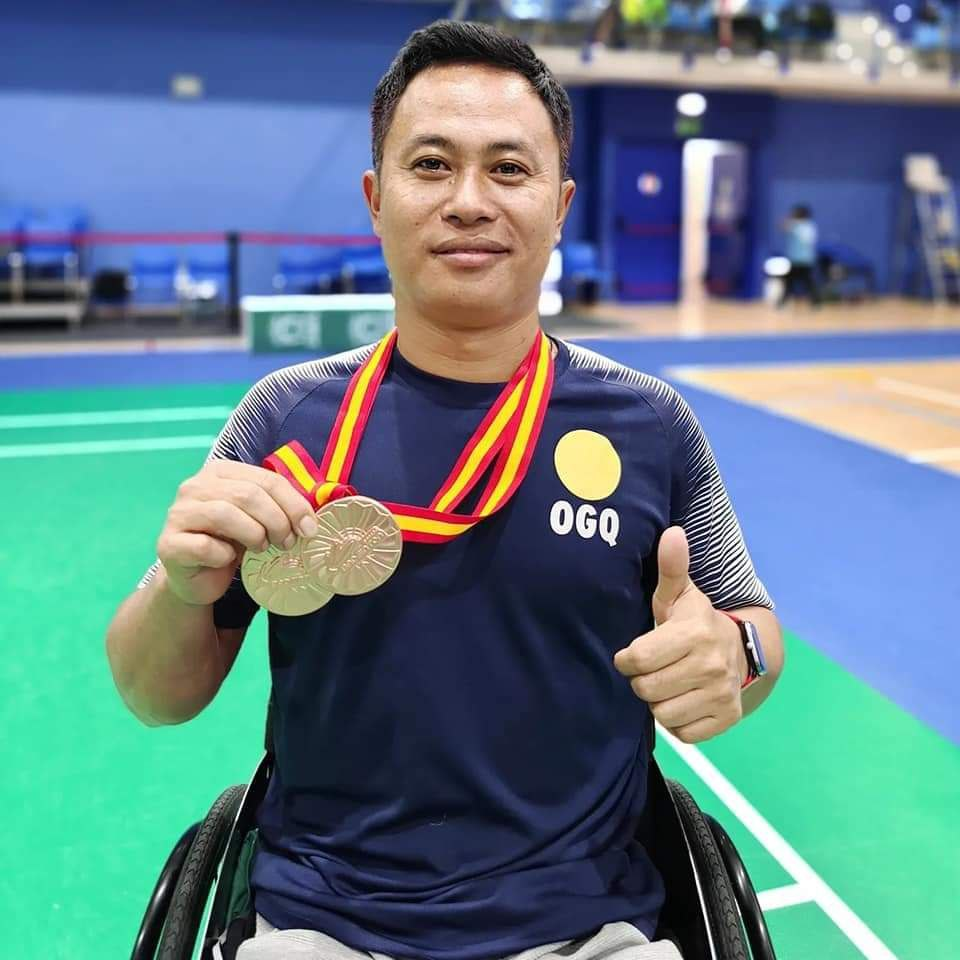

Personal information
- Born: 26 September 1987 (age 39) Maharashtra, India
- Height: 5 ft 5 in (165 cm)
- Weight: 55 kg (121 lb)

Sport
- Country: India
- Sport: Badminton
- Coached by: Aniket Singh Mehra & Gaurav Khanna

Men's singles WH1 Men's doubles WH1–WH2 Mixed doubles WH1–WH2
- Highest ranking: 9 (MS 6 November 2022); 3 (MD with Abu Hubaida 25 May 2022); 1 (XD with Alphia James 9 November 2025)
- Current ranking: 12 (MS); 6 (MD with Abu Hubaida); 4(XD Alphia James) (7 May 2026)
Medal record
Men's para-badminton
Representing India
World Championships
Silver medal – second place	2026 Manama	Mixed doubles

Prem Kumar Ale (born 26 September 1987) is an Indian ex-army soldier and a professional para badminton player. He made his international debut in 2014. In 2018, he became the national champion of men's singles and men's doubles with his doubles partner Abu Hubaida.

In 2019, he defeated the top-seeded Thomas Wandschneider in the BWF Para Badminton World Championships. He also won a gold medal at the Dubai Para Badminton International in 2021.

== Achievements ==
=== BWF Para Badminton World Circuit (4 titles, 3 runners-up) ===
The BWF Para Badminton World Circuit – Grade 2, Level 1, 2 and 3 tournaments has been sanctioned by the Badminton World Federation from 2022.

Men's singles WH1
Year	Tournament	Level	Opponent	Score	Result
2022	Brazil Para Badminton International	Level 2	(Japan) Hiroshi Murayama	18–21, 14–21	(silver) Runner-up
2024	French Para Badminton International	Level 2	(Italy) Yuri Ferrigno	23–21, 15–21, 21–13	(gold) Winner

Men's doubles WH1–WH2
Year	Tournament	Level	Partner	Opponent	Score	Result
2023	Brazil Para Badminton International	Level 2	(India) Abu Hubaida	(Japan) Daiki Kajiwara (Japan) Hiroshi Murayama	3–21, 17–21	(silver) Runner-up
2024	French Para Badminton International	Level 2	(India) Abu Hubaida	(Spain) Ignacio Fernández (Spain) Francisco Motero	21–15, 21–18	(gold) Winner

Mixed doubles WH1–WH2
Year	Tournament	Level	Partner	Opponent	Score	Result
2023	Bahrain Para Badminton International	Level 2	(Turkey) Emine Seçkin	(Hong Kong) Chan Ho Yuen (Belgium) To Man-kei	18–21, 19–21	(silver) Runner-up
2023	Canada Para Badminton International	Level 1	(Turkey) Emine Seçkin	(Chile) Jaime Aránguiz (Belgium) To Man-kei	21–13, 21–18	(gold) Winner
2024	French Para Badminton International	Level 1	(Turkey) Emine Seçkin	(Brazil) Marcelo Alves Conceição (Australia) Mischa Ginns	21–7, 21–7	(gold) Winner

=== International tournaments (from 2011–2021) (2 titles, 3 runners-up) ===
Men's doubles WH1–WH2
Year	Tournament	Partner	Opponent	Score	Result
2021	Dubai Para Badminton International	(India) Abu Hubaida	(France) Thomas Jakobs (France) David Toupé	13–21, 13–21	(silver) Runner-up
2021	Uganda Para Badminton International	(India) Abu Hubaida	(Germany) Rick Hellmann (Germany) Thomas Wandschneider	21–23, 19–21	(silver) Runner-up

Mixed doubles WH1–WH2
Year	Tournament	Partner	Opponent	Score	Result
2020	Brazil Para Badminton International	(Russia) Tatiana Gureeva	(China) Yang Tong (China) Li Hongyan	15–21, 10–21	(silver) Runner-up
2020	Peru Para Badminton International	(Russia) Tatiana Gureeva	(India) Abu Hubaida (Switzerland) Cynthia Mathez	21–9, 21–12	(gold) Winner
2021	Dubai Para Badminton International	(Russia) Tatiana Gureeva	(Switzerland) Luca Olgiati (Switzerland) Karin Suter-Erath	21–11, 21–18	(gold) Winner
