= Badminton at the 2020 Summer Paralympics – Men's singles WH1 =

Men's singles WH1 at the XVI Paralympic Games
- Venue: Yoyogi National Gymnasium
- Dates: 1–4 September 2021
- Competitors: 9 from 6 nations

Medalists
1st place, gold medalist(s)		Qu Zimo	China
2nd place, silver medalist(s)		Lee Sam-seop	South Korea
3rd place, bronze medalist(s)		Lee Dong-seop	South Korea

The men's singles WH1 tournament at the 2020 Summer Paralympics in Tokyo took place between 1 and 4 September 2021 at Yoyogi National Gymnasium.

== Seeds ==
These were the seeds for this event:

1. Lee Dong-seop (KOR) (bronze medalist)
2. Qu Zimo (CHN) (gold medalist)
3. Lee Sam-seop (KOR) (silver medalist)

== Group stage ==
The draw of the group stage revealed on 26 August 2021. The group stage was played from 1 to 3 September. The top two winners of each group advanced to the knockout rounds.

=== Group A ===
Pos	Team	Pld	W	L	GF	GA	GD	PF	PA	PD	Pts	Qualification
1	Lee Dong-seop (KOR)	2	2	0	4	1	+3	103	94	+9	2	Advance to semi-finals
2	Jakarin Homhual (THA)	2	1	1	2	3	−1	96	96	0	1	Advance to quarter-finals
3	Thomas Wandschneider (GER)	2	0	2	2	4	−2	109	118	−9	0	

Source: TOCOG

Date	Time	Player 1	Score	Player 2	Set 1	Set 2	Set 3
1 Sep	20:40	Lee Dong-seop (South Korea)	2–0	(Thailand) Jakarin Homhual	23–21	21–16	
2 Sep	15:20	Thomas Wandschneider (Germany)	1–2	(Thailand) Jakarin Homhual	19–21	21–17	12–21
3 Sep	11:00	Lee Dong-seop (South Korea)	2–1	(Germany) Thomas Wandschneider	17–21	21–19	21–17

=== Group B ===
Pos	Team	Pld	W	L	GF	GA	GD	PF	PA	PD	Pts	Qualification
1	Hiroshi Murayama (JPN) (H)	2	2	0	4	1	+3	99	66	+33	2	Advance to quarter-finals
2	Lee Sam-seop (KOR)	2	1	1	3	2	+1	93	88	+5	1	Advance to quarter-finals
3	Young-chin Mi (GER)	2	0	2	0	4	−4	46	84	−38	0	

Source: TOCOG
(H) Host

Date	Time	Player 1	Score	Player 2	Set 1	Set 2	Set 3
1 Sep	20:40	Lee Sam-seop (South Korea)	1–2	(Japan) Hiroshi Murayama	21–15	13–21	17–21
2 Sep	16:00	Young-chin Mi (Germany)	0–2	(Japan) Hiroshi Murayama	8–21	7–21	
3 Sep	11:40	Lee Sam-seop (South Korea)	2–0	(Germany) Young-chin Mi	21–18	21–13	

=== Group C ===
Pos	Team	Pld	W	L	GF	GA	GD	PF	PA	PD	Pts	Qualification
1	Qu Zimo (CHN)	2	2	0	4	0	+4	84	45	+39	2	Advance to semi-finals
2	Osamu Nagashima (JPN) (H)	2	1	1	2	2	0	63	60	+3	1	Advance to quarter-finals
3	David Toupé (FRA)	2	0	2	0	4	−4	42	84	−42	0	

Source: TOCOG
(H) Host

Date	Time	Player 1	Score	Player 2	Set 1	Set 2	Set 3
1 Sep	21:20	Qu Zimo (China)	2–0	(Japan) Osamu Nagashima	21–9	21–12	
2 Sep	14:40	David Toupé (France)	0–2	(Japan) Osamu Nagashima	6–21	12–21	
3 Sep	11:00	Qu Zimo (China)	2–0	(France) David Toupé	21–11	21–13	

== Finals ==
The knockout stage was played from 3 to 4 September.

Quarter-finals
B2	Lee Sam-seop (KOR)	21	21
A2	Jakarin Homhual (THA)	14	16
C2	Osamu Nagashima (JPN)	15	16
B1	Hiroshi Murayama (JPN)	21	21

Semi-finals
A1	Lee Dong-seop (KOR)	21	7	20
B2	Lee Sam-seop (KOR)	12	21	22
B1	Hiroshi Murayama (JPN)	16	11
C1	Qu Zimo (CHN)	21	21

Gold medal match
B2	Lee Sam-seop (KOR) (silver)	6	6^{r}
C1	Qu Zimo (CHN) (gold)	21	11
Bronze medal match
A1	Lee Dong-seop (KOR) (bronze)	22	17	21
B1	Hiroshi Murayama (JPN)	20	21	14
