= Dumnern Junthong =

Thai para-badminton player (born 1975)

Personal information
- Born: 5 May 1975 (age 51) Surat Thani, Thailand

Sport
- Country: Thailand
- Sport: Badminton
- Handedness: Right

Men's singles WH2 Men's doubles WH1–WH2 Mixed doubles WH1–WH2
- Highest ranking: 12 (MS 6 April 2019); 4 (MD with Jakarin Homhual 1 January 2019); 16 (XD with Sujirat Pookkham 1 January 2019)
- Current ranking: 19 (MS); 9 (MD with Jakarin Homhual) (17 September 2024)
Medal record
Men's para-badminton
Representing Thailand
World Championships
Gold medal – first place	2009 Seoul	Mixed doubles
Silver medal – second place	2009 Seoul	Men's doubles
Bronze medal – third place	2013 Dortmund	Mixed doubles
Bronze medal – third place	2015 Stoke Mandeville	Mixed doubles
Bronze medal – third place	2017 Ulsan	Men's doubles
Bronze medal – third place	2024 Pattaya	Men's doubles
World Abilitysport Games
Gold medal – first place	2023 Nakhon Ratchasima	Men's singles
Asian Para Games
Bronze medal – third place	2014 Incheon	Men's singles
Bronze medal – third place	2014 Incheon	Men's doubles
Bronze medal – third place	2014 Incheon	Mixed doubles
Bronze medal – third place	2018 Jakarta	Men's doubles
Asian Championships
Bronze medal – third place	2012 Yeoju	Men's singles
Bronze medal – third place	2016 Beijing	Men's doubles
ASEAN Para Games
Gold medal – first place	2008 Nakhon Ratchasima	Mixed doubles
Gold medal – first place	2009 Kuala Lumpur	Mixed doubles
Gold medal – first place	2011 Surakarta	Men's doubles
Gold medal – first place	2015 Singapore	Men's doubles
Silver medal – second place	2017 Kuala Lumpur	Men's doubles
Silver medal – second place	2022 Surakarta	Mixed doubles
Silver medal – second place	2023 Cambodia	Men's doubles
Silver medal – second place	2023 Cambodia	Men's doubles
Bronze medal – third place	2008 Nakhon Ratchasima	Men's doubles
Bronze medal – third place	2009 Kuala Lumpur	Men's singles
Bronze medal – third place	2009 Kuala Lumpur	Men's doubles
Bronze medal – third place	2011 Surakarta	Men's singles
Bronze medal – third place	2017 Kuala Lumpur	Men's singles
Bronze medal – third place	2023 Cambodia	Men's singles

Dumnern Junthong (Thai: ดำเนิน จันทร์ทอง; born 5 May 1975) is a Thai para-badminton player. In 2021, he reached the semi-finals of the men's doubles WH1–WH2 event at the 2020 Summer Paralympics in Tokyo with his partner, Jakarin Homhual. The duo finished in fourth place.

== Achievements ==
=== World Championships ===
Men's doubles WH1–WH2
Year	Venue	Partner	Opponent	Score	Result
2009	Olympic Fencing Gymnasium; Seoul, South Korea	(Thailand) Jakarin Homhual	(South Korea) Kim Sung-hun (South Korea) Shim Jae-yeol	8–21, 11–21	Silver
2013	Helmut-Körnig-Halle; Dortmund, Germany	(Vietnam) Trương Ngọc Bình	(South Korea) Kim Jung-jun (South Korea) Lee Sam-seop	11–21, 7–21	Bronze
2017	Dongchun Gymnasium; Ulsan, South Korea	(Thailand) Jakarin Homhual	(South Korea) Kim Jung-jun (South Korea) Lee Sam-seop	16–21, 13–21	Bronze
2024	Pattaya Exhibition and Convention Hall, Pattaya, Thailand	(Thailand) Jakarin Homhual	(Malaysia) Noor Azwan Noorlan (Malaysia) Muhammad Ikhwan Ramli	19–21, 17–21	Bronze

Mixed doubles WH1–WH2

Year	Venue	Partner	Opponent	Score	Result
2009 (Note: This tournament uses a round robin system.)	Olympic Fencing Gymnasium, Seoul, South Korea	(Thailand) Amnouy Wetwithan	(Thailand) Jakarin Homhual (Thailand) Sujirat Pookkham	21–19, 21–14	Gold
2009	Olympic Fencing Gymnasium, Seoul, South Korea	(Thailand) Amnouy Wetwithan	(South Korea) Shim Jae-yeol (South Korea) Kim Yun-sim	21–19, 22–20	Gold
2009	Olympic Fencing Gymnasium, Seoul, South Korea	(Thailand) Amnouy Wetwithan	Amir Levi; Nina Gorodetzky	21–17, 21–17	Gold
2009	Olympic Fencing Gymnasium, Seoul, South Korea	(Thailand) Amnouy Wetwithan	(South Korea) Kim Sung-hun (South Korea) Lee Sun-ae	21–12, 21–16	Gold
2015	Stoke Mandeville Stadium, Stoke Mandeville, England	(Thailand) Sujirat Pookkham	(Thailand) Jakarin Homhual (Thailand) Amnouy Wetwithan	14–21, 15–21	(silver) Bronze

=== World Abilitysport Games ===
Men's singles WH2

Year	Venue	Opponent	Score	Result
2023	Terminal 21 Korat Hall, Nakhon Ratchasima, Thailand	(Thailand) Aphichat Sumpradit	21–11, 21–9	Gold

=== Asian Para Games ===
Men's singles WH2
Year	Venue	Opponent	Score	Result
2014	Gyeyang Gymnasium; Incheon, South Korea	(South Korea) Lee Sam-seop	16–21, 18–21	Bronze

Men's doubles WH1–WH2

Year	Venue	Partner	Opponent	Score	Result
2014	Gyeyang Gymnasium, Incheon, South Korea	(Thailand) Jakarin Homhual	(Japan) Osamu Nagashima (Japan) Seiji Yamami	21–10, 21–16	Bronze
2014	Gyeyang Gymnasium, Incheon, South Korea	(Thailand) Jakarin Homhual	(Vietnam) Trần Mai Anh (Vietnam) Trương Ngọc Bình	21–18, 21–13	Bronze
2014	Gyeyang Gymnasium, Incheon, South Korea	(Thailand) Jakarin Homhual	(South Korea) Choi Jung-man (South Korea) Kim Sung-hun	11–21, 12–21	Bronze
2014	Gyeyang Gymnasium, Incheon, South Korea	(Thailand) Jakarin Homhual	(South Korea) Kim Kyung-hoon (South Korea) Lee Sam-seop	13–21, 14–21	Bronze
2018	Istora Gelora Bung Karno, Jakarta, Indonesia	(Thailand) Jakarin Homhual	(South Korea) Kim Jung-jun (South Korea) Lee Dong-seop	13–21, 11–21	Bronze

Mixed doubles WH1–WH2
Year	Venue	Partner	Opponent	Score	Result
2014	Gyeyang Gymnasium; Incheon, South Korea	(Thailand) Sujirat Pookkham	(South Korea) Lee Sam-seop (South Korea) Lee Sun-ae	21–23, 11–21	Bronze

=== Asian Championships ===
Men's singles WH2
Year	Venue	Opponent	Score	Result
2012	Yeoju Sports Center, Yeoju, South Korea	(South Korea) Kim Sung-hun	12–21, 8–21	Bronze

Men's doubles WH1–WH2
Year	Venue	Partner	Opponent	Score	Result
2016	China Administration of Sport for Persons with Disabilities; Beijing, China	(Thailand) Jakarin Homhual	(South Korea) Kim Kyung-hoon (South Korea) Lee Dong-seop	8–21, 13–21	Bronze

=== ASEAN Para Games ===
Men's singles WH2
Year	Venue	Opponent	Score	Result
2009	Axiata Arena; Kuala Lumpur, Malaysia			Bronze
2011	Sritex Sports Arena; Surakarta, Indonesia	(Vietnam) Trương Ngọc Bình	21–16, 12–21, 11–21	Bronze
2017	Axiata Arena; Kuala Lumpur, Malaysia	(Malaysia) Madzlan Saibon	12–21, 8–21	Bronze
2023	Morodok Techo Badminton Hall; Phnom Penh, Cambodia	(Indonesia) Wiwin Andri	10–21, 14–21	Bronze

Men's doubles WH1–WH2

Year	Venue	Partner	Opponent	Score	Result
2008	Vongchavalitkul University Gymnasium, Nakhon Ratchasima, Thailand	(Thailand) Jakarin Homhual	(Thailand) Anuwat Sriboran (Thailand) Thean Thongloy	21–5, 21–16	Bronze
2008	Vongchavalitkul University Gymnasium, Nakhon Ratchasima, Thailand	(Thailand) Jakarin Homhual	(Malaysia) Mohd Fairuz Amjad Rohaizat (Malaysia) Madzlan Saibon	22–20, 18–21, 16–21	Bronze
2008	Vongchavalitkul University Gymnasium, Nakhon Ratchasima, Thailand	(Thailand) Jakarin Homhual	(Vietnam) Phạm Quang Nhuận (Vietnam) Vũ Văn Phú	21–9, 21–13	Bronze
2008	Vongchavalitkul University Gymnasium, Nakhon Ratchasima, Thailand	(Thailand) Jakarin Homhual	(Vietnam) Trần Mai Anh (Vietnam) Trương Ngọc Bình	16–21, 12–21	Bronze
2009	Axiata Arena, Kuala Lumpur, Malaysia	(Thailand) Jakarin Homhual			Bronze
2011	Sritex Sports Arena, Surakarta, Indonesia	(Thailand) Jakarin Homhual	(Malaysia) Madzlan Saibon (Malaysia) Zarim Marzuki	21–17, 21–19	Gold
2015	OCBC Arena, Singapore	(Thailand) Jakarin Homhual	(Thailand) Chatchai Kornpeekanok (Thailand) Aphichat Sumpradit	21–16, 21–16	Gold
2015	OCBC Arena, Singapore	(Thailand) Jakarin Homhual	(Malaysia) Mohd Firdaus Mohd Nadzar (Malaysia) Zarim Marzuki	14–21, 21–13, 21–16	Gold
2015	OCBC Arena, Singapore	(Thailand) Jakarin Homhual	(Malaysia) Mohd Yusof Rahim (Malaysia) Mohd Johari Saad	21–11, 21–13	Gold
2015	OCBC Arena, Singapore	(Thailand) Jakarin Homhual	(Vietnam) Trần Mai Anh (Vietnam) Trương Ngọc Bình	23–25, 21–13, 21–17	Gold
2017	Axiata Arena, Kuala Lumpur, Malaysia	(Thailand) Jakarin Homhual	(Malaysia) Muhammad Ikhwan Ramli (Malaysia) Madzlan Saibon	20–22, 19–21	Silver
2023	Morodok Techo Badminton Hall, Phnom Penh, Cambodia	(Thailand) Jakarin Homhual	(Malaysia) Noor Azwan Noorlan (Malaysia) Muhammad Ikhwan Ramli	21–14, 17–21, 9–21	Silver

Mixed doubles WH1–WH2

Year	Venue	Partner	Opponent	Score	Result
2008	Vongchavalitkul University Gymnasium, Nakhon Ratchasima, Thailand	(Thailand) Amnouy Wetwithan	(Thailand) Thean Thongloy (Thailand) Piyawan Thinjun	28–26, 21–15	Gold
2008	Vongchavalitkul University Gymnasium, Nakhon Ratchasima, Thailand	(Thailand) Amnouy Wetwithan	(Thailand) Jakarin Homhual (Thailand) Laong Hebkaew	22–20, 21–15	Gold
2008	Vongchavalitkul University Gymnasium, Nakhon Ratchasima, Thailand	(Thailand) Amnouy Wetwithan	(Vietnam) Trần Mai Anh (Vietnam) Nguyễn Thị Tố Nga	21–11, 21–19	Gold
2008	Vongchavalitkul University Gymnasium, Nakhon Ratchasima, Thailand	(Thailand) Amnouy Wetwithan	(Vietnam) Trương Ngọc Bình (Vietnam) Ứng Thị Phát Lợi	21–17, 13–21, 21–17	Gold
2009	Axiata Arena, Kuala Lumpur, Malaysia	(Thailand) Amnouy Wetwithan			Gold
2022	Edutorium Muhammadiyah University of Surakarta, Surakarta, Indonesia	(Thailand) Piyawan Thinjun	(Thailand) Chatchai Kornpeekanok (Thailand) Amnouy Wetwithan	13–21, 7–21	Silver
2022	Edutorium Muhammadiyah University of Surakarta, Surakarta, Indonesia	(Thailand) Piyawan Thinjun	(Philippines) Jestonie Librado Rosalita (Philippines) Paz Enano Lita	21–9, 21–8	Silver
2022	Edutorium Muhammadiyah University of Surakarta, Surakarta, Indonesia	(Thailand) Piyawan Thinjun	(Vietnam) Hoàng Mạnh Giang (Vietnam) Hoàng Thị Hồng Thảo	21–11, 21–12	Silver
2022	Edutorium Muhammadiyah University of Surakarta, Surakarta, Indonesia	(Thailand) Piyawan Thinjun	(Philippines) Joseph Garbo Asoque (Philippines) Violeta Kitongan Sapalit	21–10, 21–12	Silver
2023	Morodok Techo Badminton Hall, Phnom Penh, Cambodia	(Thailand) Sujirat Pookkham	(Vietnam) Hoàng Mạnh Giang (Vietnam) Hoàng Thị Hồng Thảo	21–6, 21–14	Silver
2023	Morodok Techo Badminton Hall, Phnom Penh, Cambodia	(Thailand) Sujirat Pookkham	(Thailand) Jakarin Homhual (Thailand) Amnouy Wetwithan	21–17, 19–21, 17–21	Silver

=== BWF Para Badminton World Circuit (1 runner-up) ===
The BWF Para Badminton World Circuit – Grade 2, Level 1, 2 and 3 tournaments has been sanctioned by the Badminton World Federation from 2022.

Men's doubles WH1–WH2
Year	Tournament	Level	Partner	Opponent	Score	Result
2023	Spanish Para-Badminton International II	Level 2	(Thailand) Jakarin Homhual	(Japan) Daiki Kajiwara (Japan) Hiroshi Murayama	8–21, 12–21	(silver) Runner-up

=== International tournaments (2011–2021) (3 runners-up) ===
Men's doubles WH1–WH2

Year	Tournament	Partner	Opponent	Score	Result
2012	Spanish Para-Badminton International	(Thailand) Jakarin Homhual	(Macau) Ip Chi Keong (India) Madasu Srinivas Rao	21–5, 21–8	(silver) Runner-up
2012	Spanish Para-Badminton International	(Thailand) Jakarin Homhual	(Switzerland) Antonio Pires de Miranda (Switzerland) Walter Rauber	21–11, 21–16	(silver) Runner-up
2012	Spanish Para-Badminton International	(Thailand) Jakarin Homhual	(South Korea) Kim Sung-hun (South Korea) Shim Jae-yeol	16–21, 9–21	(silver) Runner-up
2012	Spanish Para-Badminton International	(Thailand) Jakarin Homhual	(France) Pascal Barrillon (France) Francois Nalborczyk	21–6, 21–6	(silver) Runner-up

Mixed doubles WH1–WH2
Year	Tournament	Partner	Opponent	Score	Result
2016	Indonesia Para-Badminton International	(Thailand) Sujirat Pookkham	(Thailand) Jakarin Homhual (Thailand) Amnouy Wetwithan	14–21, 28–26, 17–21	(silver) Runner-up
2017	Irish Para-Badminton International	(Thailand) Sujirat Pookkham	(Thailand) Jakarin Homhual (Thailand) Amnouy Wetwithan	9–21, 20–22	(silver) Runner-up
