= Asian Para-Badminton Championships =

Badminton championships

- Current season, competition or edition: 2025 Asian Para-Badminton Championships
- Founder: Para Badminton World Federation (now part of the BWF)
- First season: 2004

The Asian Para-Badminton Championships is a tournament organized by the Para Badminton World Federation (PBWF) which has now merged with the BWF. This tournament is hosted to crown the best para-badminton players in Asia.

The inaugural edition of the tournament was hosted in Yeoju, South Korea in 2012.

== Championships ==
=== Individual championships ===
The table below states all the host cities (and their countries) of the Asia Championships. South Korea hosted the 2012 edition of the championships and hosted a total of 18 events. China hosted the championships in 2016 and won a total of 8 gold medals in the championships.

Year	Number	Host City	Host Country	Events
2004	1	Kuala Lumpur	Malaysia	12
2008	2	Bangalore	India	18
2012	3	Yeoju	South Korea	18
2016	4	Beijing	China	21
~~2020~~	~~5~~	Cancelled		
2025	5	Nakhon Ratchasima	Thailand	22
2027	6	Nakhon Ratchasima	Thailand	

== Medal table (2012–2025) ==
Rank	Nation	Gold	Silver	Bronze	Total
1	China (CHN)	16	12	17	45
2	South Korea (KOR)	11.5	13	20	44.5
3	Malaysia (MAS)	9	4	5.5	18.5
4	India (IND)	7.5	11.5	21.5	40.5
5	Japan (JPN)	5	7	18.5	30.5
6	Indonesia (INA)	4	4	3.5	11.5
7	Thailand (THA)	3.5	6	18	27.5
8	Chinese Taipei (TPE)	2	0	7	9
9	Vietnam (VIE)	2	0	1	3
10	Hong Kong (HKG)	0.5	1	4.5	6
11	Singapore (SGP)	0	2	0	2
12	Sri Lanka (SRI)	0	0.5	1	1.5
13	Philippines (PHI)	0	0	1	1
14	Macau (MAC)	0	0	0.5	0.5
Totals (14 entries)		61	61	119	241

== Past winners ==
=== 2012 Yeoju ===
Event	Gold	Silver	Bronze
Men's singles WH1	(South Korea) Kim Jung-jun	(South Korea) Lee Sam-seop	(South Korea) Lee Dong-seop
Men's singles WH1	(South Korea) Kim Jung-jun	(South Korea) Lee Sam-seop	(Thailand) Jakarin Homhual
Men's singles WH2	(South Korea) Kim Kyung-hoon	(South Korea) Kim Sung-hun	(South Korea) Shim Jae-yul
Men's singles WH2	(South Korea) Kim Kyung-hoon	(South Korea) Kim Sung-hun	(Thailand) Dumnern Junthong
Men's singles SL3	(Vietnam) Phạm Đức Trung	(South Korea) Kim Chang-man	(Chinese Taipei) Huang Hsing-chih
Men's singles SL3	(Vietnam) Phạm Đức Trung	(South Korea) Kim Chang-man	(Japan) Toshiaki Suenaga
Men's singles SL4	(Chinese Taipei) Lin Cheng-che	(Malaysia) Hairol Fozi Saaba	(Chinese Taipei) Yeh En-chuan
Men's singles SL4	(Chinese Taipei) Lin Cheng-che	(Malaysia) Hairol Fozi Saaba	(India) Anand Kumar Boregowda
Men's singles SU5	(Malaysia) Cheah Liek Hou	(Singapore) Tay Wei Ming	(Japan) Hironobu Kawabata
Men's singles SU5	(Malaysia) Cheah Liek Hou	(Singapore) Tay Wei Ming	(Japan) Gen Shogaki
Men's doubles WH1	(South Korea) Kim Jung-jun (South Korea) Lee Sam-seop	(Thailand) Jakarin Homhual (Thailand) Kornpeekanok Chatchai	(Japan) Osamu Nagashima (Japan) Tsutomu Shimada
Men's doubles WH1	(South Korea) Kim Jung-jun (South Korea) Lee Sam-seop	(Thailand) Jakarin Homhual (Thailand) Kornpeekanok Chatchai	(Chinese Taipei) Fang Chih-tsung (Chinese Taipei) Ong Yu-yu
Men's doubles WH2	(South Korea) Lee Dong-seop (South Korea) Shim Jae-yul	(South Korea) Kim Kyung-hoon (South Korea) Kim Sung-hun	(Vietnam) Trần Mai Anh (Vietnam) Trương Ngọc Bình
Men's doubles WH2	(South Korea) Lee Dong-seop (South Korea) Shim Jae-yul	(South Korea) Kim Kyung-hoon (South Korea) Kim Sung-hun	(Hong Kong) Chan Ho Yuen (Macau) Ip Chi Keong
Men's doubles SL3	(Vietnam) Hoàng Phạm Thắng (Vietnam) Phạm Đức Trung	(Japan) Masanori Sato (Japan) Toshiaki Suenaga	(Chinese Taipei) Chang Yu-yung (Chinese Taipei) Huang Hsing-chih
Men's doubles SL3	(Vietnam) Hoàng Phạm Thắng (Vietnam) Phạm Đức Trung	(Japan) Masanori Sato (Japan) Toshiaki Suenaga	(Malaysia) Muhammad Huzairi Abdul Malek (Malaysia) Yau Tiam Ann
Men's doubles SL4	(Chinese Taipei) Lin Cheng-che (Chinese Taipei) Lin Yung-chang	(Malaysia) Zaidi Omar (Malaysia) Hairol Fozi Saaba	(India) Anand Kumar Boregowda (India) Indrajit Pal
Men's doubles SL4	(Chinese Taipei) Lin Cheng-che (Chinese Taipei) Lin Yung-chang	(Malaysia) Zaidi Omar (Malaysia) Hairol Fozi Saaba	(South Korea) Baek Dong-gyu (South Korea) Byeon Jeong-bae
Men's doubles SU5	(Malaysia) Cheah Liek Hou (Malaysia) Suhalli Laiman	(Singapore) Kelvin Pung (Singapore) Tay Wei Ming	(Japan) Hironobu Kawabata (Japan) Gen Shogaki
Men's doubles SU5	(Malaysia) Cheah Liek Hou (Malaysia) Suhalli Laiman	(Singapore) Kelvin Pung (Singapore) Tay Wei Ming	(South Korea) Kim Gi-yeon (South Korea) Kim Sam-seop
Women's singles WH1	(Thailand) Sujirat Pookkham	(South Korea) Lee Mi-ok	(South Korea) Son Ok-cha
Women's singles WH1	(Thailand) Sujirat Pookkham	(South Korea) Lee Mi-ok	(Thailand) Piyawan Thinjun
Women's singles WH2	(South Korea) Lee Sun-ae	(South Korea) Kim Yun-sim	(Japan) Yoko Egami
Women's singles WH2	(South Korea) Lee Sun-ae	(South Korea) Kim Yun-sim	(Japan) Rie Ogura
Women's singles SL3–SU5	(Japan) Mamiko Toyoda	(Japan) Kaede Kameyama	(Thailand) Yodpa Sudsaifon
Women's singles SL3–SU5	(Japan) Mamiko Toyoda	(Japan) Kaede Kameyama	(Thailand) Nipada Saensupa
Women's doubles WH1–WH2	(South Korea) Kim Yun-sim (South Korea) Lee Sun-ae	(Thailand) Sujirat Pookkham (Thailand) Piyawan Thinjun	(South Korea) Lee Mi-ok (South Korea) Son Ok-cha
Women's doubles WH1–WH2	(South Korea) Kim Yun-sim (South Korea) Lee Sun-ae	(Thailand) Sujirat Pookkham (Thailand) Piyawan Thinjun	(Japan) Yoko Egami (Japan) Rie Ogura
Women's doubles SL3–SU5	(Japan) Mamiko Toyoda (Japan) Kaede Kameyama	(Thailand) Wandee Kamtam (Thailand) Yodpa Sudsaifon	(Thailand) Nipada Saensupa (Thailand) Chanida Srinavakul
Women's doubles SL3–SU5	(Japan) Mamiko Toyoda (Japan) Kaede Kameyama	(Thailand) Wandee Kamtam (Thailand) Yodpa Sudsaifon	(Malaysia) Nabilah Ahmat Sharif (Hong Kong) Ng Lai Ling
Mixed doubles WH1	(South Korea) Kim Jung-jun (South Korea) Son Ok-cha	(South Korea) Lee Sam-seop (South Korea) Lee Mi-ok	(Thailand) Jakarin Homhual (Thailand) Sujirat Pookkham
Mixed doubles WH1	(South Korea) Kim Jung-jun (South Korea) Son Ok-cha	(South Korea) Lee Sam-seop (South Korea) Lee Mi-ok	(Thailand) Kornpeekanok Chatchai (Thailand) Piyawan Thinjun
Mixed doubles WH2	(South Korea) Kim Sung-hun (South Korea) Lee Sun-ae	(South Korea) Kim Kyung-hoon (South Korea) Kim Yun-sim	(Japan) Osamu Nagashima (Japan) Yoko Egami
Mixed doubles WH2	(South Korea) Kim Sung-hun (South Korea) Lee Sun-ae	(South Korea) Kim Kyung-hoon (South Korea) Kim Yun-sim	(Japan) Tsutomu Shimada (Japan) Rie Ogura
Mixed doubles SL3–SU5	(Malaysia) Cheah Liek Hou (Malaysia) Nabilah Ahmat Sharif	(Japan) Hironobu Kawabata (Japan) Mamiko Toyoda	(Japan) Gen Shogaki (Japan) Kaede Kameyama
Mixed doubles SL3–SU5	(Malaysia) Cheah Liek Hou (Malaysia) Nabilah Ahmat Sharif	(Japan) Hironobu Kawabata (Japan) Mamiko Toyoda	(Thailand) Chawarat Kitichokwattana (Thailand) Chanida Srinavakul

=== 2016 Beijing ===
Event	Gold	Silver	Bronze
Men's singles WH1	(South Korea) Lee Sam-seop	(South Korea) Lee Dong-seop	(China) Chen Linting
Men's singles WH1	(South Korea) Lee Sam-seop	(South Korea) Lee Dong-seop	(China) Qu Zimo
Men's singles WH2	(South Korea) Kim Jung-jun	(China) Mai Jianpeng	(Hong Kong) Chan Ho Yuen
Men's singles WH2	(South Korea) Kim Jung-jun	(China) Mai Jianpeng	(Malaysia) Madzlan Saibon
Men's singles SL3	(India) Manoj Sarkar	(China) Chen Xiaoyu	(Japan) Daisuke Fujihara
Men's singles SL3	(India) Manoj Sarkar	(China) Chen Xiaoyu	(India) Pramod Bhagat
Men's singles SL4	(India) Suhas Lalinakere Yathiraj	(Indonesia) Hary Susanto	(Malaysia) Bakri Omar
Men's singles SL4	(India) Suhas Lalinakere Yathiraj	(Indonesia) Hary Susanto	(South Korea) Shin Kyung-hwan
Men's singles SU5	(Indonesia) Suryo Nugroho	(Japan) Taiyo Imai	(Indonesia) Oddie Listyanto Putra
Men's singles SU5	(Indonesia) Suryo Nugroho	(Japan) Taiyo Imai	(Malaysia) Cheah Liek Hou
Men's singles SH6	(Malaysia) Didin Taresoh	(Hong Kong) Wong Chun Yim	(Thailand) Bunthan Yaemmali
Men's singles SH6	(Malaysia) Didin Taresoh	(Hong Kong) Wong Chun Yim	(India) Mark Joseph Dharmai
Men's doubles WH1–WH2	(South Korea) Kim Kyung-hoon (South Korea) Lee Dong-seop	(South Korea) Kim Jung-jun (South Korea) Lee Sam-seop	(Hong Kong) Chan Ho Yuen (Japan) Osamu Nagashima
Men's doubles WH1–WH2	(South Korea) Kim Kyung-hoon (South Korea) Lee Dong-seop	(South Korea) Kim Jung-jun (South Korea) Lee Sam-seop	(Thailand) Jakarin Homhual (Thailand) Dumnern Junthong
Men's doubles SL3–SL4	(Indonesia) Ukun Rukaendi (Indonesia) Hary Susanto	(Malaysia) Muhammad Huzairi Abdul Malek (Malaysia) Bakri Omar	(India) Anand Boregowda (India) Manoj Sarkar
Men's doubles SL3–SL4	(Indonesia) Ukun Rukaendi (Indonesia) Hary Susanto	(Malaysia) Muhammad Huzairi Abdul Malek (Malaysia) Bakri Omar	(India) Pramod Bhagat (India) Sukant Kadam
Men's doubles SU5	(Malaysia) Cheah Liek Hou (Malaysia) Hairol Fozi Saaba	(Indonesia) Suryo Nugroho (Indonesia) Oddie Listyanto Putra	(Japan) Kohei Obara (Japan) Tetsuo Ura
Men's doubles SU5	(Malaysia) Cheah Liek Hou (Malaysia) Hairol Fozi Saaba	(Indonesia) Suryo Nugroho (Indonesia) Oddie Listyanto Putra	(South Korea) Kim Gi-yeon (South Korea) Shin Kyung-hwan
Men's doubles SH6	(India) Mark Joseph Dharmai (Hong Kong) Wong Chun Yim	(China) Luo Guangliang (China) Yan Huide	(China) Liang Hai (China) Yang Jinquan
Men's doubles SH6	(India) Mark Joseph Dharmai (Hong Kong) Wong Chun Yim	(China) Luo Guangliang (China) Yan Huide	(Japan) Kiyoshi Asai (Japan) Naoto Mimura
Women's singles WH1	(China) Li Hongyan	(China) Wang Ping	(South Korea) Son Ok-cha
Women's singles WH1	(China) Li Hongyan	(China) Wang Ping	(Thailand) Sujirat Pookkham
Women's singles WH2	(China) Liu Yutong	(Thailand) Amnouy Wetwithan	(South Korea) Kim Yun-sim
Women's singles WH2	(China) Liu Yutong	(Thailand) Amnouy Wetwithan	(China) Yang Fan
Women's singles SL3	(India) Parul Parmar	(Thailand) Wandee Kamtam	(India) Manasi Girishchandra Joshi
Women's singles SL3	(India) Parul Parmar	(Thailand) Wandee Kamtam	(Japan) Asami Yamada
Women's singles SL4	(Malaysia) Nursyazwani Shahrom	(India) Chiranjita Bharali	(China) Ou Haishi
Women's singles SU5	(China) Yang Qiuxia	(Japan) Ayako Suzuki	(China) Cheng Hefang
Women's singles SU5	(China) Yang Qiuxia	(Japan) Ayako Suzuki	(China) Su Kunrong
Women's singles SH6	(China) Li Fengmei	(China) Lin Shuangbao	(Sri Lanka) Randika Doling
Women's singles SH6	(China) Li Fengmei	(China) Lin Shuangbao	(Thailand) Kannikon Yaemmali
Women's doubles WH1–WH2	(China) Li Hongyan (China) Yang Fan	(Thailand) Sujirat Pookkham (Thailand) Amnouy Wetwithan	(Japan) Etsuko Kobayashi (Japan) Yuma Yamazaki
Women's doubles WH1–WH2	(China) Li Hongyan (China) Yang Fan	(Thailand) Sujirat Pookkham (Thailand) Amnouy Wetwithan	(South Korea) Kim Yun-sim (South Korea) Son Ok-cha
Women's doubles SL3–SU5	(China) Cheng Hefang (China) Ma Huihui	(Japan) Akiko Sugino (Japan) Asami Yamada	(India) Chiranjita Bharali (India) Manasi Girishchandra Joshi
Women's doubles SL3–SU5	(China) Cheng Hefang (China) Ma Huihui	(Japan) Akiko Sugino (Japan) Asami Yamada	(India) Parul Parmar (Indonesia) Khalimatus Sadiyah
Mixed doubles WH1–WH2	(Thailand) Jakarin Homhual (Thailand) Amnouy Wetwithan	(South Korea) Lee Dong-seop (South Korea) Lee Sun-ae	(South Korea) Kim Kyung-hoon (South Korea) Kim Seung-suk
Mixed doubles WH1–WH2	(Thailand) Jakarin Homhual (Thailand) Amnouy Wetwithan	(South Korea) Lee Dong-seop (South Korea) Lee Sun-ae	(South Korea) Lee Sam-seop (South Korea) Kim Yun-sim
Mixed doubles SL3–SU5	(Japan) Toshiaki Suenaga (Japan) Akiko Sugino	(China) Ou Wei (China) Cheng Hefang	(Japan) Tetsuo Ura (Japan) Asami Yamada
Mixed doubles SL3–SU5	(Japan) Toshiaki Suenaga (Japan) Akiko Sugino	(China) Ou Wei (China) Cheng Hefang	(China) Gao Yuyang (China) Ma Huihui
Mixed doubles SH6	(China) Luo Guangliang (China) Li Fengmei	(India) Mark Joseph Dharmai (Sri Lanka) Randika Doling	(China) Yan Huide (China) Lin Shuangbao
Mixed doubles SH6	(China) Luo Guangliang (China) Li Fengmei	(India) Mark Joseph Dharmai (Sri Lanka) Randika Doling	(Thailand) Bunthan Yaemmali (Thailand) Kannikon Yaemmali

=== 2025 Nakhon Ratchasima ===
Event	Gold	Silver	Bronze
Men's singles WH1	(China) Qu Zimo	(Malaysia) Muhammad Ikhwan Ramli	(South Korea) Choi Jung-man
Men's singles WH1	(China) Qu Zimo	(Malaysia) Muhammad Ikhwan Ramli	(South Korea) Jeong Jae-gun
Men's singles WH2	(Japan) Daiki Kajiwara	(South Korea) Kim Jung-jun	(South Korea) Yu Soo-young
Men's singles WH2	(Japan) Daiki Kajiwara	(South Korea) Kim Jung-jun	(China) Zhao Xin
Men's singles SL3	(India) Kumar Nitesh	(Indonesia) Muh Al Imran	(India) Umesh Vikram Kumar
Men's singles SL3	(India) Kumar Nitesh	(Indonesia) Muh Al Imran	(South Korea) Lee Seung-hu
Men's singles SL4	(Malaysia) Mohd Amin Burhanuddin	(India) Surya Kant Yadav	(India) Naveen Sivakumar
Men's singles SL4	(Malaysia) Mohd Amin Burhanuddin	(India) Surya Kant Yadav	(South Korea) Cho Na-dan
Men's singles SU5	(Malaysia) Cheah Liek Hou	(Indonesia) Dheva Anrimusthi	(Indonesia) Suryo Nugroho
Men's singles SU5	(Malaysia) Cheah Liek Hou	(Indonesia) Dheva Anrimusthi	(Malaysia) Muhammad Fareez Anuar
Men's singles SH6	(Thailand) Natthapong Meechai	(China) Lin Naili	(Hong Kong) Chu Man Kai
Men's singles SH6	(Thailand) Natthapong Meechai	(China) Lin Naili	(India) Krishna Nagar
Men's doubles WH1–WH2	(China) Mai Jianpeng (China) Qu Zimo	(Japan) Daiki Kajiwara (Japan) Keita Nishimura	(South Korea) Choi Jung-man (South Korea) Kim Jung-jun
Men's doubles WH1–WH2	(China) Mai Jianpeng (China) Qu Zimo	(Japan) Daiki Kajiwara (Japan) Keita Nishimura	(India) Prem Kumar Ale (India) Abu Hubaida
Men's doubles SL3–SL4	(India) Sukant Kadam (India) Kumar Nitesh	(India) Jagadesh Dilli (India) Naveen Sivakumar	(India) Md Arwaz Ansari (India) Abhijeet Sakhuja
Men's doubles SL3–SL4	(India) Sukant Kadam (India) Kumar Nitesh	(India) Jagadesh Dilli (India) Naveen Sivakumar	(Thailand) Mongkhon Bunsun (Thailand) Siripong Teamarrom
Men's doubles SU5	(Malaysia) Cheah Liek Hou (Malaysia) Muhammad Fareez Anuar	(India) Hardik Makkar (India) Ruthick Raghupathi	(India) Chirag Baretha (India) Raj Kumar
Men's doubles SU5	(Malaysia) Cheah Liek Hou (Malaysia) Muhammad Fareez Anuar	(India) Hardik Makkar (India) Ruthick Raghupathi	(Chinese Taipei) Fang Jen-yu (Chinese Taipei) Pu Gui-yu
Men's doubles SH6	(South Korea) Lee Dae-sung (Thailand) Natthapong Meechai	(China) Lin Naili (China) Zeng Qingtao	(Hong Kong) Chu Man Kai (Hong Kong) Wong Chun Yim
Men's doubles SH6	(South Korea) Lee Dae-sung (Thailand) Natthapong Meechai	(China) Lin Naili (China) Zeng Qingtao	(India) Krishna Nagar (India) Dhinagaran Pandurangan
Women's singles WH1	(Japan) Sarina Satomi	(China) Yin Menglu	(China) Fan Chaoyue
Women's singles WH1	(Japan) Sarina Satomi	(China) Yin Menglu	(Japan) Sena Tomoyose
Women's singles WH2	(China) Liu Yutong	(China) Li Hongyan	(India) Alphia James
Women's singles WH2	(China) Liu Yutong	(China) Li Hongyan	(South Korea) Jung Gyeo-ul
Women's singles SL3	(Indonesia) Qonitah Ikhtiar Syakuroh	(India) Mandeep Kaur	(India) Manasi Girishchandra Joshi
Women's singles SL3	(Indonesia) Qonitah Ikhtiar Syakuroh	(India) Mandeep Kaur	(China) Xiao Zuxian
Women's singles SL4	(Indonesia) Khalimatus Sadiyah	(India) Palak Kohli	(Thailand) Chanida Srinavakul
Women's singles SL4	(Indonesia) Khalimatus Sadiyah	(India) Palak Kohli	(Philippines) Kathleen Pedrosa
Women's singles SU5	(India) Manisha Ramadass	(China) Yang Qiuxia	(India) Thulasimathi Murugesan
Women's singles SU5	(India) Manisha Ramadass	(China) Yang Qiuxia	(China) Li Tongtong
Women's singles SH6	(China) Li Fengmei	(India) Nithya Sre Sivan	(China) Lin Shuangbao
Women's singles SH6	(China) Li Fengmei	(India) Nithya Sre Sivan	(Thailand) Chai Saeyang
Women's doubles WH1–WH2	(China) Yin Menglu (China) Liu Yutong	(China) Li Hongyan (China) Fan Chaoyue	(India) Alphia James (India) Pallavi Kuluvehalli
Women's doubles SL3–SU5	(China) Xiao Zuxian (China) Yang Qiuxia	(India) Manasi Girishchandra Joshi (India) Thulasimathi Murugesan	(China) Li Tongtong (China) Lu Yuemei
Women's doubles SL3–SU5	(China) Xiao Zuxian (China) Yang Qiuxia	(India) Manasi Girishchandra Joshi (India) Thulasimathi Murugesan	(India) Manisha Ramadass (India) Mandeep Kaur
Women's doubles SH6	(China) Li Fengmei (China) Lin Shuangbao	(India) Nithya Sre Sivan (India) Rachana Patel	(Chinese Taipei) Wu Yu-yen (Chinese Taipei) Cai Yi-lin
Mixed doubles WH1–WH2	(China) Qu Zimo (China) Liu Yutong	(South Korea) Park Hae-song (South Korea) Jung Gyeo-ul	(China) Zhao Xin (China) Yin Menglu
Mixed doubles WH1–WH2	(China) Qu Zimo (China) Liu Yutong	(South Korea) Park Hae-song (South Korea) Jung Gyeo-ul	(Chinese Taipei) Ong Yu-yu (Chinese Taipei) Yang I-chen
Mixed doubles SL3–SU5	(India) Kumar Nitesh (India) Thulasimathi Murugesan	(India) Ruthick Raghupathi (India) Manasi Girishchandra Joshi	(India) Chirag Baretha (India) Mandeep Kaur
Mixed doubles SL3–SU5	(India) Kumar Nitesh (India) Thulasimathi Murugesan	(India) Ruthick Raghupathi (India) Manasi Girishchandra Joshi	(Indonesia) Fredy Setiawan (Indonesia) Khalimatus Sadiyah
Mixed doubles SH6	(China) Lin Naili (China) Li Fengmei	(India) Krishna Nagar (India) Nithya Sre Sivan	(China) Zeng Qingtao (China) Lin Shuangbao
Mixed doubles SH6	(China) Lin Naili (China) Li Fengmei	(India) Krishna Nagar (India) Nithya Sre Sivan	(Thailand) Natthapong Meechai (Thailand) Chai Saeyang

== See also ==
- Badminton Asia Championships
- Badminton Asia Junior Championships
