= 2011 BWF Para-Badminton World Championships =

Tournament details
- Dates: 22–26 November 2011
- Edition: 8th
- Venue: Coliseo Deportivo Guatemala
- Location: Guatemala City, Guatemala

The 2011 BWF Para-Badminton World Championships (Spanish: Campeonato Mundial de Parabádminton 2011) were held from 22 to 26 November 2011 in Guatemala City, Guatemala. 21 events were contested in the tournament. This was also the last tournament to host the mixed team event, which was later discontinued in 2013.

== Host city selection ==
In October 2011, the Badminton World Federation awarded Guatemala the rights to host the 8th Para-Badminton World Championships, with Guatemala City chosen as the host city of the tournament.

== Medalists ==
=== Men's events ===
Event	Gold	Silver	Bronze
Singles WH1/2	(South Korea) Lee Sam-seop	(Germany) Thomas Wandschneider	(France) David Toupé
Singles WH1/2	(South Korea) Lee Sam-seop	(Germany) Thomas Wandschneider	(Turkey) Avni Kertmen
Singles WH3	(South Korea) Shim Jae-yeol	(Malaysia) Madzlan Saibon	(Netherlands) Marcel Smouter
Singles WH3	(South Korea) Shim Jae-yeol	(Malaysia) Madzlan Saibon	(Israel) Amir Levi
Singles STL2 (SL3)	(Malaysia) Loi Lang Yean	(Scotland) Alan Oliver	(Chinese Taipei) Huang Hsing-chih
Singles STL2 (SL3)	(Malaysia) Loi Lang Yean	(Scotland) Alan Oliver	(Spain) Juan Antonio Ramírez
Singles STL2a (SL3a)	(South Korea) Kim Chang-man	(Spain) Simón Cruz Mondejar	(Peru) Pedro Pablo de Vinatea
Singles STL2a (SL3a)	(South Korea) Kim Chang-man	(Spain) Simón Cruz Mondejar	(Japan) Daisuke Fujihara
Singles STL3 (SL4)	(Malaysia) Hairol Fozi Saaba	(Chinese Taipei) Lin Cheng-che	(Malaysia) Michael Sydney
Singles STL3 (SL4)	(Malaysia) Hairol Fozi Saaba	(Chinese Taipei) Lin Cheng-che	(Guatemala) Raúl Anguiano
Singles STL3a (SL4a)	(Scotland) Steven Moodie	(Australia) Rod Rantall	(England) Bobby Griffin
Singles STU4 (SU5a)	(Japan) Gen Shogaki	(Japan) Kohei Obara	(Russia) Mikhail Chiviksin
Singles STU4 (SU5a)	(Japan) Gen Shogaki	(Japan) Kohei Obara	(Hong Kong) Chan Cho Leung
Singles STU5 (SU5b)	(Malaysia) Cheah Liek Hou	(Turkey) İlker Tuzcu	(Israel) Eyal Bachar
Singles STU5 (SU5b)	(Malaysia) Cheah Liek Hou	(Turkey) İlker Tuzcu	(Chinese Taipei) Lee Meng-yuan
Singles STD7 (SS6/SH6)	(Republic of Ireland) Niall McVeigh	(Russia) Alexander Mekhdiev	(England) Krysten Coombs
Doubles WH1/2	(Turkey) Avni Kertmen (Germany) Thomas Wandschneider	(Japan) Osamu Nagashima (Japan) Seiji Yamami	(Russia) Pavel Popov (Russia) Yuri Stepanov
Doubles WH1/2	(Turkey) Avni Kertmen (Germany) Thomas Wandschneider	(Japan) Osamu Nagashima (Japan) Seiji Yamami	(Russia) Alexander Polstyankin (France) David Toupé
Doubles WH3	(South Korea) Lee Sam-seop (South Korea) Shim Jae-yeol	(Israel) Amir Levi (Israel) Makbel Shefanya	(Israel) Moshe Bar-Hen (Israel) Avraham Oren
Doubles WH3	(South Korea) Lee Sam-seop (South Korea) Shim Jae-yeol	(Israel) Amir Levi (Israel) Makbel Shefanya	(Hong Kong) Chan Ho Yuen (Netherlands) Marcel Smouter
Doubles STL2 (SL3)	(South Korea) Kim Chang-man (Malaysia) Loi Lang Yean	(Chinese Taipei) Chang Yu-yung (Chinese Taipei) Huang Hsing-chih	(Japan) Daisuke Fujihara (Japan) Yusuke Yamaguchi
Doubles STL2 (SL3)	(South Korea) Kim Chang-man (Malaysia) Loi Lang Yean	(Chinese Taipei) Chang Yu-yung (Chinese Taipei) Huang Hsing-chih	(Russia) Oleg Dontsov (Hong Kong) Tsang Chiu Pong
Doubles STL3 (SL4)	(Malaysia) Hairol Fozi Saaba (Malaysia) Michael Sydney	(Chinese Taipei) Lin Cheng-che (Chinese Taipei) Lin Yung-chang	(England) Bobby Griffin (Scotland) Steven Moodie
Doubles STL3 (SL4)	(Malaysia) Hairol Fozi Saaba (Malaysia) Michael Sydney	(Chinese Taipei) Lin Cheng-che (Chinese Taipei) Lin Yung-chang	(Guatemala) Raúl Anguiano (Germany) Jan-Niklas Pott
Doubles SU5	(Malaysia) Cheah Liek Hou (Malaysia) Suhalli Laiman	(Japan) Kohei Obara (Japan) Gen Shogaki	(Turkey) Tunahan Eser (Turkey) Ilker Tuzcu
Doubles SU5	(Malaysia) Cheah Liek Hou (Malaysia) Suhalli Laiman	(Japan) Kohei Obara (Japan) Gen Shogaki	(Israel) Eyal Bachar (England) Antony Forster

=== Women's events ===
Event	Gold	Silver	Bronze
Singles WH1/2	(South Korea) Son Ok-cha	(Switzerland) Karin Suter-Erath	(Switzerland) Sonja Häsler
Singles WH1/2	(South Korea) Son Ok-cha	(Switzerland) Karin Suter-Erath	(Spain) Sofía Balsalobre
Singles WH3	(Netherlands) Ilse van de Burgwal	(South Korea) Kim Yun-sim	(Turkey) Emine Seçkin
Singles SL4	(Japan) Akiko Sugino	(Japan) Yūko Yamaguchi	(Japan) Aki Takahashi
Singles SL4	(Japan) Akiko Sugino	(Japan) Yūko Yamaguchi	(South Korea) Heo Sun-hee
Doubles WH3	(Switzerland) Sonja Häsler (Switzerland) Karin Suter-Erath	(Netherlands) Inge Bakker (Netherlands) Ilse van de Burgwal	(South Korea) Kim Yun-sim (South Korea) Son Ok-cha
Doubles WH3	(Switzerland) Sonja Häsler (Switzerland) Karin Suter-Erath	(Netherlands) Inge Bakker (Netherlands) Ilse van de Burgwal	(Israel) Nina Gorodetzky (Turkey) Emine Seçkin

=== Mixed events ===
==== Individual ====
Event	Gold	Silver	Bronze
Doubles WH1/2	(South Korea) Lee Sam-seop (South Korea) Son Ok-cha	(France) David Toupé (Switzerland) Sonja Häsler	(Turkey) Avni Kertmen (Switzerland) Karin Suter-Erath
Doubles WH1/2	(South Korea) Lee Sam-seop (South Korea) Son Ok-cha	(France) David Toupé (Switzerland) Sonja Häsler	(Israel) Shimon Shalom (Israel) Nina Gorodetzky
Doubles WH2	(South Korea) Sim Jae-you (South Korea) Kim Yun-sim	(Netherlands) Marcel Smouter (Netherlands) Ilse van de Burgwal	(England) Gobi Ranganathan (Turkey) Emine Seçkin
Doubles STL (SL3–SU5)	(Malaysia) Loi Lang Yean (Japan) Akiko Sugino	(Hong Kong) Chan Cho Leung (South Korea) Heo Sun-hee	(Japan) Daisuke Fujihara (Japan) Aki Takahashi

==== Team ====
Event	Gold	Silver	Bronze
Team STL2–STU5 (SL3–SU5)	Malaysia; Cheah Liek Hou; Suhaili Laiman; Loi Lang Yean; Hairol Fozi Saaba; Michael Sydney	Chinese Taipei; Chen Yu-yung; Huang Hsing-chih; Lee Meng-yuan; Lin Cheng-che; Lin Yung-chang; Yeh En-chuan	Germany; Frank Dietel; Tim Haller; Sebastian Müller; Jan-Niklas Pott; Heiko Vüllers
Team STL2–STU5 (SL3–SU5)	Malaysia; Cheah Liek Hou; Suhaili Laiman; Loi Lang Yean; Hairol Fozi Saaba; Michael Sydney	Chinese Taipei; Chen Yu-yung; Huang Hsing-chih; Lee Meng-yuan; Lin Cheng-che; Lin Yung-chang; Yeh En-chuan	Japan; Daisuke Fujihara; Kohei Obara; Gen Shogaki; Aki Takahashi; Yūko Yamaguchi; Yusuke Yamaguchi

== Medal table ==
Rank	Nation	Gold	Silver	Bronze	Total
1	South Korea	7.5	1.5	2	11
2	Malaysia	7	1	1	9
3	Japan	2.5	4	5	11.5
4	Netherlands	1	2	1.5	4.5
5	Switzerland	1	1.5	1.5	4
6	Scotland	1	1	0.5	2.5
7	Ireland	1	0	0	1
8	Turkey	0.5	1	4.5	6
9	Germany	0.5	1	1.5	3
10	Chinese Taipei	0	4	2	6
11	Israel	0	1	5	6
12	Russia	0	1	3	4
13	Spain	0	1	2	3
14	Australia	0	1	0	1
15	Hong Kong	0	0.5	2	2.5
16	France	0	0.5	1	1.5
17	England	0	0	3.5	3.5
18	Guatemala	0	0	1.5	1.5
19	Peru	0	0	1	1
Totals (19 entries)		22	22	38.5	82.5

== Team event ==
The team event of the Para-Badminton World Championships took place on 22 November 2011. The event was created specifically for players that are competing in the standing events, ranging from STL2 to STU5. Seven teams took part in the event. Chinese Taipei received a bye in the quarter-final stage.

=== Bracket ===
Quarter-finals
Japan	2
Russia	1
Guatemala	0
Germany	3
Spain	1
Malaysia	2

Semi-finals
Chinese Taipei	2
Japan	1
Germany	1
Malaysia	2

Final
Chinese Taipei	1
Malaysia	2

=== Quarter-finals ===
Japan
2
Coliseo Deportivo, Court 2
22 November 2011, 10:00 UTC−6

Russia
1

			1	2	3
1	(Japan) (Russia)	Yūko Yamaguchi; Oleg Dontsov	15; 21	16; 21
2	(Japan) (Russia)	Gen Shogaki; Mikhail Chiviksin	21; 16	21; 15
3	(Japan) (Russia)	Kohei Obara / Daisuke Fujihara; Mikhail Chiviksin / Ramil Yuldashev	21; 7	21; 12

Germany
3
Coliseo Deportivo, Court 3
22 November 2011, 10:00 UTC−6

Guatemala
0

			1	2	3
1	(Germany) (Guatemala)	Jan-Niklas Pott; David Morales	21; 7	21; 7
2	(Germany) (Guatemala)	Frank Dietel; Raúl Anguiano	17; 21	21; 14	21; 14
3	(Germany) (Guatemala)	Sebastian Müller / Heiko Vüllers; Carlos Aldana / Erick Madriz	21; 3	21; 6

Malaysia
2
Coliseo Deportivo, Court 4
22 November 2011, 10:00 UTC−6

Spain
1

			1	2	3
1	(Malaysia) (Spain)	Michael Sydney; Simón Cruz Mondejar	21; 6	21; 9
2	(Malaysia) (Spain)	Cheah Liek Hou; Pablo Ramos				w/o
3	(Malaysia) (Spain)	Suhaili Laiman / Hairol Fozi Saaba; Juan Antonio Ramírez / Félix Fernández	21; 7	21; 7

=== Semi-finals ===
Japan
1
Coliseo Deportivo, Court 2
22 November 2011, 14:00 UTC−6

Chinese Taipei
2

			1	2	3
1	(Japan) (Chinese Taipei)	Aki Takahashi; Lin Cheng-che	8; 21	5; 21
2	(Japan) (Chinese Taipei)	Gen Shogaki; Yeh En-chuan	21; 11	21; 10
3	(Japan) (Chinese Taipei)	Kohei Obara / Daisuke Fujihara; Lee Meng-yuan / Lin Yung-chang	13; 21	14; 21

Malaysia
2
Coliseo Deportivo, Court 3
22 November 2011, 14:00 UTC−6

Germany
1

			1	2	3
1	(Malaysia) (Germany)	Hairol Fozi Saaba; Jan-Niklas Pott	21; 8	21; 17
2	(Malaysia) (Germany)	Cheah Liek Hou; Frank Dietel	21; 8	21; 14
3	(Malaysia) (Germany)	Suhaili Laiman / Michael Sydney; Tim Haller / Sebastian Müller				w/o

=== Final ===
Malaysia
2
Coliseo Deportivo, Court 2
22 November 2011, 17:00 UTC−6

Chinese Taipei
1

			1	2	3
1	(Malaysia) (Chinese Taipei)	Michael Sydney; Lin Cheng-che	21; 12	21; 15
2	(Malaysia) (Chinese Taipei)	Cheah Liek Hou; Huang Hsing-chih	21; 9	21; 6
3	(Malaysia) (Chinese Taipei)	Suhaili Laiman / Hairol Fozi Saaba; Lee Meng-yuan / Lin Yung-chang				w/o

== See also ==
- 2011 BWF World Championships
