= 2005 IBAD Para-Badminton World Championships =

Tournament details
- Dates: 27 October – 1 November 2007
- Edition: 5th
- Venue: Hsinchu Municipal Gymnasium
- Location: Hsinchu, Taiwan

The 2005 IBAD Para-Badminton World Championships (Chinese: 2005年世界殘障羽球錦標賽) were held from 27 October to 1 November 2005 in Hsinchu, Taiwan. 19 events were contested in the tournament.

== Medalists ==
=== Men's events ===
Event	Gold	Silver	Bronze
Singles BMW2 (WH1)	(Germany) Thomas Wandschneider	(South Korea) Lee Sam-seop	(Germany) Avni Kertmen
Singles BMW3 (WH2)	(Netherlands) Quincy Michielsen	(Malaysia) Madzlan Saibon	(Israel) Yossi Baba
Singles BMSTL1 (SL3)	(Chinese Taipei) Huang Yu-jen	(Japan) Masato Matsumoto	(Spain) Alfonso Otero
Singles BMSTL2 (SL3a)	(Germany) Pascal Wolter	(Chinese Taipei) Hsu Jen-ho	(Malaysia) Jasmi Tegol
Singles BMSTL3 (SL4)	(Chinese Taipei) Chuang Liang-tu	(Chinese Taipei) Chiang Chung-hou	(Thailand) Adisak Saengarayakul
Singles BMSTU4 (SU5a)	(Japan) Tetsuo Ura	(Hong Kong) Lam Tak Kwan	(Hong Kong) Wong Shu Yuen
Singles BMSTU5 (SU5b)	(Malaysia) Cheah Liek Hou	(Israel) Eyal Bachar	(Germany) Frank Dietel
Doubles BMW2 (WH1)	(Germany) Avni Kertmen (Germany) Thomas Wandschneider	(South Korea) Choi Jung-man (South Korea) Lee Sam-seop	(Japan) Yukiya Kusunose (Japan) Osamu Nagashima
Doubles BMW3 (WH2)	(Israel) Yossi Baba (Israel) Amir Levi	(Israel) Makbel Shefanya (Israel) Moshe Zehavi	(South Korea) Lee Dong-hwa (South Korea) Park Kyung-seok
Doubles BMSTL1–2 (SL3)	(Malaysia) Jasmi Tegol (Malaysia) Radhi Juhari	(South Korea) Kim Chang-man (South Korea) Shin Jung-sung	(Chinese Taipei) Chin Ke (Chinese Taipei) Hsu Jen-ho
Doubles BMSTL3 (SL4)	(Chinese Taipei) Chiang Chung-hou (Chinese Taipei) Chuang Liang-tu	(Malaysia) Bakri Omar (Malaysia) Hairol Fozi Saaba	(Malaysia) Ahmad Fuad Mohd Jafri (Malaysia) Suhaili Laiman
Doubles BMSTU4 (SU5a)	(Hong Kong) Wong Shu Yuen (Hong Kong) Jeffrey Zee	(Japan) Hirotaka Nishiguchi (Japan) Tetsuo Ura	(Spain) Félix Fernández (Spain) Pablo Ramos
Doubles BMSTU5 (SU5b)	(Malaysia) Cheah Liek Hou (Malaysia) Razali Jaafar	(Chinese Taipei) Chang Cheng-cheng (Chinese Taipei) Lee Meng-yuan	(Malaysia) Hamizan Mohamed (Malaysia) Thiraviasamy Savarinathan

=== Women's events ===
Event	Gold	Silver	Bronze
Singles BMW2–3 (WH1–WH2)	(Netherlands) Carol de Meijer	(Netherlands) Nicole Kettenis	(Japan) Midori Kagotani
Singles BMSTL2–3 (SL3–SL4)	(Hong Kong) Ma Hoi Kwan	(Japan) Aki Takahashi	(Chinese Taipei) Chen Li-chin
Doubles BMW2–3 (WH1–WH2)	(Netherlands) Carol de Meijer (Netherlands) Nicole Kettenis	(Japan) Miho Hamasaki (Japan) Midori Kagotani	(South Korea) Lee Mi-jung (South Korea) Nam Sun
Doubles BMSTL2–3 (SL3–SL4)	(Hong Kong) Ma Hoi Kwan (Hong Kong) Ng Lai Ling	(Chinese Taipei) Chen Li-chin (Chinese Taipei) Hsieh Mei-en	(Japan) Noriko Ito (Japan) Aki Takahashi

=== Mixed events ===
==== Individual ====
Event	Gold	Silver	Bronze
Doubles BMW2–3 (WH1–WH2)	(Netherlands) Quincy Michielsen (Netherlands) Carol de Meijer	(Netherlands) Ton Hollaar (Netherlands) Nicole Kettenis	(Japan) Osamu Nagashima (Japan) Midori Kagotani

==== Team ====
Event	Gold	Silver	Bronze
Team BMSTL1–BMSTU5 (SL3–SU5)	Malaysia	Chinese Taipei	Germany

== Medal table ==
Rank	Nation	Gold	Silver	Bronze	Total
1	Malaysia	4	2	3	9
2	Netherlands	4	2	0	6
3	Chinese Taipei	3	5	2	10
4	Hong Kong	3	1	1	5
5	Germany	3	0	3	6
6	Japan	1	4	4	9
7	Israel	1	2	1	4
8	South Korea	0	3	1	4
9	Spain	0	0	2	2
10	Thailand	0	0	1	1
Totals (10 entries)		19	19	18	56

== Team event ==
10 teams took part in the standing team event. Malaysia won the event by defeating Chinese Taipei 2–1 in the final.

=== Bracket ===
Round of 16
Spain	0
South Korea	2
India	0
Hong Kong	2

Quarter-finals
Chinese Taipei	2
Japan	1
Germany	2
South Korea	0
Hong Kong	1
Israel	2
Russia	0
Malaysia	2

Semi-finals
Chinese Taipei	2
Germany	1
Israel	0
Malaysia	2

Final
Chinese Taipei	1
Malaysia	2
Third place
Germany	2
Israel	1

== See also ==
- 2005 IBF World Championships
- List of sporting events in Taiwan
