= 2009 IBAD Para-Badminton World Championships =

Tournament details
- Dates: 7–12 September 2009
- Edition: 7th
- Venue: Olympic Fencing Gymnasium
- Location: Seoul, South Korea

The 2009 IBAD Para-Badminton World Championships (Korean: 2009 세계장애인배드민턴선수권대회) were held from 7 to 12 September 2009 at the Olympic Fencing Stadium in Seoul, South Korea. 22 events were contested in the tournament.

== Host city selection ==
South Korea was chosen as the host for the Para-Badminton World Championships in August 2009, with Seoul being the host city of the tournament. The Olympic Fencing Stadium in Bangi-dong was chosen as the venue for the tournament.

== Medalists ==
=== Men's events ===
Event	Gold	Silver	Bronze
Singles BMW2 (WH1)	(South Korea) Lee Sam-seop	(South Korea) Lee Yong-ho	(France) David Toupé
Singles BMW2 (WH1)	(South Korea) Lee Sam-seop	(South Korea) Lee Yong-ho	(Japan) Osamu Nagashima
Singles BMW2 (WH2)	(South Korea) Shim Jae-yeol	(South Korea) Kim Sung-hun	(Israel) Amir Levi
Singles BMW2 (WH2)	(South Korea) Shim Jae-yeol	(South Korea) Kim Sung-hun	(Spain) José Guillermo Lama
Singles BMSTL1 (SL3)	(India) Pramod Bhagat	(Thailand) Subpong Meepian	(Japan) Takayuki Taniguchi
Singles BMSTL1 (SL3)	(India) Pramod Bhagat	(Thailand) Subpong Meepian	(Thailand) Banchop Wongkhamkhruea
Singles BMSTL2 (SL3a)	(South Korea) Kim Chang-man	(Japan) Toshiaki Suenaga	(Germany) Pascal Wolter
Singles BMSTL2 (SL3a)	(South Korea) Kim Chang-man	(Japan) Toshiaki Suenaga	(Chinese Taipei) Hsu Jen-ho
Singles BMSTL3 (SL4)	(Hong Kong) Yu Kwong Wah	(Chinese Taipei) Lin Cheng-che	(Guatemala) Raúl Anguiano
Singles BMSTL3 (SL4)	(Hong Kong) Yu Kwong Wah	(Chinese Taipei) Lin Cheng-che	(South Korea) Jun Dong-chun
Singles BMSTL3a (SL4a)	(Thailand) Adisak Saengarayakul	(Sri Lanka) Lalith Kumara Wathuhena	(Sri Lanka) Deepal Herath Lekamralage
Singles BMSTU4 (SU5a)	(Hong Kong) Wong Shu Yuen	(Hong Kong) Jeffrey Zee	(Hong Kong) Lam Tak Kwan
Singles BMSTU4 (SU5a)	(Hong Kong) Wong Shu Yuen	(Hong Kong) Jeffrey Zee	(Sri Lanka) Upul Bandara
Singles BMSTU5 (SU5b)	(India) Raj Kumar	(Israel) Eyal Bachar	(India) Rakesh Pandey
Singles BMSTU5 (SU5b)	(India) Raj Kumar	(Israel) Eyal Bachar	(Chinese Taipei) Lee Meng-yuan
Doubles BMW2 (WH1)	(South Korea) Lee Sam-seop (South Korea) Lee Yong-ho	(Turkey) Avni Kertmen (France) David Toupé	(Japan) Osamu Nagashima (Japan) Tsutomu Shimada
Doubles BMW3 (WH2)	(South Korea) Kim Sung-hun (South Korea) Shim Jae-yeol	(Thailand) Jakarin Homhual (Thailand) Dumnern Junthong	(Israel) Amir Levi (Israel) Avraham Oren
Doubles BMW3 (WH2)	(South Korea) Kim Sung-hun (South Korea) Shim Jae-yeol	(Thailand) Jakarin Homhual (Thailand) Dumnern Junthong	(Sri Lanka) Munidasa Walimunige (Sri Lanka) Wasala Jayathilaka Banda
Doubles BMSTL1 (SL3a)	(Thailand) Subpong Meepian (Thailand) Banchop Wongkhamkhruea	(Hong Kong) Tsang Chiu Pong (Hong Kong) Tung Fung Kwong	(India) Nurul Hossain Khan (India) Gedala Dilleswar Rao
Doubles BMSTL2 (SL3b)	(South Korea) Kim Chang-man (South Korea) Lee Chun-ui	(Japan) Manabu Umeda (Japan) Takayuki Taniguchi	(Japan) Yusuke Yamaguchi (Japan) Katsumasa Suzuki
Doubles BMSTL3 (SL4)	(Hong Kong) Chu Siu Keung (Hong Kong) Yu Kwong Wah	(South Korea) Jun Dong-chun (South Korea) Kim Jae-hoon	(Japan) Toshiaki Suenaga (Japan) Taku Hiroi
Doubles BMSTL3 (SL4)	(Hong Kong) Chu Siu Keung (Hong Kong) Yu Kwong Wah	(South Korea) Jun Dong-chun (South Korea) Kim Jae-hoon	(Guatemala) Raúl Anguiano (Thailand) Adisak Saengarayakul
Doubles BMSTU4 (SU5a)	(Japan) Tetsuo Ura (Japan) Yoshiaki Mori	(Hong Kong) Jeffrey Zee (Hong Kong) Lam Tak Kwan	(Sri Lanka) Upul Bandara (India) Satyam Janapareddi
Doubles BMSTU5 (SU5b)	(India) Raj Kumar (India) Rakesh Pandey	(Chinese Taipei) Lee Meng-yuan (Chinese Taipei) Lin Cheng-che	(Israel) Eyal Bachar (Israel) Jonathan Levy
Doubles BMSTU5 (SU5b)	(India) Raj Kumar (India) Rakesh Pandey	(Chinese Taipei) Lee Meng-yuan (Chinese Taipei) Lin Cheng-che	(Germany) Frank Dietel (Turkey) İlker Tuzcu

=== Women's events ===
Event	Gold	Silver	Bronze
Singles BMW2 (WH1)	(Thailand) Sujirat Pookkham	(South Korea) Lee Mi-ok	(Israel) Nina Gorodetzky
Singles BMW2 (WH1)	(Thailand) Sujirat Pookkham	(South Korea) Lee Mi-ok	(South Korea) Son Ok-cha
Singles BMW3 (WH2)	(Thailand) Amnouy Wetwithan	(South Korea) Lee Sun-ae	(South Korea) Kim Yun-sim
Singles BMSTL2 (SL3)	(South Korea) Heo Sun-hee	(Thailand) Wandee Kamtam	(South Korea) Lee Jeon-suk
Singles BMSTL3 (SL4)	(China) Ma Huihui	(China) Wang Songye	(Japan) Yūko Yamaguchi
Singles BMSTL3 (SL4)	(China) Ma Huihui	(China) Wang Songye	(Thailand) Nipada Saensupa
Singles BMSTU5 (SU5)	(Japan) Ayako Suzuki	(China) Ma Huihui	Not awarded
Doubles BMW2+3 (WH1–WH2)	(South Korea) Kim Yun-sim (South Korea) Lee Sun-ae	(Thailand) Sujirat Pookkham (Thailand) Amnouy Wetwithan	(Israel) Shulamit Dahan (Israel) Nina Gorodetzky
Doubles BMW2+3 (WH1–WH2)	(South Korea) Kim Yun-sim (South Korea) Lee Sun-ae	(Thailand) Sujirat Pookkham (Thailand) Amnouy Wetwithan	(South Korea) Lee Mi-ok (South Korea) Son Ok-cha
Doubles BMSTL2+3 (SL3–SL4)	(China) Ma Huihui (China) Wang Songye	(Japan) Aki Takahashi (Japan) Yūko Yamaguchi	(Thailand) Wandee Kamtam (Thailand) Nipada Saensupa

=== Mixed events ===
==== Individual ====
Event	Gold	Silver	Bronze
Doubles BMW2 (WH1)	(South Korea) Lee Sam-seop (South Korea) Lee Mi-ok	(South Korea) Lee Yong-ho (South Korea) Son Ok-cha	(Japan) Osamu Nagashima (Japan) Midori Shimada
Doubles BMW3 (WH2)	(Thailand) Dumnern Junthong (Thailand) Amnouy Wetwithan	(South Korea) Shim Jae-yeol (South Korea) Kim Yun-sim	(South Korea) Kim Sung-hun (South Korea) Lee Sun-ae

==== Team ====
Event	Gold	Silver	Bronze
Team STL2–STU5 (SL3–SU5)	Hong Kong	Chinese Taipei	South Korea
Team STL2–STU5 (SL3–SU5)	Hong Kong	Chinese Taipei	Germany

== Medal table ==
Rank	Nation	Gold	Silver	Bronze	Total
1	South Korea	9	7	7	23
2	Thailand	5	4	3.5	12.5
3	Hong Kong	4	3	1	8
4	India	3	0	2.5	5.5
5	Japan	2	3	7	12
6	China	2	2	0	4
7	Chinese Taipei	0	3	2	5
8	Israel	0	1	5	6
9	Sri Lanka	0	1	3.5	4.5
10	France	0	0.5	1	1.5
11	Turkey	0	0.5	0.5	1
12	Germany	0	0	2.5	2.5
13	Guatemala	0	0	1.5	1.5
14	Spain	0	0	1	1
Totals (14 entries)		25	25	38	88

== Team event ==
Seven teams competed in the standing team event. Hong Kong received a bye in the quarter-finals.

=== Bracket ===
Quarter-finals
Germany	2
Israel	1
Japan	0
Chinese Taipei	2
South Korea	2
India	0

Semi-finals
Hong Kong	2
Germany	0
Chinese Taipei	2
South Korea	0

Final
Hong Kong	2
Chinese Taipei	0

== See also ==
- 2009 BWF World Championships
