= Osamu Nagashima =

Japanese para-badminton player (born 1979)

Osamu Nagashima 長島 理
Personal information
- Born: 21 October 1979 (age 47) Saitama, Saitama Prefecture, Japan

Sport
- Country: Japan
- Sport: Badminton
- Handedness: Left

Men's singles WH1 Men's doubles WH1–WH2 Mixed doubles WH1–WH2
- Highest ranking: 5 (MS 16 April 2024); 6 (MD with Atsuya Watanabe 1 October 2019); 2 (XD with Yuma Yamazaki 1 January 2019)
- Current ranking: 6 (MS); 30 (MD with Takumi Matsumoto) (17 September 2024)
- BWF profile
Medal record
Men's para-badminton
Representing Japan
World Championships
| Silver medal – second place | 2011 Guatemala City | Men's doubles |
| Bronze medal – third place | 2005 Hsinchu | Men's doubles |
| Bronze medal – third place | 2005 Hsinchu | Mixed doubles |
| Bronze medal – third place | 2007 Bangkok | Men's singles |
| Bronze medal – third place | 2009 Seoul | Men's singles |
| Bronze medal – third place | 2009 Seoul | Men's doubles |
| Bronze medal – third place | 2009 Seoul | Mixed doubles |
| Silver medal – second place | 2013 Dortmund | Men's singles |
| Bronze medal – third place | 2013 Dortmund | Men's doubles |
| Bronze medal – third place | 2013 Dortmund | Mixed doubles |
| Bronze medal – third place | 2015 Stoke Mandeville | Men's doubles |
| Bronze medal – third place | 2019 Basel | Men's doubles |
Asian Para Games
| Bronze medal – third place | 2010 Guangzhou | Men's singles |
| Bronze medal – third place | 2014 Incheon | Men's singles |
| Bronze medal – third place | 2018 Jakarta | Men's singles |
| Bronze medal – third place | 2018 Jakarta | Mixed doubles |
Asian Championships
| Bronze medal – third place | 2004 Kuala Lumpur | Men's singles |
| Bronze medal – third place | 2004 Kuala Lumpur | Men's doubles |
| Bronze medal – third place | 2012 Yeoju | Men's doubles |
| Bronze medal – third place | 2012 Yeoju | Mixed doubles |
| Bronze medal – third place | 2016 Beijing | Mixed doubles |

Osamu Nagashima (長島 理, Nagashima Osamu; born 21 October 1979) is a Japanese para-badminton player. He reached the quarter-finals of the men's singles WH1 at the 2020 Summer Paralympics but did not advance to the final four. In the 2024 Summer Paralympics, he was eliminated in the group stages of the men's singles WH1 event. He also reached the semi-finals of the men's doubles WH1–WH2 event with his partner Takumi Matsumoto but eventually lost in the bronze medal match.

== Biography ==
Nagashima was an active badminton player during his years in junior high school. During his university years, he suffered a spinal cord injury in an accident and began using a wheelchair. He later discovered wheelchair badminton and started to compete in international para-badminton tournaments.

== Achievements ==
=== World Championships ===
Men's singles WH1
| Year | Venue | Opponent | Score | Result |
|---|---|---|---|---|
| 2007 | Gymnasium 1 Bangkok, Thailand | (South Korea) Choi Jung-man | 4–21, 12–21 | Bronze |
| 2009 | Olympic Fencing Gymnasium; Seoul, South Korea | (South Korea) Lee Sam-seop | 16–21, 22–20, 9–21 | Bronze |
| 2013 | Helmut-Körnig-Halle, Dortmund, Germany | (Thailand) Jakarin Homhual | 21–14, 16–21, 21–23 | Bronze |

Men's doubles WH1–WH2

| Year | Venue | Partner | Opponent | Score | Result |
|---|---|---|---|---|---|
| 2005 | Hsinchu Municipal Gymnasium, Hsinchu, Taiwan | (Japan) Yukiya Kusunose | (Spain) Airam Fernández (Spain) Francisco Pineda | 2–0 | Bronze |
| 2009 | Olympic Fencing Gymnasium, Seoul, South Korea | (Japan) Tsutomu Shimada | (Japan) Hiroki Fujino (Japan) Mitsuyoshi Noine | 21–16, 21–11 | Bronze |
| 2009 | Olympic Fencing Gymnasium, Seoul, South Korea | (Japan) Tsutomu Shimada | (France) David Toupé (Turkey) Avni Kertmen | 16–21, 17–21 | Bronze |
| 2009 | Olympic Fencing Gymnasium, Seoul, South Korea | (Japan) Tsutomu Shimada | (South Korea) Lee Sam-seop (South Korea) Lee Yong-ho | 16–21, 14–21 | Bronze |
| 2009 | Olympic Fencing Gymnasium, Seoul, South Korea | (Japan) Tsutomu Shimada | (Israel) Shalom Kalvansky (Israel) Shalom Shalom | 21–9, 21–9 | Bronze |
| 2011 | Coliseo Deportivo, Guatemala City, Guatemala | (Japan) Seiji Yamami | (Turkey) Avni Kertmen (Germany) Thomas Wandschneider | 10–21, 15–21 | Silver |
| 2013 | Helmut-Körnig-Halle, Dortmund, Germany | (Japan) Seiji Yamami | (France) David Toupé (Germany) Thomas Wandschneider | 13–21, 15–21 | Bronze |
| 2015 | Stoke Mandeville Stadium, Stoke Mandeville, England | (Hong Kong) Chan Ho Yuen | (South Korea) Kim Jung-jun (South Korea) Lee Dong-seop | 9–21, 13–21 | Bronze |
| 2019 | St. Jakobshalle, Basel, Switzerland | (Japan) Atsuya Watanabe | (South Korea) Kim Jung-jun (South Korea) Lee Dong-seop | 13–21, 21–15, 14–21 | Bronze |

Mixed doubles WH1–WH2

| Year | Venue | Partner | Opponent | Score | Result |
|---|---|---|---|---|---|
| 2005 | Hsinchu Municipal Gymnasium, Hsinchu, Taiwan | (Japan) Midori Kagotani | (South Korea) Choi Jung-man (South Korea) Nam Sun | 2–1 | Bronze |
| 2009 | Olympic Fencing Gymnasium, Seoul, South Korea | (Japan) Midori Shimada | (France) David Toupé (Switzerland) Sonja Häsler | 21–10, 21–16 | Bronze |
| 2009 | Olympic Fencing Gymnasium, Seoul, South Korea | (Japan) Midori Shimada | (South Korea) Lee Yong-ho (South Korea) Son Ok-cha | 12–21, 22–20, 17–21 | Bronze |
| 2009 | Olympic Fencing Gymnasium, Seoul, South Korea | (Japan) Midori Shimada | (South Korea) Lee Sam-seop (South Korea) Lee Mi-ok | 14–21, 20–22 | Bronze |
| 2009 | Olympic Fencing Gymnasium, Seoul, South Korea | (Japan) Midori Shimada | (Spain) Roberto Galdos (Spain) Marta Rodriguez | 21–9, 21–9 | Bronze |
| 2013 | Helmut-Körnig-Halle, Dortmund, Germany | (Japan) Rie Ogura | (Turkey) Avni Kertmen (Turkey) Emine Seçkin | 19–21, 13–21 | Bronze |

=== Asian Para Games ===
Men's singles WH1
| Year | Venue | Opponent | Score | Result |
|---|---|---|---|---|
| 2010 | Tianhe Gymnasium; Guangzhou, China | (Malaysia) Zulkafli Shaari | 21–14, 21–13 | Bronze |
| 2014 | Gyeyang Gymnasium; Incheon, South Korea | (South Korea) Choi Jung-man | 15–21, 14–21 | Bronze |
| 2018 | Istora Gelora Bung Karno; Jakarta, Indonesia | (China) Qu Zimo | 16–21, 18–21 | Bronze |

Mixed doubles WH1–WH2
| Year | Venue | Partner | Opponent | Score | Result |
|---|---|---|---|---|---|
| 2018 | Istora Gelora Bung Karno; Jakarta, Indonesia | (Japan) Yuma Yamazaki | (China) Mai Jianpeng (China) Li Hongyan | 16–21, 15–21 | Bronze |

=== Asian Championships ===
Men's singles WH1
| Year | Venue | Opponent | Score | Result |
|---|---|---|---|---|
| 2004 | Stadium Titiwangsa; Kuala Lumpur, Malaysia | (Sri Lanka) Kusum Weerasinghe | 15–10, 9–15, 15–17 | Bronze |

Men's doubles WH1–WH2

| Year | Venue | Partner | Opponent | Score | Result |
|---|---|---|---|---|---|
| 2004 | Stadium Titiwangsa, Kuala Lumpur, Malaysia | (Japan) Yukiya Kusunose | (Malaysia) Madzlan Saibon (Malaysia) Zulkafli Shaari | 3–15, 0–15 | Bronze |
| 2012 (Note: This tournament uses a round robin system.) | Yeoju Sports Center, Yeoju, South Korea | (Japan) Tsutomu Shimada | (Thailand) Jakarin Homhual (Thailand) Chatchai Kornpeekanok | 19–21, 19–21 | Bronze |
| 2012 | Yeoju Sports Center, Yeoju, South Korea | (Japan) Tsutomu Shimada | (South Korea) Kim Jung-jun (South Korea) Lee Sam-seop | 9–21, 12–21 | Bronze |
| 2012 | Yeoju Sports Center, Yeoju, South Korea | (Japan) Tsutomu Shimada | (Chinese Taipei) Fang Chih-tsung (Chinese Taipei) Ong Yu-yu | 21–11, 21–12 | Bronze |
| 2016 | China Administration of Sport for Persons with Disabilities, Beijing, China | (Hong Kong) Chan Ho Yuen | (South Korea) Kim Jung-jun (South Korea) Lee Sam-seop | 9–21, 10–21 | Bronze |

Mixed doubles WH1–WH2

| Year | Venue | Partner | Opponent | Score | Result |
|---|---|---|---|---|---|
| 2012 | Yeoju Sports Center, Yeoju, South Korea | (Japan) Yoko Egami | (Japan) Tsutomu Shimada (Japan) Rie Ogura | 21–19, 21–17 | Bronze |
| 2012 | Yeoju Sports Center, Yeoju, South Korea | (Japan) Yoko Egami | (South Korea) Kim Kyung-hoon (South Korea) Kim Yun-sim | 11–21, 12–21 | Bronze |
| 2012 | Yeoju Sports Center, Yeoju, South Korea | (Japan) Yoko Egami | (South Korea) Kim Sung-hun (South Korea) Lee Sun-ae | 8–21, 8–21 | Bronze |

=== BWF Para Badminton World Circuit (1 runner-up) ===
The BWF Para Badminton World Circuit – Grade 2, Level 1, 2 and 3 tournaments has been sanctioned by the Badminton World Federation from 2022.

Men's singles WH1
| Year | Tournament | Level | Opponent | Score | Result |
|---|---|---|---|---|---|
| 2023 | Western Australia Para Badminton International | Level 2 | (South Korea) Ryu Dong-hyun | 18–21, 13–21 | (silver) Runner-up |

=== International tournaments (from 2011–2021) (8 titles, 2 runners-up) ===
Men's singles WH1
| Year | Tournament | Opponent | Score | Result |
|---|---|---|---|---|
| 2017 | Peru Para Badminton International | (Japan) Hiroshi Murayama | 21–14, 21–16 | (gold) Winner |
| 2018 | Turkish Para Badminton International | (France) David Toupé | 21–14, 21–15 | (gold) Winner |
| 2019 | Denmark Para Badminton International | (Japan) Hiroshi Murayama | 21–13, 11–21, 9–21 | (silver) Runner-up |

Men's doubles WH1–WH2
| Year | Tournament | Partner | Opponent | Score | Result |
|---|---|---|---|---|---|
| 2017 | Peru Para Badminton International | (Japan) Hiroshi Murayama | (Japan) Kouhei Kobayashi (Japan) Atsuya Watanabe | 21–11, 21–14 | (gold) Winner |
| 2017 | USA Para Badminton International | (Hong Kong) Chan Ho Yuen | (South Korea) Kim Jung-jun (South Korea) Lee Sam-seop | 11–21, 16–21 | (gold) Winner |

Mixed doubles WH1–WH2
| Year | Tournament | Partner | Opponent | Score | Result |
|---|---|---|---|---|---|
| 2017 | Peru Para Badminton International | (Japan) Rie Ogura | (Brazil) Rodolfo Cano (Peru) Pilar Jáuregui | 21–10, 21–18 | (gold) Winner |
| 2017 | USA Para Badminton International | (Japan) Yuma Yamazaki | (South Korea) Kim Jung-jun (South Korea) Kang Jung-kum | 21–18, 8–21, 16–21 | (silver) Runner-up |
| 2018 | Spanish Para Badminton International | (Japan) Yuma Yamazaki | (Thailand) Jakarin Homhual (Thailand) Amnouy Wetwithan | 17–21, 22–20, 21–17 | (gold) Winner |
| 2018 | Turkish Para Badminton International | (Japan) Yuma Yamazaki | (Thailand) Jakarin Homhual (Thailand) Amnouy Wetwithan | 21–9, 21–16 | (gold) Winner |
| 2018 | Thailand Para Badminton International | (Japan) Yuma Yamazaki | (South Korea) Kim Jung-jun (South Korea) Son Ok-cha | 21–12, 21–14 | (gold) Winner |
