= Lee Sam-seop =

South Korean para-badminton player (born 1970)

Personal information
- Born: 19 March 1970 (age 56) Changwon, Gyeongsangnam-do, South Korea

Sport
- Country: South Korea
- Sport: Badminton
- Handedness: Right

Men's singles WH1 Men's doubles WH1–WH2 Mixed doubles WH1–WH2
- Highest ranking: 1 (MS 30 April 2019); 1 (MD with Kim Jung-jun 25 June 2019); 3 (XD with Lee Sun-ae 1 January 2019)
- Current ranking: 13 (MS) (8 November 2022)
- BWF profile
Medal record
Men's para-badminton
Representing South Korea
Paralympic Games
Silver medal – second place	2020 Tokyo	Men's singles
World Championships
Gold medal – first place	2007 Bangkok	Men's singles
Gold medal – first place	2007 Bangkok	Men's doubles
Gold medal – first place	2009 Seoul	Men's singles
Gold medal – first place	2009 Seoul	Men's doubles
Gold medal – first place	2009 Seoul	Mixed doubles
Gold medal – first place	2011 Guatemala City	Men's singles
Gold medal – first place	2011 Guatemala City	Men's doubles
Gold medal – first place	2011 Guatemala City	Mixed doubles
Gold medal – first place	2013 Dortmund	Men's singles
Gold medal – first place	2015 Stoke Mandeville	Men's singles
Gold medal – first place	2015 Stoke Mandeville	Men's doubles
Gold medal – first place	2015 Stoke Mandeville	Mixed doubles
Gold medal – first place	2017 Ulsan	Men's singles
Gold medal – first place	2017 Ulsan	Men's doubles
Silver medal – second place	2005 Hsinchu	Men's singles
Silver medal – second place	2005 Hsinchu	Men's doubles
Silver medal – second place	2007 Bangkok	Mixed doubles
Silver medal – second place	2013 Dortmund	Men's doubles
Silver medal – second place	2013 Dortmund	Mixed doubles
Silver medal – second place	2017 Ulsan	Mixed doubles
Asian Para Games
Gold medal – first place	2010 Guangzhou	Men's singles
Silver medal – second place	2014 Incheon	Men's doubles
Silver medal – second place	2014 Incheon	Men's singles
Silver medal – second place	2014 Incheon	Mixed doubles
Bronze medal – third place	2022 Hangzhou	Men's doubles
Asian Championships
Gold medal – first place	2012 Yeoju	Men's doubles
Gold medal – first place	2016 Beijing	Men's singles
Gold medal – first place	2016 Beijing	Men's doubles
Silver medal – second place	2012 Yeoju	Men's singles
Silver medal – second place	2012 Yeoju	Mixed doubles
Bronze medal – third place	2016 Beijing	Mixed doubles

Lee Sam-seop (Korean: 이삼섭; Hanja: 李三燮, born 19 March 1970) is a South Korean paralympic badminton player. He participated at the 2020 Summer Paralympics in the badminton competition, being awarded the silver medal in the men's singles WH1 event.

== Achievements ==
=== Paralympic Games ===
Men's singles WH1

Year	Venue	Opponent	Score	Result
2020	Yoyogi National Gymnasium, Tokyo, Japan	(China) Qu Zimo	6–21, 6^{r}–11	Silver

=== World Championships ===
Men's singles WH1
Year	Venue	Opponent	Score	Result
2005	Hsinchu Municipal Gymnasium, Hsinchu, Taiwan	(Germany) Thomas Wandschneider	0–2	Silver
2007	Gymnasium 1 Bangkok, Thailand	(South Korea) Choi Jung-man	21–13, 21–11	Gold
2009	Olympic Fencing Gymnasium; Seoul, South Korea	(South Korea) Lee Yong-ho	21–8, 21–12	Gold
2011	Coliseo Deportivo; Guatemala City, Guatemala	(Germany) Thomas Wandschneider	21–14, 21–11	Gold
2013	Helmut-Körnig-Halle, Dortmund, Germany	(Thailand) Jakarin Homhual	21–10, 22–20	Gold
2015	Stoke Mandeville Stadium, Stoke Mandeville, England	(Germany) Thomas Wandschneider	21–9, 21–12	Gold
2017	Dongchun Gymnasium, Ulsan, South Korea	(China) Qu Zimo	21–10, 21–9	Gold

Men's doubles WH1–WH2

Year	Venue	Partner	Opponent	Score	Result
2005	Hsinchu Municipal Gymnasium, Hsinchu, Taiwan	(South Korea) Choi Jung-man	(Germany) Avni Kertmen (Germany) Thomas Wandschneider	0–2	Silver
2007	Gymnasium 1, Bangkok, Thailand	(South Korea) Choi Jung-man	(Turkey) Avni Kertmen (Germany) Thomas Wandschneider	21–17, 21–16	Gold
2009	Olympic Fencing Gymnasium, Seoul, South Korea	(South Korea) Lee Yong-ho	(Japan) Hiroki Fujino (Japan) Mitsuyoshi Noine	21–7, 21–7	Gold
2009	Olympic Fencing Gymnasium, Seoul, South Korea	(South Korea) Lee Yong-ho	(Japan) Osamu Nagashima (Japan) Tsutomu Shimada	21–16, 21–14	Gold
2009	Olympic Fencing Gymnasium, Seoul, South Korea	(South Korea) Lee Yong-ho	(Turkey) Avni Kertmen (France) David Toupé	19–21, 21–9, 21–8	Gold
2009	Olympic Fencing Gymnasium, Seoul, South Korea	(South Korea) Lee Yong-ho	Shalom Kalvansky; Shimon Shalom	21–5, 21–6	Gold
2011	Coliseo Deportivo, Guatemala City, Guatemala	(South Korea) Shim Jae-yeol	(Israel) Amir Levi (Israel) Makbel Shefanya	21–18, 21–15	Gold
2013	Helmut-Körnig-Halle, Dortmund, Germany	(Turkey) Avni Kertmen	(France) David Toupé (Germany) Thomas Wandschneider	10–21, 16–21	Silver
2015	Stoke Mandeville Stadium, Stoke Mandeville, England	(South Korea) Kim Kyung-hoon	(South Korea) Kim Jung-jun (South Korea) Lee Dong-seop	21–17, 19–21, 26–14	Gold
2017	Dongchun Gymnasium, Ulsan, South Korea	(South Korea) Kim Jung-jun	(South Korea) Choi Jung-man (South Korea) Kim Sung-hun	16–21, 21–10, 21–8	Gold

Mixed doubles WH1–WH2
Year	Venue	Partner	Opponent	Score	Result
2007	Gymnasium 1 Bangkok, Thailand	(South Korea) Lee Ae-kyung	(South Korea) Choi Jung-man (South Korea) Lee Mi-ok	21–18, 21–16, 18–21	Silver
2009	Olympic Fencing Gymnasium; Seoul, South Korea	(South Korea) Lee Mi-ok	(Japan) Osamu Nagashima (Japan) Midori Shimada	21–14, 22–20	Gold
2011	Coliseo Deportivo; Guatemala City, Guatemala	(South Korea) Son Ok-cha	(France) David Toupé (Switzerland) Sonja Häsler	21–17, 21–16	Gold
2013	Helmut-Körnig-Halle; Dortmund, Germany	(South Korea) Son Ok-cha	(Thailand) Jakarin Homhual (Thailand) Sujirat Pookkham	15–21, 20–22	Silver
2015	Stoke Mandeville Stadium; Stoke Mandeville, England	(South Korea) Kim Yun-sim	(Thailand) Jakarin Homhual (Thailand) Amnouy Wetwithan	23–21, 21–17	Gold
2017	Dongchun Gymnasium; Ulsan, South Korea	(South Korea) Lee Sun-ae	(Thailand) Jakarin Homhual (Thailand) Amnouy Wetwithan	14–21, 21–19, 18–21	Silver

=== Asian Para Games ===
Men's singles WH1
Year	Venue	Opponent	Score	Result
2010	Tianhe Gymnasium; Guangzhou, China	(South Korea) Choi Jung-man	21–7, 22–24, 21–12	Gold
2014	Gyeyang Gymnasium; Incheon, South Korea	(South Korea) Choi Jung-man	18–21, 21–18, 18–21	Silver

Men's doubles WH1–WH2

Year	Venue	Partner	Opponent	Score	Result
2014	Gyeyang Gymnasium, Incheon, South Korea	(South Korea) Kim Kyung-hoon	(South Korea) Choi Jung-man (South Korea) Kim Sung-hun	21–13, 20–22, 17–21	Silver
2014	Gyeyang Gymnasium, Incheon, South Korea	(South Korea) Kim Kyung-hoon	(Japan) Osamu Nagashima (Japan) Seiji Yamami	21–12, 21–12	Silver
2014	Gyeyang Gymnasium, Incheon, South Korea	(South Korea) Kim Kyung-hoon	(Vietnam) Trần Mai Anh (Vietnam) Trương Ngọc Bình	21–12, 21–16	Silver
2014	Gyeyang Gymnasium, Incheon, South Korea	(South Korea) Kim Kyung-hoon	(Thailand) Jakarin Homhual (Thailand) Dumnern Junthong	21–13, 21–14	Silver
2022	Binjiang Gymnasium, Hangzhou, China	(South Korea) Yu Soo-young	(China) Mai Jianpeng (China) Qu Zimo	9–21, 12–21	Bronze

Mixed doubles WH1–WH2
Year	Venue	Partner	Opponent	Score	Result
2014	Gyeyang Gymnasium; Incheon, South Korea	(South Korea) Lee Sun-ae	(Thailand) Jakarin Homhual (Thailand) Amnouy Wetwithan	16–21, 15–21	Silver

=== Asian Championships ===
Men's singles WH1
Year	Venue	Opponent	Score	Result
2012	Yeoju Sports Center, Yeoju, South Korea	(South Korea) Kim Jung-jun	21–10, 15–21, 11–21	Silver
2016	China Administration of Sport for Persons with Disabilities; Beijing, China	(South Korea) Lee Dong-seop	21–19, 21–19	Gold

Men's doubles WH1–WH2

Year	Venue	Partner	Opponent	Score	Result
2012 (Note: This tournament uses a round robin system.)	Yeoju Sports Center, Yeoju, South Korea	(South Korea) Kim Jung-jun	(Chinese Taipei) Fang Chih-tsung (Chinese Taipei) Ong Yu-yu	21–6, 21–1	Gold
2012	Yeoju Sports Center, Yeoju, South Korea	(South Korea) Kim Jung-jun	(Japan) Osamu Nagashima (Japan) Tsutomu Shimada	21–9, 21–12	Gold
2012	Yeoju Sports Center, Yeoju, South Korea	(South Korea) Kim Jung-jun	(Thailand) Jakarin Homhual (Thailand) Chatchai Kornpeekanok	21–8, 21–12	Gold
2016	China Administration of Sport for Persons with Disabilities, Beijing, China	(South Korea) Kim Jung-jun	(South Korea) Kim Kyung-hoon (South Korea) Lee Dong-seop	17–21, 16–21	Silver

Mixed doubles WH1–WH2

Year	Venue	Partner	Opponent	Score	Result
2012	Yeo-ju Sports Center, Yeoju, South Korea	(South Korea) Lee Mi-ok	(South Korea) Kim Jung-jun (South Korea) Son Ok-cha	15–21, 17–21	Silver
2012	Yeo-ju Sports Center, Yeoju, South Korea	(South Korea) Lee Mi-ok	(Japan) Hiroki Fujino (Japan) Midori Shimada	21–8, 21–5	Silver
2012	Yeo-ju Sports Center, Yeoju, South Korea	(South Korea) Lee Mi-ok	(Thailand) Chatchai Kornpeekanok (Thailand) Piyawan Thinjun	21–12, 21–15	Silver
2012	Yeo-ju Sports Center, Yeoju, South Korea	(South Korea) Lee Mi-ok	(Thailand) Jakarin Homhual (Thailand) Sujirat Pookkham	18–21, 21–13, 21–16	Silver
2016	China Administration of Sport for Persons with Disabilities, Beijing, China	(South Korea) Kim Yun-sim	(South Korea) Lee Dong-seop (South Korea) Lee Sun-ae	12–21, 19–21	Bronze

=== BWF Para Badminton World Circuit (1 title, 2 runner-up) ===
The BWF Para Badminton World Circuit – Grade 2, Level 1, 2 and 3 tournaments has been sanctioned by the Badminton World Federation from 2022.

Men's singles WH1
Year	Tournament	Level	Opponent	Score	Result
2024	Spanish Para-Badminton International	Level 1	(South Korea) Choi Jung-man	12–21, 10–21	(silver) Runner-up

Men's doubles WH1–WH2
Year	Tournament	Level	Partner	Opponent	Score	Result
2022	Canada Para-Badminton International	Level 1	(South Korea) Kim Kyung-hoon	(South Korea) Jeong Jae-gun (South Korea) Kim Jung-jun	22–20, 11–21, 21–18	(gold) Winner
2024	Indonesia Para-Badminton International	Level 2	(South Korea) Kim Kyung-hoon	(South Korea) Kim Jung-jun (South Korea) Ryu Dong-hyun	20–22, 21–17, 20–22	(silver) Runner-up

=== International tournaments (2011–2021) (21 titles, 12 runners-up) ===
Men's singles WH1
Year	Tournament	Opponent	Score	Result
2012	Spanish Para-Badminton International	(South Korea) Choi Jung-man	21–15, 21–19	(gold) Winner
2013	Spanish Para-Badminton International	(South Korea) Kim Jung-jun	19–21, 21–18, 16–21	(silver) Runner-up
2014	England Para-Badminton Championships	(Thailand) Jakarin Homhual	21–16, 21–8	(gold) Winner
2015	China Para-Badminton International	(South Korea) Jeong Jae-gun	16–21, 21–16, 21–13	(gold) Winner
2016	Irish Para-Badminton International	(Germany) Thomas Wandschneider	21–15, 21–15	(gold) Winner
2017	Spanish Para-Badminton International	(South Korea) Choi Jung-man	13–21, 21–18, 11–21	(gold) Winner
2017	Irish Para-Badminton International	(France) David Toupé	11–2 retired	(gold) Winner
2017	USA Para-Badminton International	(South Korea) Lee Dong-seop	21–16, 21–23, 11–21	(silver) Runner-up
2018	Spanish Para-Badminton International	(South Korea) Choi Jung-man	17–21, 9–21	(silver) Runner-up
2018	Japan Para-Badminton International	(South Korea) Jeong Jae-gun	14–21, 17–21	(silver) Runner-up
2019	Irish Para-Badminton International	(South Korea) Jeong Jae-gun	21–19, 17–21, 21–17	(gold) Winner
2019	Thailand Para-Badminton International	(South Korea) Lee Dong-seop	16–21, 21–17, 21–17	(gold) Winner
2020	Brazil Para-Badminton International	(South Korea) Jeong Jae-gun	23–21, 21–17	(gold) Winner
2020	Peru Para-Badminton International	(South Korea) Lee Dong-seop	19–21, 11–21	(silver) Runner-up

Men's doubles WH1–WH2

Year	Tournament	Partner	Opponent	Score	Result
2012	Spanish Para-Badminton International	(South Korea) Choi Jung-man	(Turkey) Avni Kertmen (Germany) Thomas Wandschneider	21–13, 21–17	(gold) Winner
2013	Spanish Para-Badminton International	(South Korea) Kim Jung-jun	(France) Sébastien Martin (Japan) Seiji Yamami	21–9, 21–8	(gold) Winner
2013	Spanish Para-Badminton International	(South Korea) Kim Jung-jun	(Spain) Javier Fernández (Spain) Roberto Galdos	21–11, 21–8	(gold) Winner
2013	Spanish Para-Badminton International	(South Korea) Kim Jung-jun	(France) David Toupé (Germany) Thomas Wandschneider	21–11, 21–14	(gold) Winner
2014	England Para Badminton Championships	(South Korea) Kim Jung-jun	(Hong Kong) Chan Ho Yuen (Thailand) Jakarin Homhual	21–15, 21–8	(gold) Winner
2015	China Para-Badminton International	(South Korea) Kim Kyung-hoon	(Hong Kong) Chan Ho Yuen (France) David Toupé	21–10, 21–14	(gold) Winner
2016	Irish Para-Badminton International	(South Korea) Kim Jung-jun	(France) David Toupé (Germany) Thomas Wandschneider	21–14, 21–9	(gold) Winner
2017	Spanish Para-Badminton International	(South Korea) Kim Kyung-hoon	(South Korea) Choi Jung-man (South Korea) Kim Jung-jun	14–21, 15–21	(silver) Runner-up
2017	Thailand Para-Badminton International	(South Korea) Kim Jung-jun	(South Korea) Kim Kyung-hoon (South Korea) Lee Dong-seop	21–16, 21–12	(gold) Winner
2017	Irish Para-Badminton International	(South Korea) Kim Kyung-hoon	(Hong Kong) Chan Ho Yuen (Germany) Thomas Wandschneider	21–19, 21–17	(gold) Winner
2017	Japan Para-Badminton International	(South Korea) Kim Kyung-hoon	(South Korea) Choi Jung-man (South Korea) Kim Jung-jun	16–21, 21–18, 21–19	(gold) Winner
2017	USA Para-Badminton International	(South Korea) Kim Jung-jun	(Hong Kong) Chan Ho Yuen (Japan) Osamu Nagashima	21–11, 21–16	(gold) Winner
2018	Spanish Para-Badminton International	(South Korea) Jeong Jae-gun	(South Korea) Choi Jung-man (South Korea) Kim Jung-jun	21–16, 11–21, 12–21	(silver) Runner-up
2018	Japan Para-Badminton International	(South Korea) Jeong Jae-gun	(South Korea) Kim Sung-hun (France) David Toupé	17–21, 22–20, 13–21	(silver) Runner-up
2019	Turkish Para-Badminton International	(South Korea) Kim Jung-jun	(China) Mai Jianpeng (China) Qu Zimo	11–21, 21–18, 14–21	(silver) Runner-up
2019	Irish Para-Badminton International	(South Korea) Kim Jung-jun	(Thailand) Chatchai Kornpeekanok (Thailand) Aphichat Sumpradit	21–13, 21–6	(gold) Winner
2019	Thailand Para-Badminton International	(South Korea) Kim Jung-jun	(South Korea) Jeong Jae-gun (South Korea) Kim Kyung-hoon	19–21, 21–11, 24–22	(gold) Winner
2021	Spanish Para-Badminton International	(South Korea) Kim Kyung-hoon	(South Korea) Kim Jung-jun (South Korea) Lee Dong-seop	12–21, 15–21	(silver) Runner-up

Mixed doubles WH1–WH2
Year	Tournament	Partner	Opponent	Score	Result
2016	Irish Para-Badminton International	(Japan) Yuma Yamazaki	(Hong Kong) Chan Ho Yuen (Israel) Nina Gorodetzky	17–21, 15–21	(silver) Runner-up
2017	Thailand Para-Badminton International	(South Korea) Lee Sun-ae	(South Korea) Lee Dong-seop (South Korea) Kim Yun-sim	21–15, 19–21, 14–21	(silver) Runner-up
2018	Japan Para-Badminton International	(Japan) Yuma Yamazaki	(Japan) Hiroshi Murayama (Japan) Rie Ogura	19–21, 21–14, 21–15	(gold) Winner
