= Jakarin Homhual =

Thai para-badminton player (born 1988)

Personal information
- Born: 19 September 1988 (age 38) Prachuap Khiri Khan, Thailand

Sport
- Country: Thailand
- Sport: Badminton
- Handedness: Right

Men's singles WH1 Men's doubles WH1–WH2 Mixed doubles WH1–WH2
- Highest ranking: 11 (MS 6 April 2019); 4 (MD with Dumnern Junthong 1 January 2019); 1 (XD with Amnouy Wetwithan 1 January 2019)
- Current ranking: 28 (MS); 9 (MD with Dumnern Junthong); 20 (XD with Amnouy Wetwithan) (17 September 2024)
Medal record
Men's para-badminton
Representing Thailand
World Championships
Gold medal – first place	2013 Dortmund	Mixed doubles
Gold medal – first place	2017 Ulsan	Mixed doubles
Silver medal – second place	2009 Seoul	Men's doubles
Silver medal – second place	2013 Dortmund	Men's singles
Silver medal – second place	2015 Stoke Mandeville	Mixed doubles
Silver medal – second place	2019 Basel	Mixed doubles
Bronze medal – third place	2015 Stoke Mandeville	Men's singles
Bronze medal – third place	2017 Ulsan	Men's doubles
Bronze medal – third place	2024 Pattaya	Men's doubles
Asian Para Games
Gold medal – first place	2014 Incheon	Mixed doubles
Bronze medal – third place	2014 Incheon	Men's singles
Bronze medal – third place	2014 Incheon	Men's doubles
Bronze medal – third place	2018 Jakarta	Men's doubles
Bronze medal – third place	2022 Hangzhou	Mixed doubles
Asian Championships
Gold medal – first place	2016 Beijing	Mixed doubles
Silver medal – second place	2012 Yeoju	Men's doubles
Bronze medal – third place	2012 Yeoju	Men's singles
Bronze medal – third place	2016 Beijing	Men's doubles
ASEAN Para Games
Gold medal – first place	2011 Surakarta	Men's singles
Gold medal – first place	2011 Surakarta	Men's doubles
Gold medal – first place	2015 Singapore	Men's singles
Gold medal – first place	2015 Singapore	Men's doubles
Gold medal – first place	2017 Kuala Lumpur	Men's singles
Gold medal – first place	2023 Cambodia	Mixed doubles
Gold medal – first place	2023 Cambodia	Men's team
Silver medal – second place	2009 Kuala Lumpur	Mixed doubles
Silver medal – second place	2017 Kuala Lumpur	Men's doubles
Silver medal – second place	2023 Cambodia	Men's singles
Silver medal – second place	2023 Cambodia	Men's doubles
Bronze medal – third place	2009 Kuala Lumpur	Men's singles
Bronze medal – third place	2009 Kuala Lumpur	Men's doubles
Bronze medal – third place	2008 Nakhon Ratchasima	Men's singles
Bronze medal – third place	2008 Nakhon Ratchasima	Men's doubles
Bronze medal – third place	2008 Nakhon Ratchasima	Mixed doubles

Jakarin Homhual (Thai: จักรินทร์ หอมหวล; born 19 September 1988) is a Thai para-badminton player. Partnered with Dumnern Junthong, he reached the semi-finals of the men's doubles WH1–WH2 event at the 2020 Summer Paralympics in Tokyo. The duo finished in fourth place.

== Biography ==
Jakarin was diagnosed with a spinal disc herniation when he was 5–6 months old. In 2006, he was introduced into para-badminton by Pipat Chantarapaichit, a leading referee for disabled sports in Thailand.

== Achievements ==
=== World Championships ===
Men's singles WH1
Year	Venue	Opponent	Score	Result
2013	Helmut-Körnig-Halle, Dortmund, Germany	(South Korea) Lee Sam-seop	10–21, 20–22	Silver
2015	Stoke Mandeville Stadium, Stoke Mandeville, England	(Germany) Thomas Wandschneider	21–19, 11–21, 19–21	Bronze

Men's doubles WH1–WH2
Year	Venue	Partner	Opponent	Score	Result
2009	Olympic Fencing Gymnasium; Seoul, South Korea	(Thailand) Dumnern Junthong	(South Korea) Kim Sung-hun (South Korea) Shim Jae-yeol	8–21, 11–21	Silver
2017	Dongchun Gymnasium; Ulsan, South Korea	(Thailand) Dumnern Junthong	(South Korea) Kim Jung-jun (South Korea) Lee Sam-seop	16–21, 13–21	Bronze
2024	Pattaya Exhibition and Convention Hall, Pattaya, Thailand	(Thailand) Dumnern Junthong	(Malaysia) Noor Azwan Noorlan (Malaysia) Muhammad Ikhwan Ramli	19–21, 17–21	Bronze

Mixed doubles WH1–WH2
Year	Venue	Partner	Opponent	Score	Result
2013	Helmut-Körnig-Halle; Dortmund, Germany	(Thailand) Sujirat Pookkham	(South Korea) Lee Sam-seop (South Korea) Son Ok-cha	21–15, 22–20	Gold
2015	Stoke Mandeville Stadium; Stoke Mandeville, England	(Thailand) Amnouy Wetwithan	(South Korea) Lee Sam-seop (South Korea) Kim Yun-sim	21–23, 17–21	Silver
2017	Dongchun Gymnasium; Ulsan, South Korea	(Thailand) Amnouy Wetwithan	(South Korea) Lee Sam-seop (South Korea) Lee Sun-ae	21–14, 19–21, 21–18	Gold
2019	St. Jakobshalle; Basel, Switzerland	(Thailand) Amnouy Wetwithan	(China) Yang Tong (China) Li Hongyan	15–21, 21–19, 16–21	Bronze

=== Asian Para Games ===
Men's singles WH1
Year	Venue	Opponent	Score	Result
2014	Gyeyang Gymnasium; Incheon, South Korea	(South Korea) Lee Sam-seop	16–21, 18–21	Bronze

Men's doubles WH1–WH2

Year	Venue	Partner	Opponent	Score	Result
2014	Gyeyang Gymnasium, Incheon, South Korea	(Thailand) Dumnern Junthong	(Japan) Osamu Nagashima (Japan) Seiji Yamami	21–10, 21–16	Bronze
2014	Gyeyang Gymnasium, Incheon, South Korea	(Thailand) Dumnern Junthong	(Vietnam) Trần Mai Anh (Vietnam) Trương Ngọc Bình	21–18, 21–13	Bronze
2014	Gyeyang Gymnasium, Incheon, South Korea	(Thailand) Dumnern Junthong	(South Korea) Choi Jung-man (South Korea) Kim Sung-hun	11–21, 12–21	Bronze
2014	Gyeyang Gymnasium, Incheon, South Korea	(Thailand) Dumnern Junthong	(South Korea) Kim Kyung-hoon (South Korea) Lee Sam-seop	13–21, 14–21	Bronze
2018	Istora Gelora Bung Karno, Jakarta, Indonesia	(Thailand) Dumnern Junthong	(South Korea) Kim Jung-jun (South Korea) Lee Dong-seop	13–21, 11–21	Bronze

Mixed doubles WH1–WH2
Year	Venue	Partner	Opponent	Score	Result
2014	Gyeyang Gymnasium; Incheon, South Korea	(Thailand) Amnouy Wetwithan	(South Korea) Lee Sam-seop (South Korea) Lee Sun-ae	21–16, 21–15	Gold
2022	Binjiang Gymnasium; Hangzhou, China	(Thailand) Amnouy Wetwithan	(China) Qu Zimo (China) Liu Yutong	2–21, 8–21	Bronze

=== Asian Championships ===
Men's singles WH1
Year	Venue	Opponent	Score	Result
2012	Yeoju Sports Center, Yeoju, South Korea	(South Korea) Kim Jung-jun	9–21, 5–21	Bronze

Men's doubles WH1–WH2

Year	Venue	Partner	Opponent	Score	Result
2012	Yeoju Sports Center, Yeoju, South Korea	(Thailand) Chatchai Kornpeekanok	(Japan) Osamu Nagashima (Japan) Tsutomu Shimada	21–19, 21–19	Silver
2012	Yeoju Sports Center, Yeoju, South Korea	(Thailand) Chatchai Kornpeekanok	(Chinese Taipei) Fang Chih-tsung (Chinese Taipei) Ong Yu-yu	21–8, 23–21	Silver
2012	Yeoju Sports Center, Yeoju, South Korea	(Thailand) Chatchai Kornpeekanok	(South Korea) Kim Jung-jun (South Korea) Lee Sam-seop	8–21, 12–21	Silver
2016	China Administration of Sport for Persons with Disabilities, Beijing, China	(Thailand) Dumnern Junthong	(South Korea) Kim Kyung-hoon (South Korea) Lee Dong-seop	8–21, 13–21	Bronze

Mixed doubles WH1–WH2

Year	Venue	Partner	Opponent	Score	Result
2012	Yeoju Sports Center, Yeoju, South Korea	(Thailand) Sujirat Pookkham	(Thailand) Chatchai Kornpeekanok (Thailand) Piyawan Thinjun	21–13, 21–14	Bronze
2012	Yeoju Sports Center, Yeoju, South Korea	(Thailand) Sujirat Pookkham	(South Korea) Kim Jung-jun (South Korea) Son Ok-cha	21–18, 9–21, 17–21	Bronze
2012	Yeoju Sports Center, Yeoju, South Korea	(Thailand) Sujirat Pookkham	(Japan) Hiroki Fujino (Japan) Midori Shimada	21–10, 21–8	Bronze
2012	Yeoju Sports Center, Yeoju, South Korea	(Thailand) Sujirat Pookkham	(South Korea) Lee Sam-seop (South Korea) Lee Mi-ok	21–18, 13–21, 16–21	Bronze
2016	China Administration of Sport for Persons with Disabilities, Beijing, China	(Thailand) Amnouy Wetwithan	(South Korea) Lee Dong-seop (South Korea) Lee Sun-ae	21–17, 20–22, 25–23	Gold

=== ASEAN Para Games ===
Men's singles WH1

Year	Venue	Opponent	Score	Result
2008	Vongchavalitkul University Gymnasium, Nakhon Ratchasima, Thailand	(Vietnam) Trương Ngọc Bình	6–21, 10–21	Bronze
2009	Axiata Arena, Kuala Lumpur, Malaysia			Bronze
2011	Sritex Sports Arena, Surakarta, Indonesia	(Vietnam) Vũ Văn Phú	21–10, 21–10	Gold
2011	Sritex Sports Arena, Surakarta, Indonesia	(Thailand) Chatchai Kornpeekanok	21–12, 21–9	Gold
2011	Sritex Sports Arena, Surakarta, Indonesia	(Thailand) Anuwat Sriboran	21–9, 21–14	Gold
2015	OCBC Arena, Singapore	(Thailand) Anuwat Sriboran	21–13, 21–11	Gold
2017	Axiata Arena, Kuala Lumpur, Malaysia	(Malaysia) Muhammad Ikhwan Ramli	21–13, 16–21, 21–14	Gold
2023	Morodok Techo Badminton Hall, Phnom Penh, Cambodia	(Malaysia) Muhammad Ikhwan Ramli	15–21, 14–21	Silver

Men's doubles WH1–WH2

Year	Venue	Partner	Opponent	Score	Result
2008	Vongchavalitkul University Gymnasium, Nakhon Ratchasima, Thailand	(Thailand) Dumnern Junthong	(Thailand) Anuwat Sriboran (Thailand) Thean Thongloy	21–5, 21–16	Bronze
2008	Vongchavalitkul University Gymnasium, Nakhon Ratchasima, Thailand	(Thailand) Dumnern Junthong	(Malaysia) Mohd Fairuz Amjad Rohaizat (Malaysia) Madzlan Saibon	22–20, 18–21, 16–21	Bronze
2008	Vongchavalitkul University Gymnasium, Nakhon Ratchasima, Thailand	(Thailand) Dumnern Junthong	(Vietnam) Phạm Quang Nhuận (Vietnam) Vũ Văn Phú	21–9, 21–13	Bronze
2008	Vongchavalitkul University Gymnasium, Nakhon Ratchasima, Thailand	(Thailand) Dumnern Junthong	(Vietnam) Trần Mai Anh (Vietnam) Trương Ngọc Bình	16–21, 12–21	Bronze
2009	Axiata Arena, Kuala Lumpur, Malaysia	(Thailand) Dumnern Junthong			Bronze
2011	Sritex Sports Arena, Surakarta, Indonesia	(Thailand) Dumnern Junthong	(Malaysia) Madzlan Saibon (Malaysia) Zarim Marzuki	21–17, 21–19	Gold
2015	OCBC Arena, Singapore	(Thailand) Dumnern Junthong	(Thailand) Chatchai Kornpeekanok (Thailand) Aphichat Sumpradit	21–16, 21–16	Gold
2015	OCBC Arena, Singapore	(Thailand) Dumnern Junthong	(Malaysia) Mohd Firdaus Mohd Nadzar (Malaysia) Zarim Marzuki	14–21, 21–13, 21–16	Gold
2015	OCBC Arena, Singapore	(Thailand) Dumnern Junthong	(Malaysia) Mohd Yusof Rahim (Malaysia) Mohd Johari Saad	21–11, 21–13	Gold
2015	OCBC Arena, Singapore	(Thailand) Dumnern Junthong	(Vietnam) Trần Mai Anh (Vietnam) Trương Ngọc Bình	23–25, 21–13, 21–17	Gold
2017	Axiata Arena, Kuala Lumpur, Malaysia	(Thailand) Dumnern Junthong	(Malaysia) Muhammad Ikhwan Ramli (Malaysia) Madzlan Saibon	20–22, 19–21	Silver
2023	Morodok Techo Badminton Hall, Phnom Penh, Cambodia	(Thailand) Dumnern Junthong	(Malaysia) Noor Azwan Noorlan (Malaysia) Muhammad Ikhwan Ramli	21–14, 17–21, 9–21	Silver

Mixed doubles WH1–WH2

Year	Venue	Partner	Opponent	Score	Result
2008	Vongchavalitkul University Gymnasium, Nakhon Ratchasima, Thailand	(Thailand) Laong Hebkaew	(Thailand) Thean Thongloy (Thailand) Piyawan Thinjun	21–16, 21–19	Bronze
2008	Vongchavalitkul University Gymnasium, Nakhon Ratchasima, Thailand	(Thailand) Laong Hebkaew	(Vietnam) Trương Ngọc Bình (Vietnam) Ứng Thị Phát Lợi	16–21, 21–18, 17–21	Bronze
2008	Vongchavalitkul University Gymnasium, Nakhon Ratchasima, Thailand	(Thailand) Laong Hebkaew	(Thailand) Dumnern Junthong (Thailand) Amnouy Wetwithan	20–22, 15–21	Bronze
2008	Vongchavalitkul University Gymnasium, Nakhon Ratchasima, Thailand	(Thailand) Laong Hebkaew	(Vietnam) Trần Mai Anh (Vietnam) Nguyễn Thị Tố Nga	2–0	Bronze
2009	Axiata Arena, Kuala Lumpur, Malaysia	(Thailand) Laong Hebkaew			Silver
2023	Morodok Techo Badminton Hall, Phnom Penh, Cambodia	(Thailand) Amnouy Wetwithan	(Thailand) Dumnern Junthong (Thailand) Sujirat Pookkham	17–21, 21–19, 21–17	Gold
2023	Morodok Techo Badminton Hall, Phnom Penh, Cambodia	(Thailand) Amnouy Wetwithan	(Vietnam) Hoàng Mạnh Giang (Vietnam) Hoàng Thị Hồng Thảo	21–13, 21–6	Gold

=== BWF Para Badminton World Circuit (1 runner-up) ===
The BWF Para Badminton World Circuit – Grade 2, Level 1, 2 and 3 tournaments has been sanctioned by the Badminton World Federation from 2022.

Men's doubles WH1–WH2
Year	Tournament	Level	Partner	Opponent	Score	Result
2023	Spanish Para-Badminton International II	Level 2	(Thailand) Dumnern Junthong	(Japan) Daiki Kajiwara (Japan) Hiroshi Murayama	8–21, 12–21	(silver) Runner-up

=== International tournaments (2011–2021) (4 titles, 9 runners-up) ===
Men's singles WH1
Year	Tournament	Opponent	Score	Result
2014	England Para-Badminton Championships	(South Korea) Lee Sam-seop	16–21, 8–21	(silver) Runner-up
2015	Indonesia Para-Badminton International	(Thailand) Chatchai Kornpeekanok	21–14, 21–13	(gold) Winner
2017	Thailand Para-Badminton International	(South Korea) Lee Dong-seop	15–21, 11–21	(silver) Runner-up

Men's doubles WH1–WH2

Year	Tournament	Partner	Opponent	Score	Result
2012	Spanish Para-Badminton International	(Thailand) Dumnern Junthong	(Macau) Ip Chi Keong (India) Madasu Srinivas Rao	21–5, 21–8	(silver) Runner-up
2012	Spanish Para-Badminton International	(Thailand) Dumnern Junthong	(Switzerland) Antonio Pires de Miranda (Switzerland) Walter Rauber	21–11, 21–16	(silver) Runner-up
2012	Spanish Para-Badminton International	(Thailand) Dumnern Junthong	(South Korea) Kim Sung-hun (South Korea) Shim Jae-yeol	16–21, 9–21	(silver) Runner-up
2012	Spanish Para-Badminton International	(Thailand) Dumnern Junthong	(France) Pascal Barrillon (France) Francois Nalborczyk	21–6, 21–6	(silver) Runner-up
2014	England Para-Badminton Championships	(Hong Kong) Chan Ho Yuen	(South Korea) Kim Jung-jun (South Korea) Lee Sam-seop	15–21, 8–21	(silver) Runner-up

Mixed doubles WH1–WH2
Year	Tournament	Partner	Opponent	Score	Result
2012	Spanish Para-Badminton International	(Thailand) Sujirat Pookkham	(France) David Toupé (Switzerland) Sonja Häsler	15–21, 21–16, 18–21	(silver) Runner-up
2014	England Para-Badminton Championships	(Thailand) Sujirat Pookkham	(England) Martin Rooke (Switzerland) Karin Suter-Erath	14–21, 14–21	(silver) Runner-up
2015	Indonesia Para-Badminton International	(Thailand) Amnouy Wetwithan	(Hong Kong) Chan Ho Yuen (Switzerland) Karin Suter-Erath	19–21, 21–11, 23–21	(gold) Winner
2016	Indonesia Para-Badminton International	(Thailand) Amnouy Wetwithan	(Thailand) Dumnern Junthong (Thailand) Sujirat Pookkham	21–14, 26–28, 21–17	(gold) Winner
2017	Irish Para-Badminton International	(Thailand) Amnouy Wetwithan	(Thailand) Dumnern Junthong (Thailand) Sujirat Pookkham	21–9, 22–20	(gold) Winner
2017	Japan Para-Badminton International	(Thailand) Amnouy Wetwithan	(South Korea) Kim Jung-jun (South Korea) Kim Seung-suk	15–21, 22–24	(silver) Runner-up
2018	Spanish Para-Badminton International	(Thailand) Amnouy Wetwithan	(Japan) Osamu Nagashima (Japan) Yuma Yamazaki	21–17, 20–22, 17–21	(silver) Runner-up
2018	Turkish Para-Badminton International	(Thailand) Amnouy Wetwithan	(Japan) Osamu Nagashima (Japan) Yuma Yamazaki	9–21, 16–21	(silver) Runner-up
