= Hiroshi Murayama =

Japanese para badminton player

Hiroshi Murayama 村山 浩
Personal information
- Born: 25 March 1974 (age 52) Chiba, Chiba Prefecture, Japan

Sport
- Country: Japan
- Sport: Badminton

Men's singles WH1 Men's doubles WH1–WH2
- Highest ranking: 2 (MS 19 July 2022); 1 (MD with Daiki Kajiwara 24 October 2023)
- Current ranking: 10 (MS); 5 (MD with Daiki Kajiwara) (3 September 2024)
- BWF profile
Medal record
Men's para badminton
Representing Japan
Paralympic Games
Bronze medal – third place	2020 Tokyo	Men's doubles
Bronze medal – third place	2024 Paris	Men's doubles

Hiroshi Murayama (村山 浩, Murayama Hiroshi; born 25 March 1974) is a Japanese para badminton player. He participated at the 2020 Summer Paralympics in the badminton competition, winning the bronze medal in the men's doubles WH1–WH2 event with his teammate, Daiki Kajiwara.

== Achievements ==
=== Paralympic Games ===
Men's doubles WH1–WH2

Year	Venue	Partner	Opponent	Score	Result
2020	Yoyogi National Gymnasium, Tokyo, Japan	(Japan) Daiki Kajiwara	(Thailand) Jakarin Homhual (Thailand) Dumnern Junthong	21–18, 21–19	Bronze
2024	Porte de La Chapelle Arena, Paris, France	(Japan) Daiki Kajiwara	(Japan) Takumi Matsumoto (Japan) Osamu Nagashima	19–21, 21–12, 21–15	Bronze

=== BWF Para Badminton World Circuit (7 titles, 6 runners-up) ===
The BWF Para Badminton World Circuit – Grade 2, Level 1, 2 and 3 tournaments has been sanctioned by the Badminton World Federation from 2022.

Men's singles WH1
Year	Tournament	Level	Opponent	Score	Result
2022	Brazil Para-Badminton International	Level 2	(India) Prem Kumar Ale	21–18, 21–14	(gold) Winner
2022	Canada Para-Badminton International	Level 1	(South Korea) Jeong Jae-gun	10–21, 10–21	(silver) Runner-up
2022	4 Nations Para-Badminton International	Level 1	(Malaysia) Muhammad Ikhwan Ramli	21–10, 21–14	(gold) Winner
2023	Spanish Para-Badminton International II	Level 2	(South Korea) Choi Jung-man	20–22, 19–21	(silver) Runner-up
2023	Spanish Para-Badminton International I	Level 1	(South Korea) Choi Jung-man	18–21, 21–19, 21–11	(gold) Winner
2023	Brazil Para-Badminton International	Level 2	(South Korea) Choi Jung-man	15–21, 21–16, 16–21	(silver) Runner-up
2023	Canada Para-Badminton International	Level 1	(South Korea) Choi Jung-man	25–27, 21–17, 21–19	(gold) Winner

Men's doubles WH1–WH2
Year	Tournament	Level	Partner	Opponent	Score	Result
2023	Spanish Para-Badminton International II	Level 2	(Japan) Daiki Kajiwara	(Thailand) Jakarin Homhual (Thailand) Dumnern Junthong	21–8, 21–12	(gold) Winner
2023	Spanish Para-Badminton International I	Level 1	(Japan) Daiki Kajiwara	(South Korea) Choi Jung-man (South Korea) Kim Jung-jun	18–21, 19–21	(silver) Runner-up
2023	Brazil Para-Badminton International	Level 2	(Japan) Daiki Kajiwara	(India) Prem Kumar Ale (India) Abu Hubaida	21–3, 21–17	(gold) Winner
2023	Bahrain Para-Badminton International	Level 2	(Japan) Daiki Kajiwara	(China) Mai Jianpeng (China) Qu Zimo	7–21, 10–21	(silver) Runner-up
2023	Canada Para-Badminton International	Level 1	(Japan) Daiki Kajiwara	(South Korea) Choi Jung-man (South Korea) Kim Jung-jun	21–11, 17–21, 21–16	(gold) Winner
2023	4 Nations Para-Badminton International	Level 1	(Japan) Daiki Kajiwara	(South Korea) Choi Jung-man (South Korea) Kim Jung-jun	18–21, 21–19, 16–21	(silver) Runner-up
2024	4 Nations Para-Badminton International	Level 1	(Japan) Daiki Kajiwara	(South Korea) Jeong Jae-gun (South Korea) Yu Soo-young	14–21, 14–21	(silver) Runner-up

=== International tournaments (2011–2021) (7 titles, 7 runners-up) ===
Men's singles WH1
Year	Tournament	Opponent	Score	Result
2016	Colombia Para-Badminton International	(Japan) Kouhei Kobayashi	21–11, 22–20	(gold) Winner
2017	Peru Para-Badminton International	(Japan) Osamu Nagashima	14–21, 16–21	(silver) Runner-up
2018	Brazil Para-Badminton International	(Japan) Mamoru Oe	21–12, 21–13	(gold) Winner
2018	Australia Para-Badminton International	(South Korea) Choi Jung-man	16–21, 12–21	(silver) Runner-up
2019	Denmark Para-Badminton International	(Japan) Osamu Nagashima	13–21, 21–11, 21–9	(gold) Winner

Men's doubles WH1–WH2
Year	Tournament	Partner	Opponent	Score	Result
2017	Peru Para-Badminton International	(Japan) Osamu Nagashima	(Japan) Kouhei Kobayashi (Japan) Atsuya Watanabe	21–11, 21–14	(gold) Winner
2018	Brazil Para-Badminton International	(Japan) Kouhei Kobayashi	(Brazil) Marcelo Alves Conceição (Brazil) Julio César Godoy	21–15, 21–7	(gold) Winner
2019	Dubai Para-Badminton International	(Japan) Daiki Kajiwara	(South Korea) Jeong Jae-gun (South Korea) Kim Kyung-hoon	17–21, 7–21	(silver) Runner-up
2019	Denmark Para-Badminton International	(Japan) Daiki Kajiwara	(Germany) Young-chin Mi (Germany) Thomas Wandschneider	21–12, 21–9	(gold) Winner
2020	Brazil Para-Badminton International	(Japan) Daiki Kajiwara	(China) Mai Jianpeng (China) Qu Zimo	12–21, 19–21	(silver) Runner-up
2020	Peru Para-Badminton International	(Japan) Daiki Kajiwara	(South Korea) Kim Jung-jun (South Korea) Lee Dong-seop	20–22, 21–15, 18–21	(silver) Runner-up

Mixed doubles WH1–WH2
Year	Tournament	Partner	Opponent	Score	Result
2018	Brazil Para-Badminton International	(Japan) Rie Ogura	(Israel) Amir Levi (Israel) Nina Gorodetzky	17–21, 21–19, 21–14	(gold) Winner
2018	Japan Para-Badminton International	(Japan) Rie Ogura	(South Korea) Lee Sam-seop (Japan) Yuma Yamazaki	21–19, 14–21, 15–21	(silver) Runner-up
2018	Australia Para-Badminton International	(Japan) Rie Ogura	(South Korea) Kim Jung-jun (South Korea) Kim Seung-suk	21–11, 14–21, 18–21	(silver) Runner-up
