= 2004 Asian Paralympic Badminton Championships =

Tournament details
- Dates: 14–18 July 2004
- Edition: 1st
- Venue: Stadium Titiwangsa
- Location: Kuala Lumpur, Malaysia

The 2004 Asian Paralympic Badminton Championships (Malay: Kejohanan Badminton Paralimpik Asia 2004) was a para-badminton tournament hosted and organized by the International Badminton Association for the Disabled (IBAD) and the Malaysian Paralympic Council to crown the best para-badminton players in Asia.

The tournament was held from 14 to 18 July at Stadium Titiwangsa in Kuala Lumpur, Malaysia. Ten countries competed in the tournament, with 13 events being contested in the tournament.

== Medalists ==
=== Men's events ===
Event	Gold	Silver	Bronze
Singles BMW2+3 (WH1–WH2)	(Malaysia) Madzlan Saibon	(Sri Lanka) Kusum Weerasinghe	(Sri Lanka) V. G. Nishantha
Singles BMW2+3 (WH1–WH2)	(Malaysia) Madzlan Saibon	(Sri Lanka) Kusum Weerasinghe	(Japan) Osamu Nagashima
Singles BMSTL1 (SL3)	(Malaysia) Jasmi Tegol	(Malaysia) Radhi Juhari	(Chinese Taipei) Hsu Jen-ho
Singles BMSTL1 (SL3)	(Malaysia) Jasmi Tegol	(Malaysia) Radhi Juhari	(Japan) Koji Hemmi
Singles BMSTL2 (SL4)	(Chinese Taipei) Chuang Liang-tu	(Japan) Takahito Takeyama	(Malaysia) Ahmad Abdul Rahman
Singles BMSTL2 (SL4)	(Chinese Taipei) Chuang Liang-tu	(Japan) Takahito Takeyama	(Thailand) Adisak Saengarayakul
Singles BMSTU5 (SU5b)	(Malaysia) Cheah Liek Hou	(Hong Kong) Jeffrey Zee	(Chinese Taipei) Hsu Chi-tsung
Singles BMSTU5 (SU5b)	(Malaysia) Cheah Liek Hou	(Hong Kong) Jeffrey Zee	(Chinese Taipei) Lee Meng-yuan
Doubles BMW2+3 (WH1–WH2)	(Malaysia) Madzlan Saibon (Malaysia) Zulkafli Shaari	(Sri Lanka) V. G. Nishantha (Sri Lanka) Kusum Weerasinghe	(Japan) Yukiya Kusunose (Japan) Osamu Nagashima
Doubles BMW2+3 (WH1–WH2)	(Malaysia) Madzlan Saibon (Malaysia) Zulkafli Shaari	(Sri Lanka) V. G. Nishantha (Sri Lanka) Kusum Weerasinghe	(India) Madasu Srinivas Rao (India) Satya Prakash Tiwari
Doubles BMSTL1 (SL3)	(Malaysia) Jasmi Tegol (Malaysia) Radhi Juhari	(Pakistan) Shahid Hussain (Pakistan) Ali Rafique Muhammad	(Chinese Taipei) Hsu Jen-ho (Chinese Taipei) Huang Yu-jen
Doubles BMSTL1 (SL3)	(Malaysia) Jasmi Tegol (Malaysia) Radhi Juhari	(Pakistan) Shahid Hussain (Pakistan) Ali Rafique Muhammad	(Malaysia) Azmin Ali (Malaysia) Yau Tiam Ann
Doubles BMSTL2 (SL4)	(Chinese Taipei) Chuang Liang-tu (Chinese Taipei) Chiang Chung-hou	(South Korea) Baek Dong-gyu (South Korea) Jun Dong-chun	(India) Anand Kumar Boregowda (India) Raghuram Samaduraja
Doubles BMSTL2 (SL4)	(Chinese Taipei) Chuang Liang-tu (Chinese Taipei) Chiang Chung-hou	(South Korea) Baek Dong-gyu (South Korea) Jun Dong-chun	(Malaysia) Hairol Fozi Saaba (Malaysia) Suhaili Laiman
Doubles BMSTU5 (SU5b)	(Malaysia) Cheah Liek Hou (Malaysia) Razali Jaafar	(Japan) Tetsuo Ura (Japan) Hironobu Kawabata	(Hong Kong) Wong Shu Yuen (Hong Kong) Jeffrey Zee
Doubles BMSTU5 (SU5b)	(Malaysia) Cheah Liek Hou (Malaysia) Razali Jaafar	(Japan) Tetsuo Ura (Japan) Hironobu Kawabata	(Malaysia) Ahmad Najmuddin (Malaysia) Hamizan Mohamed
Team BMSTL1–BMSTU5 (SL3–SU5)	Chinese Taipei	Malaysia	Hong Kong
Team BMSTL1–BMSTU5 (SL3–SU5)	Chinese Taipei	Malaysia	Japan

=== Women's events ===
Event	Gold	Silver	Bronze
Singles BMW2+3 (WH1–WH2)	(Japan) Tomomi Miyama	(Japan) Midori Kagotani	(Malaysia) Chow Mei Hsia
Singles BMW2+3 (WH1–WH2)	(Japan) Tomomi Miyama	(Japan) Midori Kagotani	(Malaysia) Chen Yen Chang
Singles BMSTL2–BMSTU5 (SL3–SU5)	(India) Parul Parmar	(Hong Kong) Ma Hoi Kwan	(Hong Kong) Ng Lai Ling
Singles BMSTL2–BMSTU5 (SL3–SU5)	(India) Parul Parmar	(Hong Kong) Ma Hoi Kwan	(India) Pushpalatha T.
Doubles BMW2+3 (WH1–WH2)	(Japan) Midori Kagotari (Japan) Tomomi Miyama	(Malaysia) Chen Yen Chang (Malaysia) Chow Mei Hsia	(Malaysia) Norisah Bahrom (Malaysia) Ras Adiba Radzi
Doubles BMWSTL1–BMSTU5 (SL3–SU5)	(India) Parul Parmar (India) Pushpalatha T.	(Hong Kong) Ma Hoi Kwan (Hong Kong) Ng Lai Ling	(Malaysia) Norshariza Shaid (Malaysia) Noraimi Abdullah

== Medal table ==
* Host nation (Malaysia)

Rank	Nation	Gold	Silver	Bronze	Total
1	Malaysia*	6	3	6	15
2	Chinese Taipei	3	0	4	7
3	Japan	2	3	4	9
4	India	2	0	3	5
5	Hong Kong	0	3	3	6
6	Sri Lanka	0	2	1	3
7	Pakistan	0	1	0	1
7	South Korea	0	1	0	1
9	Thailand	0	0	1	1
Totals (9 entries)		13	13	22	48

== See also ==
- 2004 Asian Badminton Championships
