= Lee Dong-seop =

South Korean para badminton player

Personal information
- Born: 4 April 1971 (age 55) Jeju City, South Korea
- Height: 170 cm (5 ft 7 in)
- Weight: 52 kg (115 lb)

Sport
- Country: South Korea
- Sport: Badminton
- Handedness: Right

Men's singles WH1 Men's doubles WH1–WH2 Mixed doubles WH1–WH2
- Highest ranking: 1 (MS 20 May 2021); 2 (MD with Kim Jung-jun 29 August 2019); 5 (XD with Lee Sun-ae 21 November 2021)
Medal record
Men's para badminton
Representing South Korea
Paralympic Games
Bronze medal – third place	2020 Tokyo	Men's singles
Silver medal – second place	2020 Tokyo	Men's doubles
World Championships
Silver medal – second place	2015 Stoke Mandeville	Men's doubles
Silver medal – second place	2019 Basel	Men's doubles
Silver medal – second place	2019 Basel	Men's singles
Bronze medal – third place	2015 Stoke Mandeville	Men's singles
Bronze medal – third place	2017 Ulsan	Men's singles
Bronze medal – third place	2017 Ulsan	Men's doubles
Asian Para Games
Silver medal – second place	2018 Jakarta	Men's doubles
Bronze medal – third place	2018 Jakarta	Men's singles
Bronze medal – third place	2018 Jakarta	Mixed doubles
Asian Championships
Gold medal – first place	2012 Yeoju	Men's doubles
Gold medal – first place	2016 Beijing	Men's doubles
Silver medal – second place	2016 Beijing	Men's singles
Silver medal – second place	2016 Beijing	Mixed doubles
Bronze medal – third place	2012 Yeoju	Men's singles

Lee Dong-seop (Korean: 이동섭; Hanja: 李東燮; born 4 April 1971) is a South Korean para badminton player. He participated at the 2020 Summer Paralympics in the badminton competition, being awarded the bronze medal in the men's singles WH1 event. Dong-seop also participated in the men's doubles WH1–WH2 event, being awarded the silver medal with his teammate, Kim Jung-jun.

== Achievements ==
=== Paralympic Games ===
Men's singles

Year	Venue	Opponent	Score	Result
2020	Yoyogi National Gymnasium, Tokyo, Japan	(Japan) Hiroshi Murayama	22–20, 17–21, 21–14	Bronze

Men's doubles

Year	Venue	Partner	Opponent	Score	Result
2020	Yoyogi National Gymnasium, Tokyo, Japan	(South Korea) Kim Jung-jun	(China) Mai Jianpeng (China) Qu Zimo	10–21, 14–21	Silver

=== World Championships ===
Men's singles
Year	Venue	Opponent	Score	Result
2015	Stoke Mandeville Stadium, Stoke Mandeville, England	(South Korea) Lee Sam-seop	12–21, 9–21	Bronze
2017	Dongchun Gymnasium, Ulsan, South Korea	(South Korea) Lee Sam-seop	15–21, 21–17, 18–21	Bronze
2019	St. Jakobshalle; Basel, Switzerland	(China) Qu Zimo	16–21, 13–21	Silver

Men's doubles
Year	Venue	Partner	Opponent	Score	Result
2015	Stoke Mandeville Stadium; Stoke Mandeville, England	(South Korea) Kim Jung-jun	(South Korea) Kim Kyung-hoon (South Korea) Lee Sam-seop	17–21, 21–19, 24–26	Silver
2017	Dongchun Gymnasium; Ulsan, South Korea	(South Korea) Kim Kyung-hoon	(South Korea) Choi Jung-man (South Korea) Kim Sung-hun	16–21, 17–21	Bronze
2019	St. Jakobshalle; Basel, Switzerland	(South Korea) Kim Jung-jun	(China) Mai Jianpeng (China) Qu Zimo	21–18, 18–21, 15–21	Silver

=== Asian Para Games ===
Men's singles WH1
Year	Venue	Opponent	Score	Result
2018	Istora Gelora Bung Karno; Jakarta, Indonesia	(South Korea) Choi Jung-man	12–21, 21–17, 16–21	Bronze

Men's doubles WH1–WH2
Year	Venue	Partner	Opponent	Score	Result
2018	Istora Gelora Bung Karno; Jakarta, Indonesia	(South Korea) Kim Jung-jun	(China) Mai Jianpeng (China) Qu Zimo	15–21, 21–13, 17–21	Silver

Mixed doubles WH1–WH2
Year	Venue	Partner	Opponent	Score	Result
2018	Istora Gelora Bung Karno; Jakarta, Indonesia	(South Korea) Lee Sun-ae	(China) Qu Zimo (China) Liu Yutong	9–21, 14–21	Bronze

=== Asian Championships ===
Men's singles WH1
Year	Venue	Opponent	Score	Result
2012	Yeoju Sports Center, Yeoju, South Korea	(South Korea) Lee Sam-seop	15–21, 12–21	Bronze
2016	China Administration of Sport for Persons with Disabilities; Beijing, China	(South Korea) Lee Sam-seop	19–21, 19–21	Silver

Men's doubles WH1–WH2
Year	Venue	Partner	Opponent	Score	Result
2012	Yeoju Sports Center; Yeoju, South Korea	(South Korea) Shim Jae-yul	(South Korea) Kim Kyung-hoon (South Korea) Kim Sung-hun	16–21, 21–19, 21–17	Gold
2016	China Administration of Sport for Persons with Disabilities; Beijing, China	(South Korea) Kim Kyung-hoon	(South Korea) Kim Jung-jun (South Korea) Lee Sam-seop	17–21, 16–21	Silver

Mixed doubles WH1–WH2
Year	Venue	Partner	Opponent	Score	Result
2016	China Administration of Sport for Persons with Disabilities; Beijing, China	(South Korea) Lee Sun-ae	(Thailand) Jakarin Homhual (Thailand) Amnouy Wetwithan	17–21, 22–20, 23–25	Bronze

=== International tournaments (2011–2021) (12 titles, 4 runners-up) ===
Men's singles WH1
Year	Tournament	Opponent	Score	Result
2017	Thailand Para-Badminton International	(Thailand) Jakarin Homhual	21–15, 21–11	(gold) Winner
2017	Japan Para-Badminton International	(South Korea) Jeong Jae-gun	21–9, 21–11	(gold) Winner
2017	USA Para-Badminton International	(South Korea) Lee Sam-seop	16–21, 23–21, 21–11	(gold) Winner
2018	Thailand Para-Badminton International	(Germany) Thomas Wandschneider	21–9, 21–7	(gold) Winner
2019	Canada Para-Badminton International	(Germany) Thomas Wandschneider	21–13, 21–17	(gold) Winner
2019	Thailand Para-Badminton International	(South Korea) Lee Sam-seop	21–16, 17–21, 17–21	(silver) Runner-up
2020	Peru Para-Badminton International	(South Korea) Lee Sam-seop	21–19, 21–11	(gold) Winner
2021	Spanish Para-Badminton International	(Malaysia) Muhammad Ikhwan Ramli	21–13, 21–16	(gold) Winner

Men's doubles WH1–WH2
Year	Tournament	Partner	Opponent	Score	Result
2017	Thailand Para-Badminton International	(South Korea) Kim Kyung-hoon	(South Korea) Kim Jung-jun (South Korea) Lee Sam-seop	16–21, 12–21	(silver) Runner-up
2018	Thailand Para-Badminton International	(South Korea) Kim Jung-jun	(South Korea) Choi Jung-man (South Korea) Kim Kyung-hoon	19–21, 19–21	(silver) Runner-up
2019	Canada Para-Badminton International	(South Korea) Kim Jung-jun	(South Korea) Choi Jung-man (South Korea) Kim Kyung-hoon	21–10, 21–17	(gold) Winner
2019	Japan Para-Badminton International	(South Korea) Kim Jung-jun	(China) Mai Jianpeng (China) Qu Zimo	12–21, 13–21	(silver) Runner-up
2020	Peru Para-Badminton International	(South Korea) Kim Jung-jun	(Japan) Daiki Kajiwara (Japan) Hiroshi Murayama	22–20, 15–21, 21–18	(gold) Winner
2021	Spanish Para-Badminton International	(South Korea) Kim Jung-jun	(South Korea) Kim Kyung-hoon (South Korea) Lee Sam-seop	21–12, 21–15	(gold) Winner

Mixed doubles WH1–WH2
Year	Tournament	Partner	Opponent	Score	Result
2017	Thailand Para-Badminton International	(South Korea) Kim Yun-sim	(South Korea) Lee Sam-seop (South Korea) Lee Sun-ae	15–21, 21–19, 21–14	(gold) Winner
2019	Canada Para-Badminton International	(South Korea) Lee Sun-ae	(South Korea) Kim Kyung-hoon (South Korea) Kang Jung-kum	21–12, 21–16	(gold) Winner
