= Badminton at the 2024 Summer Paralympics – Men's doubles WH1–WH2 =

Badminton competition

Men's doubles WH1–WH2 at the XVII Paralympic Games
- Venue: Arena Porte de La Chapelle, Paris
- Dates: 29 August 2024 – 1 September 2024
- Competitors: 16 from 6 nations

Medalists
1st place, gold medalist(s)		Mai Jianpeng; Qu Zimo	China
2nd place, silver medalist(s)		Jeong Jae-gun; Yu Soo-young	South Korea
3rd place, bronze medalist(s)		Daiki Kajiwara; Hiroshi Murayama	Japan

The men's doubles WH1–WH2 tournament at the 2024 Summer Paralympics in France will take place between 29 August and 1 September 2024 at Arena Porte de La Chapelle.

== Classification ==
- WH1
  Players in this class are those who have impairment in both lower limbs and trunk function and require wheelchair to play
- WH2
  Players have impairment in one or both lower limbs and minimal or no impairment of the trunk and also require wheelchair

== Seeds ==
These were the seeds for this event:

1. Choi Jung-man / Kim Jung-jun (KOR) (group stage)
2. Noor Azwan Noorlan / Muhammad Ikhwan Ramli (MAS) (group stage)

== Group stage ==
The draw of the group stage revealed on 24 August 2024. The group stage will be played from 29 to 31 August. The top two winners of each group advanced to the knockout rounds.

=== Group A ===
Pos	Team	Pld	W	L	GF	GA	GD	PF	PA	PD	Pts	Qualification
1	Jeong Jae-gun (KOR) [WH1] Yu Soo-young (KOR) [WH2]	3	3	0	6	0	+6	126	86	+40	3	Semi-finals
2	Takumi Matsumoto (JPN) [WH2] Osamu Nagashima (JPN) [WH1]	3	2	1	4	3	+1	129	133	−4	2	Semi-finals
3	Choi Jung-man (KOR) [WH1] Kim Jung-jun (KOR) [WH2]	3	1	2	2	5	−3	114	138	−24	1	
4	Thomas Jakobs (FRA) [WH2] David Toupé (FRA) [WH1] (H)	3	0	3	2	6	−4	143	155	−12	0	

First match(es) will be played: 29 August 2024. Source: COJOP2024
(H) Host

Date	Time	Player 1	Score	Player 2	Set 1	Set 2	Set 3	Report
Aug 29	9:50	Choi Jung-man (South Korea); Kim Jung-jun (South Korea)	0–2	(South Korea) Jeong Jae-gun (South Korea) Yu Soo-young	14–21	13–21		Report
Aug 29	10:30	Takumi Matsumoto (Japan); Osamu Nagashima (Japan)	2–1	(France) Thomas Jakobs (France) David Toupé	15–21	21–18	22–20	Report
Aug 30	11:50	Choi Jung-man (South Korea); Kim Jung-jun (South Korea)	0–2	(Japan) Takumi Matsumoto (Japan) Osamu Nagashima	13–21	19–21		Report
Aug 30	13:10	Thomas Jakobs (France); David Toupé (France)	0–2	(South Korea) Jeong Jae-gun (South Korea) Yu Soo-young	15–21	15–21		Report
Aug 31	12:00	Choi Jung-man (South Korea); Kim Jung-jun (South Korea)	2–1	(France) Thomas Jakobs (France) David Toupé	21–18	13–21	21–15	Report
Aug 31	12:40	Takumi Matsumoto (Japan); Osamu Nagashima (Japan)	0–2	(South Korea) Jeong Jae-gun (South Korea) Yu Soo-young	16–21	13–21		Report

=== Group B ===
Pos	Team	Pld	W	L	GF	GA	GD	PF	PA	PD	Pts	Qualification
1	Mai Jianpeng (CHN) [WH2] Qu Zimo (CHN) [WH1]	3	3	0	6	0	+6	126	80	+46	3	Semi-finals
2	Daiki Kajiwara (JPN) [WH2] Hiroshi Murayama (JPN) [WH1]	3	2	1	4	3	+1	131	112	+19	2	Semi-finals
3	Noor Azwan Noorlan (MAS) [WH2] Muhammad Ikhwan Ramli (MAS) [WH1]	3	1	2	3	4	−1	114	137	−23	1	
4	Rick Cornell Hellmann (GER) [WH2] Thomas Wandschneider (GER) [WH1]	3	0	3	0	6	−6	84	126	−42	0	

First match(es) will be played: 29 August 2024. Source: COJOP2024

Date	Time	Player 1	Score	Player 2	Set 1	Set 2	Set 3	Report
Aug 29	11:10	Noor Azwan Noorlan (Malaysia); Muhammad Ikhwan Ramli (Malaysia)	1–2	(Japan) Daiki Kajiwara (Japan) Hiroshi Murayama	21–17	13–21	16–21	Report
Aug 29	11:50	Mai Jianpeng (China); Qu Zimo (China)	2–0	(Germany) Rick Cornell Hellmann (Germany) Thomas Wandschneider	21–11	21–17		Report
Aug 30	11:50	Rick Cornell Hellmann (Germany); Thomas Wandschneider (Germany)	0–2	(Japan) Daiki Kajiwara (Japan) Hiroshi Murayama	15–21	5–21		Report
Aug 30	12:30	Noor Azwan Noorlan (Malaysia); Muhammad Ikhwan Ramli (Malaysia)	0–2	(China) Mai Jianpeng (China) Qu Zimo	16–21	6–21		Report
Aug 31	12:00	Mai Jianpeng (China); Qu Zimo (China)	2–0	(Japan) Daiki Kajiwara (Japan) Hiroshi Murayama	21–15	21–15		Report
Aug 31	12:40	Noor Azwan Noorlan (Malaysia); Muhammad Ikhwan Ramli (Malaysia)	2–0	(Germany) Rick Cornell Hellmann (Germany) Thomas Wandschneider	21–19	21–17		Report

== Finals ==
The knockout stage will be played from 31 August to 1 September.

Semi-finals
A1	Jeong Jae-gun (KOR); Yu Soo-young (KOR)	21	21
A2	Takumi Matsumoto (JPN); Osamu Nagashima (JPN)	12	12
B2	Daiki Kajiwara (JPN); Hiroshi Murayama (JPN)	15	14
B1	Mai Jianpeng (CHN); Qu Zimo (CHN)	21	21

Gold medal match
A1	Jeong Jae-gun (KOR) (silver); Yu Soo-young (KOR)	10	12	-
B1	Mai Jianpeng (CHN) (gold); Qu Zimo (CHN)	21	21	-
Bronze medal match
A2	Takumi Matsumoto (JPN); Osamu Nagashima (JPN)	21	12	15
B2	Daiki Kajiwara (JPN) (bronze); Hiroshi Murayama (JPN)	19	21	21
