= David Toupé =

French para badminton player

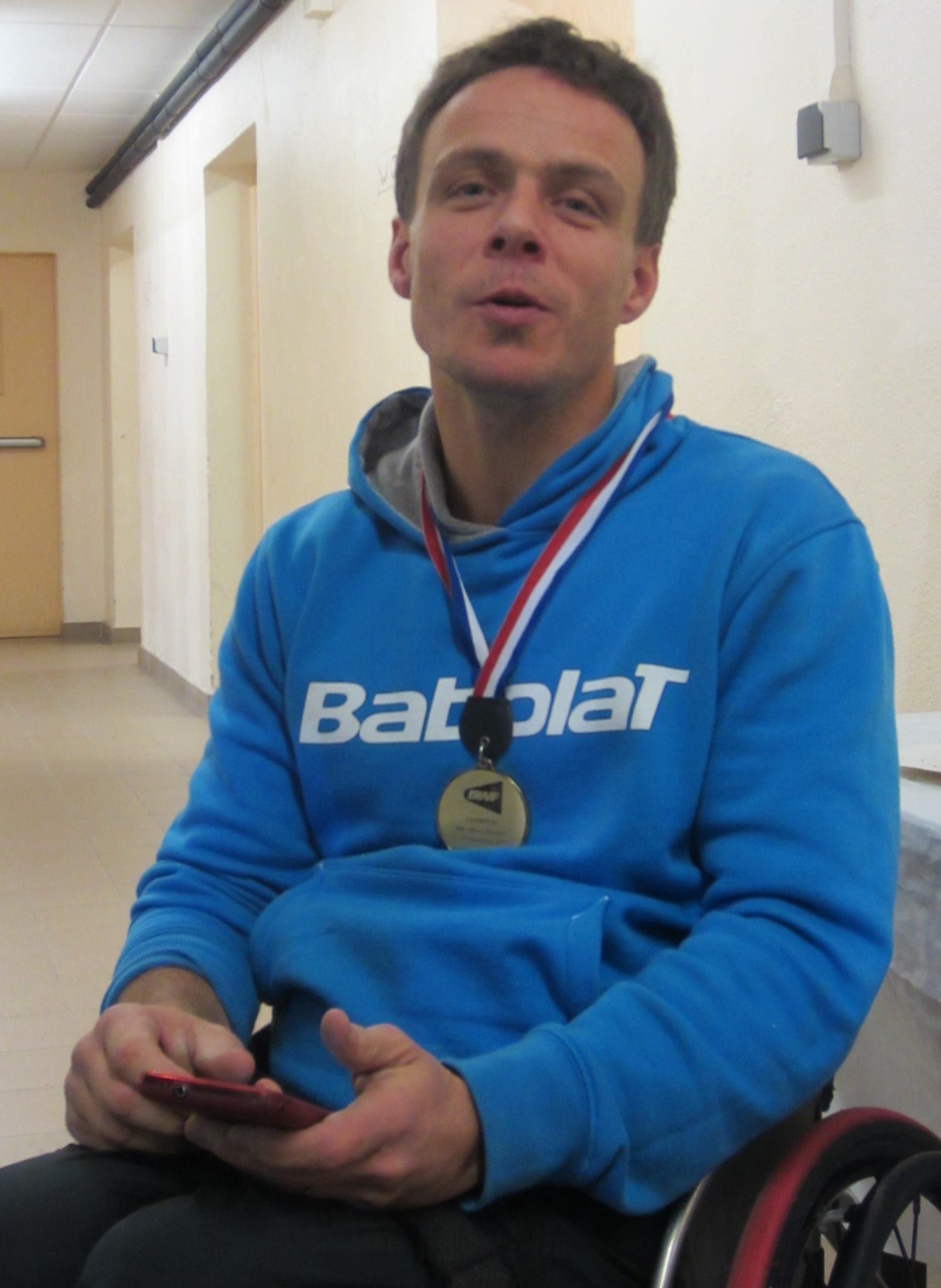

Personal information
- Born: 19 March 1977 (age 49) Rennes, France
- Height: 1.68 m (5 ft 6 in)

Sport
- Country: France
- Sport: Badminton
- Handedness: Right

Men's singles WH1 Men's doubles WH1–WH2
- Highest ranking: 5 (MS 1 January 2019); 2 (MD with Amir Levi 1 January 2019)
- Current ranking: 9 (MS); 8 (MD with Thomas Jakobs) (2 September 2024)
- BWF profile
Medal record
Men's para-badminton
Representing France
World Championships
Gold medal – first place	2013 Dortmund	Men's doubles
Silver medal – second place	2009 Seoul	Men's doubles
Bronze medal – third place	2007 Bangkok	Men's singles
Bronze medal – third place	2009 Seoul	Men's singles
Bronze medal – third place	2022 Tokyo	Men's doubles
Bronze medal – third place	2026 Manama	Men's doubles
European Para Championships
Silver medal – second place	2023 Rotterdam	Men's singles
Silver medal – second place	2023 Rotterdam	Men's doubles
European Championships
Gold medal – first place	2010 Filzbach	Men's singles
Gold medal – first place	2010 Filzbach	Mixed doubles
Gold medal – first place	2014 Murcia	Men's doubles
Silver medal – second place	2008 Dortmund	Men's singles
Silver medal – second place	2008 Dortmund	Men's doubles
Silver medal – second place	2008 Dortmund	Mixed doubles
Silver medal – second place	2012 Dortmund	Men's singles
Silver medal – second place	2012 Dortmund	Men's doubles
Silver medal – second place	2012 Dortmund	Mixed doubles
Silver medal – second place	2014 Murcia	Men's singles
Silver medal – second place	2014 Murcia	Mixed doubles
Silver medal – second place	2016 Beek	Men's singles
Silver medal – second place	2016 Beek	Men's doubles
Silver medal – second place	2016 Beek	Mixed doubles
Silver medal – second place	2018 Rodez	Men's singles
Silver medal – second place	2018 Rodez	Men's doubles
Bronze medal – third place	2006 La Rinconada	Men's doubles
Bronze medal – third place	2006 La Rinconada	Mixed doubles

David Toupé (born 19 March 1977) is a French para-badminton player who competes in international badminton competitions. He is a World and European champion in doubles and four-time European silver medalist in the singles, he is also a nine-time French champion. He competed at the 2020 Summer Paralympics where he did not advance to the quarterfinals in both the men's singles and doubles events.

Toupé was a former able-bodied badminton player before he was involved in a serious skiing accident where he had a spinal cord injury in 2003.

== Achievements ==
=== IBF International ===
Men's doubles
Year	Tournament	Partner	Opponent	Score	Result
1996	Slovenia International	(France) Bertrand Gallet	(France) Manuel Dubrulle (France) Vincent Laigle	10–15, 12–15	(silver) Runner-up

== Para-badminton achievements ==
=== World Championships ===
Men's singles
Year	Venue	Opponent	Score	Result
2009	Olympic Fencing Gymnasium; Seoul, South Korea	(South Korea) Lee Sam-seop	17–21, 12–21	Bronze

Men's doubles

Year	Venue	Partner	Opponent	Score	Result
2007	Gymnasium 1, Bangkok, Thailand	(Israel) Shimon Shalom	(South Korea) Choi Jung-man (South Korea) Lee Sam-seop	11–21, 12–21	Bronze
2009	Olympic Fencing Gymnasium, Seoul, South Korea	(Turkey) Avni Kertmen	(Israel) Shalom Kalvansky (Israel) Shimon Shalom	21–8, 21–10	Silver
2009	Olympic Fencing Gymnasium, Seoul, South Korea	(Turkey) Avni Kertmen	(Japan) Osamu Nagashima (Japan) Tsutomu Shimada	21–16, 21–17	Silver
2009	Olympic Fencing Gymnasium, Seoul, South Korea	(Turkey) Avni Kertmen	(Japan) Hiroki Fujino (Japan) Mitsuyoshi Noine	21–13, 16–21, 21–11	Silver
2009	Olympic Fencing Gymnasium, Seoul, South Korea	(Turkey) Avni Kertmen	(South Korea) Lee Sam-seop (South Korea) Lee Yong-ho	21–19, 9–21, 8–21	Silver
2013	Helmut-Körnig-Halle, Dortmund, Germany	(Germany) Thomas Wandschneider	(Turkey) Avni Kertmen (South Korea) Lee Sam-seop	21–10, 21–16	Gold
2022	Yoyogi National Gymnasium, Tokyo, Japan	(France) Thomas Jakobs	(Malaysia) Noor Azwan Noorlan (Malaysia) Muhammad Ikhwan Ramli	18–21, 21–18, 19–21	Bronze
2026	Isa Sports City, Manama, Bahrain	(France) Thomas Jakobs	(South Korea) Park Hae-seong (South Korea) Yu Soo-young	10–21, 13–21	Bronze

=== European Para Championships ===
Men's singles
Year	Venue	Opponent	Score	Result
2023	Rotterdam Ahoy, Rotterdam, Netherlands	(Germany) Thomas Wandschneider	15–21, 17–21	Silver

Men's doubles
Year	Venue	Partner	Opponent	Score	Result
2023	Rotterdam Ahoy, Rotterdam, Netherlands	(France) Thomas Jakobs	(Germany) Rick Hellmann (Germany) Thomas Wandschneider	19–21, 18–21	Silver

=== European Championships ===
Men's singles
Year	Venue	Opponent	Score	Result
2008	Sporthallen TSC Eintracht Dortmund, Dortmund, Germany	(Germany) Thomas Wandschneider	0–2	Silver
2010	Sportzentrum Kerenzerberg, Filzbach, Switzerland	(Germany) Thomas Wandschneider	21–16, 23–21	Gold
2012	Helmut-Körnig-Halle, Dortmund, Germany	(Germany) Thomas Wandschneider	14–21, 13–21	Silver
2014	High Performance Center, Murcia, Spain	(Germany) Thomas Wandschneider	22–20, 12–21, 15–21	Silver
2016	Sporthal de Haamen, Beek, Netherlands	(Germany) Thomas Wandschneider	28–26, 17–21, 13–21	Silver
2018	Amphitheatre Gymnasium, Rodez, France	(Germany) Thomas Wandschneider	14–21, 13–21	Silver

Men's doubles
Year	Venue	Partner	Opponent	Score	Result
2006	Fernando Marin Sports Centre; La Rinconada, Spain	(Israel) Shimon Shalom	(Turkey) Avni Kertmen (Germany) Thomas Wandschneider	18–21, 12–21	Bronze
2008	Sporthallen TSC Eintracht Dortmund; Dortmund, Germany	(Israel) Shimon Shalom	(Turkey) Avni Kertmen (Germany) Thomas Wandschneider	0–2	Silver
2010	Sportzentrum Kerenzerberg; Filzbach, Switzerland	(France) Sébastien Martin	(Turkey) Avni Kertmen (Germany) Thomas Wandschneider	15–21, 10–21	Silver
2012	Helmut-Körnig-Halle; Dortmund, Germany	(France) Pascal Barrillon	(Turkey) Avni Kertmen (Germany) Thomas Wandschneider	12–21, 16–21	Silver
2014	High Performance Center; Murcia, Spain	(Germany) Thomas Wandschneider	(Turkey) Avni Kertmen (England) Martin Rooke	21–11, 21–13	Gold
2016	Sporthal de Haamen; Beek, Netherlands	(England) Martin Rooke	(England) Connor Dua-Harper (Germany) Thomas Wandschneider	17–21, 21–12, 16–21	Silver
2018	Amphitheatre Gymnasium; Rodez, France	(Israel) Amir Levi	(England) Martin Rooke (Germany) Thomas Wandschneider	19–21, 16–21	Gold

Mixed doubles
Year	Venue	Partner	Opponent	Score	Result
2006	Fernando Marin Sports Centre; La Rinconada, Spain	(Germany) Irmgard Wandt	(Germany) Manfred Steinhart (Germany) Elke Rongen	17–21, 24–26	Bronze
2008	Sporthallen TSC Eintracht Dortmund; Dortmund, Germany	(Switzerland) Sonja Häsler			Silver
2010	Sportzentrum Kerenzerberg; Filzbach, Switzerland	(Switzerland) Sonja Häsler	(Israel) Shimon Shalom (Israel) Nina Gorodetzky	21–12, 21–15	Gold
2012	Helmut-Körnig-Halle; Dortmund, Germany	(Switzerland) Sonja Häsler	(Germany) Thomas Wandschneider (Switzerland) Karin Suter-Erath	11–21, 12–21	Silver
2014	High Performance Center; Murcia, Spain	(Switzerland) Sonja Häsler	(England) Martin Rooke (Switzerland) Karin Suter-Erath	15–21, 8–21	Silver
2016	Sporthal de Haamen; Beek, Netherlands	(Turkey) Narin Uluç	(England) Martin Rooke (Switzerland) Karin Suter-Erath	18–21, 14–21	Silver

=== BWF Para Badminton World Circuit (2 runners-up) ===
The BWF Para Badminton World Circuit – Grade 2, Level 1, 2 and 3 tournaments has been sanctioned by the Badminton World Federation from 2022.

Men's singles
Year	Tournament	Level	Opponent	Score	Result
2024	Brazil Para-Badminton International	Level 2	(Malaysia) Muhammad Ikhwan Ramli	17–21, 8–21	(silver) Runner-up

Men's doubles
Year	Tournament	Level	Partner	Opponent	Score	Result
2022	Brazil Para-Badminton International	Level 2	(France) Thomas Jakobs	(Japan) Daiki Kajiwara (Japan) Keita Nishimura	14–21, 19–21	(silver) Runner-up

=== International tournaments (from 2011–2021) (14 titles, 13 runners-up) ===
Men's singles
Year	Tournament	Opponent	Score	Result
2011	Spanish Para-Badminton International	(Germany) Thomas Wandschneider	18–21, 10–21	(silver) Runner-up
2012	French Para-Badminton International	(Germany) Thomas Wandschneider	21–19, 21–18	(gold) Winner
2015	Spanish Para-Badminton International	(Germany) Thomas Wandschneider	9–21, 13–21	(silver) Runner-up
2015	Irish Para-Badminton International	(England) Connor Dua-Harper	22–20, 21–12	(gold) Winner
2016	Turkish Para-Badminton International	(Germany) Thomas Wandschneider	19–21, 17–21	(silver) Runner-up
2017	Irish Para-Badminton International	(South Korea) Lee Sam-seop	2–11 retired	(silver) Runner-up
2018	Dubai Para-Badminton International	(Malaysia) Muhammad Ikhwan Ramli	19–21, 21–13, 21–13	(gold) Winner
2018	Turkish Para-Badminton International	(Japan) Osamu Nagashima	14–21, 15–21	(silver) Runner-up
2019	Uganda Para-Badminton International	(Germany) Thomas Wandschneider	11–21, 26–24, 16–21	(silver) Runner-up
2021	Dubai Para-Badminton International	(Malaysia) Muhammad Ikhwan Ramli	21–23, 13–21	(silver) Runner-up

Men's doubles

Year	Tournament	Partner	Opponent	Score	Result
2011	Spanish Para-Badminton International	(France) Pascal Barrillon	(Turkey) Avni Kertmen (Germany) Thomas Wandschneider	12–21, 9–21	(silver) Runner-up
2013	Spanish Para-Badminton International	(Germany) Thomas Wandschneider	(Spain) Javier Fernández (Spain) Roberto Galdos	21–6, 21–13	(gold) Winner
2013	Spanish Para-Badminton International	(Germany) Thomas Wandschneider	(France) Sébastien Martin (Japan) Seiji Yamami	21–17, 20–22, 21–13	(gold) Winner
2013	Spanish Para-Badminton International	(Germany) Thomas Wandschneider	(South Korea) Choi Jung-man (South Korea) Lee Sam-seop	11–21, 14–21	(gold) Winner
2015	Spanish Para-Badminton International	(Germany) Thomas Wandschneider	(England) Connor Dua-Harper (England) Martin Rooke	22–20, 21–12	(gold) Winner
2015	China Para-Badminton International	(Hong Kong) Chan Ho Yuen	(South Korea) Kim Kyung-hoon (South Korea) Lee Sam-seop	10–21, 14–21	(silver) Runner-up
2015	Irish Para-Badminton International	(Hong Kong) Chan Ho Yuen	(England) Connor Dua-Harper (England) David Follett	21–6, 21–12	(gold) Winner
2016	Turkish Para-Badminton International	(Germany) Thomas Wandschneider	(Spain) Javier Fernández (Spain) Roberto Galdos	21–13, 21–9	(gold) Winner
2016	Irish Para-Badminton International	(Germany) Thomas Wandschneider	(South Korea) Kim Jung-jun (South Korea) Lee Sam-seop	14–21, 9–21	(silver) Runner-up
2018	Dubai Para-Badminton International	(Hong Kong) Chan Ho Yuen	(Malaysia) Muhammad Ikhwan Ramli (Malaysia) Madzlan Saibon	21–11, 21–23, 23–21	(gold) Winner
2018	Turkish Para-Badminton International	(Malaysia) Madzlan Saibon	(Thailand) Chatchai Kornpeekanok (Thailand) Aphichat Sumpradit	21–16, 21–16	(gold) Winner
2018	Japan Para-Badminton International	(South Korea) Kim Sung-hun	(South Korea) Jeong Jae-gun (South Korea) Lee Sam-seop	21–17, 20–22, 21–13	(gold) Winner
2018	Australia Para-Badminton International	(Israel) Amir Levi	(South Korea) Choi Jung-man (South Korea) Kim Jung-jun	8–21, 17–21	(silver) Runner-up
2019	Uganda Para-Badminton International	(France) Thomas Jakobs	(Brazil) Marcelo Alves Conceição (Brazil) Julio César Godoy	21–8, 21–12	(gold) Winner
2021	Dubai Para-Badminton International	(France) Thomas Jakobs	(India) Prem Kumar Ale (India) Abu Hubaida	21–19, 23–21	(gold) Winner

Mixed doubles

Year	Tournament	Partner	Opponent	Score	Result
2012	French Para-Badminton International	(Switzerland) Sonja Häsler	(France) Pascal Barrillon (Spain) Sofía Balsalobre	21–5, 21–4	(gold) Winner
2012	French Para-Badminton International	(Switzerland) Sonja Häsler	(Germany) Marc Jung (Germany) Elke Rongen	21–5, 21–6	(gold) Winner
2012	French Para-Badminton International	(Switzerland) Sonja Häsler	(Germany) Young-chin Mi (Germany) Valeska Knoblauch	21–11, 21–14	(gold) Winner
2012	Australia Para-Badminton International	(Switzerland) Sonja Häsler	(Thailand) Jakarin Homhual (Thailand) Sujirat Pookkham	21–15, 16–21, 21–18	(gold) Winner
2015	Irish Para-Badminton International	(Switzerland) Sonja Häsler	(Hong Kong) Chan Ho Yuen (Switzerland) Karin Suter-Erath	14–21, 21–16, 14–21	(silver) Runner-up
2016	Turkish Para-Badminton International	(Switzerland) Sonja Häsler	(England) Martin Rooke (Switzerland) Karin Suter-Erath	20–22, 11–21	(silver) Runner-up
