= Thomas Jakobs =

French para badminton player

Personal information
- Born: 7 August 1991 (age 35) Courcouronnes, France
- Height: 1.68 m (5 ft 6 in)

Sport
- Country: France
- Sport: Badminton
- Handedness: Right

Men's singles WH2 Men's doubles WH1–WH2
- Highest ranking: 5 (MS 13 August 2024); 4 (MD with David Toupé 20 February 2024)
- Current ranking: 6 (MS); 8 (MD with David Toupé) (3 September 2024)
Medal record
Men's para-badminton
Representing France
World Championships
Bronze medal – third place	2022 Tokyo	Men's doubles
Bronze medal – third place	2026 Manama	Men's doubles
European Para Championships
Silver medal – second place	2023 Rotterdam	Men's doubles
Bronze medal – third place	2023 Rotterdam	Men's singles

Thomas Jakobs (born 7 August 1991) is a French para badminton player who competes in international badminton competitions. He is a World bronze medalist and European silver medalist in the men's doubles with doubles partner David Toupé. Jakobs competed at the 2020 Summer Paralympics but did not medal.

Jakobs was a former tennis player and worked as a thermal engineer before his accident. He took up badminton in 2017.

== Achievements ==
=== World Championships ===
Men's doubles WH1–WH2
Year	Venue	Partner	Opponent	Score	Result
2022	Yoyogi National Gymnasium; Tokyo, Japan	(France) David Toupé	(Malaysia) Noor Azwan Noorlan (Malaysia) Muhammad Ikhwan Ramli	18–21, 21–18, 19–21	Bronze
2026	Isa Sports City, Manama, Bahrain	(France) David Toupé	(South Korea) Park Hae-seong (South Korea) Yu Soo-young	10–21, 13–21	Bronze

=== European Para Championships ===
Men's singles WH2
Year	Venue	Opponent	Score	Result
2023	Rotterdam Ahoy, Rotterdam, Netherlands	(Germany) Rick Hellmann	14–21, 17–21	Bronze

Men's doubles WH1–WH2
Year	Venue	Partner	Opponent	Score	Result
2023	Rotterdam Ahoy; Rotterdam, Netherlands	(France) David Toupé	(Germany) Rick Hellmann (Germany) Thomas Wandschneider	19–21, 18–21	Silver

=== BWF Para Badminton World Circuit (3 runners-up) ===
The BWF Para Badminton World Circuit – Grade 2, Level 1, 2 and 3 tournaments has been sanctioned by the Badminton World Federation from 2022.

Men's singles WH2
Year	Tournament	Level	Opponent	Score	Result
2024	Spanish Para-Badminton International II	Level 2	(Japan) Daiki Kajiwara	6–21, 17–21	(silver) Runner-up
2024	Bahrain Para-Badminton International	Level 2	(Hong Kong) Chan Ho Yuen	21–16, 15–21, 17–21	(silver) Runner-up

Men's doubles WH1–WH2
Year	Tournament	Level	Partner	Opponent	Score	Result
2022	Brazil Para-Badminton International	Level 2	(France) David Toupé	(Japan) Daiki Kajiwara (Japan) Keita Nishimura	14–21, 19–21	(silver) Runner-up

=== International tournaments (2011–2021) (2 titles) ===
Men's doubles WH1–WH2
Year	Tournament	Partner	Opponent	Score	Result
2019	Uganda Para-Badminton International	(France) David Toupé	(Brazil) Marcelo Alves Conceição (Brazil) Julio César Godoy	21–8, 21–12	(gold) Winner
2021	Dubai Para-Badminton International	(France) David Toupé	(India) Prem Kumar Ale (India) Abu Hubaida	21–19, 23–21	(gold) Winner
