= Thomas Wandschneider =

German para badminton player

Personal information
- Born: 7 November 1963 (age 63) Buxtehude, Germany

Sport
- Country: Germany
- Sport: Badminton
- Handedness: Right
- Coached by: Jens Janisch

Men’s singles WH1 Men's doubles WH1–WH2
- Highest ranking: 1 (MS 1 January 2019); 1 (MD with Martin Rooke 1 January 2019)
- Current ranking: 3 (MS); 2 (MD with Rick Hellmann) (8 November 2022)
- BWF profile
Medal record
Men's para-badminton
Representing Germany
Paralympic Games
Bronze medal – third place	2024 Paris	Men's singles
World Championships
Gold medal – first place	2005 Hsinchu	Men's singles
Gold medal – first place	2005 Hsinchu	Men's doubles
Gold medal – first place	2011 Guatemala City	Men's doubles
Gold medal – first place	2013 Dortmund	Men's doubles
Gold medal – first place	2022 Tokyo	Men's doubles
Silver medal – second place	2007 Bangkok	Men's doubles
Silver medal – second place	2011 Guatemala City	Men's singles
Silver medal – second place	2015 Stoke Mandeville	Men's singles
Bronze medal – third place	2003 Cardiff	Mixed doubles
Bronze medal – third place	2013 Dortmund	Men's singles
Bronze medal – third place	2013 Dortmund	Mixed doubles
Bronze medal – third place	2017 Ulsan	Men's singles
European Para Championships
Gold medal – first place	2023 Rotterdam	Men's singles
Gold medal – first place	2023 Rotterdam	Men's doubles
European Championships
Gold medal – first place	2006 La Rinconada	Men's singles
Gold medal – first place	2006 La Rinconada	Men's doubles
Gold medal – first place	2008 Dortmund	Men's doubles
Gold medal – first place	2010 Filzbach	Men's singles
Gold medal – first place	2010 Filzbach	Men's doubles
Gold medal – first place	2012 Dortmund	Men's singles
Gold medal – first place	2012 Dortmund	Men's doubles
Gold medal – first place	2014 Murcia	Men's singles
Gold medal – first place	2014 Murcia	Men's doubles
Gold medal – first place	2016 Beek	Men's singles
Gold medal – first place	2016 Beek	Men's doubles
Gold medal – first place	2018 Rodez	Men's singles
Gold medal – first place	2018 Rodez	Men's doubles
Silver medal – second place	2010 Filzbach	Men's singles
Bronze medal – third place	2004 Tilburg	Men's singles
Bronze medal – third place	2004 Tilburg	Men's doubles
Bronze medal – third place	2010 Filzbach	Mixed doubles

Thomas Wandschneider (born 7 November 1963 in Buxtehude) is a German para-badminton player. He is a four time Para badminton world champion. He considered retiring in 2018, but changed his mind due to Badminton being at the 2020 Summer Paralympics. Wandschneider is also a 14-time gold medalist at the European Para-Badminton Championships.

In his second appearance at the Paralympics in 2024, he won a bronze medal in the men's singles WH1 event, gifting Germany's first para-badminton medal at the Paralympics. Wandschneider also became the oldest Paralympic medalist in para-badminton at 60 years old.

== Biography ==
Wandschneider was diagnosed with paraplegia after a car accident in May 2000. Wandschneider was later introduced to para-badminton through an acquaintance from the hospital and made his debut in the sport at the 2001 IBAD Para-Badminton World Championships in Córdoba, Spain.

== Achievements ==
=== Paralympic Games ===
Men's singles WH1

Year	Venue	Opponent	Score	Result
2024	Porte de La Chapelle Arena, Paris, France	(South Korea) Jeong Jae-gun	26–24, 21–11	Bronze

=== World Championships ===
Men's singles WH1
Year	Venue	Opponent	Score	Result
2005	Hsinchu Municipal Gymnasium, Hsinchu, Taiwan	(South Korea) Lee Sam-seop	2–0	Gold
2011	Coliseo Deportivo; Guatemala City, Guatemala	(South Korea) Lee Sam-seop	14–21, 11–21	Silver
2013	Helmut-Körnig-Halle, Dortmund, Germany	(South Korea) Lee Sam-seop	20–22, 21–19, 21–21	Bronze
2015	Stoke Mandeville Stadium, Stoke Mandeville, England	(South Korea) Lee Sam-seop	9–21, 12–21	Silver
2017	Dongchun Gymnasium, Ulsan, South Korea	(China) Qu Zimo	18–21, 9–21	Bronze

Men's doubles WH1–WH2
Year	Venue	Partner	Opponent	Score	Result
2005	Hsinchu Municipal Gymnasium; Hsinchu, Taiwan	(Germany) Avni Kertmen	(South Korea) Choi Jung-man (South Korea) Lee Sam-seop	2–0	Gold
2007	Gymnasium 1 Bangkok, Thailand	(Turkey) Avni Kertmen	(South Korea) Choi Jung-man (South Korea) Lee Sam-seop	17–21, 16–21	Silver
2011	Coliseo Deportivo; Guatemala City, Guatemala	(Turkey) Avni Kertmen	(Japan) Osamu Nagashima (Japan) Seiji Yamami	21–10, 21–15	Gold
2013	Helmut-Körnig-Halle; Dortmund, Germany	(France) David Toupé	(Turkey) Avni Kertmen (South Korea) Lee Sam-seop	21–10, 21–16	Gold
2022	Yoyogi National Gymnasium; Tokyo, Japan	(Germany) Rick Hellmann	(Malaysia) Noor Azwan Noorlan (Malaysia) Muhammad Ikhwan Ramli	21–11, 21–15	Gold

Mixed doubles WH1–WH2
Year	Venue	Partner	Opponent	Score	Result
2003	Welsh Institute of Sport; Cardiff, Wales	(Germany) Irmgard Wandt	(Netherlands) Ton Hollaar (Netherlands) Carol de Meijer	5–11, 12–13	Bronze
2013	Helmut-Körnig-Halle; Dortmund, Germany	(Switzerland) Karin Suter-Erath	(South Korea) Lee Sam-seop (South Korea) Son Ok-cha	19–21, 21–23	Bronze

=== European Para Championships ===
Men's singles WH1
Year	Venue	Opponent	Score	Result
2023	Rotterdam Ahoy, Rotterdam, Netherlands	(France) David Toupé	21–15, 21–17	Gold

Men's doubles WH1–WH2
Year	Venue	Partner	Opponent	Score	Result
2023	Rotterdam Ahoy; Rotterdam, Netherlands	(Germany) Rick Hellmann	(France) Thomas Jakobs (France) David Toupé	21–19, 21–18	Gold

=== European Championships ===
Men's singles WH1
Year	Venue	Opponent	Score	Result
2004	Sporthal Dongewijk, Tilburg, Netherlands	(Netherlands) Quincy Michielsen	10–15, 10–15	Bronze
2006	Fernando Marin Sports Centre, La Rinconada, Spain	(Switzerland) Walter Rauber	21–7, 21–5	Gold
2008	Sporthallen TSC Eintracht Dortmund, Dortmund, Germany	(France) David Toupé	2–0	Gold
2010	Sportzentrum Kerenzerberg, Filzbach, Switzerland	(France) David Toupé	16–21, 21–23	Silver
2012	Helmut-Körnig-Halle, Dortmund, Germany	(France) David Toupé	21–14, 21–13	Gold
2014	High Performance Center, Murcia, Spain	(France) David Toupé	20–22, 21–12, 21–15	Gold
2016	Sporthal de Haamen, Beek, Netherlands	(France) David Toupé	26–28, 21–17, 21–13	Gold
2018	Amphitheatre Gymnasium, Rodez, France	(France) David Toupé	21–14, 21–13	Gold

Men's doubles WH1–WH2
Year	Venue	Partner	Opponent	Score	Result
2004	Sporthal Dongewijk; Tilburg, Netherlands	(Germany) Klaus Gröning	(Israel) Amir Levi (Israel) Moshe Zehavi	1–15, 4–15	Bronze
2006	Fernando Marin Sports Centre; La Rinconada, Spain	(Germany) Avni Kertmen	(Netherlands) Ferdinand Hoeke (Switzerland) Walter Rauber	21–13, 21–9	Gold
2008	Sporthallen TSC Eintracht Dortmund; Dortmund, Germany	(Turkey) Avni Kertmen	(Israel) Shimon Shalom (France) David Toupé	2–0	Gold
2010	Sportzentrum Kerenzerberg; Filzbach, Switzerland	(Turkey) Avni Kertmen	(France) Sébastien Martin (France) David Toupé	22–20, 20–22, 21–7	Gold
2012	Helmut-Körnig-Halle; Dortmund, Germany	(Turkey) Avni Kertmen	(France) Pascal Barrillon (France) David Toupé	21–12, 21–16	Gold
2014	High Performance Center; Murcia, Spain	(France) David Toupé	(Turkey) Avni Kertmen (England) Martin Rooke	21–11, 21–13	Gold
2016	Sporthal de Haamen; Beek, Netherlands	(England) Connor Dua-Harper	(England) Martin Rooke (France) David Toupé	21–17, 12–21, 21–16	Gold
2018	Amphitheatre Gymnasium; Rodez, France	(England) Martin Rooke	(Israel) Amir Levi (France) David Toupé	21–19, 21–16	Gold

Mixed doubles WH1–WH2
Year	Venue	Partner	Opponent	Score	Result
2010	Sportzentrum Kerenzerberg; Filzbach, Switzerland	(Germany) Ulrike Kriebel	(France) David Toupé (Switzerland) Sonja Häsler	17–21, 15–21	Bronze

=== BWF Para Badminton World Circuit (1 title, 6 runners-up) ===
The BWF Para Badminton World Circuit – Grade 2, Level 1, 2 and 3 tournaments has been sanctioned by the Badminton World Federation from 2022.

Men's singles WH1
Year	Tournament	Level	Opponent	Score	Result
2022	Spanish Para-Badminton International II	Level 2	(Malaysia) Muhammad Ikhwan Ramli	20–22, 24–22, 17–21	(silver) Runner-up
2022	Spanish Para-Badminton International	Level 1	(Malaysia) Muhammad Ikhwan Ramli	12–21, 16–21	(silver) Runner-up
2024	Spanish Para-Badminton International II	Level 2	(South Korea) Jeong Jae-gun	17–21, 25–23, 20–22	(silver) Runner-up

Men's doubles WH1–WH2
Year	Tournament	Level	Partner	Opponent	Score	Result
2022	Spanish Para-Badminton International II	Level 2	(Germany) Rick Hellmann	(Malaysia) Noor Azwan Noorlan (Malaysia) Muhammad Ikhwan Ramli	21–14, 21–14	(gold) Winner
2022	Bahrain Para-Badminton International	Level 2	(Germany) Rick Hellmann	(South Korea) Choi Jung-man (South Korea) Kim Jung-jun	21–12, 10–21, 11–21	(silver) Runner-up
2022	4 Nations Para-Badminton International	Level 1	(Germany) Rick Hellmann	(Malaysia) Noor Azwan Noorlan (Malaysia) Muhammad Ikhwan Ramli	22–20, 17–21, 11–21	(silver) Runner-up
2024	Spanish Para-Badminton International I	Level 1	(Germany) Rick Hellmann	(South Korea) Jeong Jae-gun (South Korea) Yu Soo-young	14–21, 12–21	(silver) Runner-up

=== International tournaments (2011–2021) (13 titles, 9 runners-up) ===
Men's singles WH1
Year	Tournament	Opponent	Score	Result
2011	Spanish Para-Badminton International	(France) David Toupé	21–18, 21–10	(gold) Winner
2012	French Para-Badminton International	(France) David Toupé	19–21, 18–21	(silver) Runner-up
2015	Spanish Para-Badminton International	(France) David Toupé	21–9, 21–13	(gold) Winner
2016	Turkish Para-Badminton International	(France) David Toupé	21–19, 21–17	(gold) Winner
2016	Irish Para-Badminton International	(South Korea) Lee Sam-seop	15–21, 15–21	(silver) Runner-up
2017	Spanish Para-Badminton International	(France) David Toupé	21–18, 21–14	(gold) Winner
2018	Thailand Para-Badminton International	(South Korea) Lee Dong-seop	9–21, 7–21	(silver) Runner-up
2018	Denmark Para-Badminton International	(Brazil) Marcelo Alves Conceição	21–10, 21–8	(gold) Winner
2019	Uganda Para-Badminton International	(France) David Toupé	21–11, 24–26, 21–16	(gold) Winner
2019	Canada Para-Badminton International	(South Korea) Lee Dong-seop	13–21, 17–21	(gold) Winner
2021	Uganda Para-Badminton International	(Russia) Konstantin Afinogenov	21–4, 21–13	(gold) Winner

Men's doubles WH1–WH2

Year	Tournament	Partner	Opponent	Score	Result
2011	Spanish Para-Badminton International	(Turkey) Avni Kertmen	(France) Pascal Barrillon (France) David Toupé	21–12, 21–9	(gold) Winner
2012	Spanish Para-Badminton International	(Turkey) Avni Kertmen	(South Korea) Choi Jung-man (South Korea) Lee Sam-seop	13–21, 17–21	(silver) Runner-up
2013 (Note: This tournament uses a round robin system.)	Spanish Para-Badminton International	(France) David Toupé	(Spain) Javier Fernández (Spain) Roberto Galdos	21–6, 21–13	(silver) Runner-up
2013	Spanish Para-Badminton International	(France) David Toupé	(France) Sébastien Martin (Japan) Seiji Yamami	21–6, 21–5	(silver) Runner-up
2013	Spanish Para-Badminton International	(France) David Toupé	(South Korea) Choi Jung-man (South Korea) Lee Sam-seop	11–21, 14–21	(silver) Runner-up
2015	Spanish Para-Badminton International	(France) David Toupé	(England) Connor Dua-Harper (England) Martin Rooke	22–20, 21–12	(gold) Winner
2016	Turkish Para-Badminton International	(France) David Toupé	(Spain) Javier Fernández (Spain) Roberto Galdos	21–13, 21–19	(gold) Winner
2016	Irish Para-Badminton International	(France) David Toupé	(South Korea) Kim Jung-jun (South Korea) Lee Sam-seop	14–21, 9–21	(silver) Runner-up
2017	Irish Para-Badminton International	(Hong Kong) Chan Ho Yuen	(South Korea) Kim Kyung-hoon (South Korea) Lee Sam-seop	19–21, 17–21	(silver) Runner-up
2018	Irish Para-Badminton International	(England) Martin Rooke	(South Korea) Kim Kyung-hoon (South Korea) Lee Sam-seop	17–21, 13–21	(silver) Runner-up
2019	Denmark Para-Badminton International	(Germany) Young-chin Mi	(Japan) Daiki Kajiwara (Japan) Hiroshi Murayama	12–21, 9–21	(silver) Runner-up
2021	Uganda Para-Badminton International	(Germany) Rick Hellmann	(India) Prem Kumar Ale (India) Abu Hubaida	21–13, 21–13	(gold) Winner
