= Badminton at the 2023 European Para Championships – Men's doubles WH1–WH2 =

International sporting competition

Badminton's men's doubles WH1–WH2 at the 2023 European Para Championships
- Venue: Rotterdam Ahoy, Rotterdam
- Dates: 15 – 20 August
- Competitors: 26 from 11 nations

Medalists
gold medal	Rick Hellmann; Thomas Wandschneider	Germany
silver medal	Thomas Jakobs; David Toupé	France
bronze medal	Konstantin Afinogenov; Amir Levi	Israel
bronze medal	Dražen Mikšić; Lars Porrenga	Mixed-NOCs

The men's doubles WH1–WH2 badminton tournament at the 2023 European Para Championships was played from 15 to 20 August 2023 in Rotterdam Ahoy, Rotterdam. A total of 13 pairs competed at the tournament, four of whom was seeded.

== Competition schedule ==
Play took place between 15 and 20 August.

GS	Group stage	¼	Quarterfinals	½	Semifinals	F	Final

Events	Tue 15	Wed 16	Thu 17	Fri 18	Sat 19	Sun 20
Men's doubles WH1–WH2	GS	GS	GS	¼	½	F

== Seeds ==
The following players were seeded:

1. Rick Hellmann / Thomas Wandschneider (GER) (champion; gold medalist)
2. Thomas Jakobs / David Toupé (FRA) (final; silver medalist)
3. Ignacio Fernández / Francisco Motero (ESP) (quarter-finals)
4. Konstantin Afinogenov / Amir Levi (ISR) (semi-finals; bronze medalists)

== Group stage ==
=== Group A ===
Pos	Team	Pld	W	L	GF	GA	GD	PF	PA	PD	Qualification
1	Rick Hellmann (GER) Thomas Wandschneider (GER) [1]	2	2	0	4	0	+4	84	10	+74	Qualification to elimination stage
2	Dražen Mikšić (CRO) Lars Porrenga (SUI) [SUB]	2	1	1	2	3	−1	66	93	−27	Qualification to elimination stage
3	Vincenco Contemi (ITA) Piero Rosario Suma (ITA)	2	0	2	1	4	−3	56	103	−47	

Source: Group A – standings

Date		Score		Game 1	Game 2	Game 3
15 August	Vincenco Contemi (Italy); Piero Rosario Suma (Italy)	1–2	(Croatia) Dražen Mikšić (Switzerland) Lars Porrenga	21–19	15–21	15–21
16 August	Rick Hellmann (Germany); Thomas Wandschneider (Germany)	2–0	(Italy) Vincenco Contemi (Italy) Piero Rosario Suma	21–1	21–4	
17 August	Rick Hellmann (Germany); Thomas Wandschneider (Germany)	2–0	(Croatia) Dražen Mikšić (Switzerland) Lars Porrenga	21–2	21–3	

=== Group B ===
Pos	Team	Pld	W	L	GF	GA	GD	PF	PA	PD	Qualification
1	Thomas Jakobs (FRA) David Toupé (FRA) [2]	2	2	0	4	0	+4	84	29	+55	Qualification to elimination stage
2	Gregor Anderson (GBR) Brent Van Der Kelen (BEL)	2	1	1	2	2	0	65	60	+5	Qualification to elimination stage
3	Michael Smith (IRL) Chris Stewart (IRL)	2	0	2	0	4	−4	24	84	−60	

Source: Group B – standings

Date		Score		Game 1	Game 2	Game 3
15 August	Gregor Anderson (United Kingdom); Brent Van Der Kelen (Belgium)	2–0	(Republic of Ireland) Michael Smith (Republic of Ireland) Chris Stewart	21–8	21–10	
16 August	Thomas Jakobs (France); David Toupé (France)	2–0	(United Kingdom) Gregor Anderson (Belgium) Brent Van Der Kelen	21–7	21–16	
17 August	Thomas Jakobs (France); David Toupé (France)	2–0	(Republic of Ireland) Michael Smith (Republic of Ireland) Chris Stewart	21–2	21–4	

=== Group C ===
Pos	Team	Pld	W	L	GF	GA	GD	PF	PA	PD	Qualification
1	Marc Elmer (SUI) Yuri Ferrigno (ITA)	2	2	0	4	0	+4	84	52	+32	Qualification to elimination stage
2	Ignacio Fernández (ESP) Francisco Motero (ESP) [3/4]	2	1	1	2	2	0	79	57	+22	Qualification to elimination stage
3	Lukáš Kyncl (CZE) Kamil Šnajdar (CZE)	2	0	2	0	4	−4	30	84	−54	

Source: Group C – standings

Date		Score		Game 1	Game 2	Game 3
15 August	Marc Elmer (Switzerland); Yuri Ferrigno (Italy)	2–0	(Czech Republic) Lukáš Kyncl (Czech Republic) Kamil Šnajdar	21–8	21–7	
16 August	Ignacio Fernández (Spain); Francisco Motero (Spain)	0–2	(Switzerland) Marc Elmer (Italy) Yuri Ferrigno	19–21	18–21	
17 August	Ignacio Fernández (Spain); Francisco Motero (Spain)	2–0	(Czech Republic) Lukáš Kyncl (Czech Republic) Kamil Šnajdar	21–6	21–9	

=== Group D ===
Pos	Team	Pld	W	L	GF	GA	GD	PF	PA	PD	Qualification
1	Konstantin Afinogenov (ISR) Amir Levi (ISR) [3/4]	3	3	0	6	0	+6	126	42	+84	Qualification to elimination stage
2	Stephen Durand (FRA) Zbyněk Sýkora (CZE)	3	2	1	4	3	+1	110	114	−4	Qualification to elimination stage
3	Owen Kilburn (GBR) Gobi Ranganathan (GBR)	3	1	2	3	4	−1	110	115	−5	
4	Miloš Bauer (CZE) Jan Matoušek (CZE)	3	0	3	0	6	−6	51	126	−75	

Source: Group A – standings

Date		Score		Game 1	Game 2	Game 3
15 August	Konstantin Afinogenov (Israel); Amir Levi (Israel)	2–0	(United Kingdom) Owen Kilburn (United Kingdom) Gobi Ranganathan	21–6	21–12	
15 August	Miloš Bauer (Czech Republic); Jan Matoušek (Czech Republic)	0–2	(France) Stephen Durand (Czech Republic) Zbyněk Sýkora	11–21	11–21	
16 August	Konstantin Afinogenov (Israel); Amir Levi (Israel)	2–0	(Czech Republic) Miloš Bauer (Czech Republic) Jan Matoušek	21–3	21–6	
16 August	Stephen Durand (France); Zbyněk Sýkora (Czech Republic)	2–1	(United Kingdom) Owen Kilburn (United Kingdom) Gobi Ranganathan	21–11	11–21	21–18
17 August	Miloš Bauer (Czech Republic); Jan Matoušek (Czech Republic)	0–2	(United Kingdom) Owen Kilburn (United Kingdom) Gobi Ranganathan	13–21	7–21	
17 August	Konstantin Afinogenov (Israel); Amir Levi (Israel)	2–0	(France) Stephen Durand (Czech Republic) Zbyněk Sýkora	21–5	21–10	

== Elimination stage ==
Quarter-finals
1	Rick Hellmann (GER); Thomas Wandschneider (GER)	21	21
3/4	Ignacio Fernández (ESP); Francisco Motero (ESP)	6	9
3/4	Konstantin Afinogenov (ISR); Amir Levi (ISR)	21	21
Gregor Anderson (GBR); Brent Van Der Kelen (BEL)	6	5
Dražen Mikšić (CRO); Lars Porrenga (SUI)	21	21
Marc Elmer (SUI); Yuri Ferrigno (ITA)	11	12
Stephen Durand (FRA); Zbyněk Sýkora (CZE)	8	4
2	Thomas Jakobs (FRA); David Toupé (FRA)	21	21

Semi-finals
1	Rick Hellmann (GER); Thomas Wandschneider (GER)	21	21
3/4	Konstantin Afinogenov (ISR); Amir Levi (ISR)	19	10
Dražen Mikšić (CRO); Lars Porrenga (SUI)	21	18	6
2	Thomas Jakobs (FRA); David Toupé (FRA)	17	21	21

Final
1	Rick Hellmann (GER); Thomas Wandschneider (GER)	21	21
2	Thomas Jakobs (FRA); David Toupé (FRA)	19	18
