= Nüenchamm =

Mountain in Switzerland

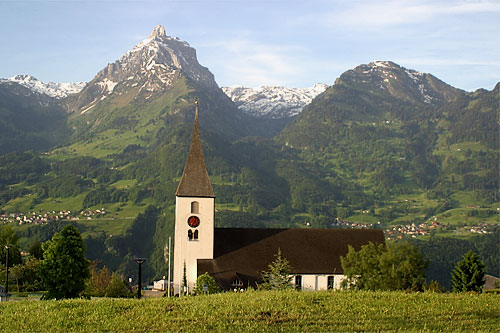
- Mürtschenstock (left) and Nüenchamm (right)

Highest point
- Elevation: 1,904 m (6,247 ft)
- Prominence: 200 m (660 ft)
- Coordinates: 47°5′29″N 9°7′14″E

Geography
- Location within Switzerland
- Location: Glarus, Switzerland
- Parent range: Glarus Alps

The Nüenchamm (1,904 m (6,247 ft)) is a mountain of the Glarus Alps, overlooking the Walensee in the canton of Glarus. It is located west of the Mürtschenstock, between the Linth valley and the valley of the Talalpsee.
