= 2003 IBAD Para-Badminton World Championships =

Tournament details
- Dates: 5–8 June 2003
- Edition: 4th
- Venue: Welsh Institute of Sport
- Location: Cardiff, Wales

The 2003 IBAD Para-Badminton World Championships were held from 5 to 8 June 2003 in Cardiff, Wales. 12 events were contested in the tournament.

== Host city selection ==
Cardiff was chosen as the host city for the tournament in May 2003. The Welsh Institute of Sport was chosen as the venue for the tournament.

== Medalists ==
=== Men's events ===
Event	Gold	Silver	Bronze
Singles BMW2 (WH1)	(Germany) Avni Kertmen	(Germany) Friedhelm Hiby	(Germany) Manfred Steinhart
Singles BMW2 (WH1)	(Germany) Avni Kertmen	(Germany) Friedhelm Hiby	(Israel) Shimon Shalom
Singles BMW3 (WH2)	(Israel) Amir Levi	(Netherlands) Quincy Michielsen	(Israel) Moshe Zehavi
Singles BMW3 (WH2)	(Israel) Amir Levi	(Netherlands) Quincy Michielsen	(Israel) Yossi Baba
Singles BMSTL1 (SL3)	(Germany) Pascal Wolter	(Japan) Takayuki Taniguchi	(Germany) Jens Behnke
Singles BMSTL1 (SL3)	(Germany) Pascal Wolter	(Japan) Takayuki Taniguchi	(Japan) Koji Hemmi
Singles BMSTL3 (SL4)	(Chinese Taipei) Chuang Liang-tu	(Chinese Taipei) Chiang Chung-hou	(Japan) Takahito Takeyama
Singles BMSTL3 (SL4)	(Chinese Taipei) Chuang Liang-tu	(Chinese Taipei) Chiang Chung-hou	(Thailand) Adisak Saengarayakul
Singles BMSTU5 (SU5)	(Chinese Taipei) Lee Meng-yuan	(Germany) Frank Dietel	(Chinese Taipei) Chang Cheng-cheng
Singles BMSTU5 (SU5)	(Chinese Taipei) Lee Meng-yuan	(Germany) Frank Dietel	(Israel) Eyal Bachar
Doubles BMW2 (WH1)	(Germany) Avni Kertmen (Germany) Friedhelm Hiby	(Israel) Shalom Kalvanski (Israel) Shimon Shalom	(Germany) Klaus Pöhler (Germany) Manfred Steinhart
Doubles BMW2 (WH1)	(Germany) Avni Kertmen (Germany) Friedhelm Hiby	(Israel) Shalom Kalvanski (Israel) Shimon Shalom	(Spain) Rubén Pérez (Spain) Francisco Pineda
Doubles BMW3 (WH2)	(Israel) Amir Levi (Israel) Yossi Baba	(Netherlands) Ton Hollaar (Netherlands) Quincy Michielsen	(Israel) Makbel Shefanya (Israel) Moshe Zehavi
Doubles BMW3 (WH2)	(Israel) Amir Levi (Israel) Yossi Baba	(Netherlands) Ton Hollaar (Netherlands) Quincy Michielsen	(Israel) Oren Avraham (Israel) Moshe Bar-Hen
Doubles BMSTL3 (SL4)	(Chinese Taipei) Chiang Chung-hou (Chinese Taipei) Chuang Liang-tu	(Thailand) Vatchera Kosintharobol (Thailand) Adisak Saengarayakul	(Japan) Koji Hemmi (Japan) Masashi Sugimoto
Doubles BMSTL3 (SL4)	(Chinese Taipei) Chiang Chung-hou (Chinese Taipei) Chuang Liang-tu	(Thailand) Vatchera Kosintharobol (Thailand) Adisak Saengarayakul	(Japan) Takahito Takeyama (Japan) Takayuki Taniguchi
Doubles BMSTU5 (SU5)	(Chinese Taipei) Chang Cheng-cheng (Chinese Taipei) Lee Meng-yuan	(England) Antony Forster (England) Stuart Masters	(Israel) Igor Kil (Israel) Igor Neporozhnev
Doubles BMSTU5 (SU5)	(Chinese Taipei) Chang Cheng-cheng (Chinese Taipei) Lee Meng-yuan	(England) Antony Forster (England) Stuart Masters	(Israel) Eyal Bachar (Germany) Frank Dietel

=== Women's events ===
Event	Gold	Silver	Bronze
Singles BMW2+3 (WH1–WH2)	(Netherlands) Carol de Meijer	(Netherlands) Anneke Wassink	(Germany) Sonja Räthel
Singles BMW2+3 (WH1–WH2)	(Netherlands) Carol de Meijer	(Netherlands) Anneke Wassink	(Germany) Marion Maasch
Doubles BMW2+3 (WH1–WH2)	(Netherlands) Carol de Meijer (Netherlands) Anneke Wassink	(Germany) Marion Maasch (Germany) Sonja Räthel	(Spain) Sofia Balsalobre (Germany) Irmgard Wandt

=== Mixed events ===
Event	Gold	Silver	Bronze
Doubles BMW2+3 (WH1–WH2)	(Netherlands) Quincy Michielsen (Netherlands) Anneke Wassink	(Netherlands) Ton Hollaar (Netherlands) Carol de Meijer	(Germany) Georg Vogel (Germany) Sonja Räthel
Doubles BMW2+3 (WH1–WH2)	(Netherlands) Quincy Michielsen (Netherlands) Anneke Wassink	(Netherlands) Ton Hollaar (Netherlands) Carol de Meijer	(Germany) Thomas Wandschneider (Germany) Irmgard Wandt

== Medal table ==
Rank	Nation	Gold	Silver	Bronze	Total
1	Chinese Taipei	4	1	1	6
2	Netherlands	3	4	0	7
3	Germany	3	3	8	14
4	Israel	2	1	7.5	10.5
5	Thailand	0	1	1	2
6	England	0	1	0	1
7	Japan	0	0	4	4
8	Spain	0	0	1.5	1.5
Totals (8 entries)		12	11	23	46

== See also ==
- 2003 IBF World Championships
