= Luca Olgiati =

Swiss para-badminton player

Personal information
- Born: 16 June 1988 (age 38) Aargau, Switzerland

Sport
- Country: Switzerland
- Sport: Badminton
- Handedness: Left

Men's singles WH2 Men's doubles WH1–WH2 Mixed doubles WH1–WH2
- Highest ranking: 6 (MS 24 May 2022); 15 (MD with Yuri Ferrigno 18 June 2024); 8 (XD with Karin Suter-Erath 25 June 2019)
- Current ranking: 8 (MS); 16 (MD with Yuri Ferrigno) (8 October 2024)
- BWF profile
Medal record
Men's para-badminton
Representing Switzerland
European Para Championships
Silver medal – second place	2023 Rotterdam	Men's singles

Luca Olgiati (born 16 June 1988) is a Swiss para-badminton player. He won a silver medal in the men's singles WH2 event at the 2023 European Para Championships. Olgiati represented Switzerland in the men's singles WH2 event at the 2024 Summer Paralympics but was eliminated in the group stage.

== Biography ==
In February 2016, Olgiati suffered injuries from a snowboarding accident while skiing down the Fribourg Alps and became partially paralyzed. His spinal cord is not completely severed and he still had little control in his legs.

== Achievements ==
=== European Para Championships ===
Men's singles WH2
Year	Venue	Opponent	Score	Result
2023	Rotterdam Ahoy, Rotterdam, Netherlands	(Germany) Rick Hellmann	11–21, 21–15, 13–21	Silver

=== BWF Para Badminton World Circuit (1 title) ===
The BWF Para Badminton World Circuit – Grade 2, Level 1, 2 and 3 tournaments has been sanctioned by the Badminton World Federation from 2022.

Men's singles WH2
Year	Tournament	Level	Opponent	Score	Result
2022	Spanish Para-Badminton International II	Level 2	(Malaysia) Noor Azwan Noorlan	11–21, 21–18, 21–13	(gold) Winner

=== International tournaments (2011–2021) (1 title, 4 runners-up) ===
Men's singles WH2
Year	Tournament	Opponent	Score	Result
2018	Denmark Para-Badminton International	(India) Sanjeev Kumar	18–21, 11–21	(silver) Runner-up
2021	Spanish Para-Badminton International	(South Korea) Kim Jung-jun	10–21, 12–21	(silver) Runner-up

Mixed doubles WH1–WH2
Year	Tournament	Partner	Opponent	Score	Result
2019	Dubai Para-Badminton International	(Switzerland) Karin Suter-Erath	(China) Qu Zimo (China) Liu Yutong	5–21, 10–21	(silver) Runner-up
2019	Denmark Para-Badminton International	(Switzerland) Cynthia Mathez	(Brazil) Marcelo Alves Conceição (Belgium) To Man-kei	21–12, 18–21, 21–12	(gold) Winner
2021	Dubai Para-Badminton International	(Switzerland) Karin Suter-Erath	(India) Prem Kumar Ale (Russia) Tatiana Gureeva	11–21, 18–21	(silver) Runner-up
