= Spaneggsee =

Lake in Glarus, Switzerland

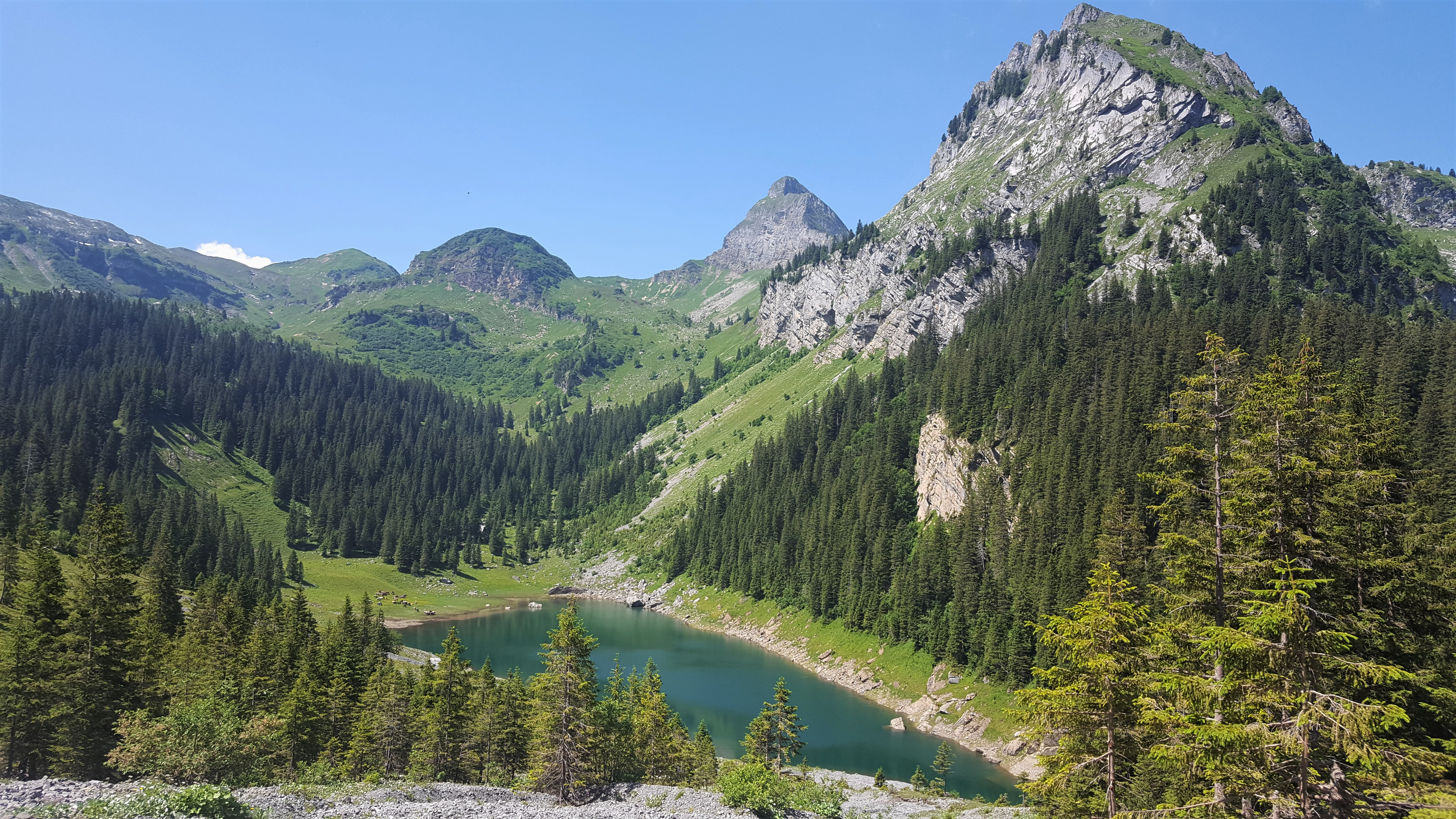
- Spaneggsee with Schijenstock, Fronalpstock, Färistock and Schilt (from right to left)

- Location within Canton of Glarus Location within Switzerland Location within Alps
- Interactive map of Spaneggsee
- Location: Filzbach, Glarus
- Coordinates: 47°04′30″N 9°07′50″E
- Basin countries: Switzerland
- Surface area: 4.7 ha (12 acres)
- Surface elevation: 1,425 m (4,675 ft)

Spaneggsee is a lake in Filzbach, Glarus, Switzerland. Its surface area is 4.7 ha (12 acres).

== See also ==
- List of mountain lakes of Switzerland
