= 2007 IBAD Para-Badminton World Championships =

Tournament details
- Dates: 27 October – 3 November 2007
- Edition: 6th
- Venue: Gymnasium 1, Bangkok Youth Center
- Location: Bangkok, Thailand

The 2007 IBAD Para-Badminton World Championships (Thai: แบดมินตันคนพิการชิงแชมป์โลก 2007) were held from 27 October to 3 November 2007 in Bangkok, Thailand. 24 events were contested in the tournament.

== Host city selection ==
Bangkok was chosen as the host city for the tournament in April 2007. Gymnasium 1, located inside the Bangkok Youth Center was selected as the venue for the tournament.

== Medalists ==
=== Men's events ===
Event	Gold	Silver	Bronze
Singles BMW2 (WH1)	(South Korea) Lee Sam-seop	(South Korea) Choi Jung-man	(Japan) Osamu Nagashima
Singles BMW2 (WH1)	(South Korea) Lee Sam-seop	(South Korea) Choi Jung-man	(Turkey) Avni Kertmen
Singles BMW3 (WH2)	(Netherlands) Quincy Michielsen	(Malaysia) Madzlan Saibon	(Israel) Amir Levi
Singles BMW3 (WH2)	(Netherlands) Quincy Michielsen	(Malaysia) Madzlan Saibon	(South Korea) An Gyeong-hwan
Singles BMSTL1 (SL3)	(Thailand) Subpong Meepian	(Japan) Takayuki Taniguchi	(Hong Kong) Tsang Chiu Pong
Singles BMSTL1 (SL3)	(Thailand) Subpong Meepian	(Japan) Takayuki Taniguchi	(India) Pramod Bhagat
Singles BMSTL2 (SL3a)	(Germany) Pascal Wolter	(Japan) Toshiaki Suenaga	(Chinese Taipei) Hsu Jen-ho
Singles BMSTL2 (SL3a)	(Germany) Pascal Wolter	(Japan) Toshiaki Suenaga	(South Korea) Kim Chang-man
Singles BMSTL3 (SL4)	(Hong Kong) Yu Kwong Wah	(Chinese Taipei) Chuang Liang-tu	(Malaysia) Ahmad Abdul Rahman
Singles BMSTL3 (SL4)	(Hong Kong) Yu Kwong Wah	(Chinese Taipei) Chuang Liang-tu	(Malaysia) Bakri Omar
Singles BMSTU4 (SU5a)	(Japan) Tetsuo Ura	(Hong Kong) Jeffrey Zee	(India) Satyam Janapareddi
Singles BMSTU4 (SU5a)	(Japan) Tetsuo Ura	(Hong Kong) Jeffrey Zee	(Sri Lanka) Upul Bandara
Singles BMSTU5 (SU5b)	(Malaysia) Cheah Liek Hou	(Spain) Juan Bretones	(India) Raj Kumar
Singles BMSTU5 (SU5b)	(Malaysia) Cheah Liek Hou	(Spain) Juan Bretones	(India) Rakesh Pandey
Doubles BMW2 (WH1)	(South Korea) Choi Jung-man (South Korea) Lee Sam-seop	(Turkey) Avni Kertmen (Germany) Thomas Wandschneider	(Netherlands) Ferdinand Hoeke (Switzerland) Walter Rauber
Doubles BMW2 (WH1)	(South Korea) Choi Jung-man (South Korea) Lee Sam-seop	(Turkey) Avni Kertmen (Germany) Thomas Wandschneider	(France) David Toupé (Israel) Shimon Shalom
Doubles BMW3 (WH2)	(Israel) Amir Levi (Israel) Makbel Shefanya	(South Korea) Kim Young-min (South Korea) An Gyeong-hwan	(Malaysia) Mohd Fairuz Amjad Rohaizat (Malaysia) Madzlan Saibon
Doubles BMW3 (WH2)	(Israel) Amir Levi (Israel) Makbel Shefanya	(South Korea) Kim Young-min (South Korea) An Gyeong-hwan	(Netherlands) Ton Hollaar (Netherlands) Quincy Michielsen
Doubles BMSTL1 (SL3a)	(Thailand) Subpong Meepian (Thailand) Bunjob Wongkumkerl	(Hong Kong) Tung Fung Kwong (Hong Kong) Tsang Chiu Pong	(India) Pramod Bhagat (India) Himagiri Yernagula
Doubles BMSTL2 (SL3b)	(Japan) Toshiaki Suenaga (Japan) Takayuki Taniguchi	(Malaysia) Chin Syu Khui (Malaysia) Tan Hwa Koon	(South Korea) Kim Chang-man (South Korea) Lee Chun-ui
Doubles BMSTL2 (SL3b)	(Japan) Toshiaki Suenaga (Japan) Takayuki Taniguchi	(Malaysia) Chin Syu Khui (Malaysia) Tan Hwa Koon	(Malaysia) Azman Ali (Malaysia) Jasmi Tegol
Doubles BMSTL3 (SL4)	(Chinese Taipei) Chuang Liang-tu (Chinese Taipei) Lin Cheng-che	(South Korea) Jun Dong-chun (South Korea) Kim Jae-hoon	(Malaysia) Bakri Omar (Malaysia) Hairol Fozi Saaba
Doubles BMSTL3 (SL4)	(Chinese Taipei) Chuang Liang-tu (Chinese Taipei) Lin Cheng-che	(South Korea) Jun Dong-chun (South Korea) Kim Jae-hoon	(Thailand) Somsak Kleedyeeson (Thailand) Adisak Saengarayakul
Doubles BMSTU4 (SU5a)	(Japan) Yoshiaki Mori (Japan) Tetsuo Ura	(Hong Kong) Lam Tak Kwan (Hong Kong) Jeffrey Zee	(India) Satyam Janapareddi (India) D. V. A. S. Raghuram
Doubles BMSTU5 (SU5b)	(Malaysia) Cheah Liek Hou (Malaysia) Suhaili Laiman	(India) Raj Kumar (India) Rakesh Pandey	(Chinese Taipei) Lee Meng-yuan (Chinese Taipei) Lin Tien-jen
Doubles BMSTU5 (SU5b)	(Malaysia) Cheah Liek Hou (Malaysia) Suhaili Laiman	(India) Raj Kumar (India) Rakesh Pandey	(Israel) Eyal Bachar (Germany) Frank Dietel

=== Women's events ===
Event	Gold	Silver	Bronze
Singles BMW2 (WH1)	(South Korea) Lee Ae-kyung	(South Korea) Lee Mi-ok	(Germany) Elke Rongen
Singles BMW2 (WH1)	(South Korea) Lee Ae-kyung	(South Korea) Lee Mi-ok	(Thailand) Piyawan Thinjun
Singles BMW3 (WH2)	(Netherlands) Carol de Meijer-Bradley	(South Korea) Yoon Jong-mi	(Israel) Inna Mashikovsky
Singles BMW3 (WH2)	(Netherlands) Carol de Meijer-Bradley	(South Korea) Yoon Jong-mi	(Netherlands) Lia Schuring
Singles BMSTL2 (SL3)	(Japan) Aki Takahashi	(Thailand) Wandee Kamtam	(Hong Kong) Ng Lai Ling
Singles BMSTL2 (SL3)	(Japan) Aki Takahashi	(Thailand) Wandee Kamtam	(Thailand) Paramee Panyachaem
Singles BMSTL3 (SL4)	(India) Parul Parmar	(Thailand) Sudsaifon Yodpa	(Thailand) Nipada Saensupa
Singles BMSTL3 (SL4)	(India) Parul Parmar	(Thailand) Sudsaifon Yodpa	(Thailand) Chanida Srinavakul
Doubles BMW2 (WH1)	(South Korea) Lee Ae-kyung (South Korea) Lee Mi-ok	(Israel) Nina Gorodetzky (Germany) Elke Rongen	(Germany) Carola Bohn (Germany) Mine Korkmaz
Doubles BMW2 (WH1)	(South Korea) Lee Ae-kyung (South Korea) Lee Mi-ok	(Israel) Nina Gorodetzky (Germany) Elke Rongen	(Thailand) Laong Hebkaew (Thailand) Piyawan Thinjun
Doubles BMW3 (WH2)	(Netherlands) Carol de Meijer-Bradley (Netherlands) Lia Schuring	(Israel) Inna Mashikovsky (Netherlands) Peggy Weijers	(Thailand) Gerdngoen Thummasorn (Thailand) Amnouy Wetwithan
Doubles BMSTL3 (SL4)	(India) Charanjeet Kaur (India) Parul Parmar	(Thailand) Wandee Kamtam (Thailand) Nipada Saensupa	(Japan) Aki Takahashi (Japan) Ikumi Nakai

=== Mixed events ===
==== Individual ====
Event	Gold	Silver	Bronze
Doubles BMW2 (WH1)	(South Korea) Choi Jung-man (South Korea) Lee Mi-ok	(South Korea) Lee Sam-seop (South Korea) Lee Ae-kyung	(Israel) Shimon Shalom (Israel) Nina Gorodetzky
Doubles BMW2 (WH1)	(South Korea) Choi Jung-man (South Korea) Lee Mi-ok	(South Korea) Lee Sam-seop (South Korea) Lee Ae-kyung	(Germany) Manfred Steinhart (Germany) Elke Rongen
Doubles BMW3 (WH2)	(Israel) Amir Levi (Israel) Inna Mashikovsky	(South Korea) An Gyeong-hwan (South Korea) Yoon Jong-mi	(Netherlands) Ferdinand Hoeke (Netherlands) Peggy Weijers
Doubles BMW3 (WH2)	(Israel) Amir Levi (Israel) Inna Mashikovsky	(South Korea) An Gyeong-hwan (South Korea) Yoon Jong-mi	(Netherlands) Quincy Michielsen (Netherlands) Carol de Meijer-Bradley

==== Team ====
Event	Gold	Silver	Bronze
Team BMSTL1–STU5 (SL3–SU5)	Malaysia	Hong Kong	South Korea
Team BMSTL1–STU5 (SL3–SU5)	Malaysia	Hong Kong	Germany

== Medal table ==
Rank	Nation	Gold	Silver	Bronze	Total
1	South Korea	5	7	4	16
2	Japan	4	2	2	8
3	Malaysia	3	2	5	10
4	Netherlands	3	0.5	4.5	8
5	Thailand	2	3	7	12
6	India	2	1	6	9
7	Israel	2	1	4	7
8	Hong Kong	1	4	2	7
9	Germany	1	1	4.5	6.5
10	Chinese Taipei	1	1	2	4
11	Spain	0	1	0	1
12	Turkey	0	0.5	1	1.5
13	Sri Lanka	0	0	1	1
14	France	0	0	0.5	0.5
14	Switzerland	0	0	0.5	0.5
Totals (15 entries)		24	24	44	92

== Team event ==
11 teams took part in the standing team event. Malaysia won the event by defeating Hong Kong 2–1 in the final.

=== Bracket ===
Round of 16
South Korea	2
Spain	1
Japan	0
Germany	2
Russia	0
Hong Kong	2

Quarter-finals
Malaysia	2
Sri Lanka	0
Israel	1
South Korea	2
Germany	2
Thailand	1
Hong Kong	2
Chinese Taipei	0

Semi-finals
Malaysia	2
South Korea	0
Germany	1
Hong Kong	2

Final
Malaysia	2
Hong Kong	1

== See also ==
- 2007 BWF World Championships
