= Badminton at the 2023 European Para Championships – Men's singles WH2 =

Badminton's men's singles WH2 at the 2023 European Para Championships
- Venue: Rotterdam Ahoy, Rotterdam
- Dates: 15 – 20 August
- Competitors: 11 from 9 nations

Medalists
gold medal	Rick Hellmann	Germany
silver medal	Luca Olgiati	Switzerland
bronze medal	Thomas Jakobs	France
bronze medal	Amir Levi	Israel

The men's singles WH2 badminton tournament at the 2023 European Para Championships was played from 15 to 20 August 2023 in Rotterdam Ahoy, Rotterdam. A total of 11 players competed at the tournament, three of whom was seeded.

== Competition schedule ==
Play took place between 15 and 20 August.

GS	Group stage	¼	Quarterfinals	½	Semifinals	F	Final

Events	Tue 15	Wed 16	Thu 17	Fri 18	Sat 19	Sun 20
Men's singles WH2	GS	GS	GS	¼	½	F

== Seeds ==
The following players were seeded:

1. Rick Hellmann (GER) (champion; gold medalist)
2. Amir Levi (ISR) (semi-finals; bronze medalist)
3. Thomas Jakobs (FRA) (semi-finals; bronze medalist)

== Group stage ==
=== Group A ===
Pos	Team	Pld	W	L	GF	GA	GD	PF	PA	PD	Qualification
1	Rick Hellmann (GER) [1]	2	2	0	4	0	+4	84	30	+54	Qualification to elimination stage
2	Gobi Ranganathan (GBR)	2	1	1	2	2	0	59	76	−17	Qualification to elimination stage
3	Lars Porrenga (SUI)	2	0	2	0	4	−4	47	84	−37	

Source: Group A – standings

Date		Score		Game 1	Game 2	Game 3
15 August	Rick Hellmann (Germany)	2–0	(Switzerland) Lars Porrenga	21–3	21–10	
16 August	Rick Hellmann (Germany)	2–0	(United Kingdom) Gobi Ranganathan	21–6	21–11	
17 August	Lars Porrenga (Switzerland)	0–2	(United Kingdom) Gobi Ranganathan	19–21	15–21	

=== Group B ===
Pos	Team	Pld	W	L	GF	GA	GD	PF	PA	PD	Qualification
1	Amir Levi (ISR) [2]	3	3	0	6	1	+5	139	78	+61	Qualification to elimination stage
2	Ignacio Fernández (ESP)	3	2	1	4	3	+1	128	113	+15	Qualification to elimination stage
3	Marc Elmer (SUI)	3	1	2	4	4	0	134	128	+6	
4	Piero Rosario Suma (ITA)	3	0	3	0	6	−6	44	126	−82	

Source: Group B – standings

Date		Score		Game 1	Game 2	Game 3
15 August	Amir Levi (Israel)	2–0	(Spain) Ignacio Fernández	21–11	21–14	
15 August	Piero Rosario Suma (Italy)	0–2	(Switzerland) Marc Elmer	9–21	3–21	
16 August	Ignacio Fernández (Spain)	2–1	(Switzerland) Marc Elmer	19–21	21–18	21–15
16 August	Amir Levi (Israel)	2–0	(Italy) Piero Rosario Suma	21–7	21–8	
17 August	Amir Levi (Israel)	2–1	(Switzerland) Marc Elmer	13–21	21–11	21–6
17 August	Ignacio Fernández (Spain)	2–0	(Italy) Piero Rosario Suma	21–9	21–8	

=== Group C ===
Pos	Team	Pld	W	L	GF	GA	GD	PF	PA	PD	Qualification
1	Luca Olgiati (SUI)	3	3	0	6	0	+6	126	51	+75	Qualification to elimination stage
2	Thomas Jakobs (FRA) [3]	3	2	1	4	2	+2	112	68	+44	Qualification to elimination stage
3	Gregor Anderson (GBR)	3	1	2	2	4	−2	72	103	−31	
4	Milan Zelen (SRB)	3	0	3	0	6	−6	38	126	−88	

Source: Group C – standings

Date		Score		Game 1	Game 2	Game 3
15 August	Gregor Anderson (United Kingdom)	2–0	(Serbia) Milan Zelen	21–10	21–9	
15 August	Thomas Jakobs (France)	0–2	(Switzerland) Luca Olgiati	13–21	15–21	
16 August	Thomas Jakobs (France)	2–0	(United Kingdom) Gregor Anderson	21–7	21–9	
16 August	Luca Olgiati (Switzerland)	2–0	(Serbia) Milan Zelen	21–4	21–5	
17 August	Luca Olgiati (Switzerland)	2–0	(United Kingdom) Gregor Anderson	21–6	21–8	
17 August	Thomas Jakobs (France)	2–0	(Serbia) Milan Zelen	21–5	21–5	

== Elimination stage ==
Quarter-finals
3	Thomas Jakobs (FRA)	21	21
Ignacio Fernández (ESP)	14	9
Gobi Ranganathan (GBR)	3	3
Luca Olgiati (SUI)	21	21

Semi-finals
1	Rick Hellmann (GER)	21	21
3	Thomas Jakobs (FRA)	14	17
Luca Olgiati (SUI)	14	22	22
2	Amir Levi (ISR)	21	20	20

Final
1	Rick Hellmann (GER)	21	15	21
Luca Olgiati (SUI)	11	21	13
