= Jeong Jae-gun =

South Korean para-badminton player

Personal information
- Born: 22 November 1976 (age 49) Gyeongju, South Korea
- Height: 1.70 m (5 ft 7 in)

Sport
- Country: South Korea
- Sport: Badminton
- Handedness: Right

Men's singles WH1 Men's doubles WH1–WH2 Mixed doubles WH1–WH2
- Highest ranking: 4 (MS 27 August 2024); 3 (MD with Yu Soo-young 11 April 2023); 12 (XD with Jung Gye-oul 29 November 2022)
- Current ranking: 5 (MS); 3 (MD with Yu Soo-young) (3 September 2024)
- BWF profile
Medal record
Men's para-badminton
Representing South Korea
Paralympic Games
Silver medal – second place	2024 Paris	Men's doubles
World Championships
Silver medal – second place	2022 Tokyo	Men's singles
Bronze medal – third place	2022 Tokyo	Men's doubles
Bronze medal – third place	2024 Pattaya	Men's singles

Jeong Jae-gun (Korean: 정재군; Hanja: 郑在健, born 22 November 1976) is a South Korean para-badminton player. He competed at the 2024 Summer Paralympics, where he reached the gold medal match of the men's doubles WH1–WH2 event with Yu Soo-young.

== Biography ==
Jeong became disabled in 2007 after suffering a spinal fracture while working. He started exercising while hanging out with disabled badminton players at a rehabilitation hospital.

== Achievements ==
=== Paralympic Games ===
Men's doubles WH1–WH2

Year	Venue	Partner	Opponent	Score	Result
2024	Porte de la Chapelle Arena, Paris, France	(South Korea) Yu Soo-young	(China) Mai Jianpeng (China) Qu Zimo	10–21, 12–21	Silver

=== World Championships ===
Men's singles WH1
Year	Venue	Opponent	Score	Result
2022	Yoyogi National Gymnasium; Tokyo, Japan	(South Korea) Kim Jung-jun	9–21, 17–21	Silver
2024	Pattaya Exhibition and Convention Hall; Pattaya, Thailand	(China) Qu Zimo	14–21, 4–21	Bronze

Men's doubles WH1–WH2
Year	Venue	Partner	Opponent	Score	Result
2022	Yoyogi National Gymnasium; Tokyo, Japan	(South Korea) Yu Soo-young	(Germany) Rick Hellmann (Germany) Thomas Wandschneider	13–21, 21–18, 22–24	Bronze

=== BWF Para Badminton World Circuit (4 titles, 3 runners-up) ===
The BWF Para Badminton World Circuit – Grade 2, Level 1, 2 and 3 tournaments has been sanctioned by the Badminton World Federation from 2022.

Men's singles WH1
Year	Tournament	Level	Opponent	Score	Result
2022	Canada Para Badminton International	Level 1	(Japan) Hiroshi Murayama	21–10, 21–10	(gold) Winner
2022	Thailand Para Badminton International	Level 1	(Malaysia) Muhammad Ikhwan Ramli	23–21, 16–21, 19–21	(silver) Runner-up
2024	Spanish Para Badminton International II	Level 2	(Germany) Thomas Wandschneider	21–17, 23–25, 22–20	(gold) Winner

Men's doubles WH1–WH2
Year	Tournament	Level	Partner	Opponent	Score	Result
2022	Canada Para Badminton International	Level 1	(South Korea) Kim Jung-jun	(South Korea) Kim Kyung-hoon (South Korea) Lee Sam-seop	20–22, 21–11, 18–21	(silver) Runner-up
2022	Thailand Para Badminton International	Level 1	(South Korea) Yu Soo-young	(South Korea) Choi Jung-man (South Korea) Kim Jung-jun	9–21, 12–21	(silver) Runner-up
2024	Thailand Para Badminton International	Level 1	(South Korea) Yu Soo-young	(Germany) Rick Hellmann (Germany) Thomas Wandschneider	21–14, 21–12	(gold) Winner
2024	4 Nations Para Badminton International	Level 1	(South Korea) Yu Soo-young	(Japan) Daiki Kajiwara (Japan) Hiroshi Murayama	21–14, 21–14	(gold) Winner

=== International tournaments (from 2011 to 2021; 3 titles, 8 runners-up) ===
Men's singles WH1
Year	Tournament	Opponent	Score	Result
2015	China Para Badminton International	(South Korea) Lee Sam-seop	21–16, 16–21, 13–21	(silver) Runner-up
2017	Japan Para Badminton International	(South Korea) Lee Dong-seop	9–21, 11–21	(silver) Runner-up
2018	Irish Para Badminton International	(South Korea) Lee Sam-seop	21–15, 21–17	(gold) Winner
2018	Japan Para Badminton International	(South Korea) Lee Sam-seop	21–14, 21–17	(gold) Winner
2019	Irish Para Badminton International	(South Korea) Lee Sam-seop	19–21, 21–17, 17–21	(silver) Runner-up
2020	Brazil Para Badminton International	(South Korea) Lee Sam-seop	21–23, 17–21	(silver) Runner-up

Men's doubles WH1–WH2
Year	Tournament	Partner	Opponent	Score	Result
2018	Spanish Para Badminton International	(South Korea) Lee Sam-seop	(South Korea) Kim Jung-jun (South Korea) Lee Sam-seop	21–16, 11–21, 12–21	(silver) Runner-up
2018	Japan Para Badminton International	(South Korea) Lee Sam-seop	(South Korea) Kim Sung-hun (France) David Toupé	17–21, 22–20, 13–21	(silver) Runner-up
2019	Dubai Para Badminton International	(South Korea) Kim Jung-jun	(Japan) Daiki Kajiwara (Japan) Hiroshi Murayama	21–17, 21–7	(gold) Winner
2019	Thailand Para Badminton International	(South Korea) Kim Kyung-hoon	(South Korea) Kim Jung-jun (South Korea) Lee Sam-seop	21–19, 11–21, 22–24	(silver) Runner-up

Mixed doubles WH1–WH2
Year	Tournament	Partner	Opponent	Score	Result
2018	Irish Para Badminton International	(Peru) Pilar Jáuregui	(South Korea) Lee Sam-seop (South Korea) Lee Sun-ae	14–21, 14–21	(silver) Runner-up
