= Rick Hellmann =

German para-badminton player

Personal information
- Full name: Rick Cornell Hellmann
- Born: 26 January 1988 (age 38) Berlin, East Germany

Sport
- Country: Germany
- Sport: Badminton
- Handedness: Right
- Coached by: Jens Janisch

Men’s singles WH2 Men's doubles WH1–WH2
- Highest ranking: 3 (MS 22 August 2023); 2 (MD with Thomas Wandschneider 12 July 2022)
- Current ranking: 7 (MS); 5 (MD with Thomas Wandschneider) (8 October 2024)
- BWF profile
Medal record
Men's para-badminton
Representing Germany
World Championships
Gold medal – first place	2022 Tokyo	Men's doubles
European Para Championships
Gold medal – first place	2023 Rotterdam	Men's singles
Gold medal – first place	2023 Rotterdam	Men's doubles
European Championships
Bronze medal – third place	2018 Rodez	Men's singles
Bronze medal – third place	2018 Rodez	Men's doubles

Rick Cornell Hellmann (born 26 January 1988) is a German para-badminton player who is affiliated with the RSC Berlin Sports Club. Partnered with Thomas Wandschneider, the two were world champions in the men's doubles WH1–WH2 event at the 2022 BWF Para-Badminton World Championships.

He made his Paralympic debut at the 2024 Summer Paralympics where he competed in the men's singles WH2 event and the men's doubles WH1–WH2 event.

== Biography ==
Hellmann was born in Berlin to a German mother and a Congolese father. As a child, he was a competitive swimmer until he suffered paraplegia at the age of eleven, when it was discovered that an additional vein had grown from his heart directly into his spinal cord. He later discovered wheelchair fencing and became a runner-up in the foil event at the German National Wheelchair Fencing Championships.

He was introduced to para-badminton in 2014 when members of the RSC Berlin Sports Club approached him and invited him to train with other players.

Hellmann is currently a doctoral student in the Department of Experimental Neurology at the Charité– Berlin University of Medicine.

== Achievements ==
=== World Championships ===
Men's doubles WH1–WH2
Year	Venue	Partner	Opponent	Score	Result
2022	Yoyogi National Gymnasium; Tokyo, Japan	(Germany) Thomas Wandschneider	(Malaysia) Noor Azwan Noorlan (Malaysia) Muhammad Ikhwan Ramli	21–11, 21–15	Gold

=== European Para Championships ===
Men's singles WH1
Year	Venue	Opponent	Score	Result
2023	Rotterdam Ahoy, Rotterdam, Netherlands	(Switzerland) Luca Olgiati	21–11, 15–21, 21–13	Gold

Men's doubles WH1–WH2
Year	Venue	Partner	Opponent	Score	Result
2023	Rotterdam Ahoy; Rotterdam, Netherlands	(Germany) Thomas Wandschneider	(France) Thomas Jakobs (France) David Toupé	21–19, 21–18	Gold

=== European Championships ===
Men's singles WH1
Year	Venue	Opponent	Score	Result
2018	Amphitheatre Gymnasium, Rodez, France	(England) Martin Rooke	14–21, 9–21	Bronze

Men's doubles WH1–WH2
Year	Venue	Partner	Opponent	Score	Result
2018	Amphitheatre Gymnasium; Rodez, France	(Germany) Young-chin Mi	(England) Martin Rooke (Germany) Thomas Wandschneider	14–21, 19–21	Bronze

=== BWF Para Badminton World Circuit (1 title, 4 runners-up) ===
The BWF Para Badminton World Circuit – Grade 2, Level 1, 2 and 3 tournaments has been sanctioned by the Badminton World Federation from 2022.

Men's singles WH2
Year	Tournament	Level	Opponent	Score	Result
2022	Spanish Para-Badminton International	Level 1	(Japan) Daiki Kajiwara	9–21, 11–21	(silver) Runner-up

Men's doubles WH1–WH2
Year	Tournament	Level	Partner	Opponent	Score	Result
2022	Spanish Para-Badminton International II	Level 2	(Germany) Thomas Wandschneider	(Malaysia) Noor Azwan Noorlan (Malaysia) Muhammad Ikhwan Ramli	21–14, 21–14	(gold) Winner
2022	Bahrain Para-Badminton International	Level 2	(Germany) Thomas Wandschneider	(South Korea) Choi Jung-man (South Korea) Kim Jung-jun	21–12, 10–21, 11–21	(silver) Runner-up
2022	4 Nations Para-Badminton International	Level 1	(Germany) Thomas Wandschneider	(Malaysia) Noor Azwan Noorlan (Malaysia) Muhammad Ikhwan Ramli	22–20, 17–21, 11–21	(silver) Runner-up
2024	Spanish Para-Badminton International I	Level 1	(Germany) Thomas Wandschneider	(South Korea) Jeong Jae-gun (South Korea) Yu Soo-young	14–21, 12–21	(silver) Runner-up

=== International tournaments (2011–2021) (1 title, 2 runners-up) ===
Men's singles WH2
Year	Tournament	Opponent	Score	Result
2019	Denmark Para-Badminton International	(Japan) Daiki Kajiwara	9–21, 9–21	(silver) Runner-up
2021	Dubai Para-Badminton International	(Malaysia) Noor Azwan Noorlan	21–18, 18–21, 12–21	(silver) Runner-up

Men's doubles WH1–WH2
Year	Tournament	Partner	Opponent	Score	Result
2021	Uganda Para-Badminton International	(Germany) Thomas Wandschneider	(India) Prem Kumar Ale (India) Abu Hubaida	21–13, 21–13	(gold) Winner
