= Talalpsee =

Lake in Glarus, Switzerland

- Talsee
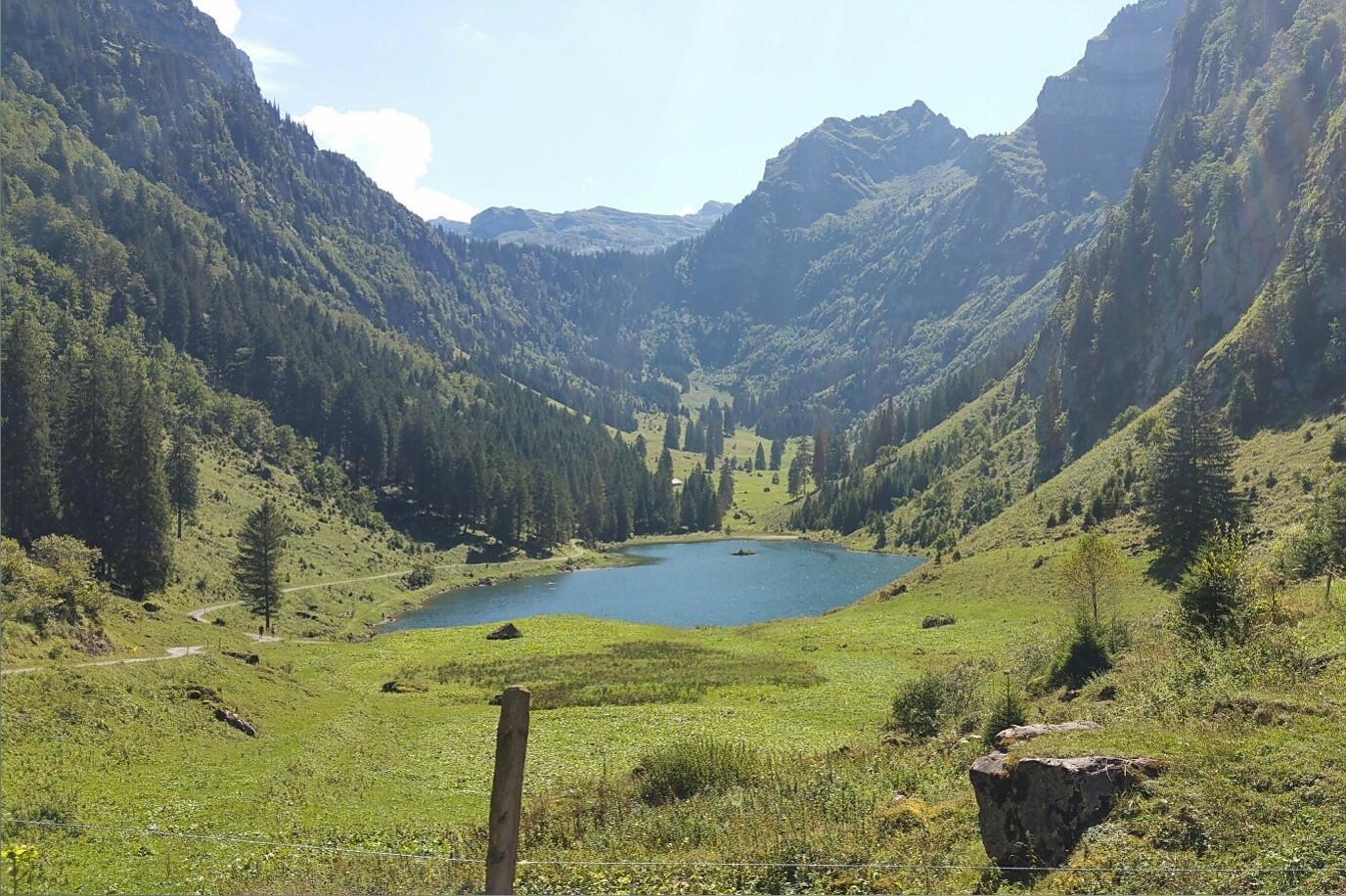

- Location within Canton of Glarus Location within Switzerland Location within Alps
- Interactive map of Talalpsee
- Location: Filzbach, Glarus
- Coordinates: 47°05′44″N 9°08′00″E
- Basin countries: Switzerland
- Surface area: 3.2 ha (7.9 acres)
- Average depth: 2.3 m (7 ft 7 in)
- Max. depth: 4 m (13 ft)
- Surface elevation: 1,086 m (3,563 ft)

Talalpsee or Talsee is a lake at an elevation of 1084 meters above sea level located over the village of Filzbach in the Canton of Glarus, Switzerland. Its surface area is 3.2 ha (7.9 acres).
