= Filzbach =

Village in Switzerland

- Former municipality
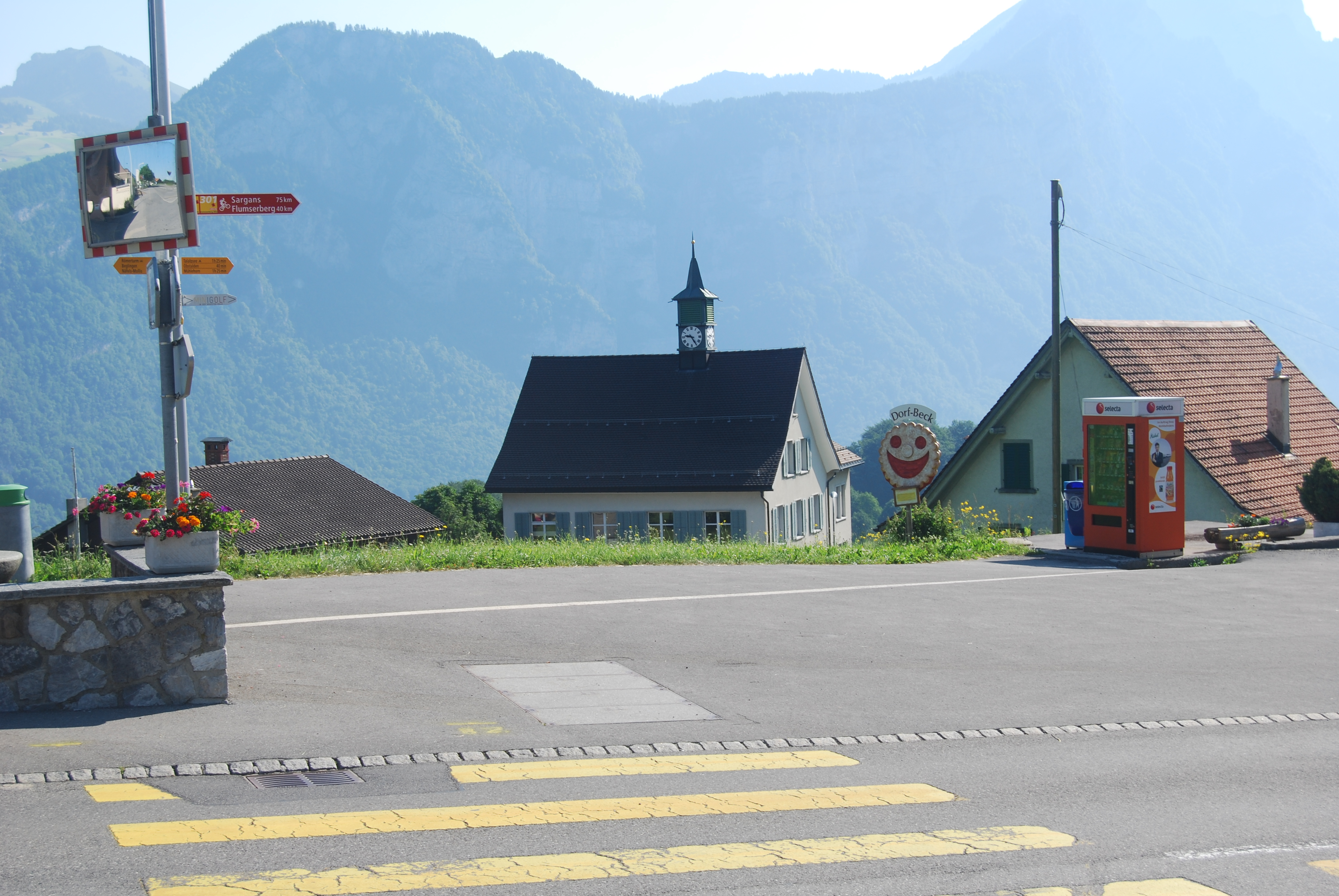

- Coat of arms
- Location of Filzbach
- Location within Switzerland Location within Canton of Glarus
- Coordinates: 47°07′N 9°08′E
- Country: Switzerland
- Canton: Glarus
- District: n.a.

Area
  - Total: 13.93 km^{2} (5.38 sq mi)
- Elevation: 682 m (2,238 ft)

Population (December 2020)
  - Total: 509
  - Density: 36.5/km^{2} (94.6/sq mi)
- Time zone: UTC+01:00 (CET)
  - Summer (DST): UTC+02:00 (CEST)
- Postal code: 8757
- SFOS number: 1608
- ISO 3166 code: CH-GL
- Surrounded by: Amden (SG), Ennenda, Mollis, Obstalden, Weesen (SG)
- Website: www.filzbach.ch

Filzbach is a former municipality in the canton of Glarus in Switzerland. Effective from 1 January 2011, Filzbach is part of the municipality of Glarus Nord.

== History ==
Filzbach is first mentioned in 1394 as Vilentzspach.

== Geography ==
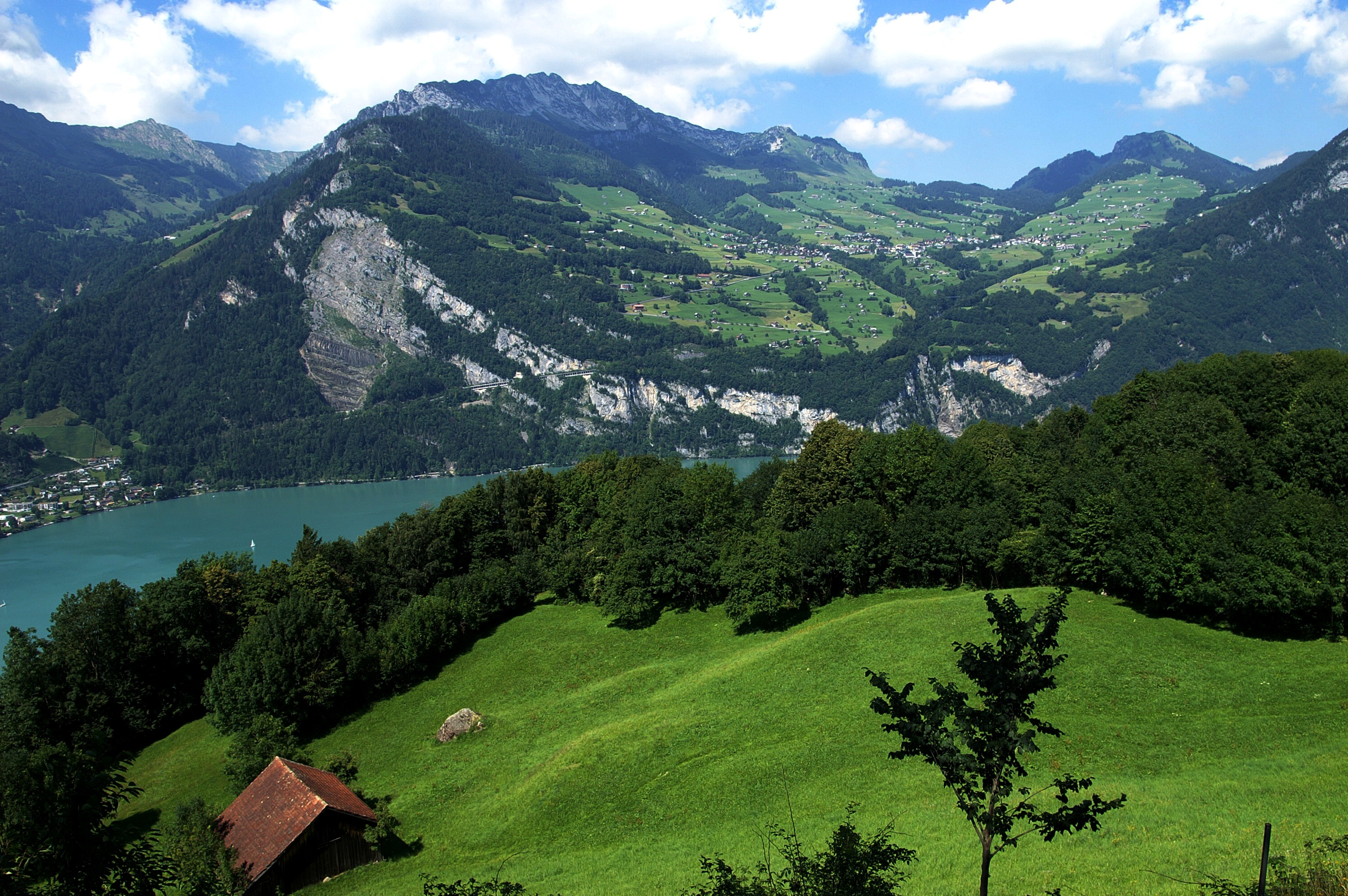
Amden and Walensee seen from Filzbach

Aerial view from 500 m by Walter Mittelholzer (1923)

Filzbach has an area, as of 2006, of 13.9 km^{2} (5.4 sq mi). Of this area, 35.4% is used for agricultural purposes, while 40.9% is forested. Of the rest of the land, 4.6% is settled (buildings or roads) and the remainder (19.1%) is non-productive (rivers, glaciers or mountains).

The municipality is located on a terrace of the Kerenzerberg mountain above the Walensee. Talalpsee and Spaneggsee are located above the lake.

== Demographics ==
Filzbach had a population (as of 2010) of 509. As of 2007, 10.2% of the population was made up of foreign nationals. Over the last 10 years the population has decreased at a rate of -6.7%. Most of the population (as of 2000) speaks German (92.6%), with Portuguese being second most common ( 1.3%) and Serbo-Croatian being third ( 1.3%).

In the 2007 federal election the most popular party was the SVP which received 50.9% of the vote. Most of the rest of the votes went to the SPS with 42.5% of the vote.

In Filzbach about 66.5% of the population (between age 25-64) have completed either non-mandatory upper secondary education or additional higher education (either University or a Fachhochschule).

Filzbach has an unemployment rate of 0.43%. As of 2005, there were 33 people employed in the primary economic sector and about 15 businesses involved in this sector. 2 people are employed in the secondary sector and there are 2 businesses in this sector. 190 people are employed in the tertiary sector, with 21 businesses in this sector.

The historical population is given in the following table:

| year | population |
|---|---|
| 1888 | 418 |
| 1900 | 407 |
| 1950 | 393 |
| 2000 | 542 |
