= Badminton at the 2023 European Para Championships – Men's singles WH1 =

Badminton's men's singles WH1 at the 2023 European Para Championships
- Venue: Rotterdam Ahoy, Rotterdam
- Dates: 15 – 20 August
- Competitors: 17 from 10 nations

Medalists
gold medal	Thomas Wandschneider	Germany
silver medal	David Toupé	France
bronze medal	Yuri Ferrigno	Italy
bronze medal	Konstantin Afinogenov	Israel

The men's singles WH1 badminton tournament at the 2023 European Para Championships was played from 15 to 20 August 2023 in Rotterdam Ahoy, Rotterdam. A total of 17 players competed at the tournament, five of whom was seeded.

== Competition schedule ==
Play took place between 15 and 20 August.

GS	Group stage	R16	Round of 16	¼	Quarterfinals	½	Semifinals	F	Final

Events	Tue 15	Wed 16	Thu 17	Fri 18		Sat 19	Sun 20
Men's singles WH1	GS	GS	GS	R16	¼	½	F

== Seeds ==
The following players were seeded:

1. Thomas Wandschneider (GER) (champion; gold medalist)
2. David Toupé (FRA) (final; silver medalist)
3. Yuri Ferrigno (ITA) (semi-finals; bronze medalist)
4. Konstantin Afinogenov (ISR) (semi-finals; bronze medalist)
5. Francisco Motero (ESP) (quarter-finals)

== Group stage ==
=== Group A ===
Pos	Team	Pld	W	L	GF	GA	GD	PF	PA	PD	Qualification
1	Thomas Wandschneider (GER) [1]	2	2	0	4	0	+4	84	21	+63	Qualification to elimination stage
2	Zbyněk Sýkora (CZE)	2	1	1	2	2	0	49	59	−10	Qualification to elimination stage
3	Dražen Mikšić (SRB)	2	0	2	0	4	−4	31	84	−53	

Source: Group A – standings

Date		Score		Game 1	Game 2	Game 3
15 August	Thomas Wandschneider (Germany)	2–0	(Serbia) Dražen Mikšić	21–3	21–11	
16 August	Thomas Wandschneider (Germany)	2–0	(Czech Republic) Zbyněk Sýkora	21–4	21–3	
17 August	Dražen Mikšić (Serbia)	0–2	(Czech Republic) Zbyněk Sýkora	7–21	10–21	

=== Group B ===
Pos	Team	Pld	W	L	GF	GA	GD	PF	PA	PD	Qualification
1	David Toupé (FRA) [2]	2	2	0	4	0	+4	84	17	+67	Qualification to elimination stage
2	Jan Matoušek (CZE)	2	1	1	2	3	−1	69	94	−25	Qualification to elimination stage
3	Brent Van Der Kelen (BEL)	2	0	2	1	4	−3	60	102	−42	

Source: Group B – standings

Date		Score		Game 1	Game 2	Game 3
15 August	David Toupé (France)	2–0	(Czech Republic) Jan Matoušek	21–4	21–5	
16 August	David Toupé (France)	2–0	(Belgium) Brent Van Der Kelen	21–5	21–3	
17 August	Jan Matoušek (Czech Republic)	2–1	(Belgium) Brent Van Der Kelen	22–20	17–21	21–11

=== Group C ===
Pos	Team	Pld	W	L	GF	GA	GD	PF	PA	PD	Qualification
1	Yuri Ferrigno (ITA) [3/4]	2	2	0	4	0	+4	84	24	+60	Qualification to elimination stage
2	Chris Stewart (IRL)	2	1	1	2	3	−1	70	94	−24	Qualification to elimination stage
3	Lukáš Kyncl (CZE)	2	0	2	1	4	−3	66	102	−36	

Source: Group C – standings

Date		Score		Game 1	Game 2	Game 3
15 August	Yuri Ferrigno (Italy)	2–0	(Czech Republic) Lukáš Kyncl	21–9	21–5	
16 August	Yuri Ferrigno (Italy)	2–0	(Republic of Ireland) Chris Stewart	21–3	21–7	
17 August	Lukáš Kyncl (Czech Republic)	1–2	(Republic of Ireland) Chris Stewart	21–18	13–21	18–21

=== Group D ===
Pos	Team	Pld	W	L	GF	GA	GD	PF	PA	PD	Qualification
1	Konstantin Afinogenov (ISR) [3/4]	3	3	0	6	0	+6	126	28	+98	Qualification to elimination stage
2	Owen Kilburn (GBR)	3	2	1	4	2	+2	99	74	+25	Qualification to elimination stage
3	Miloš Bauer (CZE)	3	1	2	2	4	−2	78	99	−21	
4	Michael Smith (IRL)	3	0	3	0	6	−6	24	126	−102	

Source: Group D – standings

Date		Score		Game 1	Game 2	Game 3
15 August	Konstantin Afinogenov (Israel)	2–0	(Republic of Ireland) Michael Smith	21–4	21–2	
15 August	Miloš Bauer (Czech Republic)	0–2	(United Kingdom) Owen Kilburn	19–21	10–21	
16 August	Konstantin Afinogenov (Israel)	2–0	(Czech Republic) Miloš Bauer	21–1	21–6	
16 August	Michael Smith (Republic of Ireland)	0–2	(United Kingdom) Owen Kilburn	1–21	2–21	
17 August	Michael Smith (Republic of Ireland)	0–2	(Czech Republic) Miloš Bauer	9–21	6–21	
17 August	Konstantin Afinogenov (Israel)	2–0	(United Kingdom) Owen Kilburn	21–8	21–7	

=== Group E ===
Pos	Team	Pld	W	L	GF	GA	GD	PF	PA	PD	Qualification
1	Francisco Motero (ESP) [5]	3	3	0	6	1	+5	143	76	+67	Qualification to elimination stage
2	Stephen Durand (FRA)	3	2	1	5	2	+3	129	102	+27	Qualification to elimination stage
3	Kamil Šnajdar (CZE)	3	1	2	2	4	−2	89	116	−27	
4	Vincenco Contemi (ITA)	3	0	3	0	6	−6	59	126	−67	

Source: Group E – standings

Date		Score		Game 1	Game 2	Game 3
15 August	Francisco Motero (Spain)	2–0	(Czech Republic) Kamil Šnajdar	21–10	21–11	
15 August	Stephen Durand (France)	2–0	(Italy) Vincenco Contemi	21–12	21–5	
16 August	Francisco Motero (Spain)	2–1	(France) Stephen Durand	21–11	17–21	21–13
16 August	Kamil Šnajdar (Czech Republic)	2–0	(Italy) Vincenco Contemi	21–18	21–14	
17 August	Kamil Šnajdar (Czech Republic)	0–2	(France) Stephen Durand	17–21	9–21	
17 August	Francisco Motero (Spain)	2–0	(Italy) Vincenco Contemi	21–5	21–5	

== Elimination stage ==
Round of 16
Zbyněk Sýkora (CZE)	21	21
Chris Stewart (IRL)	3	11
Owen Kilburn (GBR)	11	17
Stephen Durand (FRA)	21	21

Quarter-finals
1	Thomas Wandschneider (GER)	21	21
Zbyněk Sýkora (CZE)	4	4
3/4	Yuri Ferrigno (ITA)	10	21	21
5	Francisco Motero (ESP)	21	10	16
Jan Matoušek (CZE)	3	2
3/4	Konstantin Afinogenov (ISR)	21	21
Stephen Durand (FRA)	8	11
2	David Toupé (FRA)	21	21

Semi-finals
1	Thomas Wandschneider (GER)	21	21
3/4	Yuri Ferrigno (ITA)	11	12
3/4	Konstantin Afinogenov (ISR)	22	19	10
2	David Toupé (FRA)	20	21	21

Final
1	Thomas Wandschneider (GER)	21	21
2	David Toupé (FRA)	15	17
