= La Rinconada, Andalusia =

La Rinconada, Spain
- City
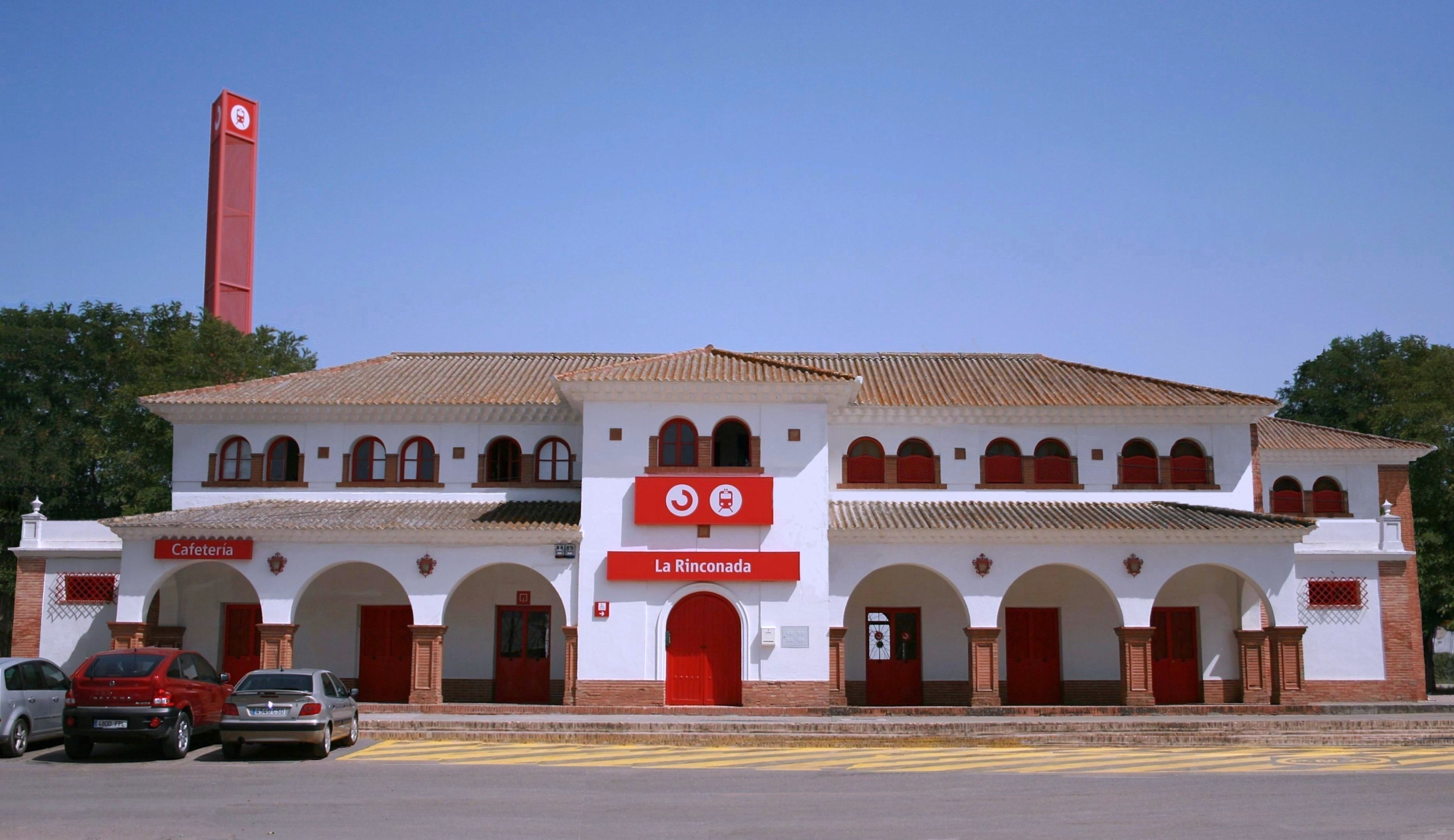
- La Rinconada Cercanías train station

- Flag Coat of arms

- Location in La Rinconada, Spain (Spain)
- Coordinates: 37°29′N 5°58′W
- Country: Spain
- Province: Seville
- Municipality: La Rinconada

Area
  - Total: 140 km^{2} (54 sq mi)
- Elevation: 13 m (43 ft)

Population (2025-01-01)
  - Total: 40,724
  - Density: 290/km^{2} (750/sq mi)
- Time zone: UTC+1 (CET)
  - Summer (DST): UTC+2 (CEST)

La Rinconada is a municipality located in the province of Seville, Andalusia, Spain. According to the 2020 census (INE), the city has a population of 39,062 inhabitants.

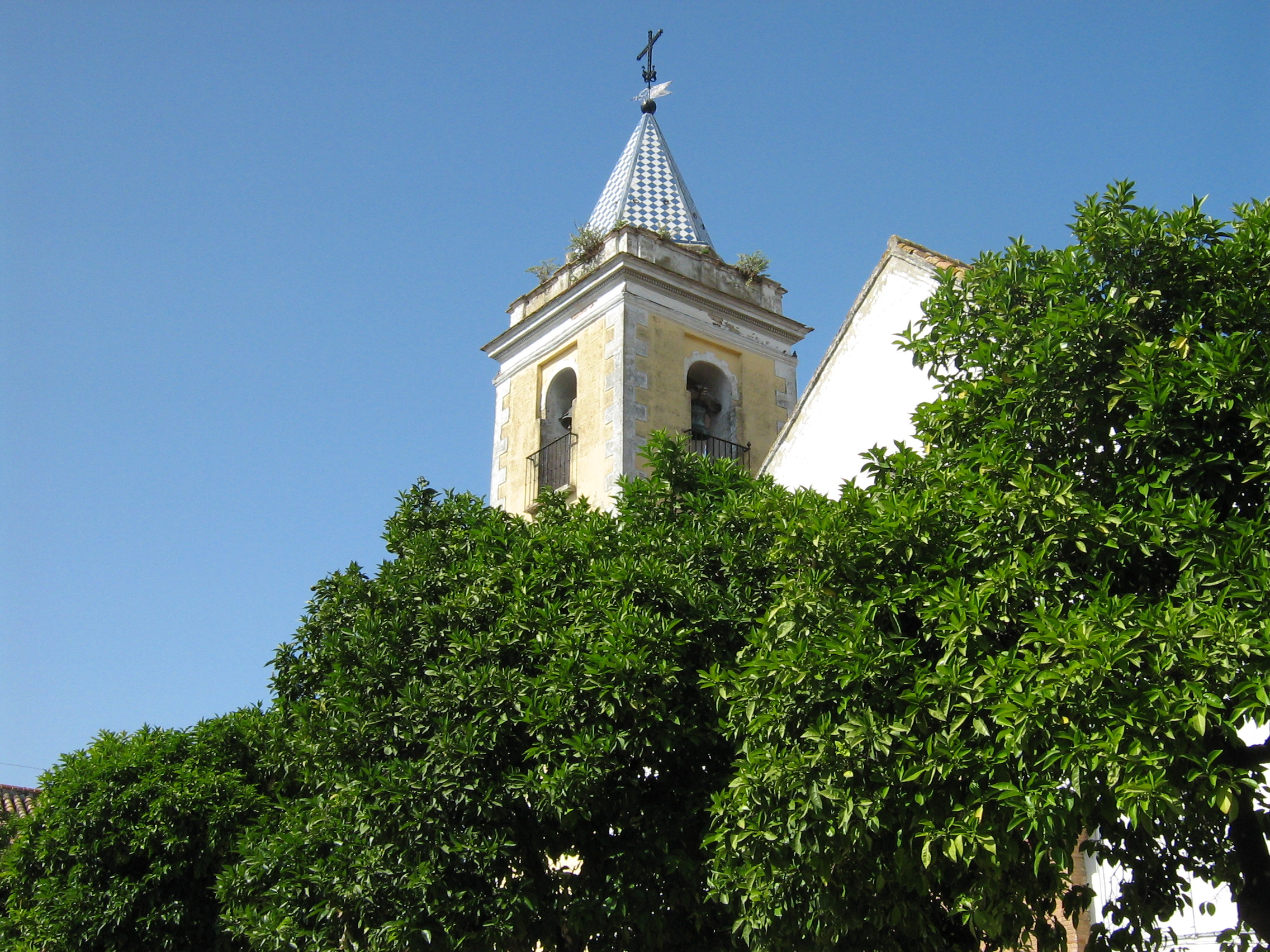
Virgen de las Nieves church

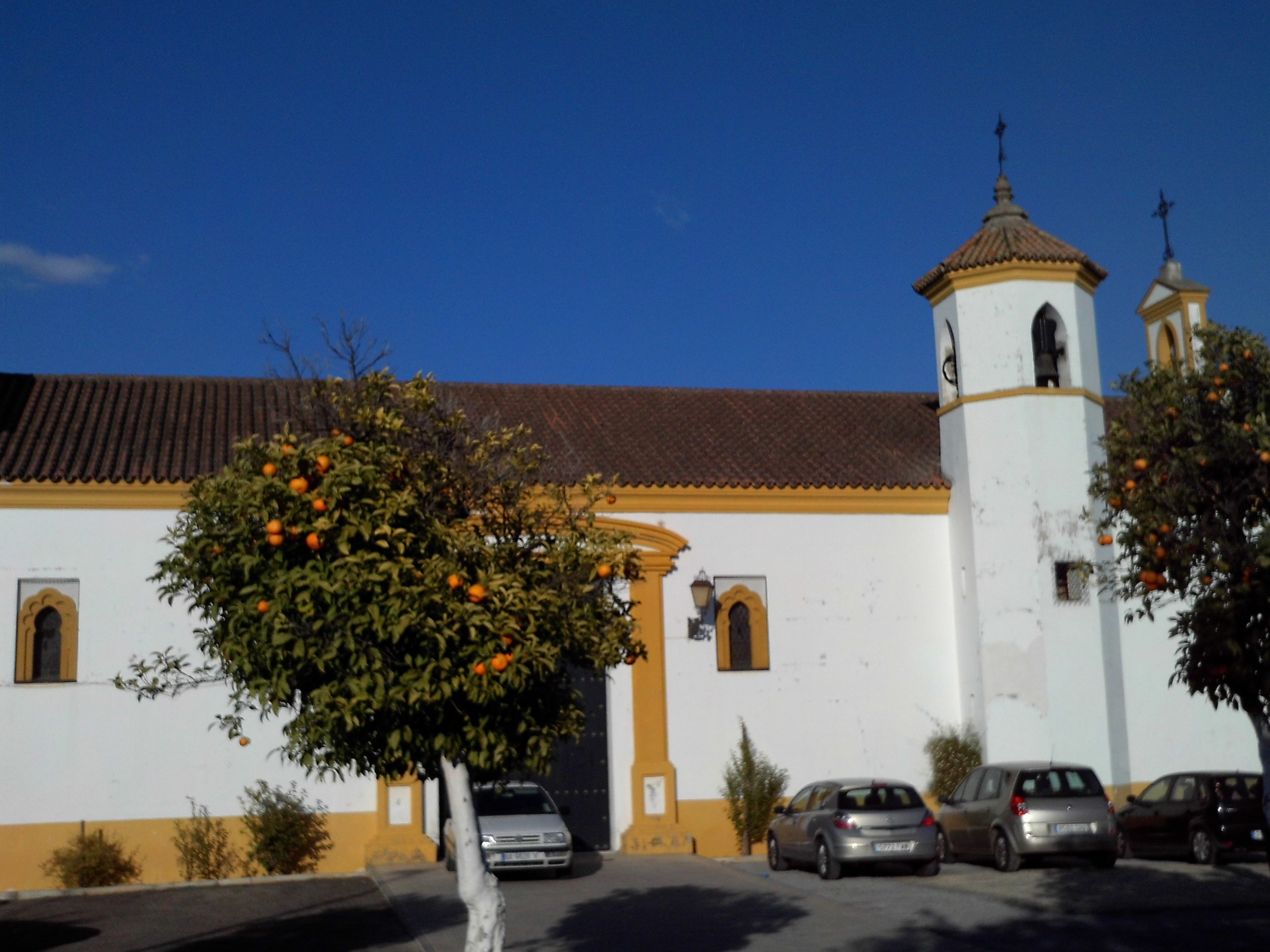
San José church

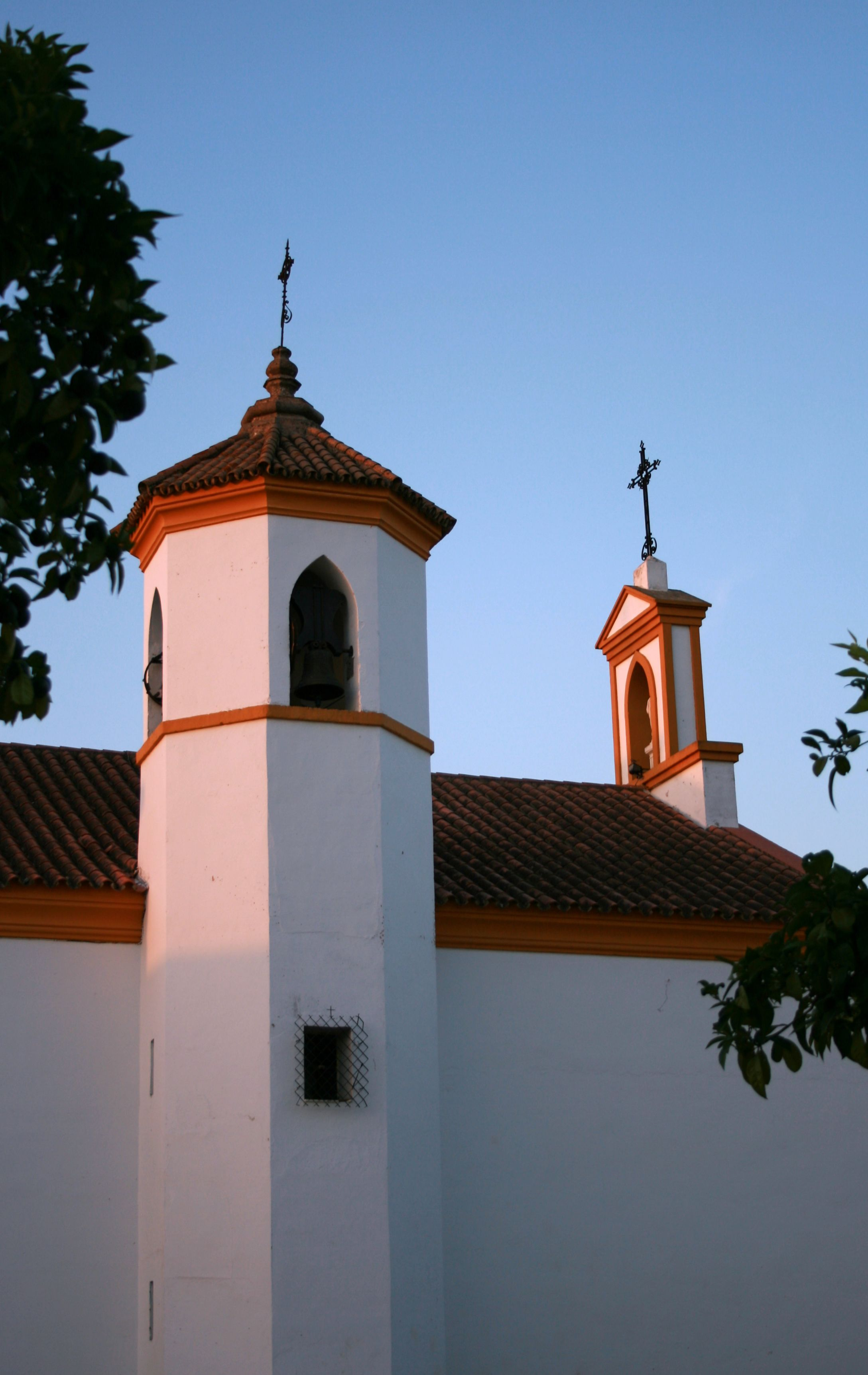
San José church

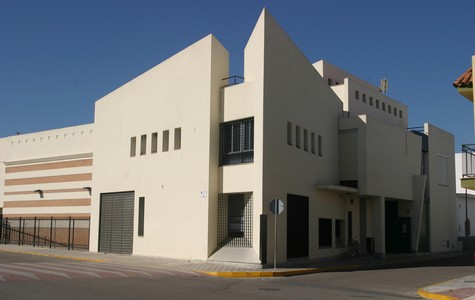
"Antonio Gala" cultural center of La Rinconada

== Plane crash ==
On 9 May 2015, an Airbus A400M Atlas military transport aircraft on a test flight crashed in the municipality, less than 5 kilometres (3.1 mi) from Seville Airport at around 1:00 pm local time, killing 4 of the 6 crew. The pilots had reported that the plane had a technical fault and asked for permission to land, but hit an electricity pylon while attempting an emergency landing. Tracking data from the Flightradar24 website indicated the plane had veered to the left before coming down and that it had reached a maximum altitude of 1,725 feet (526 m) before descending at a constant speed of about 160 knots (300 km/h; 180 mph).

== See also ==
- List of municipalities in Seville
