= Noor Azwan Noorlan =

Malaysian para-badminton player

Personal information
- Born: 23 August 1992 (age 34) Johor, Malaysia

Sport
- Country: Malaysia
- Sport: Badminton
- Handedness: Right

Men's singles WH2 Men's doubles WH1–WH2
- Highest ranking: 7 (MS 24 August 2022); 1 (MD with Muhammad Ikhwan Ramli 7 November 2022)
- Current ranking: 12 (MS); 4 (MD with Noor Azwan Noorlan) (3 September 2024)
Medal record
Men's Para-badminton
Representing Malaysia
World Championships
Silver medal – second place	2022 Tokyo	Men's doubles
Silver medal – second place	2024 Pattaya	Men's doubles
ASEAN Para Games
Gold medal – first place	2022 Surakarta	Men's doubles
Gold medal – first place	2023 Cambodia	Men's doubles
Bronze medal – third place	2022 Surakarta	Men's singles

Noor Azwan bin Noorlan (born 23 August 1992) is a Malaysian para badminton player. He is a two-time medalist in the men's doubles WH1–WH2 event at the BWF Para-Badminton World Championships.

He competed in the men's doubles WH1–WH2 event at the 2024 Summer Paralympics with his partner, Muhammad Ikhwan Ramli. The two did not advance to the knockout stages.

== Achievements ==
=== World Championships ===
Men's doubles WH1–WH2
Year	Venue	Partner	Opponent	Score	Result
2022	Yoyogi National Gymnasium; Tokyo, Japan	(Malaysia) Muhammad Ikhwan Ramli	(Germany) Rick Hellmann (Germany) Thomas Wandschneider	11–21, 15–21	Silver
2024	Pattaya Exhibition and Convention Hall, Pattaya, Thailand	(Malaysia) Muhammad Ikhwan Ramli	(China) Mai Jianpeng (China) Qu Zimo	10–21, 13–21	Silver

=== ASEAN Para Games ===
Men's singles WH1
Year	Venue	Opponent	Score	Result
2022	Edutorium Muhammadiyah University of Surakarta; Surakarta, Indonesia	(Indonesia) Agus Budi Utomo	21–9, 12–21, 18–21	Bronze

Men's doubles WH1–WH2
Year	Venue	Partner	Opponent	Score	Result
2022	Edutorium Muhammadiyah University of Surakarta; Surakarta, Indonesia	(Malaysia) Muhammad Ikhwan Ramli	(Indonesia) Supriadi (Indonesia) Agung Widodo	19–21, 21–10, 21–18	Gold
2023	Morodok Techo Badminton Hall; Phnom Penh, Cambodia	(Malaysia) Muhammad Ikhwan Ramli	(Thailand) Jakarin Homhual (Thailand) Dumnern Junthong	14–21, 21–17, 21–9	Gold

=== BWF Para Badminton World Circuit (1 title, 5 runners-up) ===
The BWF Para Badminton World Circuit – Grade 2, Level 1, 2 and 3 tournaments has been sanctioned by the Badminton World Federation from 2022.

Men's singles WH1
Year	Tournament	Level	Opponent	Score	Result
2022	Spanish Para Badminton International II	Level 2	(Switzerland) Luca Olgiati	21–11, 18–21, 13–21	(silver) Runner-up

Men's doubles WH1–WH2
Year	Tournament	Level	Partner	Opponent	Score	Result
2022	Spanish Para Badminton International II	Level 2	(Malaysia) Muhammad Ikhwan Ramli	(Germany) Rick Hellmann (Germany) Thomas Wandschneider	14–21, 14–21	(silver) Runner-up
2022	Spanish Para Badminton International I	Level 1	(Malaysia) Muhammad Ikhwan Ramli	(Japan) Daiki Kajiwara (Japan) Keita Nishimura	22–20, 19–21, 12–21	(silver) Runner-up
2022	Dubai Para Badminton International	Level 2	(Malaysia) Muhammad Ikhwan Ramli	(South Korea) Choi Jung-man (South Korea) Kim Jung-jun	13–21, 12–21	(silver) Runner-up
2022	4 Nations Para Badminton International	Level 1	(Malaysia) Muhammad Ikhwan Ramli	(Germany) Rick Hellmann (Germany) Thomas Wandschneider	20–22, 21–17, 21–11	(gold) Winner
2023	Western Australia Para Badminton International	Level 2	(Malaysia) Muhammad Ikhwan Ramli	(South Korea) Kim Jung-jun (South Korea) Ryu Dong-hyun	14–21, 16–21	(silver) Runner-up

=== International tournaments (from 2011–2021) (1 title) ===
Men's singles WH2
Year	Tournament	Opponent	Score	Result
2021	Dubai Para Badminton International	(Germany) Rick Hellmann	18–21, 21–18, 21–12	(gold) Winner
