= Turkey at the Paralympics =

- IPC code: TUR
- NPC: Turkish Paralympic Committee
- Website: www.tmpk.org.tr (in Turkish)
- Medals Ranked 58th: Gold 14 Silver 20 Bronze 32 Total 66

Summer appearances
- 1992; 1996; 2000; 2004; 2008; 2012; 2016; 2020; 2024

Winter appearances
- 2014; 2018; 2022–2026

Turkey first participated at the Paralympic Games of 1992 in Barcelona. Turkey did not participate in the 1996 Atlanta Paralylimpics, but since then has sent athletes to compete in every Summer Paralympic Games. The country debuted at the Winter Paralympics in 2014 in Sochi.

== Medals ==
=== Medals by Summer Games ===
Games	Athletes	Gold	Silver	Bronze	Total	Rank
(Italy) Rome 1960	did not participate					
(Japan) Tokyo 1964	did not participate					
(Israel) Tel Aviv 1968	did not participate					
(West Germany) Heidelberg 1972	did not participate					
(Canada) Toronto 1976	did not participate					
(Netherlands) Arnhem 1980	did not participate					
(United States) New York 1984	did not participate					
(South Korea) Seoul 1988	did not participate					
(Spain) Barcelona 1992	1	0	0	0	0	-
(United States) Atlanta 1996	did not participate					
(Australia) Sydney 2000	1	0	0	0	0	-
(Greece) Athens 2004	8	1	0	1	2	53
(China) Beijing 2008	16	1	0	1	2	50
(United Kingdom) London 2012	69	1	5	4	10	43
(Brazil) Rio de Janeiro 2016	81	3	1	5	9	34
(Japan) Tokyo 2020	87	2	4	9	15	42
(France) Paris 2024	94	6	10	12	28	23
Total (8/17)	357	14	20	32	66	57

=== Medals by Winter Games ===
Games	Athletes	Gold	Silver	Bronze	Total	Rank
(Sweden) Örnsköldsvik 1976	did not participate					
(Norway) Geilo 1980	did not participate					
(Austria) Innsbruck 1984	did not participate					
(Austria) Innsbruck 1988	did not participate					
(France) Albertville 1992	did not participate					
(Norway) Lillehammer 1994	did not participate					
(Japan) Nagano 1998	did not participate					
(United States) Salt Lake City 2002	did not participate					
(Italy) Turin 2006	did not participate					
(Canada) Vancouver 2010	did not participate					
(Russia) 2014 Sochi	2	0	0	0	0	—
(South Korea) 2018 Pyeongchang	1	0	0	0	0	—
(China) Beijing 2022	did not participate					
(Italy) Milano Cortina 2026	did not participate					
Total (2/14)	3	0	0	0	0	−

=== Medals by Summer Sport ===
Games	Gold	Silver	Bronze	Total
Goalball	3	0	1	4
Table tennis	2	4	8	14
Powerlifting	2	3	4	9
Archery	2	3	2	7
Swimming	2	0	2	4
Taekwondo	1	4	2	7
Shooting	1	3	2	6
Judo	1	1	8	10
Athletics	0	2	2	4
Wheelchair fencing	0	0	1	1
Total	14	20	32	66

=== Medals by Winter Sport ===
Games	Gold	Silver	Bronze	Total
Total	0	0	0	0

== Medalists ==
Medal	Name	Games	Sport	Event
Gold	Muharrem Korhan Yamaç	(Greece) 2004 Athens	Shooting	Mixed 25m pistol SH1
Bronze	Muharrem Korhan Yamaç	(Greece) 2004 Athens	Shooting	Mixed 50m pistol SH1
Gold	Gizem Girişmen	(China) 2008 Beijing	Archery	Women's individual recurve
Bronze	Neslihan Kavas	(China) 2008 Beijing	Table tennis	Women's singles class 9
Gold	Nazmiye Muslu	(United Kingdom) 2012 London	Powerlifting	Women's 40 kg
Silver	Çiğdem Dede	(United Kingdom) 2012 London	Powerlifting	Women's 44 kg
Silver	Muharrem Korhan Yamaç	(United Kingdom) 2012 London	Shooting	Men's 10m air pistol SH1
Silver	Nazan Akın	(United Kingdom) 2012 London	Judo	Women's +70 kg
Silver	Neslihan Kavas	(United Kingdom) 2012 London	Table tennis	Women's singles class 9
Silver	Ümran Ertiş; Neslihan Kavas; Kübra Öçsoy	(United Kingdom) 2012 London	Table tennis	Women's team class 6-10
Bronze	Doğan Hancı	(United Kingdom) 2012 London	Archery	Men's individual compound
Bronze	Men's goalball team: Abdullah Aydoğdu Hüseyin Alkan Mehmet Cesur Tekin Okan Düzgün Tuncay Karakaya Yusuf Uçar]	(United Kingdom) 2012 London	Goalball	Men's tournament
Bronze	Duygu Çete	(United Kingdom) 2012 London	Judo	Women's 57 kg
Bronze	Özlem Becerikli	(United Kingdom) 2012 London	Powerlifting	Women's 56 kg
Gold	Nazmiye Muratlı	(Brazil) 2016 Rio de Janeiro	Powerlifting	Women's 41 kg
Gold	Abdullah Öztürk	(Brazil) 2016 Rio de Janeiro	Table tennis	Men's singles class 4
Gold	Women's goalball team: Sevda Altunoluk Buket Atalay Gülşah Düzgün Neşe Mercan Sümeyye Özcan Seda Yıldız	(Brazil) 2016 Rio de Janeiro	Goalball	Women's tournament
Silver	Kübra Korkut	(Brazil) 2016 Rio de Janeiro	Table tennis	Women's singles class 7
Bronze	Ecem Taşın	(Brazil) 2016 Rio de Janeiro	Judo	Women's 48 kg
Bronze	Ayşegül Pehlivanlar	(Brazil) 2016 Rio de Janeiro	Shooting	Women's 10m air pistol SH1
Bronze	Mesme Taşbağ	(Brazil) 2016 Rio de Janeiro	Judo	Women's 70 kg
Bronze	Semih Deniz	(Brazil) 2016 Rio de Janeiro	Athletics	Men's 1500m T11
Bronze	Abdullah Öztürk; Ali Öztürk; Nesim Turan	(Brazil) 2016 Rio de Janeiro	Table tennis	Men's team class 4-5
Gold	Abdullah Öztürk	(Japan) 2020 Tokyo	Table tennis	Men's individual – Class 4
Gold	Women's goalball team: Fatma Gül Güler Reyhan Yılmaz Sevda Altınoluk Şeydanur Kaplan Kader Çelik Sevtap Altunoluk	(Japan) 2020 Tokyo	Goalball	Women's tournament
Silver	Bülent Korkmaz; Öznur Cüre	(Japan) 2020 Tokyo	Archery	Team compound open
Silver	Nihat Türkmenoğlu	(Japan) 2020 Tokyo	Archery	Men's individual W1
Silver	Ayşegül Pehlivanlar	(Japan) 2020 Tokyo	Shooting	Women's P2 10 metre air pistol SH1
Silver	Meryem Çavdar	(Japan) 2020 Tokyo	Taekwondo	Women's 49 kg
Bronze	Recep Çiftçi	(Japan) 2020 Tokyo	Judo	Men's 60 kg
Bronze	Besra Duman	(Japan) 2020 Tokyo	Powerlifting	Women's 55 kg
Bronze	Nesim Turan	(Japan) 2020 Tokyo	Table tennis	Men's individual class 4
Bronze	Ali Öztürk	(Japan) 2020 Tokyo	Table tennis	Men's individual class 5
Bronze	Kübra Korkut	(Japan) 2020 Tokyo	Table tennis	Women's individual class 7
Bronze	Zeynep Çelik	(Japan) 2020 Tokyo	Judo	Women's 57 kg
Bronze	Sevilay Öztürk	(Japan) 2020 Tokyo	Swimming	Women's 50 metre backstroke S5
Bronze	Bahattin Hekimoğlu	(Japan) 2020 Tokyo	Archery	Men's Individual W1
Bronze	Mahmut Bozteke	(Japan) 2020 Tokyo	Taekwondo	Men's 61 kg
Gold	Mahmut Bozteke	(France) 2024 Paris	Taekwondo	Men's 63 kg
Gold	Öznur Cüre	(France) 2024 Paris	Archery	Women's individual compound open
Gold	Women's goalball team: Fatma Gül Güler Reyhan Yılmaz Sevda Altınoluk Şeydanur Kaplan Berfin Altan Sevtap Altunoluk	(France) 2024 Paris	Goalball	Women's tournament
Gold	Umut Ünlü	(France) 2024 Paris	Swimming	Men's 50 m freestyle S3
Gold	İbrahim Bölükbaşı	(France) 2024 Paris	Judo	Men's +90 kg J2
Gold	Umut Ünlü	(France) 2024 Paris	Swimming	Men's 200 m freestyle S3
Silver	Ali Can Özcan	(France) 2024 Paris	Taekwondo	Men's 58 kg
Silver	Gamze Gürdal	(France) 2024 Paris	Taekwondo	Women's 57 kg
Silver	Fatih Çelik	(France) 2024 Paris	Taekwondo	Men's 70 kg
Silver	Aysel Özgan	(France) 2024 Paris	Shooting	Women's 10 metre air pistol SH1
Silver	Mohammad Khalvandi	(France) 2024 Paris	Athletics	Men's javelin throw
Silver	Aysel Önder	(France) 2024 Paris	Athletics	Women's 400 m T20
Silver	Abdullah Kayapınar	(France) 2024 Paris	Powerlifting	Men's −49 kg
Silver	Besra Duman	(France) 2024 Paris	Powerlifting	Women's −55 kg
Silver	Sadık Savaş; Merve Nur Eroğlu	(France) 2024 Paris	Archery	Mixed Team Recurve
Silver	Kübra Korkut	(France) 2024 Paris	Table tennis	Women's Individual C7
Bronze	Meryem Betül Çavdar	(France) 2024 Paris	Taekwondo	Women's 52 kg
Bronze	Abdullah Öztürk; Nesim Turan	(France) 2024 Paris	Table tennis	Men's doubles MD8
Bronze	Ali Öztürk	(France) 2024 Paris	Table tennis	Men's Individual C5
Bronze	Nazmiye Muratlı	(France) 2024 Paris	Powerlifting	Women's −45 kg
Bronze	Ebru Acer	(France) 2024 Paris	Table tennis	Women's Individual C11
Bronze	Ecem Taşın Çavdar	(France) 2024 Paris	Judo	Women's 48 kg J1
Bronze	Cahide Eke	(France) 2024 Paris	Judo	Women's 48 kg J2
Bronze	Sevilay Öztürk	(France) 2024 Paris	Swimming	Women's 50 m butterfly S5
Bronze	Hakan Akkaya	(France) 2024 Paris	Wheelchair fencing	Men's épée Category A
Bronze	Fatma Damla Altın	(France) 2024 Paris	Athletics	Women's Long Jump T20
Bronze	Sibel Çam	(France) 2024 Paris	Powerlifting	Women's −73 kg
Bronze	Nazan Akın Güneş	(France) 2024 Paris	Judo	Women's +70 kg J1

=== Multiple medalists ===
This is a list of Turkish athletes who have won multiple medals.

No.	Athlete	Sport	Years	Gender	Gold	Silver	Bronze	Total
1	Sevda Altunoluk	Goalball	2016–2024	F	3	0	0	3
2	Abdullah Öztürk	Table tennis	2012–2024	M	2	0	2	4
3	Nazmiye Muratlı	Powerlifting	2008–2024	F	2	0	1	3
4	Umut Ünlü	Swimming	2024–2024	M	2	0	0	2
4	Fatma Gül Güler	Goalball	2020–2024	F	2	0	0	2
4	Reyhan Yılmaz	Goalball	2020–2024	F	2	0	0	2
4	Şeydanur Kaplan	Goalball	2020–2024	F	2	0	0	2
4	Sevtap Altunoluk	Goalball	2020–2024	F	2	0	0	2
9	Muharrem Korhan Yamaç	Shooting	2004–2012	M	1	1	1	3
10	Öznur Cüre	Archery	2020–2024	F	1	1	0	2
11	Mahmut Bozteke	Taekwondo	2020–2024	M	1	0	1	2
12	Kübra Korkut	Table tennis	2012–2024	F	0	3	1	4
13	Neslihan Kavas	Table tennis	2008–2012	F	0	2	1	3
14	Meryem Betül Çavdar	Taekwondo	2020–2024	F	0	1	1	2
14	Besra Duman	Powerlifting	2020–2024	F	0	1	1	2
14	Ayşegül Pehlivanlar	Shooting	2016–2020	F	0	1	1	2
17	Nesim Turan	Table tennis	2016–2024	M	0	0	3	3
17	Ali Öztürk	Table tennis	2016–2024	M	0	0	3	3
19	Sevilay Öztürk	Swimming	2020–2024	F	0	0	2	2
19	Ecem Taşın	Judo	2016–2024	F	0	0	2	2

=== Disqualified Medalists ===
Medal	Name	Sport	Event	Date
Gold	Serkan Yıldırım	Athletics	Men's 100 metres T12	31 August 2024

== Sport by year ==
Sport	92	00	04	08	12	16	20	24	Years
Archery				5	11	8	11	9	5
Athletics			1	1	5	10	9	16	6
Badminton							2	2	2
Football 5-a-side					10	10		10	3
Goalball					6	12	12	6	4
Judo				1	6	4	5	10	5
Powerlifting			2	3	6	3	5	5	6
Rowing								2	1
Shooting			2	4	5	9	9	8	6
Swimming	1	1	2		2	3	5	6	7
Table tennis			1	1	6	9	9	8	6
Taekwondo							6	8	2
Triathlon								1	1
Wheelchair basketball					12	12	12		3
Wheelchair tennis				1			1	2	3
Total	1	1	8	16	69	80	87	94	8

== See also ==
- Turkey at the Olympics
