= Turkey at the 2020 Summer Paralympics =

- Flag of Turkey
- IPC code: TUR
- NPC: Turkish Paralympic Committee

in Tokyo, Japan August 24, 2021 – September 5, 2021
- Competitors: 87 in 13 sports
- Flag bearers: Havva Elmalı, Mucahit Günaydın
- Medals: Gold 2 Silver 4 Bronze 9 Total 15

Summer Paralympics appearances (overview)
- 1992; 1996; 2000; 2004; 2008; 2012; 2016; 2020; 2024

Turkey competed at the 2020 Summer Paralympics in Tokyo, Japan from 24 August to 5 September 2021. This was the country's seventh appearance in the past eight Games despite their absence in the 1996 Summer Paralympics.

== Medalists ==
Medal	Name	Sport	Event	Date
Gold	Abdullah Öztürk	Table tennis	Men's individual – Class 4	30 August
Gold	Turkey women's national goalball team: Fatma Gül Güler; Reyhan Yılmaz; Sevda Altınoluk; Şeydanur Kaplan; Kader Çelik; Sevtap Altunoluk	Goalball	Women's tournament	3 September
Silver	Bülent Korkmaz; Öznur Cüre	Archery	Team compound open	29 August
Silver	Nihat Türkmenoğlu	Archery	Men's individual W1	30 August
Silver	Ayşegül Pehlivanlar	Shooting	Women's P2 10 metre air pistol SH1	31 August
Silver	Meryem Çavdar	Taekwondo	Women's 49 kg	2 September
Bronze	Recep Çiftçi	Judo	Men's 60 kg	27 August
Bronze	Besra Duman	Powerlifting	Women's 55 kg	27 August
Bronze	Nesim Turan	Table tennis	Men's individual class 4	28 August
Bronze	Ali Öztürk	Table tennis	Men's individual class 5	28 August
Bronze	Kübra Korkut	Table tennis	Women's individual class 7	28 August
Bronze	Zeynep Çelik	Judo	Women's 57 kg	28 August
Bronze	Sevilay Öztürk	Swimming	Women's 50 metre backstroke S5	30 August
Bronze	Bahattin Hekimoğlu	Archery	Men's Individual W1	30 August
Bronze	Mahmut Bozteke	Taekwondo	Men's 61 kg	2 September

Medals by sport
Sport	1st place, gold medalist(s)	2nd place, silver medalist(s)	3rd place, bronze medalist(s)	Total
Table tennis	1	0	3	4
Goalball	1	0	0	1
Archery	0	2	1	3
Taekwondo	0	1	1	2
Shooting	0	1	0	1
Judo	0	0	2	2
Powerlifting	0	0	1	1
Swimming	0	0	1	1
Total	2	4	9	15

== Competitors ==
#	Sport	Men	Women	Total	Events
1	Archery	6	5	11	14
2	Athletics	2	7	9	13
3	Badminton	0	2	2	2
4	Basketball	12	0	12	1
5	Fencing	1	0	1	2
6	Goalball	6	6	12	2
7	Judo	1	4	5	5
8	Powerlifting	1	4	5	5
9	Shooting	5	4	9	19
10	Swimming	2	3	5	18
11	Table Tennis	4	5	9	12
12	Taekwondo	3	3	6	6
13	Tennis	0	1	1	1
Total		43	44	87	100

== Archery ==
Turkey have secured eleven quotas in archery.

Athlete	Event	Ranking round		Round of 32	Round of 16	Quarterfinals	Semifinals	Finals	
Athlete	Event	Score	Seed	Opposition score	Opposition score	Opposition score	Opposition score	Opposition score	Rank
Nihat Türkmenoğlu	Men's individual W1	661	1	—N/a		Oyama (JPN); W 133–129	Hekimoğlu (TUR); W 139–132	Drahonínský (CZE); L 141–142	2nd place, silver medalist(s)
Bahattin Hekimoğlu	Men's individual W1	643	5	—N/a	Leonov (RPC); W 135–107	Gáspár (HUN); W 138–135	Türkmenoğlu (TUR); L 132–139	Zandi (IRI); W 139–134	3rd place, bronze medalist(s)
Bülent Korkmaz	Men's individual compound open	689	10	Lelou (FRA); W 141–137	Shigaev (RPC); L 145–146	did not advance			
Murat Turan	Men's individual compound open	675	24	Atamanenko (UKR); W 139–139	Shelby (USA); W 142–138	He (CHN); L 145–148	did not advance		
Sadık Savaş	Men's individual recurve open	611	9	Ciszek (POL); W 6–4	Aksoy (TUR); W 6–4	Mather (USA); L 2–6	did not advance		
Vedat Aksoy	Men's individual recurve open	583	25	Ziapaev (RPC); W 6–2	Savaş (TUR); L 4–6	did not advance			
Fatma Danabaş	Women's individual W1	515	12	—N/a	Coryell (USA); L 115–126	did not advance			
Öznur Cüre	Women's individual compound open	689	3	—N/a	Zúñiga (CHI); L 140–143	did not advance			
Sevgi Yorulmaz	Women's individual compound open	679	10	Homjanthuek (THA); W 133-133	Alim (SGP); W 140–136	Artakhinova (RPC); L 129–139	did not advance		
Yağmur Şengül	Women's individual recurve open	557	15	Torun (TUR); L 4–6	did not advance				
Zehra Özbey Torun	Women's individual recurve open	554	18	Şengül (TUR); W 6–4	Mijno (ITA); L 0–6	did not advance			
Nihat Türkmenoğlu; Fatma Danabaş	Mixed team W1	—N/a				South Korea; L 114–133	did not advance		
Bülent Korkmaz; Öznur Cüre	Mixed team compound	—N/a				India; W 153–151	RPC; W 156–155	China; L 152–153	2nd place, silver medalist(s)
Yağmur Şengül; Sadık Savaş	Mixed team recurve	—N/a			Great Britain; L 1–5	did not advance			

== Athletics ==
9 athlete in 13 events are representing Turkey at the 2020 Summer Paralympics.

Track events

Athlete	Event	Heats		Final	
Athlete	Event	Result	Rank	Result	Rank
Oğuz Akbulut	Men's 400m T12	49.17	2	Did not advance	
Hakan Cira	Men's 400m T13	50.23	4 q	50.05	6
Hamide Dogangun	Women's 100m T53	—N/a		16.94	5
Hamide Dogangun	Women's 400m T53	56.68	3 Q	58.67	6
Hamide Dogangun	Women's 800m T53	1:51.05	1 Q, SB	1:48.94	5
Zübeyde Süpürgeci	Women's 100m T54	16.63	3 Q, SB	16.86	7
Zübeyde Süpürgeci	Women's 400m T54	59.39	7	Did not advance	
Zübeyde Süpürgeci	Women's 800m T54	1:54.11	3 Q, PB	1:54.87	8
Havva Elmalı	Women's 1500m T11	5:38.98	4	Did not advance	

Field events

Athlete	Event	Final	
Athlete	Event	Result	Rank
Mihriban Korkmaz	Women's shot put F20	12.19	9
Büşra Nur Tırıklı	Women's discus throw F11	32.70	6
Fatma Damla Altın	Women's long jump T20	5.06	7
Esra Bayrak	Women's long jump T20	5.37	4

== Badminton ==
Women

Athlete	Event	Group stage			Quarterfinal	Semifinal	Final / BM	
Athlete	Event	Opposition Score	Opposition Score	Rank	Opposition Score	Opposition Score	Opposition Score	Rank
Emine Seçkin	Singles WH2	Lee (KOR); W (12–21, 21–9, 21–16)	Yamazaki (JPN); W (21–15, 13–21, 21–16)	1 Q	Wetwithan (THA); W (21–10, 21–15)	Liu (CHN); L (7–21, 4–21)	Yamazaki (JPN); L (16–21, 8–21)	4
Zehra Bağlar	Singles SU5	Kohli (IND); L (12–21, 18–21)	Suzuki (JPN); L (12–21, 8–21)	3	did not advance			

== Goalball ==
=== Men ===
The following is the Turkey roster in the men's goalball tournament of the 2020 Summer Paralympics.

No.	Player	Class	Date of birth (age)
1	Hüseyin Alkan	B1	1 April 1988 (aged 33)
3	Ebubekir Sıddık Kara	B2	13 July 1995 (aged 26)
4	Ekrem Gündoğdu	B1	26 October 1990 (aged 30)
6	Tekin Okan Düzgün	B1	24 May 1988 (aged 33)
7	Tuncay Karakaya	B1	1 October 1989 (aged 31)
8	Abdullah Aydoğdu	B3	27 September 1991 (aged 29)

Group stage

Pos	Team	Pld	W	D	L	GF	GA	GD	Pts	Qualification
1	Belgium	4	2	0	2	18	13	+5	6	Quarter-finals
2	Ukraine	4	2	0	2	18	15	+3	6	Quarter-finals
3	Turkey	4	2	0	2	15	15	0	6	Quarter-finals
4	China	4	2	0	2	21	22	−1	6	Quarter-finals
5	Germany	4	2	0	2	16	23	−7	6	

Source: TOCOG

25 August 2021; 17:30	Germany	6–4	Turkey	Makuhari Messe, Tokyo; Referees: Romualdas Vaitiekus (Lithuania), Reza Dehghan (Iran)
25 August 2021; 17:30	Dennis 4 Hörauf 1 Steiger 1	Report	Karakaya 3 Gündoğdu 1	Makuhari Messe, Tokyo; Referees: Romualdas Vaitiekus (Lithuania), Reza Dehghan (Iran)

27 August 2021; 09:00	Turkey	4–6	Belgium	Makuhari Messe, Tokyo; Referees: Yoshinori Nii (Japan), Robert Avery (Great Britain)
27 August 2021; 09:00	Karakaya 3 Gündoğdu 1	Report	B. Vanhove 3 Mapreni 2 T. Vanhove 1	Makuhari Messe, Tokyo; Referees: Yoshinori Nii (Japan), Robert Avery (Great Britain)

28 August 2021; 10:30	Turkey	6–3	China	Makuhari Messe, Tokyo; Referees: Svitlana Moroz (Ukraine), Yoshinori Nii (Japan)
28 August 2021; 10:30	Kara 3 Karakaya 3	Report	Yang Mingyuan 2 Cai Changgui 1	Makuhari Messe, Tokyo; Referees: Svitlana Moroz (Ukraine), Yoshinori Nii (Japan)

30 August 2021; 09:00	Ukraine	0–1	Turkey	Makuhari Messe, Tokyo; Referees: Warrick Jackes (Australia), Yoshinori Nii (Japan)
30 August 2021; 09:00		Report	Karakaya 1	Makuhari Messe, Tokyo; Referees: Warrick Jackes (Australia), Yoshinori Nii (Japan)

Quarterfinal

31 August 2021; 19:30	Brazil	9–4	Turkey	Makuhari Messe, Tokyo; Referees: Yoshinori Nii (Japan), Romualdas Vaitiekus (Lithuania)
31 August 2021; 19:30	Moreno 6 Sousa 3	Report	Gündoğdu 4	Makuhari Messe, Tokyo; Referees: Yoshinori Nii (Japan), Romualdas Vaitiekus (Lithuania)

=== Women ===
The following is the Turkey roster in the women's goalball tournament of the 2020 Summer Paralympics.

No.	Player	Class	Date of birth (age)
1	Fatma Gül Güler	B2	12 February 2004 (aged 17)
2	Reyhan Yılmaz	B2	18 November 2001 (aged 19)
3	Sevda Altunoluk	B2	1 April 1994 (aged 27)
4	Şeydanur Kaplan	B2	23 March 2000 (aged 21)
6	Kader Çelik	B2	1 January 2001 (aged 20)
7	Sevtap Altunoluk	B2	10 January 1995 (aged 26)

Group stage

Pos	Team	Pld	W	D	L	GF	GA	GD	Pts	Qualification
1	Turkey	4	3	0	1	30	11	+19	9	Quarterfinals
2	United States	4	3	0	1	22	10	+12	9	Quarterfinals
3	Japan (H)	4	2	1	1	18	13	+5	7	Quarterfinals
4	Brazil	4	1	1	2	23	19	+4	4	Quarterfinals
5	Egypt	4	0	0	4	3	43	−40	0	

Source: TOCOG
Rules for classification: 1) points; 2) goal difference; 3) number of wins; 4) goals against; 5) head-to-head goal difference.
(H) Hosts
25 August 2021
14:45

Turkey	7–1	Japan
Sevd. Altunoluk 3', 11', 17', 21'; Güler 5', 20'; Yilmaz 21'	Report	Hagiwara 5'

Makuhari Messe, Tokyo
Referee: Svitlana Moroz (Ukraine), Raquel Aguado Gómez (Spain)

26 August 2021; 14:45	Egypt	2–12	Turkey	Makuhari Messe, Tokyo; Referees: Raquel Gomez Aguado (Spain), Raili Sipura (Finland)
26 August 2021; 14:45	Elgabry 1 Ezzeldin 1	Report	Sevd. Altunoluk 8 Sevt. Altunoluk 2 Güler 1 Çelik 1	Makuhari Messe, Tokyo; Referees: Raquel Gomez Aguado (Spain), Raili Sipura (Finland)

28 August 2021
20:30

Turkey	8–4	Brazil
Sevd. Altunoluk 1', 1', 5', 16', 17', 23'; Güler 2', 3'	Report	Amorim 6', 10'; Custodio 13', 15'

Makuhari Messe, Tokyo
Referee: Svitlana Moroz (Ukraine), Raili Sipura (Finland)

30 August 2021
19:00

United States	4–3	Turkey
Mason 8'; Miller 11'; Dennis 13', 22'	Report	Sevd. Altunoluk 1', 4', 9'

Makuhari Messe, Tokyo
Referee: Raquel Aguado Gómez (Spain), Svitlana Moroz (Ukraine)

Quarterfinal

1 September 2021
13:15

Turkey	10–6	Australia
Sevd. Altunoluk 1', 3', 4', 6', 6', 9', 17', 17'; Güler 5'; Çelik 24'	Report	Horsburgh 2', 11', 20', 21', 24'; Smith 5'

Makuhari Messe, Tokyo
Referee: Woradet Kultawongwattana (Thailand), Launel Scott (Canada)

Semifinal

2 September 2021
15:00

Turkey	8–5	Japan
Sevd. Altunoluk 2', 3', 8', 10', 18', 18', 22', 23'	Report	Hagiwara 1', 1', 8', 18', 19'

Makuhari Messe, Tokyo
Referee: Raili Sipura (Finland), Romualdas Vaitiekus (Lithuania)

Final

3 September 2021
17:45

United States	2–9	Turkey
Mason 9'; Miller 22'	Report	Sevd. Altunoluk 1', 1', 5', 6', 6', 8', 18', 18', 20'

Makuhari Messe, Tokyo
Referee: Raquel Aguado Gómez (Spain), Svitlana Moroz (Ukraine)

== Judo ==
Athlete	Event	First round	Quarterfinal	Semifinal	First repechage	Repechage semi-final	Final	
Athlete	Event	Opposition Result	Opposition Result	Opposition Result	Opposition Result	Opposition Result	Opposition Result	Rank
Recep Çiftçi	Men's 60 kg	Borges (URU); W 010–001	Shirinli (AZE); L 000–010	Did not advance	—N/a	Hirai (JPN); W 010–000	Blanco (VEN); W 010–001	3rd place, bronze medalist(s)
Ecem Taşın	Women's 48 kg	Bye	Potapova (RPC); L 000–010	Did not advance	Brussig (GER); W 011–001	Hangai (JPN); L 001–010	Did not advance	7
Zeynep Çelik	Women's 57 kg	Bye	Ovchinnikova (RPC); W 010–000	Valiyeva (AZE); L 000–010	Bye		Hirose (JPN); W 010–001	3rd place, bronze medalist(s)
Duygu Çete	Women's 63 kg	Pozdnysheva (RPC); L 000–010	did not advance					
Raziye Uluçam	Women's 70 kg	Breskovic (CRO); W 010–000	Zabrodskaia (RPC); W 001–000	Maldonado (BRA); L 000–010	Bye		Ruvalcaba (MEX); L 000–010	5

== Powerlifting ==
Athlete	Event	Result	Rank
Abdullah Kayapınar	Men's 49 kg	150	5
Nazmiye Muslu Muratlı	Women's 45 kg	DNF	
Besra Duman	Women's 55 kg	124	3rd place, bronze medalist(s)
Yasemin Ceylan Baydar	Women's 61 kg	NM	
Sibel Çam	Women's 73 kg	NM	

== Shooting ==
9 Turkish shooters qualified in 19 events.

Athlete	Event	Qualification		Final		
Athlete	Event	Score	Rank	Score	Total	Rank
Savaş Üstün	Men's 10m air rifle standing SH1	599.4	19	Did not advance		
Muharrem Korhan Yamaç	Men's 10m air pistol standing SH1	550	20	Did not advance		
Murat Oğuz	Men's 10m air pistol standing SH1	554	18	Did not advance		
Suzan Çevik	Women's 10m air rifle standing SH1		17	Did not advance		
Çağla Baş	Women's 10m air rifle standing SH1		15	Did not advance		
Ayşegül Pehlivanlar	10 m air pistol standing SH1					2nd place, silver medalist(s)
Aysel Özgan	10 m air pistol standing SH1		8	Did not advance		
Hakan Çevik	10 m air rifle standing SH2		19	Did not advance		
Hakan Çevik	10 m air rifle prone SH2		26	Did not advance		
Çağla Baş	10 m air rifle prone SH1		26	Did not advance		
Savaş Üstün	10 m air rifle prone SH1		9	Did not advance		
Erhan Coşkuner	10 m air rifle prone SH1		7	Did not advance		
Muharrem Korhan Yamaç	25 metre pistol SH1		6	Did not advance		
Murat Oğuz	25 metre pistol SH1		12	Did not advance		
Murat Oğuz	50 m pistol SH1		18	Did not advance		
Aysel Özgan	50 m pistol SH1		22	Did not advance		
Ayşegül Pehlivanlar	50 m pistol SH1		17	Did not advance		
Erhan Coşkuner	50 m rifle prone SH1		39	Did not advance		
Savaş Üstün	50 m rifle prone SH1		33	Did not advance		

== Swimming ==
5 swimmer will represent Turkey in 18 events in swimming at the 2020 Summer Paralympics via the 2019 World Para Swimming Championships slot allocation method & MQS.

Athlete	Events	Heats		Final	
Athlete	Events	Time	Rank	Time	Rank
Koral Berkin Kutlu	Men's 50m freestyle S5	36.85	15	Did not advance	
Koral Berkin Kutlu	Men's 50m butterfly S5	38.99	10	Did not advance	
Koral Berkin Kutlu	Men's 100m freestyle S5	1:20.20	10	Did not advance	
Koral Berkin Kutlu	Men's 200m freestyle S5	2:46.37	5 Q	2:46.62	5
Beytullah Eroğlu	Men's 50m backstroke S5	41.99	11	Did not advance	
Beytullah Eroğlu	Men's 50m butterfly S5	39.93	12		
Sümeyye Boyacı	Women's 50m backstroke S5	43.28	2 Q	43.94	4
Sümeyye Boyacı	Women's 50m butterfly S5	49.12	9	Did not advance	
Sümeyye Boyacı	Women's 100m freestyle S5	1:39.41	14	Did not advance	
Sümeyye Boyacı	Women's 200m freestyle S5	3:15.75	7 Q	3:17.23	7
Sevilay Öztürk	Women's 50m backstroke S5	44.16	3 Q	43.48	3rd place, bronze medalist(s)
Sevilay Öztürk	Women's 50m butterfly S5	45.88	4 Q	45.81	5
Sevilay Öztürk	Women's 100m freestyle S5	1:42.73	15	Did not advance	
Sevilay Öztürk	Women's 200m freestyle S5	3:17.30	8 Q	3:29.05	8
Elif İldem	Women's 50m backstroke S2	1:32.86	8	1:32.49	8
Elif İldem	Women's 100m freestyle S3	3:17.54	15	Did not advance	
Elif İldem	Women's 100m backstroke S2	3:16.84	8 Q	3:13.39	8
Sümeyye Boyacı; Sevilay Öztürk; Koral Berkin Kutlu; Beytullah Eroğlu	Mixed 4x50m freestyle relay 20pts	2:44.80	8 Q	2:42.43	7

== Table tennis ==
Turkey entered nine athletes into the table tennis competition at the games. Abdullah Ozturk qualified from 2019 ITTF European Para Championships which was held in Helsingborg, Sweden and five others from World Ranking allocation.

Men

Athlete	Event	Group stage			Round of 16	Quarterfinals	Semifinals	Final	
Athlete	Event	Opposition Result	Opposition Result	Rank	Opposition Result	Opposition Result	Opposition Result	Opposition Result	Rank
Abdullah Öztürk	Individual C4	Astan (INA); W 3–1	Lis (POL); W 3–0	1 Q	Bye	Sayago (ESP); W 3–0	Thomas (FRA); W 3–1	Kim (KOR); W 3–1	1st place, gold medalist(s)
Nesim Turan	Individual C4	Gonzalez (CHI); W 3–0	Zhang Y (CHN); W 3–2	1 Q	Bye	Trávniček (SVK); W 3–0	Kim Y-g (KOR); L 1–3	Did not advance	3rd place, bronze medalist(s)
Ali Öztürk	Individual C5	Baus (GER); L 2–3	Zenaty (EGY); W 3–0	2 Q	—N/a	Palikuća (SRB); W 3–-1	Cao (CHN); L 0–3	Did not advance	3rd place, bronze medalist(s)
Hamza Çalışkan	Individual C5	Cao (CHN); L 0–3	Savant-Aira (FRA); L 2–3	3	Did not advance				
Abdullah Ozturk; Ali Ozturk; Nesim Turan	Class 4-5	—N/a				Slovakia (SVK); L 1–2	Did not advance		

Women

Athlete	Event	Group stage				Quarterfinals	Semifinals	Final / BM	
Athlete	Event	Opposition Result	Opposition Result	Opposition Result	Rank	Opposition Result	Opposition Result	Opposition Result	Rank
Hatice Duman	Individual C3	Xue J (CHN); L 0–3	Karić (CRO); L 1–3	—N/a	3	Did not advance			
Nergiz Altıntaş	Individual C3	Ahlquist (SWE); L 1–3	Asayut (THA); L 1–3	—N/a	3	Did not advance			
Kubra Korkut	Individual C7	Korneliussen (NOR); W 3–0	Safonova (RPC); W 3–1	—N/a	1 Q	Bye	van Zon (NED); L 1–3	Did not advance	3rd place, bronze medalist(s)
Neslihan Kavas	Individual C9	Xiong (CHN); L 1–3	Rauen (BRA); L 0–3	Szvitacs (HUN); L 0–3	3	Did not advance			
Merve Demir	Individual C10	Partyka (POL); L 1–3	Takeuchi (JPN); W 3–0	—N/a	2 Q	Tien (TPE); L 1–3	Did not advance		
Nergiz Altıntaş; Hatice Duman	Class 1–3	—N/a				Croatia (CRO); L 0–2	Did not advance		
Merve Demir; Neslihan Kavas; Kubra Korkut	Class 9–10	—N/a				Brazil (BRA); L 1–2	Did not advance		

== Taekwondo ==
Para taekwondo makes its debut appearance in the Paralympic programme, six Turkish taekwondo practitioners qualified to the 2020 Summer Paralympics via World Ranking.

Athlete	Event	First round	Quarterfinal	Semifinal	First repechage round	Repechage semi-final	Final / BM	
Athlete	Event	Opposition Result	Opposition Result	Opposition Result	Opposition Result	Opposition Result	Opposition Result	Rank
Mahmut Bozteke	Men's –61 kg	Bye	Sidorov (RPC); L 21–26	Did not advance	Hakizimana (RPT); W WWD	Bolor-Erdene (MGL); W 23–22	Bossolo (ITA); W 14–3	3rd place, bronze medalist(s)
Fatih Çelik	Men's –75 kg	Seye (SEN); W 38–19	Pourrahnama (IRI); L 21–37	Did not advance	Joo (KOR); L 40–31	Did not advance		
Mehmet Vasıf Yakut	Men's +75 kg	Bye	Ataev (RPC); L 8–30	Did not advance	Pedroza (MEX); L 2–23	Did not advance		
Meryem Betül Çavdar	Women's –49 kg	Bye	Phuangkitcha (THA); W 34–12	Poddubskaia (THA); W 22–11	—N/a		Espinoza (PER); L 21–34	2nd place, silver medalist(s)
Gamze Gürdal	Women's –58 kg	Bye	Munro (GBR); L 22–34	Did not advance	Bye	Abohegazy (EGY); W 17–15	Fernandes (BRA); L 9–26	5
Şeyma Nur Emeksiz Bacaksız	Women's +58 kg	Bye	Lypetska (UKR); L 10–22	Did not advance	Watson (AUS); L 2–36	Did not advance		

== Wheelchair basketball ==
The men's team qualified after entered top four at the 2019 IWBF Men's European Championship held in Wałbrzych, Poland.

Team roster

The following is the Turkey roster in the men's wheelchair basketball tournament of the 2020 Summer Paralympics.

Turkey men's national wheelchair basketball team - 2020 Summer Paralympics roster
Players
Coaches

No.	Name	Age – Date of birth	Pts.
3	Deniz Acar	45 – 9 January 1976	2.5
5	Ozgur Gurbulak	40 – 30 April 1981	4.0
6	Mucahit Gunaydin	22 – 25 March 1999	4.0
7	Ahmet Efeturk	25 – 31 August 1995	4.0
9	Ugur Toprak	29 – 19 July 1992	3.0
10	Ismail Ar	35 – 28 November 1985	1.5
11	Fikri Gundogdu	36 – 15 June 1985	1.0
15	Selim Sayak	35 – 26 January 1986	2.5
35	Ferit Gumus	40 – 10 January 1981	3.0
36	Samet Toptas	32 – 1 November 1988	4.5
47	Ridvan Aksoy	21 – 2 February 2000	1.0
52	Volkan Gulem	23 – 16 February 1998	2.0

Head coach

Ahmet Akin

Assistant coach(es)

Erdinc Kilic, Emrah Buken Ozgur

Legend

- Age - describes age on 24 August 2021

Group A

Pos	Team	Pld	W	L	PF	PA	PD	Pts	Qualification
1	Spain	5	5	0	375	272	+103	10	Quarter-finals
2	Japan (H)	5	4	1	312	298	+14	9	Quarter-finals
3	Turkey	5	3	2	353	327	+26	8	Quarter-finals
4	Canada	5	2	3	307	333	−26	7	Quarter-finals
5	South Korea	5	1	4	305	332	−27	6	9th/10th place playoff
6	Colombia	5	0	5	256	346	−90	5	11th/12th place playoff

Source: TOCOG
Rules for classification: 1) Points; 2) Head-to-head results; 3) Points difference; 4) Points scored.
(H) Hosts

26 August 2021
17:00

Report

South Korea	70–80	Turkey
Scoring by quarter: 15–21, 18–17, 15–19, 22–23
Pts: Cho 26; Rebs: Gim 11; Asts: Cho 8		Pts: Gürbulak 25; Rebs: Toprak 8 Asts: Gürbulak 13

Musashino Forest Sport Plaza
Attendance: 40
Referees: Tomas Pajer

27 August 2021
11:15

Report

Turkey	77–73 (OT)	Canada
Scoring by quarter: 20–13, 10–17, 15–24, 22–13, Overtime: 10–6
Pts: Gürbulak 28; Rebs: Gürbulak 8 Asts: Gürbulak 13		Pts: Goncin 33; Rebs: Anderson 22; Asts: Goncin 11

Musashino Forest Sport Plaza
Attendance: 180
Referees: Matias Quintana

28 August 2021
9:00

Report

Turkey	61–79	Spain
Scoring by quarter: 10–17, 16–21, 22–21, 13–20
Pts: Gürbulak 26; Rebs: Gümüş 5 Asts: Toprak 9		Pts: Ruiz 20; Rebs: Lorenzo 13; Asts: García 8

Ariake Arena
Referees: Darrell Hargreaves

29 August 2021
11:15

Report

Colombia	38–80	Turkey
Scoring by quarter: 8–15, 13–22, 7–27, 10–16
Pts: Diaz 9 Rebs: Granados 5 Asts: Leep 4		Pts: Gürbulak 19; Rebs: Gümüş, Gürbulak 7 Asts: Gürbulak 11

Musashino Forest Sport Plaza
Referees: Helen Rosenberg

30 August 2021
14:45

Report

Turkey	55–67	Japan
Scoring by quarter: 12–9, 15–19, 17–17, 11–22
Pts: Toprak 17; Rebs: Gürbulak 9 Asts: Gürbulak 6		Pts: Kozai 22; Rebs: Chokai 14; Asts: Chokai 8

Ariake Arena
Referees: Gustavo Mathias

Quarter-finals

1 September 2021
12:30

Report

United States	52–45	Turkey
Scoring by quarter: 11–18, 14–8, 10–6, 17–13
Pts: Bell 18; Rebs: Serio 9 Asts: Serio 10		Pts: Gürbulak 21; Rebs: Gürbulak 12; Asts: Toprak 7

Ariake Arena
Referees: Gustavo Mathias

5th–6th classification match

4 September 2021
14:45

Report

Turkey	58–74	Australia
Scoring by quarter: 18–23, 6–16, 16–20, 18–15
Pts: Toprak 12; Rebs: Gümüş 10; Asts: four players 3		Pts: Knowles 31; Rebs: Knowles, O'Neill-Thorne 6 Asts: Knowles 7

Ariake Arena
Attendance: 38
Referees: Hsieh Shu-fei

== Wheelchair fencing ==
Athlete	Event	Group stage			Quarterfinals	Semifinals	Final/BM	
Athlete	Event	Opposition	Result	Rank	Opposition Result	Opposition Result	Opposition Result	Rank
Hakan Akkaya	Men's épée A	Lambertini (ITA)	L 4–5	6	Did not advance			
Hakan Akkaya	Men's épée A	Rousell (CAN)	W 5–0	6	Did not advance			
Hakan Akkaya	Men's épée A	Shaburov (RPC)	L 4–5	6	Did not advance			
Hakan Akkaya	Men's épée A	Schmidt (GER)	L 3–5	6	Did not advance			
Hakan Akkaya	Men's épée A	Tian (CHN)	L 3–5	6	Did not advance			
Hakan Akkaya	Men's épée A	Al-Madhkhoori (IRQ)	L 3–5	6	Did not advance			
Hakan Akkaya	Men's foil A	Betti (ITA)	L 2–5	4	Did not advance			
Hakan Akkaya	Men's foil A	Nagaev (RPC)	L 3–5	4	Did not advance			
Hakan Akkaya	Men's foil A	Al-Madhkhoori (IRQ)	W 5–2	4	Did not advance			
Hakan Akkaya	Men's foil A	Osvath (HUN)	L 1–5	4	Did not advance			

== Wheelchair tennis ==
Busra Un qualified by world ranking.

Athlete	Event	Round of 32	Round of 16	Quarterfinals	Semifinals	Final / BM	
Athlete	Event	Opposition Result	Opposition Result	Opposition Result	Opposition Result	Opposition Result	Rank
Busra Un	Women's singles	Shuker (GBR); L 0–2	did not advance				

== See also ==
- Turkey at the Paralympics
- Turkey at the 2020 Summer Olympics
