= Turkey women's national goalball team results =

Turkey women's national goalball team results is a list of the results for the Turkey women's national goalball team in official competitions excluding friendly matches.

Win Draw Loss

== 2003-2009 ==
=== 2003 ===
The team competed in the 2003 IBSA World Games from 1 to 10 August 2011, in Quebec City, Canada. Ten teams competed. The first stage was pool play with five teams per pool and the top two teams in each pool advancing to the next round. Turkey women's team lost all four Round-Robin matches.

2003 IBSA World Games Goalball - Quebec City, Canada (10th)
Date	Opponent	Result	Ref
7 August	Sweden	L 0-10	
7 August	Japan	L 0-10	
7 August	South Korea	L 3-13	
7 August	Finland	L 1-11	

=== 2007 ===
The team competed at the 2007 IBSA Goalball European Championships, hosted by the Turkish Blind Sports Federation, in Antalya, Turkey with 11 teams contesting the women's competition. The team finished tenth.

2007 IBSA Goalball European Championships - Antalya, Turkey (10th)
Date	Opponent	Result	Ref
25 April	Spain	L 2-5	
26 April	Netherlands	L 2-10	
26 April	Ukraine	L 1-6	
27 April	Great Britain	L 4-8	
27 April	Russia	W 11-8	

=== 2009 ===
he team competed at the 2009 European Championships, in Munich, Germany, with eleven teams taking part. The team finished the event in last place.

2009 IBSA Goalball European Championships - Munich, Germany (11th)
Date	Opponent	Result	Ref
24 August	Germany	L 3-6	
25 August	Spain	L 3-5	
26 August	Finland	L 5-10	
27 August	Great Britain	L 3-8	
27 August	Israel	L 4-10	
28 August	Ukraine	L 1-3	

== 2010-2019 ==
=== 2010 ===
The team competed in the 2010 IBSA European Championships, in July 2010, in Eskişehir, Turkey. The team finished second.

2010 IBSA Goalball European Championships Women's B - Eskişehir, Turkey (silver)
Date	Opponent	Result	Ref
8 July	Poland	W 13-3	
9 July	Hungary	W 5-1	
9 July	Netherlands	W 4-3	
10 July	Ukraine	L 1-3	
10 July	Spain	W 9-1	
11 July	Spain	W 4-3	

=== 2011 ===
The team competed in the 2011 IBSA World Games from 1 to 10 April 2011, in Antalya, Turkey, organised by the Turkish Blind Sports Federation. They placed seventh in Group Y and won five of their six games, and were third in the final standings, behind Finland and Canada.

2011 IBSA World Games Goalball - Antalya, Turkey (bronze)
Date	Opponent	Result	Ref
4 April	Finland	L 6-7	
5 April	Greece	W 6-1	
6 April	Russia	W 11-3	
7 April	Ukraine	W 5-2	
8 April	Brazil	W 5-3	
9 April	Israel	W 8-3	
9 April	Finland	L 3-4	
10 April	Russia	W 4-1	

The team competed in the 2011 IBSA European Championships, from 17 to 23 October 2011, in Assens, Denmark. They finished eighth.

2011 IBSA Goalball European Championships Women's A - Assens, Denmark (8th)
Date	Opponent	Result	Ref
19 October	Sweden	W 9-1	
19 October	Israel	W 3-2	
20 October	Ukraine	L 3-4	
20 October	Great Britain	W 10-0	
21 October	Spain	L 2-3	
21 October	Israel	L 2-6	
21 October	Ukraine	L 2-5	

=== 2012 ===
The team competed in the 2012 IBSA European Championships (Division B), in Ascoli Piceno, Italy.

Team member were Neşe Mercan (#1), Sümeyye Özcan (#2), Sevda Altunoluk (#3), Gülşah Aktürk (#4), Sadiye Ardıç (#5), Buket Atalay (#6).

2012 IBSA Goalball European Championships B - Ascoli Piceno, Italy (gold)
Date	Opponent	Result	Ref
23-29 October	Hungary	W 4-1	
23-29 October	Germany	W 3-2	

=== 2013 ===
The team competed in the 2013 IBSA Goalball European Championships, Group A, from 1 to 11 November 2013, at Konya, Turkey. They came second, ahead of Israel but behind winners Russia.

2013 IBSA Goalball European Championships - Konya, Turkey (silver)
Date	Opponent	Result	Ref
1–6 November	Germany	L 6-12	
1 November	Israel	L 4-7	
2 November		W 7-3	
3 November		L 2-8	
4 November	Great Britain	W 13-3	
5 November	Finland	W 5-4	
6 November	Russia	L 2-4	

=== 2014 ===
The team took part at the Malmö Lady- and Men InterCup 2014 held in Sweden between 29 May and 1 June. They won the bronze medal.

The team members were: Seda Yıldız (#2), Sevda Altunoluk (#3), Gülşah Aktürk (#4), Sadiye Ardıç )#5), Buket Atalay (#6) and Sümeyye Özcan (#7).

Malmö Lady- and Men InterCup 2014 (bronze)
Date	Opponent	Result	Ref
29 May	Belgium	W 9-1	
29 May	Great Britain	W 8-3	
30 May	Ukraine	W 3-1	
30 May	Spain	W 10-0	
31 May	Finland	D 4-4	
31 May	United States	L 0-2	
1 June	Finland	W 7-1	

The team competed in the 2014 World Championships from 30 June to 5 July 2014, in Espoo, Finland. They were in Pool X, mercied Greece and Finland, drawing with Russia, and beating Japan 5:1 and the United States 8:2.

Athletes were Gülsah Aktürk (#4), Sevda Altunoluk (#3), Sadiye Ardic (#5), Buket Atalay (#6), Sümeyye Özcan (#7), and Seda Yıldız (#2).

2014 IBSA Goalball World Championships - Espoo, Finland (bronze)
Date	Opponent	Result	Ref
30 June	Finland	W 12-2	
30 June	Japan	W 5-1	
1 July	United States	W 8-2	
1 July	Germany	W 10-0	
2 July	Russia	D 0-0	
2 July	Israel	W 10-2	
3 July	Russia	L 1-2	
4 July	Japan	W 3*0	

=== 2015 ===
The team competed in the 2015 IBSA Goalball European A Championships in Kaunas, Lithuania. In Group Y, they beat Sweden 5:0 in the quarter-finals, mercied Ukraine 12:2, going on to beat Russia 5:0, to take the gold medal.

2015 IBSA Goalball European Championships - Kaunas, Lithuania (gold)
Date	Opponent	Result	Ref
8 July	Ukraine	W 7-1	
8 July	Spain	W 11-1	
9 July	Israel	W 9-7	
9 July	Greece	W 12-2	
10 July	Sweden	W 5-0	
10 July	Ukraine	W12-2	
11 July	Russia	W 5-0	

=== 2016 ===
The team competed in the 2016 Summer Paralympics, with competition from Thursday 8 September to finals on Friday 16 September 2016, in the temporary Future Arena, Rio de Janeiro, Brazil.

The following is the Turkey roster in the women's goalball tournament of the 2016 Summer Paralympics.

No.	Player	Class	Date of birth (age)
1	Neşe Mercan	B2	19 September 1994 (aged 21)
2	Seda Yıldız	B3	7 December 1998 (aged 17)
3	Sevda Altunoluk	B2	1 April 1994 (aged 22)
4	Gülşah Düzgün	B2	25 September 1995 (aged 20)
6	Buket Atalay	B2	14 August 1990 (aged 26)
7	Sümeyye Özcan	B1	15 January 1992 (aged 24)

Pos	Team	Pld	W	D	L	GF	GA	GD	Pts	Qualification
1	Turkey	4	4	0	0	37	11	+26	12	Quarter-finals
2	China	4	3	0	1	21	14	+7	9	Quarter-finals
3	Canada	4	2	0	2	16	22	−6	6	Quarter-finals
4	Ukraine	4	0	1	3	9	17	−8	1	Quarter-finals
5	Australia	4	0	1	3	6	25	−19	1	

Source: Paralympic.org

9 September 2016; 10:15	Turkey	12–4	Canada	Future Arena, Rio de Janeiro; Referees: Raili Sipura (FIN), Alexander Knecht (GER)
9 September 2016; 10:15	Altunoluk 8 Özcan 2 Mercan 2	Report	Burk 4	Future Arena, Rio de Janeiro; Referees: Raili Sipura (FIN), Alexander Knecht (GER)

10 September 2016; 14:30	China	2–7	Turkey	Future Arena, Rio de Janeiro; Referees: Dawna Christy (CAN), Nejc Jakic (SLO)
10 September 2016; 14:30	Zhang W. 1 Ju 1	Report	Altunoluk 7	Future Arena, Rio de Janeiro; Referees: Dawna Christy (CAN), Nejc Jakic (SLO)

11 September 2016; 18:45	Australia	2–12	Turkey	Future Arena, Rio de Janeiro; Referees: Joelle Boulet (CAN), Raili Sipura (FIN)
11 September 2016; 18:45	Horsburgh 2	Report	Özcan 5 Mercan 5 Yıldız 1 Altunoluk 1	Future Arena, Rio de Janeiro; Referees: Joelle Boulet (CAN), Raili Sipura (FIN)

12 September 2016; 20:45	Turkey	6–3	Ukraine	Future Arena, Rio de Janeiro; Referees: Rudi Janssen (BEL), Nejc Jakic (SLO)
12 September 2016; 20:45	Mercan 2 Altunoluk 2 Özcan 1 Yıldız 1	Report	Rud 2 Govorukha 1	Future Arena, Rio de Janeiro; Referees: Rudi Janssen (BEL), Nejc Jakic (SLO)

Quarter-finals

14 September 2016; 15:45	Turkey	15–5	Israel	Future Arena, Rio de Janeiro; Referees: Dawna Christy (CAN), Raquel Aguado (ESP)
14 September 2016; 15:45	Altunoluk 7 Özcan 4 Mercan 3 Ben-David 1 (o.g.)	Report	Ben-David 5	Future Arena, Rio de Janeiro; Referees: Dawna Christy (CAN), Raquel Aguado (ESP)

Semi-finals

15 September 2016; 20:00	Turkey	11–1	United States	Future Arena, Rio de Janeiro; Referees: Vilma Basinkaite (LTU), Nejc Jakic (SLO)
15 September 2016; 20:00	Altunoluk 8 Yıldız 2 Özcan 1	Report	Miller 1	Future Arena, Rio de Janeiro; Referees: Vilma Basinkaite (LTU), Nejc Jakic (SLO)

Finals

16 September 2016; 18:30	China	1–4	Turkey	Future Arena, Rio de Janeiro; Referees: Vilma Basinkaite (LTU), Raili Sipura (FIN)
16 September 2016; 18:30	Chen 1	Report	Altunoluk 3 Yıldız 1	Future Arena, Rio de Janeiro; Referees: Vilma Basinkaite (LTU), Raili Sipura (FIN)

=== 2017 ===
The team competed in the 2017 IBSA Goalball European A Championships from 15 to 23 September 2017, at Pajulahti, Nastola, Finland. Beating Finland 6:0 in the quarter-finals, defeating Greece 8:0 in the semi-finals, the team was beaten by Russia 3:6, to take the silver medal.

Athletes included Sevda Altınoluk (highest goal scorer of the tournament), and Neşe Mercan.

2017 IBSA Goalball European Championships - Nastola, Finland (silver)
Date	Opponent	Result	Ref
18 September	Sweden	W 8-2	
18 September	Germany	D 5-5	
19 September	Israel	W 6-5	
19 September	Great Britain	W 8-4	
20 September	Finland	W 6-0	
21 September	Greece	W 8-0	
22 September	Russia	L 3-6 (3-3)	

=== 2018 ===
The team competed in the 2018 World Championships from 3 to 8 June 2018, at the Baltiska Hallen, Malmö, Sweden. They placed second in Pool C, mercied the United States in the quarter-finals 12:2, and in the semi-finals, beat Brazil 5:2. They placed second, behind Russia, and ahead of Brazil. Team members were Sevda Altınoluk, Gülşah Düzgün, Neşe Mercan, Kader Çelik, Şeydanur Kaplan and Reyhan Yılmaz.

2018 IBSA Goalball World Championships - Malmö, Sweden (silver)
Date	Opponent	Result	Ref
3-8 June	Sweden	W 11-1	
3-8 June	Russia	L 5-7	
3-8 June	Israel	W 11-3	
3-8 June	Japan	W 5-0	
3-8 June	Australia	W 6-0	
3-8 June	United States	W 12-2	
3-8 June	Brazil	W 5-2	
3-8 June	Russia	L 2-3	

=== 2019 ===
The team competed in the 2019 IBSA Goalball European A Championships from 5 to 14 October 2019, in Rostock, Germany. They ranked first in Pool Y, to defeat Israel in the finals 8:6, to take the gold medal.

Athletes included Sevda Altunoluk (highest goal scorer of the tournament), Sevtap Altunoluk, Kader Çelik, Gülşah Düzgün, Neşe Mercan, and Seda Yıldız.

2019 IBSA Goalball European Championships - Rostock, Germany (gold)
Date	Opponent	Result	Ref
8-10 October	Great Britain	W 3-2	
8-10 October	Netherlands	W 10-0	
8-10 October	Israel	W 8-2	
8-10 October	Germany	W 12-2	
11 October	Finland	W 10-0	
12 October	Germany	W 7-0	
13 October	Israel	W 8-6	

== 2020-2029 ==
=== 2020 ===
The team competed in the 2020 Summer Paralympics, with competition from Wednesday 25 August to finals on Friday 3 September 2021, in the Makuhari Messe arena, Chiba, Tokyo, Japan. They qualified by placing second at the 2018 IBSA Goalball World Championships.

The following is the Turkey roster in the women's goalball tournament of the 2020 Summer Paralympics.

No.	Player	Class	Date of birth (age)
1	Fatma Gül Güler	B2	12 February 2004 (aged 17)
2	Reyhan Yılmaz	B2	18 November 2001 (aged 19)
3	Sevda Altunoluk	B2	1 April 1994 (aged 27)
4	Şeydanur Kaplan	B2	23 March 2000 (aged 21)
6	Kader Çelik	B2	1 January 2001 (aged 20)
7	Sevtap Altunoluk	B2	10 January 1995 (aged 26)

Pos	Team	Pld	W	D	L	GF	GA	GD	Pts	Qualification
1	Turkey	4	3	0	1	30	11	+19	9	Quarterfinals
2	United States	4	3	0	1	22	10	+12	9	Quarterfinals
3	Japan (H)	4	2	1	1	18	13	+5	7	Quarterfinals
4	Brazil	4	1	1	2	23	19	+4	4	Quarterfinals
5	Egypt	4	0	0	4	3	43	−40	0	

Source: TOCOG
Rules for classification: 1) points; 2) goal difference; 3) number of wins; 4) goals against; 5) head-to-head goal difference.
(H) Hosts

Round-robin

25 August 2021
14:45

Turkey	7–1	Japan
Sevd. Altunoluk 3', 11', 17', 21'; Güler 5', 20'; Yilmaz 21'	Report	Hagiwara 5'

Makuhari Messe, Tokyo
Referee: Svitlana Moroz (Ukraine), Raquel Aguado Gómez (Spain)

26 August 2021; 14:45	Egypt	2–12	Turkey	Makuhari Messe, Tokyo; Referees: Raquel Gomez Aguado (Spain), Raili Sipura (Finland)
26 August 2021; 14:45	Elgabry 1 Ezzeldin 1	Report	Sevd. Altunoluk 8 Sevt. Altunoluk 2 Güler 1 Çelik 1	Makuhari Messe, Tokyo; Referees: Raquel Gomez Aguado (Spain), Raili Sipura (Finland)

28 August 2021
20:30

Turkey	8–4	Brazil
Sevd. Altunoluk 1', 1', 5', 16', 17', 23'; Güler 2', 3'	Report	Amorim 6', 10'; Custodio 13', 15'

Makuhari Messe, Tokyo
Referee: Svitlana Moroz (Ukraine), Raili Sipura (Finland)

30 August 2021
19:00

United States	4–3	Turkey
Mason 8'; Miller 11'; Dennis 13', 22'	Report	Sevd. Altunoluk 1', 4', 9'

Makuhari Messe, Tokyo
Referee: Raquel Aguado Gómez (Spain), Svitlana Moroz (Ukraine)

Quarterfinal

1 September 2021
13:15

Turkey	10–6	Australia
Sevd. Altunoluk 1', 3', 4', 6', 6', 9', 17', 17'; Güler 5'; Çelik 24'	Report	Horsburgh 2', 11', 20', 21', 24'; Smith 5'

Makuhari Messe, Tokyo
Referee: Woradet Kultawongwattana (Thailand), Launel Scott (Canada)

Semifinal

2 September 2021
15:00

Turkey	8–5	Japan
Sevd. Altunoluk 2', 3', 8', 10', 18', 18', 22', 23'	Report	Hagiwara 1', 1', 8', 18', 19'

Makuhari Messe, Tokyo
Referee: Raili Sipura (Finland), Romualdas Vaitiekus (Lithuania)

Final

3 September 2021
17:45

United States	2–9	Turkey
Mason 9'; Miller 22'	Report	Sevd. Altunoluk 1', 1', 5', 6', 6', 8', 18', 18', 20'

Makuhari Messe, Tokyo
Referee: Raquel Aguado Gómez (Spain), Svitlana Moroz (Ukraine)

=== 2021 ===
The team competes in the 2021 IBSA Goalball European A Championships from 4 to 13 November 2021 in Samsun, Turkey. Turkey won the silver medal after losing to Russia 4–5 in the final.

Turkey team consisted of Fatma Gül Güler (#1), Reyhan Yılmaz (#2), Sevda Altunoluk (#3), Şeydanur Kaplan (#4), Sevtap Altunoluk (#7), Berfin Altan (#8) coached by Gültekin Karasu.

2021 IBSA Goalball European Championships - Samsun, Turkey (silver)
Date	Opponent	Result	Ref
5 November	Denmark	W 9-5	
6 November	Russia	W 2-1	
7 November	Great Britain	L 2-3	
9 November	Finland	W 6-2	
10 November	Germany	W 10-0	
11 November	Israel	W 7-6	
12 November	Russia	L 4-5	
