= Mongolia at the 2020 Summer Paralympics =

- IPC code: MGL
- NPC: Mongolian Paralympic Committee

in Tokyo
- Competitors: 11 in 6 sports
- Medals Ranked 59th: Gold 1 Silver 0 Bronze 0 Total 1

Summer Paralympics appearances (overview)
- 2000; 2004; 2008; 2012; 2016; 2020; 2024

Mongolia competed at the 2020 Summer Paralympics in Tokyo, Japan, from 24 August to 5 September 2021.

== Medalists ==
Medal	Name	Sport	Event	Date
Gold	Enkhbayaryn Sodnompiljee	Powerlifting	Men's 107 kg	30 August

== Competitors ==
The following is the list of number of competitors participating in the Games:

Sport	Men	Women	Total
Archery	1	1	2
Athletics	1	1	2
Judo	2	1	3
Powerlifting	1	0	1
Shooting	1	0	1
Taekwondo	1	1	2
Total	7	4	11

== Archery ==
Mongolia has entered one archer at Men's Individual Recurve Open.

== Shooting ==
Mongolia entered one athletes into the Paralympic competition. Ganbaatar Zandraa successfully break the Paralympic qualification at the 2019 WSPS World Cup which was held in Al Ain, United Arab Emirates.

Athlete	Event	Qualification		Final	
Athlete	Event	Score	Rank	Score	Rank
Ganbaatar Zandraa	Mixed P4 – 50 m pistol SH1	522	15	Did not advance	Did not advance

== Taekwondo ==
Mongolia qualified two athletes to compete at the Paralympics competition. All of them qualified by finishing first at K44 category to booked one of six quotas.

Athlete	Event	First round	Quarterfinals	Semifinals	Repechage 1	Repechage 2	Final / BM	
Athlete	Event	Opposition Result	Opposition Result	Opposition Result	Opposition Result	Opposition Result	Opposition Result	Rank
Men
Ganbatyn Bolor-Erdene	Men's – 61 kg	—	Bossolo (ITA); L 28–40	Did not advance	Vidal (ESP); W 31–11	Bozteke (TUR); L 22–23	Did not advance	7
Women
Khürelbaataryn Enkhtuya	Women's – 49 kg	—	Isakova (UZB); L 11–13	Did not advance	Es-Sabbar (MAR); W 37–21	Phuangkitcha (THA); L 30–33	Did not advance	7
