= Ziyodakhon Isakova =

Uzbekistani parataekwondo practitioner (born 1998)

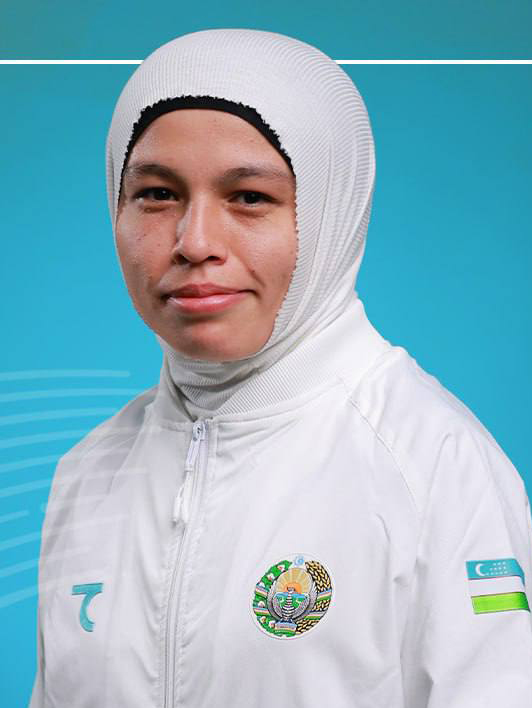

Personal information
- Nationality: Uzbekistani
- Born: 14 February 1998 (age 28) Uzbekistan District, Fergana Region, Uzbekistan

Sport
- Sport: Para Taekwondo
- Disability class: F44
Medal record
Women's Para Taekwondo
Representing Uzbekistan
Summer Paralympics
| Silver medal – second place | 2024 Paris | -47 kg |
World Championships
| Gold medal – first place | 2023 Veracruz | -47 kg |
| Bronze medal – third place | 2021 Antalya | -47 kg |
Asian Para Games
| Silver medal – second place | 2022 Hangzhou | 47 kg |

Ziyodakhon Isakova (Uzbek: Зиёдахон Исоқова, romanized: Ziyodaxon Isoqova; born 14 February 1998) is an Uzbekistani parataekwondo practitioner. She competed at the 2020 Summer Paralympics in the –49 kg category, having qualified via World Ranking. Isakova also won the silver medal at the 2022 Asian Para Games in the 47 kg event. She competed at the 2024 Summer Paralympics in the –52 kg category, winning silver.

== Biography ==
Ziyodakhon Isakova was born on 14 February 1998 in Uzbekistan District of Fergana Region and lives in Kulibek village of this district. She graduated from the National University of Uzbekistan.

== Career ==
Isakova started practicing para-taekwondo under the guidance of Ozodbek Hasanov. In 2017, she became a member of the national team of Uzbekistan. Currently, she is participating in competitions under the coaching of Bobur Koziyev.

On 21–22 May 2021, Isakova took part in the Asian Qualification tournament held in Amman, Jordan, and won the gold medal and the opportunity to participate in the delayed 2020 Summer Paralympics held in Tokyo. In the semi-final match of the Paralympic Games, Isakova lost to Leonor Espinoza of Peru with a score of 7–17. In the bronze medal match for the 3rd place, she lost to Khwansuda Phuangkitcha of Thailand by 2–18. In 2022, Isakova took part in the 2022 Asian Para Games held in Hangzhou, China, and won a silver medal in the -48 kg weight category. She won the gold medal at the 2023 World Championship held in Mexico.

At the 2024 Summer Paralympics, Isakova participated in the -47 kg event. She qualified for the semi-finals by defeating Zakia Khudadadi of the Refugee Paralympic Team 4–3 in the quarter-finals, and in the semi-finals she beat Thailand's Khwansuda Phuangkitcha 5–3. In the final, she lost to Leonor Espinoza with a score of 4–10, winning the silver medal.
