= Taekwondo at the 2020 Summer Paralympics – Women's 49 kg =

Taekwondo – Women's 49 kg K44 at the XVI Paralympic Games
- Venue: Makuhari Messe Hall B
- Date: 2 September 2021
- Competitors: 12 from 12 nations

Medalists
1st place, gold medalist(s)		Leonor Espinoza	Peru
2nd place, silver medalist(s)		Meryem Çavdar	Turkey
3rd place, bronze medalist(s)		Khwansuda Phuangkitcha	Thailand
3rd place, bronze medalist(s)		Anna Poddubskaia	RPC

The women's 49 kg taekwondo competition at the 2020 Summer Paralympics was held on 2 September 2021 at the Makuhari Messe Hall B.

== Results ==
=== Bracket ===
Round of 16
Ziyodakhon Isakova (UZB)	17
Zakia Khudadadi (AFG)	12
Danijela Jovanović (SRB)	9
Aruna Singh Tanwar (IND)	29
Soukaina Es-Sabbar (MAR)	15
Anna Poddubskaia (RPC)	41
Khwansuda Phuangkitcha (THA)	17
Royala Fataliyeva (AZE)	4

Quarterfinals
Khürelbaataryn Enkhtuya (MGL)	11
Ziyodakhon Isakova (UZB)	13
Aruna Singh Tanwar (IND)	21
Leonor Espinoza (PER)	84
Viktoriia Marchuk (UKR)	34
Anna Poddubskaia (RPC)	63
Khwansuda Phuangkitcha (THA)	13
Meryem Betül Çavdar (TUR)	34

Semifinals
Ziyodakhon Isakova (UZB)	7
Leonor Espinoza (PER)	17
Anna Poddubskaia (RPC)	11
Meryem Betül Çavdar (TUR)	22

Final
Leonor Espinoza (PER)	34
Meryem Betül Çavdar (TUR)	21

=== Repechage ===
Repechage 1
Danijela Jovanović (SRB)	3
Khwansuda Phuangkitcha (THA)	35
Soukaina Es-Sabbar (MAR)	21
Khürelbaataryn Enkhtuya (MGL)	37

Repechage 2
Khwansuda Phuangkitcha (THA)	33
Khürelbaataryn Enkhtuya (MGL)	30

Bronze medal
Ziyodakhon Isakova (UZB)	2
Khwansuda Phuangkitcha (THA)	18

Repechage 1
Zakia Khudadadi (AFG)	34
Viktoriia Marchuk (UKR)	48
Royala Fataliyeva (AZE)	WWD
Aruna Singh Tanwar (IND)

Repechage 2
Viktoriia Marchuk (UKR)	26
Royala Fataliyeva (AZE)	20

Bronze medal
Anna Poddubskaia (RPC)	46
Viktoriia Marchuk (UKR)	11
