= Turkey at the 2000 Summer Paralympics =

- IPC code: TUR
- NPC: Turkish Paralympic Committee
- Website: www.tmpk.org.tr (in Turkish)

in Sydney
- Competitors: 1 in 1 sport
- Medals: Gold 0 Silver 0 Bronze 0 Total 0

Summer Paralympics appearances (overview)
- 1992; 1996; 2000; 2004; 2008; 2012; 2016; 2020; 2024

Turkey competed at the 2000 Summer Paralympics in Sydney, Australia. Ali Uzun was the only competitor from Turkey.

== See also ==
- Turkey at the Paralympics
- Turkey at the 2000 Summer Olympics
