= Khürelbaataryn =

Khürelbaataryn (Mongolian: Хүрэлбаатарын) is a Mongolian patronymic. Notable people with this patronymic include:

- Khürelbaataryn Bulgantuya (born 1981), Mongolian politician
- Khürelbaataryn Enkhtuya (born 1990), Mongolian parataekwondo practitioner
- Khürelbaataryn Khash-Erdene (born 1983), Mongolian cross-country skier
- Khürelbaataryn Tsend-Ayuush (born 1990), Mongolian footballer
