= Turkey at the 1992 Summer Paralympics =

- IPC code: TUR
- NPC: Turkish Paralympic Committee
- Website: www.tmpk.org.tr (in Turkish)

in Barcelona
- Competitors: 1
- Medals: Gold 0 Silver 0 Bronze 0 Total 0

Summer Paralympics appearances (overview)
- 1992; 1996; 2000; 2004; 2008; 2012; 2016; 2020; 2024

Turkey competed at the 1992 Summer Paralympics in Barcelona, Spain. There was only one competitor from Turkey, who won no medals, and so, did not place in the medal table.

== See also ==
- Turkey at the Paralympics
- Turkey at the 1992 Summer Olympics
