= Taekwondo at the 2024 Summer Paralympics – Women's 47 kg =

Taekwondo – Women's 47 kg K44 at the XVII Paralympic Games
- Venue: Grand Palais
- Date: 29 August 2024
- Competitors: 12 from 12 nations

Medalists
1st place, gold medalist(s)		Leonor Espinoza	Peru
2nd place, silver medalist(s)		Ziyodakhon Isakova	Uzbekistan
3rd place, bronze medalist(s)		Khwansuda Phuangkitcha	Thailand
3rd place, bronze medalist(s)		Zakia Khudadadi	Refugee Paralympic Team

The women's 47 kg taekwondo competition at the 2024 Summer Paralympics is going to be held on 29 August 2024 at the Grand Palais.

== Format ==
All the taekwondo events at the 2024 Paralympic Games are run as single elimination with a repechage system. The four highest ranked players at each weight class are given byes to the quarter final, the remaining players contest the round of 16.

The players that lose in the quarter-finals enter the first round of the repechage system, The two losing quarterfinalists from each half of the draw face each other, again in single elimination. The two winners of these repechage rounds each face the losing semifinalist from the opposite half of the draw in the bronze medal finals.

== Results ==
Key

- DQB = Disqualified for unsportsmanlike behaviour
- WDB = Win by disqualification for unsportsmanlike behaviour
- WDR = Withdrawn
- WWD = Win by Withdrawal

=== Bracket ===
Round of 16
Naoual Laarif (MAR)	12
Lia Chachibaia (GEO)	11
Leonor Espinoza (PER)	28
Guileine Chemogne (CMR)	9
Aruna Tanwar (IND)	0
Nurcihan Ekinci (TUR)	19
Zakia Khudadadi (RPT)	21
Lilisbet Rodriguez Rivero (CUB)	11

Quarterfinals
Claudia Romero (MEX)	DQB
Naoual Laarif (MAR)	WBD
Leonor Espinoza (PER)	19
Maryam Abdollahpour Deroei (IRI)	9
Khwansuda Phuangkitcha (THA)	8
Nurcihan Ekinci (TUR)	4
Zakia Khudadadi (RPT)	3
Ziyodakhon Isakova (UZB)	4

Semifinals
Naoual Laarif (MAR)	WDR
Leonor Espinoza (PER)	WWD
Khwansuda Phuangkitcha (THA)	3
Ziyodakhon Isakova (UZB)	5

Gold medal match
Leonor Espinoza (PER)	10
Ziyodakhon Isakova (UZB)	4

=== Repechage ===
Repechage
Maryam Abdollahpour Deroei (IRI)	Bye

Bronze medal
Maryam Abdollahpour Deroei (IRI)	4
Khwansuda Phuangkitcha (THA)	4

Repechage
Nurcihan Ekinci (TUR)	1
Zakia Khudadadi (RPT)	9

Bronze medal
Naoual Laarif (MAR)	WDR
Zakia Khudadadi (RPT)	WWD
