= Leonor Espinoza =

Peruvian parataekwondo practitioner

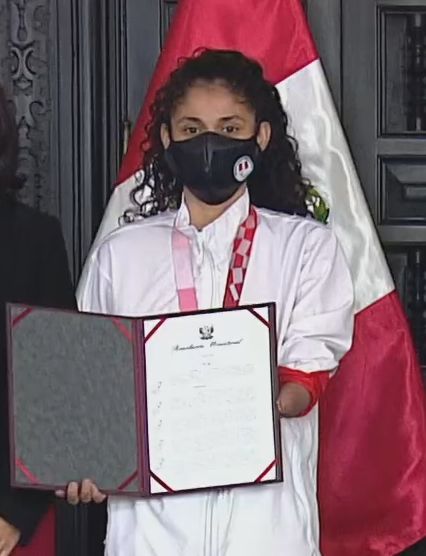

Personal information
- Full name: Leonor Angelica Espinoza Carranza
- Born: 19 March 1998 (age 28) Lima, Peru

Sport
- Sport: Para taekwondo
- Disability class: T44
Medal record
Representing Peru
Women's para taekwondo
Event	1st	2nd	3rd
Paralympic Games	2	0	0
Parapan American Games	2	0	0
Total	4	0	0
Paralympic Games
Gold medal – first place	2020 Tokyo	-49 kg
Gold medal – first place	2024 Paris	-47 kg
Parapan American Games
Gold medal – first place	2019 Lima	−49 kg
Gold medal – first place	2023 Santiago	−47 kg

Leonor Angelica Espinoza Carranza (Note: In this Spanish name, the first or paternal surname is Espinoza and the second or maternal family name is Carranza.) (born 19 March 1998) is a Peruvian parataekwondo practitioner. She competed at the 2020 Summer Paralympics in the 49 kg category, winning the gold medal in the event.
