= Zakia Khudadadi =

Afghan taekwondo practitioner

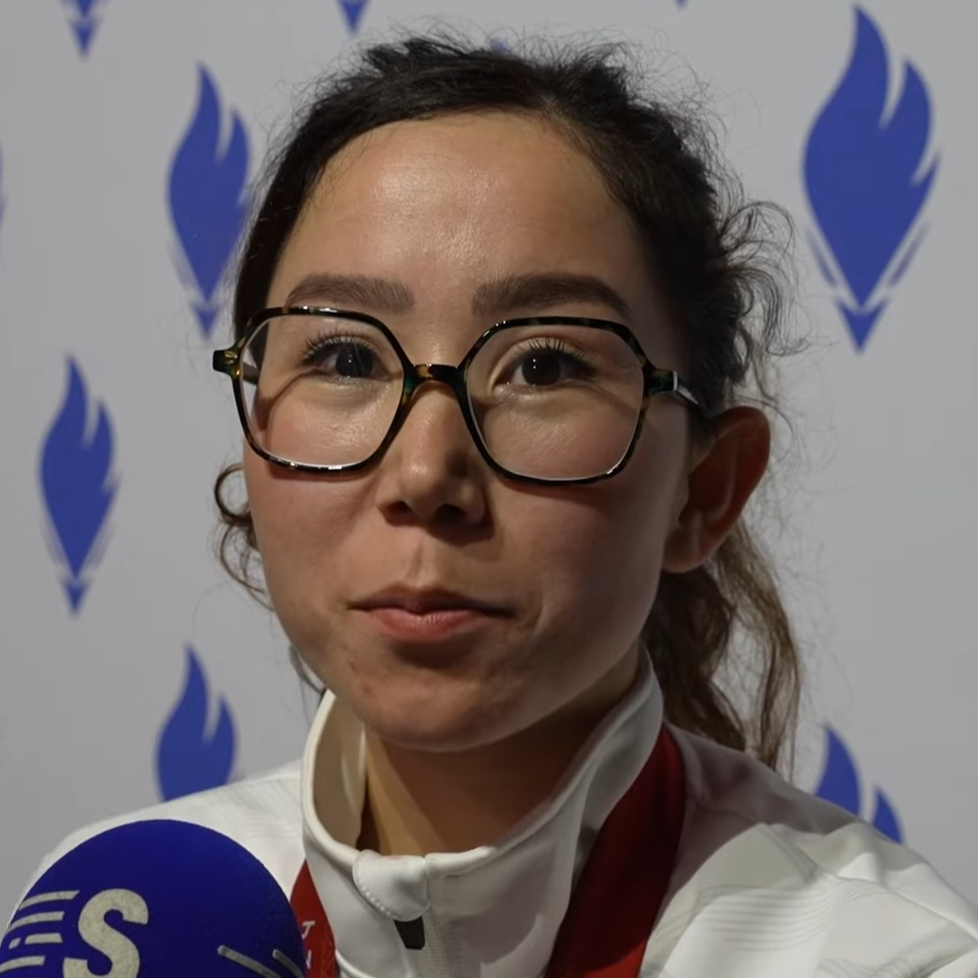
- Khudadadi in 2024

Personal information
- Native name: ذکیه خدادادی
- Nationality: Afghan
- Citizenship: France
- Born: 29 September 1998 (age 27) Herat Province, Islamic Emirate of Afghanistan

Sport
- Country: France
- Sport: Taekwondo
Medal record
Women's para taekwondo
Representing the (International Paralympic Committee) Refugee Paralympic Team
Paralympic Games
Bronze medal – third place	2024 Paris	–47 kg K44
Representing France
European Championships
Gold medal – first place	2026 Munich	−47 kg K44
European Para Championships
Gold medal – first place	2023 Rotterdam	–47 kg K44

Zakia Khudadadi (Hazaragi: ذکیه خدادادی; born 29 September 1998) is a Hazara parataekwondo practitioner. She is the first Afghan female taekwondo practitioner. She rose to prominence after winning the African International Parataekwondo Championship in 2016 at the age of 18. She represented Afghanistan at the 2020 Summer Paralympics. She was initially denied the opportunity to compete at her first Paralympics due to the Taliban takeover but was later allowed by the International Paralympic Committee to compete in the event after being safely evacuated from Afghanistan.

She was able to compete and became the first Afghan female Paralympic competitor to compete at the Paralympics in 17 years since Mareena Karim's participation at the 2004 Summer Paralympics. She also officially became the first Afghan female sportsperson to participate in an international sporting event after the Taliban takeover and the first-ever member of the Refugee Paralympic Team to win a medal.

== Biography ==
Born in Herat Province, Khudadadi belongs to the Hazara ethnic group. She has only one functional arm.

Khudadadi was motivated to take up the sport of taekwondo since Afghanistan's only Olympic medals came in taekwondo in 2008 and 2012. She was inspired by Rohullah Nikpai, who is highly regarded as Afghanistan's first (and currently only) Olympic medalist. After the downfall of the Taliban in 2001 she, like many other women in Afghanistan, was encouraged to compete in sporting events just like men did. However, she had most of her training sessions at home and in her backyard as her opportunities to represent the local clubs were hampered due to the presence of Taliban in her home province of Herat.

She won the 2016 African International Parataekwondo Championship held in Egypt. She received wild card entry to participate in the delayed Tokyo 2020 Summer Paralympics, where she was chosen as one of the two competitors from Afghanistan alongside track athlete Hossain Rasouli. Khudadadi qualified to compete in the women's K44 Under-49 kg event.

She left her parents and travelled to Kabul in order to train in preparation for the Summer Paralympics. However, Afghanistan's participation in the games was imperiled following the Fall of Kabul to the Taliban. Afghan athletes were also unable to leave Kabul due to the closure of the airports. Khudadadi went into hiding from the Taliban and publicly requested immediate help in order to safely leave Afghanistan and take part at the Tokyo Paralympics. She was confirmed to be on the evacuation list of Spain.

"As a woman in Afghanistan and as a representative of women in Afghanistan, please. I am aiming to participate in the Tokyo Paralympics. Please reach out to me and help me. I would like to ask all the organizations that protect women's rights and the governments of each country around the world. Please help us not to be deprived of our rights as a woman in Afghanistan and as a player in the Paralympics. We have been struggling hard in difficult situations. I would like to show you this result. Please help us not to waste our efforts."

— Zakia Khudadadi after the Taliban takeover

On 28 August 2021, Khudadadi, alongside her male compatriot Hossain Rasouli, arrived in Tokyo after being airlifted from Kabul to Paris by the Royal Australian Air Force as part of international evacuation efforts, ending the uncertainties which prevailed regarding Afghanistan's participation at the Tokyo Paralympics. The President of the International Paralympic Committee, Andrew Parsons, announced that both of the Afghan athletes would not be available for interviews and that permission had been granted to them to skip the usual press conferences.

On 2 September 2021, she competed in the round of 16 event at the 2020 Tokyo Paralympics and lost the round to Ziyodakhon Isakova of Uzbekistan. Khudadadi subsequently qualified to the repechage round but lost to Ukraine's Viktoriia Marchuk. Khudadadi competed in the 2023 European Para Championships in Brussels, Belgium, as member of the Refugee team and won gold in her category.

On August 29, 2024, Khudadadi made history at the Paris Paralympics, becoming the first-ever Refugee Paralympic Team medallist. She said, "This medal is for all the women of Afghanistan and all the refugees of the world. I hope that one day there will be peace in my country". In December 2024, Zakia Khudadadi was included on the BBC's 100 Women list. Her life story is featured in the 2024 France Télévisions documentary A corps perdus directed by Thierry Demaizière and Alban Teurlai.

On October 28, 2025, Khudadadi became a French citizen. Her first competition as part of the French team was the Taekwondo European Championship 2026 in Munich, where she defended her title on May 11, 2026.

== See also ==
- Cindy Ngamba, Cameroonian athlete, first medalist for the Refugee Olympic Team at the 2024 Summer Olympics
