= Aruna Tanwar =

Indian para-taekwondo athlete

Aruna Singh Tanwar
Personal information
- Nationality: Indian
- Born: Haryana

Sport
- Country: India
- Sport: Taekwondo
- Coached by: Swaraj Kumar Singh
Medal record
Representing India
Asian Para Games
Bronze medal – third place	2022 Hangzhou	47 kg

Aruna Tanwar is an Indian Para Taekwondo athlete and two time Olympian from Haryana. She is currently ranked World No.4 in the W-49 kg | K43 | and World No. 30 in the W-49 kg | K44 event category of World Para Taekwondo Events. She qualified to represent India at the 2024 Summer Paralympics at Paris, her second Olympics.

== Career ==
Tanwar was born in Dinod village, near Bhiwani in Haryana. She began practicing Taekwondo at eight years and she is a five-time National champion. She is a B.P.Ed. student at Chandigarh University.

=== 2020 Summer Paralympics ===
Aruna became first-ever Indian Taekwondo athlete to qualify for Paralympics Olympic Games at Tokyo, Japan on the allocation of a bi-partite invitation spots, where Taekwondo Paralympic event was featured for the first time. She represented Indian Team in Taekwondo at the 2020 Summer Paralympics in Tokyo, Japan. She is coached by Swaraj Kumar Singh.

== Tournaments record ==
International Competition Results
Year	Event	G- Rank	Location	Place
2019	5th Asian Para Open Taekwondo Championships	G-4/G-2	Amman Jordan	Bronze
2019	8th World Para Taekwondo Championships	G-10	Antalya Turkey	Bronze
2018	4th Asian Para Taekwondo Championships	G-4/G-2	Hochiminh Vietnam	Silver
2018	3rd WT President's Cup Asian Region Para Taekwondo Championships	G-1	Kish Island Iran	Silver
2018	Kimunyong International Para Taekwondo Open	G-1	Seoul South Korea	Gold
