= Anna Poddubskaia =

Russian para taekwondo practitioner

Personal information
- Born: 27 October 1985 (age 40) Tuapse, Russia

Sport
- Country: Russia
- Sport: Para taekwondo
Medal record
Representing RPC
Paralympic Games
Bronze medal – third place	2020 Tokyo	49 kg
Representing Russia
European Championships
Silver medal – second place	2021 Istanbul	52 kg
Bronze medal – third place	2024 Belgrade	52 kg

Anna Poddubskaia (born 27 October 1985) is a Russian para taekwondo practitioner. She won one of the bronze medals in the women's 49 kg event at the 2020 Summer Paralympics in Tokyo, Japan. She competed at the Summer Paralympics under the flag of the Russian Paralympic Committee.
