= Altunoluk =

Altunoluk is a Turkish surname. Notable people with the surname include:

- Sevda Altunoluk (born 1994), Turkish Paralympian goalball player
- Sevtap Altunoluk (born 1995), Turkish Paralympian goalball player
