= Khürelbaataryn Enkhtuya =

Mongolian parataekwondo practitioner

Personal information
- Nationality: Mongolian
- Born: 6 September 1990 (age 35) Mongolia

Sport
- Sport: Para Taekwondo
- Disability class: F44
Medal record
Women's Para Taekwondo
Representing Mongolia
World Championships
Gold medal – first place	2017 London	49 kg
Silver medal – second place	2019 Antalya	49 kg
European Championships
Gold medal – first place	2018 Plovdiv	49 kg

Khürelbaataryn Enkhtuya (Mongolian: Хүрэлбаатарын Энхтуяа; born 6 September 1990), also commonly known as Enkhtuya Khurelbaatar, is a Mongolian parataekwondo practitioner. She competed at the 2020 Summer Paralympics in the 49 kg category, having qualified via World Ranking.
