= Taekwondo at the Summer Paralympics =

Taekwondo competition

- Events: 6 (men: 3; women: 3; mixed: 0)

Games
- 1960; 1964; 1968; 1972; 1976; 1980; 1984; 1988; 1992; 1996; 2000; 2004; 2008; 2012; 2016; 2020; 2024
- Medalists

Taekwondo debuted at the 2020 Summer Paralympics in Tokyo, Japan.

Para taekwondo is a variant of taekwondo for athletes with a variety of physical disabilities. The sport is governed by World Taekwondo (WT) since 2006. Only kyorugi (sparring) discipline is included and not poomsae (martial art forms).

== Medal table ==
Updated to 2024 Summer Paralympics

Rank	NPC	Gold	Silver	Bronze	Total
1	Uzbekistan	2	2	0	4
2	Brazil	2	1	2	5
3	Great Britain	2	1	1	4
4	Peru	2	0	0	2
5	Turkey	1	4	2	7
6	Iran	1	2	2	5
7	Mexico	1	1	1	3
8	Mongolia	1	1	0	2
9	Azerbaijan	1	0	1	2
9	China	1	0	1	2
9	Denmark	1	0	1	2
12	Israel	1	0	0	1
13	Croatia	0	1	0	1
13	Egypt	0	1	0	1
13	France	0	1	0	1
13	Neutral Paralympic Athletes	0	1	0	1
17	RPC	0	0	3	3
18	Argentina	0	0	2	2
18	Greece	0	0	2	2
18	Morocco	0	0	2	2
18	South Korea	0	0	2	2
18	Thailand	0	0	2	2
18	United States	0	0	2	2
24	Australia	0	0	1	1
24	Chinese Taipei	0	0	1	1
24	Georgia	0	0	1	1
24	Italy	0	0	1	1
24	Nepal	0	0	1	1
24	Refugee Paralympic Team	0	0	1	1
Totals (29 entries)		16	16	32	64

== Nations ==
Nation	60	64	68	72	76	80	84	88	92	96	00	04	08	12	16	20	Total
Afghanistan (AFG)																1	1
Argentina (ARG)																1	1
Aruba (ARU)																1	1
Australia (AUS)																1	1
Azerbaijan (AZE)																4	1
Brazil (BRA)																3	1
China (CHN)																1	1
Costa Rica (CRC)																1	1
Croatia (CRO)																1	1
Denmark (DEN)																1	1
Egypt (EGY)																2	1
France (FRA)																2	1
Great Britain (GBR)																3	1
India (IND)																1	1
Iran (IRI)																3	1
Italy (ITA)																1	1
Jamaica (JAM)																1	1
Japan (JPN)																3	1
Kazakhstan (KAZ)																3	1
Libya (LBA)																1	1
Mexico (MEX)																3	1
Mongolia (MGL)																2	1
Morocco (MAR)																3	1
Nepal (NEP)																1	1
Peru (PER)																1	1
Refugee Paralympic Team (RPT)																1	1
RPC (RPC)																4	1
Senegal (SEN)																1	1
Serbia (SRB)																2	1
South Korea (KOR)																1	1
Spain (ESP)																1	1
Thailand (THA)																1	1
Turkey (TUR)																6	1
Ukraine (UKR)																3	1
United States (USA)																2	1
Uzbekistan (UZB)																3	1
Nations																37	
Competitors																71	
Year	60	64	68	72	76	80	84	88	92	96	00	04	08	12	16	20	

== See also ==
- Para Taekwondo
- Taekwondo at the Summer Olympics
