= Taekwondo at the 2020 Summer Paralympics =

Taekwondo at the XVI Paralympic Games
- Taekwondo pictogram of the 2020 Summer Paralympics
- Venue: Makuhari Messe
- Dates: 2–4 September 2021
- Competitors: 71 in 6 events from 37 nations

Taekwondo at the 2020 Summer Paralympics was held at the Makuhari Messe; the same location where goalball, volleyball and wheelchair fencing took place. This was the first time that taekwondo was included in the Summer Paralympic Games.

The 2020 Summer Olympic and Paralympic Games were postponed to 2021 due to the COVID-19 pandemic. They kept the 2020 name and were held from 24 August to 5 September 2021.

Only Kyorugi was practiced at the Tokyo 2020 Games. There are two classes at Para Taekwondo, K43 for athletes with restrictions on both sides of their arms below the elbow joint and K44 for athletes with restrictions on one side in their arm or leg. Both classes competed in the K44 class at the Tokyo 2020 Games.

== Qualification ==
Ranking lists began from 1 January 2018 to 31 January 2020. Continental qualification tournaments also determined what athletes would compete in the Summer Paralympics.

== Schedule ==
Gender	Day	1	2	3
Men	Weight class	61	75	+75
Men	Participants	12	12	12
Women	Weight class	49	58	+58
Women	Participants	12	11	12

Schedule
Event↓/Date →	Sept 2	Sept 3	Sept 4
Men's 61 kg	F		
Men's 75 kg		F	
Men's +75 kg			F
Women's 49 kg	F		
Women's 58 kg		F	
Women's +58 kg			F

== Qualified nations ==
- Afghanistan (1)
- Argentina (1)
- Aruba (1)
- Australia (1)
- Azerbaijan (4)
- Brazil (3)
- China (1)
- Costa Rica (1)
- Croatia (1)
- Denmark (1)
- Egypt (2)
- France (2)
- Great Britain (3)
- India (1)
- Iran (3)
- Italy (1)
- Jamaica (1)
- Japan (3)
- Kazakhstan (3)
- Libya (1)
- Mexico (3)
- Mongolia (2)
- Morocco (3)
- Nepal (1)
- Peru (1)
- Refugee Paralympic Team (1)
- RPC (4)
- Senegal (1)
- Serbia (2)
- South Korea (1)
- Spain (1)
- Thailand (1)
- Turkey (6)
- Ukraine (3)
- United States (2)
- Uzbekistan (3)

== Medal table ==
Rank	NPC	Gold	Silver	Bronze	Total
1	Brazil	1	1	1	3
2	Iran	1	1	0	2
3	Denmark	1	0	0	1
3	Mexico	1	0	0	1
3	Peru	1	0	0	1
3	Uzbekistan	1	0	0	1
7	Great Britain	0	1	1	2
7	Turkey	0	1	1	2
9	Croatia	0	1	0	1
9	Egypt	0	1	0	1
11	RPC	0	0	3	3
12	Argentina	0	0	1	1
12	Australia	0	0	1	1
12	China	0	0	1	1
12	South Korea	0	0	1	1
12	Thailand	0	0	1	1
12	United States	0	0	1	1
Totals (17 entries)		6	6	12	24

== Medalists ==
Event	Gold	Silver	Bronze
Men's 61 kg	Nathan Torquato; Brazil	Mohamed El-Zayat; Egypt	Mahmut Bozteke; Turkey
Men's 61 kg	Nathan Torquato; Brazil	Mohamed El-Zayat; Egypt	Daniil Sidorov; RPC
Men's 75 kg	Juan García; Mexico	Mahdi Pourrahnama; Iran	Joo Jeong-hun; South Korea
Men's 75 kg	Juan García; Mexico	Mahdi Pourrahnama; Iran	Juan Samorano; Argentina
Men's +75 kg	Asghar Aziziaghdam; Iran	Ivan Mikulić; Croatia	Evan Medell; United States
Men's +75 kg	Asghar Aziziaghdam; Iran	Ivan Mikulić; Croatia	Zainutdin Ataev; RPC
Women's 49 kg	Leonor Espinoza; Peru	Meryem Çavdar; Turkey	Khwansuda Phuangkitcha; Thailand
Women's 49 kg	Leonor Espinoza; Peru	Meryem Çavdar; Turkey	Anna Poddubskaia; RPC
Women's 58 kg	Lisa Gjessing; Denmark	Beth Munro; Great Britain	Silvana Fernandes; Brazil
Women's 58 kg	Lisa Gjessing; Denmark	Beth Munro; Great Britain	Li Yujie; China
Women's +58 kg	Guljonoy Naimova; Uzbekistan	Débora Menezes; Brazil	Amy Truesdale; Great Britain
Women's +58 kg	Guljonoy Naimova; Uzbekistan	Débora Menezes; Brazil	Janine Watson; Australia

== See also ==
- Taekwondo at the 2020 Summer Olympics
- Para Taekwondo
- Parataekwondo at the Summer Paralympics
