= Meryem Betül Çavdar =

Turkish para taekwondo practitioner (born 2000)

Personal information
- Born: 3 May 2000 (age 26) Afyon, Turkey

Sport
- Sport: Para Taekwondo
- Disability class: F44
- Team: EGO Spor Club
Medal record
Women's Para Taekwondo
Representing Turkey
Paralympic Games
Silver medal – second place	2020 Tokyo	K44 49 kg
Bronze medal – third place	2024 Paris	K44 52 kg
World Championships
Bronze medal – third place	2017 London	K44 49 kg,
Gold medal – first place	2021 Istanbul	K4 52 kg
European Championships
Gold medal – first place	2017 Sofia	K44 49 kg
Gold medal – first place	2019 Bari	K44 49 kg
Gold medal – first place	2021 Istanbul	K44 52 kg
Silver medal – second place	2022 Manchester	K44 52 kg
Silver medal – second place	2024 Belgrade	K44 52 kg
Silver medal – second place	2026 Munich	K44 52 kg
Bronze medal – third place	2018 Plovdiv	K44 49 kg
European Para Championships
Gold medal – first place	2023 Rotterdam	K44 -52

Meryem Betül Çavdar (born 3 May 2000) is a Turkish Para Taekwondo practitioner.

She obtained a quota for participation at the 2020 Summer Paralympics in Tokyo, Japan. She won the silver medal in the 49 kg event at the 2020 Summer Paralympics in Tokyo, Japan. In 2021, she took the gold medal in the K44 52 kg event at the World Championships in Istanbul, Turkey. She picked up the gold medal at the 2023 European Para Championships in Rotterdam, Netherlands.
