= Ayşegül Pehlivanlar =

Turkish Paralympic sport shooter

Personal information
- Born: 5 December 1979 (age 46)
- Years active: 2013–

Sport
- Sport: Paralympic pistol shooting
- Event: P2 Women's 10m air pistol SH1, P4 Mixed 50m air pistol SH1
- Club: Atıcılık ve Avcılık SK, Istanbul
Medal record
Representing Turkey
Paralympic pistol shooting
Paralympic Games
Silver medal – second place	2020 Tokyo	P2 SH1
Bronze medal – third place	2016 Rio de Janeiro	P2 SH1
IPC World Cup
Gold medal – first place	2015 Fort Benning	P2 SH1
- Updated on 10 September 2016

Ayşegül Pehlivanlar (born 5 December 1979) is a Turkish paralympic shooter competing in the pistol events. She won a bronze medal at the 2016 Summer Paralympics in Rio de Janeiro.

== Early life ==
Ayşegül Pehlivanlar was born on 5 December 1979. She was paralyzed due to a spinal cord injury that was the result of a car accident, which took place while returning from a vacation together with her parents. Pehlivanlar's mother was killed in the accident, and she began to use a wheelchair from then on.

== Sporting career ==
In 2013, Pehlivanlar's skills in a shooting range at İzmir drew the attention of a coach. This was the first time in her life she had visited a shooting range. She admitted that "with the help of shooting sport" she overcame her introversion she developed after the accident and goes outside more compared to before," adding that "she is today more self-confident." She says that "she learned one can do everything if believes it." Her father, a former sportsperson, is her biggest supporter in sports.

Pehlivanlar competes in the P2 women's 10m air pistol SH1 and P4 Mixed 50m air pistol SH1 events. SH1 is the Paralympic shooting classification for athletes, who do not require a shooting stand to support the firearm. Currently, she is a member of the shooting and hunting club "Atıcılık ve Avcılık SK" in Istanbul.

She participated at the Turkish Championships in Mersin for the first time in 2015, and captured the gold medal. She was then admitted to the national team in April 2015, and represented her country at international competitions like IPC Shooting World Cup 2015 in Osijek, Croatia, 2015 in Fort Benning United States and 2016 in Bangkok, Thailand.

In 2015, Pehlivanlar took the gold medal with 188.9 points in the final in the Women's P2 10m air pistol SH1 event at the IPC Shooting World Cup held in Fort Benning, United States. This success brought her a quota place for the 2016 Summer Paralympics. It will be her first participation at the Paralympics. She was also part of the P4 50m Air Pistol Mixed SH1 team at the same competition.

She became the runner-up at the 2016 Turkish Championships held in Mersin. Pehlivanlar became bronze medalist in the 10m air pistol SH1 event at the 2016 Summer Paralympics. She won the silver medal in the P2 10m air pistol SH1 event at the 2020 Summer Paralympics.
