= Çağla Baş =

Turkish basketball player (1992-)

Personal information
- Full name: Çağla Baş Atakal
- Born: Çağla Baş; 26 July 1992 (age 33) Altınordu, Ordu, Turkey
- Years active: 2008–

Sport
- Sport: Wheelchair basketball, Paralympic pistol shooting
- Events: R2 40 shots 10m air riflel standing SH1 Women's, R3 60 shots 10m air rifle prone SH1 Mixed, FTR1 10m Falling Targets Rifle SH1 Mixed
- Club: Altinordu Belediyespor
- Coached by: Tolga Korkusuz (shooting)
Medal record
Paralympic rifle shooting
Representing Turkey
IPC Shooting World Championships
Silver medal – second place	2014 Suhl	R2 SH1
IPC Shooting World Cup
Bronze medal – third place	2015 Antalya	R3 SH1 Mixed
Silver medal – second place	2013 Szczecin	R2 SH1 Women's
Silver medal – second place	2013 Szczecin	FTR1 SH1 Mixed

Çağla Baş Atakal (born Çağla Baş on 26 July 1992), also known as Çağla Atakal, is a Turkish female paralympic shooter competing in the air rifle events. She qualified to represent Turkey at the 2016 Summer Paralympics in Rio de Janeiro. Baş also plays on a wheelchair basketball team at a national level.

== Early life ==
Çağla Baş was born in Altınordu district of Ordu Province, Turkey on 26 July 1992. She lives in her hometown.

She married Erdem Atakal in December 2014 after being together for 7 years. She drew the attention of her future husband during a wheelchair basketball game she was playing in Istanbul.

== Sporting career ==
Baş began her sporting career at eleven of age by playing basketball. She is a member of the wheelchair basketball team of Altınordu Belediyespor in her hometown. Encouraged by her mother, she entered also Paralympic shooting in 2008. She competes in the R2 40 shots 10m air rifle standing SH1 women's, R3 10m 60 shots air rifle prone SH1 mixed and FTR1 10m falling targets rifle SH1 mixed events. The SH1 classification is for Paralympic athletes, who can shoot without the need of a shooting stand to support the firearm. Her coach is Tolga Korkusuz.

Baş became bronze medalist seven years in a row at national competitions.

Representing her country, she took part at the IPC Shooting World Championships 2010 held in Zagreb, Croatia and 2014 in Suhl, Germany, at the IPC Shooting World Cup 2013 in Szczecin, Poland, 2015 in Antalya, Turkey, 2016 in Bangkok, Thailand, and at the 2013 IPC Shooting European Championships in Alicante, Spain.

She won a silver medal in the R2 SH1 event, and another silver medal in the FTR1 SH1 mixed event at the 2013 IPC Shooting World Cup in Poland, a bronze medal in the R3 SH1 mixed event at the 2015 World Cup in Turkey, a silver medal in the R2 SH1 event at the 2014 IPC Shooting World Championships. The success in 2014 brought her a quota place at the 2016 Rio Olympics. This will be her first participation at the Paralympics.
