= Reyhan Yılmaz =

Turkish Paralympic goalball player

Personal information
- Born: 18 November 2001 (age 24) Denizli, Turkey

Sport
- Sport: Goalball
Medal record
Women's goalball
Representing Turkey
Paralympic Games
Gold medal – first place	2020 Tokyo	Team
Gold medal – first place	2024 Paris	Team
IBSA World Championships
Silver medal – second place	2018 Malmö	Team
IBSA European Championships
Silver medal – second place	2017 Lahti	Team
Silver medal – second place	2021 Samsun	Team

Reyhan Yılmaz (born 18 November 2001) is a Turkish Paralympian goalball player having visual impairment. She is a member of the national team taking part at the 2020 Summer Paralympics.

She won the silver medal at the 2017 European Goalball Championships in Lahti, Finland. At the 2018 Goalball World Championships in Malmö, Sweden, she won the silver medal.

== Honours ==
=== International ===
- (gold) 2024 Summer Paralympics in Paris, France
- (silver) 2017 IBSA Goalball European Championship in Lahti, Finland.
- (silver) 2018 Goalball World Championships in Malmö, Sweden
- (gold) 2020 Summer Paralympics in Tokyo, Japan
- (silver) 2021 IBSA Goalball European Championship in Samsun, Turkey.
