= Sibel Çam =

Turkish Paralympic powerlifter (born 1990)

Personal information
- Born: 4 July 1990 (age 35) Cihanbeyli, Konya, Turkey

Sport
- Country: Turkey
- Sport: Paralympic powerlifting
- Weight class: ‍–‍73 kg
- Club: Konya Meram Bld. SK
- Coached by: Arif Kıran
Medal record
Women's Powweling
Representing Turkey
Paralympic Games
| Bronze medal – third place | 2024 Paris | -73 kg |
World Championships
| Silver medal – second place | 2019 Nur Sultan | -73 kg |
World Cup
| Bronze medal – third place | 2024 Sharm El Sheikh | -73 kg |
| Silver medal – second place | 2024 Dubai | -73 kg |
European Open Championships
| Gold medal – first place | 2022 Tbilisi | -73 kg |
| Gold medal – first place | 2018 Berck-su-Mér | -73 kg |

Sibel Çam (born 4 July 1990) is a Turkish Paralympic powerlifter who competes in the -73 kg division.

== Sport career ==
Çam started powerlifting at the age of 22 after she became aware of the sport through a retired wrestling coach. She prepared her home living room as a training area, and exercised for competitions with the help of his father. She competes in the -73 kg division. She is a member of Konya Meram Belediyesi Sport Club, where she is coached by Arif Kıran.

Çam competed at the 2016 World Para Powerlifting Games in Rio de Janeiro, Brazil.

At the 2017 Word Para Powerlifting Junior Championships in Mexico City, Mexico, she ranked fourth.

Çam captured the gold medal at the 2018 World Para Powerlifting European Open Championships in Berck-su-Mér, France.

She won the silver medal at the 2019 World Para Powerlifting Championships in Nur Sultan, Kazakhstan after lifting 124 kg.

Çam participated at the 2020 Summer Paralympics in Tokyo, Japan. She failed to achieve any result.

Çam captured the gold medal at the 2022 European Open Championships in Tbilisi, Georgia.

At the 2024 Para Powerlifting World Cup, she took the silver medal in Dubai, United Arab Emirates, and the bronze medal in Sharm El Sheikh, Egypt. These results enabled her to receive a quota for participation at the Summer Paralympics in Paris, France.

== Personal life ==
Sibel Çam was born in Cihanbeyli district of Konya Province, central Turkey on 4 July 1990. She lived with her parents in a village before the family moved to Konya. At the age of 13, she became ill. She was diagnosed with transverse myelitis, a spinal cord paralysis due to viral infection. Applied physical therapy did not help, so she became walking disabled, and has to use wheelchair. The family lived in an apartment without an elevator on the second floor. Her mother had to carry her on back the stairs down when she was to go out.
