= Kader Çelik =

Turkish Paralympic goalball player

Personal information
- Born: 1 January 2001 (age 25) Ağrı, Turkey

Sport
- Sport: Goalball
Medal record
Goalball
Representing Turkey
Paralympics
Gold medal – first place	2020 Tokyo	Team
World Championships
Silver medal – second place	2018 Malmö	Team
IBSA European Championships
Gold medal – first place	2019 Rostock	Team
Silver medal – second place	2017 Lahti	Team

Kader Çelik (born 1 January 2001) is a Turkish Paralympian goalball player having visual impairment. She is a member of the national team taking part at the 2020 Summer Paralympics.

She won the silver medal at the 2017 European Goalball Championships in Lahti, Finland. At the 2018 Goalball World Championships in Malmö, Sweden, she won the silver medal. She played with the national team, which won the gold medal at the 2019 European Goalball Championship in Rostock, Germany.

== Honours ==
=== International ===
- (silver) 2017 IBSA Goalball European Championships Div. A in Lahti, Finland.
- (silver) 2018 Goalball World Championships in Malmö, Sweden.
- (gold) 2019 IBSA Goalball European Championship in Rostock, Germany
- (gold) 2020 Summer Paralympics in Rio de Janeiro, Brazil.
