= Khwansuda Phuangkitcha =

Thai parataekwondo practitioner

Personal information
- Nationality: Thailand
- Born: 31 August 2000 (age 25) Prachuap Khiri Khan, Thailand

Sport
- Sport: Para Taekwondo
- Disability class: T44
Medal record
Representing Thailand
Event	1st	2nd	3rd
Paralympic Games	0	0	2
World Championships	1	0	0
Paralympic Games
Bronze medal – third place	2020 Tokyo	-49 kg
Bronze medal – third place	2024 Paris	-47 kg
World Championships
Gold medal – first place	2019 Antalya	-49 kg
European Taekwondo Championships
Gold medal – first place	2024 Belgrade	−47 kg K44
Asian Para Games
Gold medal – first place	2022 Hangzhou	47 kg

Khwansuda Phuangkitcha (Thai: ขวัญสุดา พวงกิจจา; born 31 August 2000) is a Thai Para Taekwondo practitioner.

== Career ==
Phuangkitcha became the first world champion in Para Taekwondo for Thailand, following her victory in the 49 kg event at the 2019 World Championship in Antalya, Turkey. She competed at the 2020 Summer Paralympics in the 49 kg category and won the bronze medal in the event. Following her win, she became Thailand's first Para Taekwondo medalist at the Paralympic Games.
