= Turkish National Paralympic Committee =

National Paralympic Committee of Turkey

Coordinates: 41°03′38″N 29°00′29″E

National Paralympic Committee
- Country: Turkey
- Code: TUR
- Created: 2002
- Recognized: 2002
- Continental association: EPC
- Headquarters: Beşiktaş, Istanbul
- President: Yavuz Kocaömer
- Secretary General: İbrahim Gümüşdal
- Website: www.tmpk.org.tr

Turkish National Paralympic Committee (Turkish: Türkiye Milli Paralimpik Komitesi) is the National Paralympic Committee representing Turkey. It was founded in 2002.

The organization's office is situated at Hatta Halim Sok. 13/1 in Gayrettepe neighborhood of Beşiktaş, Istanbul.

== See also ==
- Turkish National Olympic Committee
