= 2020 Summer Paralympics =

Multi-parasport event in Tokyo, Japan

XVI Paralympic Games
- Location: Tokyo, Japan
- Motto: United by Emotion (Note: Only an English version motto is used during the Games. The Japanese equivalent of the motto was not adopted.)
- Nations: 162 (including the RPT and RPC teams) (Note: Originally, each Russian athlete participated as an individual qualification, so such a special note corresponding to the nation is not an appropriate description.)
- Athletes: 4,393
- Events: 539 in 22 sports
- Opening: 24 August 2021
- Closing: 5 September 2021
- Opened by: Naruhito; Emperor of Japan
- Closed by: Andrew Parsons; President of the International Paralympic Committee
- Cauldron: Yui Kamiji; Karin Morisaki; Shunsuke Uchida
- Stadium: Japan National Stadium (Note: Named "Olympic Stadium" during the Games.)

The 2020 Summer Paralympics (Japanese: 東京2020パラリンピック競技大会, Hepburn: Tōkyō Nizeronizero Pararinpikku Kyōgi Taikai), branded as the Tokyo 2020 Paralympic Games, were an international multi-sport parasports event held from 24 August to 5 September 2021 in Tokyo, Japan. They were the 16th Summer Paralympic Games as organized by the International Paralympic Committee (IPC).

Originally scheduled to take place from 25 August to 6 September 2020, both the 2020 Summer Olympics and Paralympics were postponed by a year in March 2020 due to the COVID-19 pandemic, with the rescheduled Games still referred to as Tokyo 2020 for marketing and branding purposes. As with the Olympics, the Games were largely held behind closed doors with no outside spectators due to a state of emergency in the Greater Tokyo Area and other prefectures. The Games were the second Summer Paralympics hosted by Tokyo since 1964, and the third Paralympics held in Japan overall since the 1998 Winter Paralympics in Nagano. Due to the postponement of the Paralympics because of the COVID-19 pandemic, it was also the first (and only) Paralympic Games to be held in an odd-numbered year and the first Summer Paralympics to be held in a non-leap year.

The Games featured 539 medal events in 22 sports, with badminton and taekwondo both making their Paralympic debut to replace football 7-a-side and sailing. China topped the medal table for the fifth consecutive Paralympics, with 96 golds and 207 total medals. Great Britain finished second for the ninth time, with 41 golds and 124 total medals. The United States finished third, with 37 golds, their best finish since the 2008 games, and 104 total medals. The RPC finished fourth, with a total of 36 golds and 118 total medals, putting them in third place when ranked by total medals.

== Bids ==
The host of the 2020 Summer Olympics would also host the 2020 Summer Paralympics, according to a 2001 agreement between the International Paralympic Committee and the International Olympic Committee. At the 125th IOC Session, Tokyo was awarded the 2020 Summer Olympics and Paralympics via a tie-breaker in the second round of voting.

== Preparations ==
=== Transport ===
Ahead of the 2016 Summer Paralympics closing ceremony, Governor of Tokyo Yuriko Koike advocated for the city to improve its accessibility as a legacy project for the Games. She cited narrow roadways with no sidewalks, buildings constructed with narrow doorways, and low ceilings, as challenges that needed to be overcome. In particular, she called for a transition to underground power lines to facilitate the widening of roads.

A number of Toyota e-Palette self-driving vehicles had been adapted to provide transport to athletes in the Paralympic Games village. On 27 August, however, the use of the vehicles was suspended after one collided with an athlete before all vehicles were re-used 3 days later.

=== Volunteers ===
In September 2018, applications to be volunteers at the Olympic and Paralympic Games were released. By January 2019 186,101 applications had been received. Interviews to whittle the numbers down began in February 2019 and training taking place in October 2019. The volunteers at the venues were known as "Field Cast" and the volunteers in the city were known as "City Cast". These names were chosen from a shortlist of four out of an original 149 pairs of names. The other shortlisted names were "Shining Blue and Shining Blue Tokyo", "Games Anchor and City Anchor" and "Games Force and City Force". The names were chosen by the people who had applied to be volunteers at the games.

=== Medals ===
The designs of the medals for the 2020 Summer Paralympics were unveiled on 25 August 2019; as with the Olympic medals, they are constructed using recycled metals that were obtained through an electronics recycling programme. The medals feature a design inspired by traditional folding hand fans to symbolise the shared experience of the Paralympics; alternating sectors containing textured areas visually and tactually depict flowers, leaves, rocks, water and wood to symbolise the geology of Japan. The pivot where the fan meets is stated to symbolise the unity of Paralympic athletes. The obverse of the medal contains an untextured version of the fan pattern, the Paralympic emblem, and inscriptions in braille. To aid those with visual impairments, the edges and ribbons of the medals contain one, two, or three circular indentations and silicone convex dots for gold, silver, and bronze medals respectively so that they can be easily identified by touch.

Medals used in the games

Bronze medal	Silver medal	Gold medal

=== Impact of the COVID-19 pandemic ===
The 2020 Summer Olympics were largely held behind closed doors due to the COVID-19 pandemic in Japan, and a state of emergency in Tokyo issued by Prime Minister Yoshihide Suga, though events in some regions could be held with up to 10,000 spectators or 50% capacity (whichever is smaller) if they were not subject to a state of emergency. The declaration was originally in effect from 12 July through 22 August 2021 (two days before the Paralympic opening ceremony); on 2 August, citing worsening rates of infection, Suga announced that the existing state of emergency would be extended through 31 August, and expanded to several other prefectures (including three that neighbour Tokyo).

New daily cases in Tokyo reached over 4,000 by 11 August 2021; it was anticipated that no public spectators would be admitted during the Paralympics in Tokyo and other affected regions, as with the Olympics. Organizers discussed other options for some form of spectator presence, such as inviting local school students to attend events (a program which was also employed during the Olympics, and largely scaled back due to the pandemic). It was later confirmed that there would be no public spectators at venues in the Tokyo, Chiba, and Saitama prefectures. On 19 August, the state of emergency was extended through 12 September 2021, and expanded to include Shizuoka.

On 20 August 2021, Tokyo Organizing Committee delivery officer Hidemasa Nakamura stated that the biosecurity protocols for the Paralympics had been expanded upon those from the Olympics due to the increased vulnerability to COVID-19 among its athletes, but that Tokyo was facing deteriorating hospital capacity, and that "It's a fight against time so we need to make sure that sufficient communication is taken at a speedy manner." Paula Tesoriero of the New Zealand delegation stated that the Tokyo Organizing Committee and IPC had "worked tirelessly to create the safest and secure environment possible with a focus on continuing to stay vigilant".

On 4 September, after four consecutive days without any new COVID-19 cases within the Paralympic bubble, the IPC commended the Tokyo Organizing Committee for their work in handling the pandemic, with a spokesperson stating that "the amount of work that has gone in behind the scenes to deliver what you have seen over the past three weeks has been phenomenal."

=== Torch relay ===
The details of the torch relay route were announced on 21 November 2019. There was a Heritage Flame Celebration that was held in Stoke Mandeville, and flame lighting festivals that took place in 43 of Japan's 47 prefectures between 13 and 17 August 2020. In the second phase of the relay, another 4 rituals were performed in the 3 other prefectures that were jointly hosting the events with Tokyo between 18 and 20 August throughout the three prefectures that co-hosted Paralympic events during the run-up to the Paralympic Opening Ceremony and the last day the Tokyo Prefecture torch was lit. The flames from each of the flame lighting festivals hosted in each prefecture were brought together in Tokyo. On the night of August 21, at the front of the Akasaka Palace all the 48 flames were unified and the third and last phase of the relay began and lasted 4 days. This rote was the same used for the last legs of the 2020 Summer Olympics torch relay.

Aluminium was taken from temporary housing in Fukushima to make the torches for the Olympic and Paralympic flames. More than 10,000 pieces of aluminium were used and organizers contacted local authorities to see which houses were no longer being used.

== The Games ==
=== Sports ===
The 2020 Summer Paralympics featured 539 events in 22 sports. Badminton and taekwondo made their Paralympic debut in Tokyo, while classifications were added or realigned in other sports; canoe, shooting, table tennis, track cycling, and wheelchair fencing saw increases in the number of medal events held, while there were reductions in athletics and swimming.

2020 Summer Paralympic Sports Programme

- Archery (9)
- Athletics (167)
- Badminton (14)
- Boccia (7)
- Canoe (9)
- Cycling (51)
  - Road (34)
  - Track (17)
- Equestrian (11)
- Football 5-a-side (1)
- Goalball (2)
- Judo (13)
- Powerlifting (20)
- Rowing (4)
- Shooting (13)
- Sitting volleyball (2)
- Swimming (146)
- Table tennis (31)
- Taekwondo (6)
- Triathlon (8)
- Wheelchair basketball (2)
- Wheelchair fencing (16)
- Wheelchair rugby (1)
- Wheelchair tennis (6)

==== New sports ====
In January 2014, the IPC began accepting bids for new sports to be added to the Paralympic programme. Six sports were reported to have made bids, including amputee football, badminton, power hockey, powerchair football, and taekwondo. New disciplines were also proposed in existing events, including 3x3 basketball (in wheelchair and ID classifications), and visually impaired match racing and one-person multi-hull in sailing.

On 31 January 2015, the IPC officially announced that badminton and taekwondo had been added to the Paralympic programme for 2020. They replaced football 7-a-side and sailing, which were dropped due to an insufficient international reach.

== Participating National Paralympic Committees ==
Participating nations

Country by team size

On 9 December 2019, the World Anti-Doping Agency (WADA) banned Russia from all international sport for a period of four years, after the Russian government was found to have tampered with lab data that it provided to WADA in January 2019 as a condition of the Russian Anti-Doping Agency being reinstated. On 26 April 2021, it was confirmed Russian athletes would represent the Russian Paralympic Committee, with the acronym 'RPC'.

At least five countries withdrew from the Games due to COVID-19-related concerns, including North Korea (which declined to participate in either the Olympics or Paralympics), as well as Kiribati, Samoa, Tonga, and Vanuatu due to budgetary concerns tied to COVID-19 travel restrictions. Absent direct flights to Japan, the four countries' athletes would have had to travel to Tokyo via Australia and New Zealand as international borders to those countries for non-residents had been closed since March 2020, and would be subject to 14-day quarantine periods before their flight to Japan, and on their way back to their home countries.

On 16 August 2021, Afghanistan (representing the Islamic Republic of Afghanistan) withdrew from the Games due to violence and instability in the country following the Taliban's capture of Kabul, which left their team of Zakia Khudadadi (taekwondo) and Hossain Rasouli (athletics) unable to travel to Tokyo. Their national flag was still paraded during the opening ceremony as a signal of solidarity. However, after a "major global operation", the two athletes were successfully evacuated to France, where they trained at INSEP in Paris before arriving in a flight with the Paris 2024 delegation in Tokyo on 28 August. IPC president Andrew Parsons stated that the team would not be available to press conferences and were given special permission to skip interacting with other athletes at the village. Rasouli missed the event where he was originally intended to compete, the men's 100 m T47. After declining an offer to compete in the 400 m event as an alternative, Rasouli accepted an extra spot in the men's long jump T47.

The following 162 teams qualified at least one athlete. Six of them, Bhutan, Grenada, Guyana, Maldives, Paraguay, and Saint Vincent and the Grenadines, made their debut appearances at the Paralympic Games. Two of them returned to the Games after not sending delegations in 2016: Barbados (that for the first time in its history it had not classified its athletes for the Games) along with Luxembourg (who had classified athletes for the last time in Beijing 2008).

Participating National Paralympic Committee teams
- Afghanistan (2)
- Algeria (57)
- Angola (2)
- Argentina (57)
- Armenia (1)
- Aruba (1)
- Australia (174)
- Austria (25)
- Azerbaijan (36)
- Bahrain (2)
- Barbados (1)
- Belarus (19)
- Belgium (34)
- Benin (2)
- Bermuda (1)
- Bhutan (3)
- Bosnia and Herzegovina (16)
- Botswana (2)
- Brazil (258)
- Bulgaria (4)
- Burkina Faso (2)
- Burundi (2)
- Cambodia (1)
- Cameroon (3)
- Canada (130)
- Cape Verde (2)
- Central African Republic (1)
- Chile (19)
- China (255)
- Colombia (61)
- Costa Rica (9)
- Croatia (22)
- Cuba (17)
- Cyprus (3)
- Czech Republic (29)
- Democratic Republic of the Congo (2)
- Denmark (25)
- Dominican Republic (5)
- Ecuador (8)
- Egypt (49)
- El Salvador (3)
- Estonia (5)
- Ethiopia (3)
- Faroe Islands (1)
- Fiji (2)
- Finland (17)
- France (143)
- Gabon (2)
- The Gambia (2)
- Georgia (14)
- Germany (137)
- Ghana (3)
- Great Britain (221)
- Greece (46)
- Grenada (2)
- Guatemala (2)
- Guinea (2)
- Guinea-Bissau (2)
- Guyana (1)
- Haiti (1)
- Honduras (1)
- Hong Kong (24)
- Hungary (39)
- Iceland (6)
- India (54)
- Indonesia (23)
- Iran (62)
- Iraq (19)
- Ireland (31)
- Israel (33)
- Italy (113)
- Ivory Coast (3)
- Jamaica (4)
- Japan (260) (host)
- Jordan (10)
- Kazakhstan (26)
- Kenya (9)
- Kuwait (3)
- Kyrgyzstan (2)
- Laos (1)
- Latvia (7)
- Lebanon (1)
- Lesotho (1)
- Liberia (2)
- Libya (2)
- Lithuania (11)
- Luxembourg (1)
- Madagascar (1)
- Malawi (1)
- Malaysia (22)
- Maldives (2)
- Mali (2)
- Malta (2)
- Mauritius (4)
- Mexico (60)
- Moldova (6)
- Mongolia (11)
- Montenegro (5)
- Morocco (37)
- Mozambique (2)
- Namibia (3)
- Nepal (1)
- Netherlands (74)
- New Zealand (29)
- Nicaragua (2)
- Niger (2)
- Nigeria (22)
- North Macedonia (1)
- Norway (15)
- Oman (3)
- Pakistan (2)
- Palestine (2)
- Panama (3)
- Papua New Guinea (2)
- Paraguay (2)
- Peru (11)
- Philippines (4)
- Poland (93)
- Portugal (34)
- Puerto Rico (3)
- Qatar (2)
- Refugee Paralympic Team (6)
- Republic of the Congo (2)
- Romania (9)
- RPC (246) (Note: Neutral athletes from Russia competed under a flag depicting a one-off emblem representing the Russian Paralympic Committee.)
- Rwanda (14)
- Saint Vincent and the Grenadines (1)
- São Tomé and Príncipe (1)
- Saudi Arabia (7)
- Senegal (3)
- Serbia (20)
- Sierra Leone (2)
- Singapore (10)
- Slovakia (27)
- Slovenia (7)
- Somalia (1)
- South Africa (34)
- South Korea (86)
- Spain (134)
- Sri Lanka (9)
- Sweden (29)
- Switzerland (21)
- Syria (3)
- Chinese Taipei (10)
- Tajikistan (1)
- Tanzania (2)
- Thailand (76)
- Togo (1)
- Tunisia (25)
- Turkey (87)
- Uganda (4)
- Ukraine (138)
- United Arab Emirates (12)
- United States (242)
- Uruguay (2)
- Uzbekistan (44)
- Venezuela (27)
- Vietnam (7)
- Virgin Islands (1)
- Yemen (2)
- Zambia (1)
- Zimbabwe (2)

=== Number of athletes by National Paralympic Committee ===
4,403 athletes from 162 NPCs: Ranking listed by number of athletes. As of 24 August 2021

NPC	Athletes
Japan (host)	254
Brazil	234
China	248
RPC	242
United States	235
Great Britain	207
Australia	174
France	137
Ukraine	137
Germany	134
Spain	127
Canada	126
Italy	113
Poland	90
Turkey	87
South Korea	86
Netherlands	70
Thailand	74
Colombia	61
Iran	62
Mexico	60
Algeria	57
Argentina	54
India	54
Egypt	49
Greece	44
Uzbekistan	47
Hungary	37
Morocco	35
Azerbaijan	36
Belgium	31
Portugal	33
South Africa	34
Israel	32
New Zealand	29
Ireland	27
Czech Republic	28
Sweden	26
Slovakia	27
Venezuela	26
Kazakhstan	26
Austria	24
Denmark	25
Tunisia	25
Hong Kong	24
Indonesia	23
Croatia	22
Malaysia	21
Nigeria	22
Switzerland	21
Serbia	20
Belarus	19
Chile	19
Cuba	16
Finland	17
Iraq	19
Bosnia and Herzegovina	16
Norway	15
Georgia	13
Rwanda	14
United Arab Emirates	12
Lithuania	11
Mongolia	11
Peru	11
Singapore	10
Chinese Taipei	10
Jordan	10
Costa Rica	9
Kenya	9
Romania	9
Sri Lanka	9
Ecuador	8
Latvia	7
Saudi Arabia	7
Slovenia	7
Vietnam	7
Iceland	6
Moldova	6
Philippines	6
Refugee Paralympic Team	6
Dominican Republic	5
Estonia	5
Montenegro	5
Bulgaria	4
Jamaica	4
Mauritius	4
Uganda	4
Bhutan	3
Cameroon	3
Cyprus	3
El Salvador	3
Ethiopia	3
Ghana	3
Ivory Coast	3
Kuwait	3
Namibia	3
Oman	3
Panama	3
Puerto Rico	3
Senegal	3
Solomon Islands	3
Syria	3
Afghanistan	2
Angola	2
Bahrain	2
Benin	2
Botswana	2
Burkina Faso	2
Burundi	2
Cape Verde	2
Fiji	2
Gabon	2
The Gambia	2
Grenada	2
Guatemala	2
Guinea-Bissau	2
Kyrgyzstan	2
Liberia	2
Libya	2
Maldives	2
Mali	2
Malta	2
Mozambique	2
Nicaragua	2
Niger	2
Pakistan	2
Paraguay	2
Palestine	2
Papua New Guinea	2
Qatar	2
Republic of the Congo	2
Sierra Leone	2
Tanzania	2
Uruguay	2
Yemen	2
Zimbabwe	2
Armenia	1
Aruba	1
Barbados	1
Bermuda	1
Cambodia	1
Central African Republic	1
Faroe Islands	1
Guinea	1
Guyana	1
Haiti	1
Honduras	1
Laos	1
Lebanon	1
Lesotho	1
Luxembourg	1
Madagascar	1
Malawi	1
Nepal	1
North Macedonia	1
Saint Vincent and the Grenadines	1
São Tomé and Príncipe	1
Somalia	1
Tajikistan	1
Togo	1
Virgin Islands	1
Zambia	1
Total	4,399

== Test events ==
There were test events before the Olympic and Paralympic Games; these were contested from June 2019 to June 2020 before the start of the 2020 Summer Olympics. The selected Paralympic sports were athletics (2–3 May 2020), goalball (28–29 September 2019), triathlon (15–18 August 2019), powerlifting (26–27 September 2019), swimming (16 April 2020) and wheelchair rugby (12–15 March 2020). It was announced in February 2019 that test events would be under the banner "Ready, Steady, Tokyo". 22 of the 56 events would be organised by the Tokyo organising committee and the rest by national and international organisations. World Sailing's World Cup Series, held at Enoshima, was the first test event, while the last the Tokyo Challenge Track Meet in May 2020.

All test events scheduled after 12 March 2020 were postponed due to COVID-19.

== Medal summary ==
* Host nation (Japan)

2020 Summer Paralympics medal table
Rank	NPC	Gold	Silver	Bronze	Total
1	China	96	60	51	207
2	Great Britain	41	38	45	124
3	United States	37	36	31	104
4	RPC	36	33	49	118
5	Netherlands	25	17	17	59
6	Ukraine	24	47	27	98
7	Brazil	22	20	30	72
8	Australia	21	29	30	80
9	Italy	14	29	26	69
10	Azerbaijan	14	1	4	19
11–86	Remaining teams	209	230	279	718
Totals (86 entries)		539	540	589	1,668

=== Podium sweeps ===
There were five podium sweeps, as follows:

Date	Sport	Event	Team	Gold	Silver	Bronze	Ref
27 August	Swimming	Men's 50 metre butterfly S5	China	Zheng Tao	Wang Lichao	Yuan Weiyi	
28 August	Swimming	Women's 100 m backstroke S11	China	Cai Liwen	Wang Xinyi	Li Guizhi	
30 August	Swimming	Men's 50 m backstroke S5	China	Zheng Tao	Ruan Jingsong	Wang Lichao	
1 September	Swimming	Men's 50 m freestyle S5	China	Zheng Tao	Yuan Weiyi	Wang Lichao	
4 September	Athletics	Women's 100 metres T63	Italy	Ambra Sabatini	Martina Caironi	Monica Contrafatto	

== Calendar ==
The preliminary schedule was announced on 19 October 2018. The finalized schedule was released on 13 August 2019.

The original schedule was from 25 August to 10 September 2020. To postpone the Paralympics until 2021, all events were delayed by 364 days (one day less than a full year to preserve the same days of the week), giving a new schedule of 24 August to 5 September 2021.

All times and dates use Japan Standard Time (UTC+9)

OC	Opening ceremony	●	Event competitions	1	Gold medal events	CC	Closing ceremony

August/September 2021		August								September					Events
August/September 2021		24th Tue	25th Wed	26th Thu	27th Fri	28th Sat	29th Sun	30th Mon	31st Tue	1st Wed	2nd Thu	3rd Fri	4th Sat	5th Sun	Events
Ceremonies		OC												CC	—N/a
Archery					●	1	1	2	2		1	1	1		9
Athletics					13	17	20	15	21	17	18	17	24	5	167
Badminton										●	●	●	7	7	14
Boccia						●	●	●	●	4	●	●	3		7
Canoe											●	4	5		9
Cycling	Road								19	6	5	4			51
Cycling	Track		4	5	5	3									51
Equestrian				3	2	●	1	5							11
Football 5-a-side							●	●	●		●		1		1
Goalball			●	●	●	●	●	●	●	●	●	2			2
Judo					4	4	5								13
Powerlifting				4	4	4	4	4							20
Rowing					●	●	4								4
Shooting								3	2	2	1	2	2	1	13
Sitting volleyball					●	●	●	●	●	●	●	●	1	1	2
Swimming			16	14	14	14	13	15	14	15	15	16			146
Table tennis			●	●	●	5	8	8	●	●	5	5			31
Taekwondo											2	2	2		6
Triathlon						4	4								8
Wheelchair basketball			●	●	●	●	●	●	●	●	●	●	1	1	2
Wheelchair fencing			4	4	2	4	2								16
Wheelchair rugby			●	●	●	●	1								1
Wheelchair tennis					●	●	●	●	●	1	1	2	2		6
Daily medal events			24	30	44	56	63	52	58	45	48	55	49	15	539
Cumulative total			24	54	102	158	221	273	331	376	424	479	528	543	539
August/September 2021		24th Tue	25th Wed	26th Thu	27th Fri	28th Sat	29th Sun	30th Mon	31st Tue	1st Wed	2nd Thu	3rd Fri	4th Sat	5th Sun	Total events
August/September 2021		August								September					Total events

== Venues ==
The venues for the Paralympic games as detailed on the Tokyo 2020 official website:

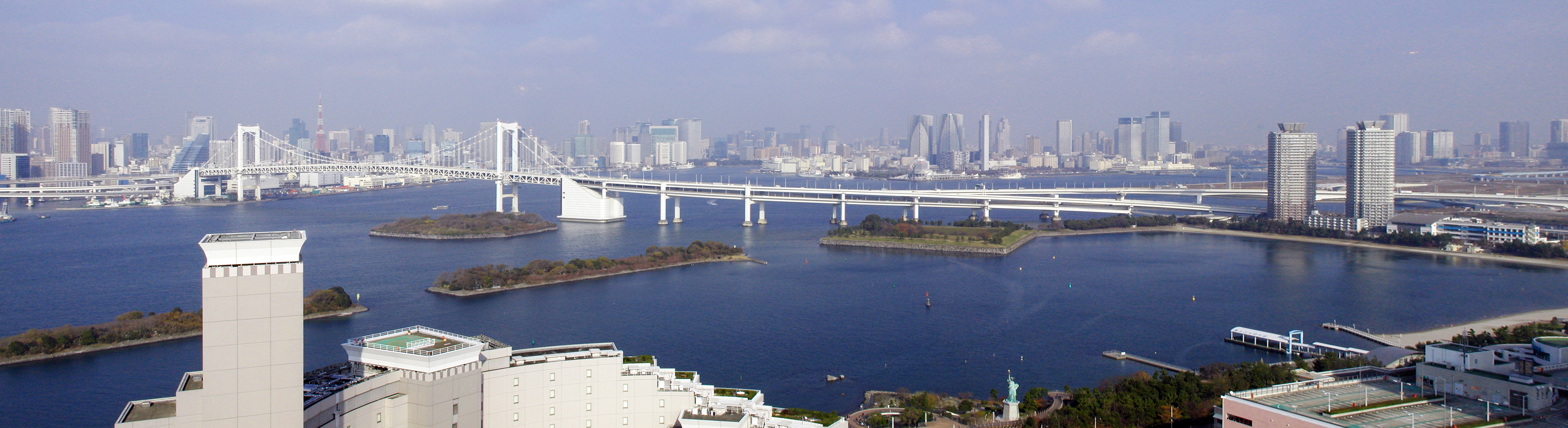
Tokyo Bay, where a number of events were held

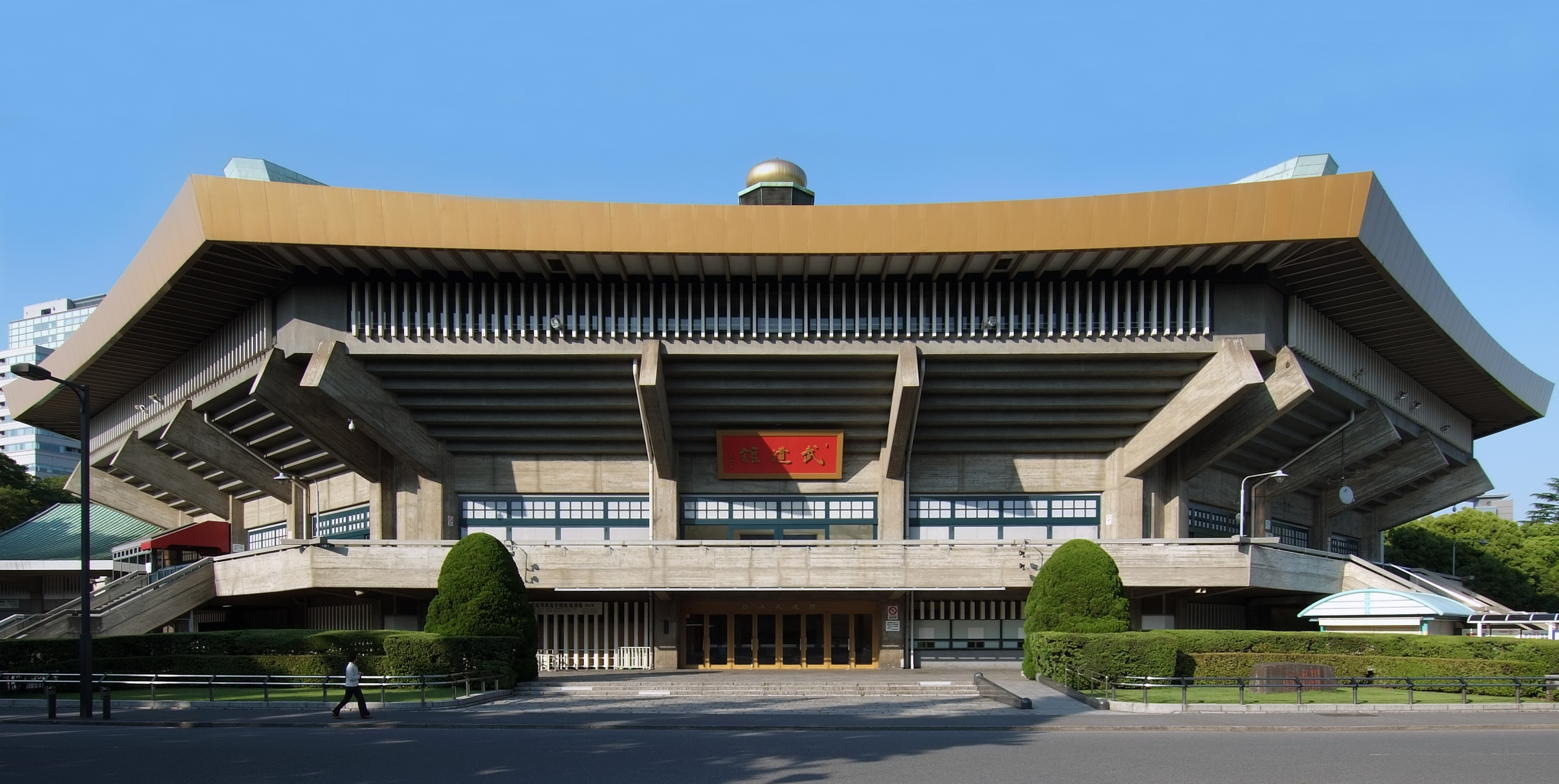
Nippon Budokan, host of the Judo event

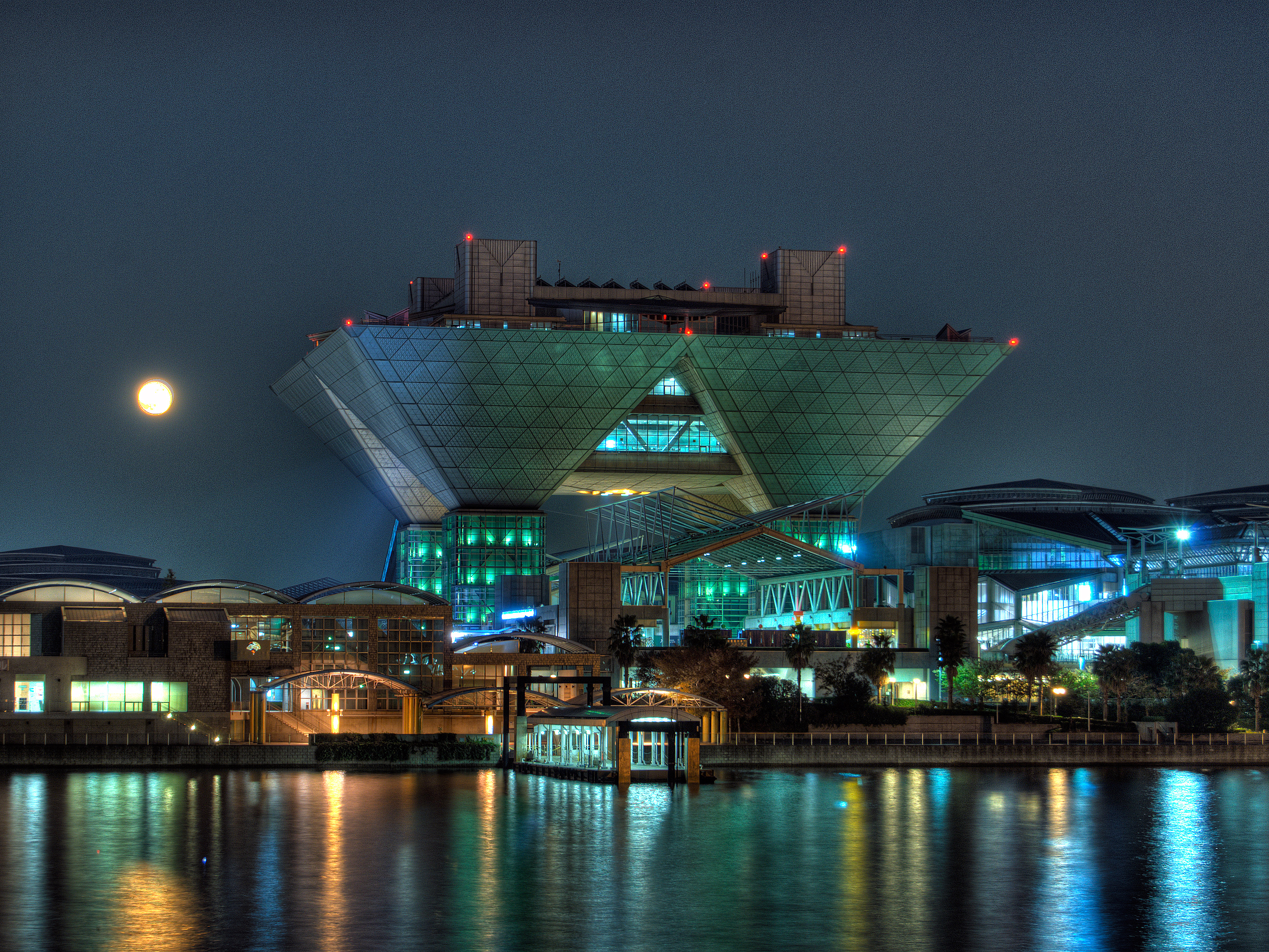
The International Broadcast and Main Press Centre

=== Heritage Zone ===
- Japan National Stadium (Olympic Stadium) – Athletics, Opening and closing ceremonies
- Nippon Budokan – Judo
- Tokyo Equestrian Park – Equestrian
- Tokyo International Forum – Powerlifting
- Tokyo Metropolitan Gymnasium – Table tennis
- Yoyogi National Stadium – Badminton, Wheelchair rugby
- Musashino Forest Sport Plaza – Wheelchair basketball (secondary venue)

=== Tokyo Bay Zone ===
- Aomi Urban Sports Venue – Football 5-a-side
- Ariake Arena – Wheelchair basketball (main venue)
- Ariake Tennis Park – Wheelchair tennis
- Dream Island Archery Park – Archery
- Makuhari Messe – Goalball, Sitting volleyball, Taekwondo, Wheelchair fencing
- Odaiba Marine Park – Triathlon
- Tokyo Aquatics Centre – Swimming
- Ariake Gymnastics Centre – Boccia
- Sea Forest Waterway – Rowing, Canoe

=== Venues outside 10 km area ===
- Asaka Shooting Range – Shooting
- Izu Velodrome – Track cycling
- Fuji Speedway – Road cycling

=== Non-competition venues ===
- Harumi Futo – Paralympic Village
- Tokyo Big Sight Conference Tower – International Media and Broadcast Centre

== Marketing ==
=== Logo ===
The emblems of the 2020 Olympics and Paralympics were unveiled on 25 April 2016. The Paralympic emblem features a hand fan in a circle form, filled with an indigo-colored checkerboard pattern. The design is meant to "express a refined elegance and sophistication that exemplifies Japan". The designs replaced a previous emblem which had been scrapped due to allegations that it plagiarized the logo of the Théâtre de Liège in Belgium. This was also the final time that the "Paralympic Games" text would be featured in a Paralympics emblem.

=== Mascot ===
Miraitowa (left), the Olympic mascot, and Someity (right), the Paralympic mascot

The shortlist of mascots for the Tokyo Games was unveiled on 7 December 2017 and the winning entry was announced on 28 February 2018. Candidate pair A, created by Ryo Taniguchi, received the most votes (109,041) and was declared the winner, defeating Kana Yano's pair B (61,423 votes) and Sanae Akimoto's pair C (35,291 votes). Someity is a figure with pink chequered patterns inspired by the Games' official logo, as well as cherry blossom flowers. It is calm but powerful, nature-loving, and it can speak to wind. Both Miraitowa and Someity were named by the Organising Committee on 22 July 2018.

=== Animated shorts ===
Japanese public broadcaster NHK commissioned a series of anime shorts in conjunction with the Games, Animation x Paralympic: Who Is Your Hero? Each short featured a different Paralympic sport, and was produced in collaboration with well-known creators of anime and manga, sometimes featuring crossovers with popular series or with real-life athletes.

== Broadcasting ==
The International Paralympic Committee anticipated that the 2020 Summer Paralympics would be seen by a global audience of at least 4.25 billion viewers, an increase over the estimated 4.1 billion of the 2016 Games. Olympic Broadcasting Services (OBS) provided live broadcasts for 19 of the 22 sports, an increase from 16 in Rio. Japanese broadcaster NHK aired coverage of selected events in 8K. In markets without and with a dedicated rightsholder, the IPC streamed the Games on its YouTube, Twitter and Facebook pages.

In the United Kingdom, these were third Summer Paralympics to be broadcast by Channel 4, which planned to air at least 300 hours of coverage on free-to-air TV (with More4 dedicated primarily to team events), 1,200 hours of coverage via streaming, as well as a highlights program and The Last Leg nightly. The broadcaster launched a trailer directed by Bradford Young entitled "Super. Human." in mid-July 2021, which aimed to focus on the "realities" of the lives of Paralympic athletes, and "the sacrifices they make in pursuit of greatness".

In the United States, NBCUniversal aired 1,200 hours of coverage on Peacock, NBCSN, and Olympic Channel, while NBC broadcast five highlights programs over the course of the Games and afterward (with three airing in primetime), which "[showcased] the incredible backstories of the athletes and teams competing in Tokyo".

Canadian media rights was once again led by the CBC, with 120 hours of television coverage, along with broadcasts by Sportsnet and AMI-tv.

In Australia, the Seven Network offered one free-to-air channel broadcast via either their Channel 7 or 7mate channels and up to 16 free streaming channels via the online 7plus service.

In New Zealand, the Games were broadcast by TVNZ Duke. TVNZ faced criticism for the scale of its coverage, including a lack of streaming coverage, and the TVNZ broadcast and OBS world feed missing coverage of events involving local athletes. On 2 September, citing the criticism, TVNZ announced that it would waive the geoblocking for the IPC's official streams on YouTube.

In India, Eurosport India and Discovery+ debuted as a new local rightsholder, focusing on coverage of events involving Indian athletes.

For the first time in Chile, the Paralympics were broadcast on TVN.

In Brazil, the Tokyo 2020 Paralympic Games were broadcast on Grupo Globo platforms Sportv, Globoplay and for the first time some events was broadcast live on Rede Globo free-to-air channel at late nights and early mornings. The games were sublicensed to a public broadcasters consortium led by TV Brasil and TV Cultura.

In Malaysia, the Tokyo 2020 Paralympic Games were broadcast on Astro Arena HD channel 801.

In Singapore, selected live events were telecast on Mediacorp Channel 5 while the rest of the coverage was streamed on meWATCH. Selected highlights also appeared on the Mediacorp Entertainment YouTube channel.

In the Philippines, the Tokyo 2020 Paralympic Games were broadcast on cable channel TAP Sports and was streamed online on TAP Go.

== Concerns and controversies ==
=== Student attendees and COVID-19 ===
Tokyo governor Yuriko Koike pressed ahead for students to be allowed to attend the Paralympics with the Paralympic organizing committee in Tokyo arguing "it's important to have students view athletes with disabilities" for their education on disability. This has been remarked on due to their being a state of emergency in Tokyo concerning the illness. Chiba Prefecture later dropped from the program due to two teachers being found to have COVID-19 infections.

=== Assault by a member of the Georgian team ===
The reigning judo paralympic champion from Georgia, Zviad Gogotchuri, was arrested after assaulting a security guard at a Tokyo hotel on 16 August 2021. The visually impaired judoka from Georgia was later ejected from the games.

=== Men's judo 81 kg ===
Japan's Aramitsu Kitazono was scheduled to compete in the round of 16 events of the men's 81 kg category. However, he was forced to withdraw at the last minute, two days before his scheduled event after sustaining injuries to his head and legs during an incident that happened on 26 August 2021 at the Paralympics Village. It was revealed Aramitsu was hit by a Toyota e-Palette driverless vehicle, which was under manual control by an operator, when he was walking on the pedestrian crossing. His opponent Dmytro Solovey of Ukraine automatically qualified to the quarterfinals as a result of Aramitsu's late withdrawal.

=== Men's shot put (F20) final ===
Malaysian shot putter (F20 class), Muhammad Ziyad Zolkefli, arrived three minutes late for the event but was cleared to compete. In this event on 31 August 2021, he originally won the gold medal in the men's shot put F20 event, thus defending his title in Rio 2016 and breaking a new world record. However, after the event had finished, his gold was stripped after a protest from the Ukrainian delegation, citing that Ziyad came late to the call room. Other than Ziyad, Australian Todd Hodgets and Ecuadorian Jordi Villalba were also disqualified from the event for 'Failure to Report to the Call Room'.

Later, Malaysian Youth and Sports Minister, Ahmad Faizal Azumu issued a statement via his Twitter account, stating that the National Paralympic Committees of Malaysia, Australia, and Ecuador has made a joint-counter protest to opposing the protest made by the Ukrainian delegation.

However, the appeal from three NPC's has been rejected, and Ukrainian Maksym Koval remains as the gold medal winner.

After the events, some social media accounts from Ukraine were spammed by "hateful" comments from Malaysians, including Ukrainian president Volodymyr Zelenskyy's Instagram account. Koval's Instagram account was also hacked by Malaysian cyber troopers due to the result. This action caused the official Facebook account of the Ukrainian Embassy in Malaysia to be deactivated, and the Embassy's official Twitter account set to private.

=== Other incidents ===
Forty officers from Yamanashi Prefectural Police, who were tasked to support local police at venues and to control traffic during the Games, were removed from duty by Tokyo Metropolitan Police Department (TMPD) and sent home following numerous incidents. This included visiting brothels, drinking in their dormitories (which is against regulations) and in bars surrounding Kinshichō Station, Sumida, which then descended into drunken brawls with civilian bystanders. That latter incident led the TMPD to intervene, which led to the officers being caught.

== See also ==
- 2020 Summer Olympics
- #WeThe15

== Notes ==
Preceded by Rio de Janeiro	Summer Paralympics; Tokyo; XVI Paralympic Summer Games (2020)	Succeeded by Paris
