= Goalball at the 2024 Summer Paralympics – Women's team rosters =

The following is a list of squads for each nation competing in goalball at the 2024 Summer Paralympics – women's tournament in Paris.

== Group A ==
=== Brazil ===
Coach: Alessandro Tosim

The following is the Brazil squad in the goalball tournament of the 2024 Summer Paralympics. The roster was announced on 25 June 2024.

No.	Player	Class	Date of birth (age)
1	Geovana Moura	B2	23 June 1999 (aged 25)
2	Gabriely Brito	B3	15 August 1990 (aged 34)
5	Moniza de Lima	B2	16 April 1998 (aged 26)
6	Kátia Silva	B1	24 April 1995 (aged 29)
7	Danielle Longhini	B1	22 February 2001 (aged 23)
8	Jéssica Vitorino	B3	22 July 1993 (aged 31)

=== China ===
Coach: Zhang Xiaopeng

The following is the China squad in the goalball tournament of the 2024 Summer Paralympics.

No.	Player	Class	Date of birth (age)
1	Zhang Xiling	B3	17 June 1998 (aged 26)
2	Cao Zhenhua	B1	23 August 1997 (aged 27)
5	Xu Miao	B3	12 October 2001 (aged 22)
6	Wang Chunyan	B2	7 December 2001 (aged 22)
7	Ke Peiying	B2	27 January 2001 (aged 23)
9	Wang Chunhua	B2	20 June 1995 (aged 29)

=== Israel ===
Coach: Raz Shoham

The following is the Israel squad in the goalball tournament of the 2024 Summer Paralympics.

No.	Player	Class	Date of birth (age)
1	Elham Mahamid Ruzin	B3	16 February 1990 (aged 34)
2	Noa Malka	B3	15 June 2003 (aged 21)
3	Gal Hamrani	B1	1 December 1992 (aged 31)
4	Or Mizrahi	B3	7 May 1993 (aged 31)
5	Roni Ohayon	B2	8 March 1999 (aged 25)
6	Lihi Ben-David	B1	8 December 1995 (aged 28)

=== Turkey ===
Coach: Gultekin Karasu

The following is the Turkey squad in the goalball tournament of the 2024 Summer Paralympics.

No.	Player	Class	Date of birth (age)
1	Fatma Gül Güler	B2	12 February 2004 (aged 20)
2	Reyhan Yılmaz	B2	18 November 2001 (aged 22)
3	Sevda Altunoluk	B2	1 April 1994 (aged 30)
4	Şeydanur Kaplan	B2	23 March 2000 (aged 24)
7	Sevtap Altunoluk	B3	1 October 1995 (aged 28)
8	Berfin Altan	B3	24 November 2003 (aged 20)

== Group B ==
=== Canada ===
Coach: Trent Farebrother

The following is the Canada squad in the goalball tournament of the 2024 Summer Paralympics.

No.	Player	Class	Date of birth (age)
1	Maryam Salehizadeh	B3	21 September 1986 (aged 37)
3	Whitney Bogart	B3	21 April 1986 (aged 38)
4	Meghan Mahon	B3	15 January 1996 (aged 28)
5	Emma Reinke	B3	22 June 1998 (aged 26)
6	Brieann Tracy Kelly Baldock	B3	14 December 1995 (aged 28)
7	Amy Burk	B3	17 March 1990 (aged 34)

=== France ===
Coach: Anthony Puaud

The following is the France squad in the goalball tournament of the 2024 Summer Paralympics.

No.	Player	Class	Date of birth (age)
3	Melda Alhan	B2	31 May 2005 (aged 19)
4	Coralie Gonzalez	B1	2 April 1988 (aged 36)
5	Adelia Ajami	B3	1 April 2003 (aged 21)
7	Gwendoline Matos	B2	29 December 1993 (aged 30)
8	Loise Rondepierre	B3	8 February 1998 (aged 26)
9	Jahmali Berquier	B2	9 January 2003 (aged 21)

=== Japan ===
Coach: Mihoko Tsuji

The following is the Japan squad in the goalball tournament of the 2024 Summer Paralympics.

No.	Player	Class	Date of birth (age)
1	Yuki Temma	B1	26 July 1990 (aged 34)
2	Minami Arai	B3	22 January 2003 (aged 21)
4	Saki Amuro	B1	5 March 1993 (aged 31)
6	Norika Hagiwara	B2	3 March 2001 (aged 23)
7	Rieko Takahashi	B1	20 March 1998 (aged 26)
9	Masae Komiya	B1	8 May 1975 (aged 49)

=== South Korea ===
Coach: Jung Eun-sun

The following is the South Korea squad in the goalball tournament of the 2024 Summer Paralympics.

No.	Player	Class	Date of birth (age)
1	Kim Hee-jin	B3	29 November 1994 (aged 29)
3	Kim Eun-ji	B2	23 April 1991 (aged 33)
4	Park Eun-ji	B1	2 June 1999 (aged 25)
6	Sim Seon-hwa	B2	2 March 1992 (aged 32)
7	Seo Min-ji	B2	29 December 2001 (aged 22)
8	Choi Eum-jee	B1	6 July 1999 (aged 25)
