= Israel at the 2020 Summer Paralympics =

- IPC code: ISR
- NPC: Israel Paralympic Committee
- Website: www.isad.org.il

in Tokyo
- Competitors: 33 (15 men and 18 women) in 11 sports
- Flag bearers: Nadav Levi; Moran Samuel
- Medals Ranked 22nd: Gold 6 Silver 2 Bronze 1 Total 9

Summer Paralympics appearances (overview)
- 1960; 1964; 1968; 1972; 1976; 1980; 1984; 1988; 1992; 1996; 2000; 2004; 2008; 2012; 2016; 2020; 2024

Israel competed at the 2020 Summer Paralympics in Tokyo from 24 August to 5 September 2021. The delegation includes 33 athletes – 18 women and 15 men – competing in 11 sports: athletics, badminton, boccia, goalball, paracanoeing, powerlifting, rowing, shooting, swimming, table tennis, and wheelchair tennis.

The Games were originally scheduled to take place between 25 August and 6 September 2020, but were postponed because of the COVID-19 pandemic. They are still being called the 2020 Summer Paralympics, even with the change in scheduling to one year later.

== Disability classifications ==
Every participant at the Paralympics has their disability grouped into one of five disability categories; amputation, the condition may be congenital or sustained through injury or illness; cerebral palsy; wheelchair athletes, there is often overlap between this and other categories; visual impairment, including blindness; Les autres, any physical disability that does not fall strictly under one of the other categories, for example dwarfism or multiple sclerosis. Each Paralympic sport then has its own classifications, dependent upon the specific physical demands of competition. Events are given a code, made of numbers and letters, describing the type of event and classification of the athletes competing. Some sports, such as athletics, divide athletes by both the category and severity of their disabilities, other sports, for example swimming, group competitors from different categories together, the only separation being based on the severity of the disability.

== Medalists ==
| Medal | Name | Sport | Event | Date |
|---|---|---|---|---|
| Gold | Iyad Shalabi | Swimming | Men's 100 m backstroke S1 | 25 August |
| Gold | Mark Malyar | Swimming | Men's 200 m individual medley SM7 | 27 August |
| Gold | Mark Malyar | Swimming | Men's 400 m freestyle S7 | 29 August |
| Gold | Ami Omer Dadaon | Swimming | Men's 200 m freestyle S4 | 30 August |
| Gold | Iyad Shalabi | Swimming | Men's 50 metre backstroke S1 | 2 September |
| Gold | Ami Omer Dadaon | Swimming | Men's 50 m freestyle S4 | 2 September |
| Silver | Ami Omer Dadaon | Swimming | Men's 150 m individual medley SM4 | 28 August |
| Silver | Moran Samuel | Rowing | Woman's single sculls | 29 August |
| Bronze | Mark Malyar | Swimming | Men's 100 m backstroke S7 | 30 August |

== Competitors ==
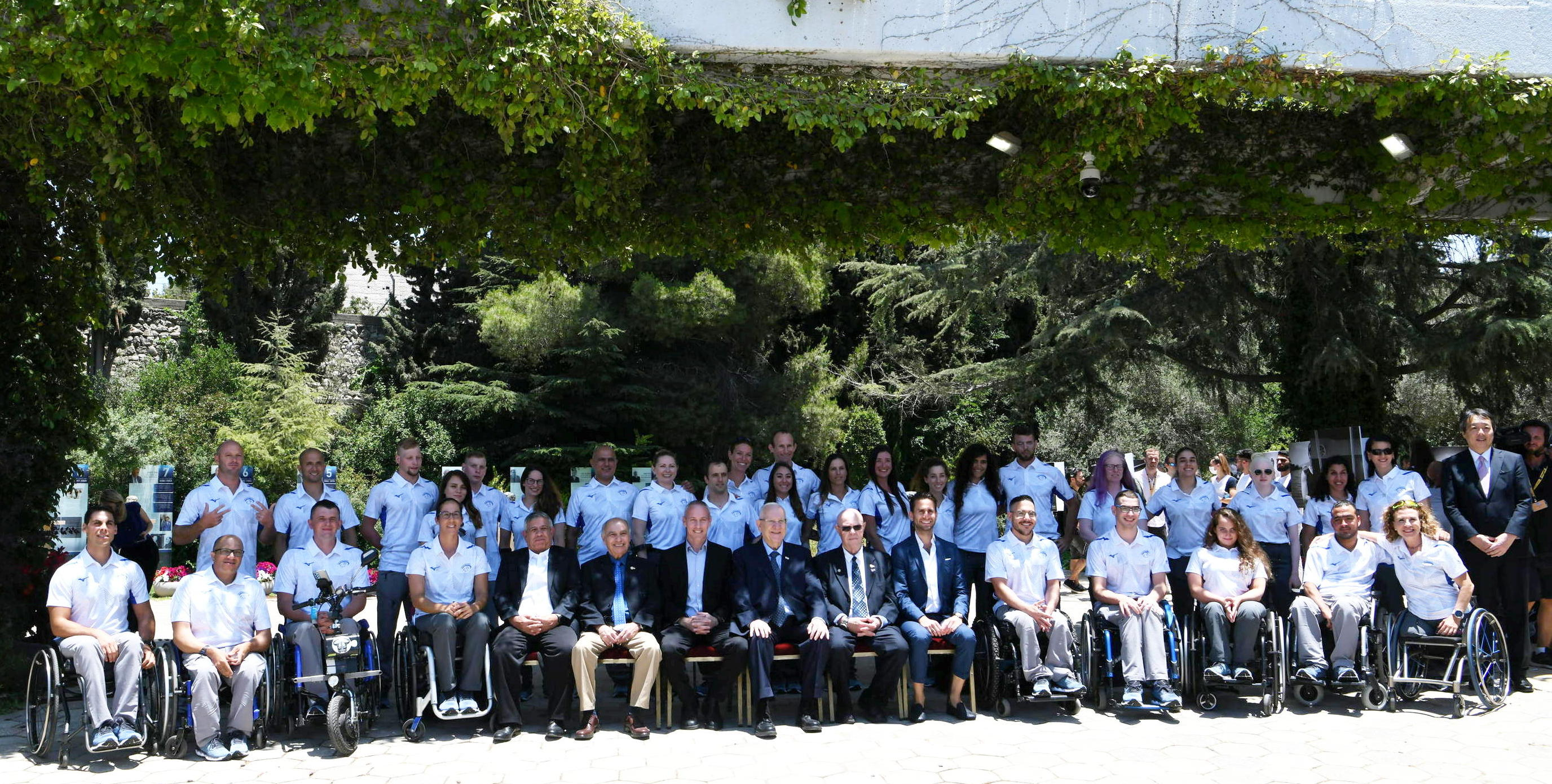
Israel's Paralympic delegation meeting with the President of Israel, Reuven Rivlin, prior to the games.

The Israeli delegation includes 33 athletes, competing in 11 sports.

| Sport | Men | Women | Total |
|---|---|---|---|
| Athletics | 1 | 0 | 1 |
| Badminton | 0 | 1 | 1 |
| Boccia | 1 | 0 | 1 |
| Goalball | 0 | 6 | 6 |
| Paracanoeing | 0 | 1 | 1 |
| Powerlifting | 0 | 1 | 1 |
| Rowing | 3 | 4 | 7 |
| Shooting | 1 | 1 | 2 |
| Swimming | 5 | 3 | 8 |
| Table tennis | 0 | 1 | 1 |
| Wheelchair tennis | 4 | 0 | 4 |
| Total | 15 | 18 | 33 |

== Athletics ==
Field events

| Athlete | Event | Final | |
| Athlete | Event | Distance | Position |
|---|---|---|---|
| Oleksandr Aliekseienko | Men's shot put F34 | 9.66 SB | 9 |

== Badminton ==
| Athlete | Event | Group Stage | | | | Quarterfinal | Semifinal | Final / BM | |
| Athlete | Event | Opposition Score | Opposition Score | Opposition Score | Rank | Opposition Score | Opposition Score | Opposition Score | Rank |
|---|---|---|---|---|---|---|---|---|---|
| Nina Gorogetzky | Women's singles WH1 | Zhang (CHN); L (11–21, 12–21) | Pookkham (THA); L (4–21, 9–21) | Mathez (SUI); L (15–21, 10–21) | 4 | Did not advance | | | 7 |

== Boccia ==
Nadav Levi get a ticket for Israel in Individual BC2 events.

Individual

| Athlete | Event | Preliminaries | | | | Quarterfinals | Semifinals | Final/BM | Rank |
| Athlete | Event | Opposition Score | Opposition Score | Opposition Score | Rank | Opposition Score | Opposition Score | Opposition Score | Rank |
|---|---|---|---|---|---|---|---|---|---|
| Nadav Levi | Mixed individual BC2 | de Faria (BRA); W 8–0 | Fernandes (POR); W 5–2 | Vongsa (THA); L 0–10 | 2 | did not advance | | | 11 |

== Goalball ==
=== Women's tournament ===
The Israeli women team qualified for the Paralympic Gamess through the 2019 European Championships on 13 October 2019. The following is the Israel roster in the women's goalball tournament of the 2020 Summer Paralympics.

| No. | Player | Class | Date of birth (age) |
|---|---|---|---|
| 1 | Elham Mahamid | B3 | 16 February 1990 (aged 31) |
| 2 | Noa Malka | B3 | 15 June 2003 (aged 18) |
| 3 | Gal Hamrani | B1 | 1 December 1992 (aged 28) |
| 4 | Or Mizrahi | B3 | 7 May 1993 (aged 28) |
| 5 | Roni Ohayon | B2 | 8 March 1999 (aged 22) |
| 6 | Lihi Ben-David | B1 | 8 December 1995 (aged 25) |

Group stage

| Pos | Team | Pld | W | D | L | GF | GA | GD | Pts | Qualification |
|---|---|---|---|---|---|---|---|---|---|---|
| 1 | China | 4 | 3 | 0 | 1 | 17 | 7 | +10 | 9 | Quarterfinals |
| 2 | Israel | 4 | 2 | 0 | 2 | 22 | 14 | +8 | 6 | Quarterfinals |
| 3 | RPC | 4 | 2 | 0 | 2 | 13 | 16 | −3 | 6 | Quarterfinals |
| 4 | Australia | 4 | 2 | 0 | 2 | 9 | 21 | −12 | 6 | Quarterfinals |
| 5 | Canada | 4 | 1 | 0 | 3 | 12 | 15 | −3 | 3 | |

Source: TOCOG
Rules for classification: 1) points; 2) goal difference; 3) number of wins; 4) goals against; 5) head-to-head goal difference.
25 August 2021
19:00

| Israel | 11–1 | Australia |
|---|---|---|
| Mizrahi 1'; Ben-David 2', 2', 5', 7', 7', 14', 16'; Mahamid 18', 18' | Report | Horsburgh 10' |

Makuhari Messe, Tokyo
Referee: Raili Sipura (Finland), Launel Scott (Canada)

26 August 2021
20:30

| Canada | 6–2 | Israel |
|---|---|---|
| Reinke 9', 13', 14', 16'; Salehizadeh 18', 22' | Report | Mizrahi 18'; Ben-David 23' |

Makuhari Messe, Tokyo
Referee: Bas Spaans (Netherlands), Romualdas Vaitiekus (Lithuania)

28 August 2021
17:30

| RPC | 3–8 | Israel |
|---|---|---|
| Arestova 9', 20'; Chudina 16' | Report | Mahamid 1', 1'; Mizrahi 2', 3'; Ben-David 16', 19', 24', 24' |

Makuhari Messe, Tokyo
Referee: Robert Avery (Great Britain), Romualdas Vaitiekus (Lithuania)

29 August 2021
14:45

| Israel | 1–4 | China |
|---|---|---|
| Ben-David 5' | Report | Zhang Xiling 6', 6', 15'; Cao Zhenhua 24' |

Makuhari Messe, Tokyo
Referee: Raili Sipura (Finland), Raquel Aguado Gómez (Spain)

Quarterfinal

1 September 2021
15:00

| Israel | 1–4 | Japan |
|---|---|---|
| Mahamid 13' | Report | Hagiwara 4', 5', 12', 23' |

Makuhari Messe, Tokyo
Referee: Raquel Aguado Gómez (Spain), Warrick Jackes (Australia)

== Paracanoeing ==
Israel has qualified one athlete in Women's KL2 events.

| Athlete | Event | Heats | | Semifinal | | Final | |
| Athlete | Event | Time | Rank | Time | Rank | Time | Rank |
|---|---|---|---|---|---|---|---|
| Pascale Bercovitch | Women's KL2 | 1:02.291 | 5 SF | 1:00.366 | 5 FB | 58.123 | 10 |

Qualification Legend: FA=Final A (medal); FB=Final B (non-medal); SF=semifinal

== Powerlifting ==
| Athlete | Event | Total lifted | Rank |
|---|---|---|---|
| Polina Katsman | Women's +86 kg | 123 | 7 |

== Rowing ==
Israel qualified three boats for each of the following rowing classes into the Paralympic regatta. All of them qualified after successfully entering the top seven for men's and women's single sculls and top eight for mixed coxed four at the 2019 World Rowing Championships in Ottensheim, Austria.

| Athlete | Event | Heats | | Repechage | | Final | |
| Athlete | Event | Time | Rank | Time | Rank | Time | Rank |
|---|---|---|---|---|---|---|---|
| Shmulik Daniel | Men's single sculls | 10:22.90 | 3 R | 9:28.78 | 2 FA | 10:23.02 | 6 |
| Moran Samuel | Women's single sculls | REL | | 10:33.34 PB | 1 FA | 11:18.39 | 2nd place, silver medalist(s) |
| Simona Goren; Ahijah Klein; Barak Hatzor; Michal Feinblatt; Marlaina Miller | Mixed coxed four | 7:38.95 | 3 R | 7:09.59 | 2 FA | 7:51.42 | 6 |

Qualification Legend: FA=Final A (medal); FB=Final B (non-medal); R=Repechage

== Shooting ==
Israel paralympic shooter, Doron Shaziri earned a quate for Israel after he won a silver medal in the R7 - Men's 50m Rifle 3 Positions event at the 2018 World Shooting Para Sport World Cup. Yuliya Chernoy earned a quate for Israel after she won a bronze medal in the R6 - Mixed 50m Rifle Prone SH1 event at the 2019 World Shooting Para Sport Championships.

| Athlete | Event | Qualification | | Final | |
| Athlete | Event | Score | Rank | Score | Rank |
|---|---|---|---|---|---|
| Doron Shaziri | Men's 50m rifle 3 positions SH1 | 1150 | 10 | did not advance | |
| Doron Shaziri | Mixed 50m rifle prone SH1 | 613.5 | 21 | did not advance | |
| Yuliya Chernoy | Mixed 50m rifle prone SH1 | 616.3 | 10 | did not advance | |
| Yuliya Chernoy | Mixed 10m air rifle prone SH1 | 631.8 | 14 | did not advance | |

== Swimming ==
Israel have qualified two quota in Swimming at the 2019 World Para Swimming Championships after Mark Malyar won a gold medal at the 400 meter freestyle swim in the S7 disability class and set a new world record (4:33 minutes) and Ami Omer Dadaon won a silver medal. Israel qualified another six quota after achieving the MQS.

Israel won eight medals in swimming events, and for the first time in the Paralympics, Israeli swimmers won gold medals. Two golds and one bronze medal were won by Mark Malyar and he set two new world records, in the men’s 200-meter individual medley and the 400m freestyle S7. Iyad Shalabi, in his fourth appearance at the Paralympics, became the first Arab-Israeli to win a medal in the Olympics or Paralympics for Israel, winning two gold medals. Ami Omer Dadaon won three medals, two gold and one silver, and set a Paralympic record in the men’s 50-meter freestyle S4 category and a world record in the 200m freestyle S4.

Men

| Athlete | Event | Heats | | Final | |
| Athlete | Event | Result | Rank | Result | Rank |
|---|---|---|---|---|---|
| Ami Omer Dadaon | 50m freestyle S4 | 38.42 | 2 Q | 37.21 PR | 1st place, gold medalist(s) |
| Ami Omer Dadaon | 50m backstroke S4 | 48.28 | 9 | did not advance | |
| Ami Omer Dadaon | 100m freestyle S4 | DSQ | | did not advance | |
| Ami Omer Dadaon | 150m individual medley SM4 | 2:33.92 | 2 Q | 2:29.48 | 2nd place, silver medalist(s) |
| Ami Omer Dadaon | 200m freestyle S4 | 2:56.66 | 1 Q | 2:44.84 WR | 1st place, gold medalist(s) |
| Bashar Halabi | 100m breaststroke SB4 | 2:37.37 | 13 | did not advance | |
| Ariel Malyar | 50m freestyle S4 | 40.48 | 6 Q | 41.70 | 7 |
| Ariel Malyar | 50m backstroke S4 | 58.81 | 15 | did not advance | |
| Ariel Malyar | 100m freestyle S4 | 1:36.04 | 9 | did not advance | |
| Ariel Malyar | 200m freestyle S4 | 3:38.51 | 13 | did not advance | |
| Mark Malyar | 50m freestyle S7 | 28.57 | 5 Q | 28.49 | 6 |
| Mark Malyar | 50m butterfly S7 | 33.90 | 12 | did not advance | |
| Mark Malyar | 100m backstroke S7 | 1:11.92 | 4 Q | 1:10.08 | 3rd place, bronze medalist(s) |
| Mark Malyar | 200m individual medley SM7 | 2:32.86 | 1 Q | 2:29.01 WR | 1st place, gold medalist(s) |
| Mark Malyar | 400m freestyle S7 | 4:41.82 PR | 1 Q | 4:31.06 WR | 1st place, gold medalist(s) |
| Iyad Shalabi | 50m backstroke S1 | —N/a | | 1:11.79 | 1st place, gold medalist(s) |
| Iyad Shalabi | 100m backstroke S1 | —N/a | | 2:28.04 | 1st place, gold medalist(s) |
| Iyad Shalabi | 150m individual medley SM3 | 4:52.88 WR (Note: The world record is for the SM1 classification) | 12 | did not advance | |

Notes:

Women

| Athletes | Event | Heat | | Final | |
| Athletes | Event | Time | Rank | Time | Rank |
|---|---|---|---|---|---|
| Yuliya Gordiychuk | 100m butterfly S9 | 1:13.08 | 6 Q | 1:13.35 | 7 |
| Yuliya Gordiychuk | 200m individual medley SM9 | 2:52.48 | 12 | did not advance | |
| Yuliya Gordiychuk | 400m freestyle S9 | 4:58.40 | 10 | did not advance | |
| Veronika Guirenko | 50m backstroke S3 | 1:11.78 | 10 | did not advance | |
| Veronika Guirenko | 50m breaststroke SB3 | 1:22.17 | 14 | did not advance | |
| Veronika Guirenko | 100m freestyle S3 | 2:37.00 | 11 | did not advance | |
| Veronika Guirenko | 150m individual medley SM4 | 4:32.00 | 16 | did not advance | |
| Erel Halevi | 100m freestyle S7 | 1:20.08 | 13 | did not advance | |
| Erel Halevi | 100m backstroke S7 | —N/a | | 1:40.68 | 6 |
| Erel Halevi | 400m freestyle S7 | —N/a | | 5:44.97 | 7 |

== Table tennis ==
Israel entered one athlete into the table tennis competition at the games by the Bipartite Commission Invitation.

Women

| Athlete | Event | Group Stage | | | Quarterfinals | Semifinals | Final | |
| Athlete | Event | Opposition Result | Opposition Result | Rank | Opposition Result | Opposition Result | Opposition Result | Rank |
|---|---|---|---|---|---|---|---|---|
| Caroline Tabib | Individual C5 | Abuawad (JOR); W 3–1 | Sringam (THA); L 0–3 | 3 | did not advance | | | |

== Wheelchair tennis ==
Israel qualified four players entries for wheelchair tennis. Two of them qualified by the world rankings, while two of them qualified by receiving bipartite commission invitation allocation quotas.

Men

| Athlete (seed) | Event | Round of 64 | Round of 32 | Round of 16 | Quarterfinals | Semifinals | Final / BM | |
| Athlete (seed) | Event | Opposition Score | Opposition Score | Opposition Score | Opposition Score | Opposition Score | Opposition Score | Rank |
|---|---|---|---|---|---|---|---|---|
| Adam Berdiczewski | Men's singles | Weekes (AUS); L 0-2 (4-6, 2-6) | did not advance | | | | | 33 |
| Guy Sasson | Men's singles | Arai (JPN); L 0-2 (1-6, 1-6) | did not advance | | | | | 33 |
| Adam Berdiczewski; Guy Sasson | Men's doubles | —N/a | Medeiros / Pommê (BRA); W 2-0 (6-1, 2-0^{R}) | Egberink / Scheffers (NED); L 0-2 (1-6, 1-6) | did not advance | | | 9 |
| Yossi Saadon | Quad singles | —N/a | | Schröder (NED); L 0-2 (1-6, 2-6) | did not advance | | | 9 |
| Shraga Weinberg | Quad singles | —N/a | | Vink (NED); L 0-2 (0-6, 3-6) | did not advance | | | 9 |
| Yossi Saadon; Shraga Weinberg | Quad doubles | —N/a | | | Moroishi / Sugeno (JPN); L 0-2 (5-7, 2-6) | did not advance | | 5 |

== See also ==
- Israel at the Paralympics
- Israel at the 2020 Summer Olympics
