= Goalball at the 2020 Summer Paralympics – Women's tournament =

Women's goalball at the XVI Paralympic Games

Tournament details
- Host country: Japan
- Venue(s): 1 (in 1 host city)
- Dates: 25 August – 3 September 2021
- Teams: 10

Final positions
- Champions: Turkey (2nd title)
- Runners-up: United States
- Third place: Japan
- Fourth place: Brazil

Tournament statistics
- Matches played: 28
- Goals scored: 239 (8.54 per match)
- Top scorer(s): (Turkey) Sevda Altunoluk (46 goals)

The goalball women's tournament was contested from 25 August to 3 September. There were ten teams consisting of six players split into two groups: Group C and Group D.

Turkey were the defending Paralympic champions. They successfully defended their title by beating the United States in the gold medal match.

== Participating teams ==
Group C

- Australia
- Canada
- China
- Israel
- RPC

Group D

- Brazil
- Egypt
- Japan
- Turkey
- United States

== Preliminary round ==
=== Group C ===
Pos	Team	Pld	W	D	L	GF	GA	GD	Pts	Qualification
1	China	4	3	0	1	17	7	+10	9	Quarterfinals
2	Israel	4	2	0	2	22	14	+8	6	Quarterfinals
3	RPC	4	2	0	2	13	16	−3	6	Quarterfinals
4	Australia	4	2	0	2	9	21	−12	6	Quarterfinals
5	Canada	4	1	0	3	12	15	−3	3	

Source: TOCOG
Rules for classification: 1) points; 2) goal difference; 3) number of wins; 4) goals against; 5) head-to-head goal difference.
25 August 2021
10:30

RPC	5–1	Canada
Gerasimova 1'; Arestova 2', 9', 16'; Chudina 23'	Report	Reinke 23'

Makuhari Messe, Tokyo
Referee: Vaida Pokvytytė (Lithuania), Yoshinori Nii (Japan)

25 August 2021
19:00

Israel	11–1	Australia
Mizrahi 1'; Ben-David 2', 2', 5', 7', 7', 14', 16'; Mahamid 18', 18'	Report	Horsburgh 10'

Makuhari Messe, Tokyo
Referee: Raili Sipura (Finland), Launel Scott (Canada)

26 August 2021
10:30

China	3–4	RPC
Cao Zhenhua 3', 10'; Chen Fengqing 24'	Report	Arestova 3', 4', 12'; Gerasimova 3'

Makuhari Messe, Tokyo
Referee: Romualdas Vaitiekus (Lithuania), Launel Scott (Canada)

26 August 2021
20:30

Canada	6–2	Israel
Reinke 9', 13', 14', 16'; Salehizadeh 18', 22'	Report	Mizrahi 18'; Ben-David 23'

Makuhari Messe, Tokyo
Referee: Bas Spaans (Netherlands), Romualdas Vaitiekus (Lithuania)

27 August 2021
14:45

Australia	0–6	China
	Report	Cao Zhenhua 9', 16'; Chen Fengqing 13'; Zhang Xiling 15', 21', 22'

Makuhari Messe, Tokyo
Referee: Launel Scott (Canada), Raili Sipura (Finland)

28 August 2021
09:00

Canada	3–4	Australia
Salehizadeh 16'; Reinke 24', 24'	Report	Horsburgh 12', 18', 19', 23'

Makuhari Messe, Tokyo
Referee: Raili Sipura (Finland), Reza Dehghan (Iran)

28 August 2021
17:30

RPC	3–8	Israel
Arestova 9', 20'; Chudina 16'	Report	Mahamid 1', 1'; Mizrahi 2', 3'; Ben-David 16', 19', 24', 24'

Makuhari Messe, Tokyo
Referee: Robert Avery (Great Britain), Romualdas Vaitiekus (Lithuania)

29 August 2021
14:45

Israel	1–4	China
Ben-David 5'	Report	Zhang Xiling 6', 6', 15'; Cao Zhenhua 24'

Makuhari Messe, Tokyo
Referee: Raili Sipura (Finland), Raquel Aguado Gómez (Spain)

29 August 2021
19:00

Australia	4–1	RPC
Horsburgh 1', 5', 19'; Smith 9'	Report	Arestova 19'

Makuhari Messe, Tokyo
Referee: Bas Spaans (Netherlands), Vaida Pokvytytė (Lithuania)

30 August 2021
14:45

China	4–2	Canada
Chen Fengqing 2'; Zhang Xiling 3', 4', 22'	Report	Reinke 16'; Burk 18'

Makuhari Messe, Tokyo
Referee: Vaida Pokvytytė (Lithuania), Raili Sipura (Finland)

=== Group D ===
Pos	Team	Pld	W	D	L	GF	GA	GD	Pts	Qualification
1	Turkey	4	3	0	1	30	11	+19	9	Quarterfinals
2	United States	4	3	0	1	22	10	+12	9	Quarterfinals
3	Japan (H)	4	2	1	1	18	13	+5	7	Quarterfinals
4	Brazil	4	1	1	2	23	19	+4	4	Quarterfinals
5	Egypt	4	0	0	4	3	43	−40	0	

Source: TOCOG
Rules for classification: 1) points; 2) goal difference; 3) number of wins; 4) goals against; 5) head-to-head goal difference.
(H) Hosts
25 August 2021
14:45

Turkey	7–1	Japan
Sevd. Altunoluk 3', 11', 17', 21'; Güler 5', 20'; Yilmaz 21'	Report	Hagiwara 5'

Makuhari Messe, Tokyo
Referee: Svitlana Moroz (Ukraine), Raquel Aguado Gómez (Spain)

25 August 2021
20:30

Brazil	4–6	United States
Custodio 1'; Amorim 9'; Gomes 16', 19'	Report	Czechowski 2'; Dennis 2', 14', 21'; Mason 5', 8'

Makuhari Messe, Tokyo
Referee: Warrick Jackes (Australia), Vaida Pokvytytė (Lithuania)

26 August 2021; 14:45	Egypt	2–12	Turkey	Makuhari Messe, Tokyo; Referees: Raquel Gomez Aguado (Spain), Raili Sipura (Finland)
26 August 2021; 14:45	Elgabry 1 Ezzeldin 1	Report	Sevd. Altunoluk 8 Sevt. Altunoluk 2 Güler 1 Çelik 1	Makuhari Messe, Tokyo; Referees: Raquel Gomez Aguado (Spain), Raili Sipura (Finland)

27 August 2021
10:30

Japan	4–4	Brazil
Temma 1'; Hagiwara 7', 10', 16'	Report	Custodio 14', 21'; Amorim 16', 21'

Makuhari Messe, Tokyo
Referee: Raquel Aguado Gómez (Spain), Svitlana Moroz (Ukraine)

27 August 2021
19:00

United States	10–0	Egypt
Dennis 1', 4', 5', 6'; Czechowski 5', 12'; Mason 7', 8'; Miller 11', 15'	Report

Makuhari Messe, Tokyo
Referee: Vaida Pokvytytė (Lithuania), Bas Spaans (Netherlands)

28 August 2021
13:15

Japan	3–2	United States
Hagiwara 8', 11'; Wakasugi 17'	Report	Dennis 8', 19'

Makuhari Messe, Tokyo
Referee: Launel Scott (Canada), Woradet Kultawongwattana (Thailand)

28 August 2021
20:30

Turkey	8–4	Brazil
Sevd. Altunoluk 1', 1', 5', 16', 17', 23'; Güler 2', 3'	Report	Amorim 6', 10'; Custodio 13', 15'

Makuhari Messe, Tokyo
Referee: Svitlana Moroz (Ukraine), Raili Sipura (Finland)

29 August 2021
10:30

Egypt	0–10	Japan
	Report	Hagiwara 1', 1', 5', 6', 7', 8', 8'; Kakehata 1', 6', 7'

Makuhari Messe, Tokyo
Referee: Woradet Kultawongwattana (Thailand), Svitlana Moroz (Ukraine)

30 August 2021
10:30

Brazil	11–1	Egypt
Gomes 1', 6', 7', 9', 11', 12', 15', 16'; Ferreira 13', 14'; Custodio 15'	Report	Elgabry 12'

Makuhari Messe, Tokyo
Referee: Launel Scott (Canada), Woradet Kultawongwattana (Thailand)

30 August 2021
19:00

United States	4–3	Turkey
Mason 8'; Miller 11'; Dennis 13', 22'	Report	Sevd. Altunoluk 1', 4', 9'

Makuhari Messe, Tokyo
Referee: Raquel Aguado Gómez (Spain), Svitlana Moroz (Ukraine)

== Knockout stage ==
=== Bracket ===
Quarterfinals
1 September
China	0
Brazil (2OT)	1
1 September
United States	5
RPC	3
1 September
Turkey	10
Australia	6
1 September
Israel	1
Japan	4

Semifinals
2 September
Brazil	4
United States (ET)	5
2 September
Turkey	8
Japan	5

Gold medal match
3 September
United States	2
Turkey	9
Bronze medal match
3 September
Brazil	1
Japan	6

=== Quarterfinals ===
1 September 2021
13:15

Turkey	10–6	Australia
Sevd. Altunoluk 1', 3', 4', 6', 6', 9', 17', 17'; Güler 5'; Çelik 24'	Report	Horsburgh 2', 11', 20', 21', 24'; Smith 5'

Makuhari Messe, Tokyo
Referee: Woradet Kultawongwattana (Thailand), Launel Scott (Canada)

1 September 2021
15:00

Israel	1–4	Japan
Mahamid 13'	Report	Hagiwara 4', 5', 12', 23'

Makuhari Messe, Tokyo
Referee: Raquel Aguado Gómez (Spain), Warrick Jackes (Australia)

1 September 2021
17:45

China	0–1 (2OT)	Brazil
	Report	Custodio 28'

Makuhari Messe, Tokyo
Referee: Yoshinori Nii (Japan), Reza Dehghan (Iran)

1 September 2021
19:30

United States	5–3	RPC
Mason 4', 8', 19'; Dennis 14', 19'	Report	Arestova 2', 7', 9'

Makuhari Messe, Tokyo
Referee: Romualdas Vaitiekus (Lithuania), Robert Avery (Great Britain)

=== Semi-finals ===
2 September 2021
15:00

Turkey	8–5	Japan
Sevd. Altunoluk 2', 3', 8', 10', 18', 18', 22', 23'	Report	Hagiwara 1', 1', 8', 18', 19'

Makuhari Messe, Tokyo
Referee: Raili Sipura (Finland), Romualdas Vaitiekus (Lithuania)

2 September 2021
19:30

Brazil	4–5 (ET)	United States
Gomes 7', 9'; Custodio 1 ET; Aparecida de Lima 1 ET	Report	Dennis 22', 24', 1 ET; Czechowski 1 ET; Mason 1 ET

Makuhari Messe, Tokyo
Referee: Vaida Pokvytytė (Lithuania), Robert Avery (Great Britain)

=== Bronze medal match ===
3 September 2021
13:15

Brazil	1–6	Japan
Amorim 22'	Report	Kakehata 2', 4', 12'; Hagiwara 4', 10', 20'

Makuhari Messe, Tokyo
Referee: Vaida Pokvytytė (Lithuania), Raili Sipura (Finland)

=== Gold medal match ===
3 September 2021
17:45

United States	2–9	Turkey
Mason 9'; Miller 22'	Report	Sevd. Altunoluk 1', 1', 5', 6', 6', 8', 18', 18', 20'

Makuhari Messe, Tokyo
Referee: Raquel Aguado Gómez (Spain), Svitlana Moroz (Ukraine)

== Final ranking ==
Rank	Team
1st place, gold medalist(s)	Turkey
2nd place, silver medalist(s)	United States
3rd place, bronze medalist(s)	Japan
4	Brazil
5	China
6	Israel
7	RPC
8	Australia
9	Canada
10	Egypt
