= Russia women's national goalball team =

Russian national team, for the Paralympic sport of goalball

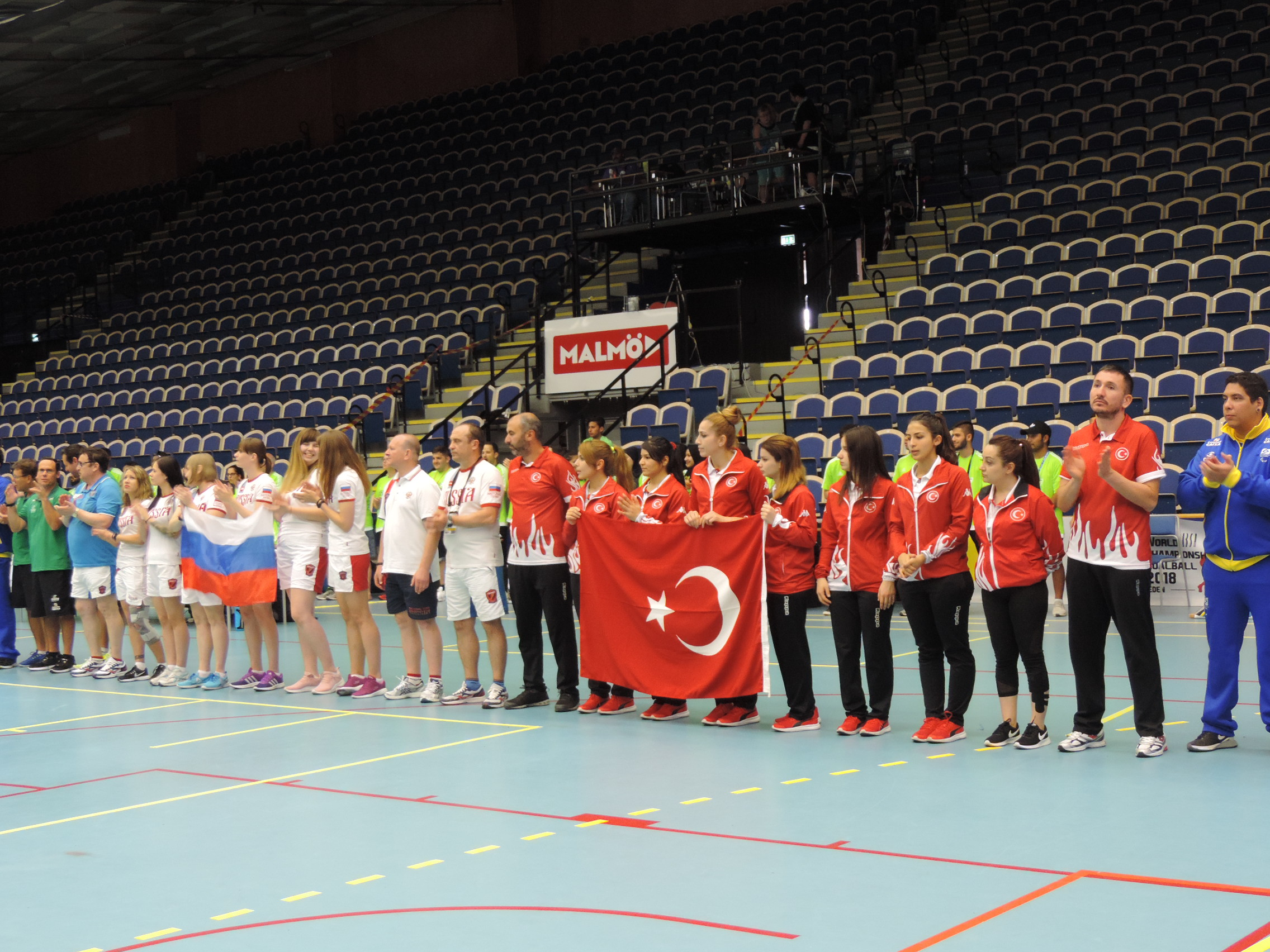
- Finalists of the women's division of the World Goalball Championships, Malmö, Sweden (2018). Russia in white.
- Full name: Женская сборная команда России по голболу
- Sport: Goalball
- League: IBSA
- Division: Women
- Region: IBSA Europe
- Location: Russia
- Colours: White, Red, Blue
- Championships: World: (gold) 2018; (silver) 2014; European: (gold) 2013, 2017; (silver) 2015
- Parent group: Russian Paralympic Committee
- Website: paralymp.ru/en/

Russia women's national goalball team is the women's national team of Russia. It takes part in international goalball competitions. Goalball is a team sport designed specifically for athletes with a vision impairment.

== Paralympic Games ==
The team did not compete in the 2012 London Paralympic Games.

=== 2016 Rio de Janeiro ===
The team was to compete in the 2016 Summer Paralympics, from 7 to 18 September 2016, in Rio de Janeiro, Brazil.

The team qualified for Rio 2016 after finishing second at the 2014 World Championships. After the Russia nation was disqualified from participation in the Games, their spot was re-allocated to Australia.

=== 2020 Tokyo ===
On 17 December 2020 the Court of Arbitration for Sport (CAS) decision involving the World Anti-Doping Agency and Russia's participation determined those athletes not implicated in doping or covering up positive tests may still be allowed to compete, but not under the Russian Federation flag. The Russia women's national goalball team, who secured a Tokyo 2020 Paralympic Games position through first place in the women's category of the 2018 World Championships, who may otherwise have competed as a 'neutral team' (EUN), will be known as the 'Russian Paralympic Committee' (RPC) at the Tokyo 2020 Paralympic Games.

The following is the RPC roster in the women's goalball tournament of the 2020 Summer Paralympics.

No.	Player	Class	Date of birth (age)
1	Arina Gerasimova	B3	7 January 1998 (aged 23)
2	Evengiia Semina	B2	16 April 1994 (aged 27)
5	Anastasiia Mazur	B3	28 June 1990 (aged 31)
7	Irina Arestova	B3	14 September 1995 (aged 25)
8	Iuliia Khrapkova	B3	18 June 1996 (aged 25)
9	Anastasiia Chudina	B3	8 January 1994 (aged 27)

Pos	Team	Pld	W	D	L	GF	GA	GD	Pts	Qualification
1	China	4	3	0	1	17	7	+10	9	Quarterfinals
2	Israel	4	2	0	2	22	14	+8	6	Quarterfinals
3	RPC	4	2	0	2	13	16	−3	6	Quarterfinals
4	Australia	4	2	0	2	9	21	−12	6	Quarterfinals
5	Canada	4	1	0	3	12	15	−3	3	

Source: TOCOG
Rules for classification: 1) points; 2) goal difference; 3) number of wins; 4) goals against; 5) head-to-head goal difference.

Round-robin

25 August 2021
10:30

RPC	5–1	Canada
Gerasimova 1'; Arestova 2', 9', 16'; Chudina 23'	Report	Reinke 23'

Makuhari Messe, Tokyo
Referee: Vaida Pokvytytė (Lithuania), Yoshinori Nii (Japan)

26 August 2021
10:30

China	3–4	RPC
Cao Zhenhua 3', 10'; Chen Fengqing 24'	Report	Arestova 3', 4', 12'; Gerasimova 3'

Makuhari Messe, Tokyo
Referee: Romualdas Vaitiekus (Lithuania), Launel Scott (Canada)

28 August 2021
17:30

RPC	3–8	Israel
Arestova 9', 20'; Chudina 16'	Report	Mahamid 1', 1'; Mizrahi 2', 3'; Ben-David 16', 19', 24', 24'

Makuhari Messe, Tokyo
Referee: Robert Avery (Great Britain), Romualdas Vaitiekus (Lithuania)

29 August 2021
19:00

Australia	4–1	RPC
Horsburgh 1', 5', 19'; Smith 9'	Report	Arestova 19'

Makuhari Messe, Tokyo
Referee: Bas Spaans (Netherlands), Vaida Pokvytytė (Lithuania)

== World Championships ==
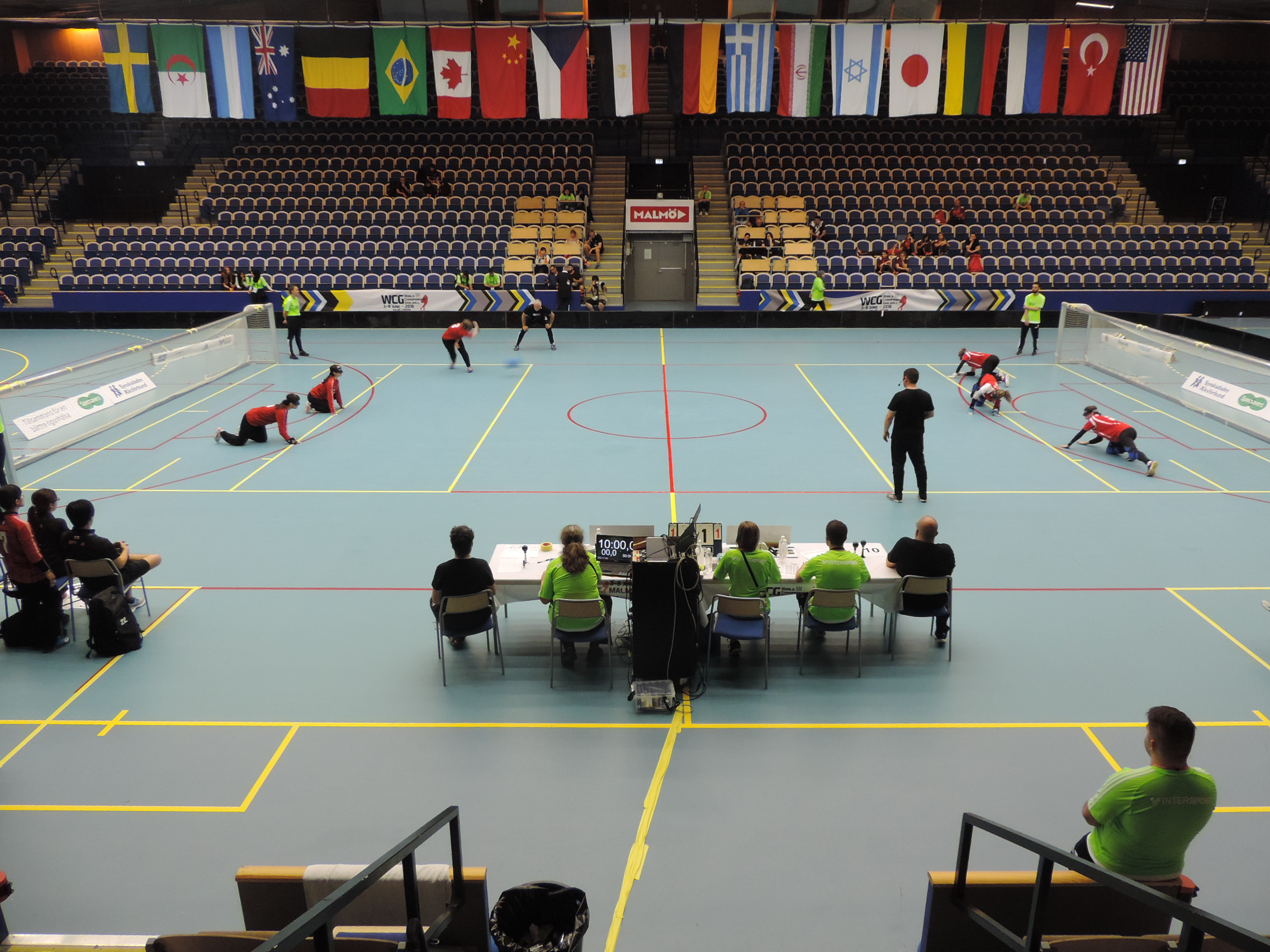
Japan (left of table) throwing to Russia (right of table) women's goalball teams. World Goalball Championships, Malmö, Sweden (June 2018).

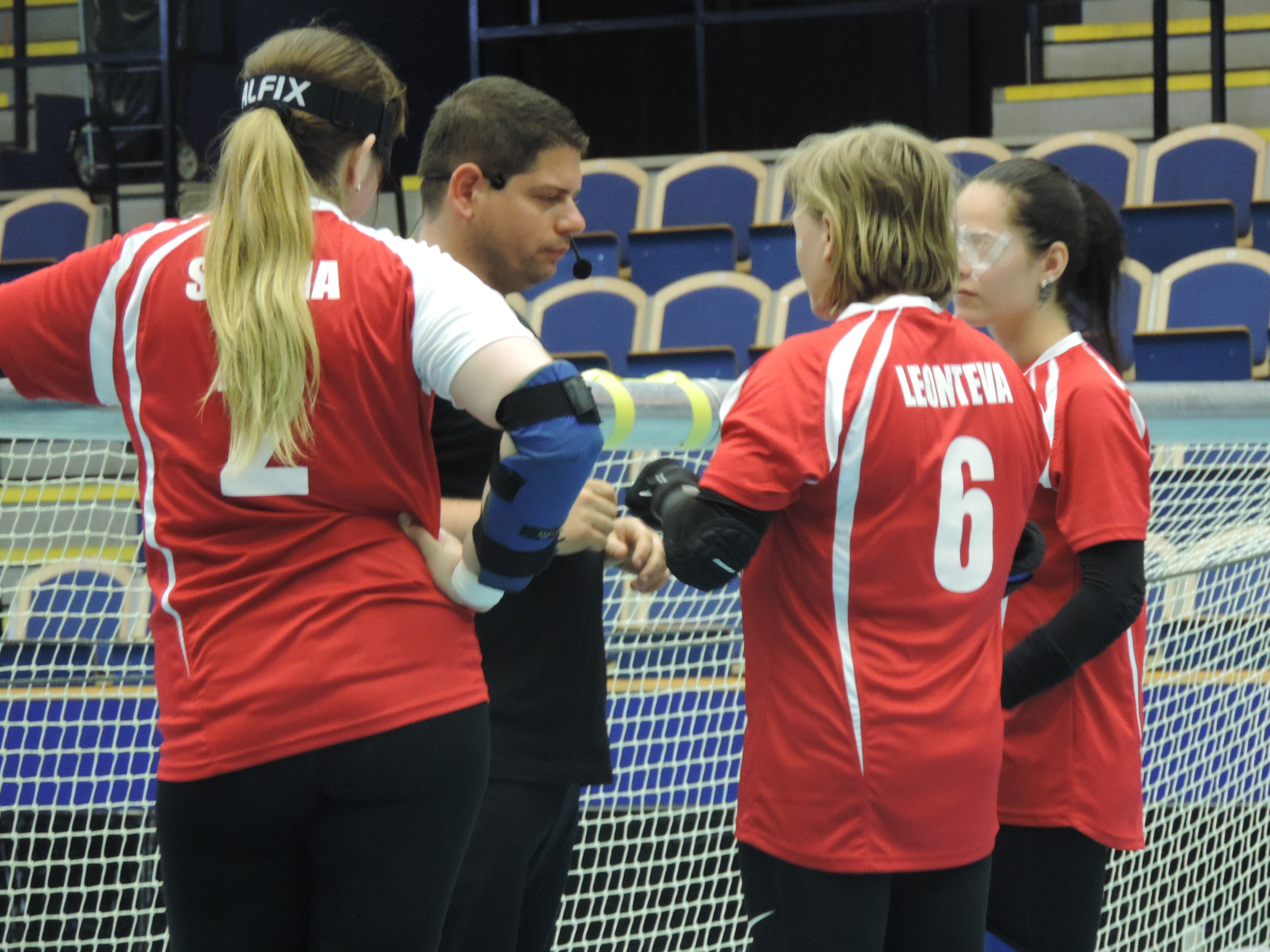
Russian women goalball team eyeshade checks, World Goalball Championships, Malmö, Sweden (2018).

=== 2010 Sheffield ===
The team competed in the 2010 World Championships in Sheffield, England, from 20 to 25 June 2010. They were in Pool Y with a total of six teams. This was their first world championships.

=== 2014 Espoo ===
The team competed in the 2014 World Championships from 30 June to 5 July 2014, in Espoo, Finland. They placed fourth in Pool X, and beat China in the quarter-finals, 4:1. They progressed to the semi-finals, beating Turkey, 2:1, before losing to Turkey in the gold medal match, 0:3.

=== 2018 Malmö ===
The team competed in the 2018 World Championships from 3 to 8 June 2018, in Baltiska Hallen, Malmö, Sweden. They placed first in Pool C with four wins and one draw, and first in overall final standings, after beating Turkey, 4:3. This earned them a slot at the Tokyo 2020 Paralympic Games.

== IBSA World Games ==
=== 2011 Antalya ===
The team competed in the 2011 IBSA World Games from 1 to 10 April 2011, in Antalya, Turkey, organised by the Turkish Blind Sports Federation. They placed third in Group Y, and took the bronze medal.

=== 2015 Seoul ===
The team did not compete in the 2015 IBSA World Games from 10 to 17 May 2015, in Seoul, South Korea.

== Regional championships ==
The team competes in the IBSA Europe goalball region. Groups A and C are held one year, and Group B the following year. Strong teams move towards Group A.

=== 2007 Antalya ===
The team competed at the 2007 IBSA Goalball European Championships, hosted by the Turkish Blind Sports Federation, in Antalya, Turkey with 11 teams contesting the women's competition. The team finished last. This was their debut, with a men's team having played at major international tournaments.

=== 2009 Munich (Group A) ===
Munich, Germany hosted the 2009 European Championships with eleven teams taking part. The team finished the event in eighth place.

=== 2013 Konya (Group A) ===
The team competed at the 2013 IBSA Goalball European Championships, Group A, from 1 to 11 November 2013, at Konya, Turkey, where they finished first.

=== 2015 Kaunas (Group A) ===
The team competed in the 2015 IBSA Goalball European A Championships in Kaunas, Lithuania. They lost the gold medal game to Turkey, 0:5.

=== 2017 Pajulahti (Group A) ===
The team competed in the 2017 IBSA Goalball European A Championships from 15 to 23 September 2017, at Pajulahti, Nastola, Finland. First in Pool Y, in the gold medal match, they beat Turkey, 6:3.

=== 2019 Rostock (Group A) ===
The team competed in the 2019 IBSA Goalball European A Championships from 5 to 14 October 2019, in Rostock, Germany. Playing in Pool X, they placed first in the pool, and fifth in the final standings.

Athletes included: Irina Arestova (Krasnodar Territory), Elizaveta Kemesheva (Vologda Region), Natalya Makoveeva (Tula Region), Anastasiia Mazur (Moscow Region/Kaluga Region), Yuliya Mikhailova (Kaluga Region), and Anna Shevchenko (Vologda Region). Their coach was Ilkam Nabiev.

== Competitive history ==
The table below contains individual game results for the team in international matches and competitions.

Year	Event	Opponent	Date	Venue	Team	Team	Winner	Ref
2007	IBSA Goalball European Championships	Denmark	25 April	OHEP Koleji Spor Salonu, Antalya, Turkey	2	9	Denmark	
2007	IBSA Goalball European Championships	Finland	25 April	OHEP Koleji Spor Salonu, Antalya, Turkey	1	11	Finland	
2007	IBSA Goalball European Championships	Greece	26 April	OHEP Koleji Spor Salonu, Antalya, Turkey	2	10	Greece	
2007	IBSA Goalball European Championships	Sweden	26 April	OHEP Koleji Spor Salonu, Antalya, Turkey	11	1	Sweden	
2007	IBSA Goalball European Championships	Great Britain	27 April	OHEP Koleji Spor Salonu, Antalya, Turkey	7	3	Great Britain	
2007	IBSA Goalball European Championships	Turkey	27 April	OHEP Koleji Spor Salonu, Antalya, Turkey	11	8	Turkey	
2009	IBSA Goalball European Championships	Denmark	24 August	Munich, Germany	13	3	Denmark	
2009	IBSA Goalball European Championships	Ukraine	25 August	Munich, Germany	4	4		
2009	IBSA Goalball European Championships	Greece	26 August	Munich, Germany	1	2	Greece	
2009	IBSA Goalball European Championships	Sweden	26 August	Munich, Germany	5	4	Russia	
2009	IBSA Goalball European Championships	Great Britain	28 August	Munich, Germany	3	4	Great Britain	
2009	IBSA Goalball European Championships	Israel	28 August	Munich, Germany	7	9	Israel	
2009	IBSA Goalball European Championships	Germany	29 August	Munich, Germany	4	1	Germany	
2013	IBSA Goalball European Championships	Sweden	1–11 November	Konya, Turkey	1	11	Russia	
2013	IBSA Goalball European Championships	Ukraine	1–11 November	Konya, Turkey	2	9	Russia	
2013	IBSA Goalball European Championships	Great Britain	1–11 November	Konya, Turkey	10	4	Russia	
2013	IBSA Goalball European Championships	Finland	1–11 November	Konya, Turkey	5	5		
2013	IBSA Goalball European Championships	Germany	1–11 November	Konya, Turkey	3	1	Russia	
2013	IBSA Goalball European Championships	Israel	8 November	Konya, Turkey	3	0	Russia	
2013	IBSA Goalball European Championships	Turkey	7 November	Konya, Turkey	2	4	Russia	

=== Goal scoring by competition ===
Player	Goals	Competition	Notes	Ref
Natalia Kochurova	7	2009 IBSA Goalball European Championships		
Anna Shevchenko	4	2009 IBSA Goalball European Championships		
Ksenia Khristoforova	4	2009 IBSA Goalball European Championships		
Anna Dmitrieva	1	2009 IBSA Goalball European Championships		

== See also ==
- Disabled sports
- Russia at the Paralympics
