= Turkey women's national goalball team =

Turkish national team, for the Paralympic sport of goalball

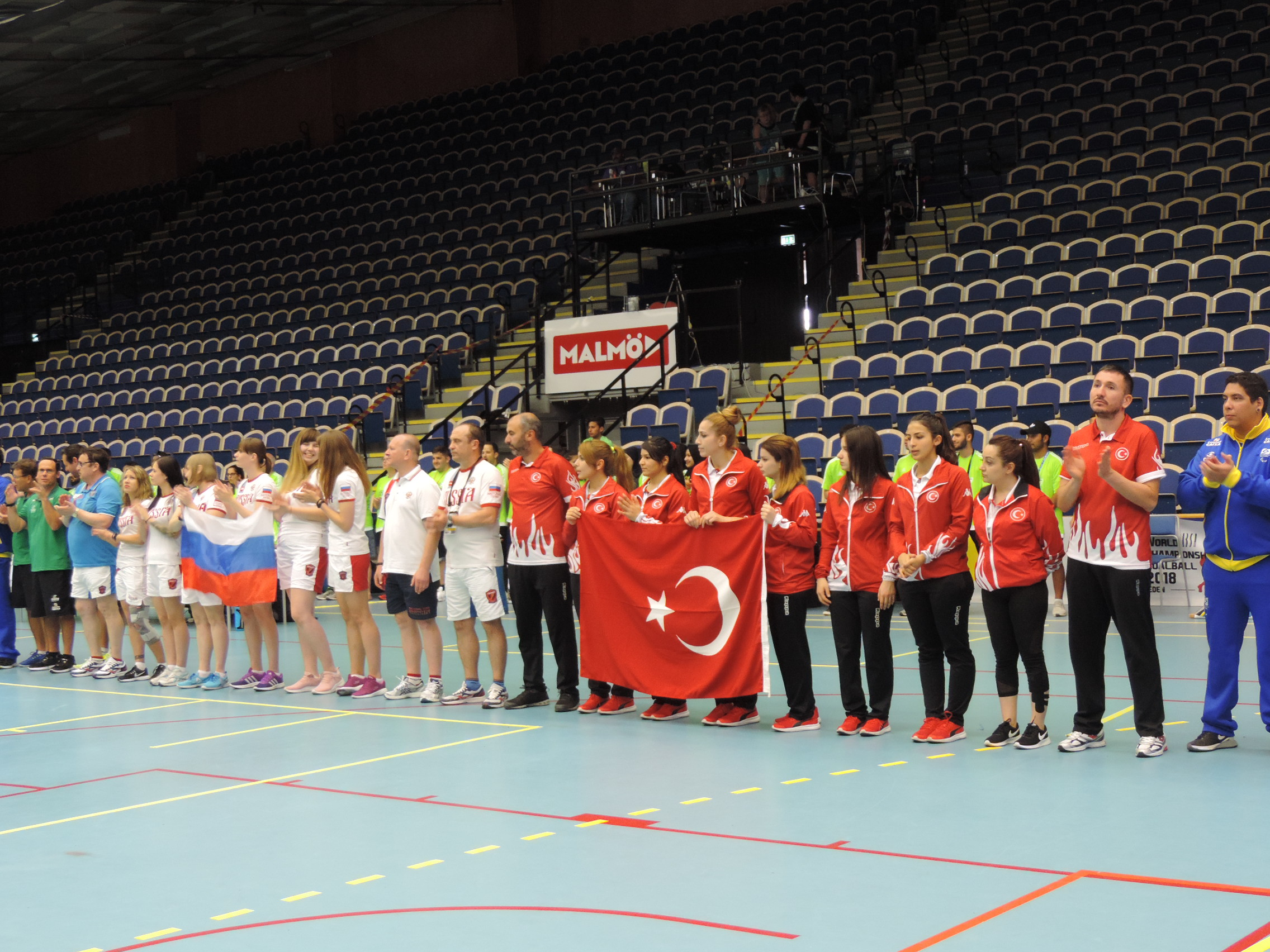
- Finalists of the women's division of the World Goalball Championships, Malmö, Sweden (2018). Russia in white, Turkey in red, start of Brazil in blue.
- Sport: Goalball
- League: IBSA
- Division: Women
- Region: IBSA Europe
- Location: Turkey
- Colours: White, red
- Championships: Paralympic Games medals: : 3:0:0; World Championship medals: : 1: 1:1
- Parent group: Turkish Paralympic Committee
- Website: www.tmpk.org.tr

Turkey women's national goalball team is the women's national team of Turkey. Goalball is a team sport designed specifically for athletes with a vision impairment. It takes part in international competitions.

== Current squad ==
As of 12 November 2021

- Coach : Gültekin Karasu

No.	Player	Class	Date of birth (age)
1	Fatma Gül Güler	B2	12 February 2004 (age 21)
2	Reyhan Yılmaz	B2	18 November 2001 (age 23)
3	Sevda Altunoluk (C)	B2	1 April 1994 (age 31)
4	Şeydanur Kaplan	B2	23 March 2000 (age 25)
7	Sevtap Altunoluk	B2	10 January 1995 (age 30)
8	Berfin Altan	B3	24 November 2003 (age 21)

== Former players ==
- Sadiye Ardıç (2012-2014)
- Buket Atalay (2012-2016)
- Kader Çelik (2017-2020)
- Gülşah Düzgün (2012-2019)
- Neşe Mercan (2012-2019)
- Sümeyye Özcan (2012-2016)
- Seda Yıldız (2013-2019)

== Competitions and results ==
Event	Host	Ranking
2003 IBSA World Games	Quebec City, Canada	10th
2007 IBSA Goalball European Championship	Antalya, Turkey	10th
2009 IBSA Goalball European Championship	Munich, Germany	11th
2010 IBSA Goalball European Women's Group B Championship	Eskişehir, Turkey	(silver)
2011 IBSA World Games	Antalya, Turkey	(bronze)
2011 IBSA European Goalball Championships Div. A	Assens, Denmark	8th
2012 IBSA European Goalball Championships Div. B	Ascoli Piceno, Italy	(gold)
2013 IBSA European Goalball Championships Div. A	Konya, Turkey	(silver)
2013 Malmö Lady Inter Cup	Malmö, Sweden	4th
2013 Pajulahti Games	Nastola, Finland	(gold)
2014 Malmö Lady- and Men InterCup	Malmö, Sweden	(bronze)
2014 International Goalball Tournament	Supraśl, Poland	(gold)
2014 Pajulahti Games	Nastola, Finland	4th
2015 Malmö Lady- and Men InterCup	Malmö, Sweden	(silver)
2015 IBSA European Goalball Championships Div. A	Kaunas, Lithuania	(gold)
2016 Malmö Lady- and Men InterCup	Malmö, Sweden	(silver)
2016 International Goalball Tournament	Supraśl, Poland	(gold)
2016 Paralympics	Rio de Janeiro, Brazil	(gold)
2017 IBSA European Goalball Championships	Nastola, Finland	(silver)
2018 Malmö Lady- and Men InterCup	Malmö, Sweden	(gold)
2018 Goalball World Championships	Malmö, Sweden	(silver)
2019 IBSA European Goalball Championships	Rostock, Germany	(gold)
2020 Paralympics	Tokyo, Japan	1st place, gold medalist(s)
2021 IBSA European Goalball Championships	Samsun, Turkey	(silver)
2024 Paralympics	Paris, France	(gold)

=== 2020 ===
The team competed in the 2020 Summer Paralympics, with competition from Wednesday 25 August to finals on Friday 3 September 2021, in the Makuhari Messe arena, Chiba, Tokyo, Japan. They qualified by placing second at the 2018 IBSA Goalball World Championships.

The following is the Turkey roster in the women's goalball tournament of the 2020 Summer Paralympics.

No.	Player	Class	Date of birth (age)
1	Fatma Gül Güler	B2	12 February 2004 (aged 17)
2	Reyhan Yılmaz	B2	18 November 2001 (aged 19)
3	Sevda Altunoluk	B2	1 April 1994 (aged 27)
4	Şeydanur Kaplan	B2	23 March 2000 (aged 21)
6	Kader Çelik	B2	1 January 2001 (aged 20)
7	Sevtap Altunoluk	B2	10 January 1995 (aged 26)

Pos	Team	Pld	W	D	L	GF	GA	GD	Pts	Qualification
1	Turkey	4	3	0	1	30	11	+19	9	Quarterfinals
2	United States	4	3	0	1	22	10	+12	9	Quarterfinals
3	Japan (H)	4	2	1	1	18	13	+5	7	Quarterfinals
4	Brazil	4	1	1	2	23	19	+4	4	Quarterfinals
5	Egypt	4	0	0	4	3	43	−40	0	

Source: TOCOG
Rules for classification: 1) points; 2) goal difference; 3) number of wins; 4) goals against; 5) head-to-head goal difference.
(H) Hosts

Round-robin

25 August 2021
14:45

Turkey	7–1	Japan
Sevd. Altunoluk 3', 11', 17', 21'; Güler 5', 20'; Yilmaz 21'	Report	Hagiwara 5'

Makuhari Messe, Tokyo
Referee: Svitlana Moroz (Ukraine), Raquel Aguado Gómez (Spain)

26 August 2021; 14:45	Egypt	2–12	Turkey	Makuhari Messe, Tokyo; Referees: Raquel Gomez Aguado (Spain), Raili Sipura (Finland)
26 August 2021; 14:45	Elgabry 1 Ezzeldin 1	Report	Sevd. Altunoluk 8 Sevt. Altunoluk 2 Güler 1 Çelik 1	Makuhari Messe, Tokyo; Referees: Raquel Gomez Aguado (Spain), Raili Sipura (Finland)

28 August 2021
20:30

Turkey	8–4	Brazil
Sevd. Altunoluk 1', 1', 5', 16', 17', 23'; Güler 2', 3'	Report	Amorim 6', 10'; Custodio 13', 15'

Makuhari Messe, Tokyo
Referee: Svitlana Moroz (Ukraine), Raili Sipura (Finland)

30 August 2021
19:00

United States	4–3	Turkey
Mason 8'; Miller 11'; Dennis 13', 22'	Report	Sevd. Altunoluk 1', 4', 9'

Makuhari Messe, Tokyo
Referee: Raquel Aguado Gómez (Spain), Svitlana Moroz (Ukraine)

Quarterfinal

1 September 2021
13:15

Turkey	10–6	Australia
Sevd. Altunoluk 1', 3', 4', 6', 6', 9', 17', 17'; Güler 5'; Çelik 24'	Report	Horsburgh 2', 11', 20', 21', 24'; Smith 5'

Makuhari Messe, Tokyo
Referee: Woradet Kultawongwattana (Thailand), Launel Scott (Canada)

Semifinal

2 September 2021
15:00

Turkey	8–5	Japan
Sevd. Altunoluk 2', 3', 8', 10', 18', 18', 22', 23'	Report	Hagiwara 1', 1', 8', 18', 19'

Makuhari Messe, Tokyo
Referee: Raili Sipura (Finland), Romualdas Vaitiekus (Lithuania)

Final

3 September 2021
17:45

United States	2–9	Turkey
Mason 9'; Miller 22'	Report	Sevd. Altunoluk 1', 1', 5', 6', 6', 8', 18', 18', 20'

Makuhari Messe, Tokyo
Referee: Raquel Aguado Gómez (Spain), Svitlana Moroz (Ukraine)

=== 2021 ===
The team competes in the 2021 IBSA Goalball European A Championships from 4 to 13 November 2021 in Samsun, Turkey. Turkey won the silver medal after losing to Russia 4–5 in the final.

Turkey team consisted of Fatma Gül Güler (#1), Reyhan Yılmaz (#2), Sevda Altunoluk (#3), Şeydanur Kaplan (#4), Sevtap Altunoluk (#7), Berfin Altan (#8) coached by Gültekin Karasu.

2021 IBSA Goalball European Championships - Samsun, Turkey (silver)
Date	Opponent	Result	Ref
5 November	Denmark	W 9-5	
6 November	Russia	W 2-1	
7 November	Great Britain	L 2-3	
9 November	Finland	W 6-2	
10 November	Germany	W 10-0	
11 November	Israel	W 7-6	
12 November	Russia	L 4-5	

== See also ==
- Disabled sports
- IBSA Europe Goalball Championships
- Turkey men's national goalball team
- Turkey at the Paralympics
