= Berfin (name) =

Berfin is a feminine given name of Kurdish origin meaning snowdrop. The name is derived from the Kurdish words “berf,” meaning snow, and the suffix “-în,” which can mean "made of" or "related to". The name is also interpreted as “snowflake” or “of the snow.” The name symbolizes "purity, beauty, and uniqueness". Berfin is widely used among Kurds and non-Kurds across Kurdistan and in neighboring countries. It is also a popular name among Kurdish diaspora communities in Europe, North America, and other parts of the world. The name has gained recognition due to its poetic meaning and cultural significance within Kurdish identity. Notable people with the name include:

== Given name ==
- Berfin Altan (born 2003), Turkish goalball player
- Berfin Altun (born 1999), Turkish weightlifter
- Berfin Şengül (born 2002), Turkish curler
