= Fatma Gül Güler =

Turkish Paralympic goalball player (born 2004)

Personal information
- Born: 12 February 2004 (age 22)
- Height: 1.63 m (5 ft 4 in)
- Weight: 51 kg (112 lb)

Sport
- Sport: Goalball
- Club: Kahramanmaraş Akçakoyunlu İSK
- Coached by: Gültekin Karasu
Medal record
Women's goalball
Representing Turkey
Paralympic Games
Gold medal – first place	2020 Tokyo	Team
Gold medal – first place	2024 Paris	Team
IBSA World Championships
Gold medal – first place	2022 Matosinhos	Team
IBSA European Championships
Gold medal – first place	2023 Podgorica	Team
Silver medal – second place	2021 Samsun	Team

Fatma Gül Güler (born 12 February 2004) is a Turkish Paralympian goalball player having visual impairment. She is part of the two-time Paralympics as well as world and European champion Turkish team.

== Sport career ==
Güler started playing goalball in 2012 under the guidance of her primary school teacher. She played in the school team during her education in the middle school for visual impaired. Her school team became runner-up in the Turkish Girls' Goalball Championship in 2018.

She plays for Kahramanmaraş Akçakoyunlu İdmanyurdu Sports Club in her hometown, which successfully compete in the Turkish Women's Goalball First League. She is coached by Gültekin Karasu. She is 1.63 m (5 ft 4 in) tall at 51 kg (112 lb).

In 2021, she was admitted to the national goalball team. Güler is one of the top goalscorers of Turkey along her national teammate Sevda Altunoluk.

At the delayed 2020 Tokyo Paralympics, she and her teammates won the gold medal.

Güler was a member of the national team, which won the silver medal at the 2021 IBSA Goalball European Championships in Samsun, Turkey.

She claimed the gold medal with her teammates at the 2022 Goalball World Championships in Matosinhos, Portugal.

In 2023, she took the gold medal at the IBSA Goalball European Championships in Podgorica, Montenegro.

She was part of the national team, which won the gold medal defeating Israel in the final of the 2024 Summer Paralympics in Paris, France.

== Personal life ==
Fatma Gül Güler was born in Kahramanmaraş, Turkey on 12 February 2004. She is congenitally visually impaired.

After completing her secondary education in a school for visual impaired, she started studying sport coaching in the Faculty of Sports science at the Karamanoğlu Mehmetbey University in Karaman.

== Honours ==
=== Domestic ===
- (silver) 2018 Turkish Girls' Goalball Championship

=== International ===
- (gold) 2024 Summer Paralympics in Paris, France
- (gold) 2023 IBSA Goalball European Championship in Podgorica, Montenegro
- (gold) 2022 Goalball World Championships in Matosinhos, Portugal
- (silver) 2021 IBSA Goalball European Championship in Samsun, Turkey
- (gold) 2020 Summer Paralympics in Tokyo, Japan
