= Goalball at the 2024 Summer Paralympics – Women's tournament =

Women's goalball at the XVII Paralympic Games
- Venue: South Paris Arena
- Dates: 29 August – 5 September 2024
- Competitors: 22 from 8 nations
- Teams: 8

Medalists
1st place, gold medalist(s)		Turkey
2nd place, silver medalist(s)		Israel
3rd place, bronze medalist(s)		China

The goalball women's tournament was contested from 29 August to 5 September. There were eight teams consisting of six players split into two groups: Group C and Group D. Turkey were the defending Paralympic champions.

== Participating teams ==
Group C

- Brazil
- China
- Israel
- Turkey

Group D

- Canada
- France
- Japan
- South Korea

== Preliminary round ==
=== Group C ===
Pos	Team	Pld	W	D	L	GF	GA	GD	Pts	Qualification
1	China	3	3	0	0	16	7	+9	9	Quarter-finals
2	Turkey	3	1	1	1	13	14	−1	4	Quarter-finals
3	Israel	3	1	0	2	13	15	−2	3	Quarter-finals
4	Brazil	3	0	1	2	8	14	−6	1	Quarter-finals

Source: Paris 2024
Rules for classification: 1) points; 2) goal difference; 3) number of wins; 4) goals against; 5) head-to-head goal difference.
29 August 2024
10:30

Turkey	3–3	Brazil
Sevd. Altunoluk 2', 4', 22'	Report	de Lima 0', 7'; Vitorino 12'

South Paris Arena, Paris
Referee:
Romualdas Vaitekus (Lithuania)
Janice Dawson (Canada)

30 August 2024
10:30

Brazil	4–8	Israel
Vitorino 11', 18'; de Lima 13'; Moura 20'	Report	Mizrahi 8', 13', 16', 22'; Ben-David 8', 10', 16', 20'

South Paris Arena, Paris
Referee:
Patrik Larsson (Sweden)
Claude Dagenais (Canada)

30 August 2024
19:00

China	7–5	Turkey
Wang Chunyan 1', 6', 6', 12', 13', 13', 16'	Report	Sevt. Altunoluk 0', 1', 3', 5'; Güler 5'

South Paris Arena, Paris
Referee:
Janice Dawson (Canada)
Sarah Kuper (Germany)

31 August 2024
10:30

Turkey	5–4	Israel
Sevd. Altunoluk 7', 8', 8', 14'; Güler 9'	Report	Mahamid 13'; Ben-David 15', 20'; Mizrahi 23'

South Paris Arena, Paris
Referee:
Claude Dagenais (Canada)
Antonios Christodoulos (Greece)

31 August 2024
14:45

China	3–1	Brazil
Wang Chunyan 11', 19'; Cao 14'	Report	Lima 14'

South Paris Arena, Paris
Referee:
Raquel Aguado (Spain)
Manar Obeidat (Jordan)

1 September 2024
14:45

Israel	1–6	China
Mizrahi 18'	Report	Wang Chenyang 3', 13', 20'; Cao 5', 13', 14'

South Paris Arena, Paris
Referee:
Antonios Christodoulos (Greece)
Raquel Aguado (Spain)

=== Group D ===
Pos	Team	Pld	W	D	L	GF	GA	GD	Pts	Qualification
1	Japan	3	3	0	0	11	2	+9	9	Quarter-finals
2	Canada	3	1	1	1	11	2	+9	4	Quarter-finals
3	South Korea	3	1	1	1	7	4	+3	4	Quarter-finals
4	France (H)	3	0	0	3	1	22	−21	0	Quarter-finals

Source: Paris 2024
Rules for classification: 1) points; 2) goal difference; 3) number of wins; 4) goals against; 5) head-to-head goal difference.
(H) Hosts
29 August 2024
14:45

Canada	10–0	France
Salehizadeh 1', 4'; Reinke 1', 5', 9', 20', 20', 21'; Mahon 13'; Burk 22'	Report

South Paris Arena, Paris
Referee:
Antonios Christodoulos (Greece)
Juha Vuokila (Finland)

29 August 2024
19:00

South Korea	1–3	Japan
Sim Seon-hwa 3'	Report	Hagiwara 7', 17', 23'

South Paris Arena, Paris
Referee:
Linda Welborn (United States)
Patrik Larsson (Sweden)

30 August 2024
14:45

Japan	2–1	Canada
Hagiwara 10', 22'	Report	Reinke 0'

South Paris Arena, Paris
Referee:
Raquel Aguado (Spain)
Linda Welborn (United States)

31 August 2024
19:00

France	1–6	South Korea
Ajami 0'	Report	Sim Seon-hwa 3', 14', 15', 16'; Park Eun-ji 14', 15'

South Paris Arena, Paris
Referee:
Kazuto Ono (Japan)
Sarah Kuper (Germany)

1 September 2024
10:30

South Korea	0–0	Canada
	Report

South Paris Arena, Paris
Referee:
Romualdas Vaitiekus (Lithuania)
Kazuto Ono (Japan)

1 September 2024
19:00

France	0–6	Japan
	Report	Hagiwara 1'; Komiya 10', 18'; Temma 11'; Arai 12'; Amuro 22'

South Paris Arena, Paris
Referee:
Linda Welborn (United States)
Janice Dawson (Canada)

== Knockout stage ==
=== Bracket ===
Quarterfinals
3 September
China	12
France	2
3 September
Canada	1
Israel	5
3 September
Japan	0
Brazil	2
3 September
Turkey	6
South Korea	3

Semifinals
4 September
China	1
Israel	2
4 September
Brazil	1
Turkey	3

Gold medal match
5 September
Israel	3
Turkey	8
Bronze medal match
5 September
China	6
Brazil	0

=== Quarter-finals ===
3 September 2024
13:30

China	12–2	France
Cao 1', 3', 7', 18', 19', 21', 22'; Zhang 15', 17', 17'; Wang Chunyan 20'; Wang Chunhua 22'	Report	Rondpierre 13'; Ajami 17' (pen.)

South Paris Arena, Paris
Referee:
Manar Obeidat (Jordan)
Patrik Larsson (Sweden)

3 September 2024
15:15

Canada	1–5	Israel
Burk 13'	Report	Ben-David 1', 6', 12', 19'; Mizrahi 18'

South Paris Arena, Paris
Referee:
Sarah Kuper (Germany)
Raquel Aguado (Spain)

3 September 2024
18:00

Japan	0–2	Brazil
	Report	Vitorino 0', 16'

South Paris Arena, Paris
Referee:
Juha Vuokila (Finland)
Romualdas Vaitiekus (Lithuania)

3 September 2024
19:45

Turkey	6–3	South Korea
Sevd. Altunoluk 0', 2', 6', 12'; Güler 6'; Altan 22'	Report	Seo Min-ji 5'; Sim Seon-hwa 17', 23'

South Paris Arena, Paris
Referee:
Antonios Christodoulos (Greece)
Linda Welborn (United States)

=== Seventh place match ===
4 September 2024
10:00

South Korea	2–2	France
Sim Seon-hwa 3'; Seo Min-ji 11'	Report	Rondepierre 7'; Ajami 20'
Penalties
Kim Hee-jin (penalty missed); Sim Seon-hwa (penalty missed); Seo Min-ji (penalty missed); Park Eun-ji (penalty scored); Kim Eun-ji (penalty scored); Choi Eum-jee (penalty missed)	2–1	(penalty missed) Gonzalez; (penalty scored) Berquier; (penalty missed) Ajami; (penalty missed) Matos; (penalty missed) Rondepierre; (penalty missed) Alhan

South Paris Arena, Paris
Referee:
Patrik Larsson (Sweden)
Claude Dagenais (Canada)

=== Fifth place match ===
4 September 2024
11:45

Japan	0–1	Canada
	Report	Burk 4'

South Paris Arena, Paris
Referee:
Sarah Kuper (Germany)
Linda Welborn (United States)

=== Semi-finals ===
4 September 2024
15:15

China	1–2	Israel
Wang Chunyan 8'	Report	Ben-David 3'; Mahamid 14'

South Paris Arena, Paris
Referee:
Romualdas Vaitiekus (Lithuania)
Janice Dawson (Canada)

4 September 2024
19:45

Brazil	1–3	Turkey
Vitorino 6'	Report	Güler 2'; Altunoluk 3', 8'

South Paris Arena, Paris
Referee:
Manar Obeidat (Jordan)
Juha Vuokila (Finland)

=== Bronze medal match ===
5 September 2024
15:00

China	6–0	Brazil
Cao 2', 12'; Wang Chunyan 3', 12', 13', 19'	Report

South Paris Arena, Paris
Referee:
Azhi Mahmood (Iraq)
Sarah Kuper (Germany)

=== Gold medal match ===
5 September 2024
17:45

Israel	3–8	Turkey
Ben-David 3', 8', 18'	Report	Sevd. Altunoluk 1', 3', 4', 15'; Güler 1', 4', 5', 8'

South Paris Arena, Paris
Referee:
Kazuto Ono (Japan)
Raquel Aguado (Spain)

== Final ranking ==
Rank	Team
1st place, gold medalist(s)	Turkey
2nd place, silver medalist(s)	Israel
3rd place, bronze medalist(s)	China
4	Brazil
5	Canada
6	Japan
7	South Korea
8	France

== See also ==
- Goalball at the 2024 Summer Paralympics – Men's tournament
