= Elham Mahamid Ruzin =

Israeli Paralympic goalball player (born 1990)

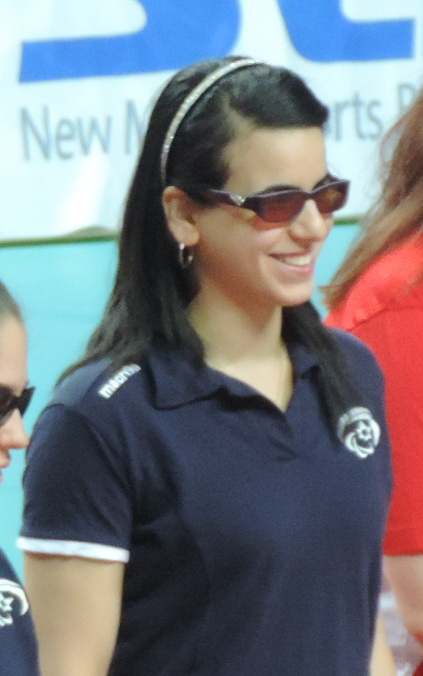
- Mahamid Ruzin in 2015

Personal information
- Native name: אלהאם מחמיד רוזין إلهام محاميد روزين
- Born: 16 February 1990 (age 36) Umm al-Fahm, Israel: Hebrew University of Jerusalem; Seminar Hakibutzim
- Spouse: Michael Ruzin
- Children: 2

Sport
- Sport: Goalball
- Disability class: B3
- Coached by: Raz Shoham
Medal record
Event	1st	2nd	3rd
Paralympic Games	0	1	0
IBSA World Games	1	0	0
Goalball World Championships	0	0	1
Goalball European Championships	0	1	2
Lady Intercup	0	1	0
Women's goalball
Representing Israel
Paralympic Games
Silver medal – second place	2024 Paris	Team
IBSA World Games
Gold medal – first place	2015 Seoul	Women's goalball
Goalball World Championships
Bronze medal – third place	2022 Matosinhos	Women's goalball
Goalball European Championships
Bronze medal – third place	2017 Finland	Women's goalball
Bronze medal – third place	2021 Turkey	Women's goalball
Silver medal – second place	2023 Montenegro	Women's goalball
Lady & Men Intercup
Silver medal – second place	2023 Malmo	Women's goalball

Elham Mahamid Ruzin (Hebrew: אלהאם מחמיד רוזין, Arabic: إلهام محاميد روزين; born 16 February 1990) is an Israeli silver medalist Paralympic goalball player and former captain of the Israel women's national goalball team for eight years, from 2010 to 2018.

Mahamid Ruzin is a Muslim Arab Israeli. She is legally blind, with the hereditary genetic eye disease achromatopsia, color blindness, and a very intense sensitivity to daylight. In 2015, as she competed for it, Team Israel won the gold medal at the IBSA World Games. She competed for Israel at the 2016 Rio Paralympics in Brazil, won a bronze medal with the team at the 2017 European Championship, and then won a silver medal with the team at the 2019 European Championship. She then competed with Israel at the 2020 Tokyo Paralympics in 2021 in Japan.

She competed for Israel at the 2024 Paris Paralympics in the Women's goalball tournament, where Mahamid Ruzin and Team Israel won a silver medal.

== Early and personal life ==
Mahamid was born in the Galilee in the Arab Muslim city of Umm al-Fahm, Israel, and is a Muslim Arab Israeli. She is the eldest daughter of six children.

Mahamid Ruzin is legally blind, and was diagnosed as a child with the hereditary genetic eye disease achromatopsia, color blindness, and a very intense sensitivity to daylight. The disease does not have a cure, and she wears special glasses. It was discovered that she had the disease when she was four months old. Two of her brothers also have the disease.

Mahamid volunteered for Sherut Leumi post-secondary school national service at a legal aid clinic in Jerusalem. Mahamid Ruzin holds a bachelor's degree in education and theater studies from the Hebrew University of Jerusalem, as well as a master's degree in therapy through psychodrama from Seminar Hakibutzim in 2016. She speaks Arabic, Hebrew, English, and Russian.

In 2018 Mahamid married Michael Ruzin, who is Jewish, has a vision impairment as well, and is the captain of Israel men's national goalball team. They had met at a sports camp when she was 19 years old and they were both studying in university in Jerusalem. She and her husband have a boy and a girl, and the family lives in Hadera, Israel.

In aftermath of the 7 October attack on Israel, Mahamid Ruzin offered her home to host Israeli evacuees, and said that she feels the same fear that her neighbor feels, and that she cried when her neighbor was called up to serve in the Israel Defense Forces reserves. She noted: "When you are on the bus, no terrorist cares if you are Arab or Jewish."

== Goalball career ==
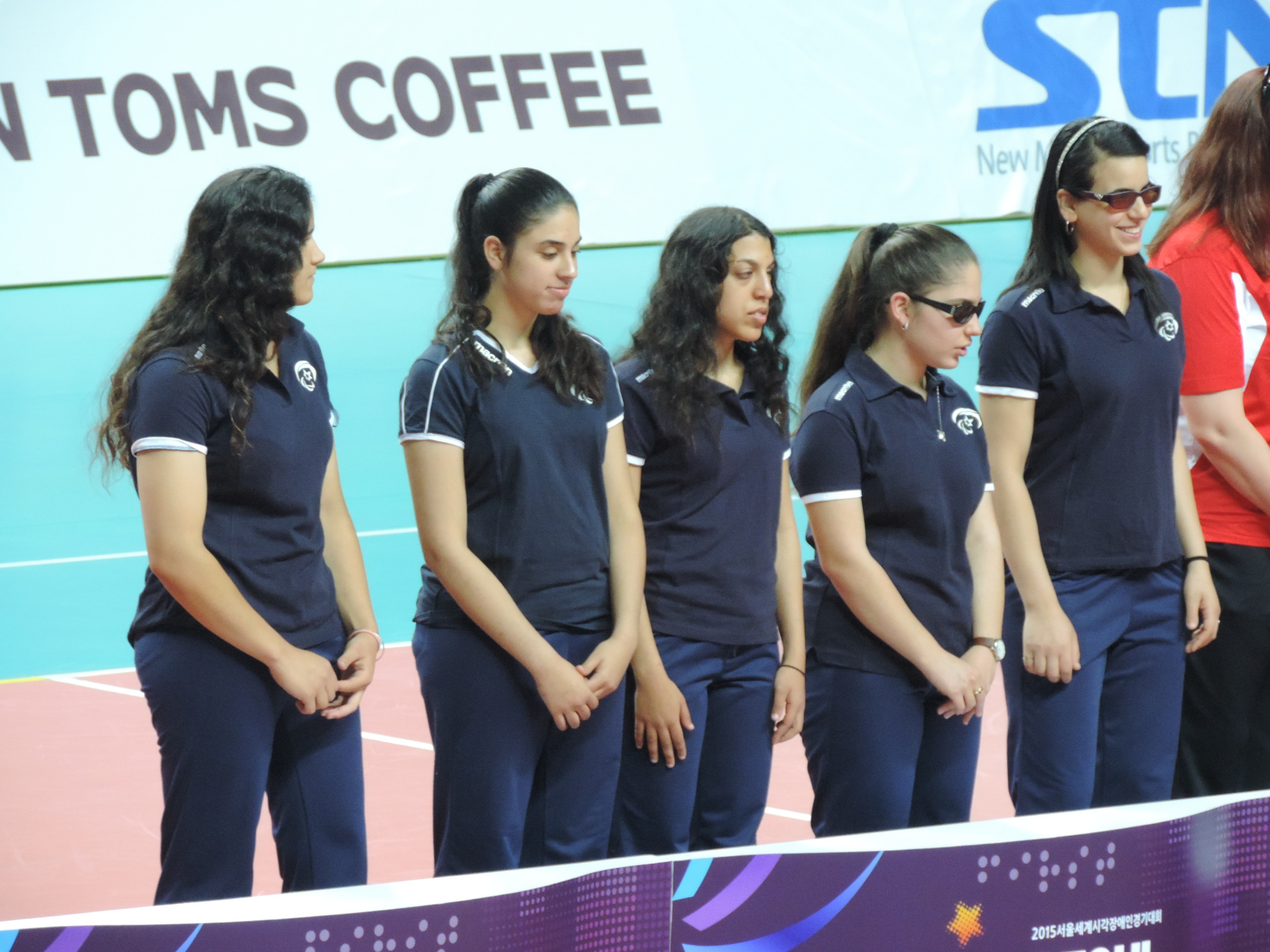
Mahamid Ruzin (on the right) at the 2015 IBSA World Games gold medal podium

Mahamid Ruzin's coach is Raz Shoham. As to her representing Israel, she said: "I am very proud as an athlete to represent my country."

Mahamid Ruzin first played goalball at a blind club in Um al-Fahem when she was 15 years old, and took part at an after-school program at the Jewish Institute for the Blind. She said "I started to train, and I started to feel wow I'm winning and I'm good at something, suddenly the competitive thing that was very closed in me and I had no place to compete, so suddenly it came out. I began to discover abilities in myself that I did not know about at all. Ability to communicate with people, with other children. help, understand, support."

The Israel Paralympic Committee ultimately decided to form a girls' team around her. Mahamid was chosen to be the captain of the Israel women's national goalball team, a position that she held for eight years, from 2010 to 2018.

=== 2015–16; World Games championship and Rio Paralympics ===
In 2015, as Mahamid competed for it, Team Israel won the gold medal at the IBSA World Games. Team Israel defeated China 4–1 in the final, as Mahamid Ruzin scored all four of the team's goals. It ensured its spot at the 2016 Summer Paralympics, and Mahamid Ruzin said: "I will do everything to make my country, my relatives, and the Arab sector proud, showing that there is no difference between all of us and that we can live together."

She competed for Israel at the 2016 Rio Paralympics, where the team was eliminated in the quarter-finals and came in 7th place. At those Games, Mahamid scored the first Paralympic goal for Team Israel. She said: "I don't want to just go to the Olympics. There are those who say 'well done to you, the main thing is that you participated, the fact that you are there is already a great honor'. I understand and appreciate it, but my ambition ... is of course to win an Olympic medal."

=== 2017–23; European Championship medals, Tokyo Paralympics ===
In 2017, Israel won the bronze medal at the European Championship, prevailing in the deciding game 1:2 against the Greek team, with Mahamid scoring both of the team's goals.

Team Israel won the silver medal at the 2019 European Championship, and qualified for the Tokyo Paralympic Games. Mahamid Ruzin then competed with Israel at the 2020 Tokyo Paralympics in 2021 in Japan.

=== 2024–present; Paris Paralympics ===
Mahamid Ruzin competed for Israel at the 2024 Paris Paralympics in the Women's goalball tournament, where she and Team Israel won a silver medal. The team defeated Canada in the quarter-final and China (with her scoring the winning goal) in the semi-final, and lost to Turkey in the gold medal round.

== Awards ==
Mahamid Ruzin was named the 2021 Para-Athlete Peace Prize Global Winner by the Religious Freedom & Business Foundation. In January 2023 she received a certificate of appreciation from the Acting Mayor of Hadera, Nir Ben Haim, for competing in the Tokyo Olympics in goalball and winning third place in the World Championship with the Israeli national team in goal ball.

== See also ==
- List of Arab citizens of Israel
- List of 2024 Summer Paralympics medal winners
