= Noa Malka =

Israeli Paralympic goalball player

Personal information
- Native name: נועה מלכה
- Born: 15 June 2003 (age 23)

Sport
- Country: Israel
- Sport: Goalball
Medal record
Event	1st	2nd	3rd
Paralympic Games	0	1	0
IBSA World Games	0	0	0
Goalball World Championships	0	0	1
Goalball European Championships	0	2	1
Lady Intercup	1	2	0
Women's goalball
Representing Israel
Paralympic Games
Silver medal – second place	2024 Paris	Team
Goalball World Championships
Bronze medal – third place	2022 Matosinhos	Women's goalball
Goalball European Championships
Silver medal – second place	2019 Germany	Women's goalball
Bronze medal – third place	2021 Turkey	Women's goalball
Silver medal – second place	2023 Montenegro	Women's goalball
Lady & Men Intercup
Silver medal – second place	2022 Malmo	Women's goalball
Gold medal – first place	2022 Berlin	Women's goalball
Silver medal – second place	2023 Malmo	Women's goalball

Noa Malka (Hebrew: נועה מלכה; born 15 June 2003) is an Israeli Paralympic goalball player. She competed for Israel at the 2024 Paris Paralympics in the Women's goalball tournament, where she and the Israel women's national goalball team won a silver medal.

== Early life ==
Malka was born with albinism and suffers from congenital visual defects. Malka grew up in Haifa, and after graduating from Urban High School A, she volunteered for two years for national service in the oncology department at the Sourasky Tel Aviv Medical Center.

== Goalball career ==
Malka trains in goalball as part of Beit HaLochem in Tel Aviv and was added to the Israel women's national goalball team, with which she participated in the Tokyo Paralympic Games (2020). In 2022, she participated with the national team in the World Championship held in Portugal, where she scored the first goal in a global competition. At the World Championship they won a bronze medal and earlier that year the team won a gold medal at the World Teams Tournament held in Germany. As part of the junior team, Malka was also a partner in winning a silver medal at the 2022 European Under-19 Championship.

She competed for Israel at the 2024 Paris Paralympics in the Women's goalball tournament, where she and Team Israel won a silver medal.
