= Gal Hamrani =

Israeli Paralympic goalball player

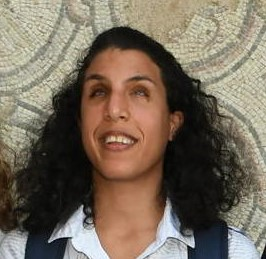

Personal information
- Native name: גל חמרני

Sport
- Country: Israel
- Sport: Goalball
Medal record
Event	1st	2nd	3rd
Paralympic Games	0	1	0
IBSA World Games	1	0	1
Goalball World Championships	0	0	1
Goalball European Championships	0	2	2
Lady Intercup	1	2	0
Women's goalball
Representing Israel
Paralympic Games
Silver medal – second place	2024 Paris	Team
IBSA World Games
Gold medal – first place	2015 Seoul	Women's goalball
Bronze medal – third place	2019 Fort Wayne	Women's goalball
Goalball World Championships
Bronze medal – third place	2022 Matosinhos	Women's goalball
Goalball European Championships
Bronze medal – third place	2017 Finland	Women's goalball
Silver medal – second place	2019 Germany	Women's goalball
Bronze medal – third place	2021 Turkey	Women's goalball
Silver medal – second place	2023 Montenegro	Women's goalball
Lady & Men Intercup
Silver medal – second place	2022 Malmo	Women's goalball
Gold medal – first place	2022 Berlin	Women's goalball
Silver medal – second place	2023 Malmo	Women's goalball

Gal Hamrani (Hebrew: גל חמרני; born 1 December 1992) is an Israeli Paralympic goalball player. She competed for Israel at the 2024 Paris Paralympics in the Women's goalball tournament, where she and the Israel women's national goalball team won a silver medal.

== Early life ==
Hamrani was born with aniridia and glaucoma, resulting in her being fully blind in one eye, limited eyesight in the other and being assisted by a guide dog. She completed her sherut Leumi volunteering at a hospital.

== Goalball career ==
Hamrani began practicing goalball at age 13, joined the Israel women's national goalball team and is the team captain. She took part in the 2016 Summer Paralympics and was team captain during the 2020 Summer Paralympics. The team qualified for the Paralympic Games after achieving gold medal at the 2015 IBSA World Games and silver medal at the 2019 Goalball European Championships.

She competed for Israel at the 2024 Paris Paralympics in the Women's goalball tournament, where she and the Israel women's national goalball team won a silver medal.

== Honors ==
In 2025, Hamrani was honored as one of the torchbearers in the national Israeli Independence Day ceremony.
