= China women's national goalball team =

Chinese national team, for the Paralympic sport of goalball

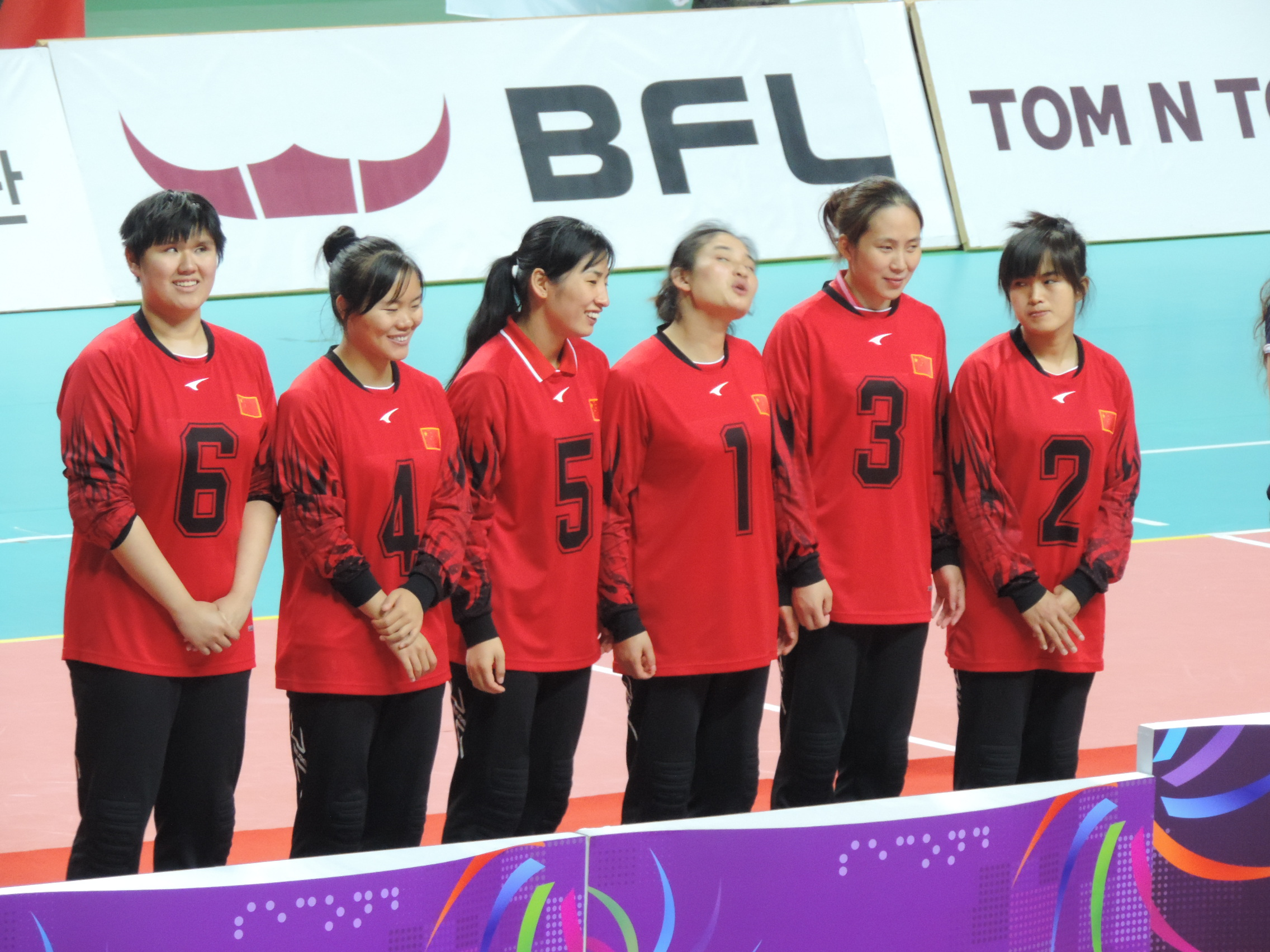
- Silver medalists at the IBSA World Games, Seoul, South Korea (May 2015).
- Sport: Goalball
- League: IBSA
- Division: Women
- Region: IBSA Asia
- Location: China
- Colours: Red
- Championships: Paralympic Games medals: : 0: 3: 1 World Championship medals: : 1: 1: 0
- Parent group: China Administration of Sports for Persons with Disabilities

China women's national goalball team is the women's national team of China. Goalball is a team sport designed specifically for athletes with vision impairment. It takes part in international competitions.

== Paralympic Games ==
=== 2008 Beijing ===
As the host nation, the team competed in the 2008 Summer Paralympics, from 6 to 17 September 2008, in the Beijing Institute of Technology Gymnasium 'bat wing' arena, Beijing, China. There were 12 men's teams and 8 women's teams taking part in this event. They took the silver medal.

=== 2012 London ===
The team competed in the 2012 Summer Paralympics from 30 August to 7 September 2012, in the Copper Box Arena, London, England. The team came second.

The following is the China roster in the women's goalball tournament of the 2012 Summer Paralympics.

No.	Player	Age
1	Wang Ruixue	25
2	Chen Fengqing	27
3	Lin Shan	26
4	Wang Shasha	26
5	Fan Feifei	23
6	Ju Zhen	23

Team	Pld	W	D	L	GF	GA	GD	Pts	Qualification
China	4	4	0	0	28	4	+24	12	Quarterfinals
Great Britain	4	2	1	1	10	9	+1	7	Quarterfinals
Brazil	4	2	0	2	8	15	−7	6	Quarterfinals
Finland	4	1	1	2	10	13	−3	4	Quarterfinals
Denmark	4	0	0	4	3	18	−15	0	Eliminated

Source: "London 2012 Paralympic Games - Goalball results" (PDF). Paralympic.org. 3 October 2012 – via Goalball.sport.

30 August 2012; 18:30	China	7 – 1	Great Britain	Copper Box, London; Referees: Janned Ahokas (FIN), Dawna Christy (CAN)
30 August 2012; 18:30	Wang R. 4 Chen 2 Lin 1	Report	Sharkey 1	Copper Box, London; Referees: Janned Ahokas (FIN), Dawna Christy (CAN)

31 August 2012; 16:15	Brazil	0 – 8	China	Copper Box, London; Referees: Juha Vuokila (FIN), Dina Murdie (GBR)
31 August 2012; 16:15		Report	Wang S. 5 Chen 1 Lin 1 Ju 1	Copper Box, London; Referees: Juha Vuokila (FIN), Dina Murdie (GBR)

3 September 2012; 13:45	China	8 – 1	Denmark	Copper Box, London; Referees: Tony Connolly (USA), Ali Aldarsony (KSA)
3 September 2012; 13:45	Chen 4 Wang S. 3 Ju 1	Report	Jørgensen 1	Copper Box, London; Referees: Tony Connolly (USA), Ali Aldarsony (KSA)

4 September 2012; 10:15	Finland	2 – 5	China	Copper Box, London; Referees: Bulent Kimyon (TUR), Launel Scott (CAN)
4 September 2012; 10:15	Hynninen 1 Somerkivi 1	Report	Wang R. 4 Chen 1	Copper Box, London; Referees: Bulent Kimyon (TUR), Launel Scott (CAN)

Quarter-finals

5 September 2012; 09:00	China	5 – 0	United States	Copper Box, London; Referees: Dawna Christy (CAN), Juha Vuokila (FIN)
5 September 2012; 09:00	Chen 2 Wang S. 2 Lin 1	Report		Copper Box, London; Referees: Dawna Christy (CAN), Juha Vuokila (FIN)

Semi-finals

6 September 2012; 13:30	China	4 – 1	Finland	Copper Box, London; Referees: Dawna Christy (CAN), Carla Da Matta (BRA)
6 September 2012; 13:30	Chen 2 Lin 1 Wang S. 1	Report	Leppänen 1	Copper Box, London; Referees: Dawna Christy (CAN), Carla Da Matta (BRA)

Finals

7 September 2012; 15:00	China	0 – 1	Japan	Copper Box, London
7 September 2012; 15:00		Report	Adachi 1	Copper Box, London

=== 2016 Rio de Janeiro ===
The team competed in the 2016 Summer Paralympics, with competition from Thursday, 8 September, to the finals on Friday, 16 September 2016, in the temporary Future Arena, Rio de Janeiro, Brazil. The team came second.

The following is the China roster in the women's goalball tournament of the 2016 Summer Paralympics.

No.	Player	Class	Date of birth (age)
1	Chen Fengqing	B1	17 July 1985 (aged 31)
2	Ju Zhen	B2	10 May 1989 (aged 27)
3	Zhang Wei	B1	22 December 1989 (aged 26)
4	Zhao Kaimei	B2	10 November 1987 (aged 28)
5	Zhang Huiwen	B1	12 June 1993 (aged 23)
6	Sun Le	B1	17 August 1993 (aged 23)

Pos	Team	Pld	W	D	L	GF	GA	GD	Pts	Qualification
1	Turkey	4	4	0	0	37	11	+26	12	Quarter-finals
2	China	4	3	0	1	21	14	+7	9	Quarter-finals
3	Canada	4	2	0	2	16	22	−6	6	Quarter-finals
4	Ukraine	4	0	1	3	9	17	−8	1	Quarter-finals
5	Australia	4	0	1	3	6	25	−19	1	

Source: Paralympic.org

8 September 2016; 18:45	Australia	2–5	China	Future Arena, Rio de Janeiro; Referees: Vilma Basinkaite (LTU), Yoshinori Nii (JPN)
8 September 2016; 18:45	Horsburgh 1 Esdaile 1	Report	Zhang W. 4 Chen 1	Future Arena, Rio de Janeiro; Referees: Vilma Basinkaite (LTU), Yoshinori Nii (JPN)

10 September 2016; 14:30	China	2–7	Turkey	Future Arena, Rio de Janeiro; Referees: Dawna Christy (CAN), Nejc Jakic (SLO)
10 September 2016; 14:30	Zhang W. 1 Ju 1	Report	Altunoluk 7	Future Arena, Rio de Janeiro; Referees: Dawna Christy (CAN), Nejc Jakic (SLO)

12 September 2016; 18:15	China	8–3	Canada	Future Arena, Rio de Janeiro; Referees: Vilma Basinkaite (LTU), Yoshinori Nii (JPN)
12 September 2016; 18:15	Zhang W. 7 Ju 1	Report	Andrews 2 Morin 1	Future Arena, Rio de Janeiro; Referees: Vilma Basinkaite (LTU), Yoshinori Nii (JPN)

13 September 2016; 19:30	Ukraine	2–6	China	Future Arena, Rio de Janeiro; Referees: Bülent Kimyon (TUR), Vilma Basinkaite (LTU)
13 September 2016; 19:30	Rud 1 Miroshnyk 1	Report	Zhang W. 3 Chen 3	Future Arena, Rio de Janeiro; Referees: Bülent Kimyon (TUR), Vilma Basinkaite (LTU)

Quarter-finals

15 September 2016; 15:00	Brazil	3–4	China	Future Arena, Rio de Janeiro; Referees: Dawna Christy (CAN), Alexander Knecht (GER)
15 September 2016; 15:00	Custodio 2 Amorim 1	Report	Chen 3 Zhang W. 1	Future Arena, Rio de Janeiro; Referees: Dawna Christy (CAN), Alexander Knecht (GER)

Semi-finals

15 September 2016; 15:00	Brazil	3–4	China	Future Arena, Rio de Janeiro; Referees: Dawna Christy (CAN), Alexander Knecht (GER)
15 September 2016; 15:00	Custodio 2 Amorim 1	Report	Chen 3 Zhang W. 1	Future Arena, Rio de Janeiro; Referees: Dawna Christy (CAN), Alexander Knecht (GER)

Finals

16 September 2016; 18:30	China	1–4	Turkey	Future Arena, Rio de Janeiro; Referees: Vilma Basinkaite (LTU), Raili Sipura (FIN)
16 September 2016; 18:30	Chen 1	Report	Altunoluk 3 Yıldız 1	Future Arena, Rio de Janeiro; Referees: Vilma Basinkaite (LTU), Raili Sipura (FIN)

=== 2020 Tokyo ===
The team competed in the 2020 Summer Paralympics, with competition from Wednesday, 25 August, to the finals on Friday, 3 September 2021, in the Makuhari Messe arena, Chiba, Tokyo, Japan.

The following is the China roster in the women's goalball tournament of the 2020 Summer Paralympics.

No.	Player	Class	Date of birth (age)
1	Zhang Xiling	B3	17 June 1998 (aged 23)
2	Cao Zhenhua	B1	23 August 1997 (aged 24)
3	Chen Fengqing	B1	17 July 1985 (aged 36)
5	Zhang Wei	B1	22 December 1989 (aged 31)

Pos	Team	Pld	W	D	L	GF	GA	GD	Pts	Qualification
1	China	4	3	0	1	17	7	+10	9	Quarterfinals
2	Israel	4	2	0	2	22	14	+8	6	Quarterfinals
3	RPC	4	2	0	2	13	16	−3	6	Quarterfinals
4	Australia	4	2	0	2	9	21	−12	6	Quarterfinals
5	Canada	4	1	0	3	12	15	−3	3	

Source: TOCOG
Rules for classification: 1) points; 2) goal difference; 3) number of wins; 4) goals against; 5) head-to-head goal difference.

Round-robin

26 August 2021
10:30

China	3–4	RPC
Cao Zhenhua 3', 10'; Chen Fengqing 24'	Report	Arestova 3', 4', 12'; Gerasimova 3'

Makuhari Messe, Tokyo
Referee: Romualdas Vaitiekus (Lithuania), Launel Scott (Canada)

27 August 2021
14:45

Australia	0–6	China
	Report	Cao Zhenhua 9', 16'; Chen Fengqing 13'; Zhang Xiling 15', 21', 22'

Makuhari Messe, Tokyo
Referee: Launel Scott (Canada), Raili Sipura (Finland)

29 August 2021
14:45

Israel	1–4	China
Ben-David 5'	Report	Zhang Xiling 6', 6', 15'; Cao Zhenhua 24'

Makuhari Messe, Tokyo
Referee: Raili Sipura (Finland), Raquel Aguado Gómez (Spain)

30 August 2021
14:45

China	4–2	Canada
Chen Fengqing 2'; Zhang Xiling 3', 4', 22'	Report	Reinke 16'; Burk 18'

Makuhari Messe, Tokyo
Referee: Vaida Pokvytytė (Lithuania), Raili Sipura (Finland)

== World championships ==
=== 2010 Sheffield ===
The team competed in the 2010 World Championships, from 20 to 25 June 2010, in Sheffield, England, in Pool Y.

=== 2014 Espoo ===
The team competed in the 2014 World Championships from 30 June to 5 July 2014, in Espoo, Finland. They placed second in Pool Y, and lost to Russia in the quarter-finals, 1:4.

=== 2018 Malmö ===
The team competed in the 2018 World Championships from 3 to 8 June 2018, in Baltiska Hallen, Malmö, Sweden. They placed sixth in Pool D, and tenth in the final standings.

Athletes included Zhenhua Cao, Wang Chunhua, Chunyan Wang, Xiling Zhang, and coach Zhang Xiaopeng.

== IBSA World Games ==
=== 2003 Quebec City ===
The team competed in the 2003 IBSA World Games from 1 to 10 August 2011, in Quebec City, Canada. Ten teams competed. The first stage was pool play with five teams per pool and the top two teams in each pool advancing to the next round.

=== 2015 Seoul ===
The team competed in the 2015 IBSA World Games from 10 to 17 May 2015, in Seoul, South Korea. They played in Group A with seven out of seven wins, against Denmark, Finland, Ghana, Greece, Israel, Spain, and Ukraine. In the quarter-finals, they beat Japan 1:0, Australia 6:0, and in the finals were beaten by Israel 4:1, to take the silver medal.

== Regional championships ==
The team competed in IBSA Asia goalball region, and from January 2010 became part of the IBSA Asia-Pacific goalball competition region.

=== 2013 Beijing ===
The team competed in the 2013 IBSA Asia Pacific Goalball Regional Championships, from 11 to 16 November 2013, in Beijing, China. Of the four women's teams (Australia, China, Iran, Japan), China beat Japan 3:0, going into extra throws, to take the gold medal.

=== 2015 Hangzhou ===
The team competed in the 2015 IBSA Asia Pacific Goalball Regional Championships, from 8 to 12 November 2015, in the China National Goalball Training Centre, Hangzhou, China. Of the five women's teams (Australia, China, Japan, Mongolia, Thailand), China lost to Japan 0:1 in the gold medal match.

=== 2017 Bangkok ===
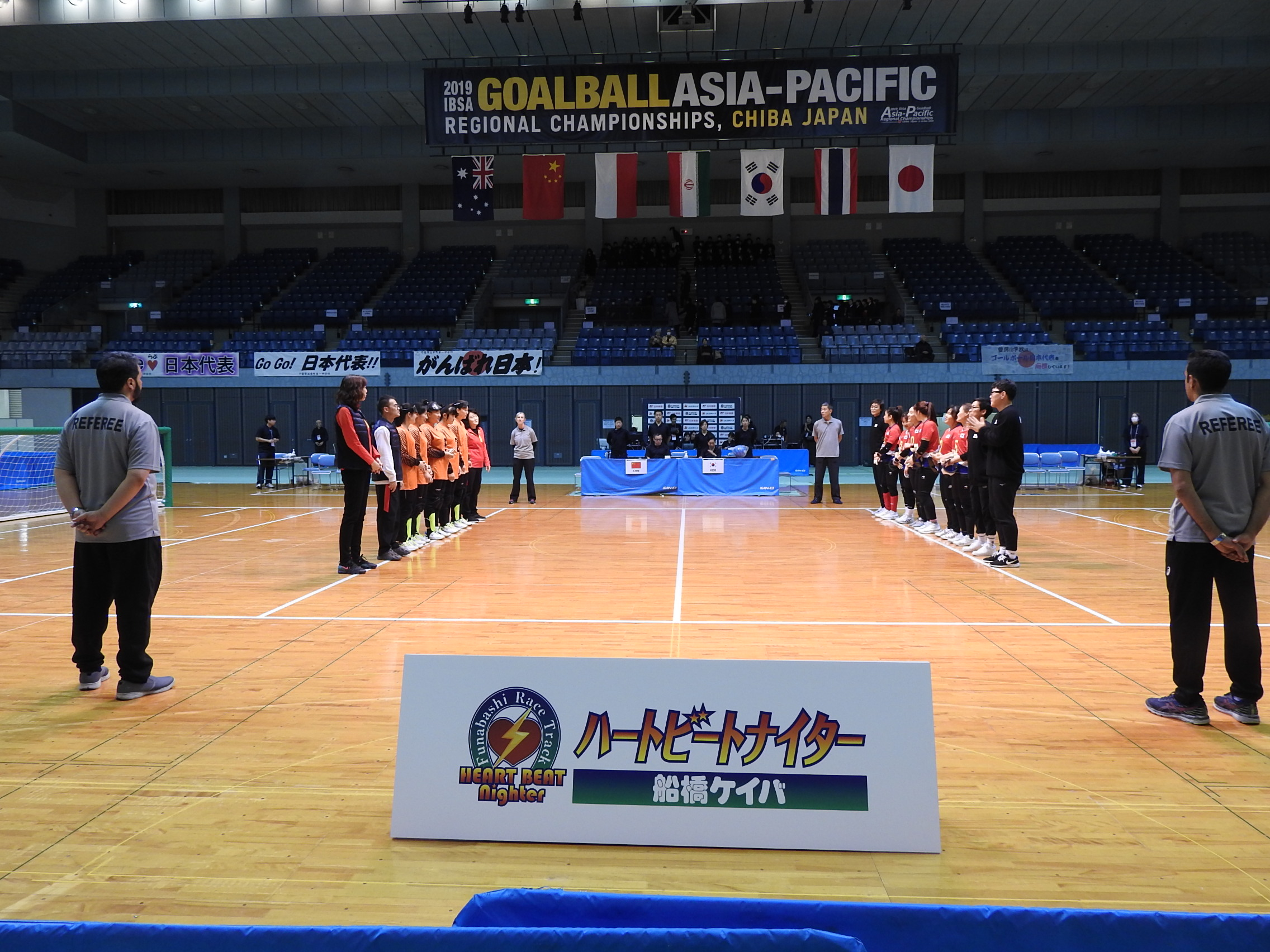
China and South Korea women's goalball teams lined up. IBSA Asia regional championships, Chiba city, Chiba, Japan (Dec 2019).

The team competed in the 2017 IBSA Asia/Pacific Goalball Regional Championships, from Monday, 21, to Saturday, 26 August 2017, in the Thai-Japan Sports Stadium, Din Daeng, Bangkok, Thailand. They lost to Japan 2:6 in the finals to take the silver medal.

=== 2019 Chiba ===
The team competed in the 2019 IBSA Goalball Asia-Pacific Regional Championships, from Thursday, 5, to Tuesday, 10 December 2019, in the Chiba Port Arena, Chiba, Japan. They beat South Korea in the semi-finals 9:1, but lost to Japan in the finals 1:2, to get the silver medal.

== FESPIC Games ==
In 2006, the team participated in the ninth and final FESPIC Games, held in Kuala Lumpur, Malaysia. They were one of three teams competing, the other two being Iran and Japan.

== Competitive history ==
The table below contains individual game results for the team in international matches and competitions.

Year	Event	Opponent	Date	Venue	Team	Team	Winner	Ref
2003	IBSA World Championships and Games	Ukraine	7 August	Quebec City, Canada	4	5	China	
2003	IBSA World Championships and Games	Spain	7 August	Quebec City, Canada	4	1	Spain	
2003	IBSA World Championships and Games	Brazil	7 August	Quebec City, Canada	3	5	Brazil	
2003	IBSA World Championships and Games	Algeria	7 August	Quebec City, Canada	10	0	China	
2006	FESPIC Games	Iran	24 November	Kuala Lumpur	1	11	China	
2006	FESPIC Games	Japan	25 November	Kuala Lumpur	5	2	China	
2006	FESPIC Games	Japan	27 November	Kuala Lumpur	1	1		
2006	FESPIC Games	Iran	29 November	Kuala Lumpur	8	4	China	
2006	FESPIC Games	Iran	30 November	Kuala Lumpur	8	2	China	

== See also ==
- Disabled sports
- China men's national goalball team
- China at the Paralympics
