= Roni Ohayon =

Israeli Paralympic goalball player

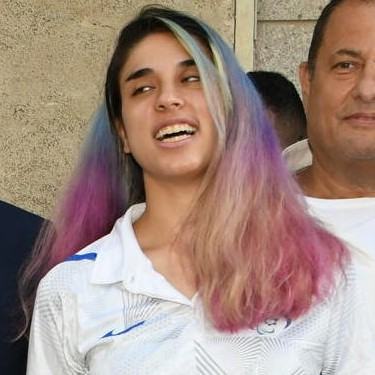

Personal information
- Native name: רוני אוחיון
- Born: 8 March 1999 (age 27) Beersheba, Israel

Sport
- Country: Israel
- Sport: Goalball
Medal record
Event	1st	2nd	3rd
Paralympic Games	0	1	0
IBSA World Games	1	0	1
Goalball World Championships	0	0	1
Goalball European Championships	0	2	2
Lady Intercup	1	2	0
Women's goalball
Representing Israel
Paralympic Games
Silver medal – second place	2024 Paris	Team
IBSA World Games
Gold medal – first place	2015 Seoul	Women's goalball
Bronze medal – third place	2019 Fort Wayne	Women's goalball
Goalball World Championships
Bronze medal – third place	2022 Matosinhos	Women's goalball
Goalball European Championships
Bronze medal – third place	2017 Finland	Women's goalball
Silver medal – second place	2019 Germany	Women's goalball
Bronze medal – third place	2021 Turkey	Women's goalball
Silver medal – second place	2023 Montenegro	Women's goalball
Lady & Men Intercup
Silver medal – second place	2022 Malmo	Women's goalball
Gold medal – first place	2022 Berlin	Women's goalball
Gold medal – first place	2024 Tokyo	Women's goalball
Gold medal – first place	2025 Berlin	Women's goalball

Roni Ohayon (Hebrew: רוני אוחיון; born 8 March 1999) is an Israeli Paralympic goalball player who plays a centre and for the Israeli national goalball team. She competed for Israel at the 2024 Paris Paralympics in the Women's goalball tournament, where she and Team Israel won a silver medal.

== Early life ==
Ohion was born on 8 March 1999 in Beersheba with a number of visual impairments including: blindness in the left eye, difficulty seeing in the distance in the right eye, vision in light and more. She has been involved in sports since childhood in athletics, including high jump, long jump and floor gymnastics for the visually impaired. In the 4th grade, she started practicing goalball at the center for the blind in Bere, but the group was closed after six months and reopened only when she entered the 8th grade.

== Goalball career ==
At the age of 13, Ohayon joined the reserve team and later moved up to the senior team. In May 2014, she participated in the first competition which was a preparatory competition for the World Championship which took place in July of that year. In 2016, she competed in the 2016 Summer Paralympics held in Rio de Janeiro. In 2021, she competed in the 2020 Summer Paralympics in Tokyo.

She competed for Israel at the 2024 Paris Paralympics in the Women's goalball tournament, where she and the Israel women's national goalball team won a silver medal.

== Personal life ==
Ohayon currently resides in Ramat Gan.
