= Israel women's national goalball team =

Israeli national team, for the Paralympic sport of goalball

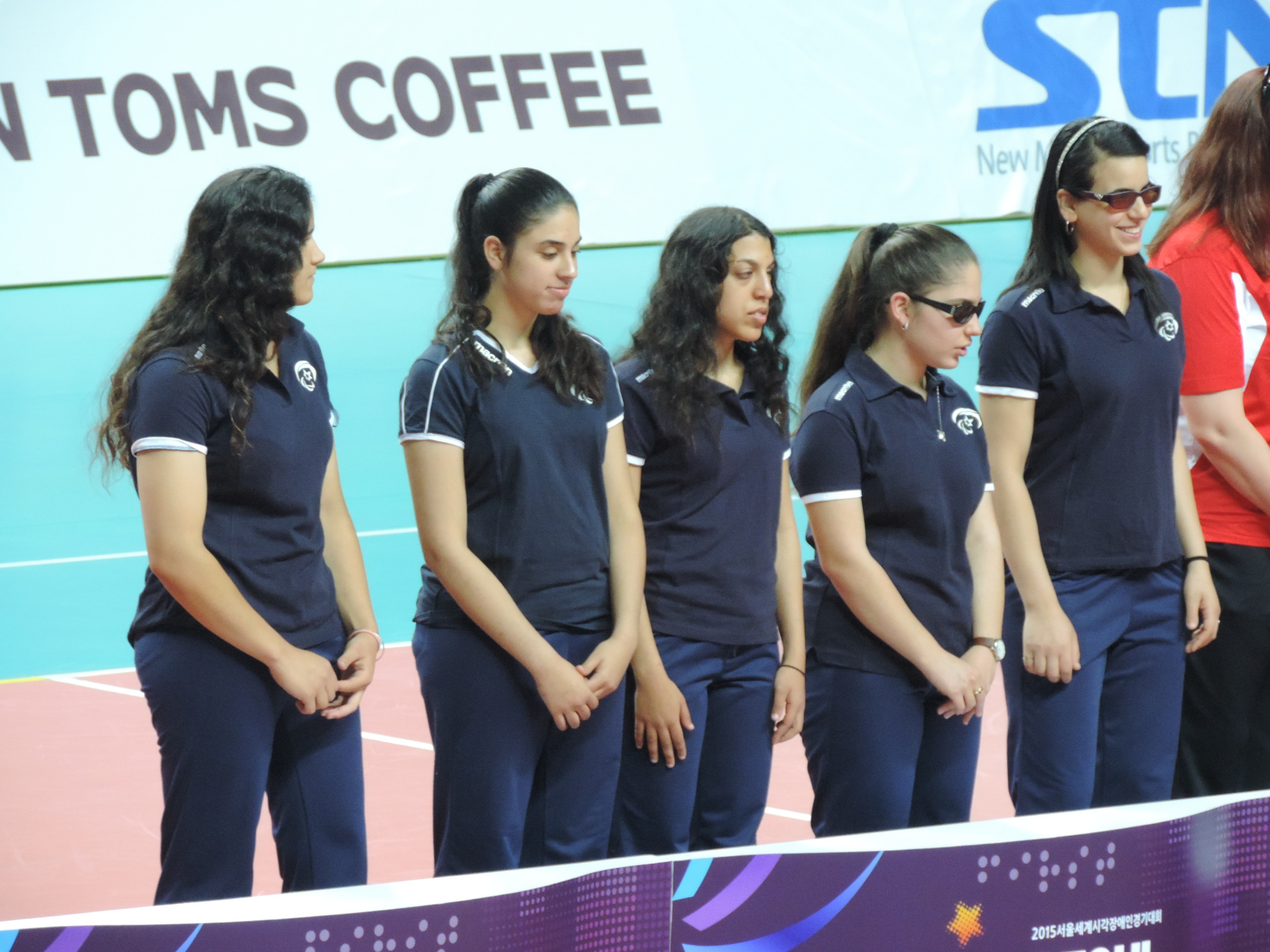
- Gold medal finalists at the IBSA World Games, Seoul, South Korea (May 2015).
- Sport: Goalball
- League: IBSA
- Division: Women
- Region: IBSA Europe
- Location: Israel
- Colours: Dark blue
- Championships: Paralympic Games medals: :0:1:0; World Championship medals: :0:0:1
- Parent group: Israel Paralympic Committee

Israel women's national goalball team is the women's national team of Israel. Goalball is a team sport designed specifically for athletes with a vision impairment. It takes part in international competitions. The team won the gold medal at the 2015 IBSA World Games, and the silver medal for Israel at the 2024 Paris Paralympics in the Women's goalball tournament.

== Paralympic Games ==
=== 2016 Rio de Janeiro ===
The team competed in the 2016 Summer Paralympics, with competition from Thursday 8 September to finals on Friday 16 September 2016, in the temporary Future Arena, Rio de Janeiro, Brazil.

The Algerian women's team did not show up in time for its matches against the United States or Israel. The team missed connecting flights in Rome after setting out from a training camp in Poland. There were suspicions of a boycott. The International Paralympic Committee's spokesman, Craig Spence, said: "They are still sticking to their story that they suffered the worst transport issues known to man. Whether we believe it is a question mark and we are looking into it." Their first two games were recorded as 10–0 walkover wins for the other team. The team of Algeria arrived in Rio on 11 September. Spence remarked: "Fingers crossed they can manage to travel from the (Athletes') Village to the goalball venue in less than six days."

The following is the Israel roster in the women's goalball tournament of the 2016 Summer Paralympics.

No.	Player	Class	Date of birth (age)
1	Elham Mahamid	B3	16 February 1990 (aged 26)
2	Yarden Adika	B3	14 July 1999 (aged 17)
3	Gal Hamrani	B1	1 December 1992 (aged 23)
5	Roni Ohayon	B2	8 March 1999 (aged 17)
6	Lihi Ben-David	B1	8 December 1995 (aged 20)
9	Sivan Abravaya	B2	13 August 1990 (aged 26)

Pos	Team	Pld	W	D	L	GF	GA	GD	Pts	Qualification
1	Brazil (H)	4	3	0	1	25	7	+18	9	Quarter-finals
2	United States	4	3	0	1	25	13	+12	9	Quarter-finals
3	Japan	4	2	1	1	13	8	+5	7	Quarter-finals
4	Israel	4	1	1	2	16	15	+1	4	Quarter-finals
5	Algeria	4	0	0	4	1	37	−36	0	

Source: Paralympic.org
(H) Hosts

8 September 2016; 14:30	Japan	1–1	Israel	Future Arena, Rio de Janeiro; Referees: Alexander Knecht (GER), Vilma Basinkaite (LTU)
8 September 2016; 14:30	Wakasugi 1	Report	Mahamid 1	Future Arena, Rio de Janeiro; Referees: Alexander Knecht (GER), Vilma Basinkaite (LTU)

10 September 2016; 18:45	Israel	10–0 (walkover)	Algeria

12 September 2016; 10:15	Brazil	7–2	Israel	Future Arena, Rio de Janeiro; Referees: Yoshinori Nii (JPN), Raquel Aguado (ESP)
12 September 2016; 10:15	Amorim 4 Custodio 3	Report	Mahamid 2	Future Arena, Rio de Janeiro; Referees: Yoshinori Nii (JPN), Raquel Aguado (ESP)

13 September 2016; 09:00	Israel	3–7	United States	Future Arena, Rio de Janeiro; Referees: Raquel Aguado (ESP), Dawna Christy (CAN)
13 September 2016; 09:00	Ben-David 3	Report	Miller 4 Czechowski 2 Dennis 1	Future Arena, Rio de Janeiro; Referees: Raquel Aguado (ESP), Dawna Christy (CAN)

Quarter-finals

14 September 2016; 15:45	Turkey	15–5	Israel	Future Arena, Rio de Janeiro; Referees: Dawna Christy (CAN), Raquel Aguado (ESP)
14 September 2016; 15:45	Altunoluk 7 Özcan 4 Mercan 3 Ben-David 1 (o.g.)	Report	Ben-David 5	Future Arena, Rio de Janeiro; Referees: Dawna Christy (CAN), Raquel Aguado (ESP)

=== 2020 Tokyo ===
The team was selected for Tokyo 2020 following the 2019 European Championships in Rostock, Germany. First place Turkey had already qualified through second place in the 2018 World Championships.

Team captain Elham Mahamid Ruzin, who has the eye disease achromatopsia, is married to the Israel men's national goalball team captain, Michael Ruzin.

The following is the Israel roster in the women's goalball tournament of the 2020 Summer Paralympics.

No.	Player	Class	Date of birth (age)
1	Elham Mahamid	B3	16 February 1990 (aged 31)
2	Noa Malka	B3	15 June 2003 (aged 18)
3	Gal Hamrani	B1	1 December 1992 (aged 28)
4	Or Mizrahi	B3	7 May 1993 (aged 28)
5	Roni Ohayon	B2	8 March 1999 (aged 22)
6	Lihi Ben-David	B1	8 December 1995 (aged 25)

Pos	Team	Pld	W	D	L	GF	GA	GD	Pts	Qualification
1	China	4	3	0	1	17	7	+10	9	Quarterfinals
2	Israel	4	2	0	2	22	14	+8	6	Quarterfinals
3	RPC	4	2	0	2	13	16	−3	6	Quarterfinals
4	Australia	4	2	0	2	9	21	−12	6	Quarterfinals
5	Canada	4	1	0	3	12	15	−3	3	

Source: TOCOG
Rules for classification: 1) points; 2) goal difference; 3) number of wins; 4) goals against; 5) head-to-head goal difference.

Round-robin

25 August 2021
19:00

Israel	11–1	Australia
Mizrahi 1'; Ben-David 2', 2', 5', 7', 7', 14', 16'; Mahamid 18', 18'	Report	Horsburgh 10'

Makuhari Messe, Tokyo
Referee: Raili Sipura (Finland), Launel Scott (Canada)

26 August 2021
20:30

Canada	6–2	Israel
Reinke 9', 13', 14', 16'; Salehizadeh 18', 22'	Report	Mizrahi 18'; Ben-David 23'

Makuhari Messe, Tokyo
Referee: Bas Spaans (Netherlands), Romualdas Vaitiekus (Lithuania)

28 August 2021
17:30

RPC	3–8	Israel
Arestova 9', 20'; Chudina 16'	Report	Mahamid 1', 1'; Mizrahi 2', 3'; Ben-David 16', 19', 24', 24'

Makuhari Messe, Tokyo
Referee: Robert Avery (Great Britain), Romualdas Vaitiekus (Lithuania)

29 August 2021
14:45

Israel	1–4	China
Ben-David 5'	Report	Zhang Xiling 6', 6', 15'; Cao Zhenhua 24'

Makuhari Messe, Tokyo
Referee: Raili Sipura (Finland), Raquel Aguado Gómez (Spain)

== World Championships ==
=== 2010 Sheffield ===
The team competed in the 2010 World Championships, from 20 to 25 June 2010, in Sheffield, England, in Group X.

=== 2014 Espoo ===
The team competed in the 2014 World Championships from 30 June to 5 July 2014, in Espoo, Finland. They placed fourth in Pool Y, and lost to Turkey in the quarter-finals, 10:2.

Athletes: Elham Mahamid (#1), Yarden Adika (#3), Roni Ohayon (#5), Lihi Ben-David (#6), Chen Mazliach (#7).

=== 2018 Malmö ===
The team competed in the 2018 World Championships from 3 to 8 June 2018, in Malmö, Sweden. They placed fifth in Pool C, and eleventh in overall final standings.

Athletes included: Elham Mahamid, Lihi Ben-David.

=== 2022 Matosinhos ===
The team competed in the 2022 World Championships from 7 to 16 December 2022, at the Centro de Desportos e Congressos de Matosinhos, Portugal. There were sixteen men's and sixteen women's teams. They placed first in Pool B, and fourth in final standings.

== IBSA World Games ==
=== 2015 Seoul ===
The team competed in the 2015 IBSA World Games from 10 to 17 May 2015, in Seoul, South Korea. Taking first, beating China 4:1, this allowed them to qualify for the 2016 Rio de Janeiro Paralympic Games.

== Regional championships ==
The team competes in IBSA Europe goalball region, although geographically in the IBSA Asia region.

=== 2009 Munich (Group A) ===
Munich, Germany hosted the 2009 European Championships with eleven teams taking part. The team finished the event in sixth place. The team competed at the 2013 European Championships in Turkey, where they finished third.

Athletes: Lihi Yehudith Ben-David, Gal Hamrani, Elham Mahamid, Chen Mazliach, and Or Mizrachi.

=== 2013 Konya (Group A) ===
The team competed in the 2013 IBSA Goalball European Championships, Group A, from 1 to 11 November 2013, at Konya, Turkey. They beat Finland in the bronze medal game, 5:3.

=== 2015 Lithuania (Group A) ===
The team competed in the 2015 IBSA Goalball European A Championships in Lithuania. They lost the bronze medal game to Ukraine, 4:5.

=== 2017 Pajulahti (Group A) ===
The team competed in the 2017 IBSA Goalball European A Championships from 15 to 23 September 2017, at Pajulahti, Nastola, Finland. They placed third behind Turkey and winners Russia.

Athletes included: Lihi Ben-David, Elham Mahamid.

=== 2019 Rostock (Group A) ===
The team competed in the 2019 IBSA Goalball European A Championships from 5 to 14 October 2019, in Rostock, Germany. They placed second in the final standings. This earned them a slot at the 2020 Tokyo Paralympic Games as Turkey already had a slot.

Athletes included: Lihi Ben-David, Noa Malka, Or Mizrahi, and Roni Ohayon.

== Competitive history ==
The table below contains individual game results for the team in international matches and competitions.

Year	Event	Opponent	Date	Venue	Team	Team	Winner	Ref
2009	IBSA Goalball European Championships	Finland	24 August	Munich, Germany	1	4	Finland	
2009	IBSA Goalball European Championships	Spain	25 August	Munich, Germany	1	6	Israel	
2009	IBSA Goalball European Championships	Great Britain	26 August	Munich, Germany	0	7	Great Britain	
2009	IBSA Goalball European Championships	Germany	26 August	Munich, Germany	0	4	Germany	
2009	IBSA Goalball European Championships	Turkey	27 August	Munich, Germany	4	10	Israel	
2009	IBSA Goalball European Championships	Greece	28 August	Munich, Germany	1	2	Greece	
2009	IBSA Goalball European Championships	Russia	28 August	Munich, Germany	7	9	Israel	
2009	IBSA Goalball European Championships	Sweden	29 August	Munich, Germany	6	2	Sweden	
2013	IBSA Goalball European Championships	Germany	1–11 November	Konya, Turkey	1	8	Israel	
2013	IBSA Goalball European Championships	Turkey	1–11 November	Konya, Turkey	7	4	Israel	
2013	IBSA Goalball European Championships	Spain	1–11 November	Konya, Turkey	3	4	Spain	
2013	IBSA Goalball European Championships	Denmark	1–11 November	Konya, Turkey	6	4	Israel	
2013	IBSA Goalball European Championships	Ukraine	7 November	Konya, Turkey	5	4	Israel	
2013	IBSA Goalball European Championships	Russia	8 November	Konya, Turkey	3	0	Russia	
2013	IBSA Goalball European Championships	Finland	8 November	Konya, Turkey	3	5	Israel	

=== Goal scoring by competition ===
Player	Goals	Competition	Notes	Ref
Or Mizrahi	12	2009 IBSA Goalball European Championships		
Elham Mahamid	5	2009 IBSA Goalball European Championships		
Gal Hamrani	1	2009 IBSA Goalball European Championships		
Lihi Ben-David	0	2009 IBSA Goalball European Championships		
Chen Mazliach	5	2009 IBSA Goalball European Championships		

== See also ==
- Disabled sports
- Israel men's national goalball team
- Israel at the Paralympics
