= Sevtap Altunoluk =

Turkish Paralympic goalball player

Personal information
- Born: 10 January 1995 (age 31) Tokat, Turkey

Sport
- Sport: Goalball
Medal record
Women's goalball
Representing Turkey
Paralympic Games
Gold medal – first place	2020 Tokyo	Team
Gold medal – first place	2024 Paris	Team
IBSA European Championships
Gold medal – first place	2019 Rostock	Team
Silver medal – second place	2021 Samsun	Team

Sevtap Altunoluk (born 10 January 1995) is a Turkish Paralympian goalball player having visual impairment. She was a member of the national team taking part at the 2020 Summer Paralympics. She is a native of Tokat in Turkey.

Her sister Sevda Altunoluk is also a national goalball player.

She played with the national team, which won the gold medal at the 2019 European Goalball Championship in Rostock, Germany.

== Honours ==
=== International ===
- (gold) 2019 IBSA Goalball European Championship in Rostock, Germany.
- (gold) 2020 Summer Paralympics in Tokyo, Japan
- (silver) 2021 IBSA Goalball European Championship in Samsun, Turkey.
