= Kátia Aparecida Ferreira Silva =

Brazilian goalball athlete (born 1995)

Personal information
- Born: 24 April 1995 (age 31) Unaí, Minas Gerais, Brazil

Sport
- Country: Brazil
- Sport: Women's Goalball
- Disability class: B1
Medal record
Representing Brazil
Parapan American Games
Bronze medal – third place	2023 Santiago	Team

Kátia Aparecida Ferreira Silva (born 24 April 1995) is a Brazilian goalball player.

== Early life ==
Silva was born in Unaí, Minas Gerais. She has congenital glaucoma, but only discovered the problem at the age of thirteen after suffering a hemorrhage caused by eye pressure. The news that she would be blind for the rest of her life caused her to suffer depression that led to a suicide attempt in her hometown. She moved to Brasília in 2015, where she discovered goalball.

== Career ==
Silva began playing professionally in 2016. In 2019, she was the Brazilian champion of the Série B playing for CETEFE (Special Physical Education Training Center). At the end of 2019, she was called up for the Brazilian national team for the first time.

At the 2020 Summer Paralympics in Tokyo, the Brazilian team reached the bronze medal match, but lost to Japan 6-1.

In May 2023, the team participated in the Malmö Cup in Sweden and won the bronze medal. In October, the team was called up for the 2023 Parapan American Games in Santiago, which took place in November.
