= Moniza de Lima =

Brazilian goalball athlete (born 1998)

Personal information
- Born: Moniza Aparecida de Lima; 16 April 1998 (age 28) Recife, Brazil

Sport
- Sport: Women's goalball
- Disability class: B1
Medal record
Representing Brazil
World Championships
Bronze medal – third place	2018 Malmö	Team
IBSA World Games
Bronze medal – third place	2023 São Paulo	Team
Parapan American Games
Bronze medal – third place	2023 Santiago	Team

Moniza Aparecida de Lima (born 16 April 1998) is a Brazilian goalball player. She is part of the Brazilian women's national team.

== Biography ==
Lima was born with glaucoma. and she was introduced to goalball at the ICB-BA (Instituto do Conhecimento da Bahia), after a teacher recommended her, in 2013. She was called up for the first time in 2017 and won a silver medal at the Copa América. The following year, she won the bronze medal at the World Championship (Malmo) in 2018, and in 2022, the gold medal at the Americas Championship. She participated in the 2020 Summer Paralympics in Tokyo. For the women's national team, Moniza was called up for the first phase of training in 2023, at the Paralympic Training Center in São Paulo. It was the first meeting of the men's and women's teams since the World Championships in December last year, in which the men won their third championship and the women came in ninth place. She also participated in the Malmö Cup, in the same year, where the Brazilian team won bronze again.
