= Berfin Altan =

Turkish Paralympic goalball player

Personal information
- Born: 24 November 2003 (age 22) Denizli, Turkey

Sport
- Sport: Goalball
Medal record
Women's goalball
Representing Turkey
Paralympic Games
Gold medal – first place	2024 Paris	Team
IBSA European Championships
Silver medal – second place	2021 Samsun	Team

Berfin Altan (born 24 November 2003) is a Turkish goalball player having visual impairment. She was a member of the national team at the 2021 IBSA European Goalball Championship.

She is a high school student at the School for the Blind and Visually Impaired "Durmuş Ali Çoban Anadolu Lisesi" in Denizli, Turkey. She is a member of the school goalball team.

After playing chess and performing judo, she switched to goalball in 2016. She has been called up to the Turkey women's national goalball team camps since 2018. She took part at the 2021 IBSA Goalball European Championship held in Samsun, Turkey. She enjoyed her team's silver medal title.

== Honours ==
=== International ===
- (silver) 2021 IBSA Goalball European Championship in Samsun, Turkey.
