= Ori Mizrahi =

Israeli Paralympic goalball player

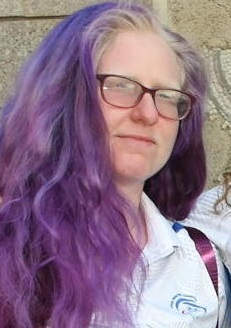

Personal information
- Native name: אורי מזרחי

Sport
- Country: Israel
- Sport: Goalball
Medal record
Event	1st	2nd	3rd
Paralympic Games	0	1	0
IBSA World Games	0	0	1
Goalball World Championships	0	0	1
Goalball European Championships	0	2	1
Lady Intercup	1	2	0
Women's goalball
Representing Israel
Paralympic Games
Silver medal – second place	2024 Paris	Team
IBSA World Games
Bronze medal – third place	2019 Fort Wayne	Women's goalball
Goalball World Championships
Bronze medal – third place	2022 Matosinhos	Women's goalball
Goalball European Championships
Silver medal – second place	2019 Germany	Women's goalball
Bronze medal – third place	2021 Turkey	Women's goalball
Silver medal – second place	2023 Montenegro	Women's goalball
Lady & Men Intercup
Silver medal – second place	2022 Malmo	Women's goalball
Gold medal – first place	2022 Berlin	Women's goalball
Silver medal – second place	2023 Malmo	Women's goalball

Or (Ori) Mizrahi (Hebrew: אורי מזרחי; born 1993) is an Israeli Paralympic goalball player. She competed for Israel at the 2024 Paris Paralympics in the Women's goalball tournament, where she and the Israel women's national goalball team won a silver medal.

== Early life ==
Mizrahi was born with albinism and has visual impairment. She was raised in Holon and completed higher studies in physical education.

== Goalball career ==
Mirzahi began playing goalball at age 12 and joined the Israel women's national goalball team.

Prior to the 2014 Goalball World Championships Mizrahi was examined and classified with improved eyesight, causing her to be disqualified from competitions and to retire from the national team. This decision was overturned in 2019 after further medical examinations, and she took part in the 2019 IBSA World Games and Goalball European Championships, qualifying the team to take part in the 2020 Summer Paralympics.

She competed for Israel at the 2024 Paris Paralympics in the Women's goalball tournament, where she and the Israel women's national goalball team won a silver medal.
