= Amy Burk =

Canadian goalball player (born 1990)

Personal information
- Born: 17 March 1990 (age 36) Charlottetown, Prince Edward Island, Canada
- Home town: Ottawa, Ontario, Canada

Sport
- Country: Canada
- Sport: Goalball
- Disability: Albinism
Medal record
Women's Goalball
Representing Canada
World Championships
Gold medal – first place	2006	Team
Gold medal – first place	2011	Team
Bronze medal – third place	2015	Team
Parapan American Games
Gold medal – first place	2023 Santiago	Team
Bronze medal – third place	2011 Guadalajara	Team
Bronze medal – third place	2015 Toronto	Team
Bronze medal – third place	2019 Lima	Team

Amy Burk (née Kneebone, born 17 March 1990) is a Canadian goalball player who competes in international level events. She is a three time Parapan American Games bronze medalist and double World champion.
