= Lihi Ben-David =

Israeli Paralympic goalball player

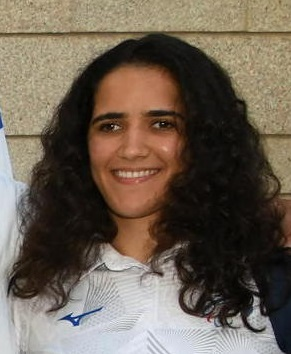

Personal information
- Native name: ליהיא בן-דוד

Sport
- Country: Israel
- Sport: Goalball
Medal record
Event	1st	2nd	3rd
Paralympic Games	0	1	0
IBSA World Games	1	0	1
Goalball World Championships	0	0	1
Goalball European Championships	0	2	2
Lady Intercup	1	2	0
Women's goalball
Representing Israel
Paralympic Games
Silver medal – second place	2024 Paris	Team
IBSA World Games
Gold medal – first place	2015 Seoul	Women's goalball
Bronze medal – third place	2019 Fort Wayne	Women's goalball
Goalball World Championships
Bronze medal – third place	2022 Matosinhos	Women's goalball
Goalball European Championships
Bronze medal – third place	2017 Finland	Women's goalball
Silver medal – second place	2019 Germany	Women's goalball
Bronze medal – third place	2021 Turkey	Women's goalball
Silver medal – second place	2023 Montenegro	Women's goalball
Lady & Men Intercup
Silver medal – second place	2022 Malmo	Women's goalball
Gold medal – first place	2022 Berlin	Women's goalball
Silver medal – second place	2023 Malmo	Women's goalball

Lihi Ben-David (Hebrew: ליהיא בן-דוד; born 8 December 1995) is an Israeli Paralympic goalball player. She competed for Israel at the 2024 Paris Paralympics in the Women's goalball tournament, where she and the Israel women's national goalball team won a silver medal.

== Early life ==
Ben-David suffers from macular degeneration and is aided by a guide dog. She has a twin brother Or Ben-David who plays for the Israel men's national goalball team.

Ben-David completed Sherut Leumi. She studied physical education at Wingate Institute and is a goalball coach in Jerusalem and Beersheba.

== Goalball career ==
Ben-David began playing goalball at age 11 and joined the Israel women's national goalball team.

In 2015 she scored the winning goal at the IBSA World Games, with the team winning a gold medal and ensuring their spot at the 2016 Summer Paralympics. Throughout the 2019 Goalball European Championship Ben-David scored 32 goals and the Israeli national team reached second place and ensured its place at the 2020 Summer Paralympics.

She competed for Israel at the 2024 Paris Paralympics in the Women's goalball tournament, where she and the Israel women's national goalball team won a silver medal.
