= Goalball at the 2020 Summer Paralympics – Women's team rosters =

This article shows the rosters of all participating teams at the women's goalball tournament at the 2020 Summer Paralympics in Tokyo.

== Group C ==
=== Australia ===
The following is the Australia roster in the women's goalball tournament of the 2020 Summer Paralympics.

No.	Player	Class	Date of birth (age)
1	Jennifer Blow	B3	10 April 1991 (aged 30)
2	Tyan Taylor	B3	23 March 1990 (aged 31)
3	Amy Ridley	B2	10 July 2002 (aged 19)
7	Raissa Martin	B3	3 March 1991 (aged 30)
8	Meica Horsburgh	B3	24 February 1989 (aged 32)
9	Brodie Smith	B3	8 August 1998 (aged 23)

=== Canada ===
The following is the Canada roster in the women's goalball tournament of the 2020 Summer Paralympics.

No.	Player	Class	Date of birth (age)
1	Maryam Salehizadeh	B2	September 21, 1986 (aged 34)
3	Whitney Bogart	B3	April 21, 1986 (aged 35)
4	Meghan Mahon	B3	January 15, 1996 (aged 25)
5	Emma Reinke	B3	June 22, 1998 (aged 23)
6	Brieann Baldock	B3	December 14, 1995 (aged 25)
7	Amy Burk	B3	March 17, 1990 (aged 31)

=== China ===
The following is the China roster in the women's goalball tournament of the 2020 Summer Paralympics.

No.	Player	Class	Date of birth (age)
1	Zhang Xiling	B3	17 June 1998 (aged 23)
2	Cao Zhenhua	B1	23 August 1997 (aged 24)
3	Chen Fengqing	B1	17 July 1985 (aged 36)
5	Zhang Wei	B1	22 December 1989 (aged 31)

=== Israel ===
The following is the Israel roster in the women's goalball tournament of the 2020 Summer Paralympics.

No.	Player	Class	Date of birth (age)
1	Elham Mahamid	B3	16 February 1990 (aged 31)
2	Noa Malka	B3	15 June 2003 (aged 18)
3	Gal Hamrani	B1	1 December 1992 (aged 28)
4	Or Mizrahi	B3	7 May 1993 (aged 28)
5	Roni Ohayon	B2	8 March 1999 (aged 22)
6	Lihi Ben-David	B1	8 December 1995 (aged 25)

=== RPC ===
The following is the RPC roster in the women's goalball tournament of the 2020 Summer Paralympics.

No.	Player	Class	Date of birth (age)
1	Arina Gerasimova	B3	7 January 1998 (aged 23)
2	Evengiia Semina	B2	16 April 1994 (aged 27)
5	Anastasiia Mazur	B3	28 June 1990 (aged 31)
7	Irina Arestova	B3	14 September 1995 (aged 25)
8	Iuliia Khrapkova	B3	18 June 1996 (aged 25)
9	Anastasiia Chudina	B3	8 January 1994 (aged 27)

== Group D ==
=== Brazil ===
The following is the Brazil roster in the women's goalball tournament of the 2020 Summer Paralympics.

No.	Player	Class	Date of birth (age)
2	Ana Gabriely Assunção	B3	15 August 1990 (aged 30)
3	Ana Carolina Custódio	B2	23 April 1987 (aged 33)
5	Moniza Aparecida de Lima	B2	16 April 1998 (aged 22)
7	Kátia Aparecida Ferreira Silva	B1	24 April 1995 (aged 25)
8	Jéssica Gomes	B3	22 July 1993 (aged 27)
9	Victória Amorim	B1	29 November 1997 (aged 22)

=== Egypt ===
The following is the Egypt roster in the women's goalball tournament of the 2020 Summer Paralympics.

No.	Player	Class	Date of birth (age)
1	Hanan Tolba	B1	20 November 1995 (aged 25)
2	Esraa Walid Ezzeldin	B2	27 July 2002 (aged 19)
3	Gehad Ezzeldin	B2	8 July 1999 (aged 22)
4	Israa Gadalla	B2	1 March 2003 (aged 18)
5	Hassnaa Elgabry	B2	4 March 1996 (aged 25)
6	Aya Ahmed	B1	6 December 1995 (aged 25)

=== Japan ===
The following is the Japan roster in the women's goalball tournament of the 2020 Summer Paralympics.

No.	Player	Class	Date of birth (age)
1	Yuki Temma	B1	26 July 1990 (aged 31)
2	Rie Urata	B1	1 July 1977 (aged 44)
3	Eiko Kakehata	B3	19 February 1993 (aged 28)
6	Norika Hagiwara	B2	2 February 2001 (aged 20)
7	Rieko Takahashi	B1	20 March 1998 (aged 23)
8	Haruka Wakasugi	B1	23 August 1995 (aged 26)

=== Turkey ===
The following is the Turkey roster in the women's goalball tournament of the 2020 Summer Paralympics.

No.	Player	Class	Date of birth (age)
1	Fatma Gül Güler	B2	12 February 2004 (aged 17)
2	Reyhan Yılmaz	B2	18 November 2001 (aged 19)
3	Sevda Altunoluk	B2	1 April 1994 (aged 27)
4	Şeydanur Kaplan	B2	23 March 2000 (aged 21)
6	Kader Çelik	B2	1 January 2001 (aged 20)
7	Sevtap Altunoluk	B2	10 January 1995 (aged 26)

=== United States ===
The following is the United States roster in the women's goalball tournament of the 2020 Summer Paralympics.

No.	Player	Class	Date of birth (age)
3	Lisa Czechowski	B2	May 29, 1979 (aged 42)
4	Asya Miller	B3	October 16, 1979 (aged 41)
5	Amanda Dennis	B2	February 5, 1994 (aged 27)
6	Mindy Cook	B3	September 23, 1988 (aged 32)
7	Eliana Mason	B2	September 1, 1995 (aged 25)
9	Marybai Huking	B2	November 11, 1996 (aged 24)

== See also ==
- Goalball at the 2020 Summer Paralympics – Men's team rosters
