= Goalball classification =

Disability sport classification system

Goalball classification is the classification system for goalball. Goalball players with a disability are classified into different categories based on their vision based disability type. The classification is handled by the International Blind Sports Association.

== Definition ==
Goalball classification at the Paralympic Games is the basis for determining who can compete in the sport, and within which class. It is used for the purposes of establishing fair competition. Entry is eligible to male and female athletes with a visual disability in one of the three blind sport classifications: B1, B2 and B3. The blind classifications are based on medical classification, no functional classification. This sport has rules that were designed specifically with people with disabilities in mind.

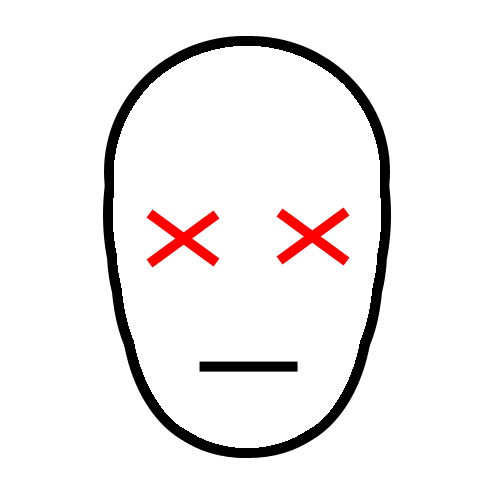
Visualisation of functional vision for a B1 competitor

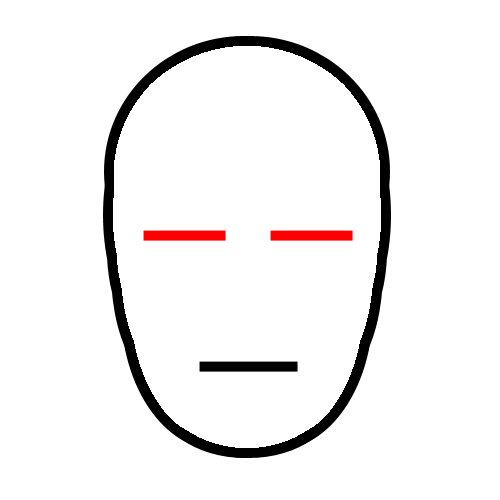
Visualisation of functional vision for a B2 competitor

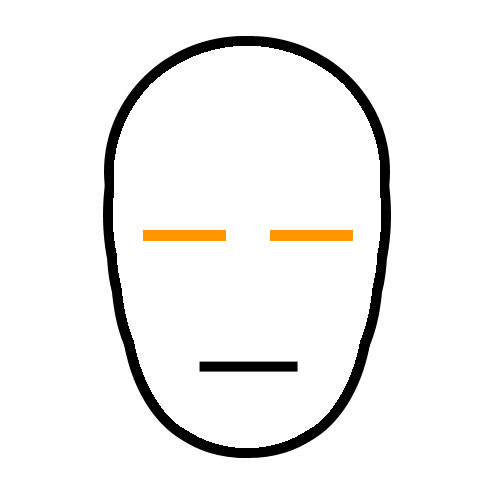
Visualisation of functional vision for a B3 competitor

== Governance ==
The sport is governed by the International Blind Sports Association. In Australia, the Australian Paralympic Committee is the National Federation for the sport.

== Eligibility ==
As of 2012, people with visual disabilities are eligible to compete in this sport. Both men and women are eligible to play.

== History ==
The sport was created by the International Blind Sports Association as one intentionally not based on able-bodied sport. It was created to deal with specific needs of blind sport competitors.

The sport was created in 1946 for veterans who were blind. In 1992, the International Paralympic Committee formally took control of governance for disability sport.

== Classes ==
Athletes are classified by their degree of visual impairment as follows:

- B1. Athletes are unable to perceive light in either eye — or have limited perception of light and are not able to "recognise the form of a hand at any distance and in any direction".
- B2. Athletes are able to "recognise the form of a hand to a visual acuity of 2/60 and/or a visual field of less than 5 degrees".
- B3. Athletes have a "visual acuity of above 2/60 to a visual acuity of 6/60 and/or a visual field or more than 5 degrees and less than 20 degrees".

All athletes wear blindfolds while playing to ensure even level of plays amongst competitors with different degrees of visual impairment.

== Process ==
Goalball assessment looks at a player's audio-spatial orientation during assessment. For Australian competitors in this sport, the sport and classification is managed by the Australian Paralympic Committee. There are three types of classification available for Australian competitors: Provisional, national and international. The first is for club level competitions, the second for state and national competitions, and the third for international competitions.

== At the Paralympic Games ==
The sport was first played at the Paralympics as a medal sport in 1980. It had appeared in 1976 as a demonstration sport. At the 1992 Summer Paralympics, blind people were eligible to participate, with classification being run through IBSA, with all participants wearing goggles. At the 2000 Summer Paralympics, 19 assessments were conducted at the Games. This resulted in 5 class changes. Goalball competition at the London 2012 Summer Paralympics will be held at Copper Box (Olympic Park) from 30 August to 7 September. Sixty women and seventy-two men will compete for two medal events. A maximum of one men's team and one women's team per country is allowed, with six athletes per team. All competitors will wear eyeshades to ensure visual impairment equality.

For the 2016 Summer Paralympics in Rio, the International Paralympic Committee had a zero classification at the Games policy. This policy was put into place in 2014, with the goal of avoiding last minute changes in classes that would negatively impact athlete training preparations. All competitors needed to be internationally classified with their classification status confirmed prior to the Games, with exceptions to this policy being dealt with on a case-by-case basis.

== Prominent athletes ==
Goalball players include Jennifer Blow, Meica Christensen, Michelle Rzepecki, Nicole Esdaile, Rachel Henderson and Tyan Taylor.

== Future ==
Going forward, disability sport's major classification body, the International Paralympic Committee, is working on improving classification to be more of an evidence-based system as opposed to a performance-based system so as not to punish elite athletes whose performance makes them appear in a higher class alongside competitors who train less.
