= Amy Ridley =

Australian Paralympic goalballer (born 2002)

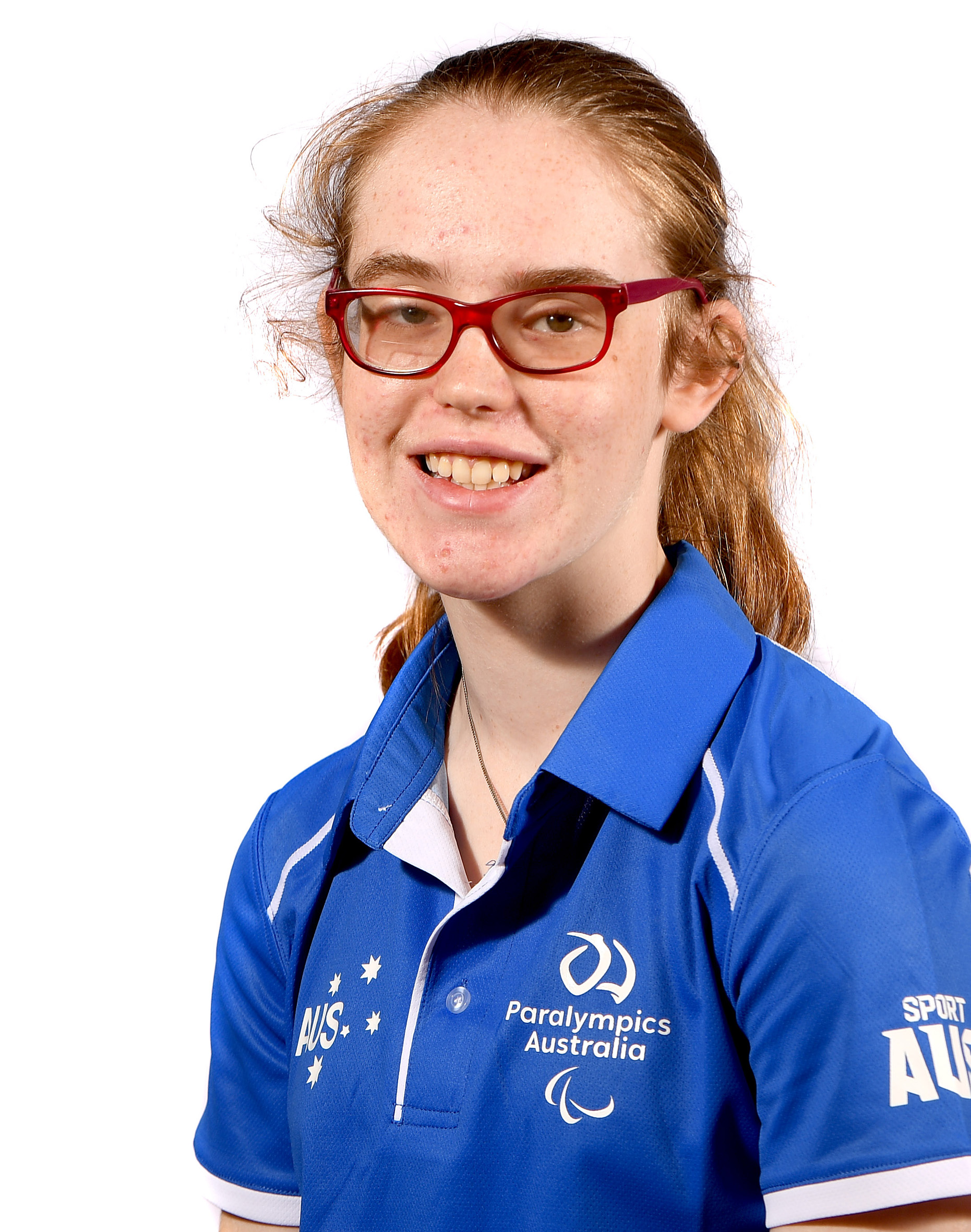
- Ridley in 2019

Personal information
- Nationality: Australian
- Born: 10 July 2002 (age 24)

Sport
- Country: Australia
- Sport: Goalball
- Team: Aussie Belles
- Coached by: Peter Corr

Amy Ridley (born 10 July 2002) is an Australian goalball athlete. She represented Australia at the 2020 Summer Paralympics.

== Personal life ==
Ridley was born on 10 July 2002. At the age of six she was diagnosed with panuveitis, an autoimmune disease. She attended Turramurra High School. In 2021, she is a full-time student, studying law and business, and working casually as an academic tutor. Her father is Andrew Ridley.

== Goalball ==
In 2017, Ridley took up goalball as part of the Goalball 4 Schools program in New South Wales. She was a member of the Australian team that won the silver medal at the 2019 Youth World Championships. In November 2020, she was awarded the Sport NSW Young Coach of the Year Award for her services to goalball.

At the 2020 Summer Paralympics, Ridley and the other members of the Belles team comprising Meica Horsburgh, Raissa Martin, Jennifer Blow, Brodie Smith, and Tyan Taylor won two group stage games out of four and qualified for the quarterfinals. The team lost to Turkey 10-6 and failed to win a medal.

== See also ==
- Australia women's national goalball team
