= Australia women's national goalball team =

Australian national team, for the Paralympic sport of goalball

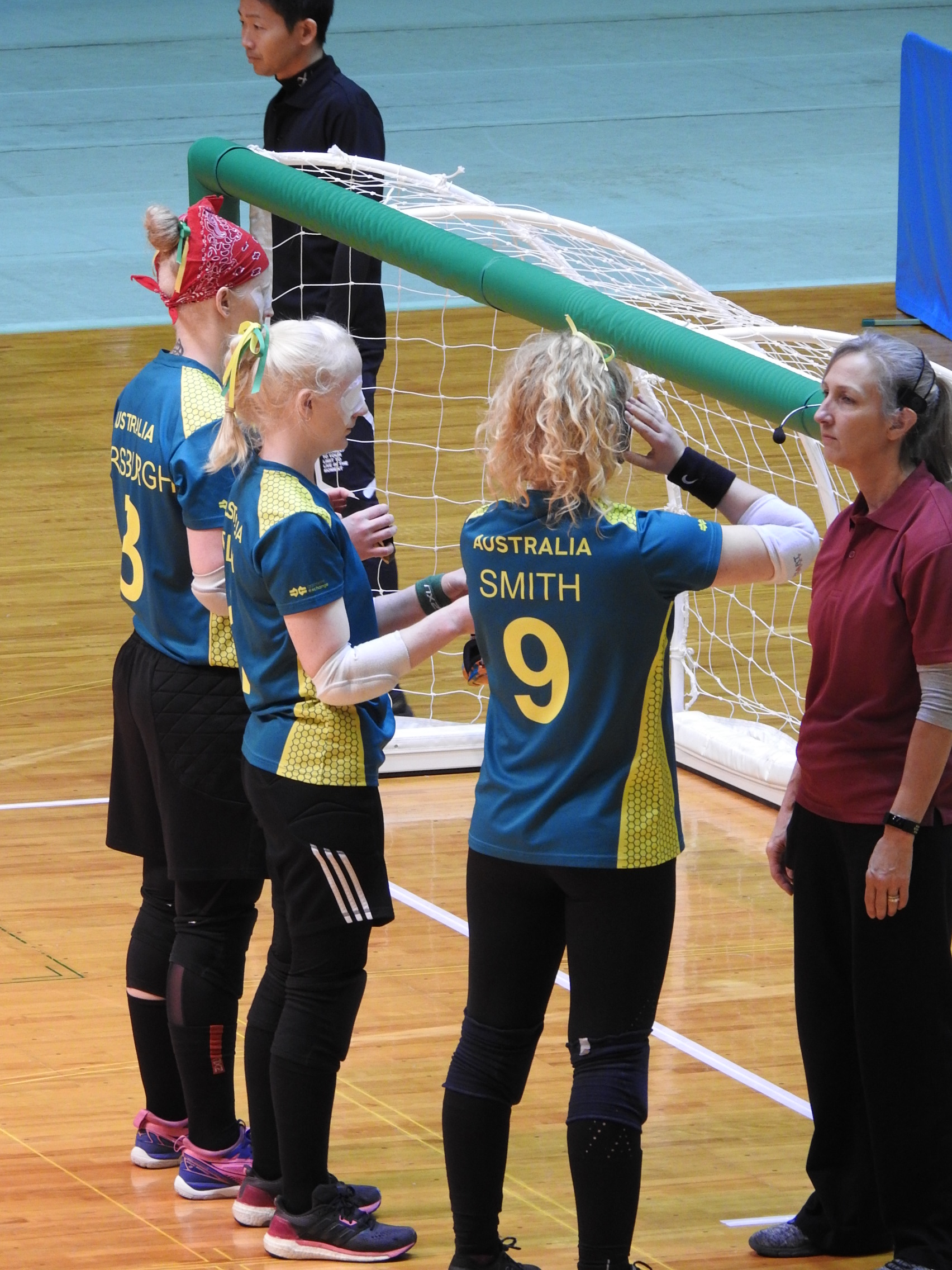
- Undergoing eyeshade checks at start of the first half. Regional championships, Chiba, Japan (2019).
- Nicknames: Aussie Belles
- Short name: Belles
- Sport: Goalball
- Founded: 1986
- League: IBSA
- Division: Women
- Region: IBSA Oceania
- Location: Australia
- Colours: Green, Gold
- Head coach: Peter Corr (2012–2022)
- Championships: Paralympic Games medals:: 0: 0: 0 World Championship medals:: 0: 0: 0
- Parent group: Goalball Australia; Blind Sports Australia; Paralympics Australia
- Website: www.goalballaustralia.org

Goalball is a team sport designed specifically for athletes with a vision impairment. Australia commenced its involvement in the sport in 1980. Its women's team has completed in trans-Tasman competitions, the IBSA World Goalball Championships, and the Paralympic Games.

About 2015, the women's squad adopted the name 'Aussie Belles', whilst the men's squad became 'Aussie Storm'.

== Training ==
In 1998 and 1999, the University of Western Sydney's Macarthur Department of Sport Studies was active in helping the team develop and implement a training program. This training was implemented around Geoff Pearce and Oatsy Tremayne's book Psychological and Physical Training Programs of Goalballers.

== Paralympic Games ==
=== 1996 Atlanta ===
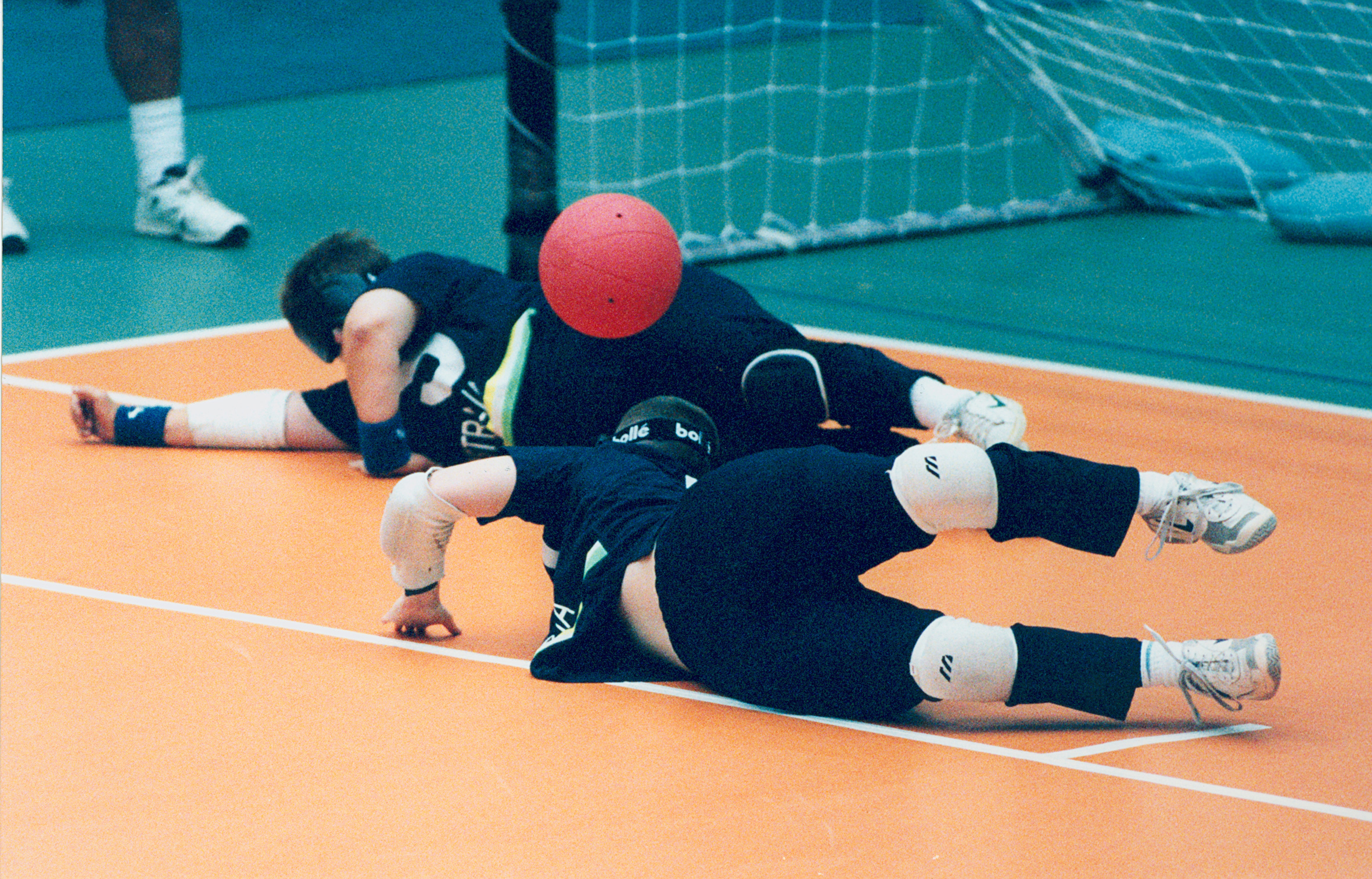
Sarah Kennedy (Qld) defending (1996 Games.

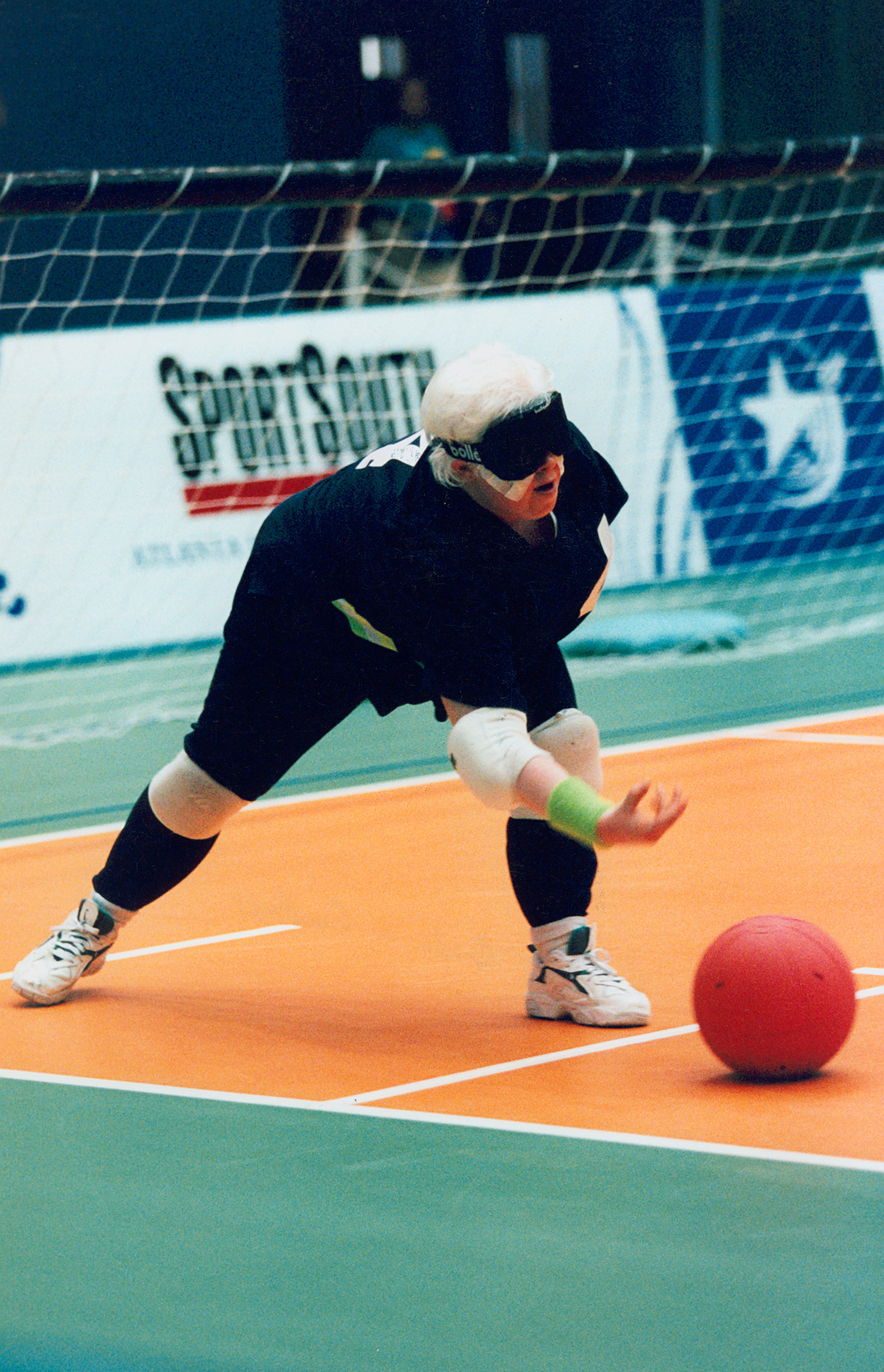
Raelene Bock (NSW) throwing (1996 Games).

The women's Australian team did not have as much experience as other teams in the 1996 Paralympics. European teams had competed against each other in the lead up to the games. This gave them an advantage as they knew their opponents strengths and weaknesses. The Australian women had several injuries during the Paralympics. Sarah Kennedy injured herself in training, which limited her mobility. Australia lost all but one match in 1996. They lost to Spain 0–1, to Sweden 0–4, to Denmark 1–5, to Germany 0–2 and to the USA 0–3. Australia's sole victory came against Korea, where they won 2–0. Australia finished as the last team in the competition based on goals for and against as they had a record of 3–16. The 0–1 loss to Finland was considered impressive by goalball followers because Finland won a silver medal.

=== 2000 Sydney ===
Paralympian athletes: Penny Bennett, Kerrie-ann King, Jo Ruba, Robyn Stephens.
Officials: Terry Kenaghan (head coach).

The women's team finished eighth.

=== 2004 Athens ===
Australia did not qualify.

=== 2008 Beijing ===
Australia did not qualify.

=== 2012 London ===
Paralympian athletes: Jennifer Blow, Meica Christensen (Captain), Tyan Taylor, Nicole Esdaile, Rachel Henderson, Michelle Rzepecki.
Officials: Peter Corr (section manager), Georgina Kenaghan (coach), Eliza Kwan (physiotherapist).

The team went into the Games ranked eighth in the world and was the first Australian goalball team to qualify for the Paralympic sport since Atlanta in 1996. It competed in Group B against China, United States, Sweden, Japan and Canada. The Australian men's team did not qualify after losing the Africa Oceania Goalball Regional Championships 5–4 against Algeria.

The following is the Australia roster in the women's goalball tournament of the 2012 Summer Paralympics.

No.	Player	Age
1	Jennifer Blow	21
2	Tyan Taylor	22
3	Nicole Esdaile	25
4	Rachel Henderson	20
6	Michelle Rzepecki	25
8	Meica Christensen	23

==== Results ====
Group play

Team	Pld	W	D	L	GF	GA	GD	Pts	Qualification
Canada	4	3	0	1	6	3	+3	9	Quarterfinals
Japan	4	2	1	1	5	3	+2	7	Quarterfinals
Sweden	4	2	1	1	11	11	0	7	Quarterfinals
United States	4	2	0	2	9	4	+5	6	Quarterfinals
Australia	4	0	0	4	7	17	−10	0	Eliminated

Source: "London 2012 Paralympic Games - Goalball results" (PDF). Paralympic.org. 3 October 2012 – via Goalball.sport.

31 August 2012; 09:00	Australia	1 – 3	Japan	Copper Box, London; Referees: Hooshang Shariati (IRI), Yasser Omar (EGY)
31 August 2012; 09:00	Esdaile 1	Report	Adacho 2 Komiya 1	Copper Box, London; Referees: Hooshang Shariati (IRI), Yasser Omar (EGY)

2 September 2012; 10:15	Australia	1 – 3	Canada	Copper Box, London; Referees: Juha Vuokila (FIN), Dina Murdie (GBR)
2 September 2012; 10:15	Christensen 1	Report	Kneebone 2 Morin 1	Copper Box, London; Referees: Juha Vuokila (FIN), Dina Murdie (GBR)

3 September 2012; 18:30	United States	3 – 0	Australia	Copper Box, London; Referees: Thomas Baerz (GER), Bulent Kimyon (TUR)
3 September 2012; 18:30	Armbruster 3	Report		Copper Box, London; Referees: Thomas Baerz (GER), Bulent Kimyon (TUR)

4 September 2012; 12:30	Sweden	8 – 5	Australia	Copper Box, London; Referees: Hooshang Shariati (IRI), Janne Ahokas (FIN)
4 September 2012; 12:30	Gustavsson 5 Naesström 2 Jälmestål 1	Report	Esdaile 3 Christensen 2	Copper Box, London; Referees: Hooshang Shariati (IRI), Janne Ahokas (FIN)

=== 2016 Rio ===
Paralympian athletes: Jennifer Blow, Nicole Esdaile, Meica Horsburgh, Raissa Martin, Michelle Rzepecki, Tyan Taylor.
Officials: Peter Corr (coach), Robert Vogt (team leader).

Australian women's team originally failed to qualify after finishing third at the IBSA Goalball Asia Pacific Championships in Hangzhou, China.^{[15]} Australian men's team failed to qualify after finishing fifth at the IBSA Goalball Asia Pacific Championships in Hangzhou, China. Following the re-allocation of Russia's spot due to their disqualification, Australia's women found themselves getting a last minute invite to Rio. Australia's women enter the tournament ranked ninth in the world.

The following is the Australia roster in the women's goalball tournament of the 2016 Summer Paralympics.

No.	Player	Class	Date of birth (age)
1	Jennifer Blow	B3	10 April 1991 (aged 25)
2	Tyan Taylor	B3	23 March 1990 (aged 26)
3	Nicole Esdaile	B3	1 June 1987 (aged 29)
6	Michelle Rzepecki	B3	6 November 1986 (aged 29)
7	Raissa Martin	B3	3 March 1991 (aged 25)
8	Meica Horsburgh	B3	24 February 1989 (aged 27)

==== Results ====
Pos	Team	Pld	W	D	L	GF	GA	GD	Pts	Qualification
1	Turkey	4	4	0	0	37	11	+26	12	Quarter-finals
2	China	4	3	0	1	21	14	+7	9	Quarter-finals
3	Canada	4	2	0	2	16	22	−6	6	Quarter-finals
4	Ukraine	4	0	1	3	9	17	−8	1	Quarter-finals
5	Australia	4	0	1	3	6	25	−19	1	

Source: Paralympic.org

8 September 2016; 18:45	Australia	2–5	China	Future Arena, Rio de Janeiro; Referees: Vilma Basinkaite (LTU), Yoshinori Nii (JPN)
8 September 2016; 18:45	Horsburgh 1 Esdaile 1	Report	Zhang W. 4 Chen 1	Future Arena, Rio de Janeiro; Referees: Vilma Basinkaite (LTU), Yoshinori Nii (JPN)

10 September 2016; 10:15	Ukraine	2–2	Australia	Future Arena, Rio de Janeiro; Referees: Bülent Kimyon (TUR), Daniel Voltan (BRA)
10 September 2016; 10:15	Rud 2	Report	Horsburgh 1 Esdaile 1	Future Arena, Rio de Janeiro; Referees: Bülent Kimyon (TUR), Daniel Voltan (BRA)

11 September 2016; 18:45	Australia	2–12	Turkey	Future Arena, Rio de Janeiro; Referees: Joelle Boulet (CAN), Raili Sipura (FIN)
11 September 2016; 18:45	Horsburgh 2	Report	Özcan 5 Mercan 5 Yıldız 1 Altunoluk 1	Future Arena, Rio de Janeiro; Referees: Joelle Boulet (CAN), Raili Sipura (FIN)

13 September 2016; 15:30	Canada	6–0	Australia	Future Arena, Rio de Janeiro; Referees: Daniel Voltan (BRA), Raili Sipura (FIN)
13 September 2016; 15:30	Burk 6	Report		Future Arena, Rio de Janeiro; Referees: Daniel Voltan (BRA), Raili Sipura (FIN)

=== 2020 Tokyo ===
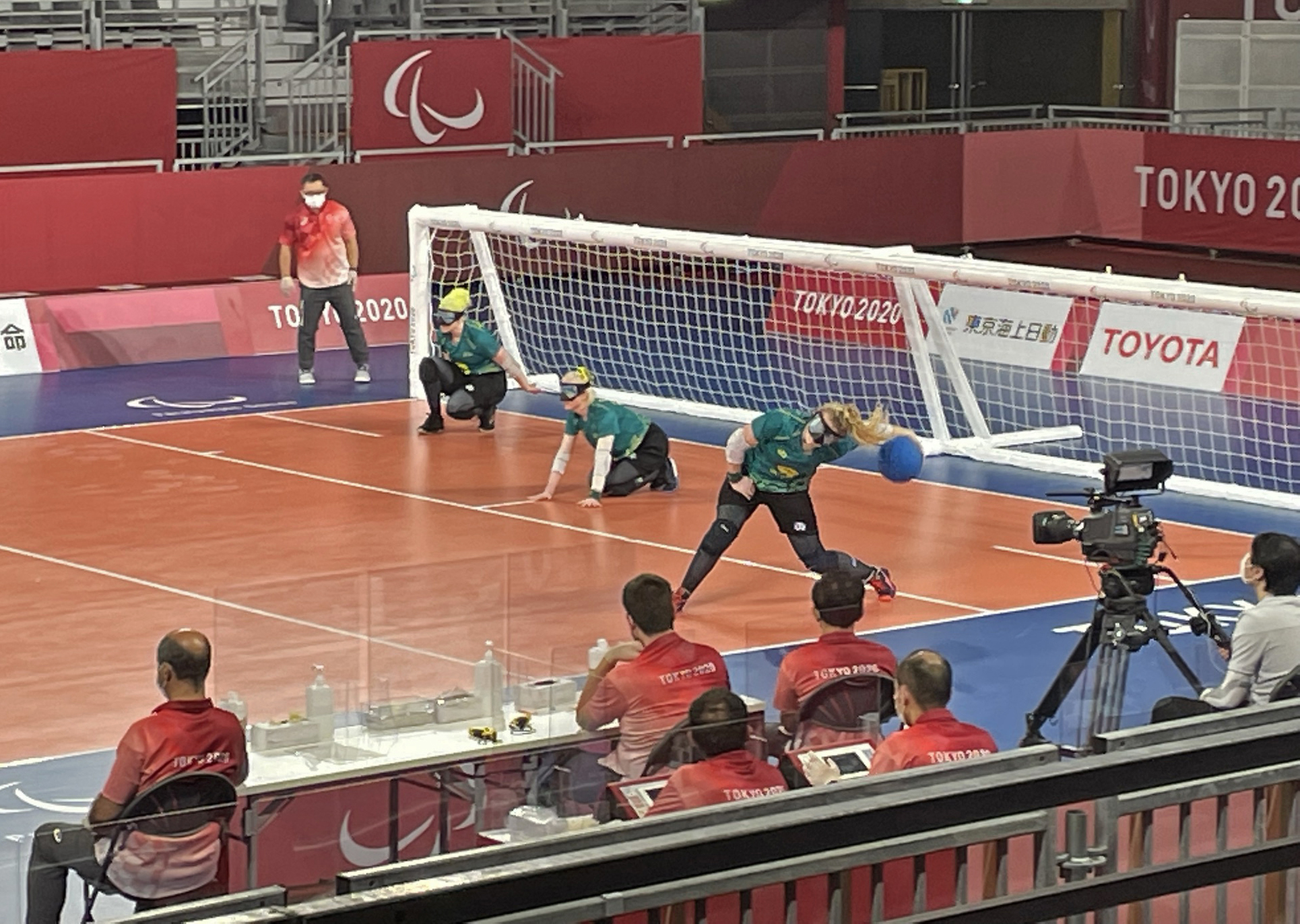
Australian Belles in action at the 2020 Tokyo Paralympics

Paralympian athletes: Jennifer Blow, Meica Horsburgh, Raissa Martin, Amy Ridley, Brodie Smith, Tyan Taylor.
Officials: Peter Corr (coach), Simon Smith (assistant coach).

Australian women's team qualified by coming fourth at the 2019 IBSA Goalball Paralympic Ranking Tournament at Fort Wayne, USA.

The following is the Australia roster in the women's goalball tournament of the 2020 Summer Paralympics.

No.	Player	Class	Date of birth (age)
1	Jennifer Blow	B3	10 April 1991 (aged 30)
2	Tyan Taylor	B3	23 March 1990 (aged 31)
3	Amy Ridley	B2	10 July 2002 (aged 19)
7	Raissa Martin	B3	3 March 1991 (aged 30)
8	Meica Horsburgh	B3	24 February 1989 (aged 32)
9	Brodie Smith	B3	8 August 1998 (aged 23)

Pos	Team	Pld	W	D	L	GF	GA	GD	Pts	Qualification
1	China	4	3	0	1	17	7	+10	9	Quarterfinals
2	Israel	4	2	0	2	22	14	+8	6	Quarterfinals
3	RPC	4	2	0	2	13	16	−3	6	Quarterfinals
4	Australia	4	2	0	2	9	21	−12	6	Quarterfinals
5	Canada	4	1	0	3	12	15	−3	3	

Source: TOCOG
Rules for classification: 1) points; 2) goal difference; 3) number of wins; 4) goals against; 5) head-to-head goal difference.

Round-robin

25 August 2021
19:00

Israel	11–1	Australia
Mizrahi 1'; Ben-David 2', 2', 5', 7', 7', 14', 16'; Mahamid 18', 18'	Report	Horsburgh 10'

Makuhari Messe, Tokyo
Referee: Raili Sipura (Finland), Launel Scott (Canada)

27 August 2021
14:45

Australia	0–6	China
	Report	Cao Zhenhua 9', 16'; Chen Fengqing 13'; Zhang Xiling 15', 21', 22'

Makuhari Messe, Tokyo
Referee: Launel Scott (Canada), Raili Sipura (Finland)

28 August 2021
09:00

Canada	3–4	Australia
Salehizadeh 16'; Reinke 24', 24'	Report	Horsburgh 12', 18', 19', 23'

Makuhari Messe, Tokyo
Referee: Raili Sipura (Finland), Reza Dehghan (Iran)

29 August 2021
19:00

Australia	4–1	RPC
Horsburgh 1', 5', 19'; Smith 9'	Report	Arestova 19'

Makuhari Messe, Tokyo
Referee: Bas Spaans (Netherlands), Vaida Pokvytytė (Lithuania)

Quarter-finals

1 September 2021
13:15

Turkey	10–6	Australia
Sevd. Altunoluk 1', 3', 4', 6', 6', 9', 17', 17'; Güler 5'; Çelik 24'	Report	Horsburgh 2', 11', 20', 21', 24'; Smith 5'

Makuhari Messe, Tokyo
Referee: Woradet Kultawongwattana (Thailand), Launel Scott (Canada)

== World championships ==
=== 1986 Roermond ===
The 1986 IBSA World Goalball Championships were held in Roermond, the Netherlands. The team was one of ten teams participating, and they finished eighth overall. The 1998 World Championships were held in Madrid, Spain. The team was one of eleven teams participating, and they finished tenth overall.

=== 1998 Madrid ===
The national team finished tenth at the 1998 IBSA World Goalball Championships held in Madrid, Spain.

=== 2006 Spartanburg ===
The team competed in the 2006 World Championships, in July 2006, in Spartanburg, South Carolina, United States of America.

=== 2010 Sheffield ===
The Australian women's national goalball team had a top eight finish at the 2010 World Championships in Sheffield, England. The national team had not played in an international competition for two years starting around 2008 until the 2010 Championships.

=== 2014 Espoo ===
The team competed in the 2014 World Championships from 30 June to 5 July 2014, in Espoo, Finland. In Pool Y, they did not make the quarter-finals. In their five games, they lost to Brazil 5:9, Israel 2:6, China 1:2, Ukraine 2:7, but beat Sweden 4:1.

=== 2018 Malmö ===
Athletes for the event were: Jennifer Blow, Meica Christensen, Nikita Grosser (South Australia), Alison Jones (Queensland), Michelle Rzepecki, and Brodie Smith (New South Wales). Head coach was Peter Corr (Victoria), assistant coach and manager Simon Smith (New South Wales), and sports masseuse Kerri Caruso. In Pool C, they ranked fourth, lost to Brazil 2:5 in the quarter-finals, coming eighth in overall standings.

=== 2022 Matosinhos ===
The team competed in the 2022 World Championships from 7 to 16 December 2022, at the Centro de Desportos e Congressos de Matosinhos, Portugal. There were sixteen men's and sixteen women's teams. They placed sixth in Pool B, and eleventh in final standings.

== Regional championships ==
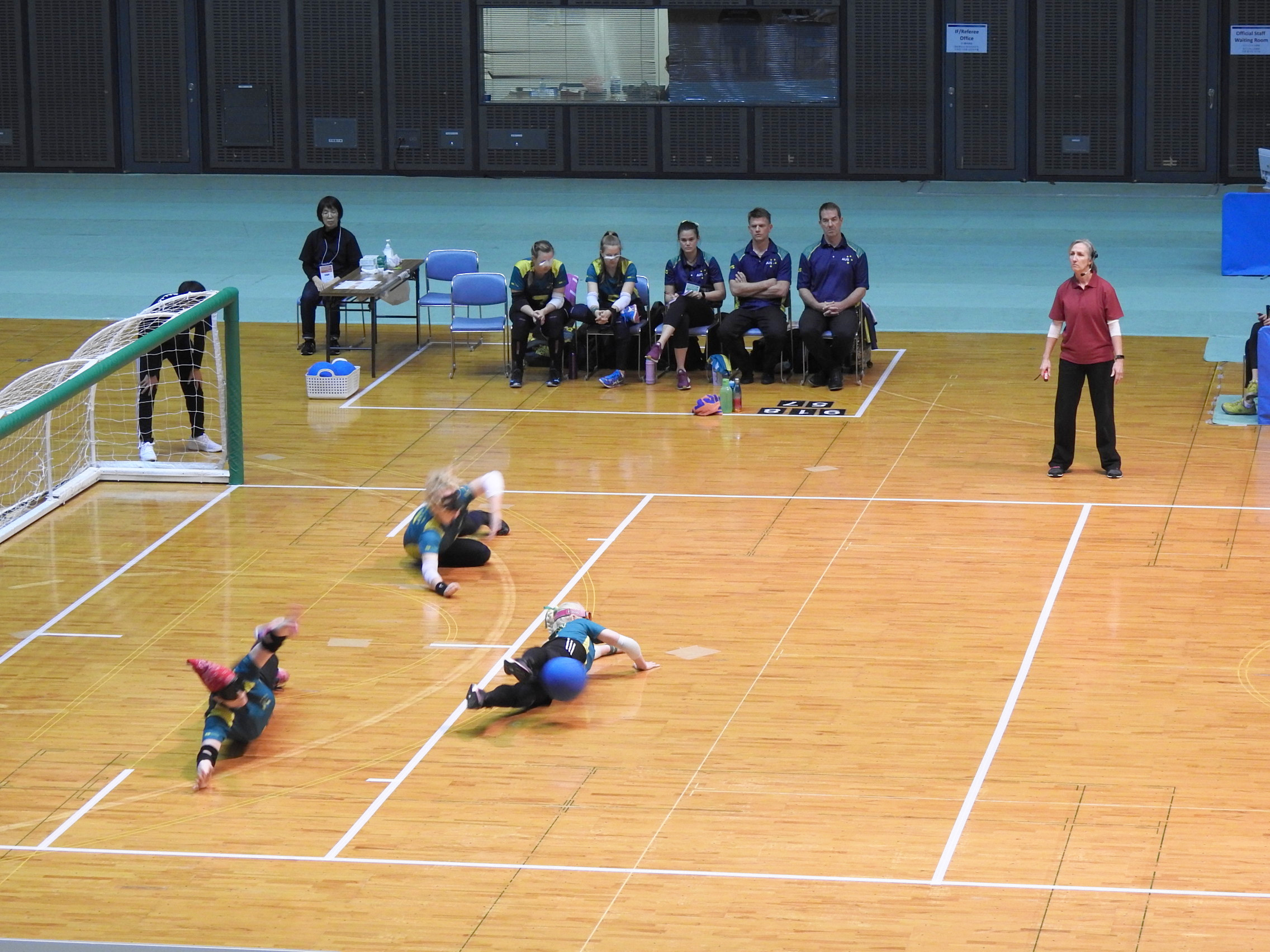
Australia defending against Japan. Regional championships, Chiba, Japan (2019).

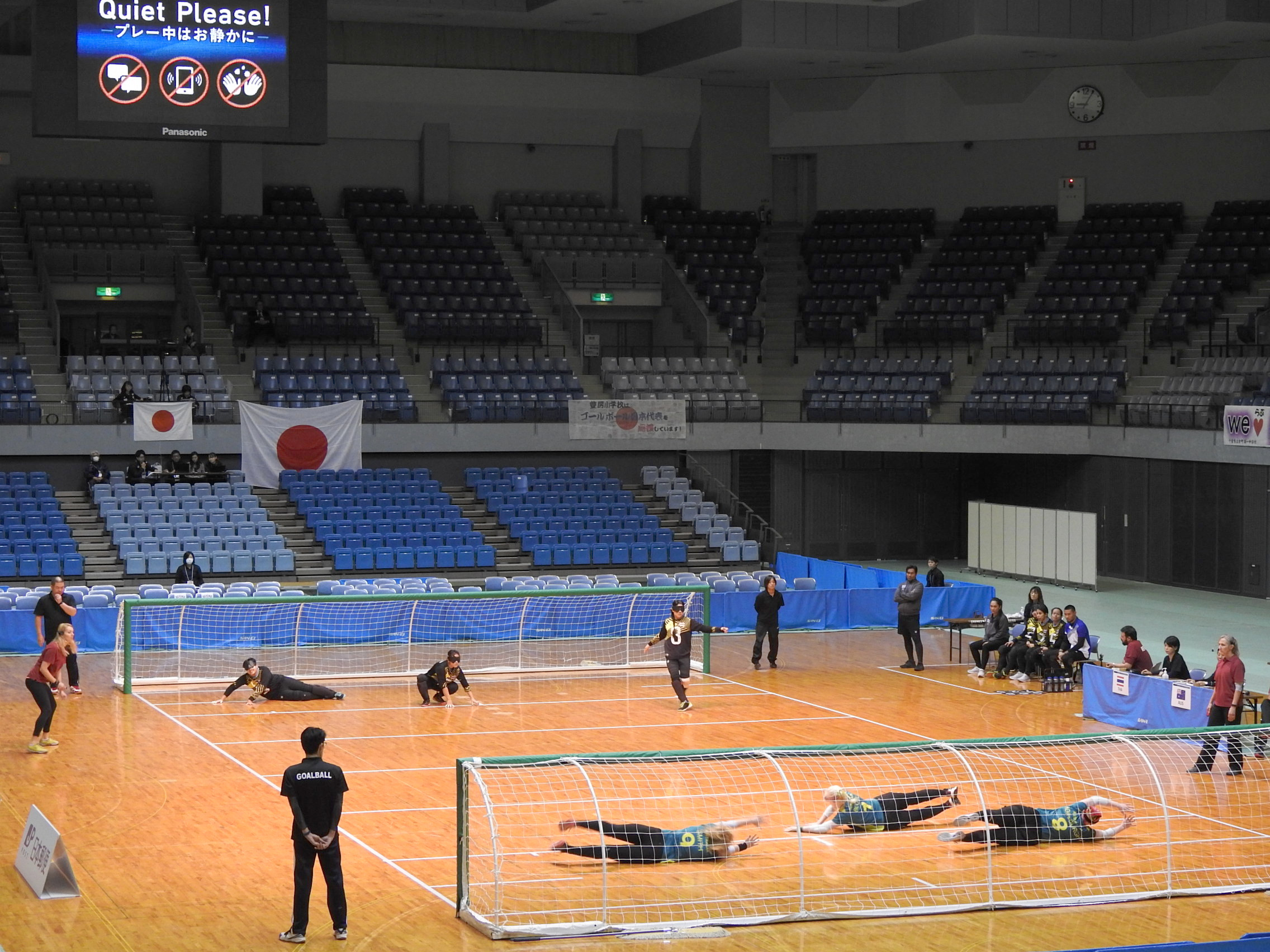
Australia defending against Thailand. Regional championships, Chiba, Japan (2019).

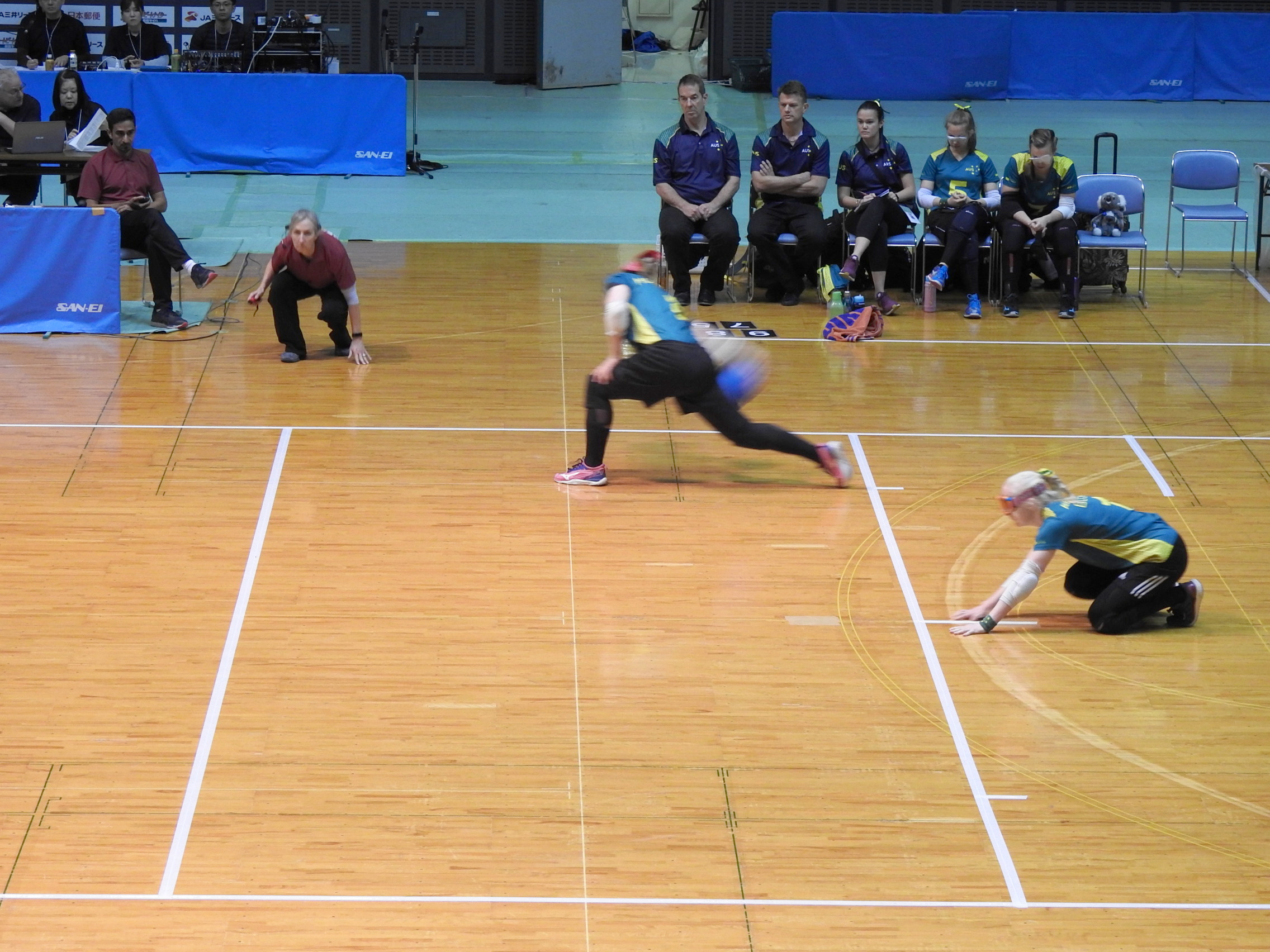
Australia throwing to Thailand. Regional championships, Chiba, Japan (2019).

The team competed in IBSA Oceania goalball region, and from January 2010 became part of the IBSA Asia-Pacific goalball competition region.

=== 2011 Sydney ===
The team competed in a composite tournament, the 2011 IBSA African-Oceania Regional Championships, with games from 15 to 17 November 2011, at the Sydney Olympic Park Sports Centre, Sydney, Australia. Although the four regions under the rules were Africa, America, Asia/Pacific, and Europe, as there were insufficient competitive teams in both Africa and Oceania regions, IBSA agreed to combined championships. For the women's teams, it was only Australia versus New Zealand, the winner qualifying for the London 2012 Paralympic Games. From the best of three games, Australia dominated and qualified.

=== 2013 Beijing ===
The team competed in the 2013 IBSA Asia Pacific Goalball Regional Championships, from 11 to 16 November 2013, in Beijing, China. Of the four women's teams (Australia, China, Iran, Japan), Australia won one game, drew two, and lost three, to finish in fourth position.

=== 2015 Hangzhou ===
The team competed in the 2015 IBSA Asia Pacific Goalball Regional Championships, from 8 to 12 November 2015, in the China National Goalball Training Centre, Hangzhou, China. Of the five women's teams (Australia, China, Japan, Mongolia, Thailand), the team took the bronze medal.

=== 2017 Bangkok ===
The team competed in the 2017 IBSA Asia/Pacific Goalball Regional Championships, from Monday 21 to Saturday 26 August 2017, in the Thai-Japan Sports Stadium, Din Daeng, Bangkok, Thailand. The team lost the bronze medal match to South Korea, 2:10.

=== 2019 Chiba ===
The team competed in the 2019 IBSA Goalball Asia-Pacific Regional Championships, from Thursday 5 to Tuesday 10 December 2019, in the Chiba Port Arena, Chiba, Japan. They placed fourth overall.

=== 2022 Bahrain ===
Due to the COVID-19 pandemic, the 2021 IBSA Goalball Asia-Pacific Regional Championships were moved from November 2021 to 21 March 2022 in Asan, South Korea. The championships was finally held at the Bahrain Sports Federation for Disabilities Sports Centre, in Riffa, Bahrain from Monday 25 July 2022 to Friday 29 July 2022. The top two teams of each division are eligible for the World Championships in December 2022.

There were four women's teams: Australia, Iran, South Korea, Thailand. They placed third in the round-robin, and second overall. The team beat Iran in the semi-finals 7:1, but were beaten by South Korea in the finals 7:2.

== Competitive history ==
The table below contains some individual game results for the team in international matches and competitions.

Year	Event	Opponent	Date	Venue	Team	Team	Winner	Ref
2007	IBSA World Championships and Games	Ukraine	31 July	Brazil	1	4	Australia	
2007	IBSA World Championships and Games	Brazil	1 August	Brazil	8	0	Brazil	
2007	IBSA World Championships and Games	Spain	2 August	Brazil	5	1	Spain	
2007	IBSA World Championships and Games	Japan	3 August	Brazil	4	1	Japan	
2007	IBSA World Championships and Games	South Korea	4 August	Brazil	9	3	Australia	

=== Goal scoring by competition ===
Player	Goals	Competition	Notes	Ref
Ness Murby	7	2007 IBSA World Championships and Games		
Meica Christensen	4	2007 IBSA World Championships and Games		
Erin Conyard	1	2007 IBSA World Championships and Games		

== Gallery ==
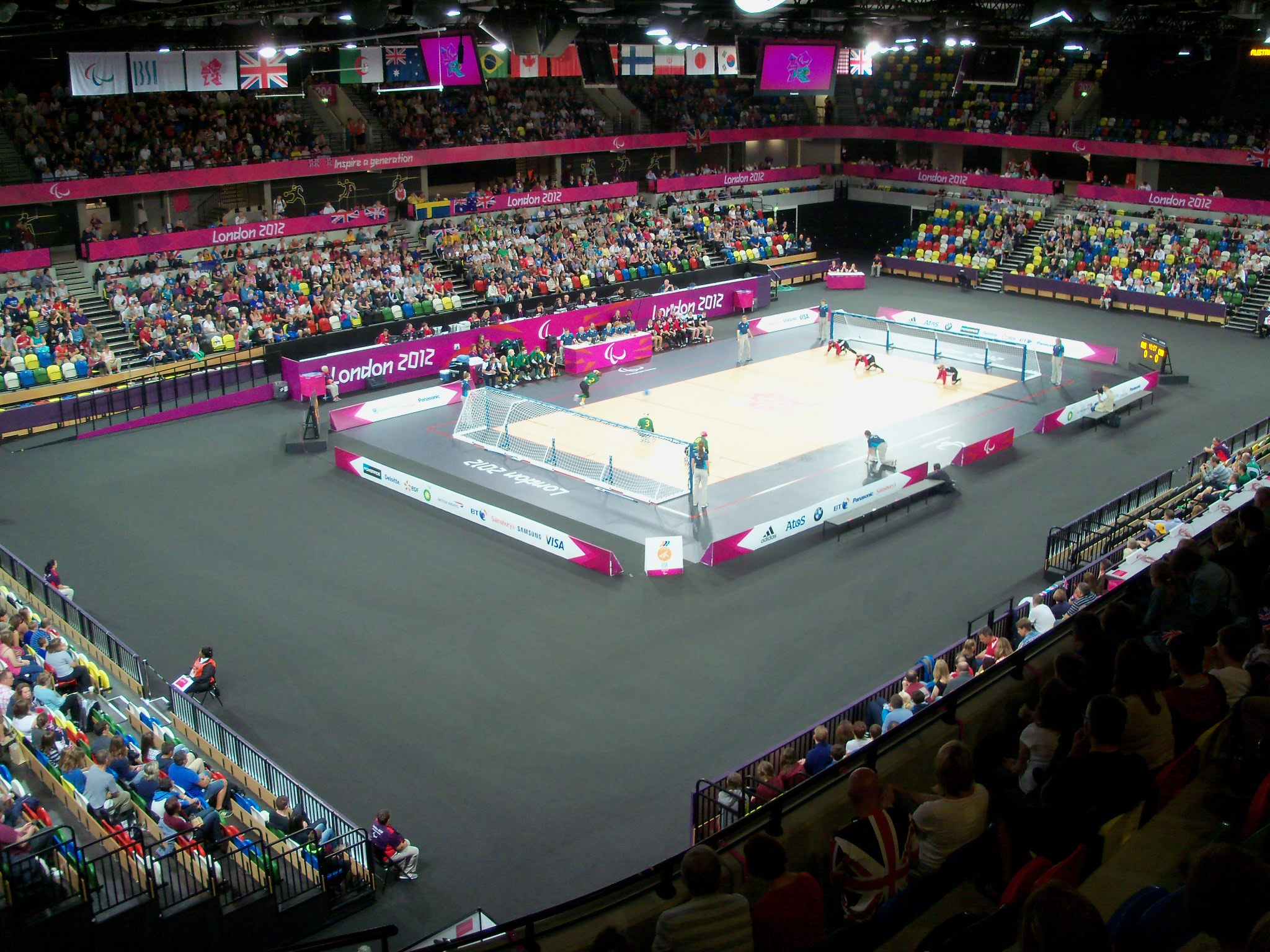
Australia goalball women throwing to Canada women, Copper Box, London 2012 Paralympic Games (Sep 2012).

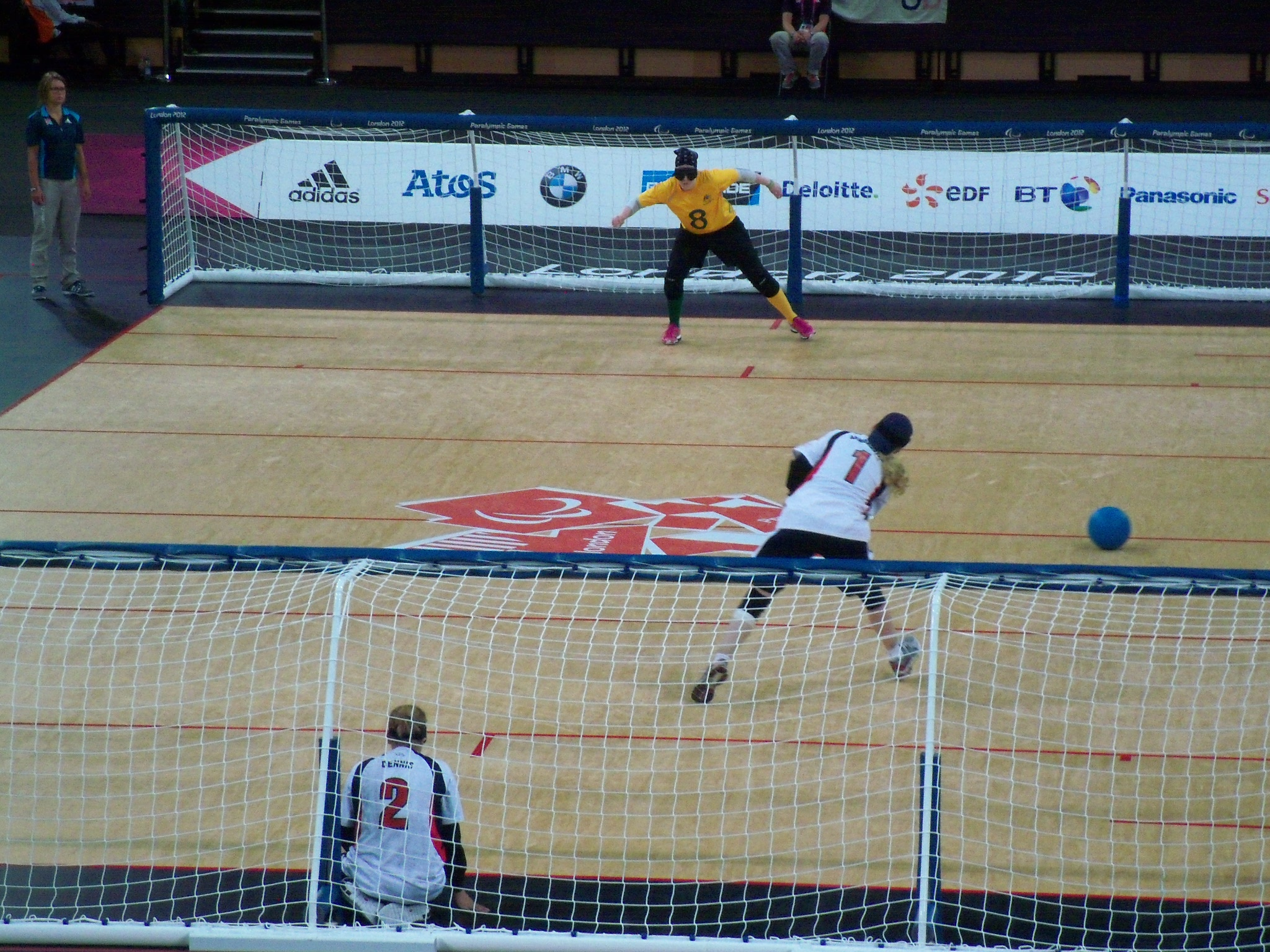
USA women throwing to Australian women, Copper Box, London 2012 Paralympic Games (Sep 2012).

== See also ==
- Australia men's national goalball team
- Australia at the Paralympics
- Parasports

== Bibliography ==
- Australian Paralympic Committee (September 1999). "Goalball – Women". Annual Report – 1999. Sydney, Australia: Australian Paralympic Committee.
- Australian Paralympic Federation (1996). "Golden days of Atlanta : Xth Paralympic Games Atlanta, Georgia, August 15–25, 1996". Sydney. OCLC 222120061.
- Wake, Rebekka (September 2010). "Goalball Comeback". Australian Paralympian. 2. Australia: Australian Paralympic Committee.
