= Goalball at the 2020 Summer Paralympics – Men's team rosters =

This article shows the rosters of all participating teams at the men's goalball tournament at the 2020 Summer Paralympics in Tokyo.

== Group A ==
=== Algeria ===
The following is the Algeria roster in the men's goalball tournament of the 2020 Summer Paralympics.

No.	Player	Class	Date of birth (age)
1	Samir Belhouchat	B2	20 October 1974 (aged 46)
2	Firas Bentria	B1	5 October 1986 (aged 34)
3	Imad Eddine Godmane	B1	23 March 1991 (aged 30)
4	Omar Mebarki	B2	5 February 1994 (aged 27)
5	Djalal Boutadjine	B3	18 December 1994 (aged 26)
7	Abdelhalim Larbi	B1	26 May 1984 (aged 37)

=== Brazil ===
The following is the Brazil roster in the men's goalball tournament of the 2020 Summer Paralympics.

No.	Player	Class	Date of birth (age)
1	José Roberto Oliveira	B1	2 April 1981 (aged 40)
2	Alex de Melo	B2	10 December 1994 (aged 26)
4	Leomon Moreno	B1	21 August 1993 (aged 28)
5	Josemárcio Sousa	B3	8 September 1995 (aged 25)
6	Romário Marques	B1	20 July 1989 (aged 32)
9	Emerson da Silva	B3	11 February 1999 (aged 22)

=== Japan ===
The following is the Japan roster in the men's goalball tournament of the 2020 Summer Paralympics.

No.	Player	Class	Date of birth (age)
1	Yuto Sano	B3	20 June 2002 (aged 19)
4	Yuji Taguchi	B2	16 February 1991 (aged 30)
5	Ryoga Yamaguchi	B1	5 January 1997 (aged 24)
7	Kazuya Kaneko	B3	8 February 2002 (aged 19)
8	Koji Miyajiki	B3	20 March 1995 (aged 26)
9	Yuta Kawashima	B2	24 September 1994 (aged 26)

=== Lithuania ===
The following is the Lithuania roster in the men's goalball tournament of the 2020 Summer Paralympics.

No.	Player	Class	Date of birth (age)
1	Nerijus Montvydas	B1	21 January 1985 (aged 36)
2	Artūras Jonikaitis	B3	21 December 1986 (aged 34)
3	Justas Pažarauskas	B1	15 December 1991 (aged 29)
5	Mantas Brazauskis	B2	15 June 1990 (aged 31)
7	Genrik Pavliukianec	B1	17 June 1976 (aged 45)
9	Marius Zibolis	B1	14 October 1974 (aged 46)

=== United States ===
The following is the United States roster in the men's goalball tournament of the 2020 Summer Paralympics.

No.	Player	Class	Date of birth (age)
1	Daryl Walker	B2	December 29, 1981 (aged 39)
2	Tyler Merren	B2	May 29, 1984 (aged 37)
4	John Kusku	B2	August 6, 1984 (aged 37)
7	Matt Simpson	B1	March 30, 1990 (aged 31)
5	Zachary Buhler	B2	January 5, 1997 (aged 24)
6	Calahan Young	B2	February 23, 1995 (aged 26)

== Group B ==
=== Belgium ===
The following is the Belgium roster in the men's goalball tournament of the 2020 Summer Paralympics.

No.	Player	Class	Date of birth (age)
1	Arne Vanhove	B2	17 August 1983 (aged 38)
2	Wassime Amnir	B1	1 February 1991 (aged 30)
3	Bruno Vanhove	B3	17 August 1983 (aged 38)
5	Klison Mapreni	B2	9 October 1992 (aged 28)
6	Tom Vanhove	B2	17 August 1983 (aged 38)
8	Rob Eijssen	B1	11 January 1991 (aged 30)

=== China ===
The following is the China roster in the men's goalball tournament of the 2020 Summer Paralympics.

No.	Player	Class	Date of birth (age)
1	Lai Liangyu	B1	9 October 2000 (aged 20)
2	Cai Changgui	B1	15 April 1983 (aged 38)
3	Yang Mingyuan	B2	13 January 1998 (aged 23)
4	Chen Liangliang	B1	28 September 1984 (aged 36)
5	Hu Mingyao	B2	14 January 1995 (aged 26)
6	Yu Qinquan	B1	19 April 1996 (aged 25)

=== Germany ===
The following is the Germany roster in the men's goalball tournament of the 2020 Summer Paralympics.

No.	Player	Class	Date of birth (age)
1	Michael Dennis	B2	13 October 1992 (aged 28)
2	Felix Rogge	B3	17 January 1989 (aged 32)
3	Thomas Steiger	B2	31 July 1996 (aged 25)
6	Oliver Hörauf	B2	13 November 1996 (aged 24)
7	Reno Tiede	B2	16 March 1990 (aged 31)
9	Fabian Diehm	B3	6 October 1997 (aged 23)

=== Turkey ===
The following is the Turkey roster in the men's goalball tournament of the 2020 Summer Paralympics.

No.	Player	Class	Date of birth (age)
1	Hüseyin Alkan	B1	1 April 1988 (aged 33)
3	Ebubekir Sıddık Kara	B2	13 July 1995 (aged 26)
4	Ekrem Gündoğdu	B1	26 October 1990 (aged 30)
6	Tekin Okan Düzgün	B1	24 May 1988 (aged 33)
7	Tuncay Karakaya	B1	1 October 1989 (aged 31)
8	Abdullah Aydoğdu	B3	27 September 1991 (aged 29)

=== Ukraine ===
The following is the Ukraine roster in the men's goalball tournament of the 2020 Summer Paralympics.

No.	Player	Class	Date of birth (age)
1	Vasyl Oliinyk	B2	10 January 1996 (aged 25)
2	Anton Strelchyk	B3	4 March 1992 (aged 29)
3	Vitalii Haponenko	B2	17 December 1994 (aged 26)
4	Yevheniy Tsyhanenko	B3	10 December 1990 (aged 30)
5	Rodion Zhyhalin	B2	21 May 1985 (aged 36)
7	Oleksandr Toporkov	B2	31 May 1991 (aged 30)

== See also ==
- Goalball at the 2020 Summer Paralympics – Women's team rosters
