= Raissa Martin =

Australian goalball player (born 1991)

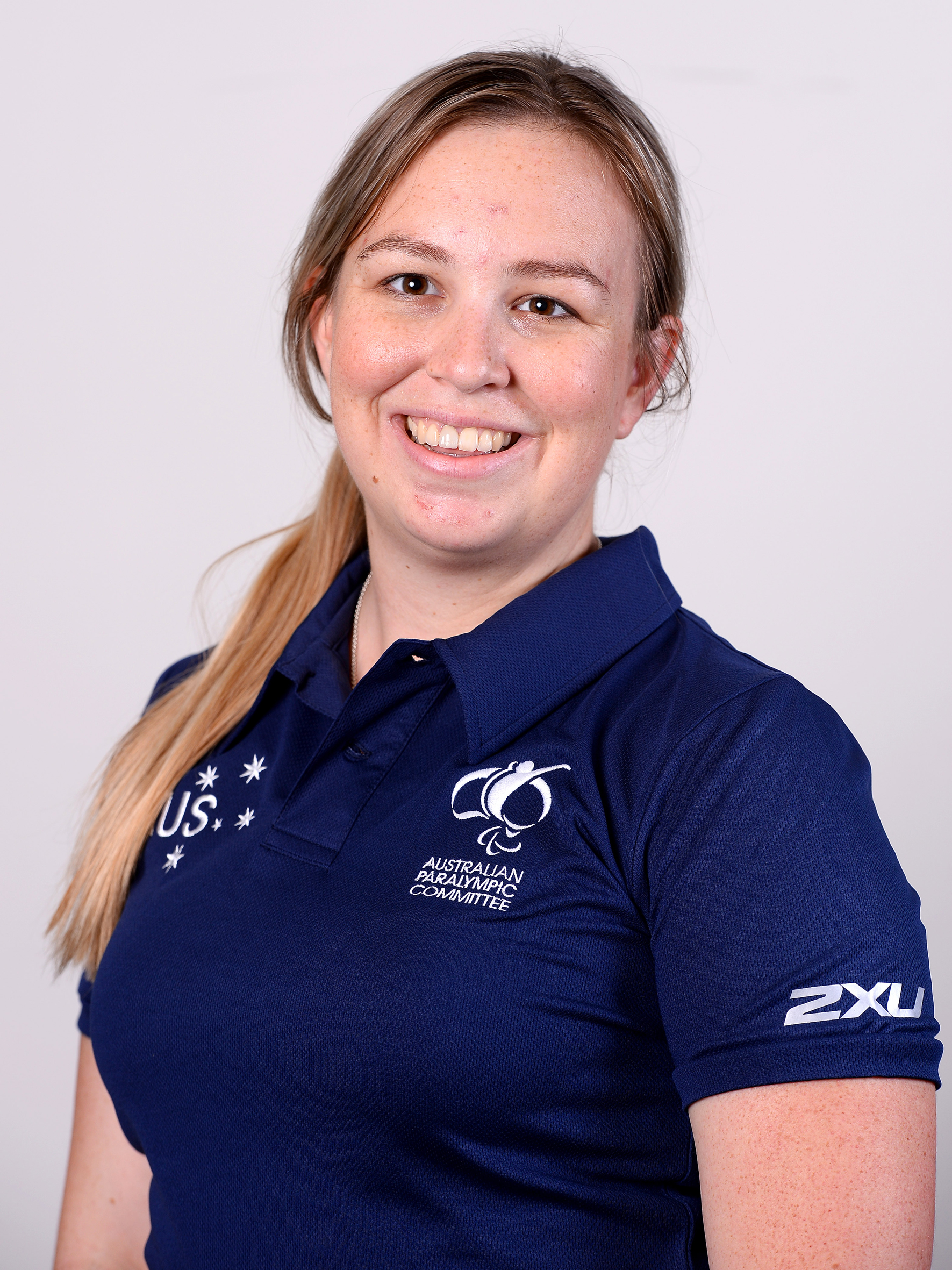
- Martin in 2016

Personal information
- Nationality: Australian
- Born: 3 March 1991 (age 35)

Sport
- Country: Australia
- Sport: Goalball
- Disability class: B3
- Event: Women's team

Raissa Martin (born 3 March 1991) is an Australian goalball player who represented Australia at the 2016 Rio Paralympics and the 2020 Summer Paralympics.

== Personal life ==
Martin was born on 3 March 1991 in Hervey Bay, Queensland. She has been legally blind since birth with rod monochromatism. She grew up in Hervey Bay but moved to Brisbane to attend Queensland Institute of Technology where she completed a Bachelor of Business. In 2015, she undertook a Graduate Diploma of Education at the University of Queensland. in 2021, Raissa works as Middle School Officer - Vision Impairment, Ambrose Treacy College.

== Goalball ==
Martin made her debut for Australia at the 2014 Japan Goalball Championships as part of the development squad. She is classified as a B3 competitor. In May 2015, she was a member of the Australian Women's Goalball team which came fourth at the IBSA World Games in Seoul. She was a member of the Australian team that finished third at the 2015 IBSA Goalball Asia/Pacific Qualifying Tournament in Hangzhou, China. The Belles therefore failed to qualify for the 2016 Paralympics. They were displaced to allow for an African team, Algeria as it turned out, to compete in goalball for the first time. But following the re-allocation of Russia's spot, the Belles found themselves getting a last minute invite to Rio. They entered the tournament ranked ninth in the world. They performed better this time, fighting Uzbekistan to a draw, but they needed a win or draw in their final game against Canada to progress to the quarter finals, but lost 6–0, ending their second Paralympic campaign.

At the 2020 Summer Paralympics, Martin and the other members of the Belles team comprising Meica Horsburgh, Jennifer Blow, Amy Ridley, Brodie Smith, and Tyan Taylor won two group stage games out of four and qualified for the quarterfinals. The team lost to Turkey 10-6 and failed to win a medal.

== See also ==
- Australia women's national goalball team
