= Michelle Rzepecki =

Australian goalball player

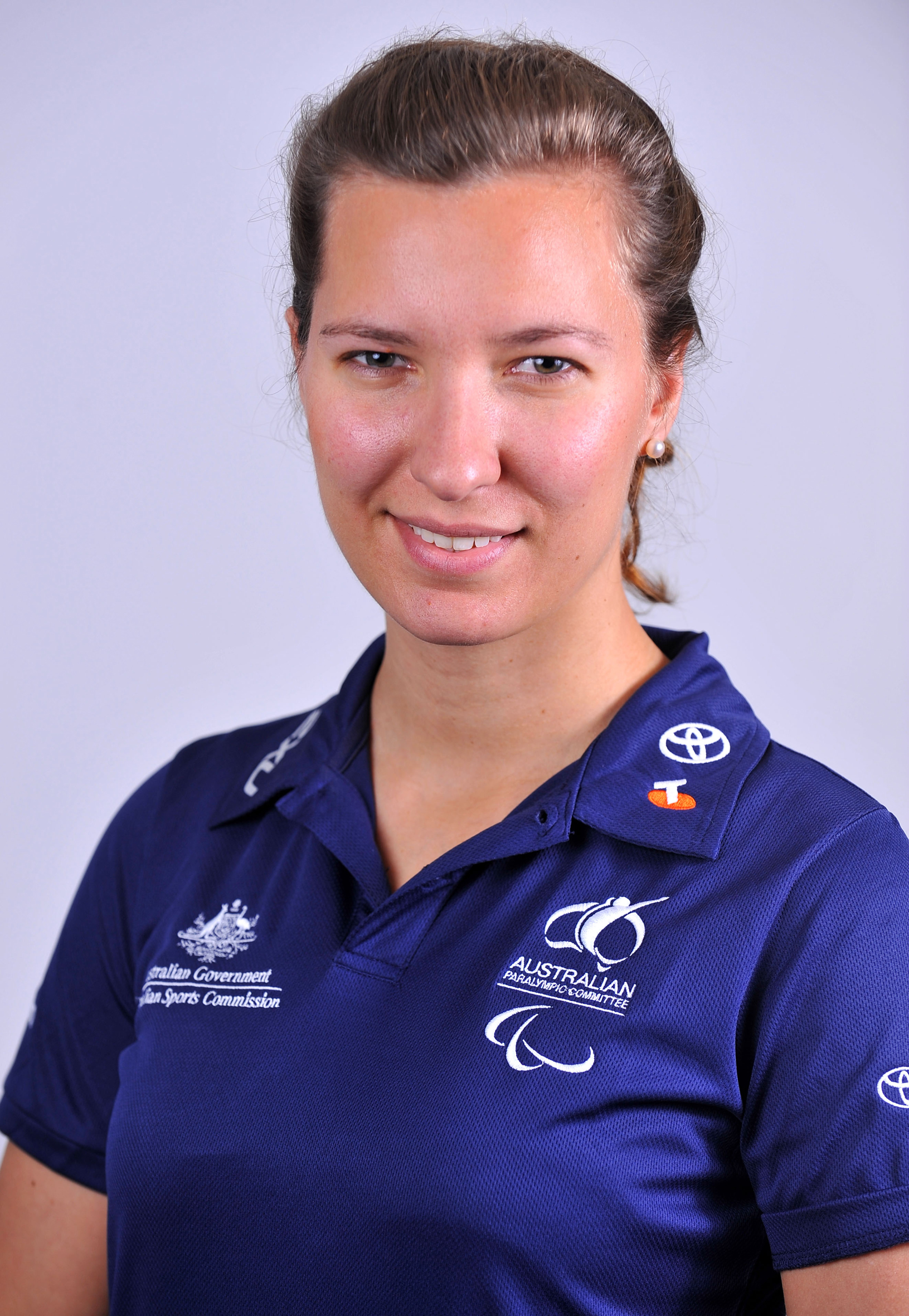
- 2012 Australian Paralympic team portrait of Rzepecki

Personal information
- Nationality: Australian
- Born: 6 November 1986 (age 40) Wollstonecraft, New South Wales
- Height: 173 cm (68 in) (2012)

Sport
- Country: Australia
- Sport: Goalball

Michelle Rzepecki (born 6 November 1986) is an Australian goalball player classified as a B3 competitor. She made her debut for the Australia women's national goalball team at the 2011 African-Oceania regional Paralympic qualifying competition. She was selected to represent Australia at the 2016 Summer Paralympics in goalball.

== Personal life ==
Rzepecki was born on 6 November 1986 in Wollstonecraft, New South Wales, and is 173 centimetres (68 in) tall. She has the visual disability rod monochromatism, which she acquired at birth. She can play the saxophone and piano. Rzepecki is a third-generation Australian, as her grandfather moved to Australia from Germany. While attending Castle Hill High School, she returned to the country of her grandfather's birth to do study abroad that was funded by a scholarship from the Society for Australian-German Student Exchange Inc. She also lived in Bolivia for a while, working at a school for children with visual impairments. While there, she introduced the children to goalball. Part of her work in the country was funded by a mini-grant. As of 2012, she works as a Sydney Tower Skywalk guide.

== Goalball ==
Rzepecki is a goalball player, and for visual disability sports, is classified as a B3 competitor. She is a centre and winger. She has a goalball scholarship with the New South Wales Institute of Sport. Rzepecki started playing the sport in 2002. She competed at the 2004 Australian National Goalball Championships, playing for the New South Wales goalball team which beat the Queensland goalball team in the finals. In 2011, Rzepecki made her national team debut during the African-Oceania regional Paralympic qualifying competition. She played in the game against the New Zealand women's national goalball team that Australia won. As a member of the 2011 team, she finished sixth at the IBSA Goalball World Cup.

The Australian Paralympic Committee had chosen to work on her development as a goalball player with the idea that she might be able to qualify for, and win a medal at, the 2016 Summer Paralympics. She was a named a member of the Aussie Belles that was going to the 2012 Summer Paralympics, in what would be her debut Games. That the team qualified for the Games came as a surprise, as the Australian Paralympic Committee had been working on player development with an idea of the team qualifying for the 2016 Summer Paralympics. An Australian team had not participated since the 2000 Summer Paralympics, when they earned an automatic selection as hosts, and the team finished last in the competition. Going into the Paralympics, her team was ranked eighth in the world. In the 2012 Summer Paralympics tournament, the Belles played games against Japan, Canada, the United States and Sweden. They lost every game, and did not advance to the finals.

The Belles originally failed to qualify for the 2016 Paralympics after finishing third at the IBSA Goalball Asia Pacific Championships in Hangzhou, China. They were displaced to allow for an African team, Algeria as it turned out, to compete in goalball for the first time. But following the re-allocation of Russia's spot, the Belles found themselves getting a last minute invite to Rio.They entered the tournament ranked ninth in the world. They performed better this time, fighting Uzbekistan to a draw, but they needed a win or draw in their final game against Canada to progress to the quarter finals, but lost 6–0, ending their second Paralympic campaign.
