= Multifocal choroiditis and panuveitis =

Inflammatory disorder

- Specialty: Ophthalmology

Multifocal choroiditis and panuveitis (MCP) is an inflammatory disorder of unknown etiology, affecting the choroid, retina, and vitreous of the eye that presents asymmetrically, most often in young myopic women with photopsias, enlargement of the physiologic blind spot and decreased vision.

The first description of the disease was written in 1973.

== Symptoms and signs ==
Symptoms include blurry vision, with or without sensitivity to light, blind spots, floaters, eye discomfort and perceived flashes of light.

== Diagnosis ==
An ophthalmologist may use a series of imaging techniques. A test called flourescein angiography uses a special dye and camera to study blood flow in the back layers of the eye. When a person has multifocal choroiditis (MFC), lesions in the eye will appear as fluorescent spots. Visual field tests may also show an enlarged blind spot or a decrease in visual clarity. Often, doctors may order blood tests to check if the symptoms are caused by a viral disease rather than MFC.

== Treatment ==
Treatments vary depending on the severity of the diagnosis. A steroid regimen taken orally, often at low doses, is recommended as a first course of treatment. The low dose of steroids can help decrease inflammation, and as a result, lessens the visual impairment. In the event steroids are not effective, medicines may be administered via injections directly into the eye. One such treatment uses Ozurdex. A small capsule is inserted into the eye via injection, and releases medicines slowly, in the course of a few months, as the capsule dissolves.
