= Brodie Smith (goalball player) =

Australian national athlete, for the Paralympic sport of goalball

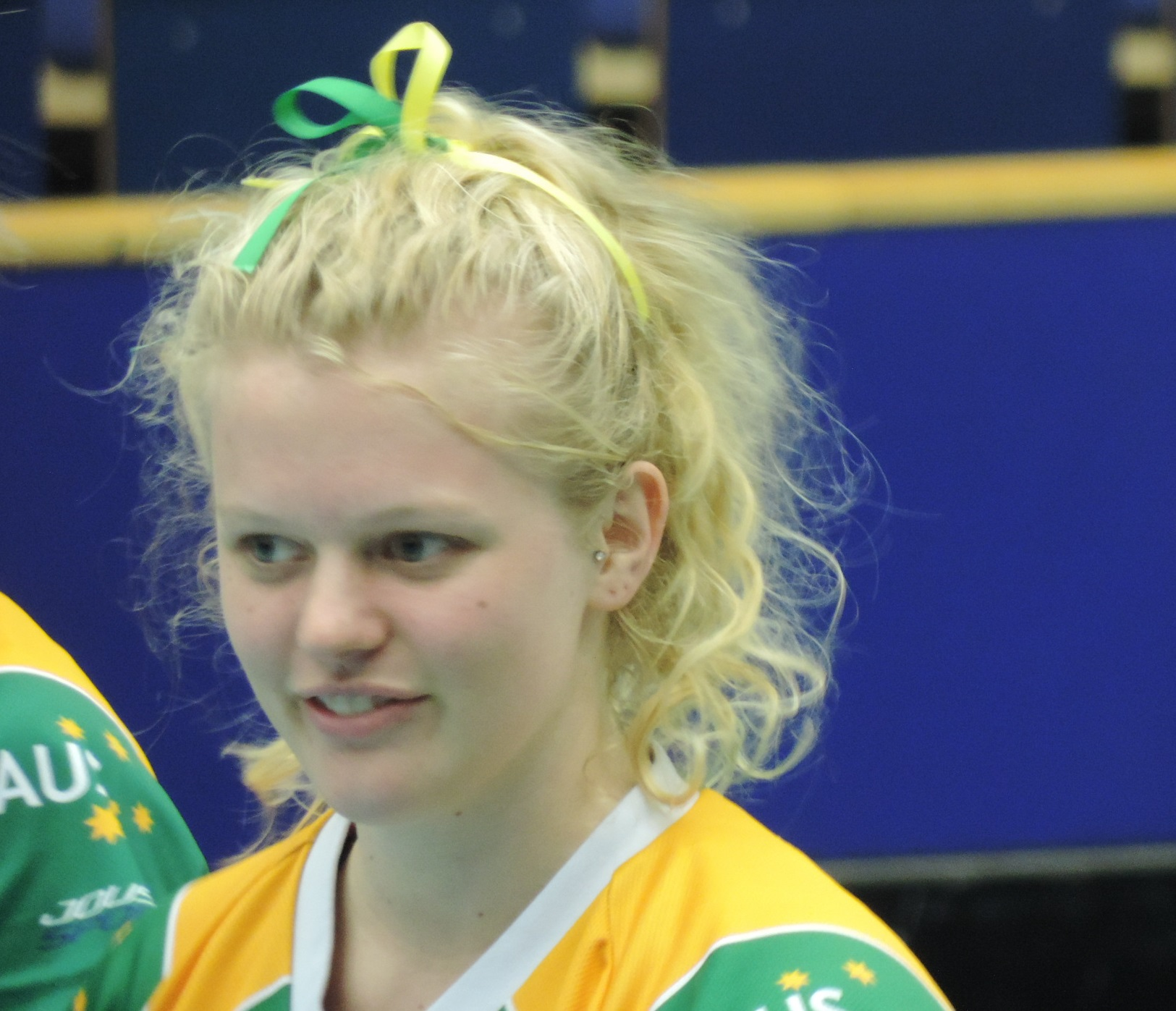
- Smith at Goalball World Championships, Malmö, Sweden (June 2018).

Personal information
- Nationality: Australian
- Born: Brodie Smith; 8 August 1998 (age 27)
- Spouse: Jake Benson (m. 2022)

Sport
- Country: Australia
- Sport: Goalball

Brodie Smith (born 8 August 1998) is an Australian goalball athlete and is classified as a B3 competitor. She represented Australia at the 2020 Summer Paralympics.

== Personal life ==
Smith was born on 8 August 1998. She has retinitis pigmentosa, a genetic condition that causes a loss of peripheral vision. She attended Maitland's Christian School. In 2021, she was studying secondary education at the University of Newcastle.

== Goalball ==
Smith is a goalball player. At the 2017 World Youth Championships in Hungary she was the highest scorer in the tournament and captained the Australian team to a historic gold medal. The following year, Smith was included in the Belles' squad for the 2018 World Championships in Sweden.

At the 2020 Summer Paralympics, Smith and the other members of the Belles team comprising Meica Horsburgh, Jennifer Blow, Amy Ridley, Raisa Martin, and Tyan Taylor won two group stage games out of four and qualified for the quarterfinals. The team lost to Turkey 10-6 and failed to win a medal. Smith scored in the group stage and in the quarterfinal. Her father Simon was the assistant women's coach.

== See also ==
- Australia women's national goalball team
