= Nicole Esdaile =

Australian female goalball Paralympian (born 1987)

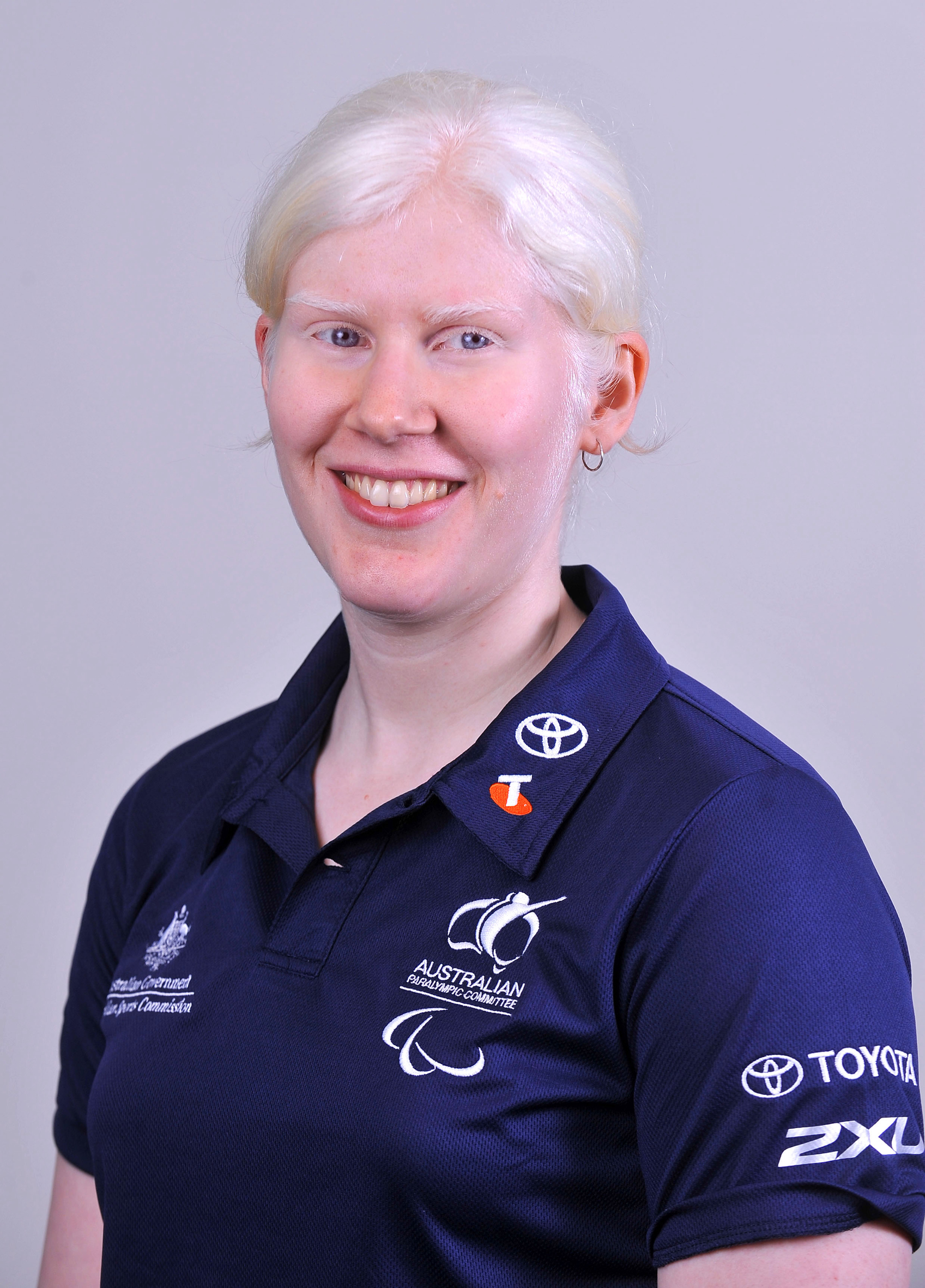
- 2012 Australian Paralympic team portrait of Esdaile

Personal information
- Nationality: Australian
- Born: 1 June 1987 (age 39) The Gap, Queensland

Sport
- Country: Australia
- Sport: Goalball

Nicole Esdaile (born 1 June 1987) is an Australian goalball player and is classified as a B2 competitor. She took up the sport in 1999, and made her national team debut in 2010. Subsequently, she has competed at the 2010 Goalball World Championships, 2011 IBSA Africa Oceania Goalball Regional Champions and 2011 IBSA Goalball World Cup. She was selected to represent Australia at the 2016 Summer Paralympics in goalball .

== Personal life ==
Esdaile was born on 1 June 1987, and has a visual disability called oculocutaneous albinism.

== Goalball ==
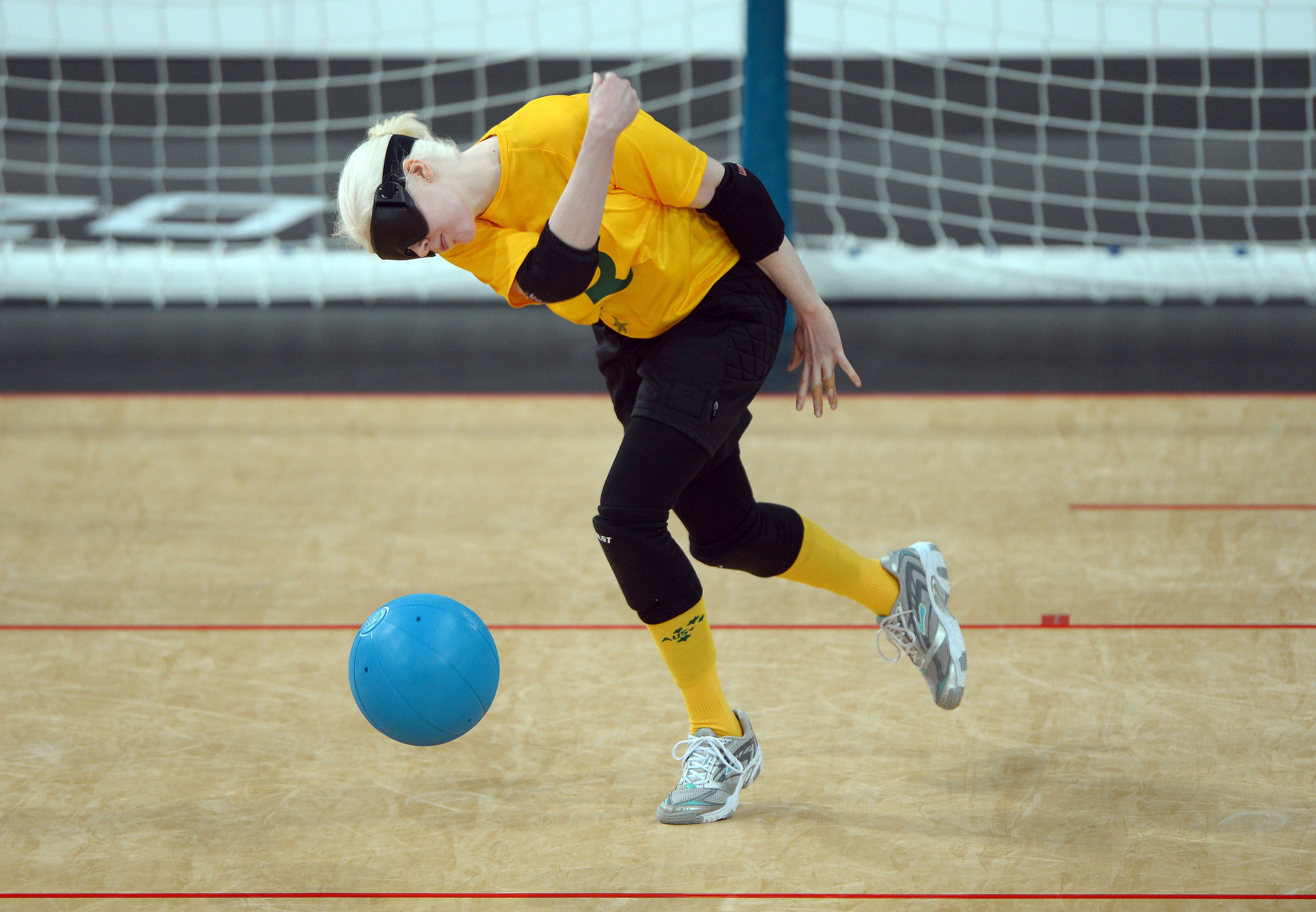
Esdaile at the 2012 London Paralympics

Esdaile is a goalball player, and is classified as a B2 competitor. Her introduction to the sport was in primary school in 1999. She has continuously played it since then.

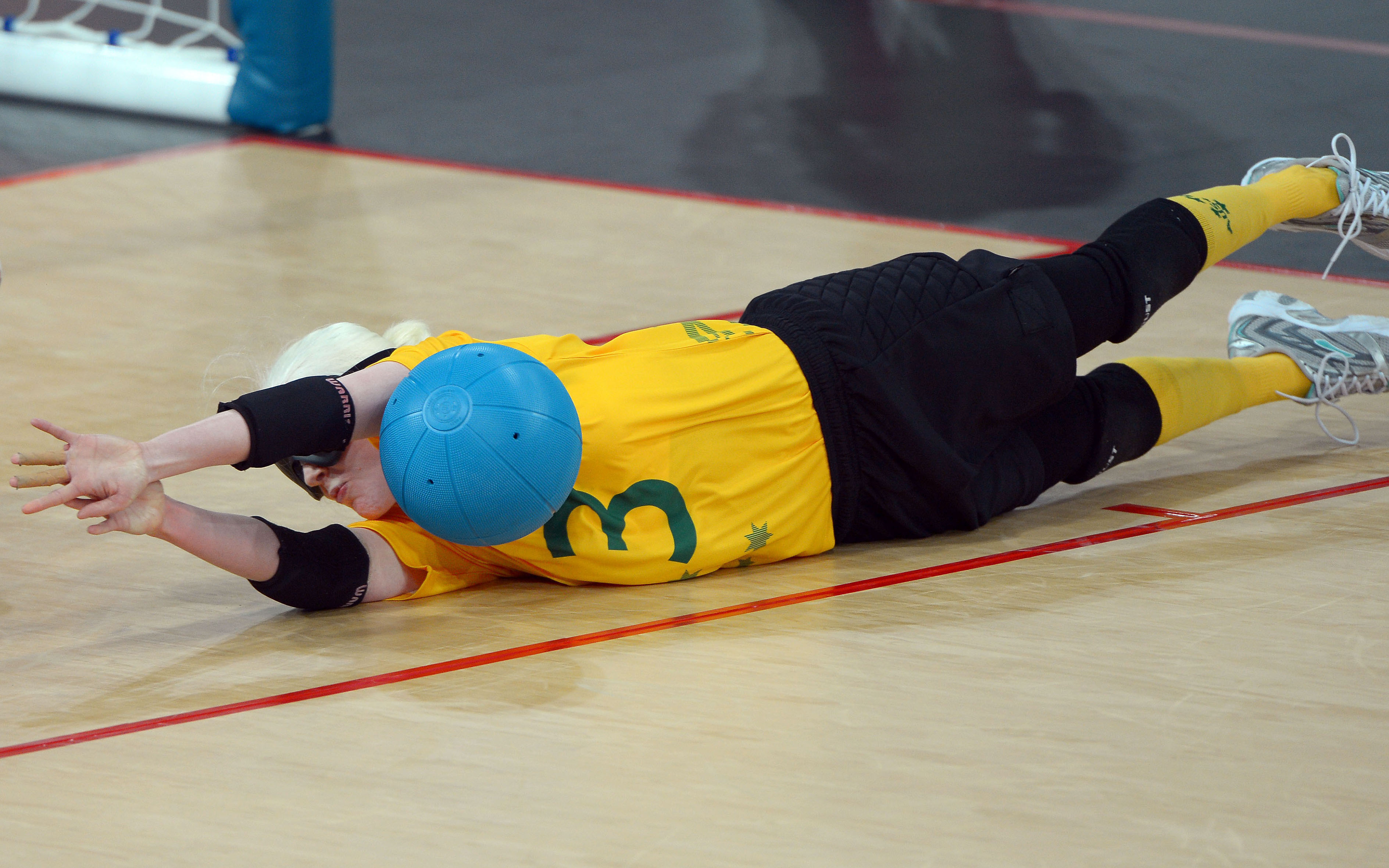
Esdaile at the 2012 London Paralympics

Esdaile made her national team debut in 2010 at the Goalball World Championships. In a game against Greece, she scored a goal immediately following a penalty. As a member of the 2011 team, she finished sixth at the IBSA Goalball World Cup. Her team made it the quarter finals before losing to Russia 3–6. Her team then met the Spain women's national goalball team to try to earn a spot in the fifth/sixth place match. Australia walked away 8-7 victors, but lost the fifth/sixth place match to the Israel women's national goalball team 6–8.

She was with the team during the 2011 IBSA Africa Oceania Goalball Regional Champions, which served as the Paralympic qualifying tournament. In her first game against New Zealand, her team won 11-4 after leading 7–1 at the half. She scored three goals in the team's victory. She also played in a match against Germany, and in the final match against New Zealand women's national goalball team, which Australia won, with Esdaile scoring a pair of goals.

Esdaile was a named a member of the Aussie Belles that was going to the 2012 Summer Paralympics. That the team qualified for the Games came as a surprise, as the Australian Paralympic Committee head been working on player development with the idea of qualifying for the 2016 Summer Paralympics.

An Australian team had not participated since the 2000 Summer Paralympics, when they earned an automatic selection as hosts, and the team finished last in the competition. The country has not medalled in the event since 1976. Going into the Paralympics, the team was ranked eighth in the world. In the 2012 Summer Paralympics tournament, the Belles played games against Japan, Canada, the United States and Sweden. They lost every game, and did not advance to the finals. Esdaile was the team's lead scorer, with four goals.

The Belles originally failed to qualify for the 2016 Paralympics after finishing third at the IBSA Goalball Asia Pacific Championships in Hangzhou, China. They were displaced to allow for an African team, Algeria as it turned out, to compete in goalball for the first time. But following the re-allocation of Russia's spot, the Belles found themselves getting a last minute invite to Rio.They entered the tournament ranked ninth in the world. They performed better this time, fighting Uzbekistan to a draw, but they needed a win or draw in their final game against Canada to progress to the quarter finals, but lost 6–0, ending their second Paralympic campaign.
