= Andrew Ridley =

Australian cricketer

Personal information
- Full name: Andrew Claude Ridley
- Born: 2 August 1968 (age 58); Sydney, New South Wales, Australia
- Batting: Left-handed
- Bowling: Right-arm medium

Domestic team information
- Years: Team
- 1994–1996: Oxford University

Career statistics
| Competition | First-class | List A |
|---|---|---|
| Matches | 20 | 4 |
| Runs scored | 857 | 152 |
| Batting average | 31.74 | 38.00 |
| 100s/50s | 2/3 | –/1 |
| Top score | 155 | 58 |
| Balls bowled | 30 | 42 |
| Wickets | 0 | 0 |
| Bowling average | – | – |
| 5 wickets in innings | – | – |
| 10 wickets in match | – | – |
| Best bowling | – | – |
| Catches/stumpings | 5/– | 2/– |
- Source: Cricinfo, 1 September 2019

Andrew Claude Ridley (born 2 August 1968) is an Australian former cricketer.

Ridley was born at Sydney in August 1968. He studied at the University of Sydney, before undertaking his post-graduate studies in England at Exeter College, Oxford. While studying at Oxford, he made his debut in first-class cricket for Oxford University against Durham at Oxford in 1994. He played first-class cricket for Oxford until 1996, making twenty appearances. Playing as a batsman, he scored 857 runs at an average of 31.74. He made two centuries, with a high score of 155 against Cambridge University in The University Match of 1996. In addition to playing first-class cricket while at Oxford, he also made four List A one-day appearances for the British Universities cricket team in the 1996 Benson & Hedges Cup, scoring 152 runs at an average of 38.00, with a high score of 58.
