= Rachel Henderson =

Australian female goalball Paralympian (born 1992)

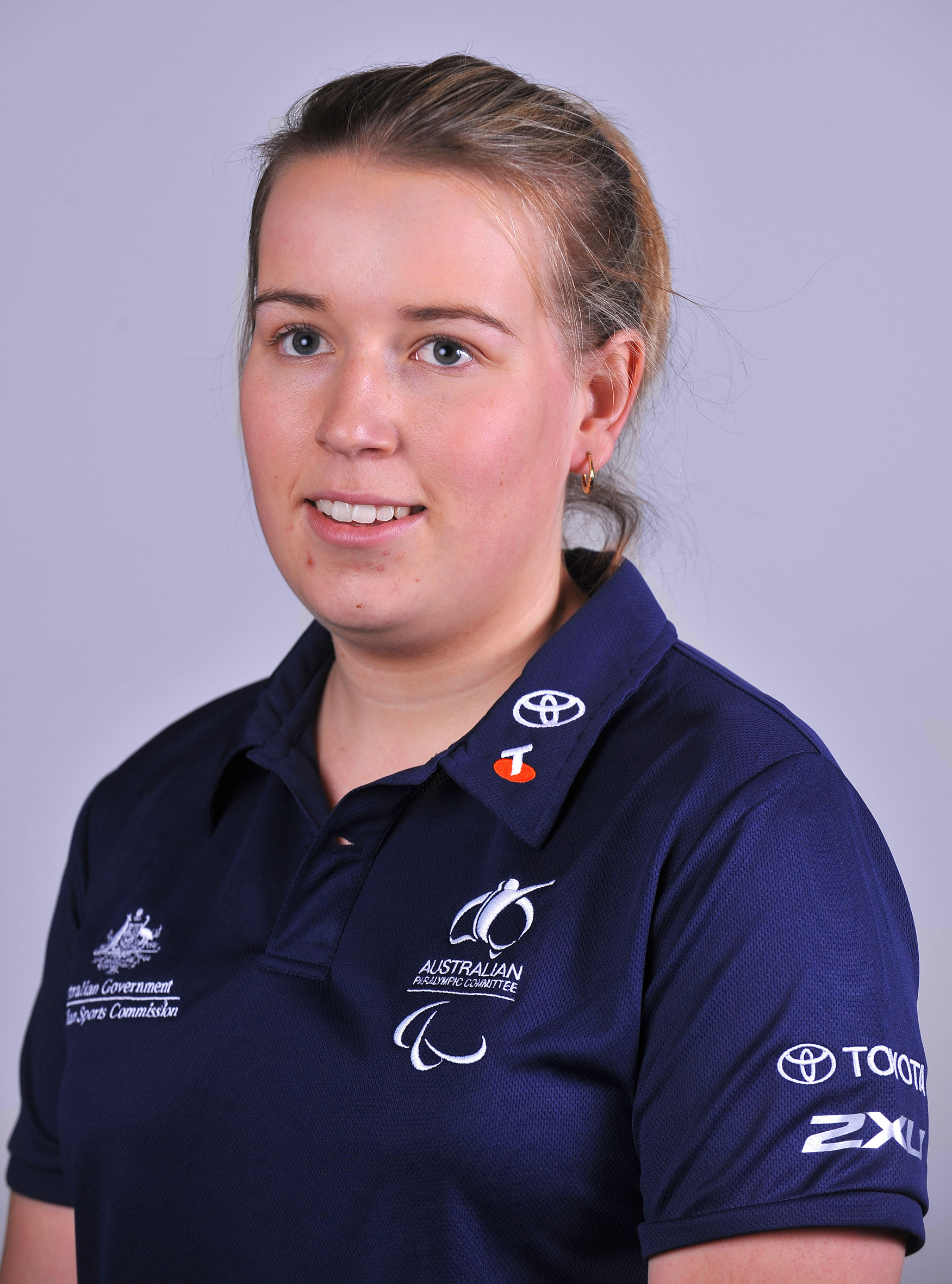
- 2012 Australian Paralympic team portrait of Henderson

Personal information
- Full name: Rachel Anne Henderson
- Nationality: Australian
- Born: 8 September 1992 (age 34) Nuriootpa, South Australia

Sport
- Country: Australia
- Sport: Goalball
- Event: Women's Team

Rachel Anne Henderson (born 8 September 1992) is an Australian goalball player and is classified as a B2 competitor. While only starting playing the game in 2010, she made the national team in 2011 and competed in the 2011 IBSA Goalball World Cup and 2011 African-Oceania regional Paralympic qualifying competition. She was selected to represent Australia at the 2012 Summer Paralympics in goalball.

== Personal life ==
Henderson was born in Nuriootpa, South Australia, on 8 September 1992. She has the visual disability of retinitis pigmentosa, a heredity disease she was diagnosed with when she was four years old. As a child, Henderson was involved in javelin, and only stopped competing in 2010 following taking up goalball. She was also involved in swimming, representing South Australia in a few national competitions, before leaving the sport at the same time she quit athletics. She graduated from Nuriootpa High School in 2010. As of 2012, she is studying with the goal of becoming a preschool teacher.

== Goalball ==
Henderson is a goalball player, and is classified as a B2 competitor. She has a goalball scholarship with the South Australian Institute of Sport. In 2011/2012, the Australian Sports Commission gave her a A$7,000 as part of their DAS grant program. She does not play for a state team. Rather, she is coached by Australian Paralympic Committee (APC) Development Coordinator and athletics coach Cathy Lambert. Having not even heard of goalball a few months before, Henderson took up the sport in 2010 following an invitation to attend a team training camp. She made the national team in January 2011 at the national trials, and her national team debut in 2011 at the IBSA Goalball World Cup, where her team finished sixth, and she scored four total goals. Her team made it the quarter-finals before losing to Russia 3–6. It then met the Spain women's national goalball team to try to earn a spot in the fifth/sixth place match, where Australia walked away 8–7 victors. In the fifth/sixth place match, it lost to the Israel women's national goalball team 6–8. She played in the 2011 African-Oceania regional Paralympic qualifying competition and in its gold medal game against the New Zealand women's national goalball team, which Australia won.

Henderson was a named a member of the Aussie Belles that was going to the 2012 Summer Paralympics. She was the youngest member of the team, and the only South Australian. That the team qualified for the Games came as a surprise, as the Australian Paralympic Committee had been working on player development with the idea of qualifying for the 2016 Summer Paralympics. An Australian team had not participated since the 2000 Summer Paralympics, when they earned an automatic selection as hosts, and the team finished last in the competition. The country has not medalled in the event since 1976. Going into the Paralympics, the team was ranked eighth in the world. In the 2012 Summer Paralympics tournament, the Belles played games against Japan, Canada, the United States and Sweden. They lost every game, and did not advance to the finals.
