= Jennifer Blow =

Australian female goalball player (born 1991)

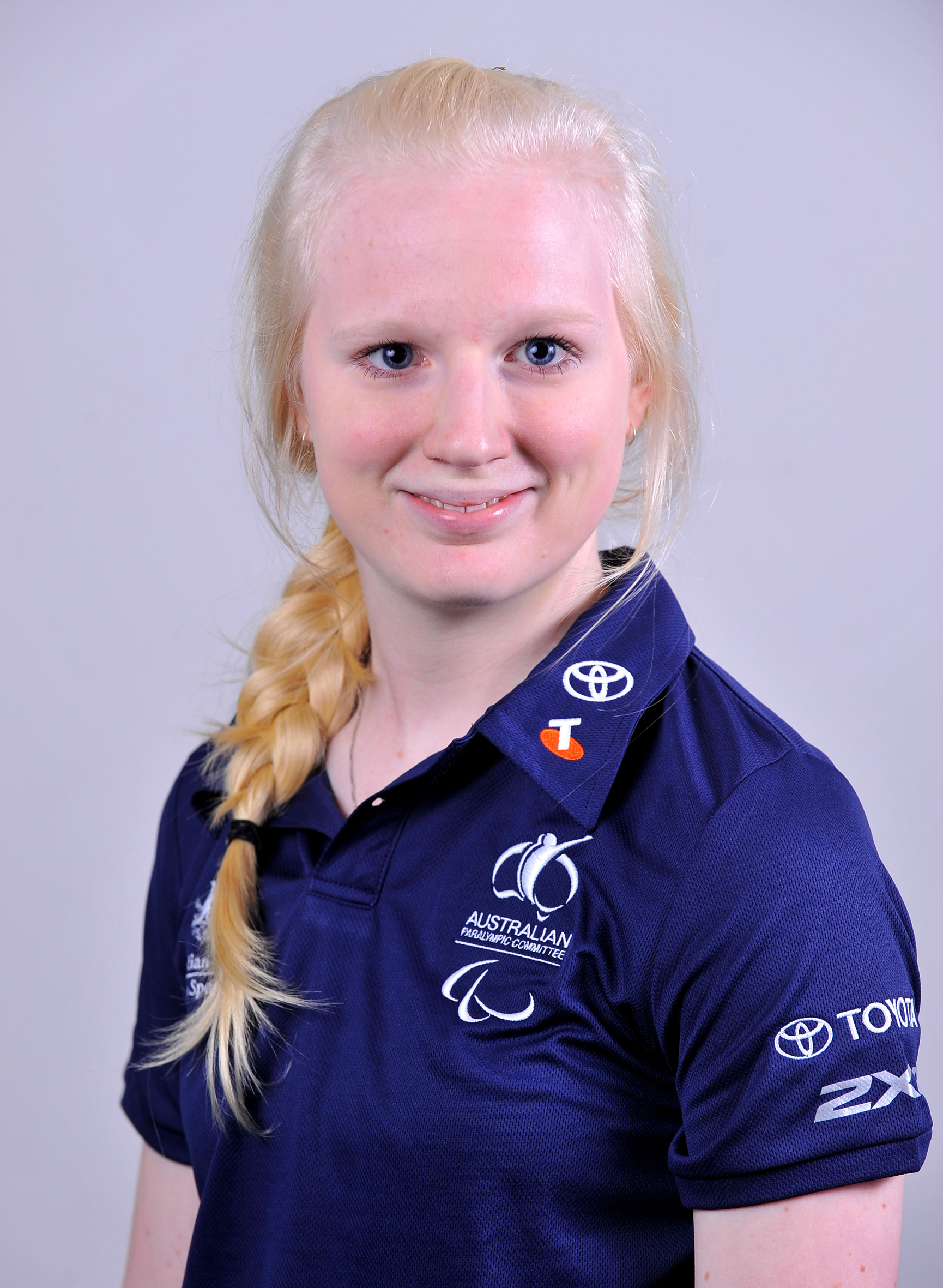
- 2012 Australian Paralympic team portrait of Blow

Personal information
- Nickname: Awesome
- Nationality: Australian
- Born: 10 January 1991 (age 35) Narraweena, New South Wales
- Height: 165 cm (65 in) (2012)

Sport
- Country: Australia
- Sport: Goalball
- Event: Women's team
- Team: New South Wales women's goalball team

Jennifer "Jenny" Blow (born 10 January 1991) is an Australian goalball player and is classified as a B3 competitor. Having only started playing the sport in 2009, she has several goalball scholarships. She plays for the New South Wales women's goalball team in the Australian national championships, where she has won three silver medals. As a member of the national team, she has competed in the 2010 World Championships, 2011 IBSA Goalball World Cup and the 2011 African-Oceania regional Paralympic qualifying competition. She represented Australia at the 2012 Summer Paralympics, 2016 Summer Paralympics and 2020 Summer Paralympics in goalball.

== Personal life ==
Nicknamed 'Awesome' by her goalball teammates, also called 'Jenny', Blow was born in Narraweena, New South Wales, on 10 January 1991. She has two sisters. She has the visual disability of oculocutaneous albinism, a congenital vision impairment, and is 165 centimetres (65 in). As of 2012, Blow is attending the University of Sydney and double majoring in Arts and Education, which would enable her to become an English and drama teacher. In 2009, she was awarded a New South Wales Department of Education and Training Teacher Education Scholarship. In 2011, she earned the NSW Institute of Sport Academic Excellence Award. In 2021, she is Education Manager at Paralympics Australia.

== Goalball ==
Blow is a goalball player, and is classified as a B3 competitor. She started playing the sport in 2009. She has a goalball scholarship with the New South Wales Institute of Sport, and the Sydney University Elite Athlete Program. In 2011/2012, the Australian Sports Commission gave her a A$7,000 grant as part of their Direct Athlete Support (DAS) program. Blow plays for the New South Wales women's goalball team, making her debut in 2009. As a member of the team, she has earned three total silver medals at the national championships, including one in 2010.

Blow made her national team debut in 2010, less than a year after taking up the sport, when she represented Australia at the 2010 World Championships, where her team finished eighth. As a member of the 2011 team, she finished sixth at the IBSA Goalball World Cup. During the tournament, she found "a rock shaped like the lucky egg from the film Cool Runnings. The rock has since become integrated into her team's pre-grame ritual where she "must hold the rock and quote from the movie before every big game." Her team made it the quarter finals before losing to Russia 3–6. It then met the Spain women's national goalball team to try to earn a spot in the fifth/sixth place match. Australia walked away 8-7 victors, but in the fifth/sixth place match, it lost to the Israel women's national goalball team 6–8. She played in the 2011 African-Oceania regional Paralympic qualifying competition. She played in the gold medal game against the New Zealand women's national goalball team. Australia won the game. The Manly Daily described her play in the series as "instrumental" to the team's success.

Blow was a named a member of the Aussie Belles that was going to the 2012 Summer Paralympics. That the team qualified for the Games came as a surprise, as the Australian Paralympic Committee had been working on player development with the idea of qualifying for the 2016 Summer Paralympics. An Australian team had not participated since the 2000 Summer Paralympics, when they earned an automatic selection as hosts, and the team finished last in the competition. The country has not medalled in the event since 1976. Going into the Paralympics, the team was ranked eighth in the world. She was 21 years old at the Games. In the 2012 Paralympic tournament, the Belles played games against Japan, Canada, the United States and Sweden. They lost every game, and did not advance to the finals.

The Belles originally failed to qualify for the 2016 Paralympics after finishing third at the IBSA Goalball Asia Pacific Championships in Hangzhou, China. They were displaced to allow for an African team, Algeria as it turned out, to compete in goalball for the first time. But following the re-allocation of Russia's spot, the Belles found themselves getting a last minute invite to Rio. They entered the tournament ranked ninth in the world. They performed better this time, fighting Uzbekistan to a draw, but they needed a win or draw in their final game against Canada to progress to the quarter finals, but lost 6–0, ending their second Paralympic campaign.

At the 2020 Summer Paralympics, Blow and the other members of the Belles team comprising Meica Horsburgh, Raissa Martin, Amy Ridley, Brodie Smith, and Tyan Taylor won two group stage games out of four and qualified for the quarterfinals. The team lost to Turkey 10-6 and failed to win a medal.

== See also ==
- Australia women's national goalball team
