= Tyan Taylor =

Australian female goalball Paralympian (born 1990)

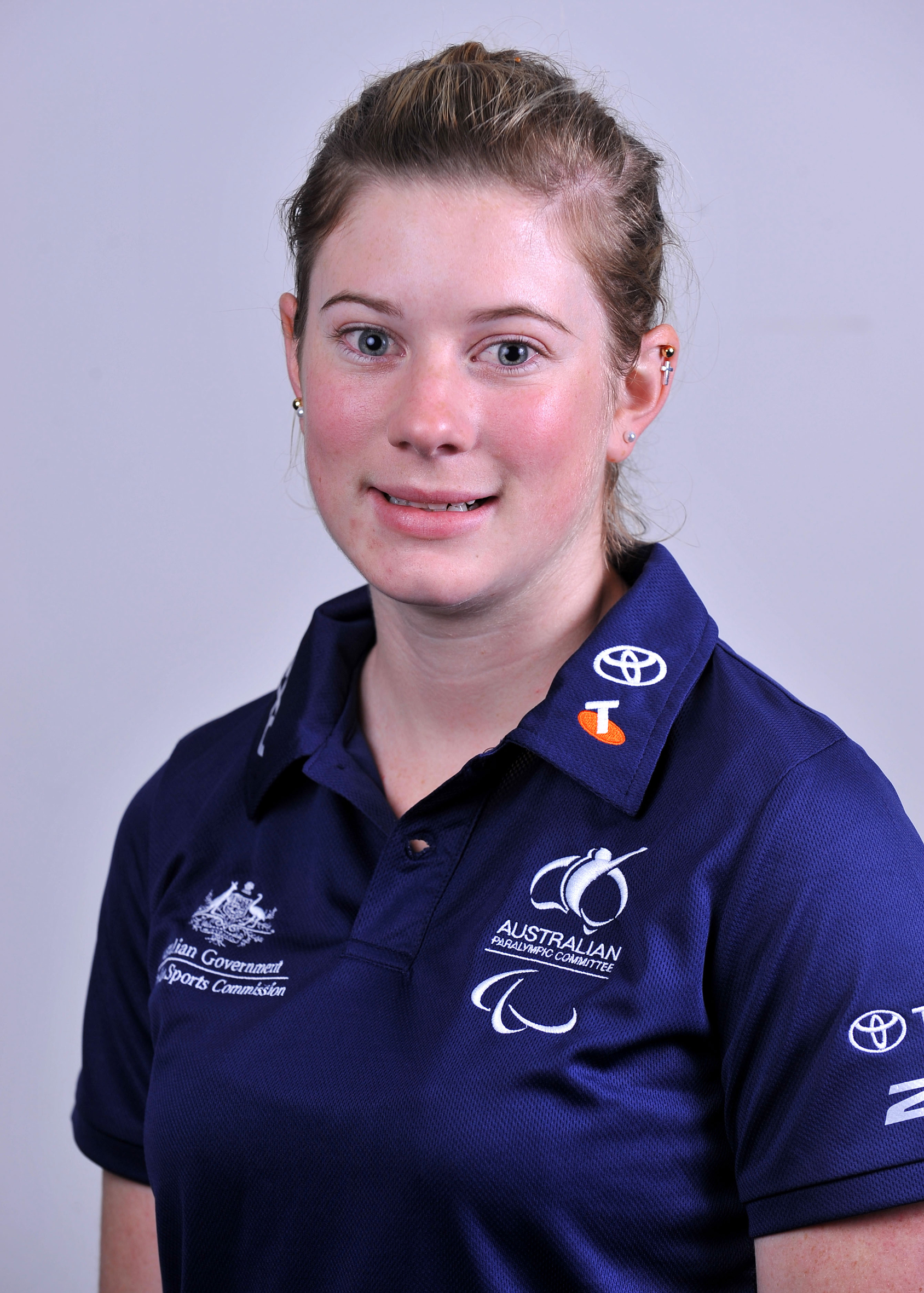
- 2012 Australian Paralympic team portrait of Taylor

Personal information
- Nickname: Little girl
- Nationality: Australian
- Born: 23 March 1990 (age 36)
- Height: 156 cm (61 in) (2012)

Sport
- Country: Australia
- Sport: Goalball

Tyan "Little Girl" Taylor (born 23 March 1990) is an Australian goalball winger and is classified as a B3 competitor. In 2009, after only a month playing the sport, Taylor was named to the New South Wales team. She made the national team in 2011 and has played in the 2010 World Championships, 2011 IBSA Goalball World Cup and 2011 IBSA Africa Oceania Goalball Regional Champions. She represented Australia at the 2016 Summer Paralympics and 2020 Summer Paralympics in goalball.

== Personal life ==
Nicknamed "Little Girl" because of her size, Taylor was born on 23 March 1990 in Mount Kuring-gai, New South Wales. She has ocular albinism and nystagmus, conditions she was born with, and is 156 centimetres (61 in) tall. Taylor has participated in two extreme sports: skydiving and bungee jumping. In 2021, she worked as a classroom assistant at an early intervention centre.

== Goalball ==
Taylor is a goalball player, and is a winger and centre. She is classified as a B3 competitor, and has a goalball scholarship with the New South Wales Institute of Sport.

When Taylor was ten years old, several years before started the sport, her grandmother made a comment to her after having seen the game that Taylor could play and one day make the Paralympics. Only when she got to high school, in August 2009, did she start playing the sport. After only a month playing the sport, Taylor was selected for the New South Wales team that competed at the 2009 National Championships, where she was the second leading scorer in what was her first major competition. Playing again for New South Wales, she competed in the 2011 National Championships, and was named the tournament's MVP. At the 2012 Australian National Championships, her New South Wales team finished second, and she was awarded the Ladies' MVP and the Kenaghan Medal, which was awarded at the end of the tournament.

Taylor made her national team debut in 2010 at the World Championships in Britain. It was the first time the national team had played in three years. The team finished sixth at the 2011 IBSA Goalball World Cup, where she scored her first international goal in a game against the Spain women's national goalball team. She competed in the 2011 IBSA Africa Oceania Goalball Regional Champions that were hosted in Turkey, which served as the Paralympic qualifying tournament. In her first game against New Zealand, her team won 11-4 after leading 7–1 at the half time break. She scored one goal in the team's victory. Australia won the final game against New Zealand by a score of 6–2. She played in the game against New Zealand women's national goalball team with Taylor scoring a pair of goals in the game.

Taylor was named to the Aussie Belles that was going to the 2012 Summer Paralympics. That the team qualified for the Games came as a surprise, as the Australian Paralympic Committee had been working on player development with an idea of the team qualifying for the 2016 Summer Paralympics, and an Australian team had not participated since the 2000 Summer Paralympics, when they earned an automatic selection as hosts, and the team finished last in the competition. Going into the Paralympics, her team was ranked eighth in the world. The Australian Paralympic Committee had chosen to work on her development as a goalball player with the idea that she might be able to qualify for and win a medal at the 2016 Summer Paralympics. Taylor debuted the national team's Paralympic uniform on 1 May 2012 at the Sydney Overseas Passenger Terminal on day two of the Mercedes-Benz Fashion Week Australia Spring/Summer 2012/13. In the 2012 Summer Paralympics tournament, the Belles played games against Japan, Canada, the United States and Sweden. They lost every game, and did not advance to the finals.

The Belles originally failed to qualify for the 2016 Paralympics after finishing third at the IBSA Goalball Asia Pacific Championships in Hangzhou, China. They were displaced to allow for an African team, Algeria as it turned out, to compete in goalball for the first time. But following the re-allocation of Russia's spot, the Belles found themselves getting a last minute invite to Rio. They entered the tournament ranked ninth in the world. They performed better this time, fighting Uzbekistan to a draw, but they needed a win or draw in their final game against Canada to progress to the quarter finals, but lost 6–0, ending their second Paralympic campaign.

At the 2020 Summer Paralympics, Taylor and the other members of the Belles team comprising Meica Horsburgh, Raissa Martin, Amy Ridley, Brodie Smith, and Jennifer Blow won two group stage games out of four and qualified for the quarterfinals. The team lost to Turkey 10-6 and failed to win a medal.

== See also ==
- Australia women's national goalball team
