= Meica Horsburgh =

Australian goalball player

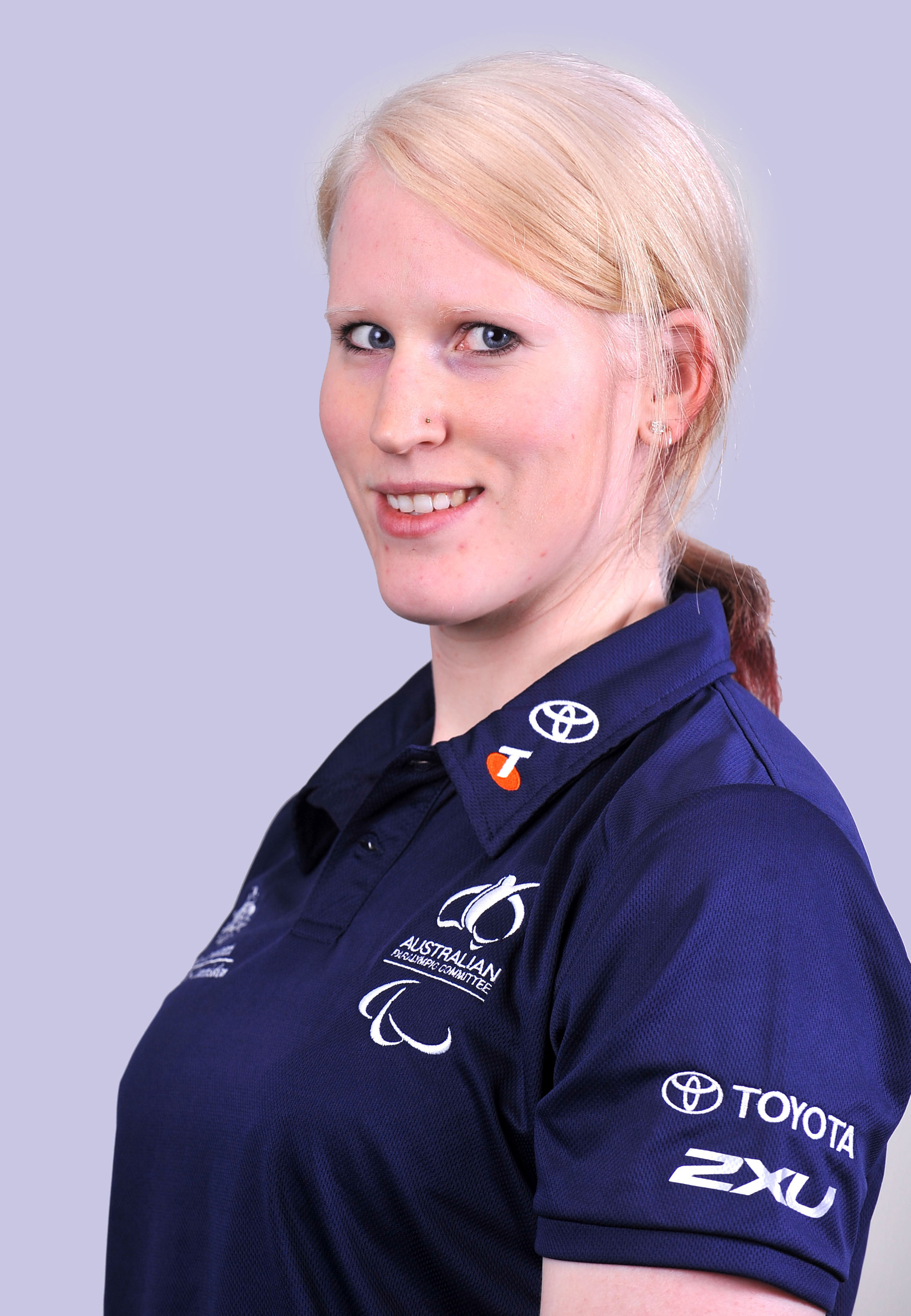
- 2012 Australian Paralympic team portrait of Christensen

Personal information
- Full name: Meica Jayne Horsburgh
- Nationality: Australian
- Born: Meica Jayne Christensen; 24 February 1989 (age 37) Wynnum North, Queensland

Sport
- Country: Australia
- Sport: Goalball

Achievements and titles
- Paralympic finals: 2012

Meica Jayne Horsburgh (née Christensen; born 24 February 1989) is an Australian goalball player. She began playing the sport in 2004, the same year she made her national team debut. After the national team took a three-year break, she was named the captain in 2010 and played in the Goalball World Championships. She represented Australia at the 2012 Summer Paralympics and was at the 2016 Summer Paralympics and 2020 Summer Paralympics.

== Personal ==
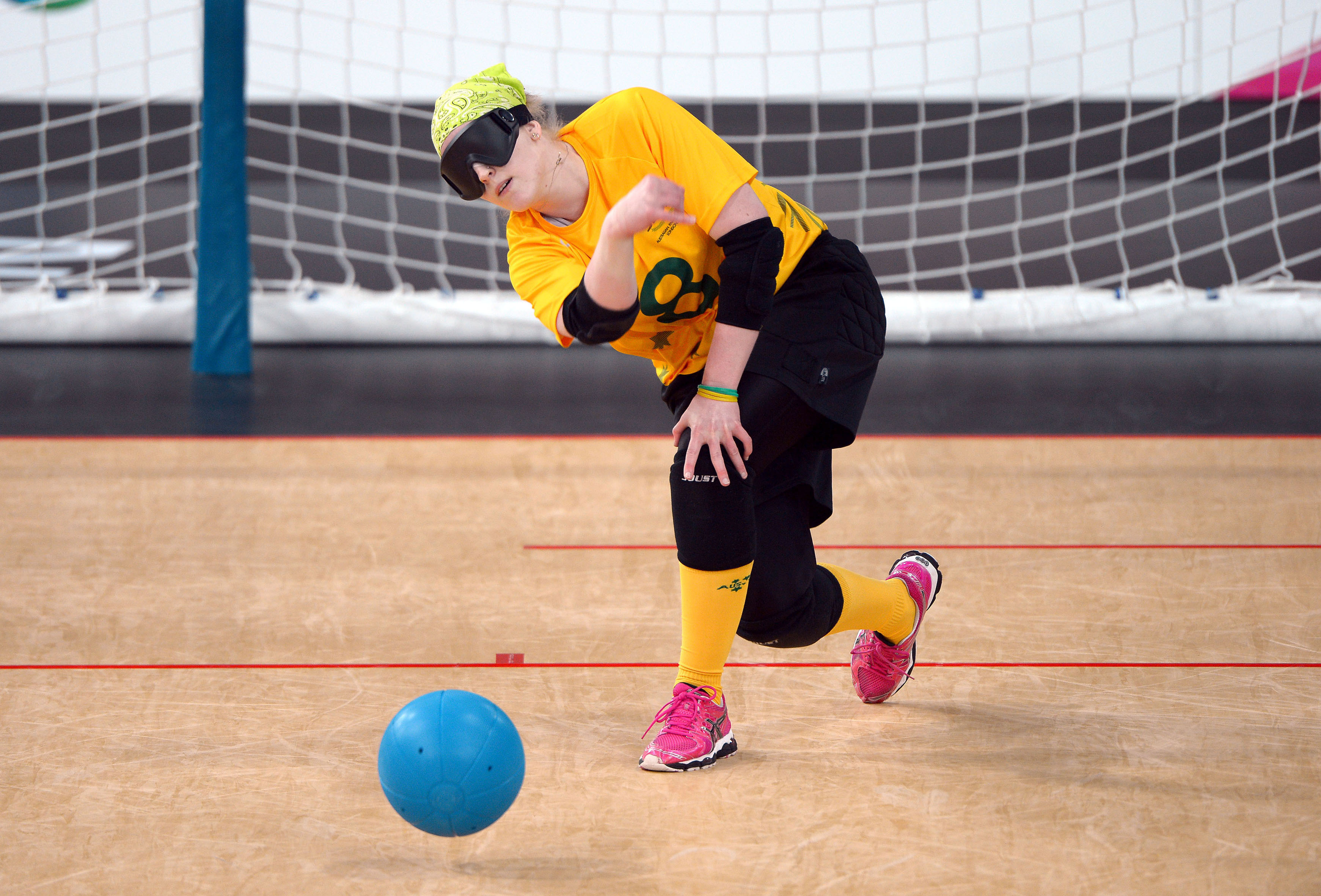
Horsburgh at the 2012 London Paralympics

Horsburgh was born in Wynnum North, Queensland, on 24 February 1989. She has a visual disability, with partial sight. She attended Cavendish Road State High School, and played in a goalball demonstration game there in 2004. Other sports she participates in include skiing. In 2005, she lived in Birkdale, Queensland, but was living in Wellington Point again by 2011. In 2011, she worked at Royal Brisbane and Women's Hospital as an administrator. She is married to Australian goalball player Jon Horsburgh.

== Goalball ==
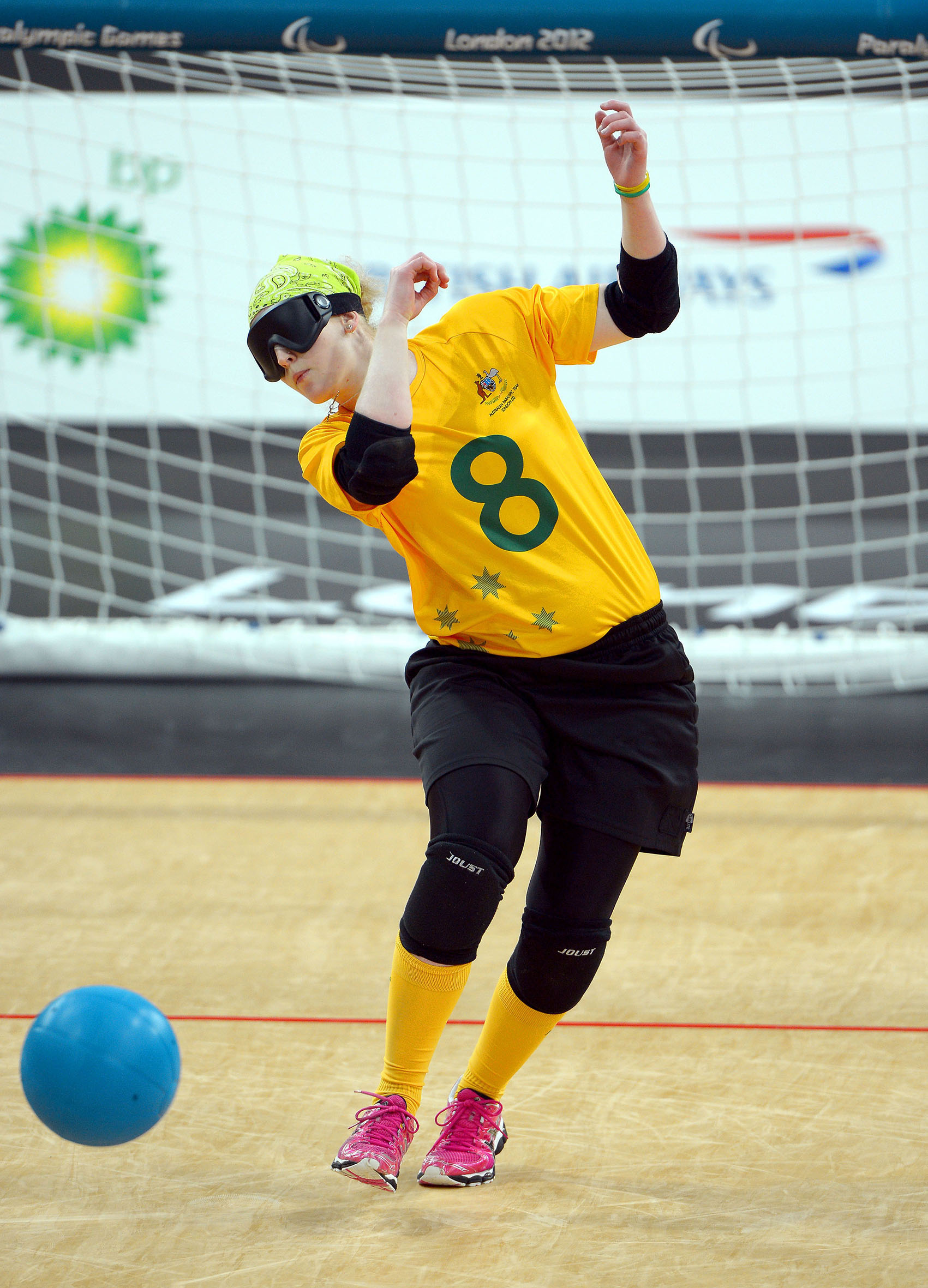
Horsburgh at the 2012 London Paralympics

Horsburgh is a goalball player, and is classified as a B3 competitor. She started playing the sport in 2004, when she was 15-years-old. In 2005, she played in the New Zealand Goalball Nationals for the Queensland women's goalball team.

Horsburgh made her national team debut in 2004, the same year she started playing the sport, when she played in a game against Sweden women's national goalball team in Malmö, Sweden, as part of a ten-team Malmö Women's International Cup that included seven teams that had qualified for the 2004 Summer Paralympics. She was coached in the competition by Robyn Stephens.

In late 2004, she had a goal of making the Paralympic team for the 2008 Summer Paralympics, but the Australian team did not qualify. She was named the national team captain in 2010. In her role as captain, she plays the song "The Final Countdown" before competitions. Going into the 2010 Goalball World Championships with the national team not having played a match in three years, her team finished eighth.

She was the national team captain again in 2011, and was with the team during the 2011 IBSA Africa Oceania Goalball Regional Champions, which served as the Paralympic qualifying tournament. In her first game against New Zealand, her team won 11-4 after leading 7–1 at the half. She scored seven goals in the team's victory. She also played in the final match against New Zealand women's national goalball team. Australia won the game against New Zealand by a score of 6–2, Horsburgh scored three goals, the second one from a penalty shot. She finished the competition as the fifth highest scorer, and her team finished sixth overall.

Horsburgh was named to the Aussie Belles team going to the 2012 Summer Paralympics. She was the team's longest serving member going into the Games, and the team's captain. That the team qualified for the Games came as a surprise, as the Australian Paralympic Committee had been working on player development with an idea of the team qualifying for the 2016 Summer Paralympics, and an Australian team had not participated since the 2000 Summer Paralympics, when they earned an automatic selection as hosts, and the team finished last in the competition. The country has not medalled in the event since 1976. Going into the Paralympic Games, her team was ranked eighth in the world. In the 2012 Summer Paralympics tournament, the Belles played games against Japan, Canada, the United States and Sweden. They lost every game, and did not advance to the finals. She scored three goals.

The Belles originally failed to qualify for the 2016 Paralympic Games after finishing third at the IBSA Goalball Asia Pacific Championships in Hangzhou, China. They were displaced to allow for an African team, Algeria as it turned out, to compete in goalball for the first time. But following the re-allocation of Russia's spot, the Belles found themselves getting a last-minute invite to Rio de Janeiro. They entered the tournament ranked ninth in the world. They performed better this time, fighting Uzbekistan to a draw, but they needed a win or draw in their final game against Canada to progress to the quarter finals, but lost 6–0, ending their second Paralympic campaign.

At the 2020 Summer Paralympics, Horsburgh and the other members of the Belles team comprising Raissa Martin, Jennifer Blow, Amy Ridley, Brodie Smith, and Tyan Taylor won two group stage games out of four and qualified for the quarterfinals. The team lost to Turkey 10-6 and failed to win a medal. Horsburgh was the leading goal scorer, scoring in every game she played, except for the loss to China where Australia were beaten 6–0.

== See also ==
- Australia women's national goalball team
