= Goalball World Championships =

International sport tournament

- Highest governing body: IBSA
- First played: 1978

Characteristics
- Contact: None
- Type: Team sport; ball game; parasport
- Equipment: Goalball; Eyeshades

Presence
- Country or region: Worldwide
- Paralympic: 1976

The IBSA Goalball World Championships is an international goalball tournament held every four years, since 1978, between Paralympic Games goalball tournaments. It is organised by the International Blind Sports Federation (IBSA) Goalball Subcommittee.

A 'world' youth-level championships was created in 2005. It was not officially recognised in the Rules until the 2014–2017 version, and has no prescribed selection process unlike the World Championships or Paralympic Games tournaments. Games are undertaken with the standard 1.25 kilograms (2.8 lb) competition ball.

Qualification for the World Championships is usually through Africa, Asia-Pacific, America, and Europe regional championships.

== Hostings ==
=== 1978 Voecklamarkt ===
The inaugural world championships were held in Vöcklamarkt, Austria. Final ranked men's teams were: Germany, Austria, Denmark, Italy, Belgium, Israel, Canada, United States of America, South Africa, Great Britain.

=== 1982 Indianapolis ===
The 1982 Goalball World Championships was held at Butler University, Indianapolis, Indiana, United States of America. Final ranked teams were:

Men: United States of America, The Netherlands, Egypt, Canada, Austria, Great Britain, Germany, Denmark, Yugoslavia, Israel, France, Mexico.
Women: United States of America, Denmark, Canada, The Netherlands, Austria, Mexico.

=== 1986 Roermond ===
The 1986 Goalball World Championships was held at Roermond, The Netherlands. Final ranked teams were:

Men: Yugoslavia, Israel, Egypt, United States of America, Italy, Hungary, Austria, Finland, Bulgaria, Belgium, Canada, Poland, The Netherlands, Germany, Denmark, Great Britain, Australia, France.
Women: United States of America, Denmark, The Netherlands, Finland, Germany, Canada, Great Britain, Australia, Belgium, Egypt.

=== 1990 Calgary ===
The 1990 Goalball World Championships was held in Calgary, Alberta, Canada. Final ranked teams were:

Men: Germany, Italy, Yugoslavia, Israel, United States of America, Canada, Finland, The Netherlands, USSR, Great Britain, Hungary, Australia.
Women: Denmark, United States of America, Finland, Germany, The Netherlands, Canada, South Korea.

=== 1994 Colorado Springs ===
The 1994 Goalball World Championships was held in Colorado Springs, Colorado, United States of America. Final ranked teams were:

Men: Finland, Italy, Slovenia, Spain, Canada, Czech Republic, The Netherlands, United States of America, Israel, Great Britain, Germany, Australia, Mexico.
Women: Finland, Germany, Sweden, Denmark, Canada, The Netherlands, Spain, United States of America, Mexico.

=== 1998 Madrid ===
The 1998 Goalball World Championships was held in Madrid, Spain. Final ranked teams were:

Men: Slovenia, Spain, Lithuania, Denmark, Sweden, Canada, Finland, United States of America, Australia, South Africa, Italy, Iran, Kuwait, Egypt, Algeria, Mexico.
Women: Finland, Sweden, United States of America, Great Britain, Spain, The Netherlands, Denmark, Germany, Canada, Australia, Argentina.

=== 2002 Rio de Janeiro ===
The 2002 Goalball World Championships was held in Rio de Janeiro, Brazil. The new long ball penalty rule was played (the ball must bounce once in each of the neutral areas), but quickly dismissed and the penalty reverted to the previous rule (the ball must bounce at least once in one or both of the neutral areas). There were fourteen men's and ten women's teams. The pools were:

Men:

Pool A: Algeria, Australia, Canada, Denmark, Slovenia, South Korea, Spain.
Pool B: Brazil, Germany, Hungary, Japan, Lithuania, Sweden, United States of America.

Women:

Pool A: Canada, Denmark, The Netherland, South Korea, United States of America.
Pool B: Brazil, Germany, Japan, Spain, Sweden.

Final ranked teams were:

Men: Sweden, Lithuania, Slovenia, Denmark, Germany, Hungary, Spain, Canada, Brazil, Australia, United States of America, Algeria, South Korea, Japan.
Women: United States of America, Canada, Netherlands, Germany, Sweden, Spain, Denmark, Brazil, Japan, South Korea.

=== 2006 Spartanburg ===
The 2006 Goalball World Championships was held in Spartanburg, South Carolina, United States of America. Hall 1 was in the main basketball court of the University of South Carolina Upstate, while Hall 2 was at the nearby Lone Oak Elementary School. Most athletes stayed in the residences of the university.

The teams were:

Men: Australia, Canada, China, Denmark, Finland, Germany, Iran, Japan, Lithuania, Mexico, Slovenia, South Korea, Spain, Sweden, United States of America.
Women: Australia, Canada, Denmark, Finland, Germany, Greece, The Netherlands, Japan, South Africa, South Korea, United States of America.

=== 2010 Sheffield ===
The 2010 Goalball World Championships was held in Sheffield, England, from 20 to 25 June 2010. The tournament was held in both halls of the English Institute of Sport. Officials and many athletes stayed at the Novotel Hotel in the Sheffield City Centre. Sponsorship and many volunteers were provided by Cadbury and other corporations. The organising committee used the Twitter account 'worldgoalball'.

There were sixteen men's and twelve women's teams. The pools were:

Men

Pool A: Algeria, Belgium (12th), Canada, China, Germany, Great Britain, Iran, United States of America.
Pool B: Australia, Brazil, Denmark, Hungary (11th), Lithuania, Slovenia, Spain, Sweden.

Women

Pool X: Australia, Canada, Greece (12th), Israel, Sweden, United States of America.
Pool Y: China, Denmark, Finland, Great Britain (11th), Japan, Russia.

=== 2014 Espoo ===
The 2014 Goalball World Championships was held in Espoo, Finland, from 30 June to 5 July 2014. A webcam was also used to broadcast the games at the tournament.

The pools were:

Men

Pool A: Algeria, Spain, Iran, Germany, Finland, Czech Republic, Ukraine, United States of America
Pool B: Belgium, Brazil, Egypt, Japan, Canada, China, Lithuania, Turkey.

Women

Pool X: Japan, Germany, Finland, Turkey, United States of America, Russia
Pool Y: Brazil, Iran, Israel, China, Sweden, Ukraine.

=== 2018 Malmö ===
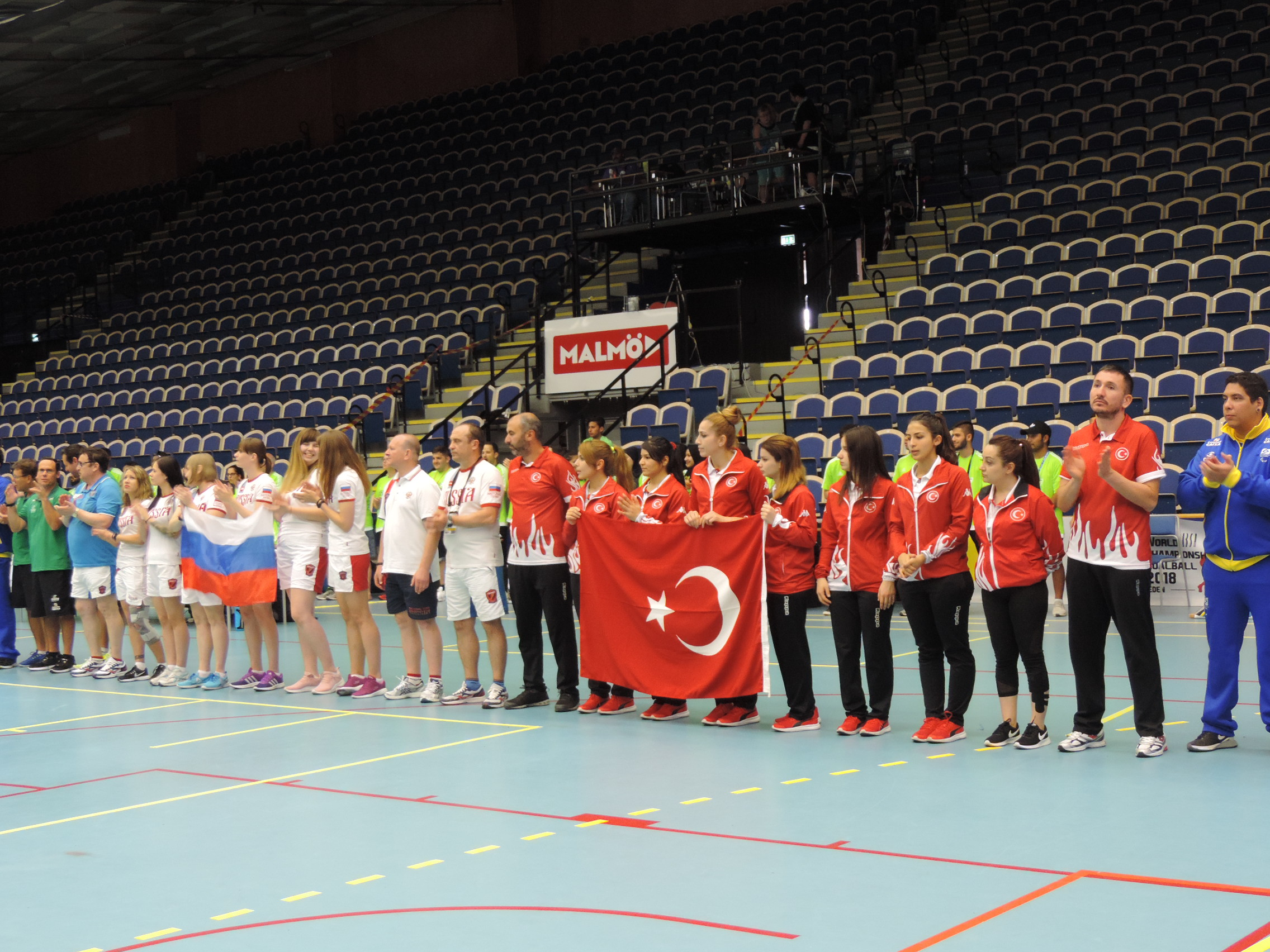
Finalists of the women's division of the 2018 IBSA Goalball World Championships in Malmö, Sweden. Shows gold medal Russia (mid), silver medal Turkey (right), and start of bronze medal Brazil (left).

The 2018 Goalball World Championships were held at Malmö, Sweden, for Sunday 3 to Friday 8 June 2018, with 16 men's teams and 12 women's teams. The international subcommittee has determined the 2014–2017 Rules about the world championships will apply in 2018. The 2018–2021 Rules states there will be 16 men's and 16 women's teams, which may be the format for the 2022 championships.

Held at the Baltiska Hallen sports and entertainment centre, Hall 2 was at the Baltiska träningshallen. The warm-up court was across the road from the main halls. The pools are:

Men:

Pool A: Algeria, Argentina, Australia, Belgium, China, Lithuania, Sweden, Turkey.
Pool B: Brazil, Canada, Czech Republic, Egypt, Germany, Iran, Japan, United States of America.

Women:

Pool X: Australia, Israel, Japan, Russia, Sweden, Turkey.
Pool Y: Algeria, Brazil, Canada, China, Greece, United States of America.

Final standings were (starting with first place):

Men:

Brazil, Germany, Belgium, Lithuania, USA, Iran, China, Sweden, Japan, Turkey, Algeria, Canada, Argentina, Czech Republic, Australia, Egypt.

Women:

Russia, Turkey, Brazil, Canada, Japan, USA, Algeria, Australia, Greece, China, Israel, Sweden.

=== 2022 Matosinhos ===
The 2022 Goalball World Championships were scheduled to be held in Hangzhou, China, to commence Monday, 5 June 2022, although originally set for Sunday 3 to Friday 15 July 2022. Some precursor regional championships were moved due to the ongoing COVID-19 pandemic: IBSA America moved from 6 to 13 November 2021 to 18 to 22 February 2022, and IBSA Asia moved from November 2021 to commence 21 March 2022.

By June 2022, the IBSA Asia Regional Championships were moved from South Korea to the ISA Sport City at Bahrain for July 2022, and the Centro de Desportos e Congressos de Matosinhos, Portugal, to be the location for the World Championships from 7 to 16 December 2022.

Final standings were (starting with first place):

Men:

Brazil, China, Ukraine, Lithuania, Turkey, Japan, Germany, Iran, United States, Belgium, Argentina, Portugal, Canada, Algeria, Egypt, Colombia.

Women:

Turkey, South Korea, Canada, Israel, Japan, United States, Great Britain, Denmark, Brazil, Algeria, Australia, France, Argentina, Egypt, Mexico, Portugal.

=== 2026 Hangzhou ===
The 2026 Goalball World Championships was held at Hangzhou, China, from Saturday 6 to Tuesday 16 June 2026, with 16 men's teams and 16 women's teams.

Prior to the event there were a number of issues, including the involvement of the new IBSA Legal and Ethics Committee about the ratio formula methodology (regulation 47.2) (December 2025), re-explanation of the qualification process (January 2026), a recalculation of the ratio formula (February 2026), and final pools set less than 90 days from the tournament commencement. On 29 April 2026 it was announced Iran men had withdrawn (noting the US war was occurring at the time) and Poland would have that slot; and on 10 May 2026, Chile women had withdrawn, and Thailand would have that slot.

The teams were:

Men: Algeria, Argentina, Australia, Brazil, Canada, China, Egypt, Finland, Germany, Israel, Japan, Poland, Thailand, Türkiye, Ukraine, and the United States.
Women: Argentina, Brazil, Canada, China, Finland, Great Britain, Greece, Israel, Japan, Mexico, Poland, South Korea, Thailand, Türkiye, Ukraine, and the United States.

Final standings were:

Men: China (1st), Germany (2nd), Brazil (3rd), Japan (4th).
Women: China (1st), Israel (2nd), Türkiye (3rd), United States (4th).

== World championship results ==
=== Men ===
| Year | Host (final location) | Gold medal game | | | Bronze medal game |
|---|---|---|---|---|---|---|---|
| Year | Host (final location) | Gold | Score | Silver | Bronze | Score | Fourth place |
| 1978 | (Austria) (Voecklamarkt) | Germany | | Austria | Denmark | | Italy |
| 1982 | (United States) (Indianapolis) | United States | | Netherlands | Egypt | | Canada |
| 1986 | (Netherlands) (Roermond) | Yugoslavia | | Israel | Egypt | | United States |
| 1990 | (Canada) (Calgary) | Germany | | Italy | Yugoslavia | | Israel |
| 1994 | (United States) (Colorado Springs) | Finland | | Italy | Slovenia | | Spain |
| 1998 | (Spain) (Madrid) | Slovenia | | Spain | Lithuania | | Denmark |
| 2002 | (Brazil) (Rio de Janeiro) | Sweden | | Lithuania | Slovenia | | Denmark |
| 2006 | (United States) (Spartanburg) | Lithuania | | Sweden | United States | | Slovenia |
| 2010 | (United Kingdom) (Sheffield) | Lithuania | | China | Iran | | United States |
| 2014 | (Finland) (Espoo) | Brazil | 9–1 | Finland | United States | 4–2 | Lithuania |
| 2018 | (Sweden) (Malmö) | Brazil | 8–3 | Germany | Belgium | 9–2 | Lithuania |
| 2022 | (Portugal) (Matosinhos) | Brazil | 6–5 | China | Ukraine | 6–2 | Lithuania |
| 2026 | (China) (Hangzhou) | China | 7–1 | Germany | Brazil | 10–6 | Japan |

Men's medal count

| Rank | Nation | Gold | Silver | Bronze | Total |
|---|---|---|---|---|---|
| 1 | Brazil (BRA) | 3 | 0 | 1 | 4 |
| 2 | Germany (GER) | 2 | 2 | 0 | 4 |
| 3 | Lithuania (LTU) | 2 | 1 | 1 | 4 |
| 4 | China (CHN) | 1 | 2 | 0 | 3 |
| 5 | Finland (FIN) | 1 | 1 | 0 | 2 |
| 5 | Sweden (SWE) | 1 | 1 | 0 | 2 |
| 7 | Slovenia (SLO) | 1 | 0 | 2 | 3 |
| 7 | United States (USA) | 1 | 0 | 2 | 3 |
| 9 | Yugoslavia (YUG) | 1 | 0 | 1 | 2 |
| 10 | Italy (ITA) | 0 | 2 | 0 | 2 |
| 11 | Austria (AUT) | 0 | 1 | 0 | 1 |
| 11 | Israel (ISR) | 0 | 1 | 0 | 1 |
| 11 | Netherlands (NED) | 0 | 1 | 0 | 1 |
| 11 | Spain (ESP) | 0 | 1 | 0 | 1 |
| 15 | Egypt (EGY) | 0 | 0 | 2 | 2 |
| 16 | Belgium (BEL) | 0 | 0 | 1 | 1 |
| 16 | Denmark (DEN) | 0 | 0 | 1 | 1 |
| 16 | Iran (IRI) | 0 | 0 | 1 | 1 |
| 16 | Ukraine (UKR) | 0 | 0 | 1 | 1 |
| Totals (19 entries) | | 13 | 13 | 13 | 39 |

=== Women ===
| Year | Host (final location) | Gold medal game | | | Bronze medal game |
|---|---|---|---|---|---|---|---|
| Year | Host (final location) | Gold | Score | Silver | Bronze | Score | Fourth place |
| 1982 | (United States) (Indianapolis) | United States | | Denmark | Canada | | Netherlands |
| 1986 | (Netherlands) (Roermond) | United States | | Denmark | Netherlands | | Finland |
| 1990 | (Canada) (Calgary) | Denmark | | United States | Finland | | Germany |
| 1994 | (United States) (Colorado Springs) | Finland | | Germany | Sweden | | Denmark |
| 1998 | (Spain) (Madrid) | Finland | | Sweden | United States | | Great Britain |
| 2002 | (Brazil) (Rio de Janeiro) | United States | | Canada | Netherlands | | Germany |
| 2006 | (United States) (Spartanburg) | Canada | | China | United States | | Denmark |
| 2010 | (United Kingdom) (Sheffield) | China | | United States | Sweden | | Canada |
| 2014 | (Finland) (Espoo) | United States | 3–0 | Russia | Turkey | 3–0 | Japan |
| 2018 | (Sweden) (Malmö) | Russia | 4–3 | Turkey | Brazil | 7–2 | Canada |
| 2022 | (Portugal) (Matosinhos) | Turkey | 10–4 | South Korea | Israel | 4–2 | Canada |
| 2026 | (China) (Hangzhou) | China | 12–4 | Israel | Turkey | 5–2 | United States |

Women's medal count

| Rank | Nation | Gold | Silver | Bronze | Total |
|---|---|---|---|---|---|
| 1 | United States (USA) | 4 | 2 | 2 | 8 |
| 2 | China (CHN) | 2 | 1 | 0 | 3 |
| 3 | Finland (FIN) | 2 | 0 | 1 | 3 |
| 4 | Denmark (DEN) | 1 | 2 | 0 | 3 |
| 5 | Turkey (TUR) | 1 | 1 | 2 | 4 |
| 6 | Canada (CAN) | 1 | 1 | 1 | 3 |
| 7 | Russia (RUS) | 1 | 1 | 0 | 2 |
| 8 | Sweden (SWE) | 0 | 1 | 2 | 3 |
| 9 | Israel (ISR) | 0 | 1 | 1 | 2 |
| 10 | Germany (GER) | 0 | 1 | 0 | 1 |
| 10 | South Korea (KOR) | 0 | 1 | 0 | 1 |
| 12 | Netherlands (NED) | 0 | 0 | 2 | 2 |
| 13 | Brazil (BRA) | 0 | 0 | 1 | 1 |
| Totals (13 entries) | | 12 | 12 | 12 | 36 |

== Youth championships ==
A age limit of 19 was in place by 2017 at Budaörs, and the 2018–2021 Rules updated in May 2020 to define a youth member as "not be older than 19 years of age on 31 December of the year the competition is held". A trial change was made for 2026 in Astana.

From 2026, the youth championships will be held every two years.

=== 2005 Colorado ===
The 2005 Junior World Championships were held in Colorado Springs, Colorado, United States of America. There were boys teams (including Canada, Germany, Russia, Sweden, Turkey, United States of America), and three national girls teams (Great Britain, South Africa, United States of America).

- Final boys ranking: United States of America (1st).
- Final girls ranking: United States of America (1st), Great Britain (2nd), South Africa (3rd).

=== 2007 Colorado ===
On 14 July 2007, the IBSA World Youth and Student Games 2007 were held. Eight countries attended, eight boys teams (Brazil, Canada, Germany, Hungary, Lithuania, Russia, Thailand, United States of America) and four girls teams (Canada, Germany, Russia, United States of America).

- Final boys ranking: Germany (1st), United States of America (2nd), Hungary (3rd), Canada, Lithuania, Russia, Brazil, Thailand.
- Final girls ranking: United States of America (1st), Germany (2nd), Russia (3rd), Canada.

=== 2009 Colorado ===
From 16 to 19 July 2009, the IBSA World Youth and Student Championships, in conjunction with the 2009 IBSA Pan American Games, were held in Colorado Springs, Colorado, United States of America.

Six countries attended, six boys teams (Bolivia, Canada, Germany, Kuwait, Russia, United States of America), and four girls teams (Canada, Germany, Russia, United States of America).

- Final boys ranking: United States of America (1st), Canada (2nd), Germany (3rd), Russia.
- Final girls ranking: Russia (1st).

=== 2011 Colorado ===
From 14 July 2011, the IBSA World Youth and Student Championships and Pan Am Games, also known as the 2011 IBSA World Youth Championships, were held at Colorado College's El Pomar Gymnasium, Colorado Springs, Colorado, United States of America.

Athletes were to be at least twelve years old on 13 July 2011 and not older than nineteen years old on 18 July 2011, and have a visual impairment classification of B1, B2, or B3.

- Final boys ranking: South Korea (1st), Germany (2nd).
- Final girls ranking: Russia (1st).

=== 2013 Colorado ===
From 13 July 2013, the IBSA Goalball World Youth Championships were held in Colorado Springs, Colorado, United States of America. Ten countries attended, nine boys teams (Australia, Brazil, Germany, Japan, Russia, South Korea, Sweden, Turkey, United States of America) and seven girls teams (Australia, Brazil, Canada, Germany, South Korea, United States of America).

- Final boys ranking: Japan (1st), United States of America (2nd), Brazil (3rd), Canada (4th).
- Final girls ranking: Russia (1st), Brazil (2nd), United States of America (3rd), Australia (4th).

=== 2015 Colorado ===
From 26 July 2015 to 1 August 2015, the 2015 IBSA World Youth Games Goalball Championships were held in Colorado Springs, Colorado, United States of America. Seven countries attended, six boys teams (Canada, Germany, Hungary, South Korea, Sweden, United States of America) and five girls teams (Canada, China, Germany, South Korea, United States of America).

- Final boys ranking: Germany (1st), Sweden (2nd), United States of America (3rd), Hungary.
- Final girls ranking: Canada (1st), United States of America (2nd), China (3rd), Germany.

=== 2017 Budaörs ===
From 30 June 2017 to 9 July 2017, the IBSA Goalball World Youth Championships were held in Budaörs, Hungary. Organised by the Hungarian Paralympic Committee together with the Hungarian Handball Federation, athletes were to be no older than 19 as of 31 December 2017, and a visual impairment classification of B1, B2, or B3. Eleven countries attended, ten boys teams (Brazil, Germany, Hungary, Israel, Poland, Russia, South Korea, Spain, Sweden, United States of America), and nine girls teams (Australia, Brazil, Germany, Hungary, Israel, Russia, South Korea, Spain, United States of America).

- Final boys ranking: United States of America (1st), Brazil (2nd), Russia (3rd), Hungary, Poland, Israel, Sweden, South Korea, Germany, Spain.
- Final girls ranking: Australia (1st), Russia (2nd), Brazil (3rd), Germany, United States of America, Israel, South Korea, Hungary, Spain.

=== 2019 Sydney ===
From Monday 5 August 2019 to Friday 9 August 2019 as competition days, the eighth IBSA Goalball World Youth Championships were held in Penrith, Sydney, Australia. Organised by the New South Wales Goalball Association together with Goalball Australia and Blind Sports Australia, eight countries are expected to attend, six boys teams (Australia, Brazil, South Korea, Poland, Sweden, Thailand), and six girls teams (Australia, Brazil, Germany, Great Britain, South Korea, Thailand).

- Final boys ranking: Thailand (1st), Brazil (2nd), Sweden (3rd), Poland, South Korea, Australia.
- Final girls ranking: Brazil (1st), Australia (2nd), Great Britain (3rd), South Korea, Germany, Thailand.

=== 2023 São Paulo ===
The 2021 IBSA Goalball Youth World Championships were scheduled to be held in São Paulo, Brazil, for Tuesday 27 to Saturday 31 July 2021. Due to a busy 2021 competition year with rescheduled events due to the COVID-19 pandemic, it was announced the tournament is to be held on Tuesday 15 to Sunday 20 March 2022. Due to the ongoing global pandemic, the date was moved again to 9 to 16 July 2023.

- Final boys ranking: Israel (1st), Poland (2nd), Brazil (3rd), South Korea (4th), US (5th), Kenya (6th).
- Final girls ranking: Turkey (1st), Australia (2nd), Israel (3rd), Brasil (4th), Germany (5th), South Korea (6th), Kenya (7th).

=== 2026 Astana ===
The 2026 IBSA Goalball Youth World Championships are scheduled to be held in Astana, Kazakhstan, for Tuesday 25 November 2026 to Saturday 5 December 2026. The age limit was changed from 19 years of age for male and female, to 21-and-under for males and 23-and-under for females, to allow a tournament to be held.

== See also ==
- Goalball at the Summer Paralympics
