= Asia Goalball Championships =

Regional goalball tournament

- Highest governing body: International Blind Sports Federation

Characteristics
- Contact: None
- Mixed-sex: No
- Type: Team sport; ball game; parasport
- Equipment: Goalball, eyeshades

Presence
- Country or region: Asia region, Oceania region

IBSA Asia-Pacific Regional Goalball Championships is one of the four competition regions used for World Championships and Paralympic Games qualification for goalball, a team sport for athletes with a vision impairment. Conducted under the rules of the International Blind Sports Federation (IBSA), the other regions are Africa, America, and Europe.

The Asia regional goalball championships were merged with the Oceania regional goalball championships to form the Asia-Pacific championships in January 2010 with the introduction of the 2010–2014 rules.

== Asia hostings ==
Many pre-2010 regional championships were part of FESPIC Games (Far East and South Pacific Games for the Disabled Games), and the Asian Para Games. The 1999 FESPIC Games saw goalball played at the Thammasat University, Bangkok.

=== 2010 Guangzhou ===
The 2010 Asian Para Games was from 13 to 18 December 2010, at the Guangyao Gymnasium, Guangzhou, China.

There were nine men's teams: China, Iran, Iraq, Jordan, Japan, South Korea, Malaysia, Pakistan, and Thailand. China came first, South Korea second, and Iran third.

There were five men's teams: China, Iran, Japan, Laos, and South Korea. China came first, Japan second, and Iran third.

== Oceania hostings ==
Oceania Region was its own competitive region until January 2010. Until then, Australia was the most active competitive country in Oceania, and by default was the regional representative to the World Championships and Paralympic Games. A couple of trans-Tasman tournaments were held between Australia and New Zealand in lieu of a regional championship.

=== 2011 Sydney ===
Unable to attend the 2010 Asia regional championships for teams within Oceania, an IBSA African–Oceania regional championships was held from 15 to 17 November 2011 at the Sydney Olympic Park Sports Centre, Sydney Olympic Park, Sydney, New South Wales, Australia. This was the regional qualifier for the 2012 London Paralympic Games.

There were three men's teams: Algeria, Australia, New Zealand. Algeria came first, Australia second, and New Zealand third.

There were two women's teams: Australia, New Zealand. Australia came first.

== Asia-Pacific hostings ==
=== 2013 Beijing ===
The 2013 IBSA Asia Pacific Goalball Regional Championships was from 11 to 16 November 2013, in Beijing, China.

There were six men's teams: Australia, China, Iran, Japan, Mongolia, and Thailand). Iran came first, Japan second, and China third.

There were four women's teams: Australia, China, Iran, and Japan. China came first, Japan second, and Iran third.

=== 2015 Hangzhou ===
The 2015 IBSA Asia Pacific Goalball Regional Championships was from 8 to 12 November 2015, in the China National Goalball Training Centre, Hangzhou, China.

There were five men's teams: Australia, China, Iran, Japan, and South Korea. China came first, Iran second, and South Korea third.

There were five women's teams: Australia, China, Japan, Mongolia, Thailand. Japan came first, China second, and Australia third.

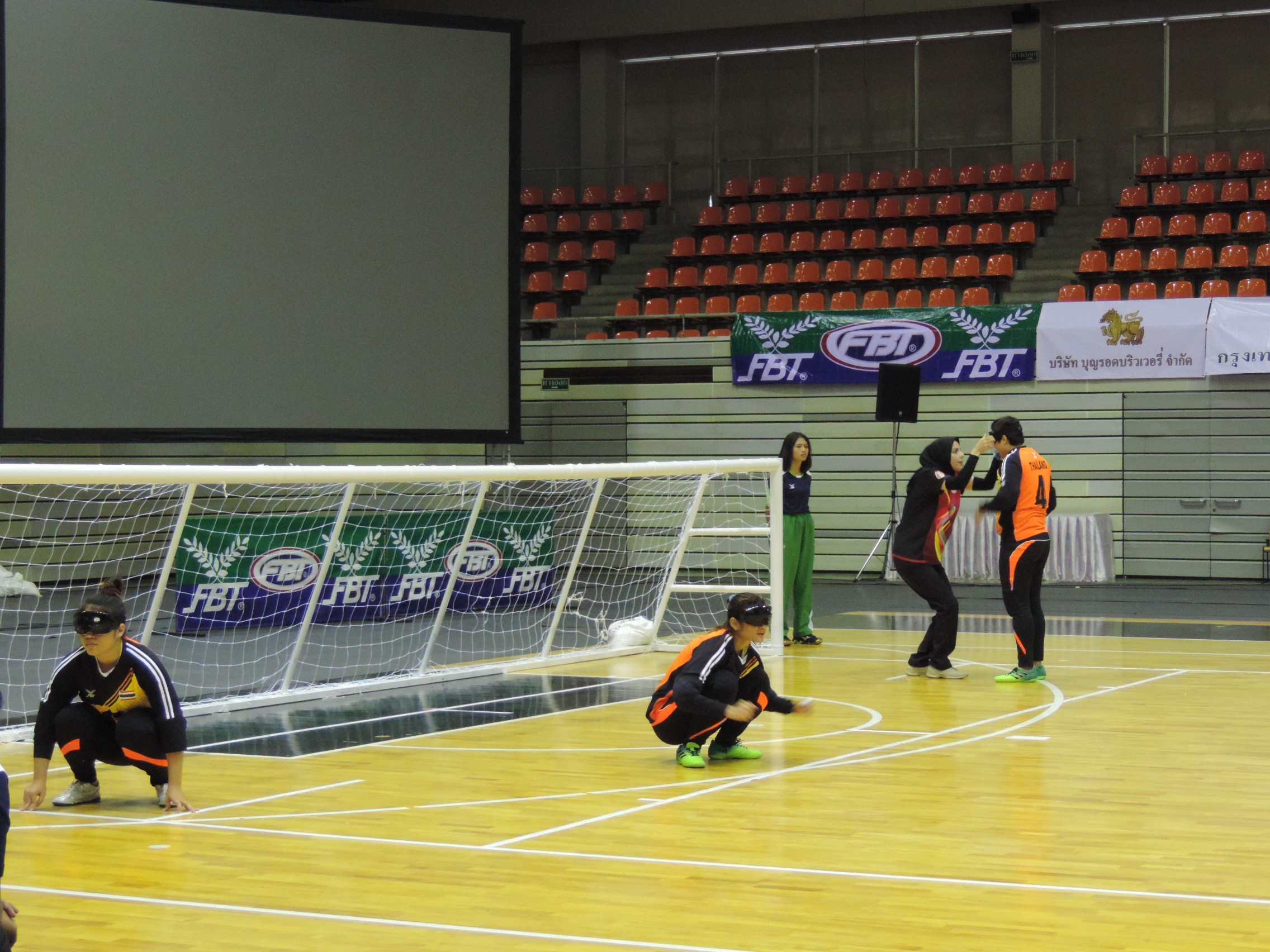
Thailand women with eyeshade inspection (2017).

=== 2017 Bangkok ===
The 2017 IBSA Asia/Pacific Goalball Regional Championships was from Monday 21 to Saturday 26 August 2017, in the Thai-Japan Sports Stadium, Din Daeng, Bangkok, Thailand.

There were eight men's teams: Australia, China, Iran, Iraq, Japan, Kazakhstan, South Korea, and Thailand. China came first, Iran second, and Japan third.

There were six women's teams: Australia, China, Iran, Japan, South Korea, and Thailand. Japan came first, China second, and Australia third.

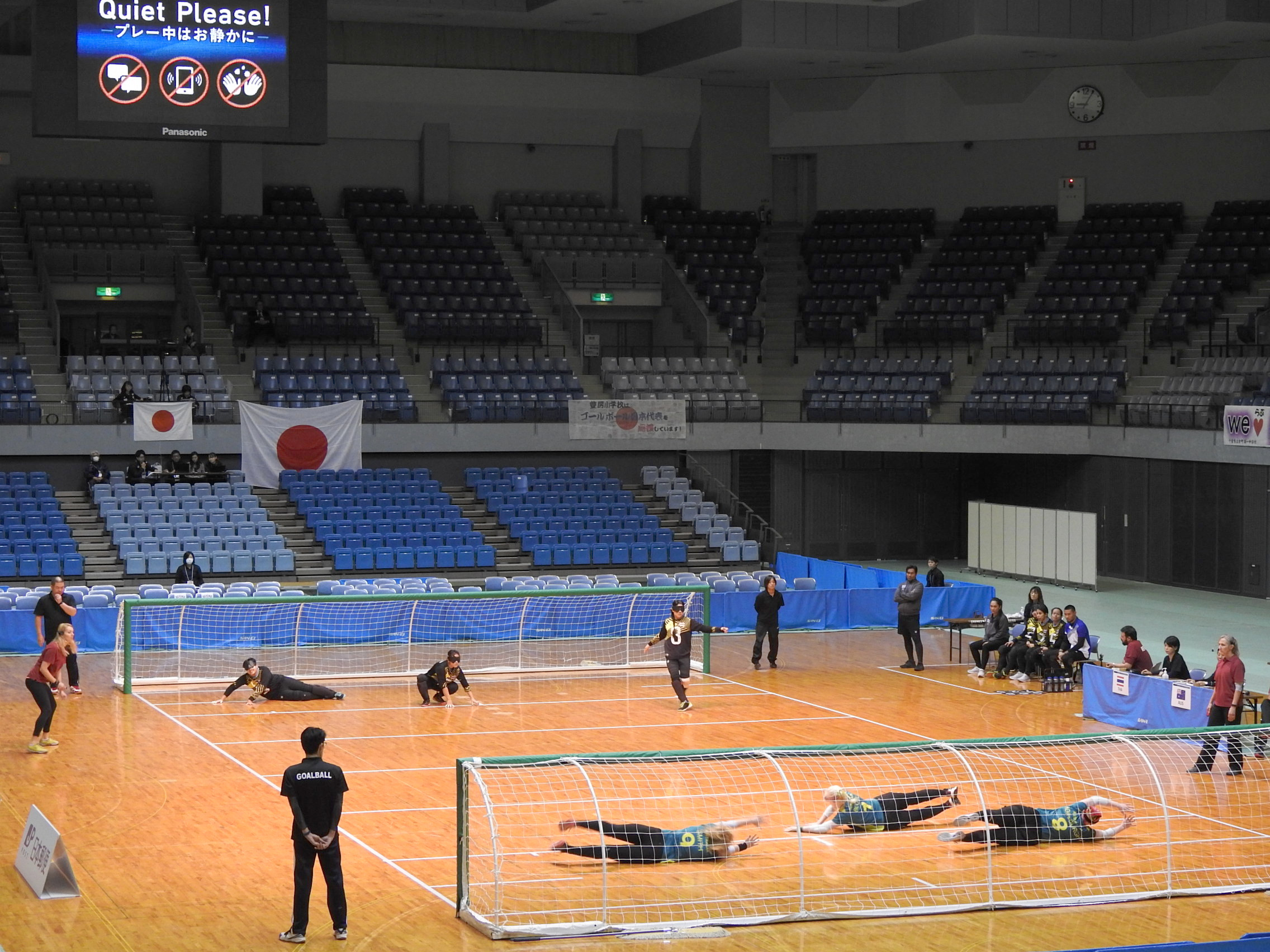
Australia women defending against Thailand (2019).

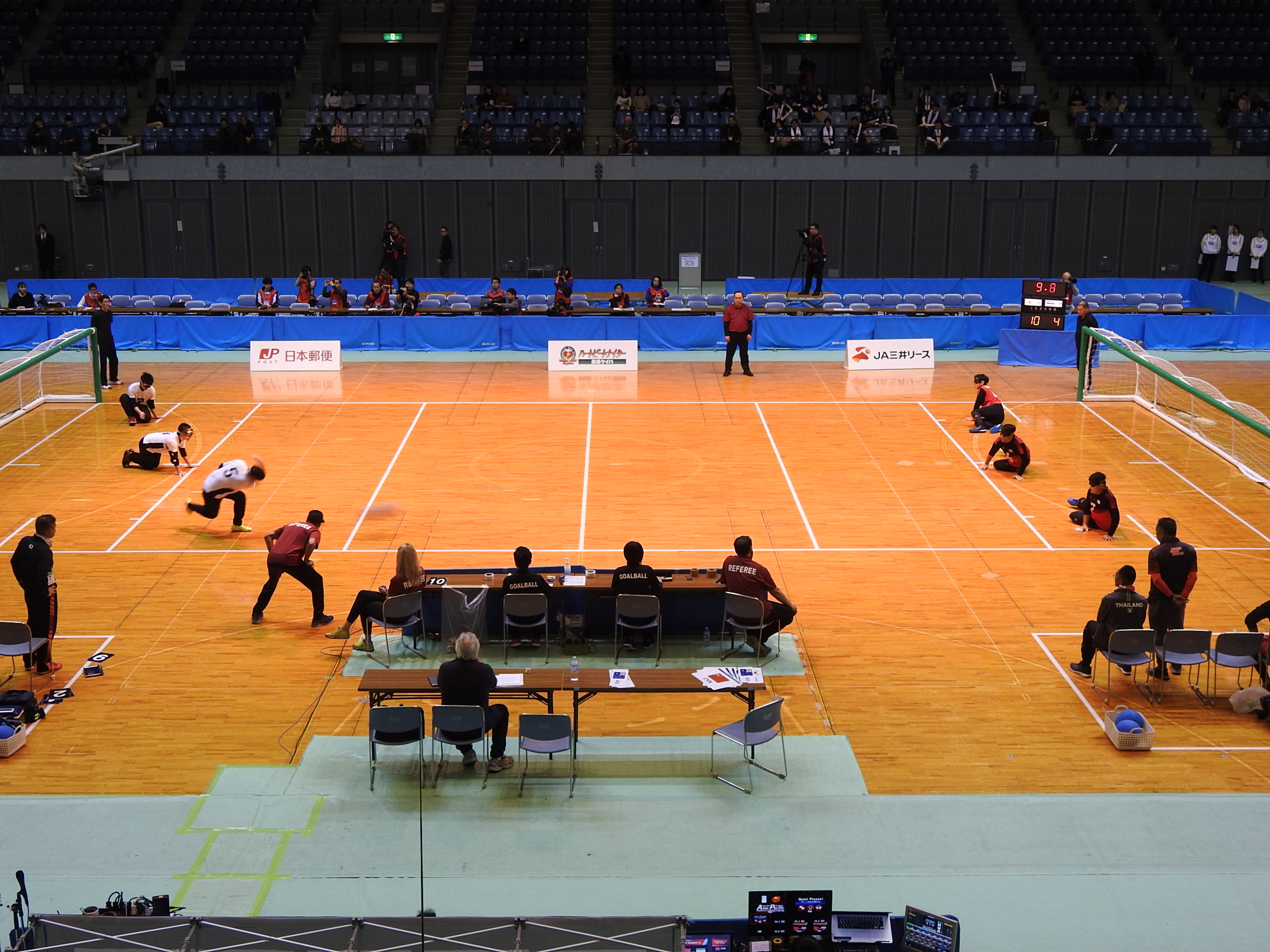
Japan men throwing towards Thailand (2019).

=== 2019 Chiba ===
The 2019 IBSA Goalball Asia-Pacific Regional Championships was from Thursday 5 to Tuesday 10 December 2019, in the Chiba Port Arena, Chiba, Japan. There were seven men's and six women's teams.

There were seven men's teams: Australia, China, Indonesia, Iran, Japan, South Korea, Thailand. China came first, Iran second, and Japan third.

There were six women's teams: Australia, China, Indonesia, Japan, South Korea, Thailand. Japan came first, China second, and South Korea third.

=== 2022 Bahrain ===
Due to the COVID-19 pandemic, the 2021 IBSA Goalball Asia-Pacific Regional Championships were moved from November 2021 to 21 March 2022 in Asan, South Korea. The championships was finally held at the Bahrain Sports Federation for Disabilities Sports Centre, in Riffa, Bahrain from Monday 25 July 2022 to Friday 29 July 2022. The top two teams of each division were eligible for the World Championships in December 2022.

There were five men's teams: Australia, Iran, Japan, South Korea, and Thailand. Japan came first, Iran second, and South Korea third.

There were four women's teams: Australia, Iran, South Korea, and Thailand. South Korea came first, Australia second, and Iran third.

=== 2023 Hangzhou ===
The 2023 IBSA Asia-Pacific Goalball Regional Championships was from 8 to 12 November 2023, in the China National Goalball Training Centre, Hangzhou, China.

There were eight men's teams: Australia, China, Iran, Kazakhstan, South Korea, Mongolia, Pakistan, and Thailand. Iran came first, South Korea second, and China third.

There were five women's teams: Australia, China, Japan, South Korea, and Thailand. China came first, Japan second, and South Korea third.

=== 2025 Islamabad ===
The 2025 IBSA Asia-Pacific Goalball Regional Championships was from 13 to 22 October 2025, in the Liaquat Gymnasium, Pakistan Sports Complex, Islamabad, Pakistan. The first and second place winners of each division gets berths at the 2026 World Championships in China.

The eight men's teams are in two groups:

- Group A along with Australia, Iran, Iraq, Saudi Arabia, and Thailand.
- Group B consists of China, Kazakhstan, Pakistan, South Korea, and Uzbekistan.

The six women's teams are in one pool: China, Japan, Kazakhstan, Pakistan, South Korea, and Thailand.

Final rankings were (men) Iran first, China second, Thailand third, Australia fourth, and (women) China first, Japan second, South Korea third, and Thailand fourth.

== Ranking ==
=== Men ===
1. 2013: Iran,Japan,China
2. 2015: China,Iran,South Korea
3. 2017: China,Iran,Japan
4. 2019: China,Iran,Japan
5. 2021: Japan,Iran,South Korea
6. 2023: Iran,South Korea,China
7. 2025: Iran,China,Thailand

=== Women ===
1. 2013: China,Japan,Iran
2. 2015: Japan,China,Australia
3. 2017: Japan,China,Australia
4. 2019: Japan,China,South Korea
5. 2021: South Korea,Australia,Iran
6. 2023: China,Japan,South Korea
7. 2025: China,Japan,South Korea

== Medals ==
=== Men (2013–2025) ===
Rank	Nation	Gold	Silver	Bronze	Total
1	Iran (IRI)	3	4	0	7
2	China (CHN)	3	1	2	6
3	Japan (JPN)	1	1	2	4
4	South Korea (KOR)	0	1	2	3
5	Thailand (THA)	0	0	1	1
Totals (5 entries)		7	7	7	21

=== Women (2013–2025) ===
Rank	Nation	Gold	Silver	Bronze	Total
1	China (CHN)	3	3	0	6
1	Japan (JPN)	3	3	0	6
3	South Korea (KOR)	1	0	3	4
4	Australia (AUS)	0	1	2	3
5	Iran (IRI)	0	0	2	2
Totals (5 entries)		7	7	7	21

=== Total (2013–2025) ===
Rank	Nation	Gold	Silver	Bronze	Total
1	China (CHN)	6	4	2	12
2	Japan (JPN)	4	4	2	10
3	Iran (IRI)	3	4	2	9
4	South Korea (KOR)	1	1	5	7
5	Australia (AUS)	0	1	2	3
6	Thailand (THA)	0	0	1	1
Totals (6 entries)		14	14	14	42

== See also ==
- Goalball at the Asian Para Games
- Goalball World Championships
- Goalball at the Summer Paralympics
