= Goalball at the Asian Para Games =

- Current season, competition or edition: Goalball at the 2022 Asian Para Games
- Sport: Goalball
- First season: 2010
- Continent: Asia
- Most recent champions: M: China (2nd title); W: China (3rd title)
- Most titles: M: Iran / China (2 titles each); W: China (3 titles)

Goalball has been held at the Asian Para Games since the 2010 edition.

== Medals (2010–2022) ==
=== Total ===
| Rank | Nation | Gold | Silver | Bronze | Total |
|---|---|---|---|---|---|
| 1 | China | 5 | 3 | 0 | 8 |
| 2 | Iran | 2 | 1 | 4 | 7 |
| 3 | Japan | 1 | 3 | 2 | 6 |
| 4 | South Korea | 0 | 1 | 2 | 3 |
| Totals (4 entries) | | 8 | 8 | 8 | 24 |

=== Men ===
| Rank | Nation | Gold | Silver | Bronze | Total |
|---|---|---|---|---|---|
| 1 | China | 2 | 2 | 0 | 4 |
| 2 | Iran | 2 | 0 | 2 | 4 |
| 3 | Japan | 0 | 1 | 1 | 2 |
| 3 | South Korea | 0 | 1 | 1 | 2 |
| Totals (4 entries) | | 4 | 4 | 4 | 12 |

=== Women ===
| Rank | Nation | Gold | Silver | Bronze | Total |
|---|---|---|---|---|---|
| 1 | China | 3 | 1 | 0 | 4 |
| 2 | Japan | 1 | 2 | 1 | 4 |
| 3 | Iran | 0 | 1 | 2 | 3 |
| 4 | South Korea | 0 | 0 | 1 | 1 |
| Totals (4 entries) | | 4 | 4 | 4 | 12 |

== Results ==
=== Men ===
| Games | Gold | Silver | Bronze |
|---|---|---|---|
| 2010 Guangzhou | China | South Korea | Iran |
| 2014 Incheon | Iran | China | Japan |
| 2018 Jakarta | Iran | China | South Korea |
| 2022 Hangzhou | China | Japan | Iran |

=== Women ===
| Games | Gold | Silver | Bronze |
|---|---|---|---|
| 2010 Guangzhou | China | Japan | Iran |
| 2014 Incheon | China | Iran | Japan |
| 2018 Jakarta | Japan | China | Iran |
| 2022 Hangzhou | China | Japan | South Korea |

== Summary (2010-2022) ==
=== Men ===
| Rank | Team | Part | M | W | D | L | GF | GA | GD | Points |
|---|---|---|---|---|---|---|---|---|---|---|
| 1 | China | 4 | 20 | 18 | 0 | 2 | 208 | 87 | +121 | 54 |
| 2 | Iran | 4 | 21 | 16 | 1 | 4 | 191 | 101 | +90 | 49 |
| 3 | South Korea | 4 | 21 | 12 | 0 | 9 | 184 | 142 | +42 | 36 |
| 4 | Japan | 4 | 20 | 11 | 1 | 8 | 146 | 124 | +22 | 34 |
| 5 | Iraq | 4 | 14 | 5 | 0 | 9 | 103 | 115 | −12 | 15 |
| 6 | Jordan | 3 | 11 | 4 | 0 | 7 | 57 | 96 | −39 | 12 |
| 7 | Thailand | 2 | 6 | 2 | 0 | 4 | 39 | 66 | −27 | 6 |
| 8 | Qatar | 3 | 10 | 1 | 0 | 9 | 40 | 102 | −62 | 3 |
| 9 | Malaysia | 1 | 3 | 0 | 0 | 3 | 19 | 37 | −18 | 0 |
| 10 | Saudi Arabia | 1 | 4 | 0 | 0 | 4 | 24 | 46 | −22 | 0 |
| 11 | Indonesia | 1 | 3 | 0 | 0 | 3 | 21 | 46 | −25 | 0 |
| 12 | Mongolia | 1 | 3 | 0 | 0 | 3 | 2 | 32 | −30 | 0 |
| 13 | Pakistan | 1 | 4 | 0 | 0 | 4 | 4 | 44 | −40 | 0 |

=== Women ===
| Rank | Team | Part | M | W | D | L | GF | GA | GD | Points |
|---|---|---|---|---|---|---|---|---|---|---|
| 1 | China | 4 | 21 | 19 | 0 | 2 | 172 | 37 | +135 | 57 |
| 2 | Japan | 4 | 21 | 15 | 1 | 5 | 102 | 32 | +70 | 46 |
| 3 | Iran | 4 | 19 | 8 | 1 | 10 | 91 | 92 | −1 | 25 |
| 4 | South Korea | 3 | 14 | 5 | 1 | 8 | 42 | 66 | -24 | 16 |
| 5 | Thailand | 3 | 17 | 3 | 1 | 13 | 45 | 124 | -79 | 10 |
| 6 | Indonesia | 1 | 5 | 1 | 0 | 4 | 6 | 44 | −38 | 3 |
| 7 | Laos | 2 | 9 | 0 | 0 | 9 | 11 | 74 | −63 | 0 |

== Medalists ==
2010-2018:

2022:

== See also ==
- Asia Goalball Championships
