= United States national team =

The United States national team or Team USA may refer to any of a number of sports team representing the United States in international competitions.

== Olympic teams ==
Additionally, these teams may compete in other international competitions such as the FIBA Basketball World Cup and World Championship for Women, the Ice Hockey World Championships, the FIFA World Cup, or the World Figure Skating Championships. Teams that represent the United States at the Olympic Games include:

- United States national badminton team
- United States national baseball team
- United States men's national basketball team
- United States women's national basketball team
- United States men's national 3x3 basketball team
- United States women's national 3x3 basketball team
- United States men's national cycling team
- United States Equestrian Team
- United States men's national field hockey team
- United States women's national field hockey team
- United States national figure skating team
- United States men's national gymnastics team
- United States women's national gymnastics team
- United States men's national handball team
- United States women's national handball team
- United States men's national ice hockey team
- United States women's national ice hockey team
- United States national skateboarding team
- United States Ski Team
- United States men's national under-23 soccer team
- United States women's national soccer team
- United States women's national softball team
- United States national swim team
- United States national track and field team
- United States men's national volleyball team
- United States women's national volleyball team
- United States national beach volleyball team
- United States men's national water polo team
- United States women's national water polo team

== Paralympic teams ==
Additionally, these teams may compete in other international competitions such as the IWRF World Championship, or the Ice Sledge Hockey World Championships. Teams that represent the United States at the Paralympic Games include:

- United States national wheelchair rugby team
- United States men's national wheelchair basketball team
- United States women's national wheelchair basketball team
- United States men's national goalball team
- United States women's national goalball team
- United States men's national wheelchair volleyball team
- United States women's national wheelchair volleyball team
- United States men's national ice sledge hockey team
- United States men's national floorball team
- United States women's national floorball team
- United States men's Paralympic soccer team
- United States Para Powerlifting team

== Other international competitions ==
- "Team USA" or "Team United States" is the official designation of the team representing the United States in several international golf competitions:
  - Ryder Cup, a professional men's event pitting Team USA against Team Europe
  - Presidents Cup, a professional men's event pitting Team United States against Team International, made up of non-Europeans
  - Solheim Cup, the women's analog to the Ryder Cup, also pitting Team USA against Team Europe
  - Walker Cup, an amateur men's event pitting Team USA against Team Great Britain & Ireland
  - Curtis Cup, the women's analog to the Walker Cup, also pitting Team USA against Team Great Britain & Ireland
- A1 Team USA in the A1 Grand Prix, an international formula racing competition
- United States national American football team
- United States women's national American football team
- United States national junior American football team
- United States men's national Australian rules football team
- United States women's national Australian rules football team
- United States men's national ball hockey team
- United States women's national ball hockey team
- United States national bandy team in the Bandy World Championship
- United States women's national bandy team in the Women's Bandy World Championship
- United States women's national baseball team
- United States national under-18 baseball team
- United States men's national under-19 basketball team
- United States women's national under-19 basketball team
- United States men's national under-17 basketball team
- United States women's national under-17 basketball team
- United States national cricket team
- United States women's national cricket team
- United States national under-19 cricket team
- United States men's national flag football team
- United States women's national flag football team
- United States men's national floorball team
- United States women's national floorball team
- United States men's national under-19 floorball team
- United States women's junior national goalball team
- United States national beach handball team
- United States women's national beach handball team
- United States men's national junior ice hockey team
- United States women's national under-18 ice hockey team
- United States men's national under-16 ice hockey team
- United States women's national ice sledge hockey team
- United States men's national inline hockey team
- United States women's national inline hockey team
- United States national kabaddi team
- United States national korfball team
- United States men's national lacrosse team
- United States women's national lacrosse team
- United States national indoor lacrosse team
- United States national netball team
- United States national quidditch team
- USA Roller Derby
- United States national roller hockey team
- United States national rugby league team
- United States women's national rugby league team
- United States national rugby union team
- United States women's national rugby union team
- United States national under-20 rugby union team
- United States national under-19 rugby union team
- United States national rugby sevens team
- United States women's national rugby sevens team
- United States men's national soccer team
- United States women's national under-23 soccer team
- United States men's national under-21 soccer team
- United States men's national under-20 soccer team
- United States women's national under-20 soccer team
- United States women's national under-19 soccer team
- United States men's national under-18 soccer team
- United States women's national under-18 soccer team
- United States men's national under-17 soccer team
- United States women's national under-17 soccer team
- United States boys' national under-15 soccer team
- United States national arena soccer team
- United States men's national beach soccer team
- United States men's national softball team
- United States men's junior national softball team
- United States women's junior national softball team
- United States men's national squash team
- United States women's national squash team
- United States synchronized skating teams
- United States national futsal team
- United States women's national futsal team
- United States national speedway team in the Speedway World Cup
- United States Davis Cup team
- United States Fed Cup team
- United States men's national under-23 volleyball team
- United States women's national under-23 volleyball team
- United States men's national under-21 volleyball team
- United States women's national under-20 volleyball team
- United States men's national under-19 volleyball team
- United States women's national under-18 volleyball team
- Team USA (wrestling) in the TNA X Cup Tournaments

== See also ==
- Category:National sports teams of the United States
- Team America (disambiguation)
