= Goalball at the 1976 Summer Paralympics =

Goalball at the V Paralympic Games
- Paralympic Goalball
- Venue: Centennial Park Olympium

Goalball at the 1976 Summer Paralympics consisted of a men's team event. The competition was held at the Centennial Park Olympium in Toronto, Ontario, Canada.

== Medal summary ==
Event	Gold	Silver	Bronze
Men	Austria	West Germany; A. Annasens; W. Helmich; W. Klein; F. Maschmann; K. Mikuszak	Denmark

== Competition ==
=== Results ===
Quarterfinals
Canada	1
Denmark	3
United States	1
West Germany	9
Bye
Austria
Israel	0
Belgium	4

Semifinals
Denmark	1
West Germany	2
Austria	3
Belgium	1

Finals
Austria	4
West Germany	2
Third place
Denmark	3
Belgium	2
