= Canada women's junior national goalball team =

Canadian youth team of a Paralympic sport

Canada women's junior national goalball team is the women's junior national team of Canada. Goalball is a team sport designed specifically for athletes with a vision impairment. The team takes part in international competitions.

== IBSA World Youth and Student Games ==
=== 2007 USA ===
The 2007 IBSA World Youth and Student Games were held in the United States. The team was one of four teams participating, with the United States finishing first, Germany second, Russia third and Canada fourth.

=== 2009 Colorado Springs ===
The 2009 IBSA World Youth and Student Championships were held in Colorado Springs, Colorado, United States of America. Canada fielded a youth team of:

Ashlie Andrews (Penticton, BC)
Tiana Knight (Calgary, AB)
Stephannie Leach (London, ON)
Angel Lu-Lebel (Vancouver, BC)
Cassie Orgeles (St. Catherines, ON)
Tanya Peterson (Calgary, AB)

Carol Braul, head coach (Calgary, AB)
Cherie Lu, assistant coach (Vancouver, BC)

=== 2011 Colorado Springs ===
In 2011, the IBSA World Youth and Student Championships were held in Colorado Springs, Colorado, United States of America. Canada fielded a youth girls team of:

Ashlie Andrews (Penticton, BC)
Sophie Audet (Montréal, QC)
Sarah Hargraves (Brantford, ON)
Rima Kaddoura (Calgary, AB)
Tiana Knight (Calgary, AB)
Jillian MacSween (Brantford, ON / Halifax, NS)

Janice Dawson, high performance head coach (Calgary, AB)
Natalie Scott, assistant coach (Saskatoon, SK)
Mercedes Louro, physiotherapist (Calgary, AB)

== Competitive history ==
The table below contains individual game results for the team in international matches and competitions.

Year	Event	Opponent	Date	Venue	Team	Team	Winner	Ref
2007	IBSA World Youth and Student Games	United States	14 July	United States – Main Gym	11	1	United States	
2007	IBSA World Youth and Student Games	Russia	14 July	United States – Main Gym	13	7	Russia	
