= Austria women's national goalball team =

Austrian national team, for the Paralympic sport of goalball

Austria women's national goalball team is the women's national team of Austria. Goalball is a team sport designed specifically for athletes with a vision impairment. The team takes part in international competitions.

== World Championships ==
IBSA World Goalball Championships have been held every four years from 1978.

The 1982 World Championships were held at Butler University in Indianapolis, Indiana. The team was one of six teams participating, and they finished fifth overall.

== See also ==
- Disabled sports
- Austria men's national goalball team
- Austria at the Paralympics
- IBSA Europe Goalball Championships
