= Team America =

Team America may refer to:

- Team America: World Police, a 2004 movie created by Trey Parker and Matt Stone
- Team America (NASL), a short-lived soccer team in the North American Soccer League for the 1983 season
- Team America, a Marvel Comics superhero team, later known as the Thunderiders
- Team America PAC, a political action committee; founded by Congressman Tom Tancredo of Colorado
- Team America Rocketry Challenge (TARC), an American model rocketry competition for high school students

== See also ==
- Team USA (disambiguation)
