= Thailand women's national goalball team =

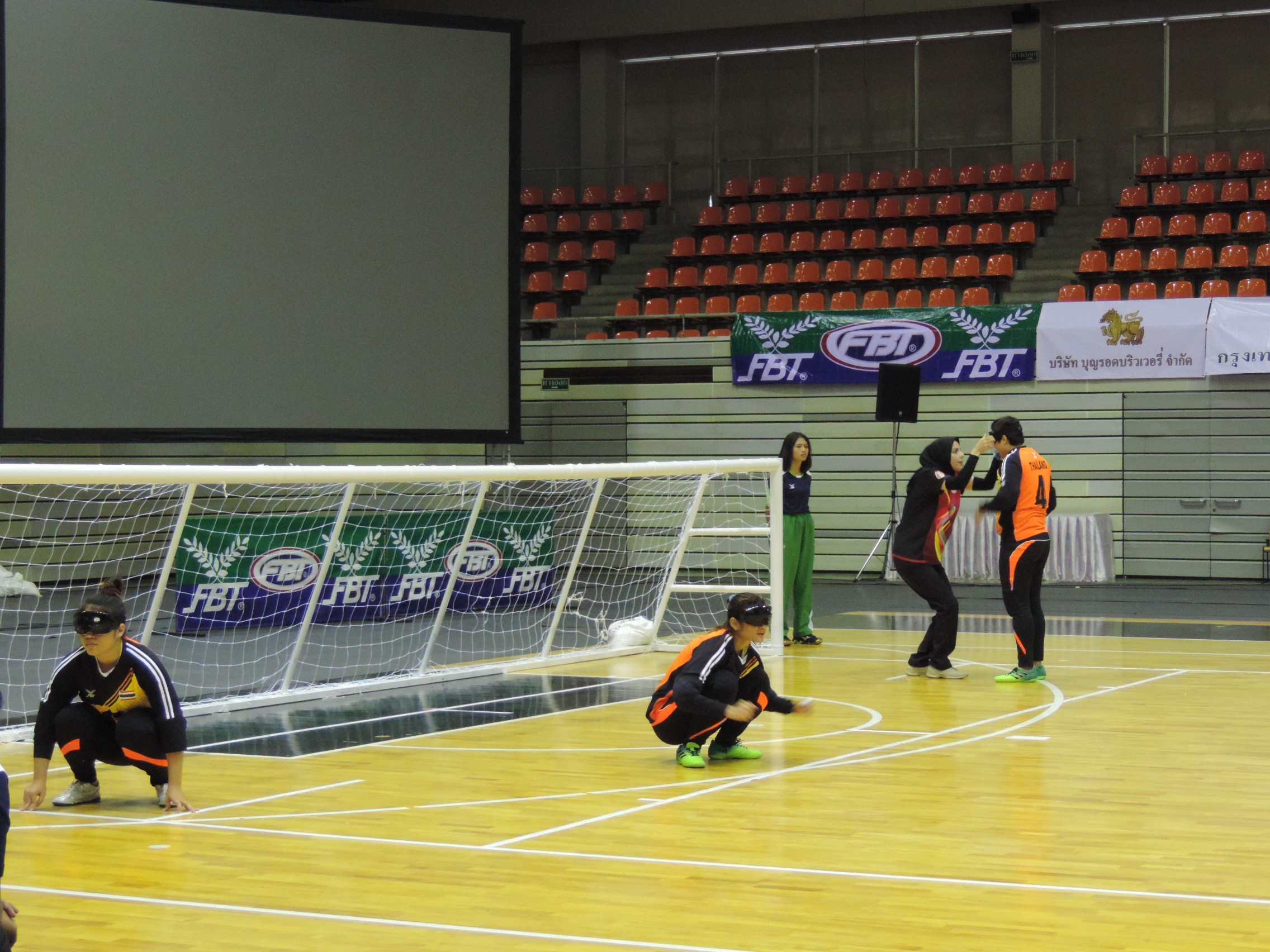
- Thailand women's goalball team. Goalball at the IBSA Asia regional championships, Din Daeng, Bangkok, Thailand (Aug 2017).
- Sport: Goalball
- League: IBSA
- Division: Women
- Region: IBSA Asia
- Location: Bangkok
- Colours: Yellow, orange
- CEO: Tim Suphankomut
- Championships: Paralympic Games medals: : 0: 0: 0 World Championship medals: : 0: 0: 0

Thailand women's national goalball team is the women's national team of Thailand. Goalball is a team sport designed specifically for athletes with a vision impairment. The team takes part in international competitions.

== Regional championships ==
The team competed in IBSA Asia goalball region, and from January 2010 became part of the IBSA Asia-Pacific goalball competition region.

=== 2015 Hangzhou ===
The team competed in the 2015 IBSA Asia Pacific Goalball Regional Championships, from 8 to 12 November 2015, in the China National Goalball Training Centre, Hangzhou, China. There were five women's teams: Australia, China, Japan, Mongolia, Thailand.

The team came fourth, ahead of Mongolia.

=== 2017 Bangkok ===
The team competed in the 2017 IBSA Asia/Pacific Goalball Regional Championships, from Monday 21 to Saturday 26 August 2017, in the Thai-Japan Sports Stadium, Din Daeng, Bangkok, Thailand. There were six women's teams: Australia, China, Iran, Japan, South Korea, Thailand. Team athletes were Chalita Eiamnuch (#3), Yada Jaengsawang (#4), Ornpreeya Mongkolsittichai (#5), Thatnaret Pasoedphan (#1), Phitchaya Srathongta (#2), and Kamonnath Srihachan (#6).

The team lost all five games to the others in the women's division.

=== 2019 Chiba ===
The team competed in the 2019 IBSA Goalball Asia-Pacific Regional Championships, from Thursday 5 to Tuesday 10 December 2019, in the Chiba Port Arena, Chiba, Japan. There were seven men's and six women's teams. There were six women's teams: Australia, China, Indonesia, Japan, South Korea, Thailand. Team athletes were Ratchaniphon Thongsing (#2), Parichanan Nunjuy (#5), Supattra Shangshueng (#6), Punyaporn Yotchatr (#7), Phitchaya Srathongta (#8), and Yada Jaengsawang (#9).

The team was mercied 13:3 by China, losing 4:11 to Japan and 10:16 to Iran, drew with South Korea and Indonesia, and beating Australia 6:4. The team came fifth overall, ahead of Indonesia.

=== 2022 Bahrain ===
Due to the COVID-19 pandemic, the 2021 IBSA Goalball Asia-Pacific Regional Championships were moved from November 2021 to 21 March 2022 in Asan, South Korea. The championships was finally held at the Bahrain Sports Federation for Disabilities Sports Centre, in Riffa, Bahrain from Monday 25 July 2022 to Friday 29 July 2022. The top two teams of each division were eligible for the World Championships in December 2022.

There were four women's teams: Australia, Iran, South Korea, Thailand. They placed last in the round-robin, and fourth overall.

== ASEAN Para Games ==
=== 2015 Singapore ===
The team competed at the 8th and 2015 ASEAN Para Games, with competition from Friday 4 to Wednesday 9 December 2015, at Marina Bay Sands, Singapore. There were four men's teams (Indonesia, Laos, Malaysia, Thailand) and three women's teams (Laos, Myanmar, Thailand). Team athletes were: Chalita Eiamnuch, Yada Jaengsawang, Ornpreeya Mongkolsittichai, Thatnaret Pasoedphan, Sutasinee Potita, and Phitchaya Srathongta.

The team came first, ahead of Laos and Myanmar.

=== 2017 Kuala Lumpur ===
The team competed at the 9th and 2017 ASEAN Para Games, with competition from Sunday 17 to Saturday 23 September 2017, at Kuala Lumpur, Malaysia. There were at least three men's teams (Laos, Malaysia, Thailand) and three women's teams (Laos, Malaysia, Thailand). Team athletes were Chalita Eiamnuch, Yada Jaengsawang, Ornpreeya Mongkolsittichai, Thatnaret Pasoedphan, Phitchaya Srathongta, and Kamonnath Srihachan.

The team won gold with a 5:0 win over Laos.

== Asian Para Games ==
=== 2018 Jakarta ===
The team competed at the 2018 Asian Para Games, competing from Sunday 7 to Friday 12 October 2018, at the Balai Kartini hall, Setiabudi, South Jakarta, Indonesia, under the auspices of the Asian Paralympic Committee. There were eight men's teams (China, Indonesia, Iran, Iraq, Japan, Qatar, South Korea, Thailand) and six women's teams (China, Indonesia, Iran, Japan, Laos, Thailand).

The team placed fourth, ahead of Laos and Indonesia.

== See also ==
- Parasports
- Thailand men's national goalball team
- Thailand at the Paralympics
