= Thailand men's national goalball team =

Thai national team, for the Paralympic sport of goalball

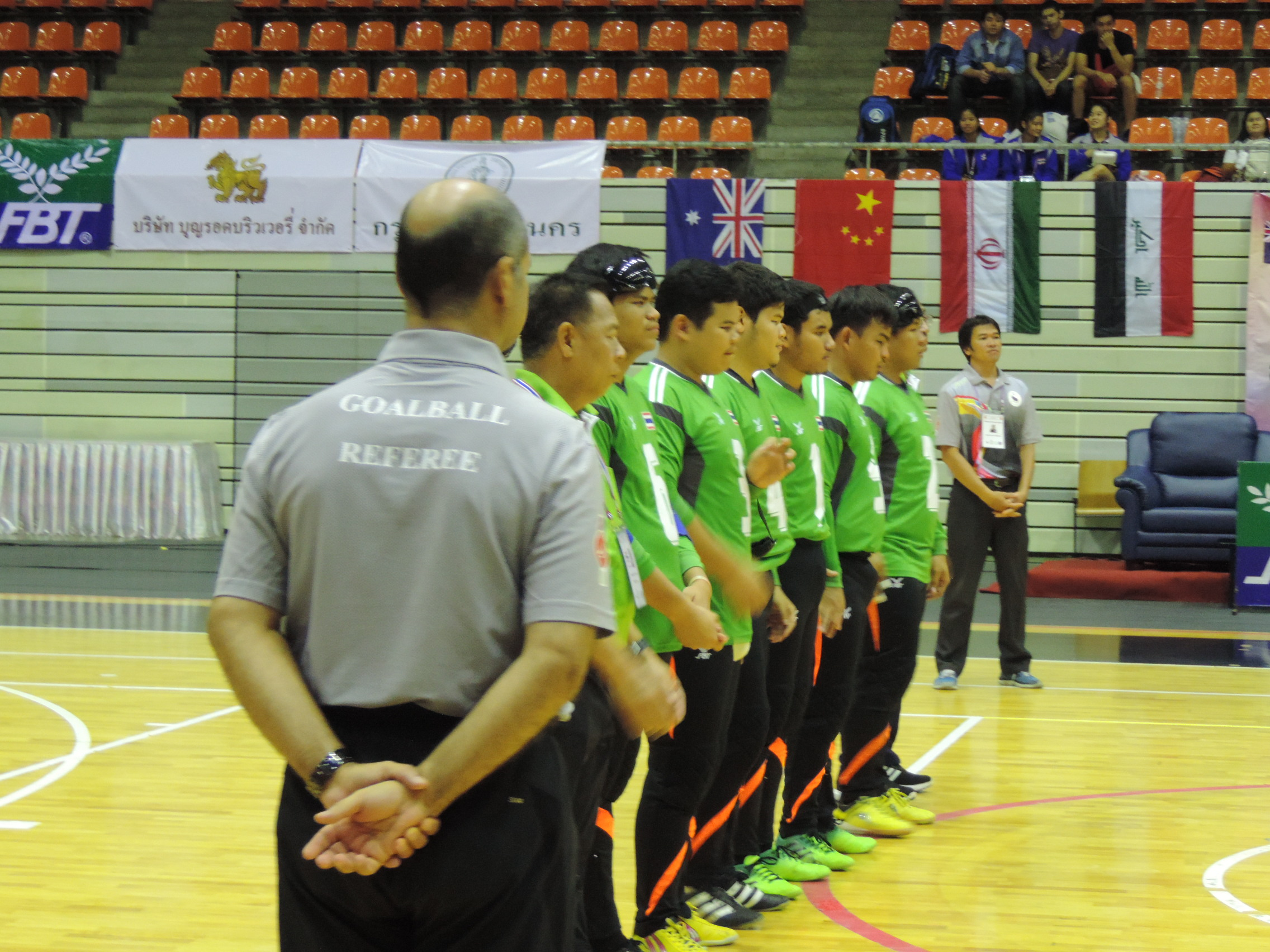
- Thailand men's goalball team. Goalball at the IBSA Asia regional championships, Din Daeng, Bangkok, Thailand (Aug 2017).
- Sport: Goalball
- League: IBSA
- Division: Men
- Region: IBSA Asia
- Location: Bangkok
- Colours: Yellow, orange, green
- CEO: Tim Suphankomut
- Championships: Paralympic Games medals: : 0: 0: 0 World Championship medals: : 0: 0: 0

Thailand men's national goalball team is the men's national team of Thailand. Goalball is a team sport designed specifically for athletes with a vision impairment. The team takes part in international competitions.

== IBSA World Games ==
=== 2003 Quebec City ===
The team competed in the 2003 IBSA World Games from Friday 1 to Sunday 10 August 2011, in Quebec City, Canada. Ten teams competed. Drawing Pool B with five other teams, the team was defeated by Canada 10:0, South Korea 12:2, Slovakia 6:4, and Croatia 10:2. The team however beat Russia 13:5.

=== 2011 Antalya ===
The team competed in the 2011 IBSA World Games from 1 to 10 April 2011, in Antalya, Turkey, organised by the Turkish Blind Sports Federation. There were fifteen men's and fourteen women's teams. They placed seventh of eight teams in Group B, losing six of seven games, and were thirteenth in the final standings.

== Regional championships ==
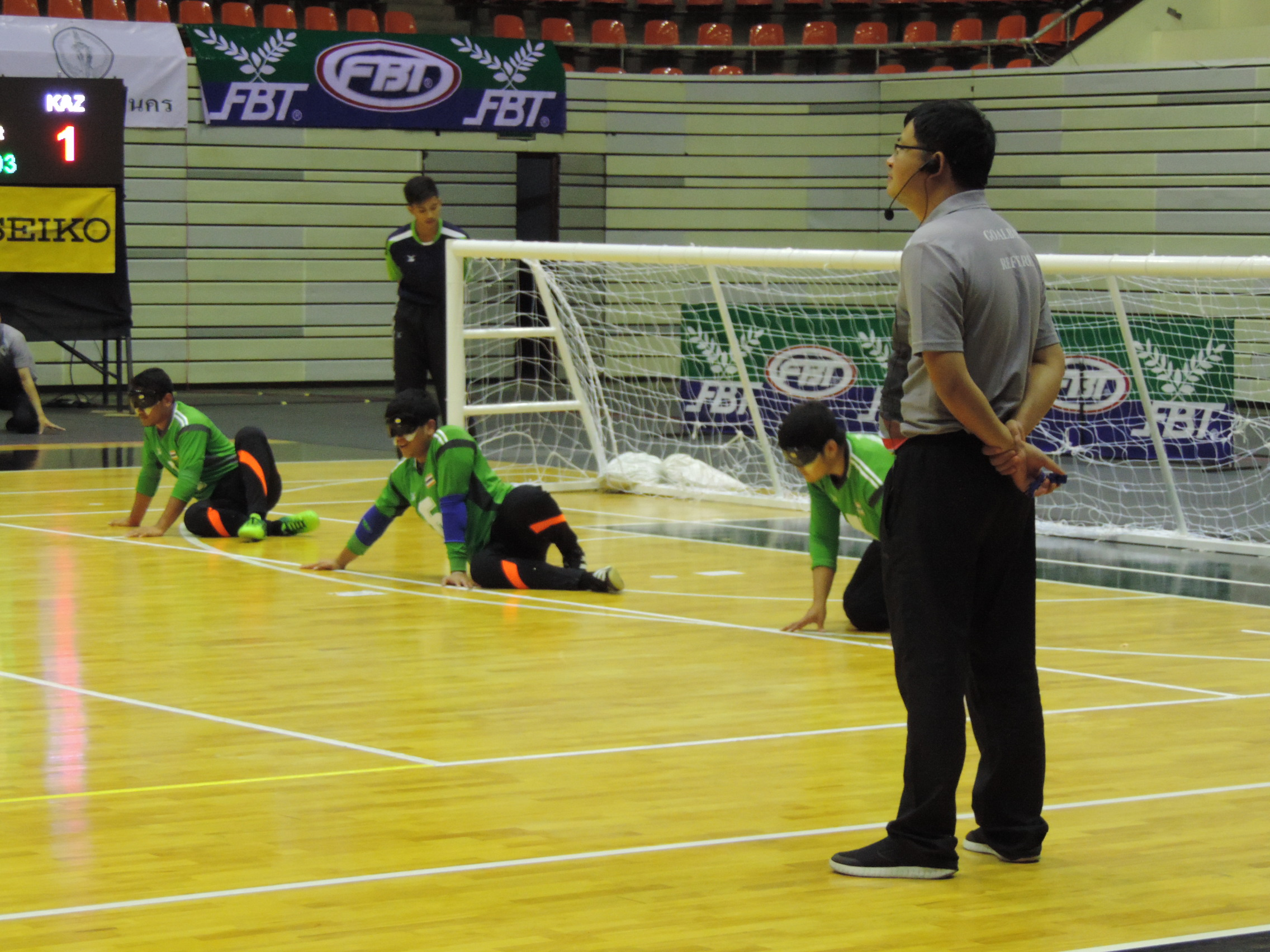
Thailand men's goalball team. Goalball at the IBSA Asia regional championships, Din Daeng, Bangkok, Thailand (Aug 2017).

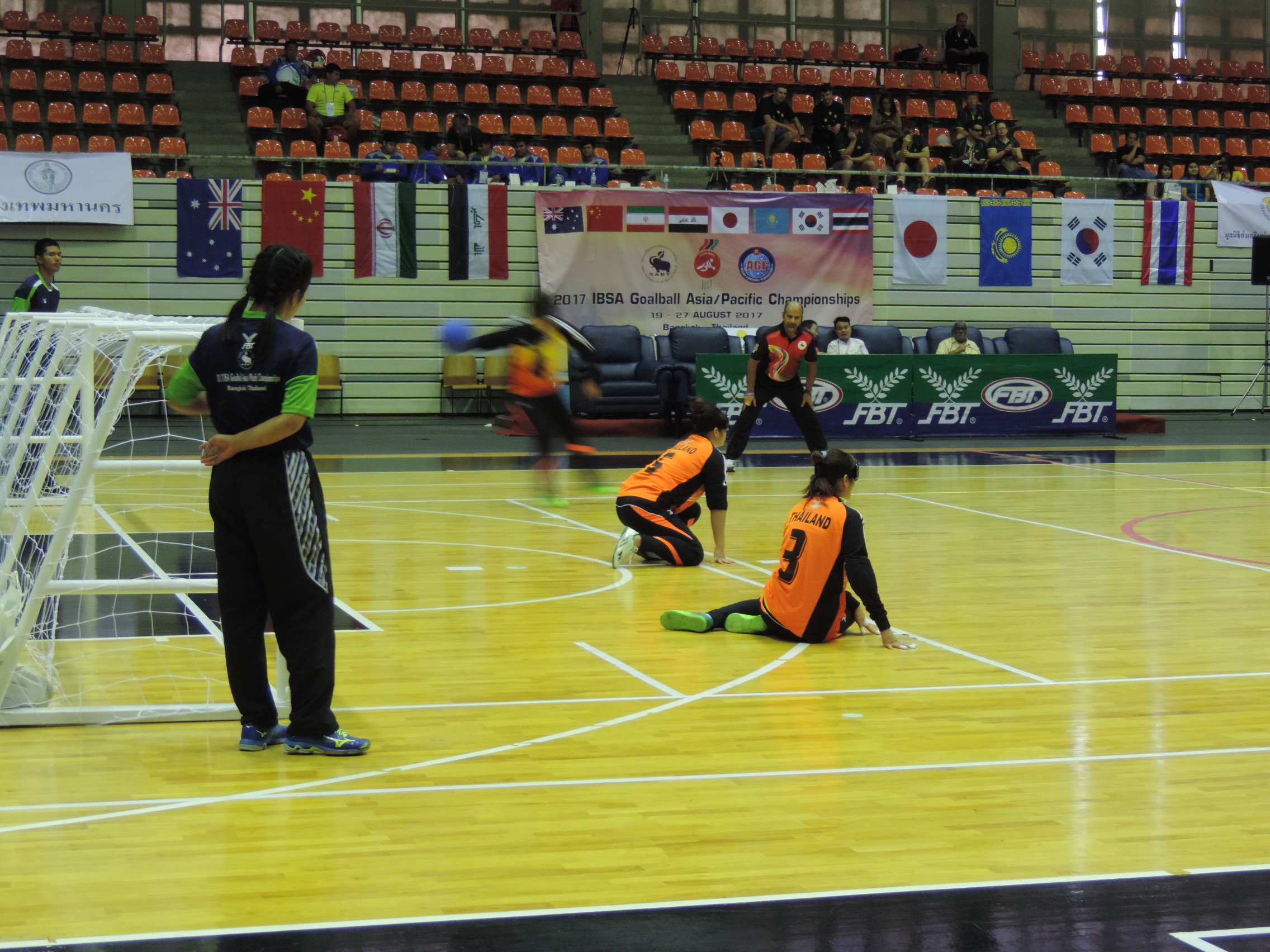
Thailand men's goalball team. Goalball at the IBSA Asia regional championships, Din Daeng, Bangkok, Thailand (Aug 2017).

The team competed in IBSA Asia goalball region, and from January 2010 became part of the IBSA Asia-Pacific goalball competition region.

=== 2013 Beijing ===
The team competed in the 2013 IBSA Asia Pacific Goalball Regional Championships, from 11 to 16 November 2013, in Beijing, China. Of the six men's teams (Australia, China, Iran, Japan, Mongolia, Thailand), they lost four of their five games, staying ahead of Mongolia.

=== 2017 Bangkok ===
The team competed in the 2017 IBSA Asia/Pacific Goalball Regional Championships, from Monday 21 to Saturday 26 August 2017, in the Thai-Japan Sports Stadium, Din Daeng, Bangkok, Thailand. There were seven men's and five women's teams. The team included Siwarin Phonphirun #5, Noppadon Poosrisom #3, Chonlathi Sukchum #1, Danuporn Suksom #1, Kitsada Thanyawanitphong #8, and Tanapong Wangthongjitr #9.

In Pool B with Iran, South Korea, and Kazakhstan, the team lost two of its three games.

=== 2019 Chiba ===
The team competed in the 2019 IBSA Goalball Asia-Pacific Regional Championships, from Thursday 5 to Tuesday 10 December 2019, in the Chiba Port Arena, Chiba, Japan. There were seven men's and six women's teams. The team included Pornchai Chadmee #6, Buncha Fankhamai #4, Noppadon Poosrisom #3, Chonlathi Sukchum #1, Kitsada Thanyawanitphong #7, and Tanapong Wangthongjitr #2. Fankhamai was the team's highest goal scorer, followed by Thanyawanitphong .

They placed fifth in the round-robin ahead of Australia and Indonesia, and fifth overall.

=== 2022 Bahrain ===
Due to the COVID-19 pandemic, the 2021 IBSA Goalball Asia-Pacific Regional Championships were moved from November 2021 to 21 March 2022 in Asan, South Korea. The championships was finally held at the Bahrain Sports Federation for Disabilities Sports Centre, in Riffa, Bahrain from Monday 25 July 2022 to Friday 29 July 2022. The top two teams of each division were eligible for the World Championships in December 2022.

There were five men's teams: Australia, Iran, Japan, South Korea, Thailand. The team was mercied three times in the round-robin, and in the semi-finals against Japan; but in the bronze medal play-off with South Korea, they lost 10:11, after proceeding to extra throws, then sudden death extra throws to the third pair. They placed fourth in the round-robin, and fourth overall, ahead of Australia.

Athletes: #1 Thanachot Chameram, #2 Tanapong Wangtrongjitr, #5 Chonlathi Sukchum, #7 Kitsada Thanyawanitphong, #8 Noppadon Poosrisom, #9 Pornchai Chadmee.
Team staff: Coach Suthep Chobchuphol, assistant coach Nakarin Yam-Iam, staff Somchai Yam-Iam.

== ASEAN Para Games ==
=== 2015 Singapore ===
The team competed at the 8th and 2015 ASEAN Para Games, with competition from Friday 4 to Wednesday 9 December 2015, at Marina Bay Sands, Singapore. There were four men's teams (Indonesia, Laos, Malaysia, Thailand) and three women's teams (Laos, Myanmar, Thailand). Team athletes were Pornchai Chadmee, Buncha Fankhamai, Saknarin Khlaisuwan, Siwarin Phonphirun, Noppadon Poosrisom, and Tanapong Wangtrongjitr.

The team won gold, ahead of Malaysia by a mercy of 16:6.

=== 2017 Kuala Lumpur ===
The team competed at the 9th and 2017 ASEAN Para Games, with competition from Sunday 17 to Saturday 23 September 2017, at Kuala Lumpur, Malaysia. There were at least three men's teams (Laos, Malaysia, Thailand) and three women's teams (Laos, Malaysia, Thailand). Team athletes were Siwarin Phonphirun, Nappadon Poosrisom, Chonlathi Sukchum, Danuporn Suksom, Kitsada Thanyawanitphong, and Tanapong Wangthongjitr.

Malaysian men took out the gold medal, from five-time winner Thailand's.

== Asian Para Games ==
=== 2018 Jakarta ===
The team competed at the 2018 Asian Para Games, competing from Sunday 7 to Friday 12 October 2018, at the Balai Kartini hall, Setiabudi, South Jakarta, Indonesia, under the auspices of the Asian Paralympic Committee. There were eight men's teams (China, Indonesia, Iran, Iraq, Japan, Qatar, South Korea, Thailand) and six women's teams (China, Indonesia, Iran, Japan, Laos, Thailand).

The team playing in Pool A came fourth, and did not proceed to the finals.

== Gallery ==
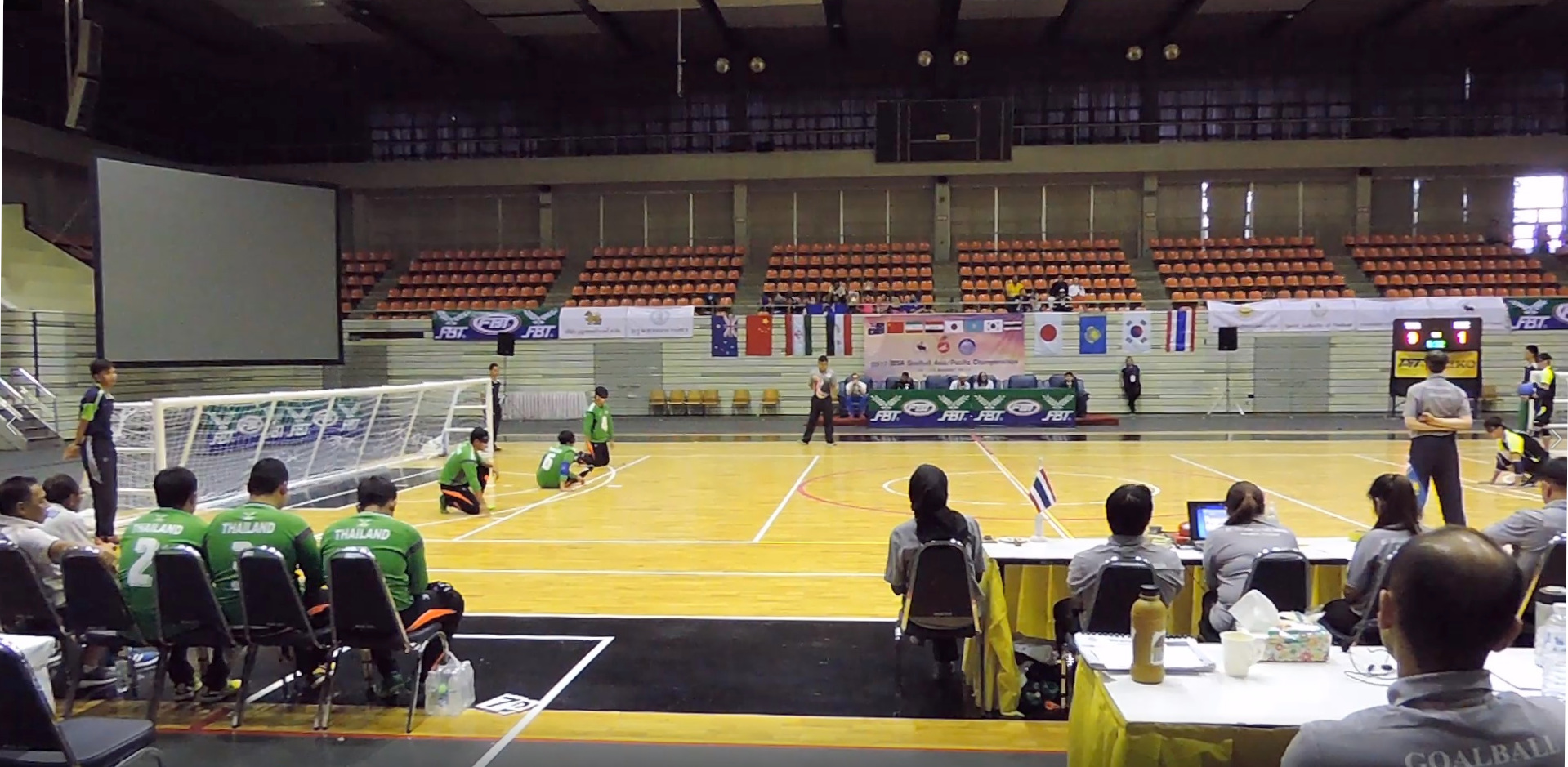
Thailand men's goalball team on the left ready to defend a throw by Kazakhstan. Goalball at the IBSA Asia regional championships, Din Daeng, Bangkok, Thailand (Aug 2017).

== See also ==
- Parasports
- Thailand women's national goalball team
- Thailand at the Paralympics
