= Great Britain women's junior national goalball team =

British youth team of a Paralympic sport

Great Britain women's junior national goalball team is the women's junior national team of Great Britain. Goalball is a team sport designed specifically for athletes with a vision impairment. The team takes part in international competitions.

== Youth world championships ==
The 2005 Junior World Championships were held in Colorado Springs, Colorado. The team was one of three teams participating, and they finished second overall.
