= South Africa women's junior national goalball team =

South Africa women's junior national goalball team is the women's junior national team of South Africa. It takes part in international goalball competitions.

== World championships ==
The 2005 Junior World Championships were held in Colorado Springs, Colorado. The team was one of three teams participating, and they finished third overall.
