= Russia women's junior national goalball team =

Russian youth team of a Paralympic sport

Russia women's junior national goalball team is the women's junior national team of Russia. Goalball is a team sport designed specifically for athletes with a vision impairment. The team takes part in international competitions.

== IBSA World Youth and Student Games ==
The 2007 IBSA World Youth and Student Games were held in the United States. The team was one of four teams participating, with the United States finishing first, Germany second, Russia third and Canada fourth.

== Competitive history ==
The table below contains individual game results for the team in international matches and competitions.

Year	Event	Opponent	Date	Venue	Team	Team	Winner	Ref
2007	IBSA World Youth and Student Games	Germany	14 July	United States – Auxiliary Gym	12	4	Germany	
2007	IBSA World Youth and Student Games	Canada	14 July	United States – Main Gym	13	7	Russia	
