= Germany women's junior national goalball team =

German youth team of a Paralympic sport

Germany women's junior national goalball team is the women's junior national team of Germany. Goalball is a team sport designed specifically for athletes with a vision impairment. The team takes part in international goalball competitions.

== IBSA World Youth and Student Games ==
=== 2007 USA ===
The 2007 IBSA World Youth and Student Games were held in the United States. The team was one of four teams participating, with the United States finishing first, Germany second, Russia third and Canada fourth.

== Competitive history ==
The table below contains individual game results for the team in international matches and competitions.

Year	Event	Opponent	Date	Venue	Team	Team	Winner	Ref
2007	IBSA World Youth and Student Games	Russia	14 July	United States – Auxiliary Gym	12	4	Germany	
2007	IBSA World Youth and Student Games	United States	14 July	United States – Main Gym	3	7	United States	
