= South Korea women's national goalball team =

South Korean national team, for the Paralympic sport of goalball

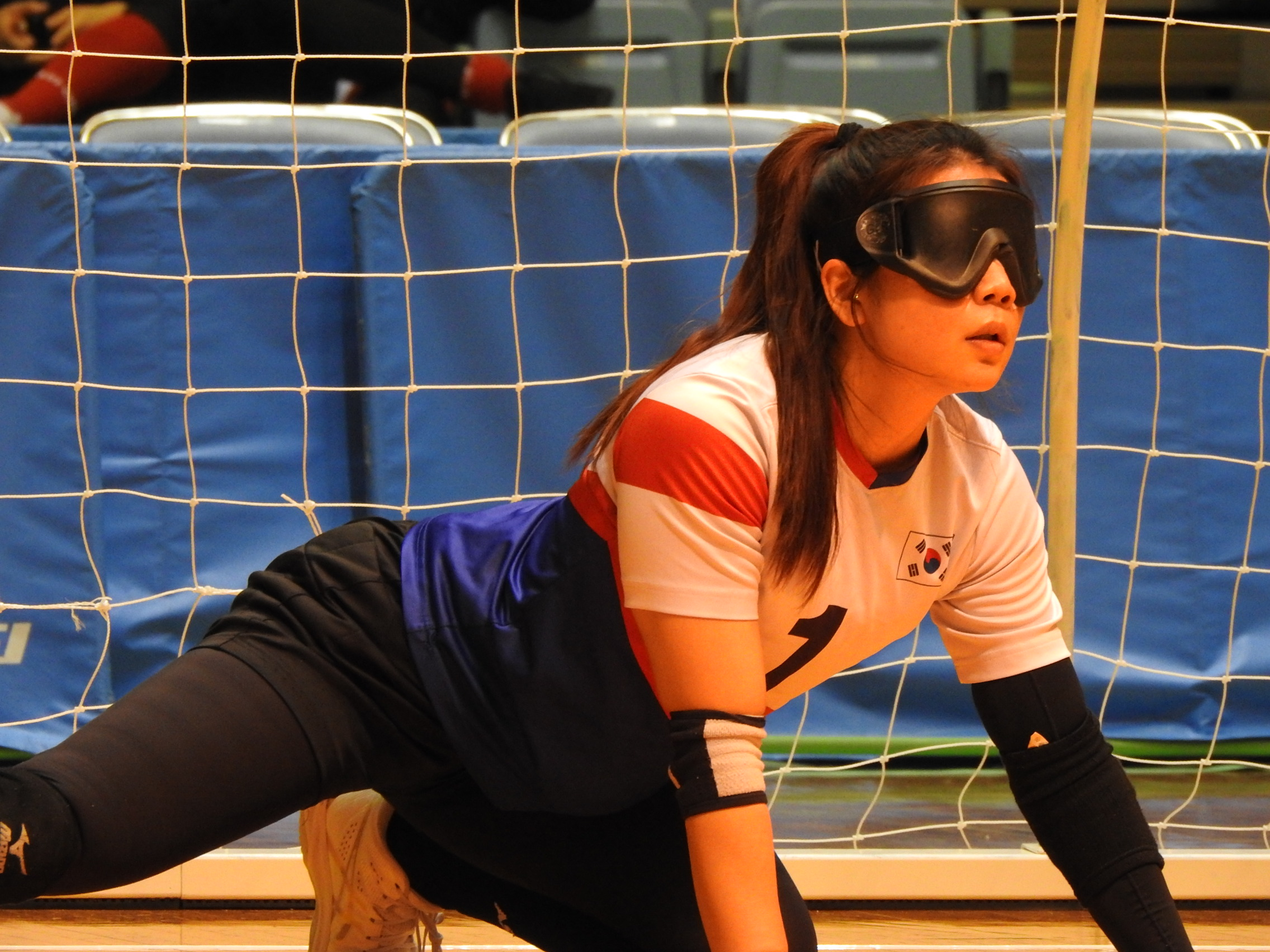
- South Korea women's goalball team #1 Heejin KIM preparing to defend at the IBSA Asia regional championships, Chiba city, Chiba, Japan (December 2019).
- Sport: Goalball
- Founded: 2006
- League: IBSA
- Division: Women
- Region: IBSA Asia
- Location: South Korea
- Colours: Red, white, blue
- Championships: Paralympic Games medals: : 0: 0: 0 World Championship medals: : 0: 1: 0
- Parent group: Korea Blind Goalball Federation (Korean: 대한장애인골볼협회); Korean Paralympic Committee
- Website: kbgf.koreanpc.kr (in Korean)

South Korea women's national goalball team is the women's national team of South Korea. Goalball is a team sport designed specifically for athletes with a vision impairment. It takes part in international competitions.

A goalball-specific national association was formed in February 2006, although the country hosted the Paralympic Games eighteen years before.

== Paralympic Games ==
=== 1988 Seoul ===
As the host nation, the team competed in the 1988 Summer Paralympics, from 15 to 24 October 1988, in Seoul, South Korea. There were fourteen men's and eight women's teams. This was the first time the term "Paralympic" came into official use. The team finished sixth.

=== 1996 Atlanta ===
The team competed in the 1996 Summer Paralympics, from 16 to 25 August 1996, in the GSU Sports Arena building, Atlanta, Georgia, United States of America. There were twelve men's and eight women's teams. The team finished seventh.

== World Championships ==
=== 1990 Calgary ===
The team competed in the 1990 World Championships, in Calgary, Alberta, Canada. There were twelve men's and seven women's teams. They finished seventh overall.

=== 2002 Rio de Janeiro ===
The team competed in the 2002 World Championships, in Rio de Janeiro, Brazil, from 30 August 2002 to 8 September 2002. There were fourteen men's and ten women's teams. They finished tenth overall.

=== 2006 Spartanburg ===
The team competed in the 2006 World Championships, in July 2006, in Spartanburg, South Carolina, United States of America. There were sixteen men's and thirteen women's teams. They finished twelfth, ahead of South Africa.

=== 2022 Matosinhos ===
The team competed in the 2022 World Championships from 7 to 16 December 2022, at the Centro de Desportos e Congressos de Matosinhos, Portugal. There were sixteen men's and sixteen women's teams. They placed third in Pool A, and second in final standings behind Turkey.

== IBSA World Games ==
=== 2003 Quebec City ===
The team competed in the 2003 IBSA World Games from 1 to 10 August 2011, in Quebec City, Canada. Ten teams competed. The first stage was pool play with five teams per pool and the top two teams in each pool advancing to the next round.

=== 2007 São Paulo ===
The team competed in the 2007 IBSA World Games, from 28 July 2007 to 8 August 2007, in São Paulo, Brazil. The women's goalball competition included thirteen teams, including this one. The competition was a 2008 Summer Paralympics qualifying event.

=== 2011 Antalya ===
The team competed in the 2011 IBSA World Games from 1 to 10 April 2011, in Antalya, Turkey, organised by the Turkish Blind Sports Federation. In Group X, they lost to Germany 6:13, Hungary 2:4, Israel 3:6, Canada 6:14, Spain 2:0, and Australia 3:8. They finished fourteenth in the final standings.

== Regional championships ==
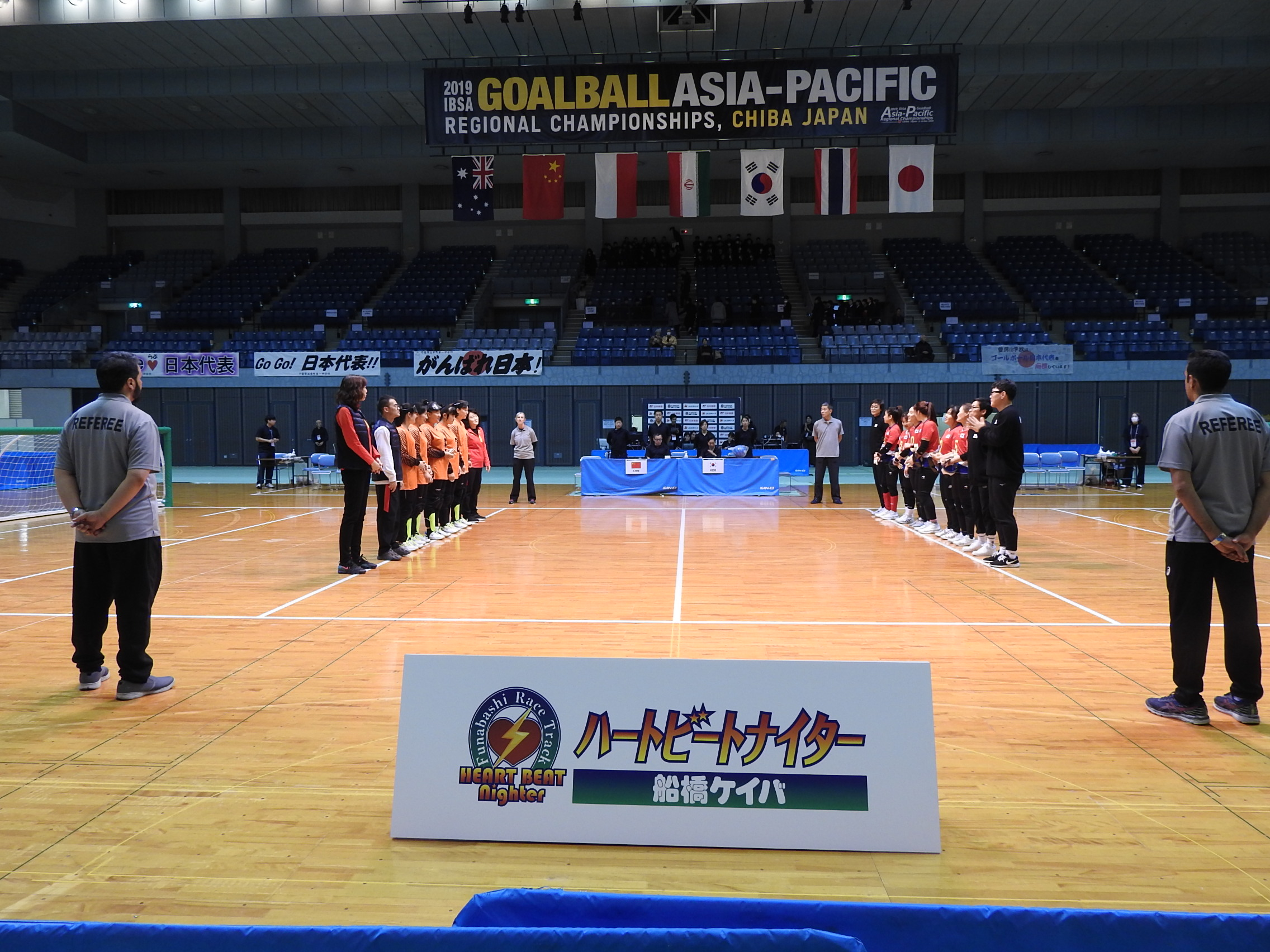
China and South Korea women's goalball teams lined up at the IBSA Asia regional championships, Chiba city, Chiba, Japan (December 2019).

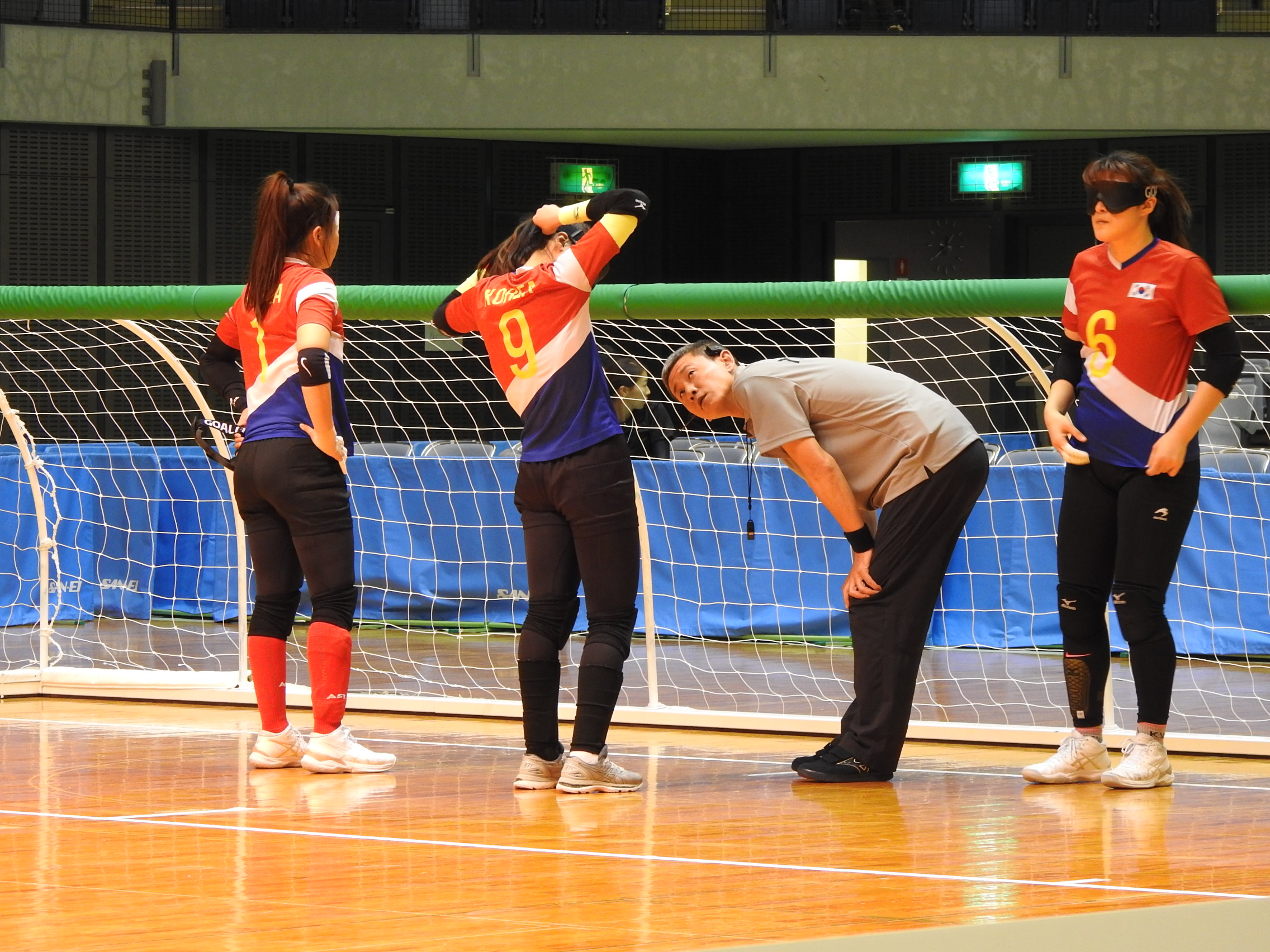
Eyeshade inspections at the IBSA Asia regional championships, Chiba city, Chiba, Japan (December 2019).

The team competed in IBSA Asia goalball region, and from January 2010 became part of the IBSA Asia-Pacific goalball competition region.

=== 2017 Bangkok ===
The team competed in the 2017 IBSA Asia/Pacific Goalball Regional Championships, from Monday 21 to Saturday 26 August 2017, in the Thai-Japan Sports Stadium, Din Daeng, Bangkok, Thailand. There were seven men's and five women's teams. The team came fourth.

=== 2019 Chiba ===
The team competed in the 2019 IBSA Goalball Asia-Pacific Regional Championships, from Thursday 5 to Tuesday 10 December 2019, in the Chiba Port Arena, Chiba, Japan. There were seven men's and six women's teams. They placed third overall.

=== 2022 Bahrain ===
Due to the COVID-19 pandemic, the 2021 IBSA Goalball Asia-Pacific Regional Championships were moved from November 2021 to 21 March 2022 in Asan, South Korea. The championships was finally held at the Bahrain Sports Federation for Disabilities Sports Centre, in Riffa, Bahrain from Monday 25 July 2022 to Friday 29 July 2022. The top two teams of each division are eligible for the World Championships in December 2022.

There were four women's teams: Australia, Iran, South Korea, Thailand. They placed first in the round-robin, and first overall.

== Competitive history ==
The table below contains individual game results for the team in international matches and competitions.

Year	Event	Opponent	Date	Venue	Team	Team	Winner	Ref
2003	IBSA World Championships and Games	Turkey	7 August	Quebec City, Canada	13	3	South Korea	
2003	IBSA World Championships and Games	Finland	7 August	Quebec City, Canada	8	1	Finland	
2003	IBSA World Championships and Games	Japan	7 August	Quebec City, Canada	0	3	Japan	
2003	IBSA World Championships and Games	Sweden	7 August	Quebec City, Canada	2	3	Sweden	
2007	IBSA World Championships and Games	Japan	31 July	Brazil	11	1	Japan	
2007	IBSA World Championships and Games	Ukraine	31 July	Brazil	14	4	Ukraine	
2007	IBSA World Championships and Games	Brazil	2 August	Brazil	1	11	Brazil	
2007	IBSA World Championships and Games	Spain	3 August	Brazil	0	10	Spain	
2007	IBSA World Championships and Games	Australia	4 August	Brazil	9	3	Australia	

=== Goal scoring by competition ===
Player	Goals	Competition	Notes	Ref
You Ran Kim	4	2007 IBSA World Championships and Games		
Jung Hye Choe	2	2007 IBSA World Championships and Games		
Lim Sun Hwa	2	2007 IBSA World Championships and Games		
Mi Ran Jlong	1	2007 IBSA World Championships and Games		

== See also ==
- Disabled sports
- South Korea at the Paralympics
