= Iran women's national goalball team =

Iranian national team, for the Paralympic sport of goalball

- Sport: Goalball
- League: IBSA
- Division: Women
- Region: IBSA Asia
- Location: Iran
- Colours: White, black
- Championships: Paralympic Games medals: : 0: 0: 0 World Championship medals: : 0: 0: 0

Iran women's national goalball team is the women's national team of Iran. Goalball is a team sport designed specifically for athletes with a vision impairment. The team takes part in international competitions.

== IBSA World Games ==
=== 2007 São Paulo ===
The team competed in the 2007 IBSA World Games, from 28 July 2007 to 8 August 2007, in São Paulo, Brazil. The women's goalball competition included thirteen teams, including this one. The competition was a 2008 Summer Paralympics qualifying event. Maryam Dousti was seventh in the competition in scoring with 13 points.

== Regional championships ==
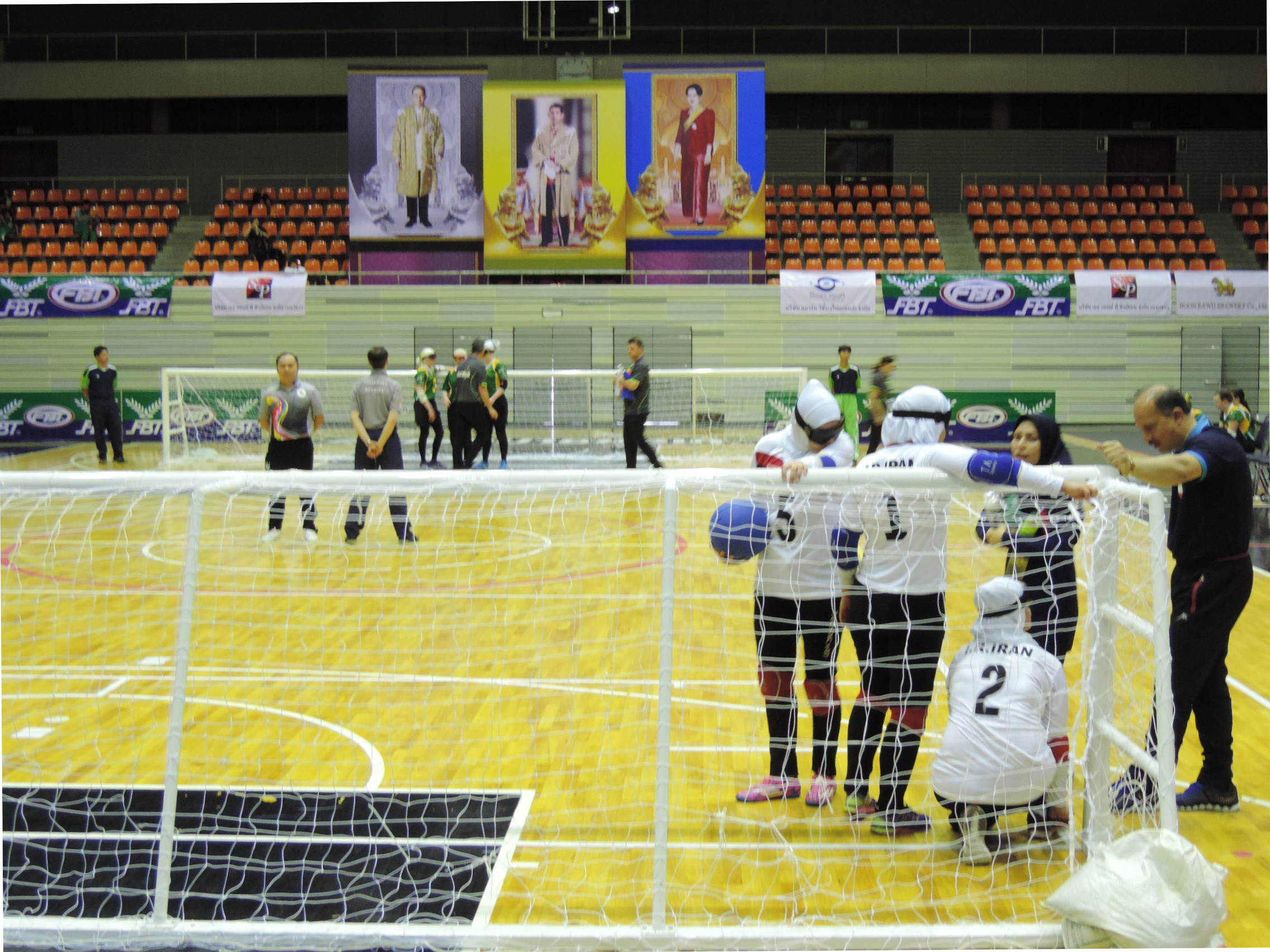
Iran women's goalball team. Goalball at the IBSA Asia regional championships, Din Daeng, Bangkok, Thailand (Aug 2017).

The team competes in IBSA Asia goalball region, and from January 2010 became part of the IBSA Asia-Pacific goalball competition region.

=== 2013 Beijing ===
The team competed in the 2013 IBSA Asia Pacific Goalball Regional Championships, from 11 to 16 November 2013, in Beijing, China. Of the six men's teams (Australia, China, Iran, Japan, Mongolia, Thailand), the team came ranked third, ahead of Australia.

=== 2017 Bangkok ===
The team competed in the 2017 IBSA Asia/Pacific Goalball Regional Championships, from Monday 21 to Saturday 26 August 2017, in the Thai-Japan Sports Stadium, Din Daeng, Bangkok, Thailand. There were seven men's and five women's teams.

The team did not rank in the top four.

=== 2022 Bahrain ===
Due to the COVID-19 pandemic, the 2021 IBSA Goalball Asia-Pacific Regional Championships were moved from November 2021 to 21 March 2022 in Asan, South Korea. The championships was finally held at the Bahrain Sports Federation for Disabilities Sports Centre, in Riffa, Bahrain from Monday 25 July 2022 to Friday 29 July 2022. The top two teams of each division are eligible for the World Championships in December 2022.

There were four women's teams: Australia, Iran, South Korea, Thailand. They placed second in the round-robin, and third overall.

== FESPIC Games ==
=== 2006 Kuala Lumpur ===
In 2006, the team participated in the ninth edition of the FESPIC Games held in Kuala Lumpur. They were one of three teams competing, the other two being China and Japan.

== Goal scoring by competition ==
Player	Goals	Competition	Notes	Ref
Maryam Dousti	13	2007 IBSA World Championships and Games		
Fatemeh Gamsari	11	2007 IBSA World Championships and Games		
Maryam Koufallah	5	2007 IBSA World Championships and Games		
Samira Jalilvand	2	2007 IBSA World Championships and Games		

== Competitive history ==
The table below contains individual game results for the team in international matches and competitions.

Year	Event	Opponent	Date	Venue	Team	Team	Winner	Ref
2006	FESPIC Games	China	24 November	Kuala Lumpur	1	11	China	
2006	FESPIC Games	Japan	26 November	Kuala Lumpur	2	6	Iran	
2006	FESPIC Games	Japan	28 November	Kuala Lumpur	3	3		
2006	FESPIC Games	China	29 November	Kuala Lumpur	8	4	China	
2006	FESPIC Games	China	30 November	Kuala Lumpur	8	2	China	
2007	IBSA World Championships and Games	Finland	31 July	Brazil	7	5	Finland	
2007	IBSA World Championships and Games	Greece	1 August	Brazil	4	4		
2007	IBSA World Championships and Games	Sweden	1 August	Brazil	10	1	Sweden	
2007	IBSA World Championships and Games	Germany	2 August	Brazil	5	13	Germany	
2007	IBSA World Championships and Games	Great Britain	3 August	Brazil	7	9	Great Britain	

== See also ==
- Disabled sports
- Iran at the Paralympics
