= Goalball at the 2015 ASEAN Para Games =

Goalball at the 2015 ASEAN Para Games was held at Hall D, Marina Bay Sands, Singapore.

== Medal table ==
Rank	Nation	Gold	Silver	Bronze	Total
1	Thailand (THA)	2	0	0	2
2	Laos (LAO)	0	1	0	1
2	Malaysia (MAS)	0	1	0	1
4	Indonesia (INA)	0	0	1	1
4	Myanmar (MYA)	0	0	1	1
Totals (5 entries)		2	2	2	6

== Medalists ==
Event	Gold	Silver	Bronze
Men	Thailand (THA); Buncha Fankhamai; Siwarin Phonphirun; Noppadon Poosrisom; Tanapong Wangtrongjitr; Saknarin Khlaisuwan; Pornchai Chadmee	Malaysia (MAS); Sathirao Chinaya; Muhammad Haiqal Azani bin Azman; Muneer Ridwan bin Abdul Rahman; Muhammad Amirul bin Ahmad; Shah Aizat bin Shahrin; Badrul Hisam bin Musa	Indonesia (INA); Arif Setiawan; Amirudin; Ende Raran; Ak Zaelani
Women	Thailand (THA); Ornpreeya Mongkolsittichai; Yada Jaengsawang; Sutasinee Potita; Phitchaya Srathongta; Chalita Eiamnuch; Thatnaret Pasoedphan	Laos (LAO); Inpheng Vilayhong; Chanphone Saysomphou; Sonemaly Xaysomphou; Soukdavy Saysomphou; La Dalavong; Latsamy Vongsaketthip	Myanmar (MYA); Kwan Nan; Mary Aung; Lay Nwe; Moet Moet Tun; Ei Ei Phyo; Yamin Htut
