= United States women's junior national goalball team =

International goalball team

United States women's junior national goalball team is the women's junior national team of the United States. It takes part in international goalball competitions.

== World Championships ==
The 2005 Junior World Championships were held in Colorado Springs, Colorado. The team was one of three teams participating, and they finished first overall.

== IBSA World Youth and Student Games ==
The 2007 IBSA (International Blind Sports Federation) World Youth and Student Games were held in the United States. The team was one of four teams participating, with the United States finishing first, Germany second, Russia third and Canada fourth.

== Competitive history ==
The table below contains individual game results for the team in international matches and competitions.

Year	Event	Opponent	Date	Venue	Team	Team	Winner	Ref
2007	IBSA World Youth and Student Games	Canada	14 July	United States - Main Gym	11	1	United States	
2007	IBSA World Youth and Student Games	Germany	14 July	United States - Main Gym	3	7	United States	
