= Austria men's national goalball team =

Austrian national team, for the Paralympic sport of goalball

Austria men's national goalball team is the men's national team of Austria. Goalball is a team sport designed specifically for athletes with a vision impairment. The team takes part in international competitions.

== Paralympic Games ==
The 1976 Summer Paralympics were held in Toronto, Canada. The team was one of seven teams participating, and they finished first overall. At the 1980 Summer Paralympics in Arnhem, Netherlands, twelve teams took part. The team finished fourth. New York hosted the 1984 Summer Paralympics where thirteen teams participated and the team finished fifth.

== Regional championships ==
The team has participated in the IBSA goalball regional championships, including coming first in the 1983 Greeve (Denmark) championships, and attending the 1985 Olsztyn, 1987 Milton Keynes, and 1989 Vejle championships.

== See also ==
- Disabled sports
- Austria women's national goalball team
- Austria at the Paralympics
