= Thai-Japanese Stadium =

Stadium in Bangkok, Thailand

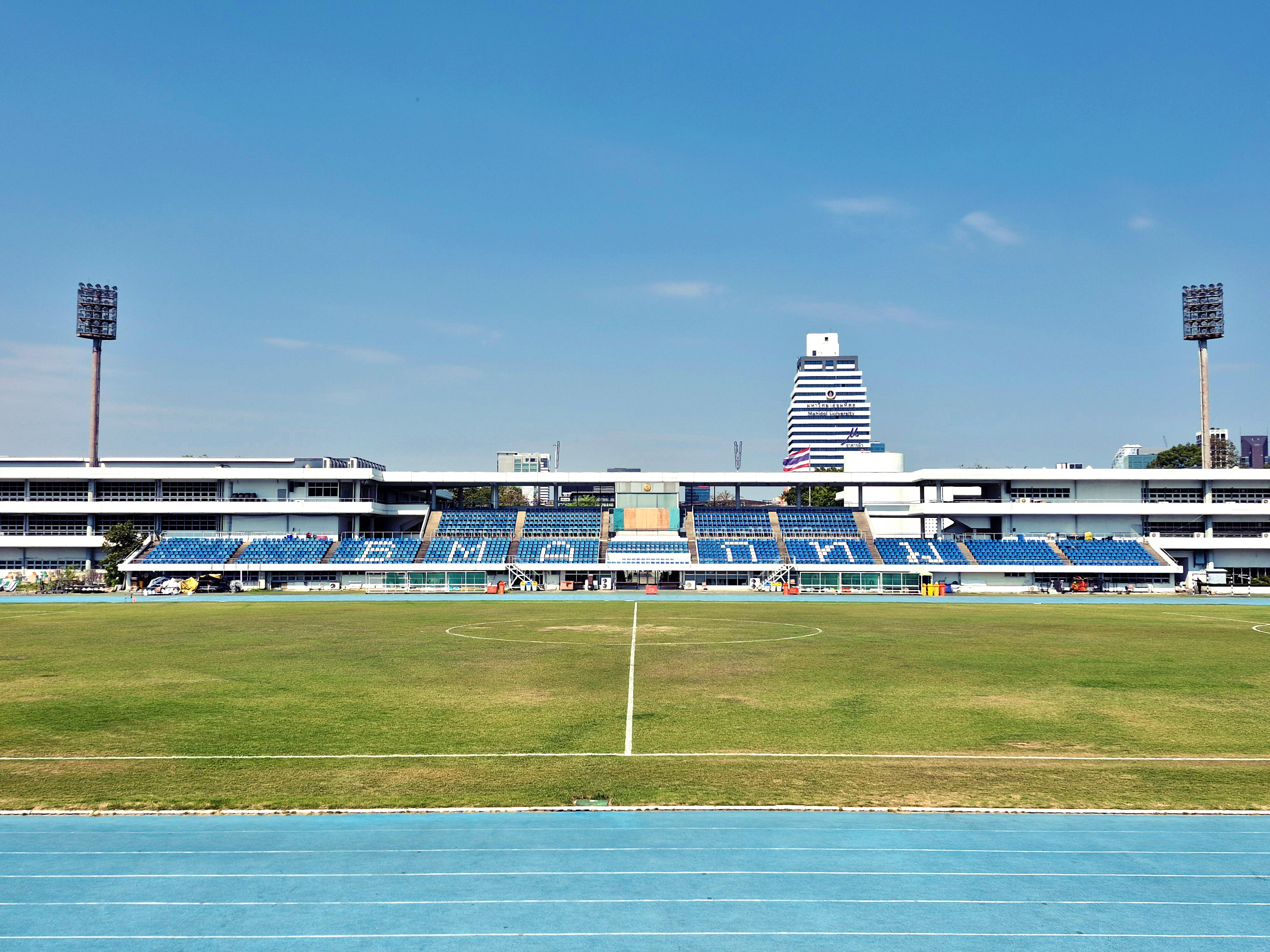
- Interactive map of Thai-Japanese Stadium
- Location: Din Daeng, Bangkok, Thailand
- Coordinates: 13°46′00″N 100°33′10″E
- Owner: Bangkok Metropolitan Administration
- Operator: Bangkok Metropolitan Administration
- Capacity: 6,600 (capacity reduced after it became all-seated)
- Surface: Grass
- Public transit: MRT Din Daeng (from 2030)

Tenant
- 1999 ASEAN University Games closing ceremony

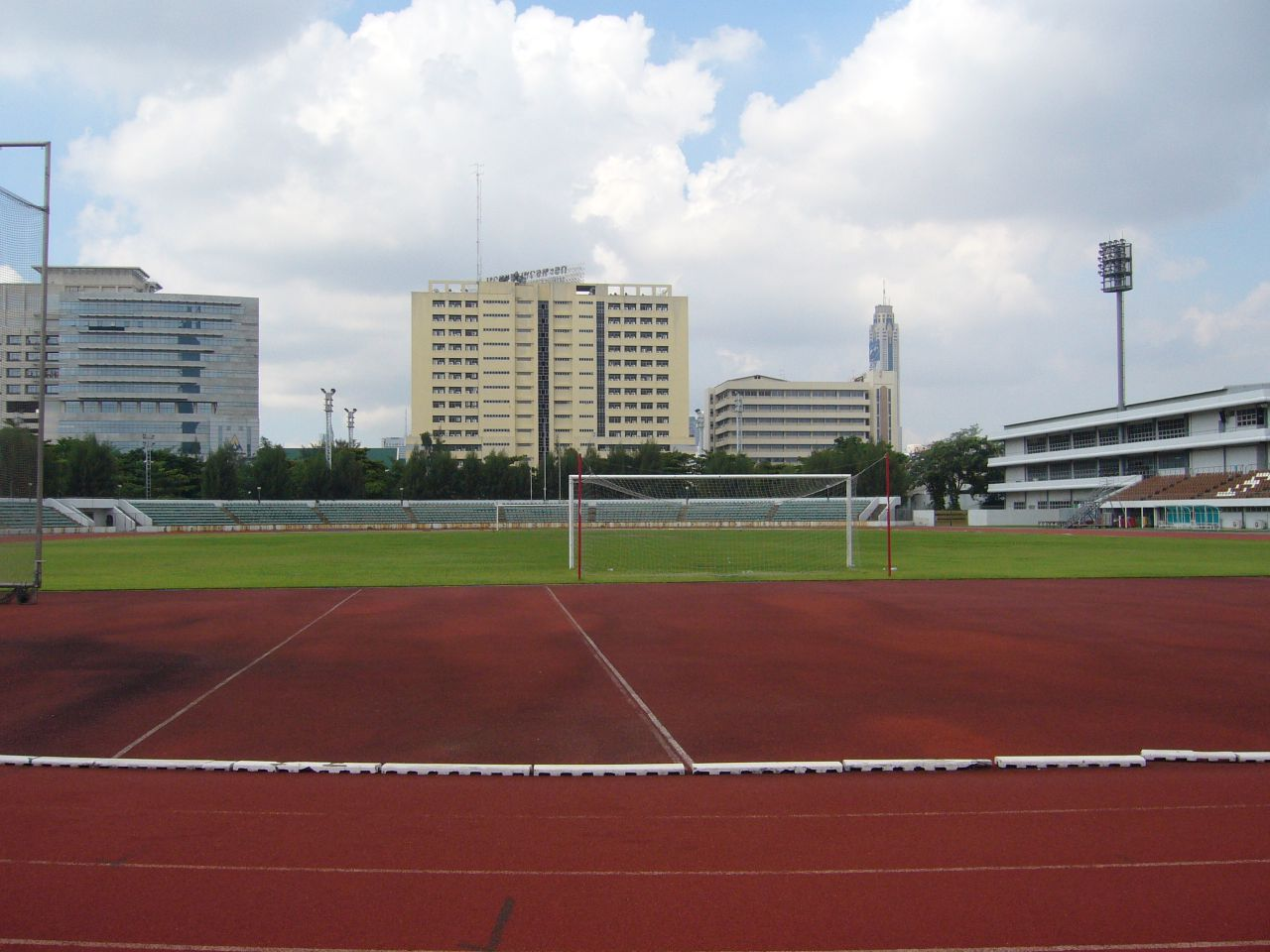
Thai-Japanese Stadium in 2011.

The Thai-Japanese Stadium (Japanese: タイ・ジャパニーズ・スタジアム; Thai: ศูนย์เยาวชนกรุงเทพมหานคร), also called Thai-Japanese Bangkok Youth Center (ศูนย์เยาวชนกรุงเทพมหานคร (ไทย - ญี่ปุ่น), is a multi-purpose stadium in Din Daeng, Bangkok, Thailand. It is currently used mostly for football matches and is the home stadium of Bangkok United of the Thai Premier League. The stadium holds 6,600 spectators

It is one of the more substantial stadiums in Bangkok. On one side is a - barely - covered stand fitted with red seats. 'B M A' (Bangkok Metropolitan Administration) is picked out in white seats (The BMA owns the stadium). The rest of the stadium is a continuous ring with seats fitted throughout (unusual in Thailand). The word 'BANGKOK' has been picked out with white seats in the stand opposite the main stand. This stand also has an insignificant cover. Unusually for a Thai stadium there is a perimeter fence on three sides separating the stands from the pitch.

Other stadiums in Bangkok include the Thai Army Sports Stadium, National Stadium, Rajamangala National Stadium and Chulalongkorn University Stadium.

Most recently the stadium hosted the 2018 Youth Olympic Games Asian Area Qualification trials in early July.
