= 2019 World Rowing Championships – PR2 Mixed double sculls =

PR2 Mixed double sculls at the 2019 World Rowing Championships
- Venue: Linz-Ottensheim
- Location: Ottensheim, Austria
- Dates: 25–31 August
- Competitors: 28 from 14 nations
- Winning time: 8:34.95

Medalists
gold medal	Lauren Rowles; Laurence Whiteley	Great Britain
silver medal	Annika van der Meer; Corne de Koning	Netherlands
bronze medal	Perle Bouge; Christophe Lavigne	France

The PR2 mixed double sculls competition at the 2019 World Rowing Championships took place at the Linz-Ottensheim regatta venue. A top-eight finish ensured qualification for the Tokyo Paralympics.

== Schedule ==
The schedule was as follows:

Date	Time	Round
Sunday 25 August 2019	09:30	Heats
Tuesday 27 August 2019	11:13	Repechage
Thursday 29 August 2019	11:02	Semifinals A/B
Saturday 31 August 2019	10:48	Final B
Saturday 31 August 2019	13:05	Final A

All times are Central European Summer Time (UTC+2)

== Results ==
=== Heats ===
The three fastest boats in each heat advanced directly to the A/B semifinals. The remaining boats were sent to the repechage.

==== Heat 1 ====
Rank	Rowers	Country	Time	Notes
1	Annika van der Meer; Corne de Koning	Netherlands	8:28.09	SA/B
2	Josiane Lima; Michel Pessanha	Brazil	8:50.54	SA/B
3	Liu Shuang; Jiang Jijian	China	9:31.62	SA/B
4	Inés Felipe; Jorge Pineda	Spain	11:23.08	R
–	Numtip Sinchai; Voranipit Boonmark	Thailand	DNS	

==== Heat 2 ====
Rank	Rowers	Country	Time	Notes
1	Perle Bouge; Christophe Lavigne	France	8:28.14	SA/B
2	Svitlana Bohuslavska; Iaroslav Koiuda	Ukraine	8:33.18	SA/B
3	Egor Frolov; Irina Kriukova	Russia	9:01.86	SA/B
4	Jessye Brockway; Jeremy Hall	Canada	9:05.73	R
5	Otabek Kuchkorov; Gulchiroy Esanbaeva	Uzbekistan	10:02.54	R

==== Heat 3 ====
Rank	Rowers	Country	Time	Notes
1	Lauren Rowles; Laurence Whiteley	Great Britain	8:13.86	SA/B
2	Michał Gadowski; Jolanta Majka	Poland	8:31.55	SA/B
3	Laura Goodkind; Russell Gernaat	United States	8:50.32	SA/B
4	Amalia Sedlmayr; Marcus Klemp	Germany	9:11.34	R

=== Repechage ===
The three fastest boats advanced to the A/B semifinals. The remaining boat took no further part in the competition.

Rank	Rowers	Country	Time	Notes
1	Amalia Sedlmayr; Marcus Klemp	Germany	8:53.20	SA/B
2	Jessye Brockway; Jeremy Hall	Canada	9:12.80	SA/B
3	Otabek Kuchkorov; Gulchiroy Esanbaeva	Uzbekistan	9:37.24	SA/B
4	Inés Felipe; Jorge Pineda	Spain	10:48.97	

=== Semifinals ===
The three fastest boats in each semi advanced to the A final. The remaining boats were sent to the B final.

==== Semifinal 1 ====
Rank	Rowers	Country	Time	Notes
1	Annika van der Meer; Corne de Koning	Netherlands	8:11.58	FA
2	Perle Bouge; Christophe Lavigne	France	8:21.26	FA
3	Michał Gadowski; Jolanta Majka	Poland	8:25.49	FA
4	Egor Frolov; Irina Kriukova	Russia	8:47.67	FB
5	Otabek Kuchkorov; Gulchiroy Esanbaeva	Uzbekistan	9:20.58	FB
6	Amalia Sedlmayr; Marcus Klemp	Germany	9:52.09	FB

==== Semifinal 2 ====
Rank	Rowers	Country	Time	Notes
1	Lauren Rowles; Laurence Whiteley	Great Britain	8:07.33	FA, WCHB
2	Svitlana Bohuslavska; Iaroslav Koiuda	Ukraine	8:21.73	FA
3	Josiane Lima; Michel Pessanha	Brazil	8:26.98	FA
4	Liu Shuang; Jiang Jijian	China	8:37.54	FB
5	Laura Goodkind; Russell Gernaat	United States	8:41.30	FB
6	Jessye Brockway; Jeremy Hall	Canada	8:53.21	FB

=== Finals ===
The A final determined the rankings for places 1 to 6. Additional rankings were determined in the B final.

==== Final B ====
Rank	Rowers	Country	Time
1	Liu Shuang; Jiang Jijian	China	8:49.14
2	Laura Goodkind; Russell Gernaat	United States	8:54.42
3	Amalia Sedlmayr; Marcus Klemp	Germany	8:59.65
4	Egor Frolov; Irina Kriukova	Russia	9:00.22
5	Jessye Brockway; Jeremy Hall	Canada	9:04.80
6	Otabek Kuchkorov; Gulchiroy Esanbaeva	Uzbekistan	10:04.98

==== Final A ====
Rank	Rowers	Country	Time
1st place, gold medalist(s)	Lauren Rowles; Laurence Whiteley	Great Britain	8:34.95
2nd place, silver medalist(s)	Annika van der Meer; Corne de Koning	Netherlands	8:37.78
3rd place, bronze medalist(s)	Perle Bouge; Christophe Lavigne	France	9:02.60
4	Svitlana Bohuslavska; Iaroslav Koiuda	Ukraine	9:06.25
5	Josiane Lima; Michel Pessanha	Brazil	9:13.16
6	Michał Gadowski; Jolanta Majka	Poland	9:18.92
