= Rowing at the 2020 Summer Paralympics – Mixed double sculls =

Mixed double sculls at the XVI Paralympic Games
- Venue: Sea Forest Waterway
- Date: 27 – 29 August 2021
- Competitors: 24 from 12 nations

Medalists
1st place, gold medalist(s)		Laurence Whiteley; Lauren Rowles	Great Britain
2nd place, silver medalist(s)		Annika van der Meer; Corné de Koning	Netherlands
3rd place, bronze medalist(s)		Liu Shuang; Jiang Jijian	China

The mixed double sculls competition at the 2020 Summer Paralympics in Tokyo took place at the Sea Forest Waterway.

== Results ==
=== Heats ===
The winner of each heat qualified to the finals, the remainder went to the repechage.

==== Heat 1 ====
Rank	Lane	Rower	Nation	Time	Notes
1	1	Liu Shuang; Jiang Jijian	China	8:46.15	FA
2	4	Annika van der Meer; Corné de Koning	Netherlands	8:55.16	R
3	6	Chiara Nardo; Gian Filippo Mirabile	Italy	9:04.22	R
4	3	Josiane Dias de Lima; Michel Gomes Pessanha	Brazil	9:19.28	R
5	5	Jessye Brockway; Jeremy Hall	Canada	9:43.91	R
6	2	Christophe Lavigne; Perle Bouge	France	BUW	R

==== Heat 2 ====
Rank	Lane	Rower	Nation	Time	Notes
1	5	Laurence Whiteley; Lauren Rowles	Great Britain	8:42.27	FA, PB
2	6	Svitlana Bohuslavska; Iaroslav Koiuda	Ukraine	8:49.68	R
3	4	Simon Albury; Kathryn Ross	Australia	8:51.39	R
4	2	Jolanta Majka; Michał Gadowski	Poland	9:04.15	R
5	1	Laura Goodkind; Russell Gernaat	United States	9:27.00	R
6	3	Feruza Buriboeva; Otabek Kuchkorov	Uzbekistan	9:31.97	R

=== Repechages ===
The first two of each heat qualified to the finals, the remainder went to Final B.

==== Repechage 1 ====
Rank	Lane	Rower	Nation	Time	Notes
1	3	Annika van der Meer; Corné de Koning	Netherlands	8:10.35	FA, PB
2	4	Jolanta Majka; Michał Gadowski	Poland	8:11.98	FA
3	2	Simon Albury; Kathryn Ross	Australia	8:12.90	FB
4	5	Christophe Lavigne; Perle Bouge	France	8:27.49	FB
5	1	Jessye Brockway; Jeremy Hall	Canada	9:11.14	FB

==== Repechage 2 ====
Rank	Lane	Rower	Nation	Time	Notes
1	3	Svitlana Bohuslavska; Iaroslav Koiuda	Ukraine	8:17.99	FA
2	4	Chiara Nardo; Gian Filippo Mirabile	Italy	8:20.98	FA
3	2	Josiane Dias de Lima; Michel Gomes Pessanha	Brazil	8:25.16	FB
4	5	Laura Goodkind; Russell Gernaat	United States	8:26.17	FB
5	1	Feruza Buriboeva; Otabek Kuchkorov	Uzbekistan	8:55.42	FB

=== Finals ===
==== Final B ====
Rank	Lane	Rower	Nation	Time	Notes
7	4	Simon Albury; Kathryn Ross	Australia	8:56.69	
8	3	Josiane Dias de Lima; Michel Gomes Pessanha	Brazil	9:05.60	
9	2	Christophe Lavigne; Perle Bouge	France	9:10.85	
10	5	Laura Goodkind; Russell Gernaat	United States	9:11.63	
11	6	Feruza Buriboeva; Olabek Kuchkorov	Uzbekistan	9:43.04	
12	1	Jessye Brockway; Jeremy Hall	Canada	9:53.64	

==== Final A ====
Rank	Lane	Rower	Nation	Time	Notes
1st place, gold medalist(s)	1	Laurence Whiteley; Lauren Rowles	Great Britain	8:38.99	
2nd place, silver medalist(s)	3	Annika van der Meer; Corné de Koning	Netherlands	8:43.85	
3rd place, bronze medalist(s)	2	Liu Shuang; Jiang Jijian	China	8:49.42	
4	4	Svitlana Bohuslavska; Iaroslav Koiuda	Ukraine	8:54.97	
5	6	Chiara Nardo; Gian Filippo Mirabile	Italy	9:11.65	
6	5	Jolanta Majka; Michał Gadowski	Poland	9:29.81	
