= 2023 World Rowing Championships – PR2 Mixed double sculls =

PR2 Mixed double sculls at the 2023 World Rowing Championships
- Venue: Lake Sava
- Location: Belgrade, Serbia
- Dates: 5 September – 9 September
- Competitors: 22 from 11 nations
- Winning time: 8:45.67

Medalists
gold medal	Lauren Rowles; Gregg Stevenson	Great Britain
silver medal	Liu Shuang; Jiang Jijian	China
bronze medal	Jolanta Majka; Michał Gadowski	Poland

The PR2 Mixed double sculls competition at the 2023 World Rowing Championships took place at Lake Sava, in Belgrade.

== Schedule ==
The schedule was as follows:

Date	Time	Round
Tuesday 5 September 2023	10:30	Heats
Wednesday 6 September 2023	10:30	Repechages
Saturday 9 September 2023	10:50	Final B
Saturday 9 September 2023	13:05	Final A

All times are Central European Summer Time (UTC+2)

== Results ==
=== Heats ===
The best fastest boats in each heat advanced directly to the Final A. The remaining boats were sent to the repechages.

==== Heat 1 ====
Rank	Rower	Country	Time	Notes
1	Steven McGowan; Katie O'Brien	Ireland	8:12.01	FA
2	Jolanta Majka; Michał Gadowski	Poland	8:13.61	R
3	Perle Bouge; Stéphane Tardieu	France	8:23.86	R
4	Gessyca Guerra; Leandro Sagaz	Brazil	8:25.00	R
5	Iaroslav Koiuda; Svitlana Bohuslavska	Ukraine	8:36.54	R
6	Miguel Nieto; Ángeles Gutiérrez	Mexico	8:48.27	R

==== Heat 2 ====
Rank	Rower	Country	Time	Notes
1	Lauren Rowles; Gregg Stevenson	Great Britain	8:00.57	FA
2	Liu Shuang; Jiang Jijian	China	8:03.72	R
3	Corné de Koning; Chantal Haenen	Netherlands	8:12.41	R
4	Shahar Milfelder; Saleh Shahin	Israel	8:15.85	R
5	Madison Eberhard; Russell Gernaat	United States	9:03.93	R

=== Repechages ===
The two fastest boats in each heat advanced directly to the final A. The remaining boats were sent to the final B

==== Repechage 1 ====
Rank	Rower	Country	Time	Notes
1	Jolanta Majka; Michał Gadowski	Poland	8:46.25	FA
2	Corné de Koning; Chantal Haenen	Netherlands	8:51.45	FA
3	Gessyca Guerra; Leandro Sagaz	Brazil	8:53.93	FB
4	Madison Eberhard; Russell Gernaat	United States	9:12.74	FB
5	Miguel Nieto; Ángeles Gutiérrez	Mexico	9:38.41	FB

==== Repechage 2 ====
Rank	Rower	Country	Time	Notes
1	Liu Shuang; Jiang Jijian	China	8:29.63	FA
2	Svitlana Bohuslavska; Iaroslav Koiuda	Ukraine	8:38.20	FA
3	Shahar Milfelder; Saleh Shahin	Israel	8:38.52	FB
4	Perle Bouge; Stéphane Tardieu	France	8:55.83	FB

=== Finals ===
The A final determined the rankings for places 1 to 6. Additional rankings were determined in the other finals.

==== Final B ====
Rank	Rower	Country	Time	Total rank
1	Shahar Milfelder; Saleh Shahin	Israel	8:25.18	7
2	Perle Bouge; Stéphane Tardieu	France	8:30.42	8
3	Gessyca Guerra; Leandro Sagaz	Brazil	8:32.87	9
4	Madison Eberhard; Russell Gernaat	United States	8:48.02	10
5	Miguel Nieto; Ángeles Gutiérrez	Mexico	8:59.02	11

==== Final A ====
Rank	Rower	Country	Time
1st place, gold medalist(s)	Lauren Rowles; Gregg Stevenson	Great Britain	8:45.67
2nd place, silver medalist(s)	Liu Shuang; Jiang Jijian	China	8:47.28
3rd place, bronze medalist(s)	Jolanta Majka; Michał Gadowski	Poland	9:05.13
4	Corné de Koning; Chantal Haenen	Netherlands	9:08.99
5	Steven McGowan; Katie O'Brien	Ireland	9:11.02
6	Svitlana Bohuslavska; Iaroslav Koiuda	Ukraine	9:17.77
