= List of LGBTQ Paralympians =

There have been 81 (Note: Based on the information collected on this page) modern Paralympians, at both the Summer and Winter Paralympic Games, who have identified as lesbian, gay, bisexual, transgender, pansexual, non-binary, queer, or who have openly been in a same-sex relationship. The first Paralympic Games in which an athlete now known to be LGBT+ competed was the 1984 Winter Paralympics.

Despite growing numbers of out LGBTQ Paralympians with each Summer Games in the 21st century, the media coverage of these athletes was significantly lower than the vastly growing coverage of LGBTQ Olympians, if present at all. Fusion suggested that besides low coverage causing a self-justifying lack of interest, there may be a failure to report on the intersection of Paralympians who are queer due to wider media treatment of Paralympians as disabled tropes and societal perceptions of disabled people as desexualised.

Like with LGBTQ+ Olympic athletes, there have been more openly queer Summer than Winter Paralympians. Unlike with Olympians, however, the number of out LGBTQ+ Winter Paralympians was, through 2022, largely stagnant rather than gradually increasing. Fusion suggested this may be related to the Winter Games being held in homophobic nations and greater fear among double marginalised LGBTQ+ Paralympians to be publicly out, with discrimination cited as a reason there are fewer out Paralympians than Olympians across both seasons despite significant prevalence of disability in the queer community. In 2026, with six out Winter Paralympians, magazine Out referred to the significant increase as making the Games "more queer than [they] had hoped".

The most decorated LGBT+ Para- and/or Olympian overall is British Paralympic equestrian Lee Pearson, with 17 medals including 14 golds. (Note: Australian Paralympic swimmer Ellie Cole also has 17 medals, six of which are golds.) At least 48 LGBT+ Paralympians are medalists (59.26% of LGBT+ Paralympians), of which 27 have at least one gold medal (33.33%).

== Overview ==
By country
Country	Number of Paralympians			
Country	F	M	NB	Total
Australia	2	1	2	5
Belgium	1	—	—	1
Brazil	9	1	—	10
Canada	4	1	—	5
Chile	1	—	—	1
France	2	1	—	3
Germany	3	—	—	3
Great Britain	11	3	—	14
Iceland	—	1	—	1
Ireland	2	—	—	2
Israel	2	—	—	2
Italy	1	—	—	1
Mexico	1	—	—	1
Netherlands	1	1	—	2
Singapore	1	—	—	1
South Africa	1	—	—	1
United States	19	2	2	23

By year
Games	Number of Paralympians (Note: Including multi-year appearances of the same Paralympian.)			
Games	F	M	NB	Total
1984 Winter	1	—	—	1
1992 Summer	1	—	—	1
1996 Summer	1	—	—	1
2000 Summer	2	1	—	3
2002 Winter	1	—	—	1
2004 Summer	5	3	—	8
2006 Winter	1	—	—	1
2008 Summer	12	2	—	14
2010 Winter	2	—	—	2
2012 Summer	24	2	—	26
2014 Winter	2	1	—	3
2016 Summer	35	4	1	40
2018 Winter	2	1	—	3
2020 Summer (Note: Took place in 2021 due to the COVID-19 pandemic.)	43	5	3	51
2022 Winter	—	1	—	1
2024 Summer	40	6	2	48
2026 Winter	4	2	—	6

By sport
Sport	Number of Paralympians by gender (Note: Including multi-disciplinary Paralympians)					
Sport	Female		Male		Non-binary	Total
Sport	Cisgender	Transgender	Cisgender	Transgender	Non-binary	Total
Alpine skiing	2	—	1	—	—	3
Athletics	9	1 (Note: Competed in a women's category)	1	1	2	14
Cross-country skiing	3	—	1	—	—	4
Cycling	9	—	—	—	—	9
Equestrian	—	—	1	—	—	1
Goalball	2	—	—	—	—	2
Judo	1	—	—	—	—	1
Parabiathlon	1	—	1	—	—	2
Paracanoe	1	—	—	—	—	1
Para snowboard	1	—	—	—	—	1
Parataekwondo	1	—	—	—	—	1
Paratriathlon	3	—	1	—	—	4
Powerlifting	—	—	1	—	—	1
Rowing	6	—	—	—	1	7
Shooting	1	—	—	—	—	1
Sitting volleyball	3	—	—	—	—	3
Swimming	5	—	3	—	1	9
Wheelchair basketball	15	—	—	—	—	15
Wheelchair curling	1	—	—	—	—	1
Wheelchair fencing	2	—	—	—	—	2
Wheelchair tennis	4	—	2	—	—	6

== Paralympic athletes and coaches ==
- Tables are default sorted by first Games appearance chronologically, then current surname or common nickname alphabetically, then first name alphabetically. They can be sorted by current surname (where used) or common nickname alphabetically; by country and sport alphabetically; by Games chronologically; (Note: Where athletes have represented multiple countries, competed in multiple sports, and/or at multiple Games, the country/sport/Games they are sorted by is their first country/sport/Games chronologically.) and by medals as organised in Paralympics medals tables. (Note: Based on most golds over total medals, then alphabetically by current surname or common nickname. In cases of medals for demonstration events and honourable mentions in artistic events, these are sorted between one bronze and no medals.)

Athlete	Country	Sport	Games	Medal(s)	Notes
Laura Oftedahl	United States	Cross-country skiing	1984	2nd place, silver medalist(s)	Oftedahl was part of the American team that finished behind Austria in the cross-country women's 4x5 km relay for visually impaired skiers.
Jen Armbruster	United States	Goalball	1992, 1996, 2000, 2004, 2008, 2012, 2016	1st place, gold medalist(s) 2nd place, silver medalist(s) 3rd place, bronze medalist(s)	Armbruster is married to Asya Miller, and was widely out before 2012.
Asya Miller	United States	Goalball	2000, 2004, 2008, 2012, 2016, 2020	1st place, gold medalist(s) 2nd place, silver medalist(s) 3rd place, bronze medalist(s)	Married Jen Armbruster prior to 2012.
Lee Pearson	Great Britain	Equestrian	2000, 2004, 2008, 2012, 2016, 2020	1st place, gold medalist(s) 2nd place, silver medalist(s) 3rd place, bronze medalist(s)	Was widely out prior to 2012; was a Paralympic flagbearer in 2016.
Allison Jones	United States	Alpine skiing, Cycling	2002, 2004, 2006, 2008, 2010, 2012, 2014, 2016	1st place, gold medalist(s) 2nd place, silver medalist(s) 3rd place, bronze medalist(s)	Jones was a flagbearer at the Rio 2016 Paralympics in her last of eight Olympic appearances, having competed every two years alternating skiing and cycling since 2002. She married a woman in 2014.
Edênia Garcia	Brazil	Swimming	2004, 2008, 2012, 2016, 2020, 2024	2nd place, silver medalist(s) 3rd place, bronze medalist(s)	Came out widely in 2019.
Theresa Goh	Singapore	Swimming	2004, 2008, 2012, 2016	3rd place, bronze medalist(s)	Goh came out widely in 2017, though said she had never hidden her sexuality, and later reflected that the response in Singapore, where she had feared she could be jailed, had been quite positive.
David Hill	Great Britain	Swimming, Paratriathlon	2004, 2016		
Ben Weekes	Australia	Wheelchair tennis	2004, 2008, 2012, 2016, 2020, 2024		
Stephanie Wheeler	United States	Wheelchair basketball	2004, 2008, 2016	1st place, gold medalist(s)	Won gold as a player in 2004 and 2008 (after which she came out), and as coach in 2016.
Ellie Cole	Australia	Swimming	2008, 2012, 2016, 2020	1st place, gold medalist(s) 2nd place, silver medalist(s) 3rd place, bronze medalist(s)	In a relationship with partner Silvia Scognamiglio, whom she met at the London 2012 Paralympics.
Andrea Eskau	Germany	Cycling, Parabiathlon, Sitting cross-country skiing	2008, 2010, 2012, 2014, 2016, 2018, 2020, 2024, 2026	1st place, gold medalist(s) 2nd place, silver medalist(s) 3rd place, bronze medalist(s)	Eskau's partner is Amira Antar. Germany's most successful athlete, as of 2026, Eskau has only missed one Paralympic event since her debut 18 years earlier. As of 2024, she has achieved 8 gold, 5 silver and 2 bronze Paralympic medals.
Josiane Lima	Brazil	Rowing	2008, 2012, 2016, 2020	3rd place, bronze medalist(s)	Including the 2020 Games, Lima has competed at every Paralympics in which rowing has featured. She was widely out prior to the 2020 Games, and an advocate for combating queerphobia in Brazil.
Angela Madsen	United States	Rowing, Athletics	2008, 2012, 2016	3rd place, bronze medalist(s)	Madsen competed in Paralympic rowing in 2008, and then in Paralympic throwing events in 2012 and 2016, winning her bronze medal in the shot put. She came out in 1981 while in the military, a year after the military-induced injury which paralysed her. She died while rowing from Los Angeles to Hawaii in 2020.
Kgothatso Montjane	South Africa	Wheelchair tennis	2008, 2012, 2016, 2020, 2024		According to reports on her accepting an award for inspiring the South Africa LGBTQ community, Montjane identifies as queer.
Cindy Ouellet	Canada	Wheelchair basketball, Sitting cross-country skiing	2008, 2012, 2016, 2018, 2020, 2024		Ouellet competes in wheelchair basketball at the Summer Paralympics since 2008, and competed in different cross-country skiing events at the 2018 Winter Paralympics. She was widely out prior to 2018.
Monique Burkland	United States	Sitting volleyball	2012, 2016, 2020, 2024	1st place, gold medalist(s) 2nd place, silver medalist(s)	Widely out prior to competing, Burkland married her trans male partner, before he came out, in 2016. After he came out, Burkland said that her teammates were all supportive of them.
Katie-George Dunlevy	Ireland	Cycling	2012, 2016, 2020, 2024	1st place, gold medalist(s) 2nd place, silver medalist(s)	Widely out by the 2020 Games, Dunlevy had come out at the age of 29 after being in denial "for years". She noted that, while cycling is not as largely queer as football or rugby when it comes to women, her own para cycling team was majority queer women. After the 2020 Games, she also told ESPN that people only approached her as an LGBT+ sportswoman in the run-up to those Games.
Jude Hamer	Great Britain	Wheelchair basketball	2012, 2016, 2020		Widely out prior to 2020 Games, at which point she was in a relationship with pararower Lauren Rowles.
Claire Harvey	Great Britain	Sitting volleyball, Athletics	2012, 2016		Harvey competed in sitting volleyball at the 2012 Paralympics. She was set to compete in the discus throw at the 2016 Paralympics but could not due to injury. She was widely out prior to competing, saying at the 2012 Games: "I've never been in the closet. I need everything that I am to take me on that court as best I can and that's part of me... I'd like to think I'm an athlete first, and if being gay is part of that, and gives young people some inspiration then all well and good."
Crystal Lane-Wright	Great Britain	Cycling	2012, 2016, 2020	2nd place, silver medalist(s) 3rd place, bronze medalist(s)	Widely out prior to the 2020 Games.
Francisca Mardones	Chile	Wheelchair tennis, Athletics	2012, 2016, 2020, 2024	1st place, gold medalist(s)	
Desiree Miller	United States	Wheelchair basketball	2012, 2016	1st place, gold medalist(s)	Was married to German wheelchair basketball player Mareike Miller. Widely out prior to 2016.
Mareike Miller	Germany	Wheelchair basketball	2012, 2016, 2020, 2024	1st place, gold medalist(s) 2nd place, silver medalist(s)	While Miller competes at the Paralympics, she does not have a permanent disability; she took up wheelchair basketball after persistent injury curtailed her basketball career. She was a flagbearer at the 2020 Games. Was married to American wheelchair basketball player Desiree Miller.
Moran Samuel	Israel	Rowing	2012, 2016, 2020, 2024	1st place, gold medalist(s) 2nd place, silver medalist(s) 3rd place, bronze medalist(s)	After Samuel suffered a spinal stroke during her basketball career, Samuel's wife suggested she try rowing. Samuel was a flagbearer at the 2020 Paralympics.
Lucy Shuker	Great Britain	Wheelchair tennis	2012, 2016, 2020, 2024	2nd place, silver medalist(s) 3rd place, bronze medalist(s)	Widely out prior to the 2020 Games.
Marieke Vervoort	Belgium	Wheelchair racing	2012, 2016	1st place, gold medalist(s) 2nd place, silver medalist(s) 3rd place, bronze medalist(s)	Vervoort was an openly lesbian Paralympic wheelchair racer who gained wide attention when, shortly before the 2016 Rio Games, she announced she planned to die by euthanasia and that going to Rio was her last wish. She clarified this did not mean straight away; she died in 2019.
Emma Wiggs	Great Britain	Sitting volleyball, Paracanoe	2012, 2016, 2020, 2024	1st place, gold medalist(s) 2nd place, silver medalist(s)	Widely out prior to the 2020 Games. Wiggs competed in sitting volleyball in 2012, having been offered several sports at a paralympic talent identifying day but wanting to be involved in a team. After 2012, she switched to paracanoeing.
Laurie Williams	Great Britain	Wheelchair basketball	2012, 2016, 2020, 2024		Widely out prior to the 2020 Games. In a relationship with teammate Robyn Love.
Jake Adicoff	United States	Cross-country skiing; biathlon	2014, 2018, 2022, 2026	1st place, gold medalist(s) 2nd place, silver medalist(s)	
Jo Butterfield	Great Britain	Athletics, Wheelchair curling	2016, 2020, 2026	1st place, gold medalist(s)	
Yuliya Chernoy	Israel	Rowing, Shooting	2016, 2020		Married to her partner.
Hailey Danz	United States	Paratriathlon	2016, 2020, 2024	1st place, gold medalist(s) 2nd place, silver medalist(s)	Widely out by the 2020 Games.
Diede de Groot	Netherlands	Wheelchair tennis	2016, 2020, 2024	1st place, gold medalist(s) 2nd place, silver medalist(s)	
Abby Dunkin	United States	Wheelchair basketball	2016	1st place, gold medalist(s)	Widely out prior to competing.
Megan Giglia	Great Britain	Cycling	2016	1st place, gold medalist(s)	Widely out prior to competing.
Laura Goodkind	United States	Rowing	2016, 2020		Goodkind identifies as gender neutral. They compete in mixed doubles as the female partner, and was widely out prior to the 2020 Games.
Barbara Gross	Germany	Wheelchair basketball	2016, 2020	2nd place, silver medalist(s)	Also known as Babsi Gross or Groß. She won a silver medal with her team in 2016 before the governing bodies of wheelchair basketball, including the International Paralympic Committee, altered their eligibility criteria in 2020. After appealing the decision, Gross was allowed to continue competing. Widely out prior to the 2020 Games.
Bo Kramer	Netherlands	Wheelchair basketball	2016, 2020, 2024	1st place, gold medalist(s)	Widely out prior to the 2020 Games.
Robyn Love	Great Britain	Wheelchair basketball	2016, 2020, 2024		Widely out prior to the 2020 Games. In a relationship with teammate Laurie Williams.
Alana Maldonado	Brazil	Judo	2016, 2020, 2024	1st place, gold medalist(s) 2nd place, silver medalist(s)	Widely out prior to the 2020 Games. After winning gold in Tokyo, having taken silver at home in Rio, she told the media that she would not take off her gold medal until she got home and saw her girlfriend.
Ness Murby	Canada	Athletics	2016		The BBC noted that as a trans male athlete, their presence "created less of a stir" than trans female athletes.
Lauren Rowles	Great Britain	Rowing	2016, 2020, 2024	1st place, gold medalist(s)	Widely out prior to the 2020 Games, at which point she was in a relationship with wheelchair basketball player Judith Hamer.
Josie Aslakson	United States	Wheelchair basketball	2020, 2024	2nd place, silver medalist(s) 3rd place, bronze medalist(s)	Came out widely with her involvement in Ballin' Out ahead of the 2024 Games.
Nikki Ayers	Australia	Rowing	2020, 2024	1st place, gold medalist(s)	
Tuany Barbosa Siqueira	Brazil	Athletics	2020		A judoka before her impairment, Barbosa began training in para athletics throwing events at the encouragement of a former teammate.
Kaitlyn Eaton	United States	Wheelchair basketball	2020, 2024	2nd place, silver medalist(s) 3rd place, bronze medalist(s)	Widely out prior to competing.
Jardênia Félix	Brazil	Athletics	2020, 2024	3rd place, bronze medalist(s)	
Már Gunnarsson	Iceland	Swimming	2020, 2024		
Terry Hayes	United States	Wheelchair fencing	2020		Widely out prior to competing.
Querijn Hensen	Netherlands	Swimming	2020		
Robyn Lambird	Australia	Athletics	2020	3rd place, bronze medalist(s)	Lambird became the first non-binary Paralympic medallist. They said that, growing up playing sports around men, they never felt they had to hide their gender identity and never felt unwelcome within those circles, but has spoken of how the disabled queer community is marginalised. They use social media as an advocacy platform for their community.
Louis Lawlor	Great Britain	Swimming	2020, 2024		
Tara Llanes	Canada	Wheelchair basketball	2020, 2024		Widely out prior to competing.
Débora Menezes	Brazil	Parataekwondo	2020, 2024	2nd place, silver medalist(s)	Widely out prior to competing.
Kate O'Brien	Canada	Cycling	2020, 2024	2nd place, silver medalist(s) 3rd place, bronze medalist(s)	O'Brien took up bobsleigh in university, and got as far as qualifying for the 2014 Winter Olympics before an injury took her out of competition. In her time out, she was recruited to join the Canadian track cycling team as they prepared for the 2016 Summer Olympics, at which she competed. At a track cycling demonstration in 2017, O'Brien was involved in a major crash and suffered traumatic injury; Team Canada incorporated her into their Paralympic track cycling team for the 2020 Games. Widely out prior to the 2020 Games.
Brenda Osnaya	Mexico	Paratriathlon	2020, 2024		Widely out prior to competing. Osnaya has also competed in weightlifting, swimming and athletics as a para-athlete, and roller skating as an able-bodied athlete.
Marie Patouillet	France	Cycling	2020, 2024	1st place, gold medalist(s) 2nd place, silver medalist(s) 3rd place, bronze medalist(s)	
Dimitri Pavadé	France	Athletics	2020, 2024	2nd place, silver medalist(s)	Came out at the 2024 Games, after competing.
Patrícia Pereira	Brazil	Swimming	2020, 2024	2nd place, silver medalist(s) 3rd place, bronze medalist(s)	
Mariana Ribeiro	Brazil	Swimming	2020, 2024	3rd place, bronze medalist(s)	Widely out prior to competing.
Jaleen Roberts	United States	Athletics	2020, 2024	2nd place, silver medalist(s) 3rd place, bronze medalist(s)	
Lucy Robinson	Great Britain	Wheelchair basketball	2020, 2024		Widely out prior to competing.
Courtney Ryan	United States	Wheelchair basketball	2020, 2024	2nd place, silver medalist(s) 3rd place, bronze medalist(s)	Widely out prior to competing.
Monica Sereda	United States	Cycling	2020		Widely out prior to competing.
Hallie Smith	United States	Rowing	2020		Widely out prior to competing.
Maz Strong	Australia	Athletics	2020, 2024	3rd place, bronze medalist(s)	Strong was one of two out Australian non-binary para athletes at the 2020 Games.
Richael Timothy	Ireland	Cycling	2020, 2024		
Kevin van Ham	Belgium	Equestrian	2020, 2024		
Alexandra Viney	Australia	Rowing	2020, 2024		
Mateus de Assis Silva	Brazil	Powerlifting	2024		
Pauline Déroulède	France	Wheelchair tennis	2024		
Anu Francis	Australia	Paratriathlon	2024		
Trinity Lowthian	Canada	Wheelchair fencing	2024		
Suzana Nahirnei	Brazil	Athletics	2024		
Valentina Petrillo	Italy	Athletics	2024		Reported as the first openly transgender Paralympic athlete.
Christie Raleigh Crossley	United States	Swimming	2024	1st place, gold medalist(s) 2nd place, silver medalist(s) 3rd place, bronze medalist(s)	Raleigh Crossley is non-binary.
Greg Slade	Great Britain	Wheelchair tennis	2024	2nd place, silver medalist(s)	
Hailey Griffin	United States	Alpine skiing	2026		
Jackie Hamwey	United States	Snowboard	2026		
Michael O'Hearn	United States	Alpine skiing	2026		

== See also ==
- List of LGBT sportspeople

== Sources ==
- Avery, Dan (22 August 2021a). "Tokyo Paralympic Games Welcomes Record Number of LGBTQ Athletes". NBC News.
- Daley, Jillian (3 August 2012). "Oregon Live". The Oregonian.
- Ferrendi, Brittany (7 September 2016). "Meet USA's Openly LGBT Paralympians". South Florida Gay News.
- Lima, Josiane (18 May 2021). "Dia internacional de combate à lgbtfobia. #lovewins #loveislove #rowtotokyo #tokyo2020 #paralympics". Instagram.
- Morgan, Joe (27 August 2012). "Meet the Openly Gay Paralympians". Gay Star News.
- Outsports (17 August 2021b). "At Least 36 Out LGBTQ Paralympians are Competing in Tokyo, by far a record".
- Staff (9 August 2021). "Seven-time Paralympian Jen Armbruster reminisces about her time in Olympic Stadiums". NBC Sports. Archived from the original on August 9, 2021.
- Swim Ontario (13 March 2017). "In Memoriam: Rafael Polinario".
- World Rowing (30 July 2020). "Josiane Lima has competed at every Paralympic Games that's had rowing. And she's still competing today". Twitter.
- Zeigler, Cyd (26 July 2012). "Over 100 out LGBT Athletes Have Competed in the Summer Olympics". Outsports.
- Zeigler, Cyd (7 September 2016b). "Out Team USA Paralympic flagbearer Allison Jones". Outsports.
- Zeigler, Cyd (13 September 2016d). "Already three individual medals for out LGBT Paralympians in Rio". Outsports.
- Zeigler, Cyd (10 March 2018). "At least one out LGBTQ Paralympian is competing in Pyeongchang". Outsports.
- Zeigler, Cyd (7 May 2020c). "This athlete struggled through depression to win gold in Rio". Outsports.
- Zeigler, Cyd (18 August 2021c). "Paralympian Monique Matthews' husband is transitioning, and they can use your help". Outsports.
- Zeigler, Cyd (23 August 2021d). "2 Out LGBTQ Flag Bearers March at the Paralympics Opening Ceremony". Outsports.
- Zeigler, Cyd (30 August 2021f). "Alana Maldonado won't take off her gold medal until she sees her girlfriend". Outsports.
