= 2018 World Rowing Championships – PR2 Women's single sculls =

PR2 Women's single sculls at the 2018 World Rowing Championships
- Venue: Plovdiv Regatta Venue
- Location: Plovdiv, Bulgaria
- Dates: 14 September
- Competitors: 6 from 6 nations
- Winning time: 9:39.73

Medalists
gold medal	Perle Bouge	France
silver medal	Annika van der Meer	Netherlands
bronze medal	Jolanta Majka	Poland

The PR2 women's single sculls competition at the 2018 World Rowing Championships in Plovdiv took place at the Plovdiv Regatta Venue.

== Schedule ==
The schedule was as follows:

Date	Time	Round
Friday 14 September 2018	11:17	Final

All times are Eastern European Summer Time (UTC+3)

== Results ==
With fewer than seven entries in this event, a direct final was held to determine the rankings.

Rank	Rower	Country	Time
1st place, gold medalist(s)	Perle Bouge	France	9:39.73
2nd place, silver medalist(s)	Annika van der Meer	Netherlands	9:45.52
3rd place, bronze medalist(s)	Jolanta Majka	Poland	9:58.52
4	Svitlana Bohuslavska	Ukraine	10:12.90
5	Josiane Lima	Brazil	10:45.18
6	Laura Goodkind	United States	10:46.38
