= Rowing at the 2016 Summer Paralympics – Mixed double sculls =

Mixed Double sculls at the XV Paralympic Games
- Venue: Rodrigo de Freitas Lagoon
- Date: 9 September – 11 September 2016
- Competitors: 24 from 12 nations

Medalists
1st place, gold medalist(s)		Lauren Rowles; Laurence Whiteley	Great Britain
2nd place, silver medalist(s)		Liu Shuang; Fei Tianming	China
3rd place, bronze medalist(s)		Perle Bouge; Stephane Tardieu	France

The mixed double sculls competition at the 2016 Summer Paralympics in Rio de Janeiro took place at Rodrigo de Freitas Lagoon.

== Results ==
=== Heats ===
The winner of each heat qualified to the finals, remainder to the repechage.

==== Heat 1 ====
Rank	Rowers	Country	Time	Notes
1	Perle Bouge; Stephane Tardieu	France	3:59.32	Q
2	Esther van der Loos; Corné de Koning	Netherlands	4:03.07	R
3	Michel Pessanha; Josiane Lima	Brazil	4:04.26	R
4	Michal Gadowski; Jolanta Majka	Poland	4:08.02	R
5	Laura Goodkind; Helman Roman	United States	4:33.58	R
6	Shigeru Komazaki; Rie Ariyoshi	Japan	4:51.28	R

==== Heat 2 ====
Rank	Rowers	Country	Time	Notes
1	Lauren Rowles; Laurence Whiteley	Great Britain	3:52.16WB	Q
2	Liu Shuang; Fei Tianming	China	3:54.70	R
3	Iaroslav Koiuda; Iryna Kyrychenko	Ukraine	4:01.05	R
4	Gavin Bellis; Kathryn Ross	Australia	4:03.25	R
5	Yuliya Chernoy; Reuven Magnagey	Israel	4:20.62	R
6	Zanna Cveckovska; Eduards Pupels	Latvia	4:36.95	R

=== Repechages ===
First two of each repechage qualified to the medal final, remainder to Final B.

==== Repechage 1 ====
Rank	Rowers	Country	Time	Notes
1	Esther van der Loos; Corné de Koning	Netherlands	4:05.70	Q
2	Michal Gadowski; Jolanta Majka	Poland	4:07.25	Q
3	Gavin Bellis; Kathryn Ross	Australia	4:08.57	Final B
4	Shigeru Komazaki; Rie Ariyoshi	Japan	4:52.37	Final B
5	Zanna Cveckovska; Eduards Pupels	Latvia	4:41.33	Final B, Boat under weight

==== Repechage 2 ====
Rank	Rowers	Country	Time	Notes
1	Liu Shuang; Fei Tianming	China	4:01.00	Q
2	Iaroslav Koiuda; Iryna Kyrychenko	Ukraine	4:04.42	Q
3	Michel Pessanha; Josiane Lima	Brazil	4:04.52	Final B
4	Yuliya Chernoy; Reuven Magnagey	Israel	4:28.60	Final B
5	Laura Goodkind; Helman Roman	United States	4:34.18	Final B

=== Finals ===
==== Final A ====
Rank	Rowers	Country	Time
1st place, gold medalist(s)	Lauren Rowles; Laurence Whiteley	Great Britain	3:55.28
2nd place, silver medalist(s)	Liu Shuang; Fei Tianming	China	3:58.45
3rd place, bronze medalist(s)	Perle Bouge; Stephane Tardieu	France	4:01.48
4	Esther van der Loos; Corné de Koning	Netherlands	4:03.43
5	Iaroslav Koiuda; Iryna Kyrychenko	Ukraine	4:05.35
6	Michal Gadowski; Jolanta Majka	Poland	4:06.26

==== Final B ====
Rank	Rowers	Country	Time
1	Michel Pessanha; Josiane Lima	Brazil	4:03.13
2	Gavin Bellis; Kathryn Ross	Australia	4:05.61
3	Yuliya Chernoy; Reuven Magnagey	Israel	4:21.23
4	Laura Goodkind; Helman Roman	United States	4:30.07
5	Zanna Cveckovska; Eduards Pupels	Latvia	4:32.39
6	Shigeru Komazaki; Rie Ariyoshi	Japan	4:46.81
