= 2018 World Rowing Championships – PR2 Mixed double sculls =

PR2 Mixed double sculls at the 2018 World Rowing Championships
- Venue: Plovdiv Regatta Venue
- Location: Plovdiv, Bulgaria
- Dates: 15 September
- Competitors: 12 from 6 nations
- Winning time: 8:07.92

Medalists
gold medal	Annika van der Meer; Corne de Koning	Netherlands
silver medal	Michał Gadowski; Jolanta Majka	Poland
bronze medal	Svitlana Bohuslavska; Iaroslav Koiuda	Ukraine

The PR2 mixed double sculls competition at the 2018 World Rowing Championships in Plovdiv took place at the Plovdiv Regatta Venue.

== Schedule ==
The schedule was as follows:

Date	Time	Round
Saturday 15 September 2018	11:03	Final

All times are Eastern European Summer Time (UTC+3)

== Results ==
With fewer than seven entries in this event, a direct final was held to determine the rankings.

Rank	Rowers	Country	Time	Notes
1st place, gold medalist(s)	Annika van der Meer; Corne de Koning	Netherlands	8:07.92	WCHB
2nd place, silver medalist(s)	Michał Gadowski; Jolanta Majka	Poland	8:12.60	
3rd place, bronze medalist(s)	Svitlana Bohuslavska; Iaroslav Koiuda	Ukraine	8:20.61	
4	Josiane Lima; Michel Pessanha	Brazil	8:37.99	
5	Žanna Cvečkovska; Eduards Pupels	Latvia	9:20.88	
6	Ronald Harvey; Laura Goodkind	United States	9:29.80	
