= Rowing at the 2024 Summer Paralympics – PR2Mix2x =

PR2 Mixed double sculls at the XVII Paralympic Games
- Venue: Vaires-sur-Marne Nautical Stadium
- Date: 30 August – 1 September 2024
- Competitors: 18 from 9 nations
- Winning time: 8:20.97

Medalists
1st place, gold medalist(s)		Lauren Rowles; Gregg Stevenson	Great Britain
2nd place, silver medalist(s)		Liu Shuang; Jiang Jijian	China
3rd place, bronze medalist(s)		Shahar Milfelder; Saleh Shahin	Israel

The PR2 mixed double sculls competition at the 2024 Summer Paralympics in Paris took place at the Vaires-sur-Marne Nautical Stadium.

== Results ==
=== Heats ===
The first two of each heat qualified to the finals, the remainder went to the repechage.

==== Heat 1 ====
Rank	Lane	Rower	Nation	Time	Notes
1	3	Liu Shuang; Jiang Jijian	China	8:03.70	FA, PB
2	4	Shahar Milfelder; Saleh Shahin	Israel	8:07.24	FA
3	2	Anna Aisanova; Iaroslav Koiuda	Ukraine	8:43.38	R
4	5	Tiarnan O'Donnell; Katie O'Brien	Ireland	9:03.33	R
5	1	Nurşen Şen; Yiğit Doğukan Bozkurt	Turkey	9:28.00	R

==== Heat 2 ====
Rank	Lane	Rower	Nation	Time	Notes
1	4	Lauren Rowles; Gregg Stevenson	Great Britain	7:56.92	FA, WB
2	3	Jolanta Majka; Michał Gadowski	Poland	8:07.76	FA
3	2	Benjamin Daviet; Perle Bouge	France	8:10.40	R
4	1	Esther van der Loos; Corné de Koning	Netherlands	8:19.21	R

=== Repechage ===
The first two of the heat qualified to the finals, the remainder went to Final B.

Rank	Lane	Rower	Nation	Time	Notes
1	2	Benjamin Daviet; Perle Bouge	France	8:29.61	FA
2	3	Anna Aisanova; Iaroslav Koiuda	Ukraine	8:30.81	FA
3	4	Esther van der Loos; Corné de Koning	Netherlands	8:33.73	FB
4	1	Tiarnan O'Donnell; Katie O'Brien	Ireland	8:40.85	FB
5	1	Nurşen Şen; Yiğit Doğukan Bozkurt	Turkey	9:50.70	FB

=== Finals ===
==== Final B ====
Rank	Lane	Rower	Nation	Time	Notes
7	2	Esther van der Loos; Corné de Koning	Netherlands	8:42.73	
8	3	Tiarnan O'Donnell; Katie O'Brien	Ireland	8:50.16	
9	1	Nurşen Şen; Yiğit Doğukan Bozkurt	Turkey	10:01.19	

==== Final A ====
Rank	Lane	Rower	Nation	Time	Notes
1st place, gold medalist(s)	3	Lauren Rowles; Gregg Stevenson	Great Britain	8:20.97	
2nd place, silver medalist(s)	4	Liu Shuang; Jiang Jijian	China	8:23.45	
3rd place, bronze medalist(s)	5	Shahar Milfelder; Saleh Shahin	Israel	8:31.85	
4	1	Anna Aisanova; Iaroslav Koiuda	Ukraine	8:43.22	
5	6	Benjamin Daviet; Perle Bouge	France	8:47.64	
6	2	Jolanta Majka; Michał Gadowski	Poland	8:52.24	
