= 2025 World Rowing Championships – PR2 Mixed double sculls =

PR2 Mixed double sculls at the 2025 World Rowing Championships
- Venue: Dianshan Lake
- Location: Shanghai, China
- Dates: 24–27 September
- Competitors: 18 from 9 nations
- Winning time: 8:07.75

Medalists
gold medal	Liu Shuang; Jiang Jijian	China
silver medal	Jasmina Bier; Paul Umbach	Germany
bronze medal	Shahar Milfelder; Saleh Shahin	Israel

The PR2 mixed double sculls competition at the 2025 World Rowing Championships took place at Dianshan Lake, in Shanghai.

== Schedule ==
The schedule was as follows:

Date	Time	Round
Wednesday, 24 2025	10:06	Heats
Saturday, 27 September 2025	13:05	Final B
Saturday, 27 September 2025	14:05	Final A

All times are UTC+08:00

== Results ==
=== Heats ===
The two fastest boats in each heat and the two fastest times advanced directly to Final A. The remaining boats were sent to Final B.

==== Heat 1 ====
Rank	Rower	Country	Time	Notes
1	Liu Shuang; Jiang Jijian	China	8:20.63	FA
2	Shahar Milfelder; Saleh Shahin	Israel	8:35.06	FA
3	Michel Gomes Pessanha; Gessyca Guerra	Brazil	8:45.41	FA
4	Mukhayyo Abdusattorova; Diyorbek Boybolsinov	Uzbekistan	8:55.44	FB
5	Miguel Ángel Nieto Carpio; Liliana Gallo Flores	Mexico	9:04.61	FB

==== Heat 2 ====
Rank	Rower	Country	Time	Notes
1	Jasmina Bier; Paul Umbach	Germany	8:29.13	FA
2	Anna Aisanova; Iaroslav Koiuda	Ukraine	8:37.80	FA
3	Perle Bouge; Alexis Sánchez	France	8:49.39	FA
4	Sadhbh Ni Laoghaire; Tiarnán O'Donnell	Ireland	9:09.88	FB

=== Finals ===
The A final determined the rankings for places 1 to 6. Additional rankings were determined in the other finals.

==== Final B ====
Rank	Rower	Country	Time	Total rank
1	Mukhayyo Abdusattorova; Diyorbek Boybolsinov	Uzbekistan	8:40.42	7
2	Miguel Ángel Nieto Carpio; Liliana Gallo Flores	Mexico	8:57.78	8
3	Sadhbh Ni Laoghaire; Tiarnán O'Donnell	Ireland	9:00.35	9

==== Final A ====
Rank	Rower	Country	Time	Notes
1st place, gold medalist(s)	Liu Shuang; Jiang Jijian	China	8:07.75	
2nd place, silver medalist(s)	Jasmina Bier; Paul Umbach	Germany	8:15.58	
3rd place, bronze medalist(s)	Shahar Milfelder; Saleh Shahin	Israel	8:17.15	
4	Perle Bouge; Alexis Sánchez	France	8:33.91	
5	Michel Gomes Pessanha; Gessyca Guerra	Brazil	8:43.34	
6	Anna Aisanova; Iaroslav Koiuda	Ukraine	8:56.85	
