= 2026 World Rowing Championships – PR2 Mixed double sculls =

PR2 Mixed double sculls at the 2026 World Rowing Championships
- Venue: Bosbaan
- Location: Amsterdam, Netherlands
- Dates: 25–27 August
- Competitors: 20 from 10 nations
- Winning time: 8:08.26

Medalists
gold medal	Jasmina Bier; Paul Umbach	Germany
silver medal	Liu Shuang; Jiang Jijian	China
bronze medal	Shahar Milfelder; Saleh Shahin	Israel

The PR2 mixed double sculls competition at the 2026 World Rowing Championships took place at Bosbaan, in Amsterdam.

== Schedule ==
The schedule was as follows:

Date	Time	Round
Tuesday 25 August 2026	14:05	Heats
Thursday, 27 August 2026	14:56	Final B
Thursday, 27 August 2026	18:20	Final A

All times are Central European Summer Time (UTC+2)

== Results ==
=== Heats ===
The two fastest boats in each heat and the two fastest times advanced to the Final A. Other crews to Final B.

==== Heat 1 ====
Rank	Rower	Country	Time	Notes
1	Liu Shuang; Jiang Jijian	China	9:25.41	FA
2	Shahar Milfelder; Saleh Shahin	Israel	9:26.40	FA
3	Natalie Vorel; Chance Quarry	United States	9:44.10	FA
4	Gessyca Guerra; Michel Gomes Pessanha	Brazil	10:08.39	FB
5	Victor Alexis Valencia Salinas; Ángeles Britani Gutiérrez Vieyra	Mexico	11:36.58	FB

==== Heat 2 ====
Rank	Rower	Country	Time	Notes
1	Jasmina Bier; Paul Umbach	Germany	9:17.44	FA
2	Mukhayyo Abdusattorova; Diyorbek Boybolsinov	Uzbekistan	9:22.80	FA
3	Anna Aisanova; Iaroslav Koiuda	Ukraine	9:31.09	FA
4	Ilenia Colanero; Daniele Stefanoni	Italy	9:46.28	FB
5	Merve Sezer; Yiğit Doğukan Bozkurt	Turkey	10:17.80	FB

=== Finals ===
The A final determined the rankings for places 1 to 6. Additional rankings were determined in the other finals.

==== Final B ====
Rank	Rower	Country	Time	Total rank
1	Gessyca Guerra; Michel Gomes Pessanha	Brazil	9:23.79	7
2	Ilenia Colanero; Daniele Stefanoni	Italy	9:30.01	8
3	Merve Sezer; Yiğit Doğukan Bozkurt	Turkey	9:57.55	9
4	Victor Alexis Valencia Salinas; Ángeles Britani Gutiérrez Vieyra	Mexico	10:52.17	10

==== Final A ====
Rank	Rower	Country	Time
1st place, gold medalist(s)	Jasmina Bier; Paul Umbach	Germany	8:08.26
2nd place, silver medalist(s)	Liu Shuang; Jiang Jijian	China	8:09.24
3rd place, bronze medalist(s)	Shahar Milfelder; Saleh Shahin	Israel	8:14.46
4	Mukhayyo Abdusattorova; Diyorbek Boybolsinov	Uzbekistan	8:17.10
5	Anna Aisanova; Iaroslav Koiuda	Ukraine	8:18.30
6	Natalie Vorel; Chance Quarry	United States	8:34.53
