= 2017 World Rowing Championships – PR2 Mixed double sculls =

PR2 Mixed double sculls at the 2017 World Rowing Championships
- Venue: Nathan Benderson Park
- Location: Sarasota, United States
- Dates: 28–30 September
- Competitors: 12 from 6 nations
- Winning time: 8:11.00

Medalists
| gold medal | Annika van der Meer; Corne de Koning | Netherlands |
| silver medal | Iaroslav Koiuda; Iryna Kyrychenko | Ukraine |
| bronze medal | Michał Gadowski; Jolanta Majka | Poland |

The PR2 mixed double sculls competition at the 2017 World Rowing Championships in Sarasota took place in Nathan Benderson Park.

== Schedule ==
The schedule was as follows:

| Date | Time | Round |
|---|---|---|
| Thursday 28 September 2017 | 09:10 | Exhibition race |
| Saturday 30 September 2017 | 09:55 | Final |

All times are Eastern Daylight Time (UTC-4)

== Results ==
=== Exhibition race ===
With fewer than seven entries in this event, boats contested a race for lanes before the final.

| Rank | Rowers | Country | Time | Notes |
|---|---|---|---|---|
| 1 | Annika van der Meer; Corne de Koning | Netherlands | 8:20.43 | WCHB |
| 2 | Iaroslav Koiuda; Iryna Kyrychenko | Ukraine | 8:36.86 | |
| 3 | Michał Gadowski; Jolanta Majka | Poland | 8:44.85 | |
| 4 | Liu Shuang; Fei Tianming | China | 9:08.39 | |
| 5 | Laura Goodkind; Isaac French | United States | 9:18.60 | |
| 6 | Eduards Pupels; Žanna Cvečkovska | Latvia | 9:51.56 | |

=== Final ===
The final determined the rankings.

| Rank | Rowers | Country | Time | Notes |
|---|---|---|---|---|
| 1st place, gold medalist(s) | Annika van der Meer; Corne de Koning | Netherlands | 8:11.00 | WCHB |
| 2nd place, silver medalist(s) | Iaroslav Koiuda; Iryna Kyrychenko | Ukraine | 8:28.71 | |
| 3rd place, bronze medalist(s) | Michał Gadowski; Jolanta Majka | Poland | 8:29.77 | |
| 4 | Liu Shuang; Fei Tianming | China | 8:53.54 | |
| 5 | Laura Goodkind; Isaac French | United States | 8:56.17 | |
| 6 | Eduards Pupels; Žanna Cvečkovska | Latvia | 9:37.95 | |
