= 2018 World Rowing Championships – PR2 Men's single sculls =

PR2 Men's single sculls at the 2018 World Rowing Championships
- Venue: Plovdiv Regatta Venue
- Location: Plovdiv, Bulgaria
- Dates: 10–14 September
- Competitors: 11 from 11 nations
- Winning time: 8:35.89

Medalists
| gold medal | Corne de Koning | Netherlands |
| silver medal | Jeremy Hall | Canada |
| bronze medal | Daniele Stefanoni | Brazil |

The PR2 men's single sculls competition at the 2018 World Rowing Championships in Plovdiv took place at the Plovdiv Regatta Venue.

== Schedule ==
The schedule was as follows:

| Date | Time | Round |
|---|---|---|
| Monday 10 September 2018 | 09:46 | Heats |
| Wednesday 12 September 2018 | 10:22 | Repechages |
| Friday 14 September 2018 | 10:57 | Final A |
| Friday 14 September 2018 | 14:55 | Final B |

All times are Eastern European Summer Time (UTC+3)

== Results ==
=== Heats ===
Heat winners advanced directly to the A final. The remaining boats were sent to the repechages.

==== Heat 1 ====
| Rank | Rowers | Country | Time | Notes |
|---|---|---|---|---|
| 1 | Laurence Whiteley | Great Britain | 8:43.71 | FA |
| 2 | Daniele Stefanoni | Italy | 8:52.08 | R |
| 3 | Jeremy Hall | Canada | 9:07.03 | R |
| 4 | Michel Pessanha | Brazil | 9:14.87 | R |
| 5 | Jorge Pineda | Spain | 9:51.38 | R |
| 6 | Shigeru Komazaki | Japan | 10:16.71 | R |

==== Heat 2 ====
| Rank | Rowers | Country | Time | Notes |
|---|---|---|---|---|
| 1 | Corne de Koning | Netherlands | 8:35.44 | FA, WB |
| 2 | Michał Gadowski | Poland | 9:22.59 | R |
| 3 | Marcus Klemp | Germany | 9:45.44 | R |
| 4 | Andrei Rogachev | Russia | 9:54.43 | R |
| 5 | Eduards Pupels | Latvia | 10:42.93 | R |

=== Repechages ===
The two fastest boats in each repechage advanced to the A final. The remaining boats were sent to the B final.

==== Repechage 1 ====
| Rank | Rowers | Country | Time | Notes |
|---|---|---|---|---|
| 1 | Daniele Stefanoni | Italy | 8:58.64 | FA |
| 2 | Michel Pessanha | Brazil | 9:07.46 | FA |
| 3 | Marcus Klemp | Germany | 9:49.44 | FB |
| 4 | Shigeru Komazaki | Japan | 10:23.13 | FB |
| 5 | Eduards Pupels | Latvia | 10:46.73 | FB |

==== Repechage 2 ====
| Rank | Rowers | Country | Time | Notes |
|---|---|---|---|---|
| 1 | Jeremy Hall | Canada | 8:51.45 | FA |
| 2 | Michał Gadowski | Poland | 8:59.50 | FA |
| 3 | Jorge Pineda | Spain | 9:31.19 | FB |
| 4 | Andrei Rogachev | Russia | 9:45.31 | FB |

=== Finals ===
The A final determined the rankings for places 1 to 6. Additional rankings were determined in the B final.

==== Final B ====
| Rank | Rowers | Country | Time |
|---|---|---|---|
| 1 | Marcus Klemp | Germany | 9:49.80 |
| 2 | Jorge Pineda | Spain | 9:59.66 |
| 3 | Andrei Rogachev | Russia | 10:09.70 |
| 4 | Shigeru Komazaki | Japan | 10:48.26 |
| 5 | Eduards Pupels | Latvia | 10:57.32 |

==== Final A ====
| Rank | Rowers | Country | Time |
|---|---|---|---|
| 1st place, gold medalist(s) | Corne de Koning | Netherlands | 8:35.89 |
| 2nd place, silver medalist(s) | Jeremy Hall | Canada | 8:42.46 |
| 3rd place, bronze medalist(s) | Daniele Stefanoni | Italy | 8:52.08 |
| 4 | Laurence Whiteley | Great Britain | 8:59.00 |
| 5 | Michel Pessanha | Brazil | 9:04.34 |
| 6 | Michał Gadowski | Poland | 9:15.25 |
