= 2019 World Rowing Championships – PR3 Mixed double sculls =

PR3 Mixed double sculls at the 2019 World Rowing Championships
- Venue: Linz-Ottensheim
- Location: Ottensheim, Austria
- Dates: 28–30 August
- Competitors: 12 from 6 nations
- Winning time: 7:48.32

Medalists
gold medal	Valentina Zhagot; Evgenii Borisov	Russia
silver medal	Johanna Beyer; David Erkinger	Austria
bronze medal	Joshua Boissoneau; Pearl Outlaw	United States

The PR3 mixed double sculls competition at the 2019 World Rowing Championships took place at the Linz-Ottensheim regatta venue.

== Schedule ==
The schedule was as follows:

Date	Time	Round
Wednesday 28 August 2019	10:08	Test race
Friday 30 August 2019	15:19	Final

All times are Central European Summer Time (UTC+2)

== Results ==
=== Test race ===
With fewer than seven entries in this event, boats contested a race for lanes before the final.

Rank	Rowers	Country	Time
1	Valentina Zhagot; Evgenii Borisov	Russia	7:50.54
2	Johanna Beyer; David Erkinger	Austria	8:00.46
3	Joshua Boissoneau; Pearl Outlaw	United States	8:15.77
4	Wang Xixi; Chen Xinxin	China	8:19.70
5	Saleh Shahin; Shay-Lee Mizrachi	Israel	8:26.09
6	Maryam Afgei; Gianfilippo Mirabile	Italy	8:36.35

=== Final ===
The final determined the rankings.

Rank	Rowers	Country	Time
1st place, gold medalist(s)	Valentina Zhagot; Evgenii Borisov	Russia	7:48.32
2nd place, silver medalist(s)	Johanna Beyer; David Erkinger	Austria	8:01.12
3rd place, bronze medalist(s)	Joshua Boissoneau; Pearl Outlaw	United States	8:17.51
4	Wang Xixi; Chen Xinxin	China	8:22.95
5	Saleh Shahin; Shay-Lee Mizrachi	Israel	8:30.70
6	Maryam Afgei; Gianfilippo Mirabile	Italy	8:49.62
