= 2022 World Rowing Championships – PR2 Mixed double sculls =

PR2 Mixed double sculls at the 2022 World Rowing Championships
- Venue: Labe aréna
- Location: Račice, Czech Republic
- Dates: 20 September – 24 September
- Competitors: 18 from 9 nations
- Winning time: 8:24.47

Medalists
gold medal	Svitlana Bohuslavska; Iaroslav Koiuda	Ukraine
silver medal	Jolanta Majka; Michał Gadowski	Poland
bronze medal	Perle Bouge; Stéphane Tardieu	France

The PR2 mixed double sculls competition at the 2022 World Rowing Championships took place at the Račice regatta venue.

== Schedule ==
The schedule was as follows:

Date	Time	Round
Tuesday 20 September 2022	10:20	Heats
Thursday 22 September 2022	09:30	Repechage
Saturday 24 September 2022	11:30	Final B
Saturday 24 September 2022	13:05	Final A

All times are Central European Summer Time (UTC+2)

== Results ==
=== Heats ===
The two fastest boats in each heat advanced directly to the Final A. The remaining boats were sent to the repechages.

==== Heat 1 ====
Rank	Rower	Country	Time	Notes
1	Svitlana Bohuslavska; Iaroslav Koiuda	Ukraine	8:25.21	FA
2	Chantal Haenen; Corné de Koning	Netherlands	8:27.23	FA
3	Katie O'Brien; Steven McGowan	Ireland	8:29.16	R
4	Josiane Dias de Lima; Leandro Sagaz	Brazil	9:05.25	R
5	Miguel Nieto; Ángeles Gutiérrez	Mexico	BUW	R

==== Heat 2 ====
Rank	Rower	Country	Time	Notes
1	Jolanta Majka; Michał Gadowski	Poland	8:26.79	FA
2	Perle Bouge; Stéphane Tardieu	France	8:30.85	FA
3	Leopold Reimann; Sylvia Pille-Steppat	Germany	9:02.48	R
4	Feruza Buriboeva; Otabek Kuchkorov	Uzbekistan	BUW	R

=== Repechage ===
The two fastest boats in heat advanced to the Final A. The remaining boats were sent to the Final B.

Rank	Rower	Country	Time	Notes
1	Feruza Buriboeva; Otabek Kuchkorov	Uzbekistan	8:48.27	FA
2	Katie O'Brien; Steven McGowan	Ireland	8:52.28	FA
3	Leopold Reimann; Sylvia Pille-Steppat	Germany	9:07.09	FB
4	Miguel Nieto; Ángeles Gutiérrez	Mexico	9:07.20	FB
5	Josiane Dias de Lima; Leandro Sagaz	Brazil	9:11.43	FB

=== Finals ===
The A final determined the rankings for places 1 to 6. Additional rankings were determined in the other finals.

==== Final B ====
Rank	Rower	Country	Time	Total rank
1	Josiane Dias de Lima; Leandro Sagaz	Brazil	8:48.44	7
2	Leopold Reimann; Sylvia Pille-Steppat	Germany	8:50.79	8
3	Miguel Nieto; Ángeles Gutiérrez	Mexico	8:52.27	9

==== Final A ====
Rank	Rower	Country	Time	Notes
1st place, gold medalist(s)	Svitlana Bohuslavska; Iaroslav Koiuda	Ukraine	8:24.47	
2nd place, silver medalist(s)	Jolanta Majka; Michał Gadowski	Poland	8:26.95	
3rd place, bronze medalist(s)	Perle Bouge; Stéphane Tardieu	France	8:28.81	
4	Chantal Haenen; Corné de Koning	Netherlands	8:34.60	
5	Katie O'Brien; Steven McGowan	Ireland	8:36.50	
6	Feruza Buriboeva; Otabek Kuchkorov	Uzbekistan	8:38.63	
