= Gregg Stevenson =

British Paralympic rower

Gregg Stevenson MBE
Personal information
- Born: 9 September 1984 (age 41)

Sport
- Sport: Para-rowing
- Disability class: PR2
Medal record
Men's para-rowing
Representing Great Britain
Paralympic Games
Gold medal – first place	2024 Paris	PR2 mixed double sculls
World Championships
Gold medal – first place	2023 Belgrade	PR2 mixed double sculls
European Championships
Gold medal – first place	2023 Bled	PR2 mixed double sculls

Gregg Stevenson MBE (born 9 September 1984) is a British rower, who won gold in the PR2 mixed double sculls at the 2024 Summer Paralympics in Paris.
