= 2022 World Rowing Championships – PR2 Men's single sculls =

PR2 Men's single sculls at the 2022 World Rowing Championships
- Venue: Labe aréna
- Location: Račice, Czech Republic
- Dates: 19 September – 23 September
- Competitors: 6 from 6 nations
- Winning time: 8:52.37

Medalists
gold medal	Corné de Koning	Netherlands
silver medal	Gian Filippo Mirabile	Italy
bronze medal	Paul Umbach	Germany

The PR2 men's single sculls competition at the 2022 World Rowing Championships took place at the Račice regatta venue.

== Schedule ==
The schedule was as follows:

Date	Time	Round
Monday 19 September 2022	09:30	Heats
Friday 23 September 2022	13:05	Final A

All times are Central European Summer Time (UTC+2)

== Results ==
All boats advanced directly to Final A.

=== Heat ===
Rank	Rower	Country	Time	Notes
1	Corné de Koning	Netherlands	8:50.66	FA
2	Gian Filippo Mirabile	Italy	8:57.53	FA
3	Russell Gernaat	United States	9:25.02	FA
4	Otabek Kuchkorov	Uzbekistan	9:30.34	FA
5	Paul Umbach	Germany	9:31.28	FA
6	Beñat Odriozola	Spain	9:40.60	FA

=== Final A ===
The final determined the rankings.

Rank	Rower	Country	Time	Notes
1st place, gold medalist(s)	Corné de Koning	Netherlands	8:52.37	
2nd place, silver medalist(s)	Gian Filippo Mirabile	Italy	9:03.33	
3rd place, bronze medalist(s)	Paul Umbach	Germany	9:21.12	
4	Otabek Kuchkorov	Uzbekistan	9:21.25	
5	Russell Gernaat	United States	9:24.31	
6	Beñat Odriozola	Spain	9:49.04	
