= K.S.R.V. Njord =

Dutch rowing club

- Koninklijke Studenten Roeivereeningen "Njord"
- Location: Leiden, The Netherlands
- Founded: 1874
- Website: njord.nl

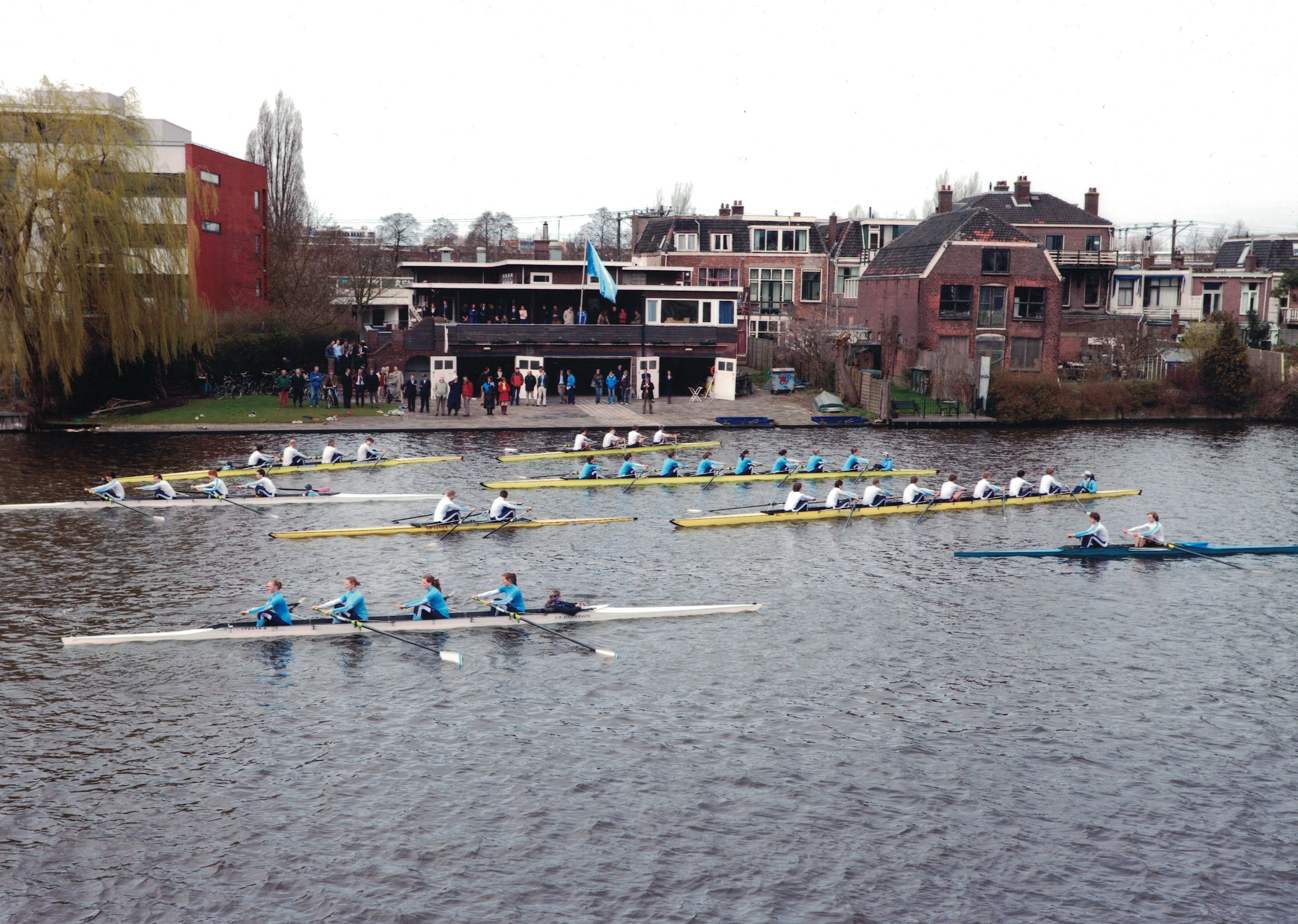
Njord members rowing the Galgewater

The Royal Student Rowing Association (K.S.R.V.) Njord (Dutch: Koninklijke Studenten Roeivereeniging (K.S.R.V.) Njord) is a Dutch rowing club, founded in 1874. It is the oldest student rowing club in the Netherlands.

== History ==
The K.S.R.V. Njord was founded on June 5, 1874, by members of the Leiden Student Corps.

The rowing club enjoyed early support from the Dutch royal family. Immediately after the founding of Njord in 1874, Prince Henry, the third son of William II of the Netherlands, became a patron of the club.

In 1878, Njord and Laga raced the first edition of the Varsity, the oldest and considered to be the most prestigious student rowing competition in the Netherlands.

During the World War II, the club, alongside Leiden University, was shut down by German occupying forces.

Until 1971, only men could be members. In 1971, Njord opened up membership to both genders, coinciding with the merging of Asopos and De Vliet, two local men's and women's rowing clubs, respectively

In 1976, Njord was a founding participant of the Ringvaart Regatta, a rowing competition consisting of a course measuring 100 kilometers (approximately 62 miles) in distance.

== Notable people ==
- Annika van der Meer – Dutch Paralympic silver medalist (2020), PR2 mixed double sculls
- Erik Hazelhoff Roelfzema – Dutch resistance fighter during WWII
- Ernst de Jonge – Dutch Olympian and resistance operative during WWII
- Harald Punt - Dutch 3x silver medal winner at the world championships (1x single skulls; 2x double sculls)
- Jacobine Veenhoven – Dutch Olympic bronze medalist (2012), women's eight
- Maxime Verhagen – Former Deputy Prime Minister of the Netherlands
- Meinoud Rost van Tonningen – Dutch national socialist politician and wartime collaborator
- Nicole Beukers – Dutch Olympic silver medalist (2016), women's quadruple sculls
- Prince Henry of the Netherlands – early patron
- Stef Broenink – Dutch Olympic silver medalist (2020), men's double sculls
