= Beit Yitzhak-Sha'ar Hefer =

Moshav in central Israel

Beit Yitzhak-Sha'ar Hefer: בֵּית יִצְחָק־שַׁעַר חֵפֶר (Hebrew); بيت يتسحاك-شاعر حيفر (Arabic)
- Location within Central Israel Location within Israel
- Coordinates: 32°19′40″N 34°53′19″E
- Country: Israel
- District: Central
- Subdistrict: HaSharon
- Council: Hefer Yalley
- Affiliation: Agricultural Union
- Founded: 1939
- Founder: German Jews
- Population (2024): 2,299
- Website: www.beit-yitzhak.org.il

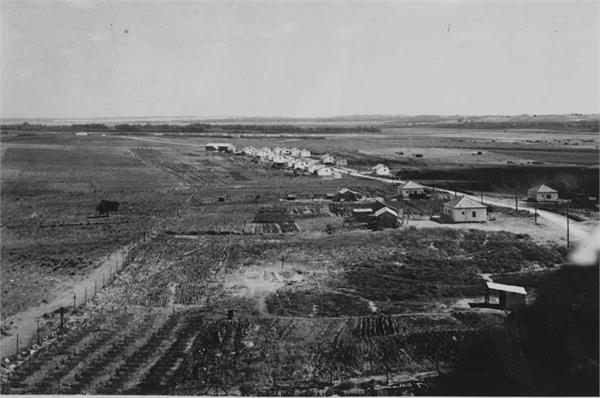
Nira 1945

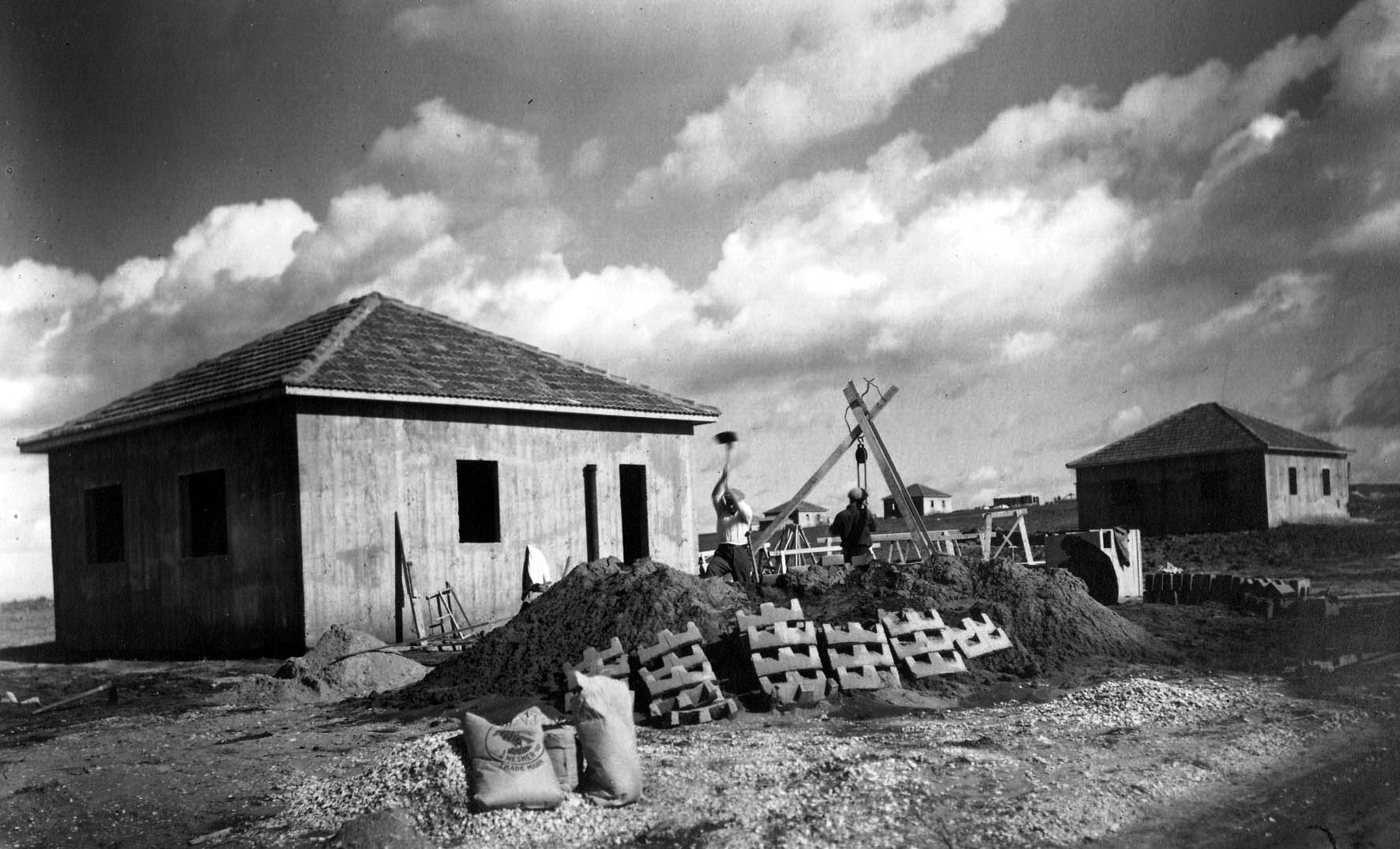
Moshav Beit Yitzhak in 1940

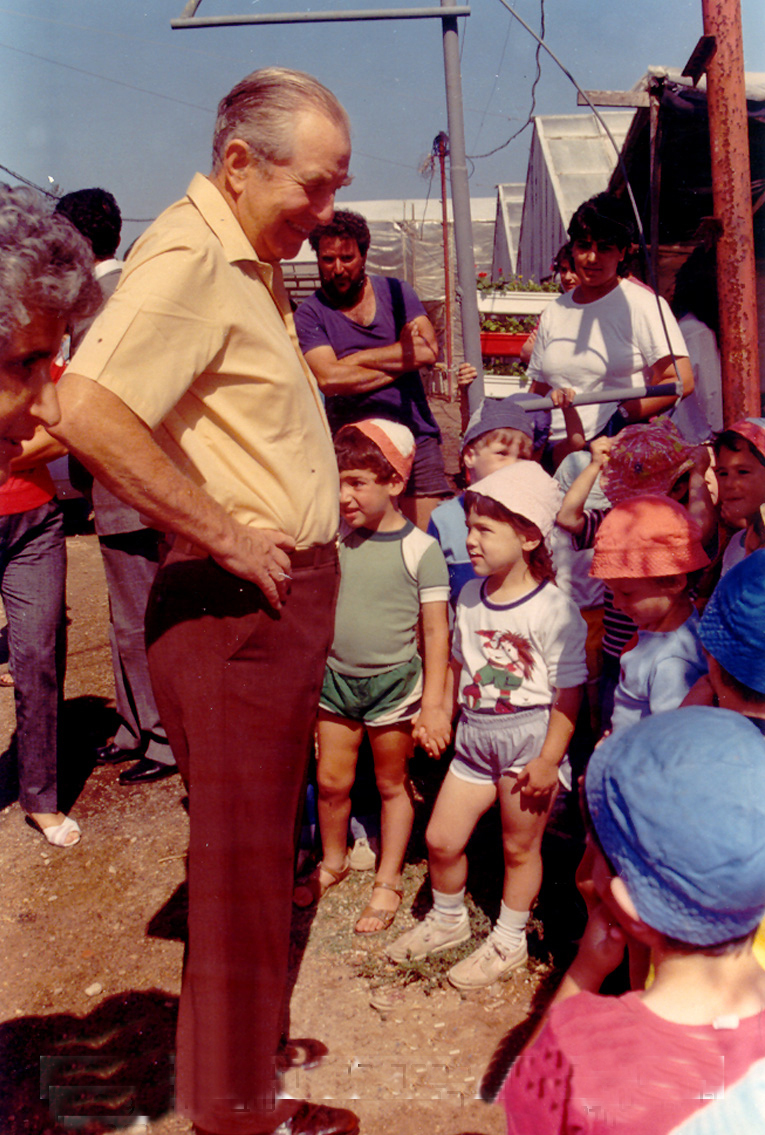
President Chaim Herzog visiting Beit Yitzhak in 1985

Beit Yitzhak-Sha'ar Hefer (Hebrew: בֵּית יִצְחָק־שַׁעַר חֵפֶר, lit. House of Isaac – Hefer Gate) is a moshav in central Israel. Located in the Sharon plain near Netanya, it falls under the jurisdiction of Hefer Valley Regional Council. In 2024 Beit-Yitzhak-Sha'ar Hefer had a population of 2,299.

== History ==
Historically, the territory of Beit Yitzhak-Sha'ar Hefer formed part of northern fringes the Forest of Sharon, a hallmark of the region's historical landscape. It was an open woodland dominated by Mount Tabor Oak (Quercus ithaburensis), which extended from Kfar Yona in the north to Ra’ananna in the south. The local Arab inhabitants traditionally used the area for pasture, firewood and intermittent cultivation. The intensification of settlement and agriculture in the coastal plain during the 19th century led to deforestation and subsequent environmental degradation known from Hebrew sources.

Beit Yitzhak was founded in 1939. According to a 1949 book by the Jewish National Fund, the village was founded by middle-aged German immigrants who farmed but mainly raised poultry. The book goes on to say "the moshav was built by Rassco and financed by the Feuerring legacy." It was named after Yitzhak Feuerring, a German Zionist leader. By 1948 it had a population of 300.

It later merged with the nearby villages of Sha'ar Hefer, Nira and Gan Hefer. Ganot Hadar was originally part of the merger, but broke away to become independent again. "Hefer" was an administrative district with a district chief in the time of King Solomon (1 Kings 4:10).

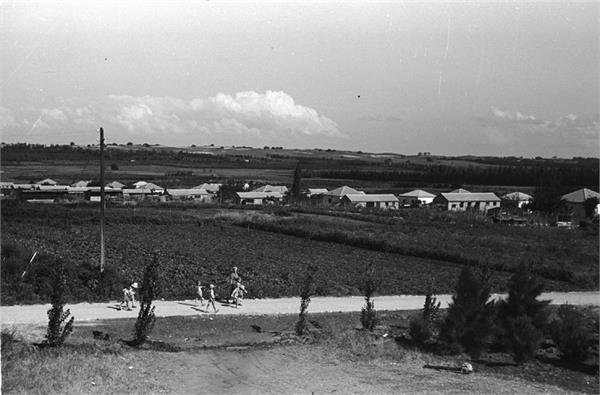
Gan Hefer 1947

== Economy ==
The economy of Beit Yitzhak is based primarily on agriculture, particularly fruits and vegetables. The 778 private jam factory was founded by two English families used to produces a popular line of confitures (jams containing whole fruit or very large fruit pieces). 778 was sold and the factory was closed. Today there is another private factory in the moshav under the trade name of Beit Yitzchak Natural Products that produces fruit spreads, preserves, jams and honey. At an annual trade show for kosher products in the United States, Beit Yitzhak Pomegranate Spread was one of the winners of the show's "new products" competition in 2008. Another private enterprise is Alexander winery (owned by Yoram Shalom), using grapes from its vineyards at Kerem Ben Zimra in the Upper Galilee. In 1961, two brothers from the Netherlands, Benyamin and Harry Meyer, opened a dairy in Beit Yitzhak which produced high quality Gouda cheese. The dairy is now run by Benyamin Meyer's son and his wife.

== Notable residents ==
- Shahar Milfelder (born 1997), Paralympic medalist rower
