= Harald Punt =

Dutch rower

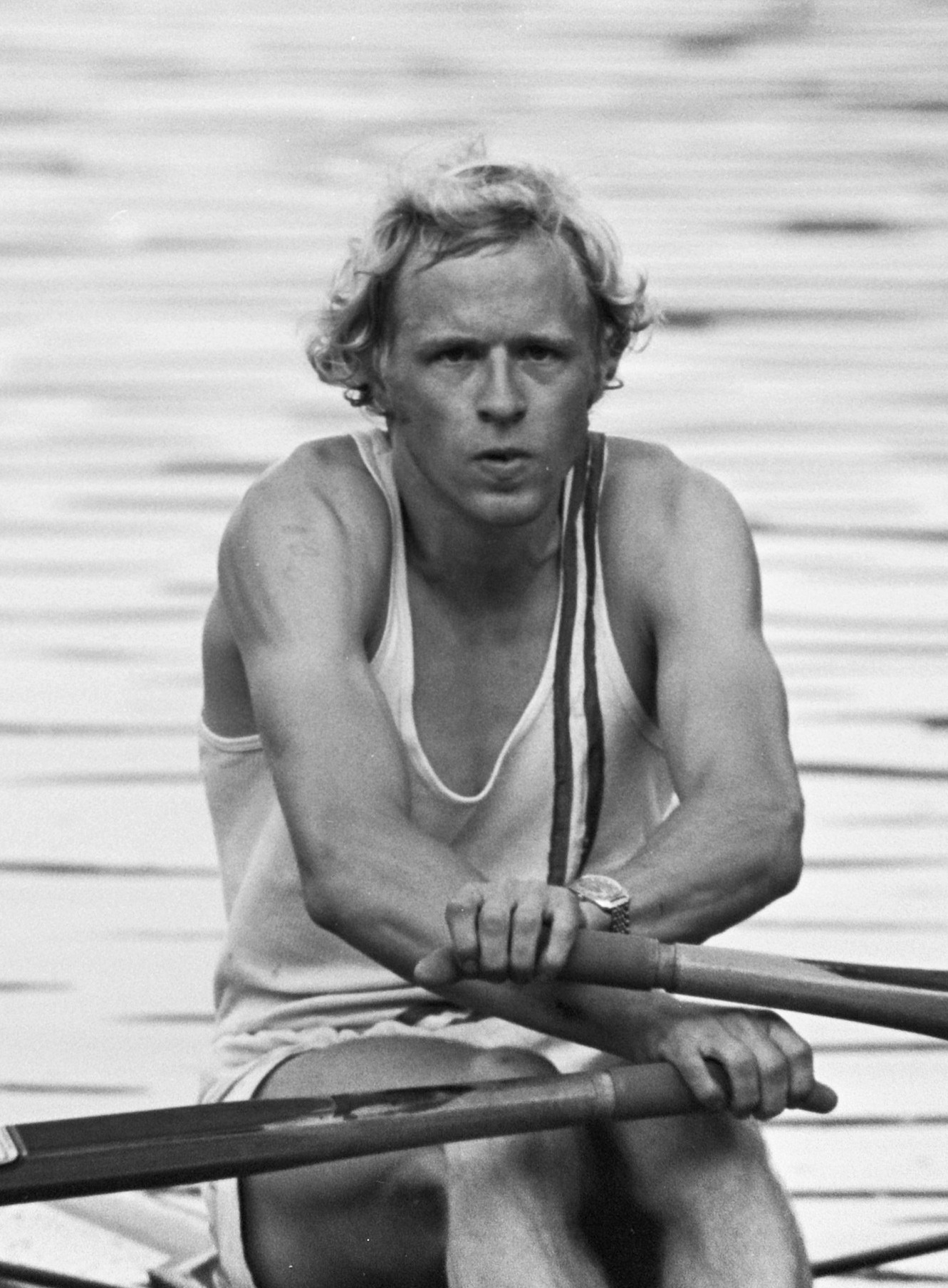
- Harald Punt in 1975

Personal information
- Born: 18 February 1952 (age 74)

Sport
- Sport: Rowing
Medal record
Representing the Netherlands
World Rowing Championships
Silver medal – second place	1974 Lucerne	LM1x
Silver medal – second place	1978 Copenhagen	LM2x
Silver medal – second place	1979 Bled	LM2x

Harald Punt (born 18 February 1952) is a retired Dutch rower who won three silver medals at the World Lightweight Rowing Championships in 1974, 1978 and 1979 in the single and double sculls (with Roel Michels). He competed representing his rowing clubs "Roeivereniging de Laak" and the Dutch Royal Student rowing club K.S.R.V. Njord respectively.

Punt is a boatbuilder and speaks Dutch and German. After retiring from competitions he worked as a rowing coach, particularly with Andreas and Irene Schmelz.
