= Shahar Milfelder =

Israeli paralympic rower

Shahar Milfelder שחר מילפלדר
Personal information
- Born: 17 September 1997 (age 28) Beit Yitzchak, Israel

Sport
- Country: Israel
- Sport: Para-rowing
- Disability class: PR2
- Event: Double sculls
- Club: Beit Halochem
- Partner: Saleh Shahin
- Coached by: Dmitry Margolin and Sergey Bokarib

Achievements and titles
- World finals: 2023 World Rowing Championships, first in the PR2 Mixed Double Sculls Final B
Medal record
Para-rowing
Representing Israel
Paralympic Games
| Bronze medal – third place | 2024 Paris | PR2 mixed double sculls |
World Championships
| Bronze medal – third place | 2025 Shanghai | PR2 mixed double sculls |
| Bronze medal – third place | 2026 Amsterdam | PR2 mixed double sculls |
European Championships
| Bronze medal – third place | 2026 Varese | PR2 mixed double sculls |

Shahar Milfelder (Hebrew: שחר מילפלדר; born 17 September 1997) is an Israeli Paralympic medalist rower. She competed for Israel at the 2024 Paris Paralympics in the PR2 mixed double sculls and won the bronze medal with her rowing partner Druze-Israeli Saleh Shahin.

== Early life ==
Milfelder grew up in Moshav Beit Yitzchak in Israel. At the age of 15, she was diagnosed with a rare and violent bone cancer, and at the time was the only patient in Israel who suffered from it. She went to a hospital in New Jersey in the United States for radiation therapy, but the tumor returned after her treatments. She then underwent a 16-hour operation in a Manhattan hospital, in which half of her pelvis was removed. Initially, she had a special brace so she could walk with a walker, but in time she switched to crutches, and she now can move around with one crutch. She moved to Tel Aviv to be close to her training facility.

She later volunteered for the Israel Defense Forces, and served for five years as a simulator instructor and officer in the Israeli Air Force.

== Rowing career ==
Milfelder's club is Beit HaLohm Tel Aviv, and she trains at the Daniel Rowing Center with Dima Margolin and Sergi Bokarib.

Her rowing partner is Druze-Israeli Saleh Shahin, who is 15 years older than she is, and was injured while fighting terrorists on the Gaza border. At the 2019 World Rowing Cup III, they won a gold medal in the PR3 Mixed Double Sculls (FA). At the 2023 World Rowing Championships, they came in first in the PR2 Mixed Double Sculls Final B. At the 2024 World Rowing Final Olympic and Paralympic Qualification Regatta in Switzerland, they won a silver medal in the PR2 Mixed Double Sculls and qualified for the 2024 Paralympics.

=== 2024 Paris Paralympics; bronze medal ===
They competed at the 2024 Paris Paralympics in the PR2 mixed double sculls, and won the bronze medal, with a time of 8:31.85, 13 seconds behind gold medalist Great Britain. Milfelder, speaking of the families of the six newly confirmed dead hostages, said: "We had in mind to give pride to the country. I cried in the morning from the hard news, and now I cry from the good news, and send the biggest hug I can to the families of the abducted and to all the citizens of the State of Israel."

== See also ==
- List of 2024 Summer Paralympics medal winners
