= 2019 World Rowing Championships – PR2 Men's single sculls =

PR2 Men's single sculls at the 2019 World Rowing Championships
- Venue: Linz-Ottensheim
- Location: Ottensheim, Austria
- Dates: 26–30 August
- Competitors: 8 from 8 nations
- Winning time: 8:42.78

Medalists
| gold medal | Corne de Koning | Netherlands |
| silver medal | Jeremy Hall | Canada |
| bronze medal | Daniele Stefanoni | Italy |

The PR2 men's single sculls competition at the 2019 World Rowing Championships took place at the Linz-Ottensheim regatta venue.

== Schedule ==
The schedule was as follows:

| Date | Time | Round |
|---|---|---|
| Mondan 26 August 2019 | 10:24 | Heats |
| Wednesday 28 August 2019 | 09:46 | Repechage |
| Friday 30 August 2019 | 10:15 | Final B |
| Friday 30 August 2019 | 13:20 | Final A |

All times are Central European Summer Time (UTC+2)

== Results ==
=== Heats ===
Heat winners advanced directly to the A final. The remaining boats were sent to the repechage.

==== Heat 1 ====
| Rank | Rower | Country | Time | Notes |
|---|---|---|---|---|
| 1 | Jeremy Hall | Canada | 8:52.35 | FA |
| 2 | Daniele Stefanoni | Italy | 9:12.36 | R |
| 3 | Jorge Pineda | Spain | 9:57.14 | R |
| 4 | Leopold Reimann | Germany | 10:00.18 | R |

==== Heat 2 ====
| Rank | Rower | Country | Time | Notes |
|---|---|---|---|---|
| 1 | Corne de Koning | Netherlands | 8:59.82 | FA |
| 2 | Isaac French | United States | 9:46.84 | R |
| 3 | Gavin Foulsham | New Zealand | 9:56.57 | R |
| 4 | Fei Tianming | China | 11:30.26 | R |

=== Repechage ===
The four fastest boats advanced to the A final. The remaining boats were sent to the B final.

| Rank | Rower | Country | Time | Notes |
|---|---|---|---|---|
| 1 | Daniele Stefanoni | Italy | 9:08.19 | FA |
| 2 | Isaac French | United States | 9:17.44 | FA |
| 3 | Jorge Pineda | Spain | 9:28.09 | FA |
| 4 | Gavin Foulsham | New Zealand | 9:30.96 | FA |
| 5 | Leopold Reimann | Germany | 9:42.69 | FB |
| 6 | Fei Tianming | China | 10:56.44 | FB |

=== Finals ===
The A final determined the rankings for places 1 to 6. Additional rankings were determined in the B final.

==== Final B ====
| Rank | Rower | Country | Time |
|---|---|---|---|
| 1 | Leopold Reimann | Germany | 9:40.98 |
| 2 | Fei Tianming | China | 10:33.06 |

==== Final A ====
| Rank | Rower | Country | Time |
|---|---|---|---|
| 1st place, gold medalist(s) | Corne de Koning | Netherlands | 8:42.78 |
| 2nd place, silver medalist(s) | Jeremy Hall | Canada | 8:47.44 |
| 3rd place, bronze medalist(s) | Daniele Stefanoni | Italy | 9:11.55 |
| 4 | Jorge Pineda | Spain | 9:26.88 |
| 5 | Isaac French | United States | 9:29.96 |
| 6 | Gavin Foulsham | New Zealand | 9:32.67 |
