= 2023 World Rowing Championships – PR2 Men's single sculls =

PR2 Men's single sculls at the 2023 World Rowing Championships
- Venue: Lake Sava
- Location: Belgrade, Serbia
- Dates: 5 September – 8 September
- Competitors: 6 from 6 nations
- Winning time: 9:48.32

Medalists
gold medal	Corné de Koning	Netherlands
silver medal	Gian Filippo Mirabile	Italy
bronze medal	Paul Umbach	Germany

The PR2 men's single sculls competition at the 2023 World Rowing Championships took place at Lake Sava, in Belgrade.

== Schedule ==
The schedule was as follows:

Date	Time	Round
Tuesday 5 September 2023	09:30	Heats
Friday 8 September 2023	14:31	Final

All times are Central European Summer Time (UTC+2)

== Results ==
All boats advanced directly to Final.

=== Heat ===
Rank	Rower	Country	Time	Notes
1	Corné de Koning	Netherlands	9:15.69	F
2	Gian Filippo Mirabile	Italy	9:21.51	F
3	Paul Umbach	Germany	10:00.73	F
4	Beñat Odriozola	Spain	10:09.49	F
5	Julian Pablo Garcia	Argentina	10:41.30	F
6	Krists Mickevics	Latvia	11:08.45	F

=== Final ===
The final determined the rankings.

Rank	Rower	Country	Time
1st place, gold medalist(s)	Corné de Koning	Netherlands	9:48.32
2nd place, silver medalist(s)	Gian Filippo Mirabile	Italy	10:08.88
3rd place, bronze medalist(s)	Paul Umbach	Germany	10:42.49
4	Beñat Odriozola	Spain	10:55.23
5	Julian Pablo Garcia	Argentina	10:53.16
6	Krists Mickevics	Latvia	12:36.15
