= Yuliya Chernoy =

Israeli para-athlete (born 1979)

Yuliya Chernoy יוליה צ'רנוי
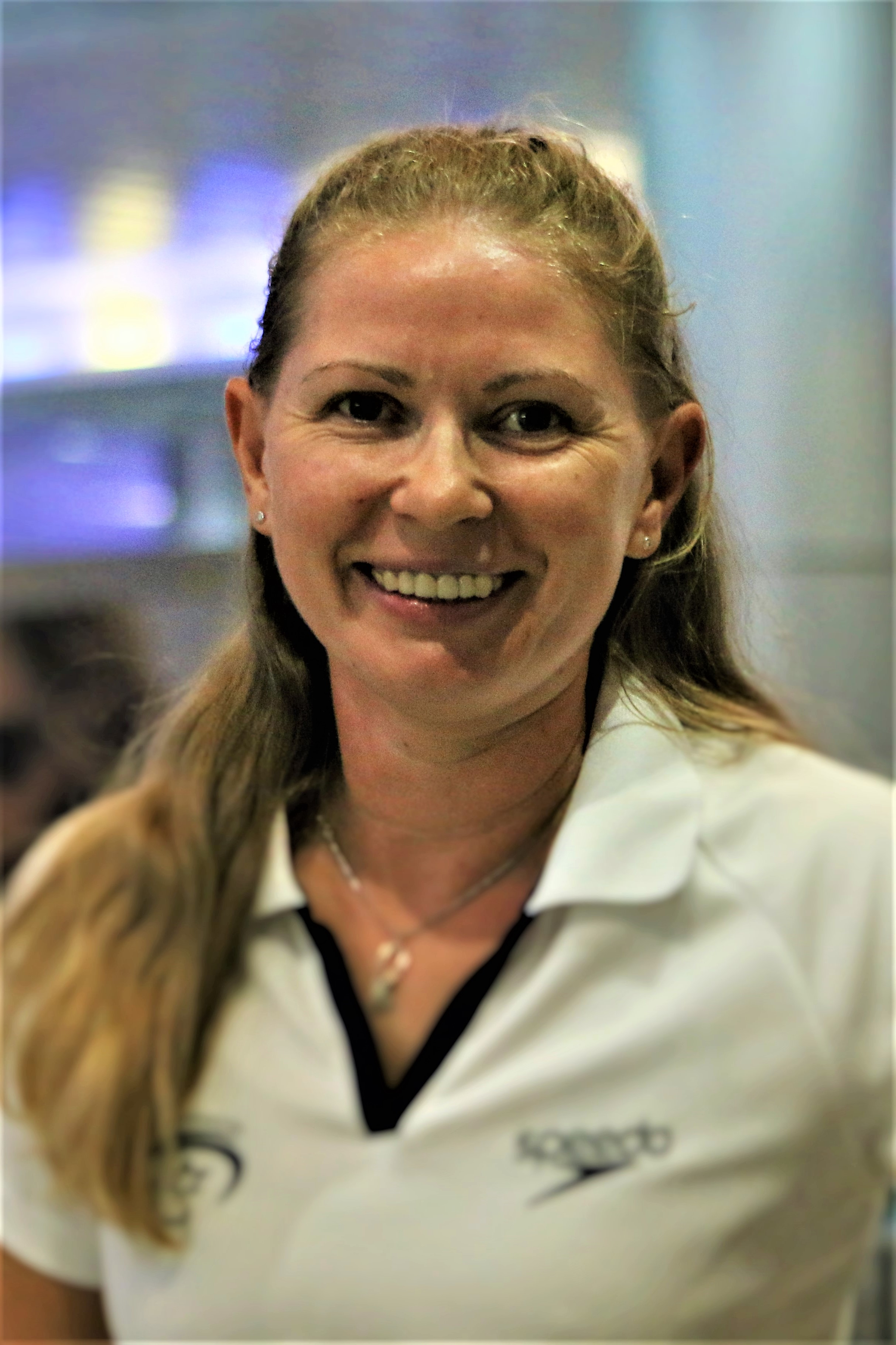

Personal information
- Nationality: Israeli
- Born: 6 December 1979 (age 46) Kazakh SSR, Soviet Union

Sport
- Sport: Para-rowing; Paralympic shooting
- Disability class: R3, R6, R8
Medal record
Women's Shooting Para Sport
World Championships
| Gold medal – first place | 2023 Lima | Mixed 10m Air Rifle Prone SH1 |
| Bronze medal – third place | 2023 Lima | Mixed 50m Rifle Prone SH1 |
| Bronze medal – third place | 2022 Abu Dhabi | Mixed 10m Air Rifle Prone SH1 |
| Bronze medal – third place | 2019 Sydney | Mixed 50m Rifle Prone SH1 |

Yuliya Chernoy (Hebrew: יוליה צ'רנוי; born 6 December 1979) is an Israeli para-athlete in para-rowing and para-shooting. She won a gold medal in the 10-meter prone position rifle competition at the 2022 European Team Championship, a bronze medal at the 2022 World Championships in Abu Dhabi, and two medals at the 2023 World Championships in Lima. She is competing for Israel at the 2024 Paris Paralympics.

== Early life ==
Chernoy was born in Kazakhstan with mild cerebral palsy, which makes it difficult for her to walk with her right leg and use her right hand and she uses a walking stick. She immigrated to Israel without her family in 2000.

== Sporting career ==
At the age of 31, Chernoy started parasports, first in the para-triathlon branch as part of a challenge association group. She trains at Beit HaLochem Tel Aviv with trainer Guy Strick.

Chernoy represented Israel at the 2016 Summer Paralympics in Rio de Janeiro together with Reuven Magnaji in rowing, and came in ninth place in the mixed double sculls. After the games, she requested to switch to shooting para sport for personal and professional reasons. Chernoy came in 12th place at the 2018 World Championships, out of 47 participants, in a mixed discipline for women and men - prone 10-meter air rifle, when Chernoy finished third among the women.

At the 2019 World Championships held in Australia, a mixed competition for women and men, Chernoy finished in third place in the 50 meter freestyle in a prone position, and won a bronze medal in shooting. Thanks to this achievement, she became the 16th athlete in the Israeli delegation to the 2020 Summer Paralympics. In Tokyo 2020, held in August 2021, Chernoy represented Israel in shooting.

In March 2022, Chernoy won a gold medal in the European Team Rifle Championship in the prone position 10 meters, together with Eli Chabra and Ofer Zur.

In November 2022, she won a bronze medal at the World Championships in Abu Dhabi in the 10-meter air rifle mixed event. She thus achieved the criterion for the Paris Olympics. In September 2023, at the World Championship in Lima, Peru, Chernoy won the gold medal in air rifle shooting at a distance of 10 meters, and a few days later she won the bronze medal in the 60-ball free shooting at a distance of 50 meters in a prone position.

She is competing for Israel at the 2024 Paris Paralympics.

== Personal life ==
Chernoy is in a relationship with Efrat and mother of two.
