= Saleh Shahin =

Israeli Druze rower (born 1982)

Saleh Shahin סאלח שאהין ;صلاح شاهین
Personal information
- Born: 28 October 1982 (age 43) Shfaram, Israel
- Height: 1.95 m (6 ft 5 in)
- Spouse: Sabrin Shahin
- Children: 3

Sport
- Sport: Para-rowing
- Disability class: PR2
- Event: Double sculls
- Club: Beit Halochem
- Partner: Shahar Milfelder
- Coached by: Dmitry Margolin and Sergey Bokarib

Achievements and titles
- World finals: 2023 World Rowing Championships, first in the PR2 Mixed Double Sculls Final B
Medal record
Para-rowing
Representing Israel
Paralympic Games
Bronze medal – third place	2024 Paris	PR2 mixed double sculls
World Championships
Bronze medal – third place	2025 Shanghai	PR2 mixed double sculls
Bronze medal – third place	2026 Amsterdam	PR2 mixed double sculls
European Championships
Bronze medal – third place	2026 Varese	PR2 mixed double sculls

Saleh Shahin (Arabic: صلاح شاهین, Hebrew: סאלח שאהין; born 28 October 1982) is an Israeli Paralympic medalist rower. He is Druze, from the Arab city of Shfaram, Israel. He enlisted in the Israel Defense Forces, and served as a commander in the paratroopers. He was wounded in 2005 in a terrorist attack. Shahin represented Israel at the 2024 Paris Paralympics in the PR2 mixed double sculls, and won the bronze medal with Shahar Milfelder.

== Early and personal life ==
Shahin is Druze, from the Arab city of Shfaram, Israel. He and his wife have two daughters. He enlisted in the Israel Defense Forces in 2003, and rose to be a commander in the paratroopers. Speaking of Arab-Jewish coexistence, Shahin said: "I feel an inseparable part of the State of Israel, and equal among equals."

== Terrorist incident and injury ==
On 13 January 2005, Shahin was at work as a security guard for the Israel Airports Authority at the Karni crossing checkpoint on the Gaza-Israel border. A number of terrorists from Gaza attacked the crossing, killed six Israeli civilians, wounding four others, and seriously wounding Shahin. Shahin attacked the terrorists, and in his exchange of gunfire with them Shahin was injured by four bullets which crushed his left foot, and entered his left thigh tearing a main artery, hip joint, pelvis, and intestines in his abdomen. He killed the terrorist who had shot him, as well as two other terrorists.

Shahin received two awards for his acts of bravery in stopping the attack and pursuing an attacker. He suffers from considerable limitation in his range of motion as a consequence of his injuries.

== Rowing career ==
His club is Beit Halochem in Tel Aviv, Israel. Shahin trains at the Daniel Rowing Centre and on the banks of the Yarkon River in Tel Aviv, and his coaches are Dmitry Margolin and Sergey Bokarib. He practices twice a day, six days a week. He is 1.95 meters (6 feet, 5 inches) tall.

His rowing partner is Jewish-Israeli Shahar Milfelder, who is 15 years his junior, at 16 years old was diagnosed with cancer, and half of her pelvis was removed. At the 2019 World Rowing Cup III, they won a gold medal in the PR3 Mixed Double Sculls (FA). At the 2023 World Rowing Championships, they came in first in the PR2 Mixed Double Sculls Final B. At the 2024 World Rowing Final Olympic and Paralympic Qualification Regatta in Switzerland, they won a silver medal in the PR2 Mixed Double Sculls and qualified for the 2024 Paralympics.

Shahin represented Israel at the 2024 Paris Paralympics in the PR2 mixed double sculls. He won the bronze medal with Shahar Milfelder, with a time of 8:31.85, 13 seconds behind gold medalist Great Britain. He said that at the start of their race, he heard the Israeli national anthem, and was in tears, as earlier that morning the bodies of six killed Israeli hostages had been recovered in Gaza.

== See also ==
- List of Arab citizens of Israel
- List of Israeli Druze
