= Sitting volleyball at the Summer Paralympics =

- Governing body: World ParaVolley
- Events: 2 (men: 1; women: 1)

Games
- 1960; 1964; 1968; 1972; 1976; 1980; 1984; 1988; 1992; 1996; 2000; 2004; 2008; 2012; 2016; 2020; 2024
- Medalists

Sitting volleyball was introduced as a full Paralympic event in 1976. The women's sitting volleyball event was also introduced in the 2004.

== Medal summary ==
Men's sitting volleyball medal winning for every Summer Games as follows:

Year	Gold	Silver	Bronze
1976	Netherlands	West Germany	Finland
1980	Netherlands	Sweden	Yugoslavia
1984	Netherlands	West Germany	Sweden
1988	Iran	Netherlands	Norway
1992	Iran	Netherlands	Germany
1996	Iran	Norway	Finland
2000	Iran	Bosnia and Herzegovina	Finland
2004	Bosnia and Herzegovina	Iran	Egypt
2008	Iran	Bosnia and Herzegovina	Russia
2012	Bosnia and Herzegovina	Iran	Germany
2016	Iran	Bosnia and Herzegovina	Egypt
2020	Iran	RPC	Bosnia and Herzegovina
2024	Iran	Bosnia and Herzegovina	Egypt

Women's sitting volleyball results:

Year	Gold	Silver	Bronze
2004	China	Netherlands	United States
2008	China	United States	Netherlands
2012	China	United States	Ukraine
2016	United States	China	Brazil
2020	United States	China	Brazil
2024	United States	China	Canada

Medals ranking:

Rank	Nation	Gold	Silver	Bronze	Total
1	Iran	8	2	0	10
2	Netherlands	3	3	1	7
3	China	3	3	0	6
4	United States	3	2	1	6
5	Bosnia and Herzegovina	2	4	1	7
6	Germany	0	2	2	4
7	Norway	0	1	1	2
7	Sweden	0	1	1	2
9	RPC	0	1	0	1
10	Egypt	0	0	3	3
10	Finland	0	0	3	3
12	Brazil	0	0	2	2
13	Canada	0	0	1	1
13	Russia	0	0	1	1
13	Ukraine	0	0	1	1
13	Yugoslavia	0	0	1	1
Totals (16 entries)		19	19	19	57
