= Daniele Stefanoni =

Italian male rower

Personal information
- National team: Italy
- Born: 28 August 1966 (age 59) Lecco, Italy
- Height: 1.86 m (6 ft 1 in)
- Weight: 78 kg (172 lb)

Sport
- Sport: Pararowing; Para cross-country skiing; Para biathlon
- Disability: Trunks and Arms
- Disability class: PR2
- Club: Canottieri Aniene; Gaviratese A.S.C.
- Coached by: Paola Grizzetti
Medal record
Pararowing
Event	1st	2nd	3rd
World Championships	0	0	2

Daniele Stefanoni (born 28 August 1966) is an Italian pararower, twice bronze medal winner at the World Rowing Championships.

== Biography ==
Stefanoni participated in three editions of the Paralympic Games, one winters (2006) and two summers (2008 and 2012).

== Achievements ==
Year	Competition	Venue	Rank	Event	Time
Para Nordic Skiing
2006	Winter Paralympics	(Italy) Turin	15th	10 km Standing	30:17.1
2006	Winter Paralympics	(Italy) Turin	8th	1x3.75/2x5 km Relay Open	42:35.90
2006	Winter Paralympics	(Italy) Turin	17th	20 km Standing	1:05:59.1
Para Biathlon
2006	Winter Paralympics	(Italy) Turin	16th	7.5 km Standing	25:38.5
2006	Winter Paralympics	(Italy) Turin	19th	12.5 km Standing	51:41.2
Pararowing
2008	Summer Paralympics	(China) Beijing	4th	Mixed double sculls PR2	4:32.30
2012	Summer Paralympics	(United Kingdom) London	6th	Mixed double sculls PR2	4:09-39
2018	World Championships	(Bulgaria) Plovdiv	3rd	Single scull PR2	8:52.08
2019	World Championships	(Austria) Ottensheim	3rd	Single scull PR2	9:11.55
