= Laurence Whiteley =

British Paralympic rower

Laurence Whiteley MBE
Personal information
- Born: 29 August 1991 (age 35) Scarborough
- Height: 78 kg
- Weight: 186 cm

Sport
- Sport: Rowing
- Disability class: TAMix2x
Medal record
Men's para rowing
Representing Great Britain
Paralympic Games
Gold medal – first place	2016 Rio de Janeiro	TA mixed double sculls
Gold medal – first place	2020 Tokyo	PR2 mixed double sculls
World Championships
Gold medal – first place	2019 Ottensheim	PR2 mixed double sculls
Silver medal – second place	2015 Aiguebelette	TA mixed double sculls

Laurence Whiteley (born 29 August 1991) is a British parasport rower. He won gold with Lauren Rowles in the trunk-arms mixed double sculls (TAMix2x) at the 2016 Summer Paralympics.

== Background ==
Whiteley, who is from Northallerton, North Yorkshire, attended Hurworth House School and Polam Hall School. He competed in triathlons as a youth and was the British Triathlon regional champion for the 13–14 age group. In 2006 at the age of 14 he was diagnosed with osteosarcoma (a form of bone cancer) below his right knee, and was given only a 30% chance of survival by doctors. He had surgery to remove the tumour, during which his knee joint and part of his fibula were removed, and further surgery to replace the joint and insert titanium rods into his leg. He also had chemotherapy over an 11-month period. He learned to walk again after a year of physiotherapy.

== Career ==
After his recovery Whiteley initially competed as a swimmer, and was national junior champion at 50 m freestyle in the S10 classification. He took up rowing in 2011 at the Tees Rowing Club, initially competing in the non-Paralympic trunk-arms men's single scull category. Since 2014 he has trained with the national squad in Caversham, Berkshire.

After searching for over two years for a suitable partner to compete with in Paralympic double sculls, Whiteley teamed up with Lauren Rowles, a former wheelchair racer who had recently switched to rowing, in early 2015. Their first major championship together was the 2015 World Rowing Championships, where they won the silver medal in the TAMix2x trunk-arms mixed double sculls. At the 2016 Summer Paralympics in Rio, they set a world record in the heats and went on to win gold in the final.
