= Jiang Jijian =

Chinese paralympic rower

Personal information
- Born: 14 May 1992 (age 34)
- Height: 186 cm (6 ft 1 in)
- Weight: 72 kg (159 lb)

Sport
- Country: China
- Sport: Para-rowing
- Disability class: PR2
Medal record
Para-rowing
Representing China
Paralympic Games
Silver medal – second place	2024 Paris	PR2 mixed double sculls
Bronze medal – third place	2020 Tokyo	Mixed double sculls
World Championships
Gold medal – first place	2025 Shanghai	PR2 Mixed double sculls
Silver medal – second place	2023 Belgrade	PR2 Mixed double sculls
Silver medal – second place	2026 Amsterdam	PR2 Mixed double sculls
Asian Para Games
Gold medal – first place	2022 Hangzhou	Mixed double sculls

Jiang Jijian (born 14 May 1992) is a Chinese paralympic rower.

== Career ==
He participated at the 2020 Summer Paralympics in the rowing competition, and won a bronze medal in the mixed double sculls event with his teammate, Liu Shuang.
