= Stéphane Tardieu =

French adaptive rower

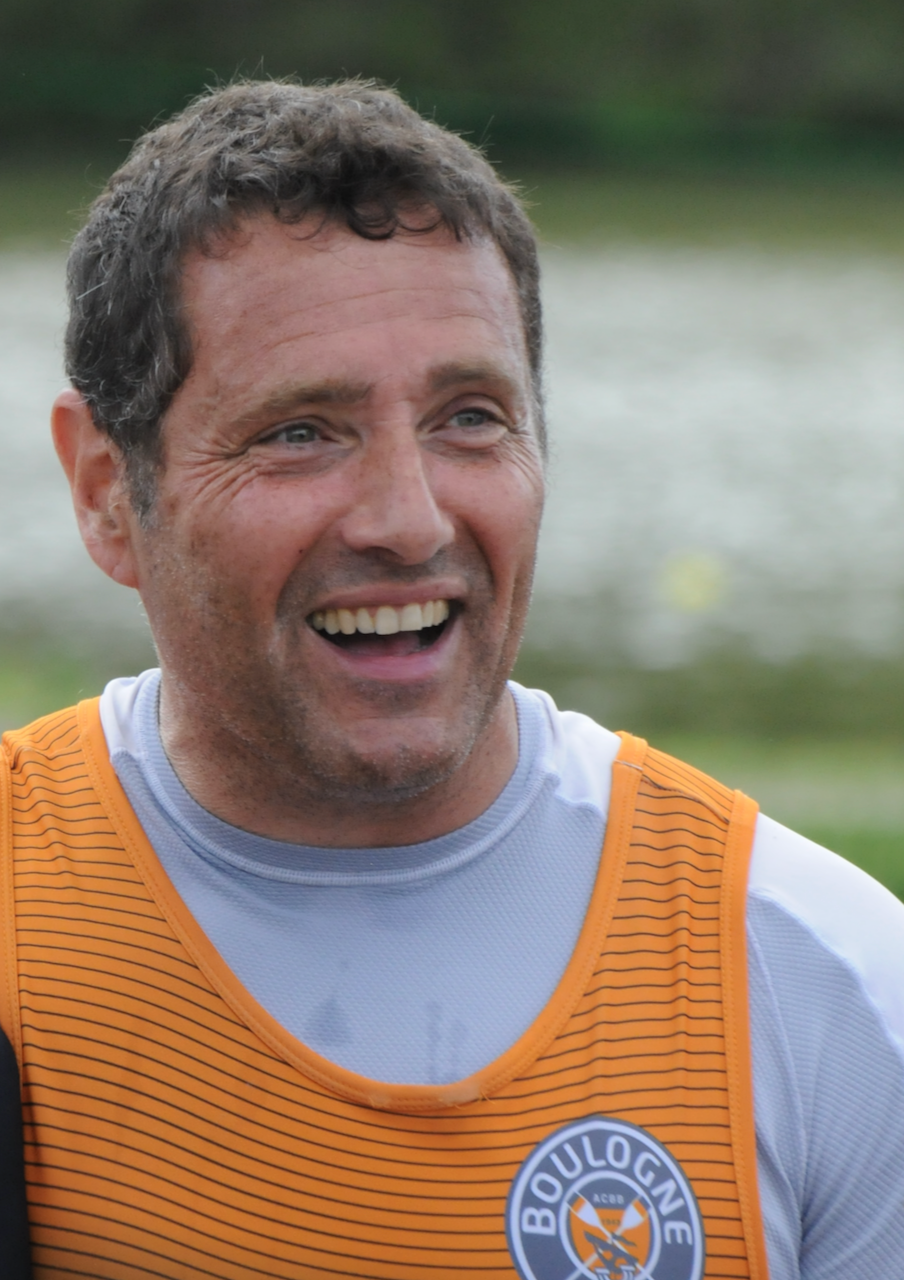

Personal information
- Born: 16 March 1970 (age 56) Paris, France
- Height: 1.83 m (6 ft 0 in)
- Weight: 80 kg (176 lb)

Sport
- Country: France
- Sport: Adaptive rowing
- Club: Boulogne 92
Medal record
Adaptive rowing
Representing France
Paralympic Games
Silver medal – second place	2012 London	TA mixed double sculls
Bronze medal – third place	2016 Rio de Janeiro	TA mixed double sculls
World Championships
Silver medal – second place	2010 Karapiro	TA mixed double sculls
Silver medal – second place	2011 Bled	TA mixed double sculls
Silver medal – second place	2013 Chungju	TA mixed double sculls
Silver medal – second place	2014 Amsterdam	TA mixed double sculls
Bronze medal – third place	2015 Aiguebelette	TA mixed double sculls
Bronze medal – third place	2022 Račice	PR2 mixed double sculls
European Championships
Silver medal – second place	2022 Munich	PR2 mixed double sculls

Stéphane Tardieu (born 16 March 1970) is a French adaptive rower who competes in international elite competitions, he started rowing when he was fourteen before switching to rugby, he went back to rowing in 2007 after losing a leg in a hunting accident two years previously. He competes in the double sculls with his training partner Perle Bouge, they have both won two Paralympic medals and five World medals.
