= Lauren Rowles =

British sports person

Lauren Rowles OBE
Personal information
- Full name: Lauren Rachel Catherine Rowles
- Born: 24 April 1998 (age 28)
- Height: 172 cm (5 ft 8 in)
- Weight: 56 kg (123 lb)

Sport
- Sport: Para athletics (2012–14); Para rowing (2015–present)
- Disability class: T54 (athletics); PR2 (rowing)
Medal record
Women's para rowing
Representing Great Britain
Paralympic Games
Gold medal – first place	2016 Rio de Janeiro	TA mixed double sculls
Gold medal – first place	2020 Tokyo	PR2 mixed double sculls
Gold medal – first place	2024 Paris	PR2 mixed double sculls
World Championships
Gold medal – first place	2019 Ottensheim	PR2 mixed double sculls
Gold medal – first place	2023 Belgrade	PR2 mixed double sculls
Silver medal – second place	2015 Aiguebelette-le-Lac	TA mixed double sculls
European Championships
Gold medal – first place	2023 Bled	PR2 mixed double sculls
Gold medal – first place	2024 Szeged	PR2 mixed double sculls

Lauren Rachel Catherine Rowles (born 24 April 1998) is a British parasport rower and former wheelchair athlete. She won gold with Laurence Whiteley in the trunk-arms mixed double sculls (TAMix2x) at the 2016 Summer Paralympics.The pair repeated their achievement in Tokyo at the 2021 Summer Paralympics.

== Background ==
Rowles, who is from Cofton Hackett, Bromsgrove District, attended North Bromsgrove High School. At the age of 13 she suddenly developed transverse myelitis (a condition in which the spinal cord is inflamed), which left her with no feeling below her chest. She decided to take up Paralympic sport while watching coverage of the 2012 Summer Paralympics during a stay in Stoke Mandeville Spinal Injuries Unit.

Rowles completed her A-levels at King Edward VI College, Stourbridge, and is currently studying law at Oxford Brookes University. She is openly gay. Rowles is engaged to Jude, a wheelchair basketball player.

== Career ==
Rowles competed as a wheelchair racer before switching to rowing. She took up the sport in November 2012 and competed in T54 events. In 2014, she was the England under-16s champion at 100 m, 200 m and 1,500 m. She represented England at the 2014 Commonwealth Games, where she was the youngest track and field athlete in the England team at the age of 16. She reached the final of the T54 1500 m, finishing ninth.

Rowles took up rowing in early 2015. She quickly teamed up with Laurence Whiteley, who had been searching for a suitable partner to compete with for over two years. They competed at the 2015 World Rowing Championships, winning the silver medal in the trunk-arms mixed double sculls. She and Whiteley competed at their first Paralympics in 2016, where they set a world record in the heats, and won gold in the final.

Rowles was appointed Member of the Order of the British Empire (MBE) in the 2017 New Year Honours and Officer of the Order of the British Empire (OBE) in the 2025 New Year Honours for services to rowing.
