= Paul Umbach =

German Paralympic rower (born 2002)

Personal information
- Born: 25 February 2002 (age 24) Neuruppin, Germany

Sport
- Country: Germany
- Sport: Pararowing
- Disability class: PR2
Medal record
Pararowing
Representing Germany
World Championships
Gold medal – first place	2026 Amsterdam	PR2 Mix2x
Silver medal – second place	2025 Shanghai	PR2 Mix2x
Bronze medal – third place	2022 Račice	PR2 M1x
Bronze medal – third place	2023 Belgrade	PR2 M1x
European Championships
Gold medal – first place	2025 Plovdiv	PR2 Mix2x
Gold medal – first place	2026 Varese	PR2 Mix2x
Silver medal – second place	2024 Szeged	PR2 Mix2x

Paul Umbach (born 25 February 2002) is a German pararower.

== Career ==
Umbach made his World Rowing Championships debut in 2022 World Rowing Championships and won a bronze medal in the PR2 Men's single sculls. He again competed at the 2023 World Rowing Championships and won a bronze medal in the PR2 Men's single sculls.

In June 2025, Umbach competed at the 2025 European Rowing Championships and won a gold medal in the PR2 mixed double sculls, along with Jasmina Bier. In September 2025, he competed at the 2025 World Rowing Championships and won a silver medal in the PR2 Mixed double sculls, along with Bier.

He competed at the 2026 European Rowing Championships and won a gold medal in the PR2 mixed double sculls, along with Bier.
