= PR2 (classification) =

Paralympic rowing classification

PR2 (previously TA) is a Paralympic rowing classification for people with trunk and arm function. The class includes people with spinal cord injuries, including people who have lesions from T10 to L4. This class has its origins in the P2 class, part of the original classification system for the sport developed in 1991.

== Definition ==
This class is for people with trunk and arm function. Rowing Australia defines this classification as "This class is for rowers who have trunk movement and who are unable to use the sliding seat to propel the boat because of significant weakness in the lower limbs. It will include many people such as: Bilateral above knee amputation, or significantly impaired quadriceps, or People with a neurological impairment equivalent to a complete lesion at L3 level, or an incomplete lesion at L1, or A combination of the above such as one leg with around knee amputation and one leg with significant quadriceps impairment; or Classification by the international sports federation for rowers with cerebral palsy (CPISRA) as eligible to be in CP Class 5."

== Disability groups ==
=== Spinal cord injuries ===
==== F6 ====
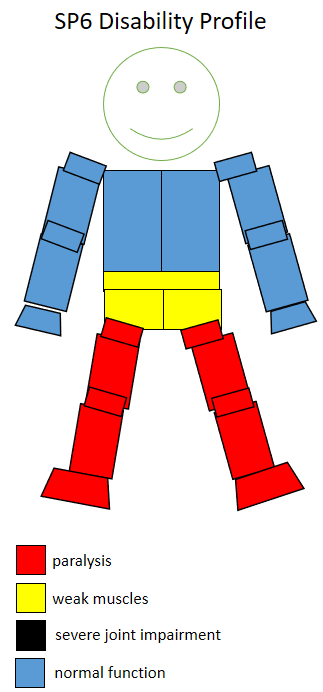
Functional profile of a wheelchair sportsperson in the F6 class.

This is wheelchair sport classification that corresponds to the neurological level L2 - L5. Historically, this class has been known as Lower 4, Upper 5. The location of lesions on different vertebrae tend to be associated with disability levels and functionality issues. L2 is associated with hip flexors. L3 is associated with knee extensors. L4 is associated with ankle doris flexors. L5 is associated with long toe extensors. People with lesions at L4 have issues with their lower back muscles, hip flexors and their quadriceps. People with lesions at the L4 to S2 who are complete paraplegics may have motor function issues in their gluts and hamstrings. Their quadriceps are likely to be unaffected. They may be absent sensation below the knees and in the groin area. People in this class have good sitting balance. People with lesions at L4 have trunk stability, can lift a leg and can flex their hips. They can walk independently with the use of longer leg braces. They may use a wheelchair for the sake of convenience. Recommended sports include many standing related sports. People in this class have a total respiratory capacity of 88% compared to people without a disability.

Currently, people with complete spinal cord injury at L3 level or incomplete lesion at L1 compete in TA. This class is for people with trunk and arm function. In 1991, the first internationally accepted adaptive rowing classification system was established and put into use. People from this class were initially classified as P2 for people with lesions at T10-L4.

== History ==
In 1991, the first internationally accepted adaptive rowing classification system was established and put into use. This class was known as P2. The classifications were developed and current as of March 2011. In 2017 the designation was changed from TA to PR2.

== Events ==
Rowers in this classification compete in single sculls for club, state, and national competitions. In international competitions, they compete in mixed double sculls.

== Competitors ==
Competitors in this class include Australia's Kathryn Ross and Grant Bailey.

== Becoming classified ==
Classification is handled by FISA – International Rowing Federation. Australians seeking classification through Rowing Australia need to provide several documents to a classifier at the time of application, including a doctor's statement that documents their impairment, when it was acquired and if the doctor expects changes in the level of disability in terms of increases or decreases in the severity of the disability.
