= Simon Albury =

Australian Paralympic rower

Personal information
- Nickname: Simmo
- Born: 9 May 1982 (age 44) Brisbane, Queensland, Australia
- Home town: Adelaide, South Australia, Australia

Sport
- Country: Australia
- Sport: Rowing
- Club: Torrens Rowing Club/SASI
- Coached by: Christine MacLaren

Simon Albury (born 9 May 1982) is an Australian Paralympic rower. He partnered Kathryn Ross at the 2020 Tokyo Paralympics.

== Personal ==
Albury was born on 9 May 1982. He was born and grew up in Brisbane, Queensland. In December 2019, he had a work place accident where he fell into a hay bailing machine and lost both his legs. He is married to Melissa and they have four children - Austin, Riley, Layla and Connor. He lives in Adelaide, South Australia.

== Rowing ==
Albury took up rowing after the accident as a form of exercise. He rows from the Torrens Rowing Club on Adelaide. He won the PR2 Men's Single Scull PR2 at the 2021 Australian Championships. He has been selected to row at the 2020 Tokyo Paralympics i. In June 2021, rowing with Kathryn Ross in the PR2 Mixed Double Scull, he finished second in the Final Paralympic Qualification Regatta in Gavirate, Italy to secure at berth at Games.

At the 2020 Tokyo Paralympics, Albury, with Kathryn Ross, won the B Final of the Rowing – Mixed double sculls with a time of 8:56.69.
