= Jasmina Bier =

German Paralympic rower (born 1997)

Personal information
- Born: 5 May 1997 (age 29) Bremen, Germany

Sport
- Country: Germany
- Sport: Pararowing
- Disability class: PR2
Medal record
Pararowing
Representing Germany
World Championships
| Gold medal – first place | 2026 Amsterdam | PR2 Mix2x |
| Silver medal – second place | 2025 Shanghai | PR2 Mix2x |
European Championships
| Gold medal – first place | 2025 Plovdiv | PR2 Mix2x |
| Gold medal – first place | 2026 Varese | PR2 Mix2x |
| Silver medal – second place | 2024 Szeged | PR2 Mix2x |

Jasmina Bier (born 5 May 1997) is a German pararower.

== Career ==
In June 2025, Bier competed at the 2025 European Rowing Championships and won a gold medal in the PR2 mixed double sculls, along with Paul Umbach. In September 2025, she made her World Rowing Championships debut at the 2025 World Rowing Championships and won a silver medal in the PR2 Mixed double sculls, along with Umbach. She was subsequently named Sportswoman of the Year at the 2025 Hamburg Sports Gala.

She competed at the 2026 European Rowing Championships and won a gold medal in the PR2 mixed double sculls, along with Umbach.
