= Liu Shuang =

Chinese paralympic rower

Personal information
- Born: 28 October 1993 (age 32)

Sport
- Country: China
- Sport: Para-rowing
- Disability class: PR2
Medal record
Para-rowing
Representing China
Paralympic Games
Silver medal – second place	2016 Rio de Janeiro	Mixed double sculls
Silver medal – second place	2024 Paris	PR2 mixed double sculls
Bronze medal – third place	2020 Tokyo	Mixed double sculls
World Championships
Gold medal – first place	2025 Shanghai	PR2 Mixed double sculls
Silver medal – second place	2023 Belgrade	PR2 Mixed double sculls
Silver medal – second place	2026 Amsterdam	PR2 Mixed double sculls
Asian Para Games
Gold medal – first place	2022 Hangzhou	Mixed double sculls

Liu Shuang (born 28 October 1993) is a Chinese pararower.

== Career ==
She participated at the 2016 Summer Paralympics in the rowing competition, and won a silver medal in the mixed double sculls event with her teammate, Fein Tianming. Shuang also participated at the 2020 Summer Paralympics in the rowing competition, being awarded the bronze medal in the mixed double sculls event with her teammate, Jiang Jijian.
