= Corné de Koning =

Dutch rower (born 1989)

Personal information
- Full name: Marinus Corné de Koning
- Nickname: The King
- Born: 27 September 1989 (age 36) Goes, Netherlands
- Height: 182 cm (6 ft 0 in)
- Weight: 81 kg (179 lb)

Sport
- Country: Netherlands
- Sport: Adaptive rowing
- Club: GRV Scaldis
Medal record
Men's pararowing
Representing the Netherlands
Paralympic Games
Silver medal – second place	2020 Tokyo	PR2 mixed double sculls
World Championships
Gold medal – first place	2017 Sarasota	PR2 mixed double sculls
Gold medal – first place	2018 Plovdiv	PR2 single sculls
Gold medal – first place	2018 Plovdiv	PR2 mixed double sculls
Gold medal – first place	2019 Ottensheim	PR2 single sculls
Gold medal – first place	2022 Račice	PR2 single sculls
Gold medal – first place	2023 Belgrade	PR2 single sculls
Silver medal – second place	2019 Ottensheim	PR2 mixed double sculls
European Championships
Gold medal – first place	2020 Poznan	PR2 mixed double sculls
Silver medal – second place	2021 Varese	PR2 mixed double sculls
Silver medal – second place	2023 Bled	PR2 mixed double sculls

Marinus Corné de Koning (born 27 September 1989) is a Dutch adaptive rower who competes at international level events. He is a four time World champion and European champion in both single sculls and double sculls. He is the training partner of Annika van der Meer and Esther van der Loos. He and van der Loos narrowly missed winning a medal in the mixed double sculls.

De Koning was born with one leg shorter than the other.
