= Laura Goodkind =

American rower

Personal information
- Born: 22 April 1986 (age 40) New York City, United States
- Home town: Los Angeles, United States
- Education: Crafton Hills College; Southern California University of Health Sciences; Whittier College
- Height: 5 ft 5 in (165 cm)
- Weight: 150 lb (68 kg)

Sport
- Country: United States
- Sport: Rowing
- Disability class: PR2
- Club: Miami Beach Rowing Club

Laura Goodkind (born 22 April 1986) is an American rower. She represented the United States in women's rowing at the 2016 and 2020 Summer Paralympics. She represented the United States at three consecutive World Rowing Championships from 2017 to 2019, and achieved a career-best fifth-place finish in the PR2 mixed double sculls event at the 2017 edition.

== Early and personal life ==
Laura Goodkind was born on 22 April 1986 in New York City. She attended The Forman School and later studied psychology and liberal studies at Crafton Hills College. She subsequently studied chemistry at the Southern California University of Health Sciences and later attended Whittier College, where she studied psychology.

Goodkind was diagnosed with cerebral palsy in infancy and underwent multiple reconstructive surgeries during her childhood. She identifies herself as gender-neutral. She plays the ukulele.

== Career ==
Goodkind began rowing in 2014 based on her doctor's advice to explore sports after a severe illness involving complications with swallowing which led to sepsis. She qualified for the 2016 Summer Paralympics less than two years after taking up the sport. She teamed up with Helman Roman to win the Trunk and Arms Mixed Double (TAM2X) class at the 2016 Non-Qualified Paralympic Trials conducted by USRowing. The duo finished third in the boat class at the Final Paralympic Qualification Regatta held between 21 and 23 April 2016 in Lake Varese. As only the top two teams qualified, the duo did not secure a direct qualification for the Paralympics. However, after the International Paralympic Committee imposed a ban on Russian athletes in August 2016, Roman and Goodkind were awarded a quota place in the mixed double sculls event.

At the 2016 Paralympics, Roman and Goodkind competed in the mixed double sculls event that took place at the Rodrigo de Freitas Lagoon between 9 and 11 September 2016. In the first qualifying heat, the duo finished fifth out of the six teams. In the repechage heats, the duo finished fifth and last in the second race. The team was ranked tenth out of the 12 teams in the final classification, after finishing fourth in the classification final 'B'.

Goodkind represented the United States at three consecutive World Rowing Championships from 2017 to 2019. She competed in the PR2 mixed double sculls event at all the three Championships and also competed in the PR2 women's single sculls event at the 2018 World Rowing Championships. She achieved a career-best fifth-place finish in the PR2 mixed double sculls event at the 2017 edition.

Goodkind teamed up with Russell Gernaat to secure first place in the PR2 mixed double sculls event at the 2020 U.S. Olympic and Paralympic Team Trials, and qualified for the 2020 Summer Paralympics. At the 2020 Paralympics, the mixed double sculls event took place in Tokyo between 27 and 29 August 2021. In the first qualifying heat, Gernaat and Goodkind finished fifth out of the six teams. In the repechage heats, the duo finished fourth amongst the five teams in the second race. The team was ranked tenth out of the 12 teams in the final classification, after finishing fourth in the classification final 'B'.
