= Perle Bouge =

French Paralympic rower

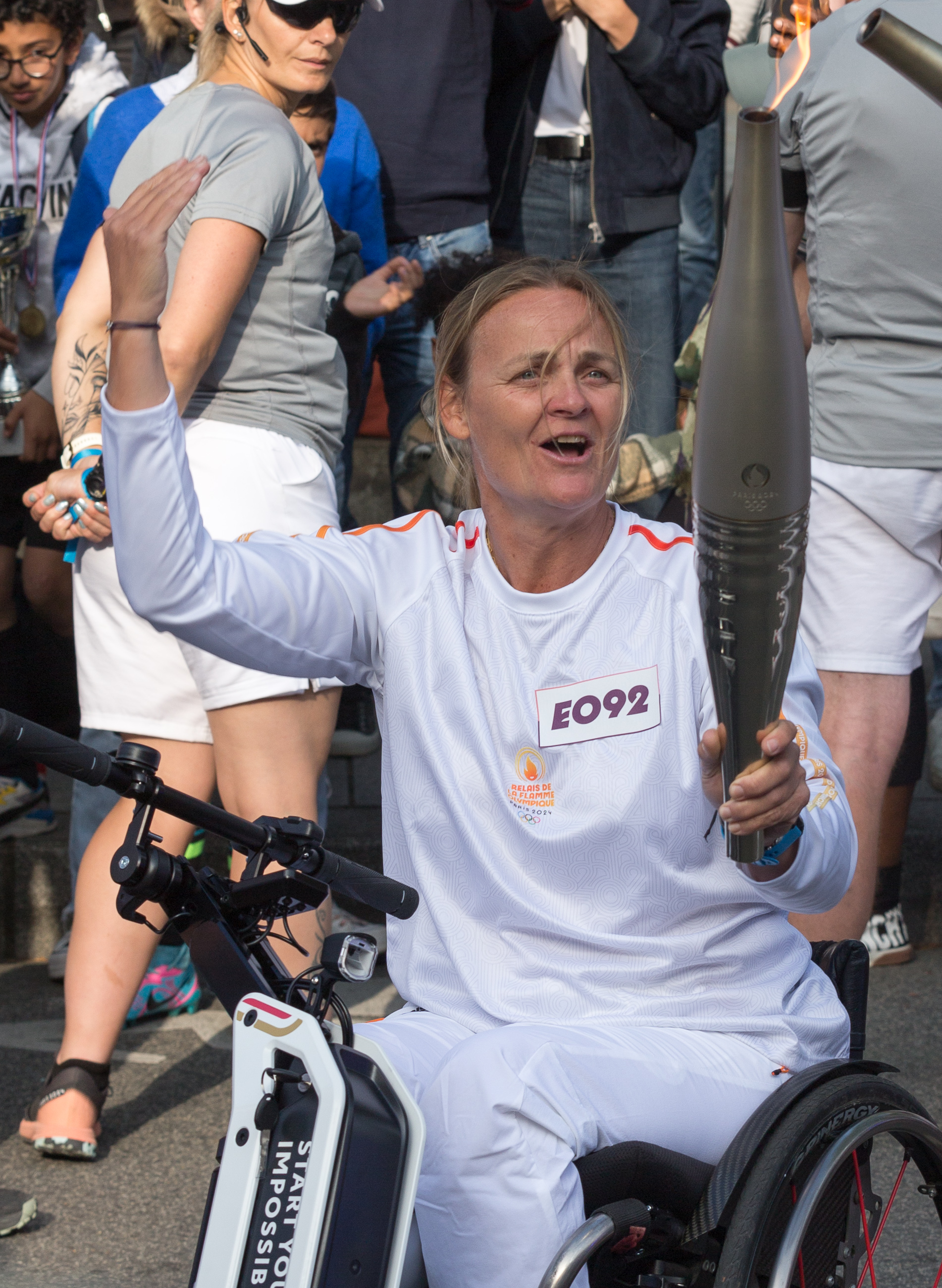
- Perle Bouge with the Olympic torch in Rennes.

Personal information
- Nationality: French
- Born: 1 December 1977 (age 48) Rennes, Ille-et-Vilaine, France

Sport
- Sport: Rowing
Medal record
Women's adaptive rowing
Representing France
Paralympic Games
Silver medal – second place	2012 London	TAMix2x
Bronze medal – third place	2016 Rio de Janeiro	TAMix2x
World Championships
Gold medal – first place	2018 Plovdiv	PR2 W1x
Silver medal – second place	2010 Cambridge	TAMix2x
Silver medal – second place	2011 Bled	TAMix2x
Silver medal – second place	2013 Chungju	TAMix2x
Silver medal – second place	2014 Amsterdam	TAMix2x
Bronze medal – third place	2015 Aiguebelette	TAMix2x
Bronze medal – third place	2019 Ottensheim	PR2 Mix2x
Bronze medal – third place	2022 Račice	PR2 Mix2x
European Championships
Silver medal – second place	2022 Munich	PR2 Mix2x
Bronze medal – third place	2021 Varese	PR2 Mix2x

Perle Bouge (born 1 December 1977 in Rennes) is a French disabled rower, with a silver medal at the 2012 Summer Paralympics in London, and a bronze medal at the 2016 Summer Paralympics in Rio.

== Biography ==
Bouge participated in the trunk and arms category. She has won two paralympic medals in mixed doubles with Stéphane Tardieu: a silver medal at London 2012 and a bronze medal at Rio 2016.

== Prize list ==
=== Paralympics ===
- Summer paralympic games, 2012, London
  - Silver, mixed double
- Summer paralympic games 2016, Rio de Janeiro
  - Bronze, mixed double

=== World Cups ===
- 2010, Karapiro
  - Silver medal in double mixed couple, 2011 in Bled
  - two in mixed couple
- 2013, Chungju
  - Silver medal, double mixed couple
- 2014, Amsterdam
  - Silver medal, double mixed couple
- 2018, Aiguebelette
  - Gold medal, Single scull

=== France Championship ===
- 2010, 2011 and 2012 sculls

== Distinctions ==
- 2013 Knight of the National Merit Order
