= Josiane Lima =

Brazilian para rower

Personal information
- Full name: Josiane Dias de Lima
- Born: 25 February 1975 (age 51) Florianópolis, Santa Catarina, Brazil
- Height: 169 cm (5 ft 7 in)
- Weight: 73 kg (161 lb)

Sport
- Sport: Para rowing
- Disability class: PR2

Achievements and titles
- Personal best(s): Mixed double sculls: 08:26.98; Mixed double sculls 1 km: 03:57.94; Single sculls: 10:36.00; Indoor single 1 km: 03:56.8
Medal record
Representing Brazil
Paralympic Games
| Bronze medal – third place | 2008 Beijing | mixed double sculls |
World Rowing Championships
| Gold medal – first place | 2007 Munich | mixed double sculls |
| Silver medal – second place | 2009 Poznán | mixed double sculls |
| Bronze medal – third place | 2014 Amsterdam | TA mixed double sculls |
World Rowing Cup
| Silver medal – second place | 2012 Belgrade | TA mixed double sculls |
| Silver medal – second place | 2015 Varese | TA mixed double sculls |
| Silver medal – second place | 2018 Ottensheim | PR2 mixed double sculls |
World Rowing Indoor Championships
| Gold medal – first place | 2011 | women's 1000 m |
| Gold medal – first place | 2014 | women's 1000 m |

Josiane Dias de Lima (born 25 February 1975) is a Brazilian para-rower in sculling events. She has won various accolades in her main event, the PR2 (formerly TA) mixed double sculls, including a bronze medal with Elton Santana at the 2008 Summer Paralympics, and a gold medal with Lucas Pagani at the 2007 World Rowing Championships. Lima has competed at every Paralympic Games that has featured rowing, and won Brazil's first Olympic rowing medal with Santana (thus also the first woman to win a rowing medal for Brazil). She has also competed in the women's single sculls and indoor rowing.

== Early life and injury ==
Josiane Dias de Lima was born on 25 February 1975 in the island city of Florianópolis, in southern Brazil. Her father was a fisherman; she credits this and growing up knowing the sea with making her a good athlete in the water. After playing volleyball and practicing judo, she became a PE teacher, and continued participating in various sports; in 2004, she was involved in a motorcycle accident while on her way to football training. The muscles in her legs atrophied, which was exacerbated by breaking her leg a year later while bodysurfing. She was left with paralysis in her left leg.

== Career ==
Having explored swimming as a means of physical rehabilitation, in 2006 Lima was invited to learn rowing with a non-governmental organization to help disabled people in sport in Florianópolis. She was immediately entered into competition for the 2006 World Rowing Championships with Rafael Luz in the mixed doubles sculls. She came back with Lucas Pagani as her partner for the 2007 World Rowing Championships, and the pair took the gold. The Brazilian Rowing Confederation then paired Lima with Elton Santana, from Bahia in the north of Brazil, ahead of the Beijing 2008 Summer Paralympics. Lima and Santana had focused pairs training for about eight months, despite living in different parts of the country; they trained in their own cities, sharing training online with the confederation, and met up at the University of São Paulo for two weeks training together at the Olympic lane every 40 days. The pair won their heat in Beijing, with the overall second-fastest time; in the final, they won the bronze medal. Lima contracted a sinus infection shortly before the Games and was displeased with the air quality in Beijing, noting that while she and Santana dominated the race for the first three-quarters, she got blurred vision and was seeing stars at the end. Sticking together for the 2009 World Rowing Championships, they won the silver medal. They were finalists for the World Rowing 2009 Adaptive Crew of the Year award, and Lima was named World Rowing Athlete of the Month in February 2011.

Her training then returned to instability: having several more boat partners, she missed out on a medal at the London 2012 Summer Paralympics. In 2013, Michel Gomes Pessanha became a para-rower, and the same year the confederation gave him the opportunity to try-out to be Lima's next partner. Pessanha stood out to Lima for his commitment to training, while Pessanha found in Lima experience and confidence in the boat that he sought. The new duo won the bronze medal at the 2014 World Rowing Championships; they had needed to go to repechage to qualify for the final, winning the repechage by a second. This medal led to them being described by World Rowing as ones to watch ahead of the Rio 2016 Summer Paralympics, held in Brazil. When the 2020 Summer Paralympics were postponed due to the COVID-19 pandemic, Lima's home state of Santa Catarina supported her to continue training. Brazil's Paralympic rowers then relocated to the Paralympic Training Centre facility in 2021.

At the 2022 World Rowing Championships, Lima rowed with Leandro Sagaz; though they came last in both their heat and repechage, they improved by over 20 seconds to win the small final.

Having competed at all Paralympic Games to feature rowing, Lima has said that her favourite Paralympic Games experiences were at home in Rio 2016 and conquering the pandemic in Tokyo 2020. She has also said that her first Games in 2008 "was one of the happiest moments of [her] life", considering the medal she won in 2008 the greatest achievement of her career. Still an active rower, Lima became the president of the ethics division of the rowing confederation in 2022, with her term set to end in 2024. She has said that she wants to use the position to combat systemic abuses after having experienced bullying, harassment and misogyny in her own career. She has also criticised the previous administration of the confederation for changing her boat partner for their own reasons, as well as politicians in Brazil since the crisis in 2015 for also creating instability in its treatment of athletes.

== Personal life ==
Lima is of indigenous descent. She is LGBTQ+, an advocate for combating queerphobia in Brazil, and has said she is proud to represent female, queer and indigenous people in sport.

== See also ==
- List of Paralympic medalists in rowing
- List of LGBT Paralympians
