= Jolanta Majka =

Polish rower

Personal information
- Nicknames: Joli, Jola
- Born: 13 July 1978 (age 47) Warsaw, Poland
- Height: 168 cm (5 ft 6 in)
- Weight: 58 kg (128 lb)

Sport
- Country: Poland
- Sport: Adaptive rowing
Medal record
Adaptive rowing
Representing Poland
World Championships
Silver medal – second place	2006 Eton	TAMix2x
Silver medal – second place	2018 Plovdiv	PR2 Mix2x
Silver medal – second place	2022 Račice	PR2 Mix2x
Bronze medal – third place	2007 Munich	TAMix2x
Bronze medal – third place	2009 Poznań	TAMix2x
Bronze medal – third place	2017 Sarasota	PR2 Mix2x
Bronze medal – third place	2018 Plovdiv	PR2 W1x
Bronze medal – third place	2023 Belgrade	PR2 Mix2x
European Championships
Bronze medal – third place	2020 Poznań	PR2 Mix2x
Bronze medal – third place	2022 Munich	PR2 Mix2x

Jolanta Majka (née Pawlak; born 13 July 1978) is a Polish adaptive rower and former Paralympic swimmer who competes at international level events. She is six-time World medalist and European silver medalist in rowing.

Majka has competed at four Paralympic Games in two different sports: swimming at the 2000 Summer Paralympics and rowing from 2008 Summer Paralympics to 2016 Summer Paralympics.
