= Iaroslav Koiuda =

Ukrainian Paralympic rower (born 1987)

Personal information
- Native name: Ярослав Каюда
- Born: 26 December 1987 (age 38)

Sport
- Country: Ukraine
- Sport: Pararowing
- Disability class: PR2
Medal record
Pararowing
Representing Ukraine
World Championships
| Gold medal – first place | 2022 Račice | PR2 Mix2x |
| Silver medal – second place | 2017 Sarasota | PR2 Mix2x |
| Bronze medal – third place | 2018 Plovdiv | PR2 Mix2x |
European Championships
| Silver medal – second place | 2020 Poznań | PR2 Mix2x |
| Silver medal – second place | 2025 Plovdiv | PR2 Mix2x |
| Silver medal – second place | 2026 Varese | PR2 Mix2x |
| Bronze medal – third place | 2023 Bled | PR2 Mix2x |
| Bronze medal – third place | 2024 Szeged | PR2 Mix2x |

Iaroslav Koiuda (Ukrainian: Ярослав Каюда; born 26 December 1987) is a Ukrainian pararower. He represented Ukraine at the 2016, 2020 and 2024 Summer Paralympics.

== Career ==
Koiuda competed at the 2022 World Rowing Championships and won a gold medal in the PR2 mixed double sculls, along with Svitlana Bohuslavska.

In April 2024, he competed at the 2024 European Rowing Championships and won a bronze medal in the PR2 mixed double sculls, along with Anna Aisanova. He then represented Ukraine at the 2024 Summer Paralympics and finished in fourth place in the PR2 mixed double sculls event, along with Aisanova.

In June 2025, he competed at the 2025 European Rowing Championships and won a silver medal in the PR2 mixed double sculls, along with Aisanova. He again competed at the 2026 European Rowing Championships and won a silver medal in the PR2 mixed double sculls, along with Aisanova, finishing 0.4 seconds behind the gold medal winning German team of Jasmina Bier and Paul Umbach.
