= Annika van der Meer =

Dutch rower

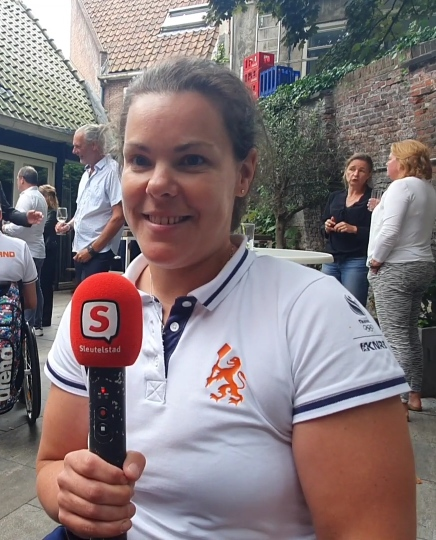

Personal information
- Born: 16 December 1985 (age 40) The Hague, Netherlands
- Height: 171 cm (5 ft 7 in)
- Weight: 67 kg (148 lb)

Sport
- Country: Netherlands
- Sport: Adaptive rowing
- Club: K.S.R.V. Njord
Medal record
Adaptive rowing
Representing Netherlands
Paralympic Games
Silver medal – second place	2020 Tokyo	PR2 Mix2x
World Championships
Gold medal – first place	2017 Sarasota	PR2 Mix2x
Gold medal – first place	2018 Plovdiv	PR2 Mix2x
Silver medal – second place	2018 Plovdiv	PR2 W1x
Silver medal – second place	2019 Ottensheim	PR2 Mix2x
Silver medal – second place	2019 Ottensheim	PR2 W1x
European Championships
Gold medal – first place	2020 Poznan	PR2 Mix2x
Silver medal – second place	2021 Varese	PR2 Mix2x

Annika van der Meer (born 16 December 1985) is a Dutch adaptive rower who competes at international level events. She is also a paracyclist and was a former field hockey player.

Van der Meer was involved in a serious skiing accident when she was 21 years old, she has impaired strength in the muscles and nerves of her right leg. She is a pediatric oncologist in a hospital in Utrecht.
