= List of LGBTQ Summer Olympians (2024–present) =

There are 87 (Note: Based on the information collected on this page) modern Summer Olympic athletes, who made their Olympic debut in 2024 and have identified as lesbian, gay, bisexual, transgender, pansexual, non-binary, queer, or have openly been in a same-sex relationship.

According to Outsports, there were at least 199 out athletes (including those who debuted earlier) at the 2024 Summer Olympics, which they reported as the most athletes competing in one edition of the Games who were widely out beforehand; Outsports also noted the record number of out male athletes, though most of the LGBTQ+ Olympians were female as in previous editions. In two women's team sport rosters, for United States women's basketball and Australia women's football, over half of the players were identified as LGBTQ (in the Australia football squad, it was two-thirds). German footballer Lena Oberdorf and Colombian skateboarder Jazmín Álvarez were both included in their respective Olympic teams, but both suffered ACL and MCL injuries shortly before being able to take part.

At least 28 LGBTQ+ Summer Olympians who debuted in 2024 are medalists (32.18%), of which 8 have at least one gold medal (9.20%).

== Overview ==
All based on the lists of LGBT Summer Olympians: 1896–2000; 2004–2020; 2024 (Note: These tables count all athletes who competed in 2024, including those who debuted earlier.)

By country
Country	Number of Olympians			
Country	F	M	NB	Total
Argentina	1	1	—	2
Australia	22	1	—	23
Austria	1	—	—	1
Belgium	4	1	—	5
Brazil	29	3	—	32
Canada	10	—	3	13
China	1 (Note: Alyson Annan previously represented Australia and the Netherlands, and represented China in 2024. She is only counted for China in this table.)	—	—	1
Colombia	4	—	—	4
Denmark	1	—	—	1
Finland	1	—	—	1
France	9	–	—	9
Germany	13	2	—	15
Great Britain	10	3	—	13
Ireland	2	1	—	3
Israel	2	—	—	2
Italy	3	—	—	3
Netherlands	8	2	—	10
New Zealand	5	2	—	7
Philippines	1	1	—	2
Puerto Rico	3	—	—	3
Refugee Olympic Team	1	—	—	1
South Africa	3	—	—	3
Spain	13 (Note: Yulenmis Aguilar represented Cuba previously, and Spain in 2024. She is only counted for Spain in this table.)	2	—	15
Sweden	1	—	—	1
Thailand	1	—	—	1
Trinidad and Tobago	1	—	—	1
Turkey	2	—	—	2
United States	33	3	3	39

By year
Games	Number of Olympians (Note: Including multi-year appearances of the same Olympian.)			
Games	F	M	NB	Total
2024 Summer	185	23	5	213

By sport
Sport	Number of Olympians by gender (Note: Including multi-disciplinary Olympians)							
Sport	Female			Male			Non-binary	Total
Sport	Cisgender	Transgender	Intersex	Cisgender	Transgender	Intersex	Non-binary	Total
Archery	1	—	—	—	—	—	–	1
Athletics	10	—	–	2	—	—	2 (Note: Competed in a women's category)	14
Badminton	1	—	—	—	—	—	–	1
Basketball	23	—	—	—	—	—	–	23
Beach volleyball	1	—	—	—	—	—	–	1
Boxing	8	—	—	—	1	—	—	9
Canoeing and Kayaking	1	—	—	—	—	—	—	1
Climbing	–	–	—	1	—	—	—	1
Cycling	7	–	—	—	—	—	—	7
Diving	—	—	—	1	—	—	—	1
Equestrian	1	—	—	8	—	—	—	9
Fencing	1	—	—	—	—	—	—	1
Football	47	—	—	–	—	—	1	48
Golf	2	—	—	—	—	—	—	2
Gymnastics	2	—	—	2	—	—	—	4
Handball	6	—	—	—	—	—	—	6
Hockey	16	—	—	1	—	—	—	17
Judo	6	—	—	1	—	—	—	7
Rowing	8	—	—	1	—	—	—	9
Rugby sevens	17	—	—	—	–	—	2	19
Sailing	1	—	—	—	—	—	–	1
Shooting	1	—	—	—	—	—	–	1
Skateboarding	1	—	—	—	—	—	–	1
Surfing	4	—	—	—	—	—	—	4
Swimming	2	—	—	2	—	—	—	4
Table tennis	1	—	—	–	—	—	—	1
Taekwondo	—	—	—	1	—	—	—	1
Tennis	2	—	—	–	—	—	—	2
Volleyball	9	—	—	2	—	—	—	11
Water polo	3	—	—	–	—	—	—	3
Weightlifting	1	—	—	–	—	—	—	1
Wrestling	2	—	—	–	—	—	—	2

== Summer Olympic athletes and coaches (2024–present) ==
Tables are default sorted by first Games appearance chronologically, then current surname or common nickname alphabetically, then first name alphabetically. They can be sorted by current surname (where used) or common nickname alphabetically; by country and sport alphabetically; by Games chronologically; (Note: Where athletes have represented multiple countries, competed in multiple sports, and/or at multiple Games, the country/sport/Games they are sorted by is their first country/sport/Games chronologically.) and by medals as organised in Olympics medals tables. (Note: Based on most golds over total medals, then alphabetically by current surname or common nickname. In cases of medals for demonstration events and honourable mentions in artistic events, these are sorted between one bronze and no medals.)

Athlete	Country	Sport	Games	Medal(s)	Notes
Laura Aarts	Netherlands	Water polo	2024	3rd place, bronze medalist(s)	
Teresa Abelleira	Spain	Football	2024		
Adriana	Brazil	Football	2024	2nd place, silver medalist(s)	
Nick Albiero	Brazil	Swimming	2024		
Laura Amaro	Brazil	Weightlifting	2024		
Amy Atwell	Australia	Basketball	2024	3rd place, bronze medalist(s)	Originally an alternate, Atwell joined the main squad after an injury withdrawal
Hergie Bacyadan	Philippines	Boxing	2024		Bacyadan is a transgender man, who has not undergone a medical transition and therefore competes in women's boxing. After cisgender female boxers at the 2024 Olympics were accused of being male, Bacyadan spoke up in support of them.
Kemisetso Baloyi	South Africa	Rugby	2024		
Ona Batlle	Spain	Football	2024		
Sarah Baum	South Africa	Surfing	2024		
Ann-Katrin Berger	Germany	Football	2024	3rd place, bronze medalist(s)	
Emily Bessoir	Germany	Basketball	2024		
Anastasia Blayvas	Germany	Wrestling	2024		
Wendy Bonilla	Colombia	Football	2024		Alternate in football squad
Svenja Brunckhorst	Germany	Basketball	2024	1st place, gold medalist(s)	
Emilie Bydwell	United States	Rugby	2024	3rd place, bronze medalist(s)	Team coach
Linda Caicedo	Colombia	Football	2024		
Paula Camus	Spain	Water polo	2024	1st place, gold medalist(s)	
Borja Carrascosa	Spain	Equestrian	2024		
Nina Castagna	United States	Rowing	2024		
Timo Cavelius	Germany	Judo	2024		
Teal Cohen	United States	Rowing	2024		
Cata Coll	Spain	Football	2024		
Kahleah Copper	United States	Basketball	2024	1st place, gold medalist(s)	
Sophie de Goede	Canada	Rugby	2024	2nd place, silver medalist(s)	
Sara Doorsoun	Germany	Football	2024	3rd place, bronze medalist(s)	
Rayan Dutra	Brazil	Gymnastics	2024		
Emily Ehrlich	United States	Cycling	2024		
Charlotte Englebert	Belgium	Hockey	2024		
Michaela Foster	New Zealand	Football	2024		Originally an alternate, Foster joined the main team after an injury withdrawal
Sharn Freier	Australia	Football	2024		
Maddy Grant	Canada	Rugby	2024	2nd place, silver medalist(s)	
Alina Hagstrom	United States	Rowing	2024		Alternate in participating team
Georgia Hall	Great Britain	Golf	2024		
Campbell Harrison	Australia	Climbing	2024		
Jenni Hermoso	Spain	Football	2024		
Nikki Hiltz	United States	Athletics	2024		
Ashley Hoffman	United States	Hockey	2024		
Asia Hogan-Rochester	Canada	Rugby	2024	2nd place, silver medalist(s)	
Marleen Jochems	Netherlands	Hockey	2024	1st place, gold medalist(s)	
Grace Joyce	United States	Rowing	2024		
Camilla Kemp	Germany	Surfing	2024		
Maëlle Lakrar	France	Football	2024		
Inès Lardeur	France	Hockey	2024		
Lauren	Brazil	Football	2024	2nd place, silver medalist(s)	Originally an alternate, Lauren joined the main squad
Alice Lesgourgues	France	Hockey	2024		Alternate in hockey squad
Lorena	Brazil	Football	2024	2nd place, silver medalist(s)	
Justin Lui	Canada	Volleyball	2024		
Anneli Maley	Australia	Basketball	2024		
Lauren Mansfield	Australia	Basketball	2024		
Cindy Ngamba	Refugee Olympic Team	Boxing	2024	3rd place, bronze medalist(s)	Ngamba is a refugee in the UK, and cannot return to her birth nation of Cameroon due to homosexuality being illegal there. She is part of GB Boxing, which supported her citizenship application, but was not granted British citizenship before the 2024 Games and so could not compete for Great Britain.
Yared Nuguse	United States	Athletics	2024	3rd place, bronze medalist(s)	
Mariona Ortiz	Spain	Basketball	2024		
Irene Paredes	Spain	Football	2024		
Alexis Peterson	Germany	Basketball	2024		
Mathilde Petriaux	France	Hockey	2024		Alternate in hockey squad
Pauline Peyraud-Magnin	France	Football	2024		
Constance Picaud	France	Football	2024		
Kayleigh Powell	Great Britain	Rugby	2024		Alternate in rugby squad
Miriam Pritchard	Great Britain	Hockey	2024		
Alexia Putellas	Spain	Football	2024		
Emma Puvrez	Belgium	Hockey	2024		
Chuthamat Raksat	Thailand	Boxing	2024		
Felicitas Rauch	Germany	Football	2024	3rd place, bronze medalist(s)	
Abigail Raye	Belgium	Hockey	2024		Alternate in hockey squad
Alba Redondo	Spain	Football	2024		Originally an alternate, Redondo joined the main squad
Cheryl Reeve	United States	Basketball	2024		Team coach. Had previously been assistant coach in 2016 and 2021.
Sha'Carri Richardson	United States	Athletics	2024	1st place, gold medalist(s) 2nd place, silver medalist(s)	
Sofía Roma	Puerto Rico	Basketball	2024		
Stephanie Rovetti	United States	Rugby	2024	3rd place, bronze medalist(s)	
Tabea Schendekehl	Germany	Rowing	2024	3rd place, bronze medalist(s)	
Lea Schüller	Germany	Football	2024	3rd place, bronze medalist(s)	
Lauren Scruggs	United States	Fencing	2024	1st place, gold medalist(s) 2nd place, silver medalist(s)	
Tainá	Brazil	Football	2024	2nd place, silver medalist(s)	
Tarciane	Brazil	Football	2024	2nd place, silver medalist(s)	
Alyssa Thomas	United States	Basketball	2024	1st place, gold medalist(s)	
Lowri Thomas	Great Britain	Cycling	2024		
Lauren Torley	Great Britain	Rugby	2024		
Melissa Vargas	Turkey	Volleyball	2024		
Cortnee Vine	Australia	Football	2024		
Frederic Wandres	Germany	Equestrian	2024	1st place, gold medalist(s)	
Sami Whitcomb	Australia	Basketball	2024	3rd place, bronze medalist(s)	
Marena Whittle	Australia	Basketball	2024		
Marissa Williamson Pohlman	Australia	Boxing	2024		
Alex Wilson	Australia	Basketball	2024		
Tyler Wright	Australia	Surfing	2024		
Nico Young	United States	Athletics	2024		
