= List of LGBTQ Summer Olympians (2004–2020) =

There are 434 (Note: Based on the information collected on this page) modern Summer Olympic athletes who made their Olympic debut between the 2004 and 2020 Games, inclusive, who have identified as lesbian, gay, bisexual, transgender, pansexual, non-binary, queer, or who have openly been in a same-sex relationship, including one who has also competed at the Winter Olympic Games.

LGBTQ+ Summer Olympians who hold Olympic records include footballers Pia Sundhage and Vivianne Miedema; (Note: Pia Sundhage holds all coaching records. Vivianne Miedema has scored the most goals of an individual player in a single Olympic Games and in a single Olympic match. See List of women's Olympic football tournament records and statistics.) rower Emma Twigg; (Note: See List of Olympic best times in rowing) and triple jumper Yulimar Rojas, who also holds the world record. (Note: See List of Olympic records in athletics and Triple jump world record progression.) At least 177 LGBTQ+ Summer Olympians who debuted 2004–2020 are medalists (40.78%), of whom 74 have at least one gold medal (17.05%). (Note: This does not include medals won between 2004–2021 by athletes who debuted earlier.)

== Overview ==
All based on the lists of LGBT Summer Olympians: 1896–2000; 2004–2020 (Note: These tables count all athletes who competed between 2004 and 2021, including those who debuted earlier.)

By country
Country	Number of Olympians			
Country	F	M	NB	Total
Argentina	7	1	—	8
Australia	33 (Note: Alyson Annan represented Australia up to 2000, and the Netherlands thereafter. She is only counted for the Netherlands in this table.)	5	—	38
Austria	2 (Note: Jolanta Ogar represented both Poland and Austria, and is counted for both.)	1	—	3
Belarus	1	—	—	1
Belgium	7	1	—	8
Brazil	42 (Note: Pia Sundhage has represented Sweden, the United States, and Brazil, all in this period, and is counted for all.)	5	—	47
Canada	32	3	1	36
Chile	3	1	—	4
China	1	—	—	1
Colombia	3	—	—	3
Cuba	1	—	—	1
Cyprus	1	—	—	1
Denmark	5	1	—	6
Finland	2	1	—	3
France	10	2	—	12
Germany	22	1	—	23
Great Britain	41 (Note: Hege Riise represented Norway up to 2000, and Great Britain in 2020. She is only counted for Great Britain in this table.)	8	—	49
Greece	2	—	—	2
India	1	—	—	1
Ireland	3	3	—	6
Israel	4	—	—	4
Italy	7	1	—	8
Mexico	2	—	—	2
Netherlands	25	6	—	31
New Zealand	19	4	—	23
Nigeria	1	—	—	1
Norway	6	—	—	6
Peru	1	—	—	1
Philippines	3	—	—	3
Poland	4	—	—	4
Puerto Rico	4	—	—	4
ROC (Note: Including Russia)	3	—	—	3
South Africa	13	—	—	13
Spain	6	4	—	10
Sweden	22	—	—	22
Tonga	—	1	—	1
Trinidad and Tobago	1	—	—	1
Turkey	1	—	—	1
United States	68	8	5	81
Venezuela	1	2	—	3
Zimbabwe	—	1	—	1

By year
Games	Number of Olympians (Note: Including multi-year appearances of the same Olympian.)			
Games	F	M	NB	Total
2004 Summer	47	13	—	60
2008 Summer	82	11	—	93
2012 Summer	113	15	—	128
2016 Summer	171	33	2	206
2020 Summer (Note: Took place in 2021 due to the COVID-19 pandemic.)	245	24	6	275

By sport
Sport	Number of Olympians by gender (Note: Including multi-disciplinary Olympians)							
Sport	Female			Male			Non-binary	Total
Sport	Cisgender	Transgender	Intersex	Cisgender	Transgender	Intersex	Non-binary	Total
Archery	3	—	—	—	—	—	—	3
Athletics	22	—	2	6	—	—	1	31
Badminton	4	—	—	—	—	—	—	4
Basketball	31	—	—	—	—	—	1 (Note: Competed in a women's category)	32
Beach volleyball	7	—	—	—	—	—	—	7
Boxing	10	—	—	—	—	—	—	10
Canoeing and Kayaking	4	—	—	—	—	—	—	4
Cycling	13	1	—	—	—	—	—	14
Diving	—	—	—	7	—	—	—	7
Equestrian	1	—	—	13	—	—	—	14
Fencing	3	—	—	—	—	—	—	3
Football	146	—	—	1	—	—	1	148
Golf	2	—	—	—	—	—	—	2
Gymnastics	8	—	—	7	—	—	—	15
Handball	16	—	—	—	—	—	—	16
Hockey	20	—	—	2	—	—	—	22
Judo	12	—	—	—	—	—	—	12
Rowing	9	—	—	4	—	—	—	13
Rugby sevens	24	—	—	—	1	—	1	26
Sailing	3	—	—	—	—	—	—	3
Shooting	4	—	—	—	—	—	—	4
Skateboarding	6	—	—	—	—	—	2	8
Softball	11	—	—	—	—	—	—	11
Surfing	3	—	—	—	—	—	—	3
Swimming	6	—	—	13	—	—	—	19
Table tennis	1	—	—	—	1	—	—	2
Taekwondo	1	—	—	1	—	—	—	2
Tennis	14	—	—	—	—	—	—	14
Triathlon	2	—	—	1	—	—	—	3
Volleyball	14	—	—	2	—	—	—	16
Water polo	2	—	—	1	—	—	—	3
Weightlifting	—	1	—	—	—	—	—	1
Wrestling	1	—	—	—	—	—	—	1

== Key ==
Δ Was known to be widely out prior to their most recent Summer Olympic competition; contemporaneously out while competing

† Came out after competing

- Tables are default sorted by first Games appearance chronologically, then current surname or common nickname alphabetically, then first name alphabetically. They can be sorted by current surname (where used) or common nickname alphabetically; by country and sport alphabetically; by Games chronologically; (Note: Where athletes have represented multiple countries, competed in multiple sports, and/or at multiple Games, the country/sport/Games they are sorted by is their first country/sport/Games chronologically.) and by medals as organised in Olympics medals tables. (Note: Based on most golds over total medals, then alphabetically by current surname or common nickname. In cases of medals for demonstration events and honourable mentions in artistic events, these are sorted between one bronze and no medals.)

== Summer Olympic athletes and coaches (2004–2020) ==
Athlete	Country	Sport	Games	Medal(s)	Notes
Maja Åström	Sweden	Football	2004		
Sue Bird	United States	Basketball	2004, 2008, 2012, 2016, 2020	1st place, gold medalist(s)	Came out publicly in 2017, encouraged by her partner, Megan Rapinoe. Bird was chosen as a flag bearer for the 2020 Games.
Giorgia Bronzini	Italy	Cycling	2004, 2012, 2016		Married a woman in 2019.
Darren Chiacchia	United States	Equestrian	2004	3rd place, bronze medalist(s)	After competing, Chiacchia drew attention due to a high-profile felony case which alleged he exposed a former partner to HIV; this was ultimately dropped.
Cristiane	Brazil	Football	2004, 2008, 2012, 2016	2nd place, silver medalist(s)	
Chantal de Bruijn	Netherlands	Hockey	2004	2nd place, silver medalist(s)	
Angela Hucles	United States	Football	2004, 2008	1st place, gold medalist(s)	
Tanya Kalivas	Greece	Football	2004		
Dominik Koll	Austria	Swimming	2004, 2008		Came out widely in 2013.
Kylie Ledbrook	Australia	Football	2004		
Hedvig Lindahl	Sweden	Football	2004, 2008, 2012, 2016, 2020	2nd place, silver medalist(s)	Was widely out before 2011. Lindahl was an alternate at the 2004 Games.
Marta	Brazil	Football	2004, 2008, 2012, 2016, 2020, 2024	2nd place, silver medalist(s)	Got engaged to teammate Toni Pressley in January 2021.
Leigh-Ann Naidoo	South Africa	Beach volleyball	2004		Was widely out prior to competing.
Martina Navratilova	United States	Tennis	2004		Navratilova was outed as bisexual in 1981; she later identified herself as a lesbian. A prominent campaigner for gay rights in the 1990s, since 2019 Navratilova has spoken against allowing transgender women to compete, to varying degrees, and faced criticism within LGBT+ sporting communities for some comments. She also faced criticism for making the comments despite having been coached by (and having won against) transgender tennis star Renée Richards, a prominent campaigner who fought for and was allowed to play on the women's tour. She does propose finding new ways to including transgender athletes in sports.
Robert Newton	Great Britain	Athletics	2004		Newton was Great Britain's only openly gay athlete in 2004.
Lisa Raymond	United States	Tennis	2004, 2012	3rd place, bronze medalist(s)	Was previously in a relationship with Rennae Stubbs, though was widely out before Stubbs came out in 2006.
Lotta Schelin	Sweden	Football	2004, 2008, 2012, 2016	2nd place, silver medalist(s)	Came out widely in 2018.
Sally Shipard	Australia	Football	2004		
Rikke Skov	Denmark	Handball	2004, 2012	1st place, gold medalist(s)	Began openly dating Lotte Kiærskou after joining the Viborg HK handball team in 2003; they split in 2011.
Laís Souza	Brazil	Gymnastics	2004, 2008		After competing as a gymnast in 2004 and 2008, but missing out in 2012 due to a fractured hand, Souza was introduced to aerial skiing by the Brazilian Olympic Committee; they wanted to have a Winter Olympics presence and planned to use gymnasts to execute the tricks. Souza excelled and qualified as Brazil's only athlete in the discipline for the 2014 Winter Olympics. A week before the Games she became quadriplegic in a ski accident on a leisure run. She came out in 2015.
Marianne Steinbrecher	Brazil	Volleyball	2004, 2008	1st place, gold medalist(s)	Steinbrecher came out when the newspaper Extra reported on her and her girlfriend in 2017.
Samantha Stosur	Australia	Tennis	2004, 2008, 2012, 2016, 2020		Widely out prior to the 2020 Games.
Diana Taurasi	United States	Basketball	2004, 2008, 2012, 2016, 2020, 2024	1st place, gold medalist(s)	Married Penny Taylor in 2017.
Penny Taylor	Australia	Basketball	2004, 2008, 2016	2nd place, silver medalist(s)	Married Diana Taurasi in 2017.
Sara Thunebro	Sweden	Football	2004, 2008, 2012		
Sunette Viljoen	South Africa	Athletics	2004, 2008, 2012, 2016	2nd place, silver medalist(s)	Widely out prior to 2016.
Sarah Walsh	Australia	Football	2004		
Lisa Walton	New Zealand	Hockey	2004		
Abby Wambach	United States	Football	2004, 2012	1st place, gold medalist(s)	Married a woman in 2013, saying at the time that she did not think her marriage represented coming out as she had never felt in a closet.
Seimone Augustus	United States	Basketball	2008, 2012, 2016	1st place, gold medalist(s)	Was widely out prior to 2012.
Bárbara	Brazil	Football	2008, 2012, 2016, 2020	2nd place, silver medalist(s)	Widely out by 2019.
Nicole Branagh	United States	Beach volleyball	2008		
Linda Bresonik	Germany	Football	2008	3rd place, bronze medalist(s)	Had a highly-documented relationship with Inka Grings prior to competing.
Cecilia Carranza Saroli	Argentina	Sailing	2008, 2012, 2016, 2020	1st place, gold medalist(s)	Widely out by the 2020 Games, at which she was selected as a flag bearer.
Kerron Clement	United States	Athletics	2008, 2012, 2016	1st place, gold medalist(s) 2nd place, silver medalist(s)	Came out in 2019.
Vanina Correa	Argentina	Football	2008		
Ana Marcela Cunha	Brazil	Swimming	2008, 2016, 2020, 2024	1st place, gold medalist(s)	Widely out by the 2020 Games.
Tom Daley	Great Britain	Diving	2008, 2012, 2016, 2020, 2024	1st place, gold medalist(s) 2nd place, silver medalist(s) 3rd place, bronze medalist(s)	Daley spoke about being in a relationship with a man in 2013, not identifying his sexuality; when asked in 2015 he said he also had an attraction to women, and labelled himself queer in 2018. At the 2020 Games, he described himself as gay. In 2021, he began campaigning for homophobic nations to be banned from the Olympics. In 2022, he criticized FINA for imposing restrictions on transgender athletes.
Casey Dellacqua	Australia	Tennis	2008, 2012		Came out widely in 2013.
Katie Duncan	New Zealand	Football	2008, 2012, 2016		Married to teammate Priscilla Duncan.
Andri Eleftheriou	Cyprus	Shooting	2008, 2016, 2020		Selected as a flag bearer for the 2020 Games, at which point she was widely out.
Abby Erceg	New Zealand	Football	2008, 2012, 2016, 2020		Widely out by the 2020 Games.
Nilla Fischer	Sweden	Football	2008, 2012, 2016	2nd place, silver medalist(s)	Came out publicly in 2013.
Larissa França	Brazil	Beach volleyball	2008, 2012, 2016	3rd place, bronze medalist(s)	Came out publicly and married fellow player Liliane Maestrini in 2013.
Francielle	Brazil	Football	2008, 2012	2nd place, silver medalist(s)	Francielle is married to Andressa Alves.
Vicky Galindo	United States	Softball	2008	2nd place, silver medalist(s)	Was widely out as bisexual prior to competing.
Gro Hammerseng	Norway	Handball	2008	1st place, gold medalist(s)	Was widely out prior to competing, and lived with teammate Katja Nyberg for many years before they separated in 2010.
Becky Hammon	Russia	Basketball	2008, 2012	3rd place, bronze medalist(s)	Born in the United States, Hammon had previously represented them in other events, later becoming a successful coach in her native country.
Jessica Harrison	France	Triathlon	2008, 2012		Harrison has been openly in a relationship with fellow French triathlete Carole Péon since 2005.
Tobin Heath	United States	Football	2008, 2012, 2016, 2020	1st place, gold medalist(s) 3rd place, bronze medalist(s)	In a relationship with teammate Christen Press.
Isabell Herlovsen	Norway	Football	2008		Came out publicly in 2011.
Ursula Holl	Germany	Football	2008	3rd place, bronze medalist(s)	Served as the reserve goalkeeper, not playing. Married a woman in 2010.
Diego Hypólito	Brazil	Gymnastics	2008, 2012, 2016	2nd place, silver medalist(s)	Came out in 2019, saying he had struggled with being gay for years due to his religious upbringing.
Natasha Kai	United States	Football	2008	1st place, gold medalist(s)	Was widely out prior to competing.
Emma Kete	New Zealand	Football	2008		
Alexandra Lacrabère	France	Handball	2008, 2012, 2016, 2020	1st place, gold medalist(s) 2nd place, silver medalist(s)	
Jessica Landström	Sweden	Football	2008, 2012		Came out in 2008. In 2012, Landström was an alternate and did not play.
Lauren Lappin	United States	Softball	2008	2nd place, silver medalist(s)	Lappin, who is openly lesbian, was reportedly inspired to come out after teammate Vicky Galindo did.
Diana Matheson	Canada	Football	2008, 2012, 2016	3rd place, bronze medalist(s)	In a relationship with Anastasia Bucsis.
Erin McLeod	Canada	Football	2008, 2012, 2020	1st place, gold medalist(s) 3rd place, bronze medalist(s)	Selected as a reserve in 2020, she was included on the team sheet for one match. McLeod came out publicly to voice her opposition to the 2014 Winter Olympics being held in homophobic Russia.
Hans Peter Minderhoud	Netherlands	Equestrian	2008, 2016, 2020, 2024	2nd place, silver medalist(s)	Has been in a relationship with teammate Edward Gal since before 2010.
Matthew Mitcham	Australia	Diving	2008, 2012	1st place, gold medalist(s)	Reportedly the first openly gay Olympian to win a gold medal when he did in 2008. He had come out shortly before the Games that year in an interview profiling the athletes. He attracted media attention in Australia under the perception of being the nation's first gay Olympian, though the media soon amended to note that other divers, Craig Rogerson and Mathew Helm, had been out when they competed.
Nina Müller	Germany	Handball	2008		Competed as Nina Wörz.
Katja Nyberg	Norway	Handball	2008	1st place, gold medalist(s)	Was widely out prior to competing, and lived with teammate Gro Hammerseng for many years before they separated in 2010.
Tzipora Obziler	Israel	Tennis	2008		Was widely out before competing.
Candace Parker	United States	Basketball	2008, 2012	1st place, gold medalist(s)	In 2021, on their wedding anniversary, Parker and Anna Petrakova announced they had married in 2019. They had kept their relationship covert in part due to homophobia in Russia.
Maartje Paumen	Netherlands	Hockey	2008, 2012, 2016	1st place, gold medalist(s) 2nd place, silver medalist(s)	Came out in 2011.
Fiona Pennie	Great Britain	Canoeing	2008, 2016		
Carole Péon	France	Triathlon	2008, 2012		Péon has been openly in a relationship with fellow French triathlete Jessica Harrison since 2005.
Ria Percival	New Zealand	Football	2008, 2012, 2016, 2020		
Babett Peter	Germany	Football	2008, 2016	1st place, gold medalist(s) 3rd place, bronze medalist(s)	
Erin Phillips	Australia	Basketball	2008, 2016	2nd place, silver medalist(s)	Married American basketball player Tracy Gahan in 2014.
Robbie Rogers	United States	Football	2008		Came out widely in 2013.
Trine Rønning	Norway	Football	2008		
Kamilla Rytter Juhl	Denmark	Badminton	2008, 2012, 2016	2nd place, silver medalist(s)	Rytter Juhl has been in a relationship with fellow badminton player Christinna Pedersen since 2009.
Caroline Seger	Sweden	Football	2008, 2012, 2016, 2020	2nd place, silver medalist(s)	Came out in 2013. Seger used to date teammate Malin Levenstad.
Katarzyna Skorupa	Poland	Volleyball	2008		Skorupa is in a relationship with Paola Egonu, which they made public in 2018.
Katsiaryna Snytsina	Belarus	Basketball	2008, 2016		Snytsina competed for Belarus in 2008 and was their star in 2016, before protesting against her government and coming out in 2020, leading to her being labelled an extremist and living in exile in London.
Ingvild Stensland	Norway	Football	2008		
Beth Storry	Great Britain	Hockey	2008, 2012	3rd place, bronze medalist(s)	
Carla Suárez	Spain	Tennis	2008, 2012, 2016, 2020		Widely out prior to the 2020 Games.
Melissa Tancredi	Canada	Football	2008, 2012, 2016	3rd place, bronze medalist(s)	Widely out prior to 2016 Games.
Elise Thorsnes	Norway	Football	2008		
Ellen Tomek	United States	Rowing	2008, 2016, 2020		Widely out prior to the 2020 Games.
Emma Twigg	New Zealand	Rowing	2008, 2012, 2016, 2020, 2024	1st place, gold medalist(s) 2nd place, silver medalist(s)	Twigg came out publicly in the years before her fourth Olympics, saying she had wanted to wait until she had a girlfriend she could announce to do so. She spoke with OutSports about how she felt it was important she was out going into those Games.
Linda Villumsen	New Zealand	Cycling	2008, 2012, 2016		Widely out before 2016 Games.
Marianne Vos	Netherlands	Cycling	2008, 2012, 2016, 2020, 2024	1st place, gold medalist(s) 2nd place, silver medalist(s)	
Rhian Wilkinson	Canada	Football	2008, 2012, 2016	3rd place, bronze medalist(s)	Wilkinson also served as assistant coach to the Great Britain women's Olympic football team at the 2020 Games. In 2022, she was asked to resign as coach of the Portland Thorns following an inappropriate relationship with a player.
Kirsty Yallop	New Zealand	Football	2008, 2012, 2016		Became engaged to Tameka Yallop in 2017.
Nicola Adams	Great Britain	Boxing	2012, 2016	1st place, gold medalist(s)	Was widely out prior to competing.
Michelle-Lee Ahye	Trinidad and Tobago	Athletics	2012, 2016, 2020, 2024		Ahye is openly lesbian. She was on the list for the 2020 Games, but did not start due to a ban for missing random drugs tests.
Geisa Arcanjo	Brazil	Athletics	2012, 2016, 2020		Widely out prior to the 2020 Games.
Anita Asante	Great Britain	Football	2012		
Karen Bardsley	Great Britain	Football	2012		
Dirkie Chamberlain	South Africa	Hockey	2012, 2024		
Rose Cossar	Canada	Gymnastics	2012		Cossar came out publicly in 2014 upon the announcement that she would be a spokesperson for the Canadian Olympic Committee in its new program to combat homophobia in sports. She had already been out within her sport for several years. Since the 2012 Olympics, she has worked with Toronto's The 519 Church Street Community Centre on the creation of Pride House Toronto.
Lisa Dahlkvist	Sweden	Football	2012, 2016	2nd place, silver medalist(s)	Came out in 2008.
Debinha	Brazil	Football	2012, 2016, 2020		Widely out prior to the 2020 Games.
Elisa Di Francisca	Italy	Fencing	2012, 2016	1st place, gold medalist(s) 2nd place, silver medalist(s)	Married her husband in 2019, discussed a previous relationship with a woman in 2021.
Alex Di Giorgio	Italy	Swimming	2012, 2016		Di Giorgio was outed by an ex-boyfriend; he has spoken to the media about experiencing homophobia in Italy's swimming community.
Carlien Dirkse van den Heuvel	Netherlands	Hockey	2012, 2016	1st place, gold medalist(s) 2nd place, silver medalist(s)	Was widely out prior to competing.
Céline Dumerc	France	Basketball	2012, 2020	2nd place, silver medalist(s)	Dumerc won a silver medal as a player in 2012, and also served as manager in 2020. She was widely out by the 2020 Games.
Crystal Emmanuel-Ahye	Canada	Athletics	2012, 2016, 2020, 2024		
Amini Fonua	Tonga	Swimming	2012, 2016, 2020		Widely out prior to 2013.
Edward Gal	Netherlands	Equestrian	2012, 2016, 2020, 2024	3rd place, bronze medalist(s)	Has been in a relationship with teammate Hans Peter Minderhoud since before 2010.
Regina George	Nigeria	Athletics	2012		Made public her relationship with Inika McPherson in 2014.
Élodie Godin	France	Basketball	2012	2nd place, silver medalist(s)	Came out in 2014.
Tomás González	Chile	Gymnastics	2012, 2016, 2020	1st place, gold medalist(s)	Came out in 2023.
Sarah Gregorius	New Zealand	Football	2012, 2016		One of New Zealand's most experienced international footballers, after retirement Gregorius became a football executive, notably involved in replacing OneLove and rainbow armbands at the 2023 FIFA Women's World Cup.
Astrid Guyart	France	Fencing	2012, 2016, 2020	2nd place, silver medalist(s)	Widely out prior to competing.
Karen Hultzer	South Africa	Archery	2012		Came out in the run-up to the 2012 Games.
Refiloe Jane	South Africa	Football	2012, 2016		
Luca Kumahara	Brazil	Table tennis	2012, 2016, 2020		Widely out (as queer) prior to the 2020 Games. Publicly came out as transgender in 2022.
Kim Lammers	Netherlands	Hockey	2012	1st place, gold medalist(s)	Came out in the run-up to the 2012 Games, reportedly making the Dutch women's hockey team the most out.
Martha McCabe	Canada	Swimming	2012, 2016		
Theresa Michalak	Germany	Swimming	2012		
Holly Lam-Moores	Great Britain	Handball	2012		
Malin Levenstad	Sweden	Football	2012		Levenstad used to date teammate Caroline Seger.
Danell Leyva	United States	Gymnastics	2012, 2016	2nd place, silver medalist(s) 3rd place, bronze medalist(s)	Came out in 2020.
Lori Lindsey	United States	Football	2012		Selected as an alternate. Came out widely after the Games in 2012.
Ari-Pekka Liukkonen	Finland	Swimming	2012, 2016, 2020		Came out in 2014.
Annalie Longo	New Zealand	Football	2012, 2016, 2020, 2024		
Sofía Maccari	Argentina	Hockey	2012, 2020	2nd place, silver medalist(s)	Widely out prior to the 2020 Games.
Robbie Manson	New Zealand	Rowing	2012, 2016, 2024		Came out in 2014.
Angel McCoughtry	United States	Basketball	2012, 2016	1st place, gold medalist(s)	Came out in 2015.
Portia Modise	South Africa	Football	2012		Having previously quit the national team because of the coach, who was accused of sexual harassment and homophobia, she returned for the 2012 Games when a new coach was put in place. She has been an advocate for protections of lesbians in South Africa.
Daniela Montoya	Colombia	Football	2012, 2024		
Robyn Moodaly	South Africa	Football	2012, 2016		
Carmelina Moscato	Canada	Football	2012	3rd place, bronze medalist(s)	Engaged to a woman as of 2021.
Nadine Müller	Germany	Athletics	2012, 2016		Married a woman in 2013.
Marie-Ève Nault	Canada	Football	2012, 2016	3rd place, bronze medalist(s)	Widely out prior to 2016.
Erin Nayler	New Zealand	Football	2012, 2016, 2020		
Jolanta Ogar	Poland / Austria	Sailing	2012, 2016, 2020	2nd place, silver medalist(s)	Represented Poland in 2012 and 2020, and Austria in 2016. Widely out prior to competing, Ogar has taken part in the Polish #SportAgainstHomophobia campaign launched by the Campaign Against Homophobia.
Kelley O'Hara	United States	Football	2012, 2016, 2020	1st place, gold medalist(s) 3rd place, bronze medalist(s)	Widely out prior to the 2020 Games.
Robert Páez	Venezuela	Diving	2012		Came out in 2018.
Christinna Pedersen	Denmark	Badminton	2012, 2016	2nd place, silver medalist(s) 3rd place, bronze medalist(s)	
Mayssa Pessoa	Brazil	Handball	2012, 2016		Was widely out prior to competing.
Anna Petrakova	Russia	Basketball	2012		In 2021, on their wedding anniversary, Petrakova and Candace Parker announced they had married in 2019. They had kept their relationship covert in part due to homophobia in Russia.
Christen Press	United States	Football	2012, 2016, 2020	1st place, gold medalist(s) 3rd place, bronze medalist(s)	In a relationship with teammate Tobin Heath.
Megan Rapinoe	United States	Football	2012, 2016, 2020	1st place, gold medalist(s) 3rd place, bronze medalist(s)	Came out publicly in 2012, just before the Games.
Yoreli Rincón	Colombia	Football	2012		
Alex Scott	Great Britain	Football	2012		In her 2022 autobiography, Scott revealed that she had previously been in a relationship with teammate Kelly Smith. A further statement clarified that Scott does not label her sexuality, but dates men and women, and mentioned the relationship in her book for completeness rather than as a coming out.
Jill Scott	Great Britain	Football	2012, 2020		Widely out prior to competing.
Linda Sembrant	Sweden	Football	2012, 2016	2nd place, silver medalist(s)	
Caster Semenya	South Africa	Athletics	2012, 2016	1st place, gold medalist(s)	Semenya is an intersex woman with XY chromosomes; she also has a wife. She won a gold medal in 2012 after the original medalist was disqualified for doping; she repeated the gold medal win in 2016. See also List of intersex Olympians
Rafaela Silva	Brazil	Judo	2012, 2016, 2024	1st place, gold medalist(s) 3rd place, bronze medalist(s)	Came out during the 2016 Games, after winning her gold medal.
Kelly Smith	Great Britain	Football	2012		Was previously in a relationship with teammate Alex Scott. Married a woman in 2016.
Casey Stoney	Great Britain	Football	2012		Stoney was widely known to be a lesbian by 2012, though only labelled herself publicly in 2014.
Jérémy Stravius	France	Swimming	2012, 2016	1st place, gold medalist(s) 2nd place, silver medalist(s)	Came out widely in 2021.
Martina Strutz	Germany	Athletics	2012, 2016		Married a woman in 2015.
Annica Svensson	Sweden	Football	2012		
Lara Vadlau	Austria	Sailing	2012, 2016, 2024	1st place, gold medalist(s)	
Marleen van Iersel	Netherlands	Beach volleyball	2012, 2016		Married a woman in 2016.
Charline Van Snick	Belgium	Judo	2012, 2016, 2020	3rd place, bronze medalist(s)	
Janine van Wyk	South Africa	Football	2012, 2016		
Rowie Webster	Australia	Water polo	2012, 2016, 2020	3rd place, bronze medalist(s)	Widely out prior to the 2020 Games.
Hannah Wilkinson	New Zealand	Football	2012, 2016, 2020		Widely out prior to the 2020 Games.
Fara Williams	Great Britain	Football	2012		Married a woman in 2015; Williams said she did not intend to come out but knew her marriage would be public and that, though they have since separated, she is proud of it.
Lily Zhang	United States	Table tennis	2012, 2016, 2020, 2024		
Yulenmis Aguilar	Cuba / Spain	Athletics	2016, 2024		
Aline	Brazil	Football	2016, 2020		Widely out prior to the 2020 Games.
Andressa Alves	Brazil	Football	2016, 2020		Widely out prior to competing, Alves is married to Francielle.
Emanuel Andrade	Venezuela	Equestrian	2016		Came out in 2018.
Rebeca Andrade	Brazil	Gymnastics	2016, 2020, 2024	1st place, gold medalist(s) 2nd place, silver medalist(s) 3rd place, bronze medalist(s)	
Bárbara Arenhart	Brazil	Handball	2016, 2020, 2024		Widely out prior to 2019, when she said that coming out in sport shouldn't be taboo.
Mackenzie Arnold	Australia	Football	2016, 2020, 2024		
Shawnacy Barber	Canada	Athletics	2016		Came out in 2017.
Brittany Benn	Canada	Rugby	2016, 2020	3rd place, bronze medalist(s)	Widely out prior to 2020 Games.
Lucilla Boari	Italy	Archery	2016, 2020	3rd place, bronze medalist(s)	Announced her relationship with Sanne de Laat after winning her medal at the 2020 Games.
Tom Bosworth	Great Britain	Athletics	2016, 2020		Bosworth came out on television in 2015, saying that he had been out within his sport for years already. He proposed to his long-term boyfriend during the Rio Olympics in 2016.
Maxim Bouchard	Canada	Diving	2016		Came out before qualifying for the Games, and discussed this widely in 2024.
Kelly Brazier	New Zealand	Rugby	2016, 2020	1st place, gold medalist(s) 2nd place, silver medalist(s)	Widely out prior to competing.
Gayle Broughton	New Zealand	Rugby	2016, 2020	1st place, gold medalist(s) 2nd place, silver medalist(s)	Widely out prior to 2020 Games.
Rachele Bruni	Italy	Swimming	2016, 2020	2nd place, silver medalist(s)	Widely out prior to competing.
Kadeisha Buchanan	Canada	Football	2016, 2020, 2024	1st place, gold medalist(s) 3rd place, bronze medalist(s)	Widely out by 2020 Games.
Anne Buijs	Netherlands	Volleyball	2016, 2024		Widely out prior to competing.
Ellie Carpenter	Australia	Football	2016, 2020, 2024		In a relationship with Daniëlle van de Donk.
Peter Caruth	Ireland	Hockey	2016		Came out widely in 2022.
Isadora Cerullo	Brazil	Rugby	2016, 2020		Cerullo was notably proposed to by her girlfriend, a volunteer working at the Games, on the pitch in 2016.
Dutee Chand	India	Athletics	2016, 2020		Chand experiences hyperandrogenism and is a lesbian. She announced the latter in 2019 after India decriminalised gay sex, however, she was still expelled from her hometown. See also List of intersex Olympians
Larissa Crummer	Australia	Football	2016		
Søren Dahl	Denmark	Swimming	2016		
Katy Daley-McLean	Great Britain	Rugby	2016		
Gabriela DeBues-Stafford	Canada	Athletics	2016, 2020		DeBues-Stafford is openly bisexual and chose to dye her hair in rainbow colours throughout the 2021 athletics season, including the 2020 Games, to reflect the rainbow flag and as a way to get around Olympic rules regarding outfit and demonstrations. Competed as Gabriela Stafford in 2016 before marrying her husband in 2019.
Elena Delle Donne	United States	Basketball	2016	1st place, gold medalist(s)	Widely out prior to competing.
Lauren Doyle	United States	Rugby	2016, 2020, 2024	3rd place, bronze medalist(s)	Widely out by the 2020 Games.
Cathrine Laudrup-Dufour	Denmark	Equestrian	2016, 2020, 2024	2nd place, silver medalist(s)	Widely out by the 2020 Games.
Paola Egonu	Italy	Volleyball	2016, 2020, 2024	1st place, gold medalist(s)	Selected as a flagbearer at the 2020 Games. Egonu is in a relationship with Katarzyna Skorupa, which they made public in 2018.
Jill Ellis	United States	Football	2016		The British-American head coach of the US women's team in 2016, Ellis was first involved with this team as a scout for the 2000 Olympic Games and was the assistant coach under Pia Sundhage when they took the gold medal in 2008 and 2012. Ellis left the national team in 2019. She married her wife in 2013.
Magdalena Eriksson	Sweden	Football	2016, 2020	2nd place, silver medalist(s)	Widely out prior to competing, and an LGBTQ+ sports advocate with partner Pernille Harder.
Lucía Fresco	Argentina	Volleyball	2016		
Caitlin Foord	Australia	Football	2016, 2020, 2024		
Yarden Gerbi	Israel	Judo	2016	3rd place, bronze medalist(s)	
Emily Gielnik	Australia	Football	2016, 2020		Gielnik was an alternate in 2016. Widely out prior to the 2020 Games.
Kirsty Gilmour	Great Britain	Badminton	2016, 2020, 2024		Came out widely after the 2020 Games in 2021.
Xantal Giné	Spain	Hockey	2016, 2020, 2024		
Katrina Gorry	Australia	Football	2016, 2024		
Jasmin Grabowski	Germany	Judo	2016, 2020	3rd place, bronze medalist(s)	Widely out prior to the 2020 Games. Competed as Jasmin Külbs (or Kuelbs).
Gabriela Guimarães	Brazil	Volleyball	2016, 2020, 2024	2nd place, silver medalist(s) 3rd place, bronze medalist(s)	
Ellia Green	Australia	Rugby	2016	1st place, gold medalist(s)	Green competed in women's rugby and came out as a trans man in 2022 after his transition and after retiring in 2021. In coming out, he criticised World Rugby for implementing new bans on trans women in rugby union, saying that facing coming out as trans can already lead to mental ill health and being excluded only adds to this. It was initially reported that Green was the first Olympian to come out as a trans man, despite Balian Buschbaum having done so in 2007.
Kelly Griffin	United States	Rugby	2016		Widely out prior to competing.
Brittney Griner	United States	Basketball	2016, 2020, 2024	1st place, gold medalist(s)	Griner came out publicly in 2013. She married basketball player Glory Johnson in 2015; they separated less than a month later. Griner married Cherelle Watson in 2019.
Sean Gunn	Zimbabwe	Swimming	2016		Came out in 2024.
Víctor Gutiérrez	Spain	Water polo	2016		Gutiérrez came out shortly before the Olympics in 2016, and was named to the squad but did not compete.
Nathalie Hagman	Sweden	Handball	2016, 2020, 2024		Widely out prior to 2020 Games.
Ashlyn Harris	United States	Football	2016		Harris was a reserve goalkeeper at the 2016 Games. She and Ali Krieger married in December 2019. Though neither had been called up to the national squad since January 2021, the exclusion of both from the 2020 Olympics squad was considered surprising, and Harris wrote that she was disappointed.
Mélanie Henique	France	Swimming	2016, 2020, 2024		Widely out prior to 2015, when a homophobic attack left her injured and unable to compete in the French Swimming Open.
Laurie Hernandez	United States	Gymnastics	2016	1st place, gold medalist(s) 2nd place, silver medalist(s)	Came out widely in 2022, announcing her anniversary with Charlotte Drury.
Michelle Heyman	Australia	Football	2016, 2024		Came out prior to the Games in 2016.
Svenja Huth	Germany	Football	2016	1st place, gold medalist(s)	
Aleksandra Jarmolińska	Poland	Shooting	2016, 2020		Came out widely shortly before the 2020 Games, by announcing her engagement.
Clarke Johnstone	New Zealand	Equestrian	2016, 2024		
Megan Jones	Great Britain	Rugby	2016, 2020, 2024		Jones was a reserve in 2016 and did not play. Her partner is teammate Celia Quansah. The couple have said that the inclusive nature of their sport allowed them to discover their sexuality.
Jasmine Joyce	Great Britain	Rugby	2016, 2020, 2024		In a relationship with Wales teammate Alisha Butchers.
Daria Kasatkina	Russia / ROC	Tennis	2016, 2020		Kasatkina competed for Russia in 2016 and the Russian Olympic Committee at the 2020 Games. At the 2014 Youth Olympics, she won a silver medal. After having alluded to bisexuality in 2021, prior to the 2020 Games, when asked by Sport.ru about homosexuality in women's tennis and saying she would have a relationship with a woman, but not a potential opponent, she came out widely as lesbian in 2022, criticising Russia's homophobia. She also announced her relationship with fellow Russian athlete Natalia Zabiiako.
Alev Kelter	United States	Rugby	2016, 2020, 2024	3rd place, bronze medalist(s)	Widely out prior to the 2020 Games, Kelter has spoken out against proposed bans on trans women playing rugby.
Alanna Kennedy	Australia	Football	2016, 2020, 2024		
Sam Kerr	Australia	Football	2016, 2020		Competed officially as Samantha Kerr. Widely out prior to the 2020 Games.
Isabel Kerschowski	Germany	Football	2016	1st place, gold medalist(s)	
Thembi Kgatlana	South Africa	Football	2016		
Jen Kish	Canada	Rugby	2016	3rd place, bronze medalist(s)	Widely out prior to competing. Kish married two-spirit musician Shawnee in 2021.
Valentina Kogan	Argentina	Handball	2016		Married a woman in 2013.
Ali Krieger	United States	Football	2016		Krieger and Ashlyn Harris married in December 2019. Though neither had been called up to the national squad since January 2021, the exclusion of both from the 2020 Olympics squad was considered surprising, and Harris wrote that she was disappointed.
Stephanie Labbé	Canada	Football	2016, 2020	1st place, gold medalist(s) 3rd place, bronze medalist(s)	Has been in a relationship with skier and cyclist Georgia Simmerling since 2016.
Ghislaine Landry	Canada	Rugby	2016, 2020	3rd place, bronze medalist(s)	Married a woman in 2018.
Li Ying †	China	Football	2016		Li Ying was originally an alternate for the 2016 squad, and joined the playing team when a teammate withdrew injured. She became the first active female Chinese sportsperson to come out when she did so shortly before the 2020 Games, at which point she was dropped from the squad.
Chloe Logarzo	Australia	Football	2016, 2020		Widely out prior to the 2020 Games.
Luciana	Brazil	Football	2016, 2024	2nd place, silver medalist(s)	
Arthur Mariano Nory	Brazil	Gymnastics	2016, 2020, 2024	3rd place, bronze medalist(s)	Also known as Arthur Nory.
Ian Matos	Brazil	Diving	2016		Matos came out in 2014, saying he was inspired to do so by Tom Daley coming out the year prior.
Bambanani Mbane	South Africa	Football	2016		Married her wife in 2019.
Inika McPherson	United States	Athletics	2016		Made public her relationship with Regina George in 2014.
Leilani Mitchell	Australia	Basketball	2016, 2020		Widely out prior to competing.
Meikayla Moore	New Zealand	Football	2016, 2020, 2024		
Eefje Muskens	Netherlands	Badminton	2016		
Ashley Nee	United States	Kayaking	2016		Widely out prior to competing.
Kate O'Brien	Canada	Cycling	2016		O'Brien took up bobsleigh in university, and got as far as qualifying for the 2014 Winter Olympics before an injury took her out of competition. In her time out, she was recruited to join the Canadian track cycling team as they prepared for the 2016 Olympic Games, at which she competed. At a track cycling demonstration in 2017, O'Brien was involved in a major crash and suffered traumatic injury; Team Canada incorporated her into their Paralympic track cycling team for the 2020 Games. Widely out prior to the 2020 Games.
Meghan O'Leary	United States	Rowing	2016, 2020		Widely out prior to the 2020 Games.
Carlos Peralta	Spain	Swimming	2016		
Jillion Potter	United States	Rugby	2016		
Natalie Powell	Great Britain	Judo	2016, 2020		Widely out prior to competing. In a relationship with Sanne van Dijke.
Quinn	Canada	Football	2016, 2020, 2024	1st place, gold medalist(s) 3rd place, bronze medalist(s)	Quinn came out as trans non-binary in 2020, and was one of the first out non-binary athletes to compete at the Olympic Games, and the first to win a gold medal.
Yulimar Rojas	Venezuela	Athletics	2016, 2020	1st place, gold medalist(s) 2nd place, silver medalist(s)	Was widely out by 2018. Chosen as a flagbearer in 2020.
Leicy Santos	Colombia	Football	2016, 2024		
Raven Saunders	United States	Athletics	2016, 2020, 2024	2nd place, silver medalist(s)	Widely out prior to the 2020 Games.
Tessie Savelkouls	Netherlands	Judo	2016, 2020		
Alena Sharp	Canada	Golf	2016, 2020, 2024		Widely out prior to the 2020 Games.
Erik Shoji	United States	Volleyball	2016, 2020, 2024	3rd place, bronze medalist(s)	Came out in 2025.
Georgia Simmerling	Canada	Cycling	2016, 2020	3rd place, bronze medalist(s)	Simmerling has represented Canada in three different sports; alpine skiing in 2010, freestyle skiing (specifically, ski cross) in 2014, and track cycling in 2016 and 2020. She had also intended to compete in ski cross in 2018, but a crash in the days before team selection saw her break both legs and retire from skiing. She was widely out prior to the 2020 Games, and has been in a relationship with Stephanie Labbé since 2016.
Kyah Simon	Australia	Football	2016, 2020		
Emilce Sosa	Argentina	Volleyball	2016		
Douglas Souza	Brazil	Volleyball	2016, 2020	1st place, gold medalist(s)	Widely out prior to the 2020 Games.
Breanna Stewart	United States	Basketball	2016, 2020, 2024	1st place, gold medalist(s)	Widely out prior to the 2020 Games, Stewart is married to Marta Xargay; their first child was born during the Games.
Luke Strong	Great Britain	Gymnastics	2016		Strong was an unused team member at the Games.
Kaylin Swart	South Africa	Football	2016		
Tamires	Brazil	Football	2016, 2020, 2024	2nd place, silver medalist(s)	
Irma Testa	Italy	Boxing	2016, 2020, 2024	3rd place, bronze medalist(s)	Testa came out widely after winning her Olympic medal in 2021, feeling her public image would be protected by her success.
Markus Thormeyer	Canada	Swimming	2016, 2020		Came out widely in 2019.
Sandie Toletti	France	Football	2016, 2024		Alternate in the football squad in 2016. Part of the full squad in 2024.
Susannah Townsend	Great Britain	Hockey	2016, 2020	1st place, gold medalist(s) 3rd place, bronze medalist(s)	Widely out prior to competing.
Ruby Tui	New Zealand	Rugby	2016, 2020	1st place, gold medalist(s) 2nd place, silver medalist(s)	Widely out prior to the 2020 Games. Tui became popular after giving an exuberant winners' interview to the BBC.
Marieke van der Wal	Netherlands	Handball	2016		Widely out prior to Games; team substitute/reserve.
Emily van Egmond	Australia	Football	2016, 2020, 2024		
Elke Vanhoof	Belgium	Cycling	2016, 2020		Widely out prior to the 2020 Games.
Júlia Vasconcelos	Brazil	Taekwondo	2016		Widely out prior to competing.
Kira Walkenhorst	Germany	Beach volleyball	2016	1st place, gold medalist(s)	Came out widely in 2016 after competing.
Jeffrey Wammes	Netherlands	Gymnastics	2016		Widely out prior to competing.
Sharni Smale (Williams)	Australia	Rugby	2016, 2020, 2024	1st place, gold medalist(s)	Widely out prior to the 2020 Games.
Spencer Wilton	Great Britain	Equestrian	2016	2nd place, silver medalist(s)	Widely out prior to competing.
Portia Woodman	New Zealand	Rugby	2016, 2020, 2024	1st place, gold medalist(s) 2nd place, silver medalist(s)	Widely out prior to the 2020 Games.
Marta Xargay	Spain	Basketball	2016	2nd place, silver medalist(s)	Married to Breanna Stewart; their first child was born during the 2020 Games.
Tameka Yallop	Australia	Football	2016, 2020, 2024		Became engaged to Kirsty Yallop in 2017. Competed as Tameka Butt.
Shelina Zadorsky	Canada	Football	2016, 2020, 2024	1st place, gold medalist(s) 3rd place, bronze medalist(s)	
Yenny Acuña Berrios	Chile	Football	2020		Widely out prior to competing.
Holly Aitchison	Great Britain	Rugby	2020		
Elissa Alarie	Canada	Rugby	2020		Widely out prior to competing.
Julie Allemand	Belgium	Basketball	2020, 2024		Widely out prior to competing.
Ramsey Angela	Netherlands	Athletics	2020	2nd place, silver medalist(s)	Widely out prior to competing.
Filippa Angeldahl	Sweden	Football	2020	2nd place, silver medalist(s)	
Olivia Apps	Canada	Rugby	2020, 2024	2nd place, silver medalist(s)	
Karriss Artingstall	Great Britain	Boxing	2020	3rd place, bronze medalist(s)	Announced her relationship with teammate Lauren Price after they each won medals during the 2020 Games.
Ana Azevedo	Brazil	Athletics	2020, 2024		
Leo Baker	United States	Skateboarding	2020		Nonbinary and trans, Baker was selected to the women's team but quit in the run-up to the Games in order to transition.
Jolyn Beer	Germany	Shooting	2020, 2024		Widely out prior to competing.
Alice Bellandi	Italy	Judo	2020, 2024	1st place, gold medalist(s)	Widely out prior to competing.
Perris Benegas	United States	Cycling	2020, 2024	2nd place, silver medalist(s)	Widely out prior to competing.
Hanna Bennison	Sweden	Football	2020	2nd place, silver medalist(s)	
Nathalie Björn	Sweden	Football	2020	2nd place, silver medalist(s)	
Erica Bougard	United States	Athletics	2020		Widely out by 2019.
Lucy Bronze	Great Britain	Football	2020		
Amandine Buchard	France	Judo	2020, 2024	1st place, gold medalist(s) 2nd place, silver medalist(s) 3rd place, bronze medalist(s)	Came out shortly before the 2020 Games for Pride Month in June 2021.
Saskia Budgett	Great Britain	Rowing	2020		Budgett was selected as a reserve to the team.
Jane Campbell	United States	Football	2020, 2024	1st place, gold medalist(s) 3rd place, bronze medalist(s)	
Ally Carda	United States	Softball	2020	2nd place, silver medalist(s)	Widely out prior to competing.
Adriana Cardoso	Brazil	Handball	2020, 2024		
Jade Carey	United States	Gymnastics	2020, 2024	1st place, gold medalist(s) 3rd place, bronze medalist(s)	
Marjorie Carpréaux	Belgium	Basketball	2020		Widely out prior to competing.
Rut Castillo	Mexico	Gymnastics	2020		Widely out prior to competing.
Kendall Chase	United States	Rowing	2020		Widely out prior to competing.
Amanda Chidester	United States	Softball	2020	2nd place, silver medalist(s)	Chidester and Mexican-American softball player Anissa Urtez got engaged in 2020.
Layshia Clarendon	United States	Basketball	2020		Clarendon was an alternate for the women's 3x3 basketball team, but did not travel. They identify as non-binary and use all pronouns, and has a wife.
Dominic Clarke	Australia	Gymnastics	2020		Clarke identifies as gay and queer, and is the pride ambassador for Gymnastics New South Wales.
Aoife Cooke	Ireland	Athletics	2020		Widely out prior to competing.
Fiona Crackles	Great Britain	Hockey	2020, 2024	3rd place, bronze medalist(s)	
Nina Cutro-Kelly	United States	Judo	2020		Widely out prior to competing.
Rachel Daly	Great Britain	Football	2020		Widely out prior to competing.
Ana Carolina da Silva	Brazil	Volleyball	2020, 2024	2nd place, silver medalist(s) 3rd place, bronze medalist(s)	Widely out prior to competing.
Chayenne da Silva	Brazil	Athletics	2020, 2024		
Izabela da Silva	Brazil	Athletics	2020, 2024		Widely out prior to competing.
Tierna Davidson	United States	Football	2020, 2024	1st place, gold medalist(s) 3rd place, bronze medalist(s)	Widely out prior to competing.
Anouk Dekker	Netherlands	Football	2020		Named as a reserve.
Valerie Demey	Germany	Cycling	2020		Widely out prior to competing.
Natalya Diehm	Australia	Cycling	2020, 2024	3rd place, bronze medalist(s)	
Margielyn Didal	Philippines	Skateboarding	2020		Widely out prior to competing.
Stefanie Dolson	United States	Basketball	2020	1st place, gold medalist(s)	Widely out prior to competing.
Gia Doonan	United States	Rowing	2020		Widely out prior to competing.
Anton Down-Jenkins	New Zealand	Diving	2020		Widely out prior to competing.
Charlotte Drury	United States	Gymnastics	2020		Drury was part of the gymnastics trampolining team in Tokyo, but did not perform. She had previously earned the USA a spot at the 2016 Olympics, but was injured shortly before team selection. Came out widely in 2022, when partner Laurie Hernandez posted about their anniversary.
Taylor Edwards	United States	Softball	2020	2nd place, silver medalist(s)	Named as a reserve.
Rashida Ellis	United States	Boxing	2020		Widely out prior to competing.
Christiane Endler	Chile	Football	2020		Openly lesbian and married a woman in 2021.
Emma Entzminger	Canada	Softball	2020	3rd place, bronze medalist(s)	
Jennifer Falk	Sweden	Football	2020	2nd place, silver medalist(s)	
Beatriz Ferreira	Brazil	Boxing	2020, 2024	2nd place, silver medalist(s) 3rd place, bronze medalist(s)	
Marina Fioravanti	Brazil	Rugby	2020, 2024		Widely out prior to competing.
Sisca Folkertsma	Netherlands	Football	2020		Widely out prior to competing.
Adrianna Franch	United States	Football	2020	3rd place, bronze medalist(s)	Married a woman in 2019.
Larissa Franklin	Canada	Softball	2020	3rd place, bronze medalist(s)	Widely out prior to competing.
Carol Gattaz	Brazil	Volleyball	2020	2nd place, silver medalist(s)	Widely out prior to competing.
Lauriane Genest	Canada	Cycling	2020, 2024	3rd place, bronze medalist(s)	
Geyse	Brazil	Football	2020		
Paula Ginzo	Spain	Basketball	2020, 2024		Ginzo was part of the basketball team but did not play.
Chelsea Gray	United States	Basketball	2020, 2024	1st place, gold medalist(s)	Widely out prior to competing.
Annie Guglia	Canada	Skateboarding	2020		Widely out prior to competing.
Kellie Harrington	Ireland	Boxing	2020, 2024	1st place, gold medalist(s)	Harrington, a flag bearer at the 2020 Games, was widely out prior to competing.
Nicole Heavirland	United States	Rugby	2020, 2024	3rd place, bronze medalist(s)	Came out in 2022, saying she had hoped she would have been on the 2020 Games' Outsports Team LGBTQ list without needing to have a formal coming out.
Lauren Hemp	Great Britain	Football	2020		
Raz Hershko	Israel	Judo	2020, 2024	2nd place, silver medalist(s) 3rd place, bronze medalist(s)	
Laurel Hubbard	New Zealand	Weightlifting	2020		At the 2020 Games, Hubbard, meeting all requirements for her event, became the first transgender woman to compete as a woman. At junior level, Hubbard had held the New Zealand national record for boys. Hubbard's participation was variously welcomed and criticised by people from various sporting and political spheres.
Maarten Hurkmans	Netherlands	Rowing	2020		Widely out prior to competing.
Lina Hurtig	Sweden	Football	2020	2nd place, silver medalist(s)	Married a woman in 2019.
Sophie Ingle	Great Britain	Football	2020		
Letícia Izidoro	Brazil	Football	2020		Widely out prior to competing.
Daniel Jervis	Great Britain	Swimming	2020, 2024		Came out widely in 2022.
Sarah Jones	Great Britain	Hockey	2020, 2024	3rd place, bronze medalist(s)	Widely out prior to competing.
Ebrar Karakurt	Turkey	Volleyball	2020, 2024		Shortly after the 2020 Games, Karakurt posted about her girlfriend on social media, which was picked up by a conservative Turkish tabloid and led to homophobic online abuse, though her teammates and the Turkish volleyball authority publicly supported her.
Nicolás Keenan	Argentina	Hockey	2020, 2024		
Fran Kirby	Great Britain	Football	2020		Widely out prior to competing.
Kristi Kirshe	United States	Rugby	2020, 2024	3rd place, bronze medalist(s)	
Katarina Kowplos	Australia	Shooting	2020		Widely out prior to competing.
Michelle Kroppen	Germany	Archery	2020, 2024	2nd place, silver medalist(s) 3rd place, bronze medalist(s)	
Nathalie Kubalski	Germany	Hockey	2020, 2024		Team reserve in 2020, main squad in 2024.
Emma Kullberg	Sweden	Football	2020	2nd place, silver medalist(s)	
Rayssa Leal	Brazil	Skateboarding	2020, 2024	2nd place, silver medalist(s) 3rd place, bronze medalist(s)	
Evy Leibfarth	United States	Canoeing	2020, 2024	3rd place, bronze medalist(s)	Widely out prior to competing.
Anat Lelior	Israel	Surfing	2020, 2024		
Silvana Lima	Brazil	Surfing	2020		Widely out prior to competing.
Jewell Loyd	United States	Basketball	2020, 2024	1st place, gold medalist(s)	
Sabrina Lozada-Cabbage	Puerto Rico	Basketball	2020		Widely out prior to competing.
Kaili Lukan	Canada	Rugby	2020		Widely out prior to competing.
Joey Lye	Canada	Softball	2020	3rd place, bronze medalist(s)	Widely out prior to competing.
Irish Magno	Philippines	Boxing	2020		Widely out prior to competing.
Florence Maheu	Canada	Canoeing	2020		Widely out prior to competing.
Tiffani Marinho	Brazil	Athletics	2020, 2024		
Patrícia Matieli	Brazil	Handball	2020, 2024		
Haylie McCleney	United States	Softball	2020	2nd place, silver medalist(s)	Widely out prior to competing.
Sophie McKinna	Great Britain	Athletics	2020		Came out widely in 2023.
Tayra Meléndez	Puerto Rico	Basketball	2020, 2024		
Kim Mestdagh	Belgium	Basketball	2020		Widely out prior to competing.
Kristie Mewis Δ	United States	Football	2020	3rd place, bronze medalist(s)	Widely out prior to competing. Mewis previously dated Rachel Daly, and confirmed her relationship with Sam Kerr during the 2020 Games. Later interviewed by Outsports, Mewis acknowledged that in the lead-up to the 2020 Games she had not specifically addressed her sexuality in the media, but felt she was open and authentic in her public life "without having to say it", and therefore out.
Teagan Micah Δ	Australia	Football	2020, 2024		Widely out prior to competing.
Domien Michiels Δ	Belgium	Equestrian	2020, 2024		Widely out prior to competing.
Vivianne Miedema Δ	Netherlands	Football	2020		Widely out prior to competing.
Kayla Miracle Δ	United States	Wrestling	2020, 2024		Widely out prior to competing.
Rosamaria Montibeller Δ	Brazil	Volleyball	2020, 2024	2nd place, silver medalist(s) 3rd place, bronze medalist(s)	
Gabriela Moreschi Δ	Brazil	Handball	2020, 2024		
Sofía Mulánovich Δ	Peru	Surfing	2020		Widely out prior to competing.
Grace O'Hanlon Δ	New Zealand	Hockey	2020		Widely out prior to competing.
Poppy Starr Olsen Δ	Australia	Skateboarding	2020		Widely out prior to competing, Olsen said that becoming an elite skateboarder and experiencing those communities around the world helped her discover her sexuality and come out. She wore a pride flag on her helmet at the Games.
Kaia Parnaby Δ	Australia	Softball	2020		Widely out prior to competing.
Bruna de Paula Δ	Brazil	Handball	2020, 2024		
Shaina Pellington Δ	Canada	Basketball	2020		Widely out prior to competing.
María Pérez	Spain	Athletics	2020, 2024	1st place, gold medalist(s) 2nd place, silver medalist(s)	
Nesthy Petecio Δ	Philippines	Boxing	2020, 2024	2nd place, silver medalist(s) 3rd place, bronze medalist(s)	Petecio dedicated her medal to the LGBT+ community.
Fernanda Pinilla Δ	Chile	Football	2020		Widely out prior to competing.
Nadia Podoroska Δ	Argentina	Tennis	2020, 2024		Announced her relationship with a woman in 2022.
Lauren Price †	Great Britain	Boxing	2020	1st place, gold medalist(s)	Announced her relationship with teammate Karriss Artingstall after they each won medals during the 2020 Games.
Bev Priestman Δ	Canada	Football	2020	1st place, gold medalist(s)	Priestman is the British manager of the Canada women's football team. She was widely out before competing.
Celia Quansah Δ	Great Britain	Rugby	2020		Quansah's partner is teammate Megan Jones. The couple have said that the inclusive nature of their sport allowed them to discover their sexuality.
Isalys Quiñones Δ	Puerto Rico	Basketball	2020, 2024		
Ana Patrícia Ramos Δ	Brazil	Beach volleyball	2020, 2024	1st place, gold medalist(s)	
Hayley Raso Δ	Australia	Football	2020, 2024		
Roberta Ratzke Δ	Brazil	Volleyball	2020, 2024	2nd place, silver medalist(s) 3rd place, bronze medalist(s)	
Mel Reid Δ	Great Britain	Golf	2020		Came out in a 2018 interview with Athlete Ally.
Hannah Roberts Δ	United States	Cycling	2020, 2024	2nd place, silver medalist(s)	Widely out beforehand, while at the 2020 Games Roberts said the support from her wife had given her motivation to train even through the pandemic.
Caitlin Rooskrantz Δ	South Africa	Gymnastics	2020		Widely out prior to competing.
Alexis Sablone Δ	United States	Skateboarding	2020		Widely out prior to competing.
Dayshalee Salamán Δ	Puerto Rico	Basketball	2020		Widely out prior to competing.
Senni Salminen Δ	Finland	Athletics	2020, 2024		Widely out prior to competing.
Regina Salmons Δ	United States	Rowing	2020, 2024		
Demi Schuurs Δ	Netherlands	Tennis	2020, 2024		Widely out prior to competing.
Kailen Sheridan Δ	Canada	Football	2020, 2024	1st place, gold medalist(s)	Widely out prior to competing.
Alana Smith Δ	United States	Skateboarding	2020		Smith is bisexual and non-binary, but was repeatedly misgendered by commentators during competition, which broadcasters explained was a result of the Olympics official profile listing Smith as female. Smith had used tape to write their pronouns (they/them) on their skateboard and showed this to the cameras frequently during the competition.
Sherida Spitse Δ	Netherlands	Football	2020		Widely out prior to her debut Games, Spitse suffered an injury at the start of the Games and could not compete.
Georgia Stanway †	Great Britain	Football	2020		
Guusje Steenhuis Δ	Netherlands	Judo	2020, 2024		Widely out prior to competing.
Demi Stokes Δ	Great Britain	Football	2020		Widely out prior to competing.
Erica Sullivan Δ	United States	Swimming	2020	2nd place, silver medalist(s)	Widely out prior to competing. Sullivan was said to have won over the world media in the press conference after her medal win, for her outgoing responses which included describing herself as the "epitome of the American person ... I'm multicultural. I'm queer. I'm a lot of minorities. That’s what America is." and giving public overture to the United States women's football team, particularly Tobin Heath and Christen Press. Sullivan's Japanese grandfather designed some of the buildings used at the Tokyo Games.
Carly Telford Δ	Great Britain	Football	2020		Widely out prior to competing.
Jessica Thoennes Δ	United States	Rowing	2020, 2024		Widely out prior to competing.
Kris Thomas Δ	United States	Rugby	2020, 2024	3rd place, bronze medalist(s)	Widely out prior to competing.
Marc Tur Δ	Spain	Athletics	2020		Widely out prior to competing.
Anissa Urtez Δ	Mexico	Softball	2020		Urtez and American softball player Amanda Chidester got engaged in 2020.
Daniëlle van de Donk Δ	Netherlands	Football	2020		Widely out prior to competing. In a relationship with Ellie Carpenter.
Stefanie van der Gragt Δ	Netherlands	Football	2020		Widely out prior to competing.
Shanice van de Sanden Δ	Netherlands	Football	2020		Widely out prior to competing.
Sanne van Dijke Δ	Netherlands	Judo	2020, 2024	3rd place, bronze medalist(s)	Widely out prior to competing. In a relationship with Natalie Powell.
Merel van Dongen Δ	Netherlands	Football	2020		Widely out prior to competing.
Alison Van Uytvanck Δ	Belgium	Tennis	2020		Widely out prior to competing.
Anne Veenendaal Δ	Netherlands	Hockey	2020, 2024	1st place, gold medalist(s)	Widely out prior to competing, Veenendaal was a reserve goalkeeper.
Julian Venonsky Δ	United States	Rowing	2020		Widely out prior to competing.
Nick Wagman Δ	United States	Equestrian	2020		Widely out prior to competing, Wagman was a reserve.
Keira Walsh	Great Britain	Football	2020		
Michaela Walsh Δ	Ireland	Boxing	2020, 2024		Widely out prior to competing. Her brother, Aidan Walsh, won a bronze medal at the 2020 Games.
Haleigh Washington Δ	United States	Volleyball	2020, 2024	1st place, gold medalist(s) 2nd place, silver medalist(s)	Widely out prior to competing.
Ann Wauters Δ	Belgium	Basketball	2020		Widely out prior to competing.
Leah Wilkinson Δ	Great Britain	Hockey	2020	3rd place, bronze medalist(s)	Widely out prior to competing.
Leah Williamson Δ	Great Britain	Football	2020		
Lynn Wilms	Netherlands	Football	2020		
Hayley Wilson Δ	Australia	Skateboarding	2020		Widely out prior to competing.
Chelsea Wolfe Δ	United States	Cycling	2020		Wolfe, an openly trans woman, was named to the women's team as a reserve.
Jack Woolley Δ	Ireland	Taekwondo	2020, 2024		Widely out prior to competing.
Emma Wright Δ	Canada	Water polo	2020, 2024		
Katarzyna Zillmann Δ	Poland	Rowing	2020	2nd place, silver medalist(s)	Widely out prior to competing. In 2019, she took part in the "Sport Against Homophobia" social campaign in her home country, where she has also been named Ambassador of LGBT people, at the 2021 LGBT+ Diamond Awards ceremony.

== Sources ==
=== Databases ===
International Olympic Committee

- IOC (2022l). "Hedvig LINDAHL". Olympics.com.
- IOC (2022m). "Rikke SKOV". Olympics.com.
- IOC (2022o). "Alexandra LACRABERE". Olympics.com.
- IOC (2022s). "Jolanta Ogar". Olympics.com.
- IOC (2022u). "Magdalena Eriksson". Olympics.com.
- IOC (2022v). "Victor Gutierrez Santiago". Olympics.com.
- IOC (2022w). "Daria Kasatkina". Olympics.com.
- IOC (2022x). "Samantha Kerr". Olympics.com.
- IOC (2022y). "Layshia Clarendon". Olympics.com.

British Olympic Association

- BOA (2022). "Sophie Ingle". Team GB.

Other databases

- NBC (2022a). "Hedvig Lindahl Olympic Profile".
- NBC (2022b). "Sherida Spitse".

=== Literature ===
- Howard, Johnette (2005). The Rivals: Chris Evert vs. Martina Navratilova Their Epic Duels and Extraordinary Friendship. Crown Archetype. p. 181. ISBN 978-0767918848.

=== Print media ===
- Allen, Scott (22 July 2021). "Sue Bird, going for record fifth gold medal, will carry U.S. flag at Opening Ceremonies". The Washington Post. ISSN 0190-8286.
- Bugge, Mette (7 August 2010). "Slutt mellom Gro Hammerseng og Katja Nyberg" [End between Gro Hammerseng and Katja Nyberg]. Aftenposten (in Norwegian). Archived from the original on 2010-08-26.
- Connolly, Shannon (26 August 2008). "A League of Her Own". The Advocate.
- Creagh, Andrew, ed. (2006). "Perfect 10 - Matt Helm". DNA. No. 83. Archived from the original on 11 December 2008.
- Dart, James; Bandini, Nicky (12 August 2008). "Football - Knowledge: who has scored the most hat-tricks in a single season?". The Guardian. Archived from the original on 12 August 2008.
- Halloran, Jessica (24 May 2008). "Out, proud and ready to go for gold". The Sydney Morning Herald.
- Idskov, Thomas (12 October 2011). "Kendt håndboldpar skilles" [Famous handball couple part ways]. B.T. (in Danish).
- Pearce, Linda (7 January 2006). "Rennae out of closet, in your face". The Sydney Morning Herald.
- Stilson, Tina (19 August 2008). "Hammerseng drømmer om barn" [Hammerseng dreams of children]. Nettavisen (in Norwegian). Archived from the original on 2 November 2008.
- Strømsheim, Gro; Kvamme, Sigve (23 October 2005). "Ja, vi er kjærester" [Yes, we are lovers]. Dagbladet (in Norwegian).
- Sport Staff (11 November 2018). "Egonu, il bacio alla fidanzata Skorupa sulla Gazzetta dello Sport" [Egonu, the kiss to girlfriend Skorupa in the Gazzetta dello Sport]. Corriere della Sera (in Italian).
- Thomas, Katie (12 April 2010). "Equestrian Charged With H.I.V.-Related Offense". The New York Times (New York ed.). p. A12. ISSN 0362-4331.

=== Web media ===
- Appels, Astrid, ed. (10 January 2010). "Edward Gal and Hans Peter Minderhoud, One Track Minds". Eurodressage.
- Avery, Dan (8 August 2021b). "'Team LGBTQ' Earns 32 Medals at Tokyo Olympics". NBC.
- Bicks, Emily (20 June 2019). "Sweden Captain Caroline Seger & Malin Levenstad Broke Up". Heavy.
- Bosworth, Tom (13 October 2015). "So thankful for the support and wonderful messages from today! Family and Friends have made this possible! Lucky! Soon there will be no story, just happiness! #ThankYou. @attitudemag @bbcsport @gaytimesmag". Instagram. Archived from the original on 24 December 2021.
- Bronzini, Giorgia (29 September 2019). "Sempre e per sempre dalla tua parte mi troverai ❤️👰🎂 #wedding #SilviaJuri". Instagram. Archived from the original on April 30, 2023.
- Esselink, Jean Ann (6 August 2012a). "2012 Olympics: Who Are The LGBT Athletes? Day Twenty — Rikke Skov". TheNewCivilRightsMovement. Archived from the original on 21 February 2014.
- Esselink, Jean Ann (7 August 2012b). "2012 Olympics: Who Are The LGBT Athletes? Day Twenty-One — Jessica Harrison and Carole Peon". The New Civil Rights Movement. Archived from the original on 13 November 2012.
- Frazier, Kevin (21 July 2022). Christen Press Reacts to Being a Power Couple With Tobin Heath (Exclusive). Entertainment Tonight.
- Grotander, Hanna (16 May 2011). "Sexuell läggning ointressant inom idrott" [Sexual orientation uninteresting in sports] (in Swedish). Second Opinion. Archived from the original on 2011-07-18.
- Hare, Hans-Henrik Hybholt (10 October 2017). "Derfor tav danske badminton-kærester: Risikerer dødstrusler" [That's why Danish badminton fans are silent: Risking death threats]. Ekstra Bladet (in Danish).
- Hogan, Heather (21 July 2022). "Christen Press and Tobin Heath Hold Pinkies, Full-On Canoodle at the ESPYS". Autostraddle.
- Hurtig, Lina (16 August 2019). "2019•08•04 🌹💍 I love you ♾". Instagram. Archived from the original on 2021-12-24.
- Ingle, Sophie (4 June 2022). "01.06.22 💍❤️ We had the most perfect day imaginable and were lucky enough to share it with our amazing family and friends. I got to marry the most beautiful person and I can't wait for the next chapter of our lives together! Our day was simply stress free thanks to all of the businesses we used in the build up to the wedding and the actual wedding day. We can't thank you all enough 🤍". Instagram.
- IOC (2021). "Chile vs Canada - Group E Results". Tokyo 2020 Olympics. Archived from the original on August 10, 2021.
- Kiser, Drew (1 August 2016). "37 Out Women Athletes of the Rio Olympics Who Make Us Proud". Pride Magazine.
- Landry, Ghislaine (1 June 2021). "In 1999, I was 11, the Canadian Supreme Court voted in favour of preserving the definition of "marriage" as the union of a man and a woman. In 2005, I was 17, same-sex couples were given the legal right to marry in Canada. In 2006, I was 18, I came out. In 2018, I was 30, I married my love. Happy Pride!! 🌈". Instagram.
- Leyva, Danell (11 October 2020). "A thread for #NationalComingOutDay For a long time I've known that I wasn't straight. But because of certain very personal reasons, I always rejected that side of me. Earlier this year I finally understood that I'm bi/pan (still trying to figure that one out) but..." Twitter.
- Litwin, Doug, ed. (2014). "Leigh-Ann Naidoo profile". Federation of Gay Games. Archived from the original on 18 May 2014.
- Lo, Malinda (8 August 2008). "Best. Lesbian. Week. Ever". AfterEllen. Archived from the original on 10 August 2008.
- Löwing, Joakim (24 July 2012). "Hedvig drömmer om OS-guld" [Hedvig dreams of Olympic gold] (in Swedish). Hemmets Journal. Archived from the original on 26 January 2016.
- Macedo, Izabella (10 July 2020). "Andressa Alves, atacante da Seleção Brasileira, se casa com a medalhista olímpica Fran!" [Andressa Alves, Brazilian National Team striker, marries Olympic medalist Fran!]. SportBuzz (in Brazilian Portuguese). Archived from the original on 7 January 2023.
- Metcalfe, Jeff (14 May 2017). "Phoenix Mercury star Diana Taurasi marries former Mercury player Penny Taylor". The Arizona Republic. Archived from the original on 13 June 2017.
- Osworth, A. E. (2012-08-03). "More Gay Olympians: Even More Queer to Cheer For!". Autostraddle.
- Outsports (2021-07-12). "At least 185 out LGBTQ athletes at Tokyo Olympics, a record by far".
- Outsports (17 August 2021b). "At Least 36 Out LGBTQ Paralymicians are Competing in Tokyo, by far a record".
- Parker, Ashley (2017-02-17). "Florida Drops Darren Chiacchia Felony Case". Horse Authority.
- Reimer, Alex (16 August 2022a). "Candace Parker explains how her daughter propelled her to publicly come out". Outsports.
- Ritter, Oliver (12 June 2013). "Coming-Out des österreichischen Schwimmers und EM-Medaillengewinner Dominik Koll" [Coming out, the Austrian swimmer and European Championships medalist Dominik Koll] (in German). Archived from the original on 6 January 2014.
- Silva, Ana Carolina (17 August 2019). "Toni Pressley, namorada de Marta, treina após cirurgia de câncer de mama" [Toni Pressley, Marta's girlfriend, trains after breast cancer surgery]. UOL.com.br (in Portuguese).
- Staff (14 September 2012). "Skræmmende Viborg-forsvar neutraliserede SK Århus" [Scary Viborg defense neutralized SK Århus]. B.T. (in Danish). Archived from the original on 5 July 2022.
- Stump, Scott (8 July 2021). "Sue Bird Explains how Fiancee Megan Rapinoe Helped Her Publicly Come Out". Today.
- Thorén, Petra (22 September 2015). "Seger: "Det får ni fråga Zlatan om"" [Seger: "You can ask Zlatan about that"] (in Swedish). Aftonbladet.
- Tignor, Steve (29 April 2013). "Martina's Moment". Tennis.
- Todisco, Eric (4 January 2021). "Orlando Pride's Toni Pressley and Marta Are Engaged: 'Another Chapter of the Story'". People.
- Voepel, M.A. (20 July 2017). "WNBA All-Star Sue Bird is ready to let you in". espnW.
- WFCLA (2022). "General Manager: Angela Hucles Mangano". Angel City FC.
- Webb, Karleigh (18 August 2020). "Brazilian soccer scoring ace Cristiane weds her girlfriend". Outsports.
- Whitehead, Mathew (27 December 2017). "Matildas Star Tameka Butt Announces Engagement To Klepp Teammate Kirsty Yallop". SBS.
- Williams, Jon (5 August 2016). "Meet the record number of out LGBT Olympians competing in the 2016 Rio games". PinkNews.
- Williams, Ken (2 August 2012). "LGBT Watch at the Olympics: First Medal is Won by an LGBT Athlete". LGBTQ Nation.
- Williams, Ollie (21 May 2014). "England's Kate Richardson-Walsh on marrying her team-mate". BBC Sport.
- Yu, Yi-Jin (22 July 2021). "22 LGBTQ Athletes to Cheer at the Tokyo Olympics". Today.
- Zeigler, Cyd (19 August 2016a). "Over a dozen LGBTI athletes barely miss Rio medal". Outsports.
- Zeigler, Cyd (10 August 2016c). "Lone out cyclist in Rio gets top-10 finish". Outsports.
- Zeigler, Cyd (15 November 2017a). "Layshia Clarendon married her wife last weekend at their alma mater". Outsports.
- Zeigler, Cyd (24 April 2017b). "World champion and Olympian Shawn Barber comes out as 'gay and proud'". Outsports.
- Zeigler, Cyd (3 October 2019). "Out athlete Erica Bougard's rainbow shoes splash down in Qatar". Outsports.
- Zeigler, Cyd (15 December 2020d). "These 2 athletes will play against each other at the Olympics. They just got engaged". Outsports.
- Zeigler, Cyd (22 July 2021a). "These are the 6 out LGBTQ flag bearer in the Tokyo Olympics Opening Ceremony". Outsports.
- Zeigler, Cyd (24 June 2021b). "Emma Twigg will Compete in Her 4th Olympic Games, but her 1st as an out Athlete". Outsports.
- Zeigler, Cyd (6 August 2021e). "Gabriela Debues-Stafford's hair embraced the LGBTQ community despite Olympic rules". Outsports.
- Zeigler, Cyd (31 July 2021g). "New Zealand, with many out players, wins COVID-delayed rugby gold". Outsports.
- Zeigler, Cyd (6 August 2021h). "Olympic Marathoner Aoife Cooke is Out and Representing Ireland in Tokyo". Outsports.
- Zeigler, Cyd (14 June 2021i). "Kayla Miracle is the first out LGBTQ Olympic Wrestler, and she's headed to Tokyo". Outsports.
- Zeigler, Cyd (22 September 2022e). "Olympic swimmer Soren Dahl is out as gay on social media". Outsports.
- Zeigler, Cyd (21 March 2022f). "Olympian Nicole Heavirland comes out, hoped to be outed". Outsports.
- Zeigler, Cyd (29 June 2022g). "Olympic swimmer Dan Jervis comes out ahead of Commonwealth Games". Outsports.
- Zeigler, Cyd (14 June 2022h). "Kristie Mewis: 'out' at the Olympics, and photos with Sam Kerr". Outsports.
- Zuckerman, Rich (27 May 2012). "Pia Sundhage names 18 women to U.S. women's 2012 Olympic soccer roster". NBC. Archived from the original on 29 May 2012.
- Zeigler, Cyd (26 July 2012). "Over 100 out LGBT Athletes Have Competed in the Summer Olympics". Outsports.
