= List of LGBTQ Summer Olympians (1896–2000) =

There are 136 (Note: Based on the information collected on this page) modern Summer Olympic athletes, who made their Olympic debut up to and including 2000, who have identified or been identified as lesbian, gay, bisexual, transgender, pansexual, non-binary, queer, or who have openly been in a same-sex relationship, including one who has also competed at the Winter Olympic Games. The first Olympic Games in which an athlete now known to be LGBT+ competed was the 1900 Summer Olympics, also the first LGBT+ Olympic medalist and first contemporaneously out Olympian.

The most decorated able-bodied LGBT+ Summer Olympian is Australian swimmer Ian Thorpe, with 9 medals including 5 golds. At least 79 LGBT+ Summer Olympians who debuted up to and including 2000 are medalists (58.09%), of which 38 have at least one gold medal (27.94%). (Note: This includes medals won after 2000.)

== Overview ==
All based on the List of LGBT Summer Olympians (1896–2000)

By country
Country	Number of Olympians		
Country	F	M	Total
Australia	7	6	13
Austria	1	—	1
Brazil	3	—	3
Canada	5	7	12
Czech Republic (Note: Including Czechoslovakia)	1	—	1
Denmark	5	2	7
Dominica	1	—	1
Finland	1	—	1
France	2	3	5
Germany (Note: Including Weimar Republic, West Germany and East Germany)	14	3	17
Great Britain	4	5	9
Greece	1	1	2
Ireland	—	1	1
Netherlands	3	3	6
New Zealand	—	2	2
Norway	8 (Note: Hege Riise represented Norway up to 2000, and Great Britain in 2020. She is only counted for Norway in this table.)	—	8
Puerto Rico	—	1	1
Spain	2	2	4
Sweden	6	2	8
United States	22	12	34

By year
Games	Number of Olympians (Note: Including multi-year appearances of the same Olympian.)		
Games	F	M	Total
1900 Summer	—	1	1
1904 Summer	—	1	1
1908 Summer	—	1	1
1912 Summer	—	3	3
1924 Summer	—	4	4
1928 Summer	5	4	9
1932 Summer	6	5	11
1936 Summer	4	4	8
1948 Summer	—	5	5
1952 Summer	1	—	1
1956 Summer	2	—	2
1960 Summer	—	1	1
1964 Summer	2	—	2
1968 Summer	2	3	5
1972 Summer	1	2	3
1976 Summer	5	3	8
1980 Summer	1	1	2
1984 Summer	8	4	12
1988 Summer	8	9	17
1992 Summer	14	10	24
1996 Summer	44	14	58
2000 Summer	44	24	68

By sport
Sport	Number of Olympians by gender (Note: Including multi-disciplinary Olympians)				
Sport	Female		Male		Total
Sport	Cisgender	Transgender	Cisgender	Transgender	Total
Athletics	9	1 (Note: Competed in a men's category)	7	1 (Note: Competed in a women's category)	18
Basketball	6	—	—	—	6
Beach volleyball	2	—	—	—	2
Boxing	—	—	2	—	2
Canoeing and Kayaking	—	1	—	—	1
Cycling	5	—	1	—	6
Diving	—	—	7	—	7
Equestrian	—	—	12	—	12
Fencing	1	—	1	—	2
Football	24	—	2	—	26
Gymnastics	1	—	4	—	5
Handball	4	—	—	—	4
Hockey	7	—	—	—	7
Judo	4	—	—	—	4
Rowing	6	—	1	—	7
Swimming	5	—	10	—	15
Tennis	7	—	1	—	8
Triathlon	—	—	1	—	1
Volleyball	4	—	—	—	4

== Summer Olympic athletes and coaches (1900–2000) ==
Tables are default sorted by first Games appearance chronologically, then current surname or common nickname alphabetically, then first name alphabetically. They can be sorted by current surname (where used) or common nickname alphabetically; by country and sport alphabetically; by Games chronologically; (Note: Where athletes have represented multiple countries, competed in multiple sports, and/or at multiple Games, the country/sport/Games they are sorted by is their first country/sport/Games chronologically.) and by medals as organised in Olympics medals tables. (Note: Based on most golds over total medals, then alphabetically by current surname or common nickname. In cases of medals for demonstration events and honourable mentions in artistic events, these are sorted between one bronze and no medals.)

Athlete	Country	Sport	Games	Medal(s)	Notes
Robert de Montesquiou	France	Equestrian	1900	3rd place, bronze medalist(s)	Montesquiou was a "notorious homosexual", with this influence discussed, though he may have lived a chaste life. He won a bronze medal in the Hacks and hunter combined equestrian event in 1900; prior to 1996, the event was not consistently considered to have been truly Olympic, but is since included. Around the time of his Games appearance in 1900, Montesquiou was noted to feel stifled by the aristocracy he had been born into, which was "fundamentally conservative".
George Poage	United States	Athletics	1904	3rd place, bronze medalist(s)	The first African-American Olympic medalist, Poage was also gay. Black activists wanted a boycott of the 1904 Games in which Poage competed, as crowds would be segregated in St. Louis, but Poage felt it important that he compete. After his success, he moved to the city to teach; though rumors of him being gay were prevalent, and may be the reason he was fired from his teaching job, it was only confirmed by family after his death.
Niels Bukh	Denmark	Gymnastics	1908, 1912		Bukh was selected to the 1908 Olympic team, but did not compete, and then was coach of the gold-medal winning 1912 gymnastics team. He was out, though not widely; he was outed internationally by a former partner after expressing support for the Nazis. In part, his support came from Adolf Hitler being a personal fan and inviting Bukh to be part of his propaganda (displaying the ideal male aesthetic) for the 1936 Games in Berlin. His biographers suggest that, despite his support for the party; the German occupation of Denmark; and the outing, Bukh never knew of the Nazi stance on homosexuality.
Leif Rovsing	Denmark	Tennis	1912		Rovsing was openly gay within his sport and this was accepted; the Danish Football Association, which administed tennis at the time, however, felt his sexuality was at conflict with the working-class ideals of their sport, and in 1917 used evidence of other men visiting Rovsing's home to ban him from competing. The ban was rescinded but reinstated in the 1920s, saying that his "opinions and conduct" were the reason for the ban, which then extended to being excluded from some locker and shower rooms.
Fritzi Löwy	Austria	Swimming	1928		Described as "reportedly bisexual" during her career, Löwy remained unmarried.
Otto Peltzer	Germany (Weimar Republic)	Athletics	1928, 1932		Peltzer was openly gay, though this was not widely known. In the 1930s, he was arrested by the Nazis for his homosexuality. Sentenced to 18 months in prison, he was released early on the condition that he renounce his involvement in sports. He did but, ultimately, was imprisoned in Mauthausen concentration camp until its liberation in 1945.
Babe Didrikson Zaharias	United States	Athletics	1932	1st place, gold medalist(s) 2nd place, silver medalist(s)	Won two gold medals and one silver medal in one Olympic Games. Though she did not identify her sexuality, Didrikson Zaharias was described as a lesbian. As her marriage deteriorated in the 1950s, she became intimate with Betty Dodd, who moved into Didrikson's home towards the end of her life.
Helen Stephens	United States	Athletics	1936	1st place, gold medalist(s)	Stephens had a long-time female partner. At the 1936 Games, she and rival Stella Walsh were accused of being men. Rudimentary sex verification checks were carried out; Stephens reported that Hitler himself "[took] hold of [her] fanny" to affirm she was a woman, which she was (an autopsy would show that Walsh was intersex).
Marjorie Larney	United States	Athletics	1952, 1956		
Susan McGreivy	United States	Swimming	1956		Following her Olympics competition, McGreivy became a lesbian activist. She also helped to defend the Gay Games in front of the United States Olympic & Paralympic Committee.
Norman Elder	Canada	Equestrian	1960, 1968		Elder was known to be gay within his community for many years but was widely outed in the 1990s after being charged with indecent assault allegations relating to instances of gay sex in the 1970s. After serving a prison sentence, he fell into poverty and subsequently killed himself in 2003.
Marion Lay	Canada	Swimming	1964, 1968	3rd place, bronze medalist(s)	Lay competed in two Olympic Games, winning a bronze medal in 1968. After competing, Lay came out as a lesbian, and has contributed to supporting LGBT issues in sport, including organizing Pride Houses.
Karin Büttner-Janz	East Germany	Gymnastics	1968, 1972	1st place, gold medalist(s) 2nd place, silver medalist(s) 3rd place, bronze medalist(s)	
Mason Phelps Jr.	United States	Equestrian	1968		Selected as an alternate.
Tom Waddell	United States	Athletics	1968		Several years after competing at the Olympic Games, Waddell founded the "Gay Olympics", renamed the Gay Games. He died of AIDS shortly after this.
Mark Chatfield	United States	Swimming	1972		Chatfield came out after retiring from sport, saying he remained closeted for fear of being removed from the team, and then unretired to compete in the Gay Games in 1994.
Peter Prijdekker	Netherlands	Swimming	1972		As well as the Olympics, Prijdekker competed at the Gay Games for Great Britain, having previously been banned from his swim team after his partner died of AIDS.
Betty Baxter	Canada	Volleyball	1976		After competing, Baxter became a volleyball coach, but was fired when newspapers outed her as a lesbian. She then helped to organize the Gay Games.
Scott Cranham	Canada	Diving	1976		Cranham came out after his Olympic career, and went on to compete at Gay Games.
Caitlyn Jenner	United States	Athletics	1976	1st place, gold medalist(s)	Jenner won the men's decathlon in 1976 before becoming a reality star; when she came out in 2015, she became one of the highest profile transgender individuals. She advocates to prevent trans women from taking part in sports at all levels.
Sandra Kirby	Canada	Rowing	1976		After competing at the Olympics, Kirby started campaigning against female athletes all having to have chromosomal testing in order to compete. She then became a researcher of gender and homophobia in sports, and came out after becoming a professor.
Nancy Lieberman	United States	Basketball	1976	2nd place, silver medalist(s)	Previously dated Martina Navratilova, but stayed closeted even as Navratilova came out.
Greg Louganis	United States	Diving	1976, 1984, 1988	1st place, gold medalist(s) 2nd place, silver medalist(s)	Though he had been living a fairly openly gay life, Louganis publicly came out with a pre-taped video shown at the 1994 Gay Games. A year later, he announced he was HIV-positive in his memoir, Breaking the Surface. In 1984 and 1988, Louganis won gold medals in both diving events, having won platform silver in 1976; he famously hit his head on the diving board in 1988, bleeding, shortly after being diagnosed as HIV-positive, a scenario he said left him "paralyzed with fear".
Gail Marquis	United States	Basketball	1976	2nd place, silver medalist(s)	Married a woman in 2011.
Olivier Rouyer	France	Football	1976		A member of the French football squad, Rouyer came out as gay after retiring from both playing and coaching.
Terence Etherton	Great Britain	Fencing	1980		Etherton was named to the team in 1980 but chose to boycott.
Jackie Silva	Brazil	Volleyball, Beach volleyball	1980, 1984, 1996	1st place, gold medalist(s)	Competed in volleyball in 1980 and 1984, and won gold in the inaugural beach volleyball competition in 1996.
Sabine Braun	West Germany / Germany	Athletics	1984, 1988, 1992, 1996, 2000	3rd place, bronze medalist(s)	Braun is openly lesbian and lives with Beate Peters.
Sherry Cassuto	United States	Rowing	1984, 1988		An alternate in the 1984 Olympics, Cassuto competed in 1988.
Robert Dover	United States	Equestrian	1984, 1988, 1992, 1996, 2000, 2004	3rd place, bronze medalist(s)	Known as the first widely out Summer Olympian, Dover came out before competing in his second Games in 1988. In 2004, he told reporters that there were many more gay athletes than were out at the Games, suggesting they were closeted just because they were more focused on sport.
Greg Duhaime	Canada	Athletics	1984		Duhaime was openly gay.
Gigi Fernández	United States	Tennis	1984, 1992, 1996	1st place, gold medalist(s)	Though Puerto Rican, Fernández competed for the United States at the Olympics. She came out in 1993 and has been with partner Jane Geddes since the 1990s.
Ginny Gilder	United States	Rowing	1984	2nd place, silver medalist(s)	
Bruce Hayes	United States	Swimming	1984	1st place, gold medalist(s)	Hayes became the first Olympic gold medalist to compete at the Gay Games, which he did in 1990.
Zoe MacKinnon	Canada	Hockey	1984		
Holly Metcalf	United States	Rowing	1984	1st place, gold medalist(s)	
Beate Peters	West Germany	Athletics	1984, 1988		Peters is openly lesbian and lives with Sabine Braun.
Helena Åberg	Sweden	Swimming	1988		Åberg's coach was unhappy when she publicly came out in the 1980s, but they reconciled and went on to work together in training for the Olympics.
Mark Foster	Great Britain	Swimming	1988, 1992, 1996, 2000, 2008		Came out widely in 2017.
Colin Jackson	Great Britain	Athletics	1988, 1992, 1996, 2000	2nd place, silver medalist(s)	Jackson denied he was gay in a 2004 autobiography, and again in 2008, before coming out in 2017.
Patrick Jeffrey	United States	Diving	1988, 1996		Jeffrey came out between his Olympic appearances, competing openly in 1996.
Brian Marshall	Canada	Athletics	1988		Came out in 1994.
Ana Moser	Brazil	Volleyball	1988, 1992, 1996	3rd place, bronze medalist(s)	Moser became a politician after her sports career; as of 2023 she has a wife.
Jana Novotná	Czechoslovakia / Czech Republic	Tennis	1988, 1992, 1996	2nd place, silver medalist(s) 3rd place, bronze medalist(s)	Lived with partner Iwona Kuczyńska from 2010 until Novotná's death in 2017.
Inger Pors Olsen	Denmark	Rowing	1988, 1996		
Craig Rogerson	Australia	Diving	1988, 1992, 1996		Rogerson was out when he first competed in 1988.
Petra Rossner	East Germany / Germany	Cycling	1988, 1992, 2000	1st place, gold medalist(s)	She began living with then-partner Judith Arndt in 1996.
Mark Tewksbury	Canada	Swimming	1988, 1992	1st place, gold medalist(s) 2nd place, silver medalist(s) 3rd place, bronze medalist(s)	A year after his last Olympics, in 1993, Tewksbury anonymously came out on a Canadian radio show discussing homophobia in sport. He publicly came out in 1998.
Dan Veatch	United States	Swimming	1988		Veatch said that, when he went to the Olympics in 1988, he both had not personally dealt with his sexuality, and felt there would have been a lot of pressure to come out as gay as a top-level athlete. He went on to compete at the 1998 Gay Games.
Alyson Annan	Australia / Netherlands / China	Hockey	1992, 1996, 2000, 2012, 2016, 2020, 2024	1st place, gold medalist(s) 2nd place, silver medalist(s)	Competed as a player for Australia from 1992 to 2000, winning two golds; as coach for the Netherlands from 2012 to 2020, winning two golds and a silver; and coach for China in 2024. She was also the team manager of the Netherlands squad in 2004, when they won a silver medal. At the 2000 Olympics she met her future wife, Dutch player Carole Thate.
Miriam Blasco	Spain	Judo	1992	1st place, gold medalist(s)	Married Nicola Fairbrother, her opponent in her Olympic gold medal match, in 2016.
Irene de Kok	Netherlands	Judo	1992	3rd place, bronze medalist(s)	
Lin Dunn	United States	Basketball	1992	3rd place, bronze medalist(s)	As coach.
Nicola Fairbrother	Great Britain	Judo	1992, 1996	2nd place, silver medalist(s)	Married Miriam Blasco, her opponent in her Olympic gold medal match, in 2016.
Sandra Forgues	France	Canoeing	1992, 1996, 2000	1st place, gold medalist(s) 3rd place, bronze medalist(s)	Forgues competed as a man, and came out publicly as a transgender woman in 2018.
Lawrence Keith Frostad	United States	Swimming	1992		Came out in 2022, saying he had experienced homophobia as part of the national team.
Carl Hester	Great Britain	Equestrian	1992, 2000, 2004, 2012, 2016, 2020, 2024	1st place, gold medalist(s) 2nd place, silver medalist(s) 3rd place, bronze medalist(s)	Hester has competed at seven Summer Olympics, and has been publicly out as gay since before his fourth Olympics, at home in the UK.
Mark Leduc	Canada	Boxing	1992	2nd place, silver medalist(s)	Leduc spoke anonymously about being gay and an Olympian on a Canadian radio show in 1993, before coming out publicly in 1994.
Conchita Martínez	Spain	Tennis	1992, 1996, 2000, 2004	2nd place, silver medalist(s) 3rd place, bronze medalist(s)	Was in a relationship with Gigi Fernández in the 1990s.
Marnie McBean	Canada	Rowing	1992, 1996	1st place, gold medalist(s) 3rd place, bronze medalist(s)	McBean began coming out within her personal life after competing.
Enrique Sarasola Jr.	Spain	Equestrian	1992, 1996, 2000		
Blyth Tait	New Zealand	Equestrian	1992, 1996, 2000, 2004, 2008	1st place, gold medalist(s) 2nd place, silver medalist(s) 3rd place, bronze medalist(s)	Competed at four Summer Olympics as an athlete, and as eventing manager in 2008; he was publicly out before the 2004 Games.
Carole Thate	Netherlands	Hockey	1992, 1996, 2000	3rd place, bronze medalist(s)	Out by the 2000 Olympics, where she met her future wife, Australian opponent Alyson Annan.
Anja Andersen	Denmark	Handball	1996	1st place, gold medalist(s)	Had a relationship with teammate Camilla Andersen at the time of the 1996 Games.
Camilla Andersen	Denmark	Handball	1996, 2000	1st place, gold medalist(s)	Entered a civil partnership with Norwegian opponent Mia Hundvin shortly before the 2000 Games; they were the first spouses to directly compete against each other at the Olympics.
Judith Arndt	Germany	Cycling	1996, 2000, 2004, 2008, 2012	2nd place, silver medalist(s) 3rd place, bronze medalist(s)	She began living with then-partner Petra Rossner in 1996.
Jennifer Azzi	United States	Basketball	1996	1st place, gold medalist(s)	Came out widely in 2016 when introducing fellow gay basketball executive Rick Welts at an event.
Kajsa Bergqvist	Sweden	Athletics	1996, 2000	3rd place, bronze medalist(s)	Came out as bisexual in 2011.
Kris Burley	Canada	Gymnastics	1996		Burley is a spokesman for the Canadian Olympic Committee's program to combat homophobia in sport.
Agnete Carlsen	Norway	Football	1996	3rd place, bronze medalist(s)	Entered a registered partnership with teammate Heidi Støre in 1999.
Natalie Cook	Australia	Beach volleyball	1996, 2000, 2004, 2008, 2012	1st place, gold medalist(s) 3rd place, bronze medalist(s)	Married a woman in 2008.
Amanda Cromwell	United States	Football	1996	1st place, gold medalist(s)	Married a woman in 2022. Won the event as part of the team, but did not play.
Michelle Ferris	Australia	Cycling	1996, 2000	2nd place, silver medalist(s)	Was widely out before 2011, when The Age wrote that she had been the first out Australian elite sportswoman; at the time, she explained that if she had ever been asked about her sexuality when competing she would have been out, and did not bring it up herself as she felt it was unrelated to her sport. She also said that her sexuality was known at the time she was competing, she just did not talk about it publicly.
Formiga	Brazil	Football	1996, 2000, 2004, 2008, 2012, 2016, 2020	2nd place, silver medalist(s)	Widely out by the 2020 Games.
Louise Hansen	Denmark	Football	1996		Widely out by 2008, when she was in a relationship with Renate Lingor. Was part of the squad but did not play.
Tone Haugen	Norway	Football	1996	3rd place, bronze medalist(s)	Also competed in the 2002 Gay Games.
Tiia Hautala	Finland	Athletics	1996, 2000, 2004		Came out in 2013.
Billie Jean King	United States	Tennis	1996, 2000		King was outed by an ex-partner in a lawsuit in 1981, ultimately forcing her retirement in 1983; she did not get a chance to play at the Olympics but did coach the United States women's tennis team to two gold medals, and in 2003 was awarded the International Olympic Committee Women and Sport World Trophy. In 2013, Barack Obama named her to the US delegation for the 2014 Winter Olympics, held in Sochi, as a statement against Russia's homophobic laws.
Daniel Kowalski	Australia	Swimming	1996, 2000	1st place, gold medalist(s) 2nd place, silver medalist(s) 3rd place, bronze medalist(s)	Came out in 2010.
Katja Kraus	Germany	Football	1996		Unused substitute. Married to politician Katrin Suder.
Renate Lingor	Germany	Football	1996, 2000, 2004, 2008	3rd place, bronze medalist(s)	Widely out by 2008, when she was in a relationship with Louise Hansen.
Linda Medalen	Norway	Football	1996	3rd place, bronze medalist(s)	Came out in 1999.
Ioannis Melissanidis	Greece	Gymnastics	1996, 2000	1st place, gold medalist(s)	Came out in 1996. Reportedly the first openly gay Greek modern Olympian to win a gold medal.
Sandra Minnert	Germany	Football	1996, 2000, 2004	3rd place, bronze medalist(s)	
Bente Nordby	Norway	Football	1996, 2000	1st place, gold medalist(s) 3rd place, bronze medalist(s)	Came out in 2005.
Graeme Obree	Great Britain	Cycling	1996		
David Pichler	United States	Diving	1996, 2000		Came out publicly shortly before his Olympic debut in 1996, in an interview at the US trials, when he accused the national coach of being out to get him and his boyfriend.
Hege Riise	Norway / Great Britain	Football	1996, 2000, 2020	1st place, gold medalist(s) 3rd place, bronze medalist(s)	
Danni Roche	Australia	Hockey	1996	1st place, gold medalist(s)	
Briana Scurry	United States	Football	1996, 2000, 2004	1st place, gold medalist(s) 2nd place, silver medalist(s)	Widely out by 1999.
Guenter Seidel	Germany	Equestrian	1996, 2000, 2004	3rd place, bronze medalist(s)	Was widely out before 2004.
Reidun Seth	Norway	Football	1996	3rd place, bronze medalist(s)	Also competed in the 2002 Gay Games.
Jimmy Sjödin	Sweden	Diving	1996		
Heidi Støre	Norway	Football	1996	3rd place, bronze medalist(s)	Entered a registered partnership with teammate Agnete Carlsen in 1999.
Rennae Stubbs	Australia	Tennis	1996, 2000, 2004, 2008		Came out publicly in 2006.
Pia Sundhage	Sweden / United States / Brazil	Football	1996, 2008, 2012, 2016, 2020	1st place, gold medalist(s)	Competed as a player for Sweden in 1996, the coach of the Sweden women's team in 2016, the coach of the United States women's team in 2008 and 2012, and the coach of the Brazil women's team in 2020. She came out in 2010, saying that she experienced no homophobia in the United States.
Sheryl Swoopes	United States	Basketball	1996, 2000, 2004	1st place, gold medalist(s)	Swoopes came out as gay in 2005, and lived with a female partner for six years. She has twice married men.
Lena Videkull	Sweden	Football	1996		
Lisa-Marie Vizaniari	Australia	Athletics	1996, 2000		Vizaniari was widely out prior to the 2000 Olympics.
Martina Voss-Tecklenburg	Germany	Football	1996		Had a relationship with Inka Grings that ended in 2000.
Saskia Webber	United States	Football	1996	1st place, gold medalist(s)	Webber was an alternate goalkeeper for the team. She has also played at the Gay Games.
Francilla Agar	Dominica	Swimming	2000		Agar is openly lesbian and resides in Canada, saying at the time of her Games that she sometimes avoided going back to Dominica due to the attitude of the wider community.
Marilyn Agliotti	Netherlands	Hockey	2000, 2008, 2012	1st place, gold medalist(s)	Came out publicly in 2011.
Nadine Angerer	Germany	Football	2000, 2004, 2008	3rd place, bronze medalist(s)	Angerer won her first two bronze medals as reserve goalkeeper without playing a match; she was the main goalkeeper in 2008 when she won her third bronze. She came out in 2010.
Carl Blasco	France	Triathlon	2000, 2004		Came out shortly before the 2000 Olympics.
Balian Buschbaum	Germany	Athletics	2000		Competed in women's events and came out as a transgender man in 2007, retiring early in order to undergo hormone treatment and transition. He continued to coach until 2013.
Robert Costello	United States	Equestrian	2000		
Orlando Cruz	Puerto Rico	Boxing	2000		Came out widely in 2012.
Eleni Daniilidou	Greece	Tennis	2000, 2004, 2008		
Imke Duplitzer	Germany	Fencing	2000, 2004, 2008, 2012	2nd place, silver medalist(s)	Came out before 2004 Games.
Inka Grings	Germany	Football	2000	3rd place, bronze medalist(s)	Grings is openly bisexual, and has had a relationship with Linda Bresonik.
Peter Häggström	Sweden	Athletics	2000		Came out in 2009.
Mathew Helm	Australia	Diving	2000, 2004, 2008	2nd place, silver medalist(s) 3rd place, bronze medalist(s)	Helm achieved both his medals at the 2004 Games. He was widely out when competing.
Kelly Holmes	Great Britain	Athletics	2000, 2004	1st place, gold medalist(s) 3rd place, bronze medalist(s)	Holmes came out in 2022, at the time describing her fears of being reprimanded by the military (which she had been in prior to her sporting career) if she came out earlier, as well as worrying about isolation in the sporting community as she did not know any out sportspeople when she was competing. LGBT+ campaigners noted that her interview highlighted how in 2022 there were still barriers to coming out.
Mia Hundvin	Norway	Handball	2000	3rd place, bronze medalist(s)	Entered a civil partnership with Danish opponent Camilla Andersen shortly before the 2000 Games; they were the first spouses to directly compete against each other at the Olympics. They separated three years later; Hundvin has since had relationships with men.
Juan Antonio Jiménez	Spain	Equestrian	2000, 2004, 2024	2nd place, silver medalist(s)	
Steffi Jones	Germany	Football	2000, 2004	3rd place, bronze medalist(s)	Came out in 2013.
Johan Kenkhuis	Netherlands	Swimming	2000, 2004	2nd place, silver medalist(s) 3rd place, bronze medalist(s)	Kenkhuis was widely out prior to the 2004 Games.
Lotte Kiærskou	Denmark	Handball	2000, 2004	1st place, gold medalist(s)	Began openly dating Rikke Skov when Skov joined the Viborg HK handball team in 2003; they split in 2011.
Stephen Laybutt	Australia	Football	2000		Came out after his playing career.
Amélie Mauresmo	France	Tennis	2000, 2004	2nd place, silver medalist(s)	Came out in 1999, aged 19, upon defeating the world number 1 at the Australian Open, attributing her success to accepting her sexuality.
Lauren Meece	United States	Judo	2000		Meece came out after competing. She then wrote an op-ed saying that Olympians should not be made to be gay role models, saying that she never needed a gay sporting role model (so this and other reasons athletes have come out are "cop outs" covering "ulterior motives"), and that pride and "gay politics" have no place at the Olympics, after having seen Edinanci Silva harassed about being intersex.
Paul O'Brien	New Zealand	Equestrian	2000		
Helen Richardson-Walsh	Great Britain	Hockey	2000, 2008, 2012, 2016	1st place, gold medalist(s) 3rd place, bronze medalist(s)	Helen Richardson and Kate Walsh met on the Great Britain hockey team and started dating in 2008. They married in 2013 and, in 2016, became the first same-sex married couple to win an Olympic gold medal together.
Kate Richardson-Walsh	Great Britain	Hockey	2000, 2008, 2012, 2016	1st place, gold medalist(s) 3rd place, bronze medalist(s)	Helen Richardson and Kate Walsh met on the Great Britain hockey team and started dating in 2008. They married in 2013 and, in 2016, became the first same-sex married couple to win an Olympic gold medal together.
Cheryl Salisbury	Australia	Football	2000, 2004		
Victoria Sandell Svensson	Sweden	Football	2000, 2004, 2008		Widely out prior to the 2008 Games. Her sister-in-law is teammate Cecilia Sandell.
Therese Sjögran	Sweden	Football	2000, 2004, 2008		Has been in a relationship with Malin Levenstad.
Stacy Sykora	United States	Volleyball	2000, 2004, 2008	2nd place, silver medalist(s)	Came out widely in 2012.
Arjen Teeuwissen	Netherlands	Equestrian	2000	2nd place, silver medalist(s)	Was widely out prior to competing.
Ina-Yoko Teutenberg	Germany	Cycling	2000, 2012		Came out in 2012.
Ian Thorpe	Australia	Swimming	2000, 2004	1st place, gold medalist(s) 2nd place, silver medalist(s) 3rd place, bronze medalist(s)	Thorpe came out as gay in 2014, having often denied this earlier in his career. Later that year he gave a Q&A hosted by the International Olympic Committee in which he discussed challenges he faced in swimming because of his sexuality.
Gearoid Towey	Ireland	Rowing	2000, 2004, 2008		
Ji Wallace	Australia	Gymnastics	2000	2nd place, silver medalist(s)	Came out in 2005, revealed he has HIV in 2012.
Natalie Williams	United States	Basketball	2000	1st place, gold medalist(s)	
Chris Witty	United States	Cycling	2000		Witty has competed in both Summer and Winter Olympics; she was a flagbearer at her last Games in 2006. She has only won medals in speed skating. With her gold in 2002, she also set a world record. She lives with partner and fellow former speed skater Frouke Oonk.

== Sources ==
=== Databases ===
International Olympic Committee

- IOC (2004). "Athens 2004 Hockey Official Results Book" (PDF). Olympic Reports. Archived from the original (PDF) on 13 January 2016.
- IOC (2022a). "Sherry R. CASSUTO". Olympics.com.
- IOC (2022c). "Irene DE KOK". Olympics.com.
- IOC (2022d). "Carl Hester Olympic Results". Olympics.com.
- IOC (2022e). "Carole THATE". Olympics.com.
- IOC (2022f). "Chris WITTY". Olympics.com.
- IOC (2022g). "Marilyn AGLIOTTI". Olympics.com.
- IOC (2022h). "Eleni DANIILIDOU". Olympics.com.
- IOC (2022i). "Amelie MAURESMO". Olympics.com.
- IOC (2022j). "Paul O'Brien". Olympics.com.
- IOC (2022k). "Gearoid TOWEY". Olympics.com.

Olympedia

- Olympedia (2020). "Otto Peltzer". Sports Reference. Archived from the original on 17 April 2020.
- Olympedia (2020b). "Robert Costello". Sports Reference. Archived from the original on 14 November 2012.
- Olympedia (2021). "Babe Didrikson". Sports Reference. Archived from the original on 17 April 2020.
- Olympedia (2022a). "Robert de Montesquiou-Fézensac".
- Olympedia (2022b). "Imke Duplitzer". Sports Reference. Archived from the original on 2 August 2012.
- Olympedia (2023). "Amanda Cromwell".
- Olympedia (2023b). "Louise Hansen".
- Olympedia (2023c). "Sandra Minnert".

Other databases

- AOC (2022). "Mathew Helm". Australian Olympic Committee.
- databaseOlympics (2008). "2000 Summer Olympics – Sydney, Australia – Gymnastics". Archived from the original on 2008-08-23.
- DFB (9 May 2014). "Nadine Angerer". German Football Association (in German). Archived from the original on 24 September 2015.
- World Triathlon (2022). "Carl Blasco (FRA)".

=== Literature ===
- Aldrich, Robert F.; Wotherspoon, Garry (2002). Who's who in Gay and Lesbian History: From Antiquity to World War II (Revised ed.). Psychology Press. ISBN 978-0-415-15983-8.
- Bale, John (2003). Running Cultures: Racing in Time and Space. Routledge. ISBN 0-7146-5535-X.
- Bertrand, Antoine (1996). Les curiosités esthétiques de Robert de Montesquiou [The curious aesthetics of Robert de Montesquiou] (in French). Librairie Droz. ISBN 978-2-600-00107-6.
- Bonde, Hans [in Danish] (2006). Gymnastics and Politics: Niels Bukh and Male Aesthetics. Copenhagen: Museum Tusculanum Press. ISBN 9788772898278.
- Brenner, John, ed. (2018). "Stephens, Helen (1918-1994), Papers, 1931-1995" (PDF). State Historical Society of Missouri. Archived from the original (PDF) on 12 June 2018.
- Cayleff, Susan E. (1996). Babe: The Life and Legend of Babe Didrikson Zaharias. University of Illinois Press. ISBN 978-0-252-06593-4.
- DeRocher, Jenny, ed. (2018). "La Crosse Public Library Archives :: MSS 174 :: Guide to Bruce L. Mouser Papers Related to his book 'George Coleman Poage, 1880-1962: America's First African American Olympic Medalist, a Biography'". La Crosse Public Library Archives.
- Kinney-Hanson, Sharon (2004). The Life of Helen Stephens: the Fulton Flash. Southern Illinois University Press. ISBN 0-8093-2559-4.
- Mallon, Bill (1998). The 1900 Olympic Games, Results for All Competitors in All Events, with Commentary. Jefferson, North Carolina: McFarland & Company, Inc. ISBN 978-0-7864-4064-1.
- Mouser, Bruce L (2017). George Coleman Poage, 1880–1962, America's First African American Olympic Medalist: A Biography (PDF). La Crosse, Wisconsin – via Hutchins Center for African and African American Research.
- Riordan, James; Krüger, Arnd (1999). International Politics of Sport in the Twentieth Century. Taylor & Francis. ISBN 0-419-21160-8.
- Sansom, William (1973). Proust and His World. New York: Scribner. ISBN 9780500130445.
- Stein, Marc, ed. (2004). "Didrikson, Mildred Ella". Encyclopedia of Lesbian, Gay, Bisexual and Transgendered History in America. Vol. 1. New York City: Charles Scribner's Sons.
- Symons, Caroline (2010). The Gay Games: A History. Routledge. ISBN 9781134027897.

=== Print media ===
- A Swimming Correspondent (16 August 1965). "Stimulus for Swimmers". The Times.
- Ain, Morty (23 June 2016). "'I didn't think I'd see 30,' says Greg Louganis". ESPN The Magazine. No. Body Issue 2016. ESPN.
- AFP (16 August 2004). "German cyclist Arndt livid over exclusion of lesbian lover". Australian Broadcasting Corporation. Agence France-Presse.
- Backlund, Anders (14 November 2009). "Komma ut svårare än OS-kval" [Coming out harder than Olympic qualification]. QX (in Swedish).
- Berntsen, Per Angell; Thoresen, Arne (1 July 1999). ""Jeg orker ikke leve i skjul lenger"" ["I can't bear to live in hiding anymore"] (in Norwegian). Dagbladet.
- Bonde, Hans [in Danish] (6 November 2000). "Krop og karisma" [Body and charisma]. Tidsskriftet Uddannelse (in Danish). ISSN 0503-0102. OCLC 40145796. Archived from the original on 8 August 2011.
- Bonde, Hans [in Danish] (14 December 2001). "Ikaros fra Ollerup" [Icarus from Ollerup]. Politiken (in Danish).
- Bradley, Seamus (18 April 2010). "Out and proud: Olympian Kowalski breaks silence". The Sydney Morning Herald.
- Brady, Nicole (23 October 2011). "Playing it straight". The Age.
- Bråstedt, Mats (26 July 2008). "Victoria Svensson talar ut om kärleken till frun" [Victoria Svensson speaks out about the love to the wife]. Expressen (in Swedish). Archived from the original on 27 July 2008.
- Buzinski, Jim (7 November 2000). "Glory - and a little gold - for gay Olympians". The Advocate.
- Caldwell, John (7 December 2004). "Out and silver in Holland". The Advocate – via Questia.
- Cascarino, Tony (28 April 2003). "Is it time to open the closet?". The Times. London. Archived from the original on June 23, 2025.
- Creagh, Andrew, ed. (2006). "Perfect 10 - Matt Helm". DNA. No. 83. Archived from the original on April 5, 2018.
- Crouse, Karen (12 July 2014). "Ian Thorpe, Swimming Star for Australia in Olympics, Says He Is Gay". The New York Times. Archived from the original on 13 July 2014.
- di Lorenzo, Giovanni, ed. (2 December 2010). "Angerer bekennt sich zu Männern und Frauen" [Angerer is committed to men and women]. Die Zeit (in German). Sport-Informations-Dienst. Archived from the original on 16 January 2014.
- Dirda, Michael (2013-08-28). ""Gabriele d'Annunzio" by Lucy Hughes-Hallett". The Washington Post. ISSN 0190-8286. Archived from the original on 31 August 2013.
- Fagan, David, ed. (30 November 2008). "Gold medallist Natalie Cook marries Sarah Marshall". The Courier-Mail. Archived from the original on December 2, 2008 – via news.com.au.
- Flink, Steve (15 June 2021). "The Second Act: Gigi Fernandez's fascinating post-tour career". Tennis.
- Fulton, E. Kaye (16 May 1994). "Gay and proud: Canada's only publicly gay MP tells his story". Maclean's. Archived from the original on 31 December 2022.
- Gibb, Frances (27 May 2016). "Gay former athlete promoted to highest ranks of judiciary". The Times. ISSN 0140-0460.
- Gillon, Doug (6 October 2008). "Hitler pinched my bottom". The Herald.
- Gillon, Doug (18 February 2012). "Discrimination of any kind in sport must be stamped out". The Herald. Glasgow.
- Granderson, LZ (28 October 2008). "Three-time MVP 'tired of having to hide my feelings'". ESPN The Magazine.
- Halloran, Jessica (24 May 2008). "Out, proud and ready to go for gold". The Sydney Morning Herald.
- Hannan, Liz (1 July 2007). "Divided in sport, united in love: two women and a baby boy". The Sunday Age.
- Hannan, Phillip (24 January 2001). "Canada's lesbian Olympian: Jet-lagged swimmer was just happy to be in Sydney". Xtra!.
- Harms, Carsten (20 July 1999). "Alter Siegeswille mit neuen Trainern" [Old will to win with new coaches]. Die Welt (in German).
- Heath, Ryan (25 August 2008). "A win for Australia - and for gay athletes everywhere". The Age.
- Hennie, Matt (29 August 2008). "Out Olympians add to medal tally". Southern Voice. Archived from the original on 12 October 2008.
- Herzer, Manfred [in German] (1999). "Dr. Otto Peltzer – "Ein Pädophiler überlebt den Nazi-Terror"" [Dr. Otto Peltzer – "A paedophile survives Nazi terror"]. Capri. Zeitschrift für schwule Geschichte (in German). No. 27.
- LaRocque, Marc; Shibuyama, Loni (2013). "Finding aid to the Susan McGreivy papers, 1975-1990 Coll2012.138". Online Archive of California.
- Magnay, Jacquelin (18 November 2002). "Thorpe straight as the line on the bottom of the pool". The Sydney Morning Herald. Archived from the original on 25 October 2007.
- Marks, Kathy (3 November 2002). "Sydney stays aloof as Gay Games kick off". The Independent.
- Marshall, Barbara (27 June 2011). "The scene maker: He's all about horses". The Palm Beach Post.
- McDonald, William, ed. (31 May 2016). "Sherri Honan Cassuto Obituary". The New York Times.
- McKinley, James C. Jr. (26 June 1994). "Marathon and Ceremony Bring Gay Games to Close". The New York Times.
- McRae, Donald (27 November 2017). "Mark Foster: 'I tiptoed around in the shadows for so long, but now is the time to come out'". The Guardian.
- Meece, Lauren (22 August 2008). "Olympics Are Not the Place for Gay Politics". South Florida Blade. Archived from the original on 7 December 2010 – via CherryGRRL.
- Moore, Dene (5 April 2006). "Olympian Tewksbury reveals his struggles being gay". The Globe and Mail. Toronto.
- O'Neill, Tracy (4 August 2015). "Greg Louganis: Far From Falling". Rolling Stone. Archived from the original on 14 November 2017.
- Oreskes, Michael, ed. (21 November 2007). "German pole-vaulter Yvonne Buschbaum retires, plans hormone treatment". International Herald Tribune. Associated Press.
- Pearce, Linda (7 January 2006). "Rennae out of closet, in your face". The Sydney Morning Herald.
- Pears, Tim (2008). "Otto the Strange – the Champion who defied the Nazis". The Observer Sport Monthly. No. 101.
- Pelley, Lauren (8 November 2014). "Medals, marriage and mentorship". Toronto Star – via PressReader.
- Pells, Eddie (17 December 2013). "Obama picks gay athletes for delegation to Sochi Olympics, sending signal on gay rights". Associated Press. Archived from the original on December 19, 2013.
- Peters, Jan-Eric [in German], ed. (7 March 2013a). "Transsexualität: Der Mann, der erkannte, was Frauen wirklich wollen" [Transsexuality: The man who realized what women really want]. Die Welt (in German).
- Propp, Karen (2011). "Swimmers Against the Tide" (PDF). Lilith. Archived from the original (PDF) on 28 October 2011.
- Provenzano, Jim (11 August 2004). "Heroics: Carrying a Torch for Gay Olympians". Windy City Times. Archived from the original on 18 November 2020.
- Rambion, Myrtille (19 February 2008). "Olivier Rouyer, commentateur sportif et ex-footballeur, fait son coming-out" [Olivier Rouyer, sports commentator and ex-footballer, comes out]. Têtu (in French). Archived from the original on 1 June 2009.
- Robbins, Liz (27 October 2005). "Swoopes Says She Is Gay, and Exhales". The New York Times. ISSN 0362-4331.
- Robinson, Laura (24 June 2008). "A history of women and the Olympics". Chatelaine.
- Roström-Andersson, Sofia (20 December 2011). "Kajsa Bergqvist kommer ut" [Kajsa Bergqvist comes out]. Aftonbladet (in Swedish).
- Schaap, Dick (27 July 1987). "The Death Of An Athlete". Sports Illustrated. Archived from the original on March 5, 2021.
- Smith, Gary (2 October 2000). "In Love And War: Team handball stars Camilla Andersen and Mia Hundvin are the first spouses ever to oppose each other in the Games". Sports Illustrated.
- Staff (5 March 1995). "Public Glory, Secret Agony". Newsweek.
- Valentine, Renee (16 November 2017). "Matildas legend Cheryl Salisbury: 'I'm treated equal now'". The Newcastle Herald.
- Wilstein, Steve (1995). "Homosexuality In Sports Now Impossible To Ignore". The Seattle Times.
- Woo, William F., ed. (31 October 1986). "In Memoriam (Funeral Notices)". St. Louis Post-Dispatch.
- Wire Service (31 July 1976). "Jenner's long haul pays off with gold and world mark". Eugene Register-Guard. Montreal.
- Wockner, Rex (1 September 2004). "Sports: Out Gays Win Olympic medals". Windy City Times. Archived from the original on 12 November 2006.
- Young, Ian (2011). "The Trials of Norman Elder". Canadian Notes & Queries. Archived from the original on 2014-09-18.
- Zeffer, Andy (13 August 2004). "Trotting Down a Different Path: Gays play an important role in Wellington's equestrian community". The Express Gay News. Archived from the original on 22 April 2007.

=== Web media ===
- Adhopia, Vik (9 May 2015). "Homophobia in sports still pervasive in Canada, new study shows". CBC News.
- Allan, Lance (2023-02-14). "La Crosse's George Poage was the first Black American to win Olympic medals". TMJ4 News.
- Babe Didrikson Zaharias Foundation (2006). "Record of Achievement". Babe Didrikson Zaharias Foundation, Inc. Archived from the original on 27 September 2007.
- Bendix, Trish (31 March 2009). "Jennie McNulty Presents: Walking Funny With... Saskia Webber". AfterEllen. Archived from the original on 21 February 2014.
- Bicks, Emily (20 June 2019). "Sweden Captain Caroline Seger & Malin Levenstad Broke Up". Heavy.
- Bolme, Magne; Holm, Jan (2009). "Heidi Støre". In Helle, Knut (ed.). Norsk biografisk leksikon (in Norwegian). Oslo: Kunnskapsforlaget.
- Bonde, Hans [in Danish] (26 May 2010). Lund, Jørn (ed.). "Niels Bukh". Den Store Danske Encyklopædi (in Danish).
- Booth, Robert (19 June 2022). "Kelly Holmes comes out as gay: 'I needed to do this now, for me'". The Guardian.
- Borresen, Kelsey (24 August 2017). "Former Olympian Gets Proposed To In Venice, And The Pics Are So Romantic". HuffPost.
- Brattgård, Louv (12 October 2017). "Simmaren en av de första att "komma ut" i Sverige" [Swimmer one of the first to "come out" in Sweden]. SVT Sport (in Swedish).
- Brownworth, Victoria A. (31 May 2017). "Tennis Is Filled With Lesbians!". Curve.
- Buzinski, Jim (11 August 2004). "These aren't the Gay Games". Gay.com. Archived from the original on 5 September 2005.
- Buzinski, Jim (11 July 2011). "Moment #93: David Pichler, Patrick Jeffrey compete as openly gay in Olympics". Outsports.
- Buzinski, Jim (18 July 2012). "23 openly gay and lesbian athletes at 2012 London Summer Olympics". Outsports.
- Buzinski, Jim (3 December 2014). "Gay ex-Olympic gymnast Kris Burley remembers the isolation, fear". Outsports.
- Castile, Eliza (4 August 2016). "10 LGBTQ Olympians From History". Bustle.
- Clews, Gayelene (28 May 2016). "Gay Athletes Speak Out". Wired To Play.
- Creagh, Andrew (2008). "Burnttoast #105". DNA. Archived from the original on 29 March 2012.
- D'Amboise, Angela (3 July 2007). "Lesbian Tennis Star Amelie Mauresmo Named World's Top Player". GaySports. Archived from the original on 10 June 2008.
- Daniel, Heath (14 July 2014). "Greg Louganis Tells How He Went From Heartthrob To Activist With Candid New Film". Queerty.
- Dart, James; Bandini, Nicky (12 August 2008). "Football - Knowledge: who has scored the most hat-tricks in a single season?". The Guardian. Archived from the original on 12 August 2008.
- David, Austin (April 16, 2022). "Pride follow lead of first-time pro coach Amanda Cromwell". Orlando Sentinel.
- drummerdeeds (13 January 2010). "Head coach Pia Sundhage of the U.S. Women's Soccer Team comes out". AfterEllen.
- Duggan, Megan, ed. (2022). "Athlete: Billie Jean King". Women's Sports Foundation.
- Ellin, Abby (25 November 2011). "Gail Marquis and Audrey Smaltz". New York Times.
- Escario, María (24 July 2017). "Enforque - Miriam Blasco: "Nicola y yo llevamos casadas año y medio"" [Focus - Miriam Blasco: "Nicola and I have been married for a year and a half"]. RTVE (in Spanish).
- Esselink, Jean Ann (6 August 2012a). "2012 Olympics: Who Are The LGBT Athletes? Day Twenty — Rikke Skov". TheNewCivilRightsMovement. Archived from the original on 21 February 2014.
- Garcia, Michelle (8 August 2012). "Gay Olympian Comes Out as HIV-Positive". HIVPlusMag.com. Archived from the original on 2012-08-09.
- Gianoulis, Tina (2002). "Didrikson, Mildred "Babe" (1911–1956)" (PDF). glbtq Archives.
- Gillespie, Kerry (16 August 2013). "Sochi: Canadian Olympians weigh in on Russia's anti-gay law". Toronto Star.
- Gösmann, Sven, ed. (2008-10-02). "Fotos: Das Liebesleben unserer WM-Heldinnen". RP ONLINE (in German). AP. "Seit mehreren Jahren ist Renate Lingor mit der dänischen Fußball-Nationalspielerin Louise Hansen liiert"
- Guiard, Christophe, ed. (4 March 2010). "Homosexualité et le triathlon" [Homosexuality and triathlon]. Triathlete (in French). No. 275.
- Hahn, Katharina (3 August 2022). "Hermann Tecklenburg Martina Voss-Tecklenburg: Die Liebes-Vita unserer Bundestrainerin" [Hermann Tecklenburg Martina Voss-Tecklenburg: The love life of our national coach]. Bunte.de (in German).
- Haider, Lars, ed. (30 March 2017). "Katja Kraus heiratet von der Leyens Staatssekretärin". Hamburger Abendblatt (in German).
- Hallowell, Lucy (25 October 2012). "Team USA Volleyball Player Stacy Sykora Comes Out". AfterEllen.
- Hardwick, Courtney (16 February 2018). "Important Moments In The History Of LGBT Olympians". IN Magazine. Archived from the original on 21 September 2021.
- Hellmann, Frank (26 June 2011). "Liebe im Verborgenen: Wie der DFB mit der Thema Homosexualität in der Frauen-Nationalelf umgeht" [Secret love: How the DFB deals with the issue of homosexuality in the women's national football team]. Mitteldeutsche Zeitung (in German).
- Henderson, Jon (21 November 2017). "Jana Novotná obituary". The Guardian.
- Henrichson, Jenny, ed. (2010). "90 Minuter Med...Lena Videkull" (in Swedish). It's a Women's World.se. Archived from the original on 11 August 2010.
- Hilland, Linda (2002-07-28). "Skeive fotballdamer". Stavanger Aftenblad (in Norwegian Bokmål).
- Hruby, Emma (14 January 2022). "Nancy Lieberman says Sue Bird, Megan Rapinoe are 'living the dream'". Just Women's Sports.
- Idskov, Thomas (12 October 2011). "Kendt håndboldpar skilles" [Famous handball couple part ways]. B.T. (in Danish).
- Iltalehti (2 February 2014). "Nämäkin urheilijat ovat tulleet kaapista ulos" [These athletes have come out of the closet, too] (in Finnish).
- International Olympic Committee (2016). "Paris 1900". Archived from the original on 10 October 2017.
- Iorfida, Chris (24 July 2009). "Leduc remembered as Olympic champ, gay role model". CBC Sports.
- Jørstad Wergeland, Atle; Gonsholt Ighanian, Catherine (22 January 2021). "Mia Hundvin holdt bruddet hemmelig – har fått ny kjæreste" [Mia Hundvin kept the breakup a secret - has got a new boyfriend]. Verdens Gang (in Norwegian Bokmål).
- Karlan, Sarah (25 July 2016). "Here Are Just Some Of The Badass Queer Women Competing In Rio". BuzzFeed.
- Kelner, Martha (2 September 2017). "Colin Jackson: Phenomenal athlete who came out at 50". The Guardian.
- Kitching, Heather (16 February 2010). "Olympic Pride House: Medalist says "help sport come out"". OutQ News.
- Kvamme, Sigve (20 July 2005). "Folk må følge bedre med" [People need to pay better attention]. Dagbladet (in Norwegian).
- Delait, Patrick; Leenders, Jimmy (12 February 2021). "Oud-schaatsster Oonk over haar relatie met olympisch kampioene Witty: 'Chris en ik durfden in Amerika niet hand in hand over straat te lopen'" [Former skater Oonk about her relationship with Olympic champion Witty: 'Chris and I did not dare to walk hand in hand in America']. De Limburger (in Belgian Dutch).
- Leger, Polly (31 July 2019). "This Olympian was outed in the 1980s. The 1990 Gay Games helped her reconnect to sports". CBC.
- Lo, Malinda (8 August 2008). "Best. Lesbian. Week. Ever". AfterEllen. Archived from the original on 10 August 2008.
- McCauley, Janie (2 April 2016). "San Francisco coach Jennifer Azzi comes out as gay". ESPN. Associated Press.
- Metcalf, Holly; Tewksbury, Mark (30 April 2003). "Heroes Among Us: Holly Metcalf and Mark Tewksbury". WGBH-TV Lectures. National Gay and Lesbian Athletic Conference, Stratton Student Center, MIT. Archived from the original on January 4, 2008.
- Naimark, Marc (16 September 2013). "Russian #LGBTSports Federation among those honored by Federation of Gay Games Legacy Awards; Olympic athlete and civil rights advocate Susan McGreivy and LGBT sports pioneer Jean-Nickolaus Tretter also to be honored". Archived from the original on 8 March 2016.
- Nunn, Christina (14 October 2021). "'Untold: Caitlyn Jenner': What Other TV Shows Has She Been In?". Showbiz Cheat Sheet.
- Oakley, Alan, ed. (10 June 2007). "Ji talking: on highs, lows and a super new move". The Sydney Morning Herald.
- Osworth, A. E. (2012-08-03). "More Gay Olympians: Even More Queer to Cheer For!". Autostraddle.
- Outsports (2021-07-12). "At least 185 out LGBTQ athletes at Tokyo Olympics, a record by far".
- Peters, Jan-Eric [in German], ed. (3 February 2013b). "Steffi Jones outet sich – "Ja, wir sind ein Paar"" [Steffi Jones comes out – "Yes, we are a couple"]. Die Welt (in German).
- PinkNews (5 August 2016). "Did you know the first out gay athlete nearly competed at the 1908 Olympics?".
- Rafael, Dan (4 October 2012). "Orlando Cruz 'proudly gay'". ESPN.
- Rozenberg, Joshua (2 June 2016). "Fencing International and SHUL Warden Who's Master of the Rolls". The Jewish Chronicle.
- Rupert, Maya (1 August 2011). "What Sheryl Swoopes' Engagement Means: Understanding the Role of Identity and Combo Guards". HuffPost.
- Ruszkai, Ameé (22 July 2021). "Giovana Queiroz: Barcelona's teen Olympian who opted for Brazil over the USWNT". Goal.
- Salerno, Rob (2 December 2014). "Olympians to carry message of LGBT inclusion to schools". Xtra Magazine.
- Sally (3 August 2021). "The History of LGBTQ Women in the Olympics". Autostraddle.
- Scupham-Bilton, Tony (2012a). "The History of LGBT Participation in the Olympics" (PDF). Federation of Gay Games. Archived from the original (PDF) on 2014-02-21.
- Scupham-Bilton, Tony (19 March 2012b). "March 2012 Olympic Countdown". The Queerstory Files.
- Scupham-Bilton, Tony (27 July 2016a). "First gay Olympian in History Competed in 1928". Outsports.
- Scupham-Bilton, Tony (29 February 2016b). "The Queerstory Files: Olympic Alphabet : J is for ..." The Queerstory Files.
- Staff (14 September 2012). "Skræmmende Viborg-forsvar neutraliserede SK Århus" [Scary Viborg defense neutralized SK Århus]. B.T. (in Danish). Archived from the original on 5 July 2022.
- Staff (20 August 2016). "Rio 2016 hockey: Kate and Helen Richardson-Walsh celebrate "special" win". BBC Sport.
- Swim Ontario (13 March 2017). "In Memoriam: Rafael Polinario".
- Tabberer, Jamie (16 August 2021). "Gymnast Ioannis Melissanidis on becoming Greece's 'first openly gay Olympic champion'". Attitude.
- Tullis, Matt (27 June 2013). "Who was Stella Walsh?: The story of the intersex Olympian". SB Nation. Associated Press.
- Tulloch, Ash (30 September 2020). "Exclusive Q&A: Ian Thorpe on Sydney 2000, coming out, and who to look out for at Tokyo Olympics". International Olympic Committee.
- University of Southern California (10 March 2022). "World Cup Champion Saskia Webber Named USC Women's Soccer Goalkeeping Coach". USC Trojans (Press release).
- van Lakerveld, Erik, ed. (21 December 2012). "Witty: Een Heel Nieuwe Identiteit" [Witty: A Whole New Identity]. Schaatsen (in Dutch). Archived from the original on 2014-02-28.
- Whelan, Tony (15 July 2000). "Bruce Hayes - Swimming". Gay Games. Archived from the original on 3 March 2001.
- Williams, Ken (2 August 2012). "LGBT Watch at the Olympics: First Medal is Won by an LGBT Athlete". LGBTQ Nation.
- Williams, Ollie (21 May 2014). "England's Kate Richardson-Walsh on marrying her team-mate". BBC Sport.
- Yurcaba, Jo (3 May 2021). "Caitlyn Jenner says transgender girls in women's sports is 'unfair'". NBC News.
- Zeigler, Cyd (30 August 2011). "Moment #34: Canadian volleyball coach Betty Baxter fired amidst rumors she is a lesbian". Outsports.
- Zeigler, Cyd (26 July 2012). "Over 100 out LGBT Athletes Have Competed in the Summer Olympics". Outsports.
- Zeigler, Cyd (25 November 2020a). "Gay Olympic historian: LGBTQ athletes competed in early 20th Century". Outsports.
- Zeigler, Cyd (19 February 2020b). "Robert Dover was the first out gay Olympic athlete, in 1988". Outsports.
- Zeigler, Cyd (2 May 2022b). "Gay Olympian Keith Frostad was harassed, attacked by swimmers". Outsports.
- Zeigler, Cyd (7 July 2022c). "Briana Scurry was 'The Only' Black or lesbian athlete on the 1999 USWNT". Outsports.
