= Rugby at the Summer Olympics =

- Events: 3 (men: 2; women: 1)

Summer Olympics
- 1896; 1900; 1904; 1908; 1912; 1920; 1924; 1928; 1932; 1936; 1948; 1952; 1956; 1960; 1964; 1968; 1972; 1976; 1980; 1984; 1988; 1992; 1996; 2000; 2004; 2008; 2012; 2016; 2020; 2024; 2028; 2032
- Medalists

Rugby at the Summer Olympics may refer to:

- Rugby union at the Summer Olympics (1900–1924)
- Rugby sevens at the Summer Olympics (2016–present)

== Rugby union ==
Last updated after the 1924 Summer Olympics

Rank	Nation	Gold	Silver	Bronze	Total
1	United States	2	0	0	2
2	Australasia	1	0	0	1
2	Mixed team	1	0	0	1
4	France	0	2	0	2
4	Great Britain	0	2	0	2
6	Germany	0	1	0	1
7	Romania	0	0	1	1
Totals (7 entries)		4	5	1	10

== Rugby sevens ==
Last updated after 27 July 2024

Rank	Nation	Gold	Silver	Bronze	Total
1	New Zealand	2	2	0	4
2	Fiji	2	1	1	4
3	France	1	1	0	2
4	Australia	1	0	0	1
5	Canada	0	1	1	2
6	Great Britain	0	1	0	1
7	South Africa	0	0	2	2
8	Argentina	0	0	1	1
8	United States	0	0	1	1
Totals (9 entries)		6	6	6	18

== Overall medal table ==
Last updated after the 2024 Summer Olympics

Rank	Nation	Gold	Silver	Bronze	Total
1	New Zealand	2	2	0	4
2	Fiji	2	1	1	4
3	United States	2	0	1	3
4	France	1	3	0	4
5	Australasia	1	0	0	1
5	Australia	1	0	0	1
5	Mixed team	1	0	0	1
8	Great Britain	0	3	0	3
9	Canada	0	1	1	2
10	Germany	0	1	0	1
11	South Africa	0	0	2	2
12	Argentina	0	0	1	1
12	Romania	0	0	1	1
Totals (13 entries)		10	11	7	28
