= Malin Levenstad =

Swedish football coach and former player (born 1988)

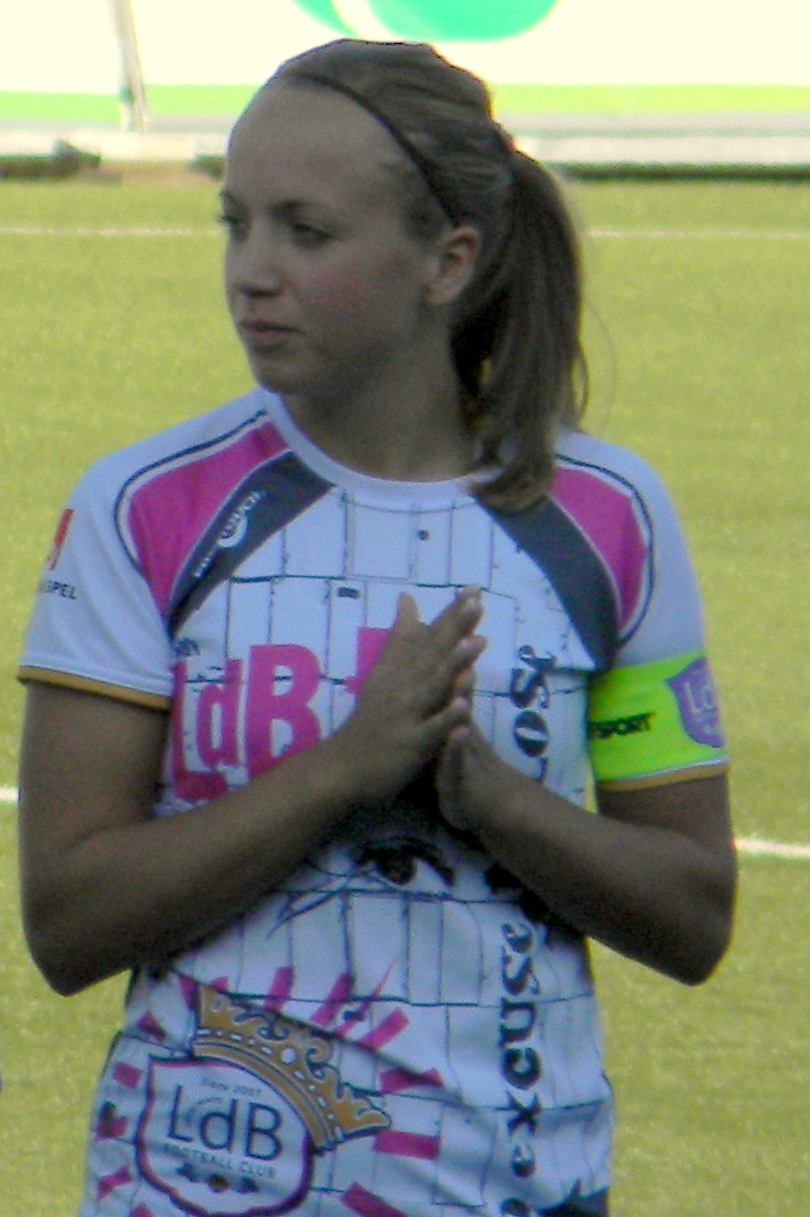

Personal information
- Full name: Eva Malin Sofia Levenstad
- Date of birth: 13 September 1988 (age 38)
- Place of birth: Vellinge, Sweden
- Height: 1.65 m (5 ft 5 in)
- Position: Defender

Youth career
- 1995–2000: Vellinge IF
- 2001–2004: Malmö

Senior career*
Years	Team	Apps	(Gls)
2005–2015	LdB FC Malmö	158	(0)
2014	→ AIK (loan)	9	(0)
2019–2020	FC Rosengård	36	(0)

International career
2008–2013	Sweden	8	(0)

Managerial career
- 2016–2020: FC Rosengård (assistant)
- 2017: FC Rosengård
- 2021–: Linköpings FC (assistant)
- * Club domestic league appearances and goals

Eva Malin Sofia Levenstad (born 13 September 1988) is a Swedish football coach and former defender. She previously played for FC Rosengård (formerly known as LdB FC Malmö) of the Damallsvenskan and spent a short period on loan at AIK in 2014. She stopped playing in 2014, but returned to Rosengård in a coaching capacity in 2016. In 2017, she was the head coach of Rosengård – the youngest head coach in Damallsvenskan. She resumed her playing career with the club in 2019. In 2021 she stopped playing again to take a position as an assistant coach at Linköpings FC.

Levenstad currently works as an agent for the global football agency CMG, representing players and coaches within women's football.

== Club career ==
In November 2013, Champions Malmö sent Levenstad on loan to AIK for the first half of the 2014 season.

Levenstad retired from playing in 2014, but was named FC Rosengård's assistant coach in November 2016. In the club's previous guise as LdB FC Malmö, Levenstad had been team captain and won three league titles. In September 2017, with the termination of FC Rosengård's head coach Jack Majgaard Jensen's contract, it was announced that Levenstad was to continue as Rosengård's head coach for the remainder of the 2017 season.

In February 2019, she came out of retirement to resume her playing career. In December 2020 she stopped playing again to take a position as an assistant coach at Linköpings FC.

== International career ==
She debuted for the Swedish national team in February 2008, a 2–0 win over Norway. Levenstad was included in the Sweden squad for the 2012 London Olympics.
