= List of LGBTQ-related films of 2015 =

This is a list of lesbian, gay, bisexual, transgender or queer-related films released in 2015. It contains theatrically released films that deal with important gay, lesbian, bisexual, transgender or queer characters or issues and may have same-sex romance or relationships as a plot device.

== Films ==
Title	Director	Country	Genre	Cast	Notes	Ref
3 Generations	Gaby Dellal	United States	Drama	Naomi Watts, Elle Fanning, Susan Sarandon, Tate Donovan, Linda Emond, Jordan Carlos, Sam Trammell, Maria Dizzia, Tessa Albertson		
4th Man Out	Andrew Nackman	United States	Comedy	Evan Todd, Parker Young, Chord Overstreet, Jon Gabrus, Jennifer Damiano, Jordan Lane Price, Kate Flannery		
Absence	Chico Teixeira	Brazil	Drama	Matheus Fagundes, Irandhir Santos, Gilda Nomacce, Thiago de Matos		
All About Them (À trois on y va)	Jérôme Bonnell	France	Romantic comedy	Anaïs Demoustier, Félix Moati, Sophie Verbeeck		
The Amina Profile	Sophie Deraspe	Canada	Documentary	Sandra Bagaria	Documentary about the Amina Abdallah Arraf al Omari hoax.	
Angry Indian Goddesses	Pan Nalin	India	Drama	Sandhya Mridul, Tannistha Chatterjee, Sarah-Jane Dias		
Arianna	Carlo Lavagna	Italy	Drama	Ondina Quadri, Massimo Popolizio		
Bare	Natalia Leite	United States	Drama	Dianna Agron, Paz de la Huerta, Chris Zylka		
Bizarre	Étienne Faure	France	Drama	Pierre Prieur, Adrian James, Raquel Nave, Charlie Himmelstein		
The Blue Hour	Anucha Boonyawatana	Thailand	Drama	Oabnithi Wiwattanawarang, Atthaphan Poonsawas, Duangjai Hirunsri, Panutchai Kittsatima, Nithiroj Simkamtom		
Blush	Michal Vinik	Israel	Drama	Sivan Noam Shimon, Jade Sakori, Dvir Benedek		
Butterfly	Marco Berger	Argentina	Drama	Javier De Pietro, Ailín Salas, Malena Villa, Jorge Díez, María Laura Cali, Justo Calabria, Julian Infantino		
Carol	Todd Haynes	United Kingdom; United States	Drama	Cate Blanchett, Rooney Mara, Sarah Paulson, Jake Lacy, Kyle Chandler, John Magaro, Cory Michael Smith, Carrie Brownstein	Based on the novel The Price of Salt by Patricia Highsmith	
Chance	Jake Graf	United Kingdom	Short, drama, romance	Clifford Hume, Abs, Amale Mohamed, Jake Graf	Later added to Boys on Film 16: Possession (compilation)	
Chemsex	William Fairman and Max Gogarty	United Kingdom	Documentary		About the consumption of drugs (including poppers) to facilitate or enhance sexual activity	
Closet Monster	Stephen Dunn	Canada	Drama	Connor Jessup, Isabella Rossellini, Joanne Kelly, Aaron Abrams		
Clouds of Sils Maria	Olivier Assayas	United States	Drama	Juliette Binoche, Kristen Stewart, Chloë Grace Moretz, Johnny Flynn, Lars Eidinger, Hanns Zischler, Brady Corbet		
Daddy	Gerald McCullouch	United States	Drama	Gerald McCullouch, Dan Via, Jaime Cepero, Mackenzie Astin, Leslie Easterbrook	Screenplay by Dan Via, based on his play of the same name	
The Danish Girl	Tom Hooper	United States	Drama	Eddie Redmayne, Alicia Vikander, Matthias Schoenaerts, Ben Whishaw, Amber Heard, Sebastian Koch, Pip Torrens, Nicholas Woodeson, Emerald Fennell, Adrian Schiller	Based on the novel of the same name by David Ebershoff, loosely inspired by the lives of Lili Elbe and Gerda Wegener	
Downriver	Grant Scicluna	Australia	Drama	Robert Taylor, Kerry Fox, Helen Morse		
Driving Not Knowing	Benjamin R. Davis, Dylan Hansen-Fliedner, Dane Mainella, Jay Jadick	United States	Musical, drama	Dane Mainella, Jay Jadick, Emily Rea		
Eisenstein in Guanajuato	Peter Greenaway	Netherlands; Mexico	Drama	Elmer Bäck, Stelio Savante		
Fire Song	Adam Garnet Jones	Canada	Drama	Andrew Martin, Derek Miller, Jennifer Podemski		
F(l)ag Football	Seth Greenleaf	United States	Documentary	Wade Davis, Jared Garduno, Brenton Metzler, Cyd Zeigler	Documentary about National Gay Flag Football League	
Floating Melon	Roberto F. Canuto, Xu Xiaoxi	China; Spain	Short Drama	Vincent Chen Xi, Celia Yu Yinmeng, Wen Sirui		
For Which We Stand	Sean Robinson	United States	Documentary	Michael Musto, Dolly Parton, Melissa Etheridge, Frenchie Davis, Diana King, Chely Wright		
Freeheld	Peter Sollett	United States	Drama	Julianne Moore, Elliot Page, Michael Shannon, Steve Carell, Luke Grimes, Josh Charles, Mary Birdsong, Kelly Deadmon, Gabriel Luna, Anthony DeSando	Based on the 2007 documentary film directed by Cynthia Wade	
From Afar	Lorenzo Vigas	Venezuela	Drama	Alfredo Castro, Luis Silva	Won the Golden Lion at the 72nd Venice International Film Festival	
Gayby Baby	Maya Newell	Australia	Documentary		Follows four children raised by same-sex parents, originated from a short documentary, Growing Up Gayby, filmed by Newell for ABC2 in 2013	
The Girl King	Mika Kaurismäki	Finland; Canada; Sweden; Germany; France	Biography, drama	Malin Buska, Sarah Gadon, Michael Nyqvist	Biopic of Christina, Queen of Sweden	
He Hated Pigeons	Ingrid Veninger	Canada; Chile	Drama	Pedro Fontaine, Cristobal Tapia Montt		
Henry Gamble's Birthday Party	Stephen Cone	United States	Drama	Cole Doman, Pat Healy		
Holding the Man	Neil Armfield	Australia	Drama	Ryan Corr, Craig Stott	Based on the memoir of the same name by Timothy Conigrave	
How to Win at Checkers (Every Time)	Josh Kim	Thailand; Indonesia	Drama	Toni Rakkaen, Ingkarat Damrongsakkul, Thira Chutikul, Jinna Navarat (credited as Arthur Navarat), Natarat Lakha, Bell Nuntita (credited as Nuntita Khampiranon), Michael Shaowanasai, Anawat Patanawanichkul, Vatanya Thamdee		
I Am Michael	Justin Kelly	United States	Drama	James Franco, Zachary Quinto, Emma Roberts, Charlie Carver, Avan Jogia, Devon Graye, Leven Rambin, Daryl Hannah, Lesley Ann Warren, Blake Lee, Kevin Cahoon	Dramatization of a New York Times Magazine article about ex-gay activist Michael Glatze	
I Kissed a Girl	Noémie Saglio, Maxime Govare	France	Comedy	Pio Marmaï, Franck Gastambide, Adrianna Gradziel		
In the Grayscale (En la Gama de los Grises)	Claudio Marcone	Chile	Drama	Francisco Celhay, Emilio Edwards, Sergio Hernández, Daniela Ramirez		
Inner Jellyfishes (Les Méduses)	Marc-Antoine Lemire	Canada	Short drama	Rudi Duperré, Samuel Brassard, Jade Hassouné		
Jenny's Wedding	Mary Agnes Donoghue	United States	Comedy, drama	Katherine Heigl, Alexis Bledel, Tom Wilkinson, Linda Emond, Grace Gummer, Matthew Metzger		
The Last Summer of the Rich	Peter Kern	Austria	Drama	Amira Casar, Nicole Gerdon, Winfried Glatzeder, Helmut Berger		
The Little Deputy	Trevor Anderson	Canada	Short Documentary	Luke Oswald, Shannon Blanchet, Rob Chaulk, Fish Griwkowsky, Jenny McKillop, Trevor Schmidt	9 mins long, recreating a cowboy photo from 1880s	
The Lives We Lead	Davo Hardy	Australia	Drama	Sally Williams, Georgina Neville, Josh Wiseman		
Loev	Sudhanshu Saria	India	Romantic drama	Dhruv Ganesh, Shiv Panditt, Siddharth Menon, Rishabh J. Chaddha		
Naomi and Ely's No Kiss List	Kristin Hanggi	United States	Comedy, drama	Victoria Justice, Pierson Fodé, Matthew Daddario	Based on the book of the same name by Rachel Cohn and David Levithan	
Nasty Baby	Sebastián Silva	United States	Drama	Sebastián Silva, Tunde Adebimpe, Kristen Wiig, Denis O'Hare		
Naz & Maalik	Jay Dockendorf	United States	Drama	Curtiss Cook Jr., Kerwin Johnson Jr.		
North Mountain	Bretten Hannam	Canada	Action/thriller	Justin Rain, Glen Gould, Meredith MacNeill		
Out to Win	Malcolm Ingram	United States	Documentary	John Amaechi, Billy Bean, Jason Collins, Wade Davis, Brittney Griner, Billie Jean King, David Kopay, Martina Navratilova	Documentary on history of LGBT people in professional sports	
Packed in a Trunk: The Lost Art of Edith Lake Wilkinson	Michelle Boyaner	United States	Documentary		Documentary about deceased lesbian artist Edith Lake Wilkinson	
The Pedophile (Le Pédophile)	Ara Ball	Canada	Short drama	Kennedy Brodeur, Valérie Fortin, Patrick Renaud, Lesley Marie Reade, Monia Chokri	A lesbian who was sexually abused in childhood exacts revenge on her abuser	
Portrait of a Serial Monogamist	John Mitchell; Christina Zeidler	Canada	Romance, comedy	Diane Flacks, Carolyn Taylor		
Reel in the Closet	Stu Maddux	United States	Documentary		Home movies and other archival footage from the 1930s to '80s	
The Royal Road	Jenni Olson	United States	Documentary	voiceover cameo appearance by Tony Kushner	Experimental documentary about butch lesbian desire, nostalgia and California history	
The Saint of Dry Creek	Julie Zammarchi	United States	Short, animation	Patrick Haggerty	Adaptation of an oral recording made for StoryCorps	
The Sea Is Behind	Hicham Lasri	Morocco	Drama	Malek Akhmiss, Hassan Badida, Yassine Sekkal		
A Sinner in Mecca	Parvez Sharma	United States; India; Saudi Arabia	Documentary		Documentary about Parvez Sharma's pilgrimage to Mecca, Saudi Arabia as an openly gay Muslim.	
Stonewall	Roland Emmerich	United States	Drama	Jeremy Irvine, Ron Perlman, Jonathan Rhys Meyers		
Summertime	Catherine Corsini	France; Belgium	Drama	Cécile de France, Izïa Higelin, Noémie Lvovsky, Kévin Azaïs, Lætitia Dosch, Sarah Suco		
Sworn Virgin	Laura Bispuri	Italy	Drama	Alba Rohrwacher, Flonja Kodheli, Lars Eidinger		
The Summer of Sangailė	Alantė Kavaitė	France; Lithuania	Drama	Julija Steponaitytė, Aistė Diržiūtė		
Tangerine	Sean Baker	United States	Drama	Kitana Kiki Rodriguez, Mya Taylor	Shot with three iPhone5S smartphones	
Take Me to the River	Matt Sobel	United States	Drama	Logan Miller, Richard Schiff, Robin Weigert		
Thanatos, Drunk	Chang Tso-chi	Taiwan	Drama	Lee Hong-chi, Cheng Jen-shuo, Huang Shang-ho, Lu Hsueh-feng, Ching-Ting Wang, Chang Ning, Lin Chin-yu, Andrew Chen, Chin Tzu-yen		
Tchindas	Pablo García Pérez de Lara; Marc Serena	Spain; Cape Verde	Documentary	Tchinda Andrade, Elvis Tolentino, Edinha Pitanga	An award-winning feature documentary with Tchinda Andrade, the most respected trans woman from Cape Verde (West Africa) as main character.	
Those People	Joey Kuhn	United States	Drama	Jonathan Gordon, Jason Ralph, Haaz Sleiman		
Tig	Kristina Goolsby; Ashley York	United States	Documentary	Tig Notaro	Documentary about comedian Tig Notaro's battle with cancer	
Tough Love	Rosa von Praunheim	Germany	Drama	Hanno Koffler, Katy Karrenbauer, Oliver Sechting, Luise Heyer, Sascia Haj, Udo Lutz, Stefan Kuschner, Luise Schnittert		
ToY	Patrick Chapman	United States	Drama	Brianna Evigan, Kerry Norton, Daniel Hugh Kelly	A young LA artist changes mediums to accommodate her illness, eventually filming interviews of prostitutes, one of whom she falls for.	
Utopians	Scud	Hong Kong; Taiwan; China	Drama	Adonis He Fei, Jackie Chow, Fiona Wang	Sexually-explicit story about a young male student, Hins Gao, who falls in love with his professor, Antonio Ming. Features frequent full-frontal male nudity	
Vanity (La Vanité)	Lionel Baier	France; Switzerland	Drama	Patrick Lapp, Carmen Maura, Ivan Georgiev		
Ville-Marie	Guy Édoin	Canada	Drama	Monica Bellucci, Aliocha Schneider, Pascale Bussières		
Viva	Paddy Breathnach	Ireland	Drama	Héctor Medina, Jorge Perugorría		
What He Did (Det han gjorde)	Jonas Poher Rasmussen	Denmark	Documentary		Documentary about the murder of writer Christian Kampmann by his partner Jens Michael Schau	
Wonderful World End	Daigo Matsui	Japan	Drama	Ai Hashimoto		
