= Christopher North (composer) =

American composer and musician

- Born: Christopher North Renquist; February 6, 1969 (age 57)
- Origin: Austin, Texas
- Genres: Jazz classical rock
- Occupations: Composer, Songwriter, Multi-instrumentalist, Conductor, Educator
- Instruments: Electric bass, double bass, acoustic guitar, electric guitar, harmonica, piano, sitar, guitarviol, harpejji

Christopher North Renquist (born February 6, 1969), known professionally as Christopher North, is an American composer, songwriter, multi-instrumentalist musician, conductor, producer, and educator. Working most notably as a film composer, he has also composed and written for orchestra, theater, and dance, His songs are heard around the globe on children's television, in films, on radio, and on streaming platforms. North has conducted at Carnegie Hall, sang at Lincoln Center and played in Broadway theater as a bassist and guitarist.

== Biography ==
Born Christopher North Renquist in Austin, Texas, on February 6, 1969, Christopher North is a multi-instrumental composer and singer-songwriter based in New York City. As a composer his works have been performed at venues in Europe (London, Berlin and Edinburgh) and the US (Texas, California, Illinois, Ohio, Hawaii and New York) including collaborations with filmmakers (Tribeca, Big Apple and SXSW Film Festivals), theater companies (including Workshop Theater, NY and Edinburgh Fringe), choreographers (Wave Hill, Joyce SOHO) and concerts including the 92nd Street Y. His children's songs can be heard on the Disney Channel and Noggin, where he wrote songs for Oobi.

As a genre-crossing musician, North has performed and recorded with an eclectic array of artists and ensembles. He has played bass with Quincy Jones, the Chicks, Rosanne Cash, various symphony orchestras as well on Broadway in The Lion King and Spring Awakening. He has sung with the New York Philharmonic (including the 3 Grammy Award–winning John Adams' "On the Transmigration of Souls") and for Stephen Sondheim ("Frogs" with Nathan Lane). He has performed at venues including Lincoln Center, Carnegie Hall, CBGB's and Madison Square Garden. He has performed on national TV (including Live with Regis and Kelly and Live at Lincoln Center), and been heard on the radio (NPR, WNYC) and commercials (including Visa and Tide). He has recorded and performed extensively as a multi-instrumentalist (guitar, keyboards, harmonica, etc.) As a multi-instrumentalist, he plays traditional instruments as well as newly created boutique instruments, including the Marcodi Harpejji, the Guitarviol, the Slaperoo, the Suzuki Andes 25, bass Ukulele, Cello Banjo, a ROLI Rise, and a Veillette Gryphon. He has produced and released two albums, Opus Zero, a classical album featuring chamber music and art songs, and De La Sur, an eclectic rock/soul album. He has done sound design and music for The Forever Waltz by Glyn Maxwell, the score for Angelica Torn's Lucky Days and various projects with writer and director Matthew Miele, finishing the feature-length film Everything's Jake in 2006 and Eavesdrop in September 2007. His scores and albums feature world-class NYC musicians (Eroica Trio, Ethel (string quartet), Andy Middleton, Carol Emanuel).

== Works/Recordings/Performances ==
=== Film Scores ===
- The Stranger I Love — A film by Theresa Godly with Christopher North as Executive Producer, Composer and Music Supervisor
- The Last Ride – A film by Nyle Cavazos Garcia
- Max Roach: The Drum Also Waltzes - A film by Sam Pollard & Ben Shapiro
- The Dark Offerings — A film by Marcus Slabine and Elizabeth S. Piper
- Homebound — Directed by Usher Morgan
- Vial — A film by Sonja O'Hara and Micah Stuart
- En Suite - Directed by Geoffrey Cantor
- Paint — Directed by Michael Walker
- Unpainted — A film by Todd Krueger
- The Last Call (2019) — A film by Marcus Slabine
- Cracked Up: The Darrell Hammond Story – A film by Michelle Esrick, starring Darrell Hammond as himself in which Christopher North provided guitarviol bookend cues
- Lp - A crime short by Alexander Etseyatse
- Capturing the Flag – A film by Anne de Mare documenting vote registration
- Otis - A TV Series by Alexander Etseyatse in which North composed music for the episode Six Months Earlier
- Stopwatch - A short drama film by Alexander Etseyatse
- Cut Shoot Kill – A horror film by Michael Walker in which North composed much of his scores using the waterphone
- Addict – A short film by Steve Curley with an ambient score
- The Bell - A thriller short by Jeremy Merrifield
- Two Trains Runnin' – A Grammy nominated film (Best Original Music) directed by Samuel D. Pollard and written by Benjamin Hedin. North attended the Newport Folk Festival where he performed themes from the film
- Dark Passenger: Volume 1 - A horror film involving six stories that center around characters dealing with their personal demons
- The Flip - A drama short by Chung Lam
- The Break In - A horror short by Marcus Slabine
- A New High – A documentary film about homelessness and drug addiction directed by Samuel Miron and Stephen Scott Scapulla
- Missing People - A crime documentary by David Shapiro
- All in Time – A drama film by Christopher Fetchko and Marina Donahue
- Karl Manhair, Postal Inspector - A TV series in which North composed music for 6 episodes; Man Is a Bad Animal, The Dark Arts, Family Business, Sisyphus, Some Sort of Sex Thing, Be the Lion
- Think Ink – A short film directed by Wally Chung and story by Emily Hu which was awarded the Spirit of Slamdance at the Slamdance Film Festival
- The Bear - A drama short by Rachael Sonnenberg
- F(l)ag Football – A film by Seth Greenleaf starring Wade Davis, Jared Garduno, Brenton Metzler, Cyd Zeigler
- Inseparable - A drama short by Eran Evron
- Sky of the Damned – A TV series by Tasmin L. Silver in which North composed music for 5 episodes; Wake, Jillian, The FAE, Welcome to My City, Back to the Start
- Bird Song - A drama short by Rachael Sonnenberg and Max Stern
- L'Absinthe - A drama/thriller by Olivier Bertin
- Powerless - A documentary short by Adam Lawrence and Shayok Mukhopadhyay
- Bible Quiz – A film by Nicole Teeny which opened at the 2013 Slamdance Film Festival. North's score features marimba, harpsichord, organ, guitar, percussion, glockenspiel, whistling, and various glass sounds
- Four One Nine - A drama short by Alexander Etseyatse
- Move – A documentary by Theodore Collatos
- Goodbye Brooklyn - A drama short by Jon-Carlos Evans
- Houston & 6th - A thriller short by Nyle Cavazos Garcia
- Open Call - A comedy short by Geoff Lerer
- The 5Boroughs - A comedy/drama short by Nyle Cavazos Garcia
- The Man with the Red Right Hand - A comedy/thriller short by Nyle Cavazos Garcia
- Put It in Your Box - A comedy short by Matthew D'Abate
- S&M - A short thriller film by Matthew D'Abate
- Werewolf - A horror short by Matthew D'Abate
- Bemvindo – A short film by Alexandra Roxo
- Case Closed - A comedy/drama short by Kevin Stocklin
- Giant Place Detail – A documentary by Diana Quinones Rivera
- Mary's Journal: Episode 1 – Connected - A short horror/mystery film by Nyle Cavazos Garcia
- Abidjan - A short film by Alexander Etseyatse, premiering at 24 film festivals
- Eavesdrop: A Conversation with Writer/Director Matthew Miele - A video documentary short about the filming of Eavesdrop (2008)
- Cut - A short horror film by Matthew D'Abate
- Heart – A short drama film by Hugh Plantin
- Brother's Reaction - A short drama film by Eddie Griffith
- Nutmeg - A comedy short by Amy Benaroya
- Eavesdrop – A film by Matthew Miele starring Chris Parnell, Tovah Feldshuh, Terennce Mann
- The Dark - A short horror film and another collaboration with filmmaker Nyle Cavazos Garcia
- Lucky Days – A film by Angelica Torn starring actor/writer/director Angelica Torn, Luke Zarzecki, co-director Tony Torn, Rip Torn, Federico Castelluccio
- Everything's Jake – A film by Matthew Miele starring Ernie Hudson, score performed by composer (with string quartet and saxophone) distributed by Warner Brothers
- Skips – A short film by Steve Curley, guitar and percussion score (2003) official entry in 2003 Tribeca Film Festival
- Humidity – A short thriller film by Nyle Cavazos Garcia
- The Tip (1997) – Multi-tracked double bass and piano score for short film produced and directed by Kahvan Mashayekh premiered at the Independent Film Festival, Houston, Texas, official entry in the 1998 South by Southwest Film Festival in Austin, TX and in the 1998 Houston International Film Festival

=== Music for Dance ===
- Ferrum (2015) a Site-Specific Project at Pioneer Works (also played at Roulette) that draws on the historical, industrial components of the Pioneer space. The project was commissioned by Under Story (Formerly Carte Blanche Performance) Brooklyn NY
- Victorian Hypnosis at The Salon Mexicana (2015) immersive performance in collaboration with Atlas Obscura commissioned by Under Story (Formerly Carte Blanche Performance) ACME Studios, Brooklyn NY
- NEIL (2014) site-specific performance at New York Transit Museum's Inaugural Platform series commissioned by Under Story (Formerly Carte Blance Performance) New York NY
- Suddenly Green (1998) for recorder, guitar, and percussion (one musician / dancer performed by the composer) commissioned by the Field and choreographer Sherry Greenspan for the Dancing in the Streets Festival at Wave Hill, Bronx NY
- Seuss Suites (1998) multi-instrumental score/sound design for dance commissioned by Valerie Alpert and Company, Columbus OH
- I Take Nights in the Middle of my Walk (1997–1998) for double bass, guitar and percussion (one musician / dancer performed by the composer) commissioned by choreographer Sherry Greenspan, presented at Joyce Theater Soho, NYC
- What Are You Afraid Of? (1997) multi-instrumental score/sound design commissioned by Valerie Alpert and Company, Columbus OH
- Seed (1995) for violin, multi-media collaboration with choreographer Michelle Lee Adams for performance by New Arts Collective, Dallas TX

=== Classical/Orchestral composition ===
- (on the) Verge Of, world premiere Carnegie Recital Hall, Weill Recital Hall. Christopher North made his Carnegie Hall conducting debut with the ACMA (Association of Classical Musicians and Artists) Orchestra on Saturday, November 18, 2023. As the Principal Conductor Of ACMA, North led the enthusiastic 22-piece volunteer chamber orchestra in Weill Recital Hall performance of Mozart's Clarinet Concerto (featuring Gary Mayer as soloist) and the world premiere of his own composition, (on the) Verge Of, a fantasia on a theme dedicated 'for Lorna.' Dr. Lorna Breen, an emergency room physician and cellist, was known to North through their association with the New York Late Starters Orchestra.
- Nellie Juan's Scratchiti from "GLACIER (was) HERE" was composed for the Composing in the Wilderness Program August 2019. Inspired by kayaking in Prince William Sound. World premiere at Federal Hall November 22, 2019 for Corvus. For instruments; Flute doubling on Piccolo, Alto Saxophone, Violin, Violoncello, and Percussion.
- Eavesdrop Suite for orchestra world premiere with the composer conducting the Hollywood Chamber Orchestra in May 2017. It is a single-movement, multi-section suite, with some very short chapters. A main theme is followed by variations. Ultimately, that theme is transfigured, with reference to and reverence for, transmigration.
- Opus Zero (2002) by Christopher North, 13-track self-produced CD (including art song, chamber music, solo pieces)
- Renquist (2007) by Christopher North, 15-track self-produced compilation of 1988–1998 works (including art song, chamber music, solo works, electronic soundscapes for dance)
- Many new chamber works and Art songs for a Distinguished Artist recitals at the 92nd St Y in February 2001 and February 2008.

=== Jazz Composition ===
- Max Roach: The Drum Also Waltzes (2023) 15 cues composed, arranged, and produced by Christopher North
- Last Ride (2023) 10 cues composed, arranged, and produced by Christopher North
- 15 original jazz tunes composed for Eavesdrop score. Seven premiered live at February 2008 92nd Street Y recital.

=== Music/Sound Design for Theater ===
- The Forever Waltz (2005) Original music and sound design for the Glyn Maxwell Play (including "the feather lake song" with words by the poet) produced by Verse Theater Manhattan / Workshop Theater in NYC and produced by Restricted View in London and Presented at Edinburgh Fringe 2005, directed by Elysa Marden
- The Three Musketeers (1998) score/sound design for the play commissioned (with Meet the Composer) by The American Globe Theater, NYC
- The Husbands (world premiere in August 1998 at the New York International Fringe Festival) live score/sound design (one musician) for the Christopher Logue play, directed by Elysa Marden, produced by Richard Ryan / Verse Productions

=== Songwriter ===
- Songs for The Real Housewives of Orange County, Vanderpump Rules, American Pickers
- Songs for Sesame Street International, Disney Channel and Noggin Network for Josh Selig / Little Airplane Productions.
- Christopher North, de la sur (2002), 17-track self-produced CD
- Blue Skye, Yesterday's Yesteryear Blues (1994) 10-track self-produced CD, Band Leader, acoustic/electric bass and guitar

=== Bassist – Broadway/Theater ===
- Bass / Double Bass for Broadway/Theater/Cabaret (Vested LOCAL 802 AFM Member)
- Hair on Broadway, New York NY (2009-2010) Subbing for Wilbur Bascomb
- The Lion King on Broadway, New York NY (August 2001 – 2011) substitute player for Tom Barney
- Spring Awakening on Broadway, New York NY (January 2007 – January 2009) substitute player for George Farmer
- Rent on Broadway, New York NY (January 2004 – January 2005) substitute player for Steve Mack

=== Bassist – Ensembles ===
- Young People's Chorus of NYC (Dec. 2002 to 2008): Live with Regis and Kelly on ABC, UNICEF Snowflake Lighting on CBS, Commemoration of Cornerstone at Freedom Tower at Ground Zero on NY1, World Culture Open 2004 at Lincoln Center on PBS, Colgate Games at Madison Square Garden, WNYC's Sound Check, and Various at Carnegie Hall inc. accompanying Rosanne Cash

=== Bassist – Scores / Games / Sample Libraries ===
- Video Games, Trailers and TV shows (2012 to present) including Wolfenstein, Dishonored, 12 Monkeys (TV)
- Dynamic Sound Sampling – Orchestral String FX (2012), tracked 3 basses for this sample library
- Athena Reich, Little Girl Dreams (2008), tracked basses for this 14 song album
- Various commercials including Tide, Visa, Mastercard for Sacred Noise, NY (2003-2008)

=== Guitarist – Broadway/Theater ===
- The Lion King on Broadway, New York NY (December 2004 – 2011) substitute player for Kevin Kuehn, the chair requires guitar (electric and classical), ukulele and kalimba

=== Vocal Recordings – Solo/Ensemble ===
- Various demo and jingle recordings, New York, NY (1997–present) inc. Disney International and Sesame Street
- John Adams' "On the Transmigration of Souls", for Nonesuch Records with the New York Philharmonic / New York Choral Artists, winner of 3 Grammy Awards (2005)
- Stephen Sondheim's "The Frogs / Evening Primrose" (2000) for Nonesuch Records, featured Nathan Lane at The Hit Factory
- Alice Parker "My Love and I", (2000) Men's choral works from the Robert Shaw / Alice Parker catalog for Melodius Accord at Riverside Church
- "Kurt Masur at the New York Philharmonic," 10-CD box set features New York choral artists

=== As Multi-Instrumentalist ===
- Hector Ubarry, Cabaret New York NY (Oct. 2021), inc. Green Room 42, NYC
- Victoria Edwards, Cabaret New York NY (2010 to 2019), inc. Don't Tell Mama, Metropolitan Room, Capital Grille, NYC
- Trojan Women (2010) verse play by Christopher Logue, percussion/drums & Cigar BoxGuitar score, with song for mixed choir, produced in NYC
- Christopher North's De la Sur (2002), vocals, acoustic and electric basses, acoustic and electric guitars, drums / percussion, keyboards, sitar, recorder, harmonica.
- Enid Levine and the Boys, Take This Show on the Road (2000), Acoustic /electric /fretless bass, nylon, steel and 12 string guitar, harmonica, vocals
- Blue Skye, Yesterday's Yesteryear Blues (1995) Singer-songwriter, bass, keys, guitar & mixing
- Numerous soundtracks: Cut Shoot Kill, Two Trains Runnin', L'Absinthe

=== Producer – Children's Songs ===
- Ivan Ulz's Fire Truck, Scholastic Sing and Read Storybook

=== Educator – Songwriting, Film Scoring, Bass/Guitar, Private/Studio/School Instruction ===
- Associate Professor at Berklee College of Music, Boston (since January 2019), BerkleeOnline (Since January 2023)
- Private Studio, Denton and Dallas TX, New York and Brooklyn NY (1990 to present)
- 92nd Street Y, New York NY (1997–present)

== Education ==
- Master of Music in Music Composition, Brooklyn College
- Bachelor of Music in Music Composition – Southern Methodist University (1992–1994)
- University of North Texas (1987–1991)
