= List of LGBTQ Winter Olympians =

There have been 164 (Note: Based on the information collected on this page) modern Winter Olympians who have identified as lesbian, gay, bisexual, transgender, pansexual, non-binary, queer, or who have openly been in a same-sex relationship, including two who have also competed at the Summer Olympic Games. The first Winter Olympic Games in which an athlete now known to be LGBTQ+ competed was the 1956 Winter Olympics.

Figure skater John Curry was considered the first publicly out Olympian when he confirmed his sexuality at the 1976 Winter Olympics. Curry was among the skaters to later die of HIV/AIDS, the community heavily affected in the 1980s and 90s, with calls for U.S. Figure Skating to teach AIDS awareness. The Winter Olympics saw the first Pride House organized at an Olympic Games, with the 2010 Winter Olympics in Vancouver; though Pride Houses were restricted at the subsequent few editions of the Winter Olympics, it became a point of activism at the 2026 Winter Olympics. LGBTQ+ athletes were particularly vocal around the hosting of the 2014 Winter Olympics, held in regressive Russia and heavily protested, and in 2026, amidst progressive backsliding in Western nations. The comparatively large cohort of out LGBTQ+ athletes at the 2026 Games, and their expressions of Pride, drew greater attention to the intersection and challenges of LGBTQ+ Winter athletes – especially when, a week into the Games, "Team LGBTQ" had won more medals than the United States.

The most decorated able-bodied LGBTQ+ Olympian is Dutch speed skater Ireen Wüst, with 13 medals including 6 golds; Wüst also holds Olympic records. (Note: See List of Olympic records in speed skating) At least 89 LGBTQ+ Winter Olympians are medalists (54.27% of LGBTQ+ Winter Olympians), of which 51 have at least one gold medal (31.10%).

== Overview ==
All based on the List of LGBT Winter Olympians

By country
Country	Number of Olympians			
Country	F	M	NB	Total
Armenia	—	1	—	1
Australia	1	—	—	1
Austria	2	—	—	2
Belgium	3	1	—	4
Brazil	1	—	—	1
Canada	28	12	—	40
China	1	—	—	1
Czech Republic (Note: Including Czechoslovakia)	6	3	—	9
Estonia	1 (Note: Natalia Zabiiako represented both Estonia and the independent athletes from Russia, and is counted for both.)	—	—	1
Finland	11	—	—	11
France	4	3	—	7
Germany	3	1	—	4
Great Britain	1	5 (Note: Gus Kenworthy represented both Great Britain and the United States, and is counted for both.)	—	6
Iceland	1	—	—	1
Italy	1	1	—	2
Japan	—	1	—	1
Netherlands	4	—	—	4
New Zealand	—	1	—	1
Norway	3	—	—	3
Poland	1	—	—	1
ROC (Note: Including the Olympic Athletes from Russia)	1	—	—	1
Slovenia	1	—	—	1
Spain	—	1	—	1
Sweden	12	2	—	14
Switzerland	3	1	—	4
United States	27	16	1	44

By year
Games	Number of Olympians (Note: Including multi-year appearances of the same Olympian.)			
Games	F	M	NB	Total
1956	—	1	—	1
1964	—	1	—	1
1972	—	2	—	2
1976	—	4	—	4
1980	—	3	—	3
1984	1	3	—	4
1988	1	6	—	7
1992	2	2	—	4
1994	3	1	—	4
1998	14	—	—	14
2002	16	3	—	19
2006	19	7	—	26
2010	27	7	—	34
2014	33	6	—	39
2018	44	8	—	52
2022	49	13	1	63
2026	47	11	—	58

By sport
Sport	Number of Olympians by gender (Note: Including multi-disciplinary Olympians)					
Sport	Female		Male		Non-binary	Total
Sport	Cisgender	Transgender	Cisgender	Transgender	Non-binary	Total
Alpine skiing	3	—	1	—	—	4
Biathlon	3	—	—	—	—	3
Bobsleigh	2	—	1	—	—	3
Cross-country skiing	3	—	—	—	—	3
Curling	—	—	1	—	—	1
Figure skating	6	—	36	—	1 (Note: Competed in a men's category)	43
Freestyle skiing	5	—	2	1 (Note: Competed in a women's category)	—	8
Ice hockey	71	—	—	—	—	71
Luge	—	—	1	—	—	1
Skeleton	4	—	2	—	—	6
Ski jumping	1	—	1	—	—	2
Snowboarding	7	—	—	—	—	7
Speed skating	10	—	2	—	—	12

== Winter Olympic athletes ==
- Tables are default sorted by first Games appearance chronologically, then current surname or common nickname alphabetically, then first name alphabetically. They can be sorted by current surname (where used) or common nickname alphabetically; by country and sport alphabetically; by Games chronologically; (Note: Where athletes have represented multiple countries, competed in multiple sports, and/or at multiple Games, the country/sport/Games they are sorted by is their first country/sport/Games chronologically.) and by medals as organised in Olympics medals tables. (Note: Based on most golds over total medals, then alphabetically by current surname or common nickname. In cases of medals for demonstration events and honourable mentions in artistic events, these are sorted between one bronze and no medals.)

Athlete	Country	Sport	Games	Medal(s)	Notes
Ronald Robertson	United States	Figure skating	1956	2nd place, silver medalist(s)	Robertson was openly gay in his personal life. He won a silver medal at the Olympics, and semi-retired the following year to open a hotel with his partner, actor Tab Hunter.
Ondrej Nepela	Czechoslovakia	Figure skating	1964, 1972	1st place, gold medalist(s)	Nepela competed at two Olympic Games, winning a gold medal in 1972. He was gay and, in 1973, had a brief relationship with Canadian figure skater Toller Cranston. In 1989 he died from complications relating to AIDS.
Toller Cranston	Canada	Figure skating	1972, 1976	3rd place, bronze medalist(s)	Cranston competed at two Olympic Games and won a bronze medal in 1976. In his 2000 autobiography, he noted a fling with Slovak skater Ondrej Nepela, as well as short affairs with women.
Robin Cousins	Great Britain	Figure skating	1976, 1980	1st place, gold medalist(s)	
John Curry	Great Britain	Figure skating	1976	1st place, gold medalist(s)	Curry won the gold medal at his Olympic Games, a few days after being outed in a magazine which had interviewed him; there are conflicting reports about whether Curry intended to come out. He confirmed his sexuality (gay) in press interviews upon winning. The BBC have reported that Curry had believed he had spoken to the initial reporter off the record, and that the outing and having to give the press conference afterwards affected him greatly. He died of complications relating to AIDS in 1994; after Curry announced he had AIDS in 1992, revelations of other skaters who had died from the disease were made, and figure skating associations began providing AIDS education to its athletes. Known as the first publicly out Olympic athlete, and first out sports star; while the public knew of his sexuality, besides a brief scandal, it was little-mentioned. Curry won the BBC Sports Personality of the Year Award in 1976.
Randy Gardner	United States	Figure skating	1976, 1980		Gardner competed at the 1976 Winter Olympics, and withdrew from the 1980 Games. He came out in 2006.
Brian Pockar	Canada	Figure skating	1980		Pockar died of AIDS in 1992, and was outed in 1999 by Scott Hamilton.
Brian Boitano	United States	Figure skating	1984, 1988, 1994	1st place, gold medalist(s)	Came out in 2013 after being named to the delegation at the 2014 Winter Olympics held in Sochi, Russia; the location was being criticized for its homophobia.
Edel Therese Høiseth	Norway	Speed skating	1984, 1988, 1992, 1994, 1998		
Robert McCall	Canada	Figure skating	1984, 1988	3rd place, bronze medalist(s)	Won bronze with Tracy Wilson in 1988. He died from AIDS in 1991. Other athletes said that his homosexuality had been an open secret within their community.
Brian Orser	Canada	Figure skating	1984, 1988	2nd place, silver medalist(s)	Orser was outed in 1998 as part of a lawsuit involving a former partner that was made public. After competing, he has coached Olympic skating champions.
Matthew Hall	Canada	Figure skating	1988		Hall was an alternate in 1988, before competing at the 1994 Gay Games.
Peter Johansson	Sweden	Figure skating	1988		
Axel Médéric	France	Figure skating	1988		
Joan Guetschow	United States	Biathlon	1992, 1994		While Guetschow was publicly out as a lesbian and accepted by her teammates, she felt the team management discriminated against her.
Mark Mitchell	United States	Figure skating	1992		Mitchell qualified for the 1992 Games but was deselected and instead made an alternate as U.S. Figure Skating awarded Todd Eldredge a medical bye for the qualifying U.S. Figure Skating Championships. Mitchell likely also served as alternate in 1988 and 1994.
Russ Witherby	United States	Figure skating	1992		
Chris Witty	United States	Speed skating	1994, 1998, 2002, 2006	1st place, gold medalist(s) 2nd place, silver medalist(s) 3rd place, bronze medalist(s)	Witty has competed in both Summer and Winter Olympics; she was a flagbearer at her last Games in 2006. She has only won medals in speed skating. With her gold in 2002, she also set a world record. She lives with partner and fellow former speed skater Frouke Oonk.
Lisa Brown-Miller	United States	Ice hockey	1998	1st place, gold medalist(s)	
Nancy Drolet	Canada	Ice hockey	1998	2nd place, silver medalist(s)	Drolet and her wife began living together in 1995.
Lori Dupuis	Canada	Ice hockey	1998, 2002	1st place, gold medalist(s) 2nd place, silver medalist(s)	
Danielle Goyette	Canada	Ice hockey	1998, 2002, 2006	1st place, gold medalist(s) 2nd place, silver medalist(s)	A lawsuit brought at the end of her common-law partnership with a woman became notable in Canadian case law regarding the application of joint family venture in common-law partnerships.
Jayna Hefford	Canada	Ice hockey	1998, 2002, 2006, 2010, 2014	1st place, gold medalist(s) 2nd place, silver medalist(s)	Was with her partner, Kathleen Kauth, prior to 2014 Games.
Stine Brun Kjeldaas	Norway	Snowboarding	1998, 2002	2nd place, silver medalist(s)	Previously married to Cheryl Maas.
Sue Merz	United States	Ice hockey	1998, 2002	1st place, gold medalist(s) 2nd place, silver medalist(s)	
Shannon Miller	Canada	Ice hockey	1998	2nd place, silver medalist(s)	Head coach of Canada's women's ice hockey team in 1998, winning a silver medal with the team. In 2015, she and others brought a discrimination lawsuit against the University of Minnesota Duluth, believing that being gay was among the reasons for her abrupt termination. She won the case in 2018.
Maria Rooth	Sweden	Ice hockey	1998, 2002, 2006, 2010	2nd place, silver medalist(s) 3rd place, bronze medalist(s)	Has been with her wife since 2010.
Angela Ruggiero	United States	Ice hockey	1998, 2002, 2006, 2010	1st place, gold medalist(s) 2nd place, silver medalist(s) 3rd place, bronze medalist(s)	Competed at four Winter Olympics, medalling in each. After competing, Ruggiero was a member of the International Olympic Committee, from 2010 to 2018, and served as a member of the executive board of the IOC after being elected the Chairperson of the IOC Athletes' Commission, the body that represents all Olympic athletes worldwide, from 2016 to 2018.
Stacy Wilson	Canada	Ice hockey	1998	2nd place, silver medalist(s)	
Marieke Wijsman	Netherlands	Speed skating	1998, 2002		
Julie Chu	United States	Ice hockey	2002, 2006, 2010, 2014	2nd place, silver medalist(s) 3rd place, bronze medalist(s)	Married to Canadian ice hockey player Caroline Ouellette; the two competed against each other in Olympic finals on three occasions. Chu was a flagbearer in 2014.
Timothy Goebel	United States	Figure skating	2002	3rd place, bronze medalist(s)	Goebel was not known to be out when he competed.
Erika Holst	Sweden	Ice hockey	2002, 2006, 2010	2nd place, silver medalist(s) 3rd place, bronze medalist(s)	Was widely out before 2010.
Ylva Lindberg	Sweden	Ice hockey	2002, 2006	2nd place, silver medalist(s) 3rd place, bronze medalist(s)	Came out after the Olympics in 2006.
Caroline Ouellette	Canada	Ice hockey	2002, 2006, 2010, 2014	1st place, gold medalist(s)	Married to American ice hockey player Julie Chu; the two competed against each other in Olympic finals on three occasions.
Anja Pärson	Sweden	Alpine skiing	2002, 2006, 2010	1st place, gold medalist(s) 2nd place, silver medalist(s) 3rd place, bronze medalist(s)	Came out in 2012.
Emanuel Sandhu	Canada	Figure skating	2002, 2006		
Matthew Savoie	United States	Figure skating	2002, 2006		Was an alternate in 2002 and competed in 2006. Married a man in 2012.
Vibeke Skofterud	Norway	Cross-country skiing	2002, 2010	1st place, gold medalist(s)	Came out in 2008.
Tricia Stumpf	United States	Skeleton	2002		Selected to the team but was unable to compete due to injury. Married longtime partner Joan Guetschow in 2004, they ran a small beer business together at the 2002 Olympics.
Gillian Apps	Canada	Ice hockey	2006, 2010, 2014	1st place, gold medalist(s)	Married American ice hockey player Meghan Duggan in September 2018; they had competed against each other in the final of the 2010 and 2014 Games.
Jeffrey Buttle	Canada	Figure skating	2006	3rd place, bronze medalist(s)	Was not known to be gay when competing, was widely out by 2014.
Caitlin Cahow	United States	Ice hockey	2006, 2010	2nd place, silver medalist(s) 3rd place, bronze medalist(s)	Cahow is openly lesbian and was named to the 2014 United States delegation with Brian Boitano and Billie Jean King; selected by Barack Obama, the all-gay delegation was seen as deliberately provocative to make a statement about holding the Olympics in a homophobic nation.
Chanda Gunn	United States	Ice hockey	2006	3rd place, bronze medalist(s)	
Kathleen Kauth	United States	Ice hockey	2006	3rd place, bronze medalist(s)	Has been in a relationship with Jayna Hefford.
Charline Labonté	Canada	Ice hockey	2006, 2010, 2014	1st place, gold medalist(s)	Came out after the Games in 2014.
Cheryl Maas	Netherlands	Snowboarding	2006, 2014, 2018		Previously married to Stine Brun Kjeldaas. Before competing in 2014, she criticised the IOC for allowing a homophobic nation to host the Olympics.
Ryan O'Meara	United States	Figure skating	2006		Came out in 2008.
Jamal Othman	Switzerland	Figure skating	2006		
Martina Sáblíková	Czech Republic	Speed skating	2006, 2010, 2014, 2018, 2022, 2026	1st place, gold medalist(s) 2nd place, silver medalist(s) 3rd place, bronze medalist(s)	Came out in 2025, announcing her 12-year relationship with Nikola Zdráhalová.
Shawn Sawyer	Canada	Figure skating	2006		
Sarah Vaillancourt	Canada	Ice hockey	2006, 2010	1st place, gold medalist(s)	Was widely out prior to competing.
Johnny Weir	United States	Figure skating	2006, 2010		Came out in 2011, after years of homophobic speculation. He was criticized for not supporting a boycott of the 2014 Winter Olympics in Sochi, a city in homophobic Russia.
Ireen Wüst	Netherlands	Speed skating	2006, 2010, 2014, 2018, 2022	1st place, gold medalist(s) 2nd place, silver medalist(s) 3rd place, bronze medalist(s)	Was widely out prior to 2010, at which point she was said to be in a relationship with Sanne van Kerkhof.
Anastasia Bucsis	Canada	Speed skating	2010, 2014		Came out in 2013, in opposition to Russian anti-gay laws. Was previously in a relationship with Charline Labonté.
Callan Chythlook-Sifsof	United States	Snowboarding	2010		Chythlook-Sifsof competed in 2010. She was not selected for the Olympic team for 2014, but came out during this Games in protest of Russia's anti-gay laws.
Meghan Duggan	United States	Ice hockey	2010, 2014, 2018	1st place, gold medalist(s) 2nd place, silver medalist(s)	Married Canadian ice hockey player Gillian Apps in September 2018; they had competed against each other in the final of the 2010 and 2014 Games.
Michi Halilović	Germany	Skeleton	2010		
Elin Holmlöv	Sweden	Ice hockey	2010		Married a woman in 2018.
Venla Hovi	Finland	Ice hockey	2010, 2014, 2018	3rd place, bronze medalist(s)	Married to American ice hockey player Amanda Pelkey.
Barbara Jezeršek	Slovenia	Cross-country skiing	2010, 2014, 2018		Was widely out prior to the 2014 Games.
Michelle Karvinen	Finland	Ice hockey	2010, 2014, 2018, 2022, 2026	3rd place, bronze medalist(s)	Widely out by 2026.
Hilary Knight	United States	Ice hockey	2010, 2014, 2018, 2022, 2026	1st place, gold medalist(s) 2nd place, silver medalist(s)	
Simona Meiler	Switzerland	Snowboarding	2010, 2014, 2018		Was widely out before 2018.
Eric Mitchell	Canada	Ski jumping	2010		Came out in 2015.
Šárka Pančochová	Czech Republic	Snowboarding	2010, 2014, 2018, 2022		Came out in 2017.
Paul Poirier	Canada	Figure skating	2010, 2018, 2022, 2026	1st place, gold medalist(s) 3rd place, bronze medalist(s)	Widely out prior to the 2022 Games.
Marie-Philip Poulin	Canada	Ice hockey	2010, 2014, 2018, 2022, 2026	1st place, gold medalist(s) 2nd place, silver medalist(s)	As of 2023, engaged to teammate Laura Stacey.
Emilia Ramboldt	Sweden	Ice hockey	2010, 2014, 2018		Married a woman in 2015. Competed in 2010 and 2014 as Emilia Andersson.
Georgia Simmerling	Canada	Alpine skiing, Freestyle skiing	2010, 2014		Simmerling has represented Canada in three different sports; alpine skiing in 2010, freestyle skiing (specifically, ski cross) in 2014, and track cycling in 2016 and 2020. She had also intended to compete in ski cross in 2018, but a crash in the days before team selection saw her break both legs and retire from skiing. She was widely out prior to the 2020 Games, and has been in a relationship with Stephanie Labbé since 2016.
Blake Skjellerup	New Zealand	Speed skating	2010		Came out just after the 2010 Games, saying he waited until after competing to focus on his performance but also to not turn off potential sponsors.
Sanne van Kerkhof	Netherlands	Speed skating	2010, 2014		Was widely out prior to 2010, at which point she was said to be in a relationship with Ireen Wüst.
Kerry Weiland	United States	Ice hockey	2010	2nd place, silver medalist(s)	
Brittany Bowe	United States	Speed skating	2014, 2018, 2022, 2026	3rd place, bronze medalist(s)	Was widely out prior to 2018.
Belle Brockhoff	Australia	Snowboarding	2014, 2018, 2022		Brockhoff came out in 2013, ahead of the 2014 Winter Games. Though she campaigned strongly against Russia and its anti-gay laws in this period, she told the media she would reign in her protests while at the Games, for her safety.
Jason Brown	United States	Figure skating	2014, 2022	3rd place, bronze medalist(s)	Widely out prior to the 2022 Games.
Alex Carpenter	United States	Ice hockey	2014, 2022, 2026	1st place, gold medalist(s) 2nd place, silver medalist(s)	Widely out prior to the 2022 Games.
Mélodie Daoust	Canada	Ice hockey	2014, 2018, 2022	1st place, gold medalist(s) 2nd place, silver medalist(s)	Widely out prior to competing.
John Fennell	Canada	Luge	2014		Came out after the Games in 2014.
Gracie Gold	United States	Figure skating	2014	3rd place, bronze medalist(s)	Gold came out as bisexual in her 2024 memoir, saying she had dated both men and women and that, during her days of competitive figure skating, her agent told her to hide her sexuality, believing that her coming out would be detrimental to her career.
Jorik Hendrickx	Belgium	Figure skating	2014, 2018		Came out shortly before the Games in 2018.
Daniela Iraschko-Stolz	Austria	Ski jumping	2014, 2018, 2022	2nd place, silver medalist(s)	Married a woman in 2013.
Mira Jalosuo	Finland	Ice hockey	2014, 2018	3rd place, bronze medalist(s)	
Brianne Jenner	Canada	Ice hockey	2014, 2018, 2022, 2026	1st place, gold medalist(s) 2nd place, silver medalist(s)	Married a woman in 2019.
Gus Kenworthy	United States / Great Britain	Freestyle skiing	2014, 2018, 2022, 2026	2nd place, silver medalist(s)	Kenworthy came out publicly in 2015. He notably kissed his boyfriend on the slope in 2018, causing the moment to be broadcast live. He competed for the United States in 2014 and 2018, and for Great Britain in 2022.
Amanda Kessel	United States	Ice hockey	2014, 2018, 2022	1st place, gold medalist(s) 2nd place, silver medalist(s)	
Geneviève Lacasse	Canada	Ice hockey	2014, 2018	1st place, gold medalist(s) 2nd place, silver medalist(s)	
Sandra Näslund	Sweden	Freestyle skiing	2014, 2018, 2022, 2026	1st place, gold medalist(s) 3rd place, bronze medalist(s)	Widely out prior to the 2022 Games.
Eric Radford	Canada	Figure skating	2014, 2018, 2022	1st place, gold medalist(s) 2nd place, silver medalist(s) 3rd place, bronze medalist(s)	Came out after the Games in 2014.
Javier Raya	Spain	Figure skating	2014		Came out widely in 2016.
Kaitlyn Weaver	Canada	Figure skating	2014, 2018	1st place, gold medalist(s)	Came out widely as queer after competing, saying she felt stereotyped as a figure skater and staying closeted harmed her mental health. Weaver has since become an advocate for queer people in the sport.
Natalia Zabiiako	Estonia / Olympic Athletes from Russia	Figure skating	2014, 2018	2nd place, silver medalist(s)	Zabiiako was set to compete in 2014 for Estonia, but her pairs skating partner's registration was cancelled. She competed with a different partner for the Olympic Athletes from Russia in 2018, winning team silver. She retired in 2019 before considering competing again, this time for Canada, in 2022. In 2022, she came out publicly when her partner, Daria Kasatkina, did.
Cayla Barnes	United States	Ice hockey	2018, 2022, 2026	1st place, gold medalist(s) 2nd place, silver medalist(s)	
Guillaume Cizeron	France	Figure skating	2018, 2022, 2026	1st place, gold medalist(s) 2nd place, silver medalist(s)	Widely out by 2020. Competed in a dance partnership with Gabriella Papadakis.
Emily Clark	Canada	Ice hockey	2018, 2022, 2026	1st place, gold medalist(s) 2nd place, silver medalist(s)	Widely out prior to the 2022 Games.
Johanna Fällman	Sweden	Ice hockey	2018		
Kali Flanagan	United States	Ice hockey	2018	1st place, gold medalist(s)	
Mathilde Gremaud	Switzerland	Freestyle skiing	2018, 2022, 2026	1st place, gold medalist(s) 2nd place, silver medalist(s) 3rd place, bronze medalist(s)	
Sanni Hakala	Finland	Ice hockey	2018, 2022	3rd place, bronze medalist(s)	
Lisa Johansson	Sweden	Ice hockey	2018, 2022, 2026		
Breezy Johnson	United States	Alpine skiing	2018, 2022, 2026	1st place, gold medalist(s)	Johnson was injured in training for the 2022 Winter Olympics and could not compete. She came out as bisexual later that year.
Christopher Kinney	United States	Bobsleigh	2018		
Kim Meylemans	Belgium	Skeleton	2018, 2022, 2026		Widely out before competing, Meylemans competed against her girlfriend Nicole Silveira in 2022.
Sidney Morin	United States	Ice hockey	2018	1st place, gold medalist(s)	
Gabriella Papadakis	France	Figure skating	2018, 2022	1st place, gold medalist(s) 2nd place, silver medalist(s)	Competed in a dance partnership with Guillaume Cizeron.
Amanda Pelkey	United States	Ice hockey	2018	1st place, gold medalist(s)	Married to Finnish ice hockey player Venla Hovi.
Adam Rippon	United States	Figure skating	2018	3rd place, bronze medalist(s)	Came out in 2015.
Hig Roberts	United States	Alpine skiing	2018		Alternate. Came out in 2020 after retiring in 2019.
Jill Saulnier	Canada	Ice hockey	2018, 2022	1st place, gold medalist(s) 2nd place, silver medalist(s)	Widely out prior to the 2022 Games.
Ronja Savolainen	Finland	Ice hockey	2018, 2022, 2026	3rd place, bronze medalist(s)	Widely out prior to the 2020 Games. In a relationship with Anna Kjellbin.
Laura Stacey	Canada	Ice hockey	2018, 2022, 2026	1st place, gold medalist(s) 2nd place, silver medalist(s)	As of 2023, engaged to teammate Marie-Philip Poulin.
Noora Tulus	Finland	Ice hockey	2018, 2022, 2026	3rd place, bronze medalist(s)	
Sophie Vercruyssen	Belgium	Bobsleigh	2018		
Kendall Wesenberg	United States	Skeleton	2018		
Lara Wolf	Austria	Freestyle skiing	2018, 2022, 2026		Widely out prior to the 2022 Games.
Nikola Zdráhalová	Czech Republic	Speed skating	2018, 2022, 2026		Came out in 2025, when partner Martina Sáblíková announced their 12-year relationship.
Erin Ambrose	Canada	Ice hockey	2022, 2026	1st place, gold medalist(s) 2nd place, silver medalist(s)	Widely out prior to competing.
Filippo Ambrosini	Italy	Figure skating	2022, 2026		Widely out prior to competing.
Kévin Aymoz	France	Figure skating	2022, 2026		Widely out prior to competing.
Megan Bankes	Canada	Biathlon	2022		Widely out prior to competing.
Ashton Bell	Canada	Ice hockey	2022	1st place, gold medalist(s)	
Ebba Berglund	Sweden	Ice hockey	2022		Widely out prior to competing.
Andrew Blaser	United States	Skeleton	2022		Widely out prior to competing, Blaser raced with a rainbow flag on his sled.
Kristen Campbell	Canada	Ice hockey	2022	1st place, gold medalist(s)	
Makayla Gerken Schofield	Great Britain	Freestyle skiing	2022, 2026		Widely out prior to competing.
Lewis Gibson	Great Britain	Figure skating	2022, 2026		Gibson came out in the media shortly before his debut Games, though said he had really come out years earlier by posting photos with his husband to Instagram. He added that he had been nervous to discuss sexuality with the media before over fears it would negatively impact his pairs skating scores.
Amber Glenn	United States	Figure skating	2022, 2026	1st place, gold medalist(s)	Widely out prior to competing, Glenn was selected as a reserve in 2022.
Kristrún Guðnadóttir	Iceland	Cross-country skiing	2022, 2026		
Anni Keisala	Finland	Ice hockey	2022, 2026	3rd place, bronze medalist(s)	
Anna Kjellbin	Sweden	Ice hockey	2022, 2026		Widely out prior to competing. In a relationship with Ronja Savolainen.
Tim Koleto	Japan	Figure skating	2022	2nd place, silver medalist(s)	Widely out by 2023.
Aneta Lédlová	Czech Republic	Ice hockey	2022		Widely out prior to competing.
Timothy LeDuc	United States	Figure skating	2022	2nd place, silver medalist(s)	LeDuc is non-binary and was widely out prior to competing.
Alysa Liu	United States	Figure skating	2022, 2026	1st place, gold medalist(s)	
Lina Ljungblom	Sweden	Ice hockey	2022, 2026		
Emerance Maschmeyer	Canada	Ice hockey	2022, 2026	1st place, gold medalist(s) 2nd place, silver medalist(s)	
Hannah Miller	China	Ice hockey	2022		Competed as Mi Le; a player for a Chinese team when China qualified an Olympic team as host nation, the ability for Canadian Miller – as well as numerous other players on both men's and women's ice hockey teams – to acquire citizenship and represent China was considered secretive. Miller is widely out in Canada.
Bruce Mouat	Great Britain	Curling	2022, 2026	2nd place, silver medalist(s)	Widely out prior to competing, Mouat credits coming out to his teammates as his breakthrough moment in sport. After working with a sport psychologist, he felt that holding back some of his emotions was preventing him from having the best team dynamic.
Klára Peslarová	Czech Republic	Ice hockey	2022, 2026		
Simon Proulx-Sénécal	Armenia	Figure skating	2022		Widely out prior to competing.
Jamie Lee Rattray	Canada	Ice hockey	2022	1st place, gold medalist(s)	Widely out prior to competing.
Nicole Silveira	Brazil	Skeleton	2022, 2026		Widely out before competing, Silveira competed against her girlfriend Kim Meylemans in 2022.
Filip Taschler	Czech Republic	Figure skating	2022, 2026		
Viivi Vainikka	Finland	Ice hockey	2022, 2026	3rd place, bronze medalist(s)	
Micah Zandee-Hart	Canada	Ice hockey	2022	1st place, gold medalist(s)	Widely out prior to competing.
Sanni Ahola	Finland	Ice hockey	2026		
Chloé Aurard-Bushee	France	Ice hockey	2026		
Lore Baudrit	France	Ice hockey	2026		
Tineke den Dulk	Belgium	Speed skating	2026	3rd place, bronze medalist(s)	
Nina Jobst-Smith	Germany	Ice hockey	2026		
Kristýna Kaltounková	Czech Republic	Ice hockey	2026		
Ida Kuoppala	Finland	Ice hockey	2026		
Laura Lobis	Italy	Ice hockey	2026		
Elis Lundholm	Sweden	Freestyle skiing	2026		
Conor McDermott-Mostowy	United States	Speed skating	2026		
Emily Nix	Germany	Ice hockey	2026		
Nick Novak	Czech Republic	Freestyle skiing	2026		
Shilo Rousseau	Canada	Biathlon	2026		
Clara Rozier	France	Ice hockey	2026		
Maddy Schaffrick	United States	Snowboarding	2026		
Carina Strobel	Germany	Ice hockey	2026		
Elli Suoranta	Finland	Ice hockey	2026		
Linda Weiszewski	Poland	Bobsleigh	2026		
Laura Zimmermann	Switzerland	Ice hockey	2026	3rd place, bronze medalist(s)	

== Sources ==
- IOC (2022b). "Brian ORSER". Olympics.com.
- IOC (2022f). "Chris WITTY". Olympics.com.
- IOC (2022n). "Ireen WUST". Olympics.com.
- IOC (2022p). "Callan CHYTHLOOK-SIFSOF". Olympics.com.
- IOC (2022q). "Barbara Jezersek". Olympics.com.
- IOC (2022r). "Simona MEILER". Olympics.com.
- IOC (2022t). "Gus Kenworthy". Olympics.com.
- SOV (2014). "Register olympionikov zo Slovenska" [List of Olympians from Slovakia] (PDF) (in Slovak). Slovak Olympic Committee. Archived from the original (PDF) on 5 July 2016.
- Cranston, Toller; Lowder Kimball, Martha (2000). When Hell Freezes Over: Should I Bring My Skates?. McClelland & Stewart. ISBN 0-7710-2337-5.
- Hamilton, Scott; Benet, Lorenzo (1999). Landing It: My Life on and Off the Ice. Kensington Publishing. ISBN 1-57566-466-6.
- Hunter, Tab; Muller, Eddie (2005). Tab Hunter Confidential: The Making of a Movie Star. Algonquin Books. ISBN 1-56512-548-7.
- Jones, Bill (2015). Alone: The Triumph and Tragedy of John Curry. Bloomsbury. ISBN 978-1-4088-5356-6.
- Press (17 March 1956). "Controversy Boils Up Over Amateur Status Of No. 2 Figure Skater". The News-Press. Associated Press.
- DiStefano, Blase (2005). "Fab Tab". OutSmart. Archived from the original on 7 November 2006.
- Scupham-Bilton, Tony (2012a). "The History of LGBT Participation in the Olympics" (PDF). Federation of Gay Games. Archived from the original (PDF) on 2014-02-21.
- Martinez, Jose (1 December 2013). "Athletes with HIV/AIDS: Ondrej Nepela". Complex.
- Blanchard, Theresa W., ed. (April 1972). "XI Olympic Winter Games". Skating. Vol. 49. U.S. Figure Skating.
- Ewing, Lori; Davidson, Neil (24 January 2015). "Legendary Canadian figure skater Toller Cranston dead at 65". The Globe and Mail. The Canadian Press. Archived from the original on 26 January 2015.
- Zeigler, Cyd (16 February 2022a). "Here's the list of 39 gay Olympic figure skaters in history". Outsports.
- Vinocur, John (13 February 1976). "The Loner Who Struck Gold". Birmingham Daily Post.
- Walker-Khan, Miriam; Skelton, Jack (28 February 2022). "How LGBT icon Curry transformed skating". BBC Sport.
- Russell, Susan (10 June 2007). "John Curry: Triumph and Tragedy". International Figure Skating. Archived from the original on 2 January 2019.
- Hersh, Philip (1999). "Skater's Death Revives Questions". Chicago Tribune.
- Elliott, Helene (20 March 2008). "Tai and Randy's bond is sure and steady off the ice". Los Angeles Times.
- Bondy, Filip (17 November 1992). "FIGURE SKATING; AIDS Deaths Tear at Figure-Skating World". The New York Times.
- Brennan, Christine (19 December 2013). "Brian Boitano announces he's gay before trip to Sochi". USA Today.
- Buzinski, Jim (16 February 2010). "5 out lesbians at Winter Olympics". Outsports.
- Wieder, Judy, ed. (2 February 1999). "Ready, set, come out". The Advocate. Here.
- Pells, Eddie (18 December 2013). "Obama Selects Gay Athletes for Sochi Delegation". ABC News.
- Advocate Staff (31 January 2018). "A Comprehensive List of LGBT Winter Olympians". The Advocate.
- Sieczkowski, Cavan (19 December 2013). "Figure Skater Brian Boitano Comes Out As Gay Ahead Of Sochi Olympics". HuffPost.
- Belge, Kathy (2004). "One Lesbian Olympian's Story". About.com. Archived from the original on 2012-02-09.
- Hardwick, Courtney (16 February 2018). "Important Moments In The History Of LGBT Olympians". IN Magazine. Archived from the original on 21 September 2021.
- van Lakerveld, Erik, ed. (21 December 2012). "Witty: Een Heel Nieuwe Identiteit" [Witty: A Whole New Identity]. Schaatsen (in Dutch). Archived from the original on 2014-02-28.
- Delait, Patrick; Leenders, Jimmy (12 February 2021). "Oud-schaatsster Oonk over haar relatie met olympisch kampioene Witty: 'Chris en ik durfden in Amerika niet hand in hand over straat te lopen'" [Former skater Oonk about her relationship with Olympic champion Witty: 'Chris and I did not dare to walk hand in hand in America']. De Limburger (in Belgian Dutch).
- Del Mundo, Rob (11 May 2014). "Four-time Olympic gold medallist Jayna Hefford enjoying family life". Canadian Women's Hockey League. Archived from the original on 14 May 2014.
- Zeigler, Cyd (22 June 2022d). "Olympic champ Angela Ruggiero has built the 'Moneyball' of sports business". Outsports.
- Kassam, Ashifa (15 November 2017). "Canada-US ice hockey rivalry thaws as former captains have child together". The Guardian.
- Labonté, Charline (11 June 2014). "I am Charline Labonte, Olympic hockey player and proudly gay". Outsports.
- Lau, Tim (8 May 2015). "Interview: Julie Chu on Her Olympic Hockey Journey and 'Breaking Down Walls'". Asia Society.
- Lowe, Devin (12 June 2018). "These LGBTQ Athletes in the Olympic Movement Embrace Both Their Competitive and Personal Identities with Pride". Team USA. Archived from the original on August 8, 2020.
- Zeigler, Cyd (17 July 2008). "Olympic figure skater comes out". Outsports. Archived from the original on 24 June 2011.
- Zeigler, Cyd (4 December 2014). "Eric Radford: Olympic figure skater, medal-winning family man. And gay". Outsports.
- Zeigler, Cyd (8 July 2015). "The incredible feat of this gay Olympic ski jumper". Outsports.
- Zeigler, Cyd (26 January 2022i). "Olympian Lewis Gibson talks for the 1st time about being gay, Team LGBTQ". Outsports.
- Outsports (14 February 2018). "2018 Olympics will have a record 15 out LGBTQ athletes".
- Outsports (2021-07-12). "At least 185 out LGBTQ athletes at Tokyo Olympics, a record by far".
- Outsports (26 January 2022). "At least 35 out LGBTQ athletes in Beijing Winter Olympics".
