= Jane Anderson =

American playwright, screenwriter, filmmaker and actress

- Occupations: Playwright, screenwriter, filmmaker, actress
- Years active: 1982–present

Jane Anderson is an American playwright, screenwriter, filmmaker, and actress. She wrote and directed the feature film The Prize Winner of Defiance, Ohio (2005), and wrote the film It Could Happen to You (1994), starring Nicolas Cage. She won the Primetime Emmy Award for Outstanding Writing for a Limited or Anthology Series or Movie for her work on the miniseries Olive Kitteridge (2014).

== Career ==
Jane Anderson got her start as an actress, before getting her first writing job as a writer and consultant on the sitcom The Facts of Life (on which she had also appeared). She followed this up by creating the short-lived sitcom Raising Miranda, which was cancelled in its first season. She then had several other TV series gigs, and wrote her first play, The Baby Dance (1989).

Her first film experience was writing the 1993 HBO film The Positively True Adventures of the Alleged Texas Cheerleader-Murdering Mom, starring Holly Hunter; the film was critically acclaimed, and TV critics Matt Zoller Seitz and Alan Sepinwall in their 2016 book TV (The Book) named it the 2nd greatest American TV movie of all time, behind Steven Spielberg's Duel. She later wrote and directed several other critically acclaimed television movies, including The Baby Dance (1998), based on her play and starring Stockard Channing and Laura Dern; When Billie Beat Bobby (2001) starring Holly Hunter and Ron Silver; and Normal (2003), based on her play Looking for Normal and starring Jessica Lange and Tom Wilkinson. She also wrote the segment "1961" of the 2000 HBO film If These Walls Could Talk 2, which won Vanessa Redgrave an Emmy Award for her portrayal of an elderly lesbian prevented from hospital visitation with her dying long-time companion.

She became a writer for the AMC television drama Mad Men for the show's second season in 2008. She was nominated for a Writers Guild of America Award for Best Dramatic Series for her work on the second season.

In 2015, Anderson wrote the documentary Packed in a Trunk: The Lost Art of Edith Lake Wilkinson about her great-aunt, Edith Lake Wilkinson, a lesbian and painter who was institutionalized in the 1920s and spent the rest of her life in an asylum for the mentally ill. Anderson cites Wilkinson as an inspiration for her own drawing.

In 2017, Anderson wrote the Glenn Close-starring The Wife.

== Works and performances ==
=== Film ===
Year	Title	Director	Writer	Producer	Notes
1994	It Could Happen to You	No	Yes	No	
1995	How to Make an American Quilt	No	Yes	No	
2005	The Prize Winner of Defiance, Ohio	Yes	Yes	No	
2015	Packed in a Trunk: The Lost Art of Edith Lake Wilkinson	No	Yes	Yes	Documentary
2017	The Wife	No	Yes	No	

=== Television ===
Year	Title	Writer	Producer	Notes
1986	The Facts of Life	Yes	No	Episodes "The Apartment", "Ready or Not" and "Write and Wrong"
1988	Raising Miranda	Yes	Yes	Episodes "Black Monday" and "Home for the Holidays"
1989	The Wonder Years	Yes	No	Episode "How I'm Spending My Summer Vacation"
1991	The Hidden Room	Yes	No	Episodes "Dream Child" and "A Type of Love Story"
2008	Mad Men	Yes	Yes	Episode "The Gold Violin"
2014	Olive Kitteridge	Yes	Yes	Miniseries

TV movies

Year	Title	Director	Writer	Notes
1993	The Positively True Adventures of the Alleged Texas Cheerleader-Murdering Mom	No	Yes	
1998	The Baby Dance	Yes	Yes	
2000	If These Walls Could Talk 2	Yes	Yes	Segment "1961"
2001	When Billie Beat Bobby	Yes	Yes	
2003	Normal	Yes	Yes	

=== Plays ===
- The Baby Dance (1989)
- Looking for Normal (2001)
- Defying Gravity
- The Quality of Life (2007)
- The Escort: An Explicit Play for Discriminating People (2011)
- The Baby Dance: Mixed (2018; revised version of The Baby Dance)

Other credits

Year	Title	Role	Notes
1985–86	The Facts of Life	Program consultant	5 episodes
1986	Who's the Boss?	Program consultant	Episode "Charmed Lives"
1989	The Wonder Years	Executive story editor	7 episodes

=== Acting roles ===
Year	Title	Role	Notes
1978	The Billy Crystal Comedy Hour	Regular performer	TV series
1978	Girlfriends	Omega Receptionist	Film
1984	P.O.P.	Dana McNeil	TV film
1984	E/R	Mrs. Grettie	"Only a Nurse"
1985	The Facts of Life	Karen	"We Get Letters"

== Awards and nominations ==
- Emmy Award for writing The Positively True Adventures of the Alleged Texas Cheerleader-Murdering Mom (1993)
- Emmy Award nominations for writing and directing The Baby Dance (1998)
- Emmy Award nomination for writing Normal (2003)
- Emmy Award nomination for writing If These Walls Could Talk 2 (2000) (For episode "1961")
- Women in Film Lucy Award (2000) in recognition of excellence and innovation in a writing a creative work (If These Walls Could Talk 2) that has enhanced the perception of women through the medium of television
- Directors Guild of America Award nomination for directing Normal (2003)
- Writers Guild of America Award for Best Dramatic Series for her work on the second season of Mad Men (2008)
- Los Angeles Drama Critics Circle Award (2008) for Outstanding World Premiere Play for writing The Quality of Life
- Two Ovation Awards (2008) for writing The Quality of Life
- Writers Guild of America Award for Best Long Form Adapted Series for writing Olive Kitteridge (2015)
- Emmy Award for writing Olive Kitteridge (2015)

== See also ==
- List of female film and television directors
- List of lesbian filmmakers
- List of LGBT-related films directed by women
