= Dave Widow =

American singer

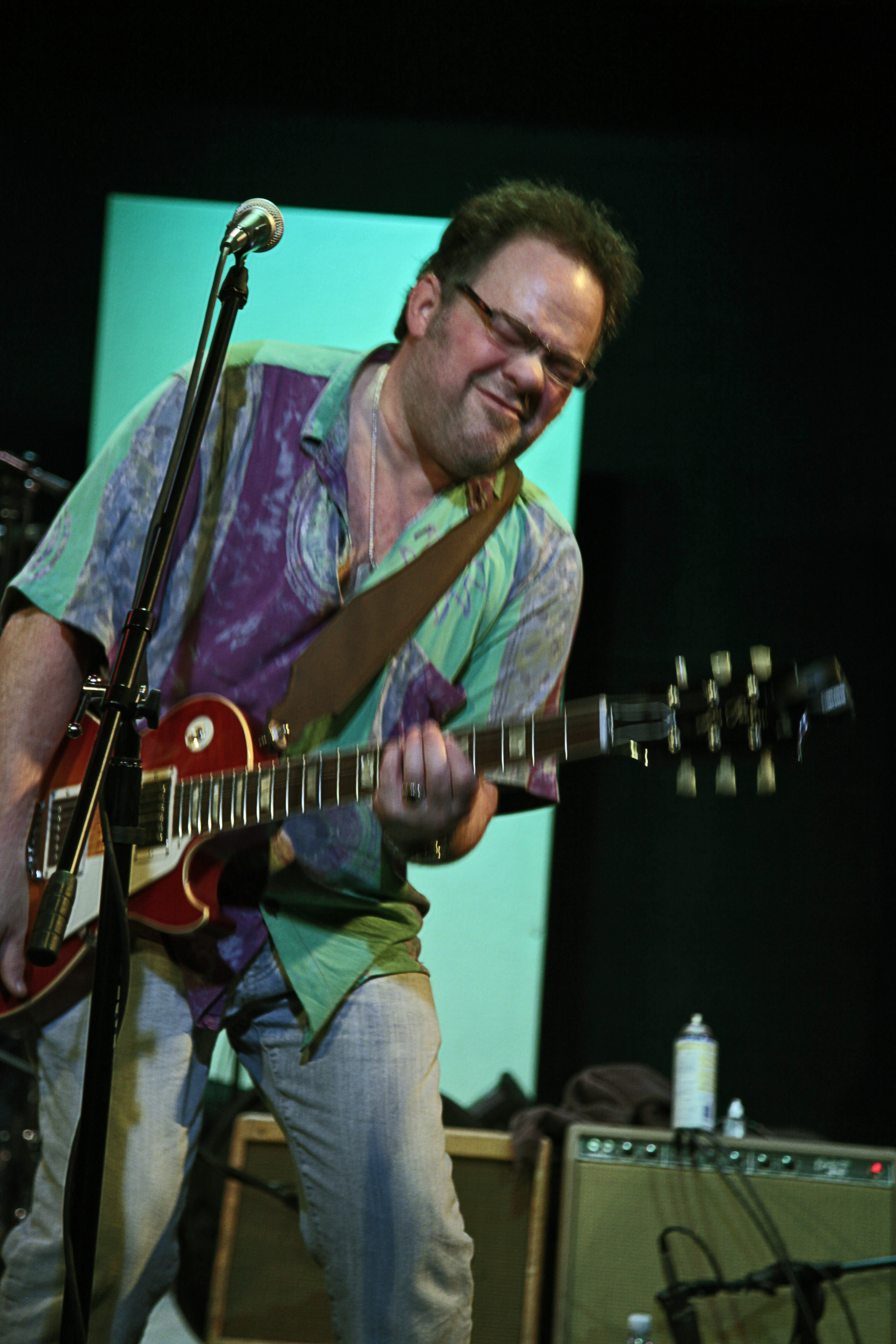
- Dave Widow in concert

Background information
- Born: Dave Widow; Cincinnati, Ohio
- Genres: Rock, blues, R&B
- Occupation: Musician
- Instruments: Vocals, guitar
- Website: davewidow.com

Dave Widow is an American singer, guitarist, and songwriter.

== Early career ==
As a child, Widow grew up in Cincinnati, Ohio. He began playing guitar at nine years old and began performing professionally at age thirteen. He later joined a bar band called the Meltones.

Widow moved to Los Angeles in 1988.

== Career ==
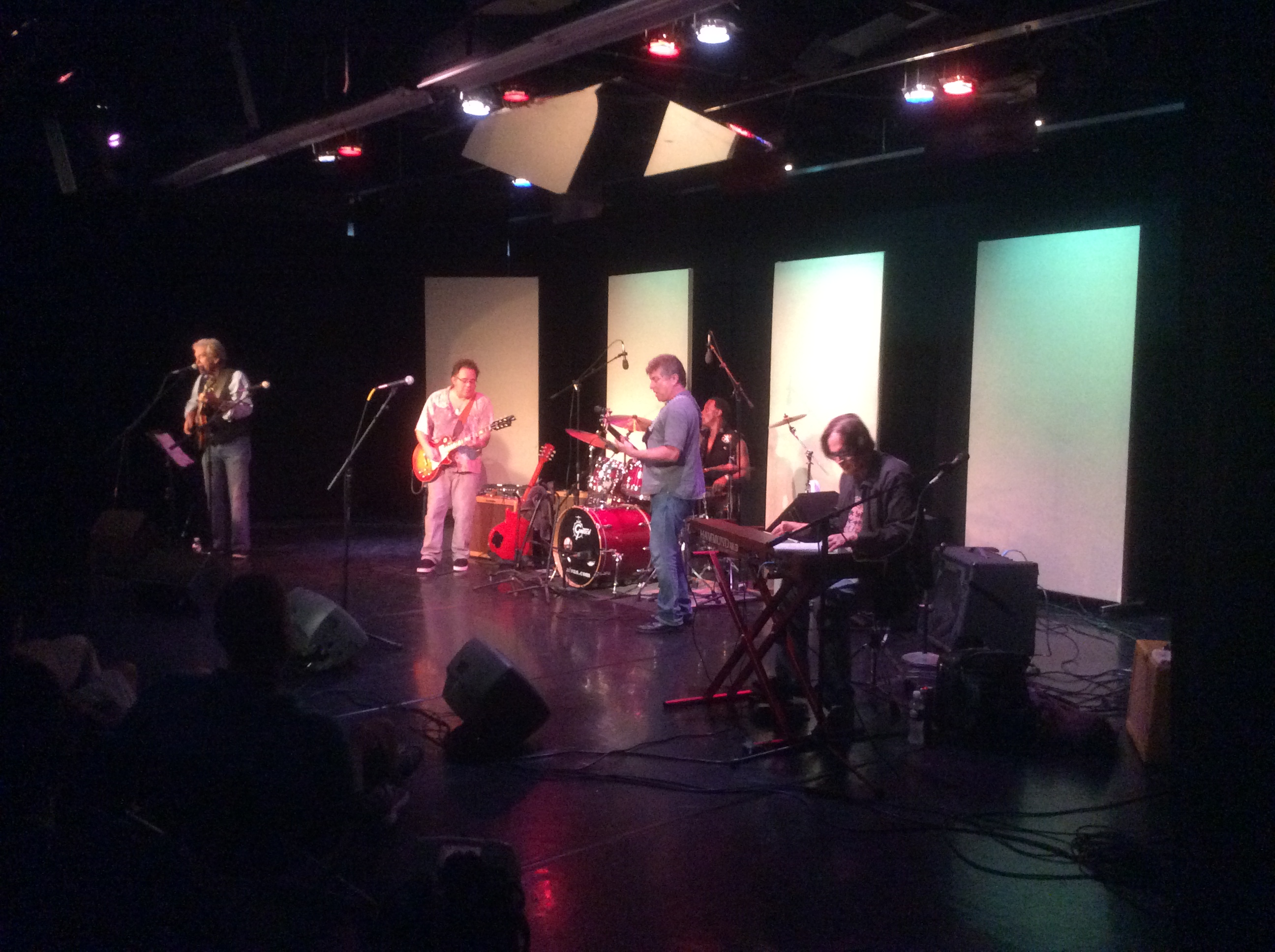
Dave Widow and the Lineup, an ever-changing group which here includes (left to right) Bill Champlin, Widow, Joe Puerta, Alvin Taylor, and Chris North.

Widow has performed with his band, Dave Widow and the Lineup at numerous venues in Southern California including the House of Blues, and continues to play live shows throughout the United States and internationally.

Dave Widow, teaches guitar apprentices at a workshop called Down to the Crossroads. The workshop at the Shack Up Inn was founded in the heart of the Mississippi Delta to help blues guitarists attain a deeper connection with the form, characterized by specific chord progressions. Widow serves as one of three coaches mentoring students to expand their technical abilities.

=== Albums ===
The latest album release by Widow, 2012's Waiting for the World to End includes supporting appearances by Bill Champlin, Mike Finnigan, Barry Goldberg, Reggie McBride and James Gadson. Widow also released an album in 2002, Got it Covered.

== Personal life ==
As of 1988, Widow has resided in Los Angeles.

== Discography ==
- 2012 Waiting for the World to End
- 2002 Got it Covered
- 1999 (Marty Grebb) Smooth Sailing
