= Willis Burks II =

American actor

- Born: October 25, 1935; Birmingham, Alabama, United States
- Died: November 21, 2010 (aged 75); Los Angeles, California, United States
- Occupation: Actor

Willis Burks II (October 25, 1935 – November 21, 2010), sometimes credited as Willis Burks or Willis Burks Jr., was an American television, film, stage and voice actor whose acting career spanned more than thirty years.

== Biography ==
Burks was born in Birmingham, Alabama, on October 25, 1935. He served in the United States Air Force before pursuing a professional acting career. Burks lived in both Chicago and New York City before settling in Los Angeles, where he resided until his death in 2010.

Burks' awards included the AUDELCO for best actor in the theatrical production of Saint Lucy's Eyes. Additionally, Burks' performance in the August Wilson play, Jitney, won him several awards, including a Drama Desk Award, an Obie Award and a second AUDELCO award.

Burks' movie roles included the 2007 film, King of California, in which he co-starred as Pepper opposite Michael Douglas and Evan Rachel Wood. Other notable roles included Sunday in 1997 and Everything's Jake in 2007, opposite Ernie Hudson and Phyllis Diller. His acting credits also included roles in video games, including The Chronicles of Riddick: Escape from Butcher Bay.

Willis Burks II died on November 21, 2010, at the age of 75. His memorial service was held at the Greater New Macedonia Ministries in Birmingham, Alabama on December 4, 2010. He was survived by four children.
