= King of California =

2007 film by Mike Cahill

- Theatrical release poster
- Directed by: Mike Cahill
- Written by: Mike Cahill
- Produced by: Michael London; Alexander Payne; Avi Lerner; Randall Emmett
- Starring: Michael Douglas; Evan Rachel Wood; Willis Burks II
- Cinematography: Jim Whitaker
- Edited by: Glenn Garland
- Music by: David Robbins
- Production companies: Nu Image Films; Millennium Films; Emmett/Furla Films
- Distributed by: First Look Studios
- Release date: September 14, 2007
- Running time: 96 minutes
- Country: United States
- Languages: English; Spanish
- Budget: $10 million
- Box office: $1 million

King of California is a 2007 American comedy-drama film written and directed by Mike Cahill. It premiered on January 24, 2007, at the Sundance Film Festival and opened in limited release in North America on September 14, 2007. It stars Michael Douglas as a mentally ill man who thinks he has discovered a buried treasure, and Evan Rachel Wood as his weary daughter.

== Plot ==
16-year-old Miranda has been abandoned by her mother, and has dropped out of school. She supports herself working at McDonald's while her father, Charlie, is in a mental institution.

When Charlie is released, Miranda finds the relatively peaceful existence she's built for herself disrupted. Charlie is supposed to have recovered, but he rambles on with strange theories. For example, he tells her that naked Chinese men are swimming ashore so they can live in California. He is also obsessed with the idea that the long-lost treasure of Spanish explorer Father Juan Florismarte Torres is buried near their suburban California house in the Santa Clarita Valley. Armed with a metal detector and a stack of treasure-hunting books, he finds reason to believe that the gold is underneath the local Costco, and encourages Miranda to get a job there so they can plan a way to excavate it.

Initially skeptical, Miranda finds herself joining in Charlie's questionable antics to give him one last shot at accomplishing his dreams. She starts working at Costco and ingratiates herself with the manager and his "swingers" group, giving her a chance to steal a master key. She, Charlie, and their friend Pepper use the key to enter the Costco after hours, setting off an alarm—but Pepper quickly reprograms it to make it seem it was triggered by a propane leak. They hide inside until firefighters have come and gone, then begin drilling through the floor, where they find a smelly underground river. Charlie dons a scuba gear, dives into the river, then emerges, claims it is indeed where the treasure is buried. Meanwhile, Pepper, standing watch outside, is spotted by a police patrol. Worried that they will notice lights inside the store, he speeds off to divert them. When they catch up with him and arrest him, they find the walkie-talkie he was using to communicate with Miranda and Charlie, and deduce that a robbery is taking place at the store.

Charlie emerges from the river. He gives Miranda a tag and tells her not to lose it. When the police arrive at the Costco, Charlie is seen carrying a small, heavy chest, hiding from the police. He jumps into the river again, swims farther, and sees a bright light and swims towards it. Miranda's off-screen voice says that Charlie's body was never found, although he is seen still alive, swimming in the river.

The next day, Miranda visits Costco and finds the product the tag belongs to, a dishwasher different than the one which she had previously admired. Using a credit card Charlie obtained for her, she buys it and takes it to the beach in her old car. When she opens it, she is seen bathed in a golden glow and a slow smile spreads across her face, implying that Charlie has cached the gold inside it. Hearing a commotion on the beach, she finds naked Chinese men coming ashore.

== Cast ==
- Michael Douglas as Charlie
- Evan Rachel Wood as Miranda
- Allisyn Ashley Arm as Young Miranda
- Willis Burks II as Pepper
- Laura Kachergus as Rita
- Paul Lieber as Doug
- Kathleen Wilhoite as Kelly
- Greg Davis Jr. as Chuchu
- Angel Oquendo as Younger Cop
- Ashley Greene as McDonald's Customer
- Will Rothhaar as Security Guard
- Jason Auer as Costco Employee

== Production ==
Director-screenwriter Mike Cahill wrote a draft of the script in the mid-1980s, but wasn't pleased with it and put it away, focusing instead on writing novels. He turned down an offer to finance the film because he refused to shoot it in Albuquerque.

According to Michael Douglas, King of California was filmed in only 31 days. Cahill said Douglas became interested in the project when he was sent the script. Co-star Evan Rachel Wood said that Douglas was so funny on the shoot, he often incapacitated the cast and crew with laughter, requiring scenes to be reshot.

== Release ==
The film premiered on January 24, 2007, at the Sundance Film Festival, and was released on September 14, 2007, in the United States.

=== Box office ===
At the end of its box office run, King of California grossed $268,461 in North America and $777,325 in other territories, for a worldwide total of $1,045,786. It earned a weekend gross of $35,814 playing in 5 theaters, with a per-theatre average of $7,162 and ranking #58. Its biggest overseas markets were Italy, Germany and France, where it grossed $300,080, $143,683 and $121,140 respectively.

=== Critical response ===
On the review aggregator website Rotten Tomatoes, 62% of 66 critics' reviews are positive. The website's consensus reads: "A quirky and often touching comedy about a mature teenager and her manic depressive father, King of California is a charming tale of familial relations and treasure hunting." Metacritic, which uses a weighted average, assigned the film a score of 63 out of 100, based on 22 critics, indicating "generally favorable" reviews.

The New York Times film critic Stephen Holden described King of California as "a sequel of sorts" to One Flew Over the Cuckoo's Nest (1975), noting the similarity between the characters of Charlie and Randle McMurphy (played by Jack Nicholson). Praising Michael Douglas' acting as "his strongest screen performance since Wonder Boys," Holden concluded that the film "is really a Don Quixote-like fable about nonconformity and pursuing your impossible dream to the very end."

Ted Fry of The Seattle Times also extolled Michael Douglas' acting as "one of his stronger performances", and called King of California "a strong effort by first-time writer/director Mike Cahill that will keep you bemused for its idiosyncratic voice."

=== Home media ===
King of California was released on DVD in the U.K. in early June 2008.
