= How to Win at Checkers (Every Time) =

2015 film

- Film poster
- Directed by: Josh Kim
- Screenplay by: Josh Kim
- Based on: "At the Café Lovely" and "Draft Day" by Rattawut Lapcharoensap
- Produced by: Chris Lee; Anocha Suwichakornpong
- Starring: Toni Rakkaen; Ingkarat Damrongsakkul; Thira Chutikul; Arthur Navarat
- Cinematography: Nikorn Sripongwarakul
- Edited by: Kamontorn Eakwattanakij
- Music by: Boovar Isbjornsson
- Production companies: Hidden Rooster Films; Add Word Productions; Chris Lee Productions; Electric Eel Films
- Release date: 8 February 2015 (Berlin)
- Running time: 80 minutes
- Countries: Thailand; United States; Indonesia
- Language: Thai

How to Win at Checkers (Every Time) (Thai title: พี่ชาย My Hero) is a 2015 internationally co-produced drama film directed by Josh Kim. It was screened in the Panorama section of the 65th Berlin International Film Festival, and was selected as the Thai entry for the Best Foreign Language Film at the 88th Academy Awards, but it was not nominated. The film is based on the short stories "At the Café Lovely" and "Draft Day" by Rattawut Lapcharoensap.

== Cast ==
- Toni Rakkaen as Adult Oat
- Ingkarat Damrongsakkul as Oat
- Thira Chutikul as Ek
- Jinn Jinna Navarat as Jai
- Natarat Lakha as Kitty
- Kowit Wattanakul as Sia
- Nuntita Khampiranon as Singer
- Michael Shaowanasai as Customer
- Anawat Patanawanichkul as Junior
- Vatanya Thamdee as Auntie

== See also ==
- List of lesbian, gay, bisexual or transgender-related films of 2015
- List of submissions to the 88th Academy Awards for Best Foreign Language Film
- List of Thai submissions for the Academy Award for Best Foreign Language Film
