= Rattawut Lapcharoensap =

Thai American short story writer (born 1979)

Rattawut Lapcharoensap (Thai: รัฐวุฒิ ลาภเจริญทรัพย์; IPA:[rát.tʰà.wút lâːp.tɕà.rɤ̄ːn.sáp]; born 1979) is a Thai American short story writer. He is best known for Sightseeing, a collection of short stories published in 2005. The film How to Win at Checkers (Every Time) is based on two stories from the collection ("At the Café Lovely" and "Draft Day"). In 2006 the National Book Foundation named him a 5 under 35 honoree.

== Life ==
Lapcharoensap was born in Chicago and grew up in Bangkok. He graduated from the University of Michigan with an MFA in creative writing.

== Awards ==
- 2010 Whiting Award
- 2006 5 Under 35 Award

== Works ==
- "Valets," Granta 97: Best of Young American Novelists 2, Spring 2007 (Subscription Required)
- "The Captain," Granta 124: Travel Fiction, Summer 2013 (Subscription Required)

=== Books ===
- Sightseeing. Grove Press. 2005. ISBN 978-0-80214-234-4. A collection of seven stories:
  - "Farangs," Originally published in Granta 84: Over There, How America Sees the World, Winter 2003 (Subscription Required)
  - "At the Café Lovely," Originally published in Zoetrope: All-Story, Fall 2004
  - "Draft Day," Originally published in One Story, Issue 46, October 2004
  - "Sightseeing"
  - "Priscilla the Cambodian"
  - "Don't Let Me Die in This Place"
  - "Cockfighter"
