= Packed in a Trunk: The Lost Art of Edith Lake Wilkinson =

- Directed by: Michelle Boyaner
- Written by: Jane Anderson; Michelle Boyaner
- Cinematography: Barbara Green
- Edited by: Barbara Green
- Music by: Danielle Ate the Sandwich
- Distributed by: Wolfe Releasing
- Release date: January 2, 2015 (Palm Springs)
- Running time: 77 minutes
- Country: United States
- Language: English

Packed in a Trunk: The Lost Art of Edith Lake Wilkinson is a 2015 documentary film about American artist Edith Lake Wilkinson (August 23, 1868 – July 19, 1957), who painted in Provincetown, Massachusetts from 1914 to 1923.

One of the writers of the documentary, Jane Anderson, is Wilkinson's great-niece.

== Synopsis ==
Wilkinson had a life partner, Fannie. But her family lawyer was taking her money, and her artwork almost became lost when she was committed to an insane asylum, where she spent the last thirty years of her life. After she was sent to the institution, her artwork as well as all her other things were put in trunks and shipped to a relative in West Virginia, where they were kept in an attic for forty years.

== Screenings ==
The film was shown at the Palm Springs International Film Festival on January 2, 2015, at the Provincetown International Film Festival on June 18, 2015, and at the Frameline Film Festival on June 27, 2015. The film premiered on HBO on July 20, 2015.

== See also ==
- List of lesbian, gay, bisexual or transgender-related films of 2015
