= National Gay Flag Football League =

American LGBT flag football league

- Sport: Flag football
- Founded: 2002; 24 years ago
- Commissioner: Joel Horton
- Country: United States
- Headquarters: New York City
- Website: ngffl.org

National Gay Flag Football League (NGFFL) is a nonprofit LGBT flag football league, currently comprising 200 teams in 28 leagues in the United States and Canada.

== History ==
The NGFFL was founded by Jim Buzinski and Cyd Zeigler in 2002. Teams compete in the national championship tournament to win the Gay Bowl. The championship takes place annually over Columbus Day weekend. The first tournament was held in 2002 at Hollywood High School in Los Angeles, California. It was a two-day event with teams from San Francisco, Boston, and Los Angeles competing. LA Motion won the first Gay Bowl. In 2003, Boston hosted Gay Bowl III. The New England Patriots sent Andre Tippett to officiate the ceremonial coin toss. The DC Gay Flag Football League won the Gay Bowl in 2003 and 2004. In 2005, Chicago Freeze won the Bowl.

In 2016, the Gay Bowl was held in Washington, D.C., on the National Mall.

In 2017, the San Diego Bolts were the five-time defending champions of the tournament. In 2017, the New England Patriots sponsored the Gay Bowl XVII. Additional sponsors included several Boston teams including the Red Sox, Celtics, and the Bruins. This was the first time professional sports franchises have sponsored the Gay Bowl. Other sponsors, of the 35 total, include United Airlines, Fidelity Investments, Sheraton Hotels and UPS. The tournament took place at Progin Park in Lancaster, Massachusetts. There were three divisions in the tournament, Open A, Open B, and Women's.

In 2018, Gay Bowl XVIII took place in Denver; the tournament expanded to include an Open C Division.

In 2019, Gay Bowl XIX took place in New York City.

Gay Bowl XX was scheduled for Honolulu in 2020, but was canceled due to the COVID-19 pandemic.

Gay Bowl XXI was scheduled for Toronto in 2021, yet due to many factors including pandemic travel restrictions, the tournament was held in Tempe, Arizona. Gay Bowl XXI saw the expansion of the Women's+ and Open Divisions with a re-seeding of teams after the first two games of pool play. Ultimately, champions were crowned in Open A, Open B, Open C, Open D, Women’s+ A, and Women’s+ B.

Gay Bowl XXII took place October 6–9, 2022 at Kapiolani Park in Honolulu, Hawaii. 50 teams competed and the tournament seedings followed the format created the previous year and six champions were crowned.

Gay Bowl XXIII took place in Seattle, Washington, October 5–8, 2023 and a Women’s+ C Division was added.

Austin, Texas will host Gay Bowl XXIV from October 31 through November 3, 2024.

== Leagues/Teams ==
Currently, over 200 teams in 28 leagues in the United States and Canada are part of the NGFFL. DC Gay Flag Football League is one of the oldest members of the League. The NGFFL imposes a limit on the number of heterosexual players at twenty percent on each team's roster for the Gay Bowl. This is enforced using the honor system.

== Media coverage ==
The NGFFL was the subject of the 2015 documentary F(l)ag Football. It features several people including Wade Davis, Cyd Zeigler, and Brenton Metzler.

== See also ==
- Homosexuality in sports in the United States
