= Danielle Ate the Sandwich =

American singer-songwriter (born 1986)

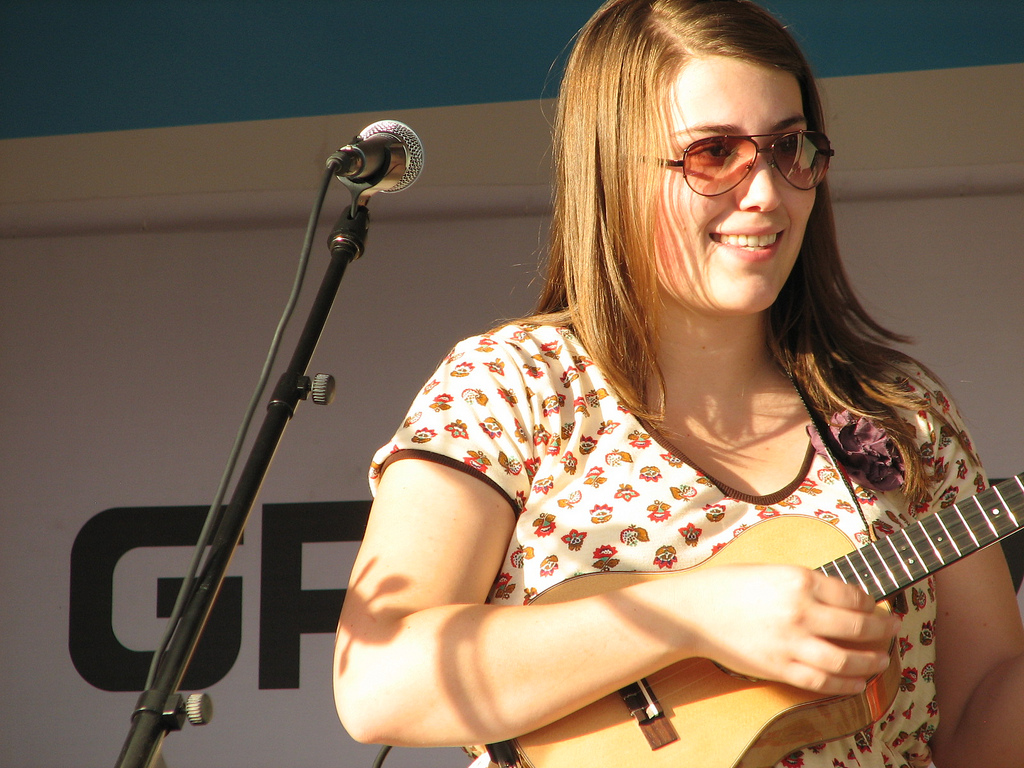
- Danielle Ate the Sandwich performing at the Denver Post Underground Music Showcase in 2010.

Background information
- Birth name: Danielle Anderson
- Born: January 24, 1986 (age 39); Grant, Nebraska
- Origin: United States
- Genres: Folk
- Occupation(s): Musician, singer-songwriter
- Instrument(s): Ukulele, guitar, violin
- Years active: 2007–present
- Website: danielleatethesandwich.com

Danielle Anderson (born January 24, 1986), known by her stage name Danielle Ate the Sandwich, is a singer-songwriter from Fort Collins, Colorado.

She has released eight independent albums, starting with her self-titled album, Danielle Ate the Sandwich, released in 2007, followed by Things People Do (2009), Two Bedroom Apartment (2010), Like a King (2012), The Drawing Back of Curtains, music from the documentary film Packed in a Trunk: The Lost Art of Edith Lake Wilkinson (2015), The Terrible Dinner Guest (2016), Live from San Francisco (2019), and Fumbling (2025).

== Early life ==
Anderson was born in Grant, Nebraska and spent her childhood in Fremont, Nebraska, later moving to Littleton, Colorado to graduate from Arapahoe High School in 2004. Born into a musical family, she learned to play the piano, the clarinet, and the saxophone in elementary school and the violin in high school. Anderson also sang in the choir and would write her own songs, but didn't start singing them publicly until college.

After high school, she studied apparel and design at Colorado State University in Fort Collins, Colorado. She graduated in 2008 and continued to live in Fort Collins until 2018.

After receiving her degree, Anderson worked as a seamstress at an alteration shop and sold handmade handbags and clothes. At that time she considered music a hobby, playing with a group of friends under the name Backdraft: the Musical. After the group parted ways, Anderson decided to go solo, creating her stage name Danielle Ate the Sandwich, posting videos of her original songs on YouTube and booking shows and tours around the country.

== Career ==
While attending college at Colorado State University in Fort Collins, Colorado, Anderson played open mic nights for over a year and began to record her first CD, which she self-recorded and produced, self-titled Danielle Ate the Sandwich.

In 2007, she began posting videos of her own songs as well as cover songs on YouTube. She played a majority of her songs with a ukulele and provided funny skits before many of her videos. Her video "Conversations with Dead People", a song from her first album, was featured on YouTube's homepage. Danielle Ate the Sandwich gained thousands of views in a few short days and hundreds of new subscribers.

In 2009, Anderson became a full-time singer-songwriter and began touring nationally.

Danielle Ate the Sandwich's 2010 album, Two Bedroom Apartment, reached #5 on the iTunes top selling singer/songwriter charts.

In October 2010, Danielle Ate the Sandwich opened for Mumford and Sons on an episode of ETown.

In 2015, Anderson composed the soundtrack to the Emmy-nominated HBO documentary, Packed in a Trunk: The Lost Art of Edith Lake Wilkinson.

Anderson is best known as a Colorado singer-songwriter and is currently based in Kansas City, Missouri.

Her primary instruments are a tenor and a baritone ukulele, both made by Mya-Moe Ukuleles.

== Discography ==
=== Albums ===
- Danielle Ate the Sandwich (2007)
- Things People Do (2009)
- Two Bedroom Apartment (2010)
- Like a King (2012)
- The Drawing Back of Curtains (2015)
- The Terrible Dinner Guest (2016)
- Live in San Francisco (2019)
- Fumbling (2025)

=== Other appearances ===
- You Be My Heart (2013)
