= F(l)ag Football =

- Official release poster
- Directed by: Seth Greenleaf
- Produced by: James Codoyannis; Seth Greenleaf; Samuel D. Pollard; Scott Yoselow
- Starring: Wade Davis; Jared Garduno; Brenton Metzler; Cyd Zeigler
- Edited by: James Codoyannis; Amanda Katz
- Music by: Christopher North
- Production company: Greenleaf Productions
- Distributed by: Abramorama
- Release date: March 30, 2015 (Phoenix Film Festival)
- Running time: 94 minutes
- Country: United States
- Language: English

F(l)ag Football is a 2015 American documentary film on the National Gay Flag Football League directed by Seth Greenleaf. It documents the training of players on the NGFFL's New York Warriors team as they prepare for the Gay Bowl. The documentary explores masculinity in sports. The documentary stars, Wade Davis, team captain of the New York Warriors, Cyd Zeigler, co-founder of the NGFFL, Brenton Metzler, and Jared Garduno.

== See also ==
- Homosexuality in modern sports
- List of LGBT-related films of 2015
