= Everything's Jake =

- Promotional poster for Everything's Jake
- Directed by: Matthew Miele
- Written by: Matthew Miele and Chris Fetchko
- Produced by: Chris Fetchko
- Starring: Ernie Hudson; Graeme Malcolm; Willis Burks; Phyllis Diller; Doug E. Doug; Stephen Furst; Robin Givens; Lou Myers (actor); Lou Rawls; Debbie Allen
- Cinematography: Anthony Jannelli
- Edited by: Noelle Webb
- Music by: Christopher North
- Distributed by: Warner Bros.
- Release date: September 25, 2000
- Running time: 93 minutes
- Country: United States
- Language: English

Everything's Jake is a 2000 drama film distributed by Warner Bros. The movie marks the feature writing and directorial debut of Matthew Miele, along with his producing/writing partner, Chris Fetchko. Aside from the film title referring to the main character, it is also a slang expression from the Roaring Twenties in the United States, meaning "everything is in good order".

== Plot ==
Within the most storied city in the world lives Jake (Ernie Hudson), a homeless man who calls all of Manhattan his home. Jake discovers Cameron (Graeme Malcolm), a man down on his luck and sleeping in a tree in Central Park.

Taking Cameron under his wing, Jake teaches him how to survive on the streets. Jake's friendship with Cameron winds up threatening Jake's way of life, a life no one ever thought could possibly exist, lived with heart and spirit, and a charming embrace of the city. In this heartwarming and beautifully-shot film, homelessness is shown in a new light, illustrated with a stellar performance by Ernie Hudson, alongside a number of star-studded cameos.

== Cast ==
- Ernie Hudson as Jake
- Graeme Malcolm as Cameron
- Willis Burks as Colonel
- Phyllis Diller as Misty
- Doug E. Doug as Taxicab Driver
- Stephen Furst as Assistant Librarian
- Robin Givens as Publisher
- Lou Myers as Abe
- Lou Rawls as Hot Dog Vendor
- Debbie Allen as Librarian

== Critical reception ==
"Ernie Hudson delivers a consummately warm and satisfying performance." — Variety

== Film festivals/awards ==
2000 Atlantic City Film Festival — Grand Prize — Full Feature
2000 Santa Barbara International Film Festival — Burning Vision Award — Special Mention
2006 Big Apple Film Festival — Festival Prize — Best Feature
