= Bizarre (film) =

2015 French drama film

- Directed by: Etienne Faure
- Written by: Etienne Faure
- Starring: Pierre Prieur
- Release date: 7 February 2015 (Berlin)
- Running time: 99 minutes
- Country: France
- Language: English

Bizarre is a 2015 French drama film directed by Etienne Faure and starring Rebekah Underhill. It was screened in the Panorama section of the 65th Berlin International Film Festival. In June and August 2015, Bizarre was screened at The Tel Aviv International LGBT Film Festival 2015.

== Cast ==
- Pierre Prieur as Maurice
- Adrian James as Luca
- Raquel Nave as Kim
- Rebekah Underhill as Betty
- Luc Bierme
- Charlie Himmelstein as Charlie
- Michael Glover
- Rita Azar

== Reception ==
The film received positive reviews.

== See also ==
- List of lesbian, gay, bisexual or transgender-related films of 2015
