= DC Gay Flag Football League =

Nonprofit football league in Washington, DC

- Sport: Flag Football
- Founded: April 23, 2009; 17 years ago
- Commissioner: Paul Whitney
- No. of teams: 24
- Country: United States
- Headquarters: Washington, D.C.
- Website: dcgffl.org

DC Gay Flag Football League (DCGFFL) is a 501(c)(3) nonprofit LGBTQ flag football league consisting of 20 teams in Washington, D.C. It is a member of Team DC, which provides a network of sporting outlets for the LGBT community of the Washington Metropolitan area, and National Gay Flag Football League.

== History ==
The DCGFFL has its roots in the 1990s when a group of gay men began to play seven versus seven pick up flag football at the National Mall on Sunday mornings. Another group that played near Dupont Circle later joined. In 1994, the league formed as an organized unit. DCGFFL incorporated on April 23, 2009. In September 2010, DCGFFL premiered in its first season as an official league. It operates under the National Gay Flag Football League and competes in the National Gay Bowl.

== Teams ==
League teams are composed of both men and women, as well as LGBT and straight players. Recent registration data shows approximately 30% of players identify as straight.

The League has also organized a recreation league comprising four to six teams. It is designed to prepare players for the main competitive teams in the DCGFFL. The League is open to people of any orientation. More recently, the number of heterosexual players joining DCGFFL has increased.

In 2010, DCGFLL had 90 players and seven teams during its first season. In 2011, DCGFLL had 200 players and 12 teams during its second season. In 2014, DCGFLL had approximately 275 players and 20 teams. In 2015, DCGFLL had approximately 270 players and 20 teams during its 10th season. In 2017, DCGFLL has more than 300 players and 22 teams during its 13th season.

== Travel teams ==
Currently, the Washington Generals, DC Admirals, DC Commanders, Delta Force, Washington Senators, and Washington Valkyries (the latter two participating in the Women's + division) are DCGFFL's all-star travel teams who compete annually at both Pride Bowl (Chicago) and Gay Bowl. In 2022, DC Space Force represented the city in Gay Bowl XXII in Hawaii. Teams composed of DCGFFL members also participate in South Florida's Flag Football League's annual Florida Sunshine Cup, including three time (2017, 2021, and 2022) champions, DC Assassins.

DCGFFL teams have won four Gay Bowls:
2019 – Gay Bowl XIX (New York City) – Washington Generals 32, LA Express Starz 27
2018 – Gay Bowl XVIII (Denver) – Washington Generals 29, San Diego Toros 13
2004 – Gay Bowl IV (Atlanta) – Washington Monuments 34, Boston Hancocks 33 (OT)
2003 – Gay Bowl III (Boston) – Washington Monuments 27, Chicago Spin 21

DCGFFL teams have placed as Runners-Up in two Gay Bowls:
2015 – Gay Bowl XV (San Diego) – San Diego Bolts 33, DC Admirals 12
2013 – Gay Bowl XIII (Phoenix) – San Diego Bolts 27, Washington Generals 26

== Community involvement ==
The League released a "Skins and Shirts" calendar in 2011 and 2016, with proceeds going to support LGBT high school athletes in the local area. Every season, DCGFFL takes a weekend off from games to host a day of service to volunteer for the local community.

The DCGFFL contributes annually to the Team DC Scholarship Fund, which supports local LGBTQ-identified student-athletes by awarding scholarships to support these impressive leaders as they continue their academic careers.

== See also ==
- Homosexuality in sports in the United States
