= Victoria Edwards =

New Zealand artist

Victoria Edwards (born 1948) is a New Zealand artist, printmaker and art educator. Her work is in the permanent collection of the Auckland Art Gallery Toi o Tāmaki.

== Life ==
Edwards was born in Auckland in 1948. She studied at the Elam School of Fine Arts, Auckland and lectured in printmaking at the school from 1978 to 1981.

In 2006 Edwards completed a PhD; her project was titled NightWatch...moving image sequences in installation 2005-2006. The following year, Edwards began a collaborative art practice with Ina Johann, and in 2016 a joint work by the pair titled On the Seam of Things - Constellations # 5 won the New Zealand Painting and Printmaking Award.
