= Matthew Miele =

American film director

- Born: New Jersey, U.S.
- Occupations: Director, screenwriter, producer, editor, author
- Years active: 2000–present
- Website: quixoticendeavors.com

Matthew Miele is an American director of both documentary and narrative films. He is best known for the documentaries Always at The Carlyle (2018), Harry Benson: Shoot First (2016) and Scatter My Ashes at Bergdorf's (2013).

== Biography ==
Miele began his career as the writer/director of Everything's Jake (2000), which starred Ernie Hudson as a homeless man. He followed this film with another original script; an ensemble piece set in a New York bistro titled Eavesdrop (2008), which starred Chris Parnell, Anna Chlumsky, Wendie Malick, Lynn Collins, and Alan Ruck, among others. To date, these are Miele's only two narrative films, with subsequent directorial projects only being that of documentaries.

These include Last Night in New York (2022), about the life of New York Social Diary's David Patrick Columbia and the social, historical and cultural domain of NYC that he has been reporting on for decades, as well as Crazy About Tiffany's (2016).

More recently, Miele released his authorized documentary about filmmaker Alan J. Pakula titled Alan Pakula: Going for Truth on Amazon Prime Video, AppleTV and Google Play. The film features Pakula collaborators such as Meryl Streep, Robert Redford, Julia Roberts, Harrison Ford, Jane Fonda, Dustin Hoffman, and Jeff Bridges.

In 2019, Miele began work on a documentary about costume designer Bob Mackie. Initially slated for release in 2020, the film was ultimately finished in 2024 and titled Bob Mackie: Naked Illusion.

Finding Satoshi, Miele's investigative documentary diving into the origins of Bitcoin and its mysterious alleged creator known as Satoshi Nakamoto, released in 2026. He has untitled documentaries about American television writer Alan Zweibel, actor Nathan Lane, and lyricist Bernie Taupin currently in production.

== Filmography ==
Year	Title	Director	Writer	Producer	Notes
Narrative films
2000	Everything's Jake	Yes	Yes	Yes	Co-written with Christopher Fetchko
2008	Eavedrop	Yes	Yes	No	
Documentary films
2010	Gentleman Gangster	Yes	Yes	Co-producer	
2013	Scatter My Ashes at Bergdorf's	Yes	Yes	No	
2016	Crazy About Tiffany's	Yes	Yes	Executive	
2016	Harry Benson: Shoot First	Yes	Yes	Executive	Co-directed and co-written with Justin Barr
2018	Always at The Carlyle	Yes	Yes	Yes	
2019	Alan Pakula: Going for Truth	Yes	No	Yes	
2021	Hooked: A Family's Journey with Addiction	Yes	No	No	
2021	Turning Tables: Cooking, Serving, and Surviving in a Global Pandemic	Yes	Yes	No	Also editor
2022	Last Night in New York	Yes	Yes	No	Also editor
2024	Bob Mackie: Naked Illusion	Yes	Yes	Executive	
2025	Paddy Chayefsky: Collector of Words	Yes	Yes	No	
2026	Finding Satoshi	Yes	Yes	No	
2026	Vincent Price: What Keeps Us Alive	Yes	Yes	No	
