= Driving Not Knowing =

- Directed by: Benjamin R. Davis; Dylan Hansen-Fliedner; Dane Mainella; Jay Jadick
- Written by: Benjamin R. Davis; Dylan Hansen-Fliedner; Dane Mainella; Jay Jadick
- Produced by: Benjamin R. Davis; Dylan Hansen-Fliedner
- Starring: Dane Mainella; Jay Jadick; Emily Rea; Bruce Spears; Alex Temme; Michael Wintermute
- Cinematography: Benjamin R. Davis; Dylan Hansen-Fliedner
- Edited by: Benjamin R. Davis; Dylan Hansen-Fliedner; Dane Mainella; Jay Jadick
- Music by: Charley Ruddell
- Release date: July 11, 2015 (Outfest)
- Running time: 86 minutes
- Language: English

Driving Not Knowing is a 2015 American semi-autobiographical musical drama film directed by Benjamin R. Davis, Dylan Hansen-Fliedner, Dane Mainella and Jay Jadick. The film received the Alternative Spirit Award, First Prize from the Rhode Island International Film Festival.

== Cast ==
- Dane Mainella as Will, a poet
- Jay Jadick as Lee, a musician
- Emily Rea as Jo, Will's friend
- Kenneth Goldsmith as Lenny
- Seth Schimmel as Noah
- Michael Wintermute as Paul
- Charley Ruddell as Chaz
- Bruce Spears as Corn, a drug dealer
- Jessup Lepkowski as Allen
- Liz Barr as Abby
- Theodore Jadick as Ted
- Debra Jadick as Debbie
- Alexa Nicolas as Mae
- Caroline Kee as Cybil
- Joe Tirella as Bouncer
- Janie Ruddell as Minor

== Production ==
The film was produced on a low budget with filming locations around rural Pennsylvania. The film has been described as "semi-autobiographical" by Mainella and Jadick because it incorporates some of their "personal storylines within interesting, fictional scenarios".

== Reception ==
Stephen Farber of The Hollywood Reporter praised the film for its cinematography saying that it makes "this rural gateway enticing" and the music for being "intermiittently engaging". However, he criticized the "thinly drawn characters". He pointed out to Brokeback Mountain, another gay film, for "how it should be done".
