= Charlie Himmelstein =

American model and photographer

Charlie Himmelstein is an American model, amateur boxer, entrepreneur, photographer, and actor. He was first recognized in 2009 in an underground boxing club called "Friday Night Throwdown." Soon after, he was hired as a model. He also is recognized as a fashion photographer. Later, he began to work as a photographer and continued to compete in boxing. His amateur boxing record is 31 victories and -1 losses. Himmelstein started acting career in 2015.

== Acting ==
- 2015. Bizarre as Charlie.
- 2015. 'Wasteland' by Nadia Bedzhanova.
