= Brenton Metzler =

American television producer

- Occupation: Television producer
- Awards: Daytime Emmy Award for Outstanding Lifestyle (2014)

Brenton Metzler is an American television producer. He won a Daytime Emmy Award for Outstanding Lifestyle as supervising producer of the HGTV show Elbow Room. He had a leading role in the documentary F(l)ag Football (2015).

== Early life and education ==
Metzler was raised in Yuma, Colorado. His father was a third-generation farmer who also worked as an investigator in the Colorado public defender's office and a mother who worked in medical records, both of whom were born and raised in Yuma, Co.. At the age of 16, Metzler moved to Fort Morgan, Colorado, where he graduated from Fort Morgan High School in 1997.

== Career ==
After graduation, he moved to California to pursue acting but later left the profession. On the recommendation of a friend, Metzler worked as an executive assistant for reality shows like Meet My Folks and Opportunity Knocks. After serving as both a field and supervising producer on shows like Elimidate, Tyra Banks Talk Show, Billy the Exterminator, Flipping Vegas, and for Networks like G4, Metzler started working as a field producer of season seven of Extreme Makeover: Home Edition. He later became a senior producer of the series. In 2015, he starred in the documentary, F(l)ag Football alongside Wade Davis, Cyd Zeigler, and Jared Garduno. Metzler was a supervising producer of Tiny House Nation in 2015. He elevated to Co-Executive Producer on Tiny House Nation before going on to be Show Runner and Executive Producer on shows like Aloha Builds for HGtv and Werrrk! for Scout Productions and MailChimp Presents. He won an Emmy as Supervising Producer for Elbow Room.

== Personal life ==
Metzler was worried about coming out as gay and originally intended on telling his family while he was in town for his 21st birthday. He later admitted that "I didn't get the nerve to tell anyone." Several years later, Metzler reported that "my sister is gay too, and we knew about each other...my parents called her and said 'We know you're gay, you can come out of the closet.' She replied: 'I'm not gay, but Brenton is.' She totally threw me out of the closet!" Metzler found that his hometown community was accepting of his orientation despite his initial apprehension.

His advice to LGBTQ youth who feel alone or isolated: "The thing you don’t realize is that there’s somebody out there who is completely going to appreciate you for you. It might not be in the town you’re in, but you’ll find those people in your life, people who are genuinely drawn to what makes you you."

== Awards ==
In 2014, Metzler won a Daytime Emmy Award for Outstanding Lifestyle as Supervising Producer of the HGTV show Elbow Room.
