= Jinna Navarat =

Thai actor

Jinn จิณณะ
- Born: Jinna Navarat จิณณะ นวรัตน์ 21 January 1993 (age 33); Thailand
- Education: Bangkok University
- Occupation: Actor
- Years active: 2015–present
- Agent: Channel 7
- Height: 185 cm (6 ft 1 in)
- Modeling information
- Hair color: black
- Eye color: black

Jinna Navarat (Thai: จิณณะ นวรัตน์), better known as Jinn Navarat, is a Thai actor.

== Filmography ==
=== Film ===
Year	Film	Character	Note	Ref.
2015	How to Win at Checkers (Every Time)	Jai		

=== Television ===
Year	TV drama	Character	Channel	Note	Ref.
2015	Angel Sword Superhero	Angel Warrior/Ultimate Boy	Channel 7	Leading role	
2015	Different World	Chatchai	Channel 7	Supporting role	
2016	Tai Rom Pra Baramee	Ahoy	Channel 7		
2016	Hurricane	Phupha	Channel 7	Leading role	
2017	Great Stone	Toon Pimpawee Kograbin	Channel 7	Leading role	
2018	Tong Fried Chicken	Professor	Channel 7	Leading role	
2018	Occupied Heart	Captain Phiphat Sivalai	Channel 7		
2018	Por Ta Bpuen Toh: Lan Ka Krai Yah Tae	Dr. Athiwat (Wat)	Channel 7	Leading role	
2020	Mungkorn Chao Phraya	Mike	Channel 7	Leading role	
2020	Mae Bia	Annop (Nop)	Channel 7	Leading role	
2022	Sao 5	Thoed Yodthong	Channel 7	Leading role	
2022	Sao Song Winyan	Chawin (Win)	Channel 7	Leading role	

=== Short drama ===
Year	Title	Character	Channel	Note	Ref.
13 February 2016	Gangsters		Channel 7		
13 September 2016	Just Breathing		Channel 7		
15 April 2017	The Black World		Channel 7		

== Accolades ==
Year	Ceremony	Awards	Nominated Work	Result	Ref.
2016	Drama Series Honor Series	—N/a	Ahoy (Tai Rom Pra Baramee)	Won	
