= Outsports =

Sports news website

- Available in: English
- Founded: 1999
- Country of origin: United States
- Owner: Q.Digital
- Founders: Cyd Zeigler, Jr. Jim Buzinski
- CEO: Scott Gatz
- Industry: LGBTQ sports issues
- Website: www.outsports.com

Outsports is an American sports news website concerned with LGBTQ issues and personalities in amateur and professional sports. The company was founded in 1999 by Cyd Zeigler, Jr. and Jim Buzinski.

The Outsports Revolution (Alyson Publications), by Zeigler and Buzinski, was released in 2007. The book chronicles the development of the Outsports.com brand and its impact on the world of gay sports, covers the gay sports movement, introduces both famous and non-famous LGBT athletes, and examines various myths and controversies regarding gays and sports.

The site received the 2003 National Lesbian and Gay Journalists Association's Excellence in New Media Journalism Award.

Outsports was purchased by Vox Media in 2013. Buzinski and Zeigler retained editorial control and continue to operate the site as part of its sports blog network SB Nation. In March 2024, amid cuts by Vox Media, the site was sold to Queerty owner Q.Digital; as part of the agreement, Buzinski and Zeigler also received equity in the company. Buzinski stated that the new ownership would help give Outsports greater prominence and provide better sponsorship opportunities.

== See also ==
- Athlete Ally
