= Edith Lake Wilkinson =

American painter

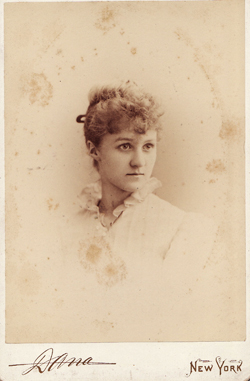
Edith Lake Wilkinson, 1889, New York City

Edith Lake Wilkinson (August 23, 1868 – July 19, 1957) was an artist who lived and painted in Provincetown, Massachusetts, during the early decades of the 20th century until she was committed to an asylum for the mentally ill in 1924. Wilkinson's life and work is highlighted in the film Packed in a Trunk: The Lost Art of Edith Lake Wilkinson.

== Early life and education ==
Wilkinson, the daughter of James P. Wilkinson and Lucy Lake Atkinson Wilkinson, was born August 23, 1868, in Wheeling, West Virginia. She moved to New York in 1888, studied at the Arts Student League of New York and earned a degree from Columbia Teacher's College in 1905.

== Later life and career as painter ==
Wilkinson spent extensive time in Provincetown from 1914 to 1923 as a member of the Provincetown Art Colony. She studied art with Charles Webster Hawthorne and Ambrose Webster, and was good friends with Blanche Lazzell. She also took up block printing, in particular a method known as the White-Line print, a technique started in 1915 by a group of artists who called themselves The Provincetown Printers. There are several white-line prints by Wilkinson that are signed and dated 1914, which pre-dates the earliest known prints by any of the others.

On February 15, 1922, Edith's elderly parents were overcome by gas fumes in their Wheeling, West Virginia home. Edith's mother died from monoxide poisoning that day while her father was taken to a hospital and died the following day. Edith inherited an estate of approximately $35,000 (worth around $500,000 today) which was administered by local Wheeling attorney George J. Rogers. Years later, Rogers would be indicted for embezzling money from a number of his clients. He eventually declared bankruptcy, left the law profession and, by 1940, was working as a salesman for a household paper products company.

While living in New York with her longtime female companion, Fannie Wilkinson of Augusta, Georgia, Edith received monthly checks from Rogers to cover her rent and daily living expenses. She had expressed an interest in moving back to Provincetown (an idea Rogers tried to discourage) and began studying French in anticipation of a possible trip to Paris.

On March 22, 1924, Edith was admitted to the Sheppard Pratt Institution, an asylum for the mentally ill in Baltimore, Maryland in what was described as a "paranoid state". She was released on October 2 that same year, her condition having sufficiently improved. However, just five months later, on February 10, 1925, she was readmitted to Sheppard & Pratt where she remained for the next ten years. All of Wilkinson's possessions, including most of her artwork, were packed into trunks and shipped to her nephew, Edward Vossler, in Wheeling.

In March 1935, Edith was transferred to Huntington State Hospital in West Virginia, still described as paranoid and now, at age 66, showing early signs of dementia. There she remained until her death on July 19, 1957. There is no evidence that she painted or did any artwork in the 30 years that she was institutionalized.

Decades later, her life and art work was featured in a documentary, Packed in a Trunk: The Lost Art of Edith Lake Wilkinson. Today her work is in the collections of The Huntington Museum of Art as well as The Provincetown Art Association and Museum.
