= Wade Davis (American football) =

American football player and writer (born 1977)

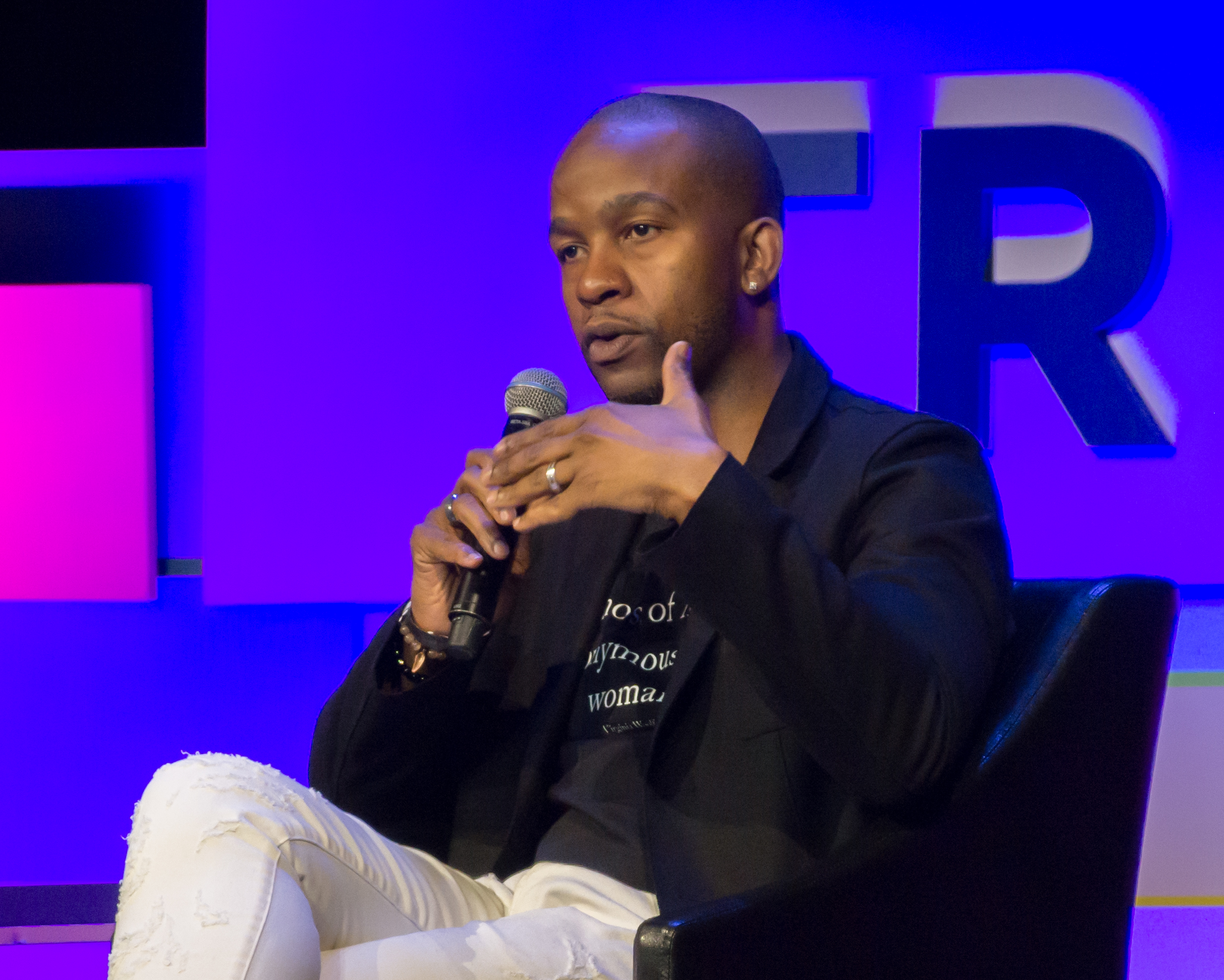
- Wade Davis speaking at the 2018 Tribeca Film Festival

No. 23, 25, 42, 36
- Position: Cornerback

Personal information
- Born: July 28, 1977 (age 49); Little Rock, Arkansas, U.S.
- Listed height: 5 ft 11 in (1.80 m)
- Listed weight: 180 lb (82 kg)

Career information
- High school: Overland (Aurora, Colorado)
- College: Colorado Mesa (1996); Weber State (1997–1999)
- NFL draft: 2000: undrafted

Career history
- Tennessee Titans (2000)*; Berlin Thunder (2001); Seattle Seahawks (2001)*; Barcelona Dragons (2002); Tennessee Titans (2002)*; Washington Redskins (2003)*
- * Offseason or practice squad member only

Awards and highlights
- World Bowl champion (IX)

Wade Alan Davis II (born July 28, 1977) is an American speaker, activist, writer, educator and former American football player.

Born in Little Rock, Arkansas, Davis grew up in Shreveport, Louisiana and Aurora, Colorado. He played college football at Mesa State and Weber State. In 2000, Davis signed with the Tennessee Titans of the NFL as an undrafted free agent but was cut after the preseason. He made his professional debut in 2001 with the NFL Europe team Berlin Thunder and won the World Bowl IX title with the Thunder. After spending the 2001 preseason with the NFL's Seattle Seahawks, Davis again played the 2002 regular season in the NFL Europe with the Barcelona Dragons. He then participated in training camps and preseasons with the Tennessee Titans in 2002 and Washington Redskins in 2003 before retiring due to injury. After leaving the NFL, Davis became the captain of National Gay Flag Football League, the New York Warriors.

In 2012, Davis came out, publicly speaking about what it was like to be closeted and gay in the NFL.

Davis is the former executive director and former director of professional sports outreach for the You Can Play project, an advocacy organization working to eradicate homophobia in professional sports. During his time at the You Can Play project, Davis developed curriculum, programming, training, and facilitated conversations focused on inclusion, equality, equity, and diversity. He formerly worked at the Hetrick-Martin Institute in New York City, New York, as the assistant director of job readiness, where he helped LGBTQ youth learn practical life skills and how to apply them.

Davis has been invited to keynote and present workshops at colleges, universities, and corporations around the globe. Davis has used his platform as an athlete to become an advocate for positive change through his workshops, keynotes, panel presentations, interviews, and writings.

== Early life and college ==
Davis was born in Little Rock, Arkansas and spent most of his childhood in Shreveport, Louisiana. He was raised in a Southern Baptist family and went to church four to five times a week. He was the only boy and the youngest child in his family. He suffered from a speech impediment and did not like to talk, which added to his feelings of loneliness. At seven years of age, Davis discovered football.

Davis later moved to Aurora, Colorado and attended Overland High School, graduating in 1996.

Davis played college football first at Mesa State College, a small college in Grand Junction, Colorado, in 1996. He transferred to Weber State University of Ogden, Utah in 1997 and played three seasons on the Weber State Wildcats football team. As a sophomore in 1997, he blocked two kicks. In 1999, his senior year, he made 11 tackles in one game for Weber State and was an honorable mention All-Big Sky Conference selection. With Weber State, Davis made 142 tackles (3 for loss), one fumble recovery, 2 forced fumbles, 20 passes defended, and 2 interceptions.

== Career ==
=== Professional football ===
At the NFL Scouting Combine of 2000, Davis ran the 40-yard dash in 4.55 seconds. The Tennessee Titans signed him as an undrafted free agent on April 18, 2000, after the 2000 NFL draft. Davis was cut after training camp.

In 2001, the Titans allocated Davis to the NFL Europe team Berlin Thunder. Starting all 10 games as left cornerback, he wore jersey number 23 and led Berlin with 57 tackles in the season and won World Bowl IX with the team. He also made 0.5 sack, 1 interception, and 5 passes defended. After the NFL Europe season, he spent the 2001 preseason in the NFL with the Seattle Seahawks.

Davis was selected in the first round of the 2002 NFL Europe allocation draft by the Barcelona Dragons. In 2002 with Barcelona, he wore jersey number 25 and made 41 tackles, 6 passes defended, and 5 special teams tackles.

Wearing jersey number 42, Davis returned to the Tennessee Titans in 2002 for training camp and preseason but was cut before the regular season. In 2003, he participated in training camp with the Washington Redskins and wore jersey #36 but retired from football due to a leg injury.

=== Activism, teaching, public speaking ===
His activism, work and story has been featured in The Washington Post, CNN, Al Jazeera America, NPR, WBUR, USA Today, Ebony Magazine, People Magazine, BET, Outsports, and Bleacher Report.

Davis has also been an adjunct professor at both the NYU School of Professional Studies Tisch Institute for Sports Management, Media, and Business and the Rutgers University School of Public Affairs and Administration.

Davis joined the advisory board for You Can Play, an organization dedicated to fighting homophobia in professional sports. On August 20, 2013, he was named executive director of the organization.

Davis co-founded, with Darnell L. Moore, the YOU Belong Initiative, an organization offering LGBTQ and straight allied youth a three-day, comprehensive sports instruction and leadership development clinic. As part of YOU Belong, Davis also began the Speaker's Collective, aimed at providing support, promotion and sense of community for LGBTQ professionals of color.

In 2014, Davis became the NFL's first diversity and inclusion consultant, where he works with the NFL and their corporate sponsors to break down the barriers that exist between the NFL and the LGBT community by leading inclusion training sessions and national engagement initiatives.

Davis created the "#ThisIsLuv" campaign alongside Darnell L. Moore, to highlight LGBTQ love in the Black community.

Davis helped launch the Ms. Foundation campaign "#MyFeminismIs" and later partnered with the Ms. Foundation and Ebony Magazine to launch the "#BlackMenAndFeminism" campaign.

=== Television ===
In 2015 Davis starred in the documentary F(l)ag Football about the National Gay Flag Football League. The following year he guest-starred on season 2 of the critically acclaimed drama American Crime in 2016. In 2019, he appeared as himself in a guest role in "Adam Ruins a Sitcom", a third-season episode of the series Adam Ruins Everything, in which he sought to raise awareness of toxic masculinity.

=== Writing ===
Davis' writing has appeared in The Huffington Post, The New York Times, Outsports, Sports Illustrated, The Advocate, Good Housekeeping, and The Guardian.

Davis' contributions are included in the book, For Colored Boys Who Have Considered Suicide When the Rainbow is Still Not Enough: Coming of Age, Coming Out, and Coming Home by Keith Boykin.

His memoir, Interference, was scheduled to be released in 2015. The memoir will chronicle his struggles growing up in a strict religious household and working and advocating for LGBTQ rights.

=== Affiliations and memberships ===
Davis was appointed to the board of GMHC.

He became a member of the Gay, Lesbian and Straight Education Network sport-advisory board in 2012.

Davis is a supporter of President Barack Obama, and worked as an LGBTQ surrogate for his 2012 reelection campaign. During the 2016 presidential election, Davis criticized Hillary Clinton for "not having real courage" and endorsed Senator Bernie Sanders.

== Awards and honors ==
- In 2014, Davis received an honorary Doctorate of Public Service from Northeastern University for his leadership and ongoing efforts to eradicate homophobia and sexism in athletics.
- Named one of the 50 Black LGBT Adults That Black LGBT Youth Should Know. 2012, National Youth Pride Services
- Named #46 on The Root 100, Black influencers and achievers, in ranked order
- Audre Lorde Founder's Award, Hispanic and Black Gay Coalition, 2012

== See also ==
- Homosexuality and bisexuality in American football
- List of LGBT writers
- List of people from Louisiana
- List of people from New York City
- List of Seattle Seahawks players
- List of Washington Redskins players
- List of Weber State University people
