= Cyd Zeigler =

American journalist

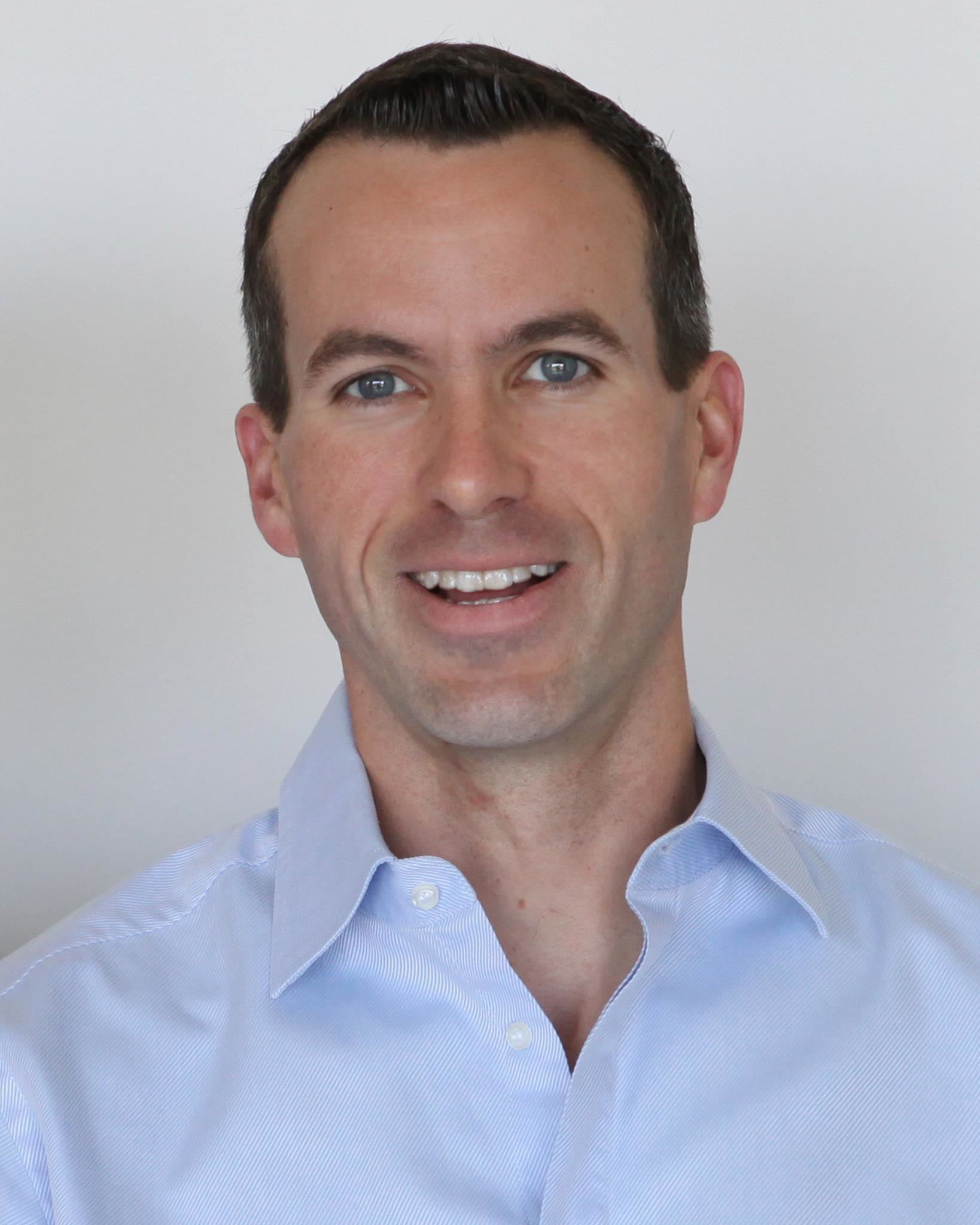
- Zeigler in 2015
- Born: Cyd Zeigler Jr. Harwich, Massachusetts, U.S.
- Education: Stanford University (BA)
- Occupations: Commentator; sports editor; author
- Known for: co-founding Outsports
- Spouse: Dan Pinar

Cyd Zeigler Jr. is a commentator and author in the field of sexuality and sports. Zeigler co-founded Outsports and the National Gay Flag Football League. He had a featured part in the documentary F(l)ag Football (2015).

== Early life and education ==
Zeigler was born in Harwich, Massachusetts, and lived there through high school. He was a track and field athlete and led his high school track team in scoring three consecutive years. Zeigler graduated from Stanford University (B.A., Communication), where he founded Theta Delta Chi fraternity, was on the Stanford Men's Ultimate (Frisbee) Team, and was a contributor to the Stanford Review newspaper.

== Career ==
He is a former sports editor for Genre Magazine, former associate editor for the New York Blade, and has written for Playboy, MSNBC, CNN, New York Press and Out Magazine. He has appeared on ESPN, Fox Sports Radio, CNN, and MSNBC as well as contributing to Sports Illustrated, Logo and The New York Times.

In 1999, Zeigler and Jim Buzinski founded Outsports. They co-authored The Outsports Revolution: Truth & Myth in the World of Gay Sports. In 2002, Buzinski and Zeigler also co-founded the National Gay Flag Football League.

Zeigler is credited with breaking the story of John Amaechi coming out of the closet in February 2007. Zeigler has also broken national stories, including the coming out of then-NFL prospect Michael Sam, transgender Div. 1 NCAA athlete Kye Allums, openly gay football players Wade Davis and Alan Gendreau, and more. Zeigler is featured in the 2015 documentary, F(l)ag Football. He was also inducted into the LGBTQ Journalists Hall of Fame by the National Lesbian and Gay Journalists Association.

== Political views ==
On March 30, 2023, Zeigler announced on Twitter that he had become a registered Republican for the first time in 20 years, stating that "progressives and Democrats seeking to use the government to attack political foes must be stopped. Period.", and that "this completely insane butchering of Democracy and our justice system cannot stand". He defended the announcement by stating that he did not like Donald Trump, but then interacted with and promoted the account of Florida governor Ron DeSantis — who was campaigning for the Republican nomination in the 2024 presidential election. LGBT publications such as The Advocate and the Washington Blade considered the implicit endorsement of DeSantis to be a "betrayal" of the LGBT community (and especially the transgender community), citing DeSantis's support of anti-LGBT policies such as the Florida Parental Rights in Education Act. Zeigler later stated that he didn't agree "with much of what the GOP and DeSantis have done in the last six months", and that he regretted the posts.

== Personal life ==
Zeigler presently lives in Los Angeles. He previously lived in New York City where he was a research editor for a global financial services firm. He was previously a development executive for Disney Channel, focusing on their movie and music franchises before leaving in 2001.

== Works ==
- Zeigler, Cyd; Buzinski, Jim (2007), The Outsports Revolution: Truth and Myth in the World of Gay Sports, Alyson, ISBN 978-1-59350-005-4
- Zeigler, Cyd (2016), Fair Play: How LGBT Athletes Are Claiming Their Rightful Place in Sports, Edge Of Sports, ISBN 978-1617754470
- O'Callaghan, Ryan; Zeigler, Cyd (2019), My Life On The Line: How the NFL Damn Near Killed Me and Ended Up Saving My Life, Edge Of Sports, ISBN 978-1617757594

== Awards and nominations ==
| Year | Award | Nominated Work | Category | Result |
|---|---|---|---|---|
| 2003 | NLGJA Excellence in Journalism Awards | Outsports | Excellence in New Media | Won |
| 2010 | GLAAD Media Awards | Former College Football Captain was Openly Gay | Digital Journalism | Nominated |
| 2011 | NLGJA Excellence in Journalism Awards | Kye Allums: First transgender man playing women's basketball | Online Journalism | 3rd place |
| 2012 | All Sports Film Festival | Thanksgiving Game | Original Feature Screenplay | Won |
| 2014 | GLAAD Media Awards | Coming Out Kicking | Digital Journalism | Nominated |
| 2015 | GLAAD Media Awards | Conner Mertens came out to his college football team | Digital Journalism | Nominated |
| 2015 | National Lesbian and Gay Journalists Association | Cyd Zeigler | Lisa Ben Award for Excellence in Features Coverage | Won |
| 2017 | GLAAD Media Awards | Former Patriots and Chiefs tackle Ryan O’Callaghan comes out as gay | Digital Journalism - Multimedia | Nominated |
| 2019 | GLAAD Media Awards | Finding the truth about transgender athletes in women’s sports | Digital Journalism - Article | Nominated |
| 2020 | National Lesbian and Gay Journalists Association | Cyd Zeigler | Hall of Fame | Won |
| 2020 | GLAAD Media Awards | Trans Athletes’ Fight for Inclusion in World Rugby | Digital Journalism - Article | Nominated |
| 2022 | GLAAD Media Awards | Summer Olympics Team LGBTQ coverage | Special Recognition | Won |
| 2025 | GLAAD Media Awards | Ballin' Out | Digital Journalism - Multimedia | Nominated |
| 2025 | Daytime Emmy Awards | Ballin' Out | Outstanding Short Form Program | Won |
