= 2019 World Rowing Championships – PR1 Women's single sculls =

PR1 Women's single sculls at the 2019 World Rowing Championships
- Venue: Linz-Ottensheim
- Location: Ottensheim, Austria
- Dates: 26 August – 1 September
- Competitors: 14 from 14 nations
- Winning time: 10:18.83

Medalists
gold medal	Birgit Skarstein	Norway
silver medal	Nathalie Benoit	France
bronze medal	Moran Samuel	Israel

The PR1 women's single sculls competition at the 2019 World Rowing Championships took place at the Linz-Ottensheim regatta venue. A top-seven finish ensured qualification for the Tokyo Paralympics.

== Schedule ==
The schedule was as follows:

Date	Time	Round
Monday 26 August 2019	10:00	Heats
Wednesday 28 August 2019	09:30	Repechage
Friday 30 August 2019	10:40	Semifinals A/B
Sunday 1 September 2019	10:35	Final C
Sunday 1 September 2019	11:18	Final B
Sunday 1 September 2019	13:05	Final A

All times are Central European Summer Time (UTC+2)

== Results ==
=== Heats ===
The three fastest boats in each heat advanced directly to the A/B semifinals. The remaining boats were sent to the repechage.

==== Heat 1 ====
Rank	Rower	Country	Time	Notes
1	Moran Samuel	Israel	10:50.50	SA/B
2	Sylvia Pille-Steppat	Germany	11:36.45	SA/B
3	Wang Lili	China	12:04.62	SA/B
4	Ebba Einarsson	Sweden	12:37.34	R
5	Sandra Khumalo	South Africa	13:27.21	R

==== Heat 2 ====
Rank	Rower	Country	Time	Notes
1	Nathalie Benoit	France	10:59.78	SA/B
2	Anna Sheremet	Ukraine	11:08.16	SA/B
3	Brenda Sardón	Argentina	11:57.81	SA/B
4	Kim Se-jeong	South Korea	12:01.57	R
5	Tomomi Ichikawa	Japan	12:56.69	R

==== Heat 3 ====
Rank	Rower	Country	Time	Notes
1	Birgit Skarstein	Norway	10:55.58	SA/B
2	Hallie Smith	United States	11:33.30	SA/B
3	Liudmila Vauchok	Belarus	11:52.57	SA/B
4	Anila Hoxha	Italy	12:12.54	R

=== Repechage ===
The three fastest boats advanced to the A/B semifinals. The remaining boats were sent to the C final.

Rank	Rower	Country	Time	Notes
1	Kim Se-jeong	South Korea	11:35.72	SA/B
2	Anila Hoxha	Italy	11:51.92	SA/B
3	Ebba Einarsson	Sweden	12:20.15	SA/B
4	Sandra Khumalo	South Africa	12:26.55	FC
5	Tomomi Ichikawa	Japan	12:27.08	FC

=== Semifinals ===
The three fastest boats in each semi advanced to the A final. The remaining boats were sent to the B final.

==== Semifinal 1 ====
Rank	Rower	Country	Time	Notes
1	Nathalie Benoit	France	10:35.65	FA
2	Moran Samuel	Israel	10:51.81	FA
3	Hallie Smith	United States	11:14.59	FA
4	Kim Se-jeong	South Korea	11:34.61	FB
5	Brenda Sardón	Argentina	12:01.28	FB
6	Ebba Einarsson	Sweden	12:31.96	FB

==== Semifinal 2 ====
Rank	Rower	Country	Time	Notes
1	Birgit Skarstein	Norway	10:32.45	FA
2	Anna Sheremet	Ukraine	10:46.96	FA
3	Sylvia Pille-Steppat	Germany	11:19.23	FA
4	Liudmila Vauchok	Belarus	11:30.77	FB
5	Wang Lili	China	11:43.97	FB
6	Anila Hoxha	Italy	11:51.17	FB

=== Finals ===
The A final determined the rankings for places 1 to 6. Additional rankings were determined in the other finals.

==== Final C ====
Rank	Rower	Country	Time
1	Sandra Khumalo	South Africa	12:25.94
2	Tomomi Ichikawa	Japan	12:29.24

==== Final B ====
Rank	Rower	Country	Time
1	Kim Se-jeong	South Korea	11:38.94
2	Liudmila Vauchok	Belarus	11:40.17
3	Brenda Sardón	Argentina	11:55.08
4	Wang Lili	China	11:55.85
5	Anila Hoxha	Italy	12:16.42
6	Ebba Einarsson	Sweden	12:42.37

==== Final A ====
Rank	Rower	Country	Time
1st place, gold medalist(s)	Birgit Skarstein	Norway	10:18.83
2nd place, silver medalist(s)	Nathalie Benoit	France	10:24.07
3rd place, bronze medalist(s)	Moran Samuel	Israel	10:30.19
4	Anna Sheremet	Ukraine	10:40.57
5	Sylvia Pille-Steppat	Germany	11:07.08
6	Hallie Smith	United States	11:12.92
