= 2023 World Rowing Championships – PR1 Women's single sculls =

PR1 Women's single sculls at the 2023 World Rowing Championships
- Venue: Lake Sava
- Location: Belgrade, Serbia
- Dates: 5 September – 10 September
- Competitors: 12 from 12 nations
- Winning time: 10:05.91

Medalists
gold medal	Birgit Skarstein	Norway
silver medal	Nathalie Benoit	France
bronze medal	Anna Sheremet	Ukraine

The PR1 women's single sculls competition at the 2023 World Rowing Championships took place at Lake Sava, in Belgrade.

== Schedule ==
The schedule was as follows:

Date	Time	Round
Tuesday 5 September 2023	10:10	Heats
Wednesday 6 September 2023	09:30	Repechages
Sunday 10 September 2023	11:06	Final B
Sunday 10 September 2023	13:20	Final A

All times are Central European Summer Time (UTC+2)

== Results ==
=== Heats ===
The best fastest boats in each heat advanced directly to the Final A. The remaining boats were sent to the repechages.

==== Heat 1 ====
Rank	Rower	Country	Time	Notes
1	Moran Samuel	Israel	9:56.42	FA
2	Nathalie Benoit	France	9:59.99	R
3	Anna Sheremet	Ukraine	10:01.79	R
4	Cláudia Santos	Brazil	11:07.16	R
5	Eva Mol	Netherlands	11:18.33	R
6	Kim Se-jeong	South Korea	11:20.75	R

==== Heat 2 ====
Rank	Rower	Country	Time	Notes
1	Birgit Skarstein	Norway	9:54.08	FA
2	Manuela Diening	Germany	7:25.90	R
3	Wang Lili	China	10:42.48	R
4	Ebba Einarsson	Sweden	11:09.98	R
5	Brenda Sardon	Argentina	11:30.07	R
6	Tomomi Ichikawa	Japan	12:59.44	R

=== Repechages ===
The two fastest boats in each heat advanced to the Final A. The remaining boats were sent to the Final B.

==== Repechage 1 ====
Rank	Rower	Country	Time	Notes
1	Nathalie Benoit	France	10:04.93	FA
2	Wang Lili	China	10:47.64	FA
3	Cláudia Santos	Brazil	11:17.26	FB
4	Kim Se-jeong	South Korea	11:21.60	FB
5	Brenda Sardon	Argentina	11:43.65	FB

==== Repechage 2 ====
Rank	Rower	Country	Time	Notes
1	Anna Sheremet	Ukraine	10:16.19	FA
2	Manuela Diening	Germany	10:36.50	FA
3	Eva Mol	Netherlands	11:32.00	FB
4	Ebba Einarsson	Sweden	11:38.03	FB
5	Tomomi Ichikawa	Japan	12:56.57	FB

=== Finals ===
The A final determined the rankings for places 1 to 6. Additional rankings were determined in the other final.

==== Final B ====
Rank	Rower	Country	Time	Total rank
1	Cláudia Santos	Brazil	11:13.49	7
2	Eva Mol	Netherlands	11:17.92	8
3	Ebba Einarsson	Sweden	11:21.07	9
4	Kim Se-jeong	South Korea	11:26.05	10
5	Brenda Sardon	Argentina	11:39.94	11
6	Tomomi Ichikawa	Japan	13:11.18	12

==== Final A ====
Rank	Rower	Country	Time
1st place, gold medalist(s)	Birgit Skarstein	Norway	10:05.91
2nd place, silver medalist(s)	Nathalie Benoit	France	10:07.70
3rd place, bronze medalist(s)	Anna Sheremet	Ukraine	10:10.31
4	Moran Samuel	Israel	10:21.75
5	Manuela Diening	Germany	10:51.58
6	Wang Lili	China	11:17.43
