= Rowing at the 2020 Summer Paralympics – Women's single sculls =

Women's single sculls at the XVI Paralympic Games
- Venue: Sea Forest Waterway
- Date: 27 – 29 August 2021
- Competitors: 12 from 12 nations

Medalists
1st place, gold medalist(s)		Birgit Skarstein	Norway
2nd place, silver medalist(s)		Moran Samuel	Israel
3rd place, bronze medalist(s)		Nathalie Benoit	France

The women's single sculls competition at the 2020 Summer Paralympics in Tokyo took place at the Sea Forest Waterway.

== Results ==
=== Heats ===
The winner of each heat qualified to the finals, the remainder went to the repechage.

==== Heat 1 ====
Rank	Lane	Rower	Nation	Time	Notes
1	6	Birgit Skarstein	Norway	11:11.00	FA
2	1	Nathalie Benoit	France	11:41.75	R
3	2	Kim Se-jeong	South Korea	12:19.02	R
4	4	Cláudia Santos	Brazil	12:28.11	R
5	3	Liudmila Vauchok	Belarus	13:26.45	R
6	6	Hallie Smith	United States	13:42.87	R

==== Heat 2 ====
Rank	Lane	Rower	Nation	Time	Notes
1	5	Anna Sheremet	Ukraine	11:39.70	FA
2	3	Sylvia Pille-Steppat	Germany	11:53.54	R
3	6	Brenda Sardón	Argentina	13:09.17	R
4	1	Asiya Mohamed Sururu	Kenya	13:45.50	R
5	2	Tomomi Ichikawa	Japan	13:50.29	R
6	4	Moran Samuel	Israel	REL	R

=== Repechages ===
The first two of each repechage qualified to the finals, the remainder went to Final B.

==== Repechage 1 ====
Rank	Lane	Rower	Nation	Time	Notes
1	3	Nathalie Benoit	France	10:56.23	FA
2	2	Cláudia Santos	Brazil	11:25.50	FA
3	4	Brenda Sardón	Argentina	12:01.15	FB
4	1	Hallie Smith	United States	12:13.12	FB
5	5	Tomomi Ichikawa	Japan	12:41.10	FB

==== Repechage 2 ====
Rank	Lane	Rower	Nation	Time	Notes
1	1	Moran Samuel	Israel	10:33.34	FA, PB
2	3	Sylvia Pille-Steppat	Germany	10:49.78	FA
3	4	Kim Se-jeong	South Korea	11:04.59	FB
4	5	Liudmila Vauchok	Belarus	12:20.24	FB
5	2	Asiya Mohamed Sururu	Kenya	13:14.26	FB

=== Finals ===
==== Final B ====
Rank	Lane	Rower	Nation	Time	Notes
7	3	Kim Se-jeong	South Korea	12:18.83	
8	4	Brenda Sardón	Argentina	13:14.45	
9	2	Liudmila Vauchok	Belarus	13:31.36	
10	5	Hallie Smith	United States	13:55.87	
11	6	Tomomi Ichikawa	Japan	14:14.59	
12	1	Asiya Mohamed Sururu	Kenya	14:27.48	

==== Final A ====
Rank	Lane	Rower	Nation	Time	Notes
1st place, gold medalist(s)	1	Birgit Skarstein	Norway	10:56.88	
2nd place, silver medalist(s)	3	Moran Samuel	Israel	11:18.39	
3rd place, bronze medalist(s)	4	Nathalie Benoit	France	11:28.44	
4	2	Anna Sheremet	Ukraine	11:48.10	
5	5	Sylvia Pille-Steppat	Germany	12:02.47	
6	6	Cláudia Santos	Brazil	12:57.80	
