= 2017 World Rowing Championships – PR1 Women's single sculls =

PR1 Women's single sculls at the 2017 World Rowing Championships
- Venue: Nathan Benderson Park
- Location: Sarasota, United States
- Dates: 26 September – 1 October
- Competitors: 9 from 9 nations
- Winning time: 11:14.17

Medalists
gold medal	Birgit Skarstein	Norway
silver medal	Moran Samuel	Israel
bronze medal	Sylvia Pille-Steppart	Germany

The PR1 women's single sculls competition at the 2017 World Rowing Championships in Sarasota took place in Nathan Benderson Park.

== Schedule ==
The schedule was as follows:

Date	Time	Round
Tuesday 26 September 2017	10:00	Heats
Thursday 28 September 2017	09:00	Repechage
Sunday 1 October 2017	08:40	Final B
Sunday 1 October 2017	09:38	Final A

All times are Eastern Daylight Time (UTC-4)

== Results ==
=== Heats ===
The two fastest boats in each heat advanced directly to the A final. The remaining boats were sent to the repechage.

==== Heat 1 ====
Rank	Rower	Country	Time	Notes
1	Birgit Skarstein	Norway	11:12.86	FA, WCHB
2	Moran Samuel	Israel	11:45.53	FA
3	Anila Hoxha	Italy	12:14.00	R
4	Sandra Khumalo	South Africa	12:39.26	R
5	Krisztina Lorincz	Hungary	13:51.27	R

==== Heat 2 ====
Rank	Rower	Country	Time	Notes
1	Sylvia Pille-Steppart	Germany	11:45.72	FA
2	Hallie Smith	United States	12:10.55	FA
3	Wang Lili	China	13:21.85	R
4	Maribel Munoz	Mexico	13:58.67	R

=== Repechage ===
The two fastest boats advanced to the A final. The remaining boats were sent to the B final.

Rank	Rower	Country	Time	Notes
1	Anila Hoxha	Italy	12:22.18	FA
2	Sandra Khumalo	South Africa	12:29.59	FA
3	Krisztina Lorincz	Hungary	14:02.58	FB
4	Maribel Munoz	Mexico	14:11.04	FB
5	Wang Lili	China	REL; ~~13:07.09~~	FB

=== Finals ===
The A final determined the rankings for places 1 to 6. Additional rankings were determined in the B final.

==== Final B ====
Rank	Rower	Country	Time
1	Wang Lili	China	13:33.07
2	Krisztina Lorincz	Hungary	14:07.02
3	Maribel Munoz	Mexico	14:34.01

==== Final A ====
Rank	Rower	Country	Time
1st place, gold medalist(s)	Birgit Skarstein	Norway	11:14.17
2nd place, silver medalist(s)	Moran Samuel	Israel	11:20.81
3rd place, bronze medalist(s)	Sylvia Pille-Steppart	Germany	11:55.75
4	Anila Hoxha	Italy	12:05.69
5	Sandra Khumalo	South Africa	12:14.07
6	Hallie Smith	United States	12:50.70
