= List of LGBTQ Olympians and Paralympians =

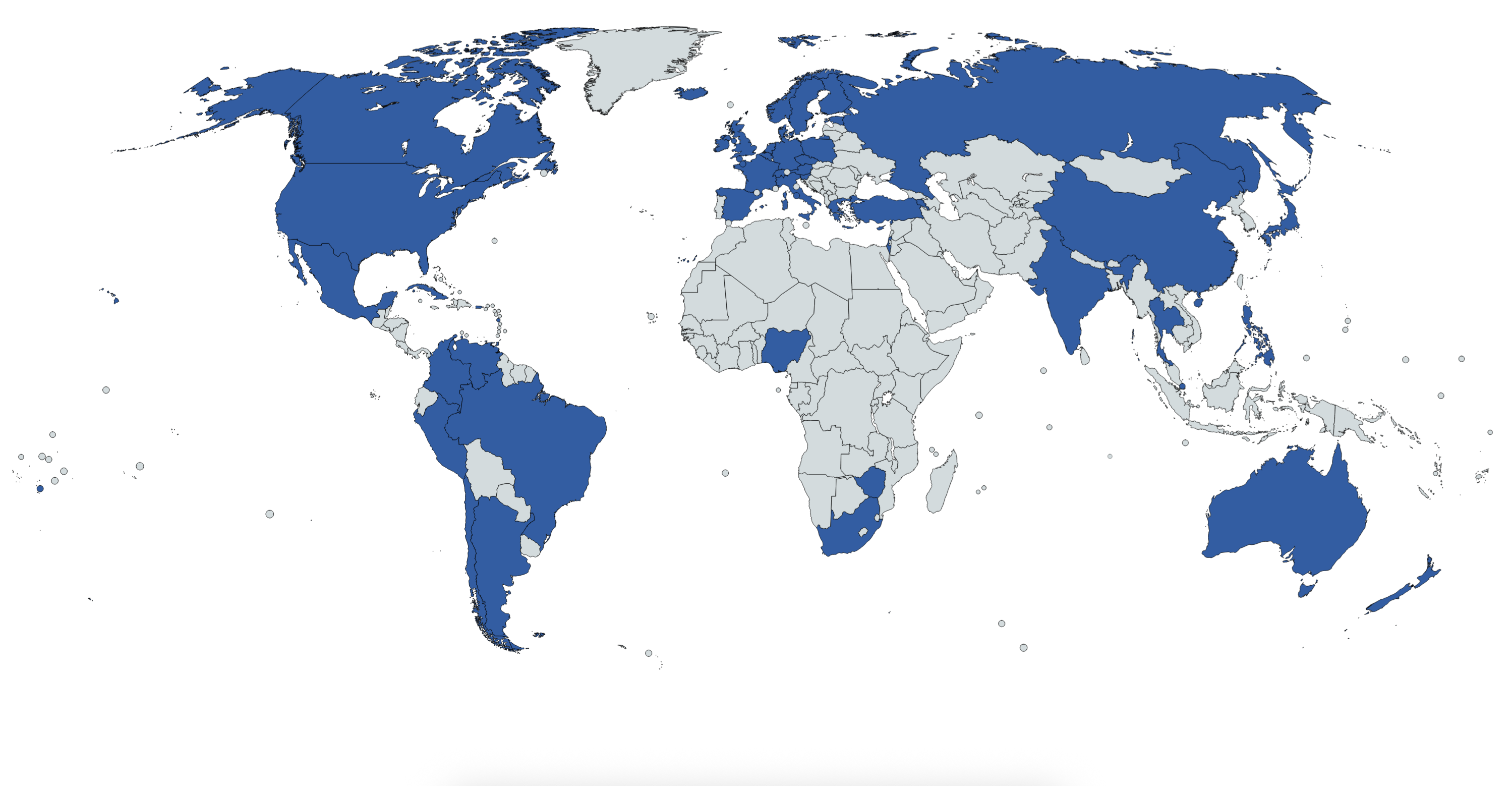
As of 2024, at least 51 nations, and the Refugee Olympic Team, have been represented by an LGBTQ+ person at the Olympics or Paralympics

There have been 922 modern Olympians and Paralympians (Note: Based on the information presented on this page) (including Summer Olympic athletes and artists, Summer Paralympians, and Winter Olympians and Paralympians) who have identified as lesbian, gay, bisexual, transgender, pansexual, non-binary, and/or queer, or who have openly been in a same-sex relationship.

The first Olympic or Paralympic Games in which an athlete now known to be LGBTQ competed was the 1900 Summer Olympics, also the first LGBTQ Para/O-lympic medalist and first contemporaneously out Para/O-lympian. (Note: Equestrian Robert de Montesquiou.) (Note: See List of LGBTQ Summer Olympians (1896–2000)) LGBTQ Para/O-lympians have contested events across over 60 sports, as well as several artistic events. The majority of LGBTQ Para/O-lympians are female. The Olympic or Paralympic sport with the most LGBTQ participants is football. The nation with the most out LGBTQ Olympians and Paralympians is the United States, including two who have also competed for other nations. (Note: Football player and coach Pia Sundhage and skier Gus Kenworthy.)

The most decorated LGBTQ Olympian and/or Paralympian is British Paralympic equestrian Lee Pearson, with 17 medals including 14 golds; (Note: Australian Paralympic swimmer Ellie Cole also has 17 medals, six of which are golds. See List of LGBTQ Paralympians) the most decorated LGBTQ Olympian is Dutch speed skater Ireen Wüst, with 13 medals including 6 golds; (Note: See List of LGBTQ Winter Olympians) the most decorated LGBTQ Summer Olympian is Australian swimmer Ian Thorpe, with 9 medals including 5 golds. LGBTQ Olympians who hold Olympic records include Wüst; (Note: See List of Olympic records in speed skating) footballers Pia Sundhage and Vivianne Miedema; (Note: Pia Sundhage holds all coaching records. Vivianne Miedema has scored the most goals of an individual player in a single Olympic Games and in a single Olympic match. See List of women's Olympic football tournament records and statistics.) rower Emma Twigg; (Note: See List of Olympic best times in rowing) and triple jumper Yulimar Rojas, who also holds the world record. (Note: See List of Olympic records in athletics and Triple jump world record progression.)

At least 422 LGBTQ Para/O-lympians are medalists (45.77% of LGBTQ Para/O-lympians), of whom 198 have at least one gold medal (21.48%). (Note: Harald Kreutzberg and Mary Wigman received medals in the competition part of the 1936 dance event. As a demonstration event, these medals are not counted.)

== Overview ==
All based on the Lists of LGBTQ+ Olympians and Paralympians

By country
Country	Number of Olympians			
Country	F	M	NB	Total
Argentina	7	1	—	8
Armenia	—	1	—	1
Australia	52 (Note: Alyson Annan has represented Australia, the Netherlands and China, and is counted for all.)	11	2	65
Austria	5 (Note: Jolanta Ogar represented both Poland and Austria, and is counted for both.)	1	—	6
Belarus	1	—	—	1
Belgium	14	3	—	17
Brazil	60 (Note: Pia Sundhage has represented Sweden, the United States, and Brazil and is counted for all.)	8	—	68
Canada	69	24	2	95
Chile	4	1	—	5
China	3	–	–	3
Colombia	5	—	—	5
Cuba	1 (Note: Yulenmis Aguilar represented both Cuba and Spain, and is counted for both.)	—	—	1
Cyprus	1	—	—	1
Czech Republic (Note: Including Czechoslovakia)	7	3	—	10
Denmark	9	3	—	12
Dominica	1	—	—	1
Estonia	1 (Note: Natalia Zabiiako represented both Estonia and the independent athletes from Russia, and is counted for both.)	—	—	1
Finland	13	1	—	14
France	23	9	—	32
Germany (Note: Including Weimar Republic, Nazi Germany, West Germany and East Germany)	48	9	—	57
Great Britain	59 (Note: Hege Riise represented both Norway and Great Britain, and is counted for both.)	23 (Note: Gus Kenworthy represented both Great Britain and the United States, and is counted for both.)	—	82
Greece	2	1	—	3
Iceland	1	1	—	2
India	1	—	—	1
Ireland (Note: Including Irish Free State)	6	3	—	9
Israel	6	—	—	6
Italy (Note: Including Kingdom of Italy and Fascist Italy)	9	3	—	12
Japan	—	1	—	1
Mexico	3	1	—	4
Netherlands	35	9	—	44
New Zealand	20	6	—	26
Nigeria	1	—	—	1
Norway	16	—	—	16
Peru	1	—	—	1
Philippines	3	1	—	4
Poland	5	2	—	7
Puerto Rico	5	1	—	6
Refugee Olympic Team	1	—	—	1
ROC (Note: Including Russia and the Olympic Athletes from Russia)	4	—	—	4
Singapore	1	—	—	1
Slovenia	1	—	—	1
South Africa (Note: Including Union of South Africa)	16	3	—	19
Spain	17	7	—	24
Sweden	37	4	—	41
Switzerland	3	1	—	4
Thailand	1	—	—	1
Tonga	—	1	—	1
Trinidad and Tobago	1	—	—	1
Turkey	2	—	—	2
United States	150	42	9	201
Venezuela	1	2	—	3
Zimbabwe	—	1	—	1

By year
Games	Number of Olympians (Note: Including multi-year appearances of the same Olympian; including Paralympics.)			
Games	F	M	NB	Total
1900 Summer	—	1	—	1
1904 Summer	—	1	—	1
1908 Summer	—	1	—	1
1912 Summer	—	3	—	3
1924 Summer	—	4	—	4
1928 Summer	5	4	—	9
1932 Summer	5	5	—	10
1936 Summer	3	3	—	6
1948 Summer	—	5	—	5
1952 Summer	1	—	—	1
1956 Winter	—	1	—	1
1956 Summer	2	—	—	2
1960 Summer	—	1	—	1
1964 Winter	—	1	—	1
1964 Summer	1	—	—	1
1968 Summer	2	3	—	5
1972 Winter	—	2	—	2
1972 Summer	1	2	—	3
1976 Winter	—	4	—	4
1976 Summer	5	3	—	8
1980 Winter	—	3	—	3
1980 Summer	1	1	—	2
1984 Winter	2	3	—	5
1984 Summer	8	4	—	12
1988 Winter	1	6	—	7
1988 Summer	8	9	—	17
1992 Winter	2	2	—	4
1992 Summer	15	10	—	25
1994 Winter	3	1	—	4
1996 Summer	44	14	—	58
1998 Winter	14	—	—	14
2000 Summer	45	25	—	70
2002 Winter	17	3	—	20
2004 Summer	53	16	—	69
2006 Winter	20	7	—	27
2008 Summer	94	13	—	107
2010 Winter	29	7	—	36
2012 Summer	136	17	—	153
2014 Winter	35	7	—	42
2016 Summer	206	37	3	246
2018 Winter	45	9	—	54
2020 Summer (Note: Took place in 2021 due to the COVID-19 pandemic.)	293	29	9	331
2022 Winter	49	14	1	64
2024 Summer	226	29	7	262
2026 Winter	51	13	—	64

By sport
Sport	Number of Olympians by gender (Note: Including multi-disciplinary Olympians)					
Sport	Female		Male		Non-binary	Total
Sport	Cisgender	Transgender	Cisgender	Transgender	Non-binary	Total
Alpine skiing & Para-alpine skiing	5	—	2	—	—	7
Archery	3	—	—	—	—	3
Athletics & Para-athletics	40	2 (Note: One competed in a men's category, the other in a women's category.)	16	2 (Note: Competed in a women's category)	4	64
Badminton	4	—	—	—	—	4
Basketball & Wheelchair basketball	65	—	—	—	1	66
Beach volleyball	8	—	—	—	—	8
Biathlon & Parabiathlon	4	—	1	—	—	5
Bobsleigh	2	—	1	—	—	3
Boxing	13	—	2	1	—	16
Canoeing and Kayaking & Paracanoe	5	1 (Note: Competed in a men's category)	—	—	—	6
Climbing	–	–	1	—	—	1
Cross-country skiing & Para cross-country skiing	6	—	1	—	—	7
Curling & Wheelchair curling	1	—	1	—	—	2
Cycling & Paracycling	26 (Note: Kate O'Brien has competed in both cycling and paracycling. She is only counted once.)	1	1	—	—	28
Diving	—	—	13	—	—	13
Equestrian & Para-equestrian	1	—	23	—	—	24
Fencing & Wheelchair fencing	6	—	1	—	—	7
Figure skating	6	—	36	—	1	43
Football	183	—	3	—	1	187
Freestyle skiing	5	—	2	1	—	8
Goalball	2	—	—	—	—	2
Golf	3	—	—	—	—	3
Gymnastics	9	—	12	—	—	21
Handball	19	—	—	—	—	19
Hockey	32	—	2	—	—	34
Ice hockey	71	—	—	—	—	71
Judo & Para Judo	17	—	1	—	—	18
Luge	—	—	1	—	—	1
Powerlifting	—	—	1	—	—	1
Rowing & Pararowing	28	—	4	—	1	33
Rugby sevens	31	—	—	1	2	34
Sailing	3	—	—	—	—	3
Shooting	5	—	—	—	—	5
Skateboarding	6	—	—	—	2	8
Skeleton	4	—	2	—	—	6
Ski jumping	1	—	1	—	—	2
Snowboarding & Para snowboard	8	—	—	—	—	8
Softball	11	—	—	—	—	11
Speed skating	10	—	2	—	—	12
Surfing	6	—	—	—	—	6
Swimming	16	—	25	—	1	42
Table tennis	1	—	—	1	—	2
Taekwondo & Parataekwondo	2	—	1	—	—	3
Tennis & Wheelchair tennis	22	—	3	—	—	25
Triathlon & Paratriathlon	5	—	2	—	—	7
Volleyball & Sitting volleyball	21	—	3	—	—	24
Water polo	4	—	1	—	—	5
Weightlifting	1	1	—	—	—	2
Wrestling	2	—	—	—	—	2

By art
Art	Number of Olympians by gender					
Art	Female		Male		Non-binary	Total
Art	Cisgender	Transgender	Cisgender	Transgender	Non-binary	Total
Epic Literature	—	—	1	—	—	1
Dance (Note: Demonstration event)	1	—	1	—	—	2
Drawings and water colours (Painting)	—	—	2	—	—	2
Graphic arts	—	—	2	—	—	2
Literature (Open)	—	—	3	—	—	3
Lyric works (Literature)	—	—	2	—	—	2
Painting	1	—	6	—	—	7
Sculpting (Open)	2	—	2	—	—	4
Statue sculpting	5	—	1	—	—	6

== LGBTQ+ Summer Olympians ==
=== A ===
- Laura Aarts
- Teresa Abelleira
- Helena Åberg
- Yenny Acuña
- Nicola Adams
- Adriana
- Francilla Agar
- Marilyn Agliotti
- Yulenmis Aguilar
- Michelle-Lee Ahye
- Holly Aitchison
- Elissa Alarie
- Nick Albiero
- Aline
- Julie Allemand
- Andressa Alves
- Laura Amaro
- Anja Andersen
- Camilla Andersen
- Emanuel Andrade
- Rebeca Andrade
- Ramsey Angela
- Filippa Angeldahl
- Nadine Angerer
- Alyson Annan
- Olivia Apps
- Geisa Arcanjo
- Bárbara Arenhart
- Judith Arndt
- Mackenzie Arnold
- Karriss Artingstall
- Anita Asante
- Maja Åström
- Amy Atwell
- Seimone Augustus
- Ana Azevedo
- Jennifer Azzi

=== B ===
- Hergie Bacyadan
- Leo Baker
- Kemisetso Baloyi
- Bárbara
- Shawnacy Barber
- Karen Bardsley
- Ona Batlle
- Sarah Baum
- Betty Baxter
- Jolyn Beer
- Alice Bellandi
- Perris Benegas
- Brittany Benn
- Hanna Bennison
- Ann-Katrin Berger
- Kajsa Bergqvist
- Emily Bessoir
- Sue Bird
- Nathalie Björn
- Carl Blasco
- Miriam Blasco
- Anastasia Blayvas
- Lucilla Boari
- Wendy Bonilla
- Tom Bosworth
- Maxim Bouchard
- Erica Bougard
- Nicole Branagh
- Sabine Braun
- Kelly Brazier
- Linda Bresonik
- Lucy Bronze
- Giorgia Bronzini
- Gayle Broughton
- Svenja Brunckhorst
- Rachele Bruni
- Kadeisha Buchanan
- Amandine Buchard
- Saskia Budgett
- Anne Buijs
- Niels Bukh
- Kris Burley
- Balian Buschbaum
- Karin Büttner-Janz
- Emilie Bydwell

=== C ===
- Linda Caicedo
- Jane Campbell
- Paula Camus
- Ally Carda
- Adriana Cardoso
- Jade Carey
- Agnete Carlsen
- Ellie Carpenter
- Marjorie Carpréaux
- Cecilia Carranza Saroli
- Borja Carrascosa
- Peter Caruth
- Sherry Cassuto
- Nina Castagna
- Rut Castillo
- Timo Cavelius
- Isadora Cerullo
- Dirkie Chamberlain
- Dutee Chand (Note: Chand is included both as an LGBTQ+ athlete and an intersex athlete.)
- Kendall Chase
- Mark Chatfield
- Darren Chiacchia
- Amanda Chidester
- Layshia Clarendon
- Dominic Clarke
- Kerron Clement
- Teal Cohen
- Cata Coll
- Aoife Cooke
- Natalie Cook
- Kahleah Copper
- Vanina Correa
- Rose Cossar
- Robert Costello
- Fiona Crackles
- Scott Cranham
- Cristiane
- Amanda Cromwell
- Larissa Crummer
- Orlando Cruz
- Ana Marcela Cunha
- Nina Cutro-Kelly

=== D ===
- Søren Dahl
- Lisa Dahlkvist
- Tom Daley
- Katy Daley-McLean
- Rachel Daly
- Eleni Daniilidou
- Ana Carolina da Silva
- Chayenne da Silva
- Izabela da Silva
- Tierna Davidson
- Debinha
- Chantal de Bruijn
- Gabriela DeBues-Stafford
- Sophie de Goede
- Anouk Dekker
- Irene de Kok
- Casey Dellacqua
- Elena Delle Donne
- Valerie Demey
- Elisa Di Francisca
- Alex Di Giorgio
- Margielyn Didal
- Babe Didrikson Zaharias
- Natalya Diehm
- Carlien Dirkse van den Heuvel
- Stefanie Dolson
- Gia Doonan
- Sara Doorsoun
- Robert Dover
- Anton Down-Jenkins
- Lauren Doyle
- Charlotte Drury
- Cathrine Dufour
- Greg Duhaime
- Céline Dumerc
- Katie Duncan
- Lin Dunn
- Imke Duplitzer
- Rayan Dutra

=== E–F ===
- Taylor Edwards
- Paola Egonu
- Emily Ehrlich
- Andri Eleftheriou
- Norman Elder
- Jill Ellis
- Rashida Ellis
- Crystal Emmanuel-Ahye
- Christiane Endler
- Charlotte Englebert
- Emma Entzminger
- Abby Erceg
- Magdalena Eriksson
- Terence Etherton
- Nicola Fairbrother
- Jennifer Falk
- Gigi Fernández
- Beatriz Ferreira
- Michelle Ferris
- Marina Fioravanti
- Nilla Fischer
- Sisca Folkertsma
- Amini Fonua
- Caitlin Foord
- Sandra Forgues
- Formiga
- Mark Foster
- Michaela Foster
- Larissa França
- Adrianna Franch
- Francielle
- Larissa Franklin
- Sharn Freier
- Lucía Fresco
- Lawrence Keith Frostad

=== G ===
- Edward Gal
- Vicky Galindo
- Carol Gattaz
- Lauriane Genest
- Regina George
- Yarden Gerbi
- Geyse
- Emily Gielnik
- Ginny Gilder
- Kirsty Gilmour
- Xantal Giné
- Paula Ginzo
- Élodie Godin
- Tomás González
- Katrina Gorry
- Jasmin Grabowski
- Maddy Grant
- Chelsea Gray
- Ellia Green
- Sarah Gregorius
- Kelly Griffin
- Brittney Griner
- Inka Grings
- Annie Guglia
- Gabriela Guimarães
- Sean Gunn
- Víctor Gutiérrez
- Astrid Guyart

=== H ===
- Peter Häggström
- Nathalie Hagman
- Alina Hagstrom
- Georgia Hall
- Gro Hammerseng
- Becky Hammon
- Louise Hansen
- Kellie Harrington
- Ashlyn Harris
- Campbell Harrison
- Jessica Harrison
- Tone Haugen
- Tiia Hautala
- Bruce Hayes
- Tobin Heath
- Nicole Heavirland
- Mathew Helm
- Lauren Hemp
- Mélanie Henique
- Isabell Herlovsen
- Jenni Hermoso
- Laurie Hernandez
- Raz Hershko
- Carl Hester
- Kelly Holmes
- Michelle Heyman
- Nikki Hiltz
- Ashley Hoffman
- Asia Hogan-Rochester
- Ursula Holl
- Laurel Hubbard
- Angela Hucles
- Karen Hultzer
- Mia Hundvin
- Maarten Hurkmans
- Lina Hurtig
- Svenja Huth
- Diego Hypólito

=== I–J ===
- Sophie Ingle
- Letícia Izidoro
- Colin Jackson
- Refiloe Jane
- Aleksandra Jarmolińska
- Patrick Jeffrey
- Caitlyn Jenner
- Daniel Jervis
- Juan Antonio Jiménez
- Marleen Jochems
- Clarke Johnstone
- Megan Jones
- Sarah Jones
- Steffi Jones
- Grace Joyce
- Jasmine Joyce

=== K ===
- Natasha Kai
- Tanya Kalivas
- Ebrar Karakurt
- Daria Kasatkina
- Nicolás Keenan
- Alev Kelter
- Camilla Kemp
- Johan Kenkhuis
- Alanna Kennedy
- Sam Kerr
- Isabel Kerschowski
- Emma Kete
- Thembi Kgatlana
- Lotte Kiærskou
- Billie Jean King
- Fran Kirby
- Sandra Kirby
- Kristi Kirshe
- Jen Kish
- Valentina Kogan
- Dominik Koll
- Daniel Kowalski
- Katarina Kowplos
- Katja Kraus
- Ali Krieger
- Michelle Kroppen
- Nathalie Kubalski
- Emma Kullberg
- Luca Kumahara

=== L ===
- Stephanie Labbé
- Alexandra Lacrabère
- Maëlle Lakrar
- Kim Lammers
- Holly Lam-Moores
- Ghislaine Landry
- Jessica Landström
- Lauren Lappin
- Inès Lardeur
- Marjorie Larney
- Marion Lay
- Stephen Laybutt
- Lauren Leal
- Rayssa Leal
- Kylie Ledbrook
- Mark Leduc
- Evy Leibfarth
- Anat Lelior
- Alice Lesgourgues
- Malin Levenstad
- Danell Leyva
- Li Ying
- Nancy Lieberman
- Silvana Lima
- Hedvig Lindahl
- Lori Lindsey
- Renate Lingor
- Ari-Pekka Liukkonen
- Chloe Logarzo
- Annalie Longo
- Lorena
- Greg Louganis
- Fritzi Löwy
- Jewell Loyd
- Sabrina Lozada-Cabbage
- Luciana
- Justin Lui
- Kaili Lukan
- Joey Lye

=== M ===
- Sofía Maccari
- Zoe MacKinnon
- Irish Magno
- Florence Maheu
- Anneli Maley
- Lauren Mansfield
- Robbie Manson
- Arthur Mariano
- Tiffani Marinho
- Gail Marquis
- Brian Marshall
- Marta
- Conchita Martínez
- Diana Matheson
- Patrícia Matieli
- Ian Matos
- Amélie Mauresmo
- Bambanani Mbane
- Marnie McBean
- Martha McCabe
- Haylie McCleney
- Angel McCoughtry
- Susan McGreivy
- Sophie McKinna
- Erin McLeod
- Inika McPherson
- Linda Medalen
- Lauren Meece
- Tayra Meléndez
- Ioannis Melissanidis
- Kim Mestdagh
- Holly Metcalf
- Kristie Mewis
- Teagan Micah
- Theresa Michalak
- Domien Michiels
- Vivianne Miedema
- Hans Peter Minderhoud
- Sandra Minnert
- Kayla Miracle
- Matthew Mitcham
- Leilani Mitchell
- Portia Modise
- Robert de Montesquiou
- Rosamaria Montibeller
- Daniela Montoya
- Robyn Moodaly
- Meikayla Moore
- Gabriela Moreschi
- Carmelina Moscato
- Ana Moser
- Sofía Mulánovich
- Nadine Müller
- Nina Müller
- Eefje Muskens

=== N–O ===
- Leigh-Ann Naidoo
- Marie-Ève Nault
- Martina Navratilova
- Erin Nayler
- Ashley Nee
- Robert Newton
- Cindy Ngamba
- Bente Nordby
- Jana Novotná
- Yared Nuguse
- Katja Nyberg
- Graeme Obree
- Kate O'Brien (Note: Kate O'Brien is included both as a Summer Olympian and a Paralympian.)
- Paul O'Brien
- Tzipora Obziler
- Jolanta Ogar
- Grace O'Hanlon
- Kelley O'Hara
- Meghan O'Leary
- Inger Pors Olsen
- Poppy Starr Olsen
- Mariona Ortiz

=== P ===
- Robert Páez
- Irene Paredes
- Candace Parker
- Kaia Parnaby
- Bruna de Paula
- Maartje Paumen
- Christinna Pedersen
- Shaina Pellington
- Otto Peltzer
- Fiona Pennie
- Carole Péon
- Carlos Peralta
- Ria Percival
- María Pérez
- Mayssa Pessoa
- Nesthy Petecio
- Babett Peter
- Beate Peters
- Alexis Peterson
- Anna Petrakova
- Mathilde Petriaux
- Pauline Peyraud-Magnin
- Mason Phelps Jr.
- Erin Phillips
- Constance Picaud
- David Pichler
- Fernanda Pinilla
- George Poage
- Nadia Podoroska
- Jillion Potter
- Kayleigh Powell
- Natalie Powell
- Christen Press
- Lauren Price
- Bev Priestman
- Peter Prijdekker
- Miriam Pritchard
- Alexia Putellas
- Emma Puvrez

=== Q–R ===
- Celia Quansah
- Quinn
- Isalys Quiñones
- Chuthamat Raksat
- Ana Patrícia Ramos
- Megan Rapinoe
- Hayley Raso
- Roberta Ratzke
- Felicitas Rauch
- Abigail Raye
- Lisa Raymond
- Alba Redondo
- Cheryl Reeve
- Mel Reid
- Sha'Carri Richardson
- Helen Richardson-Walsh
- Kate Richardson-Walsh
- Hege Riise
- Yoreli Rincón
- Hannah Roberts
- Danni Roche
- Robbie Rogers
- Craig Rogerson
- Yulimar Rojas
- Sofía Roma
- Trine Rønning
- Caitlin Rooskrantz
- Petra Rossner
- Olivier Rouyer
- Stephanie Rovetti
- Leif Rovsing
- Kamilla Rytter Juhl

=== S ===
- Alexis Sablone
- Dayshalee Salamán
- Cheryl Salisbury
- Senni Salminen
- Regina Salmons
- Victoria Sandell Svensson
- Leicy Santos
- Enrique Sarasola Jr.
- Raven Saunders
- Tessie Savelkouls
- Lotta Schelin
- Tabea Schendekehl
- Lea Schüller
- Demi Schuurs
- Alex Scott
- Jill Scott
- Lauren Scruggs
- Briana Scurry
- Caroline Seger
- Guenter Seidel
- Linda Sembrant
- Caster Semenya (Note: Semenya is included both as an LGBTQ+ athlete and an intersex athlete.)
- Reidun Seth
- Alena Sharp
- Kailen Sheridan
- Sally Shipard
- Erik Shoji
- Jackie Silva
- Rafaela Silva
- Georgia Simmerling
- Kyah Simon
- Jimmy Sjödin
- Therese Sjögran
- Katarzyna Skorupa
- Rikke Skov
- Alana Smith
- Kelly Smith
- Katsiaryna Snytsina
- Emilce Sosa
- Douglas Souza
- Laís Souza
- Sherida Spitse
- Georgia Stanway
- Guusje Steenhuis
- Marianne Steinbrecher
- Ingvild Stensland
- Helen Stephens
- Breanna Stewart
- Demi Stokes
- Casey Stoney
- Heidi Støre
- Beth Storry
- Samantha Stosur
- Jérémy Stravius
- Luke Strong
- Martina Strutz
- Rennae Stubbs
- Carla Suárez
- Erica Sullivan
- Pia Sundhage
- Annica Svensson
- Kaylin Swart
- Sheryl Swoopes
- Stacy Sykora

=== T ===
- Tainá
- Blyth Tait
- Tamires
- Melissa Tancredi
- Tarciane
- Diana Taurasi
- Penny Taylor
- Arjen Teeuwissen
- Carly Telford
- Irma Testa
- Ina-Yoko Teutenberg
- Mark Tewksbury
- Carole Thate
- Jessica Thoennes
- Alyssa Thomas
- Kris Thomas
- Lowri Thomas
- Markus Thormeyer
- Ian Thorpe
- Elise Thorsnes
- Sara Thunebro
- Sandie Toletti
- Ellen Tomek
- Lauren Torley
- Gearoid Towey
- Susannah Townsend
- Ruby Tui
- Marc Tur
- Emma Twigg

=== U–V ===
- Anissa Urtez
- Lara Vadlau
- Daniëlle van de Donk
- Stefanie van der Gragt
- Marieke van der Wal
- Shanice van de Sanden
- Sanne van Dijke
- Merel van Dongen
- Emily van Egmond
- Marleen van Iersel
- Charline Van Snick
- Alison Van Uytvanck
- Janine van Wyk
- Elke Vanhoof
- Melissa Vargas
- Júlia Vasconcelos
- Dan Veatch
- Anne Veenendaal
- Julian Venonsky
- Lena Videkull
- Sunette Viljoen
- Linda Villumsen
- Cortnee Vine
- Lisa-Marie Vizaniari
- Marianne Vos
- Martina Voss-Tecklenburg

=== W ===
- Tom Waddell
- Nick Wagman
- Kira Walkenhorst
- Ji Wallace
- Keira Walsh
- Michaela Walsh
- Sarah Walsh
- Lisa Walton
- Abby Wambach
- Jeffrey Wammes
- Frederic Wandres
- Haleigh Washington
- Ann Wauters
- Saskia Webber
- Rowie Webster
- Sami Whitcomb
- Marena Whittle
- Hannah Wilkinson
- Leah Wilkinson
- Rhian Wilkinson
- Fara Williams
- Natalie Williams
- Sharni Williams
- Leah Williamson
- Marissa Williamson Pohlman
- Lynn Wilms
- Alex Wilson
- Hayley Wilson
- Spencer Wilton
- Chris Witty (Note: Witty is included both as a Summer Olympian and a Winter Olympian.)
- Chelsea Wolfe
- Portia Woodman
- Jack Woolley
- Emma Wright
- Tyler Wright

=== X–Z ===
- Marta Xargay
- Kirsty Yallop
- Tameka Yallop
- Nico Young
- Shelina Zadorsky
- Lily Zhang
- Katarzyna Zillmann

== LGBTQ+ Winter Olympians ==
=== A–C ===
- Sanni Ahola
- Erin Ambrose
- Filippo Ambrosini
- Gillian Apps
- Chloé Aurard-Bushee
- Kévin Aymoz
- Megan Bankes
- Cayla Barnes
- Lore Baudrit
- Ashton Bell
- Ebba Berglund
- Andrew Blaser
- Brian Boitano
- Brittany Bowe
- Belle Brockhoff
- Jason Brown
- Lisa Brown-Miller
- Anastasia Bucsis
- Jeffrey Buttle
- Caitlin Cahow
- Kristen Campbell
- Alex Carpenter
- Julie Chu
- Callan Chythlook-Sifsof
- Guillaume Cizeron
- Emily Clark
- Robin Cousins
- Toller Cranston
- John Curry

=== D–J ===
- Mélodie Daoust
- Tineke den Dulk
- Nancy Drolet
- Meghan Duggan
- Lori Dupuis
- Johanna Fällman
- John Fennell
- Kali Flanagan
- Randy Gardner
- Makayla Gerken Schofield
- Lewis Gibson
- Amber Glenn
- Timothy Goebel
- Gracie Gold
- Danielle Goyette
- Mathilde Gremaud
- Joan Guetschow
- Chanda Gunn
- Kristrún Guðnadóttir
- Sanni Hakala
- Michi Halilović
- Matthew Hall
- Jayna Hefford
- Jorik Hendrickx
- Edel Therese Høiseth
- Elin Holmlöv
- Erika Holst
- Venla Hovi
- Daniela Iraschko-Stolz
- Mira Jalosuo
- Brianne Jenner
- Barbara Jezeršek
- Nina Jobst-Smith
- Lisa Johansson
- Peter Johansson
- Breezy Johnson

=== K–M ===
- Kristýna Kaltounková
- Michelle Karvinen
- Kathleen Kauth
- Anni Keisala
- Gus Kenworthy
- Amanda Kessel
- Christopher Kinney
- Stine Brun Kjeldaas
- Anna Kjellbin
- Hilary Knight
- Tim Koleto
- Ida Kuoppala
- Charline Labonté
- Geneviève Lacasse
- Aneta Lédlová
- Timothy LeDuc
- Ylva Lindberg
- Alysa Liu
- Lina Ljungblom
- Laura Lobis
- Elis Lundholm
- Cheryl Maas
- Emerance Maschmeyer
- Robert McCall
- Conor McDermott-Mostowy
- Axel Médéric
- Simona Meiler
- Sue Merz
- Kim Meylemans
- Hannah Miller
- Shannon Miller
- Eric Mitchell
- Mark Mitchell
- Sidney Morin
- Bruce Mouat

=== N–R ===
- Sandra Näslund
- Ondrej Nepela
- Emily Nix
- Nicholas Novak
- Ryan O'Meara
- Brian Orser
- Jamal Othman
- Caroline Ouellette
- Šárka Pančochová
- Gabriella Papadakis
- Anja Pärson
- Amanda Pelkey
- Klára Peslarová
- Brian Pockar
- Paul Poirier
- Marie-Philip Poulin
- Simon Proulx-Sénécal
- Eric Radford
- Emilia Ramboldt
- Jamie Lee Rattray
- Javier Raya
- Adam Rippon
- Hig Roberts
- Ronald Robertson
- Maria Rooth
- Shilo Rousseau
- Clara Rozier
- Angela Ruggiero

=== S–Z ===
- Emanuel Sandhu
- Martina Sáblíková
- Jill Saulnier
- Matthew Savoie
- Ronja Savolainen
- Shawn Sawyer
- Maddy Schaffrick
- Nicole Silveira
- Georgia Simmerling
- Blake Skjellerup
- Vibeke Skofterud
- Laura Stacey
- Carina Strobel
- Tricia Stumpf
- Elli Suoranta
- Filip Taschler
- Noora Tulus
- Sarah Vaillancourt
- Viivi Vainikka
- Sanne van Kerkhof
- Sophie Vercruyssen
- Kaitlyn Weaver
- Kerry Weiland
- Johnny Weir
- Linda Weiszewski
- Kendall Wesenberg
- Stacy Wilson
- Marieke Wijsman
- Russ Witherby
- Chris Witty
- Lara Wolf
- Ireen Wüst
- Natalia Zabiiako
- Micah Zandee-Hart
- Nikola Zdráhalová
- Laura Zimmermann

== LGBTQ+ Paralympians ==
- Jake Adicoff
- Jen Armbruster
- Josie Aslakson
- Nikki Ayers
- Tuany Barbosa Siqueira
- Monique Burkland
- Jo Butterfield
- Yuliya Chernoy
- Ellie Cole
- Hailey Danz
- Mateus de Assis Silva
- Diede de Groot
- Pauline Déroulède
- Abby Dunkin
- Katie-George Dunlevy
- Kaitlyn Eaton
- Andrea Eskau
- Jardênia Félix
- Anu Francis
- Edênia Garcia
- Megan Giglia
- Theresa Goh
- Laura Goodkind
- Hailey Griffin
- Barbara Gross
- Már Gunnarsson
- Jude Hamer
- Jackie Hamwey
- Claire Harvey
- Terry Hayes
- Querijn Hensen
- David Hill
- Allison Jones
- Bo Kramer
- Robyn Lambird
- Crystal Lane-Wright
- Louis Lawlor
- Josiane Lima
- Tara Llanes
- Robyn Love
- Trinity Lowthian
- Angela Madsen
- Alana Maldonado
- Francisca Mardones
- Débora Menezes
- Asya Miller
- Desiree Miller
- Mareike Miller
- Ness Murby
- Suzana Nahirnei
- Kate O'Brien
- Michael O'Hearn
- Laura Oftedahl
- Brenda Osnaya
- Cindy Ouellet
- Marie Patouillet
- Dimitri Pavadé
- Lee Pearson
- Patrícia Pereira
- Valentina Petrillo
- Christie Raleigh Crossley
- Mariana Ribeiro
- Jaleen Roberts
- Lucy Robinson
- Lauren Rowles
- Courtney Ryan
- Moran Samuel
- Monica Sereda
- Lucy Shuker
- Greg Slade
- Hallie Smith
- Maz Strong
- Richael Timothy
- Kevin van Ham
- Marieke Vervoort
- Alexandra Viney
- Ben Weekes
- Stephanie Wheeler
- Emma Wiggs
- Laurie Williams

== LGBTQ+ artists ==
- Delmar Banner
- Walter Battiss
- Arno Breker
- Roy De Maistre
- Thomas Eakins
- Fanie Eloff
- Beatrice Fenton
- Harriet Whitney Frishmuth
- Vincenzo Gemito
- Robert Graves
- Ludwig von Hofmann
- Winslow Homer
- Anna Hyatt Huntington
- Eleuter Iwaszkiewicz
- Mainie Jellett
- Harald Kreutzberg
- Henry de Montherlant
- Jan Parandowski
- Brenda Putnam
- Janet Scudder
- Renée Sintenis
- Carl Sprinchorn
- Milly Steger
- Ernst van Heerden
- Mary Wigman
- Ángel Zárraga

== See also ==
- LGBTQ history of the Olympic and Paralympic Games
- Sex verification and intersex athletes at the Olympic Games
- List of LGBTQ sportspeople
- Executive Order 14201 – part of measures targeting transgender athletes at LA 2028
