= 2022 World Rowing Championships – PR1 Women's single sculls =

PR1 Women's single sculls at the 2022 World Rowing Championships
- Venue: Labe aréna
- Location: Račice, Czech Republic
- Dates: 20 September – 23 September
- Competitors: 8 from 8 nations
- Winning time: 10:07.58

Medalists
gold medal	Birgit Skarstein	Norway
silver medal	Nathalie Benoit	France
bronze medal	Anna Sheremet	Ukraine

The PR1 women's single sculls competition at the 2022 World Rowing Championships took place at the Račice regatta venue.

== Schedule ==
The schedule was as follows:

Date	Time	Round
Tuesday 20 September 2022	10:00	Heats
Wednesday 21 September 2022	09:30	Repechage
Sunday 25 September 2022	12:00	Final B
Sunday 25 September 2022	13:20	Final A

All times are Central European Summer Time (UTC+2)

== Results ==
=== Heats ===
The fastest boats in each heat advanced directly to Final A. The remaining boats were sent to the repechages.

==== Heat 1 ====
Rank	Rower	Country	Time	Notes
1	Birgit Skarstein	Norway	10:16.28	FA
2	Nathalie Benoit	France	10:28.43	R
3	Moran Samuel	Israel	10:58.50	R
	Mukhayyo Abdusattarova	Uzbekistan	DNS	

==== Heat 2 ====
Rank	Rower	Country	Time	Notes
1	Anna Sheremet	Ukraine	10:16.52	FA
2	Manuela Diening	Germany	10:29.83	R
3	Cláudia Santos	Brazil	11:13.83	R
4	Brenda Sardon	Argentina	11:56.51	R

=== Repechage ===
The four fastest boats in repechage advanced to the Final A. The remaining boats were relegated.

Rank	Rower	Country	Time	Notes
1	Nathalie Benoit	France	10:26.66	FA
2	Moran Samuel	Israel	10:36.11	FA
3	Manuela Diening	Germany	10:36.37	FA
4	Cláudia Santos	Brazil	11:16.25	FA
5	Brenda Sardon	Argentina	11:57.02	

=== Finals ===
The final determined the rankings.

=== Final A ===
Rank	Rower	Country	Time	Notes
1st place, gold medalist(s)	Birgit Skarstein	Norway	10:07.58	
2nd place, silver medalist(s)	Nathalie Benoit	France	10:13.10	
3rd place, bronze medalist(s)	Anna Sheremet	Ukraine	10:17.45	
4	Manuela Diening	Germany	10:23.57	
5	Moran Samuel	Israel	10:37.07	
6	Cláudia Santos	Brazil	11:18.22	
