= Rowing at the 2012 Summer Paralympics – Women's single sculls =

Women's single sculls at the XIV Paralympic Games
- Venue: Eton Dorney
- Date: 31 August – 2 September 2012
- Competitors: 12 from 12 nations

Medalists
1st place, gold medalist(s)		Alla Lysenko	Ukraine
2nd place, silver medalist(s)		Nathalie Benoit	France
3rd place, bronze medalist(s)		Liudmila Vauchok	Belarus

The women's single sculls competition at the 2012 Summer Paralympics in London took place at Eton Dorney Lake which, for the purposes of the Games venue, is officially termed Eton Dorney.

== Results ==
=== Heats ===
The winner of each heat qualifies to the finals, remainder goes to the repeachge.

==== Heat 1 ====
Rank	Rower	Country	Time	Notes
1	Liudmila Vauchok	Belarus	5:40.21	Q
2	Cláudia Santos	Brazil	5:41.38	R
3	Joan Reid	Canada	5:43.52	R
4	Jongrye Lee	South Korea	5:45.82	R
5	Sandra Khumalo	South Africa	6:02.38	R
6	Monika Lengyel	Hungary	6:31.85	R

==== Heat 2 ====
Rank	Rower	Country	Time	Notes
1	Alla Lysenko	Ukraine	5:29.99	Q
2	Nathalie Benoit	France	5:39.15	R
3	Moran Samuel	Israel	5:45.47	R
4	Martyna Snopek	Poland	6:10.08	R
5	Filomena Franco	Portugal	6:31.10	R
6	Mari Ohtake	Japan	6:44.67	R

=== Repechages ===
First two of each repeachge qualify to the finals.

==== Repechage 1 ====
Rank	Rower	Country	Time	Notes
1	Moran Samuel	Israel	5:44.78	Q
2	Cláudia Santos	Brazil	5:45.62	Q
3	Martyna Snopek	Poland	6:13.00	Final B
4	Sandra Khumalo	South Africa	6:13.23	Final B
5	Monika Lengyel	Hungary	6:47.34	Final B

==== Repechage 2 ====
Rank	Rower	Country	Time	Notes
1	Nathalie Benoit	France	5:44.30	Q
2	Joan Reid	Canada	5:49.77	Q
3	Jongrye Lee	South Korea	5:52.74	Final B
4	Filomena Franco	Portugal	6:40.48	Final B
5	Mari Ohtake	Japan	7:02.53	Final B

=== Finals ===
==== Final A ====
Rank	Rower	Country	Time	Notes
1st place, gold medalist(s)	Alla Lysenko	Ukraine	5:35.29	
2nd place, silver medalist(s)	Nathalie Benoit	France	5:43.56	
3rd place, bronze medalist(s)	Liudmila Vauchok	Belarus	5:47.54	
4	Cláudia Santos	Brazil	5:47.86	
5	Moran Samuel	Israel	5:48.67	
6	Joan Reid	Canada	5:55.92	

==== Final B ====
Rank	Rower	Country	Time	Notes
7	Jongrye Lee	South Korea	5:57.86	
8	Sandra Khumalo	South Africa	6:18.88	
9	Martyna Snopek	Poland	6:23.65	
10	Filomena Franco	Portugal	6:48.54	
11	Mari Ohtake	Japan	6:50.67	
12	Monika Lengyel	Hungary	6:59.16	
