= Rowing at the 2016 Summer Paralympics – Women's single sculls =

Rowing event

Women's single sculls at the XV Paralympic Games
- Venue: Rodrigo de Freitas Lagoon
- Date: 9 September – 11 September 2016
- Competitors: 12 from 12 nations

Medalists
1st place, gold medalist(s)		Rachel Morris	Great Britain
2nd place, silver medalist(s)		Wang Lili	China
3rd place, bronze medalist(s)		Moran Samuel	Israel

The women's single sculls competition at the 2016 Summer Paralympics in Rio de Janeiro took place at the Rodrigo de Freitas Lagoon.

== Results ==
The winner of each heat qualify to the finals, remainder goes to the repechage.

=== Heats ===
==== Heat 1 ====
Rank	Rower	Country	Time	Notes
1	Wang Lili	China	5:21.04	Q, PB
2	Moran Samuel	Israel	5:21.36	R
3	Birgit Skarstein	Norway	5:26.07	R
4	Jacqueline Kapinowski	United States	5:48.69	R
5	Sandra Khumalo	South Africa	6:05.03	R
6	Krisztina Lőrincz	Hungary	6:56.54	R

==== Heat 2 ====
Rank	Rower	Country	Time	Notes
1	Rachel Morris	Great Britain	5:32.15	Q
2	Cláudia Santos	Brazil	5:38.62	R
3	Liudmila Vauchok	Belarus	5:44.98	R
4	Kim Se-jeong	South Korea	5:47.85	R
5	Eleonora de Paolis	Italy	5:50.99	R
6	Mariana Gallo	Argentina	7:31.44	R

=== Repechages ===
First two of each repechage qualify to the finals.

==== Repechage 1 ====
Rank	Rower	Country	Time	Notes
1	Moran Samuel	Israel	5:22.96	Q
2	Liudmila Vauchok	Belarus	5:45.38	Q
3	Jacqueline Kapinowski	United States	5:55.08	Final B
4	Eleonora de Paolis	Italy	5:58.65	Final B
5	Krisztina Lőrincz	Hungary	6:46.31	Final B

==== Repechage 2 ====
Rank	Rower	Country	Time	Notes
1	Birgit Skarstein	Norway	5:28.28	Q
2	Cláudia Santos	Brazil	5:34.50	Q
3	Kim Se-jeong	South Korea	5:47.20	Final B
4	Sandra Khumalo	South Africa	5:59.62	Final B
5	Mariana Gallo	Argentina	7:06.84	Final B

=== Finals ===
==== Final B ====
Rank	Rower	Country	Time	Notes
1	Jacqueline Kapinowski	United States	5:46.71	
2	Kim Se-jeong	South Korea	5:52.00	
3	Eleonora de Paolis	Italy	5:54.13	
4	Sandra Khumalo	South Africa	5:58.77	
5	Krisztina Lőrincz	Hungary	6:45.15	
6	Mariana Gallo	Argentina	7:13.36	

==== Final A ====
Rank	Rower	Country	Time	Notes
1st place, gold medalist(s)	Rachel Morris	Great Britain	5:13.69	PB
2nd place, silver medalist(s)	Wang Lili	China	5:16.65	
3rd place, bronze medalist(s)	Moran Samuel	Israel	5:17.46	
4	Birgit Skarstein	Norway	5:25.04	
5	Liudmila Vauchok	Belarus	5:34.16	
6	Cláudia Santos	Brazil	5:34.77	
