= Wang Lili =

Wang Lili may refer to:

- Wang Lili (rower) (born 1982), Chinese Paralympic rower
- Wang Lili (basketball) (born 1992), Chinese basketball player

== See also ==
- Lily Wang, statistician
