= 2026 World Rowing Championships – PR1 Women's single sculls =

PR1 Women's single sculls at the 2026 World Rowing Championships
- Venue: Bosbaan
- Location: Amsterdam, Netherlands
- Dates: 27–29 August
- Competitors: 10 from 10 nations
- Winning time: 9:48.91

Medalists
gold medal	Anna Sheremet	Ukraine
silver medal	Laurence Vandevyver	Belgium
bronze medal	Claire Ghiringhelli	Switzerland

The PR1 women's single sculls competition at the 2026 World Rowing Championships took place at Bosbaan, in Amsterdam.

== Schedule ==
The schedule was as follows:

Date	Time	Round
Thursday, 27 August 2026	14:05	Heats
Saturday, 29 August 2026	11:25	Final B
Saturday, 29 August 2026	12:27	Final A

All times are Central European Summer Time (UTC+2)

== Results ==
=== Heats ===
The two fastest boats in each heat and the two fastest times advanced to the Final A. Other crews to Final B.

==== Heat 1 ====
Rank	Rower	Country	Time	Notes
1	Laurence Vandevyver	Belgium	11:38.41	FA
2	Eva Mol	Netherlands	12:05.03	FA
3	Ebba Einarsson	Sweden	12:13.11	FA
4	Cláudia Santos	Brazil	12:25.59	FA
5	Magdalena Mozgala	Poland	17:20.28	FB

==== Heat 2 ====
Rank	Rower	Country	Time	Notes
1	Anna Sheremet	Ukraine	10:59.85	FA
2	Claire Ghiringhelli	Switzerland	11:59.93	FA
3	Malak Ghanem	Egypt	12:57.10	FB
4	Katia Aere	Italy	13:04.85	FB
5	Wang Lili	China	13:32.66	FB

=== Finals ===
The A final determined the rankings for places 1 to 6. Additional rankings were determined in the other finals.

==== Final B ====
Rank	Rower	Country	Time	Notes
1	Malak Ghanem	Egypt	11:15.29	7
2	Katia Aere	Italy	11:29.06	8
3	Wang Lili	China	12:11.80	9
4	Magdalena Mozgala	Poland	14:24.12	10

==== Final A ====
Rank	Rower	Country	Time	Notes
1st place, gold medalist(s)	Anna Sheremet	Ukraine	9:48.91	
2nd place, silver medalist(s)	Laurence Vandevyver	Belgium	10:17.77	
3rd place, bronze medalist(s)	Claire Ghiringhelli	Switzerland	10:39.76	
4	Eva Mol	Netherlands	10:45.98	
5	Cláudia Santos	Brazil	11:03.84	
6	Ebba Einarsson	Sweden	11:10.25	
