= Rowing at the 2024 Summer Paralympics – PR1W1x =

Women's single sculls at the XVII Paralympic Games
- Venue: Vaires-sur-Marne Nautical Stadium
- Date: 30 August – 1 September 2024
- Competitors: 12 from 12 nations
- Winning time: 10:25.40

Medalists
1st place, gold medalist(s)		Moran Samuel	Israel
2nd place, silver medalist(s)		Birgit Skarstein	Norway
3rd place, bronze medalist(s)		Nathalie Benoit	France

The women's single sculls competition at the 2024 Summer Paralympics in Paris took place at the Vaires-sur-Marne Nautical Stadium.

== Results ==
=== Heats ===
The winner of each heat qualified to the finals, the remainder went to the repechage.

==== Heat 1 ====
Rank	Lane	Rower	Nation	Time	Notes
1	6	Moran Samuel	Israel	9:58.02	FA, PB
2	3	Nathalie Benoit	France	10:19.12	R
3	4	Kim Se-jeong	South Korea	10:45.53	R
4	5	Wang Lili	China	11:09.66	R
5	1	Mukhayyo Abdusattorova	Uzbekistan	11:22.19	R
6	2	Asiya Muhammed Sururu	Kenya	12:08.84	R

==== Heat 2 ====
Rank	Lane	Rower	Nation	Time	Notes
1	4	Anna Sheremet	Ukraine	10:12.00	FA
2	1	Birgit Skarstein	Norway	10:13.55	R
3	6	Claire Ghiringhelli	Switzerland	11:05.32	R
4	3	Claudia Cicero dos Santos	Brazil	11:14.72	R
5	2	Ebba Einarsson	Sweden	11:35.91	R
6	5	Brenda Sardon	Argentina	11:48.23	R

=== Repechages ===
The first two of each heat qualified to the finals, the remainder went to Final B.

==== Repechage 1 ====
Rank	Lane	Rower	Nation	Time	Notes
1	3	Nathalie Benoit	France	10:24.82	FA
2	2	Claudia Cicero dos Santos	Brazil	10:54.61	FA
3	4	Claire Ghiringhelli	Switzerland	11:00.83	FB
4	5	Mukhayyo Abdusattorova	Uzbekistan	11:25.27	FB
5	1	Asiya Muhammed Saruru	Kenya	11:28.31	FB

==== Repechage 2 ====
Rank	Lane	Rower	Nation	Time	Notes
1	3	Birgit Skarstein	Norway	10:40.46	FA
2	4	Kim Se-jeong	South Korea	10:52.23	FA
3	2	Wang Lili	China	11:23.83	FB
4	5	Ebba Einarsson	Sweden	11:33.21	FB
5	1	Brenda Sardon	Argentina	11:46.07	FB

=== Finals ===
==== Final B ====
Rank	Lane	Rower	Nation	Time	Notes
7	3	Wang Lili	China	11:21.85	
8	4	Claire Ghiringhelli	Switzerland	11:29.01	
9	2	Ebba Einarsson	Sweden	11:45.33	
10	6	Brenda Sardon	Argentina	12:11.84	
11	5	Mukhayyo Abdusattorova	Uzbekistan	12:25.03	
12	1	Asiya Muhammed Saruru	Kenya	12:34.78	

==== Final A ====
Rank	Lane	Rower	Nation	Time	Notes
1st place, gold medalist(s)	4	Moran Samuel	Israel	10:25.40	
2nd place, silver medalist(s)	5	Birgit Skarstein	Norway	10:33.96	
3rd place, bronze medalist(s)	2	Nathalie Benoit	France	10:34.40	
4	3	Anna Sheremet	Ukraine	10:39.26	
5	1	Kim Se-jeong	South Korea	11:20.44	
6	6	Claudia Cicero dos Santos	Brazil	12:12.86	
