= 2018 World Rowing Championships – PR1 Women's single sculls =

PR1 Women's single sculls at the 2018 World Rowing Championships
- Venue: Plovdiv Regatta Venue
- Location: Plovdiv, Bulgaria
- Dates: 12–16 September
- Competitors: 8 from 8 nations
- Winning time: 10:13.63

Medalists
gold medal	Birgit Skarstein	Norway
silver medal	Moran Samuel	Israel
bronze medal	Hallie Smith	United States

The PR1 women's single sculls competition at the 2018 World Rowing Championships in Plovdiv took place at the Plovdiv Regatta Venue.

== Schedule ==
The schedule was as follows:

Date	Time	Round
Wednesday 12 September 2018	09:30	Heats
Friday 14 September 2018	14:45	Repechage
Sunday 16 September 2018	10:28	Final B
Sunday 16 September 2018	11:47	Final A

All times are Eastern European Summer Time (UTC+3)

== Results ==
=== Heats ===
Heat winners advanced directly to the A final. The remaining boats were sent to the repechage.

==== Heat 1 ====
Rank	Rowers	Country	Time	Notes
1	Moran Samuel	Israel	10:58.15	FA, WCHB
2	Hallie Smith	United States	11:12.29	R
3	Sylvia Pille-Steppat	Germany	11:25.88	R
4	Tomomi Ichikawa	Japan	12:25.55	R

==== Heat 2 ====
Rank	Rowers	Country	Time	Notes
1	Birgit Skarstein	Norway	10:26.38	FA, WCHB
2	Anila Hoxha	Italy	11:40.38	R
3	Tracy Van Asseldonk	Canada	12:10.12	R
4	Ebba Einarsson	Sweden	12:53.87	R

=== Repechage ===
The four fastest boats advanced to the A final. The remaining boats were sent to the B final.

Rank	Rowers	Country	Time	Notes
1	Sylvia Pille-Steppat	Germany	12:11.99	FA
2	Hallie Smith	United States	12:17.50	FA
3	Anila Hoxha	Italy	12:41.25	FA
4	Tracy Van Asseldonk	Canada	13:03.78	FA
5	Tomomi Ichikawa	Japan	13:30.02	FB
6	Ebba Einarsson	Sweden	13:49.26	FB

=== Finals ===
The A final determined the rankings for places 1 to 6. Additional rankings were determined in the B final.

==== Final B ====
Rank	Rowers	Country	Time
1	Tomomi Ichikawa	Japan	12:26.36
2	Ebba Einarsson	Sweden	12:30.88

==== Final A ====
Rank	Rowers	Country	Time	Notes
1st place, gold medalist(s)	Birgit Skarstein	Norway	10:13.63	WB
2nd place, silver medalist(s)	Moran Samuel	Israel	11:02.06	
3rd place, bronze medalist(s)	Hallie Smith	United States	11:17.56	
4	Sylvia Pille-Steppat	Germany	11:23.29	
5	Anila Hoxha	Italy	11:49.95	
6	Tracy Van Asseldonk	Canada	12:20.31	
