= Alla Lysenko =

Ukrainian Paralympic rower

Personal information
- Born: 31 May 1969 (age 57) Berdychiv, Zhytomyr, Ukrainian SSR

Sport
- Sport: Rowing
- Event: Single sculls
Medal record
Women's adaptive rowing
Representing Ukraine
Paralympic Games
Gold medal – first place	2012 London	ASW1x
World Championships
Gold medal – first place	2009 Poznań	ASW1x
Gold medal – first place	2011 Bled	ASW1x

Alla Lysenko (born 31 May 1969) is a Paralympic rower for Ukraine. She lost her legs due to a car accident in 1996. She has been world champion twice and at the 2012 Summer Paralympics she won a gold medal in women's arms-only (ASW1x) single sculls.
