= National Horse Show =

- Location: Originally New York, then Lexington, Kentucky, and in 2026, at Tryon International in Mill Spring, North Carolina
- Held: Annually
- Inaugurated: 1883
- Divisions: Hunters & Jumpers
- Classes: Hunters, Jumpers & Equitation
- Website: nhs.org

The National Horse Show is the oldest continually held horse show in the United States. It was founded in 1883 in New York and held there until 2002, when it moved to Florida and then to Kentucky.

The National Horse Show offers competition for hunters, equitation, and show jumpers.

== History ==
The National Horse Show (NHS) was founded in 1883 in New York City by a group of affluent sportsmen. By 1887, the National Horse Show Directory, listing directors and 920 members, formed the basis for Louis Keller's first New York Social Register. The competition was featured regularly in illustrations for Harper's Weekly and other magazines by artists such as Howard Chandler Christy and Charles Dana Gibson.

In 1909, Alfred Gwynne Vanderbilt, then president of the National Horse Show, made the show international by inviting British Cavalry officers to compete. In 1915 Eleonora Sears became the first woman to ride astride at the National Horse Show; prior to that, women rode sidesaddle. That same year, the show became an American military competition, until 1925. Competitors included Generals John J. "Black Jack" Pershing, William Billy Mitchell and George S. Patton. In 1926, the show moved to the third Madison Square Garden located on Eighth Avenue at 50th Street. Garden III would witness 40 years of National history and the show's continuing evolution.

By 1942, the National Horse Show had reached such importance that even as America entered World War II, an abbreviated show was still held. The competition moved to Madison Square Garden on 34th Street at Pennsylvania Station in 1968. It celebrated its centennial in 1983 with a Carriage Marathon for over 100 horse-drawn vehicles through Central Park and down Fifth Avenue to City Hall. In 1989, it moved to New Jersey's Meadowlands Arena. Newer, larger facilities led to an expansion of show division offerings. Pony hunters competed again, after an absence of 27 years, and new classes like celebrity cutting, lead line, and local classes for horses stabled within 100 miles were added.

In 1996, the competition returned to its century-old home at Madison Square Garden, and the famous racehorse, Cigar, with earnings of almost $10 million, had his formal retirement ceremony there. An Equine Extravaganza was held at Rockefeller Plaza in 1997, in recognition of The National Horse Show's 114th year.

In 2002, the show moved to Wellington, Florida, and managed by Mason Phelps Jr., who would later become president of the event. From 2008 to 2010 the NHS was held at the Syracuse Invitational in Syracuse, New York.

In 2011 the show moved again: the 128th National Horse Show was held in the Alltech Arena at the Kentucky Horse Park, Lexington, Kentucky, the location of the 2010 FEI World Equestrian Games.

In 2026, the 143rd Annual National Horse Show, moved from Kentucky and was held at Tryon International in Mill Spring, NC.
