= Nathalie Benoit =

French Paralympic rower

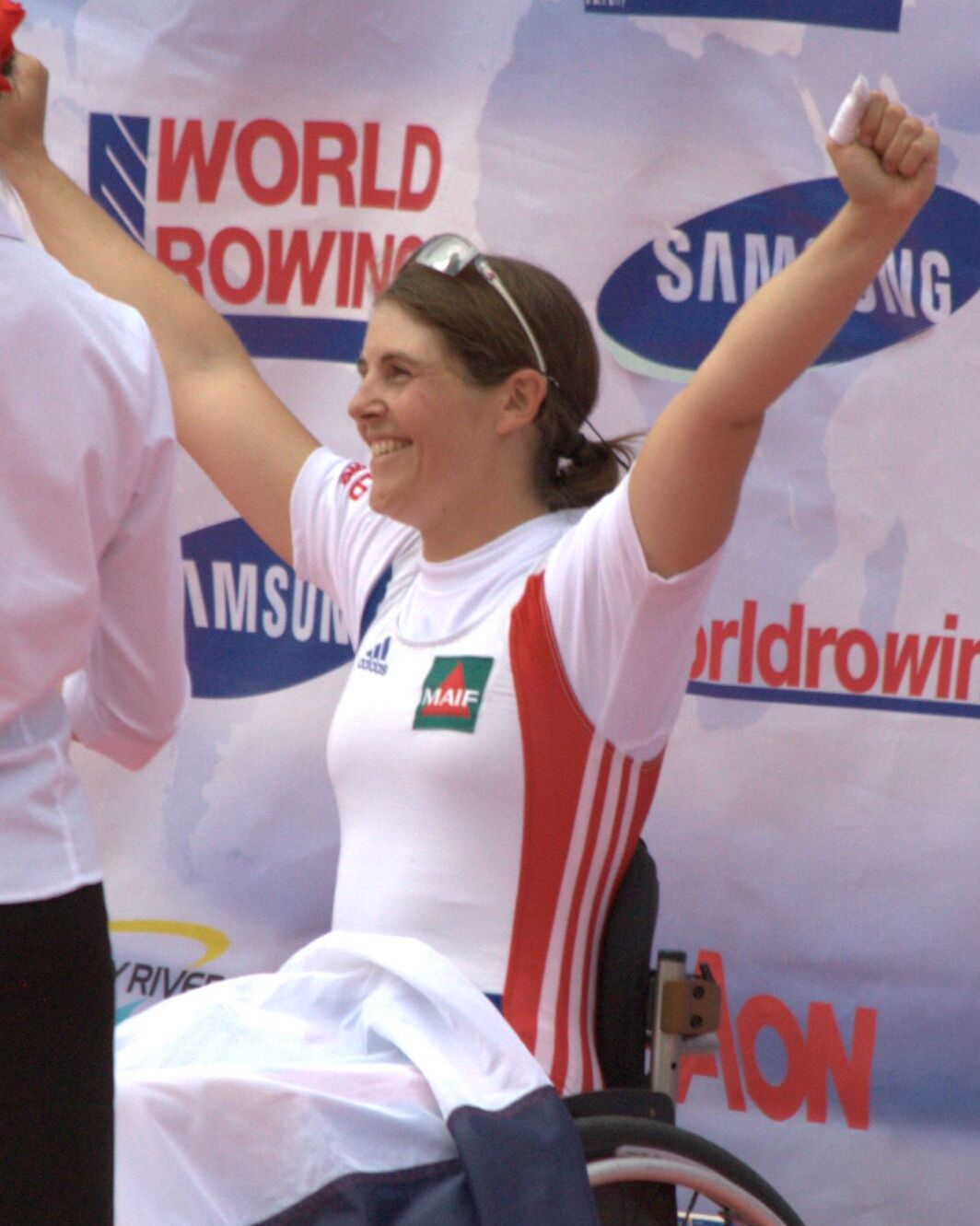
- Benoit in 2009

Personal information
- Born: 12 June 1980 (age 46) Aix en Provence, Bouches-du-Rhône, France

Sport
- Sport: Para-rowing
- Disability class: PR1
Medal record
Para-rowing
Representing France
Paralympic Games
Silver medal – second place	2012 London	ASW1x
Bronze medal – third place	2020 Tokyo	PR1 W1x
Bronze medal – third place	2024 Paris	PR1 W1x
World Championships
Gold medal – first place	2010 Cambridge	ASW1x
Silver medal – second place	2009 Poznań	ASW1x
Silver medal – second place	2011 Bled	ASW1x
Silver medal – second place	2019 Ottensheim	PR1 W1x
Silver medal – second place	2022 Račice	PR1 W1x
Silver medal – second place	2023 Belgrade	PR1 W1x
European Championships
Gold medal – first place	2020 Poznań	PR1 W1x
Bronze medal – third place	2023 Bled	PR1 W1x
Bronze medal – third place	2024 Szeged	PR1 W1x

Nathalie Benoit (born 12 June 1980 in Aix en Provence) is a French Paralympian. She won a silver medal at the 2012 Summer Paralympics in Women's single sculls rowing.
