= Chelsea Wolfe (BMX cyclist) =

American freestyle BMX cyclist (born 1993)

Personal information
- Born: May 5, 1993 (age 33)
- Home town: Lake Park, Florida, United States
- Education: University of Central Florida

Sport
- Sport: Freestyle BMX

Chelsea Wolfe (born May 5, 1993) is an American freestyle BMX cyclist. She was an alternate for the women's BMX freestyle team representing the United States at the 2020 Summer Olympics, making her the first openly transgender sportsperson to qualify for the Olympics for the United States.

== Early life and education ==
Chelsea Wolfe is from Lake Park, Florida, and was raised in a family of BMX riders. She began riding the bike when she was six years old. Her family traveled across Florida in a recreational vehicle for her to compete across the state. She came out as a trans girl to her mother at 17 years old. She attended Inlet Grove Community High School and the University of Central Florida.

== Career ==
Wolfe had already undergone gender transition when she began competing as an amateur in 2014. She began traveling across the United States to compete in 2016 after it was announced that freestyle BMX would be included in the 2020 Summer Olympics. She placed fifth at the UCI BMX World Championships in 2021, earning her a spot as an alternate in the 2020 Summer Olympics, making her the first openly transgender sportsperson to qualify for the Olympics for the United States.

In 2023, Wolfe was scheduled to compete at the UCI BMX World Championships again in Scotland, which, if she had won the world title, would have qualified her to represent the United States at the 2024 Summer Olympics. However, she was unable to compete due to the Union Cycliste Internationale implementing a new rule banning transgender women from participation in the women's category. The decision effectively ended her competitive BMX freestyle career and stopped her from receiving money from competitions. The United States Olympic & Paralympic Committee was supportive of her and provided her with a therapist, which she said she would not have been able to afford otherwise. After the UCI ended her BMX career, she was placed on suicide watch.

== Personal life ==
Due to her gender identity, Wolfe has faced transphobic hatred at competitions and has lost contact with some members of her family. Wolfe is autistic. Wolfe volunteered for Jack the Bike Man, an organization based in Florida that refurbishes bicycles in order to donate them to marginalized groups.

== See also ==
- List of LGBTQ Olympians and Paralympians
- Transgender people in sports
