= Mathilde Petriaux =

French former Olympic field hockey player

Personal information
- Nickname: Math
- National team: France
- Born: 23 July 1997 (age 29) Mont-Saint-Aignan
- Education: Emlyon Business School (2023–2024)
- Occupations: General Secretary of the French Hockey Federation, psychomotor therapist, consultant, and former field hockey player
- Years active: 2011–2025

Sport
- Country: France
- Sport: Field hockey
- Position: Goalkeeper

Mathilde Petriaux (born 23 July 1997) is a French former Olympic field hockey player. She was a goalkeeper for the French national team and Real Sociedad Hockey during her professional sporting career. Petriaux is now the general secretary of the French Hockey Federation and is part of the athlete's committee of the French Anti-Doping Agency.

== Biography ==
Mathilde Petriaux was born on 23 July 1997. She started playing field hockey at the age of 11 in Normandy. Petriaux played for Yvetot Hockey Club Cauchois from 2008–2013. When Petriaux moved to a Sports Studies school in Watigny she moved clubs to LUC Ronchin Hockey from 2013–2014 then the Lille Métropole hockey club from 2014–2017.

Petriaux played professionally for four years in Belgium, then for Real Sociedad in Spain, playing simultaneously for the French team.

Petriaux was a substitute goalkeeper for the France women's national field hockey team in the 2024 Summer Olympics. During her playing career she was a part of the Athletes’ Commission of the French National Olympic and Sports Committee.

In December 2024 Petriaux was elected to the post of general secretary at the French Hockey Federation and retired from playing hockey in 2025.

== Personal life ==
Petriaux married her wife in 2022. The pair have been together since 2018.

== Recognition ==
Petriaux was nominated for the International Hockey Federation's 2019 goalkeeper of the year.

== See also ==
- France women's national field hockey team
- List of LGBTQ Olympians and Paralympians
