= 2025 World Rowing Championships – PR1 Women's single sculls =

PR1 Women's single sculls at the 2025 World Rowing Championships
- Venue: Dianshan Lake
- Location: Shanghai, China
- Dates: 22–26 September
- Competitors: 6 from 6 nations
- Winning time: 10:18.49

Medalists
gold medal	Anna Sheremet	Ukraine
silver medal	Kim Se-jeong	South Korea
bronze medal	Shao Shasha	China

The PR1 women's single sculls competition at the 2025 World Rowing Championships took place at Dianshan Lake, in Shanghai.

== Schedule ==
The schedule was as follows:

Date	Time	Round
Monday 22 September 2025	10:15	Preliminary race
Friday, 26 September 2025	style=background:lemonchiffon 14:05	Final A

All times are UTC+08:00

== Results ==
=== Preliminary round ===
All boats advanced to the final.

Rank	Rower	Country	Time	Notes
1	Anna Sheremet	Ukraine	10:06.93	FA
2	Kim Se-jeong	South Korea	10:43.23	FA
3	Shao Shasha	China	10:49.31	FA
4	Claire Ghiringhelli	Switzerland	11:07.78	FA
5	Zahraa Mohamed	Egypt	13:38.99	FA
6	Zofia Seweryn	Poland	13:38.99	FA

==== Final ====
The final took place at 14:05 on 26 September.

Rank	Rower	Country	Time	Notes
1st place, gold medalist(s)	Anna Sheremet	Ukraine	10:18.49	
2nd place, silver medalist(s)	Kim Se-jeong	South Korea	10:47.53	
3rd place, bronze medalist(s)	Shao Shasha	China	10:50.78	
4	Claire Ghiringhelli	Switzerland	11:06.19	
5	Zahraa Mohamed	Egypt	12:58.52	
6	Zofia Seweryn	Poland	14:05.80	
