= Birgit Skarstein =

Norwegian Paralympic athlete

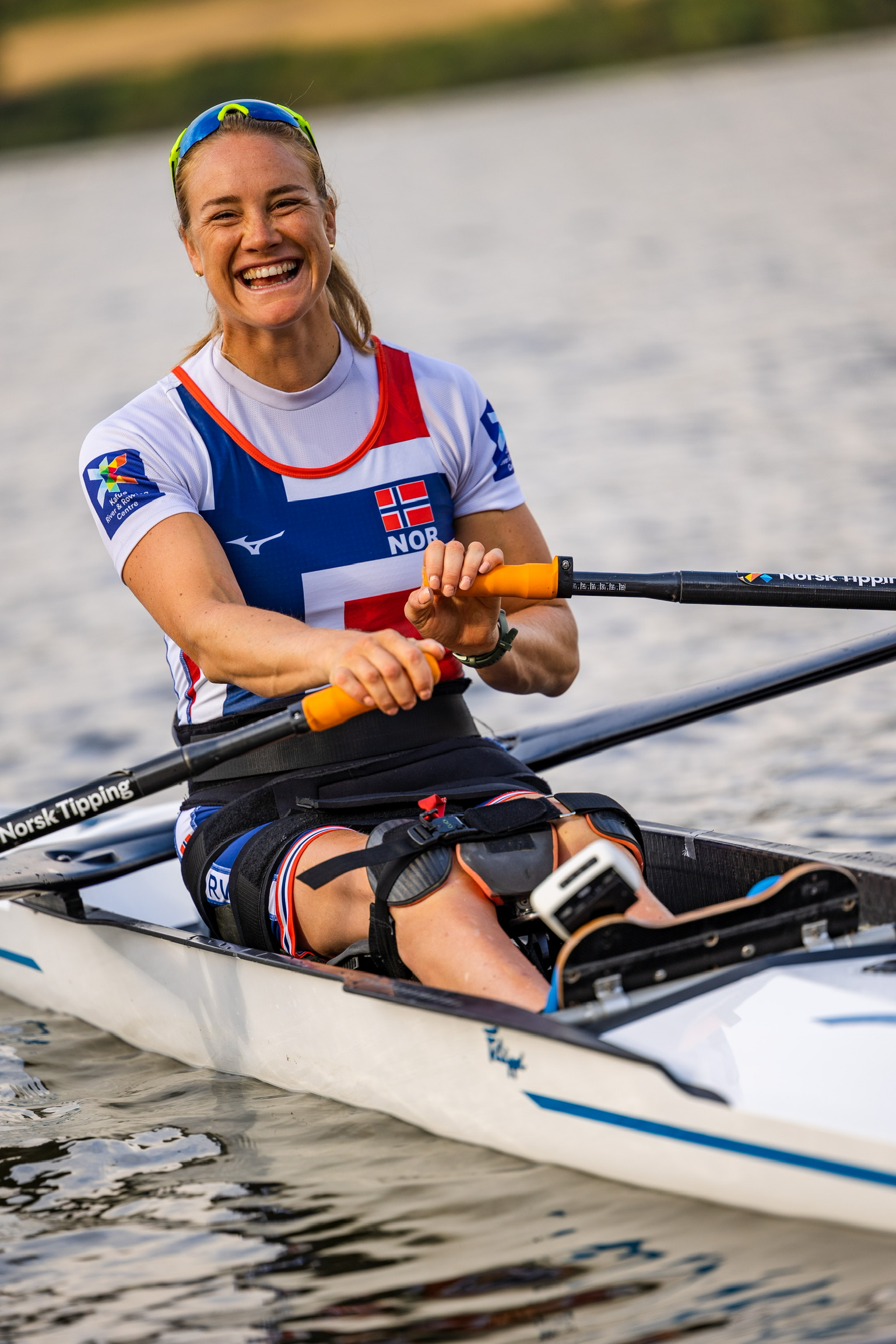
- Skarstein in 2021

Personal information
- Full name: Birgit Lovise Røkkum Skarstein
- Nationality: Norwegian
- Born: 10 February 1989 (age 37)

Sport
- Sport: Para rowing Para cross-country skiing
- Disability class: PR1
Medal record
Representing Norway
Women's para rowing
Summer Paralympics
Gold medal – first place	2020 Tokyo	PR1 single sculls
Silver medal – second place	2024 Paris	PR1 single sculls
World Championships
Gold medal – first place	2014 Amsterdam	AS single sculls
Gold medal – first place	2017 Sarasota	PR1 single sculls
Gold medal – first place	2018 Plovdiv	PR1 single sculls
Gold medal – first place	2019 Ottensheim	PR1 single sculls
Gold medal – first place	2022 Račice	PR1 single sculls
Gold medal – first place	2023 Belgrade	PR1 single sculls
Silver medal – second place	2013 Chungju	AS single sculls
Bronze medal – third place	2015 Aiguebelette-le-lac	AS single sculls
European Championships
Gold medal – first place	2021 Varese	PR1 single sculls
Gold medal – first place	2022 Oberschleißheim	PR1 single sculls
Gold medal – first place	2023 Bled	PR1 single sculls
Gold medal – first place	2024 Szeged	PR1 single sculls
Women's para cross-country skiing
World Championships
Silver medal – second place	2017 Finsterau	12.5 km sitting
Bronze medal – third place	2017 Finsterau	5 km sitting
Bronze medal – third place	2019 Prince George	5 km sitting
Bronze medal – third place	2019 Prince George	12.5 km sitting

Birgit Lovise Røkkum Skarstein (born 10 February 1989) is a Norwegian former Paralympic athlete and social entrepreneur who competed in para rowing and para cross-country skiing. She is a Paralympic champion and silver medallist, six-time world champion and four-time European champion in single sculls. Skarstein has won a total of twelve World Championships medals, eight in rowing and four in cross-country skiing, and holds the world best time in women's single sculls. She announced her retirement on 1 January 2025.

Skarstein won the gold medal in the women's single sculls at the 2020 Summer Paralympics and the silver medal in the women's single sculls at the 2024 Summer Paralympics. She has won the world cup overall title in both rowing and cross-country skiing and has several individual world cup wins in both sports. Skarstein was in 2018 elected as a member of the International Paralympic Committee Athletes’ Council, where she in 2022 was re-elected for a second term.

Skarstein is a member of World Economic Forum’s Global Shapers, and was a delegate and speaker at the World Economic Forum Annual Meeting in Davos in 2022, as well as a panellist and speaker at the Nobel Peace Prize Nobel Week Dialogue on the topic of "Future of Life".

== Background ==
Skarstein grew up in Levanger Municipality in Norway and was active within school politics and activities such as climbing, hiking and swimming. After finishing high school in 2008 she travelled to Thailand to work as a volunteer at an orphanage. Whilst travelling to renew her visa in December 2008, she injured her foot in a diving accident – an accident that required surgery. She was flown home to Norway and underwent several procedures. During one of the procedures she had an injection of anaesthetic into the epidural space of the spine, but it never wore off. She gradually lost the feeling in her legs, making her paralyzed.

== Athletic career ==
In rowing at the 2016 Summer Paralympics, Skarstein finished fourth in the single sculls event. In cross-country skiing at the 2014 Winter Paralympics, she competed in the 1 km sprint classic, 5 km free, and 15 km free events. In cross-country skiing at the 2018 Winter Paralympics, she competed in the 1.5 km sprint classic, 7.5 km classic, and 15 km free events.

Skarstein won a gold medal in PR1W1x at the 2017 World Rowing Championships in Sarasota, ahead of Moran Samuel.

In 2019, Skarstein qualified to represent Norway at the 2020 Summer Paralympics held in Tokyo after winning the gold medal in the PR1 women's single sculls event at the 2019 World Rowing Championships. She won the gold medal in the women's single sculls at the 2020 Summer Paralympics with a time of 10.56,88. In 2023, Skarstein set a new world record in the women's single sculls with the time of 9.47,83 at the World Rowing Cup in Varese. She won the silver medal in the women's single sculls at the 2024 Summer Paralympics in Paris.

She announced her retirement on 1 January 2025.

== Career ==
Skarstein holds a degree in political sciences from the University of Oslo. She has actively been involved within politics and boards throughout her life and athletic career. She has served in the City Council of Oslo, been a member of the Norwegian Biotechnology Advisory Board and World Economic Forum's Global Shapers, elected as a member of Norwegian Crown Prince Haakon's SIKT-alumni, and served as a board member of Sparebankstiftelsen DNB, Stiftelsen VI and Sunnaasstiftelsen.

In 2020, Skarstein participated in Skal vi danse, the Norwegian version of Dancing with the Stars, becoming the first wheelchair user to appear on the program. Skarstein and her Swedish dance partner Philip Raabe established themselves as potential favourites to win the 2020 season, impressing both the judges and viewers. They made it all the way to the eighth week before losing out in a dance duel against Michael Andreassen and Ewa Trela.

In 2021, Skarstein was featured in the children's book "My first biography" by Kristian Grue. She wanted to use the opportunity to create a more diverse offering to kids.

Skarstein is also an ambassador for MOT, Stiftelsen VI, and Right To Play.

== Awards ==
In 2019, Skarstein was awarded Egebergs Ærespris for her efforts and contribution in multiple sports. In 2021, she was awarded the Peer Gynt Prize.

== Personal life ==
Skarstein is close friends with dancer Helene Spilling, with the pair having met on Skal vi danse. In April 2025, she announced her engagement to her partner Christian Semb. In August 2025, Skarstein and Semb welcomed their first child together, a son.

Preceded by Nils-Erik Ulset	Egebergs Ærespris; 2019	Succeeded by Therese Johaug
