= Nick Wagman =

American dressage rider (born 1973)

Personal information
- National team: United States
- Born: July 31, 1973 (age 51)
- Home town: San Diego, California, U.S.
- Spouse: Kurt Gering

Sport
- Sport: Dressage

Nick Wagman (born July 31, 1973) is an American dressage rider.

== Career ==
In 2018, Wagman won the USEF Grand Prix Dressage Reserve championship with his horse, Don John. As a result, he received a grant from the United States Equestrian Team to help fund a trip to Europe. In 2019, he won the USEF Developing Horse Grand Prix National Championship with his horse Ferano.

Wagman trained with Don John since the horse was five years old. A week after acquiring Don John, the horse bucked Wagman due to being sensitive to the girth of the saddle, and Wagman fractured his back from the incident. The two worked together well for several years after that, but Wagman fell again in 2019, this time breaking an arm and three ribs. He considered retiring from dressage but chose to continue the sport.

Wagman was planned to be a reserve member of Team USA at the 2020 Summer Olympics, but ultimately was withdrawn after his horse, Don John, sustained a minor injury. Don John retired in 2022 after a CDS San Diego Chapter Show, where he and Wagman set a personal best score of 75.652%. Wagman has said that his least favorite dressage movement is the rein-back.

Wagman did not participate in the 2024 Summer Olympics in Paris, but aims to compete in the 2028 Summer Olympics in Los Angeles. In 2021, Wagman stated that his favorite athlete of Team USA was Simone Biles.

== Personal life ==
Wagman is gay and is married to swimmer Kurt Gering. In a 2021 interview, Wagman stated that his relationship with his husband was his greatest achievement.

== See also ==
- List of LGBTQ Olympians and Paralympians
