= Lily Wang =

Chinese-American statistician

Li Lily Wang is a Chinese–American statistician whose research interests include nonparametric statistics, semiparametric statistics, big data analytics, high-dimensional data, and official statistics. She is a professor of statistics at George Mason University.

== Education and career ==
Wang studied economics at Tongji University, graduating in 2000, and earned a master's degree in mathematics from Tongji University in 2003. She completed a Ph.D. in statistics at Michigan State University in 2007. Her dissertation, Polynomial Spline Smoothing for Nonlinear Time Series, was supervised by Li-Jian Yang.

She became a faculty member in the University of Georgia department of statistics in 2007, and moved to Iowa State University as an associate professor in 2014. While holding these faculty positions, she has also worked as a visiting scholar at the United States Census Bureau, Bureau of Labor Statistics, and U.S. Securities and Exchange Commission.

== Recognition ==
Wang was named an Elected Member of the International Statistical Institute in 2008. In 2020 she was named a Fellow of the Institute of Mathematical Statistics "for contributions to spatial, survey, image and functional analysis using nonparametric and semiparametric methods, especially to partially linear models, confidence envelopes and bivariate smoothing". She became a Fellow of the American Statistical Association in 2021.
