= Mason Phelps Jr. =

American equestrian (1949–2021)

Mason Phelps III
- Born: 1949
- Died: May 19, 2021 (aged 74–75)
- Occupations: Equestrian and public relations
- Employer: Phelps Media Group
- Known for: Member of the 1968 US Olympic equestrian team
- Website: Phelps Media Group

Mason Phelps III (1949 – 19 May 2021), often referred to as "Mason Phelps Jr.", was an American equestrian rider, founder of Phelps Media Group, and an Olympian. He was also president of the National Horse Show.

== Equestrian career ==
In 1965, Phelps attended his first United States Equestrian Team Clinic at the age of sixteen. He competed in the World Championships in Ireland, where he earned 12th place. Next Phelps earned a position as an alternate with the US equestrian team on the 1968 Summer Olympics Three Day Eventing squad. That year he was also named U.S. Combined Training Association's Rider of the Year.

In the early 1970s, Phelps opened a stable and began training hunters and jumpers. He also became an event manager for equestrian shows. He founded the San Antonio AA Rated Xmas Show and the New England Horseman's Association Hunt Seat Medal in Springfield, Massachusetts. Phelps would also become the president of the National Horse Show, where he among other things oversaw the event move its annual location to Lexington, Kentucky. He was also the event organizer for the 2012 World Dressage Masters, and founded the International Jumping Derby.

== Phelps Media Group ==
In 2002 Phelps co-founded the public relations firm Phelps, Wilkes & Associates. Their first client was the National Horse Show, which was moving its location from Madison Square Garden in NYC to Wellington, Florida. In 2004 Phelps founded the Phelps Media Group as an equestrian-oriented public relations agency. It helps equestrian shows put together and market their events, in addition to serving as a public relations representative to members of the equestrian community. In 2011 Phelps was named to the Wellington Chamber of Commerce President's Circle, for building "America's most progressive and successful equestrian public relations firm".

== Philanthropy ==
In 1996, after the death of his brother to AIDS, Phelps and Robert Dover founded the Equestrian AIDS Foundation, in order to raise money for those in the equestrian community suffering from HIV/AIDS. The organization has since changed its name to the Equestrian Aid Foundation, as it began also raising and distributing money to those in the equestrian community that have suffered calamitous injuries in the sport. Phelps helped the Florida charity Back to Basics, which provides basic essentials children need to go to school. In addition, he threw charity events and galas, including events in support of the United States Equestrian Team—raising more than a million dollars between 1996 and 2002.

== Personal life ==
Phelps' father was Mason Phelps, and his mother was Peggy Phelps. He was one of three children, including his late brother Taylor who was the road manager for Crosby, Stills, Nash & Young, and later worked for Stephen Stills, The Band and Neil Young. Phelps was one of many gay equestrians and noted "I would say that many gays are involved in the horse world ... It is certainly no secret. This is a very accepting community." He organized an annual Gay Polo Tournament, for the Gay Polo League.
