= Terry Hayes (fencer) =

American wheelchair fencer

Personal information
- Home town: North Fort Myers, Florida, United States
- Education: Atlantic Christian College; Helen A. Keller Institute for Human Disabilities

Sport
- Country: United States
- Sport: Wheelchair fencing
- Disability: Cerebellar degeneration
- Disability class: Class B
- Club: Southwest Florida Fencing Academy; Zeljkovic Fencing Academy
- Coached by: Charlie Johnson; Brent Myers; Mickey Zeljkovic

Terry Hayes is an American wheelchair fencer who competes in Category B events. She competed for United States in the 2020 Summer Paralympics. She served as a torch bearer for the 2002 Winter Olympics held in Salt Lake City. Before becoming a fencer, she was a special education teacher and served as a heavy equipment operator with the United States Army.

== Early and personal life ==
Hayes graduated from Atlantic Christian College, and she was part of the lacrosse team at Old Dominion University. She served as a heavy equipment operator in the United States Army and later worked as a special education teacher.

Hayes identifies as a lesbian and is married to Freda Routt. The couple met while attending church in Norfolk, Virginia, and have been together since the late 1990s. In 2002, Routt nominated her to serve as a torch bearer for the 2002 Winter Olympics held in Salt Lake City.

In 2000, Hayes was diagnosed with systemic lupus; she retired from her job as a teacher and studied for a graduate degree in assistive technology to continue to help children with disabilities. In 2011, Hayes was further diagnosed with primary cerebellar degeneration, a progressive neurological disorder. The disease results in the deterioration of neurons in the cerebellum, the area of the brain that controls coordination and balance, which eventually left her paralyzed from the waist down and dependent on a wheelchair.

== Career ==
Following her diagnosis, Hayes attended a sports camp for women with disabilities and became interested in adaptive sports. While searching for adaptive sports opportunities, she came across a video of Lauryn DeLuca competing in wheelchair fencing at the 2016 Summer Paralympics. She felt that the sport would suit her because it could be contested using a single arm as she had weakness on the other arm. She contacted fencing coach Charles Johnson at the Southwest Florida Fencing Academy, who adapted training methods and facilities to accommodate wheelchair fencing. She competes in Category B events.

By 2019, Hayes had established herself as a member of the United States wheelchair fencing team. She competed at several competitions including the Wheelchair Fencing World Championships and Wheelchair Fencing World Cup. At the World Championships, she was part of the United States women's sabre team that finished ninth. She also took part in Category B individual events in sabre, foil, and epee.

Hayes was selected to the United States team for the 2020 Summer Paralympics in Tokyo. At wheelchair fencing at the Paralympic Games, she competed in the women's individual épée Category B and women's individual sabre Category B events, as well as the women's team épée and women's team foil competitions. In the women's sabre Category B event, Hayes advanced from the pool stage before being eliminated in the knockout rounds and finishing 12th overall. In the women's épée Category B event, she finished 14th. The United States women's team placed seventh in team épée and eighth in team foil.
