= Sandra Khumalo =

South African rower

Personal information
- Nationality: South African
- Born: April 4, 1981 (age 44)

Sport
- Sport: Rowing

Sandra Khumalo (born 4 April 1981) is a South African rower who competed at the 2012 Summer Paralympics and has qualified for the 2016 Games.

== Personal life ==
In 2005, at the age of 24, Khumalo was injured in a car accident. Whilst travelling to her job in a safari lodge at the Kruger National Park in Mpumalanga, the Land Rover she was travelling in was hit by a truck. The accident damaged her spinal cord and left her lower body paralysed.

Khumalo and her husband Siba have two daughters.

== Rowing ==
Following her accident Khumalo moved to Durban, where her husband was starting a new job, and in 2008 she took up swimming to improve her upper body strength. She was then approached by Midlands Rowing Club in 2010 who were looking for athletes. She began training with a coach in Pietermaritzburg, 90 km away from Durban. She later joined Durban rowing club and was taken to a training camp for the national team.

Khumalo qualified to compete for South Africa at the 2012 Summer Paralympics, held in London, United Kingdom, in the women's single sculls by winning the silver medal at the final qualification regatta in Belgrade, Serbia. She was the only rower in the South African team. At the Games she placed fifth in her heat in a time of 6 minutes 2.38 seconds and then entered the repechage round where she finished fourth in a time of 6 minutes 13.23 seconds. she advanced to the B final where she finished second, in a time of 6 minutes 18.88 seconds, meaning she placed eighth overall.

At the 2013 World Rowing Championships held at Tangeum Lake, Chungju in South Korea, Khumalo placed third in her single sculls heat and then second in the repechage to reach the A final, eventually finishing sixth in a time of 6 minutes 6.25 seconds. At the 2014 World Rowing Championships in Amsterdam, the Netherlands, she again reached the A final via the repechage, finishing sixth in a time of 5 minutes 56.12 seconds. At the 2015 World Championships at Lac d'Aiguebelette, Aiguebelette in France, she finished third in her heat and fourth in the semifinals to advance to the B final, which she won in a time of 5 minutes 48.89 seconds. This was enough to place her in the top eight boats and ensure qualification for the 2016 Summer Paralympics to be held in Rio de Janeiro, Brazil.

In 2013 Khumalo was a finalist for the SPAR gsport Athlete of the Year with Disability award which was eventually won by women's wheelchair tennis player Kgothatso Montjane.
