= Sylvia Pille-Steppat =

Personal information
- Born: 12 October 1967 (age 58) Stuttgart, West Germany

Sport
- Sport: Adaptive rowing
- Disability: Multiple sclerosis
Medal record
Representing Germany
World Championships
| Bronze medal – third place | 2017 Sarasota | PR1W1x |
European Championships
| Bronze medal – third place | 2020 Poznan | PR1W1x |

Sylvia Pille-Steppat (born 12 October 1967) is a German adaptive rower who competes in international rowing competitions. She is a World and European bronze medalist, she has also competed at the 2020 Summer Paralympics but did not medal.

Pille-Steppat was a competitive marathon runner who took part in numerous competitions before she was diagnosed with multiple sclerosis aged 34. She is a consulting architect who works in Hamburg.
