= Moran Samuel =

Israeli paralympic basketball player and rower

Moran Samuel מורן סמואל
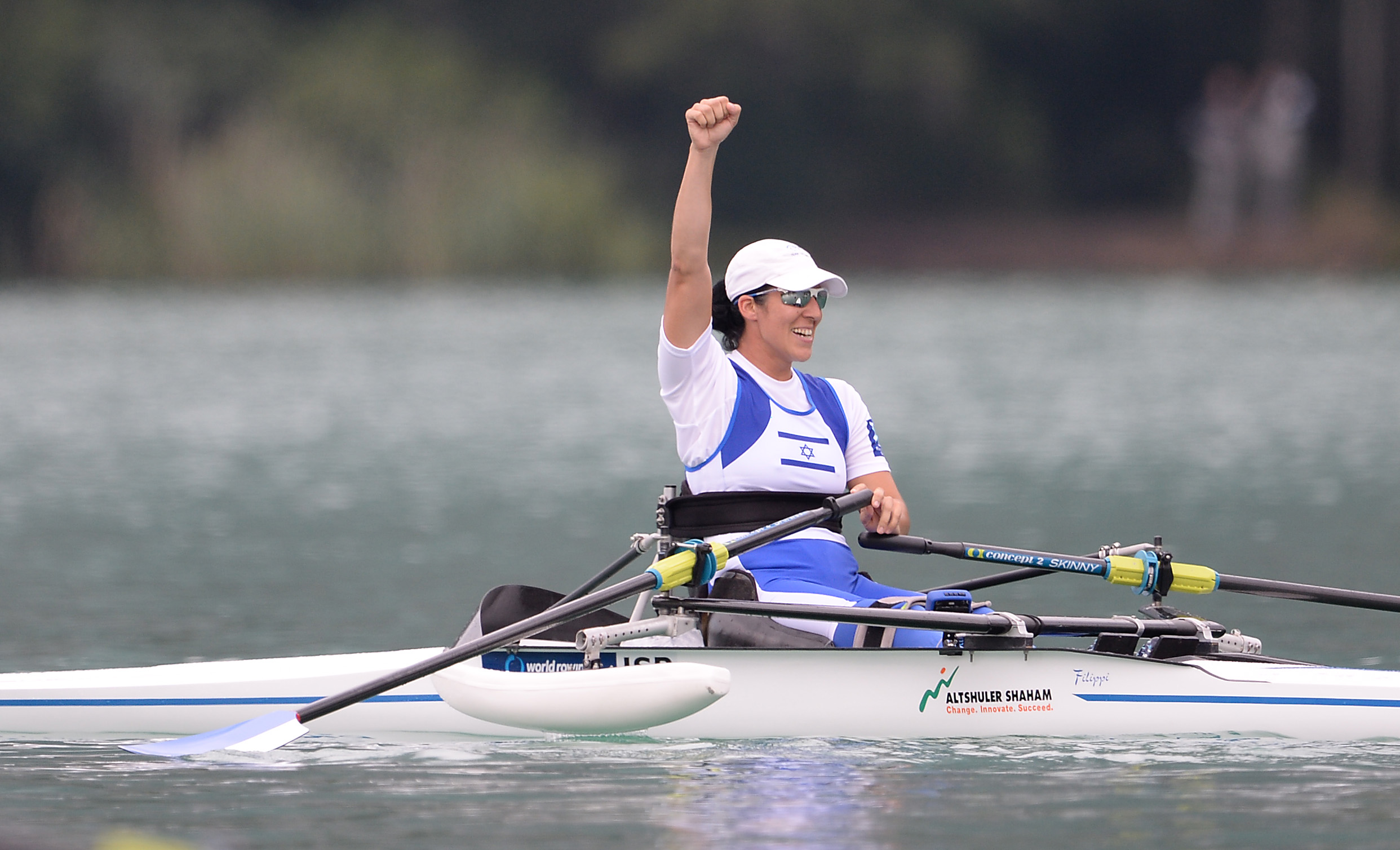

Personal information
- Nationality: Israeli
- Born: 24 April 1982 (age 44) Karmiel, Israel
- Education: Physiotherapy from University of Haifa
- Occupation: Athlete
- Spouse: Wife Limor Samuel Goldberg

Sport
- Country: Israel
- Sport: Para-rowing
- Disability class: PR1
- Club: Daniel Rowing Centre [Tel Aviv, ISR]
- Coached by: Paola Grizzetti [personal], ITA

Achievements and titles
- Paralympic finals: Winning silver in the arms only single sculls at the 2020 Paralympic Games in Tokyo
- World finals: the 2015 Para Athlete of the Year by World Rowing
Medal record
Women's para-rowing
Representing Israel
Paralympic Games
Gold medal – first place	2024 Paris	PR1W1x
Silver medal – second place	2020 Tokyo	ASW1x
Bronze medal – third place	2016 Rio de Janeiro	ASW1x
World Championships
Gold medal – first place	2015 Aiguebelette	ASW1x
Silver medal – second place	2014 Amsterdam	ASW1x
Silver medal – second place	2017 Sarasota	PR1W1x
Silver medal – second place	2018 Plovdiv	PR1W1x
Bronze medal – third place	2011 Bled	ASW1x
Bronze medal – third place	2019 Ottensheim	PR1W1x
World Rowing Cup
Gold medal – first place	2015 Varese	ASW1x
Bronze medal – third place	2011 Munich	ASW1x
Bronze medal – third place	2016 Poznań	ASW1x
European Championships
Silver medal – second place	2023 Bled	PR1W1x

Moran Samuel (Hebrew: מורן סמואל; 24 April 1982) is an Israeli paralympic basketball player and world champion rower. She was chosen to light a ceremonial torch on Israel's Independence Day in 2019. She represented Israel at the 2020 Summer Paralympics. She won a gold medal competing for Israel at the 2024 Paris Paralympics in the Women's single sculls.

== Early life ==
Samuel grew up in Karmiel, Israel, in a Jewish family. She began playing basketball in her hometown. During her military service in the Israeli Air Force, she was an outstanding athlete enrolled in a program that permits top athletes to complete their mandatory service while representing the country in sports as well; after her service, she played on the Israel women's national basketball team.

In 2006, Samuel suffered a spinal stroke and became paralyzed in her lower body. After she recovered, she completed her academic studies at Haifa University and became a physical therapist, and then worked with the Paralympic Sports Association team on the re-establishment of the Israeli women's basketball team on wheelchairs.

== Sports career ==
=== Basketball ===
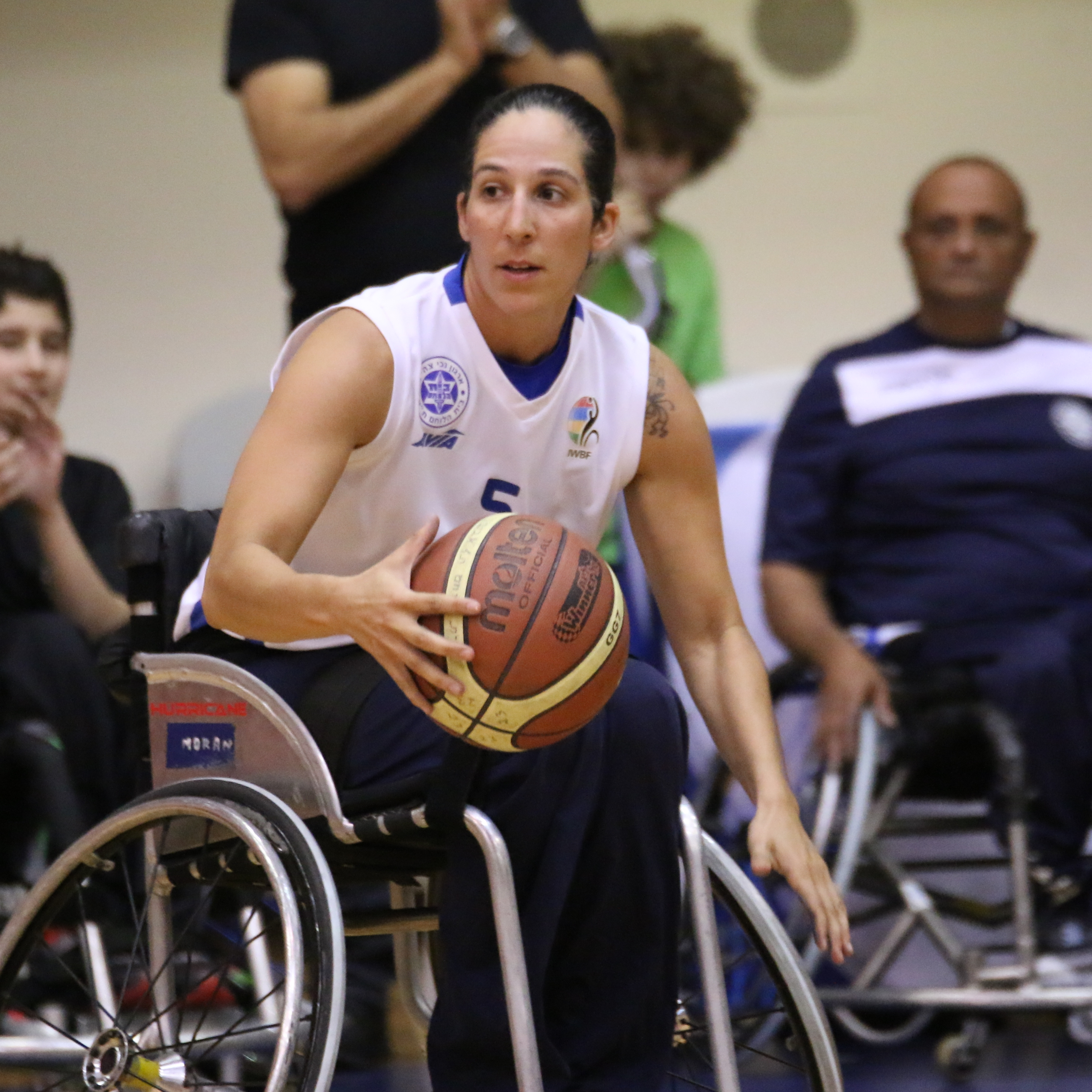
Samuel in 2016

Playing with the national women's basketball team, she qualified for the European Wheelchair Basketball Championship, held in Nazareth in 2011, and simultaneously joined the Beit HaLohem team in Tel Aviv, with Samuel being the sole woman in an all-male team. Beit LaLohem won the double championship in 2011. In 2013, she played for Israel at the European Wheelchair Basketball Championship in Frankfurt, with the team finishing in the seventh place overall. At this competition, she was voted one of the five best players in Europe titled "All Star Team".

=== Rowing ===
Samuel switched to Para rowing because she wanted to represent Israel at the Paralympic Games.

As part of her paralympic sport activities, and as suggested by her life partner, also a rower, Samuel started to train in rowing in 2010 and represented Israel at the 2012 Summer Paralympic Games in London, finishing fifth. Earlier that year, she won a race in single scull competition at the Adaptive Rowing Regatte in Gavirate, Italy, but the organizers did not have a copy of the Hatikva, Israel's national anthem; she asked for the microphone and sang it instead. In 2015, she won the gold medal at the World Cup event in Lake Varese, defeating the reigning world champion, Norwegian rower Birgit Skarstein.

At the 2015 World Rowing Championships held in Lac d'Aiguebelette, France, Samuel won the gold medal in the women's AS single sculls, thus earning a spot at the 2016 Summer Paralympics in Rio de Janeiro. Also, she received the bronze medal in June 2016 at the World Rowing Cup in Poznań.

Samuel won the silver medal in the arms-only single sculls at the 2020 Summer Paralympic Games in Tokyo. It was after setting her personal best record in the repechage the day before.

==== 2024 Paris Paralympics ====
She won a gold medal competing for Israel at the 2024 Paris Paralympics in the Women's single sculls. She said: "we started today with terrible news [referencing the killing of six hostages in Gaza... and three police officers in the West Bank]... I told myself, ‘Moran, this is due to, this is because of and this is despite'” the difficult situation facing Israel at home. It's a privilege to be here in this bubble at the Paralympic Games, and to finish with a gold medal — and to be able to scream the anthem from deep inside me is a moment I'll never forget in my life... I wasn't even sure I'd be able to sing the anthem... I hope everyone comes home."

== Honors ==
Samuel took part in the torch-lighting ceremony at the 2017 Maccabiah Games.

In 2019 Samuel was honored as one of the torchbearers in the national Israeli Independence Day ceremony.

== Personal life ==
Samuel is a lesbian. She and her wife have 2 children.

== See also ==
- List of 2024 Summer Paralympics medal winners
- List of LGBT Olympians and Paralympians
- List of Paralympic medalists in rowing
