= Hallie Smith =

American rower born 1993

Personal information
- Born: 18 April 1993 (age 33)
- Home town: Washington DC, United States
- Education: Smith College
- Height: 5 ft 5 in (165 cm)
- Weight: 160 lb (73 kg)

Sport
- Country: United States
- Sport: Rowing
- Disability class: PR1
- Event: Single sculls
Medal record
Representing United States
Women's para rowing
World Championships
Bronze medal – third place	2018 Plovdiv	PR1 Women's single sculls

Hallie Smith (born 18 April 1993) is an American para rower. She represented the United States in women's rowing at the 2020 Summer Paralympics. She contested at three consecutive World Rowing Championships from 2017 to 2019, and won a bronze medal in the PR1 single sculls event at the 2018 edition.

== Early and personal life ==
Hallie Smith was born on 18 April 1993, to Joe and Vicky Smith. She has a brother, Tom Smith, who serves as a flight officer with the United States Navy. She attended St. Stephen's and St. Agnes School and graduated from Smith College in 2015 with a degree in psychology.

Smith experienced several seizures during her college years and was later diagnosed with hereditary spastic paraplegia, a rare neurological disorder that caused progressive weakness and spasticity in her legs. During her college years, the condition worsened and she became paralyzed in May 2014. She is also known for performing her own wheelchair repairs and adjustments. Smith identifies as LGBTQ.

== Career ==
In 2016, while participating in a rehabilitation exercise program at MedStar National Rehabilitation Hospital in Washington, D.C., Smith was encouraged by a rowing coach to try an indoor rowing machine. She subsequently took up para rowing and progressed quickly through the ranks. Within two months of taking up the sport, she achieved the USRowing elite standard time for para-rowers and subsequently began competing at the national level.

In 2017, Smith earned selection to the United States team for the 2017 World Rowing Championships, making her international debut in the PR1 women's single sculls event. She represented the United States at three consecutive World Rowing Championships from 2017 to 2019, competing in the PR1 single sculls event at each edition. She won a bronze medal in the PR1 single sculls event at the 2018 edition held in Plovdiv. She won a gold medal in the same category in the 2018 World Rowing Indoor Championships. She holds the 2000 metres indoor record in the PR1 single sculls event.

Smith secured first place in the PR1 single sculls event at the 2020 U.S. Olympic and Paralympic Team Trials, and qualified for the 2020 Summer Paralympics. At the 2020 Paralympics, the single sculls event took place in Tokyo between 27 and 29 August 2021. In her qualifying heat, Smith finished sixth and last. In the repechage heats, she finished fourth out of the five competitors with a time of 12 minutes and 13.12 seconds. She was ranked tenth out of the 12 competitors in the final classification, after finishing fourth in the classification final 'B'.
