= Anna Sheremet =

Ukrainian rower (born 2001)

Personal information
- Born: 18 April 2001 (age 25)

Sport
- Sport: Adaptive rowing
Medal record
Representing Ukraine
World Championships
Gold medal – first place	2025 Shanghai	PR1W1x
Gold medal – first place	2026 Amsterdam	PR1W1x
Bronze medal – third place	2022 Racice	PR1W1x
Bronze medal – third place	2023 Belgrade	PR1W1x
European Championships
Gold medal – first place	2025 Plovdiv	PR1W1x
Gold medal – first place	2026 Varese	PR1W1x
Silver medal – second place	2020 Poznan	PR1W1x
Bronze medal – third place	2021 Varese	PR1W1x
Bronze medal – third place	2022 Munich	PR1W1x

Anna Sheremet (born 18 April 2001) is a Ukrainian rower who competes in international rowing competitions. She is a double World bronze medalist and a three-time European medalist, she has also competed at the 2020 Summer Paralympics but did not medal.
