= Cláudia Santos =

Brazilian adaptive rower (born 1977)

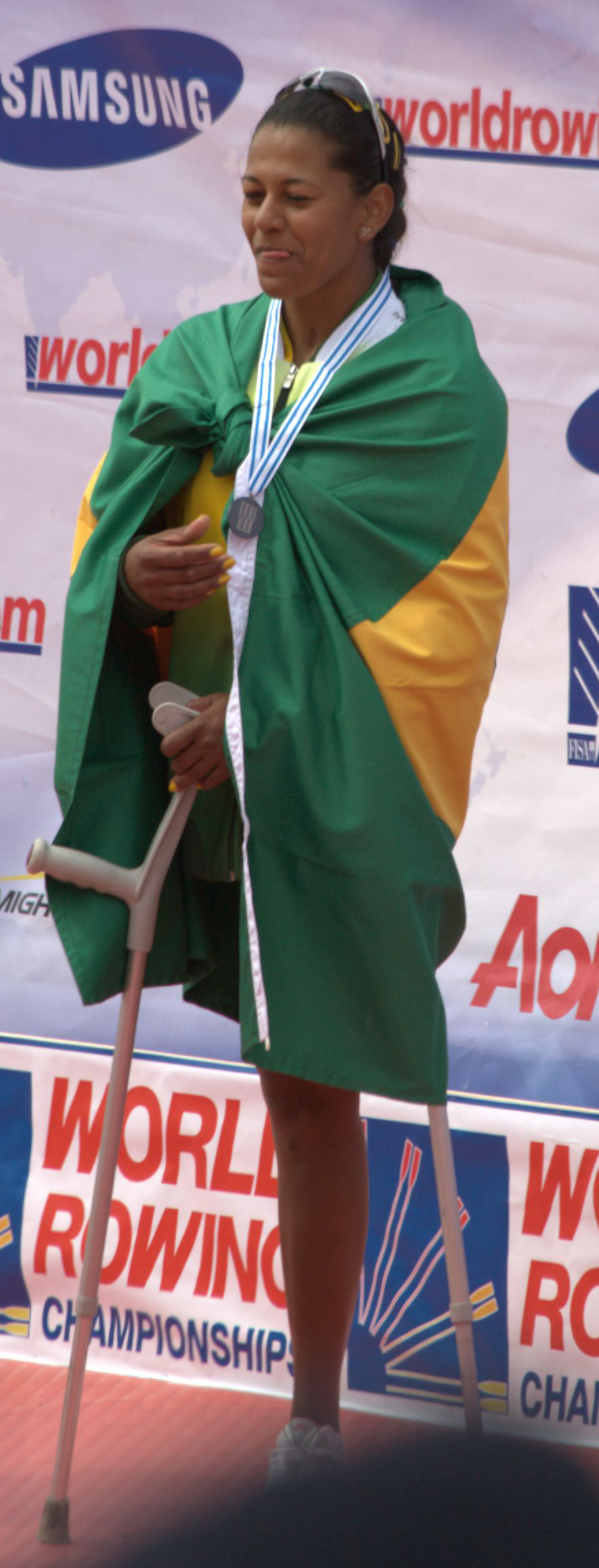
- Santos at 2010 World Rowing Championships

Personal information
- Full name: Cláudia Cícero dos Santos Sabino
- Born: 4 August 1977 (age 48) Carapicuiba, São Paulo, Brazil
- Height: 1.69 m (5 ft 7 in)
- Weight: 53 kg (117 lb)

Sport
- Country: Brazil
- Sport: Para rowing
Medal record
Para rowing
Representing Brazil
World Championships
Gold medal – first place	2007 Munich	Women's ASW1x
Silver medal – second place	2010 Karapiro	Women's ASW1x
Bronze medal – third place	2013 Chungju	Women's ASW1x

Cláudia Cícero dos Santos Sabino (born 4 August 1977) is a Brazilian adaptive rower who competes in international elite events. She is a World champion and has competed at the Paralympic Games five times.

Santos has her right leg amputated at the hip due to a car accident in 2000.
