= Wang Lili (rower) =

Chinese paralympic rower

Personal information
- Nationality: Chinese

Sport
- Sport: Rowing
Medal record
Representing China
Women's pararowing
Summer Paralympics
Silver medal – second place	2016 Rio de Janeiro	Single sculls
Asian Para Games
Gold medal – first place	2022 Hangzhou	Single sculls

Wang Lili is a Chinese paralympic rower. She won a silver medal in the women's single sculls event at the 2016 Summer Paralympics with a time of 5:16.65.
