= America Goalball Championships =

Regional goalball tournament

- Highest governing body: International Blind Sports Federation

Characteristics
- Contact: None
- Mixed-sex: No
- Type: Team sport; ball game; parasport
- Equipment: Goalball, eyeshades

Presence
- Country or region: Americas

IBSA America Regional Goalball Championships (also called Pan-American championships) is one of the four competition regions used for World Championships and Paralympic Games qualification for goalball, a team sport for athletes with a vision impairment. Conducted under the rules of the International Blind Sports Federation (IBSA), the other regions are Africa, Asia-Pacific, and Europe. The region includes the countries within South, Central, and North America.

== Hostings ==
=== 2005 São Paulo ===
The 2005 IBSA Goalball Americas Regional Championships was part of the Fourth IBSA Pan-American Games, the competition being from Monday 5 September 2005 to Friday 9 September 2005, in São Paulo, Brazil. There were five men's and three women's teams.

There were five men's teams: Argentina, Brazil, Canada, Mexico, and USA. Canada finished first, USA second, Mexico third.

There were three women's teams competing: Brazil, Canada, and USA. The United States finished first, with Brazil second, and Canada third.

=== 2011 Guadalajara ===
The 2011 Parapan American Games was from 13 to 19 November 2011, at the San Rafael Gymnasium in Guadalajara, Mexico.

There were six men's teams: Argentina, Brazil, Canada, El Salvador, Mexico, USA. Brazil came first, USA second, and Mexico third.

There were five women's teams: Brazil, Canada, El Salvador, Mexico, USA. USA came first, Brazil second, and Canada third.

=== 2013 Colorado Springs ===
The 2013 Parapan American Games (which also hosted the 2013 IBSA World Youth Championships) was from 11 to 14 July 2013, at Colorado Springs, Colorado, USA.

There were six men's teams: Argentina, Brazil, Canada, Puerto Rico, USA, Venezuela. USA came first, Brazil second, and Canada third.

There were three women's teams: Brazil, Canada, USA. USA came first, Brazil second, and Canada third.

=== 2015 Toronto ===
The 2015 Parapan American Games was from 8 August 2015 to 15 August 2015, at the Mississauga Sports Centre, Toronto, Ontario, Canada.

There were six men's teams: Argentina, Brazil, Canada, Puerto Rico, USA, Venezuela. Brazil came first, USA second, and Canada third.

There were six women's teams: Brazil, Canada, El Salvador, Guatemala, Nicaragua, USA. Brazil came first, USA second, and Canada third.

=== 2017 São Paulo ===
The 2017 IBSA Goalball Americas Championships was from Wednesday 29 November 2017 to Sunday 3 December 2017, at São Paulo, Brazil.

There were eight men's teams: Argentina, Brazil, Canada, Costa Rica, Mexico, Peru, USA, and Venezuela (Costa Rica were disqualified for not having the minimum number of athletes to start a game). Brazil came first, USA second, and Canada third.

There were six women's teams: Brazil, Canada, Costa Rica, Mexico, Peru, USA. Canada came first, Brazil second, and USA third.

=== 2019 Lima ===
The 2019 Parapan American Games was from 23 August 2019 to 1 September 2019, at the Miguel Grau Coliseum, Lima, Peru. This championships was a qualifier for the 2020 Paralympic Games.

There were eight men's teams: Argentina, Brazil, Canada, Guatemala, Mexico, Peru, USA, Venezuela. Brazil came first, USA second, and Canada third.

There were six women's teams: Brazil, Canada, Costa Rica, Mexico, Peru, USA. Brazil came first, USA second, and Canada third.

=== 2022 São Paulo ===
Due to the ongoing COVID-19 pandemic, the IBSA America championship moved from 6 to 13 November 2021, to 18 to 22 February 2022. The event was held at the Centro de Treinamento Paralímpico (Paralympic Training Center) in São Paulo. This championships was a qualifier for the 2022 Goalball World Championships.

There were thirteen men's teams: Argentina, Brazil, Canada, Chile, Colombia, Costa Rica, Guatemala, Mexico, Nicaragua, Peru, Puerto Rico, USA, Venezuela. Brazil came first, USA second, and Canada third.

There were twelve women's teams: Argentina, Brazil, Canada, Chile, Colombia, Costa Rica, Guatemala, Mexico, Nicaragua, Peru, USA, Venezuela. Brazil came first, Canada second, and USA third.

The championships also saw strong performances from other teams, including Argentina, who finished fourth in the men's competition and were praised for their performance in the women's event. The event was the biggest-ever regional championship in the region with a record 13 men's and 12 women's teams.

=== 2025 São Paulo ===
The IBSA America championships were held at the Centro de Treinamento Paralímpico (Paralympic Training Center), São Paulo, Brazil, from Saturday 26 July 2025 to Wednesday 6 August 2025. This championships was a qualifier for the 2026 Goalball World Championships.

There were thirteen men's teams: Argentina, Brazil, Canada, Chile, Colombia, Guatemala, Mexico, Nicaragua, Panama, Peru, Puerto Rico, USA, Venezuela. Brazil came first, Argentina second, and USA third.

There were twelve men's teams: Argentina, Brazil, Canada, Chile, Colombia, Guatemala, Mexico, Nicaragua, Panama, Peru, USA, Venezuela. Brazil was first, Canada second, and USA third.

== Medals (2005–2022) ==
This table include Parapan American Games.

Rank	Nation	Gold	Silver	Bronze	Total
1	Brazil (BRA)	8	5	0	13
2	United States (USA)	4	8	2	14
3	Canada (CAN)	2	1	10	13
4	Mexico (MEX)	0	0	2	2
Totals (4 entries)		14	14	14	42

== See also ==
- Goalball World Championships
- Goalball at the Summer Paralympics
- Goalball at the IBSA World Games
