= Puerto Rico men's national goalball team =

Puerto Rican national team, for the Paralympic sport of goalball

- Sport: Goalball
- League: IBSA
- Division: Men
- Region: IBSA America
- Location: Puerto Rico
- Colours: Red, blue
- Head coach: Wellington De Luna
- Championships: Paralympic Games medals: : 0: 0: 0 World Championship medals: : 0: 0: 0
- Parent group: Puerto Rico Blind Sports Federation

Puerto Rico men's national goalball team is the men's national team of Puerto Rico. Goalball is a team sport designed specifically for athletes with a vision impairment. The team takes part in international competitions.

== IBSA World Games ==
=== 2007 São Paulo ===
The team competed in the 2007 IBSA World Games, from 28 July 2007 to 8 August 2007, in São Paulo, Brazil. There were twenty-three men's and twelve women's teams. Athletes included Aneury Baez, Willian Fratti Chelli, and Nestor Afonso.

The team were in Group E finishing last: first being mercied by Spain 11:1, followed by Argentina 11:1, Algeria 10:0, Italy 10:0, and Turkey 11:1.

== Regional championships ==
The team competes in the IBSA America goalball region. The winner of the championships usually qualifies for a berth at the World Championships or the Paralympic Games.

=== 2013 Colorado Springs ===
The team competed at the 2013 Parapan American Games (which also hosted the 2013 IBSA World Youth Championships) from 11 to 14 July 2013, at Colorado Springs, Colorado, USA.

There were six men's teams: Argentina, Brazil, Canada, Puerto Rico, USA, Venezuela.

Puerto Rico came fifth, ahead of Venezuela.

=== 2015 Toronto ===
The team competed at the 2015 Parapan American Games from 8 August 2015 to 15 August 2015, at the Mississauga Sports Centre, Toronto, Ontario, Canada.

There were six men's teams: Argentina, Brazil, Canada, Puerto Rico, USA, Venezuela.

The team did not make the top four positions.

=== 2022 São Paulo ===
Due to the ongoing COVID-19 pandemic, the IBSA America championship moved from 6 to 13 November 2021, to 18 to 22 February 2022. The event is being held at the Centro de Treinamento Paralímpico (Paralympic Training Center) in São Paulo. This championships is a qualifier for the 2022 World Championships.

There are thirteen men's teams: Argentina, Brazil, Canada, Chile, Colombia, Costa Rica, Guatemala, Mexico, Nicaragua, Peru, Puerto Rico, USA, Venezuela. The team is in Pool B, first playing against USA.

== Other competitions ==
Puerto Rico attended the Vancouver Goalball Grand Slam, in March 2018, in Vancouver, British Columbia, Canada, using the competition name 'Pirates of the Caribbean'. They placed last of five teams in Pool A. Coached by Pedro Alvarado, the team was #1 William Fratichelli Hernandez, #2 Felipe Flores Lopez, #4 Nestor Alonso Vega, #6 John Perez Rivera, and #7 Eric Rivera Gonzales.

The team attended the Locomotion Tournament, Los Angeles, California in 2019, finishing fifth of ten clubs, against clubs from Mexico and USA. Athletes were under national coach Wellington De Luna.

== See also ==
- Disabled sports
- Puerto Rico at the Paralympics
