= Goalball at the 2020 Summer Paralympics – Men's tournament =

Men's goalball at the XVI Paralympic Games
- Venue: Makuhari Messe
- Dates: 25 August – 3 September 2021
- Competitors: 58 from 10 nations
- Teams: 10

Medalists
| 1st place, gold medalist(s) | | Brazil |
| 2nd place, silver medalist(s) | | China |
| 3rd place, bronze medalist(s) | | Lithuania |

The goalball men's tournament was contested from 25 August to 3 September. There were ten teams consisting of six players split into two groups: Group A and Group B.

Defending Paralympic champions Lithuania failed to defend the title after a semi-final defeat to eventual champions Brazil, they ended up with bronze medal.

== Participating teams ==
Group A

- Algeria
- Brazil
- Japan
- Lithuania
- United States

Group B

- Belgium
- China
- Germany
- Turkey
- Ukraine

== Preliminary rounds ==
=== Group A ===
| Pos | Team | Pld | W | D | L | GF | GA | GD | Pts | Qualification |
|---|---|---|---|---|---|---|---|---|---|---|
| 1 | Japan (H) | 4 | 3 | 0 | 1 | 37 | 15 | +22 | 9 | Quarter-finals |
| 2 | Brazil | 4 | 3 | 0 | 1 | 35 | 17 | +18 | 9 | Quarter-finals |
| 3 | United States | 4 | 2 | 0 | 2 | 25 | 35 | −10 | 6 | Quarter-finals |
| 4 | Lithuania | 4 | 1 | 1 | 2 | 24 | 31 | −7 | 4 | Quarter-finals |
| 5 | Algeria | 4 | 0 | 1 | 3 | 20 | 43 | −23 | 1 | |

Source: TOCOG
(H) Hosts

| 25 August 2021; 09:00 | Brazil | 11–2 | Lithuania | Makuhari Messe, Tokyo; Referees: Robert Avery (Great Britain), Warrick Jackes (Australia) |
| 25 August 2021; 09:00 | Marques 4 Moreno 3 Sousa 3 Da Silva 1 | Report | Pavliukianec 1 Zibolis 1 | Makuhari Messe, Tokyo; Referees: Robert Avery (Great Britain), Warrick Jackes (Australia) |

| 25 August 2021; 13:15 | Algeria | 4–13 | Japan | Makuhari Messe, Tokyo; Referees: Bas Spaans (Netherlands), Woradet Kultawongwattana (Thailand) |
| 25 August 2021; 13:15 | Belhouchat 3 Larbi 1 | Report | Kaneko 7 Miyajiki 3 Sano 2 Yamaguchi 1 | Makuhari Messe, Tokyo; Referees: Bas Spaans (Netherlands), Woradet Kultawongwattana (Thailand) |

| 26 August 2021; 13:15 | United States | 8–6 | Brazil | Makuhari Messe, Tokyo; Referees: Reza Dehghan (Iran), Robert Avery (Great Britain) |
| 26 August 2021; 13:15 | Young 4 Merren 1 Simpson 1 Walker 1 Sousa 1 (o.g.) | Report | Moreno 3 Sousa 2 Marques 1 | Makuhari Messe, Tokyo; Referees: Reza Dehghan (Iran), Robert Avery (Great Britain) |

| 26 August 2021; 19:00 | Lithuania | 7–7 | Algeria | Makuhari Messe, Tokyo; Referees: Warrick Jackes (Australia), Svitlana Moroz (Ukraine) |
| 26 August 2021; 19:00 | Pavliukianec 3 Pazarauskas 3 Zibolis 1 | Report | Belhouchat 7 | Makuhari Messe, Tokyo; Referees: Warrick Jackes (Australia), Svitlana Moroz (Ukraine) |

| 27 August 2021; 13:15 | Japan | 11–1 | United States | Makuhari Messe, Tokyo; Referees: Reza Dehghan (Iran), Woradet Kultawongwattana (Thailand) |
| 27 August 2021; 13:15 | Sano 6 Miyajiki 3 Kaneko 2 | Report | Walker 1 | Makuhari Messe, Tokyo; Referees: Reza Dehghan (Iran), Woradet Kultawongwattana (Thailand) |

| 27 August 2021; 20:30 | Brazil | 10–4 | Algeria | Makuhari Messe, Tokyo; Referees: Robert Avery (Great Britain), Raquel Gomez Aguado (Spain) |
| 27 August 2021; 20:30 | Moreno 5 Sousa 4 De Melo 1 | Report | Belhouchat 4 | Makuhari Messe, Tokyo; Referees: Robert Avery (Great Britain), Raquel Gomez Aguado (Spain) |

| 28 August 2021; 14:45 | Lithuania | 2–10 | Japan | Makuhari Messe, Tokyo; Referees: Warrick Jackes (Australia), Bas Spaans (Netherlands) |
| 28 August 2021; 14:45 | Montvydas 1 Pavliukianec 1 | Report | Sano 4 Miyajiki 3 Kaneko 2 Yamaguchi 1 | Makuhari Messe, Tokyo; Referees: Warrick Jackes (Australia), Bas Spaans (Netherlands) |

| 29 August 2021; 09:00 | Japan | 3–8 | Brazil | Makuhari Messe, Tokyo; Referees: Reza Dehghan (Iran), Launel Scott (Canada) |
| 29 August 2021; 09:00 | Yamaguchi 2 Sano 1 | Report | Sousa 5 Moreno 3 | Makuhari Messe, Tokyo; Referees: Reza Dehghan (Iran), Launel Scott (Canada) |

| 29 August 2021; 17:30 | Algeria | 5–13 | United States | Makuhari Messe, Tokyo; Referees: Romualdas Vaitiekus (Lithuania), Warrick Jackes (Australia) |
| 29 August 2021; 17:30 | Belhouchat 4 Larbi 1 | Report | Young 8 Simpson 3 Walker 2 | Makuhari Messe, Tokyo; Referees: Romualdas Vaitiekus (Lithuania), Warrick Jackes (Australia) |

| 30 August 2021; 13:15 | United States | 3–13 | Lithuania | Makuhari Messe, Tokyo; Referees: Robert Avery (Great Britain), Bas Spaans (Netherlands) |
| 30 August 2021; 13:15 | Simpson 2 Young 1 | Report | Montvydas 5 Zibolis 4 Pavliukianec 2 Pazarauskas 2 | Makuhari Messe, Tokyo; Referees: Robert Avery (Great Britain), Bas Spaans (Netherlands) |

=== Group B ===
| Pos | Team | Pld | W | D | L | GF | GA | GD | Pts | Qualification |
|---|---|---|---|---|---|---|---|---|---|---|
| 1 | Belgium | 4 | 2 | 0 | 2 | 18 | 13 | +5 | 6 | Quarter-finals |
| 2 | Ukraine | 4 | 2 | 0 | 2 | 18 | 15 | +3 | 6 | Quarter-finals |
| 3 | Turkey | 4 | 2 | 0 | 2 | 15 | 15 | 0 | 6 | Quarter-finals |
| 4 | China | 4 | 2 | 0 | 2 | 21 | 22 | −1 | 6 | Quarter-finals |
| 5 | Germany | 4 | 2 | 0 | 2 | 16 | 23 | −7 | 6 | |

Source: TOCOG

| 25 August 2021; 17:30 | Germany | 6–4 | Turkey | Makuhari Messe, Tokyo; Referees: Romualdas Vaitiekus (Lithuania), Reza Dehghan (Iran) |
| 25 August 2021; 17:30 | Dennis 4 Hörauf 1 Steiger 1 | Report | Karakaya 3 Gündoğdu 1 | Makuhari Messe, Tokyo; Referees: Romualdas Vaitiekus (Lithuania), Reza Dehghan (Iran) |

| 26 August 2021; 09:00 | Belgium | 10−3 | China | Makuhari Messe, Tokyo; Referees: Woradet Kultawongwattana (Thailand), Bas Spaans (Netherlands) |
| 26 August 2021; 09:00 | Mapreni 8 T. Vanhove 1 Amnir 1 | Report | Yang Mingyuan 1 Hu Mingyao 1 Lai Liangyu 1 | Makuhari Messe, Tokyo; Referees: Woradet Kultawongwattana (Thailand), Bas Spaans (Netherlands) |

| 26 August 2021; 17:30 | Ukraine | 11–5 | Germany | Makuhari Messe, Tokyo; Referees: Yoshinori Nii (Japan), Vaida Pokvytytė (Lithuania) |
| 26 August 2021; 17:30 | Zhyhalin 7 Oliinyk 4 | Report | Dennis 3 Rogge 2 | Makuhari Messe, Tokyo; Referees: Yoshinori Nii (Japan), Vaida Pokvytytė (Lithuania) |

| 27 August 2021; 09:00 | Turkey | 4–6 | Belgium | Makuhari Messe, Tokyo; Referees: Yoshinori Nii (Japan), Robert Avery (Great Britain) |
| 27 August 2021; 09:00 | Karakaya 3 Gündoğdu 1 | Report | B. Vanhove 3 Mapreni 2 T. Vanhove 1 | Makuhari Messe, Tokyo; Referees: Yoshinori Nii (Japan), Robert Avery (Great Britain) |

| 27 August 2021; 17:30 | China | 7–3 | Ukraine | Makuhari Messe, Tokyo; Referees: Romualdas Vaitiekus (Lithuania), Warrick Jackes (Australia) |
| 27 August 2021; 17:30 | Chen Liangliang 3 Cai Changgui 2 Yang Mingyuan 2 | Report | Zhyhalin 2 Oliinyk 1 | Makuhari Messe, Tokyo; Referees: Romualdas Vaitiekus (Lithuania), Warrick Jackes (Australia) |

| 28 August 2021; 10:30 | Turkey | 6–3 | China | Makuhari Messe, Tokyo; Referees: Svitlana Moroz (Ukraine), Yoshinori Nii (Japan) |
| 28 August 2021; 10:30 | Kara 3 Karakaya 3 | Report | Yang Mingyuan 2 Cai Changgui 1 | Makuhari Messe, Tokyo; Referees: Svitlana Moroz (Ukraine), Yoshinori Nii (Japan) |

| 28 August 2021; 19:00 | Germany | 2–0 | Belgium | Makuhari Messe, Tokyo; Referees: Raquel Gomez Aguado (Spain), Vaida Pokvytytė (Lithuania) |
| 28 August 2021; 19:00 | Dennis 2 | Report | | Makuhari Messe, Tokyo; Referees: Raquel Gomez Aguado (Spain), Vaida Pokvytytė (Lithuania) |

| 29 August 2021; 13:15 | Belgium | 2–4 | Ukraine | Makuhari Messe, Tokyo; Referees: Yoshinori Nii (Japan), Robert Avery (Great Britain) |
| 29 August 2021; 13:15 | Mapreni 2 | Report | Oliinyk 2 Zhyhalin 2 | Makuhari Messe, Tokyo; Referees: Yoshinori Nii (Japan), Robert Avery (Great Britain) |

| 30 August 2021; 09:00 | Ukraine | 0–1 | Turkey | Makuhari Messe, Tokyo; Referees: Warrick Jackes (Australia), Yoshinori Nii (Japan) |
| 30 August 2021; 09:00 | | Report | Karakaya 1 | Makuhari Messe, Tokyo; Referees: Warrick Jackes (Australia), Yoshinori Nii (Japan) |

| 30 August 2021; 17:30 | China | 8–3 | Germany | Makuhari Messe, Tokyo; Referees: Reza Dehghan (Iran), Romualdas Vaitiekus (Lithuania) |
| 30 August 2021; 17:30 | Yang Mingyuan 7 Hu Mingyao 1 | Report | Dennis 2 Tiede 1 | Makuhari Messe, Tokyo; Referees: Reza Dehghan (Iran), Romualdas Vaitiekus (Lithuania) |

== Knockout stage ==
=== Bracket ===
Quarter-finals
31 August
Japan | 4
China | 7
31 August
Ukraine | 4
United States | 5
31 August
Belgium | 4
Lithuania | 7
31 August
Brazil | 9
Turkey | 4

Semi-finals
2 September
China | 8
United States | 1
2 September
Lithuania | 5
Brazil | 9

Gold medal match
3 September
China | 2
Brazil | 7
Bronze medal match
3 September
United States | 7
Lithuania | 10

=== Quarter-finals ===
| 31 August 2021; 13:15 | Japan | 4–7 | China | Makuhari Messe, Tokyo; Referees: Reza Dehghan (Iran), Svitlana Moroz (Ukraine) |
| 31 August 2021; 13:15 | Miyajiki 4 | Report | Yang Mingyuan 6 Cai Changgui 1 | Makuhari Messe, Tokyo; Referees: Reza Dehghan (Iran), Svitlana Moroz (Ukraine) |

| 31 August 2021; 15:00 | Ukraine | 4–5 | United States | Makuhari Messe, Tokyo; Referees: Warrick Jackes (Australia), Vaida Pokvytytė (LTU) |
| 31 August 2021; 15:00 | Oliinyk 3 Zhyhalin 1 | Report | Young 4 Simpson 1 | Makuhari Messe, Tokyo; Referees: Warrick Jackes (Australia), Vaida Pokvytytė (LTU) |

| 31 August 2021; 17:45 | Belgium | 4–7 | Lithuania | Makuhari Messe, Tokyo; Referees: Bas Spaans (Netherlands), Raili Sipura (FIN) |
| 31 August 2021; 17:45 | T. Vanhove 3 Amnir 1 | Report | Pavliukianec 4 Montvydas 2 Pazarauskas 1 | Makuhari Messe, Tokyo; Referees: Bas Spaans (Netherlands), Raili Sipura (FIN) |

| 31 August 2021; 19:30 | Brazil | 9–4 | Turkey | Makuhari Messe, Tokyo; Referees: Yoshinori Nii (Japan), Romualdas Vaitiekus (Lithuania) |
| 31 August 2021; 19:30 | Moreno 6 Sousa 3 | Report | Gündoğdu 4 | Makuhari Messe, Tokyo; Referees: Yoshinori Nii (Japan), Romualdas Vaitiekus (Lithuania) |

=== Semi-finals ===
| 2 September 2021; 13:15 | China | 8–1 | United States | Makuhari Messe, Tokyo; Referees: Bas Spaans (Netherlands), Raquel Gomez Aguado (Spain) |
| 2 September 2021; 13:15 | Yang Mingyuan 6 Hu Mingyao 2 | Report | Young 1 | Makuhari Messe, Tokyo; Referees: Bas Spaans (Netherlands), Raquel Gomez Aguado (Spain) |

| 2 September 2021; 17:45 | Lithuania | 5–9 | Brazil | Makuhari Messe, Tokyo; Referees: Yoshinori Nii (Japan), Warrick Jackes (Australia) |
| 2 September 2021; 17:45 | Pavliukianec 2 Jonikaitis 1 Pažarauskas 1 Zibolis 1 | Report | Sousa 6 Moreno 2 Marques 1 | Makuhari Messe, Tokyo; Referees: Yoshinori Nii (Japan), Warrick Jackes (Australia) |

=== Bronze medal match ===
| 3 September 2021; 15:00 | United States | 7–10 | Lithuania | Makuhari Messe, Tokyo; Referees: Robert Avery (Great Britain), Warrick Jackes (Australia) |
| 3 September 2021; 15:00 | Simpson 2 Walker 2 Young 2 Kusku 1 | Report | Zibolis 4 Pavliukianec 3 Montvydas 2 Pažarauskas 1 | Makuhari Messe, Tokyo; Referees: Robert Avery (Great Britain), Warrick Jackes (Australia) |

=== Gold medal match ===
| 3 September 2021; 19:30 | China | 2–7 | Brazil | Makuhari Messe, Tokyo; Referees: Yoshinori Nii (Japan), Romualdas Vaitiekus (Lithuania) |
| 3 September 2021; 19:30 | Yang Mingyuan 2 | Report | Moreno 3 Sousa 3 Marques 1 | Makuhari Messe, Tokyo; Referees: Yoshinori Nii (Japan), Romualdas Vaitiekus (Lithuania) |
