= Peru men's national goalball team =

Peruvian national team, for the Paralympic sport of goalball

- Sport: Goalball
- League: IBSA
- Division: Men
- Region: IBSA America
- Location: Peru
- Colours: Red, white
- Championships: Paralympic Games medals: : 0: 0: 0 World Championship medals: : 0: 0: 0
- Parent group: Asociacion Nacional Paralimpica del Peru (National Paralympic Association of Peru)

Peru men's national goalball team is the men's national team of Peru. Goalball is a team sport designed specifically for athletes with a vision impairment. The team takes part in international competitions.

== Regional championships ==
The team competes in the IBSA America goalball region. The winner of the championships usually qualifies for a berth at the World Championships or the Paralympic Games.

=== 2017 São Paulo ===
The team competed at the 2017 IBSA Goalball Americas Championships from Wednesday 29 November 2017 to Sunday 3 December 2017, at São Paulo, Brazil. There were eight men's teams: Argentina, Brazil, Canada, Costa Rica, Mexico, Peru, USA, and Venezuela (Costa Rica were disqualified for not having the minimum number of athletes to start a game).

Peru came last.

=== 2019 Lima ===
The team competed at the 2019 Parapan American Games from 23 August 2019 to 1 September 2019, at the Miguel Grau Coliseum, Lima, Peru. This championships was a qualifier for the 2020 Paralympic Games. There were eight men's teams: Argentina, Brazil, Canada, Guatemala, Mexico, Peru, USA, Venezuela. The team was composed of Hector Enrique Herrera, Juan Oscar Julca, Luis Jhorman Obando, Jorge Luis Perez, Crowder Augusto Pezo, and John Quispe, with coaches Daniel Aparicio Olivo and Luis A. Cabanillas Salinas.

The team was mercied by all teams: Venezuela (11:1), Canada (11:1), USA (13:3), and in the quarter-finals with Brazil (11:1).

=== 2022 São Paulo ===
Due to the ongoing COVID-19 pandemic, the IBSA America championship moved from 6 to 13 November 2021, to 18 to 22 February 2022. The event is being held at the Centro de Treinamento Paralímpico (Paralympic Training Center) in São Paulo. This championships is a qualifier for the 2022 World Championships.

There are thirteen men's teams: Argentina, Brazil, Canada, Chile, Colombia, Costa Rica, Guatemala, Mexico, Nicaragua, Peru, Puerto Rico, USA, Venezuela.

Coach Luis Cabanillas selected a team of Héctor Herrera, Jorge Pérez, Juan Julca Pérez, Jhon Quispe, and Rothman Ramírez.

== Other competitions ==
In preparation for the 2019 Parapan American Games, and regional championships, Lima saw the first goalball international tournament on Saturday 20 to Sunday 21 May 2017. Participating male and female teams included Colombia and Ecuador.

== See also ==
- Disabled sports
- Peru women's national goalball team
- Peru at the Paralympics
