= Venezuela men's national goalball team =

Venezuela national team, for the Paralympic sport of goalball

Selección Venezolana de Goalball
- Sport: Goalball
- League: IBSA
- Division: Men
- Region: IBSA America
- Location: Venezuela
- Colours: Dark blue, white
- Championships: Paralympic Games medals: : 0: 0: 0 World Championship medals: : 0: 0: 0
- Parent group: Federación Polideportiva de Ciegos de Venezuela (Sports Federation for the Blind of Venezuela)

Venezuela men's national goalball team is the men's national team of Venezuela. Goalball is a team sport designed specifically for athletes with a vision impairment. The team takes part in international competitions.

The country has held the occasional national championship for the sport.

== IBSA World Games ==
=== 2007 São Paulo ===
The team competed in the 2007 IBSA World Games, from 28 July 2007 to 8 August 2007, in São Paulo, Brazil. There were twenty-three men's and twelve women's teams.

The team competed in Group D with six teams. The team was mercied by Brazil 10:0, by Czechoslovakia 13:3, by Germany 11:1, by Japan 10:0, and by Belgium 13:3.

== Regional championships ==
The team competes in the IBSA America goalball region. The winner of the championships usually qualifies for a berth at the World Championships or the Paralympic Games.

=== 2013 Colorado Springs ===
The team competed at the 2013 Parapan American Games (which also hosted the 2013 IBSA World Youth Championships) from 11 to 14 July 2013, at Colorado Springs, Colorado, United States. There were six men's teams: Argentina, Brazil, Canada, Puerto Rico, the United States, and Venezuela.

The team came last.

=== 2015 Toronto ===
The team competed at the 2015 Parapan American Games from 8 August 2015 to 15 August 2015, at the Mississauga Sports Centre, Toronto, Ontario, Canada. There were six men's teams: Argentina, Brazil, Canada, Puerto Rico, the United States, and Venezuela.

The team did not place in the first four spots.

=== 2017 São Paulo ===
The team competed at the 2017 IBSA Goalball Americas Championships from Wednesday 29 November 2017 to Sunday 3 December 2017, at São Paulo, Brazil. There were eight men's teams: Argentina, Brazil, Canada, Costa Rica, Mexico, Peru, the United States, and Venezuela (Costa Rica were disqualified for not having the minimum number of athletes to start a game).

Venezuela placed second-last, ahead of Peru.

=== 2019 Lima ===
The team competed at the 2019 Parapan American Games from 23 August 2019 to 1 September 2019, at the Miguel Grau Coliseum, Lima, Peru. This championships was a qualifier for the 2020 Paralympic Games. There were eight men's teams: Argentina, Brazil, Canada, Guatemala, Mexico, Peru, the United States, and Venezuela. The athletes were Juan Cegarra, Fernando Ferrer, Carlos Linarez, Christhian Lopez, Jhonathan Rivas, and Wilmer Zambrano.

The team took fourth place, losing to Canada, 11:13.

=== 2022 São Paulo ===
Due to the ongoing COVID-19 pandemic, the IBSA America championship moved from 6 to 13 November 2021, to 18 to 22 February 2022. The event is being held at the Centro de Treinamento Paralímpico (Paralympic Training Center) in São Paulo. This championships is a qualifier for the 2022 World Championships.

There are thirteen men's teams: Argentina, Brazil, Canada, Chile, Colombia, Costa Rica, Guatemala, Mexico, Nicaragua, Peru, Puerto Rico, the United States, and Venezuela.

== See also ==
- Disabled sports
- Venezuela at the Paralympics
