= Brazil men's national goalball team =

Brazilian national team, for the Paralympic sport of goalball

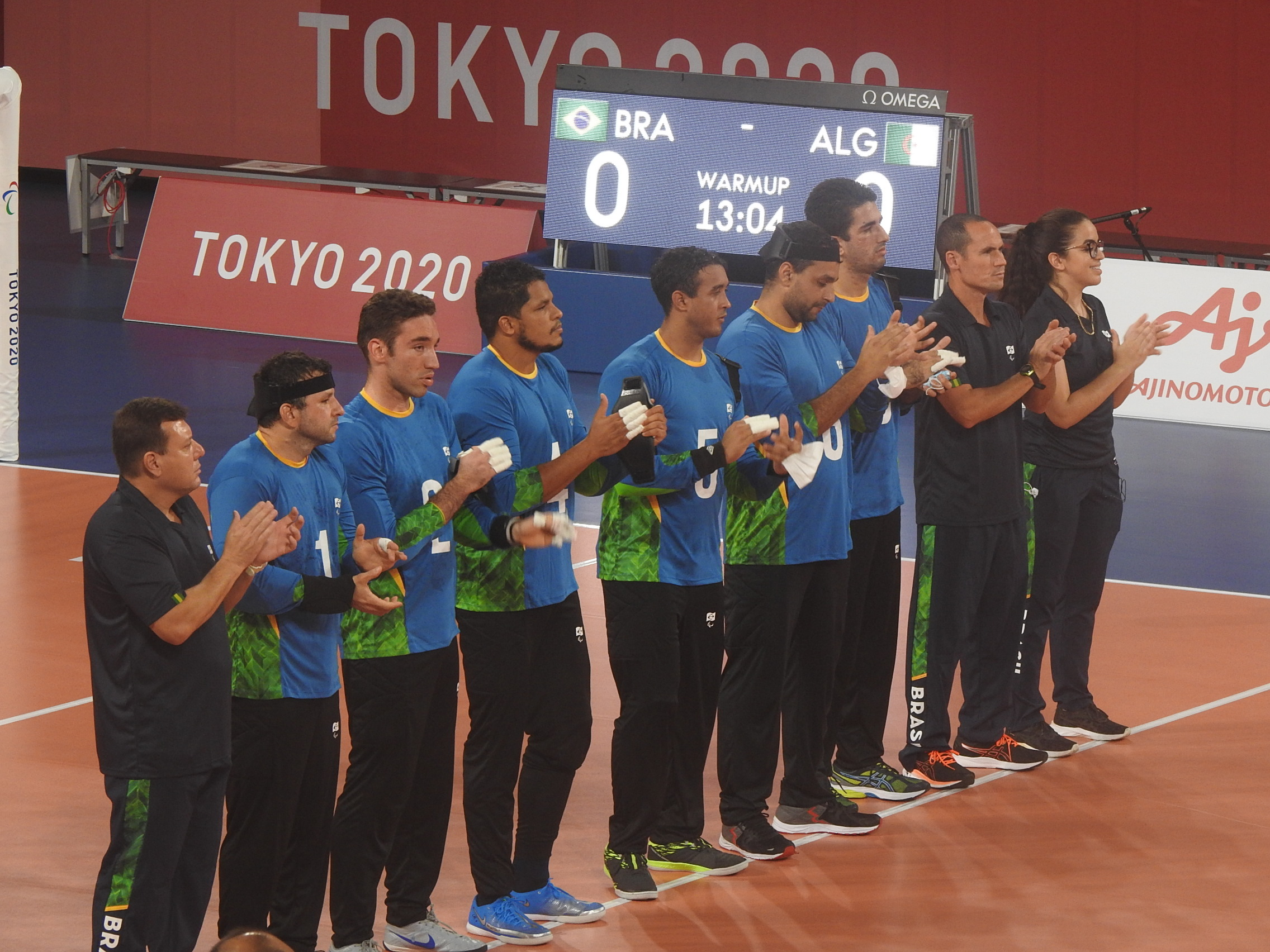
- Brazil men's goalball team. Makuhari Messe arena, 2020 Paralympic Games, Chiba, Tokyo, Japan (Aug 2021).
- Sport: Goalball
- League: IBSA
- Division: Men
- Region: IBSA America
- Location: Brazil
- Colours: Green, yellow, blue
- Championships: Paralympic Games medals: : 1: 1: 2 World Championship medals: : 3:0:1

Brazil men's national goalball team is the men's national team of Brazil. Goalball is a team sport designed specifically for athletes with a vision impairment. The team takes part in international competitions.

== Paralympic Games ==
=== 2008 Beijing ===
The team competed at the 2008 Summer Paralympics, from 6 to 17 September 2008, in the Beijing Institute of Technology Gymnasium 'bat wing' arena, Beijing, China. There were twelve men's and eight women's teams. Athletes were Alexsander Celente, Thiago Costa, Legy Freire, Paulo Homem, Romario Marques, and Luiz Silva Filho.

Brazil placed 11th ahead of Spain.

=== 2012 London ===
The team competed in the 2012 Summer Paralympics from 30 August to 7 September 2012, in the Copper Box Arena, London, England. There were twelve men's teams.

The following is the Brazil roster in the men's goalball tournament of the 2012 Summer Paralympics.

No.	Player	Age
1	José Roberto Ferreira de Oliveira	31
3	Alexsander Almeida Maciel Celente	31
4	Leomon Moreno da Silva	19
6	Romário Diego Marques	23
7	Filippe Santos Silvestre	30
9	Leandro Moreno da Silva	24

Round-robin

Team	Pld	W	D	L	GF	GA	GD	Pts	Qualification
Turkey	5	4	1	0	26	6	+20	13	Quarterfinals
Brazil	5	3	0	2	30	20	+10	9	Quarterfinals
Lithuania	5	2	2	1	33	20	+13	8	Quarterfinals
Finland	5	2	0	3	16	24	−8	6	Quarterfinals
Sweden	5	1	2	2	16	25	−9	5	Eliminated
Great Britain	5	0	1	4	9	35	−26	1	Eliminated

Source: "London 2012 Paralympic Games - Goalball results" (PDF). Paralympic.org. 3 October 2012 – via Goalball.sport.

30 August 2012; 10:15	Finland	5 – 6	Brazil	Copper Box, London; Referees: Launel Scott (CAN), Thomas Baerz (GER)
30 August 2012; 10:15	Alenius 3 Mattila 1 Minala 1	Report	Marques 4 Silvestre 2	Copper Box, London; Referees: Launel Scott (CAN), Thomas Baerz (GER)

31 August 2012; 13:45	Brazil	4 – 5	Sweden	Copper Box, London; Referees: Christl Daentler (GER), Tony Connolly (USA)
31 August 2012; 13:45	Leo. Moreno da Silva 2 Marques 1 Santos Silvestre 1	Report	Hultqvist 4 Gahne 1	Copper Box, London; Referees: Christl Daentler (GER), Tony Connolly (USA)

1 September 2012; 11:30	Brazil	12 – 5	Lithuania	Copper Box, London; Referees: Thomas Baerz (GER), Launel Scott (CAN)
1 September 2012; 11:30	Marques 10; Almeida Maciel Celente 2	Report	Montvydas 2 Pavliuklianec 2 Panovas 1	Copper Box, London; Referees: Thomas Baerz (GER), Launel Scott (CAN)

2 September 2012; 21:00	Turkey	4 – 1	Brazil	Copper Box, London; Referees: Dawna Christy (CAN), Vilma Venckutonyte (LTU)
2 September 2012; 21:00	Karakaya 2 Alkan 2	Report	Marques 1	Copper Box, London; Referees: Dawna Christy (CAN), Vilma Venckutonyte (LTU)

4 September 2012; 18:30	Great Britain	1 – 7	Brazil	Copper Box, London; Referees: Janne Ahokas (FIN), Vilma Venckutonyte (LTU)
4 September 2012; 18:30	Knott 1	Report	Marques 4 Celente 2 Silvestre 1	Copper Box, London; Referees: Janne Ahokas (FIN), Vilma Venckutonyte (LTU)

Quarter-finals

5 September 2012; 19:30	Brazil	3 – 0	Belgium	Copper Box, London; Referees: Tony Connolly (USA), Vilma Venckutonyte (LTU)
5 September 2012; 19:30	Marques 2 Almeida Maciel Celente 1	Report		Copper Box, London; Referees: Tony Connolly (USA), Vilma Venckutonyte (LTU)

Semi-finals

6 September 2012; 20:00	Brazil	2 – 1	Lithuania	Copper Box, London; Referees: Janne Ahokas (FIN), Shinji Mizuno (JPN)
6 September 2012; 20:00	Almeida Maciel Celente 1 Marques 1	Report	Leonavičius 1	Copper Box, London; Referees: Janne Ahokas (FIN), Shinji Mizuno (JPN)

Gold medal match

7 September 2012; 20:00	Brazil	1 – 8	Finland	Copper Box, London; Referees: Bülent Kimyon (TUR), Tony Connolly (USA)
7 September 2012; 20:00	Leo. Moreno da Silva 1	Report	Posio 4 Mattila 3 Miinala 1	Copper Box, London; Referees: Bülent Kimyon (TUR), Tony Connolly (USA)

=== 2016 Rio de Janeiro ===
The team competed in the 2016 Summer Paralympics, with competition from Thursday 8 September to finals on Friday 16 September 2016, in the temporary Future Arena, Rio de Janeiro, Brazil. There were ten men's and ten women's teams (a decrease of two men's teams from past years).

The following is the Brazil roster in the men's goalball tournament of the 2016 Summer Paralympics.

No.	Player	Class	Date of birth (age)
1	José Roberto Oliveira	B1	2 April 1981 (aged 35)
2	Alex de Melo	B2	10 December 1994 (aged 21)
3	Alexsander Celente	B1	21 December 1980 (aged 35)
4	Leomon Moreno	B1	21 August 1993 (aged 23)
5	Josemarcio Sousa	B3	8 September 1995 (aged 21)
6	Romário Marques	B1	20 July 1989 (aged 27)

Round-robin

Pos	Team	Pld	W	D	L	GF	GA	GD	Pts	Qualification
1	Brazil (H)	4	4	0	0	42	15	+27	12	Quarter-finals
2	Sweden	4	3	0	1	33	23	+10	9	Quarter-finals
3	Germany	4	1	0	3	24	26	−2	3	Quarter-finals
4	Canada	4	1	0	3	26	39	−13	3	Quarter-finals
5	Algeria	4	1	0	3	25	47	−22	3	

Source: Paralympic.org
(H) Hosts

8 September 2016; 09:00	Brazil	9–6	Sweden	Future Arena, Rio de Janeiro; Referees: Bülent Kimyon (TUR), Patricia Fras (SLO)
8 September 2016; 09:00	Moreno 5 Sousa 2 Marques 1 Celente 1	Report	Björkstrand 5 Seremeti 1	Future Arena, Rio de Janeiro; Referees: Bülent Kimyon (TUR), Patricia Fras (SLO)

9 September 2016; 13:15	Canada	3–11	Brazil	Future Arena, Rio de Janeiro; Referees: Patricia Fras (SLO), Nejc Jakic (SLO)
9 September 2016; 13:15	Hache 2 Ripley 1	Report	Marques 4 de Melo 3 Moreno 2 Sousa 1 Celente 1	Future Arena, Rio de Janeiro; Referees: Patricia Fras (SLO), Nejc Jakic (SLO)

11 September 2016; 09:00	Brazil	12–2	Algeria	Future Arena, Rio de Janeiro; Referees: Alexander Knecht (GER), Bülent Kimyon (TUR)
11 September 2016; 09:00	Moreno 6 Marques 3 Sousa 2 Celente 1	Report	Mokrane 2	Future Arena, Rio de Janeiro; Referees: Alexander Knecht (GER), Bülent Kimyon (TUR)

13 September 2016; 10:15	Germany	4–10	Brazil	Future Arena, Rio de Janeiro; Referees: Rudi Janssen (BEL), Raili Sipura (FIN)
13 September 2016; 10:15	Feistle 2 Horauf 2	Report	Sousa 4 Moreno 2 Celente 2 de Melo 2	Future Arena, Rio de Janeiro; Referees: Rudi Janssen (BEL), Raili Sipura (FIN)

Quarter-finals

14 September 2016; 09:00	Brazil	10–3	China	Future Arena, Rio de Janeiro; Referees: Yoshinori Nii (JPN), Rudi Janssen (BEL)
14 September 2016; 09:00	Moreno 8 Sousa 2	Report	Shao 2 Yang 1	Future Arena, Rio de Janeiro; Referees: Yoshinori Nii (JPN), Rudi Janssen (BEL)

Semi-finals

15 September 2016; 13:30	Brazil	1–10	United States	Future Arena, Rio de Janeiro; Referees: Bülent Kimyon (TUR), Raili Sipura (FIN)
15 September 2016; 13:30	Marques 1	Report	Merren 9 Hamilton 1	Future Arena, Rio de Janeiro; Referees: Bülent Kimyon (TUR), Raili Sipura (FIN)

Bronze medal match

16 September 2016; 15:00	Brazil	6–5 (a.e.t.)	Sweden	Future Arena, Rio de Janeiro; Referees: Bülent Kimyon (TUR), Yoshinori Nii (JPN)
16 September 2016; 15:00	Moreno 4 Sousa 2	Report	Björkstrand 3 Seremeti 2	Future Arena, Rio de Janeiro; Referees: Bülent Kimyon (TUR), Yoshinori Nii (JPN)

=== 2020 Tokyo ===
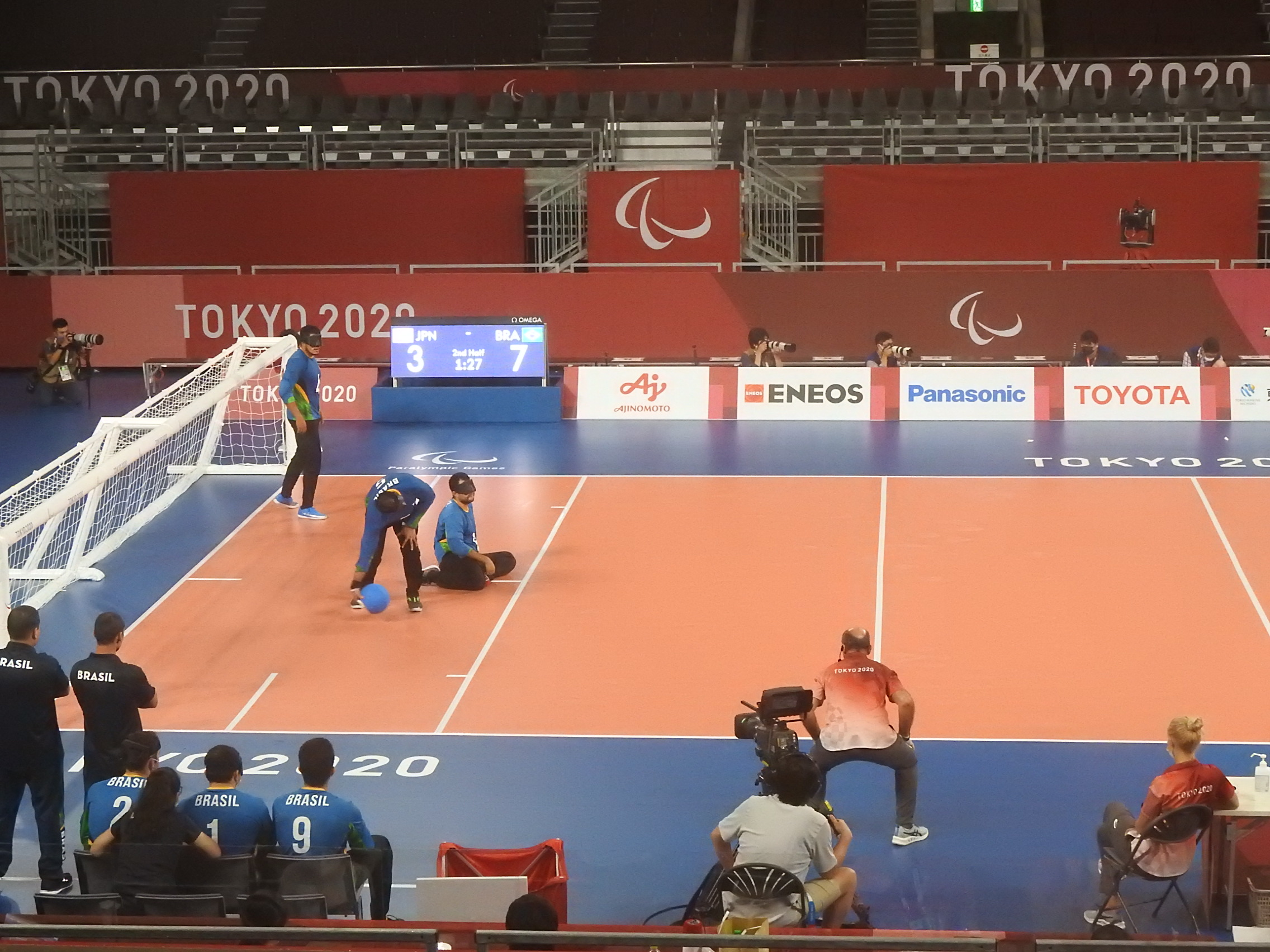
Brazil men's goalball team throwing to Japan. Makuhari Messe arena, 2020 Paralympic Games, Chiba, Tokyo, Japan (Aug 2021).

The team competed in the 2020 Summer Paralympics, with competition from Wednesday 25 August to finals on Friday 3 September 2021, in the Makuhari Messe arena, Chiba, Tokyo, Japan.

The following is the Brazil roster in the men's goalball tournament of the 2020 Summer Paralympics.

No.	Player	Class	Date of birth (age)
1	José Roberto Oliveira	B1	2 April 1981 (aged 40)
2	Alex de Melo	B2	10 December 1994 (aged 26)
4	Leomon Moreno	B1	21 August 1993 (aged 28)
5	Josemárcio Sousa	B3	8 September 1995 (aged 25)
6	Romário Marques	B1	20 July 1989 (aged 32)
9	Emerson da Silva	B3	11 February 1999 (aged 22)

Pos	Team	Pld	W	D	L	GF	GA	GD	Pts	Qualification
1	Japan (H)	4	3	0	1	37	15	+22	9	Quarter-finals
2	Brazil	4	3	0	1	35	17	+18	9	Quarter-finals
3	United States	4	2	0	2	25	35	−10	6	Quarter-finals
4	Lithuania	4	1	1	2	24	31	−7	4	Quarter-finals
5	Algeria	4	0	1	3	20	43	−23	1	

Source: TOCOG
(H) Hosts

Round-robin

25 August 2021; 09:00	Brazil	11–2	Lithuania	Makuhari Messe, Tokyo; Referees: Robert Avery (Great Britain), Warrick Jackes (Australia)
25 August 2021; 09:00	Marques 4 Moreno 3 Sousa 3 Da Silva 1	Report	Pavliukianec 1 Zibolis 1	Makuhari Messe, Tokyo; Referees: Robert Avery (Great Britain), Warrick Jackes (Australia)

26 August 2021; 13:15	United States	8–6	Brazil	Makuhari Messe, Tokyo; Referees: Reza Dehghan (Iran), Robert Avery (Great Britain)
26 August 2021; 13:15	Young 4 Merren 1 Simpson 1 Walker 1 Sousa 1 (o.g.)	Report	Moreno 3 Sousa 2 Marques 1	Makuhari Messe, Tokyo; Referees: Reza Dehghan (Iran), Robert Avery (Great Britain)

27 August 2021; 20:30	Brazil	10–4	Algeria	Makuhari Messe, Tokyo; Referees: Robert Avery (Great Britain), Raquel Gomez Aguado (Spain)
27 August 2021; 20:30	Moreno 5 Sousa 4 De Melo 1	Report	Belhouchat 4	Makuhari Messe, Tokyo; Referees: Robert Avery (Great Britain), Raquel Gomez Aguado (Spain)

29 August 2021; 09:00	Japan	3–8	Brazil	Makuhari Messe, Tokyo; Referees: Reza Dehghan (Iran), Launel Scott (Canada)
29 August 2021; 09:00	Yamaguchi 2 Sano 1	Report	Sousa 5 Moreno 3	Makuhari Messe, Tokyo; Referees: Reza Dehghan (Iran), Launel Scott (Canada)

Quarter-finals

31 August 2021; 19:30	Brazil	9–4	Turkey	Makuhari Messe, Tokyo; Referees: Yoshinori Nii (Japan), Romualdas Vaitiekus (Lithuania)
31 August 2021; 19:30	Moreno 6 Sousa 3	Report	Gündoğdu 4	Makuhari Messe, Tokyo; Referees: Yoshinori Nii (Japan), Romualdas Vaitiekus (Lithuania)

Semi-finals

2 September 2021; 17:45	Lithuania	5–9	Brazil	Makuhari Messe, Tokyo; Referees: Yoshinori Nii (Japan), Warrick Jackes (Australia)
2 September 2021; 17:45	Pavliukianec 2 Jonikaitis 1 Pažarauskas 1 Zibolis 1	Report	Sousa 6 Moreno 2 Marques 1	Makuhari Messe, Tokyo; Referees: Yoshinori Nii (Japan), Warrick Jackes (Australia)

Gold medal match

3 September 2021; 19:30	China	2–7	Brazil	Makuhari Messe, Tokyo; Referees: Yoshinori Nii (Japan), Romualdas Vaitiekus (Lithuania)
3 September 2021; 19:30	Yang Mingyuan 2	Report	Moreno 3 Sousa 3 Marques 1	Makuhari Messe, Tokyo; Referees: Yoshinori Nii (Japan), Romualdas Vaitiekus (Lithuania)

== World Championships ==
=== 2002 Rio de Janeiro ===
The team competed in the 2002 World Championships, in Rio de Janeiro, Brazil, from 30 August 2002 to 8 September 2002. There were fourteen men's and ten women's teams.

Brazil came ninth.

=== 2010 Sheffield ===
The team competed in the 2010 World Championships, from 20 to 25 June 2010, in Sheffield, England. There were sixteen men's and twelve women's teams.

Brazil came fourth behind Belgium.

=== 2014 Espoo ===
The team competed in the 2014 World Championships from 30 June to 5 July 2014, in Espoo, Finland. There were fourteen men's and ten women's teams. Athletes: Alexsander Celente (#3), Romario Marques (#6), José Roberto Oliveira (#1), Leandro Silva (#5), Leomon Silva (#4), and Alex Sousa (#2). Leomon Silva was the highest male goalscorer of the championships, with 51 goals.

They placed first in Pool B, taking the quarter-finals 11:8 with Iran, mercing Lithuania 14:4 in the semi-finals, and finishing 9:1 against Finland to take gold.

=== 2018 Malmö ===
The team competed in the 2018 World Championships from 3 to 8 June 2018, at the Baltiska Hallen, Malmö, Sweden. There were sixteen men's and twelve women's teams. Athletes included: Andre Claudio Dantas, Jose Roberto Ferreira, Romario Diego Marques, Leomon Moreno da Silva (44 goals for the championships), Alex Melo de Souza, and Josemarcio da Silva Souza.

They placed first in Pool B, beat Sweden 9:3 in the quarter-finals, 7:6 against Lithuania in the semi-finals, beating Germany 8:3 to take the gold medal.

=== 2022 Matosinhos ===
The team competed in the 2022 World Championships from 7 to 16 December 2022, at the Centro de Desportos e Congressos de Matosinhos, Portugal. There were sixteen men's and sixteen women's teams. They placed first in Pool C, winning all seven games.

Brazil were crowned world champions for the third time in a row after beating China 5–4 in the gold medal game. Brazil together with China also secured a ticket for the 2024 Summer Paralympics which will take place at the Pierre de Coubertin Stadium in Paris, France.

== IBSA World Games ==
=== 2003 Quebec City ===
The team competed in the 2003 IBSA World Games from Friday 1 to Sunday 10 August 2011, in Quebec City, Canada. Playing in Pool C, they ranked second in the round-robin of seven teams. Losing 7:4 to Canada, Brazil finished sixth.

=== 2007 São Paulo ===
The team competed in the 2007 IBSA World Games, from 28 July 2007 to 8 August 2007, in São Paulo, Brazil. There were twenty-three men's and twelve women's teams. Athletes included Alexsander Celente, Luis Filho, Freire Legy, and Romario Marques.

Playing in Group D round-robin, they beat Italy 2:1 in the quarter-finals, lost to Spain 2:5 in the semi-finals, and lost to Iran 7:8 in the bronze medal to finish fourth.

=== 2011 Antalya ===
The team competed in the 2011 IBSA World Games from 1 to 10 April 2011, in Antalya, Turkey, organised by the Turkish Blind Sports Federation. There were fifteen men's and fourteen women's teams. They placed fifth of seven teams in Group A, and came tenth to Slovenia 7:11 in the final standings.

== Regional championships ==
The team competes in the IBSA America goalball region. The winner of the championships usually qualify for a berth at the World Championships or the Paralympic Games.

=== 2005 São Paulo ===
The team competed at the 2005 IBSA Goalball Americas Regional Championships which were part of the Fourth IBSA Pan-American Games, the competition being from Monday 5 September 2005 to Friday 9 September 2005, in São Paulo, Brazil. There were five men's teams: Argentina, Brazil, Canada, Mexico, and USA.

Brazil finished fourth ahead of Argentina.

=== 2011 Guadalajara ===
The team competed at the 2011 Parapan American Games from 13 to 19 November 2011, at the San Rafael Gymnasium in Guadalajara, Mexico. There were six men's teams: Argentina, Brazil, Canada, El Salvador, Mexico, USA. Athletes were Alexsander Celente, Leandro da Silva, Romário Marques, José Oliveira, Arestino Silva, and Filippe Silvestre.

Brazil took gold after the final match with USA.

=== 2013 Colorado Springs ===
The team competed at the 2013 Parapan American Games (which also hosted the 2013 IBSA World Youth Championships) from 11 to 14 July 2013, at Colorado Springs, Colorado, USA. There were six men's teams: Argentina, Brazil, Canada, Puerto Rico, USA, Venezuela.

USA beat Brazil in the gold medal match.

=== 2015 Toronto ===
The team competed at the 2015 Parapan American Games from 8 August 2015 to 15 August 2015, at the Mississauga Sports Centre, Toronto, Ontario, Canada. There were six men's teams: Argentina, Brazil, Canada, Puerto Rico, USA, Venezuela. Athletes included Alexsander Almeida Maciel Celente, Josemarcio Da Silva Sousa, Alex De Melo Sousa, Jose Ferreira De Oliveira, Romario Marques, and Leomon Moreno Da Silva.

Brazil beat USA to take the gold medal.

=== 2017 São Paulo ===
The team competed at the 2017 IBSA Goalball Americas Championships from Wednesday 29 November 2017 to Sunday 3 December 2017, at São Paulo, Brazil. There were eight men's teams: Argentina, Brazil, Canada, Costa Rica, Mexico, Peru, USA, and Venezuela (Costa Rica were disqualified for not having the minimum number of athletes to start a game).

Brazil beat USA to take the gold medal.

=== 2019 Lima ===
The team competed at the 2019 Parapan American Games from 23 August 2019 to 1 September 2019, at the Miguel Grau Coliseum, Lima, Peru. This championships was a qualifier for the 2020 Paralympic Games. There were eight men's teams: Argentina, Brazil, Canada, Guatemala, Mexico, Peru, USA, Venezuela.

Brazil beat USA to take the gold medal.

=== 2022 São Paulo ===
Due to the ongoing COVID-19 pandemic, the IBSA America championship moved from 6 to 13 November 2021, to 18 to 22 February 2022. The event was held at the Centro de Treinamento Paralímpico (Paralympic Training Center) in São Paulo. This championships was a qualifier for the 2022 World Championships.

There are thirteen men's teams: Argentina, Brazil, Canada, Chile, Colombia, Costa Rica, Guatemala, Mexico, Nicaragua, Peru, Puerto Rico, USA, Venezuela.

The team were very successful, mercing every competitor: Colombia (10:0), Chile (10:0), Argentina (14:4), Nicaragua (10:0), Venezuela (13:3), and Peru (10:0). In the quarter-finals, they defeated Puerto Rico (10:0), and in the semi-finals, Colombia (13:3). USA fell 2:12, allowing Brazil to take the gold medal. The Brazil women's team also took gold.

== See also ==
- Disabled sports
- Brazil women's national goalball team
- Brazil at the Paralympics
