= Mexico women's national goalball team =

Mexico national team, for the Paralympic sport of goalball

- Sport: Goalball
- League: IBSA
- Division: Women
- Region: IBSA America
- Location: Mexico
- Championships: Paralympic Games medals: :0:0:0; World Championship medals: :0:0:0

Mexico women's national goalball team is the women's national team of Mexico. Goalball is a team sport designed specifically for athletes with a vision impairment. The team takes part in international goalball competitions.

== World championships ==
=== 1982 Indianapolis ===
The team competed in the 1982 World Championships, from Monday 28 June to 01 July 1982, at the Hinkle Fieldhouse, Butler University in Indianapolis, Indiana, United States of America. Organised by United States Association of Blind Athletes, there were twelve men's and six women's teams. The team finished sixth overall.

=== 1994 Colorado Springs ===
The team competed in the 1994 World Championships, in Colorado Springs, Colorado, United States of America. There were thirteen men's and nine women's teams. The team finished ninth overall.

=== 2022 Matosinhos ===
The team competed in the 2022 World Championships from 7 to 16 December 2022, at the Centro de Desportos e Congressos de Matosinhos, Portugal. There were sixteen men's and sixteen women's teams. They placed eighth in Pool A, and fifteenth in final standings ahead of Portugal.

== Regional championships ==
The team competes in the IBSA America goalball region. The winner of the championships usually qualifies for a berth at the World Championships or the Paralympic Games.

=== 2011 Guadalajara ===
The team competed at the 2011 Parapan American Games from 13 to 19 November 2011, at the San Rafael Gymnasium in Guadalajara, Mexico. There were five women's teams: Brazil, Canada, El Salvador, Mexico, USA.

The team came fourth, ahead of El Salvador.

=== 2017 São Paulo ===
The team competed at the 2017 IBSA Goalball Americas Championships from Wednesday 29 November 2017 to Sunday 3 December 2017, at São Paulo, Brazil. There were six women's teams: Brazil, Canada, Costa Rica, Mexico, Peru, USA.

The team came fourth, ahead of Costa Rica and Peru.

=== 2019 Lima ===
The team competed at the 2019 Parapan American Games from 23 August 2019 to 1 September 2019, at the Miguel Grau Coliseum, Lima, Peru. This championships was a qualifier for the 2020 Paralympic Games. There were six women's teams: Brazil, Canada, Costa Rica, Mexico, Peru, USA.

The team came fourth, ahead of Costa Rica and Peru. They were defeated 0:10 by Canada.

=== 2022 São Paulo ===
Due to the ongoing COVID-19 pandemic, the IBSA America championship moved from 6 to 13 November 2021, to 18 to 22 February 2022. The event is being held at the Centro de Treinamento Paralímpico (Paralympic Training Center) in São Paulo. This championships is a qualifier for the 2022 World Championships.

There are twelve women's teams: Argentina, Brazil, Canada, Chile, Colombia, Costa Rica, Guatemala, Mexico, Nicaragua, Peru, USA, Venezuela.

The athletes are María Guadalupe Angulo Ornelas, Adriana Carrillo Vizcarra, Abril Itzel de Jesús Moreno, Arlyn Pamela de Jesús Moreno, and Valeria Espinosa Aguilar.

== See also ==
- Disabled sports
- Mexico men's national goalball team
- Mexico at the Paralympics
