= United States men's national goalball team =

United States of America national team, for the Paralympic sport of goalball

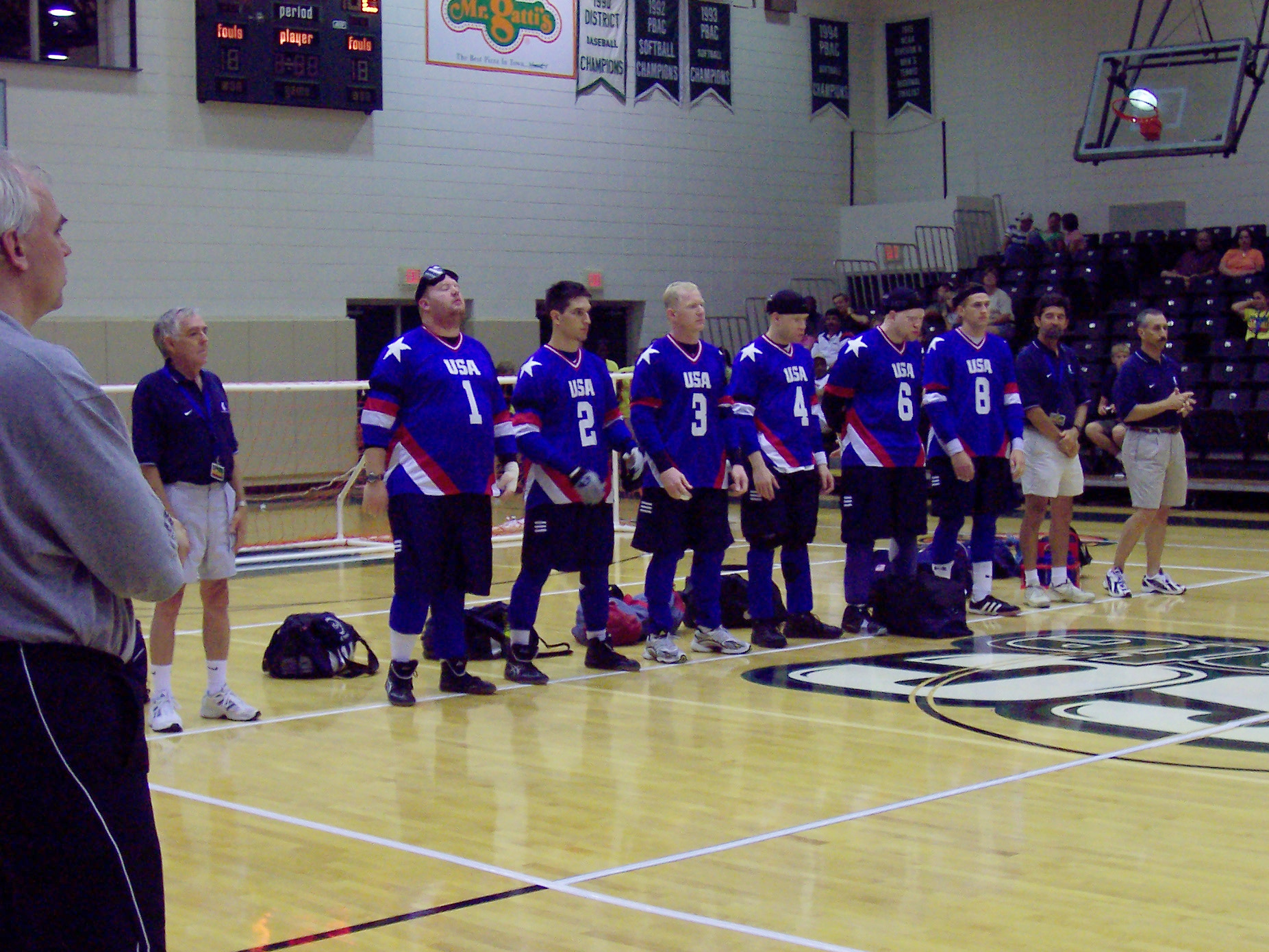
- United States men's goalball team. Goalball World Championships, Spartanburg, South Carolina, USA (July 2006).
- Sport: Goalball
- League: IBSA
- Division: Men
- Region: IBSA America
- Location: United States
- Colours: Red, white, blue
- Head coach: Keith Young (head coach); James Wallace (assistant coach)
- Championships: Paralympic Games medals: : 1: 3: 1 World Championship medals: : 1: 0: 2
- Parent group: United States Association of Blind Athletes (USABA)
- Website: www.usaba.org

United States men's national goalball team is the men's national team of the United States. Goalball is a team sport designed specifically for athletes with a vision impairment. The team takes part in international goalball competitions.

== Paralympic Games ==
=== 1976 Toronto ===
The 1976 Summer Paralympics were held in Toronto, Canada. The team was one of seven men's teams participating, and they finished seventh overall.

=== 1980 Arnhem ===
At the 1980 Summer Paralympic Games in Arnhem, Netherlands, twelve teams took part. The team finished second, behind Germany.

=== 1984 New York ===
New York hosted the 1984 Summer Paralympics where thirteen teams participated and the team finished first ahead of Egypt.

=== 1988 Seoul ===
The team competed in the 1988 Summer Paralympics, from 15 to 24 October 1988, in Seoul, South Korea. There were fourteen men's and eight women's teams. This was the first time the term "Paralympic" came into official use.

The team came second, behind Yugoslavia.

=== 1992 Barcelona ===
The team competed in the 1992 Summer Paralympics, from 3 to 14 September 1992, in the Pavelló de la Vall d'Hebron indoor stadium, Barcelona, Spain. There were twelve men's and eight women's teams.

The team finished fourth in the overall rankings.

=== 1996 Atlanta ===
The team competed in the 1996 Summer Paralympics, from 16 to 25 August 1996, in the GSU Sports Arena building, Atlanta, Georgia, United States of America. There were twelve men's and eight women's teams.

They finished eleventh, ahead of Czechoslovakia.

=== 2000 Sydney ===
The team competed in the 2000 Summer Paralympics, from 18 to 29 October 2000, at an Olympic Park indoor hall, Sydney, New South Wales, Australia. There were twelve men's and eight women's teams.

They finished eleventh, ahead of Great Britain.

=== 2004 Athens ===
The team competed in 2004 Summer Paralympics, from 17 and 28 September 2004, in the Faliro Sports Pavilion Arena, Athens, Greece. There were twelve men's and eight women's teams.

The team came third, behind Sweden and Denmark.

=== 2008 Beijing ===
The team competed in the 2008 Summer Paralympics, from 6 to 17 September 2008, in the Beijing Institute of Technology Gymnasium 'bat wing' arena, Beijing, China. There were twelve men's and eight women's teams. Athletes were: Steve Denuyl, Chris Dodds, Tyler Merren, Donte Mickens, Edward Munro, Daryl Walker. Coaching staff: Thomas Parrigin, Michael Legé, John Potts.

The team placed fourth overall.

=== 2016 Rio de Janeiro ===
The team competed in the 2016 Summer Paralympics, with competitionfrom Thursday 8 September to finals on Friday 16 September 2016, in the temporary Future Arena, Rio de Janeiro, Brazil. There were ten men's and ten women's teams (a decrease of two men's teams from past years). Athletes were: Andy Jenks, Tyler Merren, Daryl Walker, John Kusku, Joseph Hamilton, and Matt Simpson, with coaches Michael Legé and Matthew Boyle.

The team placed second.

The following is the United States roster in the men's goalball tournament of the 2016 Summer Paralympics.

No.	Player	Class	Date of birth (age)
1	Andy Jenks	B3	September 21, 1990 (aged 25)
2	Tyler Merren	B2	May 29, 1984 (aged 32)
3	Daryl Walker	B2	December 29, 1981 (aged 34)
4	John Kusku	B2	August 6, 1984 (aged 32)
5	Joseph Hamilton	B1	September 6, 1978 (aged 38)
7	Matt Simpson	B1	March 30, 1990 (aged 26)

Pos	Team	Pld	W	D	L	GF	GA	GD	Pts	Qualification
1	Lithuania	4	4	0	0	35	22	+13	12	Quarter-finals
2	United States	4	2	0	2	21	18	+3	6	Quarter-finals
3	Turkey	4	2	0	2	20	23	−3	6	Quarter-finals
4	China	4	1	0	3	25	28	−3	3	Quarter-finals
5	Finland	4	1	0	3	24	34	−10	3	

Source: Paralympic.org

9 September 2016; 09:00	United States	5–2	China	Future Arena, Rio de Janeiro; Referees: Rudi Janssen (BEL), Raquel Aguado (ESP)
9 September 2016; 09:00	Hamilton 3 Kusku 2	Report	Cai 2	Future Arena, Rio de Janeiro; Referees: Rudi Janssen (BEL), Raquel Aguado (ESP)

10 September 2016; 13:15	Lithuania	8–7	United States	Future Arena, Rio de Janeiro; Referees: Raquel Aguado (ESP); Patricia Fras (SLO)
10 September 2016; 13:15	Pavliukianec 6 Pazarauskas 2	Report	Hamilton 5 Merren 2	Future Arena, Rio de Janeiro; Referees: Raquel Aguado (ESP); Patricia Fras (SLO)

11 September 2016; 17:30	Finland	2–6	United States	Future Arena, Rio de Janeiro; Referees: Dawna Christy (CAN), Yoshinori Nii (JPN)
11 September 2016; 17:30	Mattila 1 Posio 1	Report	Merren 4 Hamilton 1 Kusku 1	Future Arena, Rio de Janeiro; Referees: Dawna Christy (CAN), Yoshinori Nii (JPN)

12 September 2016; 19:30	United States	3–6	Turkey	Future Arena, Rio de Janeiro; Referees: Raili Sipura (FIN), Daniel Voltan (BRA)
12 September 2016; 19:30	Kusku 1 Merren 1 Jenks 1	Report	Gündoğdu 4 Karakaya 2	Future Arena, Rio de Janeiro; Referees: Raili Sipura (FIN), Daniel Voltan (BRA)

Quarter-finals

14 September 2016; 12:00	United States	7–6	Germany	Future Arena, Rio de Janeiro; Referees: Daniel Voltan (BRA), Patricia Fras (SLO)
14 September 2016; 12:00	Merren 3 Hamilton 3 Kusku 1	Report	Steiger 3 Feistle 2 Horauf 1	Future Arena, Rio de Janeiro; Referees: Daniel Voltan (BRA), Patricia Fras (SLO)

Semi-finals

15 September 2016; 13:30	Brazil	1–10	United States	Future Arena, Rio de Janeiro; Referees: Bülent Kimyon (TUR), Raili Sipura (FIN)
15 September 2016; 13:30	Marques 1	Report	Merren 9 Hamilton 1	Future Arena, Rio de Janeiro; Referees: Bülent Kimyon (TUR), Raili Sipura (FIN)

Gold medal match

16 September 2016; 20:00	United States	8–14	Lithuania	Future Arena, Rio de Janeiro; Referees: Nejc Jakic (SLO), Daniel Voltan (BRA)
16 September 2016; 20:00	Simpson 4 Hamilton 1 Jenks 1 Merren 1 Walker 1	Report	Pavliukianec 8 Pazarauskas 6	Future Arena, Rio de Janeiro; Referees: Nejc Jakic (SLO), Daniel Voltan (BRA)

=== 2020 Tokyo ===
The team competed in the 2020 Summer Paralympics, with competition from Wednesday 25 August to finals on Friday 3 September 2021, in the Makuhari Messe arena, Chiba, Tokyo, Japan. Members were: Zach Buhler, John Kusku, Tyler Merren, Matt Simpson, Daryl Walker Calahan Young, with coaches Keith Young and James Wallace.

The following is the United States roster in the men's goalball tournament of the 2020 Summer Paralympics.

No.	Player	Class	Date of birth (age)
1	Daryl Walker	B2	December 29, 1981 (aged 39)
2	Tyler Merren	B2	May 29, 1984 (aged 37)
4	John Kusku	B2	August 6, 1984 (aged 37)
7	Matt Simpson	B1	March 30, 1990 (aged 31)
5	Zachary Buhler	B2	January 5, 1997 (aged 24)
6	Calahan Young	B2	February 23, 1995 (aged 26)

Pos	Team	Pld	W	D	L	GF	GA	GD	Pts	Qualification
1	Japan (H)	4	3	0	1	37	15	+22	9	Quarter-finals
2	Brazil	4	3	0	1	35	17	+18	9	Quarter-finals
3	United States	4	2	0	2	25	35	−10	6	Quarter-finals
4	Lithuania	4	1	1	2	24	31	−7	4	Quarter-finals
5	Algeria	4	0	1	3	20	43	−23	1	

Source: TOCOG
(H) Hosts

Round-robin

26 August 2021; 13:15	United States	8–6	Brazil	Makuhari Messe, Tokyo; Referees: Reza Dehghan (Iran), Robert Avery (Great Britain)
26 August 2021; 13:15	Young 4 Merren 1 Simpson 1 Walker 1 Sousa 1 (o.g.)	Report	Moreno 3 Sousa 2 Marques 1	Makuhari Messe, Tokyo; Referees: Reza Dehghan (Iran), Robert Avery (Great Britain)

27 August 2021; 13:15	Japan	11–1	United States	Makuhari Messe, Tokyo; Referees: Reza Dehghan (Iran), Woradet Kultawongwattana (Thailand)
27 August 2021; 13:15	Sano 6 Miyajiki 3 Kaneko 2	Report	Walker 1	Makuhari Messe, Tokyo; Referees: Reza Dehghan (Iran), Woradet Kultawongwattana (Thailand)

29 August 2021; 17:30	Algeria	5–13	United States	Makuhari Messe, Tokyo; Referees: Romualdas Vaitiekus (Lithuania), Warrick Jackes (Australia)
29 August 2021; 17:30	Belhouchat 4 Larbi 1	Report	Young 8 Simpson 3 Walker 2	Makuhari Messe, Tokyo; Referees: Romualdas Vaitiekus (Lithuania), Warrick Jackes (Australia)

30 August 2021; 13:15	United States	3–13	Lithuania	Makuhari Messe, Tokyo; Referees: Robert Avery (Great Britain), Bas Spaans (Netherlands)
30 August 2021; 13:15	Simpson 2 Young 1	Report	Montvydas 5 Zibolis 4 Pavliukianec 2 Pazarauskas 2	Makuhari Messe, Tokyo; Referees: Robert Avery (Great Britain), Bas Spaans (Netherlands)

Quarter-finals

31 August 2021; 15:00	Ukraine	4–5	United States	Makuhari Messe, Tokyo; Referees: Warrick Jackes (Australia), Vaida Pokvytytė (LTU)
31 August 2021; 15:00	Oliinyk 3 Zhyhalin 1	Report	Young 4 Simpson 1	Makuhari Messe, Tokyo; Referees: Warrick Jackes (Australia), Vaida Pokvytytė (LTU)

Semi-finals

2 September 2021; 13:15	China	8–1	United States	Makuhari Messe, Tokyo; Referees: Bas Spaans (Netherlands), Raquel Gomez Aguado (Spain)
2 September 2021; 13:15	Yang Mingyuan 6 Hu Mingyao 2	Report	Young 1	Makuhari Messe, Tokyo; Referees: Bas Spaans (Netherlands), Raquel Gomez Aguado (Spain)

== World Championships ==
IBSA World Goalball Championships have been held every four years from 1978. The men's team has represented the USA for all these championships. Placing first or second in the tournament may earn a berth in the Paralympic Games goalball tournaments.

=== 1978 Voecklamarkt ===
The team competed in the inaugural goalball world championships, in Vöcklamarkt, Austria. There were ten men's teams.

USA finished eighth ahead of the Republic of South Africa, and Great Britain.

=== 1982 Indianapolis ===
The team competed in the 1982 World Championships, from Monday 28 June to 1 July 1982, at the Hinkle Fieldhouse, Butler University in Indianapolis, Indiana, United States of America. Organized by United States Association of Blind Athletes, there were twelve men's and six women's teams. Coached by Stephen Kearney, athletes included Bonner, Jackson, Morris, and Neppl.

The team finished first, ahead of Nederlands.

=== 1986 Roermond ===
The 1986 IBSA World Goalball Championships were held in Roermond, the Netherlands. There were eighteen men's and ten women's teams.

The team finished fourth, behind Egypt, Israel, and Yugoslavia.

=== 1990 Calgary ===
The team competed in the 1990 World Championships, in Calgary, Alberta, Canada. There were twelve men's and seven women's teams.

The team finished fifth.

=== 1994 Colorado Springs ===
The team competed in the 1994 World Championships, in Colorado Springs, Colorado, United States of America. There were thirteen men's and nine women's teams.

The team finished fifth.

=== 1998 Madrid ===
The team competed in the 1998 World Championships, in Madrid, Spain. There were sixteen men's and eleven women's teams.

USA finished eighth overall.

=== 2002 Rio de Janeiro ===
The team competed in the 2002 World Championships, in Rio de Janeiro, Brazil, from 30 August 2002 to 8 September 2002. There were fourteen men's and ten women's teams.

USA finished eleventh overall.

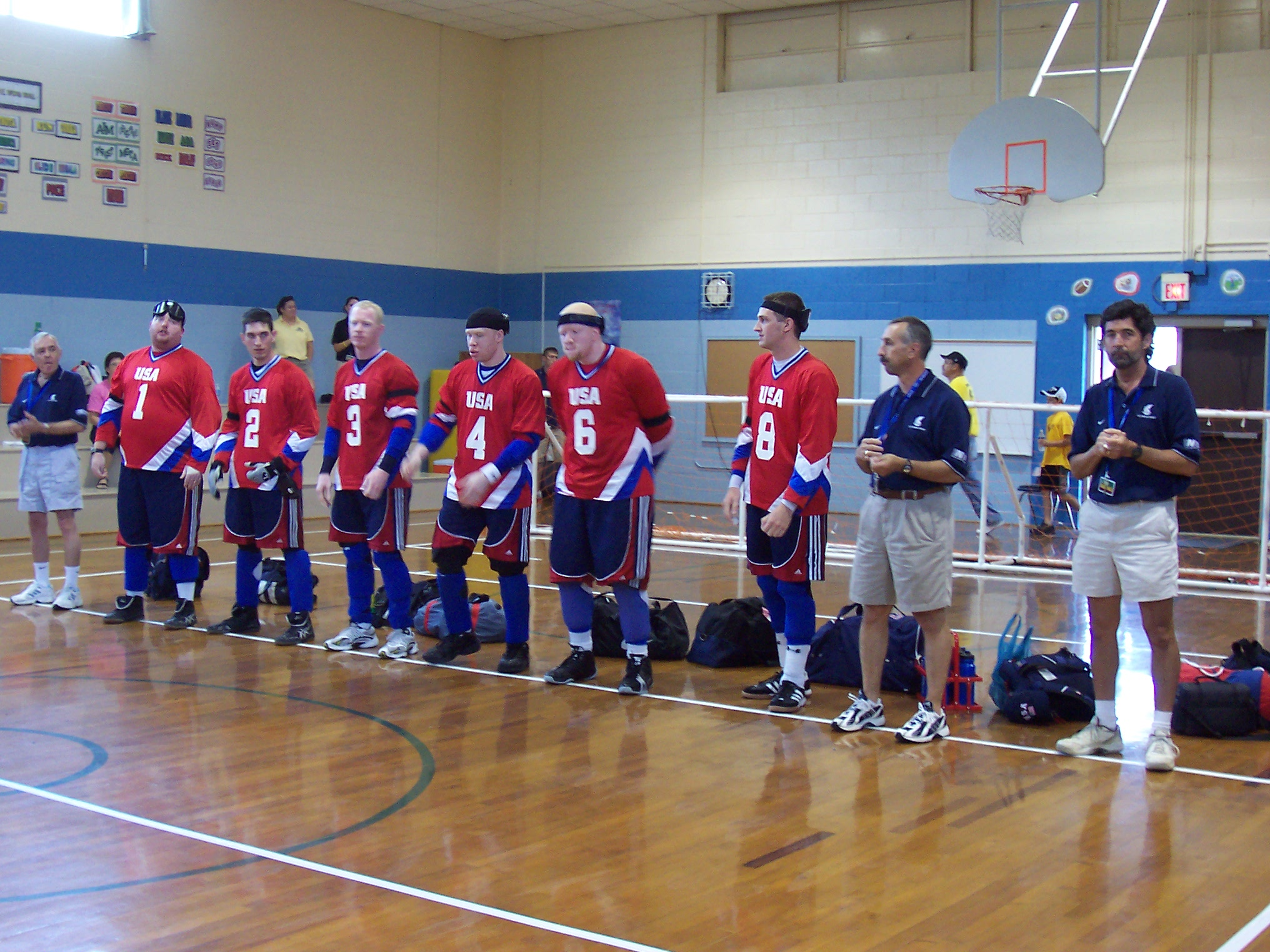
United States men's goalball team. Goalball World Championships, Spartanburg, South Carolina, USA (July 2006).

=== 2006 Spartanburg ===
The team competed in the 2006 World Championships, in July 2006, in Spartanburg, South Carolina, United States of America. There were sixteen men's and thirteen women's teams.

The team finished third, behind Sweden and Lithuania.

=== 2010 Sheffield ===
The team competed in the 2010 World Championships, from 20 to 25 June 2010, in Sheffield, England. There were sixteen men's and twelve women's teams.

USA was in Pool A, beating Canada 11:4, Algeria 4:2, Great Britain 10:2, Germany 5:1, and Belgium 4:1, but losing to China 5:7 and Iran 3:6.

=== 2014 Espoo ===
The team competed in the 2014 World Championships from 30 June to 5 July 2014, in Espoo, Finland. There were fourteen men's and ten women's teams. Athletes: Joseph Hamilton (#5), Andrew Jenks (#1), John Kusku (#4), Tyler Merren (#2), Matthew Simpson (#7), and Daryl Walker (#3).

They placed third in Pool A, beating Turkey 5:4 in the quarter-finals, but losing to Finland 3:6 in the semi-finals, to play off the bronze medal with Lithuania, winning 4:2.

=== 2018 Malmö ===
The team competed in the 2018 World Championships from 3 to 8 June 2018, at the Baltiska Hallen, Malmö, Sweden. There were sixteen men's and twelve women's teams. Athletes were Joe Hamilton, John Kusku, Grej Pesjaka, Daryl Walker, Josh Welborn and Calahan Young. Head coach was Matthew Boyle. Pesjaka, Welborn and Young were new to the team. Former national goalball high-performance director John Potts was appointed as team leader for both the men's and women's teams.

They placed third in Pool B, and fifth in final standings.

=== 2022 Matosinhos ===
The team competed in the 2022 World Championships from 7 to 16 December 2022, at the Centro de Desportos e Congressos de Matosinhos, Portugal. There were sixteen men's and sixteen women's teams. They placed fifth in Pool D, and ninth in final standings.

== IBSA World Games ==
=== 2003 Quebec City ===
The team competed in the 2003 IBSA World Games from Friday 1 to Sunday 10 August 2011, in Quebec City, Canada. Ten teams competed.

USA came second to Spain who took the gold medal.

=== 2011 Antalya ===
The team competed in the 2011 IBSA World Games from 1 to 10 April 2011, in Antalya, Turkey, organised by the Turkish Blind Sports Federation. There were fifteen men's and fourteen women's teams. They placed second in Group B, and were seventh in the final standings.

== Regional championships ==
The team competes in the IBSA America goalball region. The winner of the championships usually qualifies for a berth at the World Championships or the Paralympic Games.

=== 2005 São Paulo ===
The team competed at the 2005 IBSA Goalball Americas Regional Championships which were part of the Fourth IBSA Pan-American Games, the competition being from Monday 5 September 2005 to Friday 9 September 2005, in São Paulo, Brazil. There were five men's teams: Argentina, Brazil, Canada, Mexico, and USA.

The team finished first ahead of Brazil.

=== 2011 Guadalajara ===
The team competed at the 2011 Parapan American Games from 13 to 19 November 2011, at the San Rafael Gymnasium in Guadalajara, Mexico. There were six men's teams: Argentina, Brazil, Canada, El Salvador, Mexico, USA. Athletes were Joseph Hamilton, Andrew Jenks, John Kusku, Tyler Merren, Donte Mickens, and Daryl Walker.

The team finished second to Brazil.

=== 2013 Colorado Springs ===
The team competed at the 2013 Parapan American Games (which also hosted the 2013 IBSA World Youth Championships) from 11 to 14 July 2013, at Colorado Springs, Colorado, USA. There were six men's teams: Argentina, Brazil, Canada, Puerto Rico, USA, Venezuela. Athletes included Joe Hamilton (Sacramento, CA), Andy Jenks (Wilmington, DE), John Kusku (Warren, MI), Donté Mickens (Delray Beach, FL), Matt Simpson (Colorado Springs, CO), and Daryl Walker (Jacksonville, FL).

USA beat Brazil for the gold medal.

=== 2015 Toronto ===
The team competed at the 2015 Parapan American Games from 8 August 2015 to 15 August 2015, at the Mississauga Sports Centre, Toronto, Ontario, Canada. There were six men's teams: Argentina, Brazil, Canada, Puerto Rico, USA, Venezuela. Athletes were Joseph Hamilton, Andrew Jenks, John Kusku, Donté Mickens, Matt Simpson, and Daryl Walker.

USA finished with the silver medal, beaten by Brazil.

=== 2017 São Paulo ===
The team competed at the 2017 IBSA Goalball Americas Championships from Wednesday 29 November 2017 to Sunday 3 December 2017, at São Paulo, Brazil. There were eight men's teams: Argentina, Brazil, Canada, Costa Rica, Mexico, Peru, USA, and Venezuela (Costa Rica were disqualified for not having the minimum number of athletes to start a game).

USA finished with the silver medal, beaten by Brazil.

=== 2019 Lima ===
The team competed at the 2019 Parapan American Games from 23 August 2019 to 1 September 2019, at the Miguel Grau Coliseum, Lima, Peru. This championships was a qualifier for the 2020 Paralympic Games. There were eight men's teams: Argentina, Brazil, Canada, Guatemala, Mexico, Peru, USA, Venezuela.

USA finished with the silver medal, beaten by Brazil.

=== 2022 São Paulo ===
Due to the ongoing COVID-19 pandemic, the IBSA America championship moved from 6 to 13 November 2021, to 18 to 22 February 2022. The event is being held at the Centro de Treinamento Paralímpico (Paralympic Training Center) in São Paulo. This championships is a qualifier for the 2022 World Championships.

There are thirteen men's teams: Argentina, Brazil, Canada, Chile, Colombia, Costa Rica, Guatemala, Mexico, Nicaragua, Peru, Puerto Rico, USA, Venezuela.

The team is Zach Buhler (Huntington, IN), Christian King (Virginia Beach, VA), Tyler Merren (Coral Springs, FL), Daryl Walker (Jacksonville, FL), Sean Walker (Winchester, VA), Calahan Young (Pittsburgh, PA), and Keith Young (head coach), James Wallace (assistant coach), and Adam McDowell (trainer).

== See also ==
- Disabled sports
- United States women's national goalball team
- United States at the Paralympics
