= Africa Goalball Championships =

Regional goalball tournament

- Highest governing body: International Blind Sports Federation

Characteristics
- Contact: None
- Mixed-sex: No
- Type: Team sport; ball game; parasport
- Equipment: Goalball, eyeshades

Presence
- Country or region: Africa region

IBSA Africa Goalball Championships is one of the four competition regions used for World Championships and Paralympic Games qualification for goalball, a team sport for athletes with a vision impairment. Conducted under the rules of the International Blind Sports Federation (IBSA), the other regions are America, Asia-Pacific, and Europe.

== Hostings ==
=== 2010 Port Said ===
The 2010 IBSA Goalball African Championships was held in Port Said, Egypt. Final ranked teams were:

Men: Algeria, Morocco, Egypt, Kenya, Libya.

=== 2011 Sydney ===
The team competed in a composite tournament, the 2011 IBSA African-Oceania Regional Championships, with games from 15 to 17 November 2011, at the Sydney Olympic Park Sports Centre, Sydney, Australia. Although the four regions under the rules were Africa, America, Asia/Pacific, and Europe, as there were insufficient competitive teams in both Africa and Oceania regions, IBSA agreed to combined championships.

For the women's teams, it was only Australia versus New Zealand, the winner qualifying for the London 2012 Paralympic Games. From the best of three games, Australia dominated and qualified.

For the men's teams, Algeria beat Australia, who in turn, had beaten New Zealand. Algeria went onto the Paralympic Games.

=== 2013 Nairobi ===
The 2013 IBSA Goalball African Championships was held in Nairobi, Kenya Final ranked teams were:

Men: Algeria, Morocco, Egypt, Kenya, Rwanda, Ghana.

=== 2016 Algiers ===
The 2016 IBSA Goalball African Championships was held in Algiers, Algeria, from 27 February to 5 March 2016. Final ranked teams were:

Men: Algeria, Egypt, Morocco, Tunisia, Côte d'Ivoire.

Women: Algeria, Egypt, Morocco, Tunisia.

=== 2017 Sharm el Sheikh ===
The 2017 IBSA Goalball African Championships was held in Sharm el Sheikh, Egypt, from 14 to 24 October 2017. Final ranked teams were:

Men: Algeria, Egypt, Morocco, Rwanda, Kenya.

Women: Algeria, Egypt, Kenya.

=== 2020 Port Said ===
The 2020 IBSA Goalball African Championships was held in Port Said, Egypt. Because neither division had the minimum four competing teams, this was a regional tournament, not the regional championships. Final ranked teams were:

Men: Algeria, Egypt, Morocco.

Women: Algeria, Egypt, Morocco.

=== 2021 Cape Coast ===
The 2021 IBSA Goalball African Championships were from 6 to 10 December 2021, and held at Cape Coast, Ghana; the winners qualifying for the 2022 Goalball World Championships.

There were six men's teams and four women's teams.

Men: Algeria, Egypt, Cameroon, Ghana, Kenya, and Niger. Algeria came first, Egypt second, and Cameroon third.

Women: Algeria, Egypt, Ghana, and Kenya. Algeria came first, Egypt second, and Ghana third.

=== 2023 Giza ===
The 2023 IBSA Goalball African Championships were from 8 to 15 December 2023, at the Hassan Moustafa Sports Hall, Giza, Cairo, Egypt.

Men: Algeria, Egypt, Ghana, and Ivory Coast. Egypt came first, Algeria second, and Ghana third.

Women: Algeria, Egypt, and Ghana. Algeria came first, Egypt second, and Ghana third.

=== 2025 Giza ===
The 2025 IBSA Goalball African Championships were held from Sunday 7 December to Wednesday 10 December 2025, at the Hassan Moustafa Sports Hall, Giza, Cairo, Egypt. Under regulation 48: 'Qualifying standards' of the goalball rules, the women's competition would be a tournament, not a regional championship, and would not be allocated a slot at the forthcoming world championships.

Men: Algeria, Benin, Cameroon, Egypt, and Libya.

Women: Algeria, and Egypt.

== African Championships results ==
=== Men ===
Edition	Year	Host (final location)	Gold medal game			Bronze medal game		
Edition	Year	Host (final location)	Gold	Score	Silver	Bronze	Score	Fourth place
1	2001	(Algeria) Algiers	Algeria					
2	2010	(Egypt) Port Said	Algeria	13-7	Egypt			
3	2013	(Kenya) (Nairobi)	Algeria	12-2	Egypt	Morocco	12-2	Rwanda
4	2016	(Algeria) Algiers	Algeria	7-2	Egypt	Morocco	14-4	Tunisia
5	2017	(Egypt) Sharm el Sheikh	Algeria	10-1	Egypt	Morocco	10-6	Rwanda
6	2020	(Egypt) Port Said	Algeria	11-1	Morocco	Egypt		
7	2021	(Ghana) Cape Coast	Algeria	10-5	Egypt	Cameroon	12 - 11	Ghana
8	2023	(Egypt) Cairo	Egypt	4-3	Algeria	Ghana		

=== Women ===
Edition	Year	Host (final location)	Gold medal game			Bronze medal game		
Edition	Year	Host (final location)	Gold	Score	Silver	Bronze	Score	Fourth place
1	2016	(Algeria) Algiers	Algeria	11-1	Egypt	Morocco	-	Tunisia
2	2017	(Egypt) Sharm el Sheikh	Algeria	12-2	Egypt	Morocco		
3	2020	(Egypt) Port Said	Algeria	12-2	Egypt	Morocco		
4	2021	(Ghana) Cape Coast	Algeria	10-0	Egypt	Ghana		Kenya
5	2023	(Egypt) Cairo	Algeria	12-2	Egypt	Ghana		

== See also ==
- Goalball World Championships
- Goalball at the Summer Paralympics
