= Andy Jenks =

American goalball player

Personal information
- Full name: Andrew Jenks
- Born: September 21, 1990 (age 35) New Albany, Indiana, U.S.
- Home town: Wilmington, Delaware, U.S.
- Height: 6 ft 4 in (193 cm)
- Weight: 245 lb (111 kg)

Sport
- Country: United States
- Sport: Goalball
- Disability: Achromatopsia
- Disability class: B3
Medal record
Men's goalball
Representing United States
Paralympic Games
Silver medal – second place	2016 Rio de Janeiro	Team
World Championships
Bronze medal – third place	2014 Espoo	Team
Parapan American Games
Silver medal – second place	2011 Guadalajara	Team
Silver medal – second place	2015 Toronto	Team

Andrew Jenks (born September 21, 1990) is an American goalball player born with incomplete achromatopsia.

He was introduced to play goalball at a school sports day at the age of 10.
