= Argentina women's national goalball team =

Argentina national team, for the Paralympic sport of goalball

Selección Argentina de Goalball
- Sport: Goalball
- League: IBSA
- Division: Women
- Region: IBSA America
- Location: Argentina
- Colours: Dark blue, white, light blue
- Championships: Paralympic Games medals: :0:0:0; World Championship medals: :0:0:0

Argentina women's national goalball team is the women's national team of Argentina. Goalball is a team sport designed specifically for athletes with a vision impairment. The team takes part in international goalball competitions.

== World Championships ==
=== 1998 Madrid ===
The team competed in the 1998 World Championships, in Madrid, Spain. The team was one of eleven women's teams participating, and they finished eleventh overall.

=== 2022 Matosinhos ===
The team competed in the 2022 World Championships from 7 to 16 December 2022, at the Centro de Desportos e Congressos de Matosinhos, Portugal. There were sixteen men's and sixteen women's teams. They placed seventh in Pool A, and thirteenth in final standings.

== Regional championships ==
The team competes in the IBSA America goalball region. The winner of the championships usually qualifies for a berth at the World Championships or the Paralympic Games.

=== 2022 São Paulo ===
Due to the ongoing COVID-19 pandemic: IBSA America moved from 6 to 13 November 2021, to 18 to 22 February 2022. The event was held at the Centro de Treinamento Paralímpico (Paralympic Training Center) in São Paulo. This championships was a qualifier for the 2022 World Championships. There are twelve women's teams: Argentina, Brazil, Canada, Chile, Colombia, Costa Rica, Guatemala, Mexico, Nicaragua, Peru, USA, Venezuela.

This was the team's first regional championships appearance, although the men's team has been involved since 2005.

The team's round-robin section resulted in being mercied by USA (1:11), but mercying Costa Rica (10:0), beating Nicaragua (6:2) and Chile (7:3), and narrowly avoiding mercy by Canada (10:1). Entering the quarter-finals, they were successful against Mexico (5:4), but lost to Canada (4:2) in the semi-finals. They were defeated by USA (6:0) in the bronze medal match, to take fourth position overall.

== See also ==
- Disabled sports
- Argentina men's national goalball team
- Argentina at the Paralympics
