= Canada men's national goalball team =

Canadian national team, for the Paralympic sport of goalball

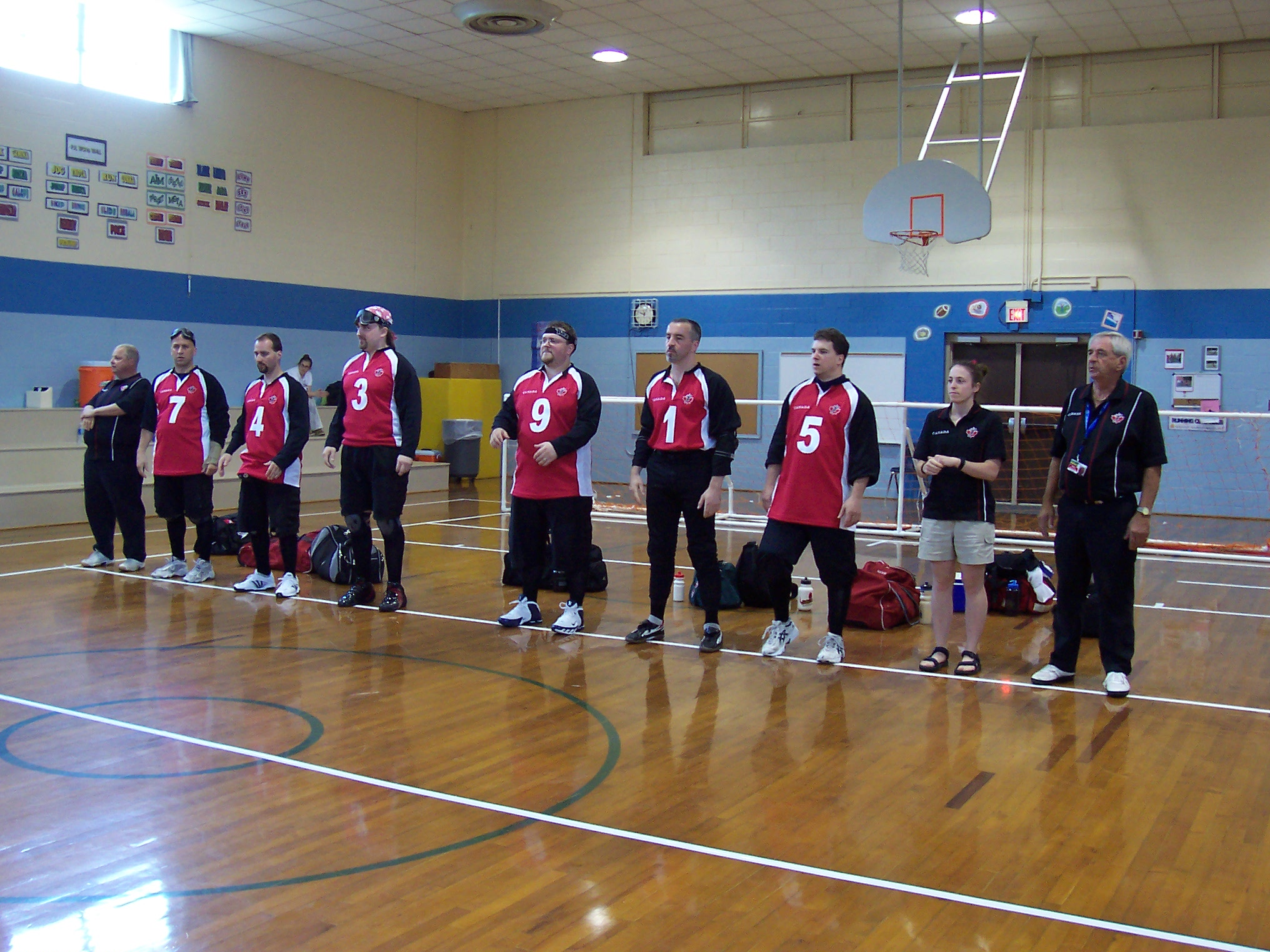
- Canada men's goalball team. Goalball World Championships, Spartanburg, South Carolina, USA (July 2006).
- Sport: Goalball
- League: IBSA
- Division: Men
- Region: IBSA America
- Location: Canada
- Colours: Red, Black, White
- Head coach: Nathalie Séguin
- Championships: Paralympic Games medals: : 0: 1: 0 World Championship medals: : 0: 0: 0
- Parent group: Canadian Blind Sports Association; Canadian Paralympic Committee
- Website: canadianblindsports.ca

Canada men's national goalball team is the men's national team of Canada. Goalball is a team sport designed specifically for athletes with a vision impairment. The team takes part in international goalball competitions.

== Paralympic Games ==
=== 1976 Toronto ===
The 1976 Summer Paralympics were held in Toronto, Canada. The team was one of seven teams participating, and they finished sixth overall. At the 1980 Summer Paralympics in Arnhem, Netherlands, twelve teams took part. The team finished ninth. New York hosted the 1984 Summer Paralympics where thirteen teams participated and the team finished eleventh.

=== 1984 New York ===
The team competed in the 1984 Summer Paralympics at Long Island, New York City, United States of America, where thirteen men's and five women's teams participated.

Canada finished eleventh, ahead of Denmark and Australia.

=== 1988 Seoul ===
The team competed in the 1988 Summer Paralympics, from 15 to 24 October 1988, in Seoul, South Korea. There were fourteen men's and eight women's teams. This was the first time the term "Paralympic" came into official use.

Canada placed sixth in the final rankings.

=== 1992 Barcelona ===
The team competed in the 1992 Summer Paralympics, from 3 to 14 September 1992, in the Pavelló de la Vall d'Hebron indoor stadium, Barcelona, Spain. There were twelve men's and eight women's teams.

Canada placed fifth in the final rankings.

=== 1996 Atlanta ===
The team competed in the 1996 Summer Paralympics, from 16 to 25 August 1996, in the GSU Sports Arena building, Atlanta, Georgia, United States of America. There were twelve men's and eight women's teams. Athletes were: Mario Caron, Jeff Christy, J. Crepault, Roberto Gaunt, Eric Houle, and Dean Kozak.

The team made the silver medal finals but lost to Finland.

=== 2004 Athens ===
The team competed in 2004 Summer Paralympics, from 17 and 28 September 2004, in the Faliro Sports Pavilion Arena, Athens, Greece. There were twelve men's and eight women's teams. Athletes were: Mario Caron, Jeff Christy, Rob Christy, Bruno Hache, Kevin Kaminski, and Dean Kozak.

The team made the bronze medal finals but lost to the USA.

=== 2008 Beijing ===
The team did not compete in 2008 Summer Paralympics, from 6 to 17 September 2008, in the Beijing Institute of Technology Gymnasium 'bat wing' arena, Beijing, China. There were twelve men's and eight women's teams. Athletes were: Mario Caron, Jeff Christy, Rob Christy, Bruno Hache, and Dean Kozak.

The team lost to Lithuania in the quarter-finals.

=== 2012 London ===
The team competed in the 2012 Summer Paralympics from 30 August to 7 September 2012, in the Copper Box Arena, London, England.

The following is the Canada roster in the men's goalball tournament of the 2012 Summer Paralympics.

No.	Player	Age
1	Ahmad Zeividavi	27
3	Brendan Gaulin	23
4	Simon Tremblay	30
5	Bruno Hache	35
7	Mario Caron	50
8	Doug Ripley	38

Team	Pld	W	D	L	GF	GA	GD	Pts	Qualification
Iran	5	4	0	1	32	20	+12	12	Quarterfinals
China	5	3	1	1	20	14	+6	10	Quarterfinals
Belgium	5	3	1	1	19	16	+3	10	Quarterfinals
Algeria	5	2	0	3	18	17	+1	6	Quarterfinals
South Korea	5	1	0	4	18	28	−10	3	Eliminated
Canada	5	1	0	4	16	28	−12	3	Eliminated

Source: "London 2012 Paralympic Games - Goalball results" (PDF). Paralympic.org. 3 October 2012 – via Goalball.sport.

31 August 2012; 19:45	Iran	9 – 2	Canada	Copper Box, London; Referees: Dina Murdie (GBR), Tony Connolly (USA)
31 August 2012; 19:45	Jafari 4 Sayahi 3 Shahbazi 1 Shirdel 1	Report	Gaulin 2	Copper Box, London; Referees: Dina Murdie (GBR), Tony Connolly (USA)

1 September 2012; 16:15	Canada	5 – 4	South Korea	Copper Box, London; Referees: Kimberly Anderson (USA), Shinji Mizuno (JPN)
1 September 2012; 16:15	Gaulin 3 Caron 2	Report	C-H Kim 2 Hong 1 J-W Oh 1	Copper Box, London; Referees: Kimberly Anderson (USA), Shinji Mizuno (JPN)

2 September 2012; 16:15	Canada	6 – 8	Algeria	Copper Box, London; Referees: Vilma Venckutonyte (LTU), Yasser Omar (EGY)
2 September 2012; 16:15	Caron 4 Gaulin 2	Report	Mokrane 8	Copper Box, London; Referees: Vilma Venckutonyte (LTU), Yasser Omar (EGY)

3 September 2012; 11:30	China	3 – 1	Canada	Copper Box, London; Referees: Ali Aldarsony (KSA), Christl Daentler (GER)
3 September 2012; 11:30	Chen 2 Yao 1	Report	Gaulin 1	Copper Box, London; Referees: Ali Aldarsony (KSA), Christl Daentler (GER)

=== 2016 Rio ===
The team competed in the 2016 Summer Paralympics, with competition from Thursday 8 September to finals on Friday 16 September 2016, in the temporary Future Arena, Rio de Janeiro, Brazil. There were ten men's and ten women's teams (a decrease of two men's teams from past years).

The following is the Canada roster in the men's goalball tournament of the 2016 Summer Paralympics.

No.	Player	Class	Date of birth (age)
1	Ahmad Zeivdavi	B1	September 3, 1985 (aged 31)
3	Brendan Gaulin	B3	July 13, 1989 (aged 27)
5	Bruno Hache	B2	July 13, 1977 (aged 39)
6	Blair Nesbitt	B3	November 24, 1992 (aged 23)
7	Doug Ripley	B3	November 15, 1973 (aged 42)
8	Simon Richard	B3	May 12, 1994 (aged 22)

Pos	Team	Pld	W	D	L	GF	GA	GD	Pts	Qualification
1	Brazil (H)	4	4	0	0	42	15	+27	12	Quarter-finals
2	Sweden	4	3	0	1	33	23	+10	9	Quarter-finals
3	Germany	4	1	0	3	24	26	−2	3	Quarter-finals
4	Canada	4	1	0	3	26	39	−13	3	Quarter-finals
5	Algeria	4	1	0	3	25	47	−22	3	

Source: Paralympic.org
(H) Hosts

9 September 2016; 13:15	Canada	3–11	Brazil	Future Arena, Rio de Janeiro; Referees: Patricia Fras (SLO), Nejc Jakic (SLO)
9 September 2016; 13:15	Hache 2 Ripley 1	Report	Marques 4 de Melo 3 Moreno 2 Sousa 1 Celente 1	Future Arena, Rio de Janeiro; Referees: Patricia Fras (SLO), Nejc Jakic (SLO)

10 September 2016; 17:30	Germany	5–7	Canada	Future Arena, Rio de Janeiro; Referees: Vilma Basinkaite (LTU), Raili Sipura (FIN)
10 September 2016; 17:30	Feistle 5	Report	Gaulin 6 Nesbitt 1	Future Arena, Rio de Janeiro; Referees: Vilma Basinkaite (LTU), Raili Sipura (FIN)

12 September 2016; 11:30	Algeria	17–13	Canada	Future Arena, Rio de Janeiro; Referees: Raili Sipura (FIN), Alexander Knecht (GER)
12 September 2016; 11:30	Mokrane 9 Godmane 6 Larbi 1 Boutaleb 1	Report	Nesbitt 6 Hache 3 Gaulin 3 Larbi 1 (o.g)	Future Arena, Rio de Janeiro; Referees: Raili Sipura (FIN), Alexander Knecht (GER)

13 September 2016; 14:15	Canada	3–6	Sweden	Future Arena, Rio de Janeiro; Referees: Alexander Knecht (GER), Vilma Basinkaite (LTU)
13 September 2016; 14:15	Nesbitt 2 Zeividavi 1	Report	Björkstrand 3 Seremeti 3	Future Arena, Rio de Janeiro; Referees: Alexander Knecht (GER), Vilma Basinkaite (LTU)

Quarter-finals

14 September 2016; 18:00	Lithuania	5–4	Canada	Future Arena, Rio de Janeiro; Referees: Bülent Kimyon (TUR), Alexander Knecht (GER)
14 September 2016; 18:00	Pazarauskas 3 Pavliukianec 2	Report	Ripley 2 Hache 1 Nesbitt 1	Future Arena, Rio de Janeiro; Referees: Bülent Kimyon (TUR), Alexander Knecht (GER)

== World Championships ==
IBSA World Goalball Championships have been held every four years from 1978. The men's team regularly represents Canada in these championships. Placing first or second in the tournament may earn a berth in the Paralympic Games goalball tournaments.

=== 1978 Voecklamarkt ===
The team competed in the inaugural goalball world championships, in Vöcklamarkt, Austria. There were ten men's teams. Canada ranked seventh.

=== 1982 Indianapolis ===
The team competed in the 1982 World Championships, from Monday 28 June to 01 July 1982, at the Hinkle Fieldhouse, Butler University in Indianapolis, Indiana, United States of America. Organised by United States Association of Blind Athletes, there were twelve men's and six women's teams. Coach was Michaud Luis, with athletes Bourdeau, Caron, Lambert, Leduc, and Rodrigue.

Canada came fourth in the final rankings, behind Egypt, Nederlands, and USA.

=== 1986 Roermond ===
The 1986 IBSA World Goalball Championships were held in Roermond, the Netherlands. There were eighteen men's and ten women's teams.

Canada came eleventh in the final rankings.

=== 1990 Calgary ===
The team competed in the 1990 World Championships, in Calgary, Alberta, Canada. There were twelve men's and seven women's teams.

Canada came sixth in the final rankings.

=== 1994 Colorado Springs ===
The team competed in the 1994 World Championships, in Colorado Springs, Colorado, United States of America. There were thirteen men's and nine women's teams.

Canada came fifth in the final rankings.

=== 1998 Madrid ===
The team competed in the 1998 World Championships, in Madrid, Spain. There were sixteen men's and eleven women's teams.

Canada came sixth in the final rankings.

=== 2002 Rio de Janeiro ===
The team competed in the 2002 World Championships, in Rio de Janeiro, Brazil, from 30 August 2002 to 8 September 2002. There were fourteen men's and ten women's teams.

Canada came eighth in the final rankings.

=== 2006 Spartanburg ===
The team competed in the 2006 World Championships, in July 2006, in Spartanburg, South Carolina, United States of America. There were sixteen men's and thirteen women's teams.

Canada came sixth in the final rankings.

=== 2010 Sheffield ===
The team competed in the 2010 World Championships, from 20 to 25 June 2010, in Sheffield, England. There were sixteen men's and twelve women's teams.

Canada was in Pool A, beating Belgium, Germany, and Great Britain, drawing with Iran, and losing to Algeria, China, and USA.

=== 2014 Espoo ===
The team competed in the 2014 World Championships from 30 June to 5 July 2014, in Espoo, Finland. There were fourteen men's and ten women's teams. Athletes: Brendan Gaulin (#3), Bruno Hache (#5), Simon Richard (#8), Douglas Ripley (#7), Simon Tremblay (#4), and Ahmad Zeividavi (#1).

They placed sixth of eight teams in Pool B.

=== 2018 Malmö ===
The team competed in the 2018 World Championships from 3 to 8 June 2018, at the Baltiska Hallen, Malmö, Sweden. There were sixteen men's and twelve women's teams. Athletes included: Brendan Gaulin (Burnaby, British Columbia), Aron Ghebreyohanes (Alberta), Bruno Hache (Montreal, Quebec), Blair Nesbitt (Stony Plain, Alberta), Doug Ripley (British Columbia), and Ahmad Zeividavi (Vancouver, British Columbia). Reserves were Peter Parsons and Simon Tremblay.

They placed sixth of eight teams in Pool B, and twelfth in final standings.

=== 2022 Matosinhos ===
The team competed in the 2022 World Championships from 7 to 16 December 2022, at the Centro de Desportos e Congressos de Matosinhos, Portugal. There were sixteen men's and sixteen women's teams. They placed seventh in Pool C, and thirteenth in final standings.

== IBSA World Games ==
=== 2003 Quebec City ===
The team competed in the 2003 IBSA World Games from Friday 1 to Sunday 10 August 2011, in Quebec City, Canada. Ten teams competed.

Canada finished third.

=== 2011 Antalya ===
The team competed in the 2011 IBSA World Games from 1 to 10 April 2011, in Antalya, Turkey, organised by the Turkish Blind Sports Federation. There were fifteen men's and fourteen women's teams. They placed third in Group B, and were third overall in the final standings.

== Regional championships ==
The team competes in the IBSA America goalball region. The winner of the championships usually qualifies for a berth at the World Championships or the Paralympic Games.

=== 2005 São Paulo ===
The team competed at the 2005 IBSA Goalball Americas Regional Championships which were part of the Fourth IBSA Pan-American Games, the competition being from Monday 5 September 2005 to Friday 9 September 2005, in São Paulo, Brazil. There were five men's and three women's teams. There were five men's teams: Argentina, Brazil, Canada, Mexico, and USA.

Canada beat USA to take the gold medal.

=== 2011 Guadalajara ===
The team competed at the 2011 Parapan American Games from 13 to 19 November 2011, at the San Rafael Gymnasium in Guadalajara, Mexico. There were six men's teams: Argentina, Brazil, Canada, El Salvador, Mexico, USA.

Canada finished fourth.

=== 2013 Colorado Springs ===
The team competed at the 2013 Parapan American Games (which also hosted the 2013 IBSA World Youth Championships) from 11 to 14 July 2013, at Colorado Springs, Colorado, USA. There were six men's teams: Argentina, Brazil, Canada, Puerto Rico, USA, Venezuela.

Canada finished third behind Brazil and USA.

=== 2015 Toronto ===
The team competed at the 2015 Parapan American Games from 8 August 2015 to 15 August 2015, at the Mississauga Sports Centre, Toronto, Ontario, Canada. There were six men's teams: Argentina, Brazil, Canada, Puerto Rico, USA, Venezuela. Athletes were Brendan Gaulin, Aron Ghebreyohannes, Bruno Haché, Blair Nesbitt, Simon Richard, and Ahmad Zeividavi.

Canada came third behind USA and Brazil.

=== 2017 São Paulo ===
The team competed at the 2017 IBSA Goalball Americas Championships from Wednesday 29 November 2017 to Sunday 3 December 2017, at São Paulo, Brazil. There were eight men's teams: Argentina, Brazil, Canada, Costa Rica, Mexico, Peru, USA, and Venezuela (Costa Rica were disqualified for not having the minimum number of athletes to start a game).

Canada came third behind USA and Brazil.

=== 2019 Lima ===
The team competed at the 2019 Parapan American Games from 23 August 2019 to 1 September 2019, at the Miguel Grau Coliseum, Lima, Peru. This championships was a qualifier for the 2020 Paralympic Games. There were eight men's teams: Argentina, Brazil, Canada, Guatemala, Mexico, Peru, USA, Venezuela.

Canada came third behind USA and Brazil.

=== 2022 São Paulo ===
Due to the ongoing COVID-19 pandemic, the IBSA America championship moved from 6 to 13 November 2021, to 18 to 22 February 2022. The event is being held at the Centro de Treinamento Paralímpico (Paralympic Training Center) in São Paulo. This championships is a qualifier for the 2022 World Championships.

There are thirteen men's teams: Argentina, Brazil, Canada, Chile, Colombia, Costa Rica, Guatemala, Mexico, Nicaragua, Peru, Puerto Rico, USA, Venezuela.

The team consists of Aaron Prevost (Alberta), Ahmad Zeividavi (British Columbia), Blair Nesbitt (Alberta), Brice Parker (Ontario), Douglas Ripley (British Columbia), Peter Parsons (Nova Scotia), with Nathalie Séguin (coach), Nadine Smith (physiotherapist), Stephen Burke (team manager).

== Other tournaments ==
=== Youth male national team ===
==== 2009 competition ====
The 2009 IBSA Pan American Games and IBSA World Youth and Student Championships were held in Colorado Springs, Colorado, United States of America. Canada fielded a men's team of Tyler Burk (Ottawa, On), Brendan Gaulin (Vancouver, BC), Bruno Hache (Dorval, QC), and Simon Tremblay (Quebec, QC). Staff were Danny Snow, head coach (Calgary, AB), Robert Lebel, assistant coach (Vancouver, BC), and Isabelle Trottier, physiotherapist (Quebec, QC).

Canada also fielded 2009 youth boys team: Clement Chou (Vancouver, BC), Aron Grebreyohannes (Calgary, AB), Dylan Johnson (Madoc, ON), Paul McKnight (Calgary, AB), Aaron Prevost (Brantford, ON), and John Tee (Vancouver, BC). Staff were Darren Hamilton, co-coach (Calgary, AB), and Trent Farebrother, co-coach (Red Deer, AB).

==== 2011 competition ====
In 2011, the IBSA World Youth and Student Championships were held in Colorado Springs, Colorado, United States of America. Canada fielded a youth boys team of: Athletes included Arvin Carandang (Scarborough, Ontario), Clement Chou (Vancouver, BC), and Simon Richard (Moncton, NB). Staff were Janice Dawson, high performance head coach (Calgary, AB), Natalie Scott, assistant coach (Saskatoon, SK), and Mercedes Louro, physiotherapist (Calgary, AB).

== See also ==
- Canada women's national goalball team
- Canada at the Paralympics
- Goalball at the Summer Paralympic Games
