= Matt Simpson (goalball) =

American Paralympic goalball player

Personal information
- Born: March 30, 1990 (age 36) Atlanta, Georgia, U.S.
- Height: 5 ft 10 in (178 cm)

Sport
- Country: United States
- Sport: Goalball
Medal record
Men's goalball
Representing United States
Paralympic Games
Silver medal – second place	2016 Rio de Janeiro	Team
World Championships
Bronze medal – third place	2014 Espoo	Team
Parapan American Games
Silver medal – second place	2015 Toronto	Team
Silver medal – second place	2019 Lima	Team

Matthew Simpson (born March 30, 1990) is an American goalball player. Simpson represented the United States at the 2016, 2020, and 2024 Summer Paralympics.

== Early life ==
When Simpson was about a year old, he began moving his eye in unusual ways. The doctors who first examined him believed it was a condition he would grow out of, but once he started sitting unusually close to the family television, his parents suspected a more serious condition. When he was four years old, he was diagnosed with a degenerative retinal condition that would eventually leave him blind. In later years, Simpson would consider learning about his diagnosis that early to be a blessing in disguise.

While he was a devoted fan of baseball in general and the Atlanta Braves in particular, he realized that playing it would not be an option due to his vision impairment. He first turned to swimming and running, but took to goalball once he was exposed to the sport at a summer camp at ten years old. Upon returning from camp, he told his father that he would play goalball in the Paralympics. At the time, there was no goalball program in the Atlanta area, but his father started one with the help of the Georgia Blind Sports Association.

== Education ==
Simpson graduated from Washington and Lee University in 2012, after which he worked in Colorado for the United States Association of Blind Athletes. After winning a silver medal at the 2016 Summer Paralympics, Simpson attended the University of Virginia School of Law and graduated in 2020. He currently works as an associate for Sidley Austin.

== Career ==
Simpson first made the United States men's national goalball team in 2011 while a student at Washington and Lee. He represented the United States at the Parapan American Games and won a silver medal in 2015 and 2019.

He represented the United States at the 2016 Summer Paralympics in goalball and won a silver medal. He represented the United States at the 2020 Summer Paralympics, losing to Lithuania in the bronze medal match. He again represented the United States at the 2024 Summer Paralympics, losing to Japan in the quarterfinals.
