= Mexico men's national goalball team =

Mexico national team, for the Paralympic sport of goalball

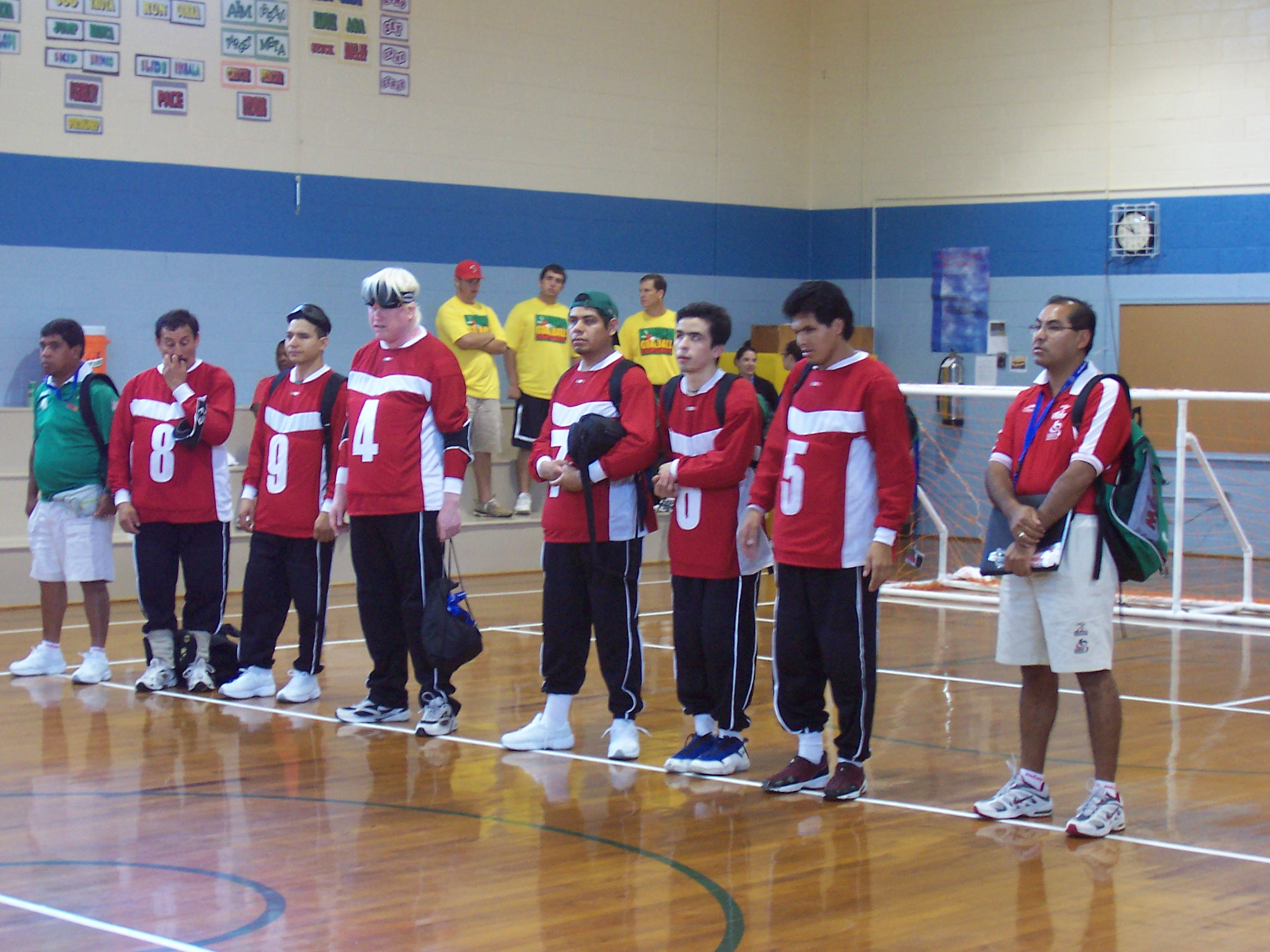
- Mexico men's goalball team. Goalball World Championships, Spartanburg, South Carolina, USA (July 2006).
- Sport: Goalball
- League: IBSA
- Division: Men
- Region: IBSA America
- Location: Mexico
- Championships: Paralympic Games medals: : 0: 0: 0 World Championship medals: : 0: 0: 0
- Parent group: Federación Mexicana del Deporte para Ciegos y Débiles Visuales

Mexico men's national goalball team is the men's national team of Mexico. Goalball is a team sport designed specifically for athletes with a vision impairment. The team takes part in international competitions.

== World Championships ==
IBSA World Goalball Championships have been held every four years from 1978. Placing first or second in the tournament may earn a berth in the Paralympic Games goalball tournaments.

=== 1982 Indianapolis ===
The team competed in the 1982 World Championships, from Monday 28 June to 01 July 1982, at the Hinkle Fieldhouse, Butler University in Indianapolis, Indiana, United States of America. Organised by United States Association of Blind Athletes, there were twelve men's and six women's teams. Coached by Juan Jose Lara, athletes included Escamilla, Garcia, and Irra.

The team came last.

=== 1994 Colorado Springs ===
The team competed in the 1994 World Championships, in Colorado Springs, Colorado, United States of America. There were thirteen men's and nine women's teams. The team finished last.

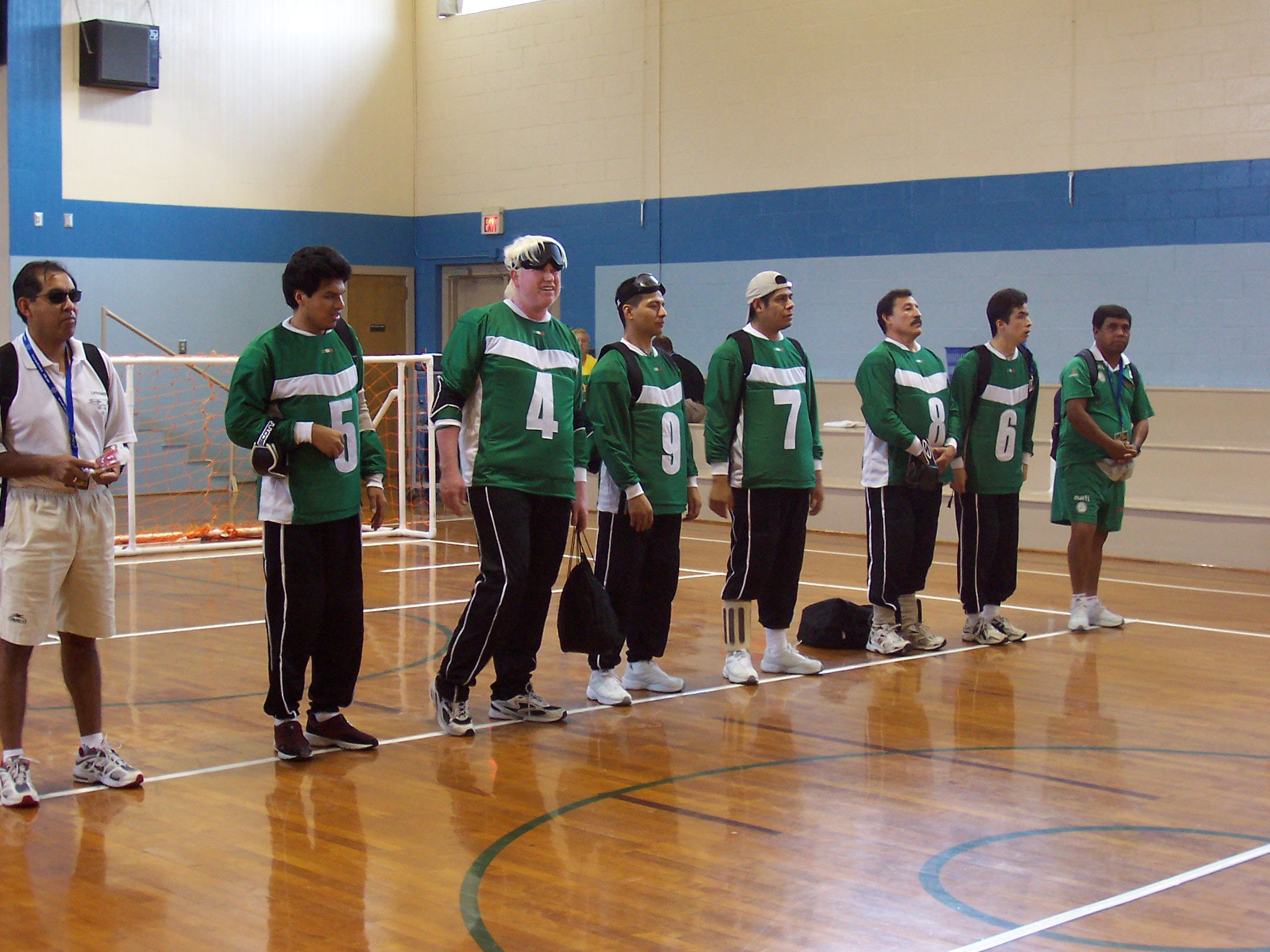
Mexico men's goalball team. Goalball World Championships, Spartanburg, South Carolina, USA (July 2006).

=== 1998 Madrid ===
The team competed in the 1998 World Championships, in Madrid, Spain. There were sixteen men's and eleven women's teams. The team finished last.

=== 2006 Spartanburg ===
The team competed in the 2006 World Championships, in July 2006, in Spartanburg, South Carolina, United States of America. There were sixteen men's and thirteen women's teams. The team finished last.

== IBSA World Games ==
=== 2003 Quebec City ===
The team competed in the 2003 IBSA World Games from Friday 1 to Sunday 10 August 2011, in Quebec City, Canada. Ten teams competed.

=== 2007 São Paulo ===
The team competed in the 2007 IBSA World Games, from 28 July 2007 to 8 August 2007, in São Paulo, Brazil. There were twenty-three men's and twelve women's teams. Athletes included Hector Carenõ Guendoly, and Edgardo Escalante Meza.

Completing in Group C, the team ranked fifth of six in the group, ahead of Iraq.

== Regional championships ==
The team competes in the IBSA America goalball region. The winner of the championships usually qualifies for a berth at the World Championships or the Paralympic Games.

=== 2005 São Paulo ===
The team competed at the 2005 IBSA Goalball Americas Regional Championships which were part of the Fourth IBSA Pan-American Games, the competition being from Monday 5 September 2005 to Friday 9 September 2005, in São Paulo, Brazil. There were five men's teams: Argentina, Brazil, Canada, Mexico, and USA.

Mexico came third behind USA and Canada.

=== 2011 Guadalajara ===
The team competed at the 2011 Parapan American Games from 13 to 19 November 2011, at the San Rafael Gymnasium in Guadalajara, Mexico. There were six men's teams: Argentina, Brazil, Canada, El Salvador, Mexico, USA.

Mexico came third behind USA and Brazil.

=== 2017 São Paulo ===
The team competed at the 2017 IBSA Goalball Americas Championships from Wednesday 29 November 2017 to Sunday 3 December 2017, at São Paulo, Brazil. There were eight men's teams: Argentina, Brazil, Canada, Costa Rica, Mexico, Peru, USA, and Venezuela (Costa Rica were disqualified for not having the minimum number of athletes to start a game).

The team ranked fifth.

=== 2019 Lima ===
The team competed at the 2019 Parapan American Games from 23 August 2019 to 1 September 2019, at the Miguel Grau Coliseum, Lima, Peru. This championships was a qualifier for the 2020 Paralympic Games. There were eight men's teams: Argentina, Brazil, Canada, Guatemala, Mexico, Peru, USA, Venezuela.

Mexico was not in the top four placed teams, losing in the quarter-finals 17:18 to Venezuela.

=== 2022 São Paulo ===
Due to the ongoing COVID-19 pandemic, the IBSA America championship moved from 6 to 13 November 2021, to 18 to 22 February 2022. The event is being held at the Centro de Treinamento Paralímpico (Paralympic Training Center) in São Paulo. This championships is a qualifier for the 2022 World Championships.

There are thirteen men's teams: Argentina, Brazil, Canada, Chile, Colombia, Costa Rica, Guatemala, Mexico, Nicaragua, Peru, Puerto Rico, USA, Venezuela.

The Mexico men's team has Vladimir Martínez López, Juan López Santiago, Ulises Francisco Martínez López, Vicente Trejo Perales, and Alexis Omar González Hernández.

== See also ==
- Disabled sports
- Mexico women's national goalball team
- Mexico at the Paralympics
