= John Kusku =

American Paralympic goalball player

Personal information
- Born: August 6, 1984 (age 42) Warren, Michigan, U.S.
- Height: 5 ft 11 in (180 cm)
- Weight: 180 lb (82 kg)

Sport
- Country: United States
- Sport: Goalball
- Disability: Retinitis pigmentosa
Medal record
Men's goalball
Representing United States
Paralympic Games
Silver medal – second place	2016 Rio de Janeiro	Team
World Championships
Bronze medal – third place	2014 Espoo	Team
Parapan American Games
Silver medal – second place	2011 Guadalajara	Team
Silver medal – second place	2015 Toronto	Team
Silver medal – second place	2019 Lima	Team

John Kusku (born August 6, 1984) is an American goalball player. His visual impairment is caused by retinitis pigmentosa. Kusku represented the United States at the 2016 Summer Paralympics and won a silver medal.

== Early life and education ==
Kusku was born with retinitis pigmentosa, diagnosed with a vision problem at six months old, and diagnosed with the condition at the age of four. He attended Warren Mott High School and went to Western Michigan University to study education, earning a master's degree in mathematics. He teaches high school math and physics.

== Career ==
Kusku represented the United States at the Parapan American Games and won a silver medal in 2011, 2015 and 2019.

He represented the United States at the 2016 Summer Paralympics in goalball and won a silver medal. He will again represent the United States at the 2020 Summer Paralympics.
