= Argentina men's national goalball team =

Argentina national team, for the Paralympic sport of goalball

Selección Argentina de Goalball
- Sport: Goalball
- League: IBSA
- Division: Men
- Region: IBSA America
- Location: Argentina
- Colours: Dark blue, white, light blue
- Head coach: Damián Pelozo
- Championships: Paralympic Games medals: :0:0:0; World Championship medals: :0:0:0

Argentina men's national goalball team is the men's national team of Argentina. Goalball is a team sport designed specifically for athletes with a vision impairment. The team takes part in international goalball competitions.

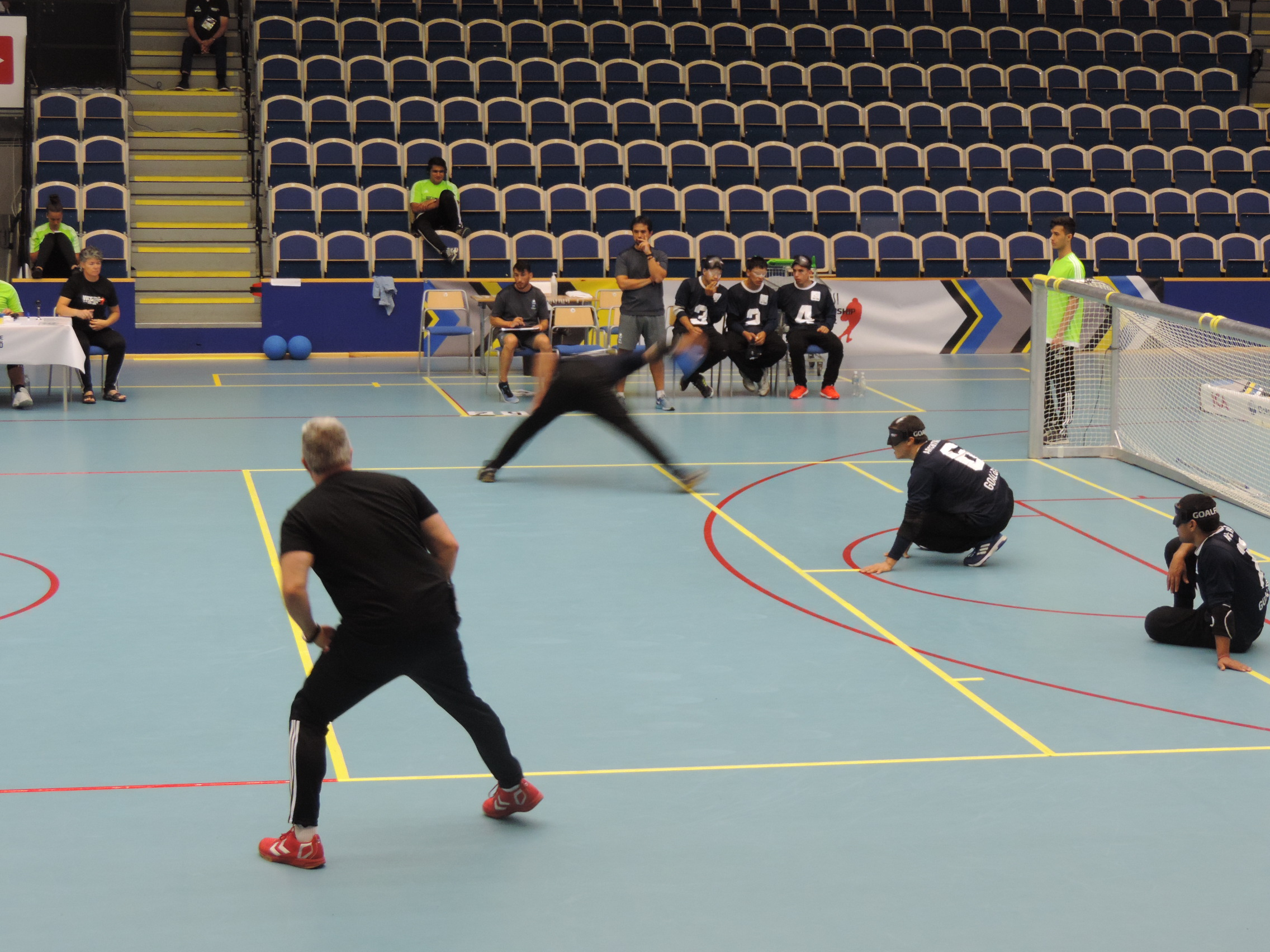
Argentina men's goalball team. Goalball World Championships, Malmö, Sweden (June 2018)

== World Championships ==
=== 2018 Malmö ===
The team competed in the 2018 World Championships from 3 to 8 June 2018, at the Baltiska Hallen, Malmö, Sweden. There were sixteen men's and twelve women's teams. They placed seventh in Pool A, and thirteenth in final standings.

Athletes included: Alejandro Almada, and Matias Fernando Britez.

=== 2022 Matosinhos ===
The team competed in the 2022 World Championships from 7 to 16 December 2022, at the Centro de Desportos e Congressos de Matosinhos, Portugal. There were sixteen men's and sixteen women's teams. They placed seventh in Pool D, and eleventh in final standings.

== IBSA World Games ==
=== 2007 São Paulo ===
The team competed in the 2007 IBSA World Games, from 28 July 2007 to 8 August 2007, in São Paulo, Brazil. There were twenty-three men's and twelve women's teams.

The team formed part of Group E, but did not make the quarter-finals. Team athletes included Matiaz Britez, Patricio Finoli, Luis Flores, and Diego Rodrigues.

== Regional championships ==
The team competes in the IBSA America goalball region. The winner of the championships usually qualifies for a berth at the World Championships or the Paralympic Games.

=== 2005 São Paulo ===
The team competed at the 2005 IBSA Goalball Americas Regional Championships which were part of the Fourth IBSA Pan-American Games, the competition being from Monday 5 September 2005 to Friday 9 September 2005, in São Paulo, Brazil. There were five men's and three women's teams. There were five men's teams: Argentina, Brazil, Canada, Mexico, and USA.

The team came fifth of the five countries.

=== 2017 São Paulo ===
The team competed at the 2017 IBSA Goalball Americas Championships from Wednesday 29 November 2017 to Sunday 3 December 2017, at São Paulo, Brazil. There were eight men's teams: Argentina, Brazil, Canada, Costa Rica, Mexico, Peru, USA, and Venezuela (Costa Rica were disqualified for not having the minimum number of athletes to start a game).

The team came fourth, behind Brazil, USA, and Canada.

=== 2019 Lima ===
The team competed at the 2019 Parapan American Games from 23 August 2019 to 1 September 2019, at the Miguel Grau Coliseum, Lima, Peru. This championships was a qualifier for the 2020 Paralympic Games. There were eight men's teams: Argentina, Brazil, Canada, Guatemala, Mexico, Peru, USA, Venezuela.

The team did not place in the top four.

=== 2022 São Paulo ===
Due to the ongoing COVID-19 pandemic, the IBSA America championships moved from 6 to 13 November 2021, to 18 to 22 February 2022. The event was held at the Centro de Treinamento Paralímpico (Paralympic Training Center) in São Paulo. This championships was a qualifier for the 2022 World Championships.

There are thirteen men's teams: Argentina, Brazil, Canada, Chile, Colombia, Costa Rica, Guatemala, Mexico, Nicaragua, Peru, Puerto Rico, USA, Venezuela.

The team played well in their round-robin games, with two mercies (Chile (14:4), Colombia (13:3)), beating two other teams (Nicaragua (13:5), Venezuela (7:6), and Peru (16:9)), but being mercied by the tournament's eventual gold medalists Brazil (4:14). Progressing into the quarter-finals, they were mercied by Canada (12:2), concluding with one minute left in the first half.

== See also ==
- Disabled sports
- Argentina women's national goalball team
- Argentina at the Paralympics
