= Leomon Moreno =

Brazilian goalball player

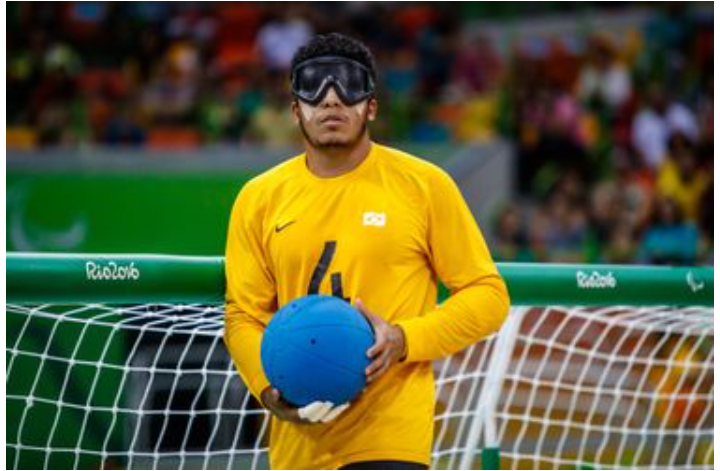

Personal information
- Full name: Leomon Moreno da Silva
- Born: 21 August 1993 (age 32) Brasília, Federal District, Brazil

Sport
- Country: Brazil
- Sport: Men's Goalball
- Disability class: B1
Medal record
Representing Brazil
Paralympic Games
Gold medal – first place	2020 Tokyo	Men's
Silver medal – second place	2012 London	Men's
Bronze medal – third place	2016 Rio	Men's
Bronze medal – third place	2024 Paris	Men's
World Championship
Gold medal – first place	2014 Espoo	Team
Gold medal – first place	2018 Malmö	Team
Gold medal – first place	2022 Matosinhos	Team
Bronze medal – third place	2026 Hangzhou	Team

Leomon Moreno da Silva (born 21 August 1993) is a member of Brazil men's national goalball team. He was on the team that won silver in Goalball at the 2012 Summer Paralympics, bronze in Goalball at the 2016 Summer Paralympics, and gold in Goalball at the 2020 Summer Paralympics. He has retinitis pigmentosa.
