= Goalball at the 2015 Parapan American Games =

- Venue: Mississauga Sports Centre
- Dates: 8–15 August 2015
- Competitors: 71 from 9 nations

Goalball event at the 2015 Parapan American Games was played from 8–15 August 2015 at the Mississauga Sports Centre in Toronto.

== Participating nations ==
- Argentina (6)
- Brazil (12)
- Canada (12)
- El Salvador (6)
- Nicaragua (6)
- Guatemala (6)
- Puerto Rico (5)
- United States (12)
- Venezuela (6)

== Men ==
=== Group stage ===
Team	Pld	W	D	L	GF	GA	GD	Pts	Qualification
Brazil	5	5	0	0	52	10	+42	15	Qualified for the semifinals
Canada	5	4	0	1	36	20	+16	12	Qualified for the semifinals
United States	5	3	0	2	40	27	+13	9	Qualified for the semifinals
Argentina	5	2	0	3	44	35	+9	6	Qualified for the semifinals
Venezuela	5	1	0	4	23	53	−30	3	
Puerto Rico	5	0	0	5	4	54	−50	0	

Source: results.toronto2015.org

=== Semifinals ===
Team 1	Score	Team 2
Brazil	9–4	Argentina
United States	3–2	Canada

=== Bronze Medal match ===
Team 1	Score	Team 2
Canada	13–3	Argentina

=== Gold Medal match ===
Team 1	Score	Team 2
Brazil	10–4	United States

== Women ==
=== Group stage ===
Team	Pld	W	D	L	GF	GA	GD	Pts	Qualification
Brazil	5	5	0	0	36	2	+34	15	Qualified for the semifinals
United States	5	4	0	1	36	5	+31	12	Qualified for the semifinals
Canada	5	3	0	2	33	8	+25	9	Qualified for the semifinals
Guatemala	5	2	0	3	19	36	−17	6	Qualified for the semifinals
Nicaragua	5	1	0	4	15	44	−29	3	
El Salvador	5	0	0	5	6	50	−44	0	

Source: results.toronto2015.org

=== Semifinals ===
Team 1	Score	Team 2
Brazil	10–0	Guatemala
United States	7–6	Canada

=== Bronze Medal match ===
Team 1	Score	Team 2
Canada	11–1	Guatemala

=== Gold Medal match ===
Team 1	Score	Team 2
Brazil	7–6	United States

== Medal summary ==
=== Medal table ===
Rank	Nation	Gold	Silver	Bronze	Total
1	Brazil	2	0	0	2
2	United States	0	2	0	2
3	Canada	0	0	2	2
Totals (3 entries)		2	2	2	6

=== Medal events ===
Event	Gold	Silver	Bronze
Men's	Brazil (BRA); Alexsander Almeida Maciel Celente; Josemarcio Da Silva Sousa; Alex De Melo Sousa; Jose Ferreira De Oliveira; Romario Marques; Leomon Moreno	United States (USA); Joseph Hamilton; Andrew Jenks; John Kusku; Donte' Mickens; Matt Simpson; Daryl Walker	Canada (CAN); Brendan Gaulin; Aron Ghebreyohannes; Bruno Haché; Blair Nesbitt; Simon Richard; Ahmad Zeividavi
Women's	Brazil (BRA); Victoria Amorim Do Nascimento; Simone Camargo Rocha; Neusimar Clemente Dos Santos; Ana Carolina Duarte; Jessica Gomes Vitorino; Gleyse Portioli Henrique	United States (USA); Jennifer Armbruster; Lisa Czechowski; Amanda Dennis; Marybai Huking; Eliana Mason; Asya Miller	Canada (CAN); Ashlie Andrews; Whitney Bogart; Tiana Knight; Jill Macsween; Nancy Morin; Cassie Orgeles
