= Daryl Walker =

American goalball player

Personal information
- Born: December 29, 1981 (age 44) Hoboken, New Jersey, U.S.
- Height: 5 ft 10 in (178 cm)
- Weight: 208 lb (94 kg)

Sport
- Country: United States
- Sport: Goalball
- Disability: Albinism
Medal record
Men's goalball
Representing United States
Paralympic Games
Silver medal – second place	2016 Rio de Janeiro	Team
World Championships
Bronze medal – third place	2006 Spartanburg	Team
Bronze medal – third place	2014 Espoo	Team
Parapan American Games
Silver medal – second place	2011 Guadalajara	Team
Silver medal – second place	2015 Toronto	Team
Silver medal – second place	2019 Lima	Team

Daryl Walker (born December 29, 1981) is an American goalball player who competes in international level events. He has participated at the Paralympic Games in 2008 and 2016 where he won a silver medal in the men's tournament. He is also a double Goalball World Championships bronze medalist as well as a triple Parapan American Games silver medalist.

Walker is an active member of The Church of Jesus Christ of Latter-day Saints, and met his wife, Melissa, on Mutual, a dating app for church members. They married in 2020.
