= United States Association of Blind Athletes =

Organization in Colorado, U.S.

United States Association of Blind Athletes (USABA)
- Website: https://www.usaba.org

The United States Association of Blind Athletes (USABA) is an organization founded in 1976 to increase the number and quality of world-class athletic opportunities for Americans who are blind or visually impaired. USABA has reached over 100,000 blind individuals, and have over 3,000 current members who compete in thirteen sports, most prominently goalball.

The USABA National Goalball Qualifier took place from June 21-23 at the Haddon Heights Community Center in Haddon Heights, New Jersey. The tournament saw an intense competition with a total of 21 teams divided across three divisions: a ten-team men’s top division, a six-team women’s division, and a five-team men’s B division.

== Overview ==
USABA is a Colorado-based organization whose mission is to empower U.S Americans who are blind or visually impaired and promote a healthy lifestyle by providing opportunities in sports, recreation, and other physical activities. Alongside this, USABA is focused on deconstructing misconceptions about the abilities of people who are blind or visually impaired by educating and inspiring the public through media outreach. USABA is open to any aspiring or current athletes who are blind or visually impaired, coaches, volunteers, or supporters who wish to involve themselves in this community.

== History ==
USABA was founded by Dr. Charles Buell in 1976. That year, the first Olympiad for the Disabled was hosted in Toronto, Canada, with 27 men and women representing the United States. After this event, a group of national leaders, coaches, and educators began to discuss the importance of an organization specifically focused on promoting and sponsoring competitions for people who are blind or visually impaired. This led to the creation of USABA.

Other original founding members include Arthur Copeland, Judy Whyte, and Lou Moneymaker.

== Sports ==
USABA supports 13 different sports, including:

- Beep baseball
- Bowling
- Cycling
- 5-a-side soccer
- Goalball
- Ice hockey
- Judo
- Powerlifting
- Rowing
- Skiing
- Swimming
- Track and field
- Military sports

The most prominent sport is goalball, which was designed specifically for blind athlete

== Events ==
USABA hosts various events, including development camps, national championships, and competitions such as the Paralympic Games. Past events include the 1987 Can-Am Pacific Games, the 1992 Youth Championships, and the 1984 International Games for the Disabled. More recently, USABA has partnered with the Anthem Foundation to launch the National Fitness Challenge, aimed at encouraging physical activity among visually impaired individuals. USABA also promotes National Blind Sports Day, which raises awareness about sports opportunities for the blind..

== Awards and recognition ==
In 2019, USABA received the Dr. Jacob Bolotin Award from the National Federation of the Blind, which honors organizations contributing to the blind community. USABA is also recognized as a High Performance Management Organization by the Paralympic Games.

== Sponsors & Partnered Associations ==
USABA collaborates with organizations such as the United States Paralympic Team, the Anthem Foundation, the Department of Veterans Affairs, and the National Industries for the Blind. It also works with groups like Ski for Light and the International Blind Sports Federation on specific events.

== Scholarship program ==
Each year, USABA offers scholarships, including the I C You Foundation Valor Achievement Award and the Arthur E. and Helen Copeland Scholarship, to support blind or visually impaired students.
