= Goalball at the 2012 Summer Paralympics – Men's team rosters =

This article shows the rosters of all participating teams at the men's goalball tournament at the 2012 Summer Paralympics in London.

== Pool A ==
=== Brazil ===
The following is the Brazil roster in the men's goalball tournament of the 2012 Summer Paralympics.

No.	Player	Age
1	José Roberto Ferreira de Oliveira	31
3	Alexsander Almeida Maciel Celente	31
4	Leomon Moreno da Silva	19
6	Romário Diego Marques	23
7	Filippe Santos Silvestre	30
9	Leandro Moreno da Silva	24

=== Finland ===
The following is the Finland roster in the men's goalball tournament of the 2012 Summer Paralympics.

No.	Player	Age
1	Jarno Mattila	27
2	Ville Montonen	26
4	Erkki Miinala	26
6	Toni Alenius	26
7	Tuomas Nousu	26
9	Petri Posio	29

=== Great Britain ===
The following is the Great Britain roster in the men's goalball tournament of the 2012 Summer Paralympics.

No.	Player	Age
1	Simon Goodall	43
2	Joe Dodson	27
3	Michael Sharkey	27
4	Adam Knott	18
5	David Knott	15
6	Niall Graham	20

=== Lithuania ===
The following is the Lithuania roster in the men's goalball tournament of the 2012 Summer Paralympics.

No.	Player	Age
1	Nerijus Montvydas	27
3	Arvydas Juchna	28
5	Saulius Leonavicius	39
6	Mantas Panovas	23
7	Genrik Pavliukianec	36
8	Marius Zibolis	37

=== Sweden ===
The following is the Sweden roster in the men's goalball tournament of the 2012 Summer Paralympics.

No.	Player	Age
1	Fatmir Seremeti	29
2	Magnus Rendahl	21
3	Stefan Gahne	30
4	Niklas Hultqvist	29
7	Mikael Åkerberg	30
9	Piotr Lawniczak	31

=== Turkey ===
The following is the Turkey roster in the men's goalball tournament of the 2012 Summer Paralympics.

No.	Player	Age
1	Tekin Okan Düzgün	24
2	Hüseyin Alkan	24
3	Mehmet Cesur	30
5	Yusuf Uçar	25
6	Abdullah Aydoğdu	21
7	Tuncay Karakaya	23

== Pool B ==
=== Algeria ===
The following is the Algeria roster in the men's goalball tournament of the 2012 Summer Paralympics.

No.	Player	Age
1	Mohamed Ouali	38
2	Firas Bentria	26
3	Ishak Boutaleb	25
5	Imad Eddine Godmane	21
7	Abdelhalim Larbi	28
9	Mohamed Mokrane	37

=== Belgium ===
The following is the Belgium roster in the men's goalball tournament of the 2012 Summer Paralympics.

No.	Player	Age
2	Johan de Rick	41
3	Bruno Vanhove	29
4	Youssef Bihi	35
5	Klison Mapreni	20
6	Tom Vanhove	29
7	Glenn Van Thournout	29

=== Canada ===
The following is the Canada roster in the men's goalball tournament of the 2012 Summer Paralympics.

No.	Player	Age
1	Ahmad Zeividavi	27
3	Brendan Gaulin	23
4	Simon Tremblay	30
5	Bruno Hache	35
7	Mario Caron	50
8	Doug Ripley	38

=== China ===
The following is the China roster in the men's goalball tournament of the 2012 Summer Paralympics.

No.	Player	Age
1	Yao Yongquan	25
2	Cai Changgui	29
3	Bao Daolei	24
4	Chen Liangliang	28
6	Shao Shuai	25
7	Du Jinran	26

=== Iran ===
The following is the Iran roster in the men's goalball tournament of the 2012 Summer Paralympics.

No.	Player	Age
1	Seyed Mehdi Sayahi	26
2	Mostafa Shahbazi Yajlou	23
3	Hassan Jafari	22
5	Javad Shirdel	21

=== South Korea ===
The following is the South Korea roster in the men's goalball tournament of the 2012 Summer Paralympics.

No.	Player	Age
1	Kim Nam-Oh	21
2	Hong Sung-Wook	23
4	Oh Jung-Whan	32
5	Bang Cheong-Sik	25
7	Kim Chul-Hwan	32
8	Kim Byeong-Hoon	30

== See also ==
- Goalball at the 2012 Summer Paralympics – Women's team rosters
