= Goalball at the 2012 Summer Paralympics – Men's tournament =

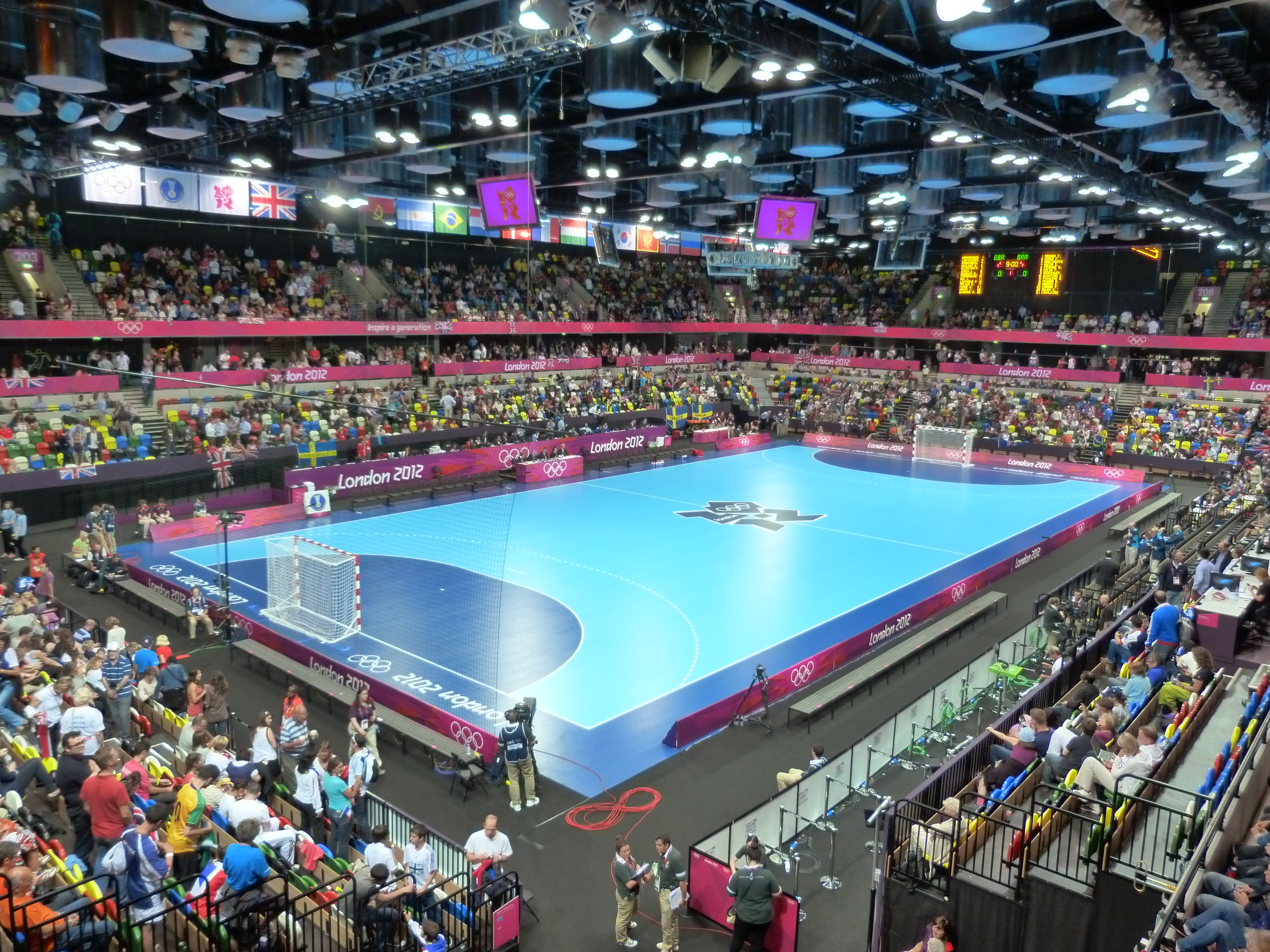
Goalball at the 2012 Summer Paralympics was held at the Copper Box.

The men's tournament in goalball at the 2012 Summer Paralympics was contested from 30 August to 7 September. 38 matches were played; 30 in the group play, 4 quarter-finals, 2 semi-finals, a bronze medal match, and a gold medal match.

Twelve teams participated, with six athletes per team. Finland won the gold medal by beating Brazil in the final, while Turkey beat Lithuania in the match for bronze.

== Competition format ==
The teams were divided into two equal groups for a single round robin group stage. The top four teams of each group advanced to the quarter-finals. All matches in the second stage were knock-out format.

=== Participating teams ===
Group A

- Brazil (roster)
- Finland (roster)
- Great Britain (roster)
- Lithuania (roster)
- Sweden (roster)
- Turkey (roster)

Group B

- Algeria (roster)
- Belgium (roster)
- Canada (roster)
- China (roster)
- Iran (roster)
- South Korea (roster)

=== Venue ===
All matches were played in the Copper Box.

== Preliminary round ==
All times are local (BST/UTC+1)

=== Group A ===
Team	Pld	W	D	L	GF	GA	GD	Pts	Qualification
Turkey	5	4	1	0	26	6	+20	13	Quarterfinals
Brazil	5	3	0	2	30	20	+10	9	Quarterfinals
Lithuania	5	2	2	1	33	20	+13	8	Quarterfinals
Finland	5	2	0	3	16	24	−8	6	Quarterfinals
Sweden	5	1	2	2	16	25	−9	5	Eliminated
Great Britain	5	0	1	4	9	35	−26	1	Eliminated

Source: "London 2012 Paralympic Games - Goalball results" (PDF). Paralympic.org. 2012-10-03 – via Goalball.sport.

30 August 2012; 09:00	Lithuania	11 – 1	Great Britain	Copper Box, London; Referees: Bülent Kimyon (TUR), Kimberly Anderson (USA)
30 August 2012; 09:00	Pavliukianec 4 Zibolis 3 Juchna 2 Panovas 2	Report	Sharkey 1	Copper Box, London; Referees: Bülent Kimyon (TUR), Kimberly Anderson (USA)

30 August 2012; 10:15	Finland	5 – 6	Brazil	Copper Box, London; Referees: Launel Scott (CAN), Thomas Baerz (GER)
30 August 2012; 10:15	Alenius 3 Mattila 1 Minala 1	Report	Marques 4 Silvestre 2	Copper Box, London; Referees: Launel Scott (CAN), Thomas Baerz (GER)

30 August 2012; 11:30	Turkey	9 – 2	Sweden	Copper Box, London; Referees: Shinji Mizuno (JPN), Carla Da Matta (BRA)
30 August 2012; 11:30	Alkan 3 Düzgün 3 Uçar 2 Karakaya 1	Report	Seremati 2	Copper Box, London; Referees: Shinji Mizuno (JPN), Carla Da Matta (BRA)

31 August 2012; 10:15	Lithuania	10 – 0	Finland	Copper Box, London; Referees: Dawna Christy (CAN), Warrick Jackes (AUS)
31 August 2012; 10:15	Pavliukianec 5 Juchna 3 Leonavicius 1 Zibolis 1	Report		Copper Box, London; Referees: Dawna Christy (CAN), Warrick Jackes (AUS)

31 August 2012; 11:30	Great Britain	1 – 7	Turkey	Copper Box, London; Referees: Vilma Venckutonyte (LTU), Janne Ahokas (FIN)
31 August 2012; 11:30	Sharkey 1	Report	Karakaya 4 Alkan 2 Düzgün 1	Copper Box, London; Referees: Vilma Venckutonyte (LTU), Janne Ahokas (FIN)

31 August 2012; 13:45	Brazil	4 – 5	Sweden	Copper Box, London; Referees: Christl Daentler (GER), Tony Connolly (USA)
31 August 2012; 13:45	Leo. Moreno da Silva 2 Marques 1 Santos Silvestre 1	Report	Hultqvist 4 Gahne 1	Copper Box, London; Referees: Christl Daentler (GER), Tony Connolly (USA)

1 September 2012; 09:00	Turkey	4 – 0	Finland	Copper Box, London; Referees: Shinji Mizuno (JPN), Carla Da Matta (BRA)
1 September 2012; 09:00	Karakaya 3 Düzgün 1	Report		Copper Box, London; Referees: Shinji Mizuno (JPN), Carla Da Matta (BRA)

1 September 2012; 10:15	Sweden	3 – 3	Great Britain	Copper Box, London; Referees: Bülent Kimyon (TUR), Kimberly Anderson (USA)
1 September 2012; 10:15	Hultqvist 2 Seremati 1	Report	Graham 1 Knott 1 Sharkey 1	Copper Box, London; Referees: Bülent Kimyon (TUR), Kimberly Anderson (USA)

1 September 2012; 11:30	Brazil	12 – 5	Lithuania	Copper Box, London; Referees: Thomas Baerz (GER), Launel Scott (CAN)
1 September 2012; 11:30	Marques 10; Almeida Maciel Celente 2	Report	Montvydas 2 Pavliuklianec 2 Panovas 1	Copper Box, London; Referees: Thomas Baerz (GER), Launel Scott (CAN)

2 September 2012; 18:30	Great Britain	3 – 7	Finland	Copper Box, London; Referees: Warrick Jackes (AUS), Yasser Omar (EGY)
2 September 2012; 18:30	Knott 3	Report	Mattila 4 Montonen 1 Miinala 1 Posio 1	Copper Box, London; Referees: Warrick Jackes (AUS), Yasser Omar (EGY)

2 September 2012; 19:45	Sweden	5 – 5	Lithuania	Copper Box, London; Referees: Janne Ahokas (FIN), Hooshang Shariati (IRI)
2 September 2012; 19:45	Seremati 5	Report	Pavliukianec 2 Panovas 2 Juchna 1	Copper Box, London; Referees: Janne Ahokas (FIN), Hooshang Shariati (IRI)

2 September 2012; 21:00	Turkey	4 – 1	Brazil	Copper Box, London; Referees: Dawna Christy (CAN), Vilma Venckutonyte (LTU)
2 September 2012; 21:00	Karakaya 2 Alkan 2	Report	Marques 1	Copper Box, London; Referees: Dawna Christy (CAN), Vilma Venckutonyte (LTU)

4 September 2012; 17:15	Finland	4 – 1	Sweden	Copper Box, London; Referees: Hooshang Shariati (IRI), Dawna Christy (CAN)
4 September 2012; 17:15	Mattila 4	Report	Seremeti 1	Copper Box, London; Referees: Hooshang Shariati (IRI), Dawna Christy (CAN)

4 September 2012; 18:30	Great Britain	1 – 7	Brazil	Copper Box, London; Referees: Janne Ahokas (FIN), Vilma Venckutonyte (LTU)
4 September 2012; 18:30	Knott 1	Report	Marques 4 Celente 2 Silvestre 1	Copper Box, London; Referees: Janne Ahokas (FIN), Vilma Venckutonyte (LTU)

4 September 2012; 19:45	Lithuania	2 – 2	Turkey	Copper Box, London; Referees: Hooshang Shariati (IRI), Dawna Christy (CAN)
4 September 2012; 19:45	Zibolis 2	Report	Alkan 1 Karakaya 1	Copper Box, London; Referees: Hooshang Shariati (IRI), Dawna Christy (CAN)

=== Group B ===
Team	Pld	W	D	L	GF	GA	GD	Pts	Qualification
Iran	5	4	0	1	32	20	+12	12	Quarterfinals
China	5	3	1	1	20	14	+6	10	Quarterfinals
Belgium	5	3	1	1	19	16	+3	10	Quarterfinals
Algeria	5	2	0	3	18	17	+1	6	Quarterfinals
South Korea	5	1	0	4	18	28	−10	3	Eliminated
Canada	5	1	0	4	16	28	−12	3	Eliminated

Source: "London 2012 Paralympic Games - Goalball results" (PDF). Paralympic.org. 2012-10-03 – via Goalball.sport.

30 August 2012; 13:45	China	5 – 9	Iran	Copper Box, London; Referees: Launel Scott (CAN), Bülent Kimyon (TUR)
30 August 2012; 13:45	Yao 3 Chen 2	Report	Sayahi 9	Copper Box, London; Referees: Launel Scott (CAN), Bülent Kimyon (TUR)

30 August 2012; 15:00	South Korea	4 – 3	Algeria	Copper Box, London; Referees: Kimberly Anderson (USA), Carla Da Matta (BRA)
30 August 2012; 15:00	Hong 4	Report	Mokrane 2 Larbi 1	Copper Box, London; Referees: Kimberly Anderson (USA), Carla Da Matta (BRA)

30 August 2012; 16:15	Canada	2 – 4	Belgium	Copper Box, London; Referees: Thomas Baerz (GER) Shinji Mizuno (JPN)
30 August 2012; 16:15	Caron 2	Report	de Rick 2 Vanhove 1 Bihi 1	Copper Box, London; Referees: Thomas Baerz (GER) Shinji Mizuno (JPN)

31 August 2012; 18:30	China	11 – 4	South Korea	Copper Box, London; Referees: Morten Hammershoi (DEN), Christl Daentler (GER)
31 August 2012; 18:30	Yao 6 Chen 5	Report	C-H Kim 2 N-O Kim 1 Hong 1	Copper Box, London; Referees: Morten Hammershoi (DEN), Christl Daentler (GER)

31 August 2012; 19:45	Iran	9 – 2	Canada	Copper Box, London; Referees: Dina Murdie (GBR), Tony Connolly (USA)
31 August 2012; 19:45	Jafari 4 Sayahi 3 Shahbazi 1 Shirdel 1	Report	Gaulin 2	Copper Box, London; Referees: Dina Murdie (GBR), Tony Connolly (USA)

31 August 2012; 21:00	Algeria	5 – 2	Belgium	Copper Box, London; Referees: Ali Aldarsony (KSA), Juha Vuokila (FIN)
31 August 2012; 21:00	Mokrane 3 Larbi 2	Report	de Rick 1 Bihi 1	Copper Box, London; Referees: Ali Aldarsony (KSA), Juha Vuokila (FIN)

1 September 2012; 16:15	Canada	5 – 4	South Korea	Copper Box, London; Referees: Kimberly Anderson (USA), Shinji Mizuno (JPN)
1 September 2012; 16:15	Gaulin 3 Caron 2	Report	C-H Kim 2 Hong 1 J-W Oh 1	Copper Box, London; Referees: Kimberly Anderson (USA), Shinji Mizuno (JPN)

1 September 2012; 18:30	Belgium	8 – 6	Iran	Copper Box, London; Referees: Morten Hammershoi (DEN), Juha Vuokila (FIN)
1 September 2012; 18:30	de Rick 3 Bihi 3 Vanhove 1 Mapreni 1	Report	Sayahi 3 Jafari 2 Shahbazi 1	Copper Box, London; Referees: Morten Hammershoi (DEN), Juha Vuokila (FIN)

1 September 2012; 19:45	Algeria	0 – 1	China	Copper Box, London; Referees: Dina Murdie (GBR), Ali Aldarsony (KSA)
1 September 2012; 19:45		Report	Yao 1	Copper Box, London; Referees: Dina Murdie (GBR), Ali Aldarsony (KSA)

2 September 2012; 13:45	Iran	4 – 3	South Korea	Copper Box, London; Referees: Janne Ahokas (FIN), Dawna Christy (CAN)
2 September 2012; 13:45	Sayahi 4	Report	Hong SW 2 Kim CH 1	Copper Box, London; Referees: Janne Ahokas (FIN), Dawna Christy (CAN)

2 September 2012; 15:00	Belgium	0 – 0	China	Copper Box, London; Referees: Hooshang Shariati (IRI), Warrick Jackes (AUS)
2 September 2012; 15:00		Report		Copper Box, London; Referees: Hooshang Shariati (IRI), Warrick Jackes (AUS)

2 September 2012; 16:15	Canada	6 – 8	Algeria	Copper Box, London; Referees: Vilma Venckutonyte (LTU), Yasser Omar (EGY)
2 September 2012; 16:15	Caron 4 Gaulin 2	Report	Mokrane 8	Copper Box, London; Referees: Vilma Venckutonyte (LTU), Yasser Omar (EGY)

3 September 2012; 09:00	South Korea	3 – 5	Belgium	Copper Box, London; Referees: Juha Vuokila (FIN), Morten Hammershoi (DEN)
3 September 2012; 09:00	Kim C.-H. 2 Hong 1	Report	B. Vanhove 2 Bihi 2 Mapreni 1	Copper Box, London; Referees: Juha Vuokila (FIN), Morten Hammershoi (DEN)

3 September 2012; 10:15	Iran	4 – 2	Algeria	Copper Box, London; Referees: Dina Murdie (GBR), Tony Connolly (USA)
3 September 2012; 10:15	Sayahi 2 Jafari 1 Shirdel 1	Report	Mokrane 2	Copper Box, London; Referees: Dina Murdie (GBR), Tony Connolly (USA)

3 September 2012; 11:30	China	3 – 1	Canada	Copper Box, London; Referees: Ali Aldarsony (KSA), Christl Daentler (GER)
3 September 2012; 11:30	Chen 2 Yao 1	Report	Gaulin 1	Copper Box, London; Referees: Ali Aldarsony (KSA), Christl Daentler (GER)

== Knock-out round ==
Quarterfinals
A2	Brazil	3
B3	Belgium	0
B2	China	4
A3	Lithuania	12
A1	Turkey	3
B4	Algeria	1
B1	Iran	1
A4	Finland	5

Semifinals
Brazil	2
Lithuania	1
Turkey	0
Finland	2

Finals
Brazil	1
Finland	8
Third place
Lithuania	1
Turkey	4

=== Quarter-finals ===
5 September 2012; 15:45	Turkey	3 – 1	Algeria	Copper Box, London; Referees: Juha Vuokila (FIN), Dawna Christy (CAN)
5 September 2012; 15:45	Karakaya 3	Report	Mokrane 1	Copper Box, London; Referees: Juha Vuokila (FIN), Dawna Christy (CAN)

5 September 2012; 18:00	China	4 – 12	Lithuania	Copper Box, London; Referees: Bülent Kimyon (TUR), Carla Da Matta (BRA)
5 September 2012; 18:00	Chen 2 Yongquan 2	Report	Zibolis 6 Juchna 4 Leonavičius 1 Pavliukianec 1	Copper Box, London; Referees: Bülent Kimyon (TUR), Carla Da Matta (BRA)

5 September 2012; 19:30	Brazil	3 – 0	Belgium	Copper Box, London; Referees: Tony Connolly (USA), Vilma Venckutonyte (LTU)
5 September 2012; 19:30	Marques 2 Almeida Maciel Celente 1	Report		Copper Box, London; Referees: Tony Connolly (USA), Vilma Venckutonyte (LTU)

5 September 2012; 21:00	Iran	1 – 5	Finland	Copper Box, London; Referees: Morten Hammershoi (DEN), Kimberly Anderson (USA)
5 September 2012; 21:00	Sayahi 1	Report	Posio 3 Mattila 2	Copper Box, London; Referees: Morten Hammershoi (DEN), Kimberly Anderson (USA)

=== Semi-finals ===
6 September 2012; 18:30	Turkey	0 – 2	Finland	Copper Box, London; Referees: Tony Connolly (USA), Yasser Omar (EGY)
6 September 2012; 18:30		Report	Mattila 2	Copper Box, London; Referees: Tony Connolly (USA), Yasser Omar (EGY)

6 September 2012; 20:00	Brazil	2 – 1	Lithuania	Copper Box, London; Referees: Janne Ahokas (FIN), Shinji Mizuno (JPN)
6 September 2012; 20:00	Almeida Maciel Celente 1 Marques 1	Report	Leonavičius 1	Copper Box, London; Referees: Janne Ahokas (FIN), Shinji Mizuno (JPN)

=== Bronze medal match ===
7 September 2012; 18:30	Lithuania	1 – 4	Turkey	Copper Box, London; Referees: Juha Vuokila (FIN), Yasser Omar (EGY)
7 September 2012; 18:30	Zibolis 1	Report	Karakaya 4	Copper Box, London; Referees: Juha Vuokila (FIN), Yasser Omar (EGY)

=== Gold medal match ===
7 September 2012; 20:00	Brazil	1 – 8	Finland	Copper Box, London; Referees: Bülent Kimyon (TUR), Tony Connolly (USA)
7 September 2012; 20:00	Leo. Moreno da Silva 1	Report	Posio 4 Mattila 3 Miinala 1	Copper Box, London; Referees: Bülent Kimyon (TUR), Tony Connolly (USA)

== Final rankings ==
Rank	Team
Gold medal	Finland
Silver medal	Brazil
Bronze medal	Turkey
4.	Lithuania
5.	Iran
6.	China
7.	Belgium
8.	Algeria
9.	Sweden
10.	Canada
11.	South Korea
12.	Great Britain

2012 men's Paralympic champions

Finland
Second title

== Statistics ==
=== Leading goalscorers ===
Rank	Player	MP	G	P	T
1	Romário Diego Marques (BRA)	8	14	9	23
2	Seyed Mehdi Sayahi (IRI)	6	18	4	22
3	Tuncay Karakaya (TUR)	8	11	8	19
4	Jarno Mattila (FIN)	8	11	5	16
4	Mohamed Mokrane (ALG)	6	9	7	16
6	Genrik Pavliuklianec (LTU)	8	13	2	15
7	Marius Zibolis (LTU)	8	7	6	13
8	Yao Yongquan (CHN)	6	9	3	12
9	Chen Liangliang (CHN)	6	9	2	11
10	Arvydas Juchna (LTU)	8	9	1	10

== See also ==
- Goalball at the 2012 Summer Paralympics – Women's tournament
