= Judo at the 2008 Summer Paralympics – Women's +70 kg =

The women's +70 kg judo competition at the 2008 Summer Paralympics was held on September 9 at the Beijing Workers' Gymnasium. Preliminary rounds started at 12:00 pm CST. Repechage finals, semifinals, bouts for bronze medals, and the final were held at 5:30 pm CST.

This event was the heaviest of the women's judo weight classes, allowing competitors with over 70 kilograms of body mass. Like all other judo events, bouts lasted five minutes. If the bout was still tied at the end, it was extended for another five-minute, sudden-death period; if neither judoka scored during that period, the match is decided by the judges. The tournament bracket consisted of a single-elimination contest culminating in a gold medal match. There was also a repechage to determine the winners of the two bronze medals. Each judoka who had lost to a semifinalist competed in the repechage. The two judokas who lost in the semifinals faced the winner of the opposite half of the bracket's repechage in bronze medal bouts.

A total of seven judokas competed in the event. An eighth competitor, Anayasi Hernandez of Cuba, was disqualified for failing a pre-match medical exam. Her first round bout against Zoubida Bouazoug of Algeria was canceled, and Bouazoug received a bye into the next round.

== Medalists ==
Gold	Yuan Yanping; China
Silver	Deanne Silva; Brazil
Bronze	Irina Kalyanova; Russia
Bronze	Zoubida Bouazoug; Algeria

== Tournament results ==
First Round
Zoubida Bouazoug (ALG)
Bye
Irina Kalyanova (RUS)	0000^{4}
Yuan Yanping (CHN)	1000
Sara de Pinies (ESP)	0010
Deanne Silva (BRA)	1000
Rikei Komatsu (JPN)	1011
Celine Manzuoli (FRA)	0010

Semifinals
Zoubida Bouazoug (ALG)	0000
Yuan Yanping (CHN)	1010
Deanne Silva (BRA)	1011
Rikei Komatsu (JPN)	0000^{1}

Final
Yuan Yanping (CHN)	1010
Deanne Silva (BRA)	0000

=== Repechage ===
Semifinals
Irina Kalyanova (RUS)
Bye
Sara de Pinies (ESP)	1030
Celine Manzuoli (FRA)	0000

Bronze medal finals
Irina Kalyanova (RUS)	0201
Rikei Komatsu (JPN)	0000^{1}
Sara de Pinies (ESP)	0001
Zoubida Bouazoug (ALG)	0201^{1}
