= Zoubida Bouazoug =

Algerian judoka (born 1976)

Personal information
- National team: Algeria
- Born: January 25, 1976 (age 50)
- Occupation: Judoka

Sport
- Country: Algeria
- Sport: Judo
- Disability: Visual impairment
- Weight class: +75 kg
Medal record
Women's judo
Representing Algeria
IBSA World Games
Silver medal – second place	2011 Antalya	Under 78 kg
Paralympic Games
Bronze medal – third place	2008 Beijing	+ 70 kg
Bronze medal – third place	2012 London	+ 70 kg

Profile at external databases
- JudoInside.com: 89729
- Updated on November 11, 2017

Zoubida Bouazoug (born 25 January 1976) is an Algerian judoka who won bronze medals in the + 70 kg weight class at both the 2008 and 2012 Summer Paralympics.

== Career ==
Zoubida Bouazoug was born on 25 January 1976, and went on to represent Algeria in judo. She took part in the women's +70 kg tournament at the 2008 Summer Paralympics in Beijing, China. She received a bye through the first round, and faced Chinese judoka Yuan Yanping in the semi-final. Bouazoug lost the match, and instead faced Sara de Pinies of Spain in a bronze medal match. She won the bout and the medal.

At the IBSA World Games in Antalya, Turkey, Bouazoug competed in both the + 70 kg and under 78 kg classes. She finished fifth in the + 70 kg class, and won a silver medal in the under 78 kg class. Competing at the 2012 Paralympic Games in London, England, Bouazoug fought Yanping in the first round, who had gone on to win the gold medal in Beijing. Yanping defeated Bouazoug and went on retain her title in London. Bouazoug meanwhile worked her way through the repechage. She fought for a bronze medal against Celine Manzuoli of France. Bouazoug won the match and the medal, defeating Manzuoli by waza-ari.
