= Turkey at the 2012 Summer Paralympics =

- IPC code: TUR
- NPC: Turkish Paralympic Committee
- Website: www.tmpk.org.tr (in Turkish)

in London
- Competitors: 69 in 10 sports
- Flag bearers: Gizem Girişmen (opening); Nazmiye Muslu (closing)
- Medals Ranked 43rd: Gold 1 Silver 5 Bronze 4 Total 10

Summer Paralympics appearances (overview)
- 1992; 1996; 2000; 2004; 2008; 2012; 2016; 2020; 2024

Turkey competed at the 2012 Summer Paralympics in London, United Kingdom, from 29 August to 9 September 2012.

== Medallists ==
Medal	Name	Sport	Event	Date
Gold	Nazmiye Muslu	Powerlifting	Women's 40 kg	30 August
Silver	Çiğdem Dede	Powerlifting	Women's 44 kg	31 August
Silver	Korhan Yamaç	Shooting	Men's 10 metre air pistol SH1	30 August
Silver	Nazan Akın	Judo	Women's +70 kg	1 September
Silver	Neslihan Kavas	Table tennis	Women's individual - Class 9	3 September
Silver	Neslihan Kavas; Kübra Öçsoy; Ümran Ertiş	Table tennis	Women's team class 6-10	8 September
Bronze	Doğan Hancı	Archery	Men's individual compound	3 September
Bronze	Abdullah Aydoğdu; Hüseyin Alkan; Mehmet Cesur; Tekin Okan Düzgün; Tuncay Karakaya; Yusuf Uçar	Goalball	Men's tournament	7 September
Bronze	Duygu Çete	Judo	Women's 57 kg	31 August
Bronze	Özlem Becerikli	Powerlifting	Women's 56 kg	2 September

=== Multiple medalists ===
Multiple medalists
Name	Sport	1st place, gold medalist(s)	2nd place, silver medalist(s)	3rd place, bronze medalist(s)	Total
Neslihan Kavas	Table Tennis	0	2	0	2

== Archery ==
Men

Athlete	Event	Ranking round		Round of 32	Round of 16	Quarterfinals	Semifinals	Finals	
Athlete	Event	Score	Seed	Opposition score	Opposition score	Opposition score	Opposition score	Opposition score	Rank
Erdoğan Aygan	Ind. compound open	637	18	Johansen (NOR); W 6–0	Forsberg (FIN); L 4–6	Did not advance			
Doğan Hancı	Ind. compound open	671	3	Bye	Larsson (SWE); W 7–1	Kascak (SVK); W 7–3	Forsberg (FIN); L 3–7	Rodriguez (ESP); W 6–2	3rd place, bronze medalist(s)
Abdullah Şener	Ind. compound open	588	28	Simonelli (ITA); L 4–6	Did not advance				
Mustafa Demir	Ind. recurve W1/W2	569	17	Mat Zin (MAS); W 6–4	Tseng (TPE); L 2–6	Did not advance			
Özgür Özen	Ind. recurve W1/W2	597	10	Chung (TPE); W 6–2	Shahabipour (IRI); L 0–6	Did not advance			
Zafer Korkmaz	Ind. recurve standing	588	17	Kim (KOR); W 6–0	Allen (GBR); W 6–4	Shestakov (RUS); L 4–6	Did not advance		
Oğuzhan Polat	Ind. recurve standing	588	19	Patryas (POL); W 6–2	Bottomley (GBR); W 6–4	Bennett (USA); L 3–7	Did not advance		
Mustafa Demir; Zafer Korkmaz; Özgür Özen; Oğuzhan Polat	Team recurve open	1773	7	—N/a	Malaysia (MAS); W 197–190	Russia (RUS); L 199–212	Did not advance		

Women

Athlete	Event	Ranking round		Round of 32	Round of 16	Quarterfinals	Semifinals	Finals	
Athlete	Event	Score	Seed	Opposition score	Opposition score	Opposition score	Opposition score	Opposition score	Rank
Gülbin Su	Ind. compound open	615	11	—N/a	Markitantova (UKR); W 6–4	Lyzhnikova (RUS); L 0–6	Did not advance		
Hatice Bayar	Ind. recurve W1/W2	498	13	Tremblay (CAN); W 6–0	Dzoba-Balian (UKR); W 6–4	Mijno (ITA); L 2–6	Did not advance		
Özlem Hacer Kalay	Ind. recurve W1/W2	537	7	Bye	Sinisalo (FIN); W 6–2	Floreno (ITA); L 2–6	Did not advance		
Gizem Girişmen	Ind. recurve W1/W2	533	9	Bye	Murray (GBR); W 7–1	Nemati (IRI); L 0–6	Did not advance		
Hatice Bayar; Özlem Hacer Kalay; Gizem Girişmen	Team recurve open	1568	5	—N/a		Italy (ITA); L 175–183	Did not advance		

== Athletics ==
Men

Athlete	Event	Heat		Semifinal		Final	
Athlete	Event	Result	Rank	Result	Rank	Result	Rank
Mehmet Nesim Öner	400 m T12	52.53 SB	3	did not advance			
Mehmet Nesim Öner	800 m T12	1:57.40 PB	2	—N/a		did not advance	
Semih Deniz	400 m T12	DQ		did not advance			
Semih Deniz	800 m T12	1:57.03	3	—N/a		Did not advance	
Semih Deniz	1500 m T13	4:01.91 PB	7	—N/a		Did not advance	
Cahit Kılıçaslan	800 m T46	1:59.14	8	—N/a		Did not advance	
Cahit Kılıçaslan	1500 m T46	4:08.55	11 q	—N/a		4:00.77 PB	8

Women

Athlete	Event	Heat		Semifinal		Final	
Athlete	Event	Result	Rank	Result	Rank	Result	Rank
Sümeyye Özcan; İbrahim Kızılkaya (guide)	1500 m T12	—N/a				5:10.68 PB	7
Ayşegül Tahtakale	Shot put T20	—N/a				8.41	11

== Football 5-a-side ==
Turkey has qualified for the football 5-a-side tournament.

The following is the Turkey squad in the football 5-a-side tournament of the 2012 Summer Paralympics.

No.	Pos.	Player	Age	Club
1	GK	Ali Hidir Kurt	33	BOGES – Ankara
2	DF	Mikail Guclu	23	Istanbul – GES Club
5	DF	Ali Cavdar	32	Istanbul – GES Club
6	MF	Ramazan Kunduz	26	Tokat Erbag GES Club
7	MF	Mucahit Huseyin Uslu	23	Ankara – Çankaya GES Club
8	DF	Vedat Yavuz	38	Ordu – GES Club
9	FW	Kahraman Kurbetoglu	28	Malatya – GES Club
10	FW	Ibrahim Uzum	23	Gaziantep Zeugma GES Club
11	FW	Abdullah Sumer	19	Kayseri -GES Club
12	GK	Ismail Koc	40	Istanbul – GES Club

Group play

Pos	Team	Pld	W	D	L	GF	GA	GD	Pts	Qualification or relegation
1	Brazil (BRA)	3	2	1	0	5	0	+5	7	Qualified for the medal round
2	France (FRA)	3	1	2	0	1	0	+1	5	Qualified for the medal round
3	China (CHN)	3	1	1	1	4	1	+3	4	Qualified for the classification round
4	Turkey (TUR)	3	0	0	3	0	9	−9	0	Qualified for the classification round

31 August 2012
11:00

China	4–0	Turkey
Wenfa Zheng 2', 50'; Xiaoqiang Li 13' (pen.); Yafeng Wang 46'	Report

Riverbank Arena
Attendance: 1,938
Referee: Paul Leversuch (Germany)

2 September 2012
9:00

Turkey	0–4	Brazil
	Report	Conceição 4', 38'; Alves 14'; Da Silva 24' (pen.)

Riverbank Arena
Attendance: 1,438
Referee: Mariano Travaglino (Argentina)

4 September 2012
11:00

France	1–0	Turkey
Labarre 4' (pen.)	Report

Riverbank Arena
Attendance: 1,421
Referee: Mariano Travaglino (Argentina)

5th–8th place semi-final

6 September 2012
11:00

Iran	1–0	Turkey
Rajab Pour 19'	Report

Riverbank Arena
Attendance: 1,510
Referee: Niels Haupt (Germany)

7th–8th place match

8 September 2012
9:00

Turkey	0–2	Great Britain
	Report	Seal 5'; Clarke 48'

Riverbank Arena
Attendance: 969
Referee: Germinal Lubrano (Argentina)

== Goalball ==
Turkey competed for the first time in the men's goalball tournaments.

Squad list	Group stage		Quarter-final	Semi-final	Final	
Squad list	Opposition Result	Rank	Opposition Result	Opposition Result	Opposition Result	Rank
From: Abdullah Aydoğdu; Hüseyin Alkan; Mehmet Cesur; Tekin Okan Düzgün; Tuncay Karakaya; Yusuf Uçar	Sweden; W 9–2	1	Algeria; W 3–1	Finland; L 0–2	Lithuania; W 4–1	3rd place, bronze medalist(s)
From: Abdullah Aydoğdu; Hüseyin Alkan; Mehmet Cesur; Tekin Okan Düzgün; Tuncay Karakaya; Yusuf Uçar	Great Britain; W 7–1	1	Algeria; W 3–1	Finland; L 0–2	Lithuania; W 4–1	3rd place, bronze medalist(s)
From: Abdullah Aydoğdu; Hüseyin Alkan; Mehmet Cesur; Tekin Okan Düzgün; Tuncay Karakaya; Yusuf Uçar	Finland; W 4–0	1	Algeria; W 3–1	Finland; L 0–2	Lithuania; W 4–1	3rd place, bronze medalist(s)
From: Abdullah Aydoğdu; Hüseyin Alkan; Mehmet Cesur; Tekin Okan Düzgün; Tuncay Karakaya; Yusuf Uçar	Brazil; W 4–1	1	Algeria; W 3–1	Finland; L 0–2	Lithuania; W 4–1	3rd place, bronze medalist(s)
From: Abdullah Aydoğdu; Hüseyin Alkan; Mehmet Cesur; Tekin Okan Düzgün; Tuncay Karakaya; Yusuf Uçar	Lithuania; D 2–2	1	Algeria; W 3–1	Finland; L 0–2	Lithuania; W 4–1	3rd place, bronze medalist(s)

Group play

Team	Pld	W	D	L	GF	GA	GD	Pts	Qualification
Turkey	5	4	1	0	26	6	+20	13	Quarterfinals
Brazil	5	3	0	2	30	20	+10	9	Quarterfinals
Lithuania	5	2	2	1	33	20	+13	8	Quarterfinals
Finland	5	2	0	3	16	24	−8	6	Quarterfinals
Sweden	5	1	2	2	16	25	−9	5	Eliminated
Great Britain	5	0	1	4	9	35	−26	1	Eliminated

Source: "London 2012 Paralympic Games - Goalball results" (PDF). Paralympic.org. 2012-10-03 – via Goalball.sport.

30 August 2012; 11:30	Turkey	9 – 2	Sweden	Copper Box, London; Referees: Shinji Mizuno (JPN), Carla Da Matta (BRA)
30 August 2012; 11:30	Alkan 3 Düzgün 3 Uçar 2 Karakaya 1	Report	Seremati 2	Copper Box, London; Referees: Shinji Mizuno (JPN), Carla Da Matta (BRA)

31 August 2012; 11:30	Great Britain	1 – 7	Turkey	Copper Box, London; Referees: Vilma Venckutonyte (LTU), Janne Ahokas (FIN)
31 August 2012; 11:30	Sharkey 1	Report	Karakaya 4 Alkan 2 Düzgün 1	Copper Box, London; Referees: Vilma Venckutonyte (LTU), Janne Ahokas (FIN)

1 September 2012; 09:00	Turkey	4 – 0	Finland	Copper Box, London; Referees: Shinji Mizuno (JPN), Carla Da Matta (BRA)
1 September 2012; 09:00	Karakaya 3 Düzgün 1	Report		Copper Box, London; Referees: Shinji Mizuno (JPN), Carla Da Matta (BRA)

2 September 2012; 21:00	Turkey	4 – 1	Brazil	Copper Box, London; Referees: Dawna Christy (CAN), Vilma Venckutonyte (LTU)
2 September 2012; 21:00	Karakaya 2 Alkan 2	Report	Marques 1	Copper Box, London; Referees: Dawna Christy (CAN), Vilma Venckutonyte (LTU)

4 September 2012; 19:45	Lithuania	2 – 2	Turkey	Copper Box, London; Referees: Hooshang Shariati (IRI), Dawna Christy (CAN)
4 September 2012; 19:45	Zibolis 2	Report	Alkan 1 Karakaya 1	Copper Box, London; Referees: Hooshang Shariati (IRI), Dawna Christy (CAN)

Quarter-final

5 September 2012; 15:45	Turkey	3 – 1	Algeria	Copper Box, London; Referees: Juha Vuokila (FIN), Dawna Christy (CAN)
5 September 2012; 15:45	Karakaya 3	Report	Mokrane 1	Copper Box, London; Referees: Juha Vuokila (FIN), Dawna Christy (CAN)

Semi-final

6 September 2012; 18:30	Turkey	0 – 2	Finland	Copper Box, London; Referees: Tony Connolly (USA), Yasser Omar (EGY)
6 September 2012; 18:30		Report	Mattila 2	Copper Box, London; Referees: Tony Connolly (USA), Yasser Omar (EGY)

Bronze medal match

7 September 2012; 18:30	Lithuania	1 – 4	Turkey	Copper Box, London; Referees: Juha Vuokila (FIN), Yasser Omar (EGY)
7 September 2012; 18:30	Zibolis 1	Report	Karakaya 4	Copper Box, London; Referees: Juha Vuokila (FIN), Yasser Omar (EGY)

== Judo ==
Athlete	Event	First round	Quarter-final	Semi-final	First repechage round	Repechage semi-final	Final	
Athlete	Event	Opposition Result	Opposition Result	Opposition Result	Opposition Result	Opposition Result	Opposition Result	Rank
Halil İbrahim Önel	Men's 73 kg	Junk (GER); W 1010–0100	Kurbanov (RUS); L 0001–1000	Did not advance	Briceno (VEN); L 0002–1120	Did not advance		
Yasin Çimciler	Men's 81 kg	Nattajsolhdar (IRI); L 0001–0200	Did not advance					
Gülhan Kılıç	Women's 52 kg	—N/a	Brussig (GER); L 0014–1002	Did not advance	Ferreira (BRA); L 0002–0220	Did not advance		
Duygu Çete	Women's 57 kg	—N/a	Yoneda (JPN); W 1000–0000	Sultanova (AZE); L 0001–0020	Bye	Simon (USA); W 0140–0002	Did not advance	3rd place, bronze medalist(s)
Şerife Köseoğlu	Women's 63 kg	—N/a	Zhou (CHN); L 0200–0000	Did not advance	Tolppanen (FIN); L 0000–1000	Did not advance		
Nazan Akın	Women's +70 kg	—N/a	Mihaylova (BUL); W 1030–0004	Manzuoli (FRA); W 1000–0000	Bye		Yuan (CHN); L 0000–1000	2nd place, silver medalist(s)

== Powerlifting ==
Men

Athlete	Event	Total lifted	Rank
Turan Mutlu	Men's 56 kg	150.0	10
İzzettin Kanat	Men's 60 kg	180.0	4

Women

Athlete	Event	Total lifted	Rank
Nazmiye Muslu	Women's 40 kg	109.0 WR	1st place, gold medalist(s)
Çiğdem Dede	Women's 44 kg	105.0	2nd place, silver medalist(s)
Yasemin Ceylan	Women's 48 kg	114.0	4
Özlem Becerikli	Women's 56 kg	118.0	3rd place, bronze medalist(s)

== Shooting ==
Athlete	Event	Qualification		Final	
Athlete	Event	Score	Rank	Score	Rank
Muharrem Korhan Yamaç	Men's 10 m air pistol SH1	566	5 Q	664.7; SO: 9.9	2nd place, silver medalist(s)
Muharrem Korhan Yamaç	Mixed 25 m pistol SH1	573	2 Q	763.1	4
Muharrem Korhan Yamaç	Mixed 50 m pistol SH1	532	7 Q	623.8	5
Cevat Karagöl	Men's 10 m air pistol SH1	561	11	Did not advance	
Cevat Karagöl	Mixed 50 m pistol SH1	519	14	Did not advance	
Yunus Bahçeci	Men's 10 m air pistol SH1	527	31	Did not advance	
Yunus Bahçeci	Mixed 25 m pistol SH1	535	21	Did not advance	
Yunus Bahçeci	Mixed 50 m pistol SH1	495	24	Did not advance	
Aysel Özgan	Women's 10 m air pistol SH1	361	10	Did not advance	
Savaş Üstün	Men's 10 m air rifle standing SH1	573	23	Did not advance	
Savaş Üstün	Mixed 10 m air rifle prone SH1	595	29	Did not advance	
Savaş Üstün	Mixed 50 m rifle prone SH1	576	34	Did not advance	

== Swimming ==
Turkey was represented for the first time at the swimming with 2 swimmers.

Men

Athlete	Events	Heats		Final	
Athlete	Events	Time	Rank	Time	Rank
Beytullah Eroğlu	50 m butterfly S5	42.27	7 Q	41.44	7
Beytullah Eroğlu	50 m backstroke S5	43.11	10	Did not advance	
Beytullah Eroğlu	100 m freestyle S5	1:38.45	12	Did not advance	

Women

Athlete	Events	Heats		Final	
Athlete	Events	Time	Rank	Time	Rank
Özlem Baykız	50 m freestyle S6	38.04	8 Q	37.95	8
Özlem Baykız	100 m freestyle S6	1:29.64	12	Did not advance	
Özlem Baykız	400 m freestyle S6	6:46.50	12	Did not advance	
Özlem Baykız	100 m breaststroke S6	1:53.95	6 Q	1:54.60	7
Özlem Baykız	50 m butterfly S6	41.05	8 Q	42.91	8
Özlem Baykız	200 m individual medley S6	3:39.14	13	Did not advance	

== Table tennis ==
Six athletes competed for Turkey in table tennis. Athletes in classes 1 to 5 compete in wheelchairs, while classes 6 to 10 compete standing. Lower numbered classes indicate a higher severity disability. Athletes with intellectual disabilities compete in class 11.

Singles

Athlete	Event	Preliminaries		Quarter-final	Semi-final	Final / BM	
Athlete	Event	Opposition Result	Opposition Result	Opposition Result	Opposition Result	Opposition Result	Rank
Abdullah Öztürk	Men's singles class 4	Mészáros (SVK); W 3–0; Lin (TPE); W 3–1	1	Thomas (FRA); L 1–3	Did not advance		
Hatice Duman	Women's singles class 3	Fillou (FRA); L 1–3; Pintar (SLO); L 1–3	3	Did not advance			
Nergiz Altıntaş	Women's singles class 3	Sigala (MEX); W 3–2; Campbell (GBR); L 1–3	2	Did not advance			
Kübra Öcsoy	Women's singles class 7	Barneoud (FRA); W 3–1 van Zon (NED); L 1–3; Munoz (ARG); W 3–0	2	—N/a	Ovsyannikova (RUS); L 2–3	Safonova (UKR); L 1–3	Did not advance
Neslihan Kavas	Women's singles class 9	Pek (POL); W 3–2; Lei (CHN); L 0–3; Liu (CHN); W 3–0	2	—N/a	Liu (CHN); W 3–0	Lei (CHN); L 2–3	2nd place, silver medalist(s)
Ümran Ertiş	Women's singles class 10	Partyka (POL); L 0–3; Maghraby (EGY); W 3–0; Yang (CHN); L 0–3	3	—N/a	Did not advance		

Teams

Athlete	Event	Round of 16	Quarter-final	Semi-final	Final / BM	
Athlete	Event	Opposition Result	Opposition Result	Opposition Result	Opposition Result	Rank
Hatice Duman; Nergiz Altıntaş	Women's team class 1-3	Thailand (THA); W 3–1	Great Britain (GBR); L 2–3	Did not advance		
Kübra Öcsoy; Neslihan Kavas; Ümran Ertiş	Women's team class 6-10	Bye	Russia (RUS); W 3–2	Poland (POL); W 3–2	China (CHN); L 0–3	2nd place, silver medalist(s)

== Wheelchair basketball ==
Turkey qualified for the men's team event in wheelchair basketball by finishing eighth at the 2010 Wheelchair Basketball World Championship. Competing athletes are given an eight-level-score specific to wheelchair basketball, ranging from 0.5 to 4.5 with lower scores representing a higher degree of disability. The sum score of all players on the court cannot exceed 14.

=== Men's tournament ===
Squad list	Group stage (pool A)		Quarterfinal	Semifinal	Final (bronze final)	
Squad list	Opposition Result	Rank	Opposition Result	Opposition Result	Opposition Result	Rank
From: Ali Asker Turan; Özgür Gürbulak; Cem Gezinci; Kaan Dalay; Murat Arslanoğlu; Aytaç Ercan; Deniz Acar; Fikri Gündoğdu; İsmail Ar; Bestami Boz; Bülent Yılmaz; Ferit Gümüş	United States; W 59–50	2	Great Britain; L 75–70	Did not advance		7
From: Ali Asker Turan; Özgür Gürbulak; Cem Gezinci; Kaan Dalay; Murat Arslanoğlu; Aytaç Ercan; Deniz Acar; Fikri Gündoğdu; İsmail Ar; Bestami Boz; Bülent Yılmaz; Ferit Gümüş	Australia; L 64–71	2	Great Britain; L 75–70	Did not advance		7
From: Ali Asker Turan; Özgür Gürbulak; Cem Gezinci; Kaan Dalay; Murat Arslanoğlu; Aytaç Ercan; Deniz Acar; Fikri Gündoğdu; İsmail Ar; Bestami Boz; Bülent Yılmaz; Ferit Gümüş	Italy; W 65–60	2	Great Britain; L 75–70	Did not advance		7
From: Ali Asker Turan; Özgür Gürbulak; Cem Gezinci; Kaan Dalay; Murat Arslanoğlu; Aytaç Ercan; Deniz Acar; Fikri Gündoğdu; İsmail Ar; Bestami Boz; Bülent Yılmaz; Ferit Gümüş	Spain; L 64–67	2	Great Britain; L 75–70	Did not advance		7
From: Ali Asker Turan; Özgür Gürbulak; Cem Gezinci; Kaan Dalay; Murat Arslanoğlu; Aytaç Ercan; Deniz Acar; Fikri Gündoğdu; İsmail Ar; Bestami Boz; Bülent Yılmaz; Ferit Gümüş	South Africa; W 79–54	2	Great Britain; L 75–70	Did not advance		7

Group A

Team	Pld	W	L	PF	PA	PD	Pts	Qualification
Australia	5	5	0	372	259	+113	10	Quarter-finals
Turkey	5	3	2	331	302	+29	8 (Note: Head-to-head score differential: TUR: +6; USA: −1; ESP: −5)	Quarter-finals
United States	5	3	2	330	259	+71	8	Quarter-finals
Spain	5	3	2	322	292	+30	8	Quarter-finals
Italy	5	1	4	260	309	−49	6	Eliminated
South Africa	5	0	5	204	398	−194	5	Eliminated

Rules for classification: 1) Table points, 2) Head-to-head score differential
Notes:

30 August 2012
10:45

Report

United States	50–59	Turkey
Scoring by quarter: 13–18, 12–13, 20–11, 5–17
Pts: Chambers 17; Rebs: Chambers 9 Asts: Lade 4		Pts: Gezinci 15; Rebs: Gezinci 17; Asts: Gürbulak 15

Basketball Arena, London
Referees: Chris Gregory (GBR)

31 August 2012
18:30

Report

Turkey	64–71	Australia
Scoring by quarter: 15–17, 20–22, 16–16, 13–16
Pts: Gürbulak 20; Rebs: Gezinci 12; Asts: Dalay 7		Pts: Eveson, Knowles 17; Rebs: Ness 11; Asts: Norris 8

Basketball Arena, London
Referees: Sébastien Gauthier (CAN)

1 September 2012
10:45

Report

Turkey	65–60	Italy
Scoring by quarter: 21–7, 14–21, 11–10, 19–22
Pts: Gürbulak 17; Rebs: Gürbulak 14; Asts: Gürbulak 11		Pts: Cavagnini 25; Rebs: Cavagnini 15; Asts: Moukhariq 5

Basketball Arena, London
Referees: Gustavo Mathias (BRA)

2 September 2012
20:45

Report

Spain	67–64	Turkey
Scoring by quarter: 13–14, 14–16, 21–13, 19–21
Pts: De Paz Pazo 19; Rebs: De Paz Pazo, Zarzuela Beltrán 7 Asts: de Paz Pazo 8		Pts: Gürbulak 18; Rebs: Gürbulak 9 Asts: Gürbulak 4

Basketball Arena, London
Referees: Krunoslav Peić (CRO)

3 September 2012
19:00

Report

Turkey	79–54	South Africa
Scoring by quarter: 18–10, 16–18, 20–12, 25–14
Pts: Gezinci 21; Rebs: Gezinci 9 Asts: Gümüş 5		Pts: Nortje 24; Rebs: Nortje 9 Asts: Papenfus 9

North Greenwich Arena, London
Referees: Mati Quintana (ARG)

Quarter-final

5 September 2012
15:15

Report

Turkey	70–75	Great Britain
Scoring by quarter: 14–16, 16–16, 15–22, 25–21
Pts: Gürbulak 28; Rebs: Ercan 10; Asts: Gürbulak 9		Pts: Bywater 23; Rebs: Pollock 9 Asts: Bywater 13

North Greenwich Arena, London
Referees: Juan Uruñuela (ESP)

5th–8th place semi-final

7 September 2012
15:15

Report

Turkey	78–86 (OT)	Spain
Scoring by quarter: 21–18, 16–22, 12–12, 19–16, Overtime: 10–18
Pts: Gürbulak, Gümüş 24; Rebs: Gümüş 9 Asts: Gürbulak 9		Pts: De Paz Pazo 24; Rebs: De Paz Pazo 12; Asts: García Pereiro 10

North Greenwich Arena, London
Referees: Christopher Gregory (GBR)

7th/8th place match

8 September 2012
13:00

Report

Poland	74–76	Turkey
Scoring by quarter: 14–12, 21–22, 20–21, 19–21
Pts: Filipski 28; Rebs: Mosler 11; Asts: Filipski 15		Pts: Gümüş 30; Rebs: Gümüş 9 Asts: Gürbulak 13

North Greenwich Arena, London
Referees: Carsten Rehling (GER)

== See also ==
- Turkey at the Paralympics
- Turkey at the 2012 Summer Olympics
