= Ukraine men's national goalball team =

Ukrainian national team, for the Paralympic sport of goalball

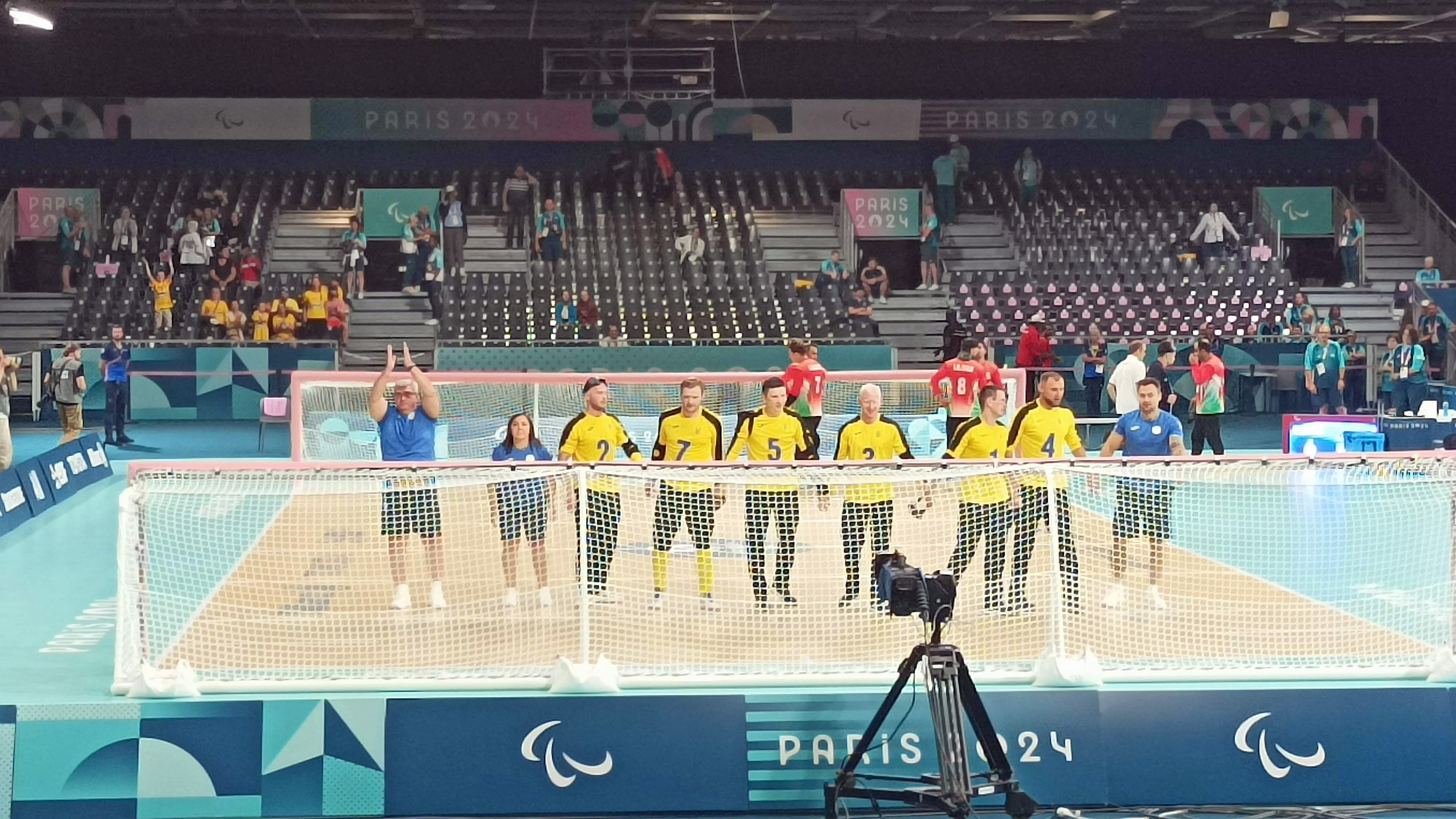
- Ukraine team at the 2024 Paralympic Games
- Sport: Goalball
- League: IBSA
- Division: Men
- Region: IBSA Europe
- Location: Ukraine
- Colours: Black, yellow
- Championships: Paralympic Games medals: : 0: 1: 0 World Championship medals: : 0: 0: 1

Ukraine men's national goalball team is the men's national team of Ukraine. Goalball is a team sport designed specifically for athletes with a vision impairment. The team takes part in international competitions.

== Paralympic Games ==
=== 2020 Tokyo ===
The team competed in the 2020 Summer Paralympics, with competition from Wednesday 25 August to finals on Friday 3 September 2021, in the Makuhari Messe arena, Chiba, Tokyo, Japan.

The following is the Ukraine roster in the men's goalball tournament of the 2020 Summer Paralympics.

| No. | Player | Class | Date of birth (age) |
|---|---|---|---|
| 1 | Vasyl Oliinyk | B2 | 10 January 1996 (aged 25) |
| 2 | Anton Strelchyk | B3 | 4 March 1992 (aged 29) |
| 3 | Vitalii Haponenko | B2 | 17 December 1994 (aged 26) |
| 4 | Yevheniy Tsyhanenko | B3 | 10 December 1990 (aged 30) |
| 5 | Rodion Zhyhalin | B2 | 21 May 1985 (aged 36) |
| 7 | Oleksandr Toporkov | B2 | 31 May 1991 (aged 30) |

| Pos | Team | Pld | W | D | L | GF | GA | GD | Pts | Qualification |
|---|---|---|---|---|---|---|---|---|---|---|
| 1 | Belgium | 4 | 2 | 0 | 2 | 18 | 13 | +5 | 6 | Quarter-finals |
| 2 | Ukraine | 4 | 2 | 0 | 2 | 18 | 15 | +3 | 6 | Quarter-finals |
| 3 | Turkey | 4 | 2 | 0 | 2 | 15 | 15 | 0 | 6 | Quarter-finals |
| 4 | China | 4 | 2 | 0 | 2 | 21 | 22 | −1 | 6 | Quarter-finals |
| 5 | Germany | 4 | 2 | 0 | 2 | 16 | 23 | −7 | 6 | |

Source: TOCOG

Round-robin

| 26 August 2021; 17:30 | Ukraine | 11–5 | Germany | Makuhari Messe, Tokyo; Referees: Yoshinori Nii (Japan), Vaida Pokvytytė (Lithuania) |
| 26 August 2021; 17:30 | Zhyhalin 7 Oliinyk 4 | Report | Dennis 3 Rogge 2 | Makuhari Messe, Tokyo; Referees: Yoshinori Nii (Japan), Vaida Pokvytytė (Lithuania) |

| 27 August 2021; 17:30 | China | 7–3 | Ukraine | Makuhari Messe, Tokyo; Referees: Romualdas Vaitiekus (Lithuania), Warrick Jackes (Australia) |
| 27 August 2021; 17:30 | Chen Liangliang 3 Cai Changgui 2 Yang Mingyuan 2 | Report | Zhyhalin 2 Oliinyk 1 | Makuhari Messe, Tokyo; Referees: Romualdas Vaitiekus (Lithuania), Warrick Jackes (Australia) |

| 28 August 2021; 10:30 | Turkey | 6–3 | China | Makuhari Messe, Tokyo; Referees: Svitlana Moroz (Ukraine), Yoshinori Nii (Japan) |
| 28 August 2021; 10:30 | Kara 3 Karakaya 3 | Report | Yang Mingyuan 2 Cai Changgui 1 | Makuhari Messe, Tokyo; Referees: Svitlana Moroz (Ukraine), Yoshinori Nii (Japan) |

| 30 August 2021; 09:00 | Ukraine | 0–1 | Turkey | Makuhari Messe, Tokyo; Referees: Warrick Jackes (Australia), Yoshinori Nii (Japan) |
| 30 August 2021; 09:00 | | Report | Karakaya 1 | Makuhari Messe, Tokyo; Referees: Warrick Jackes (Australia), Yoshinori Nii (Japan) |

== World Championships ==
IBSA World Goalball Championships have been held every four years from 1978. Placing first or second in the tournament may earn a berth in the Paralympic Games goalball tournaments.

=== 2022 Matosinhos ===
The team competed in the 2022 World Championships from 7 to 16 December 2022, at the Centro de Desportos e Congressos de Matosinhos, Portugal. There were sixteen men's and sixteen women's teams. They placed third in Pool D, winning four of seven games, and third in final standings behind Brazil and China.

== Regional championships ==
The team competes in the IBSA Europe goalball region. Groups A and C are held one year, and Group B the following year. Strong teams move towards Group A.

They commenced their regional goalball journey with the new A Division for the 2005 Neerpelt championships. The team came second at the 2019 Rostock and 2021 Samsun championships, before regional champions at the 2023 Podgorica championships.

== See also ==
- Disabled sports
- Ukraine women's national goalball team
- Ukraine at the Paralympics
