= Turkey men's national goalball team =

Turkish national team, for the Paralympic sport of goalball

Turkish men's national goalball team
- Sport: Goalball
- League: IBSA
- Division: Men
- Region: IBSA Europe
- Location: Turkey
- Colours: Red
- Championships: Paralympic Games medals: :0:0:1; World Championship medals: :0:0:0
- Parent group: Turkish Blind Sport Federation (Turkish: Türkiye Görme Engelliler Spor Federasyonu, TGESF)

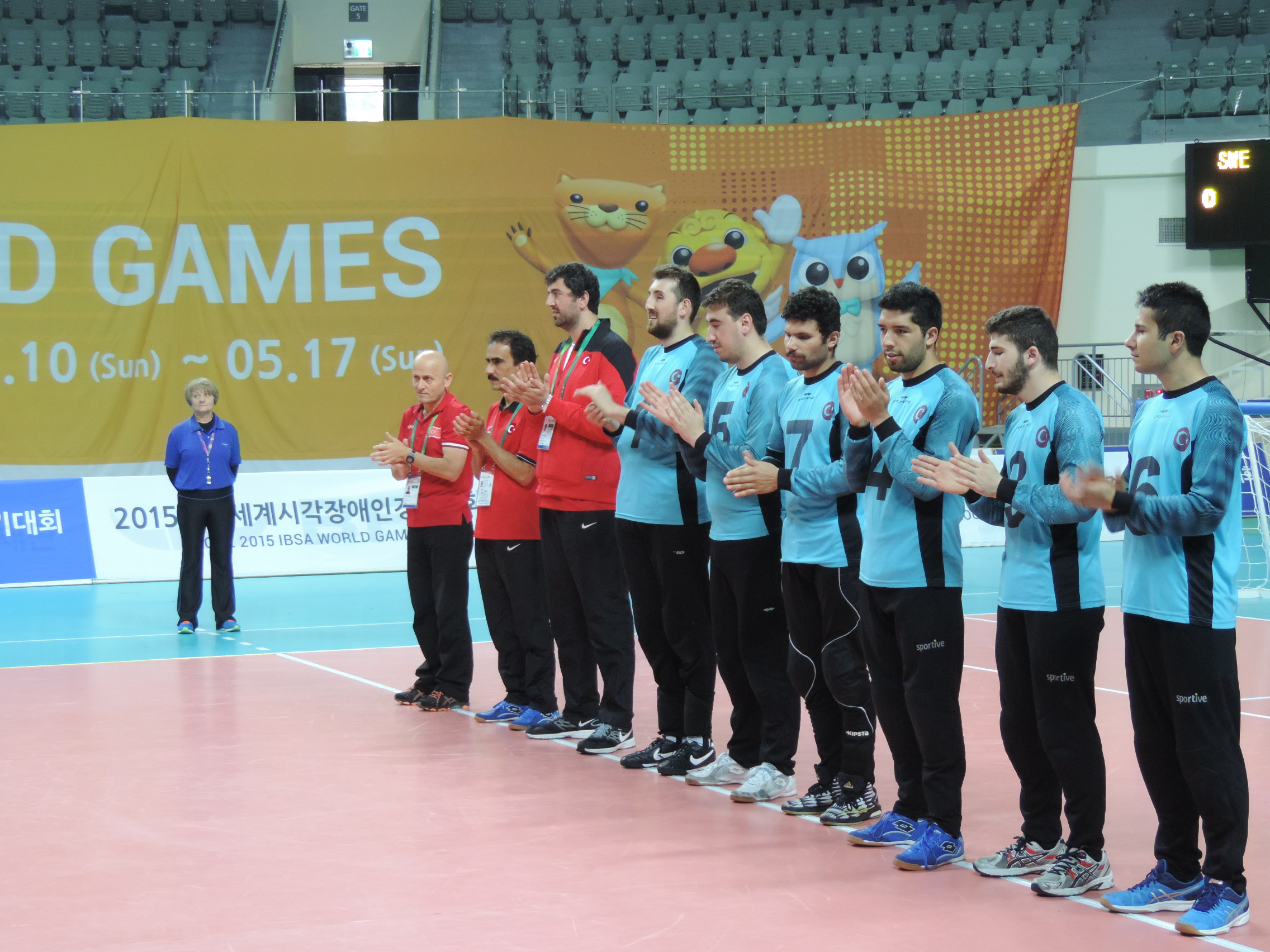
Turkey men's national goalball team at the 2015 IBSA World Games in Seoul, South Korea.

Turkey men's national goalball team is the men's national team of Turkey. Goalball is a team sport designed specifically for athletes with a vision impairment. The team takes part in international goalball competitions.

== Paralympic Games ==
=== 2012 London ===
The team competed in the 2012 Summer Paralympics from 30 August to 7 September 2012, in the Copper Box Arena, London, England. There were twelve men's and ten women's teams (an increase of two more women's teams from past years).

The national team qualified for the first time at the Paralympics in the 2012 Summer Paralympics and won the bronze medal defeating the team of Lithuania in the third place match.

The following is the Turkey roster in the men's goalball tournament of the 2012 Summer Paralympics.

No.	Player	Age
1	Tekin Okan Düzgün	24
2	Hüseyin Alkan	24
3	Mehmet Cesur	30
5	Yusuf Uçar	25
6	Abdullah Aydoğdu	21
7	Tuncay Karakaya	23

Team	Pld	W	D	L	GF	GA	GD	Pts	Qualification
Turkey	5	4	1	0	26	6	+20	13	Quarterfinals
Brazil	5	3	0	2	30	20	+10	9	Quarterfinals
Lithuania	5	2	2	1	33	20	+13	8	Quarterfinals
Finland	5	2	0	3	16	24	−8	6	Quarterfinals
Sweden	5	1	2	2	16	25	−9	5	Eliminated
Great Britain	5	0	1	4	9	35	−26	1	Eliminated

Source: "London 2012 Paralympic Games - Goalball results" (PDF). Paralympic.org. 3 October 2012 – via Goalball.sport.

The bronze medal-winning squad at the 2012 Summer Paralympics, consisted of following players:

Name	City
Tekin Okan Düzgün	Ankara
Tuncay Karakaya	Ankara
Hüseyin Alkan	Ankara
Abdullah Aydoğdu	Ankara
Yusuf Uçar	Istanbul
Mehmet Cesur	Ankara

=== 2020 Tokyo ===
The team competed in the 2020 Summer Paralympics, with competition from Wednesday 25 August to finals on Friday 3 September 2021, in the Makuhari Messe arena, Chiba, Tokyo, Japan.

The following is the Turkey roster in the men's goalball tournament of the 2020 Summer Paralympics.

No.	Player	Class	Date of birth (age)
1	Hüseyin Alkan	B1	1 April 1988 (aged 33)
3	Ebubekir Sıddık Kara	B2	13 July 1995 (aged 26)
4	Ekrem Gündoğdu	B1	26 October 1990 (aged 30)
6	Tekin Okan Düzgün	B1	24 May 1988 (aged 33)
7	Tuncay Karakaya	B1	1 October 1989 (aged 31)
8	Abdullah Aydoğdu	B3	27 September 1991 (aged 29)

Pos	Team	Pld	W	D	L	GF	GA	GD	Pts	Qualification
1	Belgium	4	2	0	2	18	13	+5	6	Quarter-finals
2	Ukraine	4	2	0	2	18	15	+3	6	Quarter-finals
3	Turkey	4	2	0	2	15	15	0	6	Quarter-finals
4	China	4	2	0	2	21	22	−1	6	Quarter-finals
5	Germany	4	2	0	2	16	23	−7	6	

Source: TOCOG

Round-robin

25 August 2021; 17:30	Germany	6–4	Turkey	Makuhari Messe, Tokyo; Referees: Romualdas Vaitiekus (Lithuania), Reza Dehghan (Iran)
25 August 2021; 17:30	Dennis 4 Hörauf 1 Steiger 1	Report	Karakaya 3 Gündoğdu 1	Makuhari Messe, Tokyo; Referees: Romualdas Vaitiekus (Lithuania), Reza Dehghan (Iran)

27 August 2021; 09:00	Turkey	4–6	Belgium	Makuhari Messe, Tokyo; Referees: Yoshinori Nii (Japan), Robert Avery (Great Britain)
27 August 2021; 09:00	Karakaya 3 Gündoğdu 1	Report	B. Vanhove 3 Mapreni 2 T. Vanhove 1	Makuhari Messe, Tokyo; Referees: Yoshinori Nii (Japan), Robert Avery (Great Britain)

28 August 2021; 10:30	Turkey	6–3	China	Makuhari Messe, Tokyo; Referees: Svitlana Moroz (Ukraine), Yoshinori Nii (Japan)
28 August 2021; 10:30	Kara 3 Karakaya 3	Report	Yang Mingyuan 2 Cai Changgui 1	Makuhari Messe, Tokyo; Referees: Svitlana Moroz (Ukraine), Yoshinori Nii (Japan)

30 August 2021; 09:00	Ukraine	0–1	Turkey	Makuhari Messe, Tokyo; Referees: Warrick Jackes (Australia), Yoshinori Nii (Japan)
30 August 2021; 09:00		Report	Karakaya 1	Makuhari Messe, Tokyo; Referees: Warrick Jackes (Australia), Yoshinori Nii (Japan)

== World Championships ==
IBSA World Goalball Championships have been held every four years from 1978. Placing first or second in the tournament may earn a berth in the Paralympic Games goalball tournaments.

=== 2022 Matosinhos ===
The team competed in the 2022 World Championships from 7 to 16 December 2022, at the Centro de Desportos e Congressos de Matosinhos, Portugal. There were sixteen men's and sixteen women's teams. They placed second in Pool C, and fifth in final standings.

== Regional championships ==
The team competes in the IBSA Europe goalball region. Groups A and C are held one year, and Group B the following year. Strong teams move towards Group A.

=== 2007 Antalya ===
Turkey men's goalball national team, initially competing in the Group C, won the 2007 IBSA European Goalball Championships held in Antalya, Turkey, and was promoted to the Group B.

=== 2011 Assens (Group A) ===
In 2011, the national team became runner-up at the IBSA European Championships in Assens, Denmark, and was promoted to the Group A.

== Results ==
Event	Date	Host	Ranking
IBSA World Summer Games (Goalball)	1–12 Aug 2003	Canada, Quebec	28th
Islamic Solidarity Games (Goalball)	8–20 Apr 2005	Saudi Arabia, Jeddah	5th
Goalball World Youth Championships	4–10 Aug 2005	United States, Colorado Springs	(bronze)
IBSA International Goalball Tournament	6–9 Apr 2006	United Kingdom, Bolton	5th
IBSA International Goalball Tournament	21–24 Jul 2006	Bulgaria, Sofia	2nd place, silver medalist(s)
IBSA European Goalball Championship Group C	24–29 Apr 2007	Turkey, Alanya	(gold)
IBSA Wotld Championships and Games	24 Jul – 8 Aug 2007	Brazil, São Paulo	16th
International Goalball Tournament	19–22 Apr 2008	United Kingdom, Manchester	4th
IBSA European Goalball Championship	26–30 Jun 2008	Finland, Nastola	5th
International Goalball Tournament	29–31 Oct 2009	United Kingdom, Manchester	(bronze)
IBSA European Goalball Championship	19–24 Oct 2010	Denmark, Assens	(bronze)
International Goalball Tournament	17–20 Feb 2011	United Kingdom, Sheffield	(gold)
4th IBSA World Championships and Games	1–10 Apr 2011	Turkey, Antalya	(silver)
International Goalball Tournament	1–5 Sep 2011	Belgium, Ghent	3rd place, bronze medalist(s)
IBSA European Goalball Championship Group B	19–24 Oct 2011	Denmark, Assens	(bronze)
Int'l Goalball Development Tournament for Men	23–26 Feb 2012	Turkey, Antalya	(silver)
Goalball at the Summer Paralympics	29 Aug – 9 Sep 2012	United Kingdom, London	(bronze)
IBSA European Goalball Championships	1–11 Nov 2013	Turkey, Konya	(bronze)
4th International Goalball Tournament	5–8 Jun 2014	Poland, Supraśl	(silver)
Malmö Lady- and Men Intercup 2015	2–5 Apr 2015	Sweden, Malmö	(gold)
IBSA World Games Goalball Tournament	10–17 May 2015	South Korea, Seoul	4th
IBSA European Goalball Championship	8–12 Jul 2015	Lithuania, Kaunas	(gold)
IBSA European Goalball Championship	22–29 Aug 2015	United Kingdom, Hereford	(gold)
Pajulahti Games 2016	22–24 Jan 2016	Finland, Nastola	(bronze)
2016 Rio Open Goalball Men's Tournament	6–8 May 2016	Brazil, Rio de Janeiro	(bronze)
6th International Goalball Tournament	14–15 May 2016	Poland, Suprasl	4th

== See also ==
- Disabled sports
- Turkey women's national goalball team
- Turkey at the Paralympics
