= Judo at the 2012 Summer Paralympics – Women's +70 kg =

Judo – Women's +70 kg at the XIV Paralympic Games
- Venue: ExCeL London
- Date: 1 September 2012
- Competitors: 8 from 8 nations

Medalists
1st place, gold medalist(s)		Yanping Yuan	China
2nd place, silver medalist(s)		Nazan Akın	Turkey
3rd place, bronze medalist(s)		Zoubida Bouazoug	Algeria
3rd place, bronze medalist(s)		Irina Kalyanova	Russia

The women's +70 kg judo competition at the 2012 Summer Paralympics was held on 1 September at ExCeL London.

== Results ==
Quarterfinals
Yanping Yuan (CHN)	020
Zoubida Bouazoug (ALG)	000
Katie Davis (USA)	001
Deanne Silva de Almeida (BRA)	0122
Nazan Akin (TUR)	103
Ivomira Mihaylova (BUL)	0004
Celine Manzuoli (FRA)	101
Irina Kalyanova (RUS)	000

Semifinals
Yanping Yuan (CHN)	101
Deanne Silva de Almeida (BRA)	000
Nazan Akin (TUR)	100
Celine Manzuoli (FRA)	000

Final
Yanping Yuan (CHN)	100
Nazan Akin (TUR)	000

=== Repechage ===
Repechage
Zoubida Bouazoug (ALG)	020
Katie Davis (USA)	000
Ivomira Mihaylova (BUL)	0001
Irina Kalyanova (RUS)	100

Bronze medal finals
Zoubida Bouazoug (ALG)	023
Celine Manzuoli (FRA)	0002
Irina Kalyanova (RUS)	0212
Deanne Silva de Almeida (BRA)	0113
