= Shooting at the 2012 Summer Paralympics – Men's 10 metre air pistol SH1 =

Men's 10 metre air pistol standing SH1 at the XIV Paralympic Games
- Venue: Royal Artillery Barracks
- Dates: 30 August 2012
- Competitors: 31 from 22 nations

Medalists
1st place, gold medalist(s)		Park Sea-Kyun; South Korea
2nd place, silver medalist(s)		Muharrem Korhan Yamaç; Turkey
3rd place, bronze medalist(s)		Lee Ju-Hee; South Korea

The Men's 10 metre air pistol SH1 event at the 2012 Summer Paralympics took place on 30 August at the Royal Artillery Barracks in Woolwich.

The event consisted of two rounds: a qualifier and a final. In the qualifier, each shooter fired 60 shots with an air pistol at 10 metres distance from the "standing" (interpreted to include seated in wheelchairs) position. Scores for each shot were in increments of 1, with a maximum score of 10.

The top 8 shooters in the qualifying round moved on to the final round. There, they fired an additional 10 shots. These shots scored in increments of .1, with a maximum score of 10.9. The total score from all 70 shots were used to determine final ranking.

== Qualification round ==
Rank	Athlete	Country	1	2	3	4	5	6	Total	Notes
1	Wojciech Kosowski	Poland	96	92	94	96	96	94	568	Q
2	Lee Ju-Hee	South Korea	95	93	88	98	97	97	568	Q
3	Park Sea-Kyun	South Korea	95	97	94	93	94	94	567	Q
4	Bordin Sornsriwichai	Thailand	95	91	96	93	94	97	566	Q
5	Muharrem Korhan Yamaç	Turkey	95	94	91	97	94	95	566	Q
6	Sergey Malyshev	Russia	91	95	93	95	95	96	565	Q
7	Živko Papaz	Serbia	91	96	92	93	96	95	563	Q
8	Valeriy Ponomarenko	Russia	91	91	95	95	97	94	563	Q
9	Ru Decheng	China	93	93	91	97	93	95	562	
10	Ni Hedong	China	95	95	95	91	90	96	562	
11	Cevat Karagöl	Turkey	93	96	94	93	94	91	561	
12	Hubert Aufschnaiter	Austria	91	94	93	94	95	92	559	
13	Andrey Lebedinskiy	Russia	91	94	92	95	95	92	559	
14	Eric Hollen	United States	94	89	92	94	92	97	558	
15	Gyula Gurisatti	Hungary	98	87	94	92	92	95	558	
16	Vadym Nesterenko	Ukraine	95	95	91	90	94	93	558	
17	Marino Heredia	Cuba	95	93	92	92	91	93	556	
18	Paul Schnider	Switzerland	96	92	91	93	91	92	555	
19	Seo Young-Kyun	South Korea	94	92	90	98	94	86	554	
20	Soriano San Martín	Spain	96	92	90	92	90	94	554	
21	Akbar Muradov	Azerbaijan	90	93	93	95	93	90	554	
22	Vanco Karanfilov	Macedonia	89	92	94	93	93	92	553	
23	Marco Pusinich	Italy	93	93	90	91	96	89	552	
24	Li Jianfei	China	88	93	95	90	93	92	551	
25	Evripides Georgiou	Cyprus	89	92	92	88	90	94	545	
26	Osvaldo Gentili	Argentina	89	89	92	89	95	91	545	
27	Giancarlo Iori	Italy	87	90	97	89	94	86	543	
28	Frank Heitmeyer	Germany	79	92	91	91	96	92	541	
29	Bjørn Morten Hagen	Norway	90	91	88	90	90	90	539	
30	Adrian Bunclark	Great Britain	87	91	88	90	90	91	537	
31	Yunus Bahçeci	Turkey	88	86	88	86	88	91	527	

Q – Qualified for final

== Final ==
Rank	Athlete	Country	Qual	1	2	3	4	5	6	7	8	9	10	Final	Total
1	Park Sea-Kyun	South Korea	567	10.0	10.3	9.3	10.2	10.2	9.6	9.3	9.2	9.8	9.8	97.7	664.7
2	Muharrem Korhan Yamaç	Turkey	568	10.3	8.6	10.1	9.5	10.1	10.0	10.2	9.5	10.1	10.3	98.7	664.7
3	Lee Ju-Hee	South Korea	567	9.1	10.3	9.0	9.4	8.7	8.8	10.6	9.6	10.3	8.9	94.7	662.7
4	Bordin Sornsriwichai	Thailand	566	9.2	9.7	10.0	10.0	8.3	10.5	9.0	10.0	10.2	9.2	96.1	662.1
5	Valeriy Ponomarenko	Russia	563	9.6	9.4	9.7	8.2	10.5	10.4	10.1	10.5	10.2	9.7	98.3	661.3
6	Živko Papaz	Serbia	563	8.7	10.1	10.2	10.2	10.0	8.7	10.3	10.8	9.6	9.1	97.7	660.7
7	Wojciech Kosowski	Poland	568	9.4	8.0	9.7	7.0	9.7	9.1	9.5	10.0	10.2	10.1	92.7	660.7
8	Sergey Malyshev	Russia	565	7.9	10.2	10.8	7.9	8.0	10.7	10.6	7.6	8.4	9.7	91.8	656.8
