= Eric Hollen =

American Paralympic pistol shooter

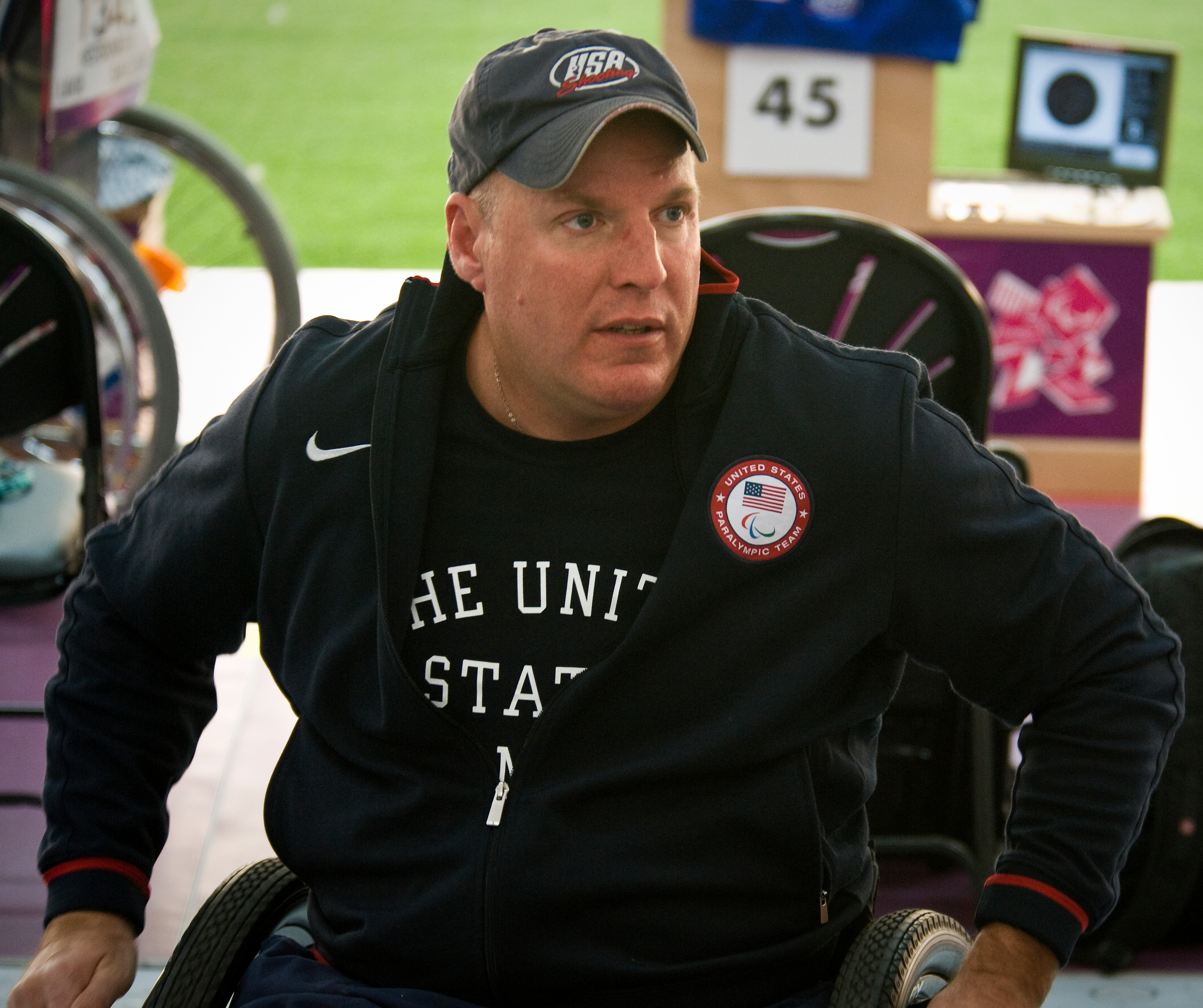
- Hollen at the 2012 Paralympics

Personal information
- Born: October 2, 1965 (age 59); Colorado Springs, U.S.
- Education: University of Southern California
- Height: 6 ft 4 in (193 cm)
- Weight: 230 lb (104 kg)

Sport
- Sport: Shooting
- Event(s): Paralympic pistol P1 and P4
- Club: U.S. Army

Eric Hollen (born October 2, 1965) is an American Paralympic pistol shooter who won five world cup medals between 2009 and 2011. In 2010 and 2011 he was voted USA Shooting Paralympic Athlete of the Year. In 2012 he became the first American pistol shooter to qualify for Paralympics; at the 2012 London Games he placed 14th in the 10 m and 23rd in the 50 m events.

Hollen is a former U.S. Army Ranger, who lost control in his legs after an accident on his horse farm in Tennessee. He has a daughter, Payten. He studied for a master's degree in social counseling at the University of Southern California aiming to work with injured war veterans.

He is a member of the Paralyzed Veterans of America who awarded him trophies from 2010 to 2012.

In 2014 Alaskan senator Charlie Huggins invited him to become Veterans Affairs Specialist.
