= Rodion Zhyhalin =

Ukrainian goalball player (born 1985)

Personal information
- Nationality: Ukrainian
- Born: 21 May 1985 (age 41)

Sport
- Sport: Goalball
Medal record
Representing Ukraine
Summer Paralympics
Silver medal – second place	2024 Paris	Men's
World Championshipss
Bronze medal – third place	2022 Matosinhos	Team
European Championships
Gold medal – first place	2023 Podgorica	Men's
Silver medal – second place	2021 Samsun	Men's
Silver medal – second place	2019 Rostock	Men's

Rodion Volodymyrovych Zhyhalin (Ukrainian: Родіон Володимирович Жигалін; born 21 May 1985) is a Ukrainian goalball player and a member of the Ukrainian men's national team.

With the Ukrainian team, Zhyhalin won the European Championship Group B in 2016, 2018 and won a silver in 2019 European Championship. He was also a part of the Ukraine roster in the men's goalball tournament of the 2020 Summer Paralympics. He took part in the 2022 Goalball World Championships, where his team won the bronze medal. He then competed in the 2023 European Championships, where his team won the men's tournament. Zhyhalin was on the team that won silver in the men's tournament, at the 2024 Summer Paralympics.
