= Ivomira Mihaylova =

Bulgarian judoka

Personal information
- National team: Bulgaria
- Born: March 12, 1990 (age 36)
- Occupation: Judoka

Sport
- Country: Bulgaria
- Sport: Judo
- Disability: Visual impairment
- Weight class: +70 kg
Medal record
Women's judo
Representing Bulgaria
IBSA European Judo Championships
Gold medal – first place	2011 Crawley	+78 kg
Silver medal – second place	2011 Crawley	+70 kg
Bronze medal – third place	2009 Debrecen	+78 kg

Profile at external databases
- JudoInside.com: 99814
- Updated on 14 November 2017

Ivomira Mihaylova (Bulgarian: Ивомира Михайлова) (born 12 March 1990) is a Bulgarian judoka who competes in the +70 kg and +78 kg weight classes internationally, winning multiple medals at the IBSA European Judo Championships.

== Career ==
Ivomira Mihaylova was born on 12 March 1990. At the 2009 International Blind Sports Federation European Judo Championships, she won the bronze medal in the +78 kg weight class. Mihaylova finished fifth in the women's +70 kg class at the IBSF Judo World Championships in 2010, held in Colorado Springs, Colorado.

She took part in the 2011 IBSA European Judo Championships, in Crawley, England. Mihaylova competed in two different weight classes, both the +70 kg and the +78 kg, winning the silver medal in the former and the gold medal in the latter. She was nominated for Bulgarian Disabled Athlete of the Year later in 2011, alongside Alexander Kenanov, Dechko Ovcharov, Ruzhdi Ruzhdi and Stela Eneva.

Mihaylova was selected for the Bulgarian team at the 2012 Summer Paralympics in London, England, in the women's +70 kg tournament. She reached the quarter-finals, where she lost to eventual silver medallist Turkey's Nazan Akin through an ippon.

In 2015, Mihaylova was ranked ninth in the world in her weight class.
