= Irina Kalyanova =

Russian Paralympic judoka

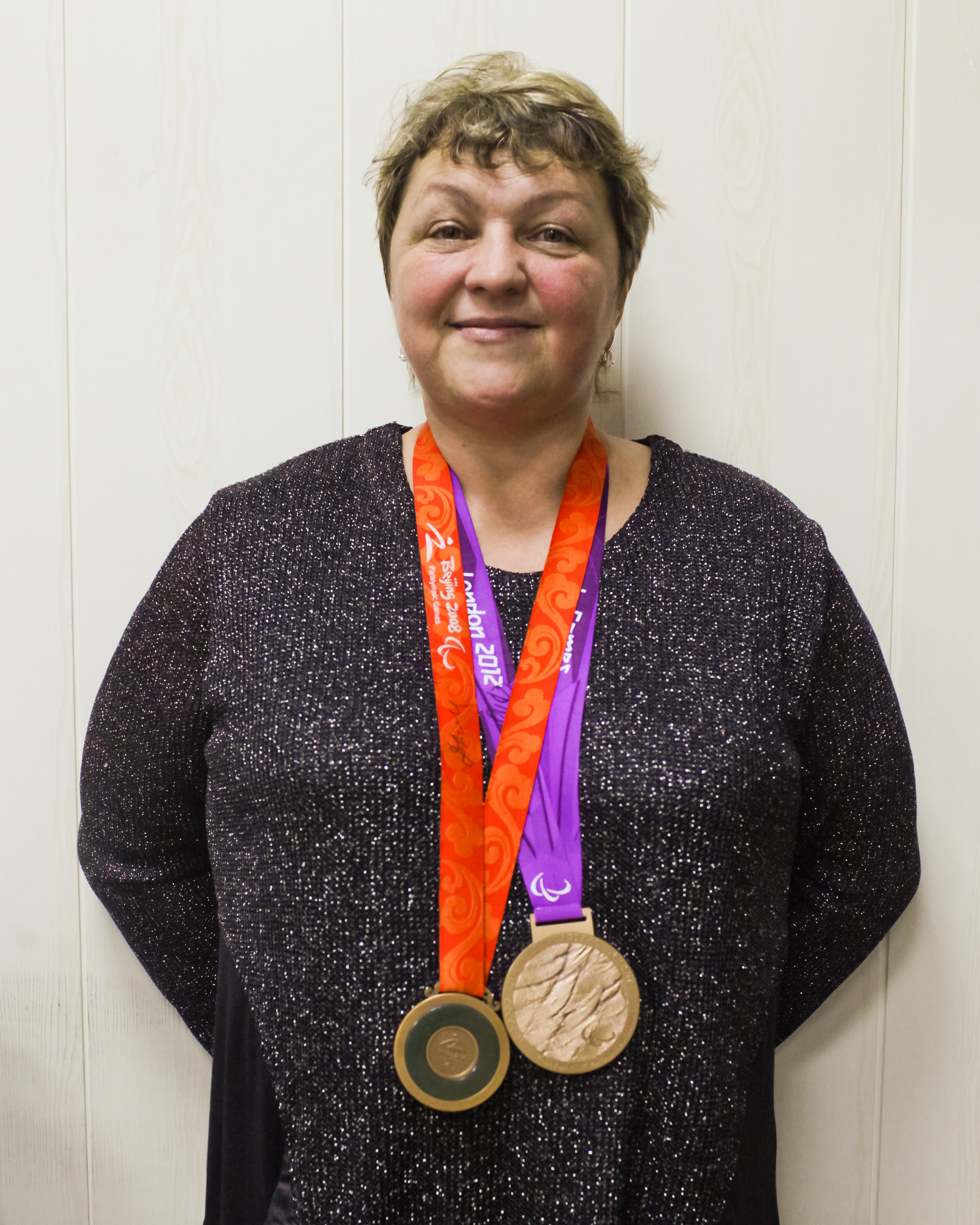
- Irina Kalyanova (2014)

Personal information
- Born: 31 August 1966 (age 59)
- Occupation: Judoka

Sport
- Country: Russia
- Sport: Paralympic judo
- Weight class: +70 kg
Medal record
Women's judo
Representing Russia
Paralympic Games
Bronze medal – third place	2008 Beijing	+70 kg
Bronze medal – third place	2012 London	+70 kg

Irina Kalyanova is a Russian Paralympic judoka. She represented Russia at the 2008 Summer Paralympics held in Beijing, China and at the 2012 Summer Paralympics held in London, United Kingdom and she won two medals: a bronze medal both in the women's +70 kg event in 2008 and in the women's +70 kg event in 2012.

At the 2015 IBSA European Judo Championships held in Odivelas, Portugal, she won the bronze medal in the women's +70 kg event.
