= Park Sea-kyun =

South Korean Paralympic sport shooter

- Hangul: 박세균
- RR: Bak Segyun
- MR: Pak Segyun

Park Sea-kyun
Medal record

Men's shooting

Representing South Korea

Paralympic Games
Gold medal – first place	2012 London	Men's 10 metre air pistol SH1
Gold medal – first place	2012 London	Mixed 50 metre pistol SH1
Gold medal – first place	2008 Beijing	Mixed 50 metre pistol SH1

Park Sea-kyun (born 1 June 1971) is a South Korean Paralympian shooter. He won two gold medals at the 2012 Summer Paralympics, in the Men's 10 metre air pistol SH1 and the Mixed 50 metre pistol SH1. He is the current Paralympic champion.
