= Mehmet Cesur =

Turkish goalball player (born 1982)

Personal information
- Nationality: Turkish
- Born: 24 March 1982 (age 44) Ankara, Turkey

Sport
- Sport: Goalball
- Event: class B2
- Club: Çankaya Belediyesi Görme Engelliler Sport Club
- Coached by: Hüseyin Polga
Medal record
Goalball
Representing Turkey
Paralympics
Bronze medal – third place	2012 London	team
IBSA World Championships and Games
Silver medal – second place	2011 Antalya	team
IBSA European Goalball Championship
Bronze medal – third place	2010 Assens	team
- Updated on 10 September 2012

Mehmet Cesur (born 24 March 1982 in Ankara, Turkey) is a Turkish national goalball player of class B2 and Paralympian.

== Sporting career ==
A member of Çankaya Belediyesi Görme Engelliler Sport Club, Mehmet Cesur played in Turkey's national team at the 2012 Summer Paralympics, which became bronze medalist.

== Achievements ==
Year	Competition	Venue	Position	Notes
Representing Turkey
2009	IBSA International Goalball Tournament	Manchester, United Kingdom	3rd	team
2011	IBSA International Goalball Tournament	Ghent, Belgium	3rd	team
2011	IBSA World Championships and Games	Antalya, Turkey	2nd	team
2011	Goalball UK Elite Tournament	Sheffield, United Kingdom	1st	team
2012	Summer Paralympics	London, United Kingdom	3rd	national team
