= Erkki Miinala =

Finnish Paralympic goalball player

Personal information
- Full name: Erkki Ilmari Miinala
- Born: 21 August 1993 (age 32) Kemi, Finland
- Height: 1.67 m (5 ft 6 in)
- Weight: 83 kg (183 lb)
Medal record
Men's goalball
Representing Finland
Paralympic Games
Gold medal – first place	2012 London	Team

Erkki Ilmari Miinala (born 19 August 1986 in Kemi) is a Finnish goalball player. He began playing at age ten, but did not become serious about the sport until 19. His visual impairment is due to retinitis pigmentosa which is an inherited, degenerative eye disease that causes severe vision impairment. Outside goalball he plays drums in a rock band and works as a transcriber. He was a member of Finland's gold medal-winning men's goalball team at the 2012 Summer Paralympics.
