= Nazan Akın =

Turkish para judoka (born 1983)

Nazan Akın Güneş
Personal information
- Nationality: Turkish
- Born: 1 September 1983 (age 42) Diyarbakır, Turkey
- Occupation: Judoka
- Weight: 70 kg (150 lb) (2012)

Sport
- Country: Turkey
- Sport: Para judo
- Disability class: J2
- Event: +70 kg
- Club: Ankara Göreneller Spor Kulübü
- Coached by: Meriç Özdeş, Yavuz Yolcu (national)
Medal record
Women's para judo
Representing Turkey
Paralympic Games
Silver medal – second place	2012 London	+70 kg
Bronze medal – third place	2024 Paris	+70 kg
IBSA World Judo Championships
Bronze medal – third place	2022 Baku	+70 kg
IBSA European Judo Championships
Bronze medal – third place	2011 Crawley	63 kg
European Para Championships
Silver medal – second place	2023 Rotterdam	+70 kg J1

Profile at external databases
- JudoInside.com: 89712
- Updated on 7 October 2024

Nazan Akın Güneş (born Nazan Akın; 1 September 1983 in Diyarbakır, Turkey) is a Turkish visually impaired judoka (disability class B3) competing in the +70 kg division. She won the silver medal at the 2012 Paralympics and the bronze medal at the 2024 Paralympics.

== Sport career ==
Nazan Akın took the bronze medal at the 2008 German Open.

In 2011, she competed in the 63 kg division at the IBSA World Championship and Games in Antalya, Turkey, where she finished in 7th place and at the IBSA European Championship held in Crawley, United Kingdom, where she won the bronze medal.

At the 2012 Summer Paralympics in London, England, Akın first succeeded in defeating her Bulgarian opponent Ivomira Mihaylova in the quarterfinal. In the semifinal, she also defeated French competitor Celine Manzuolini, securing her place in the final, where she went on to win the silver medal. After this, she took a 10-year break from judo.

In 2022, she participated at the IBSA Judo World Championships held in Baku, Azerbaijan, and won the bronze medal in the +70 kg division.

She won the silver medal at the 2023 European Para Championships in Rotterdam, Netherlands.

In 2024, she won the bronze medal at the Summer Paralympics held in Paris, France, by defeating her opponent Feruza Ergasheva 10-0 in the women +70 kg division.

== Personal life ==
Nazan Akın was born on September 1, 1983, in Diyarbakır.
