= Abdullah Aydoğdu =

Turkish goalball player (born 1991)

Personal information
- Nationality: Turkish
- Born: 27 September 1991 (age 34) Ankara, Turkey

Sport
- Sport: Goalball
- Event: class B3
- Club: Ankara Mithat Enç Görenkalpler Sport Club
- Coached by: Osman Karalı
Medal record
Goalball
Representing Turkey
Paralympics
Bronze medal – third place	2012 London	team
IBSA World Championships and Games
Silver medal – second place	2011 Antalya	team
IBSA European Goalball Championship
Bronze medal – third place	2010 Assens	team
- Updated on 4 September 2012

Abdullah Aydoğdu (born 27 September 1991 in Ankara) is a Turkish national goalball player of class B3 and Paralympian.

== Sporting career ==
A member of Ankara Mithat Enç Görenkalpler Sport Club, Aydoğdu played in Turkey's national team at the 2012 Summer Paralympics, which became bronze medalist.

== Achievements ==
Year	Competition	Venue	Position	Notes
Representing Turkey
2009	IBSA International Goalball Tournament	Manchester, United Kingdom	3rd	team
2010	IBSA European Goalball Championship	Assens, Denmark	3rd	team
2011	IBSA International Goalball Tournament	Ghent, Belgium	3rd	team
2011	IBSA World Championships and Games	Antalya, Turkey	2nd	team
2011	Goalball UK Elite Tournament	Sheffield, United Kingdom	1st	team
2012	Summer Paralympics	London, United Kingdom	3rd	national team
