= Tekin Okan Düzgün =

Turkish goalball player (born 1988)

Personal information
- Nationality: Turkish
- Born: 24 May 1988 (age 38) Ankara, Turkey

Sport
- Sport: Goalball
- Event: class B1
- Club: Ankara Goalball Sports Club
- Coached by: Gökhan İnce
Medal record
Goalball
Representing Turkey
Paralympics
Bronze medal – third place	2012 London	team
IBSA World Championships and Games
Silver medal – second place	2011 Antalya	team
IBSA European Goalball Championship
Bronze medal – third place	2010 Assens	team
Gold medal – first place	2007 Turkey	team
Silver medal – second place	2006 Bulgaria	team
- Updated on 8 September 2012

Tekin Okan Düzgün (born 24 May 1988, in Ankara) is a Turkish national goalball player of class B1 and Paralympian.

== Personal life ==
He is married to his club mate Gülşah Aktürk, a visually impaired sportswoman and national team player. The couple has a daughter Elif Bera born 2018.

== Sporting career ==
A member of Ankara Goalball Sports Club, Düzgün played in Turkey's national team at the 2012 Summer Paralympics, which became bronze medalist.

== Achievements ==
Year	Competition	Venue	Position	Notes
Representing Turkey
2005	IBSA World Junior Goalball Championship	United States	3rd	team
2006	IBSA European Goalball Championship	Bulgaria	2nd	team
2007	IBSA European Goalball Championship	Turkey	1st	team
2009	IBSA International Goalball Tournament	Manchester, United Kingdom	3rd	team
2010	IBSA European Goalball Championship	Assens, Denmark	3rd	team
2011	IBSA World Championships and Games	Antalya, Turkey	2nd	team
2011	Goalball UK Elite Tournament	Sheffield, United Kingdom	1st	team
2012	Summer Paralympics	London, United Kingdom	3rd	national team
