= Yusuf Uçar =

Turkish Paralympic goalball player

Personal information
- Nationality: Turkish
- Born: 1 January 1987 (age 39) Reyhanlı, Hatay Province, Turkey

Sport
- Sport: Goalball
- Event: class B1
- Club: İstanbul Visually Impaired People Sports Club
- Coached by: Zafer Adem
Medal record
Goalball
Representing Turkey
Paralympics
Bronze medal – third place	2012 London	team
IBSA World Championships and Games
Silver medal – second place	2011 Antalya	team
IBSA European Goalball Championship
Bronze medal – third place	2010 Assens	team
Gold medal – first place	2007 Turkey	team
Silver medal – second place	2006 Bulgaria	team
- Updated on 8 September 2012

Yusuf Uçar (born 1 January 1987, in Reyhanlı, Hatay Province, Turkey) is a Turkish national goalball player of class B1 and Paralympian.

== Sporting career ==
A member of İstanbul Visually Impaired People Sports Club, Uçar played in Turkey's national team at the 2012 Summer Paralympics, which became bronze medalist.

== Achievements ==
Year	Competition	Venue	Position	Notes
Representing Turkey
2005	IBSA World Junior Goalball Championship	United States	3rd	team
2006	IBSA European Goalball Championship	Bulgaria	2nd	team
2007	IBSA European Goalball Championship	Turkey	1st	team
2010	IBSA European Goalball Championship	Assens, Denmark	3rd	team
2011	IBSA World Championships and Games	Antalya, Turkey	2nd	team
2011	Goalball UK Elite Tournament	Sheffield, United Kingdom	1st	team
2012	Summer Paralympics	London, United Kingdom	3rd	national team
