= Hüseyin Alkan =

Turkish goalball player (born 1988)

Personal information
- Nationality: Turkish
- Born: 1 April 1988 (age 38) Küçükçekmece, Istanbul Province, Turkey

Sport
- Sport: Goalball
- Event: class B1
- Club: Erzurum Visually Impaired People Sports Club
- Coached by: Latif Barakçı
Medal record
Goalball
Representing Turkey
Paralympics
Bronze medal – third place	2012 London	team
IBSA World Championships and Games
Silver medal – second place	2011 Antalya	team
IBSA European Goalball Championship
Bronze medal – third place	2010 Assens	team
- Updated on 4 September 2012

Hüseyin Alkan (born 1 April 1988, in Küçükçekmece, Istanbul Province) is a Turkish national goalball player of class B1 and Paralympian.

He lost his eyesight at the age of 19 as a result of workplace accident.

== Sporting career ==
A member of Erzurum Visually Impaired People Sports Club, Alkan played in Turkey's national team at the 2012 Summer Paralympics, which became bronze medalist. He has also participated in the 2016 Summer Paralympics in Rio and the 2020 Summer Paralympics in Tokyo.

== Achievements ==
Year	Competition	Venue	Position	Notes
Representing Turkey
2009	IBSA International Goalball Tournament	Manchester, United Kingdom	3rd	team
2010	IBSA European Goalball Championship	Assens, Denmark	3rd	team
2011	IBSA International Goalball Tournament	Ghent, Belgium	3rd	team
2011	IBSA World Championships and Games	Antalya, Turkey	2nd	team
2011	Goalball UK Elite Tournament	Sheffield, United Kingdom	1st	team
2012	Summer Paralympics	London, United Kingdom	3rd	national team
