= Goalball at the 2012 Summer Paralympics =

Goalball at the XIV Paralympic Games
- Venue: Copper Box Arena
- Dates: 29 August – 9 September 2012
- Competitors: 132

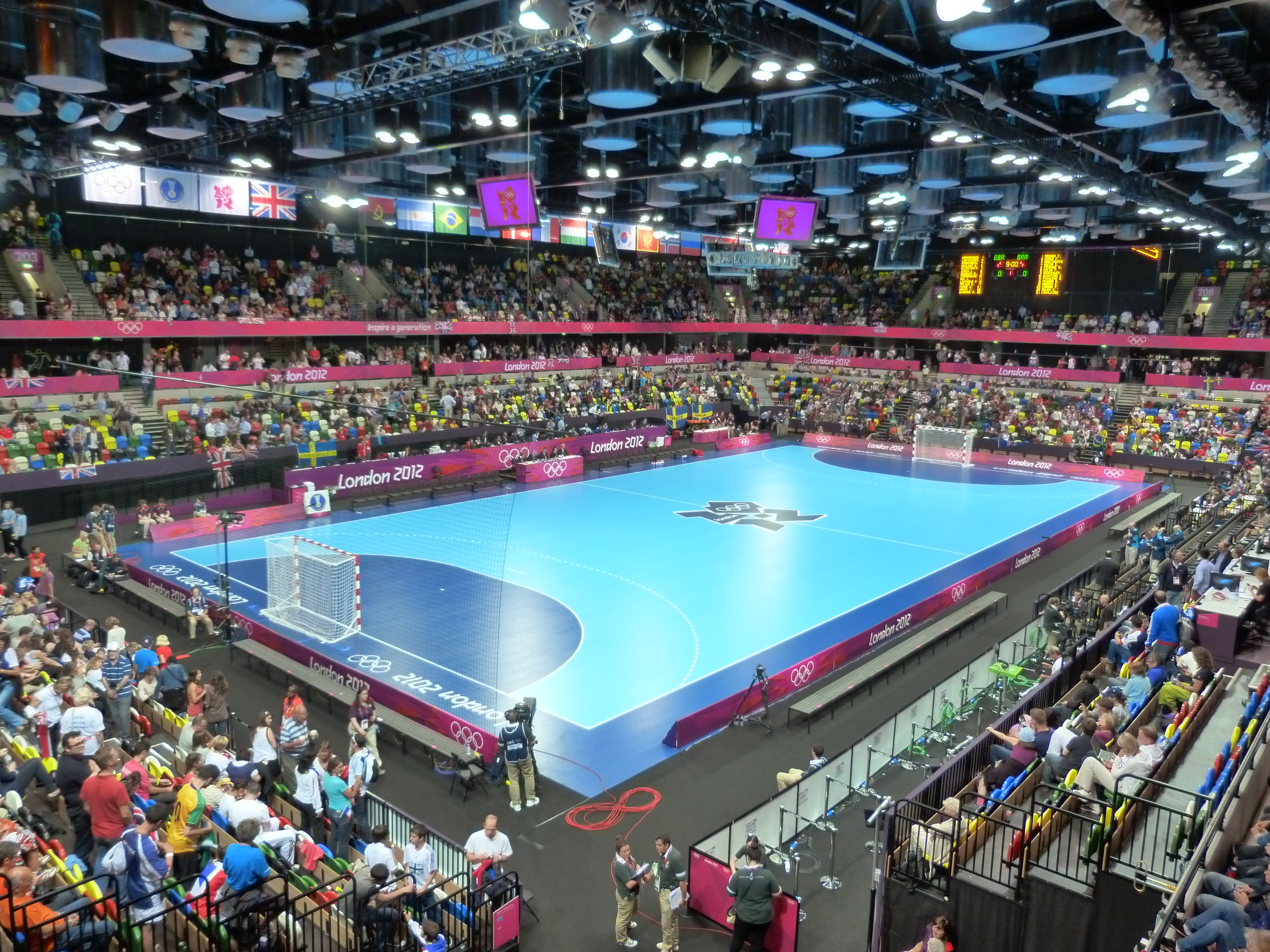
The Copper Box area which was to be used for goalball at the 2012 Summer Paralympic Games.

Goalball at the 2012 Summer Paralympics was held in London from 29 August to 9 September 2012.

== Medalists ==
| Event | Gold | Silver | Bronze |
|---|---|---|---|
| Men's goalball | Finland (FIN); Jarno Mattila; Ville Montonen; Erkki Miinala; Toni Alenius; Tuomas Nousu; Petri Posio | Brazil (BRA); José Ferreira de Oliveira; Almeida Maciel Celente; Leomon Moreno da Silva; Romário Diego Marques; Filippe Santos Silvestre; Leandro Moreno da Silva | Turkey (TUR); Tekin Okan Düzgün; Hüseyin Alkan; Mehmet Cesur; Yusuf Uçar; Abdullah Aydoğdu; Tuncay Karakaya |
| Women's goalball | Japan (JPN); Masae Komiya; Rie Urata; Akane Nakashima; Eiko Kakehata; Haruka Wakasugi; Akiko Adachi | China (CHN); Wang Ruixue; Chen Fengqing; Lin Shan; Wang Shasha; Fan Feifei; Ju Zhen | Sweden (SWE); Anna Dahlberg; Malin Gustavsson; Josefine Jälmestål; Viktoria Andersson; Sofia Näsström; Maria Wåglund |

== Qualifying ==
=== Men ===
| Means of qualification | Date | Venue | Berths | Qualified |
|---|---|---|---|---|
| Host nation | | | 1 | Great Britain (GBR) |
| 2010 IBSA Goalball World Championships | 18–25 June 2010 | Sheffield, Great Britain | 3 | Lithuania (LTU); China (CHN); Iran (IRI) |
| 2010 Asian Para Games | 12–19 December 2010 | Guangzhou, China | 1 | South Korea (KOR) |
| 2011 Paralympic Qualification Tournament | 1–11 April 2011 | Antalya, Turkey | 4 | Finland (FIN); Turkey (TUR); Canada (CAN); Belgium (BEL) |
| 2011 European Championships | 17–23 October 2011 | Assens, Denmark | 1 | Sweden (SWE) |
| 2011 Africa Oceania Goalball Regional Championships | 14–18 November 2011 | Sydney, Australia | 1 | Algeria (ALG) |
| 2011 Parapan American Games | 12–20 November 2011 | Guadalajara, Mexico | 1 | Brazil (BRA) |
| Total | | | 12 | |

=== Women ===
| Means of qualification | Date | Venue | Berths | Qualified |
|---|---|---|---|---|
| Host nation | | | 1 | Great Britain (GBR) |
| 2010 IBSA Goalball World Championships | 18–25 June 2010 | Sheffield, Great Britain | 3 | China (CHN); United States (USA); Sweden (SWE) |
| Asian Para Games | 12–19 December 2010 | Guangzhou, China | 1 | Japan (JPN) |
| 2011 Paralympic Qualification Tournament | 1–11 April 2011 | Antalya, Turkey | 2 | Canada (CAN); Finland (FIN) |
| 2011 European Championships | 17–23 October 2011 | Assens, Denmark | 1 | Denmark (DEN) |
| 2011 Africa Oceania Goalball Regional Championships | 14–18 November 2011 | Sydney, Australia | 1 | Australia (AUS) |
| 2011 Parapan American Games | 12–20 November 2011 | Guadalajara, Mexico | 1 | Brazil (BRA) |
| Total | | | 10 | |

== Men's tournament ==
=== Competition format ===
The twelve men's teams were divided into two equal groups for a single round robin group stage. The top four teams of each group advanced to the quarter-finals. All matches in the second stage were knock-out format.

=== Group stage ===
==== Group A ====
| Team | Pld | W | D | L | GF | GA | GD | Pts | Qualification |
|---|---|---|---|---|---|---|---|---|---|
| Turkey | 5 | 4 | 1 | 0 | 26 | 6 | +20 | 13 | Quarterfinals |
| Brazil | 5 | 3 | 0 | 2 | 30 | 20 | +10 | 9 | Quarterfinals |
| Lithuania | 5 | 2 | 2 | 1 | 33 | 20 | +13 | 8 | Quarterfinals |
| Finland | 5 | 2 | 0 | 3 | 16 | 24 | −8 | 6 | Quarterfinals |
| Sweden | 5 | 1 | 2 | 2 | 16 | 25 | −9 | 5 | Eliminated |
| Great Britain | 5 | 0 | 1 | 4 | 9 | 35 | −26 | 1 | Eliminated |

Source: "London 2012 Paralympic Games - Goalball results" (PDF). Paralympic.org. 3 October 2012 – via Goalball.sport.

Thu 30 Aug
| Lithuania | 11 – 1 | Great Britain |
| Finland | 5 – 6 | Brazil |
| Turkey | 9 – 2 | Sweden |
Fri 31 Aug
| Lithuania | 10 – 0 | Finland |
| Great Britain (United Kingdom) | 1 – 7 | Turkey |
| Brazil | 4 – 5 | Sweden |
Sat 01 Sep
| Turkey | 4 – 0 | Finland |
| Sweden | 3 – 3 | Great Britain |
| Brazil | 12 – 5 | Lithuania |
Sun 02 Sep
| Great Britain (United Kingdom) | 3 – 7 | Finland |
| Sweden | 5 – 5 | Lithuania |
| Turkey | 4 – 1 | Brazil |
Tue 04 Sep
| Finland | 4 – 1 | Sweden |
| Great Britain (United Kingdom) | 1 – 7 | Brazil |
| Lithuania | 2 – 2 | Turkey |

==== Group B ====
| Team | Pld | W | D | L | GF | GA | GD | Pts | Qualification |
|---|---|---|---|---|---|---|---|---|---|
| Iran | 5 | 4 | 0 | 1 | 32 | 20 | +12 | 12 | Quarterfinals |
| China | 5 | 3 | 1 | 1 | 20 | 14 | +6 | 10 | Quarterfinals |
| Belgium | 5 | 3 | 1 | 1 | 19 | 16 | +3 | 10 | Quarterfinals |
| Algeria | 5 | 2 | 0 | 3 | 18 | 17 | +1 | 6 | Quarterfinals |
| South Korea | 5 | 1 | 0 | 4 | 18 | 28 | −10 | 3 | Eliminated |
| Canada | 5 | 1 | 0 | 4 | 16 | 28 | −12 | 3 | Eliminated |

Source: "London 2012 Paralympic Games - Goalball results" (PDF). Paralympic.org. 3 October 2012 – via Goalball.sport.

Thu 30 Aug
| China | 5 – 9 | Iran |
| South Korea | 4 – 3 | Algeria |
| Canada | 2 – 4 | Belgium |
Fri 31 Aug
| China | 11 – 4 | South Korea |
| Iran | 9 – 2 | Canada |
| Algeria | 5 – 2 | Belgium |
Sat 01 Sep
| Canada | 5 – 4 | South Korea |
| Belgium | 8 – 6 | Iran |
| Algeria | 0 – 1 | China |
Sun 02 Sep
| Iran | 4 – 3 | South Korea |
| Belgium | 0 – 0 | China |
| Canada | 6 – 8 | Algeria |
Mon 03 Sep
| South Korea | 3 – 5 | Belgium |
| Iran | 4 – 2 | Algeria |
| China | 3 – 1 | Canada |

=== Knockout round ===
Quarterfinals
Turkey | 3
Algeria | 1
Iran | 1
Finland | 5
Brazil | 3
Belgium | 0
China | 4
Lithuania | 12

Semifinals
Turkey | 0
Finland | 2
Brazil | 2
Lithuania | 1

Finals
Finland | 8
Brazil | 1
Third place
Turkey | 4
Lithuania | 1

== Women's tournament ==
=== Competition format ===
The ten women's teams were divided into two equal groups for a single round robin group stage. The top four teams of each group advanced to the quarter-finals. All matches in the second stage were knock-out format.

=== Group stage ===
==== Group C ====
| Team | Pld | W | D | L | GF | GA | GD | Pts | Qualification |
|---|---|---|---|---|---|---|---|---|---|
| China | 4 | 4 | 0 | 0 | 28 | 4 | +24 | 12 | Quarterfinals |
| Great Britain | 4 | 2 | 1 | 1 | 10 | 9 | +1 | 7 | Quarterfinals |
| Brazil | 4 | 2 | 0 | 2 | 8 | 15 | −7 | 6 | Quarterfinals |
| Finland | 4 | 1 | 1 | 2 | 10 | 13 | −3 | 4 | Quarterfinals |
| Denmark | 4 | 0 | 0 | 4 | 3 | 18 | −15 | 0 | Eliminated |

Source: "London 2012 Paralympic Games - Goalball results" (PDF). Paralympic.org. 3 October 2012 – via Goalball.sport.

Thu 30 Aug
| China | 7 – 1 | Great Britain |
| Denmark | 0 – 2 | Brazil |
Fri 31 Aug
| Finland | 1 – 1 | Great Britain |
| Brazil | 0 – 8 | China |
Sat 01 Sep
| Denmark | 2 – 3 | Finland |
Sun 02 Sep
| Great Britain (United Kingdom) | 3 – 1 | Brazil |
Mon 03 Sep
| China | 8 – 1 | Denmark |
| Brazil | 5 – 4 | Finland |
Tue 04 Sep
| Great Britain (United Kingdom) | 5 – 0 | Denmark |
| Finland | 2 – 5 | China |

==== Group D ====
| Team | Pld | W | D | L | GF | GA | GD | Pts | Qualification |
|---|---|---|---|---|---|---|---|---|---|
| Canada | 4 | 3 | 0 | 1 | 6 | 3 | +3 | 9 | Quarterfinals |
| Japan | 4 | 2 | 1 | 1 | 5 | 3 | +2 | 7 | Quarterfinals |
| Sweden | 4 | 2 | 1 | 1 | 11 | 11 | 0 | 7 | Quarterfinals |
| United States | 4 | 2 | 0 | 2 | 9 | 4 | +5 | 6 | Quarterfinals |
| Australia | 4 | 0 | 0 | 4 | 7 | 17 | −10 | 0 | Eliminated |

Source: "London 2012 Paralympic Games - Goalball results" (PDF). Paralympic.org. 3 October 2012 – via Goalball.sport.

Thu 30 Aug
| United States | 5 – 1 | Sweden |
Fri 31 Aug
| Australia | 1 – 3 | Japan |
Sat 01 Sep
| Canada | 1 – 2 | Sweden |
| Japan | 2 – 1 | United States |
Sun 02 Sep
| Australia | 1 – 3 | Canada |
| Sweden | 0 – 0 | Japan |
Mon 03 Sep
| United States | 3 – 0 | Australia |
| Japan | 0 – 1 | Canada |
Tue 04 Sep
| Sweden | 8 – 5 | Australia |
| Canada | 1 – 0 | United States |

=== Knockout round ===
Quarterfinals
1 | China | 5
8 | United States | 0
4 | Finland | 2
5 | Canada | 1
2 | Great Britain | 1
7 | Sweden | 2
3 | Japan | 2
6 | Brazil | 0

Semifinals
China | 4
Finland | 1
Sweden | 3
Japan | 4

Finals
China | 0
Japan | 1
Third place
Finland | 1
Sweden | 5

== Gallery ==
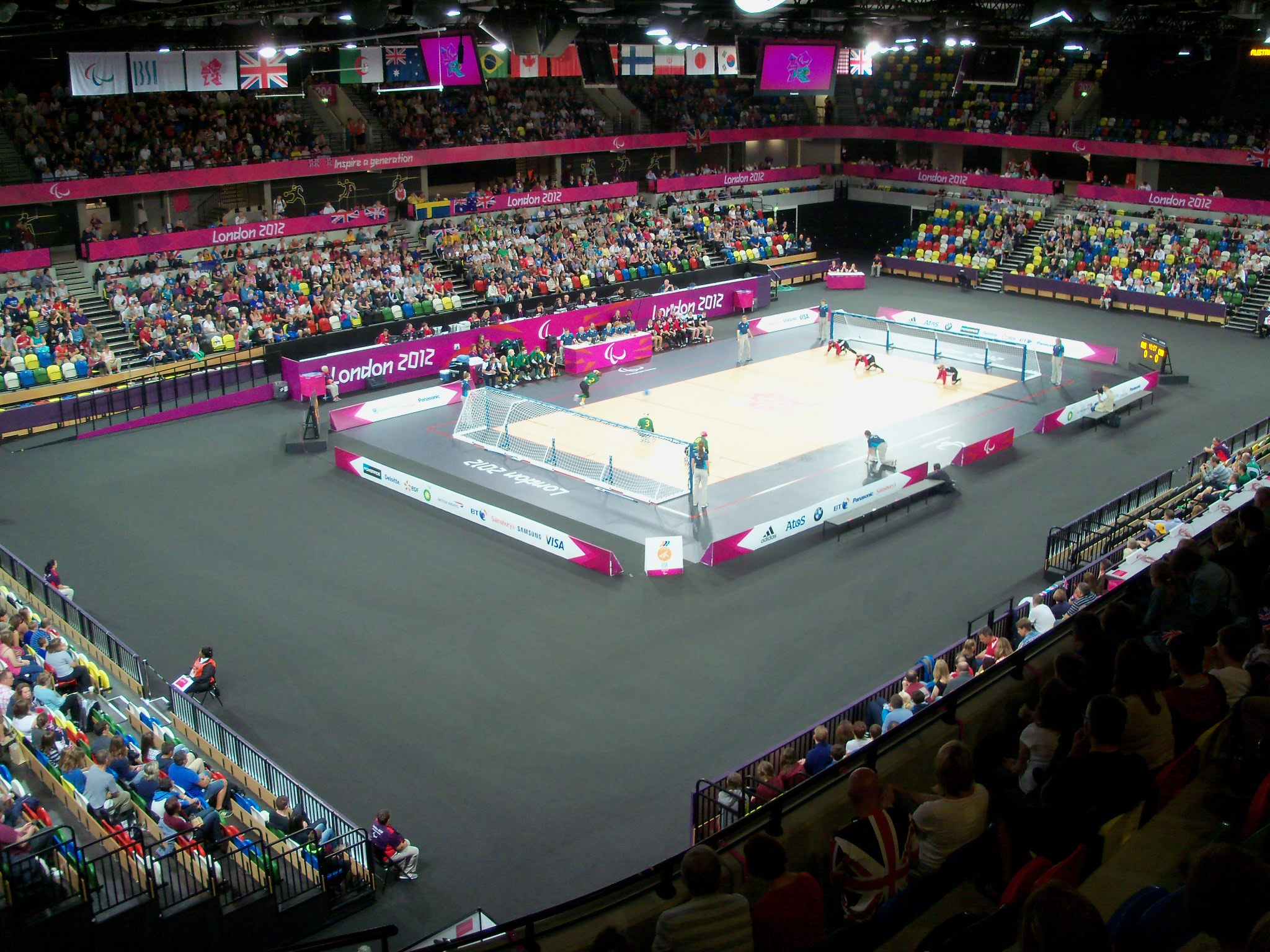
Australia goalball women throwing to Canada women (Sep 2012).

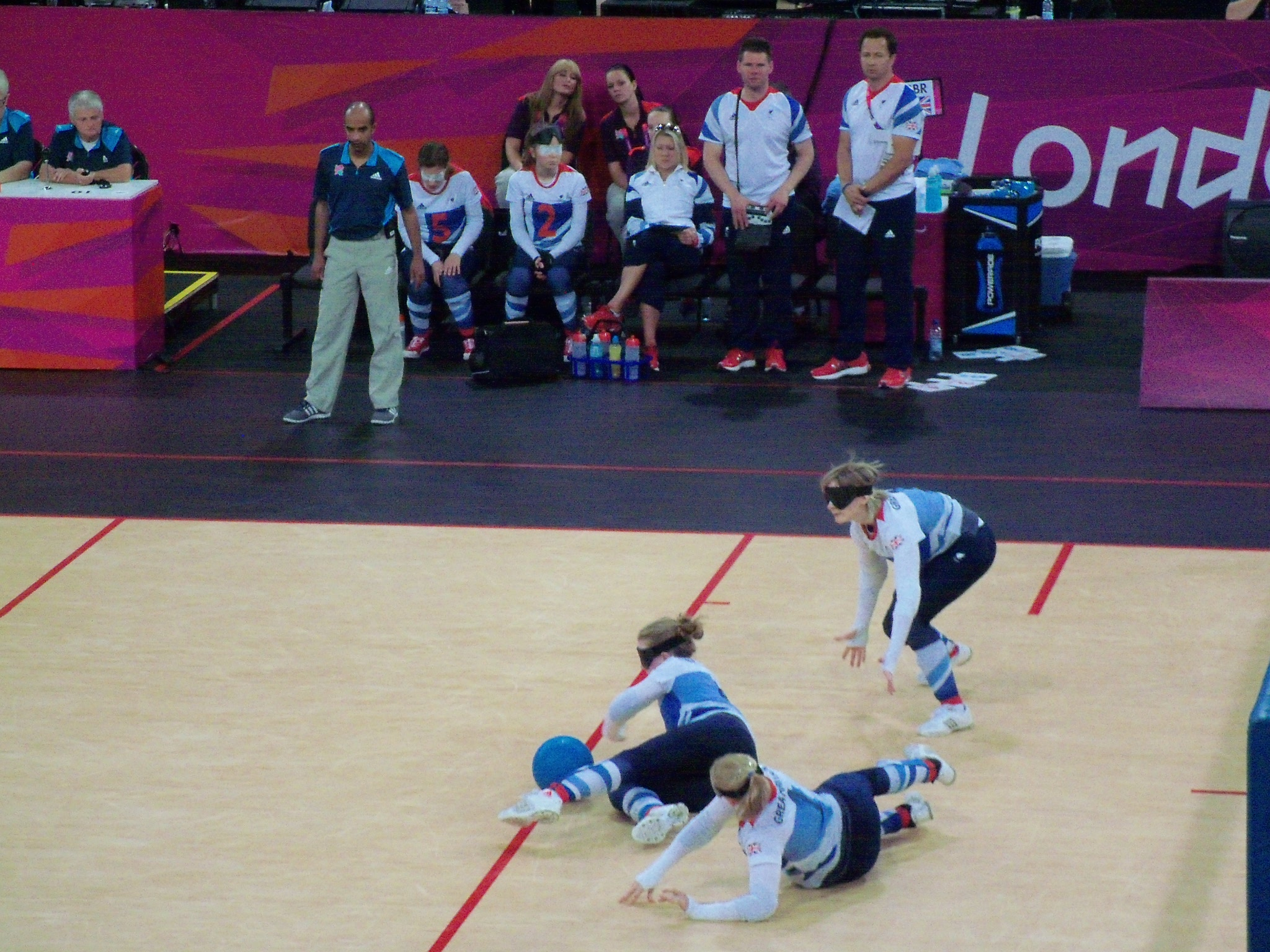
Great Britain women's goalball team defending (Sep 2012).

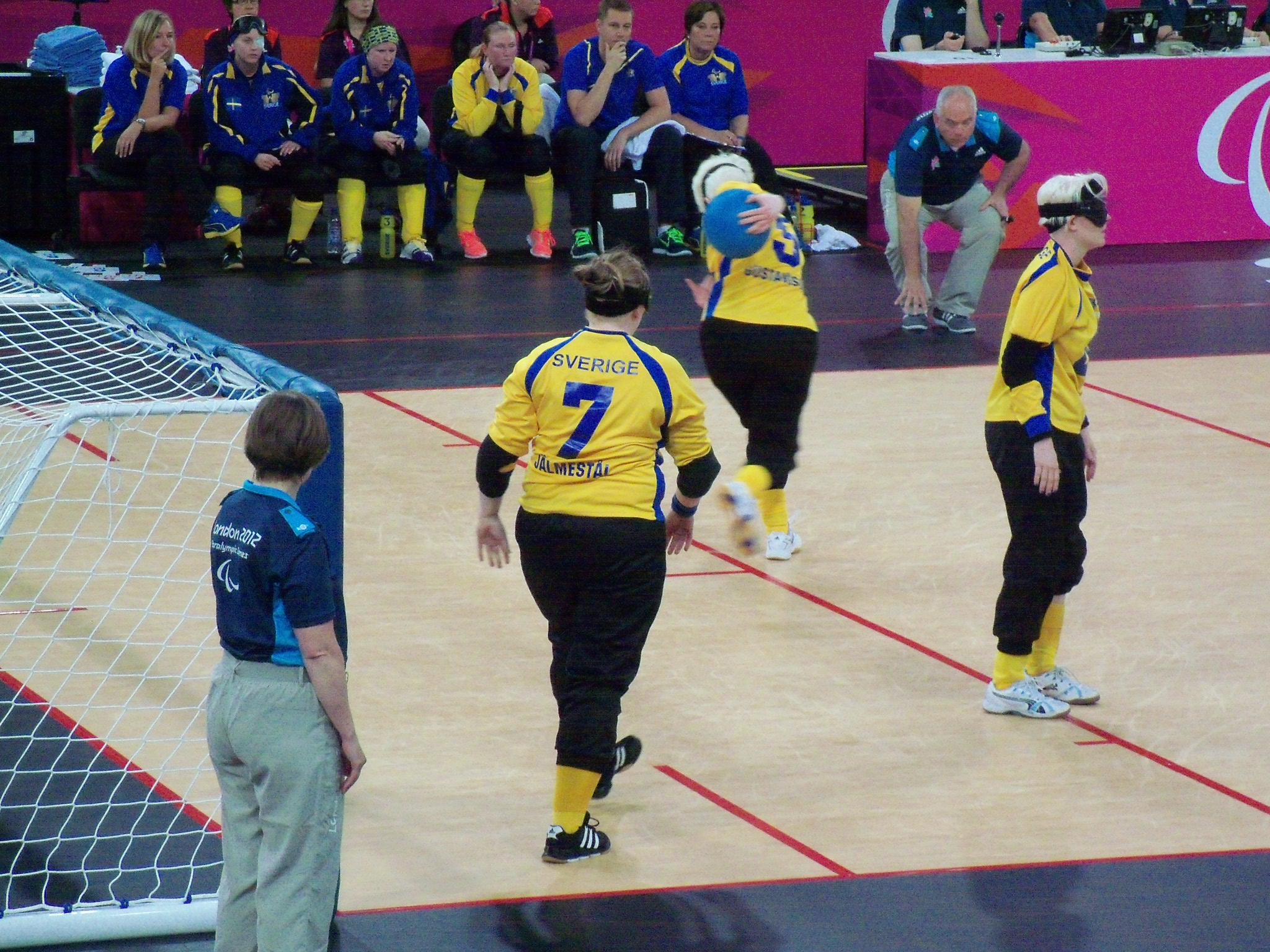
Swedish women's goalball team throwing (Sep 2012).

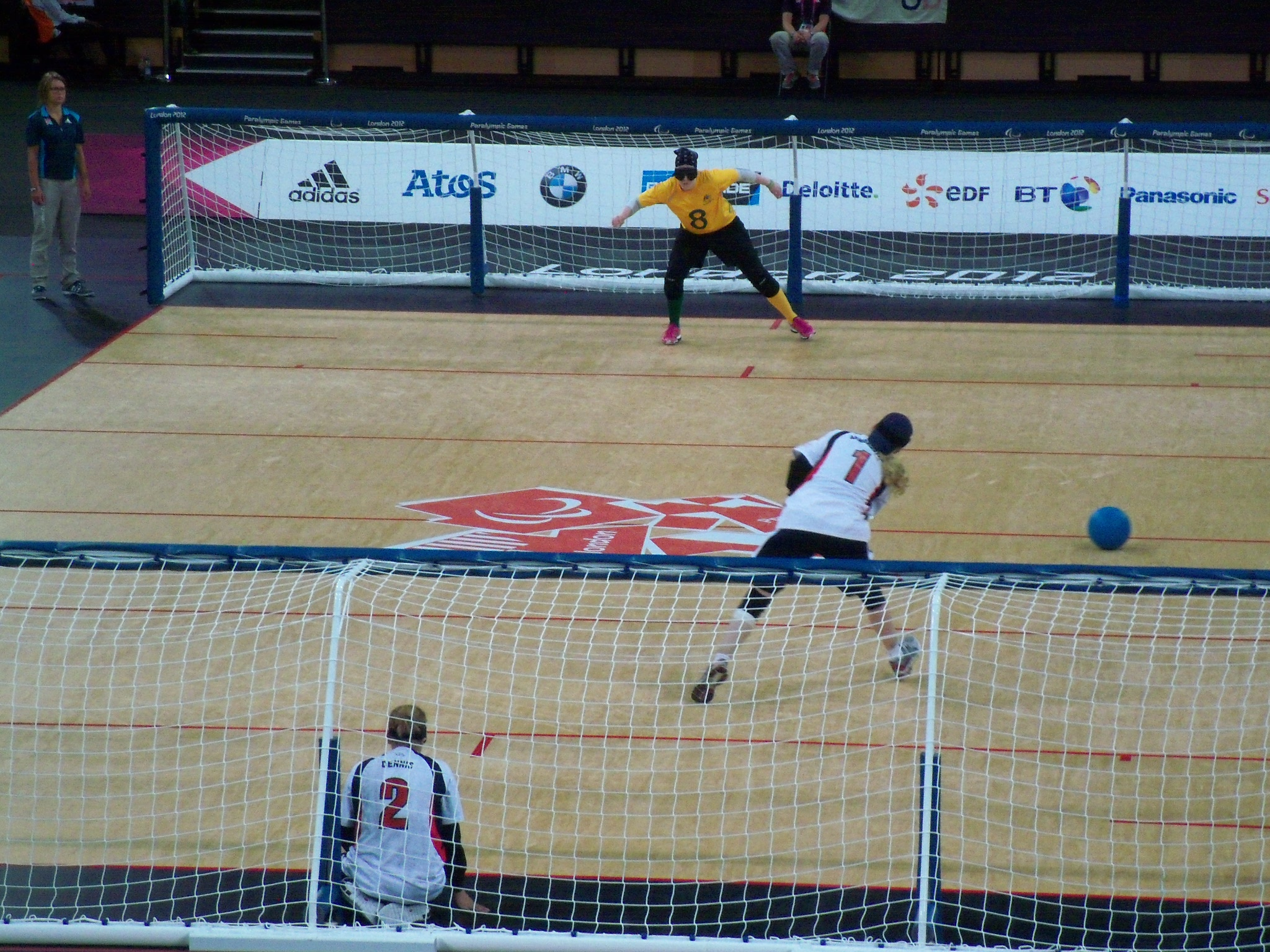
USA women throwing to AUS F (Sep 2012).

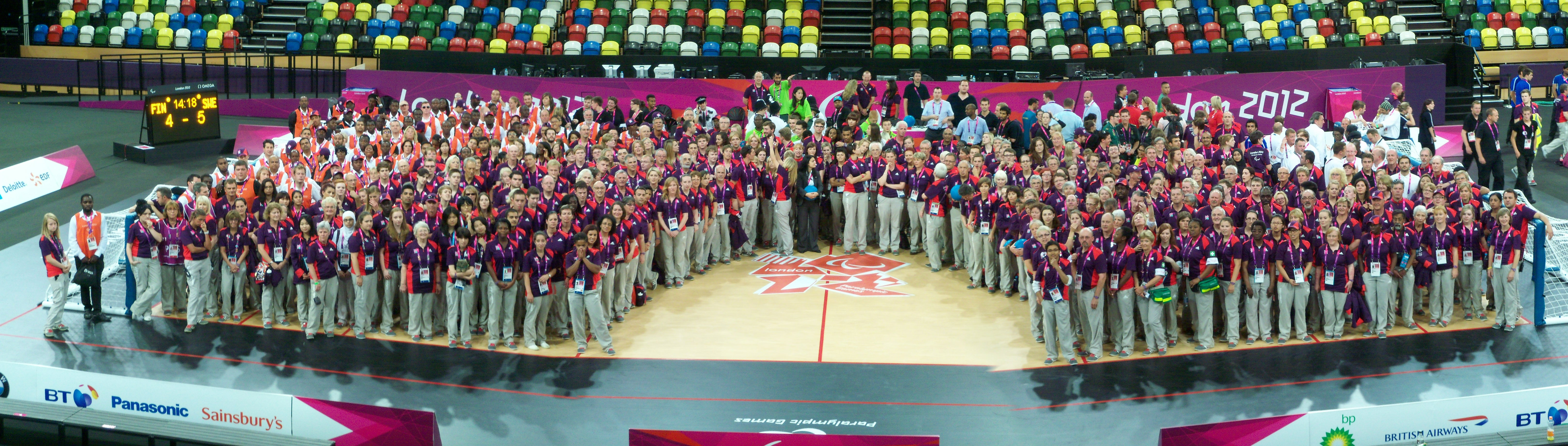
All the volunteers ('Games makers') for goalball, in the Copper Box arena (Sep 2012).
