= Yuan Yanping =

Chinese judoka (born 1976)

Personal information
- Born: 4 April 1976 (age 50) Dalian, Liaoning
- Occupation: Judoka

Sport
- Sport: Judo
Medal record
Women's judo
Representing China
Paralympic Games
| Gold medal – first place | 2008 Beijing | +70 kg |
| Gold medal – first place | 2012 London | +70 kg |
| Gold medal – first place | 2016 Rio de Janeiro | +70 kg |
Asian Para Games
| Gold medal – first place | 2014 Incheon | +70 kg |

Profile at external databases
- JudoInside.com: 10562

Yuan Yanping (born 4 April 1976) is a Chinese judoka, a practitioner of judo. She won a gold medal in the Women's +70 kg event at the 2008 Summer Paralympics. She won a gold medal in the same event at the 2012 Summer Paralympics and again at the 2016 Summer Paralympics.
