= Tuncay Karakaya =

Turkish goalball player (born 1989)

Personal information
- Nationality: Turkish
- Born: 1 October 1989 (age 36) Korkut, Muş Province, Turkey

Sport
- Sport: Goalball
- Event: class B1
- Club: Ankara Goalball Spor Kulübü
- Coached by: Gökhan İnce
Medal record
Goalball
Representing Turkey
Paralympics
Bronze medal – third place	2012 London	team
IBSA World Championships and Games
Silver medal – second place	2011 Antalya	team
IBSA European Goalball Championship
Bronze medal – third place	2010 Assens	team
- Updated on 4 September 2012

Tuncay Karakaya (born 1 October 1989, in Korkut, Muş Province, Turkey) is a Turkish national goalball player of class B1 and Paralympian.

== Sporting career ==
A member of Ankara Goalball Sports Club, Karakaya played in Turkey's national team at the 2012 Summer Paralympics, which became bronze medalist.

== Achievements ==
Year	Competition	Venue	Position	Notes
Representing Turkey
2009	IBSA International Goalball Tournament	Manchester, United Kingdom	3rd	team
2010	IBSA European Goalball Championship	Assens, Denmark	3rd	team
2011	IBSA International Goalball Tournament	Ghent, Belgium	3rd	team
2011	IBSA World Championships and Games	Antalya, Turkey	2nd	team
2011	Goalball UK Elite Tournament	Sheffield, United Kingdom	1st	team
2012	Summer Paralympics	London, United Kingdom	3rd	national team
