= Celine Manzuoli =

French Paralympic judoka (born 1973)

Personal information
- Born: 20 January 1973 (age 53) Rome, Italy
- Home town: Clermont-Ferrand, France

Sport
- Country: France
- Sport: Para judo
Medal record
Para judo
Representing France
World Championships
Bronze medal – third place	2011 Antalya	Women's +78kg
European Championships
Bronze medal – third place	2011 Crawley	Women's +78kg

Celine Manzuoli (born 20 January 1973) is a retired French Paralympic judoka who competed in international level events. She was a World and European bronze medalist in the women's heavyweight category and has participated at the 2008 and 2012 Summer Paralympics but did not medal.
