= Lithuania at the Paralympics =

- IPC code: LTU
- NPC: Lithuanian Paralympic Committee
- Website: www.lpok.lt
- Medals: Gold 6 Silver 12 Bronze 19 Total 37

Summer appearances
- 1992; 1996; 2000; 2004; 2008; 2012; 2016; 2020; 2024

Winter appearances
- 1994; 1998–2022; 2026

Other related appearances
- Soviet Union (1988)

Lithuania, following its independence from the Soviet Union, made its Paralympic Games début at the 1992 Summer Paralympics in Barcelona, with a delegation of four athletes in track and field. This first delegation was notably successful, with all four athletes winning at least one medal, and female runner Sigita Kriaučiūnienė sweeping up four medals (three silver and a bronze). Kriaučiūnienė was also part of Lithuania's two person delegation for its first participation in the Winter Paralympics, in 1994. Lithuania has taken part in every subsequent edition of the Summer Paralympics, but had not returned to the Winter Games after 1994 until 2026.

== Medal tallies ==
Lithuanians have won a total of thirty-seven Paralympic medals (of which six gold, twelve silver and nineteen bronze), making it the most successful of the Baltic states. All these medals have been won at the Summer Games. Most of them have been won in track and field, but Lithuanians have also had some success in other sports. Jonas Stoškus has twice won bronze in judo (in 1996 and 2004), while Kęstutis Skučas won a silver medal in swimming in 2004, and the Lithuanian men's goalball team won silver in both 2000 and 2008.

=== Summer Paralympics ===
Event	Gold	Silver	Bronze	Total	Ranking
1992 Summer Paralympics	0	4	3	7	42nd
1996 Summer Paralympics	3	2	6	11	34th
2000 Summer Paralympics	0	2	1	3	56th
2004 Summer Paralympics	1	1	5	7	50th
2008 Summer Paralympics	0	2	0	2	56th
2012 Summer Paralympics	0	0	0	0	-
2016 Summer Paralympics	2	1	0	3	44th
2020 Summer Paralympics	0	0	3	3	76th
2024 Summer Paralympics	0	0	1	1	79th

=== Winter Paralympics ===
Event	Gold	Silver	Bronze	Total	Ranking
1994 Winter Paralympics	0	0	0	0	-
2026 Winter Paralympics	0	0	0	0	-

=== Medals by sport ===
Sport	Gold	Silver	Bronze	Total
Athletics	5	9	13	27
Goalball	1	2	1	4
Swimming	0	1	1	2
Judo	0	0	4	4
Totals (4 entries)	6	12	19	37

== Medalists ==
Medal	Name	Games	Sport	Event
Silver	Vytautas Girnius	(Spain) 1992 Barcelona	Athletics	Men's pentathlon B1
Silver	Sigita Kriaučiūnienė	(Spain) 1992 Barcelona	Athletics	Women's 800m B1
Silver	Sigita Kriaučiūnienė	(Spain) 1992 Barcelona	Athletics	Women's 1500m B1
Silver	Sigita Kriaučiūnienė	(Spain) 1992 Barcelona	Athletics	Women's 3000m B1
Bronze	Sigita Kriaučiūnienė	(Spain) 1992 Barcelona	Athletics	Women's 400m B1
Bronze	Danutė Smidek	(Spain) 1992 Barcelona	Athletics	Women's 800m B2
Bronze	Malda Baumgartė	(Spain) 1992 Barcelona	Athletics	Women's pentathlon PW3-4
Gold	Aldona Grigaliūnienė	(United States) 1996 Atlanta	Athletics	Women's long jump F34-37
Gold	Malda Baumgartė	(United States) 1996 Atlanta	Athletics	Women's discus throw F41
Gold	Malda Baumgartė	(United States) 1996 Atlanta	Athletics	Women's shot put F41
Silver	Kęstutis Bartkėnas	(United States) 1996 Atlanta	Athletics	Men's 5000m T11
Silver	Vytautas Girnius	(United States) 1996 Atlanta	Athletics	Men's javelin throw F10
Bronze	Saulius Leonavičius	(United States) 1996 Atlanta	Athletics	Men's 1500m T11
Bronze	Kęstutis Bartkėnas	(United States) 1996 Atlanta	Athletics	Men's 10000m T11
Bronze	Ronaldas Urbonas	(United States) 1996 Atlanta	Athletics	Men's shot put F12
Bronze	Sigita Kriaučiūnienė	(United States) 1996 Atlanta	Athletics	Women's 800m T10-11
Bronze	Sigita Kriaučiūnienė	(United States) 1996 Atlanta	Athletics	Women's 1500m T10-11
Bronze	Jonas Stoskus	(United States) 1996 Atlanta	Judo	Men's -78 kg
Silver	Rolandas Urbonas	(Australia) 2000 Sydney	Athletics	Men's discus throw F12
Silver	Egidijus Biknevicius; Arvydas Juchna; Algirdas Montvydas; Genrik Pavliukianec; Marius Zibolis	(Australia) 2000 Sydney	Goalball	Men's team
Bronze	Kęstutis Bartkėnas	(Australia) 2000 Sydney	Athletics	Men's 5000m T13
Gold	Aldona Grigaliūnienė	(Greece) 2004 Athens	Athletics	Women's shot put F37/38
Silver	Kestutis Skucas	(Greece) 2004 Athens	Swimming	Men's 50m backstroke S4
Bronze	Kęstutis Bartkėnas	(Greece) 2004 Athens	Athletics	Men's 10000m T13
Bronze	Linas Balsys	(Greece) 2004 Athens	Athletics	Men's marathon T13
Bronze	Rolandas Urbonas	(Greece) 2004 Athens	Athletics	Men's discus throw F12
Bronze	Algirdas Tatulis	(Greece) 2004 Athens	Athletics	Men's discus throw F42
Bronze	Jonas Stoskus	(Greece) 2004 Athens	Judo	Men's -90 kg
Silver	Aldona Grigaliūnienė	(China) 2008 Beijing	Athletics	Women's shot put F37/38
Silver	Arvydas Juchna; Saulius Leonavicius; Nerijus Montvydas; Genrik Pavliukianec; Zydrunas Simkus; Marius Zibolis	(China) 2008 Beijing	Goalball	Men's team
Gold	Mindaugas Bilius	(Brazil) 2016 Rio de Janeiro	Athletics	Men's shot put F37
Gold	Mantas Brazauskis; Nerijus Montvydas; Mantas Panovas; Genrik Pavliukianec; Justas Pazarauskas; Mindaugas Suchovejus	(Brazil) 2016 Rio de Janeiro	Goalball	Men's team
Silver	Mindaugas Bilius	(Brazil) 2016 Rio de Janeiro	Athletics	Men's discus throw F37

== See also ==
- Lithuania at the Olympics
