= Lithuania at the 2008 Summer Paralympics =

- IPC code: LTU
- NPC: Lithuanian Paralympic Committee
- Website: www.lpok.lt

in Beijing
- Competitors: 27 in 5 sports
- Medals Ranked 56th: Gold 0 Silver 2 Bronze 0 Total 2

Summer Paralympics appearances (overview)
- 1992; 1996; 2000; 2004; 2008; 2012; 2016; 2020; 2024

Other related appearances
- Soviet Union (1988)

Lithuania competed at the 2008 Summer Paralympics in Beijing, China.

== Medalists ==
Medal	Name	Sport	Event
Silver	Aldona Grigaliuniene	Athletics	Women's Shot Put - F37/38
Silver	Arcydas Juchna; Saulius Leonavicius; Nerijus Montvydas; Genrik Pavliukianec; Zydrunas Simkus; Marius Zibolis	Goalball	Men's team

== Sports ==
=== Athletics ===
==== Men's track ====
Athlete	Class	Event	Heats		Semifinal		Final	
Athlete	Class	Event	Result	Rank	Result	Rank	Result	Rank
Linas Balsys	T12	10000m	—				DNF	
Linas Balsys	T12	Marathon	—				2:39:55	12

==== Men's field ====
Athlete	Class	Event	Final		
Athlete	Class	Event	Result	Points	Rank
Algirdas Tatulis	F42	Discus throw	35.38	-	10
Rolandas Urbonas	F11-12	Discus throw	44.41	874	7
Rolandas Urbonas	F11-12	Shot put	14.72	908	7

==== Women's field ====
Athlete	Class	Event	Final		
Athlete	Class	Event	Result	Points	Rank
Ramune Adomaitiene	F35-38	Javelin throw	NMR		
Ramune Adomaitiene	F37-38	Shot put	10.03	878	11
Malda Baumgarte	F57-58	Javelin throw	20.72	703	11
Aldona Grigaliuniene	F37-38	Discus throw	26.73	902	8
Aldona Grigaliuniene	F37-38	Shot put	12.58	1102	2nd place, silver medalist(s)
Irena Perminiene	F54-56	Shot put	5.97	962	6
Dangute Skeriene	F12-13	Shot put	10.17	815	8

=== Goalball ===
The men's team won the silver medal after losing in the gold medal match against China.

==== Players ====
- Arvydas Juchna
- Saulius Leonavicius
- Nerijus Montvydas
- Genrik Pavliukianec
- Zydrunas Simkus
- Marius Zibolis

==== Tournament ====
7 September 2008

Lithuania	9 - 5	Belgium

Beijing Institute of Technology Gymnasium
8 September 2008

Finland	5 - 15	Lithuania

Beijing Institute of Technology Gymnasium
9 September 2008

Lithuania	10 - 0	Spain

Beijing Institute of Technology Gymnasium
10 September 2008

Denmark	1 - 10	Lithuania

Beijing Institute of Technology Gymnasium
11 September 2008

Lithuania	6 - 7	Slovenia

Beijing Institute of Technology Gymnasium

Quarterfinals

12 September 2008

Canada	0 - 10	Lithuania

Beijing Institute of Technology Gymnasium

Semifinals

13 September 2008

Lithuania	10 - 3	Sweden

Beijing Institute of Technology Gymnasium

Gold medal match

14 September 2008

China	9 - 8	Lithuania

Beijing Institute of Technology Gymnasium

=== Judo ===
Athlete	Event	Preliminary	Quarterfinals	Semifinals	Repechage round 1	Repechage round 2	Final/ Bronze medal contest
Athlete	Event	Opposition Result	Opposition Result	Opposition Result	Opposition Result	Opposition Result	Opposition Result
Jonas Stoskus	Men's 90kg	Mammadov (AZE); L 0000–0211	—		Junk (GER); L 0000-1102	did not advance	

=== Swimming ===
==== Men ====
Athlete	Class	Event	Heats		Final	
Athlete	Class	Event	Result	Rank	Result	Rank
Andrius Bickauskas	S1	50m backstroke	—		2:27.68	5
Kestutis Skucas	S4	50m freestyle	49.56	11	did not advance	
Kestutis Skucas	S4	200m freestyle	3:55.82	9	did not advance	
Kestutis Skucas	S4	50m backstroke	49.67	4 Q	50.59	5

=== Volleyball ===
==== Women's tournament ====
The women's volleyball team didn't win any medals; they were 6th out of 8 teams.

Players

- Malda Baumgarde
- Liudmila Budiniene
- Ruta Cvirkiene
- Virginija Dmitrijeva
- Rita Latauskaite
- Karolina Lingyte
- Neringa Susinskyte
- Jolita Urbutiene
- Jurate Verbuviene
- Virginija Ziltye

Group B Matches

7 September 2008; 9:00	Lithuania (LTU)	0–3	United States (USA)	China Agricultural University Gymnasium
7 September 2008; 9:00	(15–25, 18–25, 09–25)			China Agricultural University Gymnasium

8 September 2008; 9:00	China (CHN)	3-0	Lithuania (LTU)	China Agricultural University Gymnasium
8 September 2008; 9:00	(25–18, 25–17, 25–14)			China Agricultural University Gymnasium

9 September 2008; 12:00	Lithuania (LTU)	3-0	Latvia (LAT)	China Agricultural University Gymnasium
9 September 2008; 12:00	(16–25, 25–16, 25–19, 25–19)			China Agricultural University Gymnasium

5-8th Semifinals

12 September 2008; 17:30	Japan (JPN)	1–3	Lithuania (LTU)	China Agricultural University Gymnasium
12 September 2008; 17:30	(17–25, 25–20, 18–25, 19–25)			China Agricultural University Gymnasium

5th-6th Classification match

13 September 2008; 14:00	Lithuania (LTU)	0–3	Ukraine (UKR)	China Agricultural University Gymnasium
13 September 2008; 14:00	(18–25, 19–25, 19–25)			China Agricultural University Gymnasium

== See also ==
- Lithuania at the Paralympics
- Lithuania at the 2008 Summer Olympics
