= Lithuania at the 2016 Summer Paralympics =

- IPC code: LTU
- NPC: Lithuanian Paralympic Committee
- Website: www.lpok.lt

in Rio de Janeiro
- Competitors: 13 in 5 sports
- Flag bearer: Edgaras Matakas (opening)
- Medals Ranked 44th: Gold 2 Silver 1 Bronze 0 Total 3

Summer Paralympics appearances (overview)
- 1992; 1996; 2000; 2004; 2008; 2012; 2016; 2020; 2024

Other related appearances
- Soviet Union (1988)

Lithuania competed at the 2016 Summer Paralympics in Rio de Janeiro, Brazil, from 7 to 18 September 2016. They won three medals, two golds and one silver.

== Disability classifications ==
Every participant at the Paralympics has their disability grouped into one of five disability categories; amputation, the condition may be congenital or sustained through injury or illness; cerebral palsy; wheelchair athletes, there is often overlap between this and other categories; visual impairment, including blindness; Les autres, any physical disability that does not fall strictly under one of the other categories, for example dwarfism or multiple sclerosis. Each Paralympic sport then has its own classifications, dependent upon the specific physical demands of competition. Events are given a code, made of numbers and letters, describing the type of event and classification of the athletes competing. Some sports, such as athletics, divide athletes by both the category and severity of their disabilities, other sports, for example swimming, group competitors from different categories together, the only separation being based on the severity of the disability.

== Medallists ==
Medal	Name	Sport	Event	Date
Gold	Mindaugas Bilius	Athletics	Men's shot put F37	14 September
Gold	Lithuania men's national goalball team: Mantas Brazauskis; Nerijus Montvydas; Mantas Panovas; Genrik Pavliukianec; Justas Pazarauskas; Mindaugas Suchovejus	Goalball	Men's tournament	16 September
Silver	Mindaugas Bilius	Athletics	Men's discus throw F37	8 September

Medals by sport
Sport	Gold medal	Silver medal	Bronze medal	Total
Athletics	1	1	0	2
Goalball	1	0	0	1
Total	2	1	0	3

== Athletics ==
Athlete	Event	Heat		Final	
Athlete	Event	Result	Rank	Result	Rank
Ramunė Adomaitienė	Women's long jump T38	—N/a		4.52	4
Mindaugas Bilius	Men's discus throw F37	—N/a		53.50	2nd place, silver medalist(s)
Mindaugas Bilius	Men's shot put F37	—N/a		16.80	1st place, gold medalist(s)
Kęstutis Skučas	Men's 100 m T52	21.03	7	Did not advance	
Kęstutis Skučas	Men's discus throw F52	—N/a		17.08	4
Jonas Spudis	Men's javelin throw F44	—N/a		50.79	10

== Goalball ==
Summary

Key:

- ET: After Extra Time
- P – Match decided by penalty-shootout.

Team	Event	Group stage					Quarterfinal	Semifinal	Final / BM	
Team	Event	Opposition Score	Opposition Score	Opposition Score	Opposition Score	Rank	Opposition Score	Opposition Score	Opposition Score	Rank
Lithuania men's	Men's tournament	Finland; W 13–6	United States; W 8–7	China; W 3–1	Turkey; W 5–3	1 Q	Canada; W 5–4	Sweden; W 7–2	United States; W 14–8	1st place, gold medalist(s)

=== Men's tournament ===
Lithuania's men enter the tournament ranked 1st in the world.

Squad

The following is the Lithuania roster in the men's goalball tournament of the 2016 Summer Paralympics.

No.	Player	Class	Date of birth (age)
1	Nerijus Montvydas	B1	21 January 1985 (aged 31)
3	Justas Pazarauskas	B1	15 December 1991 (aged 24)
5	Mantas Brazauskis	B2	15 June 1990 (aged 26)
6	Mantas Panovas	B2	20 August 1989 (aged 27)
7	Genrik Pavliukianec	B1	17 June 1976 (aged 40)
9	Mindaugas Suchovejus	B1	2 April 1988 (aged 28)

Preliminary round

Pos	Team	Pld	W	D	L	GF	GA	GD	Pts	Qualification
1	Lithuania	4	4	0	0	35	22	+13	12	Quarter-finals
2	United States	4	2	0	2	21	18	+3	6	Quarter-finals
3	Turkey	4	2	0	2	20	23	−3	6	Quarter-finals
4	China	4	1	0	3	25	28	−3	3	Quarter-finals
5	Finland	4	1	0	3	24	34	−10	3	

Source: Paralympic.org

8 September 2016; 17:30	Finland	6–13	Lithuania	Future Arena, Rio de Janeiro; Referees: Raquel Aguado (ESP), Rudi Janssen (BEL)
8 September 2016; 17:30	Miinala 3 Mattila 1 Posio 1 Honkanen 1	Report	Pavliukianec 7 Pažarauskas 5 Panovas 1	Future Arena, Rio de Janeiro; Referees: Raquel Aguado (ESP), Rudi Janssen (BEL)

10 September 2016; 13:15	Lithuania	8–7	United States	Future Arena, Rio de Janeiro; Referees: Raquel Aguado (ESP); Patricia Fras (SLO)
10 September 2016; 13:15	Pavliukianec 6 Pazarauskas 2	Report	Hamilton 5 Merren 2	Future Arena, Rio de Janeiro; Referees: Raquel Aguado (ESP); Patricia Fras (SLO)

12 September 2016; 14:15	Lithuania	3–1	China	Future Arena, Rio de Janeiro; Referees: Patricia Fras (SLO), Joelle Boulet (CAN)
12 September 2016; 14:15	Pavliukianec 2 Pazarauskas 1	Report	Chen 1	Future Arena, Rio de Janeiro; Referees: Patricia Fras (SLO), Joelle Boulet (CAN)

13 September 2016; 20:45	Turkey	3–5	Lithuania	Future Arena, Rio de Janeiro; Referees: Nejc Jakic (SLO), Daniel Voltan (BRA)
13 September 2016; 20:45	Karakaya 2 Gündoğdu 1	Report	Panovas 2 Pavliukianec 1 Pazarauskas 1 Montvydas 1	Future Arena, Rio de Janeiro; Referees: Nejc Jakic (SLO), Daniel Voltan (BRA)

Quarterfinal

14 September 2016; 18:00	Lithuania	5–4	Canada	Future Arena, Rio de Janeiro; Referees: Bülent Kimyon (TUR), Alexander Knecht (GER)
14 September 2016; 18:00	Pazarauskas 3 Pavliukianec 2	Report	Ripley 2 Hache 1 Nesbitt 1	Future Arena, Rio de Janeiro; Referees: Bülent Kimyon (TUR), Alexander Knecht (GER)

Semifinal

15 September 2016; 18:30	Lithuania	7–2	Sweden	Future Arena, Rio de Janeiro; Referees: Yoshinori Nii (JPN), Raquel Aguado (ESP)
15 September 2016; 18:30	Pavliukianec 5 Pazarauskas 2	Report	Seremeti 1 Weichel 1	Future Arena, Rio de Janeiro; Referees: Yoshinori Nii (JPN), Raquel Aguado (ESP)

Final

16 September 2016; 20:00	United States	8–14	Lithuania	Future Arena, Rio de Janeiro; Referees: Nejc Jakic (SLO), Daniel Voltan (BRA)
16 September 2016; 20:00	Simpson 4 Hamilton 1 Jenks 1 Merren 1 Walker 1	Report	Pavliukianec 8 Pazarauskas 6	Future Arena, Rio de Janeiro; Referees: Nejc Jakic (SLO), Daniel Voltan (BRA)

== Judo ==
Athlete	Event	Round of 16	Quarterfinals	Semifinals	Repechage	Bronze medal	Final	
Athlete	Event	Opposition Result	Opposition Result	Opposition Result	Opposition Result	Opposition Result	Opposition Result	Rank
Osvaldas Bareikis	Men's 66 kg	Falcon (VEN); W 000–000	Khorava (UKR); L 000–100	Did not advance	Perez Diaz (CUB); W 001–000	Fujimoto (JPN); L 000–000	Did not advance	4

== Rowing ==
Athlete(s)	Event	Heats		Repechage		Final	
Athlete(s)	Event	Time	Rank	Time	Rank	Time	Rank
Augustas Navickas	Men's single sculls	5:10.24	4 R	5:13.07	5 FB	5:10.21	10

Qualification Legend: FA=Final A (medal); FB=Final B (non-medal); R=Repechage

== Swimming ==
Men

Athlete	Event	Heat		Final	
Athlete	Event	Result	Rank	Result	Rank
Edgaras Matakas	50 m freestyle S11	27.86	11	Did not advance	
Edgaras Matakas	100 m freestyle S11	1:06.09	10	Did not advance	
Edgaras Matakas	400 m freestyle S11	—N/a		5:30.66	8

== See also ==
- Lithuania at the 2016 Summer Olympics
