= Lithuania at the 2004 Summer Paralympics =

- IPC code: LTU
- NPC: Lithuanian Paralympic Committee
- Website: www.lpok.lt

in Athens
- Competitors: 19 in 5 sports
- Medals Ranked 50th: Gold 1 Silver 1 Bronze 5 Total 7

Summer Paralympics appearances (overview)
- 1992; 1996; 2000; 2004; 2008; 2012; 2016; 2020; 2024

Other related appearances
- Soviet Union (1988)

Lithuania competed at the 2004 Summer Paralympics in Athens, Greece.

== Medalists ==
| Medal | Name | Sport | Event |
|---|---|---|---|
| Gold | Aldona Grigaliūnienė | Athletics | Women's Shot put F37/38 |
| Silver | Kestutis Skucas | Swimming | Men's 50 m backstroke S4 |
| Bronze | Kęstutis Bartkėnas | Athletics | Men's 10000 metres T13 |
| Bronze | Linas Balsys | Athletics | Men's Marathon T13 |
| Bronze | Rolandas Urbonas | Athletics | Men's Discus throw F12 |
| Bronze | Algirdas Tatulis | Athletics | Men's Discus throw F42 |
| Bronze | Jonas Stoskus | Judo | Men's Middleweight (90 kg) |

== Sports ==
=== Athletics ===
==== Men's track ====
| Athlete | Class | Event | Heats | | Semifinal | | Final | |
| Athlete | Class | Event | Result | Rank | Result | Rank | Result | Rank |
|---|---|---|---|---|---|---|---|---|
| Linas Balsys | T13 | 5000m | —N/a | | | | DNS | |
| Linas Balsys | T13 | 10000m | —N/a | | | | DNF | |
| Linas Balsys | T13 | Marathon | —N/a | | | | 2:43:55 | 3rd place, bronze medalist(s) |
| Kęstutis Bartkėnas | T13 | 5000m | —N/a | | | | 15:47.46 | 4 |
| Kęstutis Bartkėnas | T13 | 10000m | —N/a | | | | 32:05.17 | 3rd place, bronze medalist(s) |
| Kęstutis Bartkėnas | T13 | Marathon | —N/a | | | | DNF | |
| Andrius Kalvelis | T13 | 800m | —N/a | | | | 2:03.47 | 6 |
| Andrius Kalvelis | T13 | 1500m | 4:16.24 | 17 | did not advance | | | |

==== Men's field ====
| Athlete | Class | Event | Final | | |
| Athlete | Class | Event | Result | Points | Rank |
|---|---|---|---|---|---|
| Vytautas Girnius | F11 | Javelin | 39.01 | - | 6 |
| Tomas Kairys | P44 | Pentathlon | 3874 | | 5 |
| Algirdas Tatulis | F42 | Discus | 43.62 | - | 3rd place, bronze medalist(s) |
| Rolandas Urbonas | F13 | Discus | 43.32 | - | 3rd place, bronze medalist(s) |
| Rolandas Urbonas | F13 | Shot put | 14.96 | - | 5 |

==== Women's track ====
| Athlete | Class | Event | Heats | | Semifinal | | Final | |
| Athlete | Class | Event | Result | Rank | Result | Rank | Result | Rank |
|---|---|---|---|---|---|---|---|---|
| Sigita Markevičienė | T11 | 100m | 13.99 | 9 | did not advance | | | |
| Sigita Markevičienė | T11 | 200m | 28.98 | 7 q | 29.80 | 6 B | 28.70 | 2 |

==== Women's field ====
| Athlete | Class | Event | Final | | |
| Athlete | Class | Event | Result | Points | Rank |
|---|---|---|---|---|---|
| Aldona Grigaliūnienė | F35/36/38 | Discus | 21.74 | 850 | 11 |
| Aldona Grigaliūnienė | F37/38 | Shot put | 11.07 WR | 1105 | 1st place, gold medalist(s) |
| Dangute Skeriene | F12 | Shot put | 11.16 | - | 4 |

=== Goalball ===
The men's goalball team didn't win any medals; they were 9th out of 12 teams.

==== Players ====
- Egidijus Biknevicius
- Arvydas Juchna
- Saulius Leonavicius
- Algirdas Montvydas
- Genrik Pavliukianec
- Marius Zibolis

==== Tournament ====
| Game | Match | Score | Rank |
| 1 | Lithuania vs. Spain (ESP) | 1 - 4 | 5 |
| 2 | Lithuania vs. South Korea (KOR) | 5 - 10 | 5 |
| 3 | Lithuania vs. Finland (FIN) | 8 - 4 | 5 |
| 4 | Lithuania vs. Hungary (HUN) | 1 - 6 | 5 |
| 5 | Lithuania vs. Slovenia (SLO) | 7 - 4 | 5 |
| 9/10th classification | Lithuania vs. Germany (GER) | 6 - 4 | 9 |

=== Judo ===
| Athlete | Event | Preliminary | Quarterfinals | Semifinals | Repechage round 1 | Repechage round 2 | Final/ Bronze medal contest |
| Athlete | Event | Opposition Result | Opposition Result | Opposition Result | Opposition Result | Opposition Result | Opposition Result |
|---|---|---|---|---|---|---|---|
| Jonas Stoskus | Men's 90kg | Nine (ALG); L 0011S-0211S | —N/a | | Jones (USA); W 1001–0000 | Miyauchi (JPN); W 1000S-0001 | Park J M (KOR); W 0011C-0010C (bronze) |

=== Powerlifting ===
| Athlete | Event | Result | Rank |
|---|---|---|---|
| Dmitrijus Archipovas | 75kg | 150.0 | 13 |

=== Swimming ===
==== Men ====
| Athlete | Class | Event | Heats | | Final | |
| Athlete | Class | Event | Result | Rank | Result | Rank |
|---|---|---|---|---|---|---|
| Kęstutis Skučas | S4 | 50m freestyle | DNS | | did not advance | |
| Kęstutis Skučas | S4 | 100m freestyle | DNS | | did not advance | |
| Kęstutis Skučas | S4 | 200m freestyle | 3:48.21 | 11 | did not advance | |
| Kęstutis Skučas | S4 | 50m backstroke | 50.41 | 3 Q | 47.62 | 2nd place, silver medalist(s) |
| Kęstutis Skučas | S4 | 50m butterfly | 1:02.31 | 6 Q | 1:00.45 | 5 |
| Kęstutis Skučas | SB3 | 50m breaststroke | 1:06.74 | 10 | did not advance | |
| Kęstutis Skučas | SM4 | 150m individual medley | DNS | | did not advance | |

== See also ==
- Lithuania at the Paralympics
- Lithuania at the 2004 Summer Olympics
