= Lithuania men's national goalball team =

Lithuanian national team, for the Paralympic sport of goalball

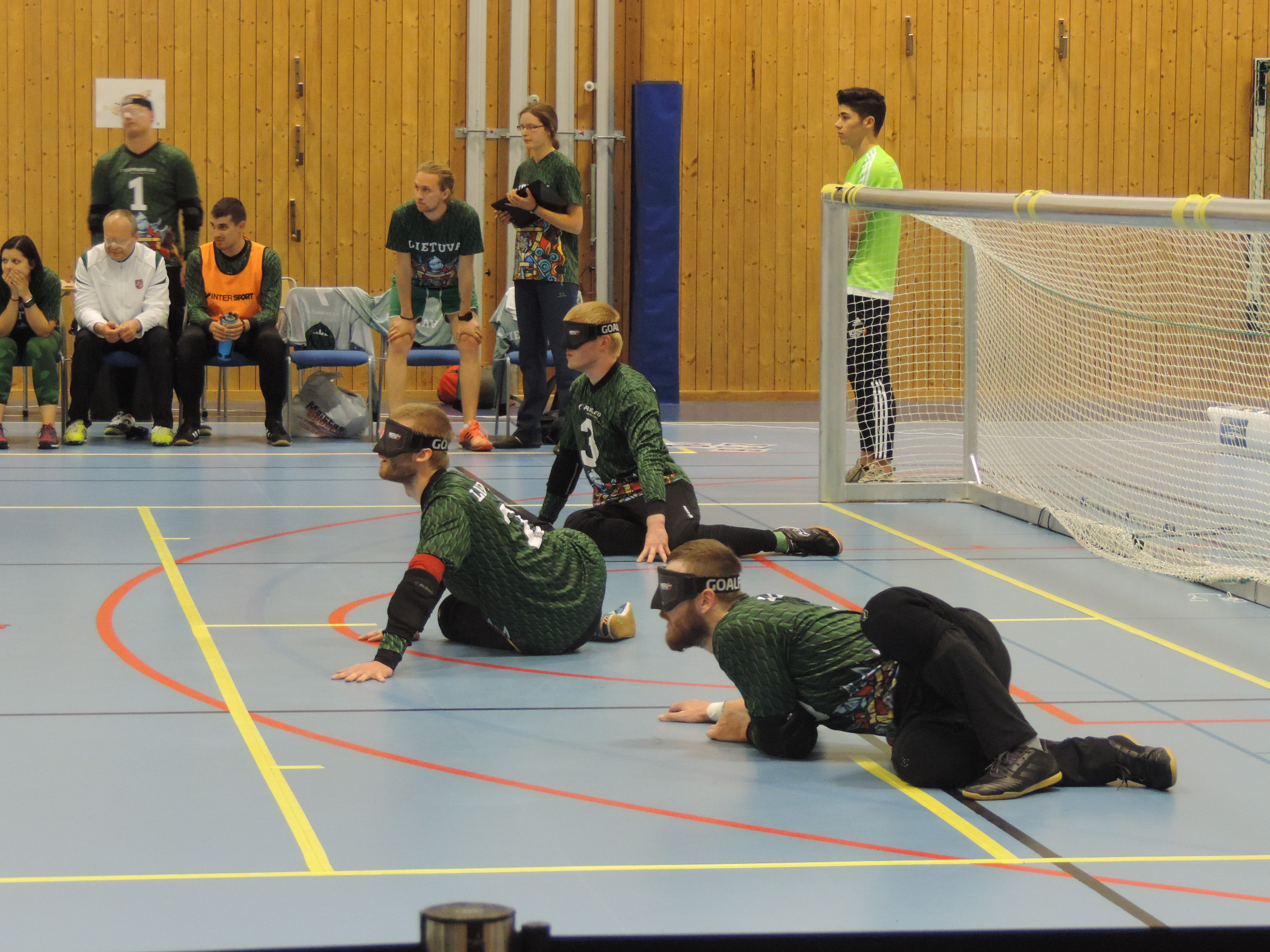
- Lithuania men's goalball team ready to defend against Australia at the Goalball World Championships, Malmö, Sweden (2018).
- Full name: Lietuvos nacionalinė golbolo rinktinė
- Nicknames: Liūtai (Lions)
- Sport: Goalball
- League: IBSA
- Division: Men
- Region: IBSA Europe
- Location: Lithuania
- Colours: Yellow, green
- Championships: Paralympic Games medals: : 1: 2: 1 World Championship medals: : 2: 1: 1
- Parent group: Lithuanian Paralympic Committee
- Website: paralympics.lt

Lithuania men's national goalball team is the men's national team of Lithuania. Goalball is a team sport designed specifically for athletes with a vision impairment. It takes part in international competitions.

Members of the team participate in the several international tournaments each year within the country at the capital Vilnius and the Paralympic training centre nearby at historic Trakai.

== Paralympic Games ==
=== 2000 Sydney ===
The team competed in the 2000 Summer Paralympics, between 18 and 29 October 2000, at an Olympic Park indoor hall, Sydney, New South Wales, Australia. They came second.

=== 2004 Athens ===
The team competed in 2004 Summer Paralympics, between 17 and 28 September 2004, in the Faliro Sports Pavilion Arena, Athens, Greece. They came ninth.

=== 2008 Beijing ===
The team competed in 2008 Summer Paralympics, from 6 to 17 September 2008, in the Beijing Institute of Technology Gymnasium 'bat wing' arena, Beijing, China. There were 12 men's teams and 8 women's teams taking part in this event. They came second.

=== 2012 London ===
The team competed in the 2012 Summer Paralympics from 30 August to 7 September 2012, in the Copper Box Arena, London, England. They came fourth.

The following is the Lithuania roster in the men's goalball tournament of the 2012 Summer Paralympics.

No.	Player	Age
1	Nerijus Montvydas	27
3	Arvydas Juchna	28
5	Saulius Leonavicius	39
6	Mantas Panovas	23
7	Genrik Pavliukianec	36
8	Marius Zibolis	37

Team	Pld	W	D	L	GF	GA	GD	Pts	Qualification
Turkey	5	4	1	0	26	6	+20	13	Quarterfinals
Brazil	5	3	0	2	30	20	+10	9	Quarterfinals
Lithuania	5	2	2	1	33	20	+13	8	Quarterfinals
Finland	5	2	0	3	16	24	−8	6	Quarterfinals
Sweden	5	1	2	2	16	25	−9	5	Eliminated
Great Britain	5	0	1	4	9	35	−26	1	Eliminated

Source: "London 2012 Paralympic Games - Goalball results" (PDF). Paralympic.org. 3 October 2012 – via Goalball.sport.

30 August 2012; 09:00	Lithuania	11 – 1	Great Britain	Copper Box, London; Referees: Bülent Kimyon (TUR), Kimberly Anderson (USA)
30 August 2012; 09:00	Pavliukianec 4 Zibolis 3 Juchna 2 Panovas 2	Report	Sharkey 1	Copper Box, London; Referees: Bülent Kimyon (TUR), Kimberly Anderson (USA)

31 August 2012; 10:15	Lithuania	10 – 0	Finland	Copper Box, London; Referees: Dawna Christy (CAN), Warrick Jackes (AUS)
31 August 2012; 10:15	Pavliukianec 5 Juchna 3 Leonavicius 1 Zibolis 1	Report		Copper Box, London; Referees: Dawna Christy (CAN), Warrick Jackes (AUS)

1 September 2012; 11:30	Brazil	12 – 5	Lithuania	Copper Box, London; Referees: Thomas Baerz (GER), Launel Scott (CAN)
1 September 2012; 11:30	Marques 10; Almeida Maciel Celente 2	Report	Montvydas 2 Pavliuklianec 2 Panovas 1	Copper Box, London; Referees: Thomas Baerz (GER), Launel Scott (CAN)

2 September 2012; 19:45	Sweden	5 – 5	Lithuania	Copper Box, London; Referees: Janne Ahokas (FIN), Hooshang Shariati (IRI)
2 September 2012; 19:45	Seremati 5	Report	Pavliukianec 2 Panovas 2 Juchna 1	Copper Box, London; Referees: Janne Ahokas (FIN), Hooshang Shariati (IRI)

4 September 2012; 19:45	Lithuania	2 – 2	Turkey	Copper Box, London; Referees: Hooshang Shariati (IRI), Dawna Christy (CAN)
4 September 2012; 19:45	Zibolis 2	Report	Alkan 1 Karakaya 1	Copper Box, London; Referees: Hooshang Shariati (IRI), Dawna Christy (CAN)

Quarter-finals

5 September 2012; 18:00	China	4 – 12	Lithuania	Copper Box, London; Referees: Bülent Kimyon (TUR), Carla Da Matta (BRA)
5 September 2012; 18:00	Chen 2 Yongquan 2	Report	Zibolis 6 Juchna 4 Leonavičius 1 Pavliukianec 1	Copper Box, London; Referees: Bülent Kimyon (TUR), Carla Da Matta (BRA)

Semi-finals

6 September 2012; 20:00	Brazil	2 – 1	Lithuania	Copper Box, London; Referees: Janne Ahokas (FIN), Shinji Mizuno (JPN)
6 September 2012; 20:00	Almeida Maciel Celente 1 Marques 1	Report	Leonavičius 1	Copper Box, London; Referees: Janne Ahokas (FIN), Shinji Mizuno (JPN)

Bronze Metal

7 September 2012; 18:30	Lithuania	1 – 4	Turkey	Copper Box, London; Referees: Juha Vuokila (FIN), Yasser Omar (EGY)
7 September 2012; 18:30	Zibolis 1	Report	Karakaya 4	Copper Box, London; Referees: Juha Vuokila (FIN), Yasser Omar (EGY)

=== 2016 Rio de Janeiro ===
The team competed in the 2016 Summer Paralympics, with competition from Thursday 8 September to finals on Friday 16 September 2016, in the temporary Future Arena, Rio de Janeiro, Brazil. They won the gold medal.

The following is the Lithuania roster in the men's goalball tournament of the 2016 Summer Paralympics.

No.	Player	Class	Date of birth (age)
1	Nerijus Montvydas	B1	21 January 1985 (aged 31)
3	Justas Pazarauskas	B1	15 December 1991 (aged 24)
5	Mantas Brazauskis	B2	15 June 1990 (aged 26)
6	Mantas Panovas	B2	20 August 1989 (aged 27)
7	Genrik Pavliukianec	B1	17 June 1976 (aged 40)
9	Mindaugas Suchovejus	B1	2 April 1988 (aged 28)

Pos	Team	Pld	W	D	L	GF	GA	GD	Pts	Qualification
1	Lithuania	4	4	0	0	35	22	+13	12	Quarter-finals
2	United States	4	2	0	2	21	18	+3	6	Quarter-finals
3	Turkey	4	2	0	2	20	23	−3	6	Quarter-finals
4	China	4	1	0	3	25	28	−3	3	Quarter-finals
5	Finland	4	1	0	3	24	34	−10	3	

Source: Paralympic.org

8 September 2016; 17:30	Finland	6–13	Lithuania	Future Arena, Rio de Janeiro; Referees: Raquel Aguado (ESP), Rudi Janssen (BEL)
8 September 2016; 17:30	Miinala 3 Mattila 1 Posio 1 Honkanen 1	Report	Pavliukianec 7 Pažarauskas 5 Panovas 1	Future Arena, Rio de Janeiro; Referees: Raquel Aguado (ESP), Rudi Janssen (BEL)

10 September 2016; 13:15	Lithuania	8–7	United States	Future Arena, Rio de Janeiro; Referees: Raquel Aguado (ESP); Patricia Fras (SLO)
10 September 2016; 13:15	Pavliukianec 6 Pazarauskas 2	Report	Hamilton 5 Merren 2	Future Arena, Rio de Janeiro; Referees: Raquel Aguado (ESP); Patricia Fras (SLO)

12 September 2016; 14:15	Lithuania	3–1	China	Future Arena, Rio de Janeiro; Referees: Patricia Fras (SLO), Joelle Boulet (CAN)
12 September 2016; 14:15	Pavliukianec 2 Pazarauskas 1	Report	Chen 1	Future Arena, Rio de Janeiro; Referees: Patricia Fras (SLO), Joelle Boulet (CAN)

13 September 2016; 20:45	Turkey	3–5	Lithuania	Future Arena, Rio de Janeiro; Referees: Nejc Jakic (SLO), Daniel Voltan (BRA)
13 September 2016; 20:45	Karakaya 2 Gündoğdu 1	Report	Panovas 2 Pavliukianec 1 Pazarauskas 1 Montvydas 1	Future Arena, Rio de Janeiro; Referees: Nejc Jakic (SLO), Daniel Voltan (BRA)

Quarter-finals

14 September 2016; 18:00	Lithuania	5–4	Canada	Future Arena, Rio de Janeiro; Referees: Bülent Kimyon (TUR), Alexander Knecht (GER)
14 September 2016; 18:00	Pazarauskas 3 Pavliukianec 2	Report	Ripley 2 Hache 1 Nesbitt 1	Future Arena, Rio de Janeiro; Referees: Bülent Kimyon (TUR), Alexander Knecht (GER)

Semi-finals

15 September 2016; 18:30	Lithuania	7–2	Sweden	Future Arena, Rio de Janeiro; Referees: Yoshinori Nii (JPN), Raquel Aguado (ESP)
15 September 2016; 18:30	Pavliukianec 5 Pazarauskas 2	Report	Seremeti 1 Weichel 1	Future Arena, Rio de Janeiro; Referees: Yoshinori Nii (JPN), Raquel Aguado (ESP)

Finals

16 September 2016; 20:00	United States	8–14	Lithuania	Future Arena, Rio de Janeiro; Referees: Nejc Jakic (SLO), Daniel Voltan (BRA)
16 September 2016; 20:00	Simpson 4 Hamilton 1 Jenks 1 Merren 1 Walker 1	Report	Pavliukianec 8 Pazarauskas 6	Future Arena, Rio de Janeiro; Referees: Nejc Jakic (SLO), Daniel Voltan (BRA)

=== 2020 Tokyo ===
The team competed in the 2020 Summer Paralympics, with competition from Wednesday 25 August to finals on Friday 3 September 2021, in the Makuhari Messe arena, Chiba, Tokyo, Japan. They qualified at the 2019 IBSA Goalball Paralympic Ranking Tournament at Fort Wayne, Indiana, United States of America.

The team finished as bronze medalists, behind China, and Brazil.

The following is the Lithuania roster in the men's goalball tournament of the 2020 Summer Paralympics.

No.	Player	Class	Date of birth (age)
1	Nerijus Montvydas	B1	21 January 1985 (aged 36)
2	Artūras Jonikaitis	B3	21 December 1986 (aged 34)
3	Justas Pažarauskas	B1	15 December 1991 (aged 29)
5	Mantas Brazauskis	B2	15 June 1990 (aged 31)
7	Genrik Pavliukianec	B1	17 June 1976 (aged 45)
9	Marius Zibolis	B1	14 October 1974 (aged 46)

Coach was Valdas Gecevicius, and staff member Ugnius Savickas. Jerseys were predominantly green or white.

Pos	Team	Pld	W	D	L	GF	GA	GD	Pts	Qualification
1	Japan (H)	4	3	0	1	37	15	+22	9	Quarter-finals
2	Brazil	4	3	0	1	35	17	+18	9	Quarter-finals
3	United States	4	2	0	2	25	35	−10	6	Quarter-finals
4	Lithuania	4	1	1	2	24	31	−7	4	Quarter-finals
5	Algeria	4	0	1	3	20	43	−23	1	

Source: TOCOG
(H) Hosts

Round-robin

25 August 2021; 09:00	Brazil	11–2	Lithuania	Makuhari Messe, Tokyo; Referees: Robert Avery (Great Britain), Warrick Jackes (Australia)
25 August 2021; 09:00	Marques 4 Moreno 3 Sousa 3 Da Silva 1	Report	Pavliukianec 1 Zibolis 1	Makuhari Messe, Tokyo; Referees: Robert Avery (Great Britain), Warrick Jackes (Australia)

26 August 2021; 19:00	Lithuania	7–7	Algeria	Makuhari Messe, Tokyo; Referees: Warrick Jackes (Australia), Svitlana Moroz (Ukraine)
26 August 2021; 19:00	Pavliukianec 3 Pazarauskas 3 Zibolis 1	Report	Belhouchat 7	Makuhari Messe, Tokyo; Referees: Warrick Jackes (Australia), Svitlana Moroz (Ukraine)

28 August 2021; 14:45	Lithuania	2–10	Japan	Makuhari Messe, Tokyo; Referees: Warrick Jackes (Australia), Bas Spaans (Netherlands)
28 August 2021; 14:45	Montvydas 1 Pavliukianec 1	Report	Sano 4 Miyajiki 3 Kaneko 2 Yamaguchi 1	Makuhari Messe, Tokyo; Referees: Warrick Jackes (Australia), Bas Spaans (Netherlands)

30 August 2021; 13:15	United States	3–13	Lithuania	Makuhari Messe, Tokyo; Referees: Robert Avery (Great Britain), Bas Spaans (Netherlands)
30 August 2021; 13:15	Simpson 2 Young 1	Report	Montvydas 5 Zibolis 4 Pavliukianec 2 Pazarauskas 2	Makuhari Messe, Tokyo; Referees: Robert Avery (Great Britain), Bas Spaans (Netherlands)

Quarter-finals

31 August 2021; 17:45	Belgium	4–7	Lithuania	Makuhari Messe, Tokyo; Referees: Bas Spaans (Netherlands), Raili Sipura (FIN)
31 August 2021; 17:45	T. Vanhove 3 Amnir 1	Report	Pavliukianec 4 Montvydas 2 Pazarauskas 1	Makuhari Messe, Tokyo; Referees: Bas Spaans (Netherlands), Raili Sipura (FIN)

Semi-finals

2 September 2021; 17:45	Lithuania	5–9	Brazil	Makuhari Messe, Tokyo; Referees: Yoshinori Nii (Japan), Warrick Jackes (Australia)
2 September 2021; 17:45	Pavliukianec 2 Jonikaitis 1 Pažarauskas 1 Zibolis 1	Report	Sousa 6 Moreno 2 Marques 1	Makuhari Messe, Tokyo; Referees: Yoshinori Nii (Japan), Warrick Jackes (Australia)

Bronze Medal

3 September 2021; 15:00	United States	7–10	Lithuania	Makuhari Messe, Tokyo; Referees: Robert Avery (Great Britain), Warrick Jackes (Australia)
3 September 2021; 15:00	Simpson 2 Walker 2 Young 2 Kusku 1	Report	Zibolis 4 Pavliukianec 3 Montvydas 2 Pažarauskas 1	Makuhari Messe, Tokyo; Referees: Robert Avery (Great Britain), Warrick Jackes (Australia)

== World Championships ==
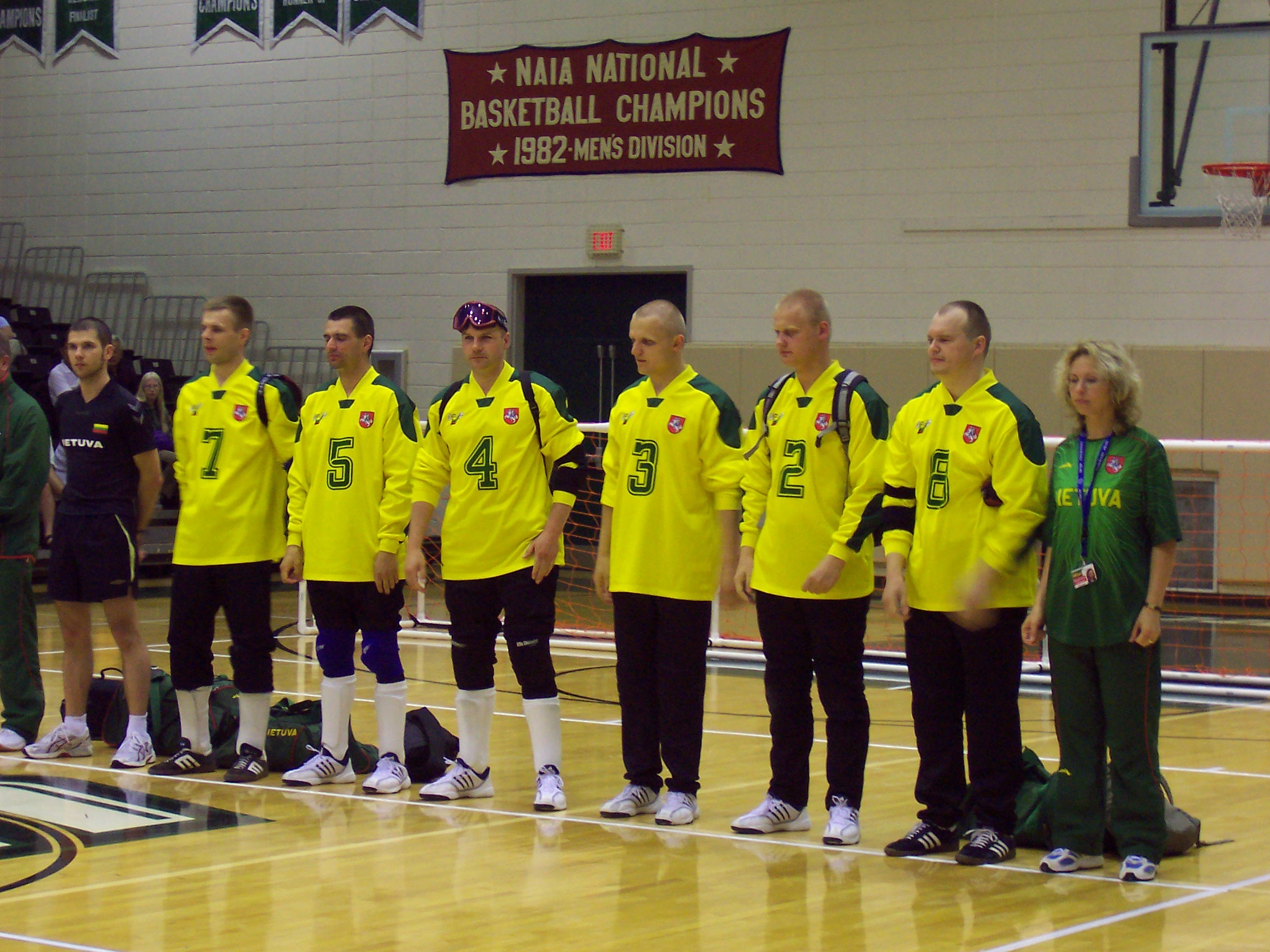
Lithuania men's goalball team. Goalball World Championships, Spartanburg, South Carolina, USA (July 2006).

=== 1998 Madrid ===
The team competed in the 1998 World Championships, in Madrid, Spain.

=== 2002 Rio de Janeiro ===
The team competed in the 2002 World Championships, in Rio de Janeiro, Brazil, from 30 August 2002 to 8 September 2002.

=== 2006 Spartanburg ===
The team competed in the 2006 World Championships, in July 2006, in Spartanburg, South Carolina, United States of America.

=== 2010 Sheffield ===
The team competed in the 2010 World Championships, from 20 to 25 June 2010, in Sheffield, England. They were in Pool B.

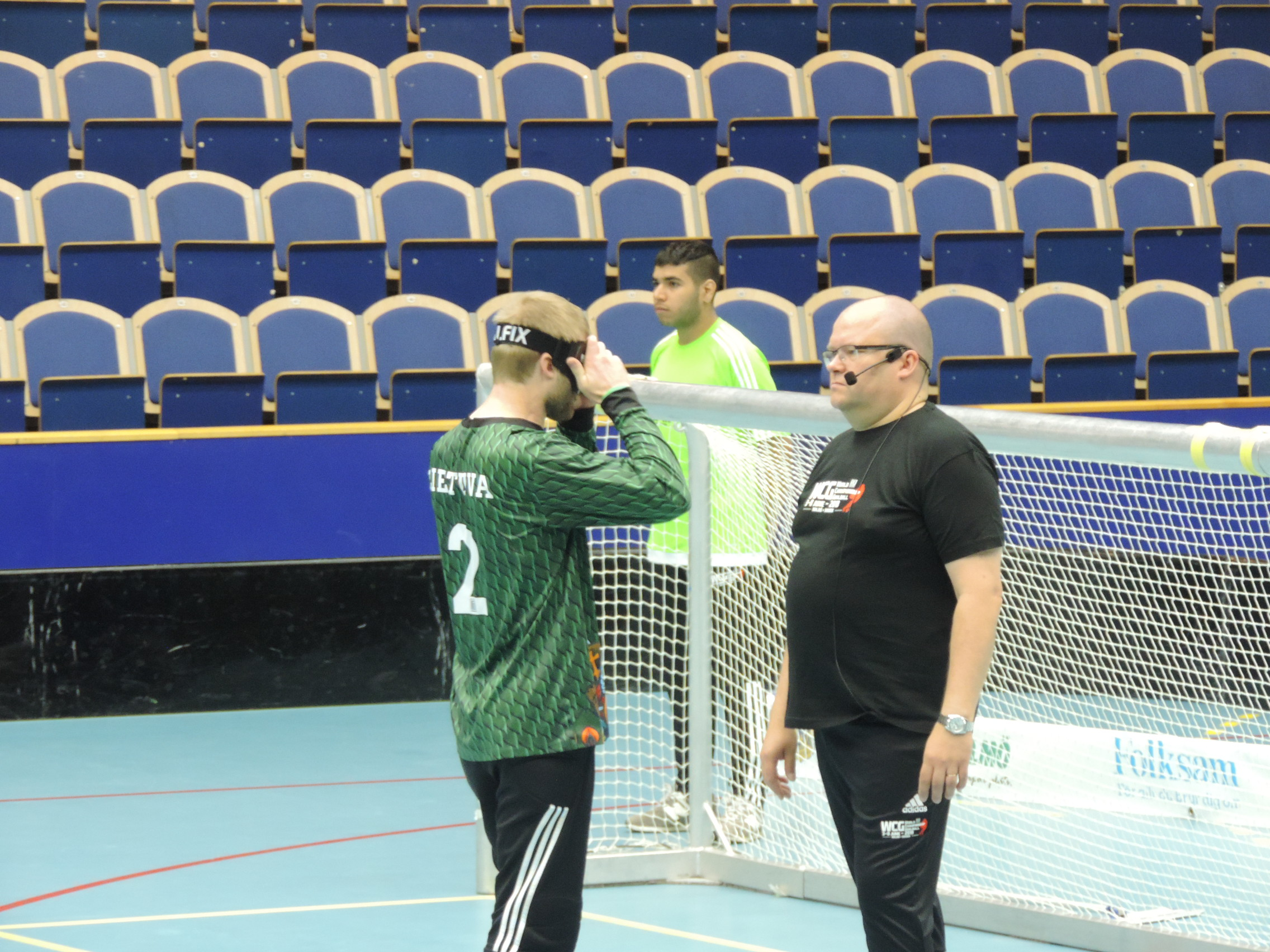
Lithuania men's goalball team. Goalball World Championships, Malmö, Sweden (2018).

=== 2014 Espoo ===
The team competed in the 2014 World Championships from 30 June to 5 July 2014, in Espoo, Finland. They were in Pool B, won their quarter-finals defeating the Czech Republic 11:6, but were mercied by Brazil 14:0 in the semi-finals. In the bronze medal match, they were defeated by the United States, 2:4.

Athletes: Mantas Brazauskis (#4), Saulius Leonavicius (#5), Montvydas Nerijus (#1), Mantas Panovas (#6), Genrik Pavliukianec (#7), and Marius Zibolis (#8).

=== 2018 Malmö ===
The team competed in the 2018 World Championships from 3 to 8 June 2018, at the Baltiska Hallen, Malmö, Sweden. They placed second in Pool A winning six of their seven games, beating the United States 7:4 in the quarter-finals, before being beaten by Brazil in the semi-finals 6:7. For the third place playoffs, they were beaten by Belgium 2:9. The team was fourth in final standings.

Athletes included: Arturas Jonikaitis (centre).

=== 2022 Matosinhos ===
The team competed in the 2022 World Championships from 7 to 16 December 2022, at the Centro de Desportos e Congressos de Matosinhos, Portugal. There were sixteen men's and sixteen women's teams. They placed second in Pool D, and fourth in final standings.

== IBSA World Games ==
=== 2015 Seoul ===
The team competed in the 2015 IBSA World Games from 10 to 17 May 2015, in Seoul, South Korea. Beating China 10:3, the team took the gold medal.

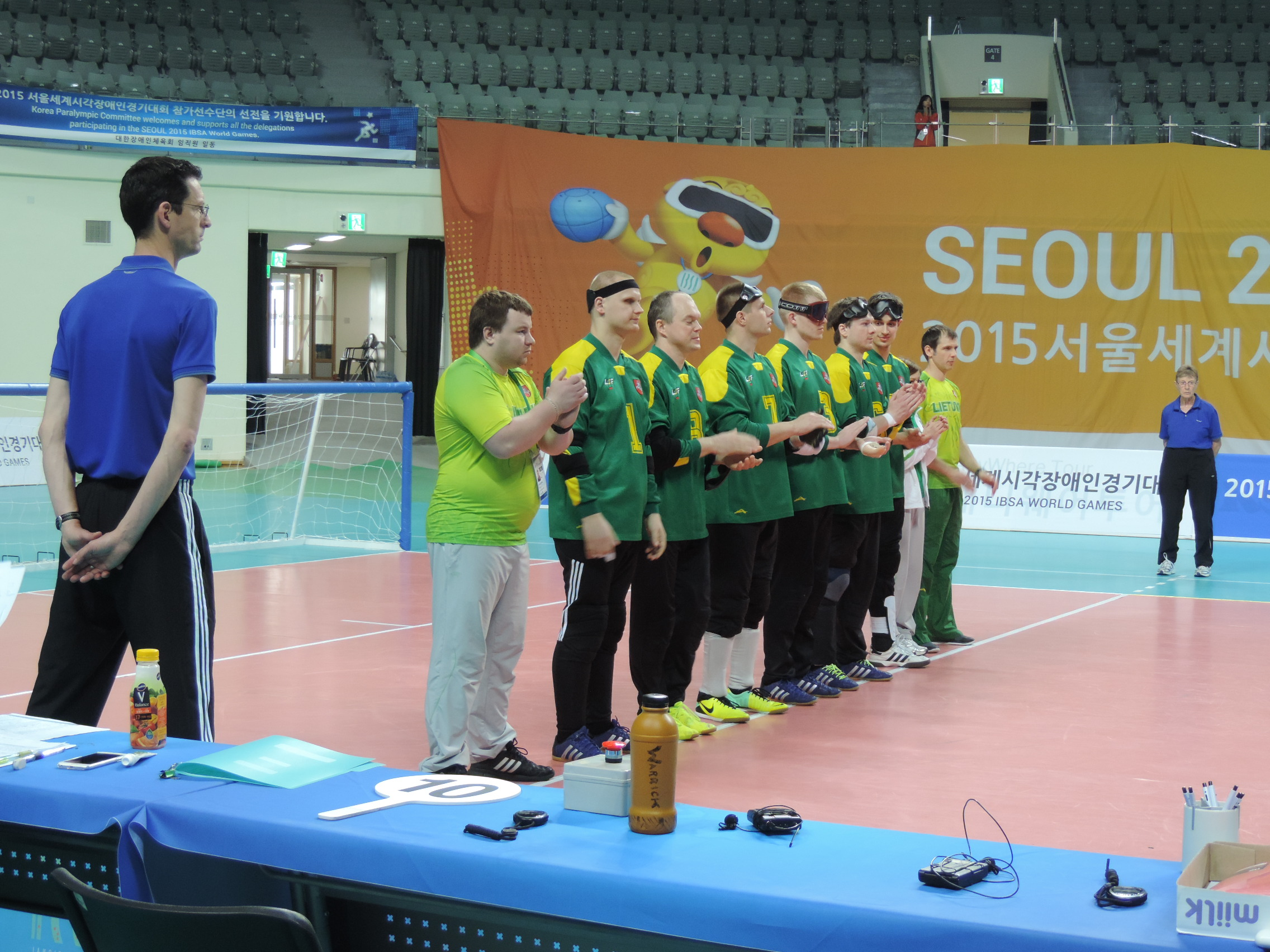
Lithuania line-up in a game with Australia (May 2015).

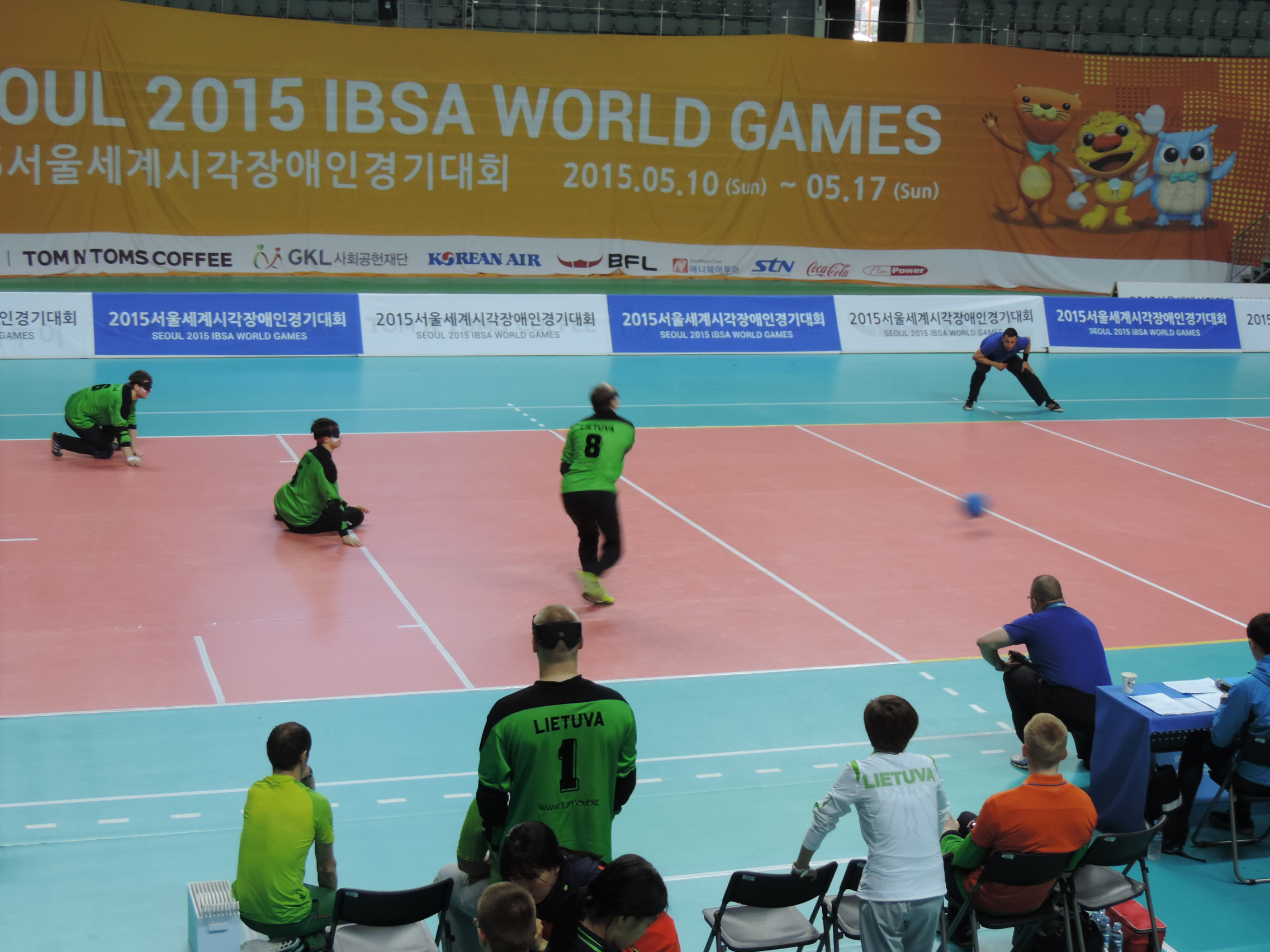
Lithuania throwing towards Japan (May 2015).

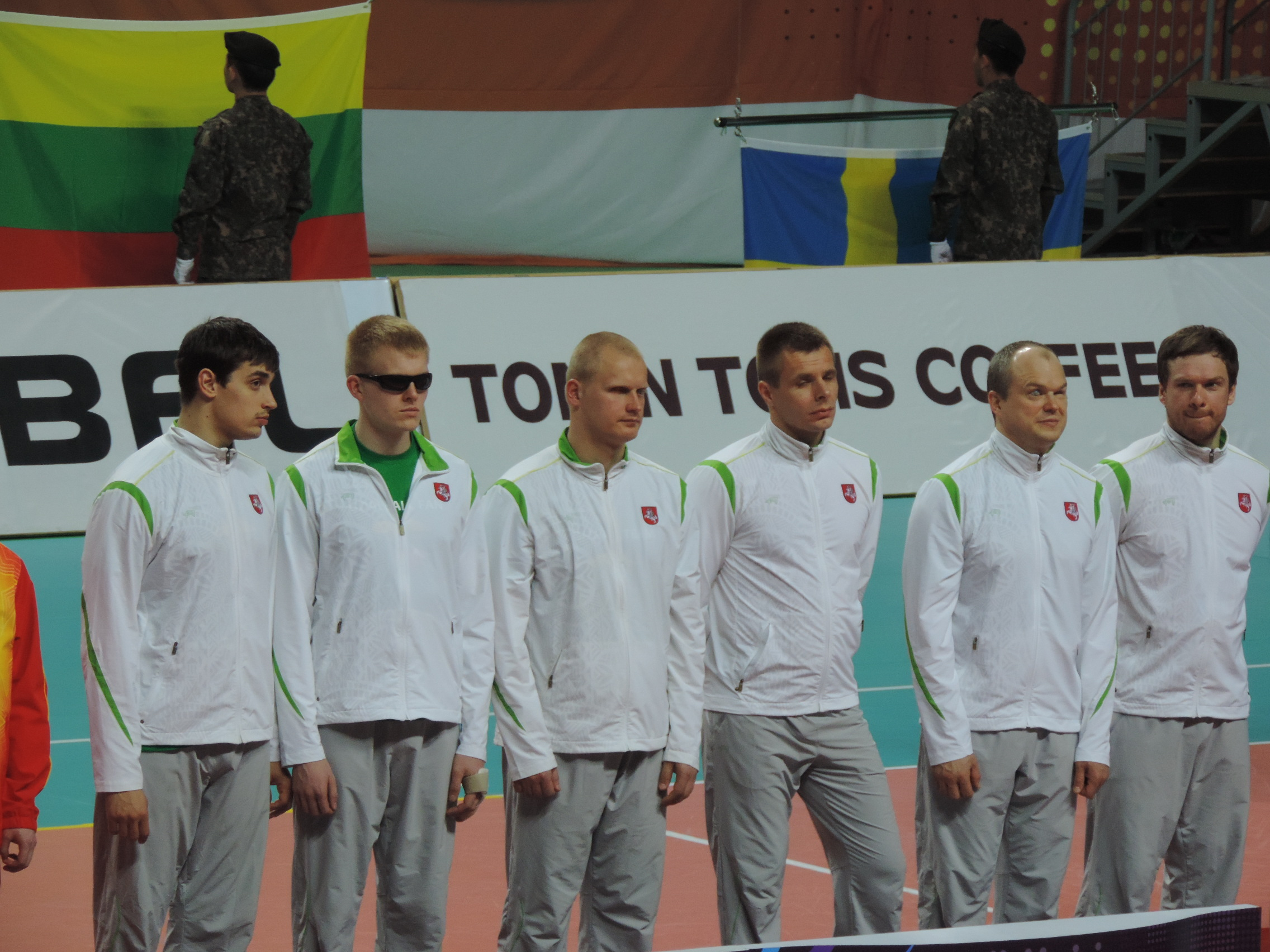
Awaiting medal presentation (May 2015).

== Regional championships ==
The team competes in the IBSA Europe goalball region. Groups A and C are held one year, and Group B the following year. Strong teams move towards Group A.

=== 2013 Konya (Group A) ===
The team competed in the 2013 IBSA Goalball European Championships, Group A, from 1 to 11 November 2013, at Konya, Turkey. They beat Finland in the quarter-finals, 9:5, mercied Germany in the semi-finals 13:3, going onto beat Spain in the finals, 4:2.

=== 2015 Kaunas (Group A) ===
The team competed in the 2015 IBSA Goalball European A Championships, from 5 to 12 July 2015, in Kaunas, Lithuania. The tournament was organised by the Lithuanian Blind Sports Federation. Beating Ukraine 13:8 in the quarter-finals, they went on to lose to Finland 5:13. They mercied Czech Republic 15:5, to take third place.

=== 2017 Pajulahti (Group A) ===
The team competed in the 2017 IBSA Goalball European A Championships from 15 to 23 September 2017, at Pajulahti, Nastola, Finland. They placed first, beating Germany 6:3.

Athletes included: Nerijus Montvydas, Justas Pazarauskas (highest goalscorer of the tournament), Mindaugas Suchojevus, and Marius Zibolis.

=== 2019 Rostock (Group A) ===
The team competed in the 2019 IBSA Goalball European A Championships from 5 to 14 October 2019, in Rostock, Germany. They placed third in the final standings.

Athletes included: Arturas Jonikaitis (centre), Nerijus Montvydas, Mantas Panovas, Justas Pazarauskas, and Marius Zibolis.

== See also ==
- Disabled sports
- Lithuania at the Paralympics
