= Goalball at the 2016 Summer Paralympics – Men's team rosters =

This article shows the rosters of all participating teams at the men's goalball tournament at the 2016 Summer Paralympics in Rio de Janeiro.

== Group A ==
=== Algeria ===
The following is the Algeria roster in the men's goalball tournament of the 2016 Summer Paralympics.

No.	Player	Class	Date of birth (age)
1	Samir Belhouchat	B2	20 October 1974 (aged 41)
2	Ishak Boutaleb	B1	23 April 1987 (aged 29)
3	Imad Eddine Godmane	B1	23 March 1991 (aged 25)
4	Abdelhalim Larbi	B1	26 May 1984 (aged 32)
5	Mohamed Mokrane	B2	9 October 1974 (aged 41)
6	Djilali Chenaoui	B3	20 May 1992 (aged 24)

=== Brazil ===
The following is the Brazil roster in the men's goalball tournament of the 2016 Summer Paralympics.

No.	Player	Class	Date of birth (age)
1	José Roberto Oliveira	B1	2 April 1981 (aged 35)
2	Alex de Melo	B2	10 December 1994 (aged 21)
3	Alexsander Celente	B1	21 December 1980 (aged 35)
4	Leomon Moreno	B1	21 August 1993 (aged 23)
5	Josemarcio Sousa	B3	8 September 1995 (aged 21)
6	Romário Marques	B1	20 July 1989 (aged 27)

=== Canada ===
The following is the Canada roster in the men's goalball tournament of the 2016 Summer Paralympics.

No.	Player	Class	Date of birth (age)
1	Ahmad Zeivdavi	B1	September 3, 1985 (aged 31)
3	Brendan Gaulin	B3	July 13, 1989 (aged 27)
5	Bruno Hache	B2	July 13, 1977 (aged 39)
6	Blair Nesbitt	B3	November 24, 1992 (aged 23)
7	Doug Ripley	B3	November 15, 1973 (aged 42)
8	Simon Richard	B3	May 12, 1994 (aged 22)

=== Germany ===
The following is the Germany roster in the men's goalball tournament of the 2016 Summer Paralympics.

No.	Player	Class	Date of birth (age)
1	Michael Feistle	B2	13 October 1992 (aged 23)
3	Thomas Steiger	B2	31 July 1996 (aged 20)
4	Christian Friebel	B2	17 March 1989 (aged 27)
5	Stefan Hawranke	B2	1 January 1985 (aged 31)
6	Oliver Horauf	B2	13 November 1996 (aged 19)
7	Reno Tiede	B2	16 March 1990 (aged 26)

=== Sweden ===
The following is the Sweden roster in the men's goalball tournament of the 2016 Summer Paralympics.

No.	Player	Class	Date of birth (age)
1	Fatmir Seremeti	B2	10 April 1983 (aged 33)
3	Stefan Gahne	B2	15 January 1982 (aged 34)
4	Nils Posse	B2	28 October 1997 (aged 18)
5	Jimmy Björkstrand	B3	4 May 1979 (aged 37)
7	Mikael Åkerberg	B3	1 July 1982 (aged 34)
8	Peter Weichel	B3	23 December 1982 (aged 33)

== Group B ==
=== China ===
The following is the China roster in the men's goalball tournament of the 2016 Summer Paralympics.

No.	Player	Class	Date of birth (age)
1	Shao Shuai	B1	7 January 1987 (aged 29)
2	Cai Changgui	B1	15 April 1983 (aged 33)
3	Yang Mingyuan	B2	13 January 1998 (aged 18)
4	Chen Liangliang	B1	28 September 1984 (aged 31)
5	Hu Mingyao	B2	14 January 1995 (aged 21)
6	Yu Qinquan	B1	19 April 1996 (aged 20)

=== Finland ===
The following is the Finland roster in the men's goalball tournament of the 2016 Summer Paralympics.

No.	Player	Class	Date of birth (age)
1	Jarno Mattila	B2	1 January 1985 (aged 31)
2	Ville Montonen	B2	27 April 1986 (aged 30)
4	Erkki Miinala	B1	19 August 1986 (aged 30)
6	Markus Tihumäki	B1	29 January 1994 (aged 22)
8	Miika Honkanen	B2	21 July 1989 (aged 27)
9	Petri Posio	B2	17 May 1983 (aged 33)

=== Lithuania ===
The following is the Lithuania roster in the men's goalball tournament of the 2016 Summer Paralympics.

No.	Player	Class	Date of birth (age)
1	Nerijus Montvydas	B1	21 January 1985 (aged 31)
3	Justas Pazarauskas	B1	15 December 1991 (aged 24)
5	Mantas Brazauskis	B2	15 June 1990 (aged 26)
6	Mantas Panovas	B2	20 August 1989 (aged 27)
7	Genrik Pavliukianec	B1	17 June 1976 (aged 40)
9	Mindaugas Suchovejus	B1	2 April 1988 (aged 28)

=== Turkey ===
The following is the Turkey roster in the men's goalball tournament of the 2016 Summer Paralympics.

No.	Player	Class	Date of birth (age)
1	Hüseyin Alkan	B1	1 April 1988 (aged 28)
3	Sercan Kaya	B1	1 June 1991 (aged 25)
4	Ekrem Gündoğdu	B1	26 October 1990 (aged 25)
5	Abdullah Aydoğdu	B3	27 September 1991 (aged 24)
6	Yunus Emre Akyüz	B2	3 May 1993 (aged 23)
7	Tuncay Karakaya	B1	1 October 1989 (aged 26)

=== United States ===
The following is the United States roster in the men's goalball tournament of the 2016 Summer Paralympics.

No.	Player	Class	Date of birth (age)
1	Andy Jenks	B3	September 21, 1990 (aged 25)
2	Tyler Merren	B2	May 29, 1984 (aged 32)
3	Daryl Walker	B2	December 29, 1981 (aged 34)
4	John Kusku	B2	August 6, 1984 (aged 32)
5	Joseph Hamilton	B1	September 6, 1978 (aged 38)
7	Matt Simpson	B1	March 30, 1990 (aged 26)

== See also ==
- Goalball at the 2016 Summer Paralympics – Women's team rosters
