= Lithuania at the 2020 Summer Paralympics =

- IPC code: LTU
- NPC: Lithuanian Paralympic Committee

in Tokyo, Japan August 25, 2020 – September 6, 2020
- Competitors: 11 in 4 sports
- Medals: Gold 0 Silver 0 Bronze 3 Total 3

Summer Paralympics appearances (overview)
- 1992; 1996; 2000; 2004; 2008; 2012; 2016; 2020; 2024

Other related appearances
- Soviet Union (1988)

Lithuania competed at the 2020 Summer Paralympics in Tokyo, Japan.

== Medalists ==
| Medal | Name | Sport | Event | Date |
|---|---|---|---|---|
| Bronze | Edgaras Matakas | Swimming | Men's 50 metre freestyle S11 | 27 August |
| Bronze | Osvaldas Bareikis | Judo | Men's 73 kg | 28 August |
| Bronze | Lithuania men's national goalball team: Nerijus Montvydas; Artūras Jonikaitis; Justas Pažarauskas; Mantas Brazauskis; Genrik Pavliukianec; Marius Zibolis | Goalball | Men's tournament | 3 September |

== Athletics ==
Men's field

| Athlete | Event | Final | |
| Athlete | Event | Result | Rank |
|---|---|---|---|
| Donatas Dundzys | Discus throw F37 | 44.98 | 7 |
| Donatas Dundzys | Shot put F37 | 13.86 | 6 |
| Andrius Skuja | Javelin throw F46 | 45.09 | 9 |
| Andrius Skuja | Shot put F46 | 14.76 | 7 |

Women's field

| Athlete | Event | Final | |
| Athlete | Event | Result | Rank |
|---|---|---|---|
| Oksana Dobrovolskaya | Discus throw F11 | 29.50 | 8 |

== Goalball ==
The following is the Lithuania roster in the men's goalball tournament of the 2020 Summer Paralympics.

| No. | Player | Class | Date of birth (age) |
|---|---|---|---|
| 1 | Nerijus Montvydas | B1 | 21 January 1985 (aged 36) |
| 2 | Artūras Jonikaitis | B3 | 21 December 1986 (aged 34) |
| 3 | Justas Pažarauskas | B1 | 15 December 1991 (aged 29) |
| 5 | Mantas Brazauskis | B2 | 15 June 1990 (aged 31) |
| 7 | Genrik Pavliukianec | B1 | 17 June 1976 (aged 45) |
| 9 | Marius Zibolis | B1 | 14 October 1974 (aged 46) |

Group stage

| Pos | Team | Pld | W | D | L | GF | GA | GD | Pts | Qualification |
|---|---|---|---|---|---|---|---|---|---|---|
| 1 | Japan (H) | 4 | 3 | 0 | 1 | 37 | 15 | +22 | 9 | Quarter-finals |
| 2 | Brazil | 4 | 3 | 0 | 1 | 35 | 17 | +18 | 9 | Quarter-finals |
| 3 | United States | 4 | 2 | 0 | 2 | 25 | 35 | −10 | 6 | Quarter-finals |
| 4 | Lithuania | 4 | 1 | 1 | 2 | 24 | 31 | −7 | 4 | Quarter-finals |
| 5 | Algeria | 4 | 0 | 1 | 3 | 20 | 43 | −23 | 1 | |

Source: TOCOG
(H) Hosts

| 25 August 2021; 09:00 | Brazil | 11–2 | Lithuania | Makuhari Messe, Tokyo; Referees: Robert Avery (Great Britain), Warrick Jackes (Australia) |
| 25 August 2021; 09:00 | Marques 4 Moreno 3 Sousa 3 Da Silva 1 | Report | Pavliukianec 1 Zibolis 1 | Makuhari Messe, Tokyo; Referees: Robert Avery (Great Britain), Warrick Jackes (Australia) |

| 26 August 2021; 19:00 | Lithuania | 7–7 | Algeria | Makuhari Messe, Tokyo; Referees: Warrick Jackes (Australia), Svitlana Moroz (Ukraine) |
| 26 August 2021; 19:00 | Pavliukianec 3 Pazarauskas 3 Zibolis 1 | Report | Belhouchat 7 | Makuhari Messe, Tokyo; Referees: Warrick Jackes (Australia), Svitlana Moroz (Ukraine) |

| 28 August 2021; 14:45 | Lithuania | 2–10 | Japan | Makuhari Messe, Tokyo; Referees: Warrick Jackes (Australia), Bas Spaans (Netherlands) |
| 28 August 2021; 14:45 | Montvydas 1 Pavliukianec 1 | Report | Sano 4 Miyajiki 3 Kaneko 2 Yamaguchi 1 | Makuhari Messe, Tokyo; Referees: Warrick Jackes (Australia), Bas Spaans (Netherlands) |

| 30 August 2021; 13:15 | United States | 3–13 | Lithuania | Makuhari Messe, Tokyo; Referees: Robert Avery (Great Britain), Bas Spaans (Netherlands) |
| 30 August 2021; 13:15 | Simpson 2 Young 1 | Report | Montvydas 5 Zibolis 4 Pavliukianec 2 Pazarauskas 2 | Makuhari Messe, Tokyo; Referees: Robert Avery (Great Britain), Bas Spaans (Netherlands) |

== Judo ==
Lithuania have qualified one judoka.

== Swimming ==
One Lithuanian swimmer has successfully entered the paralympic slot after breaking the MQS.

Men's events

| Athlete | Events | Heats | | Final | |
| Athlete | Events | Time | Rank | Time | Rank |
|---|---|---|---|---|---|
| Edgaras Matakas | 50 metre freestyle S11 | 26.16 | 1 Q | 26.38 | 3rd place, bronze medalist(s) |
| Edgaras Matakas | 100 m breaststroke SB11 | 1:17.41 | 4 Q | 1:16.27 | 5 |

== See also ==
- Lithuania at the Paralympics
- Lithuania at the 2020 Summer Olympics
