= Lithuania at the 1996 Summer Paralympics =

- IPC code: LTU
- NPC: Lithuanian Paralympic Committee
- Website: www.lpok.lt

in Atlanta
- Medals Ranked 34th: Gold 3 Silver 2 Bronze 6 Total 11

Summer Paralympics appearances (overview)
- 1992; 1996; 2000; 2004; 2008; 2012; 2016; 2020; 2024

Other related appearances
- Soviet Union (1988)

Lithuania competed at the 1996 Summer Paralympics in Atlanta, United States.

== Medalists ==
Medal	Name	Sport	Event
Gold	Aldona Grigaliūnienė	Athletics	Women's Long jump F34-37
Gold	Malda Baumgartė	Athletics	Women's Discus throw F41
Gold	Malda Baumgartė	Athletics	Women's Shot put F41
Silver	Kęstutis Bartkėnas	Athletics	Men's 5000 m T11
Silver	Vytautas Girnius	Athletics	Men's Javelin throw F10
Bronze	Saulius Leonavičius	Athletics	Men's 1500 m T11
Bronze	Kęstutis Bartkėnas	Athletics	Men's 10000 m T11
Bronze	Rolandas Urbonas	Athletics	Men's Shot put F12
Bronze	Sigita Markevičienė	Athletics	Women's 800 m T10-11
Bronze	Sigita Markevičienė	Athletics	Women's 1500 m T10-11
Bronze	Jonas Stoskus	Judo	Men's 78 kg

== See also ==
- Lithuania at the 1996 Summer Olympics
