= Lithuania at the 2012 Summer Paralympics =

- IPC code: LTU
- NPC: Lithuanian Paralympic Committee
- Website: www.lpok.lt

in London
- Competitors: 11 in 3 sports
- Medals: Gold 0 Silver 0 Bronze 0 Total 0

Summer Paralympics appearances (overview)
- 1992; 1996; 2000; 2004; 2008; 2012; 2016; 2020; 2024

Other related appearances
- Soviet Union (1988)

Lithuania competed at the 2012 Summer Paralympics in London, United Kingdom, from 29 August to 9 September 2012.

== Athletics ==
Men's field events

Athlete	Event	Distance	Points	Rank
Mindaugas Bilius	Shot put F37-38	15.16	—	6
Mindaugas Bilius	Discus throw F37-38	43.29	909	9
Rolandas Urbonas	Shot put F11-12	12.14	810	10

Women's field events

Athlete	Event	Distance	Points	Rank
Ramunė Adomaitienė	Long jump F37-38	4.67	—	4
Irena Perminienė	Shot put F54-56	6.14	876	8

== Goalball ==
Lithuania qualified a men's team of 6 players.

=== Men's tournament ===
Roster

- Saulius Leonavičius
- Genrikas Pavliukianecas
- Marius Zibolis
- Arvydas Juchna
- Nerijus Montvydas
- Mantas Panovas

Group A

Team	Pld	W	D	L	GF	GA	GD	Pts	Qualification
Turkey	5	4	1	0	26	6	+20	13	Quarterfinals
Brazil	5	3	0	2	30	20	+10	9	Quarterfinals
Lithuania	5	2	2	1	33	20	+13	8	Quarterfinals
Finland	5	2	0	3	16	24	−8	6	Quarterfinals
Sweden	5	1	2	2	16	25	−9	5	Eliminated
Great Britain	5	0	1	4	9	35	−26	1	Eliminated

Source: "London 2012 Paralympic Games - Goalball results" (PDF). Paralympic.org. 2012-10-03 – via Goalball.sport.

30 August 2012; 09:00	Lithuania	11 – 1	Great Britain	Copper Box, London; Referees: Bülent Kimyon (TUR), Kimberly Anderson (USA)
30 August 2012; 09:00	Pavliukianec 4 Zibolis 3 Juchna 2 Panovas 2	Report	Sharkey 1	Copper Box, London; Referees: Bülent Kimyon (TUR), Kimberly Anderson (USA)

31 August 2012; 10:15	Lithuania	10 – 0	Finland	Copper Box, London; Referees: Dawna Christy (CAN), Warrick Jackes (AUS)
31 August 2012; 10:15	Pavliukianec 5 Juchna 3 Leonavicius 1 Zibolis 1	Report		Copper Box, London; Referees: Dawna Christy (CAN), Warrick Jackes (AUS)

1 September 2012; 11:30	Brazil	12 – 5	Lithuania	Copper Box, London; Referees: Thomas Baerz (GER), Launel Scott (CAN)
1 September 2012; 11:30	Marques 10; Almeida Maciel Celente 2	Report	Montvydas 2 Pavliuklianec 2 Panovas 1	Copper Box, London; Referees: Thomas Baerz (GER), Launel Scott (CAN)

2 September 2012; 19:45	Sweden	5 – 5	Lithuania	Copper Box, London; Referees: Janne Ahokas (FIN), Hooshang Shariati (IRI)
2 September 2012; 19:45	Seremati 5	Report	Pavliukianec 2 Panovas 2 Juchna 1	Copper Box, London; Referees: Janne Ahokas (FIN), Hooshang Shariati (IRI)

4 September 2012; 19:45	Lithuania	2 – 2	Turkey	Copper Box, London; Referees: Hooshang Shariati (IRI), Dawna Christy (CAN)
4 September 2012; 19:45	Zibolis 2	Report	Alkan 1 Karakaya 1	Copper Box, London; Referees: Hooshang Shariati (IRI), Dawna Christy (CAN)

Quarter-final

5 September 2012; 18:00	China	4 – 12	Lithuania	Copper Box, London; Referees: Bülent Kimyon (TUR), Carla Da Matta (BRA)
5 September 2012; 18:00	Chen 2 Yongquan 2	Report	Zibolis 6 Juchna 4 Leonavičius 1 Pavliukianec 1	Copper Box, London; Referees: Bülent Kimyon (TUR), Carla Da Matta (BRA)

Semi-final

6 September 2012; 20:00	Brazil	2 – 1	Lithuania	Copper Box, London; Referees: Janne Ahokas (FIN), Shinji Mizuno (JPN)
6 September 2012; 20:00	Almeida Maciel Celente 1 Marques 1	Report	Leonavičius 1	Copper Box, London; Referees: Janne Ahokas (FIN), Shinji Mizuno (JPN)

Bronze Medal Match

7 September 2012; 18:30	Lithuania	1 – 4	Turkey	Copper Box, London; Referees: Juha Vuokila (FIN), Yasser Omar (EGY)
7 September 2012; 18:30	Zibolis 1	Report	Karakaya 4	Copper Box, London; Referees: Juha Vuokila (FIN), Yasser Omar (EGY)

== Swimming ==
Men

Athletes	Event	Heat		Final	
Athletes	Event	Time	Rank	Time	Rank
Kęstutis Skučas	50 m freestyle S4	52.13	13	did not advance	
Kęstutis Skučas	50 m backstroke S4	52.38	9	did not advance	

== See also ==
- Lithuania at the Paralympics
- Lithuania at the 2012 Summer Olympics
