= Goalball at the 2016 Summer Paralympics – Men's tournament =

The men's tournament in Goalball at the 2016 Summer Paralympics was contested from 8 to 16 September.

Twelve teams participated, with six athletes per team.

== Participating teams ==
Group A

- Algeria (roster)
- Brazil (roster)
- Canada (roster)
- Germany (roster)
- Sweden (roster)

Group B

- China (roster)
- Finland (roster)
- Lithuania (roster)
- Turkey (roster)
- United States (roster)

== Preliminary round ==
=== Group A ===
Pos	Team	Pld	W	D	L	GF	GA	GD	Pts	Qualification
1	Brazil (H)	4	4	0	0	42	15	+27	12	Quarter-finals
2	Sweden	4	3	0	1	33	23	+10	9	Quarter-finals
3	Germany	4	1	0	3	24	26	−2	3	Quarter-finals
4	Canada	4	1	0	3	26	39	−13	3	Quarter-finals
5	Algeria	4	1	0	3	25	47	−22	3	

Source: Paralympic.org
(H) Hosts

8 September 2016; 09:00	Brazil	9–6	Sweden	Future Arena, Rio de Janeiro; Referees: Bülent Kimyon (TUR), Patricia Fras (SLO)
8 September 2016; 09:00	Moreno 5 Sousa 2 Marques 1 Celente 1	Report	Björkstrand 5 Seremeti 1	Future Arena, Rio de Janeiro; Referees: Bülent Kimyon (TUR), Patricia Fras (SLO)

8 September 2016; 13:15	Algeria	0–10	Germany	Future Arena, Rio de Janeiro; Referees: Nejc Jakic (SLO), Daniel Voltan (BRA)
8 September 2016; 13:15		Report	Horauf 5 Feistle 4 Steiger 1	Future Arena, Rio de Janeiro; Referees: Nejc Jakic (SLO), Daniel Voltan (BRA)

9 September 2016; 13:15	Canada	3–11	Brazil	Future Arena, Rio de Janeiro; Referees: Patricia Fras (SLO), Nejc Jakic (SLO)
9 September 2016; 13:15	Hache 2 Ripley 1	Report	Marques 4 de Melo 3 Moreno 2 Sousa 1 Celente 1	Future Arena, Rio de Janeiro; Referees: Patricia Fras (SLO), Nejc Jakic (SLO)

9 September 2016; 17:30	Sweden	12–6	Algeria	Future Arena, Rio de Janeiro; Referees: Daniel Voltan (BRA), Yoshinori Nii (JPN)
9 September 2016; 17:30	Weichel 5 Björkstrand 4 Seremeti 3	Report	Belhouchat 5 Mokrane 1	Future Arena, Rio de Janeiro; Referees: Daniel Voltan (BRA), Yoshinori Nii (JPN)

10 September 2016; 17:30	Germany	5–7	Canada	Future Arena, Rio de Janeiro; Referees: Vilma Basinkaite (LTU), Raili Sipura (FIN)
10 September 2016; 17:30	Feistle 5	Report	Gaulin 6 Nesbitt 1	Future Arena, Rio de Janeiro; Referees: Vilma Basinkaite (LTU), Raili Sipura (FIN)

11 September 2016; 09:00	Brazil	12–2	Algeria	Future Arena, Rio de Janeiro; Referees: Alexander Knecht (GER), Bülent Kimyon (TUR)
11 September 2016; 09:00	Moreno 6 Marques 3 Sousa 2 Celente 1	Report	Mokrane 2	Future Arena, Rio de Janeiro; Referees: Alexander Knecht (GER), Bülent Kimyon (TUR)

12 September 2016; 09:00	Sweden	9–5	Germany	Future Arena, Rio de Janeiro; Referees: Bülent Kimyon (TUR), Dawna Christy (CAN)
12 September 2016; 09:00	Björkstrand 4 Seremeti 3 Gahne 2	Report	Feistle 3 Horauf 2	Future Arena, Rio de Janeiro; Referees: Bülent Kimyon (TUR), Dawna Christy (CAN)

12 September 2016; 11:30	Algeria	17–13	Canada	Future Arena, Rio de Janeiro; Referees: Raili Sipura (FIN), Alexander Knecht (GER)
12 September 2016; 11:30	Mokrane 9 Godmane 6 Larbi 1 Boutaleb 1	Report	Nesbitt 6 Hache 3 Gaulin 3 Larbi 1 (o.g)	Future Arena, Rio de Janeiro; Referees: Raili Sipura (FIN), Alexander Knecht (GER)

13 September 2016; 10:15	Germany	4–10	Brazil	Future Arena, Rio de Janeiro; Referees: Rudi Janssen (BEL), Raili Sipura (FIN)
13 September 2016; 10:15	Feistle 2 Horauf 2	Report	Sousa 4 Moreno 2 Celente 2 de Melo 2	Future Arena, Rio de Janeiro; Referees: Rudi Janssen (BEL), Raili Sipura (FIN)

13 September 2016; 14:15	Canada	3–6	Sweden	Future Arena, Rio de Janeiro; Referees: Alexander Knecht (GER), Vilma Basinkaite (LTU)
13 September 2016; 14:15	Nesbitt 2 Zeividavi 1	Report	Björkstrand 3 Seremeti 3	Future Arena, Rio de Janeiro; Referees: Alexander Knecht (GER), Vilma Basinkaite (LTU)

=== Group B ===
Pos	Team	Pld	W	D	L	GF	GA	GD	Pts	Qualification
1	Lithuania	4	4	0	0	35	22	+13	12	Quarter-finals
2	United States	4	2	0	2	21	18	+3	6	Quarter-finals
3	Turkey	4	2	0	2	20	23	−3	6	Quarter-finals
4	China	4	1	0	3	25	28	−3	3	Quarter-finals
5	Finland	4	1	0	3	24	34	−10	3	

Source: Paralympic.org

8 September 2016; 17:30	Finland	6–13	Lithuania	Future Arena, Rio de Janeiro; Referees: Raquel Aguado (ESP), Rudi Janssen (BEL)
8 September 2016; 17:30	Miinala 3 Mattila 1 Posio 1 Honkanen 1	Report	Pavliukianec 7 Pažarauskas 5 Panovas 1	Future Arena, Rio de Janeiro; Referees: Raquel Aguado (ESP), Rudi Janssen (BEL)

9 September 2016; 09:00	United States	5–2	China	Future Arena, Rio de Janeiro; Referees: Rudi Janssen (BEL), Raquel Aguado (ESP)
9 September 2016; 09:00	Hamilton 3 Kusku 2	Report	Cai 2	Future Arena, Rio de Janeiro; Referees: Rudi Janssen (BEL), Raquel Aguado (ESP)

10 September 2016; 09:00	Turkey	8–5	Finland	Future Arena, Rio de Janeiro; Referees: Alexander Knecht (GER), Rudi Janssen (BEL)
10 September 2016; 09:00	Gündoğdu 6 Alkan 1 Karakaya 1	Report	Mattila 5	Future Arena, Rio de Janeiro; Referees: Alexander Knecht (GER), Rudi Janssen (BEL)

10 September 2016; 13:15	Lithuania	8–7	United States	Future Arena, Rio de Janeiro; Referees: Raquel Aguado (ESP); Patricia Fras (SLO)
10 September 2016; 13:15	Pavliukianec 6 Pazarauskas 2	Report	Hamilton 5 Merren 2	Future Arena, Rio de Janeiro; Referees: Raquel Aguado (ESP); Patricia Fras (SLO)

11 September 2016; 13:15	China	10–3	Turkey	Future Arena, Rio de Janeiro; Referees: Vilma Basinkaite (LTU), Patricia Fras (SLO)
11 September 2016; 13:15	Chen 4 Cai 4 Hu 1 Shao 1	Report	Karakaya 2 Gündoğdu 1	Future Arena, Rio de Janeiro; Referees: Vilma Basinkaite (LTU), Patricia Fras (SLO)

11 September 2016; 17:30	Finland	2–6	United States	Future Arena, Rio de Janeiro; Referees: Dawna Christy (CAN), Yoshinori Nii (JPN)
11 September 2016; 17:30	Mattila 1 Posio 1	Report	Merren 4 Hamilton 1 Kusku 1	Future Arena, Rio de Janeiro; Referees: Dawna Christy (CAN), Yoshinori Nii (JPN)

12 September 2016; 14:15	Lithuania	3–1	China	Future Arena, Rio de Janeiro; Referees: Patricia Fras (SLO), Joelle Boulet (CAN)
12 September 2016; 14:15	Pavliukianec 2 Pazarauskas 1	Report	Chen 1	Future Arena, Rio de Janeiro; Referees: Patricia Fras (SLO), Joelle Boulet (CAN)

12 September 2016; 19:30	United States	3–6	Turkey	Future Arena, Rio de Janeiro; Referees: Raili Sipura (FIN), Daniel Voltan (BRA)
12 September 2016; 19:30	Kusku 1 Merren 1 Jenks 1	Report	Gündoğdu 4 Karakaya 2	Future Arena, Rio de Janeiro; Referees: Raili Sipura (FIN), Daniel Voltan (BRA)

13 September 2016; 18:15	China	7–11	Finland	Future Arena, Rio de Janeiro; Referees: Joelle Boulet (CAN), Alexander Knecht (GER)
13 September 2016; 18:15	Yang 4 Chen 1 Hu 1 Cai 1	Report	Mattila 6 Miinala 5	Future Arena, Rio de Janeiro; Referees: Joelle Boulet (CAN), Alexander Knecht (GER)

13 September 2016; 20:45	Turkey	3–5	Lithuania	Future Arena, Rio de Janeiro; Referees: Nejc Jakic (SLO), Daniel Voltan (BRA)
13 September 2016; 20:45	Karakaya 2 Gündoğdu 1	Report	Panovas 2 Pavliukianec 1 Pazarauskas 1 Montvydas 1	Future Arena, Rio de Janeiro; Referees: Nejc Jakic (SLO), Daniel Voltan (BRA)

== Knock-out round ==
Quarter-finals
14 September
Brazil	10
China	3
14 September
United States	7
Germany	6
14 September
Lithuania	5
Canada	4
14 September
Sweden	5
Turkey	1

Semi-finals
15 September
Brazil	1
United States	10
15 September
Lithuania	7
Sweden	2

Gold medal
16 September
United States	8
Lithuania	14
Bronze medal
16 September
Brazil (a.e.t.)	6
Sweden	5

=== Quarter-finals ===
14 September 2016; 09:00	Brazil	10–3	China	Future Arena, Rio de Janeiro; Referees: Yoshinori Nii (JPN), Rudi Janssen (BEL)
14 September 2016; 09:00	Moreno 8 Sousa 2	Report	Shao 2 Yang 1	Future Arena, Rio de Janeiro; Referees: Yoshinori Nii (JPN), Rudi Janssen (BEL)

14 September 2016; 12:00	United States	7–6	Germany	Future Arena, Rio de Janeiro; Referees: Daniel Voltan (BRA), Patricia Fras (SLO)
14 September 2016; 12:00	Merren 3 Hamilton 3 Kusku 1	Report	Steiger 3 Feistle 2 Horauf 1	Future Arena, Rio de Janeiro; Referees: Daniel Voltan (BRA), Patricia Fras (SLO)

14 September 2016; 18:00	Lithuania	5–4	Canada	Future Arena, Rio de Janeiro; Referees: Bülent Kimyon (TUR), Alexander Knecht (GER)
14 September 2016; 18:00	Pazarauskas 3 Pavliukianec 2	Report	Ripley 2 Hache 1 Nesbitt 1	Future Arena, Rio de Janeiro; Referees: Bülent Kimyon (TUR), Alexander Knecht (GER)

14 September 2016; 21:00	Sweden	5–1	Turkey	Future Arena, Rio de Janeiro; Referees: Nejc Jakic (SLO), Yoshinori Nii (JPN)
14 September 2016; 21:00	Seremeti 2 Weichel 2 Björkstrand 1	Report	Akyüz	Future Arena, Rio de Janeiro; Referees: Nejc Jakic (SLO), Yoshinori Nii (JPN)

=== Semi-finals ===
15 September 2016; 13:30	Brazil	1–10	United States	Future Arena, Rio de Janeiro; Referees: Bülent Kimyon (TUR), Raili Sipura (FIN)
15 September 2016; 13:30	Marques 1	Report	Merren 9 Hamilton 1	Future Arena, Rio de Janeiro; Referees: Bülent Kimyon (TUR), Raili Sipura (FIN)

15 September 2016; 18:30	Lithuania	7–2	Sweden	Future Arena, Rio de Janeiro; Referees: Yoshinori Nii (JPN), Raquel Aguado (ESP)
15 September 2016; 18:30	Pavliukianec 5 Pazarauskas 2	Report	Seremeti 1 Weichel 1	Future Arena, Rio de Janeiro; Referees: Yoshinori Nii (JPN), Raquel Aguado (ESP)

=== Bronze medal match ===
16 September 2016; 15:00	Brazil	6–5 (a.e.t.)	Sweden	Future Arena, Rio de Janeiro; Referees: Bülent Kimyon (TUR), Yoshinori Nii (JPN)
16 September 2016; 15:00	Moreno 4 Sousa 2	Report	Björkstrand 3 Seremeti 2	Future Arena, Rio de Janeiro; Referees: Bülent Kimyon (TUR), Yoshinori Nii (JPN)

=== Gold medal match ===
16 September 2016; 20:00	United States	8–14	Lithuania	Future Arena, Rio de Janeiro; Referees: Nejc Jakic (SLO), Daniel Voltan (BRA)
16 September 2016; 20:00	Simpson 4 Hamilton 1 Jenks 1 Merren 1 Walker 1	Report	Pavliukianec 8 Pazarauskas 6	Future Arena, Rio de Janeiro; Referees: Nejc Jakic (SLO), Daniel Voltan (BRA)

== Final rankings ==
Rank	Team
Gold medal	Lithuania
Silver medal	United States
Bronze medal	Brazil
4.	Sweden
5.	Turkey
6.	Germany
7.	China
8.	Canada
9.	Finland
10.	Algeria

2016 men's Paralympic champions

Lithuania
First title

Source: Paralympic.org

== See also ==
- Goalball at the 2016 Summer Paralympics – Women's tournament
