= Lithuania at the 1992 Summer Paralympics =

- IPC code: LTU
- NPC: Lithuanian Paralympic Committee
- Website: www.lpok.lt

in Barcelona
- Competitors: 4 in 1 sport
- Medals Ranked 46th: Gold 0 Silver 4 Bronze 3 Total 7

Summer Paralympics appearances (overview)
- 1992; 1996; 2000; 2004; 2008; 2012; 2016; 2020; 2024

Other related appearances
- Soviet Union (1988)

Lithuania competed at the 1992 Summer Paralympics in Barcelona, Spain.

== Medalists ==
| Medal | Name | Sport | Event |
|---|---|---|---|
| Silver | Vytautas Girnius | Athletics | Men's Pentathlon B1 |
| Silver | Sigita Kriaučiūnienė | Athletics | Women's 800 m B1 |
| Silver | Sigita Kriaučiūnienė | Athletics | Women's 1500 m B1 |
| Silver | Sigita Kriaučiūnienė | Athletics | Women's 3000 m B1 |
| Bronze | Sigita Kriaučiūnienė | Athletics | Women's 400 m B1 |
| Bronze | Danutė Smidek | Athletics | Women's 800 m B2 |
| Bronze | Malda Baumgartė | Athletics | Women's Pentathlon PW3–4 |

== See also ==
- Lithuania at the 1992 Summer Olympics
