= Lithuania at the 2000 Summer Paralympics =

- IPC code: LTU
- NPC: Lithuanian Paralympic Committee
- Website: www.lpok.lt

in Sydney
- Medals Ranked 56th: Gold 0 Silver 2 Bronze 1 Total 3

Summer Paralympics appearances (overview)
- 1992; 1996; 2000; 2004; 2008; 2012; 2016; 2020; 2024

Other related appearances
- Soviet Union (1988)

Lithuania competed at the 2000 Summer Paralympics in Sydney, Australia.

== Medalists ==
Medal	Name	Sport	Event
Silver	Rolandas Urbonas	Athletics	Men's Discus throw F12
Silver	Lithuania	Goalball	Men's team
Bronze	Kęstutis Bartkėnas	Athletics	Men's 5000 m T13

== See also ==
- Lithuania at the 2000 Summer Olympics
