= Lithuania at the 1994 Winter Paralympics =

- IPC code: LTU
- NPC: Lithuanian Paralympic Committee
- Website: www.lpok.lt

in Lillehammer
- Competitors: 2 in 1 sport
- Medals Ranked -th: Gold 0 Silver 0 Bronze 0 Total 0

Winter Paralympics appearances (overview)
- 1994; 1998–2022; 2026

Other related appearances
- Soviet Union (1988)

Lithuania, following its independence from the Soviet Union, made its Winter Paralympics début at the 1994 Winter Paralympics in Lillehammer, Norway. The country sent just two athletes, both in cross-country skiing: Sigita Kriaučiūnienė and Saulius Leonavičius. Lithuania's participation in the 1994 Paralympics was not only its first at the Winter Games, but also its last to date, although the country has continued to take part in every edition of the Summer Paralympics.

== Athletes ==
Kriaučiūnienė had previously competed for Lithuania at the 1992 Summer Paralympics, where she had won four medals (three silver and a bronze) in track and field. In 1994, she thus became one of a number of athletes to have taken part in both the Summer and the Winter Paralympics. They were her last Games. Leonavičius was appearing at the Paralympics for the first time. He would then go on to make his career at the Summer Games, winning a bronze medal in the 1,500m race for the blind in 1996, and silver as part of Lithuania's goalball team in 2008.

At the 1994 Winter Games, however, Kriaučiūnienė and Leonavičius did not win any medals. Kriaučiūnienė was disqualified in one event, and finished last in the other; Leonavičius ranked fairly low in all three of his events.

== Results ==
Name	Sport	Event	Time	Rank
Sigita Kriaučiūnienė	Cross-country skiing	Women's 5 km Classical Technique B1	dq	unranked (dq)
Sigita Kriaučiūnienė	Cross-country skiing	Women's 5 km Free Technique B1	real: 28:56.5 calculated: 23:09.2	8th (out of 8)
Saulius Leonavičius	Cross-country skiing	Men's 10 km Free Technique B2	37:16.9	17th (out of 19)
Saulius Leonavičius	Cross-country skiing	Men's 20 km Classical Technique B2	1:08:01.0	14th (out of 18)
Saulius Leonavičius	Cross-country skiing	Men's 5 km Classical Technique B2	18:41.1	16th (out of 19)

== See also ==
- Lithuania at the 1994 Winter Olympics
