= Swimming at the 2004 Summer Paralympics – Men's 50 metre backstroke S4 =

International sporting competition

Men's 50m Backstroke S4 at the XII Paralympic Games
- Paralympic Swimming
- Venue: Olympic Aquatic Centre
- Dates: 20 September 2004
- Competitors: 12 from 10 nations
- Winning time: 45.73

Medalists
1st place, gold medalist(s)		Juan Ignacio Reyes	Mexico
2nd place, silver medalist(s)		Kęstutis Skučas	Lithuania
3rd place, bronze medalist(s)		Zeng Hua Bin	China

The Men's 50 metre backstroke S4 swimming event at the 2004 Summer Paralympics was competed on 20 September. It was won by Juan Ignacio Reyes, representing Mexico.

== 1st round ==
Qualified for final round

Heat 1

20 Sept. 2004, morning session

Rank	Athlete	Time	Notes
1	Kęstutis Skučas (LTU)	50.41	
2	Jan Povysil (CZE)	53.40	
3	Nelson Lopes (POR)	53.68	
4	Joe McCarthy (USA)	54.79	
5	Stylianos Tsakonas (GRE)	55.08	
6	Arkaitz Garcia (ESP)	56.55	

Heat 2

20 Sept. 2004, morning session

Rank	Athlete	Time	Notes
1	Juan Ignacio Reyes (MEX)	46.18	PR
2	Zeng Hua Bin (CHN)	49.96	
3	Clodoaldo Silva (BRA)	53.50	
4	Gaetan Dautresire (FRA)	54.04	
5	Joon Sok Seo (BRA)	54.36	
6	Ivan Fernandez (ESP)	55.88	

== Final round ==
20 Sept. 2004, evening session

Rank	Athlete	Time	Notes
1st place, gold medalist(s)	Juan Ignacio Reyes (MEX)	45.73	WR
2nd place, silver medalist(s)	Kęstutis Skučas (LTU)	47.62	
3rd place, bronze medalist(s)	Zeng Hua Bin (CHN)	50.46	
4	Clodoaldo Silva (BRA)	51.71	
5	Gaetan Dautresire (FRA)	53.06	
6	Nelson Lopes (POR)	53.83	
7	Joon Sok Seo (BRA)	54.77	
8	Jan Povysil (CZE)	54.82	
