= Lithuania at the 2024 Summer Paralympics =

- Flag of Lithuania
- IPC code: LTU
- NPC: Lithuanian Paralympic Committee

in Paris, France August 28, 2024 – September 8, 2024
- Competitors: 9 (4 men and 5 women) in 4 sports
- Flag bearers: Gabriele Cepaviciute; Donatas Dundzys
- Medals Ranked 79th: Gold 0 Silver 0 Bronze 1 Total 1

Summer Paralympics appearances (overview)
- 1992; 1996; 2000; 2004; 2008; 2012; 2016; 2020; 2024

Other related appearances
- Soviet Union (1988)

Lithuania competed at the 2024 Summer Paralympics in Paris, France, from 28 August to 8 September.

== Medalists ==
Medal	Name	Sport	Event	Date
Bronze	Osvaldas Bareikis	Judo	Men's 73 kg J2	6 September

=== Medals by sport ===
Medals by sport
Sport	1st place, gold medalist(s)	2nd place, silver medalist(s)	3rd place, bronze medalist(s)	Total
Judo	0	0	1	1
Total	0	0	1	1

=== Medals by gender ===
Medals by gender
Gender	1st place, gold medalist(s)	2nd place, silver medalist(s)	3rd place, bronze medalist(s)	Total
Female	0	0	0	0
Male	0	0	1	1
Mixed	0	0	0	0
Total	0	0	1	1

=== Medals by date ===
Medals by date
Date	1st place, gold medalist(s)	2nd place, silver medalist(s)	3rd place, bronze medalist(s)	Total
6 September	0	0	1	1
Total	0	0	1	1

== Competitors ==
The following is the list of number of competitors in the Games.

Sport	Men	Women	Total
Athletics	2	3	5
Judo	1	0	1
Shooting	0	1	1
Swimming	1	1	2
Total	4	5	9

== Athletics ==
Key

- Note–Ranks given for track events are within the athlete's heat only
- Q = Qualified for the next round
- q = Qualified for the next round as a fastest loser or, in field events, by position without achieving the qualifying target
- DQ = Disqualified
- PR = Paralympic Record
- AR = Area (or continental) Record
- NR = National Record
- SB = Season's Best
- N/A = Round not applicable for the event
- Bye = Athlete not required to compete in round

Track & road events
Women

Athlete	Event	Heat		Final	
Athlete	Event	Result	Rank	Result	Rank
Ausra Garunksnyte	Women's marathon T12	—N/a		3:18:41	6

Field event

Athlete	Event	Final	
Athlete	Event	Result	Rank
Donatas Dundzys	Men's shot put F37	13.63	7
Donatas Dundzys	Men's discus throw F37	44.45	10
Andrius Skuja	Men's shot put F46	14.95	6
Oksana Dobrovolskaja	Women's discus throw F11	34.49	5
Eivyde Vainauskaite	Women's shot put F46		

== Judo ==
Athlete	Event	Round of 16	Quarterfinals	Semifinals	Repechage Round 1	Repechage Round 2	Final / BM	
Athlete	Event	Opposition Result	Opposition Result	Opposition Result	Opposition Result	Opposition Result	Opposition Result	Rank
Osvaldas Bareikis	Men's 73 kg J2	Bye	Kim (KOR); W 01–00	Seto (JPN); L 00–11	—N/a		Petit (FRA); W 01–00	3rd place, bronze medalist(s)

== Shooting ==
Women

Athlete	Event	Qualification		Final	
Athlete	Event	Points	Rank	Points	Rank
Raimeda Bucinskyte	P2 – 10 m air pistol SH1				

== Swimming ==
Athlete	Event	Heats		Final	
Athlete	Event	Result	Rank	Result	Rank
Edgaras Matakas	Men's 50 m freestyle S11	26.75	5 Q	26.68	=6
Edgaras Matakas	Men's 100 m breaststroke SB11				
Gabriele Cepaviciute	Women's 100 m backstroke S6				
Gabriele Cepaviciute	Women's 200 m individual medley SM6				

== See also ==
- Lithuania at the 2024 Summer Olympics
- Lithuania at the Paralympics
