= Athletics at the 2008 Summer Paralympics – Women's shot put F37–38 =

Women's Shot Put F37/38 at the XIII Paralympic Games
- Venue: Beijing National Stadium
- Dates: 11 September
- Competitors: 18 from 11 nations
- Winning distance: 11.58

Medalists
1st place, gold medalist(s)		Mi Na	China
2nd place, silver medalist(s)		Aldona Grigaliuniene	Lithuania
3rd place, bronze medalist(s)		Eva Berna	Czech Republic

The women's shot put F37/38 event at the 2008 Summer Paralympics took place at the Beijing National Stadium at 18:25 on 11 September. There was a single round of competition; after the first three throws, only the top eight had 3 further throws. The competition was won by Mi Na, representing China.

== Results ==
Rank	Athlete	Nationality	Cl.	1	2	3	4	5	6	Best	Pts.	Notes
1st place, gold medalist(s)	Mi Na	China	F37	11.07	11.58	10.96	11.37	10.54	x	11.58	1129	WR
2nd place, silver medalist(s)	Aldona Grigaliuniene	Lithuania	F38	11.86	12.54	12.58	x	12.12	11.86	12.58	1102	WR
3rd place, bronze medalist(s)	Eva Berna	Czech Republic	F37	9.86	10.64	10.67	10.27	10.84	x	10.84	1057	
4	Amanda Fraser	Australia	F37	9.99	9.86	9.59	9.65	10.52	9.27	10.52	1026	SB
5	Beverley Jones	Great Britain	F37	9.64	8.49	9.92	9.90	10.35	9.22	10.35	1009	SB
6	Xu Qiuping	China	F37	9.68	9.55	9.70	9.90	9.52	10.21	10.21	996	
7	Jia Qianqian	China	F37	10.11	x	9.95	9.22	9.36	9.55	10.11	986	
8	Shirlene Coelho	Brazil	F37	9.59	9.49	10.09	9.72	9.18	9.90	10.09	984	SB
9	Melanie Barthe	France	F37	9.67	9.14	8.62	-	-	-	9.67	943	
10	Rebecca Chin	Great Britain	F38	10.47	9.72	10.26	-	-	-	10.47	917	SB
11	Ramune Adomaitiene	Lithuania	F38	10.03	9.41	x	-	-	-	10.03	878	
12	Vladimira Bujarkova	Czech Republic	F37	8.62	7.63	8.96	-	-	-	8.96	874	SB
13	Nela Zabloudilova	Czech Republic	F37	8.84	7.90	8.65	-	-	-	8.84	862	
14	Anna Raszczuk	Poland	F38	9.82	9.39	x	-	-	-	9.82	860	
15	Fatma Kachroudi	Tunisia	F37	8.11	8.70	8.23	-	-	-	8.70	849	
16	Svetlana Sergeeva	Russia	F37	8.57	7.83	7.61	-	-	-	8.57	836	
17	Ingrida Priede	Latvia	F38	8.79	8.79	9.21	-	-	-	9.21	807	
18	Liene Gruzite	Latvia	F37	7.66	7.60	7.22	-	-	-	7.66	747	

WR = World Record. SB = Seasonal Best.
