= Swimming at the 2008 Summer Paralympics – Men's 50 metre backstroke S4 =

Men's 50m Backstroke S4 at the XIII Paralympic Games
- Venue: Beijing National Aquatics Center
- Dates: 8 September
- Competitors: 11 from 10 nations
- Winning time: 42.77

Medalists
1st place, gold medalist(s)		Juan Reyes	Mexico
2nd place, silver medalist(s)		David Smétanine	France
3rd place, bronze medalist(s)		Zeng Huabin	China

The men's 50m backstroke S4 event at the 2008 Summer Paralympics took place at the Beijing National Aquatics Center on 8 September. There were two heats; the swimmers with the eight fastest times advanced to the final.

== Results ==
=== Heats ===
Competed from 10:01.

==== Heat 1 ====
Rank	Name	Nationality	Time	Notes
1	David Smétanine	France	47.39	Q
2	Arnost Petracek	Czech Republic	50.96	Q
3	Stylianos Tsakonas	Greece	51.04	Q
4	Arkaitz Garcia Tolson	Spain	55.01	
5	Joon Seo	Brazil	56.70	

==== Heat 2 ====
Rank	Name	Nationality	Time	Notes
1	Juan Reyes	Mexico	42.71	Q, WR
2	Zeng Huabin	China	49.44	Q
3	Kestutis Skucas	Lithuania	49.67	Q
4	Jan Povysil	Czech Republic	52.46	Q
5	Nelson Lopes	Portugal	52.74	Q
6	Joe McCarthy	United States	55.70	

=== Final ===
Competed at 18:36.

Rank	Name	Nationality	Time	Notes
1st place, gold medalist(s)	Juan Reyes	Mexico	42.77	
2nd place, silver medalist(s)	David Smétanine	France	48.66	
3rd place, bronze medalist(s)	Zeng Huabin	China	49.02	
4	Arnost Petracek	Czech Republic	50.40	
5	Kestutis Skucas	Lithuania	50.59	
6	Stylianos Tsakonas	Greece	51.15	
7	Jan Povysil	Czech Republic	52.79	
8	Nelson Lopes	Portugal	53.38	

Q = qualified for final. WR = World Record.
