= Donatas Dundzys =

Lithuanian Paralympic athlete

Personal information
- Born: 4 December 1991 (age 34) Alytus, Lithuania
- Height: 1.83 m (6 ft 0 in)

Sport
- Country: Lithuania
- Sport: Paralympic athletics
- Disability: Cerebral palsy
- Disability class: F37
- Event(s): Discus throw Shot put
Medal record
Paralympic athletics
Representing Lithuania
World Championships
Bronze medal – third place	2017 London	Shot put F37
European Championships
Silver medal – second place	2020 Bydgoszcz	Discus throw F37
Bronze medal – third place	2016 Grosseto	Shot put F37
Bronze medal – third place	2018 Berlin	Shot put F37
Bronze medal – third place	2020 Bydgoszcz	Shot put F37

Donatas Dundzys (born 4 December 1991) is a Lithuanian Paralympic athlete who competes in discus throw and shot put at international elite track and field competitions. He is a World bronze medalist and three-time European bronze medalist in shot put and a European silver medalist in the discus throw. He competed at the 2020 Summer Paralympics where he competed in the discus throw and shot put and finished seventh and sixth place respectively.
