= Ramunė Adomaitienė =

Lithuanian Paralympic track and field athlete

Personal information
- Born: 5 November 1968 (age 57) Klaipėda, Soviet Union

Sport
- Country: Lithuania
- Sport: Paralympic athletics
- Disability class: T38, F38
- Event(s): Long jump Discus throw
Medal record
Paralympic athletics
Representing Lithuania
World Championships
Gold medal – first place	2006 Assen	Javelin throw F35–36/38
Gold medal – first place	2011 Christchurch	Long jump F38
Silver medal – second place	2006 Assen	Shot put F38
Silver medal – second place	2013 Lyon	Long jump T37/38
Silver medal – second place	2015 Doha	Long jump T38
Bronze medal – third place	2011 Christchurch	Javelin throw F38
European Championships
Silver medal – second place	2016 Grosseto	Long jump T38
Bronze medal – third place	2014 Swansea	Long jump T38

Ramunė Adomaitienė (born 5 November 1968) is an athlete set to compete for Lithuania at the 2020 Summer Paralympics. In her youth she considered competing in heptathlon at the Olympics but did not make the, then, Soviet team and in time became a physical education teacher. She became disabled due to a vehicular accident that killed her husband. She competed in the 2012 and 2016 Paralympics.
