= Joseph Hamilton (goalball) =

American goalball player

Joe Hamilton
Personal information
- Full name: Joseph Hamilton
- Born: June 9, 1978 (age 48) Wayne, Michigan, U.S.
- Home town: Sacramento, California, U.S.
- Height: 6 ft 4 in (193 cm)
- Weight: 234 lb (106 kg)

Sport
- Country: United States
- Sport: Goalball
Medal record
Men's goalball
Representing United States
Paralympic Games
Silver medal – second place	2016 Rio de Janeiro	Team
World Championships
Bronze medal – third place	2014 Espoo	Team
Parapan American Games
Silver medal – second place	2011 Guadalajara	Team
Silver medal – second place	2015 Toronto	Team

Joseph Hamilton (born June 9, 1978) is an American goalball player.

When Hamilton was a baby, he had a corneal transplant in his left eye after contracting rubella virus in the womb which restored his partial sight. He was left totally blind at the age of 12 after a snowboarding accident and two years later, he was introduced to goalball aged 14.

At the 2016 Summer Paralympics, Hamilton won a silver medal as a member of the U.S. goalball team.
