= Algirdas Tatulis =

Lithuanian Paralympic athlete

Medal record

Paralympic athletics

Representing Lithuania

Paralympic Games
Bronze medal – third place	2004 Athens	Discus Throw - F42

Algirdas Tatulis is a paralympic athlete from Lithuania competing mainly in category F42 shot put and discus events.

Algirdas competed in both the shot put and discus in the 1996 and 2000 Summer Paralympics but it wasn't till concentrating on the discus in 2004 that he won a medal, a bronze. This feat he was unable to match when again competing solely in the discus at the 2008 Summer Paralympics.
