= Jarno Mattila =

Finnish footballer (born 1984)

Personal information
- Date of birth: 10 November 1984 (age 41)
- Place of birth: Valkeakoski, Finland
- Height: 1.82 m (5 ft 11 1/2 in)
- Positions: Forward; left back

Senior career*
Years	Team	Apps	(Gls)
2003–2016	FC Haka	240	(23)
- * Club domestic league appearances and goals

Jarno Mattila (born 10 November 1984) is a Finnish former professional footballer. He usually played on the left side as a defender or a midfielder, originally he has mostly played at striker.

He won the Finnish Cup with his side FC Haka in 2005.
