= Malda Baumgartė =

Latvian-born Lithuanian athlete (born 1965)

Personal information
- Born: 7 January 1965 (age 61) Ventspils, Latvian SSR, Soviet Union

Sport
- Country: Lithuania
- Sport: Paralympic athletics
- Disability: Incomplete spinal cord injury
- Disability class: F44
Medal record
Paralympic athletics
Representing Lithuania
Paralympic Games
Gold medal – first place	1996 Atlanta	Discus throw F41
Gold medal – first place	1996 Atlanta	Shot put F41
Bronze medal – third place	1992 Barcelona	Pentathlon PW3-4
World Championships
Gold medal – first place	1998 Birmingham	Javelin throw F44
Silver medal – second place	1998 Birmingham	Discus throw F44/46
Silver medal – second place	2002 Villeneuve d'Ascq	Javelin throw F42-46

Malda Baumgartė (born 7 January 1965) is a Latvian-born Lithuanian retired paralympic athlete who competed at international track and field competitions, she competed in discus throw, javelin throw, shot put and formerly pentathlon. She is a double Paralympic champion and a world champion in her disciplines. She is also a former sitting volleyball player.

== Stabbing ==
On Christmas Eve in 1986, Baumgartė walked home after finishing her work shift late at night. On the way, she was jumped by a man who stabbed her in the back twice. She was spotted lying on the snow by a passerby hours later. Doctors managed to reconnect the nerves in her spine and was hoped that she would be able to walk again; she required the use of a wheelchair for three to four months. The man who stabbed Baumgartė was sentenced to eight years in jail. She decided to move to Lithuania and gained Lithuanian citizenship.
