= Kęstutis Bartkėnas =

Lithuanian Paralympic athlete

Medal record

Paralympic athletics

Representing Lithuania

Paralympic Games
Silver medal – second place	1996 Atlanta	5000 metres - T11
Bronze medal – third place	1996 Atlanta	10000 metres - T11
Bronze medal – third place	2000 Sydney	5000 metres - T13
Bronze medal – third place	2004 Athens	10000 metres - T13

Kęstutis Bartkėnas is a paralympic athlete from Lithuania competing mainly in category T11 distance running events.

Kestutis has competed and won medals at three Paralympics. His first was in 1996 in Atlanta where he competed in the 1500m and won z bronze in the 10000m and a silver in the 5000m. He followed this up in 2000 with a bronze in the 5000m as well as competing in the 1500m. For the 2004 Summer Paralympics Kestutis moved up in distance winning a bronze medal in the 10000m but ultimately failed to finish in the marathon.
