= Vytautas Girnius =

Lithuanian Paralympic athlete (born 1959)

Personal information
- Born: 4 February 1959 (age 67) Virbalis, Soviet Union

Sport
- Country: Lithuania
- Sport: Paralympic athletics
- Disability class: B1
Medal record
Paralympic athletics
Representing Soviet Union
Paralympic Games
Gold medal – first place	1988 Seoul	Javelin throw B1
Gold medal – first place	1988 Seoul	Pentathlon B1
Representing Lithuania
Paralympic Games
Silver medal – second place	1992 Barcelona	Pentathlon B1
Silver medal – second place	1996 Atlanta	Javelin throw F10
World Championships
Bronze medal – third place	2002 Lille	Javelin throw F11

Vytautas Girnius (born 4 February 1959) is a retired Lithuanian Paralympic athlete who competed at international track and field competitions. He is a double Paralympic champion for the Soviet Union in 1988 Summer Paralympics, he is also a two-time Paralympic silver medalist and a World bronze medalist for Lithuania.

== Disability ==
In 1972, thirteen year old Girnius and a few of his friends played games in his hometown. One of his friends found a WW2 bomb grenade, his friend detonated the bomb by puncturing it with a nail. The force of the blast killed two of his friends, one aged fifteen and the other thirteen, Girnius lost his eyesight permanently from the explosion.

=== Sporting achievements ===
Once Girnius left hospital, he was interested in competing in athletics. In 1980, he joined the Kaunas Academy for the Blind and Visually Impaired coached by Jonas Burakov. He took part in the 1988 Summer Paralympics and won two gold medals where he became the first Paralympic champion for Lithuania. In 1992, he competed once more at the 1992 Summer Paralympics where he competed for his home country after Lithuania became independent in the year before, he won a silver medal in the pentathlon and was one of the first six independent Lithuanian medalists. Girnius was awarded the Order of the Grand Duke Gediminas III in 1996 and the Fair Play Laureate Prize a year later.
