= Aldona Grigaliūnienė =

Lithuanian Paralympic athlete

Medal record

Paralympic athletics

Representing Lithuania

Paralympic Games
Gold medal – first place	1996 Atlanta	Long Jump - F34-37
Gold medal – first place	2004 Athens	Shot Put - F37-38
Silver medal – second place	2008 Beijing	Shot Put - F37-38

Aldona Grigaliūnienė is a Paralympian athlete from Lithuania competing mainly in category F37-38 shot put events. She won at the 2004 paralympics but she was beaten to silver in 2008.

== Life ==
She competed in the 1996 Summer Paralympics in Seoul, South Korea. There she won a gold medal in the women's F34-37 long jump event.

After missing the 2000 Summer Paralympics she returned to the 2004 Summer Paralympics in Athens, Greece. There she won a gold medal in the women's F37-38 shot put event. Four years later in 2008 in Beijing, People's Republic of China she failed in defending her title winning the silver medal and losing out to Mi Na of China.
