= Mantas Brazauskis =

Lithuanian goalball player

Personal information
- Born: 15 June 1990 (age 36) Vilnius, Lithuania

Sport
- Country: Lithuania
- Sport: Goalball
Medal record
Goalball
Representing Lithuania
Paralympic Games
Gold medal – first place	2016 Rio de Janeiro	Men's tournament
Bronze medal – third place	2020 Tokyo	Men's tournament
IBSA World Games
Gold medal – first place	2015 Seoul	Men's tournament
European Championships
Gold medal – first place	2013 Konia	Men's tournament
Gold medal – first place	2017 Lahti	Men's tournament
Silver medal – second place	2011 Denmark	Men's tournament
Bronze medal – third place	2015 Kaunas	Men's tournament
Bronze medal – third place	2019 Rostock	Men's tournament

Mantas Brazauskis (born 15 June 1990) is a Lithuanian goalball player who competes in international elite competitions. He is a Paralympic champion, World Games champion and double European champion.
