= Sigita Markevičienė =

Lithuanian Paralympic athlete

Personal information
- Born: 6 May 1962 (age 64) Panevėžys, Soviet Union
- Height: 1.64 m (5 ft 5 in)
- Weight: 52 kg (115 lb)

Sport
- Country: Lithuania
- Sport: Paralympic athletics
- Disability class: B1
Medal record
Paralympic athletics
Representing Lithuania
Paralympic Games
Silver medal – second place	1992 Barcelona	800m B1
Silver medal – second place	1992 Barcelona	1500m B1
Silver medal – second place	1992 Barcelona	3000m B1
Bronze medal – third place	1992 Barcelona	400m B1
Bronze medal – third place	1996 Atlanta	800m T10-11
Bronze medal – third place	1996 Atlanta	1500m T10-11
World Championships
Gold medal – first place	1994 Berlin	400m B1
Bronze medal – third place	1994 Berlin	800m B1
Bronze medal – third place	1994 Berlin	1500m B1

Sigita Markevičienė (née Kriaučiūninė, born 6 May 1962) is a Lithuanian Paralympic athlete who competed in middle-distance running events at international track and field competitions. She is a six-time Paralympic medalist and a former world record holder in the 1500m B1 and 5000m B1. Markevičienė lost her sight in 1986 following a car accident.
