= Justas Pažarauskas =

Lithuanian goalball player

Personal information
- Born: 1991 (age 34–35) Joniškis, Lithuania

Sport
- Country: Lithuania
- Sport: Goalball
Medal record
Goalball
Representing Lithuania
Paralympic Games
Gold medal – first place	2016 Rio de Janeiro	Men's tournament
Bronze medal – third place	2020 Tokyo	Men's tournament
IBSA World Games
Gold medal – first place	2015 Seoul	Men's tournament
World Championships
Gold medal – first place	2018 Malmo	Men's tournament

Justas Pažarauskas (born 1991) is a Lithuanian goalball player who competes in international elite competitions. He is a Paralympic champion, World Games champion and European champion.
