= Rolandas Urbonas =

Lithuanian Paralympic athlete

Medal record

Paralympic athletics

Representing Lithuania

Paralympic Games
Silver medal – second place	2000 Sydney	Discus throw F12
Bronze medal – third place	1996 Atlanta	Shot put F12
Bronze medal – third place	2004 Athens	Discus throw F12

Rolandas Urbonas is a paralympic athlete from Lithuania competing mainly in category F12 shot and discus events.

Rolandas has competed at four Paralympics and has won three medals. His first games he only competed in the F12 shot put winning the bronze medal. During the next three Paralympics he competed in the shot and discus winning a silver in the discus in 2000 and a bronze medal in the discus in 2004 but could not win any medals in 2008.
