= Marius Zibolis =

Lithuanian goalball player (1974–2023)

Personal information
- Born: 14 October 1974 Vilkaviškis, Lithuanian SSR, USSR
- Died: 18 January 2023 (aged 48)

Sport
- Country: Lithuania
- Sport: Goalball
Medal record
Goalball
Representing Lithuania
Paralympic Games
Silver medal – second place	2000 Sydney	Men's tournament
Silver medal – second place	2008 Beijing	Men's tournament
Bronze medal – third place	2020 Tokyo	Men's tournament
European Championships
Gold medal – first place	2007 Alanya	Men's tournament
Gold medal – first place	2009 Munich	Men's tournament
Gold medal – first place	2013 Konia	Men's tournament
Gold medal – first place	2017 Lahti	Men's tournament
Silver medal – second place	2001 Budapest	Men's tournament
Silver medal – second place	2011 Denmark	Men's tournament
Bronze medal – third place	2015 Kaunas	Men's tournament
Bronze medal – third place	2019 Rostock	Men's tournament

Marius Zibolis (14 October 1974 – 18 January 2023) was a Lithuanian goalball player who competed in international elite competitions. He was a double Paralympic silver medalist and a four-time European champion.
