= Mantas Panovas =

Lithuanian former goalball player

Personal information
- Born: 20 August 1989 (age 36) Rokiškis, Lithuania

Sport
- Country: Lithuania
- Sport: Goalball
- Retired: 2020
Medal record
Goalball
Representing Lithuania
Paralympic Games
Gold medal – first place	2016 Rio de Janeiro	Men's tournament
IBSA World Games
Gold medal – first place	2015 Seoul	Men's tournament
Gold medal – first place	2017 Fort Wayne	Men's tournament
World Championships
Gold medal – first place	2010 Sheffield	Men's tournament
European Championships
Gold medal – first place	2009 Munich	Men's tournament
Gold medal – first place	2013 Konya	Men's tournament
Gold medal – first place	2017 Lahti	Men's tournament
Bronze medal – third place	2015 Kaunas	Men's tournament
Bronze medal – third place	2019 Rostock	Men's tournament

Mantas Panovas (born 20 August 1989) is a Lithuanian former goalball player who competed at international goalball competitions. He is a Paralympic champion, World champion and triple European champion. He was a former long jumper and sprinter before switching to goalball in 2007, he played for Lithuania's men's national goalball team from 2009 to 2020, he retired early following injury problems.
