= Kęstutis Skučas =

Lithuanian Paralympic athlete

Personal information
- Born: 27 August 1967 (age 58) Kaunas, Soviet Union
- Height: 1.83 m (6 ft 0 in)

Sport
- Country: Lithuania
- Sport: Paralympic athletics
- Disability: Spinal cord injury
- Disability class: T52
Medal record
Paralympic athletics
Representing Lithuania
European Athletics Championships
Gold medal – first place	2018 Berlin	400m T52
Silver medal – second place	2018 Berlin	1500m T52
Silver medal – second place	2020 Bydgoszcz	1500m T52
Bronze medal – third place	2016 Grosseto	Discus throw F52
Bronze medal – third place	2020 Bydgoszcz	400m T52
Paralympic swimming
Paralympic Games
Silver medal – second place	2004 Athens	50m backstroke S4
World Swimming Championships
Silver medal – second place	2002 Mar del Plata	50m backstroke S4
Silver medal – second place	2006 Durban	50m backstroke S4

Kęstutis Skučas (born 27 August 1967) is a Lithuanian Paralympic athlete who competes in international elite track and field competitions in wheelchair racing and occasionally discus throw and a former Paralympic swimmer. He is a European champion in the 400m and is also a European bronze medalist in the discus throw. Skučas is a double World silver medalist and Paralympic silver medalist in backstroke swimming.

Skučas joined the Soviet military after he had left high school aged nineteen. He was sent to Arkhangelsk Oblast, Russia and while he served there, he developed inflammation in his spinal cord and sharp back pain attributed to the cold temperatures which often dropped to -40 Celsius. Medics told Skučas that he had developed a tumour in his spinal cord and was taken to emergency surgery in Saint Petersburg which proved unsuccessful as he had lost feeling below his armpits.
