= Nerijus Montvydas =

Lithuanian goalball player

Personal information
- Born: 21 January 1985 (age 41) Vilnius, Lithuania

Sport
- Country: Lithuania
- Sport: Goalball
Medal record
Goalball
Representing Lithuania
Paralympic Games
Gold medal – first place	2016 Rio de Janeiro	Men's tournament
Silver medal – second place	2008 Beijing	Men's tournament
Bronze medal – third place	2020 Tokyo	Men's tournament
European Championships
Gold medal – first place	2007 Alanya	Men's tournament
Gold medal – first place	2009 Munich	Men's tournament
Gold medal – first place	2013 Konia	Men's tournament
Gold medal – first place	2017 Lahti	Men's tournament
Silver medal – second place	2011 Denmark	Men's tournament
Bronze medal – third place	2015 Kaunas	Men's tournament

Nerijus Montvydas (born 21 January 1985) is a Lithuanian goalball player who competes in international elite events. He is a Paralympic champion and a four-time European champion.
