= Genrik Pavliukianec =

Lithuanian goalball player (born 1976)

Personal information
- Born: 17 June 1976 (age 50) Vilnius, Lithuanian SSR, Soviet Union

Sport
- Country: Lithuania
- Sport: Goalball
Medal record
Goalball
Representing Lithuania
Paralympic Games
| Gold medal – first place | 2016 Rio de Janeiro | Men's tournament |
| Silver medal – second place | 2000 Sydney | Men's tournament |
| Silver medal – second place | 2008 Beijing | Men's tournament |
| Bronze medal – third place | 2020 Tokyo | Men's tournament |
World Championships
| Gold medal – first place | 2006 Spartanburg | Men's tournament |
| Gold medal – first place | 2010 Sheffield | Men's tournament |
| Silver medal – second place | 2002 Rio de Janeiro | Men's tournament |
| Bronze medal – third place | 1998 Madrid | Men's tournament |
IBSA World Games
| Gold medal – first place | 2015 Seoul | Men's tournament |
European Championships
| Gold medal – first place | 1996 Georgia | Men’s tournament |
| Gold medal – first place | 2007 Alanya | Men's tournament |
| Gold medal – first place | 2009 Munich | Men's tournament |
| Gold medal – first place | 2013 Konia | Men's tournament |
| Silver medal – second place | 2001 Budapest | Men's tournament |
| Silver medal – second place | 2011 Denmark | Men's tournament |
| Bronze medal – third place | 2015 Kaunas | Men's tournament |

Genrik Pavliukianec (born 17 June 1976) is a Lithuanian goalball player, he was regarded as the best striker in world. He competed at the five Paralympic Games and has won three medals including a gold medal at the Games, he was also three-time European champion and a double World champion.
