= Lithuanian Paralympic Committee =

National Paralympic Committee of Lithuania

National Paralympic Committee
- Country: Lithuania
- Code: LTU
- Created: 1990
- Recognized: 1991
- Headquarters: Vilnius, Lithuania
- President: Mindaugas Bilius
- Secretary General: Paulius Kalvelis
- Website: parateam.lt

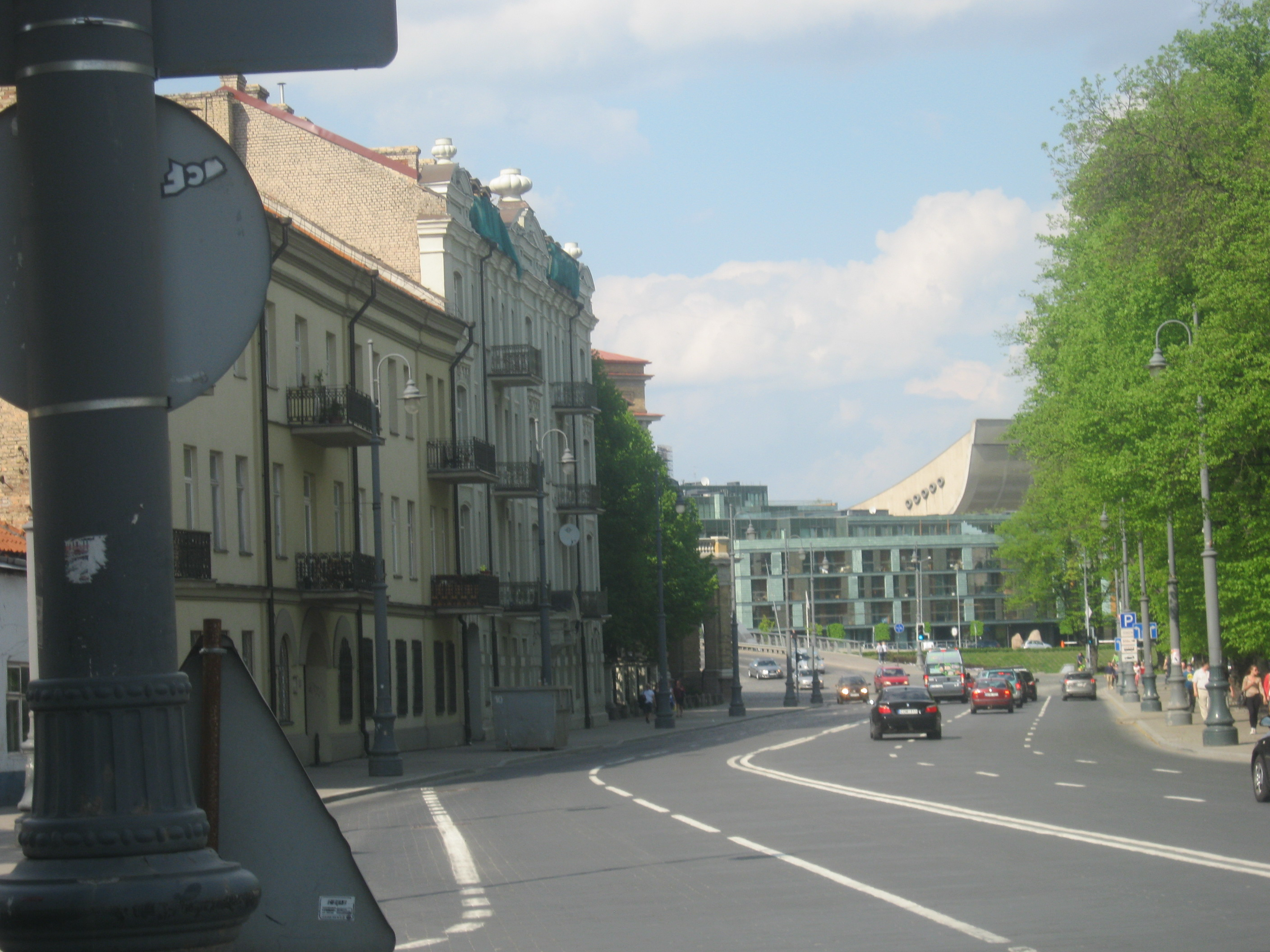
Lithuanian Paralympic Committee building

The Lithuanian Paralympic Committee (Lithuanian: Lietuvos paralimpinis komitetas or LPAK, formerly Lietuvos parolimpinis komitetas or LPOK) was founded in 1990 and recognized by the International Paralympic Committee after one year.

== Presidents ==
- Jonas Mačiukevičius – 1990-1992
- Vytautas Kvietkauskas – 1992-2005
- Vytautas Girnius – 2005–2009
- Vytautas Kvietkauskas – 2009-2017
- Mindaugas Bilius – since 2017
