= China men's national goalball team =

Chinese national team, for the Paralympic sport of goalball

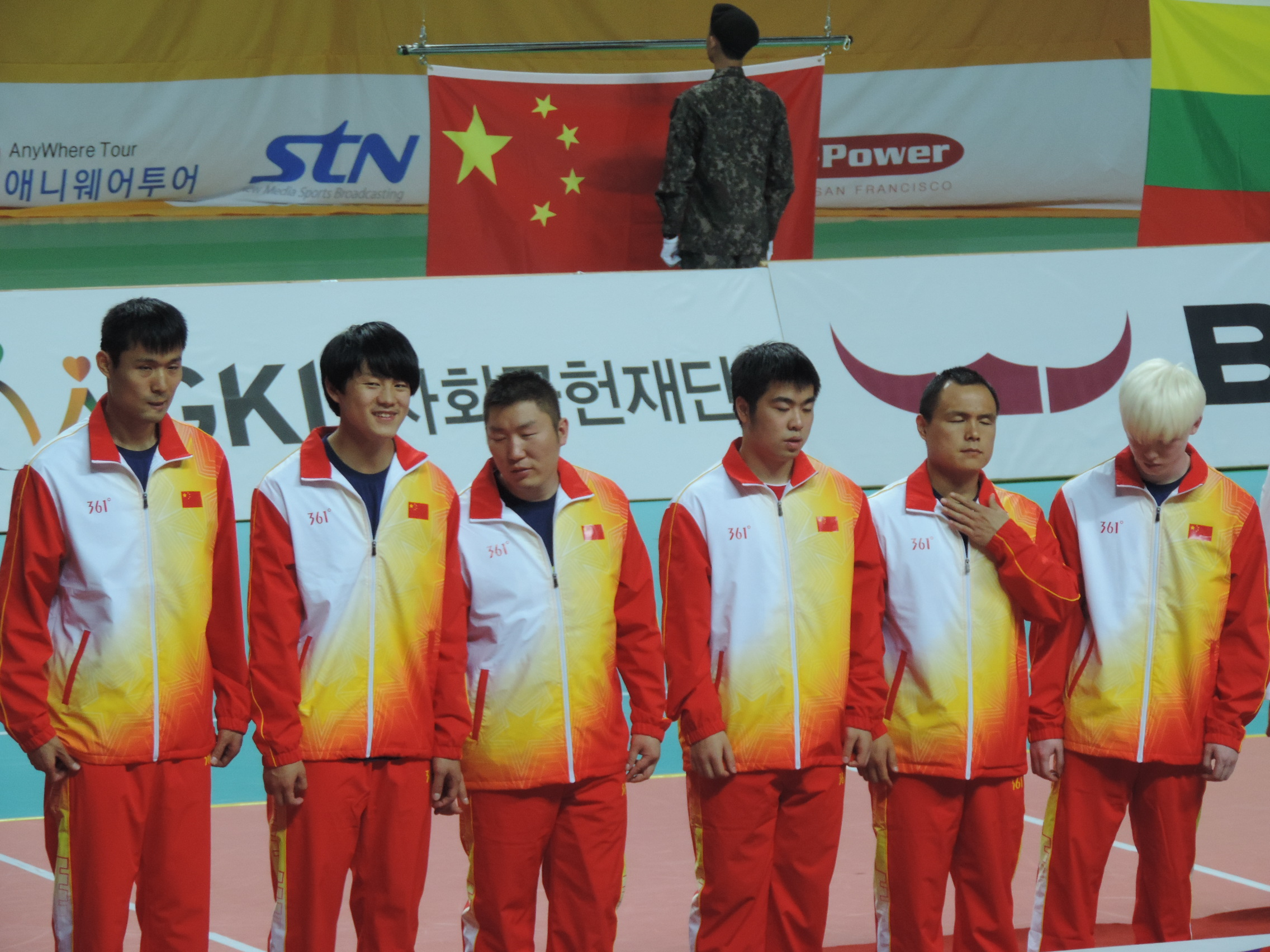
- Silver medalists at the IBSA World Games, Seoul, South Korea (May 2015).
- Sport: Goalball
- League: IBSA
- Division: Men
- Region: IBSA Asia
- Location: China
- Colours: Red
- Championships: Paralympic Games medals: : 1: 1: 0 World Championship medals: : 1: 2: 0
- Parent group: China Administration of Sports for Persons with Disabilities

The China men's national goalball team is the men's national team of China. Goalball is a team sport designed specifically for athletes with vision impairment. It takes part in international competitions.

== Paralympic Games ==
=== 2008 Beijing ===
As the host nation, the team competed in the 2008 Summer Paralympics, from 6 to 17 September 2008, in the Beijing Institute of Technology Gymnasium 'bat wing' arena, Beijing, China. There were 12 men's teams and 8 women's teams taking part in this event. The team took gold.

=== 2012 London ===
The team competed in the 2012 Summer Paralympics from 30 August to 7 September 2012, in the Copper Box Arena, London, England. They came sixth.

The following is the China roster in the men's goalball tournament of the 2012 Summer Paralympics.

No.	Player	Age
1	Yao Yongquan	25
2	Cai Changgui	29
3	Bao Daolei	24
4	Chen Liangliang	28
6	Shao Shuai	25
7	Du Jinran	26

Team	Pld	W	D	L	GF	GA	GD	Pts	Qualification
Iran	5	4	0	1	32	20	+12	12	Quarterfinals
China	5	3	1	1	20	14	+6	10	Quarterfinals
Belgium	5	3	1	1	19	16	+3	10	Quarterfinals
Algeria	5	2	0	3	18	17	+1	6	Quarterfinals
South Korea	5	1	0	4	18	28	−10	3	Eliminated
Canada	5	1	0	4	16	28	−12	3	Eliminated

Source: "London 2012 Paralympic Games - Goalball results" (PDF). Paralympic.org. 3 October 2012 – via Goalball.sport.

30 August 2012; 13:45	China	5 – 9	Iran	Copper Box, London; Referees: Launel Scott (CAN), Bülent Kimyon (TUR)
30 August 2012; 13:45	Yao 3 Chen 2	Report	Sayahi 9	Copper Box, London; Referees: Launel Scott (CAN), Bülent Kimyon (TUR)

31 August 2012; 18:30	China	11 – 4	South Korea	Copper Box, London; Referees: Morten Hammershoi (DEN), Christl Daentler (GER)
31 August 2012; 18:30	Yao 6 Chen 5	Report	C-H Kim 2 N-O Kim 1 Hong 1	Copper Box, London; Referees: Morten Hammershoi (DEN), Christl Daentler (GER)

1 September 2012; 19:45	Algeria	0 – 1	China	Copper Box, London; Referees: Dina Murdie (GBR), Ali Aldarsony (KSA)
1 September 2012; 19:45		Report	Yao 1	Copper Box, London; Referees: Dina Murdie (GBR), Ali Aldarsony (KSA)

2 September 2012; 15:00	Belgium	0 – 0	China	Copper Box, London; Referees: Hooshang Shariati (IRI), Warrick Jackes (AUS)
2 September 2012; 15:00		Report		Copper Box, London; Referees: Hooshang Shariati (IRI), Warrick Jackes (AUS)

3 September 2012; 11:30	China	3 – 1	Canada	Copper Box, London; Referees: Ali Aldarsony (KSA), Christl Daentler (GER)
3 September 2012; 11:30	Chen 2 Yao 1	Report	Gaulin 1	Copper Box, London; Referees: Ali Aldarsony (KSA), Christl Daentler (GER)

Quarter-finals

5 September 2012; 18:00	China	4 – 12	Lithuania	Copper Box, London; Referees: Bülent Kimyon (TUR), Carla Da Matta (BRA)
5 September 2012; 18:00	Chen 2 Yongquan 2	Report	Zibolis 6 Juchna 4 Leonavičius 1 Pavliukianec 1	Copper Box, London; Referees: Bülent Kimyon (TUR), Carla Da Matta (BRA)

=== 2016 Rio de Janeiro ===
The team competed in the 2016 Summer Paralympics, with competition from Thursday, 8 September, to finals on Friday, 16 September 2016, in the temporary Future Arena, Rio de Janeiro, Brazil. They came seventh.

The following is the China roster in the men's goalball tournament of the 2016 Summer Paralympics.

No.	Player	Class	Date of birth (age)
1	Shao Shuai	B1	7 January 1987 (aged 29)
2	Cai Changgui	B1	15 April 1983 (aged 33)
3	Yang Mingyuan	B2	13 January 1998 (aged 18)
4	Chen Liangliang	B1	28 September 1984 (aged 31)
5	Hu Mingyao	B2	14 January 1995 (aged 21)
6	Yu Qinquan	B1	19 April 1996 (aged 20)

Pos	Team	Pld	W	D	L	GF	GA	GD	Pts	Qualification
1	Lithuania	4	4	0	0	35	22	+13	12	Quarter-finals
2	United States	4	2	0	2	21	18	+3	6	Quarter-finals
3	Turkey	4	2	0	2	20	23	−3	6	Quarter-finals
4	China	4	1	0	3	25	28	−3	3	Quarter-finals
5	Finland	4	1	0	3	24	34	−10	3	

Source: Paralympic.org

9 September 2016; 09:00	United States	5–2	China	Future Arena, Rio de Janeiro; Referees: Rudi Janssen (BEL), Raquel Aguado (ESP)
9 September 2016; 09:00	Hamilton 3 Kusku 2	Report	Cai 2	Future Arena, Rio de Janeiro; Referees: Rudi Janssen (BEL), Raquel Aguado (ESP)

11 September 2016; 13:15	China	10–3	Turkey	Future Arena, Rio de Janeiro; Referees: Vilma Basinkaite (LTU), Patricia Fras (SLO)
11 September 2016; 13:15	Chen 4 Cai 4 Hu 1 Shao 1	Report	Karakaya 2 Gündoğdu 1	Future Arena, Rio de Janeiro; Referees: Vilma Basinkaite (LTU), Patricia Fras (SLO)

12 September 2016; 14:15	Lithuania	3–1	China	Future Arena, Rio de Janeiro; Referees: Patricia Fras (SLO), Joelle Boulet (CAN)
12 September 2016; 14:15	Pavliukianec 2 Pazarauskas 1	Report	Chen 1	Future Arena, Rio de Janeiro; Referees: Patricia Fras (SLO), Joelle Boulet (CAN)

13 September 2016; 18:15	China	7–11	Finland	Future Arena, Rio de Janeiro; Referees: Joelle Boulet (CAN), Alexander Knecht (GER)
13 September 2016; 18:15	Yang 4 Chen 1 Hu 1 Cai 1	Report	Mattila 6 Miinala 5	Future Arena, Rio de Janeiro; Referees: Joelle Boulet (CAN), Alexander Knecht (GER)

Quarter-finals

14 September 2016; 09:00	Brazil	10–3	China	Future Arena, Rio de Janeiro; Referees: Yoshinori Nii (JPN), Rudi Janssen (BEL)
14 September 2016; 09:00	Moreno 8 Sousa 2	Report	Shao 2 Yang 1	Future Arena, Rio de Janeiro; Referees: Yoshinori Nii (JPN), Rudi Janssen (BEL)

=== 2020 Tokyo ===
The team competed in the 2020 Summer Paralympics, with competition from Wednesday, 25 August, to finals on Friday, 3 September 2021, in the Makuhari Messe arena, Chiba, Tokyo, Japan. The team was selected for Tokyo 2020 following the 2019 IBSA Asia Regional Championships.

The following is the China roster in the men's goalball tournament of the 2020 Summer Paralympics.

No.	Player	Class	Date of birth (age)
1	Lai Liangyu	B1	9 October 2000 (aged 20)
2	Cai Changgui	B1	15 April 1983 (aged 38)
3	Yang Mingyuan	B2	13 January 1998 (aged 23)
4	Chen Liangliang	B1	28 September 1984 (aged 36)
5	Hu Mingyao	B2	14 January 1995 (aged 26)
6	Yu Qinquan	B1	19 April 1996 (aged 25)

Pos	Team	Pld	W	D	L	GF	GA	GD	Pts	Qualification
1	Belgium	4	2	0	2	18	13	+5	6	Quarter-finals
2	Ukraine	4	2	0	2	18	15	+3	6	Quarter-finals
3	Turkey	4	2	0	2	15	15	0	6	Quarter-finals
4	China	4	2	0	2	21	22	−1	6	Quarter-finals
5	Germany	4	2	0	2	16	23	−7	6	

Source: TOCOG

Round-robin

26 August 2021; 09:00	Belgium	10−3	China	Makuhari Messe, Tokyo; Referees: Woradet Kultawongwattana (Thailand), Bas Spaans (Netherlands)
26 August 2021; 09:00	Mapreni 8 T. Vanhove 1 Amnir 1	Report	Yang Mingyuan 1 Hu Mingyao 1 Lai Liangyu 1	Makuhari Messe, Tokyo; Referees: Woradet Kultawongwattana (Thailand), Bas Spaans (Netherlands)

27 August 2021; 17:30	China	7–3	Ukraine	Makuhari Messe, Tokyo; Referees: Romualdas Vaitiekus (Lithuania), Warrick Jackes (Australia)
27 August 2021; 17:30	Chen Liangliang 3 Cai Changgui 2 Yang Mingyuan 2	Report	Zhyhalin 2 Oliinyk 1	Makuhari Messe, Tokyo; Referees: Romualdas Vaitiekus (Lithuania), Warrick Jackes (Australia)

28 August 2021; 10:30	Turkey	6–3	China	Makuhari Messe, Tokyo; Referees: Svitlana Moroz (Ukraine), Yoshinori Nii (Japan)
28 August 2021; 10:30	Kara 3 Karakaya 3	Report	Yang Mingyuan 2 Cai Changgui 1	Makuhari Messe, Tokyo; Referees: Svitlana Moroz (Ukraine), Yoshinori Nii (Japan)

30 August 2021; 17:30	China	8–3	Germany	Makuhari Messe, Tokyo; Referees: Reza Dehghan (Iran), Romualdas Vaitiekus (Lithuania)
30 August 2021; 17:30	Yang Mingyuan 7 Hu Mingyao 1	Report	Dennis 2 Tiede 1	Makuhari Messe, Tokyo; Referees: Reza Dehghan (Iran), Romualdas Vaitiekus (Lithuania)

== World Championships ==
=== 2006 Spartanburg ===
The team competed in the 2006 World Championships, in July 2006, in Spartanburg, South Carolina, United States of America.

=== 2010 Sheffield ===
The team competed in the 2010 World Championships, from 20 to 25 June 2010, in Sheffield, England, in Pool A.

=== 2014 Espoo ===
The team competed in the 2014 World Championships from 30 June to 5 July 2014, in Espoo, Finland. In Pool B, they made the quarter-finals, but were defeated by Finland 2:5.

=== 2018 Malmö ===
The team competed in the 2018 World Championships from 3 to 8 June 2018, in Baltiska Hallen, Malmö, Sweden. They placed third in Pool A, but lost to Germany 0:8 in the quarter-finals, to place seventh in the final standings.

=== 2022 Matosinhos ===
The team competed in the 2022 World Championships from 7 to 16 December 2022, at the Centro de Desportos e Congressos de Matosinhos, Portugal. There were sixteen men's and sixteen women's teams. They placed first in Pool D, winning all seven games, and second overall to Brazil in the final standings.

China, together with Brazil, secured berths for the 2024 Summer Paralympics, Paris, France.

== IBSA World Games ==
=== 2015 Seoul ===
The team competed in the 2015 IBSA World Games from 10 to 17 May 2015, in Seoul, South Korea. They were beaten by Lithuania, 3:10 in the gold medal match, to take silver.

== Regional championships ==
The team competed in IBSA Asia goalball region, and from January 2010 became part of the IBSA Asia-Pacific goalball competition region.

=== 2013 Beijing ===
The team competed in the 2013 IBSA Asia Pacific Goalball Regional Championships, from 11 to 16 November 2013, in Beijing, China. Of the six men's teams (Australia, China, Iran, Japan, Mongolia, Thailand), China beat Australia 10:1, to take the bronze medal.

=== 2015 Hangzhou ===
The team competed in the 2015 IBSA Asia Pacific Goalball Regional Championships, from 8 to 12 November 2015, in the China National Goalball Training Centre, Hangzhou, China. Of the five men's teams (Australia, China, Iran, Japan, Korea), the team took the gold medal.

=== 2017 Bangkok ===
The team competed in the 2017 IBSA Asia/Pacific Goalball Regional Championships, from Monday 21 to Saturday 26 August 2017, in the Thai-Japan Sports Stadium, Din Daeng, Bangkok, Thailand. Competing in Pool A, they came third, going onto mercy South Korea 11:1 in the quarter-finals, beating Australia 7:3 in the semi-finals, and finally beating Iran 10:2, to take the gold medal.

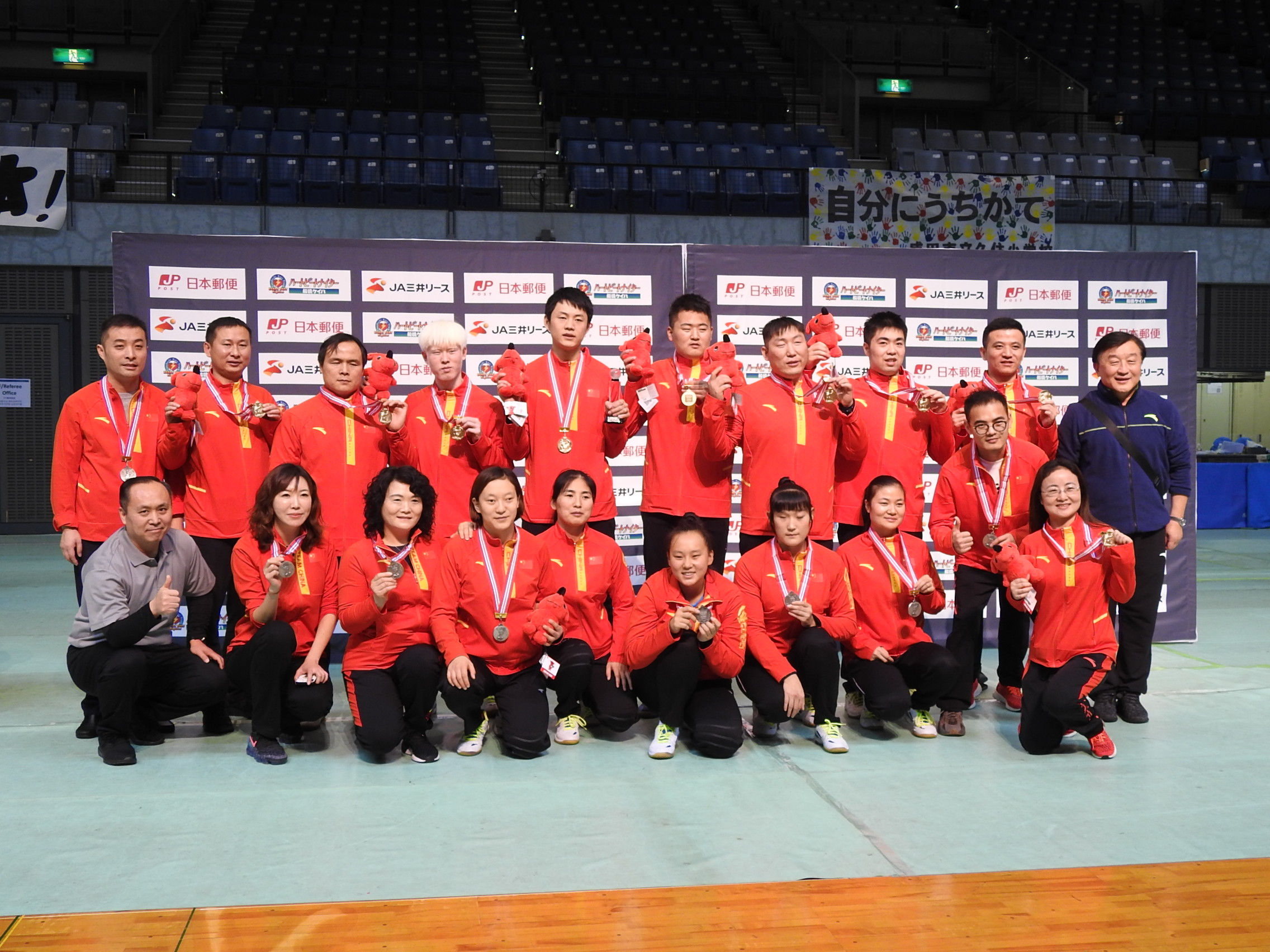
China men and women's goalball teams with medals (Dec 2019).

=== 2019 Chiba ===
The team competed in the 2019 IBSA Goalball Asia-Pacific Regional Championships, from Thursday 5 to Tuesday 10 December 2019, in the Chiba Port Arena, Chiba, Japan. They placed first in Pool A in the round-robin, and took the gold medal.

== See also ==
- Disabled sports
- China women's national goalball team
- China at the Paralympics
