= Canada women's national goalball team =

Canadian national team, for the Paralympic sport of goalball

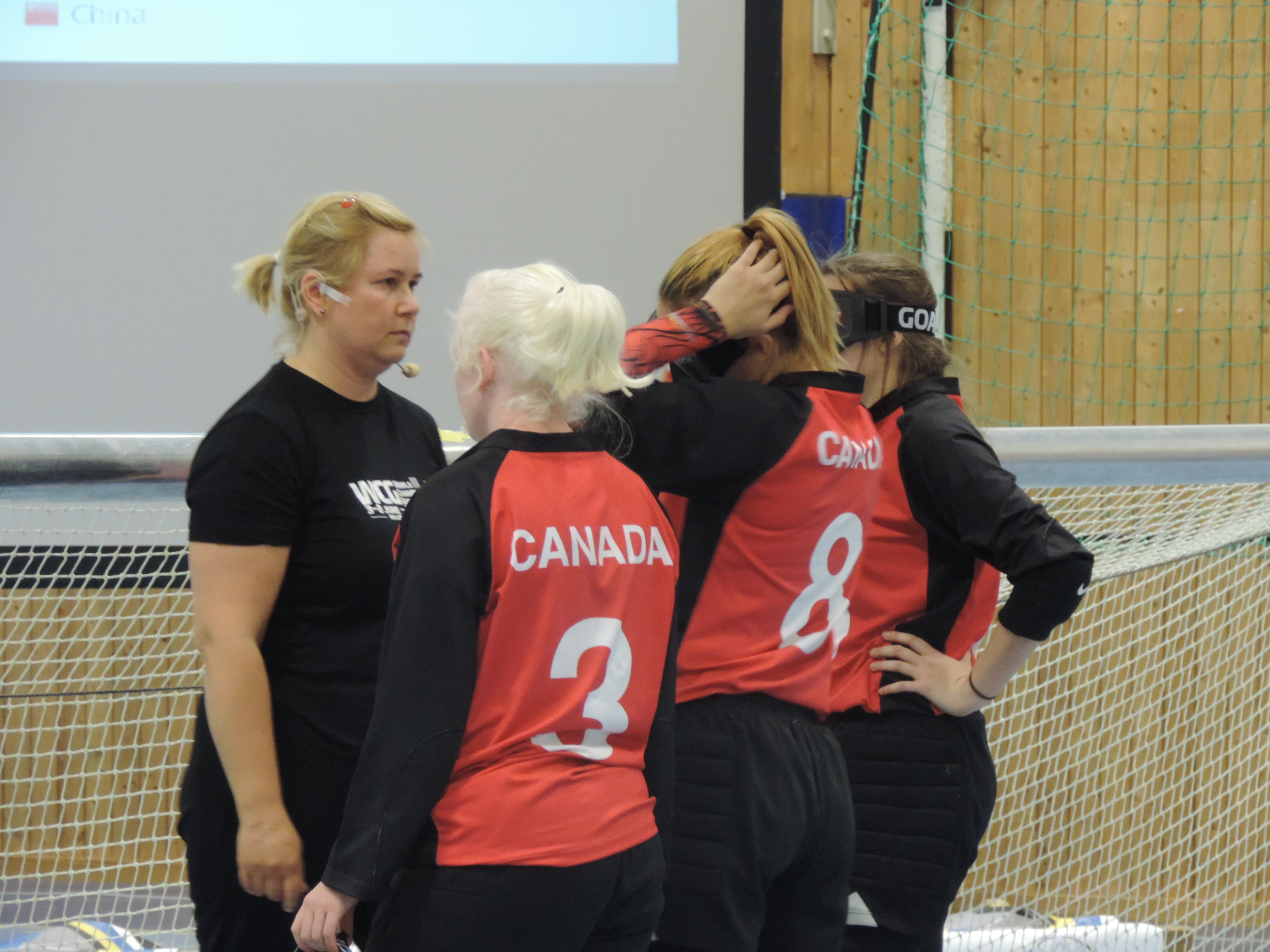
- Eyeshades being checked at the game start, World Goalball Championships, Malmö, Sweden (2018).
- Sport: Goalball
- League: IBSA
- Division: Women
- Region: IBSA America
- Location: Canada
- Colours: Red, Black, White
- Head coach: Trent Farebrother; Darren Hamilton
- Championships: Paralympic Games medals: : 2: 1: 2 World Championship medals: : 1: 1: 1
- Parent group: Canadian Blind Sports Association; Canadian Paralympic Committee
- Website: canadianblindsports.ca

Canada women's national goalball team is the women's national team of Canada. Goalball is a team sport designed specifically for athletes with a vision impairment. The team takes part in international goalball competitions.

== Paralympic Games ==
=== 1984 New York ===
The team competed at the 1984 Summer Paralympics, where they finished second.

=== 1988 Seoul ===
The team competed in the 1988 Summer Paralympics, from 15 to 24 October 1988, in Seoul, South Korea. They finished third.

=== 1992 Barcelona ===
The team competed at the 1992 Summer Paralympics from 3 to 14 September 1992, in the Pavelló de la Vall d'Hebron indoor stadium, Barcelona, Spain, where they finished third.

=== 2000 Sydney ===
The team competed at the 2000 Summer Paralympics, between 18 and 29 October 2000, at an Olympic Park indoor hall, Sydney, New South Wales, Australia, where they finished first.

Athletes were: Amy Alsop, Carrie Anton, Nathalie Chartrand, Viviane Forest, Nancy Morin, and Contessa Scott. The team finished first.

=== 2004 Athens ===
The team competed in 2004 Summer Paralympics, between 17 and 28 September 2004, in the Faliro Sports Pavilion Arena, Athens, Greece. Athletes were: Amy Alsop, Viviane Forest, Kelley Hannett, Annette Lisabeth, Nancy Morin, and Contessa Scott. The team finished first.

=== 2008 Beijing ===
The team competed in 2008 Summer Paralympics, from 6 to 17 September 2008, in the Beijing Institute of Technology Gymnasium 'bat wing' arena, Beijing, China. Athletes were: Amy Alsop, Amy Kneebone, Annette Lisabeth, Nancy Morin, Shawna Ryan, Contessa Scott. Whilst drawing or winning during the round robin component, the team did not make the semi-finals.

=== 2012 London ===
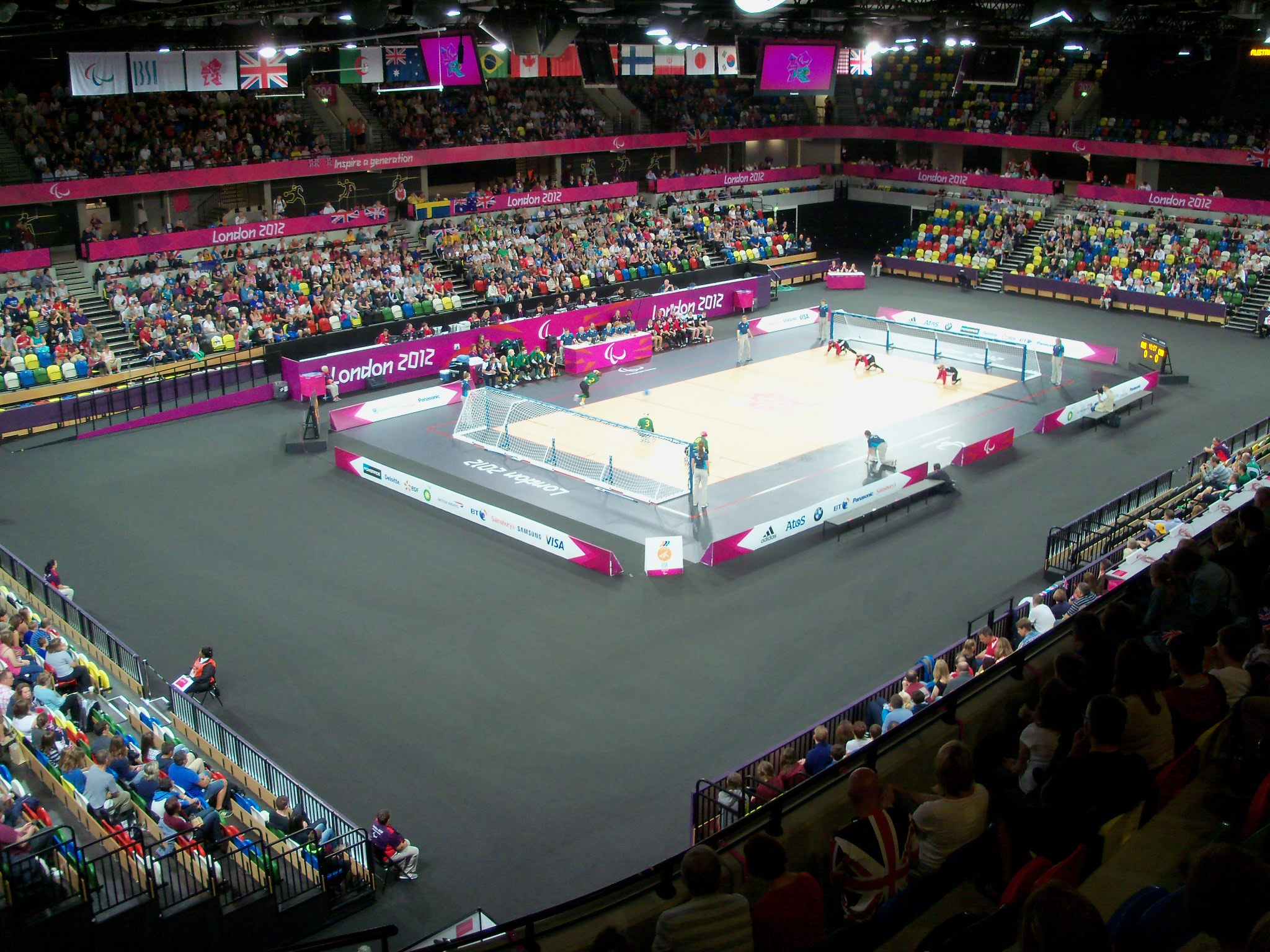
Australia goalball women throwing to Canada women (September 2012).

The team competed in the 2012 Summer Paralympics from 30 August to 7 September 2012, in the Copper Box Arena, London, England. In Group B, the team made the quarter-finals, losing to Finland, 1:2.

Athletes were Ashlie Andrews, Whitney Bogart, Amy Kneebone, Jill MacSween, Nancy Morin, and Cassie Orgeles.

The following is the Canada roster in the women's goalball tournament of the 2012 Summer Paralympics.

No.	Player	Age
2	Cassie Orgeles	22
3	Whitney Bogart	26
4	Ashlie Andrews	19
6	Jill MacSween	20
7	Amy Kneebone	22
9	Nancy Morin	37

1 September 2012; 13:45	Canada	1 – 2	Sweden	Copper Box, London; Referees: Bulent Kimyor (TUR), Thomas Bärz (GER)
1 September 2012; 13:45	Kneebone 1	Report	Gustavsson 2	Copper Box, London; Referees: Bulent Kimyor (TUR), Thomas Bärz (GER)

2 September 2012; 10:15	Australia	1 – 3	Canada	Copper Box, London; Referees: Juha Vuokila (FIN), Dina Murdie (GBR)
2 September 2012; 10:15	Christensen 1	Report	Kneebone 2 Morin 1	Copper Box, London; Referees: Juha Vuokila (FIN), Dina Murdie (GBR)

3 September 2012; 19:45	Japan	0 – 1	Canada	Copper Box, London

4 September 2012; 13:45	Canada	1 – 0	United States	Copper Box, London

Semi-final

5 September 2012; 14:15	Canada	1 – 2	Finland	Copper Box, London

=== 2016 Rio de Janeiro ===
The team competed in 2016 Summer Paralympics, with competition from Thursday 8 September to finals on Friday 16 September 2016, in the temporary Future Arena, Rio de Janeiro, Brazil. They came sixth.

The following is the Canada roster in the women's goalball tournament of the 2016 Summer Paralympics.

No.	Player	Class	Date of birth (age)
3	Whitney Bogart	B3	April 21, 1986 (aged 30)
4	Ashlie Marie Andrews	B3	January 4, 1993 (aged 23)
6	Jillian Macsween	B3	June 2, 1992 (aged 24)
7	Amy Burk	B3	March 17, 1990 (aged 26)
8	Meghan Mahon	B2	January 15, 1996 (aged 20)
9	Nancy Morin	B2	August 28, 1975 (aged 41)

9 September 2016; 10:15	Turkey	12–4	Canada	Future Arena, Rio de Janeiro; Referees: Raili Sipura (FIN), Alexander Knecht (GER)
9 September 2016; 10:15	Altunoluk 8 Özcan 2 Mercan 2	Report	Burk 4	Future Arena, Rio de Janeiro; Referees: Raili Sipura (FIN), Alexander Knecht (GER)

11 September 2016; 14:30	Canada	3–2	Ukraine	Future Arena, Rio de Janeiro; Referees: Raquel Aguado (ESP), Daniel Voltan (BRA)
11 September 2016; 14:30	Burk 2 Bogart 1	Report	Rud 2	Future Arena, Rio de Janeiro; Referees: Raquel Aguado (ESP), Daniel Voltan (BRA)

12 September 2016; 18:15	China	8–3	Canada	Future Arena, Rio de Janeiro; Referees: Vilma Basinkaite (LTU), Yoshinori Nii (JPN)
12 September 2016; 18:15	Zhang W. 7 Ju 1	Report	Andrews 2 Morin 1	Future Arena, Rio de Janeiro; Referees: Vilma Basinkaite (LTU), Yoshinori Nii (JPN)

13 September 2016; 15:30	Canada	6–0	Australia	Future Arena, Rio de Janeiro; Referees: Daniel Voltan (BRA), Raili Sipura (FIN)
13 September 2016; 15:30	Burk 6	Report		Future Arena, Rio de Janeiro; Referees: Daniel Voltan (BRA), Raili Sipura (FIN)

Quarter-final

14 September 2016; 19:30	United States	2–0	Canada	Future Arena, Rio de Janeiro; Referees: Vilma Basinkaite (LTU), Daniel Voltan (BRA)
14 September 2016; 19:30	Armbruster 2	Report		Future Arena, Rio de Janeiro; Referees: Vilma Basinkaite (LTU), Daniel Voltan (BRA)

=== 2020 Tokyo ===
The team competed in the 2020 Summer Paralympics, with competition from Wednesday 25 August to finals on Friday 3 September 2021, in the Makuhari Messe arena, Chiba, Tokyo, Japan. The women's team qualified at the 2019 Parapan American Games.

The following is the Canada roster in the women's goalball tournament of the 2020 Summer Paralympics.

No.	Player	Class	Date of birth (age)
1	Maryam Salehizadeh	B2	September 21, 1986 (aged 34)
3	Whitney Bogart	B3	April 21, 1986 (aged 35)
4	Meghan Mahon	B3	January 15, 1996 (aged 25)
5	Emma Reinke	B3	June 22, 1998 (aged 23)
6	Brieann Baldock	B3	December 14, 1995 (aged 25)
7	Amy Burk	B3	March 17, 1990 (aged 31)

Pos	Team	Pld	W	D	L	GF	GA	GD	Pts	Qualification
1	China	4	3	0	1	17	7	+10	9	Quarterfinals
2	Israel	4	2	0	2	22	14	+8	6	Quarterfinals
3	RPC	4	2	0	2	13	16	−3	6	Quarterfinals
4	Australia	4	2	0	2	9	21	−12	6	Quarterfinals
5	Canada	4	1	0	3	12	15	−3	3	

Source: TOCOG
Rules for classification: 1) points; 2) goal difference; 3) number of wins; 4) goals against; 5) head-to-head goal difference.

Round-robin

25 August 2021
10:30

RPC	5–1	Canada
Gerasimova 1'; Arestova 2', 9', 16'; Chudina 23'	Report	Reinke 23'

Makuhari Messe, Tokyo
Referee: Vaida Pokvytytė (Lithuania), Yoshinori Nii (Japan)

26 August 2021
20:30

Canada	6–2	Israel
Reinke 9', 13', 14', 16'; Salehizadeh 18', 22'	Report	Mizrahi 18'; Ben-David 23'

Makuhari Messe, Tokyo
Referee: Bas Spaans (Netherlands), Romualdas Vaitiekus (Lithuania)

28 August 2021
09:00

Canada	3–4	Australia
Salehizadeh 16'; Reinke 24', 24'	Report	Horsburgh 12', 18', 19', 23'

Makuhari Messe, Tokyo
Referee: Raili Sipura (Finland), Reza Dehghan (Iran)

30 August 2021
14:45

China	4–2	Canada
Chen Fengqing 2'; Zhang Xiling 3', 4', 22'	Report	Reinke 16'; Burk 18'

Makuhari Messe, Tokyo
Referee: Vaida Pokvytytė (Lithuania), Raili Sipura (Finland)

== World Championships ==
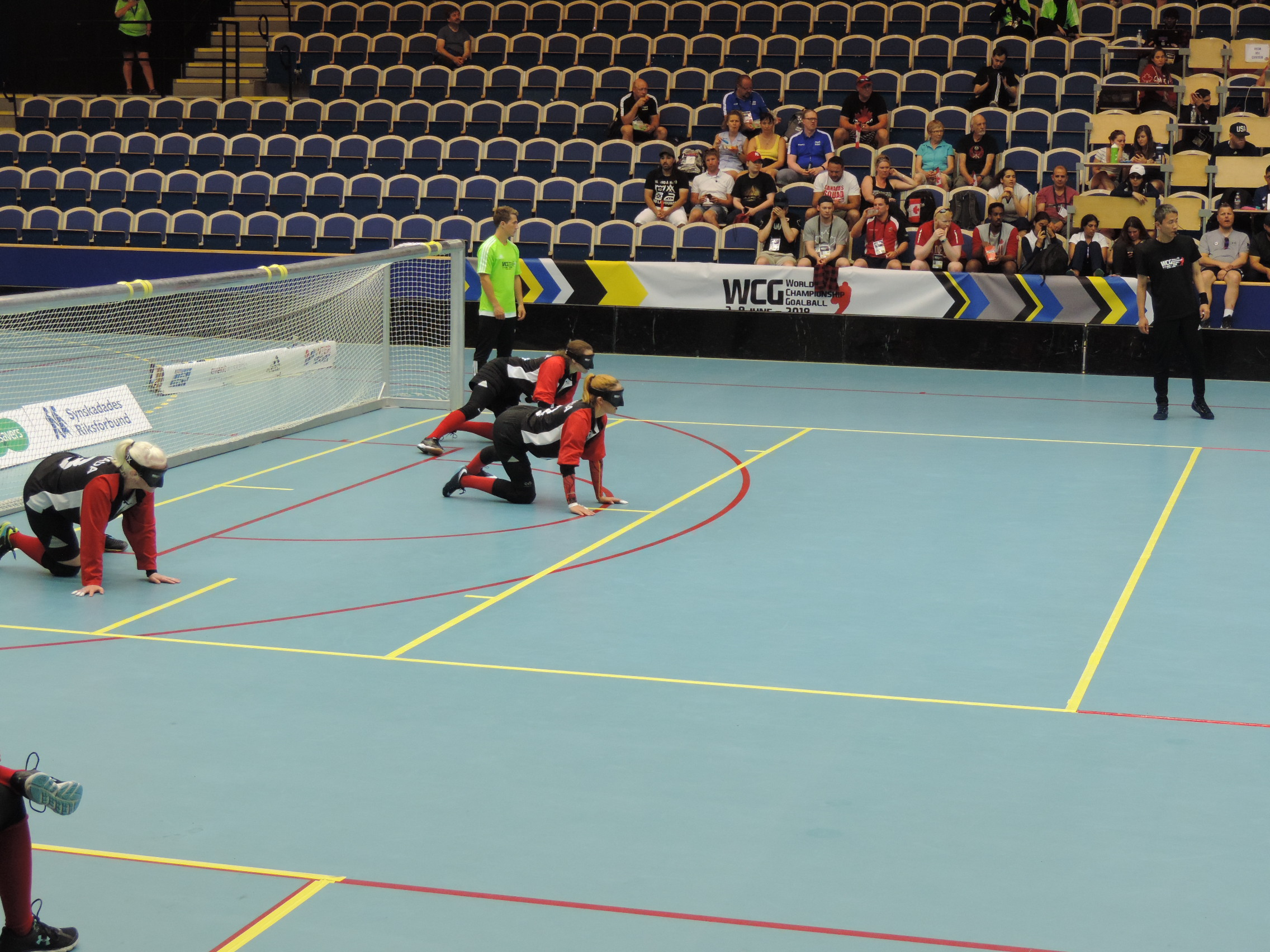
Canadian women's goalball team defending in readiness of the Brazilian team. World Goalball Championships, Malmö, Sweden (2018).

IBSA World Goalball Championships have been held every four years from 1978. Placing first, second or third in the tournament ensures a berth in the Paralympic Games goalball tournaments.

=== 1982 Indianapolis ===
The team competed in the 1982 World Championships, in Butler University in Indianapolis, Indiana, United States of America. The team was one of six teams participating, and they finished third overall.

=== 1986 Roermond ===
The 1986 IBSA World Goalball Championships were held in Roermond, the Netherlands. The team was one of ten teams participating, and they finished sixth overall.

=== 1990 Calgary ===
The team competed in the 1990 World Championships, in Calgary, Alberta, Canada. The team was one of seven teams participating, and they finished sixth overall.

=== 1994 Colorado Springs ===
The team competed in the 1994 World Championships, in Colorado Springs, Colorado, United States of America. The team was one of nine teams participating, and they finished fifth overall.

=== 1998 Madrid ===
The team competed in the 1998 World Championships, in Madrid, Spain. The team was one of eleven teams participating, and they finished ninth overall.

=== 2002 Rio de Janeiro ===
The team competed in the 2002 World Championships, in Rio de Janeiro, Brazil, from 30 August 2002 to 8 September 2002. The team was one of ten teams participating, and they finished second overall.

=== 2006 Spartanburg ===
The team competed in the 2006 World Championships, in July 2006, in Spartanburg, South Carolina, United States of America.

=== 2010 Sheffield ===
The team competed in the 2010 World Championships, from 20 to 25 June 2010, in Sheffield, England, in Pool X.

=== 2014 Espoo ===
The team did not compete in the 2014 World Championships from 30 June to 5 July 2014, in Espoo, Finland.

=== 2018 Malmö ===
Athletes for the 2018 World Championships are: Whitney Bogart (Ottawa, Ontario), Meghan Mahon (Sudbury, Ontario), Nancy Morin (Longueuil, Quebec), Emma Reinke (Saint Thomas, Ontario), Ruby Soliman (Lethbridge, Alberta). Reserve is Brieann Baldock (Edmonton, Alberta). Coming second in Pool D, they beat Japan 3:2 to progress to the semi-finals, where they were defeated by Russia 5:11, taking fourth place overall.

=== 2022 Matosinhos ===
The team competed in the 2022 World Championships from 7 to 16 December 2022, at the Centro de Desportos e Congressos de Matosinhos, Portugal. There were sixteen men's and sixteen women's teams. They placed first in Pool A, and third in final standings.

== IBSA World Games ==
=== 2015 Seoul ===
The team competed in the 2015 IBSA World Games from 10 to 17 May 2015, in Seoul, South Korea. They placed third to China and Israel.

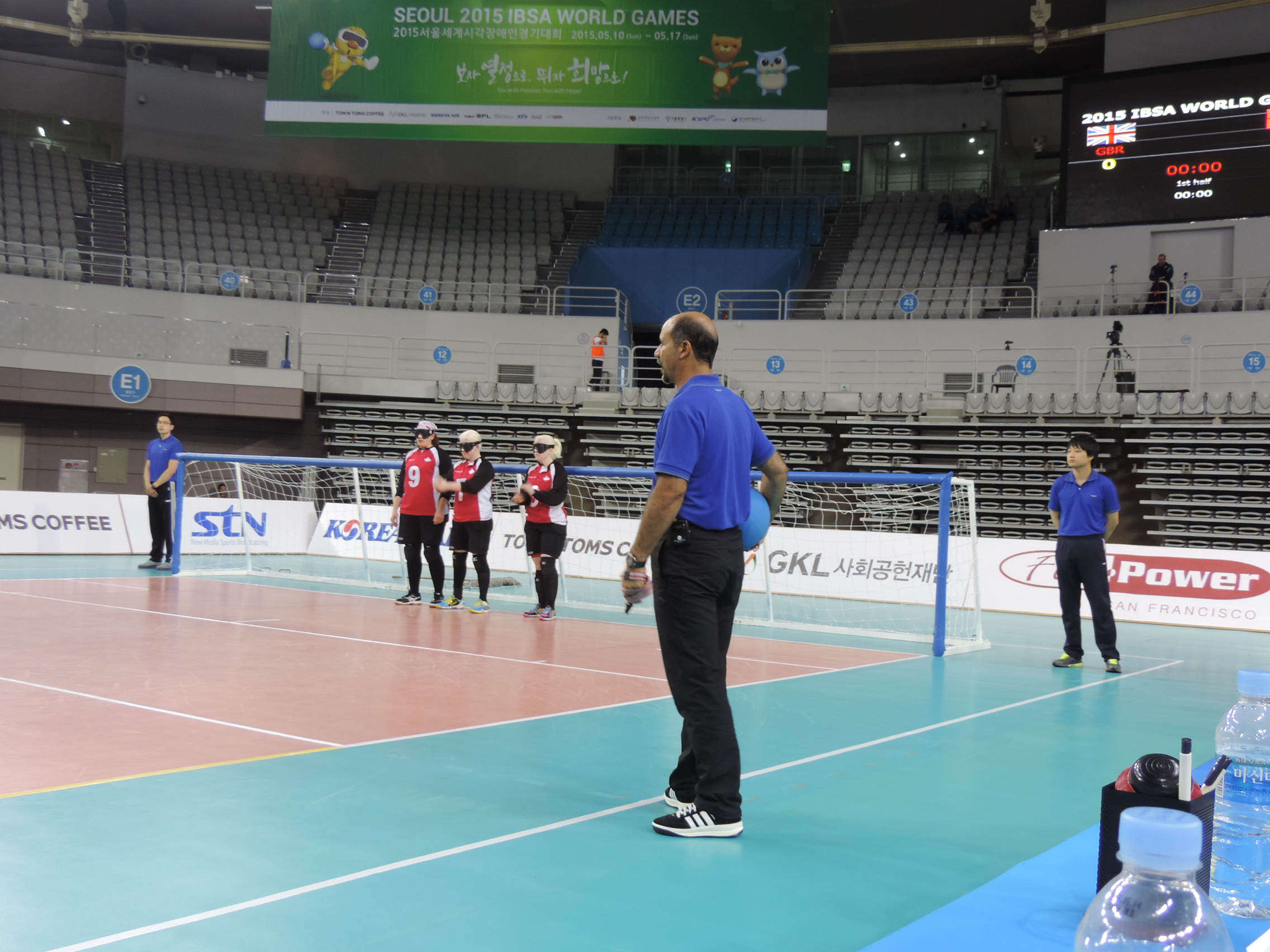
Preparing for the start of half (May 2015).

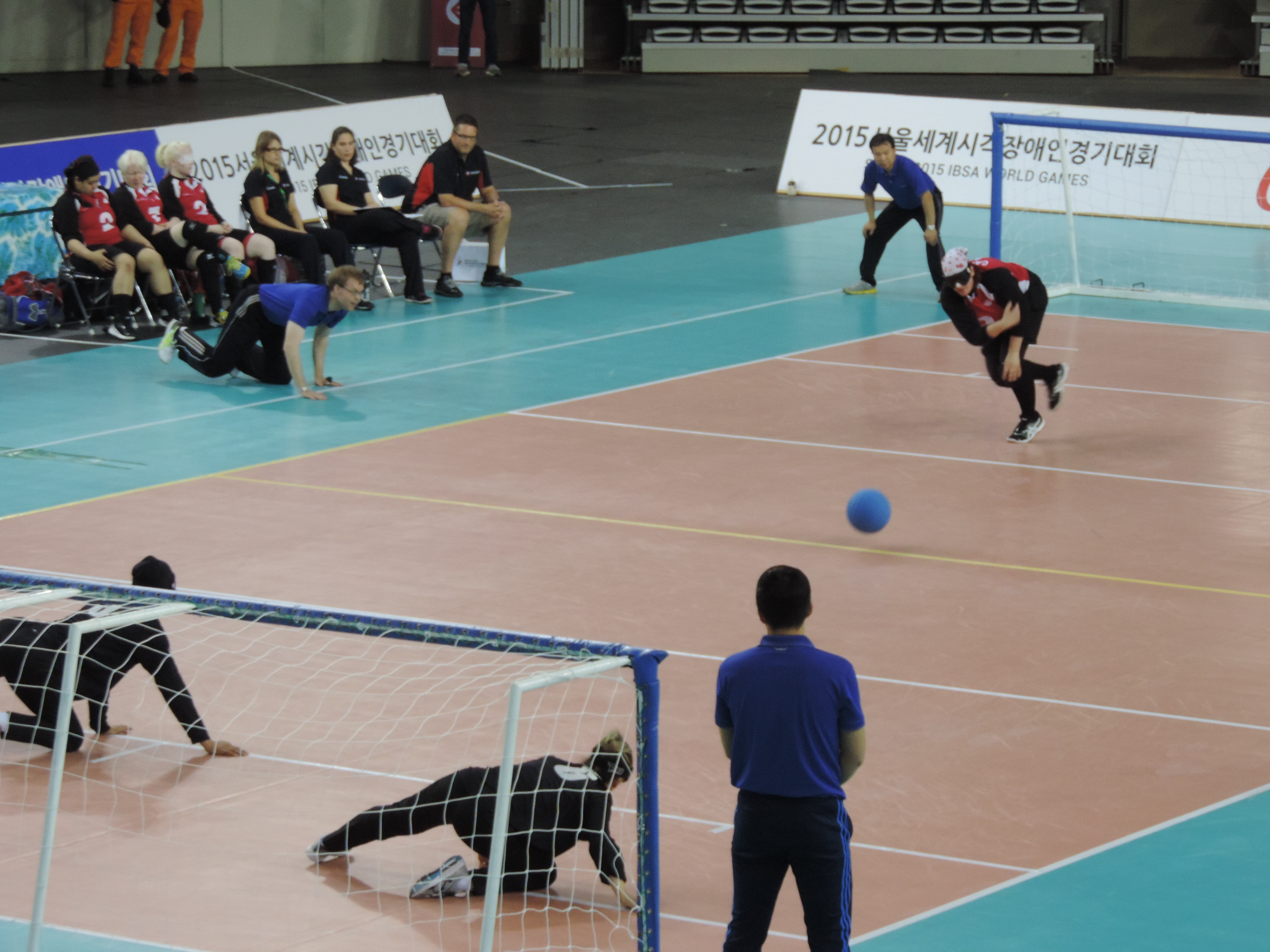
Throwing towards Algeria women (May 2015).

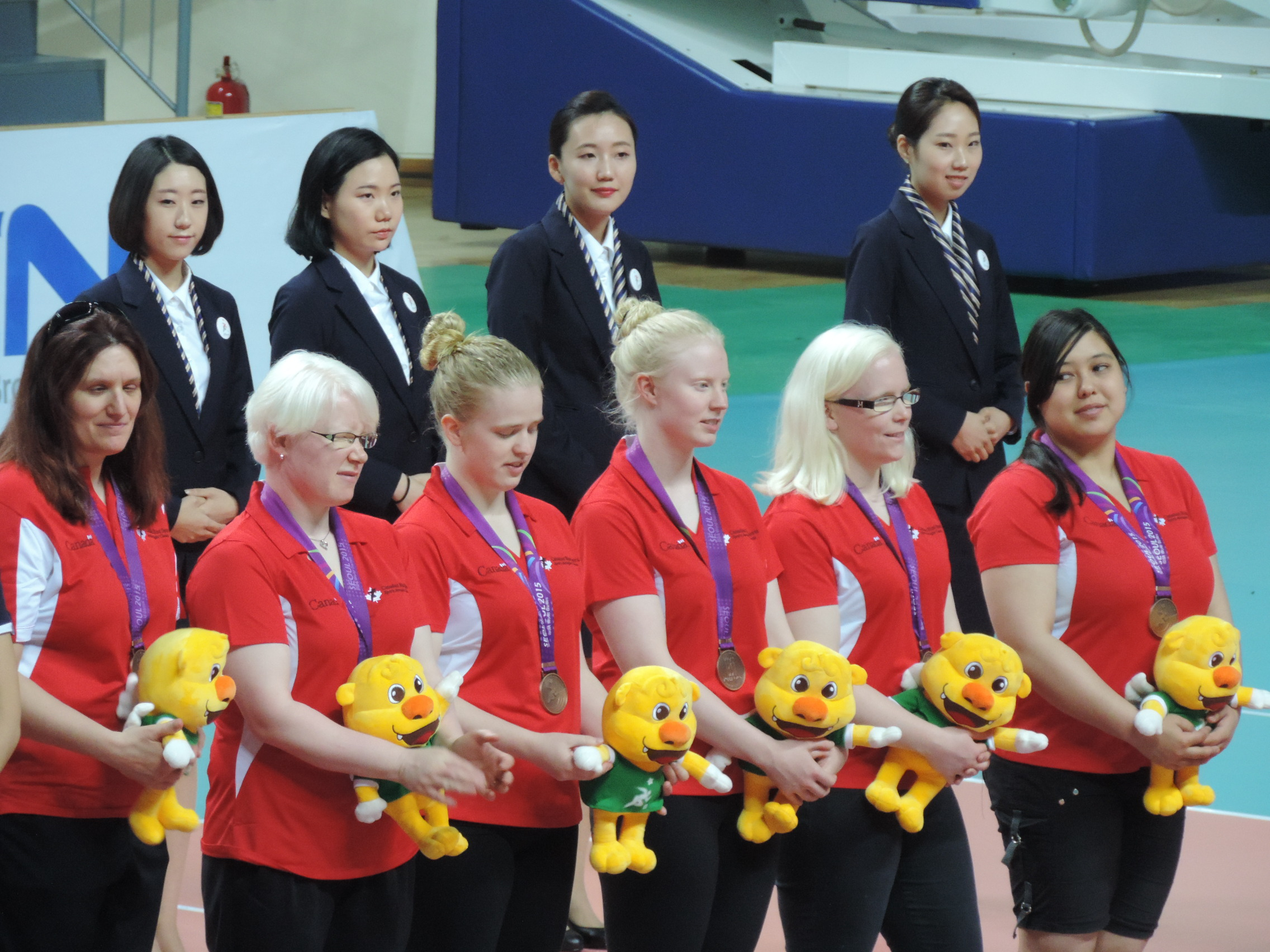
Presented with bronze medal, and Games mascot (May 2015).

== Regional championships ==
The team competes in the IBSA America goalball region. The winner of the championships usually qualifies for a berth at the World Championships or the Paralympic Games.

=== 2005 São Paulo ===
The team competed at the 2005 IBSA Goalball Americas Regional Championships which were part of the Fourth IBSA Pan-American Games, the competition being from Monday 5 September 2005 to Friday 9 September 2005, in São Paulo, Brazil. Athletes included Whitney Burk, Nancy Moran, and Contessa Scott.

There were three women's teams competing, with Brazil finished first, with USA second and Canada third.

=== 2011 Guadalajara ===
The team competed at the 2011 Parapan American Games from 13 to 19 November 2011, at the San Rafael Gymnasium in Guadalajara, Mexico. There were five women's teams: Brazil, Canada, El Salvador, Mexico, USA. Athletes were: Ashlie Andrews, Whitney Bogart, Amy Kneebone, Jillian MacSween, Nancy Morin, and Cassandra Orgeles.

Canada came third behind Brazil and USA.

=== 2013 Colorado Springs ===
The team competed at the 2013 Parapan American Games (which also hosted the 2013 IBSA World Youth Championships) from 11 to 14 July 2013, at Colorado Springs, Colorado, USA.

Of the three women's teams, Canada came third to Brazil and USA.

=== 2015 Toronto ===
The team competed at the 2015 Parapan American Games from 8 August 2015 to 15 August 2015, at the Mississauga Sports Centre, Toronto, Ontario, Canada. There were six women's teams: Brazil, Canada, El Salvador, Guatemala, Nicaragua, USA. Athletes were: Ashlie Andrews, Whitney Bogart, Tiana Knight, Jill Macsween, Nancy Morin, and Cassie Orgeles.

Canada came third, giving mercy to Guatemala, behind USA and Brazil.

=== 2017 São Paulo ===
The team competed at the 2017 IBSA Goalball Americas Championships from Wednesday 29 November 2017 to Sunday 3 December 2017, at São Paulo, Brazil. There were six women's teams: Brazil, Canada, Costa Rica, Mexico, Peru, USA.

Canada beat USA to take gold.

=== 2019 Lima ===
The team competed at the 2019 Parapan American Games from 23 August 2019 to 1 September 2019, at the Miguel Grau Coliseum, Lima, Peru. This championships was a qualifier for the 2020 Paralympic Games. There were six women's teams: Brazil, Canada, Costa Rica, Mexico, Peru, USA.

Canada came third behind USA and Brazil.

=== 2022 São Paulo ===
Due to the ongoing COVID-19 pandemic, the IBSA America championships moved from 6 to 13 November 2021, to 18 to 22 February 2022. The event is being held at the Centro de Treinamento Paralímpico (Paralympic Training Center) in São Paulo. This championships is a qualifier for the 2022 World Championships.

There are twelve women's teams: Argentina, Brazil, Canada, Chile, Colombia, Costa Rica, Guatemala, Mexico, Nicaragua, Peru, USA, Venezuela.

The team composes of Amy Burk (Ontario), Brie Baldock (Alberta), Emma Reinke (Ontario), Maryam Salehizadeh (British Columbia), Meghan Mahon (Alberta), Whitney Bogart (Ontario), and Darren Hamilton (coach), Meghan Buttle (physiotherapist), and Stephen Burke (team manager).

== IBSA Pan-American Games ==
=== 2009 Colorado Springs ===
The 2009 IBSA Pan American Games and IBSA World Youth and Student Championships were held in Colorado Springs, Colorado, United States of America. Canada fielded a women's team of: Whitney Burk (Ottawa, ON), Amy Kneebone (Charlottetown, PEI), Annette Lisabeth (Langton, ON), Shawn Marsolais (New Westminster, BC), and Nancy Morin (Longueuil, QC). Coaches were Janice Dawson (Calgary, AB) and Annie Pouliot (Quebec, QC), with physiotherapist Marie-Claire Holland (Ottawa, ON).

== Competitive history ==
- 2000 Paralympic Games. Gold.
- 2004 Paralympic Games. Gold.

The table below contains individual game results for the team in international matches and competitions.

Year	Event	Opponent	Date	Venue	Team	Team	Winner	Ref
2005	IBSA Pan-American Games	Brazil	5 September	São Paulo	3	1	Brazil	
2005	IBSA Pan-American Games	United States	6 September	São Paulo	2	1	United States	
2005	IBSA Pan-American Games	United States	7 September	São Paulo	3	3		
2005	IBSA Pan-American Games	Brazil	7 September	São Paulo	1	1		
2005	IBSA Pan-American Games	United States	8 September	São Paulo	6	7	Canada	

=== Goal scoring by competition ===
Player	Goals	Competition	Notes	Ref
Nancy Moran	3	2005 IBSA Pan-American Games		
Whitney Burk	2	2005 IBSA Pan-American Games		
Contessa Scott	2	2005 IBSA Pan-American Games		

== See also ==
- Canada men's national goalball team
- Canada at the Paralympics
- Goalball at the Summer Paralympic Games
