= Naoi =

Naoi (written: 直井) is a Japanese surname. Notable people with the surname include:

- Yuka Naoi (直井 由香, born 1963), Japanese goalball player
- Yuki Naoi (直井 由紀, born 1963), Japanese goalball player
- Naoi Rei (直井 怜, born 2004), member of the K-pop group IVE.
