= Goalball at the 2008 Summer Paralympics =

Goalball at the XIII Paralympic Games
- Paralympic Goalball
- Venue: Beijing Institute of Technology Gymnasium
- Dates: 7–14 September 2008

Goalball at the 2008 Summer Paralympics was held in the Beijing Institute of Technology Gymnasium from September 7 to September 14. The competition consisted of men's and women's team events, and what had been billed as one of the most open tournaments certainly lived up to expectations.

In the women's gold medal game, the lead changed hands five times, with the USA outlasting China by a score of 6–5, with never more than one goal in it. The winning goal came from Asya Miller with less than a minute to go.

The gold medal in the men's game was even more dramatic. Lithuania, the current world champions, took advantage of a clutch of penalties in the first half to jump ahead of China by 6 goals to 2 at the half, and looked to be holding on despite a steady comeback. With only 50 seconds on the clock, the Chinese were two goals behind (6–8) but managed to overturn the deficit with three goals in 30 seconds to take the gold 9–8, sending the packed BIT Gymnasium into rapture.

== Medalists ==
| Event | Gold | Silver | Bronze |
|---|---|---|---|
| Men | China (CHN); Bao Daolei; Cai Changgui; Chen Liangliang; Du Jinran; Yang Chunhong; Yao Yongquan | Lithuania (LTU); Arvydas Juchna; Saulius Leonavicius; Nerijus Montvydas; Genrik Pavliukianec; Zydrunas Simkus; Marius Zibolis | Sweden (SWE); Mikael Akerberg; Jimmy Bjorkstrand; Stefan Gahne; Niklas Hultqvist; Oskar Kuus; Fatmir Seremeti |
| Women | United States (USA); Jen Armbruster; Lisa Banta; Jackie Barnes; Jessie Lorenz; Asya Miller; Robin Theryoung | China (CHN); Chen Fengqing; Fan Feifei; Lin Shan; Wang Ruixue; Wang Shasha; Xu Juan | Denmark (DEN); Karina Jørgensen; Maria Larsen; Mette Nissen; Kamilla Ryding; Ninna Thomsen; Lykke Vedsted |

== Classification ==
Players are given a classification depending on the type and extent of their disability. Visually impaired athletes in classes B1 through B3 can take part in goalball. Partially sighted players wear blindfolds so that they compete on equal terms with blind players.

== Participating teams ==
There were 12 men's teams and 8 women's teams taking part in this sport.

=== Men's ===
| Slovenia; Gorazd Dolanc; Matej Ledinek; Dejan Pirc; Simon Podobnikar; Ivan Vinkler; Bostjan Vogrincic | Lithuania; Arvydas Juchna; Saulius Leonavicius; Nerijus Montvydas; Genrik Pavliukianec; Zydrunas Simkus; Marius Zibolis | Denmark; Mads Brix Baulund; Jonas Elkjaer; Peter Troels Hahnemann Weichel; Kenneth Hansen; Ricky Nielsen; Martin Pedersen | Spain; Vicente Galiana; Jose Fernando Garcia; Raul Garcia; Jose Perez; Tomas Rubio; Jesus Nazaret Santana Guillen |
| Finland; Veli-Matti Aittola; Toni Alenius; Jorma Kivinen; Jarno Mattila; Erkki Ilmari Miinala; Petri Kalevi Posio | Belgium; Youssef Bihi; Vincent Buisseret; Johann Cyriel G. de Rick; Bruno Jan Vanhove; Danny van Eenooghe; Peter van Hout | China; Bao Dao Lei; Cai Changgui; Chen Liang Liang; Du Jinran; Yao Yongquan; Yang Chunhong | Canada; Mario Caron; Jeff Christy; Rob Christy; Bruno Hache; Dean Kozak |
| Sweden; Mikael Bo Akerberg; Jimmy Bjorkstrand; Stefan Ingvar Gahne; Niklas Glenn Hultqvist; Oskar Kuus; Fatmir Seremeti | Brazil; Alexsander Celente; Thiago Henrique Firmino da Costa; Legy Freire; Paulo Homem; Romário Marques; Luiz Silva Filho | Iran; Seyed Rahmatollah Hosseini Moghadamkari; Behzad Jahangiri Ghavam; Javad Jalali; Mohsen Jalilvandshirkhanitabar; Seyed Mehdi Sayahi; Mohammad Soranji Estarki | United States; Steve Denuyl; Chris Dodds; Tyler Merren; Donte Mickens; Edward Munro; Daryl Walker |

=== Women's ===
| China; Chen Fengqing; Fan Feifei; Lin Shan; Wang Ruixue; Wang Shasha; Xu Juan | United States; Jen Armbruster; Lisa Banta; Jackie Barnes; Jessie Lorenz; Asya Miller | Denmark; Kamilla Brady Ryding; Karina Jørgensen; Maria Larsen; Mette Praestegaard Nissen; Ninna Thomsen; Likke Vilstrup Vedsted | Canada; Amy Alsop; Amy Kneebone; Annette Lisabeth; Nancy Morin; Shawna Ryan; Contessa Scott |
| Sweden; Asa Alverstedt; Malin Gustavsson; Josefine Jalmestal; Maria Juliusson; Sofia Naesstrom; Anna Nilsson | Brazil; Adriana Bonifácio Lino; Ana Carolina Duarte Ruas Custódio; Cláudia Paula Gonçalves de Amorim Oliveira; Simone Rocha; Neuzimar Santos; Luana Silva | Japan; Akiko Adachi; Mieko Kato; Masae Komiya; Yuki Naoi; Tomoe Takada; Rie Urata | Germany; Natalie Ball; Cornelia Dietz; Ina Fischer; Christiane Moller; Swetlana Otto; Stefanie Elfriede Schindler |

== Men's ==
=== Competition format ===
The twelve men's teams were divided into two even groups for a single round robin group stage. The top four teams of each group will advance to the quarter finals to compete for 1st through 8th place, while the last two teams of each group compete for 9th through 12th place. All matches in the second stage are knock-out format.

=== Group stage ===
| Qualified for the quarterfinals |

==== Group A ====
| Team | W | L | D | PF | PA | PD |
|---|---|---|---|---|---|---|
| Slovenia (SLO) | 5 | 0 | 0 | 35 | 24 | +11 |
| Lithuania (LTU) | 4 | 1 | 0 | 50 | 18 | +32 |
| Denmark (DEN) | 2 | 2 | 1 | 29 | 26 | +3 |
| Finland (FIN) | 2 | 3 | 0 | 26 | 41 | −15 |
| Belgium (BEL) | 1 | 4 | 0 | 33 | 42 | −9 |
| Spain (ESP) | 0 | 4 | 1 | 20 | 42 | −22 |

2008-09-07
| Lithuania | 9 – 5 | Belgium |
| Denmark | 2 – 2 | Spain |
| Slovenia | 7 – 2 | Finland |
2008-09-08
| Finland | 5 – 15 | Lithuania |
| Slovenia | 4 – 2 | Denmark |
| Belgium | 12 – 6 | Spain |
2008-09-09
| Finland | 4 – 11 | Denmark |
| Lithuania | 10 – 0 | Spain |
| Belgium | 5 – 6 | Slovenia |
2008-09-10
| Spain | 9 – 11 | Slovenia |
| Finland | 8 – 5 | Belgium |
| Denmark | 1 – 10 | Lithuania |
2008-09-11
| Denmark | 13 – 6 | Belgium |
| Lithuania | 6 – 7 | Slovenia |
| Spain | 3 – 7 | Finland |

==== Group B ====
| Team | W | L | D | PF | PA | PD |
|---|---|---|---|---|---|---|
| China (CHN) | 4 | 1 | 0 | 57 | 25 | +32 |
| Sweden (SWE) | 4 | 1 | 0 | 41 | 30 | +11 |
| Canada (CAN) | 2 | 3 | 0 | 27 | 30 | −3 |
| United States (USA) | 2 | 3 | 0 | 16 | 37 | −21 |
| Iran (IRI) | 2 | 3 | 0 | 29 | 34 | −5 |
| Brazil (BRA) | 1 | 4 | 0 | 25 | 39 | −14 |

2008-09-07
| Sweden | 8 – 6 | Brazil |
| Canada | 9 – 5 | Iran |
| United States | 3 – 13 | China |
2008-09-08
| China | 13 – 8 | Sweden |
| United States | 2 – 8 | Canada |
| Brazil | 5 – 8 | Iran |
2008-09-09
| China | 11 – 2 | Canada |
| Sweden | 10 – 5 | Iran |
| Brazil | 4 – 6 | United States |
2008-09-10
| Iran | 3 – 4 | United States |
| China | 14 – 4 | Brazil |
| Canada | 5 – 6 | Sweden |
2008-09-11
| Canada | 3 – 6 | Brazil |
| Sweden | 9 – 1 | United States |
| Iran | 8 – 6 | China |

=== Tournament bracket ===
Quarterfinals (2008-09-12)
1 | Lithuania | 10
8 | Canada | 0
4 | Sweden | 4
5 | Denmark | 2
2 | Slovenia | 2
7 | United States | 4
3 | China | 7
6 | Finland | 6

Semifinals (2008-09-13)
Lithuania | 10
Sweden | 3
United States | 0
China | 4

Gold medal game (2008-09-14)
Lithuania | 8
China | 9
Bronze medal game
Sweden | 5
United States | 2

=== Classification rounds ===
2008-09-12
11/12th classification

| Spain | 3 – 7 | Brazil |

2008-09-13
5-8th classification

| Canada | 6 - 5 | Finland |
| Slovenia | 4 - 6 | Denmark |

2008-09-14
7/8th classification

| Slovenia | 5 - 6 | Finland |

5/6th classification

| Denmark | 5 - 8 | Canada |

== Women's ==
=== Competition format ===
The eight women's teams will play a single round robin tournament. The top four teams advance to the semi-final to compete for 1st through 4th place.

=== Preliminary stage ===
| Qualified for the semifinals |

| Team | W | D | L | PF | PA | PD |
|---|---|---|---|---|---|---|
| China (CHN) | 6 | 1 | 0 | 21 | 7 | +14 |
| United States (USA) | 4 | 2 | 1 | 18 | 11 | +7 |
| Denmark (DEN) | 4 | 2 | 1 | 13 | 9 | +4 |
| Sweden (SWE) | 3 | 1 | 3 | 30 | 27 | +3 |
| Canada (CAN) | 2 | 3 | 2 | 15 | 13 | +2 |
| Brazil (BRA) | 2 | 1 | 4 | 21 | 24 | −3 |
| Japan (JPN) | 2 | 0 | 5 | 8 | 16 | −8 |
| Germany (GER) | 0 | 0 | 7 | 8 | 27 | −19 |

2008-09-07
| China | 5 – 3 | Brazil |
| Canada | 3 – 3 | Sweden |
| United States | 2 – 0 | Japan |
| Denmark | 4 – 1 | Germany |
2008-09-08
| United States | 2 – 0 | Denmark |
| China | 3 – 0 | Germany |
| Brazil | 6 – 5 | Canada |
| Sweden | 4 – 1 | Japan |
2008-09-09
| Canada | 3 – 0 | Japan |
| Brazil | 3 – 1 | Germany |
| Sweden | 1 – 2 | Denmark |
| China | 4 – 0 | United States |
2008-09-10
| Germany | 0 – 1 | Canada |
| Japan | 1 – 2 | Denmark |
| Sweden | 3 – 5 | China |
| Brazil | 2 – 2 | United States |
2008-09-11
| Japan | 1 – 3 | China |
| Brazil | 4 – 5 | Sweden |
| Germany | 0 – 4 | United States |
| Canada | 2 – 2 | Denmark |
2008-09-12
| United States | 1 – 1 | Canada |
| Denmark | 0 – 0 | China |
| Japan | 3 – 1 | Brazil |
| Germany | 5 – 10 | Sweden |
2008-09-13
| Denmark | 3 – 2 | Brazil |
| Germany | 1 – 2 | Japan |
| United States | 7 – 4 | Sweden |
| Canada | 0 – 1 | China |

=== Tournament bracket ===
Semifinals
United States | 4
Denmark | 3
China | 1 (3)
Sweden | 1 (2)

Gold medal game
United States | 6
China | 5
Bronze medal game
Denmark | 3
Sweden | 2

China-Sweden PSC
