= Wang Shasha =

Wang Shasha may refer to:

- Wang Shasha (goalball) (王沙沙; Wáng Shāshā, born 1986), Chinese goalball player
- Wang Shasha (handballer) (王莎莎; Wáng Shāshā, born 1987), Chinese handballer
