= Lin Shan =

Lin Shan may refer to:

- Lin Shan (goalball) (林珊; Lín Shān, born 1986), Chinese goalball player
- Lin Shan (diver) (林珊; Lín Shān, born 2001), Chinese diver
- Ashley Lin (林姗; Lín Shān, born 2003), American-Chinese figure skater
