= Goalball at the 2010 Asian Para Games =

- Venue: Guangyao Gymnasium
- Location: Guangzhou, China
- Dates: 13–18 December
- Competitors: 78 from 8 nations

Medalists
| gold medal | China (men); China (women) |
| silver medal | South Korea (men); Japan (women) |
| bronze medal | Iran (men); Iran (women) |

Goalball at the 2010 Asian Para Games were held in Guangyao Gymnasium from 13 to 18 December. There were 2 gold medals in this sport.

== Medalists ==
| Event | Gold | Silver | Bronze |
|---|---|---|---|
| Men's team | China (CHN) Du Jinran; Shao Shuai; Bao Daolei; Chen Liangliang; Cai Changgui; Hu Mingyao Coach: Zhang Yong; Assi. Coach: Fu Juan | South Korea (KOR) Oh Jung-Whan; Kim Byeong-Hoon; Bang Cheong-Sik; Hong Sung-Wook; Kim Chul-Hwan; Kim Min-Woo; Baek Dae-Hyun; Coach: Kang Ho-Yong; Assi. Coach: Choi Geum-Seon | Iran (IRI) Mohammad Soranji Estarki; Behzad Jahangiri Ghavam; Mostafa Shahbazi Yajlou; Mohsen Jalilvandshirkhanitabar; Seyed Mehdi Sayahi; Javad Shirdel; Mohammad Ebrahimzade; Coach: Mohammad Bedgoli; Assi. Coach: M. Mazlomi |
| Women's team | China (CHN) Chen Fengqing; Fan Feifei; Ju Zhen; Lin Shan; Wang Ruixue; Zhang Wei Coach: Wang Jinqin; Assi. Coach: Fu Juan | Japan (JPN) Akiko Adachi; Kyoichi Ichikawa; Masae Komiya; Akane Nakashima; Yuki Naoi; Masako Nomura; Rie Urata; Coach: Naoki Eguro; Assi. Coach: Tohru Masuda | Iran (IRI) Maryam Devisti; Zeinab Ghanbari; Maryam Kouh Fallah; Samira Jalilvand Shirkhanitabar; Tayebeh Esteki Ouregani; Saeideh Sadat Ghamsari Jevinani; Tayebeh Maleki; Coach: Mohammad Bedgoli; Assi. Coach: Roghayeh Fatehi |

== Men's tournament ==
=== Group Round ===
==== Group A ====
| Team | Pld | W | D | L | PF | PA | PD | Pts |
|---|---|---|---|---|---|---|---|---|
| China (CHN) | 3 | 3 | 0 | 0 | 44 | 19 | +25 | 9 |
| Japan (JPN) | 3 | 2 | 0 | 1 | 33 | 27 | +6 | 6 |
| Thailand (THA) | 3 | 1 | 0 | 2 | 16 | 29 | -13 | 3 |
| Malaysia (MAS) | 3 | 0 | 0 | 3 | 19 | 37 | -18 | 0 |

2010-12-13
| China | 13 – 3 | Thailand |
| Japan | 14 – 6 | Malaysia |
2010-12-14
| China | 17 – 11 | Malaysia |
2010-12-15
| Japan | 14 – 7 | Thailand |
2010-12-16
| Thailand | 6 – 2 | Malaysia |
| China | 14 – 5 | Japan |

==== Group B ====
| Team | Pld | W | D | L | PF | PA | PD | Pts |
|---|---|---|---|---|---|---|---|---|
| South Korea (KOR) | 4 | 4 | 0 | 0 | 45 | 19 | +26 | 12 |
| Iran (IRI) | 4 | 3 | 0 | 1 | 32 | 13 | +19 | 9 |
| Iraq (IRQ) | 4 | 2 | 0 | 2 | 35 | 20 | +15 | 6 |
| Jordan (JOR) | 4 | 1 | 0 | 3 | 17 | 37 | -20 | 3 |
| Pakistan (PAK) | 4 | 0 | 0 | 4 | 4 | 44 | -40 | 0 |

2010-12-13
| Iran | 11 – 1 | Jordan |
| South Korea | 12 – 8 | Iraq |
2010-12-14
| South Korea | 12 – 2 | Jordan |
| Iran | 10 – 0 | Pakistan |
| Iraq | 13 – 3 | Jordan |
2010-12-15
| South Korea | 12 – 2 | Pakistan |
| Iran | 4 – 3 | Iraq |
| Pakistan | 1 – 11 | Jordan |
2010-12-16
| Iraq | 11 – 1 | Pakistan |
| Iran | 7 – 9 | South Korea |

=== Tournament bracket ===
Semifinals (2010-12-17)
A1 | China (CHN) | 13
B2 | Iran (IRI) | 4
B1 | South Korea (KOR) | 6
A2 | Japan (JPN) | 4

Gold Medal Match (2010-12-18)
A1 | China (CHN) | 12
B1 | South Korea (KOR) | 2
Bronze Medal Match
B2 | Iran (IRI) | 8
A2 | Japan (JPN) | 2

== Women's tournament ==
| Team | Pld | W | D | L | PF | PA | PD | Pts |
|---|---|---|---|---|---|---|---|---|
| China (CHN) | 4 | 4 | 0 | 0 | 36 | 4 | +32 | 12 |
| Japan (JPN) | 4 | 3 | 0 | 1 | 18 | 4 | +14 | 9 |
| Iran (IRI) | 4 | 2 | 0 | 2 | 25 | 21 | +4 | 6 |
| South Korea (KOR) | 4 | 1 | 0 | 3 | 9 | 28 | -19 | 3 |
| Laos (LAO) | 4 | 0 | 0 | 4 | 6 | 37 | -31 | 0 |

2010-12-13
| China | 12 – 2 | Iran |
| South Korea | 7 – 3 | Laos |
2010-12-14
| China | 11 – 1 | South Korea |
| Japan | 6 – 0 | Iran |
2010-12-15
| Japan | 8 – 1 | Laos |
2010-12-16
| China | 10 – 0 | Laos |
| South Korea | 1 – 11 | Iran |
2010-12-17
| Japan | 3 – 0 | South Korea |
| Iran | 12 – 2 | Laos |
2010-12-18
| China | 3 – 1 | Japan |
