= Yang Chunhong =

Chinese goalball player

Personal information
- Born: August 24, 1987 (age 38) Luquan Yi and Miao Autonomous County, Yunnan, China

Sport
- Sport: Men's goalball
Medal record
Representing China
Paralympic Games
Gold medal – first place	2008 Beijing	Team

Yang Chunhong
- Traditional Chinese: 楊春宏
- Simplified Chinese: 杨春宏
Transcriptions
Standard Mandarin
- Hanyu Pinyin: Yáng Chūnhóng

Yang Chunhong (Chinese: 杨春宏, born 24 August 1987) is a Chinese retired goalball player. He won a gold medal at the 2008 Summer Paralympics.

Yang was from the mountains in Luquan Yi and Miao Autonomous County, Yunnan province. He was blinded by a doctor's steroid eyedrops which damaged his cornea when he was in the third year of junior high. Although his family won the medical malpractice lawsuit, it did not receive any compensation because the doctor did not have money. The family had to borrow money to pay for his eye surgery.
