= Costa Rica women's national goalball team =

Costa Rica national team, for the Paralympic sport of goalball

Selecciones Nacionales Femenina de Goalball
- Sport: Goalball
- League: IBSA
- Division: Women
- Region: IBSA America
- Location: Costa Rica
- Championships: Paralympic Games medals: : 0: 0: 0 World Championship medals: : 0: 0: 0

Costa Rica women's national goalball team is the women's national team of Costa Rica. Goalball is a team sport designed specifically for athletes with a vision impairment. The team takes part in international competitions.

== Regional championships ==
The team competes in the IBSA America goalball region. The winner of the championships usually qualifies for a berth at the World Championships or the Paralympic Games.

=== 2017 São Paulo ===
The team competed at the 2017 IBSA Goalball Americas Championships from Wednesday 29 November 2017 to Sunday 3 December 2017, at São Paulo, Brazil. There were six women's teams: Brazil, Canada, Costa Rica, Mexico, Peru, USA.

The team came fifth, ahead of Peru.

=== 2019 Lima ===
The team competed at the 2019 Parapan American Games from 23 August 2019 to 1 September 2019, at the Miguel Grau Coliseum, Lima, Peru. This championships was a qualifier for the 2020 Paralympic Games. There were six women's teams: Brazil, Canada, Costa Rica, Mexico, Peru, USA. The team was Jazmin Sanchez, Lucia Ureña, Rosario Vargas, and Matilde Zamora, with Andres Carpio Mora (coach) and Jenny Alvarado Cuadra (assistant coach).

Costa Rica was mercied 3:13 by Mexico, 0:10 by Brazil, 0:10 by Canada, and 0:10 by USA. Their final game was won by Peru 7:0.

=== 2022 São Paulo ===
Due to the ongoing COVID-19 pandemic, the IBSA America championship moved from 6 to 13 November 2021, to 18 to 22 February 2022. The event is being held at the Centro de Treinamento Paralímpico (Paralympic Training Center) in São Paulo. This championships is a qualifier for the 2022 World Championships.

There are twelve women's teams: Argentina, Brazil, Canada, Chile, Colombia, Costa Rica, Guatemala, Mexico, Nicaragua, Peru, USA, Venezuela.

== See also ==
- Disabled sports
- Costa Rica at the Paralympics
