= Wang Ruixue =

Chinese goalball player

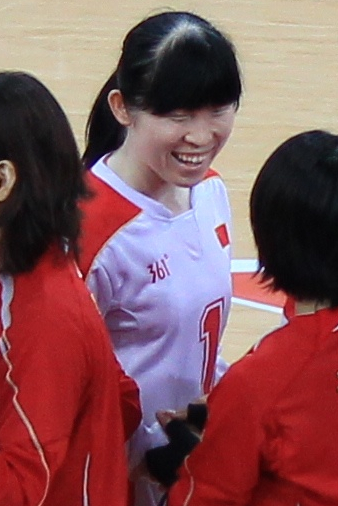
- Wang at the 2012 Summer Paralympics

Personal information
- Born: May 4, 1987 (age 39) Weifang, Shandong, China

Sport
- Sport: Women's goalball
- Disability class: B2
Medal record
Representing China
Paralympic Games
Silver medal – second place	2008 Beijing	Team
Silver medal – second place	2012 London	Team
Asian Para Games
Gold medal – first place	2010 Guangzhou	Team

Wang Ruixue (Chinese: 王瑞雪; pinyin: Wáng Ruìxuě, born 4 May 1987) is a Chinese retired goalball player. She won a silver medal at both the 2008 Summer Paralympics and the 2012 Summer Paralympics.

Wang has congenital albinism. Like her national teammates Lin Shan, Fan Feifei, and Ju Zhen, she started playing the sport under coach Wang Jinqin at the Weifang School of the Blind in Weifang, Shandong province. Since 2012, she has been teaching at the school.
