= Xu Juan =

Chinese goalball player

Personal information
- Born: May 8, 1981 (age 45) Jurong, Jiangsu, China

Sport
- Sport: Women's goalball
Medal record
Representing China
Paralympic Games
| Silver medal – second place | 2008 Beijing | Team |

Xu Juan
- Traditional Chinese: 許娟
- Simplified Chinese: 许娟
Transcriptions
Standard Mandarin
- Hanyu Pinyin: Xǔ Juān

Xu Juan (Chinese: 许娟, born 8 May 1981) is a Chinese retired goalball player. She won a silver medal at the 2008 Summer Paralympics.

Her visual impairment is hereditary. From a rural background, she took part in the Jiangsu Provincial Para Games in 1999, winning bronze medals in discus throw, shot put, and javelin throw. Thereafter, she was invited to try goalball. She also taught massage classes. After retirement, she became the chairperson for the Blind Persons' Association in her home city Jurong, Jiangsu.
