= Jackie Barnes (goalball) =

American Paralympic goalball player

Personal information
- Full name: Jaclyn Barnes
- Born: November 29, 1986 (age 39)
- Home town: Illinois, U.S.
Medal record
Women's goalball
Representing the United States
Paralympic Games
Gold medal – first place	2008 Beijing	Team

Jaclyn Barnes (born November 29, 1986) is an American goalball player. Although originally disinterested in the sport, fearing it was a "special" sport and new to losing her vision, she later embraced it. She was on the gold medal-winning US team in Goalball at the 2008 Summer Paralympics.
