= Kelley Hannett =

Canadian para-goalball player

Medal record
Women's goalball
Representing Canada
Paralympic Games
Gold medal – first place	2004 Athens	Team

Kelley Hannett is a Canadian para-goalball player. As a member of Canada women's national goalball team, Hannett won a gold medal at the 2004 Summer Paralympics.
