= Fan Feifei =

Chinese goalball player

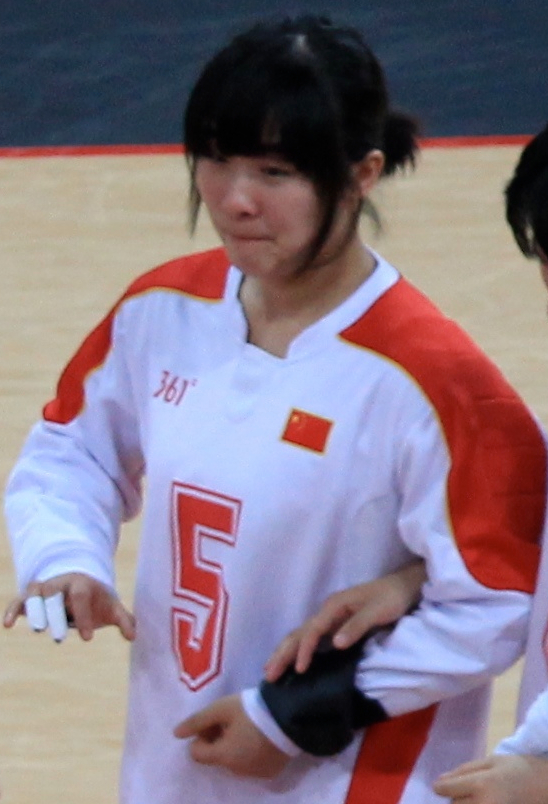
- Fan at the 2012 Summer Paralympics

Personal information
- Born: September 1, 1989 (age 36) Shouguang, Shandong, China

Sport
- Sport: Women's goalball
- Disability class: B3
Medal record
Representing China
Paralympic Games
Silver medal – second place	2008 Beijing	Team
Silver medal – second place	2012 London	Team
Asian Para Games
Gold medal – first place	2010 Guangzhou	Team

Fan Feifei (Chinese: 范菲菲; pinyin: Fàn Fēifēi, born 1 September 1989) is a Chinese retired goalball player. She won a silver medal at both the 2008 Summer Paralympics and the 2012 Summer Paralympics.

Fan had congenital cataract, a kind of visual impairment. She began playing goalball when she was 10 years old; just a year later she helped her province Shandong win a bronze medal at the National Para Games, at the age of 11. Donations poured in after her story was publicized, and she has since gained 20/200 vision through a cataract surgery in Shanghai.

Like her national teammates Lin Shan, Wang Ruixue, and Ju Zhen, Fan started playing the sport under coach Wang Jinqin at the Weifang School of the Blind in Weifang, Shandong.
