= Chen Liangliang =

Chinese goalball player (born 1984)

Personal information
- Born: September 28, 1984 (age 41) Lankao County, Henan, China
- Height: 172 cm (5 ft 8 in)
- Weight: 85 kg (187 lb)

Sport
- Sport: Men's goalball
- Disability class: B1
Medal record
Representing China
Paralympic Games
Gold medal – first place	2008 Beijing	Team
Silver medal – second place	2020 Tokyo	Team
Asian Para Games
Gold medal – first place	2010 Guangzhou	Team
Silver medal – second place	2018 Jakarta	Team

Chen Liangliang
- Traditional Chinese: 陳亮亮
- Simplified Chinese: 陈亮亮
Transcriptions
Standard Mandarin
- Hanyu Pinyin: Chén Liàngliàng

Chen Liangliang (Chinese: 陈亮亮, born 28 September 1984) is a Chinese goalball player. He won a gold medal at the 2008 Summer Paralympics. He was the top scorer in the tournament with 17 goals, and he scored 6 goals in the final against Lithuania.

When he was six years old, he developed blindness after pouring cold well water over his head. He was diagnosed with optic neuropathy. His parents sold everything in the house to cover his medical bills, but he never regained his eyesight. He began to play goalball when he was 15.
