= Yao Yongquan =

Chinese goalball player

Personal information
- Born: January 15, 1987 (age 39) Zhuanghe, Liaoning, China

Sport
- Sport: Men's goalball
- Disability class: B2
Medal record
Representing China
Paralympic Games
Gold medal – first place	2008 Beijing	Team

Yao Yongquan (Chinese: 姚永全; pinyin: Yáo Yǒngquán, born 15 January 1987) is a Chinese retired goalball player. He won a gold medal at the 2008 Summer Paralympics. He scored the winning goal in the last seconds of the final as China beat Lithuania 9–8.

Yao lost most of his eyesight after an accident in 1998. He studied acupuncture and has worked as a medical provider in a hospital in his hometown of Dalian, Liaoning province, following his retirement.
