= Cai Changgui =

Chinese goalball player (born 1983)

Personal information
- Born: April 15, 1983 (age 43) Yancheng, Jiangsu, China
- Education: Nanjing University
- Height: 178 cm (5 ft 10 in)
- Weight: 100 kg (220 lb)
- Spouse: Wang Shasha

Sport
- Sport: Men's goalball
- Disability class: B1
Medal record
Representing China
Paralympic Games
Gold medal – first place	2008 Beijing	Team
Silver medal – second place	2020 Tokyo	Team
Asian Para Games
Gold medal – first place	2010 Guangzhou	Team
Silver medal – second place	2018 Jakarta	Team

Cai Changgui
- Traditional Chinese: 蔡長貴
- Simplified Chinese: 蔡长贵
Transcriptions
Standard Mandarin
- Hanyu Pinyin: Cài Chángguì

Cai Changgui (Chinese: 蔡长贵, born 15 April 1983) is a Chinese goalball player. He won a gold medal at the 2008 Summer Paralympics.

He competed in the 2012 Summer Paralympics despite an infection and the doctor's bed-rest order, after sneaking out of the hospital.

Cai lost his eyesight when he was 10 years old, due to a medical accident involving an injection.

== Personal life ==
Cai is married to goalball player Wang Shasha, who is also blind. The couple live in Hangzhou. He has a black Labrador guide dog named "Sanhao" (Chinese: 三好; pinyin: Sānhǎo; lit. 'Triple Good').
