= Du Jinran =

Chinese goalball player

Personal information
- Born: 12 May 1986 (age 40) Beijing, China
- Education: Beijing Union University

Sport
- Sport: Men's goalball
- Disability class: B2
Medal record
Representing China
Paralympic Games
Gold medal – first place	2008 Beijing	Team
Asian Para Games
Gold medal – first place	2010 Guangzhou	Team

Du Jinran
- Traditional Chinese: 杜進冉
- Simplified Chinese: 杜进冉
Transcriptions
Standard Mandarin
- Hanyu Pinyin: Dù Jìnrǎn

Du Jinran (Chinese: 杜进冉, born 12 May 1986) is a Chinese former goalball player. He won a gold medal at the 2008 Summer Paralympics.

He developed visual impairment during middle school.
