= Contessa Scott =

Canadian former goalball athlete

Medal record
Women's goalball
Representing Canada
Paralympic Games
Gold medal – first place	2000 Sydney	Team
Gold medal – first place	2004 Athens	Team

Contessa Scott is a Canadian former goalball athlete. Having started playing the game at 11 years old, she won two medals with the Canada women's national goalball team in 2000 and 2004.
