= Lin Shan (goalball) =

Chinese goalball player

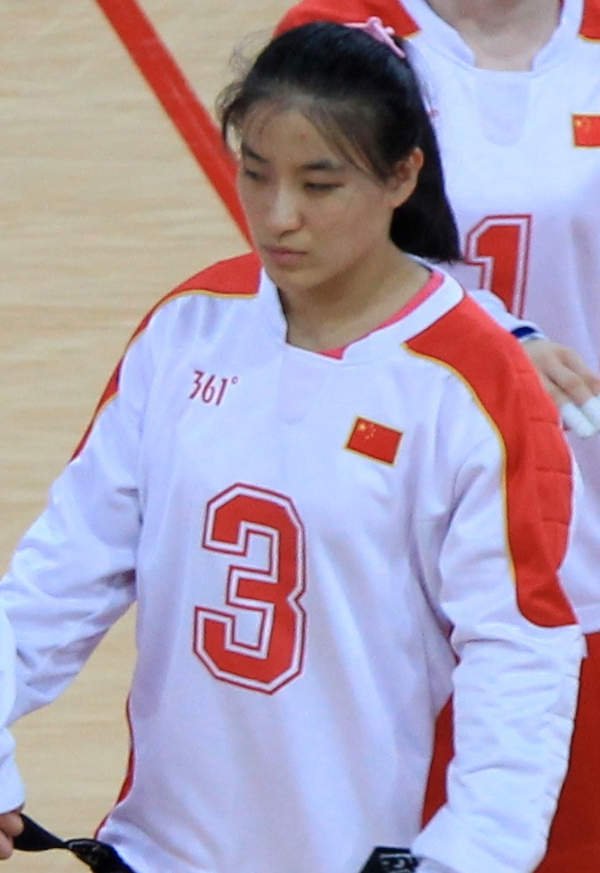
- Lin at the 2012 Summer Paralympics

Personal information
- Born: March 2, 1986 (age 40) Zhucheng, Shandong, China
- Education: Beijing Union University

Sport
- Sport: Women's goalball
- Disability class: B3
Medal record
Representing China
Paralympic Games
Silver medal – second place	2008 Beijing	Team
Silver medal – second place	2012 London	Team
Asian Para Games
Gold medal – first place	2010 Guangzhou	Team
Gold medal – first place	2014 Incheon	Team

Lin Shan (Chinese: 林珊; pinyin: Lín Shān, born 2 March 1986) is a Chinese retired goalball player. She won a silver medal in both the 2008 Summer Paralympics and the 2012 Summer Paralympics.

Due to a hereditary disease, she has been blind since her youth. She attended Beijing Union University and was the only university student on the 2008 Paralympic team.

Like her national teammates Fan Feifei, Wang Ruixue, and Ju Zhen, Fan started playing the sport under coach Wang Jinqin at the Weifang School of the Blind in Weifang, Shandong.
