= Ashlie Andrews =

Canadian goalball player

Personal information
- Full name: Ashlie Marie Andrews
- Born: 4 January 1993 (age 33) Prince George, British Columbia, Canada
- Home town: Penticton, British Columbia

Sport
- Country: Canada
- Sport: Goalball
- Disability: Ocular albinism, nystagmus
Medal record
Women's Goalball
Representing Canada
World Championships
Bronze medal – third place	2015	Team
Parapan American Games
Bronze medal – third place	2011 Guadalajara	Team
Bronze medal – third place	2015 Toronto	Team

Ashlie Marie Andrews (born 4 January 1993) is a Canadian goalball player who competes in international level events.
