= Wang Shasha (goalball) =

Chinese goalball player

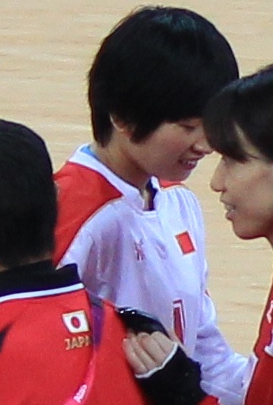
- Wang at the 2012 Summer Paralympics

Personal information
- Born: October 14, 1986 (age 39) Shuyang County, Jiangsu, China
- Spouse: Cai Changgui

Sport
- Sport: Women's goalball
- Disability class: B1
Medal record
Representing China
Paralympic Games
Silver medal – second place	2008 Beijing	Team
Silver medal – second place	2012 London	Team
Asian Para Games
Silver medal – second place	2018 Jakarta	Team

Wang Shasha (Chinese: 王沙沙; pinyin: Wáng Shāshā, born 14 October 1986) is a Chinese goalball player. She won a silver medal at both the 2008 Summer Paralympics and the 2012 Summer Paralympics.

== Personal life ==
Wang is married to goalball player Cai Changgui, who is also blind. The couple live in Hangzhou.
