= Bao Daolei =

Chinese goalball player

Personal information
- Born: March 17, 1988 (age 38) Shanghai, China
- Height: 185 cm (6 ft 1 in)
- Weight: 85 kg (187 lb)

Sport
- Sport: Men's goalball
- Disability class: B2
Medal record
Representing China
Paralympic Games
| Gold medal – first place | 2008 Beijing | Team |
Asian Para Games
| Gold medal – first place | 2010 Guangzhou | Team |

Bao Daolei (Chinese: 鲍道磊; pinyin: Bào Dàolěi, born 17 March 1988) is a Chinese retired goalball player. He won a gold medal at the 2008 Summer Paralympics.

He had congenital cataracts.
