= Goalball at the 2004 Summer Paralympics =

Goalball at the XII Paralympic Games
- Paralympic Goalball
- Venue: Sports Pavilion
- Dates: 19-26 September 2004

Goalball at the 2004 Summer Paralympics took place at the Sports Pavilion of the Faliro Coastal Zone Olympic Sports Complex, in Athens, Greece.

Goalball is open to blind and partially sighted competitors, with separate men's and women's competitions.

== Men's tournament ==
Goalball - Men at the XII Paralympic Games
- Paralympic Goalball
- Venue: Faliro Sports Pavilion Arena
- Dates: 20–26 September 2004
- Competitors: 12

Medalists
1st place, gold medalist(s)		Martin Enggaard Pedersen; Soren Holmgren Jensen; Ricky Nielsen; Kenneth Hansen; Peter Weichel	Denmark
2nd place, silver medalist(s)		Boris Samuelsson; Jimmy Bjoerkstrand; Niklas Hultqvist; Mikael Rendahl; Mikael Aspegren; Oskar Kuus	Sweden
3rd place, bronze medalist(s)		Christopher Dodds; Donte Mickens; Daniel Gallant; Edward Munro; Tyler Merren; John Mulhern jr.	United States

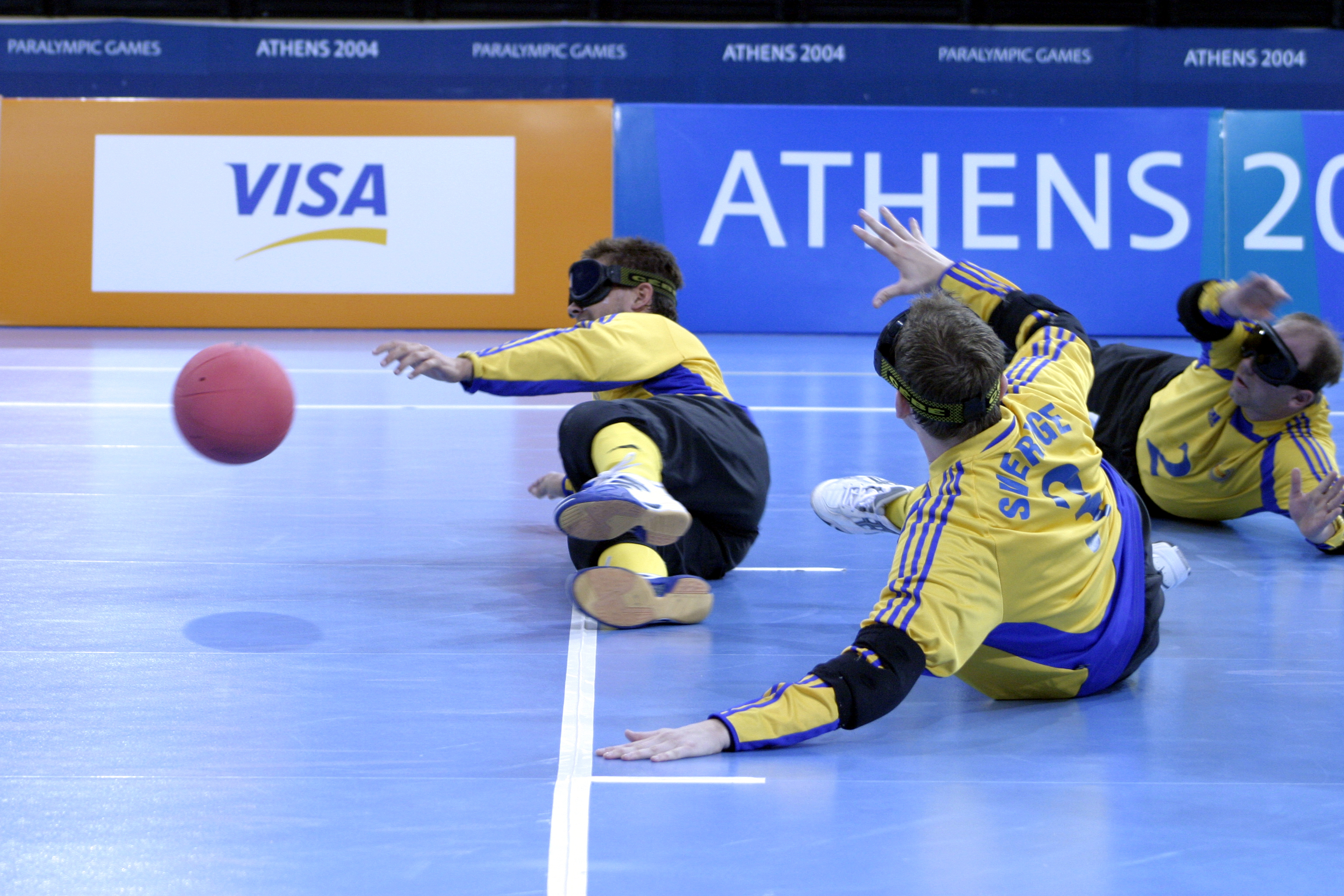
The Swedish men's goalball team at the 2004 Paralympic Games

The Men's tournament was won by the team representing Denmark.

== Results ==
=== Preliminaries ===
Qualified for final round

Rank	Competitor	MP	W	D	L	Goals	Points	DEN	SWE	USA	CAN	GER	GRE
1	Denmark	5	4	1	0	42:17	13	x	3:3	10:7	10:1	9:3	10:3
2	Sweden	5	2	3	0	21:14	9	3:3	x	1:1	4:4	3:1	10:5
3	United States	5	2	1	2	34:26	7	7:10	1:1	x	8:12	7:2	11:1
4	Canada	5	2	1	2	34:32	7	1:10	4:4	12:8	x	4:5	13:5
5	Germany	5	2	0	3	24:26	6	3:9	1:3	2:7	5:4	x	13:3
6	Greece	5	0	0	5	17:57	0	3:10	5:10	1:11	5:13	3:13	x

==== Group B ====
Rank	Competitor	MP	W	D	L	Goals	Points	ESP	KOR	FIN	HUN	LTU	SLO
1	Spain	5	4	1	0	23:15	13	x	9:8	3:3	3:2	4:1	4:1
2	South Korea	5	3	0	2	35:34	9	8:9	x	0:10	7:5	10:5	10:5
3	Finland	5	2	1	2	20:20	7	3:3	10:0	x	2:1	4:8	1:8
4	Hungary	5	2	0	3	18:14	6	2:3	5:7	1:2	x	6:1	4:1
5	Lithuania	5	2	0	3	22:28	6	1:4	5:10	8:4	1:6	x	7:4
6	Slovenia	5	1	0	4	19:26	3	1:4	5:10	8:1	1:4	4:7	x

=== Competition bracket ===
Quarterfinals
United States	5
Spain	1
Denmark	9
Hungary	3
Sweden	5
Finland	1
Canada	9
South Korea	4

Semifinals
United States	1
Denmark	8
Sweden	5
Canada	3

Finals
Denmark	7
Sweden	5
Third place
United States	5
Canada	4

=== Classification 5-8 ===
Semi-finals
South Korea	3
Finland	5
Hungary	1
Spain	4

Fifth place
Finland	4
Spain	3
Third place
Hungary	8
South Korea	3

=== Classification 9-12 ===
==== Classification 9/10 ====
Lithuania	6 – 4	Germany

==== Classification 11/12 ====
Slovenia	12 – 2	Greece

== Team Lists ==
Denmark; Martin Enggaard Pedersen; Soren Holmgren Jensen; Ricky Nielsen; Kenneth Hansen; Peter Weichel	Sweden; Boris Samuelsson; Jimmy Bjoerkstrand; Niklas Hultqvist; Mikael Rendahl; Mikael Aspegren; Oskar Kuus	Canada; Rob Christy; Mario Caron; Bruno Hache; Dean Kozak; Jeff Christy; Kevin Kaminski	United States; Christopher Dodds; Donté Mickens; Daniel Gallant; Edward Munro; Tyler Merren; John Mulhern jr.
Germany; Mathias Koehler; Michael Breidbach; Thomas Betzl; Matthias Schmidt; Johann Demmelhuber; Steffen Lehmann	Greece; Nikolaos Chatzidafnis; Athanasios Chasiotis; Sotirios Michalopoulos; Anastasios Trikalitis; Antonios Diamantopoulos; Nikolaos Argyros	Spain; Jose Daniel Fernandez; Ignacio Garrido; Jose Perez; Vicente Galiana; Roberto Abenia; Tomas Rubio	South Korea; Oh Jeong Hwan; Kim Chul Hwan; Lee Sun Haeng; Lee Yoon Bong; Won Pong Pil; Hong Jang Hyun
Finland; Juha Oikarainen; Arttu Makinen; Sami Mustonen; Petri Posio; Veli Matti Aittola; Jarno Mattila	Hungary; Sandor Orsos; Sandor Szell; Szabolcs Hajba; Zsolt Orsos; Szillard Belafi; Andras Szabo	Lithuania; Marius Zibolis; Genrik Pavliukianec; Egidijus Biknevicius; Arvydas Juchna; Saulius Leonavicius; Algirdas Montvydas	Slovenia; Matej Ledinek; Ivan Vinkler; Gorazd Dolanc; Zlatko Mihajlovic; Dejan Pirc; Bostjan Vogrincic

== Women's tournament ==
Goalball - Women at the XII Paralympic Games
- Paralympic Goalball
- Venue: Faliro Sports Pavilion Arena
- Dates: 20–26 September 2004
- Competitors: 8

Medalists
1st place, gold medalist(s)		Kelley Hannett; Amy Alsop; Contessa Scott; Annette Lisabeth; Viviane Forest; Nancy Morin	Canada
2nd place, silver medalist(s)		Nicole Buck; Robin Theryoung; Asya Miller; Lisa Banta; Jessica Lorenz; Jennifer Armbruster	United States
3rd place, bronze medalist(s)		Madoka Sano; Eriko Kumakawa; Yuka Naoi; Mieko Asai; Yuki Naoi; Masae Komiya	Japan

The Women's tournament was won by the team representing Canada.

== Results ==
=== Preliminaries ===
Qualified for final round

Rank	Competitor	MP	W	D	L	Goals	Points	CAN	USA	JPN	FIN	NED	GER	BRA
1	Canada	7	7	0	0	31:2	21	x	2:0	2:0	3:1	9:0	3:0	4:1
2	United States	7	6	0	1	18:4	18	0:2	x	6:1	3:1	2:0	2:0	2:0
3	Japan	7	4	1	2	16:17	13	0:2	1:6	x	2:1	1:1	6:3	4:3
4	Finland	7	4	0	3	30:10	12	1:3	1:3	1:2	x	8:1	5:1	10:0
5	Netherlands	7	3	1	3	15:22	10	0:9	0:2	1:1	1:8	x	4:0	3:1
6	Germany	7	2	0	5	10:21	6	0:3	0:2	3:6	1:5	0:4	x	4:1
7	Brazil	7	1	0	6	7:27	3	1:4	0:2	3:4	0:10	1:3	1:4	x
8	Greece	7	0	0	7	2:26	0	0:8	0:3	1:2	0:4	1:6	0:2	0:1

=== Competition bracket ===
Semi-finals
Finland	2
Canada	4
United States	3
Japan	1

Final
Canada	3
United States	1
Third place
Japan	2
Finland	1
