= Ju Zhen =

Chinese goalball player

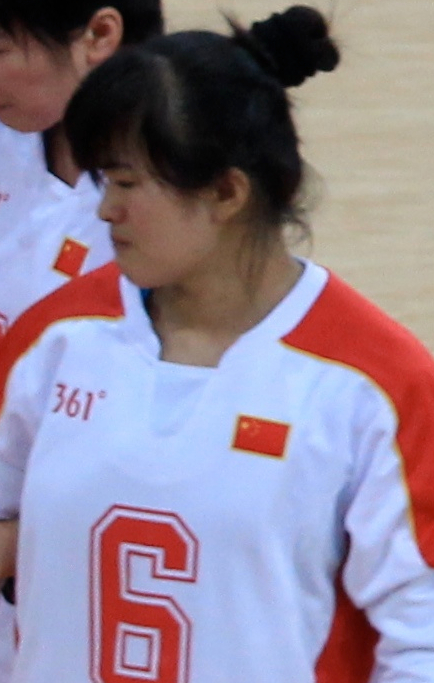
- Ju at the 2012 Summer Paralympics

Personal information
- Born: May 10, 1989 (age 37) Weifang, Shandong, China
- Height: 162 cm (5 ft 4 in)
- Weight: 55 kg (121 lb)

Sport
- Sport: Women's goalball
- Disability class: B2 (formerly B3)
Medal record
Representing China
Paralympic Games
Silver medal – second place	2012 London	Team
Silver medal – second place	2016 Rio de Janeiro	Team
Asian Para Games
Gold medal – first place	2010 Guangzhou	Team
Gold medal – first place	2014 Incheon	Team

Ju Zhen
- Traditional Chinese: 鞠貞
- Simplified Chinese: 鞠贞
Transcriptions
Standard Mandarin
- Hanyu Pinyin: Jú Zhēn

Ju Zhen (Chinese: 鞠贞, born 10 May 1989) is a Chinese goalball player. She won a silver medal at both the 2012 and 2016 Summer Paralympics.

Like her national teammates Lin Shan, Fan Feifei, and Wang Ruixue, Ju Zhen started playing the sport under coach Wang Jinqin at the Weifang School of the Blind in Weifang, Shandong province.
