= Laos at the 2010 Asian Para Games =

- IOC code: LAO
- NPC: Lao Paralympic Committee

in Guangzhou 12–19 December 2010
- Competitors: 10 in 3 sports
- Medals: Gold 0 Silver 0 Bronze 0 Total 0

Asian Para Games appearances
- 2010; 2014; 2018; 2022; 2026

Youth appearances
- 2009

Laos participated in the 2010 Asian Para Games in Guangzhou, China from 13 to 19 December 2010. Athletes from Laos competed three events.
