= Nancy Morin =

Canadian goalball player (1975–2020)

Personal information
- Born: 28 August 1975 Longueuil, Quebec, Canada
- Died: 8 May 2020 (aged 44)

Sport
- Country: Canada
- Sport: Goalball
Medal record
Women's Goalball
Representing Canada
Paralympic Games
Gold medal – first place	2000 Sydney	Team
Gold medal – first place	2004 Athens	Team
World Goalball Championships
Gold medal – first place	2006	Team
Silver medal – second place	2002	Team
Parapan American Games
Bronze medal – third place	2011 Guadalajara	Team
Bronze medal – third place	2015 Toronto	Team

Nancy Morin (28 August 1975 – 8 May 2020) was a blind Canadian goalball player who competed in international level events. She participated in five Summer Paralympic Games and won two consecutive gold medals.
