= Yuki Naoi =

Japanese goalball player

Personal information
- Born: 17 March 1963 (age 63) Maebashi, Gunma, Japan

Sport
- Sport: Women's goalball
- Disability: Retinitis pigmentosa
- Disability class: B2
Medal record
Representing Japan
Paralympic Games
Bronze medal – third place	2004 Athens	Team
Asian Para Games
Silver medal – second place	2010 Guangzhou	Team

Yuki Naoi (直井 由紀, Naoi Yuki; born 17 March 1963) is a Japanese retired goalball player. She won a bronze medal at the 2004 Summer Paralympics with the Japanese team which also included her twin sister Yuka Naoi.

Like Yuka, she has retinitis pigmentosa. She developed symptoms when she was in junior high, before her sister.
