= Amy Alsop =

Canadian Paralympic goalball player

Personal information
- Born: 30 June 1978 (age 47) Saskatoon, Canada

Sport
- Sport: Goalball
Medal record
Goalball
Representing Canada
Paralympic Games
Gold medal – first place	2000 Sydney	Women's tournament
Gold medal – first place	2004 Athens	Women's tournament
Parapan American Games
Gold medal – first place	2011 Guadalajara	Women's tournament

Amy Alsop (born June 30, 1978) is a Canadian Paralympian from Saskatoon. She is a two-time Paralympic gold medalist for goalball.

== Early life ==
Alsop was born with only 10 per cent of her vision and used Canadian National Institute for the Blind services to gain independence. While learning to swim, Alsop met the coach of the local goalball team who encouraged her to join the sport.

== Career ==
Alsop joined the Canadian National goalball team in 1997. She competed in the 2000 Summer Paralympics where she won a gold medal in Goalball.

Alsop was again selected to compete with Team Canada at the 2004 Summer Paralympics, where she won another gold medal by only allowing in 1.5 goals on 419 shots. As a result, she was nominated by Saskatchewan Blind Sports for the 2004 Athlete of the Month Award. She captained Team Canada at the 2008 Summer Paralympics, where the team placed fifth.

After retiring, she was hired at SaskTel in Regina as a service development manager. In 2013, she was appointed community co-chair of the Citizen Consultation Team by the Government of Saskatchewan.
