= 2011–12 Australia women's national goalball team =

Australia women's national goalball team
2011–12 season
- Coach: Georgina Kenaghan
- 2011 African-Oceania regional qualifying: 1st
- 2012 Summer Paralympics: 9th

The 2011–12 Australia women's national goalball team, known as the Belles, is a goalball team that played in two Paralympic qualifying competitions and the 2012 Summer Paralympics. The official announcement confirming the 2011–12 team was made in May 2012. The team included Jennifer Blow, Meica Christensen, Michelle Rzepecki, Nicole Esdaile, Rachel Henderson and Tyan Taylor. Most of the players, with the exception of Christensen, were relatively new. Their first competition was the International Blind Sports Federation (IBSA) World Goalball Games, with the top two teams qualifying for the Summer Paralympics. While Australia finished second in its pool, it ended the tournament in sixth place following a loss to Israel. Their second major competition was the ISBA Oceania-Africa Goalball Regional Championships, where they beat New Zealand in the semi-final, and again in the final, to qualify for the London 2012 Paralympic Games.

At the Paralympics, the Belles, in the same pool as China, Japan, Canada, the United States and Sweden, played Japan first, losing 1–3. In their second game of pool play, they lost to Canada 1–3. They lost their last two games in pool play by 0–3 to the United States and 5–8 to Sweden. This placed them last in the pool, and they did not qualify for the finals.

== Background ==
The team is nicknamed the Belles. Going into the competitions for qualifying for the London 2012 Paralympic Games, the Australian Paralympic Committee was thinking ahead, hoping to build a new, young team that would qualify for the 2016 Summer Paralympics in Rio de Janeiro. The series of competitions leading up to the London 2012 Paralympic Games were seen as providing valuable training and experience.

The first selection process for 2011–12 took place in January 2011, at a camp that was by invitation only. The final 2012 Summer Paralympics team selection announcement was made in May 2012, and included Jennifer Blow, Meica Christensen, Michelle Rzepecki, Nicole Esdaile, Rachel Henderson and Tyan Taylor. This included three players from New South Wales, two from Queensland and one from South Australia. Christensen captained the side. The team was coached by Georgina Kenaghan. Support staff for the London team included Section Manager Peter Corr and team physiotherapist Eliza Kwan. Christensen came into the qualifying period as the most capped player on the team, having first played for it in 2004, but Taylor had only started playing in 2009, making her national debut at the 2010 IBSA World Championships, and Blow and Henderson had only taken up the sport in 2010. Team members received varying amounts of assistance through the Australian Sports Commission's Direct Athlete Support (DAS) program, with Blow and Henderson getting A$7,000.

2011–12 Australian women's national goalball team
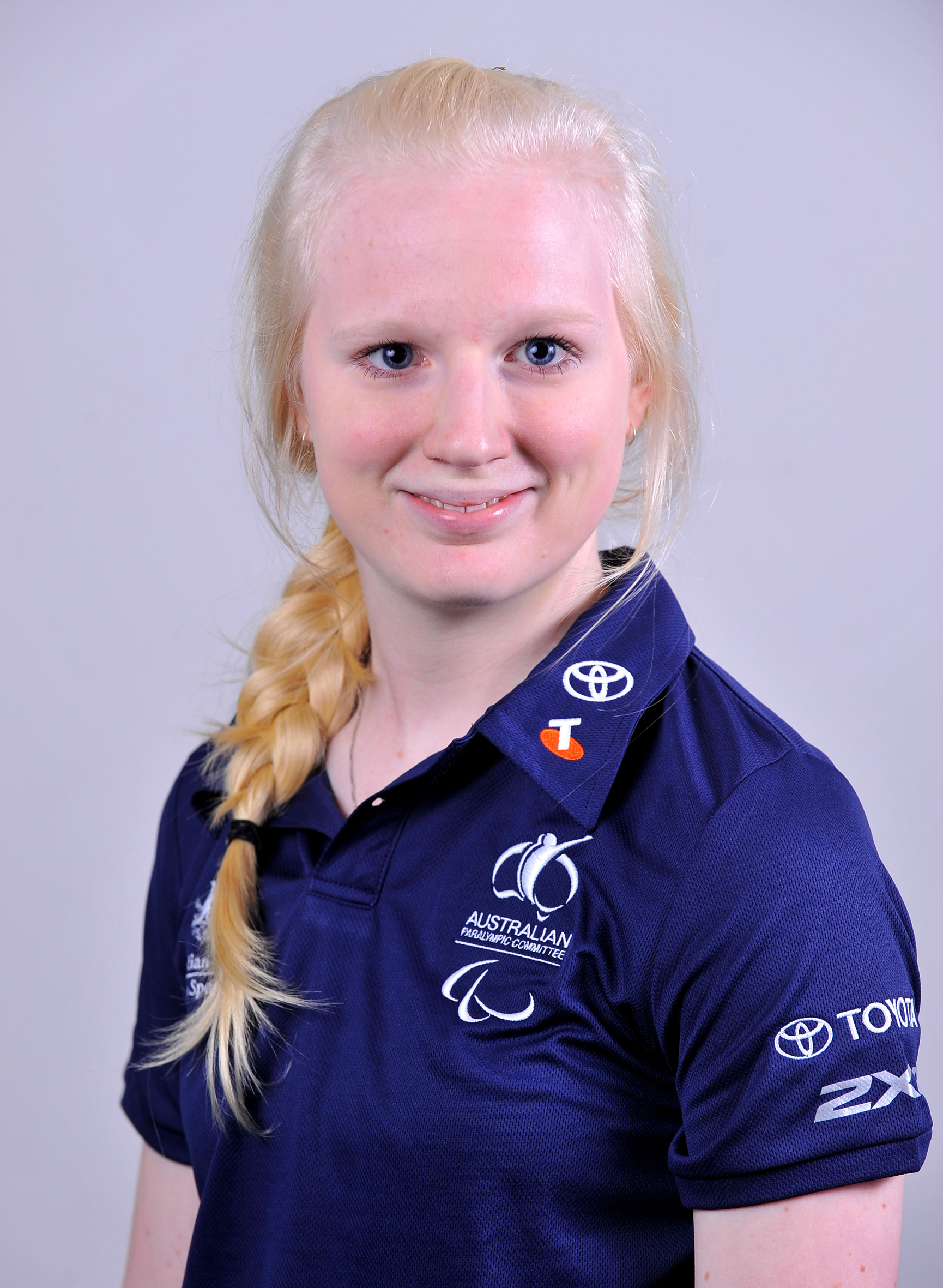
Jennifer Blow

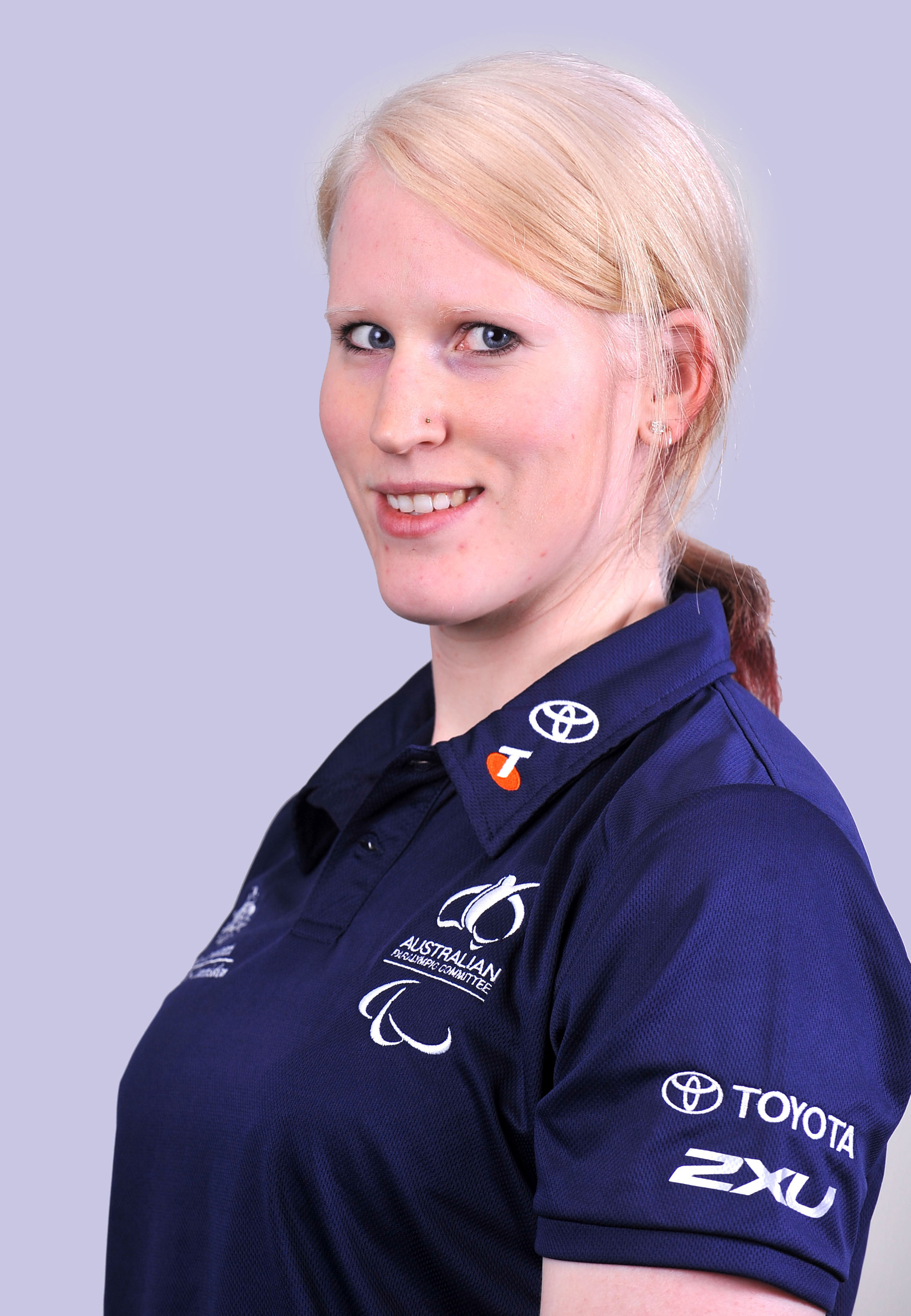
Meica Christensen

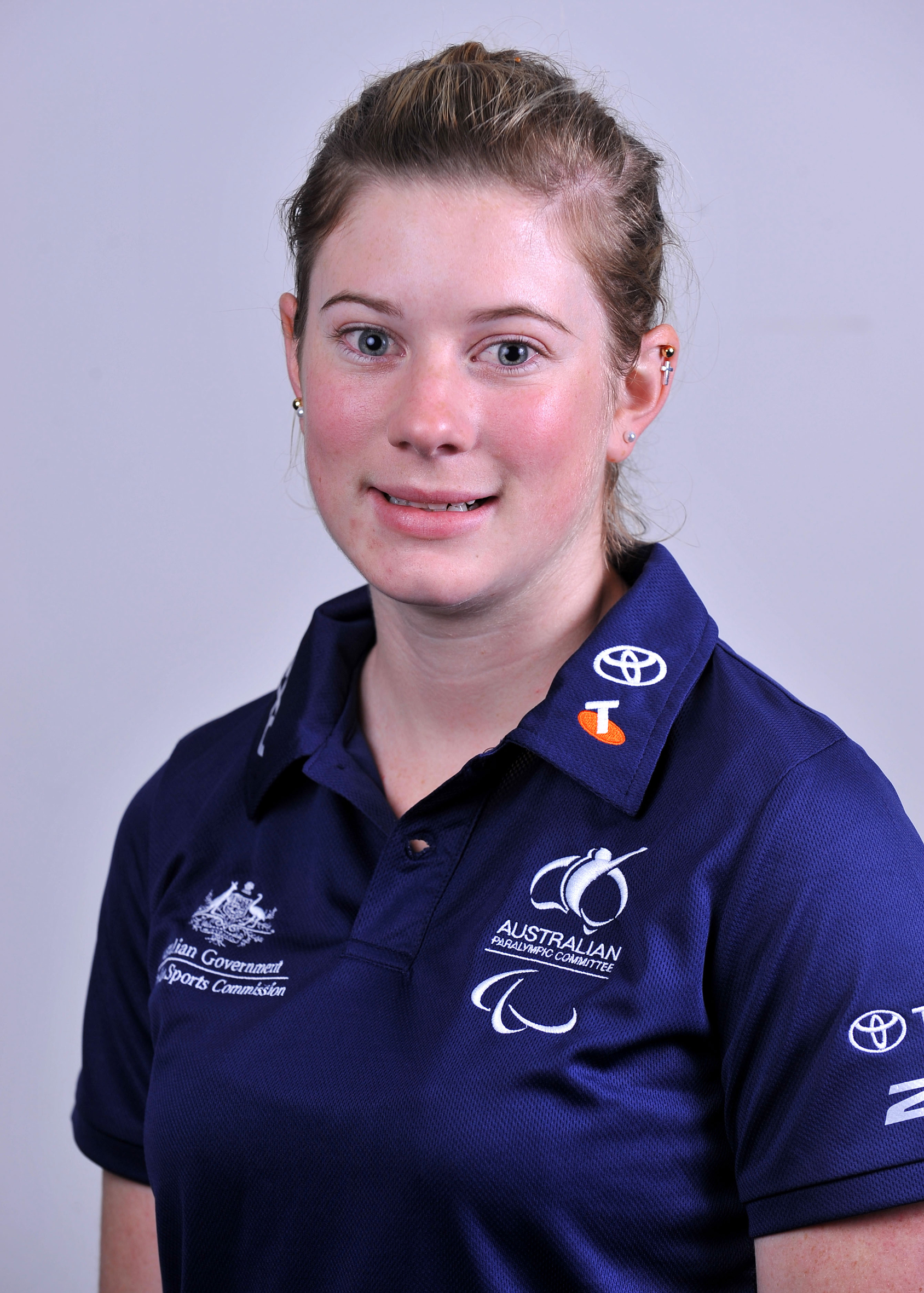
Tyan Taylor

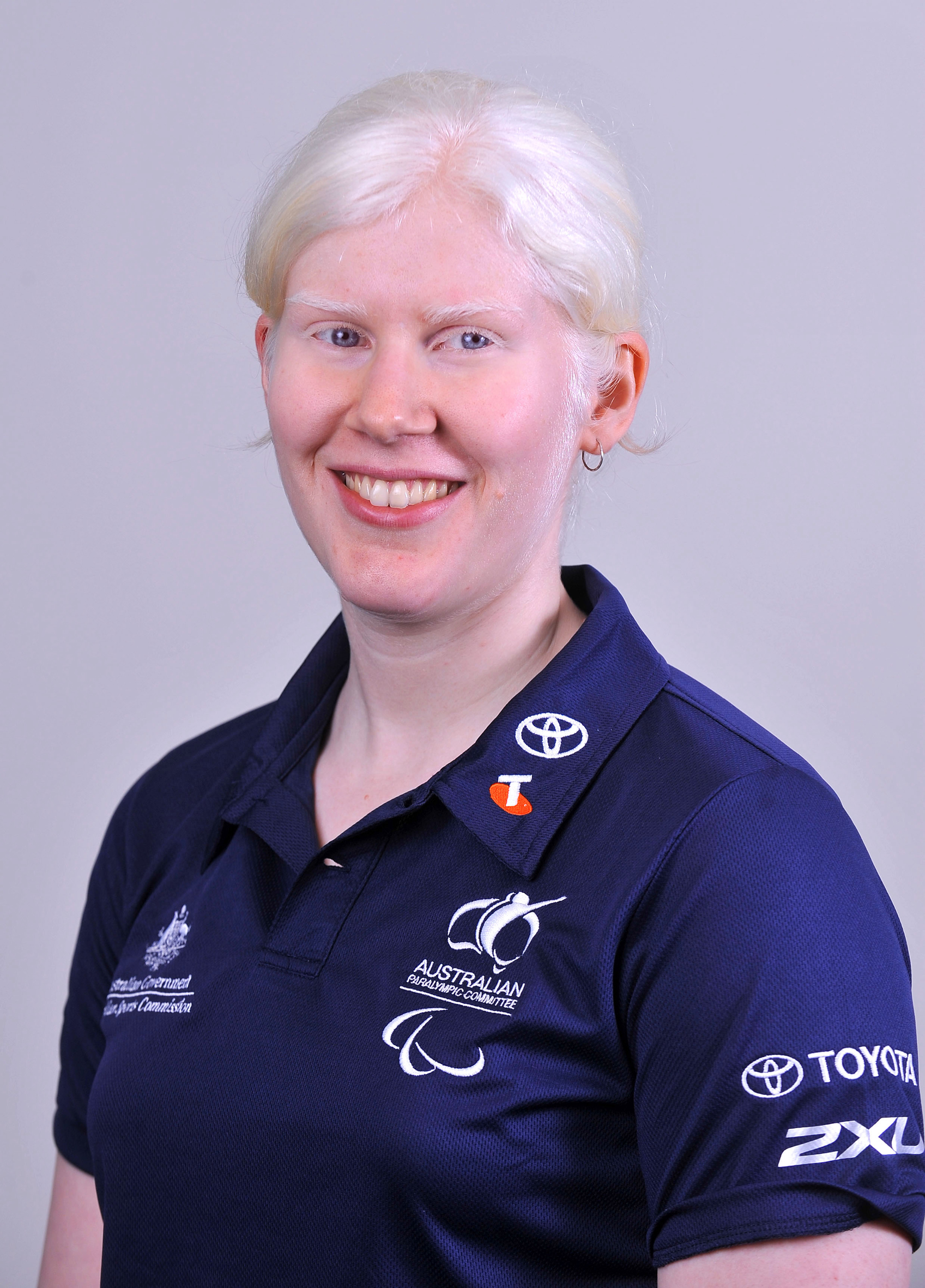
Nicole Esdaile

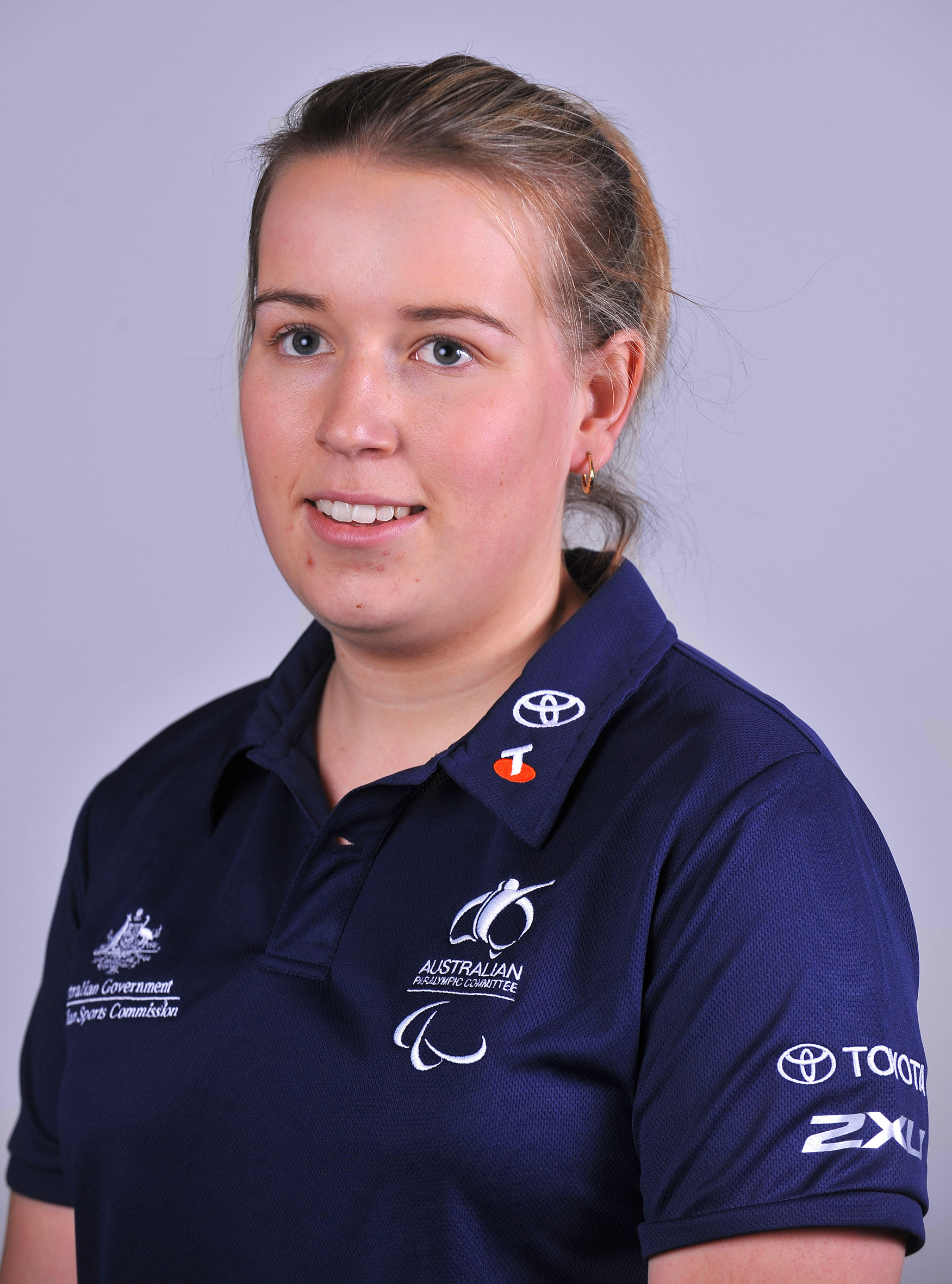
Rachel Henderson

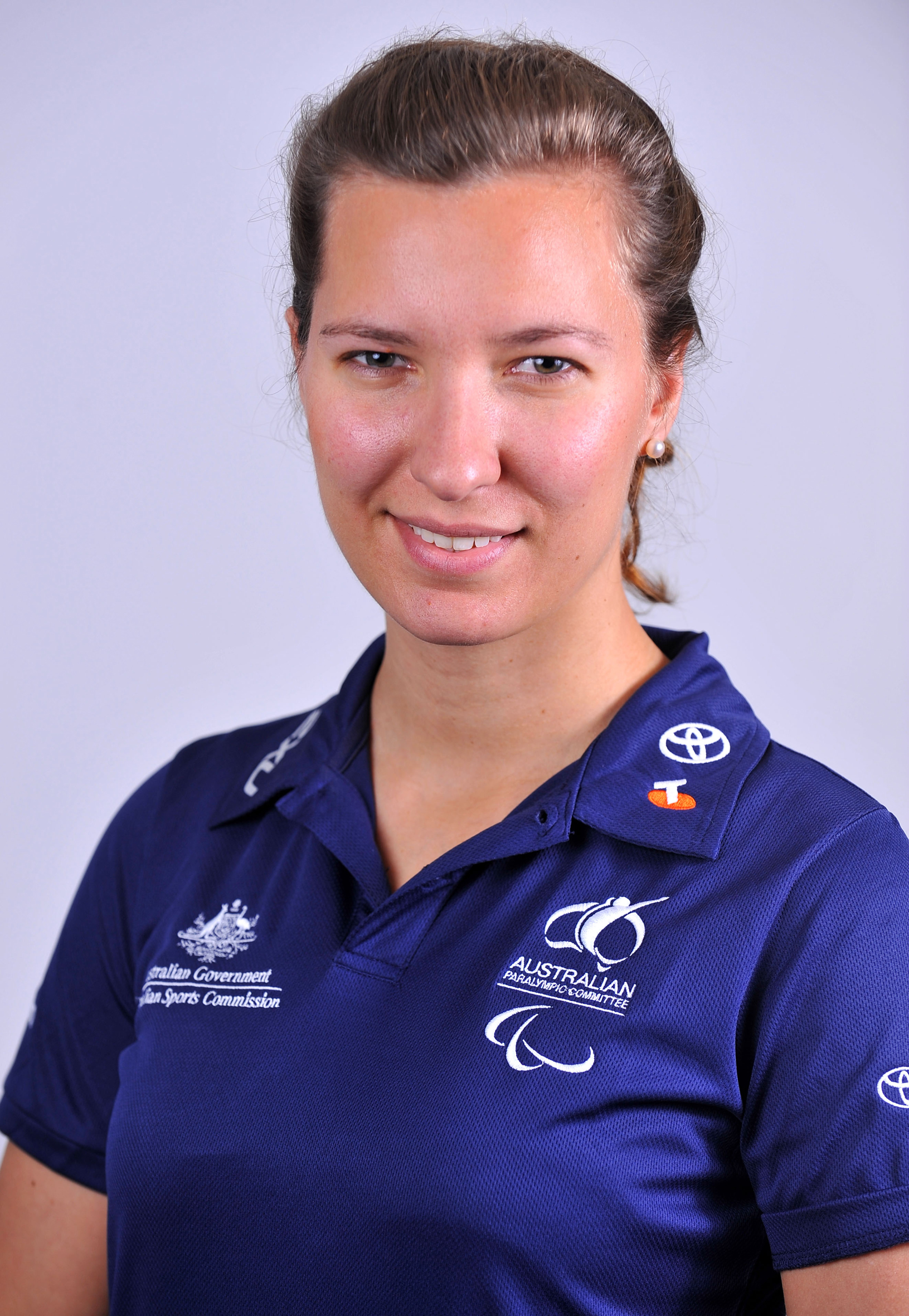
Michelle Rzepecki

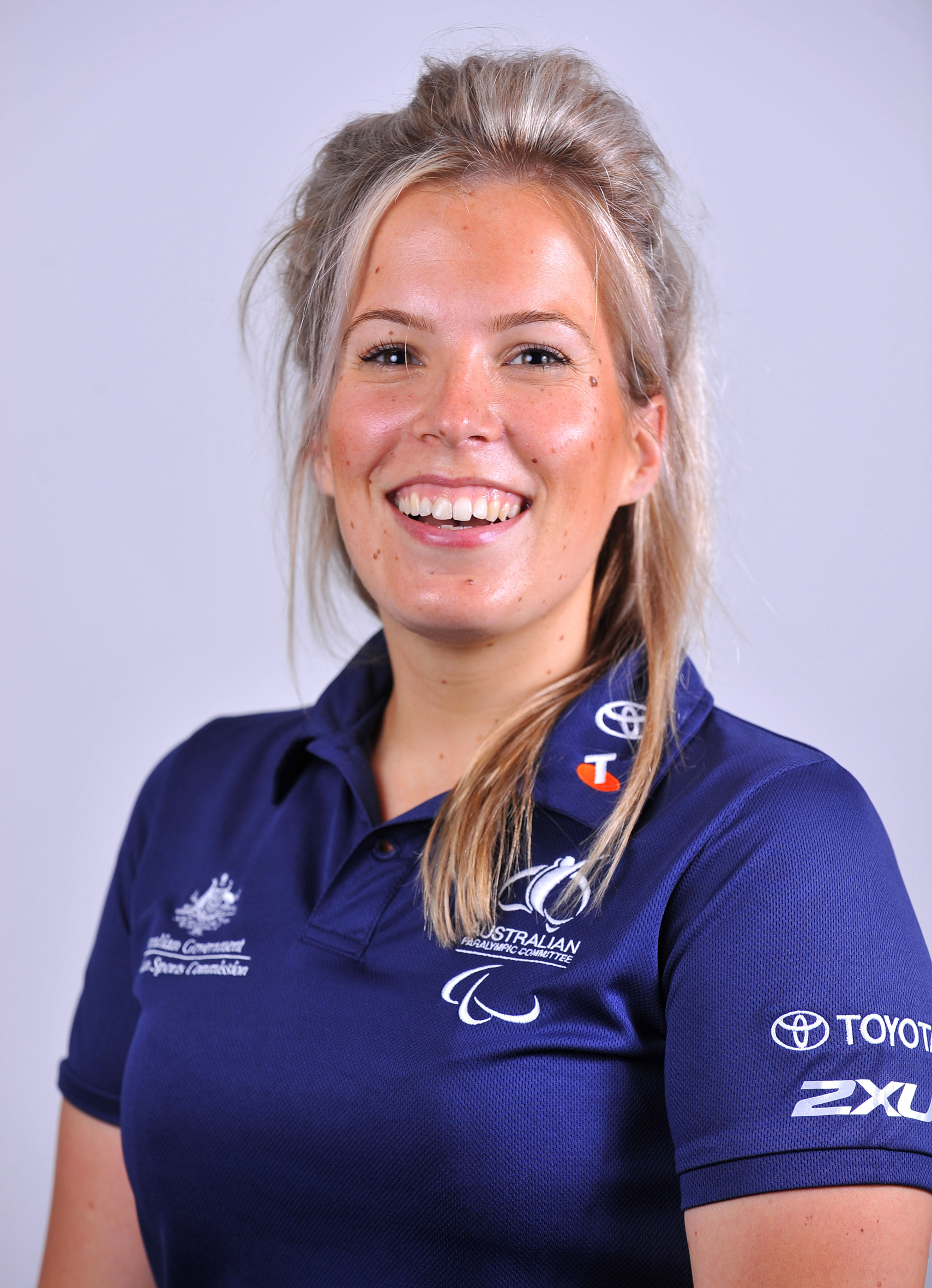
Coach: Georgina Kenaghan

== Competitions ==
The Belles came into the 2011–12 Paralympic qualifying season having finished eighth at the 2010 IBSA Goalball World Championship. They competed in three events during 2011–12: the 2011 IBSA Goalball World Games, the 2011 IBSA Africa-Oceania Goalball Regional Championships and the 2012 Summer Paralympics.

=== 2011 IBSA Goalball World Games ===
Australia's first attempt to qualify for the London Paralympics came in April 2011 at the IBSA Goalball World Games, which were held in Antalya, Turkey. The Belles finished in sixth place, with Canada and Finland taking the two automatic qualifying spots. Playing in Pool X, Australia defeated Spain 7–1, and lost to Canada 3–6 in games on 4 April. The following day, they beat Germany 8–6. Then, on 6 April, they tied with Hungary 5–5. The following day, they beat Israel 6–5, and on 8 April, beat South Korea 8–3. They finished second in their pool with 13 points, which was 5 points behind Canada and one point ahead of Israel. In their 9 April placement game against Russia, they lost 3–6, and in their 5th to 8th placement game against Spain, they won 8–7. In the game against Israel for fifth place, they lost 6–8.

=== 2011 IBSA Africa-Oceania Goalball Regional Championships ===
The 2011 IBSA Africa-Oceania Goalball Regional Championships in Sydney were the last opportunity for the team to qualify for the London Paralympic Games. Only Australia and New Zealand were competing in the women's event, so Australia only had to play two games: a semi-final and final against the New Zealand women's national goalball team. The team included Christensen, who captained the team during the competition, Blow, Esdaile, Henderson, Taylor and Rzepecki. In the semi-final, the Belles took a 7–1 lead into the half time break, and went on to win 11–4. Christensen scored 7 of Australia's goals, while Esdaile scored 3 and Taylor scored one. When the Australian women played New Zealand again in the final, they beating them a second time, by 6–2, with Christensen scoring three goals, Esdaile scoring two and Taylor scoring one.

In May 2012, the team was ranked eighth in the world, a position they continued to hold going into the London Games. The Belles became the first Australian team to qualify for the Games since 1996, despite attempts to qualify for the 2004 Summer Paralympics and 2008 Summer Paralympics; Australia had qualified automatically for the 2000 Summer Paralympics as the host nation.

=== Paralympics ===
At the 2012 Summer Paralympics Games in London, their pool included China, the United States, Sweden, Japan and Canada, with the United States and Chinese team reigning gold silver medallists respectively from Goalball at the 2008 Summer Paralympics. Australia lost their first game to Japan 1–3. Esdaile scored the team's only goal, which came off a penalty throw. Esdaile, Taylor and Christensen were the only players in the game for Australia, with 28 throws for Taylor, 30 throws for Esdaile and 38 throws for Christensen. They lost their second game to Canada 1–3. Christensen scored the team's only goal, which again came off a penalty throw. She and Esdaile once more played for the whole game, with Blow playing 14 minutes and Taylor playing 10 minutes. Christensen finished the game with 41 throws, Esdaile with 32, Taylor with 11 and Blow with 2. Esdaile led the team with blocks, having 45 to Christensen's 18, Blow's 10 and Taylor's 8. The Belles lost their third game to the United States 0–3. Christensen and Esdaile again played the whole game, with Blow playing 20 minutes, Taylor playing 3 minutes and Rzepecki playing just one minute. Esdaile led the team in throws and blocks with 45 and 33 respectively, while Christensen had 40 and 21, and Blow had 3 throws and 27 blocks. Taylor had 5 throws and 3 blocks, and Rzepecki had 1 throw and no blocks. The Australian women lost their last game to Sweden 5–8. In this last game in pool play, every player got minutesm with Christensen and Esdaile again playing the whole 24 minutes, Blow playing for 9 minutes, Taylor for 10, Henderson for 2 and Rzepecki for 3. Esdaile scored three goals, with Christensen scoring the remaining two, one of which came off a penalty throw. Christensen led the team in throws with 40, while Esdaile had 32, Taylor had 9, Blow had 3 and Henderson and Rzepecki had 2 each. Esdaile led the team in blocks with 29 to Christensen's 14, Blow's 12, Taylor's 9, Rzepecki's 1 and Henderson's 0. One of Sweden's goals was an Australian own goal scored by Rzepecki.

=== Group play ===
Team	Pld	W	D	L	GF	GA	GD	Pts	Qualification
Canada	4	3	0	1	6	3	+3	9	Quarterfinals
Japan	4	2	1	1	5	3	+2	7	Quarterfinals
Sweden	4	2	1	1	11	11	0	7	Quarterfinals
United States	4	2	0	2	9	4	+5	6	Quarterfinals
Australia	4	0	0	4	7	17	−10	0	Eliminated

Source: "London 2012 Paralympic Games - Goalball results" (PDF). Paralympic.org. 2012-10-03 – via Goalball.sport.

31 August 2012; 09:00	Australia	1 – 3	Japan	Copper Box, London; Referees: Hooshang Shariati (IRI), Yasser Omar (EGY)
31 August 2012; 09:00	Esdaile 1	Report	Adacho 2 Komiya 1	Copper Box, London; Referees: Hooshang Shariati (IRI), Yasser Omar (EGY)

2 September 2012; 10:15	Australia	1 – 3	Canada	Copper Box, London; Referees: Juha Vuokila (FIN), Dina Murdie (GBR)
2 September 2012; 10:15	Christensen 1	Report	Kneebone 2 Morin 1	Copper Box, London; Referees: Juha Vuokila (FIN), Dina Murdie (GBR)

3 September 2012; 18:30	United States	3 – 0	Australia	Copper Box, London; Referees: Thomas Baerz (GER), Bulent Kimyon (TUR)
3 September 2012; 18:30	Armbruster 3	Report		Copper Box, London; Referees: Thomas Baerz (GER), Bulent Kimyon (TUR)

4 September 2012; 12:30	Sweden	8 – 5	Australia	Copper Box, London; Referees: Hooshang Shariati (IRI), Janne Ahokas (FIN)
4 September 2012; 12:30	Gustavsson 5 Naesström 2 Jälmestål 1	Report	Esdaile 3 Christensen 2	Copper Box, London; Referees: Hooshang Shariati (IRI), Janne Ahokas (FIN)

=== Qualifying and Paralympic goals summary ===
Competition	Team	Final score	Date	Player	Goals scored	Ref
2011 IBSA Africa-Oceania Goalball Regional Championships	New Zealand	11–4	16-Nov-11	Christensen	7	
2011 IBSA Africa-Oceania Goalball Regional Championships	New Zealand	11–4	16-Nov-11	Esdaile	3	
2011 IBSA Africa-Oceania Goalball Regional Championships	New Zealand	11–4	16-Nov-11	Taylor	1	
2011 IBSA Africa-Oceania Goalball Regional Championships	New Zealand	6–2	17-Nov-11	Christensen	3	
2011 IBSA Africa-Oceania Goalball Regional Championships	New Zealand	6–2	17-Nov-11	Esdaile	2	
2011 IBSA Africa-Oceania Goalball Regional Championships	New Zealand	6–2	17-Nov-11	Taylor	1	
2012 Summer Paralympics	Japan	1–3	31-Aug-12	Esdaile	1	
2012 Summer Paralympics	Canada	1–3	2-Sep-12	Christensen	1	
2012 Summer Paralympics	Sweden	5–8	4-Sep-12	Esdaile	3	
2012 Summer Paralympics	Sweden	5–8	4-Sep-12	Christensen	2	
