= Georgina Kenaghan =

Australian female goalball coach

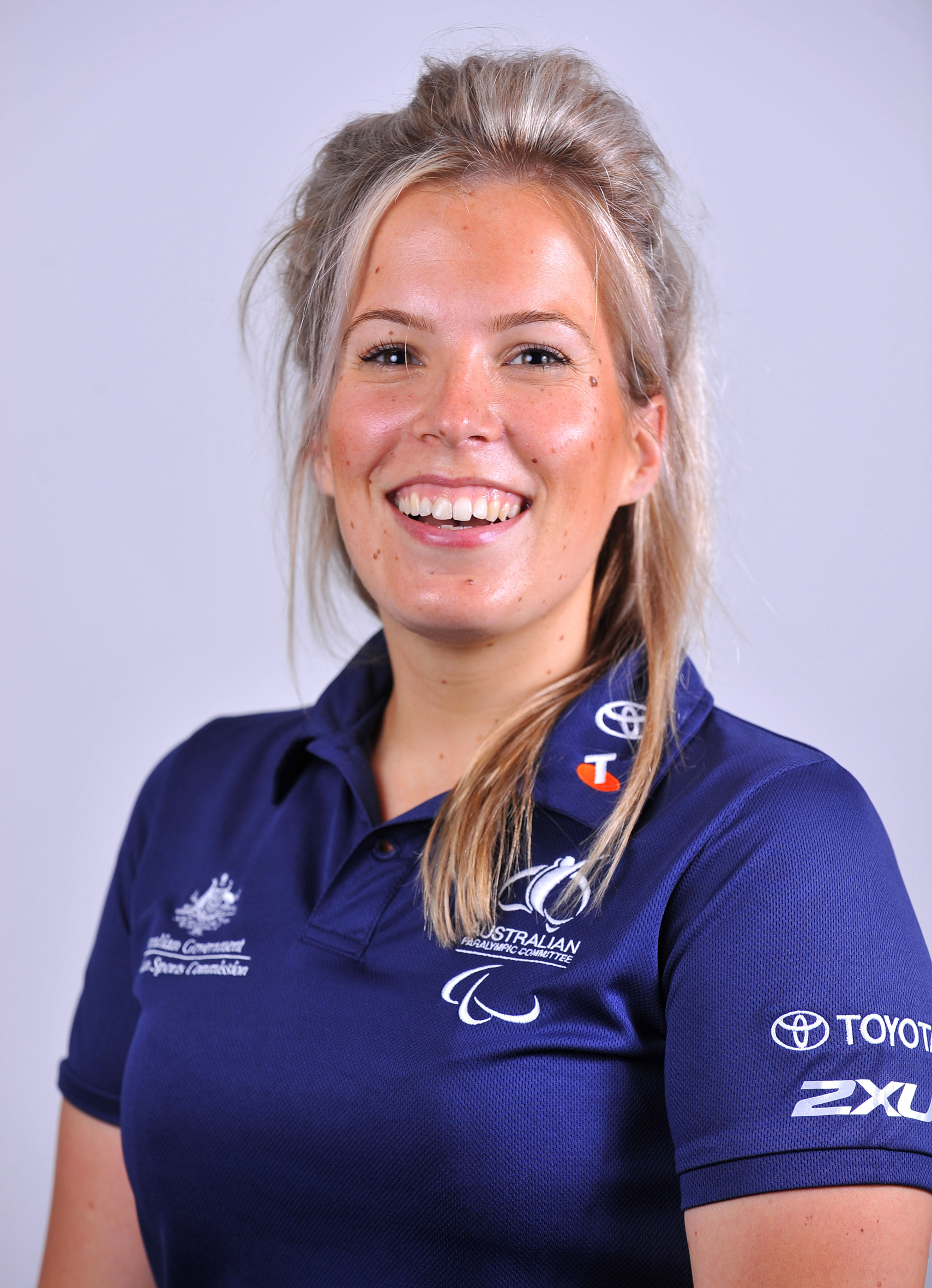
- 2012 Australian Paralympic Team portrait of Kenaghan

Personal information
- Nationality: Australian
- Born: 1984 (age 41–42)

Sport
- Country: Australia
- Sport: Goalball
- Now coaching: Australia women's national goalball team

Georgina Kenaghan (born 1984) is an Australian goalball coach. She won the 2012 NSW/ACT Inspiration Medal in the Pride of Australia Awards. As the coach of the Australia women's national goalball team, she led the team at the 2010 World Championships in Great Britain, the first time the national team had competed internationally in three years. She coached the team at the 2011 IBSA Goalball Continental Championships and Paralympic Qualifier, and was the national team coach for Australia at the 2012 Summer Paralympics, where the team did not win a single game.

== Personal ==
Kenaghan took leave from her job to prepare for the 2012 Paralympics when she was 28 years old. Her father is Terry Kenaghan, the man who helped bring goalball to Australia in 1980. In 2012, Peter Corr nominated her for an Inspiration Medal in the Pride of Australia Awards. She won the NSW/ACT Award. Her father accepted the award on her behalf as she was in London at the time, coaching the national team.

== Goalball ==
Kenaghan coaches the Australia women's national goalball team. The Daily Telegraph called her "one of Australia's most successful sports coaches".

She coached the team at the 2010 World Championships in Great Britain, the first time the national team had played in three years. In 2011, she represented goalball as part of a "Come & Try Day" sporting event in Western Australia. She used the 2011 Australian National Goalball competition as an opportunity to evaluate national team players. In 2011, she coached the Australian side at the IBSA Goalball Continental Championships and Paralympic Qualifier and guided the team to a 6–2 win over the New Zealand women's national goalball team to secure Paralympic qualification. She coached the team in their win against Israel that was part of the competition.

Kenaghan was the head coach of the Aussie Belles going to the 2012 Summer Paralympics. The team qualifying for the Games was a surprise as the Australian Paralympic Committee had been working on player development with an idea of the team qualifying for the 2016 Summer Paralympics. An Australian team had not participated since the 2000 Summer Paralympics when they earned an automatic selection as hosts and the team finished last in the competition. The country has not medalled in the event since 1976. Players she coached on the national team included Meica Christensen. Her team lost all three games and did not advance out of the group stage. In the team's game against Canada, she substituted players in order to improve the team's chance of winning.
