= Wheelchair tennis at the 2015 Parapan American Games – Women's singles =

Women's singles
- Wheelchair tennis at the 2015 Parapan American Games

Final
- Champion: Natália Mayara (BRA)
- Runner-up: Kaitlyn Verfuerth (USA)
- Score: 7-6(4), 6–2

Events
| Singles | men | women |
| Doubles | men | women |
| ← 2011 · | Parapan American Games | · 2019 → |

The women's singles wheelchair tennis tournament at the 2015 Parapan American Games took place from August 8 to 14, 2015 at the University of Toronto Scarborough Tennis Centre in Toronto, Canada. Twelve athletes from six countries competed in this event.

== Main draw ==
=== Key ===
- Q = Qualifier
- WC = Wild card
- LL = Lucky loser
- Alt = Alternate
- SE = Special exempt
- PR = Protected ranking
- ITF = ITF entry
- JE = Junior exempt
- w/o = Walkover
- r = Retired
- d = Defaulted
- SR = Special ranking

=== Finals ===
Semifinals
Kaitlyn Verfuerth (USA) | 6 | 6
Francisca Mardones (CHI) | 4 | 1
Natália Mayara (BRA) | 6(4) | 6 | 7
Emmy Kaiser (USA) | 7 | 2 | 5

Final (gold medal match)
Kaitlyn Verfuerth (USA) | 6(4) | 2
Natália Mayara (BRA) | 7 | 6
Bronze medal match
Francisca Mardones (CHI) | 1 | 1
Emmy Kaiser (USA) | 6 | 6
