= Wheelchair tennis at the 2011 Parapan American Games – Women's singles =

Women's singles
- Wheelchair tennis at the 2011 Parapan American Games

Final
- Champion: Mackenzie Soldan (USA)
- Runner-up: Mary Kaiser (USA)
- Score: 1–6, 6–4, 6–4

Events
Singles	men	women
Doubles	men	women
← 2007 ·	Parapan American Games	· 2015 →

The women's singles tournament of wheelchair tennis at the 2011 Parapan American Games was held from November 13 to 16 at the Telcel Tennis Complex in Guadalajara.

== Draw ==
=== Key ===
- Q = Qualifier
- WC = Wild card
- LL = Lucky loser
- Alt = Alternate
- ITF = ITF entry
- PR = Protected ranking
- SR = Special ranking
- SE = Special exempt
- JE = Junior exempt
- JR = Junior Accelerator Programme entrant
- CO = College Accelerator Programme entrant
- NG = Next Gen Accelerator Program entrant
- w/o = Walkover
- r = Retired
- d = Defaulted

=== Finals ===
Semifinals
Angélica Bernal (COL)	1	6^{5}
Mary Kaiser (USA)	6	7^{7}
Francisca Mardones (CHI)	5	4
Mackenzie Soldan (USA)	7	6

Final
Mary Kaiser (USA)	6	4	4
Mackenzie Soldan (USA)	1	6	6
Bronze medal match
Angélica Bernal (COL)	6	6
Francisca Mardones (CHI)	4	2

=== Top half ===
First round
A Bernal (COL)	6	4	6
A Medrano (ARG)	4	6	4
WC	E Belmont (MEX)	4	1
N Mayara (BRA)	6	6

Quarterfinals
MA Ortiz (CHI)	6	3	3
A Bernal (COL)	4	6	6
M Kaiser (USA)	6	6
N Mayara (BRA)	0	1

Semifinals
A Bernal (COL)	1	6^{5}
M Kaiser (USA)	6	7^{7}

=== Bottom half ===
First round
L Castillo (PER)
WC	R Candida (BRA)	w/o
M Soldan (USA)	6	6	6
WC	C Taboada (MEX)	7	4	2

Quarterfinals
WC	R Candida (BRA)	4	6
F Mardones (CHI)	6	7
M Soldan (USA)	1	6	6
J Martínez (COL)	6	0	2

Semifinals
F Mardones (CHI)	5	4
M Soldan (USA)	7	6

== Consolation draw ==
Semifinals
A Medrano (ARG)	4	2
E Belmont (MEX)	6	6
L Castillo (PER)	2	0
C Taboada (MEX)	6	6

Final
E Belmont (MEX)	2	6^{5}
C Taboada (MEX)	6	7^{7}
