= Wheelchair tennis at the 2011 Parapan American Games – Women's doubles =

Women's doubles
- Wheelchair tennis at the 2011 Parapan American Games

Final
- Champion: Mary Kaiser (United States) Mackenzie Soldan (USA)
- Runner-up: Angélica Bernal (Colombia) Johana Martínez (COL)
- Score: 6–3, 6–0

Events
Singles	men	women
Doubles	men	women
← 2007 ·	Parapan American Games	· 2015 →

The women's doubles tournament of wheelchair tennis at the 2011 Parapan American Games will be held from November 13 to 16 at the Telcel Tennis Complex in Guadalajara.

== Draw ==
=== Key ===
- Q = Qualifier
- WC = Wild card
- LL = Lucky loser
- Alt = Alternate
- ITF = ITF entry
- PR = Protected ranking
- SR = Special ranking
- SE = Special exempt
- JE = Junior exempt
- JR = Junior Accelerator Programme entrant
- CO = College Accelerator Programme entrant
- NG = Next Gen Accelerator Program entrant
- w/o = Walkover
- r = Retired
- d = Defaulted

=== Finals ===
Semifinals
Francisca Mardones (Chile) Maria Antonieta Ortiz (CHI)	4	6	4
Mary Kaiser (United States) Mackenzie Soldan (USA)	6	3	6
Angélica Bernal (Colombia) Johana Martínez (COL)	6	6
Rejane Candida (Brazil) Natalia Mayara (BRA)	1	0

Final
Mary Kaiser (United States) Mackenzie Soldan (USA)	6	6
Angélica Bernal (Colombia) Johana Martínez (COL)	3	0
Bronze medal match
Francisca Mardones (Chile) Maria Antonieta Ortiz (CHI)	6	6
Rejane Candida (Brazil) Natalia Mayara (BRA)	4	4

=== Top half ===
Quarterfinals			Semifinals
			F Mardones (Chile) MA Ortiz (CHI)	4	6	4
E Belmont (Mexico) C Taboada (MEX)	3	0	M Kaiser (United States) M Soldan (USA)	6	3	6
M Kaiser (United States) M Soldan (USA)	6	6
