= Wheelchair tennis at the 2011 Parapan American Games – Men's doubles =

Men's doubles
- Wheelchair tennis at the 2011 Parapan American Games

Final
- Champion: Jon Rydberg (United States) Stephen Welch (USA)
- Runner-up: Gustavo Fernandez (Argentina) Augustín Ledesma (ARG)
- Score: 6–2, 6–2

Events
Singles	men	women
Doubles	men	women
← 2007 ·	Parapan American Games	· 2015 →

The men's doubles tournament of wheelchair tennis at the 2011 Parapan American Games will be held from November 13 to 16 at the Telcel Tennis Complex in Guadalajara.

== Draw ==
=== Key ===
- Q = Qualifier
- WC = Wild card
- LL = Lucky loser
- Alt = Alternate
- ITF = ITF entry
- PR = Protected ranking
- SR = Special ranking
- SE = Special exempt
- JE = Junior exempt
- JR = Junior Accelerator Programme entrant
- CO = College Accelerator Programme entrant
- NG = Next Gen Accelerator Program entrant
- w/o = Walkover
- r = Retired
- d = Defaulted

=== Finals ===
Semifinals
Gustavo Fernandez (Argentina) Augustín Ledesma (ARG)	6	6
Maurício Pommê (Brazil) Carlos Santos (BRA)	4	4
Eliecer Oquendo (Colombia) Mauricio Vega (COL)	2	3
Jon Rydberg (United States) Stephen Welch (USA)	6	6

Final
Gustavo Fernandez (Argentina) Augustín Ledesma (ARG)	2	3
Jon Rydberg (United States) Stephen Welch (USA)	6	6
Bronze medal match
Maurício Pommê (Brazil) Carlos Santos (BRA)	7	6
Eliecer Oquendo (Colombia) Mauricio Vega (COL)	5	1

=== Top half ===
First round			Quarterfinals				Semifinals
			G Fernandez (Argentina) A Ledesma (ARG)	3	6	6
R Avila (Mexico) M Bautista (MEX)	1	4	C Aranda (Chile) R Mendez (CHI)	6	3	3
C Aranda (Chile) R Mendez (CHI)	6	6					G Fernandez (Argentina) A Ledesma (ARG)	6	6
							M Pommê (Brazil) C Santos (BRA)	4	4
			M Pommê (Brazil) C Santos (BRA)	6	6
			E Cabrera (Ecuador) E Merizalde (ECU)	3	0

=== Bottom half ===
First round			Quarterfinals			Semifinals
			A Alvarez (Peru) R Delgado (PER)	1	0
			E Oquendo (Colombia) M Vega (COL)	6	6
						E Oquendo (Colombia) M Vega (COL)	2	3
M Lucero (El Salvador) C Rivera (ESA)	2	0				J Rydberg (United States) S Welch (USA)	6	6
P Bedard (Canada) J Dembe (CAN)	6	6	P Bedard (Canada) J Dembe (CAN)	4	3
			J Rydberg (United States) S Welch (USA)	6	6
