= Wheelchair tennis at the 2011 Parapan American Games – Men's singles =

Men's singles
- Wheelchair tennis at the 2011 Parapan American Games

Final
- Champion: Gustavo Fernandez (ARG)
- Runner-up: Augustín Ledesma (ARG)
- Score: 6–2, 6–2

Events
| Singles | men | women |
| Doubles | men | women |
| ← 2007 · | Parapan American Games | · 2015 → |

The men's singles tournament of wheelchair tennis at the 2011 Parapan American Games will be held from November 13 to 16 at the Telcel Tennis Complex in Guadalajara.

== Main draw ==
=== Key ===
- Q = Qualifier
- WC = Wild card
- LL = Lucky loser
- Alt = Alternate
- ITF = ITF entry
- PR = Protected ranking
- SR = Special ranking
- SE = Special exempt
- JE = Junior exempt
- JR = Junior Accelerator Programme entrant
- CO = College Accelerator Programme entrant
- NG = Next Gen Accelerator Program entrant
- w/o = Walkover
- r = Retired
- d = Defaulted

=== Finals ===
Semifinals
Gustavo Fernandez (ARG) | 6 | 6
Robinson Méndez (CHI) | 1 | 4
Augustín Ledesma (ARG) | 7^{7} | 6
Stephen Welch (USA) | 6^{3} | 3

Final (gold medal match)
Gustavo Fernandez (ARG) | 6 | 6
Augustín Ledesma (ARG) | 2 | 2
Bronze medal match
Robinson Méndez (CHI) | 0 | 3
Stephen Welch (USA) | 6 | 6

=== Top half ===
First round
E Cabrera (ECU) | 0 | 2
J Dembe (CAN) | 6 | 6
A Alvarez (PER) | 0 | 2
J Rydberg (USA) | 6 | 6
O Marrero (PUR) | 6 | 6
WC | OE Oliva (GUA) | 0 | 2
WC | M Bautista (MEX) | 6 | 6
WC | M Lucero (ESA) | 3 | 0

Second round
G Fernandez (ARG) | 6 | 6
J Dembe (CAN) | 2 | 1
J Rydberg (USA) | 6 | 6
WC | D Rodrigues (BRA) | 2 | 2
R Méndez (CHI) | 6 | 6
O Marrero (PUR) | 0 | 0
WC | M Bautista (MEX) | 0 | 0
E Oquendo (COL) | 6 | 6

Quarterfinals
G Fernandez (ARG) | 6 | 6
J Rydberg (USA) | 4 | 2
R Méndez (CHI) | 6 | 6
E Oquendo (COL) | 2 | 4

Semifinals
G Fernandez (ARG) | 6 | 6
R Méndez (CHI) | 1 | 4

=== Bottom half ===
First round
M Vega (COL) | 6 | 7
R Delgado (PER) | 2 | 5
P Bedard (CAN) | 5 | 1
C Aranda (CHI) | 7 | 6
WC | E Merizalde (ECU) | 3 | 6 | 6
WC | C Rivera (ESA) | 6 | 4 | 4
E Rodriguez (URU) | 2 | 4
WC | R Avila (MEX) | 6 | 6

Second round
A Ledesma (ARG) | 6 | 6
M Vega (COL) | 2 | 3
C Aranda (CHI) | 7 | 0 | 4
C Santos (BRA) | 6 | 6 | 6
M Pommê (BRA) | 6 | 6
WC | E Merizalde (ECU) | 0 | 0
WC | R Avila (MEX) | 5 | 3
S Welch (USA) | 7 | 6

Quarterfinals
A Ledesma (ARG) | 7 | 7
C Santos (BRA) | 5 | 5
M Pommê (BRA) | 2 | 6
S Welch (USA) | 6 | 7

Semifinals
A Ledesma (ARG) | 7^{7} | 6
S Welch (USA) | 6^{3} | 3

== Consolation draw ==
Quarterfinals
M Lucero (ESA) | 3 | 6^{4}
OE Oliva (GUA) | 6 | 7^{7}
E Cabrera (ECU) | 6 | 6
C Rivera (ESA) | 2 | 1
R Delgado (PER) | 6 | 6
E Rodriguez (URU) | 2 | 2

Semifinals
A Alvarez (PER) | 6 | 6
OE Oliva (GUA) | 4 | 1
E Cabrera (ECU) | 6 | 6
R Delgado (PER) | 2 | 2

Final
A Alvarez (PER) | 0 | 2
E Cabrera (ECU) | 6 | 6
