= Wheelchair tennis at the 2011 Parapan American Games =

- Date: November 13–18
- Edition: 3rd
- Location: Telcel Tennis Complex

Champions

Men's singles
- Gustavo Fernández (ARG)

Women's singles
- Mackenzie Soldan (USA)

Men's doubles
- Jon Rydberg / Stephen Welch (USA)

Women's doubles
- Mary Kaiser / Mackenzie Soldan (USA)
← 2007 ·	Parapan American Games	· 2015 →

Wheelchair tennis was contested at the 2011 Parapan American Games from November 13 to 18 at the Telcel Tennis Complex in Guadalajara, Mexico.

== Medal summary ==
=== Medal table ===
Rank	Nation	Gold	Silver	Bronze	Total
1	United States	3	1	1	5
2	Argentina	1	2	0	3
3	Colombia	0	1	1	2
4	Brazil	0	0	1	1
4	Chile	0	0	1	1
Totals (5 entries)		4	4	4	12

=== Medal events ===
Event	Gold	Silver	Bronze
Men's singles	Gustavo Fernández; Argentina	Augustín Ledesma; Argentina	Stephen Welch; United States
Women's singles	Mackenzie Soldan; United States	Mary Kaiser; United States	Angélica Bernal; Colombia
Men's doubles	United States (USA); Jon Rydberg; Stephen Welch	Argentina (ARG); Gustavo Fernández; Agustín Ledesma	Brazil (BRA); Mauricio Pommé; Carlos Santos
Women's doubles	United States (USA); Mary Kaiser; Mackenzie Soldan	Colombia (COL); Angélica Bernal; Johana Martínez	Chile (CHI); Francisca Mardones; Maria Antonieta Ortiz
