= 2005 US Open – Wheelchair women's doubles =

Wheelchair women's doubles
- 2005 US Open

Final
- Champion: (Netherlands) Korie Homan (Netherlands) Esther Vergeer
- Runner-up: (United States) Beth Arnoult (United States) Jan Proctor
- Score: 6–3, 6–1

Events
Singles	men	women		boys	girls
Doubles	men	women	mixed	boys	girls
WC Singles	men	women	quad
WC Doubles	men	women	quad
Legends	men	women	mixed
US Open	· 2006 →

Korie Homan and Esther Vergeer defeated Beth Arnoult and Jan Proctor in the final, 6–3, 6–1 to win the inaugural women's doubles wheelchair tennis title at the 2005 US Open.

== Draw ==
=== Key ===
- Q = Qualifier
- WC = Wild card
- LL = Lucky loser
- Alt = Alternate
- ITF = ITF entry
- PR = Protected ranking
- SR = Special ranking
- SE = Special exempt
- JE = Junior exempt
- JR = Junior Accelerator Programme entrant
- CO = College Accelerator Programme entrant
- NG = Next Gen Accelerator Program entrant
- w/o = Walkover
- r = Retired
- d = Defaulted

=== Finals ===
Semifinal
(Netherlands) Korie Homan (Netherlands) Esther Vergeer	7	7
(United States) Karin Korb (United States) Kaitlyn Verfuerth	6	6
(Netherlands) Sonja Peters (United States) Elizabeth Williams	7	3	3
(United States) Beth Arnoult (United States) Jan Proctor	6	6	6

Final
(Netherlands) Korie Homan (Netherlands) Esther Vergeer	6	6
(United States) Beth Arnoult (United States) Jan Proctor	3	1
