= 2010 PBZ Zagreb Indoors – Singles =

Singles
- 2010 PBZ Zagreb Indoors

Final
- Champion: (Croatia) Marin Čilić
- Runner-up: (Germany) Michael Berrer
- Score: 6–4, 6–7^{(5–7)}, 6–3

Events
Singles	Doubles
- PBZ Zagreb Indoors

Marin Čilić defend his 2009 title and he won in the final 6–4, 6–7^{(5–7)}, 6–3, against Michael Berrer.

== Seeds ==
1. (Croatia) Marin Čilić (champion)
2. (Croatia) Ivan Ljubičić (second round)
3. (Austria) Jürgen Melzer (semifinals)
4. (Serbia) Viktor Troicki (quarterfinals)
5. (Serbia) Janko Tipsarević (first round)
6. (Germany) Benjamin Becker (second round)
7. (Croatia) Ivo Karlović (quarterfinals)
8. (Kazakhstan) Evgeny Korolev (first round)

== Draw ==
Key

- Q = Qualifier
- WC = Wild card
- LL = Lucky loser
- Alt = Alternate
- ITF = ITF entry
- PR = Protected ranking
- SR = Special ranking
- SE = Special exempt
- JE = Junior exempt
- JR = Junior Accelerator Programme entrant
- CO = College Accelerator Programme entrant
- NG = Next Gen Accelerator Program entrant
- w/o = Walkover
- r = Retired
- d = Defaulted

=== Finals ===
Semifinals
1	(Croatia) Marin Čilić	7^{7}	6
3	(Austria) Jürgen Melzer	6^{5}	4
(Germany) Michael Berrer	7^{8}	7
(Germany) Philipp Petzschner	6^{6}	5

Final
1	(Croatia) Marin Čilić	6	6^{5}	6
(Germany) Michael Berrer	4	7^{7}	3

=== Top half ===
First round
1	(Croatia) M Čilić	6	6
(Czech Republic) J Hájek	2	2
(Austria) D Köllerer	6	3	6
(Kazakhstan) A Golubev	3	6	3
Q	(France) A Sidorenko	7^{7}	3	6
Q	(Belgium) R Bemelmans	6^{5}	6	3
WC	(Croatia) A Veić	5^{r}
7	(Croatia) I Karlović	4
3	(Austria) J Melzer	6	6
(Germany) D Brands	4	3
(Russia) I Kunitsyn	6	2	5
(Belgium) O Rochus	4	6	7
(Italy) S Bolelli	2	4
(Ukraine) I Marchenko	6	6
WC	(Croatia) I Dodig	7^{11}	6
8	(Kazakhstan) E Korolev	6^{9}	4

Second round
1	(Croatia) M Čilić	6	6
(Austria) D Köllerer	2	1
Q	(France) A Sidorenko	6^{4}	6^{8}
7	(Croatia) I Karlović	7^{7}	7^{10}
3	(Austria) J Melzer	6	6
(Belgium) O Rochus	2	3
(Ukraine) I Marchenko	6	6
WC	(Croatia) I Dodig	4	2

Quarterfinals
1	(Croatia) M Čilić	7^{8}	6
7	(Croatia) I Karlović	6^{6}	4
3	(Austria) J Melzer	3	6	7
(Ukraine) I Marchenko	6	0	5

Semifinals
1	(Croatia) M Čilić	7^{7}	6
3	(Austria) J Melzer	6^{5}	4

=== Bottom half ===
First round
5	(Serbia) J Tipsarević	6^{5}	3
(Germany) M Berrer	7^{7}	6
WC	(Croatia) P Jelenić	7^{8}	7
Q	(Serbia) I Bozoljac	6^{6}	5
(Kazakhstan) M Kukushkin	6	6
(Germany) M Zverev	4	3
(Germany) R Schüttler	3	2
4	(Serbia) V Troicki	6	6
6	(Germany) B Becker	1	6	7^{7}
Q	(Sweden) A Vinciguerra	6	1	6^{4}
(Belgium) C Rochus	7^{7}	3	1
(Germany) P Petzschner	6^{4}	6	6
(Uzbekistan) D Istomin	2	2^{r}
(Slovakia) L Lacko	6	2
(France) A Clément	6^{4}	3
2	(Croatia) I Ljubičić	7^{7}	6

Second round
(Germany) M Berrer	6	6
WC	(Croatia) P Jelenić	4	3
(Kazakhstan) M Kukushkin	5	5
4	(Serbia) V Troicki	7	7
6	(Germany) B Becker	6	6^{4}	6^{6}
(Germany) P Petzschner	1	7^{7}	7^{8}
(Slovakia) L Lacko	7^{7}	5	7^{7}
2	(Croatia) I Ljubičić	6^{3}	7	6^{5}

Quarterfinals
(Germany) M Berrer	6	6
4	(Serbia) V Troicki	4	3
(Germany) P Petzschner	6^{1}	6	6
(Slovakia) L Lacko	7^{7}	2	2

Semifinals
(Germany) M Berrer	7^{8}	7
(Germany) P Petzschner	6^{6}	5

== Qualifying ==
=== Seeds ===
1. (Switzerland) Stéphane Bohli (first round)
2. (Turkey) Marsel İlhan (second round)
3. (Switzerland) Michael Lammer (qualifying competition)
4. (Serbia) Ilija Bozoljac (qualified)
5. (France) Alexandre Sidorenko (qualified)
6. (Belgium) Ruben Bemelmans (qualified)
7. (Austria) Martin Fischer (qualifying competition)
8. (Netherlands) Raemon Sluiter (first round)

=== Qualifiers ===
1. (Sweden) Andreas Vinciguerra
2. (Belgium) Ruben Bemelmans
3. (France) Alexandre Sidorenko
4. (Serbia) Ilija Bozoljac

== Qualifying draw ==
=== First qualifier ===
First round
1	(Switzerland) Stéphane Bohli	6^{4}	5
(Sweden) Andreas Vinciguerra	7^{7}	7
(Slovakia) Ivo Klec	6	1
WC	(Croatia) Toni Androić	4	0^{r}
(Germany) Cedrik-Marcel Stebe	6	6
(Croatia) Kristijan Mesaroš	2	1
(Belgium) Yannick Mertens	6	6
8	(Netherlands) Raemon Sluiter	3	4

Second round
(Sweden) Andreas Vinciguerra	6	6
(Slovakia) Ivo Klec	1	2
(Germany) Cedrik-Marcel Stebe	6	4	3
(Belgium) Yannick Mertens	4	6	6

Qualifying competition
(Sweden) Andreas Vinciguerra	6	3	7^{7}
(Belgium) Yannick Mertens	4	6	6^{4}

=== Second qualifier ===
First round
2	(Turkey) Marsel İlhan	6^{4}	7^{7}	6
(Austria) Alexander Peya	7^{7}	6^{4}	2
(United Kingdom) James Ward	6	3	6
WC	(Croatia) Antonio Lupieri	4	6	3
(Poland) Jerzy Janowicz	6	6
(United Kingdom) Colin Fleming	4	2
(Germany) Simon Stadler	6	5	0
6	(Belgium) Ruben Bemelmans	3	7	6

Second round
2	(Turkey) Marsel İlhan	7^{7}	4	6^{5}
(United Kingdom) James Ward	6^{4}	6	7^{7}
(Poland) Jerzy Janowicz	3	4
6	(Belgium) Ruben Bemelmans	6	6

Qualifying competition
(United Kingdom) James Ward	6^{3}	6^{4}
6	(Belgium) Ruben Bemelmans	7^{7}	7^{7}

=== Third qualifier ===
First round
3	(Switzerland) Michael Lammer	6	6
(Czech Republic) Jan Minář	4	3
(Serbia) Dušan Lajović	1	5
(Croatia) Ante Pavić	6	7
(Netherlands) Robin Haase	6	7^{9}
WC	(Croatia) Joško Topić	4	6^{7}
(Sweden) Björn Rehnquist	3	6	1
5	(France) Alexandre Sidorenko	6	1	6

Second round
3	(Switzerland) Michael Lammer	6	6
(Croatia) Ante Pavić	2	1
(Netherlands) Robin Haase	4	4
5	(France) Alexandre Sidorenko	6	6

Qualifying competition
3	(Switzerland) Michael Lammer	6^{2}	3
5	(France) Alexandre Sidorenko	7^{7}	6

=== Fourth qualifier ===
First round
4	(Serbia) Ilija Bozoljac	6	6
(Croatia) Franko Škugor	4	3
(Italy) Andrea Arnaboldi	6	3	3
(Austria) Philipp Oswald	2	6	6
(Japan) Takao Suzuki	7^{8}	6
(Croatia) Antonio Šančić	6^{6}	2
WC	(Croatia) Ivan Turudic	3	2
7	(Austria) Martin Fischer	6	6

Second round
4	(Serbia) Ilija Bozoljac	6	7
(Austria) Philipp Oswald	1	5
(Japan) Takao Suzuki	2	7^{12}	2
7	(Austria) Martin Fischer	6	6^{10}	6

Qualifying competition
4	(Serbia) Ilija Bozoljac	6	7^{7}
7	(Austria) Martin Fischer	4	6^{1}
