= 2005 US Open – Boys' doubles =

Boys' doubles
- 2005 US Open

Final
- Champion: (United States) Alex Clayton (United States) Donald Young
- Runner-up: (Australia) Carsten Ball (Netherlands) Thiemo de Bakker
- Score: 7–6^{(7–3)}, 4–6, 7–5

Events
Singles	men	women		boys	girls
Doubles	men	women	mixed	boys	girls
WC Singles	men	women	quad
WC Doubles	men	women	quad
Legends	men	women	mixed
- US Open

Brendan Evans and Scott Oudsema were the defending champions, but did not compete in the Juniors in this year.

Alex Clayton and Donald Young won in the final 7–6^{(7–3)}, 4–6, 7–5, against Carsten Ball and Thiemo de Bakker.

== Seeds ==
1. (Argentina) Leonardo Mayer / (Brazil) André Miele (second round)
2. (Australia) Carsten Ball / (Netherlands) Thiemo de Bakker (final)
3. (Croatia) Petar Jelenić / (Russia) Evgeny Kirillov (semifinals)
4. (South Korea) Kim Sun-yong / (Czech Republic) Dušan Lojda (first round)
5. (United States) Timothy Neilly / (The Bahamas) Ryan Sweeting (quarterfinals)
6. (Italy) Andrea Arnaboldi / (Belgium) Niels Desein (first round)
7. (Venezuela) Piero Luisi / (Venezuela) David Navarrete (second round)
8. (United States) Alex Clayton / (United States) Donald Young (champions)

== Draw ==
Key

- Q = Qualifier
- WC = Wild card
- LL = Lucky loser
- Alt = Alternate
- ITF = ITF entry
- PR = Protected ranking
- SR = Special ranking
- SE = Special exempt
- JE = Junior exempt
- JR = Junior Accelerator Programme entrant
- CO = College Accelerator Programme entrant
- NG = Next Gen Accelerator Program entrant
- w/o = Walkover
- r = Retired
- d = Defaulted

=== Finals ===
Semifinals
8	(United States) Alex Clayton (United States) Donald Young	6	6
3	(Croatia) Petar Jelenić (Russia) Evgeny Kirillov	2	3
(United States) Jesse Levine (United States) Michael Shabaz	1	3
2	(Australia) Carsten Ball (Netherlands) Thiemo de Bakker	6	6

Final
8	(United States) Alex Clayton (United States) Donald Young	7^{7}	4	7
2	(Australia) Carsten Ball (Netherlands) Thiemo de Bakker	6^{3}	6	5

=== Top half ===
First round
(United States) Kellen Damico (United States) Tim Smyczek	6	6
(India) Rupesh Roy (Austria) David Simon	3	0
(Panama) Alberto Gonzalez (Japan) Kei Nishikori	6^{6}	4
(United Kingdom) Andrew Kennaugh (Germany) Jochen Schoettler	7^{8}	6
(Croatia) Luka Belić (Croatia) Antonio Veić	4	2
8	(United States) Alex Clayton (United States) Donald Young	6	6
3	(Croatia) Petar Jelenić (Russia) Evgeny Kirillov	6	7^{7}
(France) Kevin Botti (France) Jérémy Chardy	3	6^{3}
(United States) Matt Bruch (United States) Holden Seguso	6	6
(Japan) Sho Aida (Japan) Kento Takeuchi	1	4
(United States) Tyler Hochwalt (United States) Dennis Nevolo	6	1	1
(Australia) Stephen Donald (Spain) Javier Garrapiz-Borderías	4	6	6
(United States) Waylon Chin (United States) Johnny Hamui	2	0
5	(United States) Timothy Neilly (The Bahamas) Ryan Sweeting	6	6

Second round
1	(Argentina) L Mayer (Brazil) A Miele	3	4
(United States) K Damico (United States) T Smyczek	6	6
(United Kingdom) A Kennaugh (Germany) J Schoettler	6^{2}	7	4
8	(United States) A Clayton (United States) D Young	7^{7}	5	6
3	(Croatia) P Jelenić (Russia) E Kirillov	2	6	6
(United States) M Bruch (United States) H Seguso	6	4	4
(Australia) S Donald (Spain) J Garrapiz-Borderías	2	6	2
5	(United States) T Neilly (The Bahamas) R Sweeting	6	4	6

Quarterfinals
(United States) K Damico (United States) T Smyczek	1	6^{5}
8	(United States) A Clayton (United States) D Young	6	7^{7}
3	(Croatia) P Jelenić (Russia) E Kirillov	6	1	7^{7}
5	(United States) T Neilly (The Bahamas) R Sweeting	4	6	6^{2}

Semifinals
8	(United States) A Clayton (United States) D Young	6	6
3	(Croatia) P Jelenić (Russia) E Kirillov	2	3

=== Bottom half ===
First round
6	(Italy) Andrea Arnaboldi (Belgium) Niels Desein	3	4
(Slovakia) Pavol Červenák (Slovakia) Lukáš Lacko	6	6
(United States) Michael Mcclune (United States) Sam Querrey	6	7^{8}
(India) Jeevan Nedunchezhiyan (India) Vivek Shokeen	2	6^{6}
(United States) Jesse Levine (United States) Michael Shabaz	6	6
(Russia) Pavel Chekhov (Russia) Valery Rudnev	3	3
(Canada) Philip Bester (Canada) Peter Polansky	7	6
4	(South Korea) Kim Sun-yong (Czech Republic) Dušan Lojda	5	4
7	(Venezuela) Piero Luisi (Venezuela) David Navarrete	6	6
(Estonia) Jaak Põldma (United States) Wil Spencer	1	2
(Croatia) Nikola Mektić (Ukraine) Ivan Sergeyev	6	7^{8}
(Australia) James Lemke (Mexico) Miguel Ángel Reyes-Varela	4	6^{6}
(United States) Dylan Arnould (United States) Jamie Hunt	3	3
(Croatia) Marin Čilić (Republic of Ireland) Tristan Farron-Mahon	6	6
(United States) Dennis Lajola (United States) Nathaniel Schnugg	3	3
2	(Australia) Carsten Ball (Netherlands) Thiemo de Bakker	6	6

Second round
(Slovakia) P Červenák (Slovakia) L Lacko	6	7
(United States) M Mcclune (United States) S Querrey	2	5
(United States) J Levine (United States) M Shabaz	7	6
(Canada) P Bester (Canada) P Polansky	5	2
7	(Venezuela) P Luisi (Venezuela) D Navarrete	6	6^{2}	4
(Croatia) N Mektić (Ukraine) I Sergeyev	3	7^{7}	6
(Croatia) M Čilić (Republic of Ireland) T Farron-Mahon	5	6	3
2	(Australia) C Ball (Netherlands) T de Bakker	7	4	6

Quarterfinals
(Slovakia) P Červenák (Slovakia) L Lacko	2	6^{2}
(United States) J Levine (United States) M Shabaz	6	7^{7}
(Croatia) N Mektić (Ukraine) I Sergeyev	6	6^{3}	6^{5}
2	(Australia) C Ball (Netherlands) T de Bakker	2	7^{7}	7^{7}

Semifinals
(United States) J Levine (United States) M Shabaz	1	3
2	(Australia) C Ball (Netherlands) T de Bakker	6	6
