= Beth Arnoult =

American wheelchair tennis player

- Full name: Beth Ann Arnoult-Ritthaler
- Country (sports): United States
- Born: 1 December 1965 (age 59) Paia, Maui, Hawaii, United States
- Turned pro: 1998
- Retired: 2008
- Plays: Right-handed (one-handed backhand)

Singles
- Highest ranking: No. 10 (13 February 2006)

Grand Slam singles results
- US Open: QF (2006, 2007)

Other tournaments
- Paralympic Games: QF (2008)

Doubles
- Highest ranking: No. 10 (3 July 2006)

Grand Slam doubles results
- US Open: F (2005)

Other doubles tournaments
- Paralympic Games: F (2008)
Medal record
Parapan American Games
Gold medal – first place	2007 Rio de Janeiro	Women's doubles
Silver medal – second place	2007 Rio de Janeiro	Women's singles

Beth Ann Arnoult-Ritthaler (born December 1, 1965) is a retired American wheelchair tennis player who competed in international level events. She was a silver medalist at the 2007 Parapan American Games. She was a quarterfinalist in the women's singles in the 2008 Summer Paralympics and was fourth place in the women's doubles with Kaitlyn Verfuerth.

Arnoult was paralysed from a car accident with an all-terrain vehicle in 1991 when her vertebrae were shattered leaving her paralysed.
