= Jelenić =

Jelenić (Serbian Cyrillic: Јеленић, pronounced [jělenitɕ]) is a Serbo-Croatian surname. It is spelled Jelenič in Slovenia. Notable people with the surname include:

- Enej Jelenič (born 1992), Slovenian footballer
- Michael Jelenic, American animator, storyboard artist and director
- Petar Jelenić (born 1987), retired Croatian tennis player
- Viktor Jelenić (born 1970), retired Serbian water polo player
