= 2005 US Open – Women's singles =

Women's singles
- 2005 US Open

Final
- Champion: (Belgium) Kim Clijsters
- Runner-up: (France) Mary Pierce
- Score: 6–3, 6–1

Details
- Draw: 128
- Seeds: 32

Events
Singles	men	women		boys	girls
Doubles	men	women	mixed	boys	girls
WC Singles	men	women	quad
WC Doubles	men	women	quad
Legends	men	women	mixed
← 2004 ·	US Open	· 2006 →

Kim Clijsters defeated Mary Pierce in the final, 6–3, 6–1 to win the women's singles tennis title at the 2005 US Open. It was her first major singles title, following four runner-up finishes in major finals.

Svetlana Kuznetsova was the defending champion, but was defeated by Ekaterina Bychkova in the first round. Kuznetsova was the first US Open champion to lose in the first round of their title defense.

This marked the final major appearance of former world No. 2 and 1994 Wimbledon champion Conchita Martínez.

== Seeds ==
1. (Russia) Maria Sharapova (semifinals)
2. (United States) Lindsay Davenport (quarterfinals)
3. (France) Amélie Mauresmo (quarterfinals)
4. (Belgium) Kim Clijsters (champion)
5. (Russia) Svetlana Kuznetsova (first round)
6. (Russia) Elena Dementieva (semifinals)
7. (Belgium) Justine Henin (fourth round)
8. (United States) Serena Williams (fourth round)
9. (Russia) Nadia Petrova (quarterfinals)
10. (United States) Venus Williams (quarterfinals)
11. (Switzerland) Patty Schnyder (fourth round)
12. (France) Mary Pierce (final)
13. (Russia) Anastasia Myskina (third round)
14. (Australia) Alicia Molik (first round)
15. (France) Nathalie Dechy (fourth round)
16. (Russia) Elena Bovina (withdrew)
17. (Serbia and Montenegro) Jelena Janković (third round, retired)
18. (Serbia and Montenegro) Ana Ivanovic (second round)
19. (Russia) Elena Likhovtseva (fourth round)
20. (Slovakia) Daniela Hantuchová (third round)
21. (Russia) Dinara Safina (first round)
22. (Italy) Silvia Farina Elia (first round)
23. (France) Tatiana Golovin (third round)
24. (Japan) Shinobu Asagoe (third round)
25. (Italy) Francesca Schiavone (third round)
26. (Czech Republic) Nicole Vaidišová (fourth round)
27. (Argentina) Gisela Dulko (second round)
28. (Italy) Flavia Pennetta (first round)
29. (Russia) Anna Chakvetadze (third round)
30. (Japan) Ai Sugiyama (third round)
31. (Germany) Anna-Lena Grönefeld (third round)
32. (Spain) Anabel Medina Garrigues (third round)
33. (Russia) Vera Dushevina (second round)

== Draw ==
=== Key ===
- Q = Qualifier
- WC = Wild card
- LL = Lucky loser
- Alt = Alternate
- ITF = ITF entry
- PR = Protected ranking
- SR = Special ranking
- SE = Special exempt
- JE = Junior exempt
- JR = Junior Accelerator Programme entrant
- CO = College Accelerator Programme entrant
- NG = Next Gen Accelerator Program entrant
- w/o = Walkover
- r = Retired
- d = Defaulted

=== Finals ===
Quarterfinals
1	(Russia) Maria Sharapova	7	4	6
9	(Russia) Nadia Petrova	5	6	4
4	(Belgium) Kim Clijsters	4	7	6
10	(United States) Venus Williams	6	5	1
12	(France) Mary Pierce	6	6
3	(France) Amélie Mauresmo	4	1
6	(Russia) Elena Dementieva	6	3	7^{8}
2	(United States) Lindsay Davenport	1	6	6^{6}

Semifinals
1	(Russia) Maria Sharapova	2	7^{7}	3
4	(Belgium) Kim Clijsters	6	6^{4}	6
12	(France) Mary Pierce	3	6	6
6	(Russia) Elena Dementieva	6	2	2

Finals
4	(Belgium) Kim Clijsters	6	6
12	(France) Mary Pierce	3	1

=== Top half ===
==== Section 1 ====
First round
1	(Russia) M Sharapova	6	6
(Greece) E Daniilidou	1	1
(Madagascar) D Randriantefy	6	6
WC	(United States) M Gambale	3	1
Q	(Luxembourg) A Kremer	4	6	2
(United States) L Raymond	6	3	6
(Germany) J Schruff	6	3	7
28	(Italy) F Pennetta	4	6	5
21	(Russia) D Safina	3	7	3
(Italy) ME Camerin	6	6^{5}	6
(United States) M Washington	6^{6}	7	4
(India) S Mirza	7	6^{6}	6
(Czech Republic) B Strýcová	3	0
(France) M Bartoli	6	6
WC	(United States) S Perry	6	6
14	(Australia) A Molik	4	4

Second round
1	(Russia) M Sharapova	6	6
(Madagascar) D Randriantefy	1	0
(United States) L Raymond	2	3
(Germany) J Schruff	6	6
(Italy) ME Camerin	4	6	4
(India) S Mirza	6	1	6
(France) M Bartoli	4	6	6
WC	(United States) S Perry	6	1	0

Third round
1	(Russia) M Sharapova	6	6
(Germany) J Schruff	2	4
(India) S Mirza	7	6
(France) M Bartoli	6^{4}	4

Fourth round
1	(Russia) M Sharapova	6	6
(India) S Mirza	2	1

==== Section 2 ====
First round
9	(Russia) N Petrova	6	6
(Czech Republic) E Birnerová	4	4
(United States) M Irvin	3	3
(Japan) A Nakamura	6	6
(Australia) N Pratt	6^{0}	6
(Japan) A Morigami	7	0	r
(United States) L Granville	6	6
22	(Italy) S Farina Elia	2	1
26	(Czech Republic) N Vaidišová	6	6
(Czech Republic) K Peschke	3	1
(China) J Zheng	6	3	6
(Czech Republic) I Benešová	2	6	0
Q	(Croatia) I Lisjak	1	6	6
(France) É Loit	6	4	3
(Russia) E Bychkova	6	6
5	(Russia) S Kuznetsova	3	2

Second round
9	(Russia) N Petrova	6	6
(Japan) A Nakamura	2	0
(Australia) N Pratt	4	7	5
(United States) L Granville	6	5	7
26	(Czech Republic) N Vaidišová	6	6
(China) J Zheng	3	0
Q	(Croatia) I Lisjak	7	6
(Russia) E Bychkova	5	1

Third round
9	(Russia) N Petrova	6	7
(United States) L Granville	2	5
26	(Czech Republic) N Vaidišová	6	7
Q	(Croatia) I Lisjak	1	6^{2}

Fourth round
9	(Russia) N Petrova	7	7
26	(Czech Republic) N Vaidišová	6^{4}	5

==== Section 3 ====
First round
4	(Belgium) K Clijsters	6	6
Q	(Germany) M Müller	1	2
WC	(United States) A Harkleroad	0	0	r
(Colombia) F Zuluaga	6	3
(Czech Republic) M Paštiková	3	7^{7}	6
PR	(Italy) R Grande	6	6^{5}	3
(Ukraine) A Bondarenko	7	4	3
30	(Japan) A Sugiyama	5	6	6
18	(Serbia and Montenegro) A Ivanovic	7	6
(United States) L Lee-Waters	6^{5}	3
(Croatia) S Mamić	6	3	3
(Venezuela) M Vento-Kabchi	1	6	6
(Poland) M Domachowska	5	5
(Israel) S Pe'er	7	7
Q	(United States) T Dabek	1	2
33	(Russia) V Dushevina	6	6

Second round
4	(Belgium) K Clijsters	7	6
(Colombia) F Zuluaga	5	0
(Czech Republic) M Paštiková	6	4	4
30	(Japan) A Sugiyama	2	6	6
18	(Serbia and Montenegro) A Ivanovic	6	5	1
(Venezuela) M Vento-Kabchi	3	7	6
(Israel) S Pe'er	7	3	6
33	(Russia) V Dushevina	5	6	3

Third round
4	(Belgium) K Clijsters	6	6
30	(Japan) A Sugiyama	1	4
(Venezuela) M Vento-Kabchi	7	4	6
(Israel) S Pe'er	5	6	3

Fourth round
4	(Belgium) K Clijsters	6	6
(Venezuela) M Vento-Kabchi	1	0

==== Section 4 ====
First round
10	(United States) V Williams	6	6
(Japan) R Fujiwara	3	1
(Spain) L Pous Tió	2	3
(Russia) M Kirilenko	6	6
Q	(Argentina) ME Salerni	6	3	7
WC	(United States) J Kirkland	4	6	6^{0}
(France) C Pin	3	1
20	(Slovakia) D Hantuchová	6	6
25	(Italy) F Schiavone	6	7
(Croatia) J Kostanić	2	5
(China) S Peng	6	6^{4}	2
Q	(Finland) E Laine	3	7	6
(Russia) A Jidkova	4	3
(Colombia) C Castaño	6	6
Q	(Chinese Taipei) Y-j Chan	1	3
8	(United States) S Williams	6	6

Second round
10	(United States) V Williams	6	6
(Russia) M Kirilenko	1	3
Q	(Argentina) ME Salerni	1	0
20	(Slovakia) D Hantuchová	6	6
25	(Italy) F Schiavone	6	6
Q	(Finland) E Laine	2	2
(Colombia) C Castaño	2	2
8	(United States) S Williams	6	6

Third round
10	(United States) V Williams	6	6
20	(Slovakia) D Hantuchová	3	3
25	(Italy) F Schiavone	3	4
8	(United States) S Williams	6	6

Fourth round
10	(United States) V Williams	7	6
8	(United States) S Williams	6^{5}	2

=== Bottom half ===
==== Section 5 ====
First round
7	(Belgium) J Henin-Hardenne	6	6
(Czech Republic) Z Ondrášková	3	0
LL	(Spain) M Sánchez Lorenzo	7	7
WC	(United States) A Haynes	5	6^{6}
(South Korea) Y-j Cho	6	2	6
(Spain) A Parra Santonja	4	6	4
Q	(France) S Foretz	3	2
27	(Argentina) G Dulko	6	6
17	(Serbia and Montenegro) J Janković	7	6
(Czech Republic) D Chládková	5	3
(Ukraine) Y Fedak	4	3
WC	(United States) A Glatch	6	6
(Slovenia) K Srebotnik	6	6
Q	(Chinese Taipei) S-w Hsieh	0	2
(Italy) M Santangelo	2	4
12	(France) M Pierce	6	6

Second round
7	(Belgium) J Henin-Hardenne	6	6
LL	(Spain) M Sánchez Lorenzo	3	4
(South Korea) Y-j Cho	6	6
27	(Argentina) G Dulko	4	3
17	(Serbia and Montenegro) J Janković	6	6
WC	(United States) A Glatch	2	0
(Slovenia) K Srebotnik	3	2
12	(France) M Pierce	6	6

Third round
7	(Belgium) J Henin-Hardenne	6	7
(South Korea) Y-j Cho	0	6^{4}
17	(Serbia and Montenegro) J Janković	3	0	r
12	(France) M Pierce	6	3

Fourth round
7	(Belgium) J Henin-Hardenne	3	4
12	(France) M Pierce	6	6

==== Section 6 ====
First round
13	(Russia) A Myskina	6	6
(Thailand) T Tanasugarn	3	1
(United States) A Frazier	6	7
WC	(United States) C Gullickson	4	5
LL	(Switzerland) E Gagliardi	1	3
(Bulgaria) M Maleeva	6	6
(Italy) T Garbin	4	1
19	(Russia) E Likhovtseva	6	6
31	(Germany) A-L Grönefeld	6	6
(Puerto Rico) K Brandi	2	3
(France) V Razzano	7	6
(United States) A Spears	6^{6}	3
(Bulgaria) S Karatantcheva	2	7	7
(United States) M Shaughnessy	6	5	5
(Italy) R Vinci	3	2
3	(France) A Mauresmo	6	6

Second round
13	(Russia) A Myskina	6	6
(United States) A Frazier	3	2
(Bulgaria) M Maleeva	2	1
19	(Russia) E Likhovtseva	6	6
31	(Germany) A-L Grönefeld	3	6	6
(France) V Razzano	6	3	4
(Bulgaria) S Karatantcheva	0	1
3	(France) A Mauresmo	6	6

Third round
13	(Russia) A Myskina	6	3	6^{6}
19	(Russia) E Likhovtseva	0	6	7
31	(Germany) A-L Grönefeld	5	3
3	(France) A Mauresmo	7	6

Fourth round
19	(Russia) E Likhovtseva	1	4
3	(France) A Mauresmo	6	6

==== Section 7 ====
First round
6	(Russia) E Dementieva	7	6
(Czech Republic) L Šafářová	5	3
(Argentina) M Díaz Oliva	6	6
WC	(United States) B Mattek	4	3
(United States) J Craybas	6	2	7
(United States) J Jackson	4	6	5
Q	(Ukraine) V Kutuzova	3	6	5
29	(Russia) A Chakvetadze	6	3	7
24	(Japan) S Asagoe	6	6
(France) S Cohen-Aloro	1	4
(Spain) N Llagostera Vives	6	4	4
(Russia) E Linetskaia	3	6	6
(Slovakia) M Suchá	4	6	7
Q	(Austria) S Bammer	6	4	5
(Spain) C Martínez	6	4	2
11	(Switzerland) P Schnyder	4	6	6

Second round
6	(Russia) E Dementieva	7	6
(Argentina) M Díaz Oliva	5	1
(United States) J Craybas	0	2
29	(Russia) A Chakvetadze	6	6
24	(Japan) S Asagoe	6	6
(Russia) E Linetskaia	4	4
(Slovakia) M Suchá	3	6	2
11	(Switzerland) P Schnyder	6	2	6

Third round
6	(Russia) E Dementieva	6	4	7
29	(Russia) A Chakvetadze	1	6	6^{5}
24	(Japan) S Asagoe	1	3
11	(Switzerland) P Schnyder	6	6

Fourth round
6	(Russia) E Dementieva	6	6
11	(Switzerland) P Schnyder	4	3

==== Section 8 ====
First round
15	(France) N Dechy	6	7
(France) S Beltrame	4	5
(Czech Republic) K Koukalová	3	6	1
Q	(United States) V King	6	3	6
(Israel) A Smashnova	6	6
Q	(Germany) S Klösel	3	3
Q	(Spain) V Ruano Pascual	3	6	6^{5}
23	(France) T Golovin	6	2	7
32	(Spain) A Medina Garrigues	6	6
(Croatia) K Šprem	2	3
Q	(China) T Sun	6	7
(Australia) S Stosur	3	6^{4}
(Italy) A Serra Zanetti	6	3	4
Q	(France) P Parmentier	2	6	6
(China) N Li	4	4
2	(United States) L Davenport	6	6

Second round
15	(France) N Dechy	6	6
Q	(United States) V King	1	1
(Israel) A Smashnova	4	6^{6}
23	(France) T Golovin	6	7
32	(Spain) A Medina Garrigues	6	7
Q	(China) T Sun	4	5
Q	(France) P Parmentier	1	1
2	(United States) L Davenport	6	6

Third round
15	(France) N Dechy	7	2	6
23	(France) T Golovin	5	6	2
32	(Spain) A Medina Garrigues	3	2
2	(United States) L Davenport	6	6

Fourth round
15	(France) N Dechy	0	3
2	(United States) L Davenport	6	6

== Championship match statistics ==
Category	(Belgium) Clijsters	(France) Pierce
1st serve %	33/47 (70%)	33/49 (67%)
1st serve points won	27 of 33 = 82%	17 of 33 = 52%
2nd serve points won	5 of 14 = 36%	6 of 16 = 38%
Total service points won	32 of 47 = 68.09%	23 of 49 = 46.94%
Aces	5	1
Double faults	2	1
Winners	10	6
Unforced errors	10	19
Net points won	4 of 4 = 100%	9 of 15 = 60%
Break points converted	5 of 11 = 45%	1 of 4 = 25%
Return points won	26 of 49 = 53%	15 of 47 = 32%
Total points won	58	38

Preceded by 2005 Wimbledon Championships – Women's singles	Grand Slam women's singles	Succeeded by 2006 Australian Open – Women's singles
