= 2010 PBZ Zagreb Indoors – Doubles =

Doubles
- 2010 PBZ Zagreb Indoors

Final
- Champions: (Austria) Jürgen Melzer (Germany) Philipp Petzschner
- Runners-up: (France) Arnaud Clément (Belgium) Olivier Rochus
- Score: 3–6, 6–3, [10–8]

Events
Singles	Doubles
← 2009 ·	PBZ Zagreb Indoors	· 2011 →

Martin Damm and Robert Lindstedt were the defending champions. Both are present, but chose not compete together this year.
Damm partnered up with Filip Polášek, but they lost in the semifinals 6–7^{(4–7)}, 4–6, against Jürgen Melzer and Philipp Petzschner.
Lindstedt partnered up with Julian Knowle, but they lost 3–6, 6–7^{(6–8)}, against Christopher Kas and Evgeny Korolev in the first round.
Jürgen Melzer and Philipp Petzschner won this tournament, after won in the final 3–6, 6–3, [10–8], against Arnaud Clément and Olivier Rochus.

== Seeds ==
1. (Czech Republic) František Čermák / (Slovakia) Michal Mertiňák (quarterfinals)
2. (Austria) Julian Knowle / (Sweden) Robert Lindstedt (first round)
3. (Czech Republic) Martin Damm / (Slovakia) Filip Polášek (semifinals)
4. (United Kingdom) Ross Hutchins / (Australia) Jordan Kerr (quarterfinals)

== Draw ==
=== Key ===
- Q = Qualifier
- WC = Wild card
- LL = Lucky loser
- Alt = Alternate
- SE = Special exempt
- PR = Protected ranking
- ITF = ITF entry
- JE = Junior exempt
- w/o = Walkover
- r = Retired
- d = Defaulted
- SR = Special ranking

=== Draw ===
First round
1	(Czech Republic) F Čermák (Slovakia) M Mertiňák	6	6
(United Kingdom) C Fleming (United Kingdom) K Skupski	4	3
(Uzbekistan) D Istomin (Italy) A Motti	4	7^{7}	[7]
(Austria) J Melzer (Germany) P Petzschner	6	6^{4}	[10]
3	(Czech Republic) M Damm (Slovakia) F Polášek	6^{4}	6	[10]
(Czech Republic) J Levinský (Germany) M Zverev	7^{7}	3	[8]
(Germany) M Kohlmann (Austria) A Peya	2	7^{7}	[10]
(United Kingdom) J Marray (United Kingdom) J Murray	6	6^{1}	[7]
(United Kingdom) J Delgado (Germany) F Moser	6	5	[8]
(France) A Clément (Belgium) O Rochus	4	7	[10]
WC	(Croatia) F Škugor (Croatia) I Zovko	6^{4}	6^{5}
4	(United Kingdom) R Hutchins (Australia) J Kerr	7^{7}	7^{7}
(Germany) B Becker (Germany) R Schüttler	7^{9}	2	[10]
WC	(Croatia) M Draganja (Croatia) L Zovko	6^{7}	6	[4]
(Germany) C Kas (Kazakhstan) E Korolev	6	7^{8}
2	(Austria) J Knowle (Sweden) R Lindstedt	3	6^{6}

Quarterfinals
1	(Czech Republic) F Čermák (Slovakia) M Mertiňák	4	4
(Austria) J Melzer (Germany) P Petzschner	6	6
3	(Czech Republic) M Damm (Slovakia) F Polášek	6	6
(Germany) M Kohlmann (Austria) A Peya	4	2
(France) A Clément (Belgium) O Rochus	6	6
4	(United Kingdom) R Hutchins (Australia) J Kerr	3	1
(Germany) B Becker (Germany) R Schüttler	6	6
(Germany) C Kas (Kazakhstan) E Korolev	4	0

Semifinals
(Austria) J Melzer (Germany) P Petzschner	7^{7}	6
3	(Czech Republic) M Damm (Slovakia) F Polášek	6^{4}	4
(France) A Clément (Belgium) O Rochus	6	1	[10]
(Germany) B Becker (Germany) R Schüttler	3	6	[3]

Final
(Austria) J Melzer (Germany) P Petzschner	3	6	[10]
(France) A Clément (Belgium) O Rochus	6	3	[8]
