= Emmy Kaiser =

American wheelchair tennis player

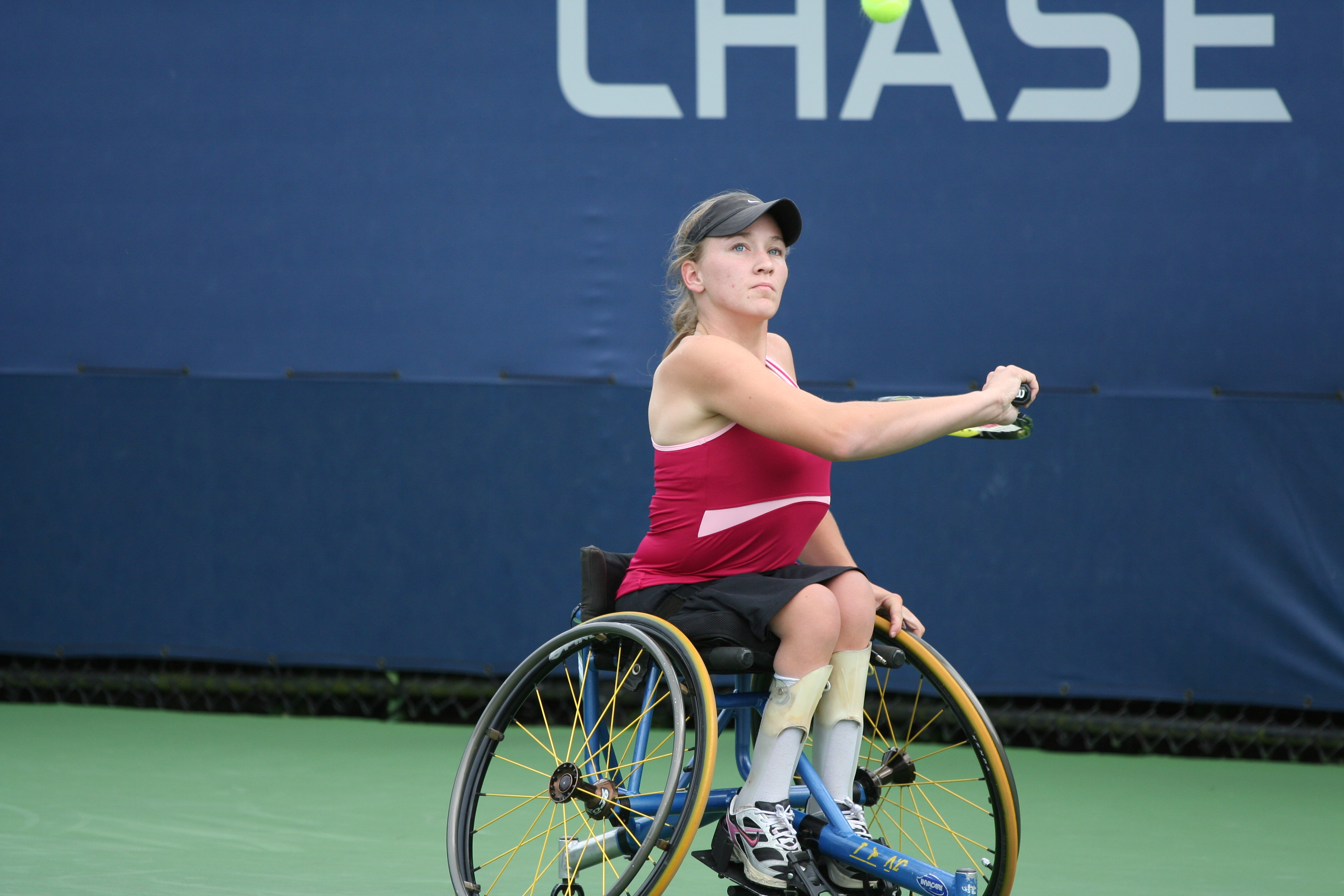
- Kaiser at the 2009 US Open
- Country (sports): United States
- Born: May 16, 1990 (age 35); Cincinnati, Ohio
- Height: 5 ft 0 in (1.52 m)
Medal record
Women's wheelchair tennis
Representing United States
Parapan American Games
Gold medal – first place	2011 Guadalajara	Women's doubles
Silver medal – second place	2011 Guadalajara	Women's singles
Bronze medal – third place	2015 Toronto	Women's singles
Bronze medal – third place	2015 Toronto	Women's doubles

Emmy Kaiser (born May 16, 1990) is an American wheelchair tennis player.

== Biography ==
Kaiser was born in Cincinnati, Ohio. A graduate of St. Henry District High School, she is a 2011 Parapan American Games gold medalist for doubles wheelchair tennis and silver medalist for singles. She resides at Fort Mitchell, Kentucky and is living with spina bifida. She has a bachelor's degree in psychology and attended Ball State University in Muncie, Indiana for a degree in exercise and sport psychology in which she got enrolled right after the 2012 Summer Paralympics. Her passion for such career persuasion started at the age of 14 when she met sports psychologist during a training session at the U.S. Paralympic Junior National team. Her tennis passion was inspired after she saw a tennis player named Esther Vergeer. In 2012, she was defeated by Lucy Shuker of Great Britain with 6–0, 6–2 loss in London Paralympic Games. In 2014, she lost to Jordanne Whiley with the score being 6–2 twice.

In 2016 Kaiser was named Player of the Year by the International Tennis Federation and in 2017 she was inducted into the Northern Kentucky Sports Hall of Fame.
