= 2005 US Open – Men's singles =

Men's singles
- 2005 US Open

Final
- Champion: (Switzerland) Roger Federer
- Runner-up: (United States) Andre Agassi
- Score: 6–3, 2–6, 7–6^{(7–1)}, 6–1

Details
- Draw: 128
- Seeds: 32

Events
Singles	men	women		boys	girls
Doubles	men	women	mixed	boys	girls
WC Singles	men	women	quad
WC Doubles	men	women	quad
Legends	men	women	mixed
- US Open

Defending champion Roger Federer defeated Andre Agassi in the final, 6–3, 2–6, 7–6^{(7–1)}, 6–1 to win the men's singles tennis title at the 2005 US Open. It was his second US Open title and sixth major title overall. This was Agassi's 15th and last appearance in a major final.

This was the first US Open in which future champions Novak Djokovic, Andy Murray and Stan Wawrinka competed in the main draw. Noteworthy in this tournament was a strong performance by American men, despite 2003 champion and former world No. 1 Andy Roddick losing in the first round. In addition to two-time US Open champion Agassi, wildcard James Blake reached the quarterfinals, upsetting world No. 2 Rafael Nadal in the third round before losing to Agassi. Robby Ginepri reached the semifinals and also lost to Agassi.

This marked the last major appearance of former French Open champion Albert Costa.

== Seeds ==
The seeded players are listed below. Roger Federer is the champion; others show the round in which they were eliminated.

1. (Switzerland) Roger Federer (champion)
2. (Spain) Rafael Nadal (third round)
3. (Australia) Lleyton Hewitt (semifinals)
4. (United States) Andy Roddick (first round)
5. (Russia) Marat Safin (withdrew)
6. (Russia) Nikolay Davydenko (second round)
7. (United States) Andre Agassi (final)
8. (Argentina) Guillermo Coria (quarterfinals)
9. (Argentina) Gastón Gaudio (first round)
10. (Argentina) ~~Mariano Puerta (second round)~~
11. (Argentina) David Nalbandian (quarterfinals)
12. (United Kingdom) Tim Henman (first round)
13. (France) Richard Gasquet (fourth round)
14. (Sweden) Thomas Johansson (second round)
15. (Slovakia) Dominik Hrbatý (fourth round)
16. (Czech Republic) Radek Štěpánek (second round)
17. (Spain) David Ferrer (third round)
18. (Croatia) Ivan Ljubičić (third round)
19. (Spain) Tommy Robredo (fourth round)
20. (Spain) Juan Carlos Ferrero (first round)
21. (Chile) Fernando González (third round)
22. (Croatia) Mario Ančić (second round)
23. (Czech Republic) Jiří Novák (second round, withdrew)
24. (Russia) Mikhail Youzhny (third round)
25. (United States) Taylor Dent (third round)
26. (Spain) Feliciano López (second round)
27. (Belgium) Olivier Rochus (third round)
28. (United Kingdom) Greg Rusedski (first round)
29. (Germany) Tommy Haas (third round)
30. (Belarus) Max Mirnyi (third round)
31. (Spain) Carlos Moyà (second round)
32. (Czech Republic) Tomáš Berdych (third round)

== Draw ==
Key

- Q = Qualifier
- WC = Wild card
- LL = Lucky loser
- Alt = Alternate
- ITF = ITF entry
- PR = Protected ranking
- SR = Special ranking
- SE = Special exempt
- JE = Junior exempt
- JR = Junior Accelerator Programme entrant
- CO = College Accelerator Programme entrant
- NG = Next Gen Accelerator Program entrant
- w/o = Walkover
- r = Retired
- d = Defaulted

=== Finals ===
Quarterfinals
1	(Switzerland) Roger Federer	6	6	6
11	(Argentina) David Nalbandian	2	4	1
3	(Australia) Lleyton Hewitt	2	6	3	6	6
(Finland) Jarkko Nieminen	6	1	6	3	1
8	(Argentina) Guillermo Coria	6	1	5	6	5
(United States) Robby Ginepri	4	6	7	3	7
7	(United States) Andre Agassi	3	3	6	6	7^{8}
WC	(United States) James Blake	6	6	3	3	6^{6}

Semifinals
1	(Switzerland) Roger Federer	6	7^{7}	4	6
3	(Australia) Lleyton Hewitt	3	6^{0}	6	3
(United States) Robby Ginepri	4	7	3	6	3
7	(United States) Andre Agassi	6	5	6	4	6

Finals
1	(Switzerland) Roger Federer	6	2	7^{7}	6
7	(United States) Andre Agassi	3	6	6^{1}	1

=== Top half ===
==== Section 1 ====
First round
1	(Switzerland) R Federer	6	6	6
(Czech Republic) I Minář	1	1	1
(France) F Santoro	6	6	6
(Austria) J Melzer	2	1	3
(Spain) A Montañés	6	3	6	2
(Romania) V Hănescu	4	6	3	1^{r}
Q	(Czech Republic) R Vik	7	2	2	2
27	(Belgium) O Rochus	5	6	6	6
20	(Spain) JC Ferrero	5	5	1
Q	(France) A Clément	7	7	6
(Romania) A Pavel	3	6	6	1	4
Q	(United Kingdom) A Murray	6	3	3	6	6
(Germany) N Kiefer	6	6	6
(Czech Republic) J Vaněk	4	2	3
(Ecuador) N Lapentti	5	6^{5}	1
16	(Czech Republic) R Štěpánek	7	7^{7}	6

Second round
1	(Switzerland) R Federer	7	7	7^{7}
(France) F Santoro	5	5	6^{2}
(Spain) A Montañés	6	2	1	3
27	(Belgium) O Rochus	4	6	6	6
Q	(France) A Clément	6	7^{7}	2	6^{4}	6
Q	(United Kingdom) A Murray	2	6^{2}	6	7^{7}	0
(Germany) N Kiefer	4	4	6	6	6
16	(Czech Republic) R Štěpánek	6	6	4	3	3

Third round
1	(Switzerland) R Federer	6	7^{8}	6
27	(Belgium) O Rochus	3	6^{6}	2
Q	(France) A Clément	4	7^{7}	4	1
(Germany) N Kiefer	6	6^{5}	6	6

Fourth round
1	(Switzerland) R Federer	6	6^{3}	6	6
(Germany) N Kiefer	4	7^{7}	3	4

==== Section 2 ====
First round
11	(Argentina) D Nalbandian	6	7	6
Q	(United States) A Bogomolov Jr.	2	5	4
(Netherlands) P Wessels	6^{4}	6	6	6
(Belgium) C Rochus	7^{7}	3	4	4
PR	(Russia) D Tursunov	6	6	6^{7}	6
(Cyprus) M Baghdatis	4	3	7^{9}	2
Q	(South Africa) W Moodie	6	4	5	5
21	(Chile) F González	4	6	7	7
31	(Spain) C Moyà	6	6	2
(France) M Llodra	4	4	1^{r}
(Italy) D Sanguinetti	6	6	7^{7}
(Australia) W Arthurs	3	3	6^{3}
(Thailand) P Srichaphan	6	6	6
PR	(Morocco) Y El Aynaoui	4	3	0
(Czech Republic) T Zíb	2	0	4
6	(Russia) N Davydenko	6	6	6

Second round
11	(Argentina) D Nalbandian	7^{7}	1	6	7^{7}
(Netherlands) P Wessels	6^{4}	6	2	6^{4}
PR	(Russia) D Tursunov	4	6	4	3
21	(Chile) F González	6	3	6	6
31	(Spain) C Moyà	6	1	2	4
(Italy) D Sanguinetti	3	6	6	6
(Thailand) P Srichaphan	6	7	6
6	(Russia) N Davydenko	4	5	3

Third round
11	(Argentina) D Nalbandian	7	6	6
21	(Chile) F González	5	3	0
(Italy) D Sanguinetti	6	4	6^{2}	7^{8}	7^{7}
(Thailand) P Srichaphan	3	6	7^{7}	6^{6}	6^{5}

Fourth round
11	(Argentina) D Nalbandian	4	7^{7}	6	6
(Italy) D Sanguinetti	6	6^{4}	4	2

==== Section 3 ====
First round
3	(Australia) L Hewitt	6	6	6
(Spain) A Costa	1	2	1
(Argentina) J Acasuso	4	6	6	7^{13}
(Peru) L Horna	6	3	4	6^{11}
(Denmark) K Carlsen	6^{4}	5	4
(Spain) N Almagro	7^{7}	7	6
(Germany) L Burgsmüller	3	6	1	4
25	(United States) T Dent	6	3	6	6
17	(Spain) D Ferrer	4	6	6^{4}	6	6
(Argentina) A Calleri	6	4	7^{7}	1	1
WC	(Australia) M Philippoussis	4	2	5
PR	(Slovakia) K Kučera	6	6	7
Q	(Switzerland) M Lammer	3	6	7	6
(United States) K Kim	6	3	5	4
(Italy) A Seppi	2	4	7^{8}	2
15	(Slovakia) D Hrbatý	6	6	6^{6}	6

Second round
3	(Australia) L Hewitt	7^{8}	7^{7}	6
(Argentina) J Acasuso	6^{6}	6^{3}	2
(Spain) N Almagro	3	2	6	5
25	(United States) T Dent	6	6	4	7
17	(Spain) D Ferrer	6	6	6
PR	(Slovakia) K Kučera	3	0	2
Q	(Switzerland) M Lammer	1	1	3
15	(Slovakia) D Hrbatý	6	6	6

Third round
3	(Australia) L Hewitt	6	3	6^{2}	6	7
25	(United States) T Dent	3	6	7^{7}	2	5
17	(Spain) D Ferrer	7^{9}	5	5	5
15	(Slovakia) D Hrbatý	6^{7}	7	7	7

Fourth round
3	(Australia) L Hewitt	6	6	6
15	(Slovakia) D Hrbatý	1	4	2

==== Section 4 ====
First round
12	(United Kingdom) T Henman	4	2	2
(Spain) F Verdasco	6	6	6
(France) P-H Mathieu	2	6	5	2
Q	(Chile) P Capdeville	6	4	7	6
(France) G Monfils	5	6	6^{5}	6	5
(Serbia and Montenegro) N Djokovic	7	4	7^{7}	0	7
(South Korea) H-t Lee	2	1	5
22	(Croatia) M Ančić	6	6	7
30	(Belarus) M Mirnyi	6	7	6
(United States) J Gimelstob	2	5	2
(France) F Serra	6	6	4	6
(Austria) S Koubek	1	4	6	4
(Finland) J Nieminen	6	2	7	0	7
(Slovakia) K Beck	4	6	5	6	5
PR	(Germany) A Popp	1	3	3
LL	(Germany) B Phau	6	6	6

Second round
(Spain) F Verdasco	6	6	7
Q	(Chile) P Capdeville	4	2	5
(Serbia and Montenegro) N Djokovic	6	5	7^{7}	6
22	(Croatia) M Ančić	3	7	6^{4}	3
30	(Belarus) M Mirnyi	7^{7}	6^{4}	6	7^{7}
(France) F Serra	6^{5}	7^{7}	4	6^{4}
(Finland) J Nieminen	6	6	5	6
LL	(Germany) B Phau	2	4	7	4

Third round
(Spain) F Verdasco	6	4	6^{2}	6	6
(Serbia and Montenegro) N Djokovic	1	6	7^{7}	4	4
30	(Belarus) M Mirnyi	3	6^{5}	6	3
(Finland) J Nieminen	6	7^{7}	3	6

Fourth round
(Spain) F Verdasco	2	6^{6}	3
(Finland) J Nieminen	6	7^{8}	6

=== Bottom half ===
==== Section 5 ====
First round
8	(Argentina) G Coria	7^{7}	6	6
(Spain) F Mantilla	6^{5}	1	3
Q	(United States) G Weiner	4	2	0
(United States) V Spadea	6	6	6
(Sweden) R Söderling	6^{3}	7^{7}	6	6
(Argentina) JI Chela	7^{7}	6^{4}	3	4
(Italy) F Volandri	2	6	6^{5}	1
26	(Spain) F López	6	4	7^{7}	6
23	(Czech Republic) J Novák	6	6	6
(Belgium) D Norman	4	4	2
WC	(United States) J-M Gambill	6^{4}	2	3
(Chile) N Massú	7^{7}	6	6
(Switzerland) S Wawrinka	2	6	7^{8}	6^{2}	7
WC	(United States) R Ram	6	4	6^{6}	7^{7}	5
Q	(Israel) N Okun	6^{4}	7^{7}	4	0
10	(Argentina) ~~M Puerta~~	7^{7}	6^{3}	6	6

Second round
8	(Argentina) G Coria	6	6	6
(United States) V Spadea	2	3	2
(Sweden) R Söderling	6	6	7^{8}
26	(Spain) F López	2	2	6^{6}
23	(Czech Republic) J Novák
(Chile) N Massú	w/o
(Switzerland) S Wawrinka	3	6	6	6^{4}	6
10	(Argentina) ~~M Puerta~~	6	4	3	7^{7}	1

Third round
8	(Argentina) G Coria	6	6^{4}	6	6
(Sweden) R Söderling	2	7^{7}	1	4
(Chile) N Massú	6	6	6
(Switzerland) S Wawrinka	4	3	0

Fourth round
8	(Argentina) G Coria	6	2	6^{5}	6	6
(Chile) N Massú	4	6	7^{7}	2	2

==== Section 6 ====
First round
13	(France) R Gasquet	6	6	1	6^{4}	6
(Spain) A Martín	2	3	6	7^{7}	4
Q	(Italy) G Galimberti	7^{7}	6	6
WC	(United States) D Young	6^{4}	1	2
(France) C Saulnier	6^{7}	7^{7}	6	6
(Serbia and Montenegro) J Tipsarević	7^{9}	6^{3}	4	3
Q	(Germany) T Summerer	3	6^{4}	3
18	(Croatia) I Ljubičić	6	7^{7}	6
29	(Germany) T Haas	3	6	6	6
Q	(Australia) P Luczak	6	3	2	3
(Italy) P Starace	1	4	6	6^{4}
(Germany) R Schüttler	6	6	1	7^{7}
(United States) R Ginepri	6	6	7^{7}
(Spain) G García López	3	2	6^{5}
(Luxembourg) G Müller	7^{7}	7^{10}	7^{7}
4	(United States) A Roddick	6^{4}	6^{8}	6^{1}

Second round
13	(France) R Gasquet	6	3	6	3
Q	(Italy) G Galimberti	1	6	3	2^{r}
(France) C Saulnier	6^{5}	7	4	4
18	(Croatia) I Ljubičić	7^{7}	5	6	6
29	(Germany) T Haas	7^{7}	6	6
(Germany) R Schüttler	6^{5}	2	0
(United States) R Ginepri	6	6	6
(Luxembourg) G Müller	1	1	4

Third round
13	(France) R Gasquet	3	7^{8}	6^{7}	6	6
18	(Croatia) I Ljubičić	6	6^{6}	7^{9}	3	2
29	(Germany) T Haas	5	7^{7}	4	6	3
(United States) R Ginepri	7	6^{3}	6	2	6

Fourth round
13	(France) R Gasquet	3	6	7^{10}	4	0
(United States) R Ginepri	6	3	6^{8}	6	6

==== Section 7 ====
First round
7	(United States) A Agassi	6	6	6
(Romania) R Sabău	3	3	1
(United States) M Fish	6^{4}	3	7	6^{4}
(Croatia) I Karlović	7^{7}	6	5	7^{7}
(Argentina) J Mónaco	7^{7}	2	1	4
(Brazil) R Mello	6^{2}	6	6	6
(Germany) P Kohlschreiber	6^{6}	6^{4}	4
32	(Czech Republic) T Berdych	7^{8}	7^{7}	6
24	(Russia) M Youzhny	6	6	6
(Germany) F Mayer	1	0	2
(Germany) T Behrend	3	3	0
Q	(Sweden) J Björkman	6	6	6
(Czech Republic) J Hernych	2	5	2
(Belgium) X Malisse	6	7	6
WC	(United States) B Baker	7^{11}	6	6
9	(Argentina) G Gaudio	6^{9}	2	4

Second round
7	(United States) A Agassi	7^{7}	7^{7}	7^{7}
(Croatia) I Karlović	6^{4}	6^{5}	6^{4}
(Brazil) R Mello	3	2	0
32	(Czech Republic) T Berdych	6	6	6
24	(Russia) M Youzhny	6	6	6
Q	(Sweden) J Björkman	4	4	3
(Belgium) X Malisse	6^{5}	6	6	6
WC	(United States) B Baker	7^{7}	2	3	4

Third round
7	(United States) A Agassi	3	6	6	7^{7}
32	(Czech Republic) T Berdych	6	1	4	6^{2}
24	(Russia) M Youzhny	7	6	1	5	6^{1}
(Belgium) X Malisse	5	1	6	7	7^{7}

Fourth round
7	(United States) A Agassi	6	6	6^{5}	4	6
(Belgium) X Malisse	3	4	7^{7}	6	2

==== Section 8 ====
First round
14	(Sweden) T Johansson	6	6	6
(Argentina) M Zabaleta	3	4	3
(Spain) Ó Hernández	2	3	2
(France) S Grosjean	6	6	6
(United States) P Goldstein	2	7^{7}	3	6^{3}
PR	(Brazil) G Kuerten	6	6^{5}	6	7^{7}
Q	(Italy) D Bracciali	6	3	4	2
19	(Spain) T Robredo	3	6	6	6
28	(United Kingdom) G Rusedski	5	6^{3}	3
WC	(United States) J Blake	7	7^{7}	6
Q	(Belgium) G Elseneer	4	4	2
(Russia) I Andreev	6	6	6
Q	(Switzerland) G Bastl	6^{4}	0	7^{7}	6	6^{5}
WC	(United States) S Jenkins	7^{7}	6	6^{1}	4	7^{7}
WC	(United States) B Reynolds	3	3	4
2	(Spain) R Nadal	6	6	6

Second round
14	(Sweden) T Johansson	3	2	6	2
(France) S Grosjean	6	6	4	6
PR	(Brazil) G Kuerten	7	6^{3}	3	2
19	(Spain) T Robredo	5	7^{7}	6	6
WC	(United States) J Blake	6	6	6
(Russia) I Andreev	2	2	4
WC	(United States) S Jenkins	4	5	4
2	(Spain) R Nadal	6	7	6

Third round
(France) S Grosjean	4	5	7^{7}	6^{3}
19	(Spain) T Robredo	6	7	6^{3}	7^{7}
WC	(United States) J Blake	6	4	6	6
2	(Spain) R Nadal	4	6	3	1

Fourth round
19	(Spain) T Robredo	6	5	2	3
WC	(United States) J Blake	4	7	6	6

Preceded by 2005 Wimbledon Championships – Men's singles	Grand Slam men's singles	Succeeded by 2006 Australian Open – Men's singles
