= 2010 PBZ Zagreb Indoors =

- Date: 1–7 February
- Edition: 8th
- Category: ATP World Tour 250 series
- Draw: 32S / 16D
- Prize money: €450,000
- Surface: Hard / indoor
- Location: Zagreb, Croatia
- Venue: Dom Sportova

Champions

Singles
- (Croatia) Marin Čilić

Doubles
- (Austria) Jürgen Melzer / (Germany) Philipp Petzschner
- PBZ Zagreb Indoors

The 2010 PBZ Zagreb Indoors was an ATP men's tennis tournament played on indoor hard courts. It was the eighth overall edition of the Zagreb Indoors, and was part of the ATP World Tour 250 series of the 2010 ATP World Tour. It took place in Zagreb, Croatia from 1 February through 7 February 2010. First-seeded Marin Čilić won the singles title.

== Finals ==
=== Singles ===
(Croatia) Marin Čilić defeated (Germany) Michael Berrer, 6–4, 6–7^{(5–7)}, 6–3

- It was Cilic's second title of the year and 5th of his career. It was his second win at the event, also winning in 2009.

=== Doubles ===
(Austria) Jürgen Melzer / (Germany) Philipp Petzschner defeated (France) Arnaud Clément / (Belgium) Olivier Rochus, 3–6, 6–3, [10–8]

== ATP entrants ==
=== Seeds ===
Country	Player	Rank^{1}	Seed
CRO	Marin Čilić	14	1
CRO	Ivan Ljubičić	24	2
AUT	Jürgen Melzer	27	3
SRB	Viktor Troicki	30	4
SRB	Janko Tipsarević	36	5
GER	Benjamin Becker	38	6
CRO	Ivo Karlović	39	7
KAZ	Evgeny Korolev	53	8

- Rankings are as of January 18, 2010

=== Other entrants ===
The following players received wildcards into the singles main draw:

- (Croatia) Ivan Dodig
- (Croatia) Petar Jelenić
- (Croatia) Antonio Veić

The following players received entry from the qualifying draw:

- (Belgium) Ruben Bemelmans
- (Serbia) Ilija Bozoljac
- (France) Alexandre Sidorenko
- (Sweden) Andreas Vinciguerra
