= Puerto Rico at the 2011 Parapan American Games =

Sporting event delegation

Puerto Rico will participate in the 2011 Parapan American Games.

== Archery ==
Puerto Rico will send one male athlete to compete.

== Table tennis ==
Puerto Rico will send two male table tennis players to compete.

== Wheelchair tennis ==
Puerto Rico will send one male athlete to compete.

== See also ==
- Puerto Rico at the 2011 Pan American Games
- Puerto Rico at the 2012 Summer Paralympics
