= Angélica Bernal =

Colombian wheelchair tennis player

- Full name: María Angélica Bernal Villalobos
- Country (sports): Colombia
- Born: 27 March 1995 (age 31) Bogotá, Colombia
- Turned pro: 2007
- Plays: Right-handed (one-handed backhand)

Singles
- Career record: 216–104
- Highest ranking: No. 7 (27 May 2024)
- Current ranking: No. 7 (27 May 2024)

Grand Slam singles results
- Australian Open: QF (2021, 2025)
- French Open: QF (2021, 2022)
- Wimbledon: QF (2021)
- US Open: SF (2020)

Other tournaments
- Paralympic Games: 1R (2012, 2016)

Doubles
- Career record: 107–99
- Highest ranking: No. 13 (13 May 2024)
- Current ranking: No. 13 (03 June 2024)

Grand Slam doubles results
- Australian Open: SF (2021, 2024)
- French Open: SF (2021)
- Wimbledon: F (2025)
- US Open: SF (2020, 2021)

Other doubles tournaments
- Paralympic Games: QF (2012)
Medal record
Representing Colombia
Women's wheelchair tennis
Parapan American Games
Gold medal – first place	2019 Lima	Singles
Silver medal – second place	2011 Guadalajara	Doubles
Silver medal – second place	2015 Toronto	Doubles
Silver medal – second place	2019 Lima	Doubles
Silver medal – second place	2023 Santiago	Singles
Bronze medal – third place	2011 Guadalajara	Singles
Bronze medal – third place	2023 Santiago	Doubles

María Angélica Bernal Villalobos (born 27 March 1995) is a Colombian wheelchair tennis player who competes in international level events. She is a multiple Parapan American Games medalist and has competed in the Paralympic Games twice.

Bernal has phocomelia and was born without her right leg and uses a prosthetic since she was two years old. She played wheelchair tennis aged eleven when she was inspired by Esther Vergeer and Maria Sharapova. She participated at the 2020 US Open for the first time and was a semifinalist in both the wheelchair women's singles and doubles events.

== Grand Slam Finals ==
=== Wheelchair doubles: 1 runner up ===
Result	Year	Championship	Surface	Partner	Opponents	Score
Loss	2025	Wimbledon	Grass	(France) Ksénia Chasteau	(China) Li Xiaohui (China) Wang Ziying	3–6, 1–6

== Career statistics ==
=== Grand Slam performance timelines ===
Key
W	F	SF	QF	#R	RR	Q#	DNQ	A	NH

(W) winner; (F) finalist; (SF) semifinalist; (QF) quarterfinalist; (#R) rounds 4, 3, 2, 1; (RR) round-robin stage; (Q#) qualification round; (DNQ) did not qualify; (A) absent; (NH) not held; (SR) strike rate (events won / competed); (W–L) win–loss record.
To avoid confusion and double counting, these charts are updated at the conclusion of a tournament or when the player's participation has ended.

==== Wheelchair singles ====
Tournament	2020	2021	2022	2023	2024	2025	2026	SR	W–L	Win %
Australian Open	A	QF	A	1R	1R	QF	1R	0 / 0	1–5	17%
French Open	A	QF	QF	1R	1R	1R	1R	0 / 0	1–6	14%
Wimbledon	A	QF	A	A	1R	1R	1R	0 / 0	0–4	0%
US Open	SF	QF	1R	QF	NH	QF		0 / 0	3–5	38%
Win–loss	1–1	0–4	1–2	1–3	0–3	2–4	0–3	0 / 0	5–20	20%

==== Wheelchair doubles ====
Tournament	2020	2021	2022	2023	2024	2025	SR	W–L	Win %	
Australian Open	A	SF	A	QF	SF	QF	QF	0 / 0	0–5	0%
French Open	A	SF	QF	QF	QF	QF	QF	0 / 0	0–6	0%
Wimbledon	A	SF	A	A	QF	F	QF	0 / 1	2–5	29%
US Open	SF	SF	QF	QF	NH	QF		0 / 0	0–5	0%
Win–loss	0–1	0–3	0–2	0–3	1–3	2–4	0–3	0 / 1	3–19	14%
