= Mackenzie Soldan =

American wheelchair basketball and tennis player

Personal information
- Nationality: United States
- Born: May 14, 1992 (age 34) Saginaw, Michigan, U.S.
- Height: 5 ft 1 in (155 cm)
Medal record
Women's wheelchair tennis
Representing United States
Parapan American Games
Gold medal – first place	2011 Guadalajara	Women's singles
Gold medal – first place	2011 Guadalajara	Women's doubles
Women's wheelchair basketball
World Championship
Bronze medal – third place	2022 Dubai	Team

Mackenzie Soldan (born May 14, 1992) is an American wheelchair basketball and wheelchair tennis player. She represented the United States at the 2011 Parapan American Games where she won two gold medals, 2012 London Paralympics in wheelchair tennis and 2016 Rio Paralympics in wheelchair basketball. She has played for the U.S. women's wheelchair basketball team since 2013.

== Early life ==
Soldan was born in Saginaw, Michigan. She lost the use of her legs because of a spinal cord tumor at age two. At age 18 she graduated from Christian Academy of Louisville. When she was in high school, she was a top-ranked player in the Junior wheelchair tennis team. She was also the Women's division' number one player as well. In 2010, due to her passion for basketball she was signed to the University of Alabama's wheelchair basketball team, where she earned another national number one rank.

== Career ==
In late October 2011, she got a phone call saying that she might be qualified for the Parapan American Games. Soldan decided to go, and brought home two gold medals for singles and doubles. Besides winning those medals she also carried an American flag which was given by her coach.

She represented the United States at the 2022 Wheelchair Basketball World Championships and won a bronze medal.

== Personal life ==
Soldan currently resides in Tuscaloosa, Alabama. Besides sports, she plays the guitar and piano as a hobby. In 2007, she participated at the U.S. Under 19 Wheelchair Basketball Team and in 2011 won a gold medal in the U.S. Under 25 Team. The same year, Mackenzie was a member of Collegiate National Wheelchair Basketball Championship and represented University of Alabama there. In 2016, she graduated with a master's degree in marketing.
