= Jon Rydberg =

American wheelchair tennis player

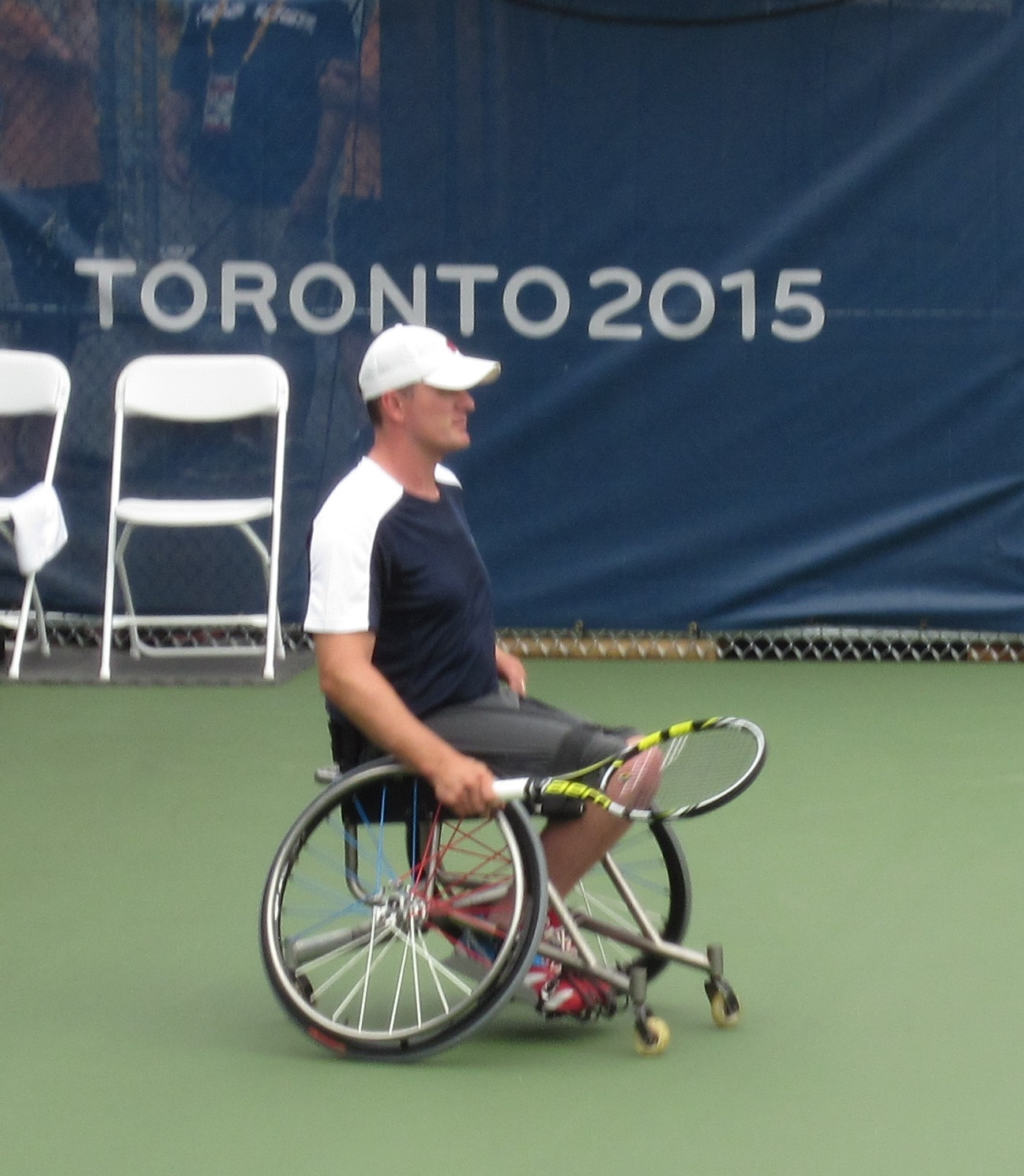
- Country (sports): United States
- Born: October 7, 1977 (age 49) Grantsburg, Wisconsin, U.S.
- Height: 5 ft 10 in (178 cm)

Singles
- Highest ranking: No. 11 (28 January 2002)
Medal record
Men's wheelchair tennis
Representing United States
Parapan American Games
| Gold medal – first place | 2007 Rio de Janeiro | Men's singles |
| Gold medal – first place | 2011 Guadalajara | Men's doubles |
| Silver medal – second place | 2015 Toronto | Men's singles |

Jon Rydberg (born October 7, 1977) is a former American wheelchair tennis and wheelchair basketball player.

== Biography ==
Rydberg was born in Grantsburg, Wisconsin and raised in Pine City, Minnesota. He became physically disabled when his family pickup truck rolled on top of him at one year old. He played tennis since 1988 but was only able to play in exhibition matches in 1992 due to the United States Tennis Association rules at the time. Rydberg was also an accomplished wheelchair basketball player. He began playing wheelchair basketball since grade 8 and earned a full sports scholarship from University of Texas-Arlington. His university team won the national championship in 1997. After graduation, Rydberg focused on wheelchair tennis. He was a member of the 2004 United States Paralympic team that competed in Athens, Greece. After 2004, he left wheelchair tennis and returned to wheelchair basketball, played for the Minnesota Rolling Timberwolves program that the Minnesota Timberwolves sponsors. He played in the All-Star Wheelchair Classic during the 2006 NBA All-Star Weekend. In 2007, he returned to focus on wheelchair tennis. After winning gold at the 2007 Parapan American Games in Brazil he became the top-ranked wheelchair tennis player in the United States and ranked 12th in the world. At the 2008 Summer Paralympics, he competed in both singles and doubles. In the singles event he lost in the third round to eventual gold medalist Shingo Kunieda, and in doubles he and his partner Stephen Welch were knocked out in the second round. He also competed at the 2012 Summer Paralympics and 2016 Summer Paralympics, losing in round of 16 in both games. And was inducted into the USTA Northern Hall of Fame in 2025

He currently resides in the Woodbury, MN with his family of four including his wife Sarah and his son's Elias and Atticus. And used to own a clothing line, Midevil [sic?], Inc.
