= Johana Martínez =

Colombian wheelchair tennis player

- Full name: Johana Martinez Vega
- Country (sports): Colombia
- Born: 31 October 1980 (age 44); Bogotá, Colombia
- Plays: Right-handed (one-handed backhand)

Singles
- Highest ranking: No. 21 (10 October 2011)
- Current ranking: No. 177 (23 August 2021)

Other tournaments
- Paralympic Games: 1R (2008, 2020)

Doubles
- Paralympic Games: QF (2012)
Medal record
Parapan American Games
Silver medal – second place	2011 Guadalajara	Women's doubles
Silver medal – second place	2015 Toronto	Women's doubles
Silver medal – second place	2019 Lima	Women's doubles

Johana Martínez Vega (born 31 October 1980) is a Colombian wheelchair tennis player. She is a three-time silver medalist at the Parapan American Games in the women's doubles events in 2011, 2015 and 2019. She often collaborates with compatriot Angélica Bernal in women's doubles events. She is the first ever South American female wheelchair tennis player to have competed at the Paralympics.

== Biography ==
She was born with cerebral palsy. She took up the sport of wheelchair tennis in 2003. She graduated as a sports manager from the Francisco José de Caldas District University.

She made her maiden appearance at the Paralympics representing Colombia at the 2008 Summer Paralympics. She also went onto become the first Colombian wheelchair tennis player as well as the first woman wheelchair tennis player from South America to take part at the Paralympics. She competed in the women's singles event and was eliminated by Belgium's Annick Sevenans in the round of 32 at the 2008 Summer Paralympics. She also participated at the 2012 Summer Paralympics and eventually reached quarterfinals of the women's doubles event.

She could not compete at the 2016 Summer Paralympics after undergoing a surgery. In January 2019, she along with Johanna Sossa were jointly named as Americas Paralympic Committee Athlete of the Month for January following their performances which led Colombia to qualify for the 2019 ITF World Team Cup Finals.

She won the 2020 UNIQLO Spirit Award which was awarded by the International Tennis Federation. She was nominated by the Colombian Tennis Federation for the 2020 UNIQLO Spirit Award in recognition of her outstanding contributions to wheelchair tennis in Colombia both as a player and ambassador of the sport for nearly 20 years.

She also represented Colombia at the 2020 Summer Paralympics in her third as well as final Paralympics at the age of 40 and competed in both women's singles and women's doubles events.
