= Wheelchair tennis at the 2015 Parapan American Games =

- Date: August 8–14
- Edition: 4th
- Location: University of Toronto Scarborough Tennis Centre
← 2011 ·	Parapan American Games	· 2019 →

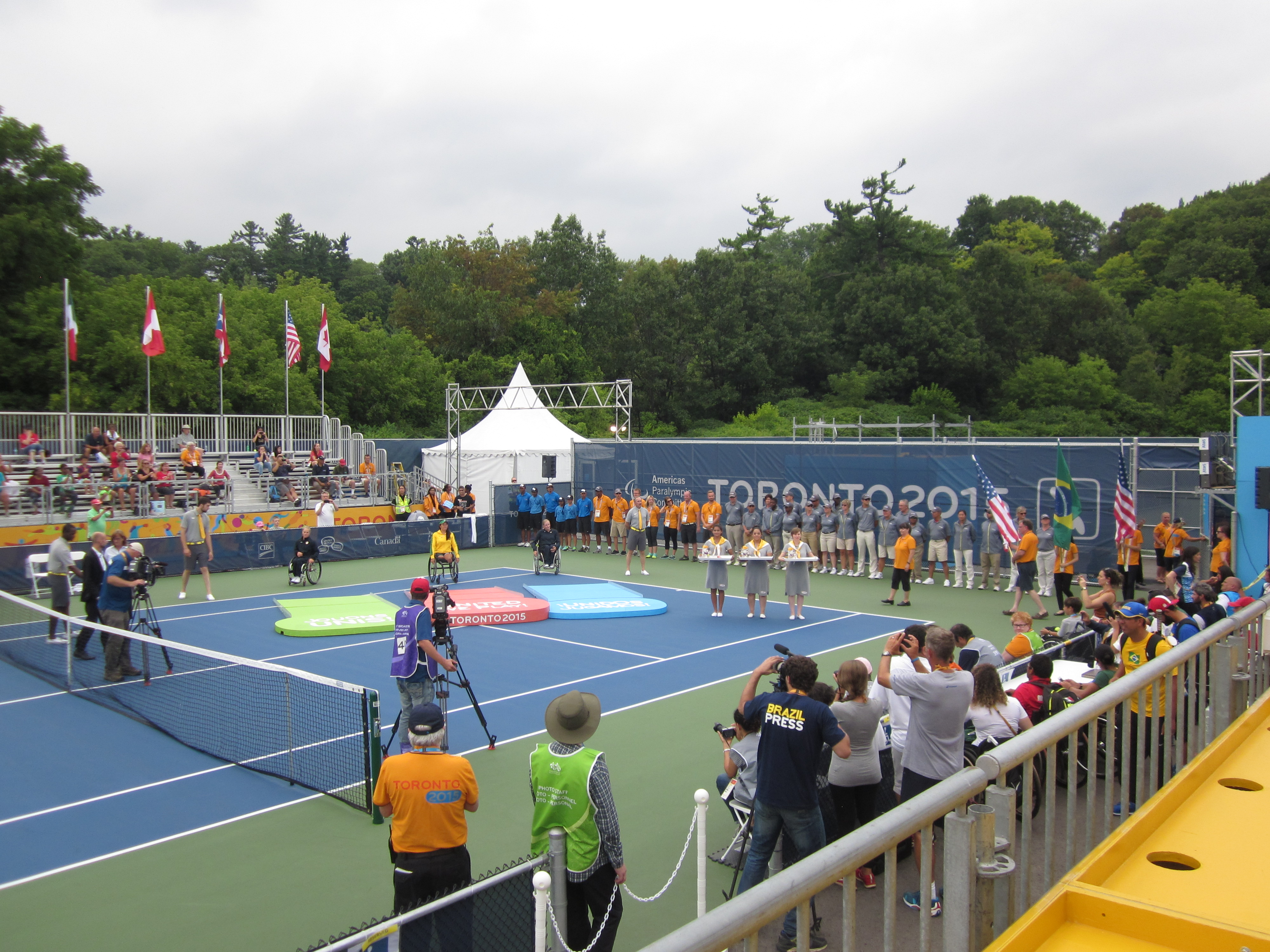
University of Toronto Scarborough Tennis Centre was the venue for the wheelchair tennis competition

Wheelchair tennis event at the 2015 Parapan American Games was played from 8 to 14 August 2015 at the University of Toronto Scarborough Tennis Centre in Toronto.

The original competition was proposed to be held at Rexall Centre, consistent with the Games' venue plan in hosting Paralympic sport at the same venue as their Olympic counterpart. However, the Parapan American Games schedule conflicted with 2015 Rogers Cup's women competition and the wheelchair tennis competition was forced to relocate. As a result, the University of Toronto Scarborough Tennis Centre was constructed for the wheelchair tennis competition.

== Medal summary ==
=== Medal table ===
Rank	Nation	Gold	Silver	Bronze	Total
1	Brazil	2	1	1	4
2	Argentina	2	0	0	2
3	United States	0	2	2	4
4	Colombia	0	1	0	1
5	Canada	0	0	1	1
Totals (5 entries)		4	4	4	12

=== Medal events ===
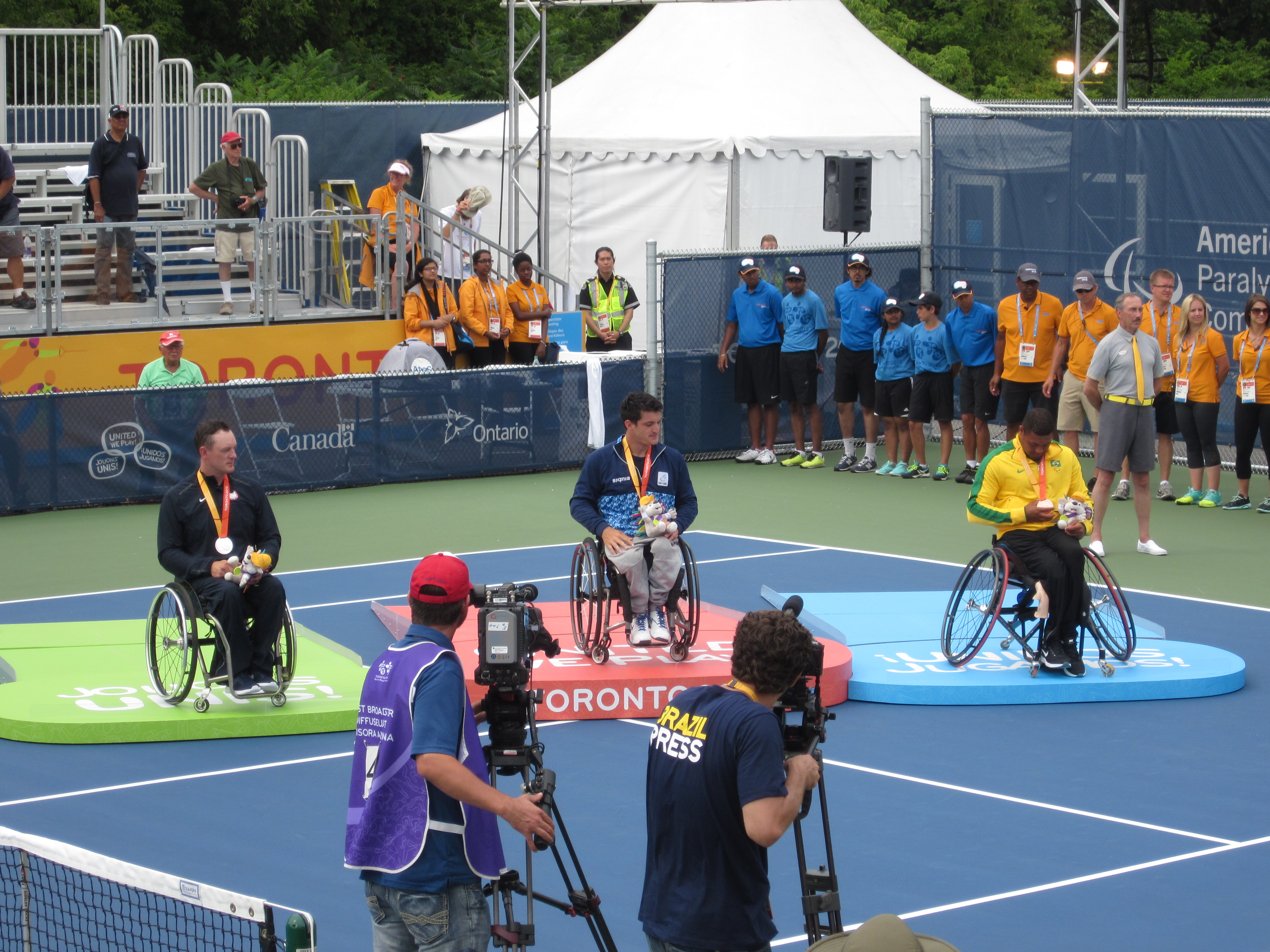
2015 Pan American Games Wheelchair tennis Men's singles medalists

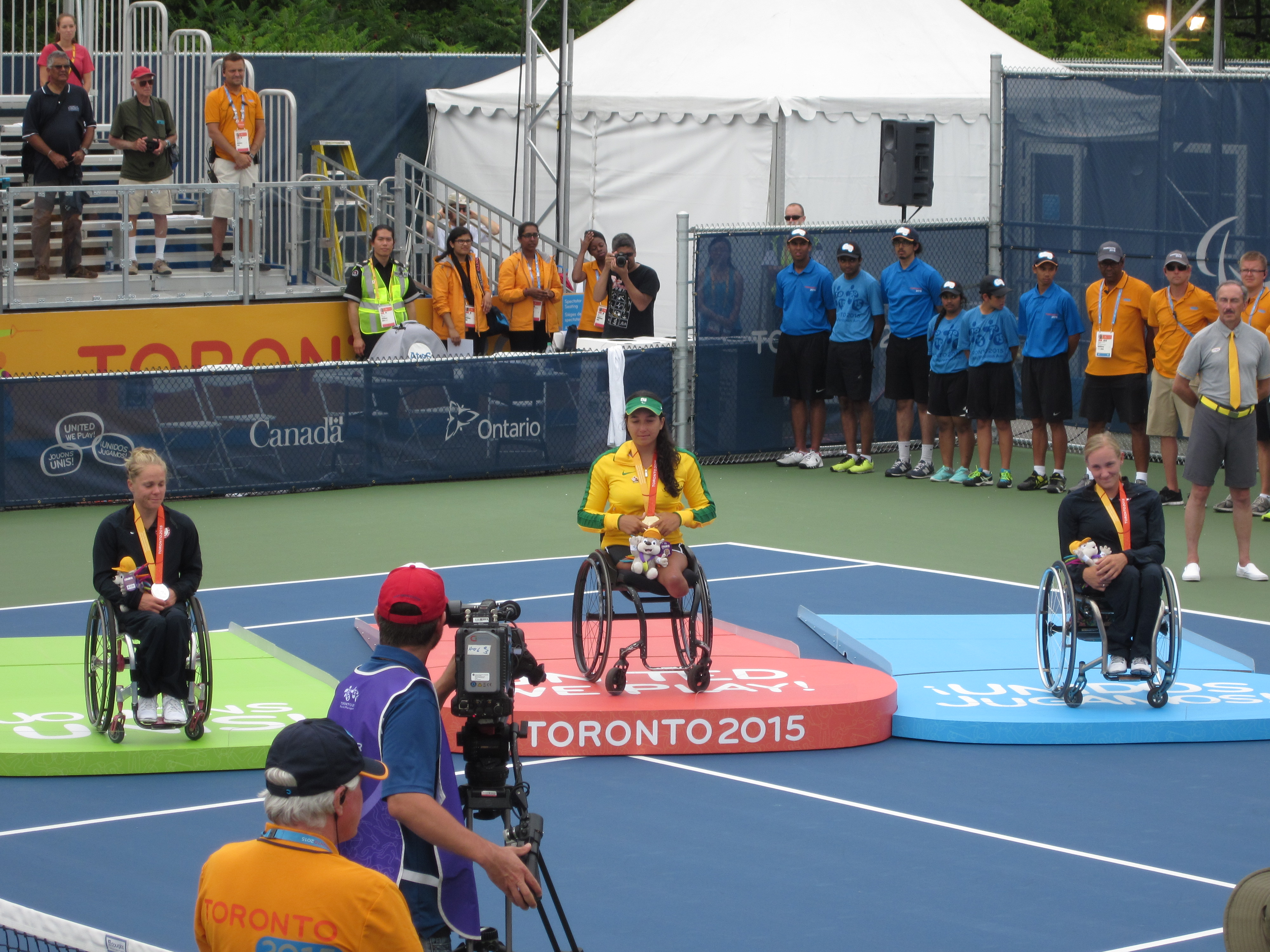
2015 Pan American Games Wheelchair tennis Women's singles medalists

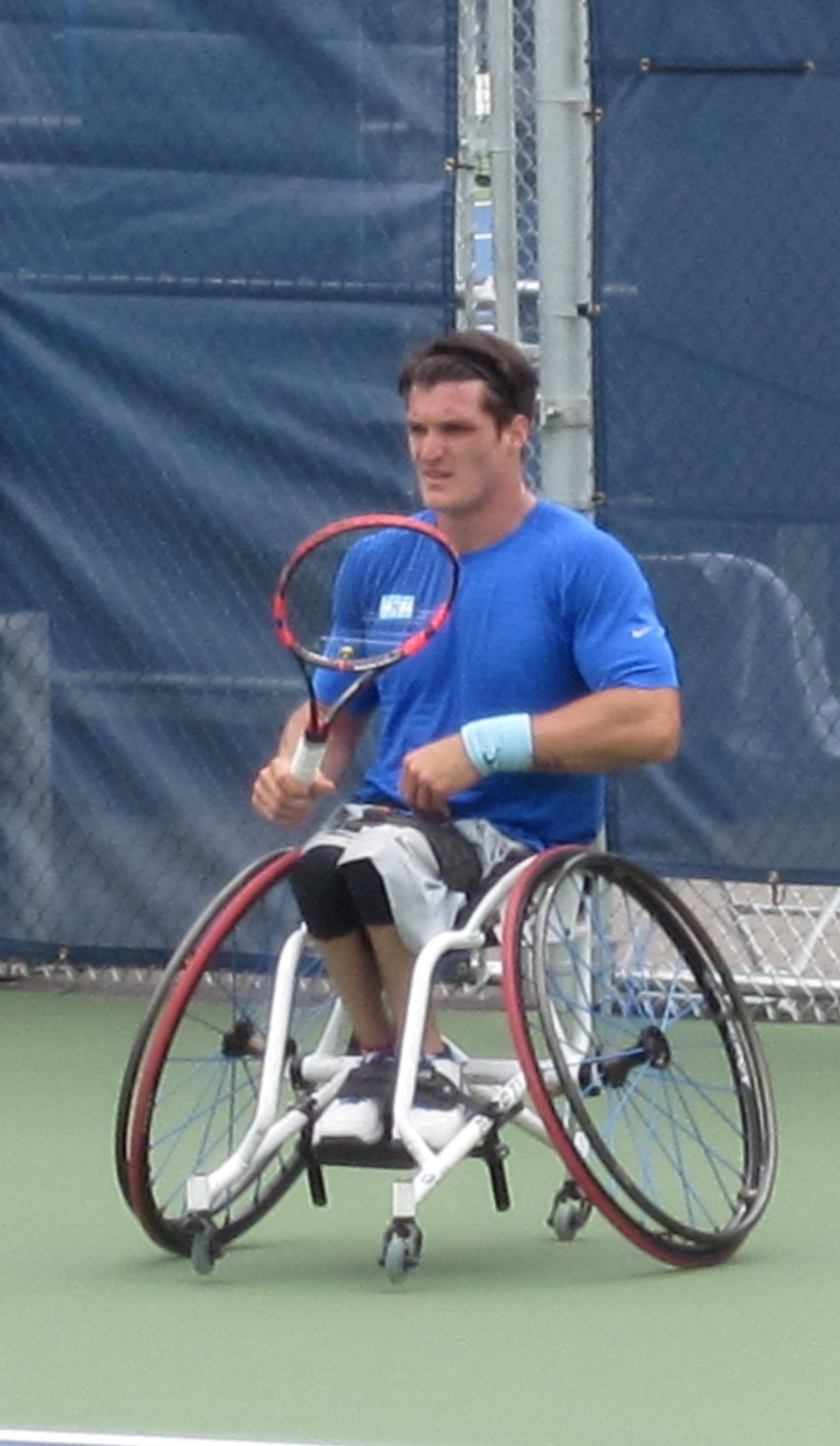
Men's singles and doubles gold medalist Gustavo Fernández

Event	Gold	Silver	Bronze
Men's singles	Argentina (ARG); Gustavo Fernandez	United States (USA); Jon Rydberg	Brazil (BRA); Daniel Rodrigues
Women's singles	Brazil (BRA); Natália Mayara	United States (USA); Kaitlyn Verfuerth	United States (USA); Emmy Kaiser
Men's doubles	Argentina (ARG); Ezequiel Casco; Gustavo Fernandez	Brazil (BRA); Daniel Rodrigues; Carlos Santos	Canada (CAN); Philippe Bédard; Joel Dembe
Women's doubles	Brazil (BRA); Rejane Cândida; Natália Mayara	Colombia (COL); Angélica Bernal; Johana Martínez	United States (USA); Emmy Kaiser; Kaitlyn Verfuerth
