= Gustavo Fernández (tennis) =

Argentine wheelchair tennis player

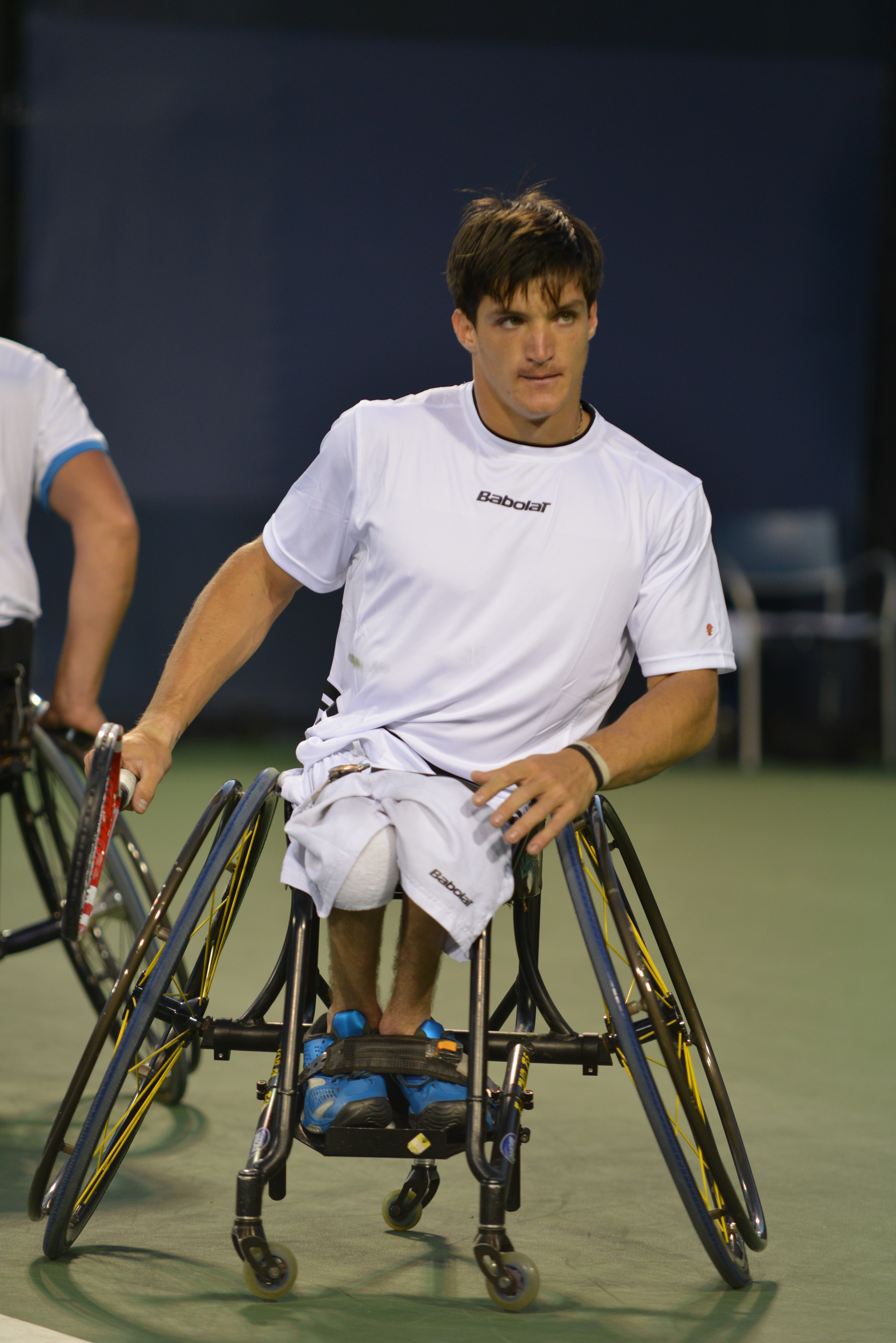
- Fernández in 2013
- Country (sports): Argentina
- Born: 20 January 1994 (age 32) Río Tercero, Argentina
- Plays: Right-handed (one-handed backhand)

Singles
- Career record: 369–131
- Highest ranking: No. 1 (10 July 2017)
- Current ranking: No. 4 (12 June 2023)

Grand Slam singles results
- Australian Open: W (2017, 2019)
- French Open: W (2016, 2019)
- Wimbledon: W (2019)
- US Open: F (2014, 2025)

Other tournaments
- Masters: W (2026)
- Paralympic Games: Bronze Medal (2024)

Doubles
- Career record: 203–144
- Highest ranking: No. 3 (9 September 2019)
- Current ranking: No. 7 (12 June 2023)

Grand Slam doubles results
- Australian Open: W (2026)
- French Open: W (2019)
- Wimbledon: W (2015, 2022)
- US Open: W (2025)

Other doubles tournaments
- Masters Doubles: W (2022)
- Paralympic Games: QF (2016)
Medal record
Paralympic Games
Bronze medal – third place	2024 Paris	Singles
Parapan American Games
Gold medal – first place	2011 Guadalajara	Singles
Gold medal – first place	2015 Toronto	Singles
Gold medal – first place	2015 Toronto	Doubles
Gold medal – first place	2019 Lima	Singles
Gold medal – first place	2019 Lima	Doubles
Silver medal – second place	2011 Guadalajara	Doubles
- Last updated on: 1 February 2026.

Gustavo Fernández (born 20 January 1994) is an Argentine professional wheelchair tennis player. Fernández has been ranked as the world No. 1 in men's singles.

== Early and personal life ==
He was just 17 months old when he suffered a spinal stroke (also known as Spinal Cord Infarction). This caused an irreversible spinal cord injury resulting in paraplegia, leaving him paralyzed from the waist down and dependent on a wheelchair.

In December 2025, he announced on Instagram that he and his partner, Florencia Tagliaferro, were expecting a baby boy whom they would call René.

== Wheelchair tennis career ==
Fernández has won major singles titles at the 2016 French Open, the 2017 Australian Open, the 2019 Australian Open, the 2019 French Open, and the 2019 Wimbledon Championships. In doubles, he has won major titles at the 2015 Wimbledon Championships partnering Nicolas Peifer, and the 2019 French Open and 2022 Wimbledon Championships partnering Shingo Kunieda.

Since mid to late 2025, he has played men's doubles with Tokito Oda. They won the 2025 US Open and the 2026 Australian Open and reached the final of Wimbledon 2026 where they lost to Alfie Hewett and Gordon Reid.

== Career statistics ==
=== Grand Slam performance timelines ===
Key
W	F	SF	QF	#R	RR	Q#	DNQ	A	NH

(W) winner; (F) finalist; (SF) semifinalist; (QF) quarterfinalist; (#R) rounds 4, 3, 2, 1; (RR) round-robin stage; (Q#) qualification round; (DNQ) did not qualify; (A) absent; (NH) not held; (SR) strike rate (events won / competed); (W–L) win–loss record.
To avoid confusion and double counting, these charts are updated at the conclusion of a tournament or when the player's participation has ended.

==== Wheelchair singles ====
Tournament	2013	2014	2015	2016	2017	2018	2019	2020	2021	2022	2023	2024	2025	2026	SR	W–L	Win %
Australian Open	QF	F	SF	SF	W	QF	W	QF	QF	QF	SF	A	SF	SF	2 / 13	14–10	58%
French Open	QF	SF	QF	W	F	F	W	SF	SF	F	SF	F	SF	SF	2 / 14	22–11	67%
Wimbledon	NH	NH	NH	QF	F	F	W	NH	SF	SF	QF	SF	SF		1 / 8	11–7	61%
US Open	QF	F	QF	NH	SF	SF	SF	SF	SF	1R	SF	NH	F		0 / 11	13–10	57%
Win–loss	0–3	5–3	1–3	4–2	8–3	5–4	10–1	2–3	3–4	4–4	6–4	4–1	9–4	3–1	5 / 43	58–37	61%

==== Wheelchair doubles ====
Tournament	2013	2014	2015	2016	2017	2018	2019	2020	2021	2022	2023	2024	2025	2026	SR	W–L	Win %
Australian Open	SF	SF	F	SF	F	SF	SF	SF	SF	F	QF	A	QF	W	1 / 13	6–12	33%
French Open	SF	F	F	SF	SF	SF	W	F	SF	F	F	SF	SF		1 / 13	10–11	48%
Wimbledon	A	A	W	SF	SF	SF	SF	NH	SF	W	SF	QF	A	F	2 / 9	7–7	50%
US Open	F	SF	SF	NH	SF	SF	F	SF	F	QF	QF	NH	W		1 / 11	3–10	23%
Win–loss	1–3	1–3	4–3	0–3	1–4	0–4	3–3	1–3	1–4	5–3	3–4	2–1	0–1	3–0	3 / 42	22–39	36%

==== Grand Slam finals ====
===== Wheelchair singles: 14 finals (5 titles, 9 runner-ups) =====
Result	Year	Tournament	Surface	Opponent	Score
Loss	2014	Australian Open	Hard	(Japan) Shingo Kunieda	0–6, 1–6
Loss	2014	US Open	Hard	(Japan) Shingo Kunieda	6–7, 4–6
Win	2016	French Open	Clay	(United Kingdom) Gordon Reid	7–6^{(7–1)}, 6–1
Win	2017	Australian Open	Hard	(France) Nicolas Peifer	3–6, 6–2, 6–0
Loss	2017	French Open	Clay	(United Kingdom) Alfie Hewett	6–0, 6–7^{(9–11)}, 2–6
Loss	2017	Wimbledon	Grass	(Sweden) Stefan Olsson	5−7, 6−3, 5−7
Loss	2018	French Open	Clay	(Japan) Shingo Kunieda	6–7, 0–6
Loss	2018	Wimbledon	Grass	(Sweden) Stefan Olsson	2–6, 6–0, 3–6
Win	2019	Australian Open (2)	Hard	(Sweden) Stefan Olsson	7–5, 6–3
Win	2019	French Open (2)	Clay	(United Kingdom) Gordon Reid	6–1, 6–3
Win	2019	Wimbledon	Grass	(Japan) Shingo Kunieda	4–6, 6–3, 6–2
Loss	2022	French Open	Clay	(Japan) Shingo Kunieda	2–6, 7–5, 5–7
Loss	2024	French Open	Clay	(Japan) Tokito Oda	5–7, 3–6
Loss	2025	US Open	Hard	(Japan) Tokito Oda	3–6, 6–3, 6–7^{(11–13)}

== See also ==
- List of Wimbledon champions
- List of Australian Open champions

Awards
Preceded by Gordon Reid	ITF Wheelchair Tennis World Champion; 2017	Succeeded by Shingo Kunieda
