= Stephen Welch =

American wheelchair tennis player

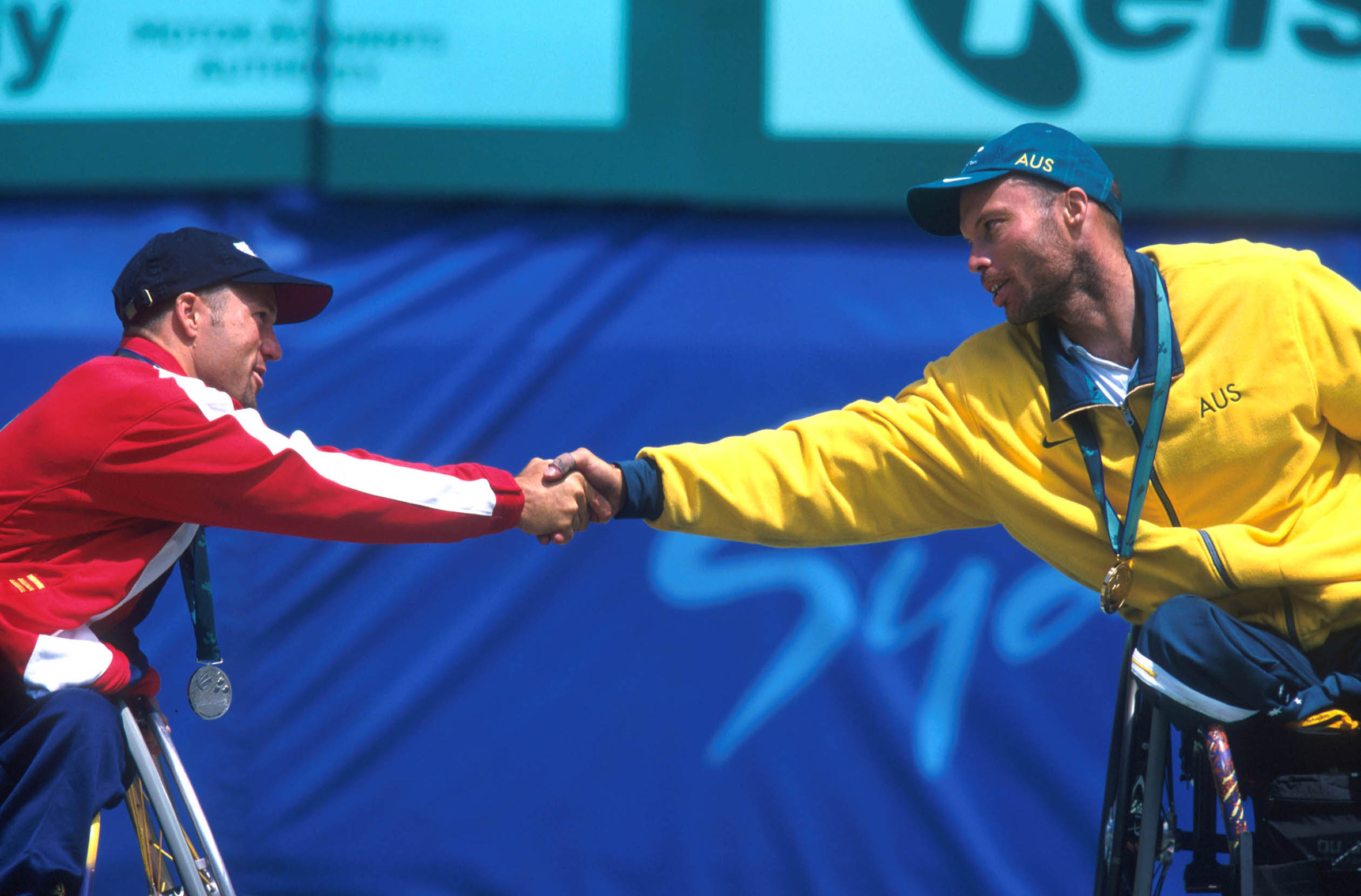
- Welch (right) shaking hands with David Hall

Personal information
- Nationality: United States
- Born: July 28, 1972 (age 53) Fort Worth, Texas, U.S.
- Height: 5 ft 6 in (1.68 m)

Sport
- Coached by: Dan James
Medal record
Men's wheelchair tennis
Representing United States
Paralympic Games
Gold medal – first place	1996 Atlanta	Men's doubles
Silver medal – second place	1996 Atlanta	Men's singles
Silver medal – second place	2000 Sydney	Men's singles
Bronze medal – third place	2000 Sydney	Men's doubles
Parapan American Games
Gold medal – first place	2011 Guadalajara	Men's doubles
Bronze medal – third place	2011 Guadalajara	Men's singles

Stephen Welch (born July 28, 1972) is an American wheelchair tennis player.

== Biography ==
Welch was born in Fort Worth, Texas. Since he was four-years-old he was into a competition. By the age of eight he was diagnosed with Legg–Calvé–Perthes syndrome. He won 100 major titles since 1992, which includes three U.S. Open titles. He also won 5 National championships in the National Wheelchair Basketball Association and also three MVP awards. He attended Paralympic games starting from 1996, but only won one silver medal for singles and one silver for doubles in the 1996 Summer Paralympics and won gold for singles and another bronze for doubles at the Sydney Paralympic Games. He also participated at the 2011 Parapan American Games where he won gold medal for doubles and a bronze one for singles. In 1996 and 2000 he played wheelchair basketball for the Olympics but didn't get any medals for it. In 2001 Steve challenged radio jockey Howard Stern to a tennis match. They played at the Crosstown Tennis at Fifth Ave in New York City in a single set match where Steve defeated Howard Stern 6–0.
