= Ecuador at the 2011 Parapan American Games =

Sporting event delegation

Ecuador will participate in the 2011 Parapan American Games.

== Athletics ==
Ecuador will send three male athletes to compete.

== Swimming ==
Ecuador will send one female swimmer to compete.

== Table tennis ==
Ecuador will send one male table tennis player to compete.

== Wheelchair tennis ==
Ecuador will send two male athletes to compete.

== See also ==
- Ecuador at the 2011 Pan American Games
- Ecuador at the 2012 Summer Paralympics
