= Natália Mayara =

Brazilian wheelchair tennis player

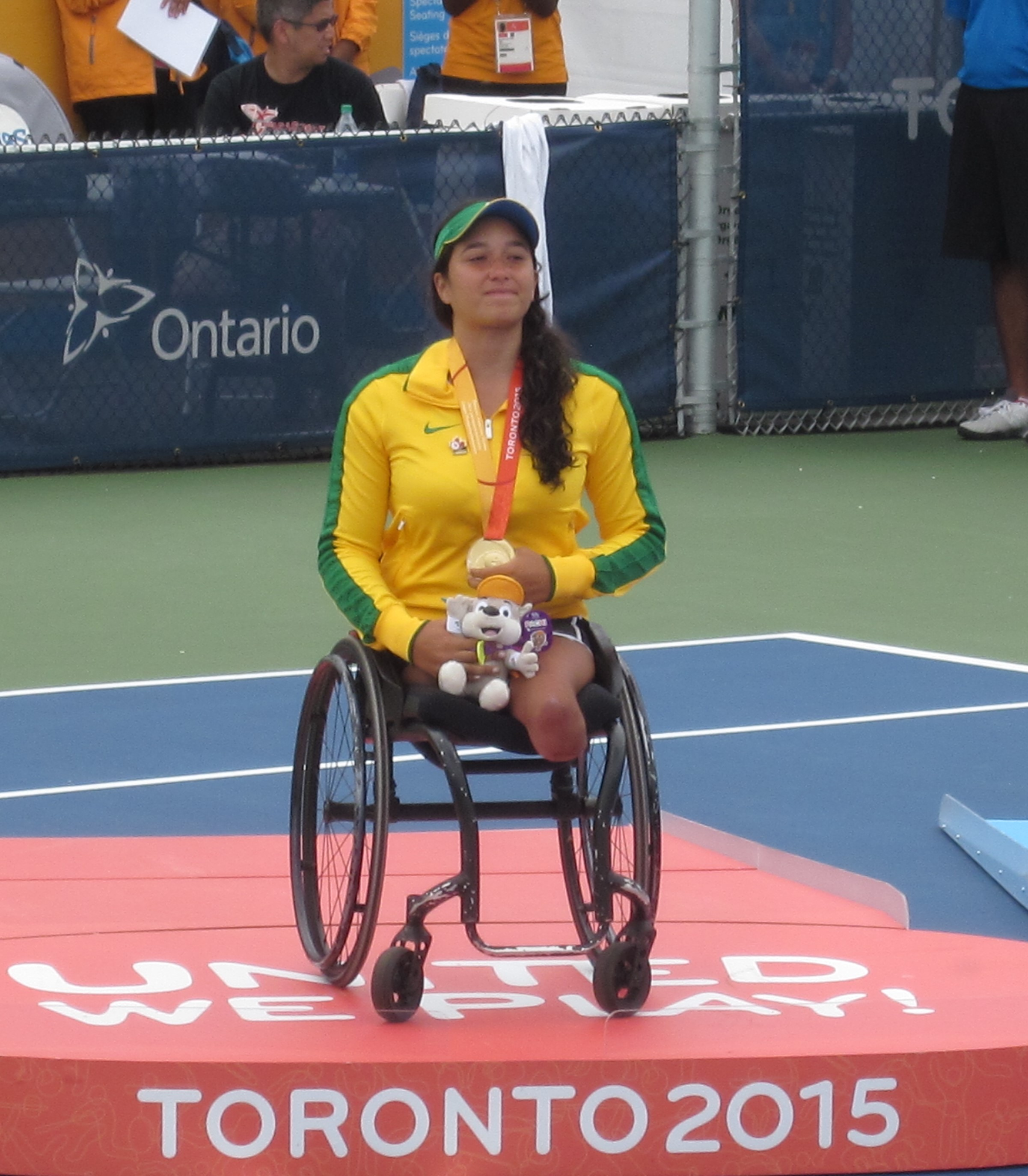
- Full name: Natália Mayara Azevedo da Costa
- Country (sports): Brazil
- Residence: São Paulo, Brazil
- Born: 3 April 1994 (age 32) Recife, Brazil
- Height: 1.32 m (4 ft 4 in)
- Plays: Right-handed (one-handed backhand)

Singles
- Career titles: 29
- Highest ranking: No. 13 (31 July 2017)

Other tournaments
- Paralympic Games: 2R (2016)

Doubles
- Career titles: 28
- Highest ranking: No. 14 (2 July 2018)

Other doubles tournaments
- Paralympic Games: 1R (2016)
Medal record
Parapan American Games
Gold medal – first place	2015 Toronto	Women's singles
Gold medal – first place	2015 Toronto	Women's doubles

Natália Mayara Azevedo da Costa (born 3 April 1994) is a former Brazilian wheelchair tennis player who competed in international level events. She is a double gold medalist at the 2015 Parapan American Games and competed at the Paralympic Games twice.

Mayara lost her legs after she was hit by a bus that went onto a sidewalk. She began playing tennis and swimming aged eleven and she pursued a career in wheelchair tennis when she participated at a youth world championship as a junior tennis player in 2011.
