= Mary Kaiser =

American chemist

Mary Agnes Kaiser (June 11, 1948 – July 10, 2011) was an American chemist. She worked at E. I. DuPont de Nemours and Company, where she was the first woman promoted to senior research fellow. A woman scientist of distinction, she was internationally known for her work in environmental analytical chemistry.

== Early life and education ==
Kaiser was born in Pittston, Pennsylvania, on June 11, 1948, to Fredolin Kaiser and Agnes Regina Searfoss Kaiser and grew up in Exeter, Pennsylvania. She attended Wilkes College and obtained the bachelor's degree in chemistry in 1970. She received her master's degree from Saint Joseph's University in 1972, and a PhD in analytical chemistry from Villanova University in 1976. Subsequently, she spent a year as a Graham Perdue Fellow at the University of Georgia, where she worked with Professor Lockhart Burgess (Buck) Rogers.

== Career and research ==
In 1977, Kaiser began working the DuPont Company, where she was the first woman to be promoted to the level of senior research fellow. She worked as a supervisor in the Separations Department DuPont's Central Research and Development Department in Wilmington, Delaware. Kaiser was an active member of the American Chemical Society, the Chromatography Forum of the Delaware Valley, the Eastern Analytical Symposium, and the Federation of Analytical Chemistry and Spectroscopy Societies. In 1985, she was the second woman ever elected chair of the American Chemical Society's Division of Analytical Chemistry, and the first in the modern era. She is the only person to have served as the president of the Eastern Analytical Symposium and as chair of the governing board of the Federation of Analytical Chemistry and Spectroscopy Societies. For her work in environmental chemistry at the DuPont Company, she became internationally known for the analysis of fluorine compounds in the environment.

== Publications ==
Aside from journal articles on various aspects of environmental analytical chemistry, in 1982, Kaiser and Robert L. Grob published Environmental Problem Solving Using Gas and Liquid Chromatography. The book became a best-seller within the field.

== Personal life ==
Kaiser was married to Professor Cecil R. Dybowski on May 12, 1979, at Villanova Chapel at Villanova University. They had a daughter, Marta M. Dybowski, Esquire. Kaiser died on July 10, 2011, in Newark, Delaware, of the effects of metastatic breast cancer.

== Awards ==
- 2009, ACS Delaware Section Award for "conspicuous scientific achievement"
- 2004, Award for distinguished service in the advancement of analytical chemistry, ACS Division of Analytical Chemistry
- Villanova University Founders Award
- Chromatography Forum of the Delaware Valley Award
