= Chile at the 2011 Parapan American Games =

Sporting event delegation

- IOC code: CHI
- NOC: Comité Paralímpico Chile
- Website: www.paralimpico.cl

in ?
- Medals: Gold 1 Silver 0 Bronze 3 Total 4

Parapan American Games appearances
- 1999; 2003; 2007; 2011; 2015; 2019; 2023

Chile participated in the 2011 Parapan American Games.

== Medalists ==
Medal	Name	Sport	Event	Date
Gold	Cristián Dettoni	Table tennis	Men's singles C7	November 15
Bronze	Juan Carlos Garrido	Powerlifting	Men's 60 kg - 67.5 kg	November 17
Bronze	Cristián Dettoni; Ruperto Morales; Juan Sepúlveda	Table tennis	Men's team C6-8	November 18
Bronze	Francisca Mardones; Maria Antonieta Ortiz	Wheelchair tennis	Women's doubles	November 18

== Athletics ==
Chile sent two male and one female athlete to compete.

== Powerlifting ==
Chile sent two male athletes to compete.

== Swimming ==
Chile sent one male and one female swimmer to compete.

== Table tennis ==
Chile sent seven male table tennis players to compete.

== Wheelchair tennis ==
Chile sent two male and two female athletes to compete.

Athlete	Event	Rank
Robinson Méndez	Men's Singles	4th
Christian Aranda	Men's Singles	L16
Francisca Mardones	Women's Singles	4th
Maria Antonieta Ortiz	Women's Singles	QF
Robinson Méndez; Christian Aranda	Men's Doubles	QF
Francisca Mardones; Maria Antonieta Ortiz	Women's Doubles	Bronze

== See also ==
- Chile at the 2011 Pan American Games
- Chile at the 2012 Summer Paralympics
