= Petar Jelenić =

Croatian tennis player

- Country (sports): Croatia
- Residence: Split, Croatia
- Born: 13 June 1987 (age 37); Split, SR Croatia, SFR Yugoslavia
- Height: 1.90 m (6 ft 3 in)
- Plays: Right-handed (two-handed backhand)
- Prize money: US$30,105

Singles
- Career record: 1–1 (at ATP Tour level, Grand Slam level, and in Davis Cup)
- Career titles: 0
- Highest ranking: No. 467 (8 February 2010)

Doubles
- Career record: 0–0 (at ATP Tour level, Grand Slam level, and in Davis Cup)
- Career titles: 0
- Highest ranking: No. 579 (26 February 2007)

Petar Jelenić (born 13 June 1987) is a retired Croatian tennis player. On 8 February 2010 he reached his highest ATP singles ranking of 467.

He made his only appearance on the ATP main tour as a wildcard at the 2010 PBZ Zagreb Indoors, losing in the second round to Michael Berrer. He was also number 7 (27/06/2005) in World Junior Rankings under 18.
