= Kaitlyn Verfuerth =

American wheelchair tennis player and paracanoeist

Kaitlyn Verfeurth
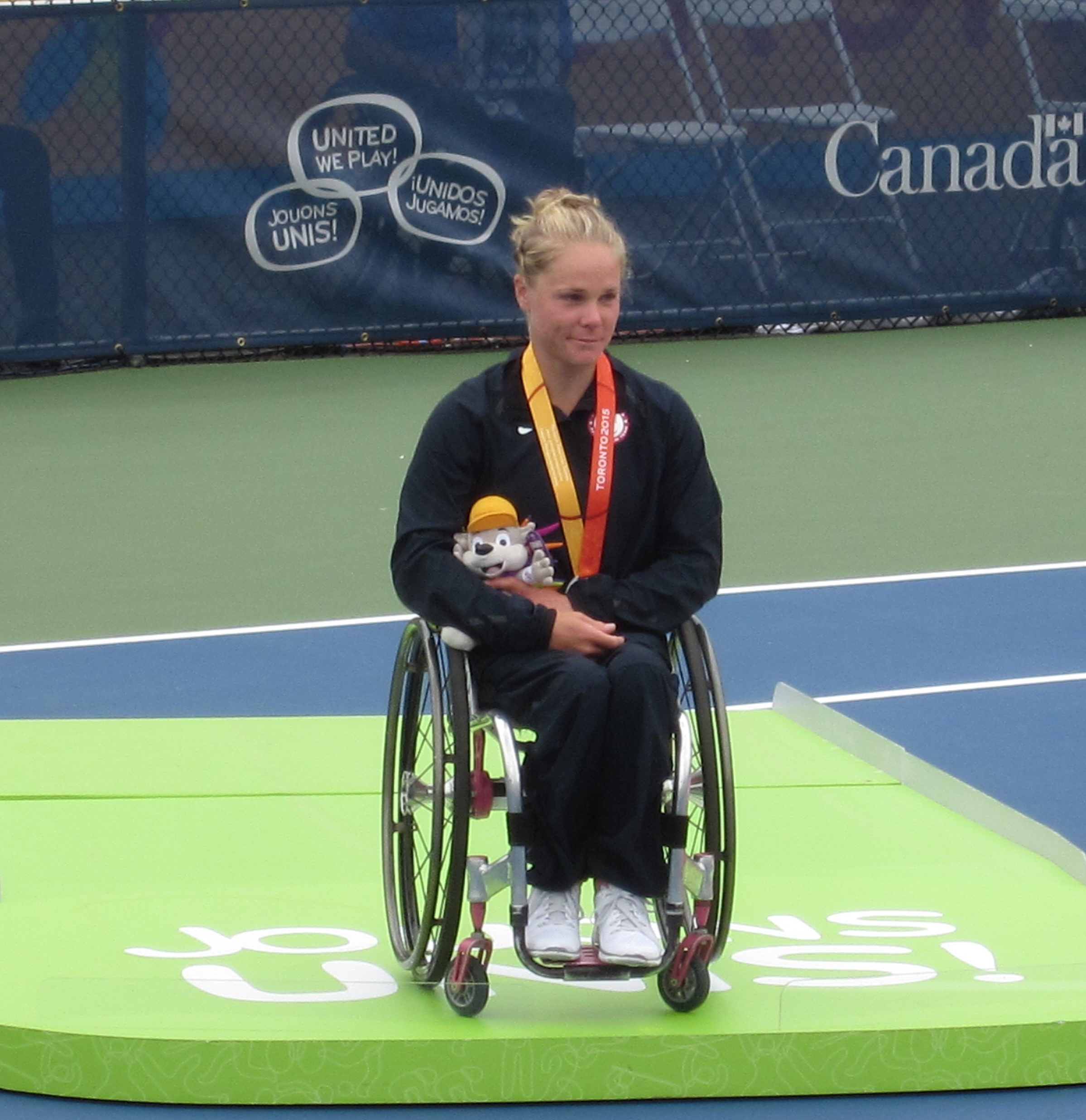
- Full name: Kaitlyn Louise Verfeurth
- Country (sports): United States
- Residence: Flagstaff, Arizona, United States
- Born: 12 August 1985 (age 40) Port Washington, Wisconsin, United States
- Height: 4 ft 11 in (150 cm)
- Turned pro: 2000
- Retired: 2019
- Plays: Right-handed (one-handed backhand)
- College: Mount San Antonio College; University of Arizona

Singles
- Highest ranking: No. 10 (20 April 2009)

Grand Slam singles results
- Australian Open: 2R (2008)
- US Open: QF (2015)

Other tournaments
- Masters: SF (2005)
- Paralympic Games: 2R (2004, 2008)

Doubles
- Highest ranking: No. 10 (21 July 2008)

Grand Slam doubles results
- Australian Open: QF (2008)
- US Open: SF (2015)

Other doubles tournaments
- Masters Doubles: SF (2005, 2006)
- Paralympic Games: SF – 4th (2008)
Medal record
Parapan American Games
Gold medal – first place	2007 Rio de Janeiro	Women's doubles
Gold medal – first place	2007 Rio de Janeiro	Women's singles
Silver medal – second place	2015 Toronto	Women's singles
Bronze medal – third place	2015 Toronto	Women's doubles

Kaitlyn Louise Verfeurth (born 12 August 1985) is a paracanoe athlete. She is a former American wheelchair tennis player who competed in international level events.

Verfuerth sustained an L2 incomplete spinal cord injury aged seven when she was involved in a car accident in 1993. She spent 96 days hospitalised in Froedtert Hospital in Milwaukee and then two months of bed rest.

Verfuerth competed in wheelchair tennis at the 2004, 2008 and 2016 Paralympic Games. She retired after 2016 Paralympic Games due to the travel demand for tennis players. However, she picked up paracanoe in 2017 after meeting United States' paracanoe coach during the 2016 Games. She also competed in paracanoe in the 2020 Summer Paralympics in kayak KL2 and va'a VL2.
