= Francisca Mardones (parathlete) =

Chilean Paralympic athlete

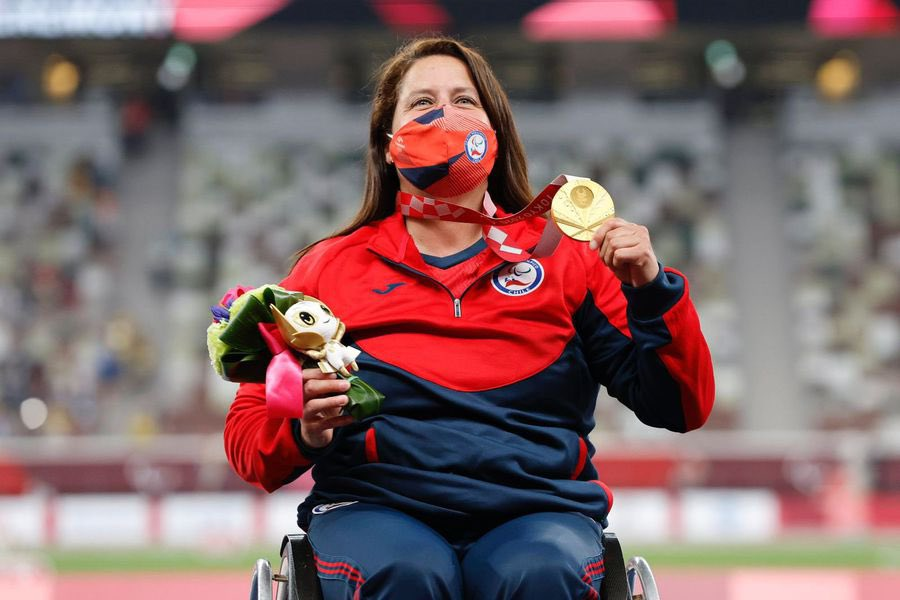
- At the 2020 Summer Paralympics
- Full name: Francisca Mardones Sepúlveda
- Country (sports): Chile
- Residence: Santiago, Chile
- Born: 24 September 1977 (age 48)
- Retired: 2017
- Official website: franciscamardones.com

Singles
- Highest ranking: No. 27

Other tournaments
- Paralympic Games: 2nd round (2012)

Other doubles tournaments
- Paralympic Games: Quarter finals (2016)
Medal record
Representing Chile
Women's athletics
Paralympic Games
Gold medal – first place	2020 Tokyo	Shot put 54
Parapan American Games
Silver medal – second place	2019 Lima	Shot put F53/54/55
Bronze medal – third place	2019 Lima	Javelin throw 54
Women's wheelchair tennis
Parapan American Games
Bronze medal – third place	2011 Guadalajara	Doubles

Francisca Mardones (born 24 September 1977) is a Chilean Paralympic athlete and former wheelchair tennis player. She has competed at both the 2012 and 2016 Summer Paralympics in tennis, before retiring in 2017 to concentrate on athletics. She broke her own world record in the F54 Women's shot put event at the 2020 Summer Paralympics. Mardones is part of the LGBTQ+ community.

== Career ==
As a child, Mardones aspired to compete in sports and represent Chile at the Olympic Games. She pursued studies in hotel management and eventually managed cabins in Culebra, Puerto Rico. In 1999, Hurricane Lenny struck the resort. While ensuring her guests reached a shelter, she was hit by a landslide, falling into a ravine. Unable to move for several minutes, she crawled to a nearby shelter, where she was discovered two days later. The fall damaged her spine, necessitating the use of a wheelchair. After several operations and four years of recovery, she learned to walk short distances with a cane, albeit in pain.

Following her injury, Mardones embraced wheelchair tennis, playing for Chile and teaching the sport. Mardones had started at the Grey Rock Tennis Club in Austin, Texas, learning there about her selection for the Chilean team. Financially supported by sponsorships, she occasionally dipped into savings for World Championship travel. She competed in the Parapan American Games, winning bronze in 2007 (Rio de Janeiro) and 2011 (Guadalajara). Representing Chile, she participated in the 2012 Summer Paralympics in London and the 2016 Games in Rio de Janeiro. Her achievements garnered awards, including recognition for inspiring others and a Golden Condor for the best Paralympic Tennis performance in 2014.

In 2017, Mardones suffered further injury, cutting her right hand in the kitchen, causing nerve damage. Attempting field athletics to reduce travel, she feared the injury's impact on wheelchair performance but not on javelin, discus, or shot put. Consequently, she retired from tennis, focusing solely on athletics.

In 2019, Mardones participated in the Parapan American Games in Lima, where she won a silver medal and set a record in her category. That same year, she competed in the World Para Athletics Championships in Dubai in the shot put and javelin disciplines. She learned, just hours before her debut, about the death of her father in Chile but decided not to withdraw from the championship in his honor. In shot put, she won the gold medal and broke the world record with a mark of 8.19 meters in the F54 class. The Paralympic Committee of the Americas proclaimed Mardones as the "best athlete of the month of November" in 2019.

In 2021, Mardones achieved gold in the discus throw final at the Tunisia Grand Prix with a record of 17.50 meters.

On 30 August 2021, Mardones won the gold medal in the F54 shot put at the Tokyo 2020 Paralympic Games. With a throw of 8.33 meters, she set a new world record, breaking her own record from 2019. In her 6 throws, she broke the world record of 8.19 meters twice, first in her third throw with 8.21 meters and finally in her last throw with 8.33 meters. While she was considered to participate in the javelin throw at the Paralympic Games, she decided not to do so due to physical discomfort and the recommendation of specialists.

On 30 August 2024, Mardones competed in women's shot put F54 at the 2024 Summer Paralympics in Paris, France.
