= United States at the 2011 Parapan American Games =

Sporting event delegation

The United States participated in the 2011 Parapan American Games.

== Medalists ==
Medals by sport
Sport	1st place, gold medalist(s)	2nd place, silver medalist(s)	3rd place, bronze medalist(s)	Total
Athletics	25	15	16	56
Cycling	9	11	4	24
Swimming	8	11	5	24
Wheelchair tennis	3	1	1	5
Wheelchair basketball	2	0	0	2
Table tennis	1	4	1	6
Archery	1	2	3	6
Judo	1	1	2	4
Goalball	1	1	0	2
Sitting volleyball	0	1	0	1
Powerlifting	0	0	2	2
Total	51	47	34	132

Medal	Name	Sport	Event	Date
Gold	Oscar Sanchez	Cycling	Mixed time trial H1-4	November 13
Gold	Steven Peace	Cycling	Mixed time trial T1-2	November 13
Gold	Amanda Everlove	Swimming	Women's 100 metre butterfly S9	November 13
Gold	Anna Johannes	Swimming	Women's 100 metre butterfly S9	November 13
Gold	Jarryd Wallace	Athletics	Men's 100 metres T44	November 14
Gold	Erik Hightower	Athletics	Men's 100 metres T54	November 14
Gold	Scott Winkler	Athletics	Men's shot put F54/55/56	November 14
Gold	David Prince	Athletics	Men's 400 metres T44	November 14
Gold	Amberlynn Weber	Athletics	Women's 400 metres T54	November 14
Gold	Raymond Martin	Athletics	Men's 800 metres T52	November 14
Gold	Amberlynn Weber	Athletics	Women's 800 metres T54	November 14
Gold	Reilly Boyt	Swimming	Women's 100 metre breaststroke SB6	November 14
Gold	Anna Johannes	Swimming	Women's 100 metre breaststroke SB6	November 14
Gold	Haley Beranbaum	Swimming	Women's 200 metre individual medley SM5	November 14
Gold	Chelsea McClammer	Athletics	Women's 5000 metres T54	November 15
Gold	Zena Cole	Athletics	Women's discus throw F51/52/53	November 15
Gold	Jennifer Schuble	Cycling	Women's 500 metres time trial C1-5	November 15
Gold	Tahl Leibovitz	Table tennis	Men's singles C9	November 15
Gold	Tanner Gers	Athletics	Men's long jump F11	November 16
Gold	Chelsea McClammer	Athletics	Women's 100 metres T53	November 16
Gold	Amberlynn Weber	Athletics	Women's 200 metres T54	November 16
Gold	Sam Craven	Athletics	Men's shot put F32/33/34	November 16
Gold	Chris Hammer	Athletics	Men's 1,500 metres T46	November 16
Gold	Tommy Chasanoff	Athletics	Men's 800 metres T36	November 16
Gold	Allison Jones	Cycling	Women's individual track pursuit C1-3	November 16
Gold	Jennifer A. Schuble	Cycling	Women's individual track pursuit C4-5	November 16
Gold	Clark Richard Rachfal; David Lee Swanson	Cycling	Men's 1,000 metres track time trial B	November 16
Gold	Anna Johannes	Swimming	Women's 400 metres freestyle S9	November 16
Gold	Eileen Mary Ford	Archery	Women's individual recurve W2/ST	November 17
Gold	Kristen Messer	Athletics	Women's 100 metres T34	November 17
Gold	Chelsea McClammer	Athletics	Women's 200 metres T53	November 17
Gold	Matthew Brown	Athletics	Men's discus throw F42	November 17
Gold	Mackenzie Soldan	Wheelchair tennis	Women's singles	November 17
Gold	Jon Rydberg; Stephen Welch	Wheelchair tennis	Men's doubles	November 17
Gold	Sabra Hawkes	Athletics	Women's 100 metres T37	November 18
Gold	Shaquille Vance	Athletics	Men's 100 metres T42	November 18
Gold	David Prince	Athletics	Men's 200 metres T44	November 18
Gold	Raymond Martin	Athletics	Men's 200 metres T52	November 18
Gold	Tommy Chasanoff	Athletics	Men's 400 metres T36	November 18
Gold	Chelsea McClammer	Athletics	Women's 400 metres T53	November 18
Gold	Chelsea McClammer	Athletics	Women's 1,500 metres T54	November 18
Gold	Myles Porter	Judo	Men's 100 kg	November 18
Gold	Anna Johannes	Swimming	Women's 100 metres backstroke S9	November 18
Gold	Mary Kaiser; Mackenzie Soldan	Wheelchair tennis	Women's doubles	November 18
Gold	Monica Bascio	Cycling	Women's road race H3-4	November 19
Gold	Greta Neimanas	Cycling	Women's road race C1-3	November 19
Gold	Oscar Sanchez	Cycling	Men's road race H2-4	November 19
Gold	Team USA	Goalball	Women	November 19
Gold	Anna Johannes	Swimming	Women's 100 metres freestyle S9	November 19
Gold	Team USA	Wheelchair basketball	Men	November 19
Gold	Team USA	Wheelchair basketball	Women	November 19
Silver	Karissa Whitsell; Lisa Turnbull	Cycling	Mixed road time trial B	November 13
Silver	Matthew Updike	Cycling	Mixed road time trial H1-4	November 13
Silver	Tommy Chasanoff	Athletics	Men's 100 metres T36	November 14
Silver	Blake Leeper	Athletics	Men's 100 metres T44	November 14
Silver	Scott Severn	Athletics	Men's discus throw F51/52/53	November 14
Silver	Gianfranco Iannotta	Athletics	Men's 800 metres T52	November 14
Silver	Zach Abbott	Athletics	Men's 800 metres T53	November 14
Silver	Amanda Everlove	Swimming	Women's 100 metre breaststroke SB8	November 14
Silver	Reilly Boyt	Swimming	Women's 200 metre individual medley SB8	November 14
Silver	Raymond Martin	Athletics	Men's 100 metres T52	November 15
Silver	Karissa Whitsell; Lisa Turnbull	Cycling	Women's individual pursuit B	November 15
Silver	Vincent Juarez	Cycling	Men's 1000 metres time trial C1-5	November 15
Silver	Greta Neimanas	Cycling	Women's 500 metres time trial C1-5	November 15
Silver	Anna Johannes	Swimming	Women's 50 metre freestyle S9	November 15
Silver	Casey Johnson	Swimming	Women's 50 metre butterfly S6	November 15
Silver	Pamela Fontaine	Table tennis	Women's singles C1-3	November 15
Silver	Andre Scott	Table tennis	Men's singles C5	November 15
Silver	Angela Madsen	Athletics	Women's shot put F54/55/56	November 16
Silver	Dennis Ogbe	Athletics	Men's discus throw F57/58	November 16
Silver	Greta Neimanas	Cycling	Women's individual track pursuit C4-5	November 16
Silver	Karissa Whitsell; Lisa Turnbull	Cycling	Women's 1,000 metres track time trial B	November 16
Silver	Daniel Kamber	Swimming	Men's 50 metres freestyle S7	November 16
Silver	Jessica Rogers	Swimming	Women's 100 metres breaststroke SB4	November 16
Silver	Michael Oris Lukow	Archery	Men's individual recurve W2/ST	November 17
Silver	Natalie Lynn Wells	Archery	Women's individual recurve W2/ST	November 17
Silver	Carleigh Dewald	Athletics	Women's 100 metres T34	November 17
Silver	Tommy Chasanoff	Athletics	Men's 200 metres T36	November 17
Silver	Raymond Martin	Athletics	Men's 400 metres T52	November 17
Silver	Alyssa Gialamas	Swimming	Women's 50 metres freestyle S5	November 17
Silver	Mary Elizabeth Kaiser	Wheelchair tennis	Women's singles	November 17
Silver	Rudy Garcia-Tolson	Athletics	Men's 100 metres T42	November 18
Silver	Erik Hightower	Athletics	Men's 200 metres T54	November 18
Silver	Scot Severn	Athletics	Men's shot put F52/53	November 18
Silver	Sam Craven	Athletics	Men's discus throw F32/33/34	November 18
Silver	Katie Lee Davis	Judo	Women's +70 kg	November 18
Silver	Team USA	Sitting volleyball	Men	November 18
Silver	Alyssa Gialamas	Swimming	Women's 100 metres freestyle S5	November 18
Silver	Daniel Kamber	Swimming	Men's 50 metres butterfly S7	November 18
Silver	Alyssa Gialamas	Swimming	Women's 50 metres backstroke S5	November 18
Silver	Pamela Fontaine; Tara Profitt	Table tennis	Women's team C1-3	November 18
Silver	Tahl Leibovitz; Wayne K. Lo	Table tennis	Men's team C9-10	November 18
Silver	Karissa Whitsell; Lisa Turnbull	Cycling	Women's road race B	November 19
Silver	Michael Farrell	Cycling	Men's road race C1-3	November 19
Silver	Steven Peace	Cycling	Mixed road race T1-2	November 19
Silver	Matthew Updike	Cycling	Men's road race H2-4	November 19
Silver	Team USA	Goalball	Men	November 19
Silver	Alyssa Gialamas	Swimming	Women's 200 metres freestyle S5	November 19
Bronze	Chelsea McClammer	Athletics	Women's 800 metres T54	November 14
Bronze	Tharon Drake	Swimming	Men's 50 metre freestyle S11	November 14
Bronze	Brandon Pelletier	Athletics	Men's 100 metres T46	November 15
Bronze	Gianfranco Iannotta	Athletics	Men's 100 metres T52	November 15
Bronze	Zach Abbott	Athletics	Men's 100 metres 53	November 15
Bronze	Julie Crisp	Athletics	Women's javelin throw F37/38	November 15
Bronze	Clark Rachfal; David Swanson	Cycling	Men's individual pursuit B	November 15
Bronze	Allison Jones	Cycling	Women's 500 metres time trial C1-5	November 15
Bronze	Michelle Fischer	Swimming	Women's 50 metre freestyle S6	November 15
Bronze	Haley Beranbaum	Swimming	Women's 50 metre butterfly S5	November 15
Bronze	Erik Hightower	Athletics	Men's 400 metres T54	November 16
Bronze	Michael Murray	Athletics	Men's 1,500 metres T20	November 16
Bronze	Scott Winkler	Athletics	Men's discus throw F54/55/56	November 16
Bronze	Michael L. Farrell	Cycling	Men's individual track pursuit C1-3	November 16
Bronze	Kayla Wheeler	Swimming	Women's 50 metres breaststroke SB2	November 16
Bronze	Lewis Dugan Denton	Archery	Men's individual compound open	November 17
Bronze	Russell Alan Wolfe	Archery	Men's individual recurve W2/ST	November 17
Bronze	D'arce Raelene Hess	Archery	Women's individual recurve W2/ST	November 17
Bronze	Amberlynn Weber	Athletics	Women's 100 metres T54	November 17
Bronze	Zach Abbott	Athletics	Men's 200 metres T53	November 17
Bronze	Catherine Callahan	Athletics	Women's discus throw F57/58	November 17
Bronze	Robyn Stawski	Athletics	Women's javelin throw F52/53/33/34	November 17
Bronze	Markeith Price	Athletics	Men's long jump F13	November 18
Bronze	Markeith Price	Athletics	Men's 200 metres T13	November 18
Bronze	Gianfranco Iannotta	Athletics	Men's 200 metres T52	November 18
Bronze	Zach Abbott	Athletics	Men's 400 metres T53	November 18
Bronze	Stuart Caplin; Andre Scott; James Segrest Jr. Emmanuel Siu	Table tennis	Men's team C4-5	November 18
Bronze	Stephen Welch	Wheelchair tennis	Men's singles	November 18
Bronze	Allison Jones	Cycling	Women's road race C1-3	November 19
Bronze	Ahmed Shafik	Powerlifting	Men's 90 kg - +100 kg	November 19
Bronze	Mary Stack	Powerlifting	Women's 67.5 kg - +82.5 kg	November 19
Bronze	Irina Kaplan	Swimming	Women's 100 metres backstroke S6	November 19
Bronze	Ron Hawthorne	Judo	Men's 60 kg	November 20
Bronze	Joshua Farra	Judo	Men's 66 kg	November 20

== Archery ==
The United States sent six male and three female athletes to compete.

== Athletics ==
The United States sent 29 male and 15 female athletes to compete.

== Boccia ==
The United States sent nine male athletes and one female athlete to compete.

Athlete	Event	Round robin				Quarterfinals	Semifinals	Final
Athlete	Event	Match 1	Match 2	Match 3	Match 4	Quarterfinals	Semifinals	Final
Athlete	Event	Opposition Result	Opposition Result	Opposition Result	Opposition Result	Opposition Result	Opposition Result	Opposition Result
Elizabeth Flora-Swick	Individual BC1	Yendez (VEN); W 4–0	Smith-Worthylake (CAN); W 4–2	Ventura (MEX); L 1–10	Richardson (CAN); L 3–4	did not advance		
Timothy Hawker	Individual BC1	Johnson (USA); L 3–7	Alvarez (VEN); W 12–1	Chagas (BRA); L 1–3	Lenon Campos (BRA); W 5–1	Ventura (MEX); L 0–7	did not advance	
Kenneth Johnson	Individual BC1	Hawker (USA); W 7–3	Chagas (BRA); L 1–8	Lenon Campos (BRA); W 5–1	Alvarez (VEN); L 3–4	Ibarbure (ARG); L 2–12	did not advance	
Charles Fleisch	Individual BC3	Dubois (CAN); L 2–5	Rojas (COL); W 4–2	Massardi (BRA); L 1–6		did not advance		
Austin Hanson	Individual BC3	Ebergenyi (MEX); W 7–0	Ruiz (ARG); L 3–5	Aya (COL); L 1–5		Gauthier (COL); L 2–5	did not advance	
Charles Brown	Individual BC4	Villarreal (MEX); L 5–6	Moraes (BRA); L 2–7	Santos (BRA); L 0–12		did not advance		

== Cycling ==
The United States sent seventeen male and thirteen female athletes to compete. Ten male and seven female athletes competed in the road cycling tournament, while seven male and six female athletes competed in the track cycling tournament.

=== Road ===
Men

Event	Athlete	Time	Rank
Road race B	David Swanson; Clark Rachfal	2:01.42	4
Road race C1-3	Michael Farrell	1:24.07	2nd place, silver medalist(s)
Road race C1-3	Brett Weitzel	DNF	–
Road race C1-3	Anthony Zahn	1:33.02	11
Road race C4-5	Vincent Juarez	2:01.00	5
Road race C4-5	Samuel Kavanagh	2:05.18	11
Road race H2-3	Oscar Sanchez	1:08.17	1st place, gold medalist(s)
Road race H2-3	Matthew Updike	1:08.18	2nd place, silver medalist(s)

Women

Event	Athlete	Time	Rank
Road race B	Karissa Whitsell; Lisa Turnbull	1:35.13	2nd place, silver medalist(s)
Road race C1-3	Allison Jones	1:14.29	3rd place, bronze medalist(s)
Road race C1-3	Greta Neimanas	1:07.12	1st place, gold medalist(s)
Road race C1-3	Jamie Schanbaum	2:22.01	5
Road race H3-4	Monica Bascio	1:19.00	1st place, gold medalist(s)

Mixed

Event	Athlete	Time	Rank
Time trial B	Karissa Whitsell; Lisa Turnbull	25:37.49	2nd place, silver medalist(s)
Time trial B	David Swanson; Clark Rachfal	26:28.15	4
Road race C1-3	Anthony Zahn	27:34.90	4
Road race C1-3	Jennifer Schuble	27:43.44	5
Road race C1-3	Allison Jones	28:15.60	8
Road race C1-3	Michael Farrell	28:44.26	10
Road race C1-3	Samuel Kavanagh	28:51.11	12
Road race C1-3	Brett Weitzel	30:48.58	20
Road race C1-3	Vincent Juarez	33:57.67	24
Road race C1-3	Jamie Schanbaum	52:54.10	30
Time trial H1-4	Oscar Sanchez	15:55.96	1st place, gold medalist(s)
Time trial H1-4	Matthew Updike	16:03.42	2nd place, silver medalist(s)
Time trial T1-2	Steven Peace	17:58.24	1st place, gold medalist(s)
Road race T1-2	Steven Peace	44.08	2nd place, silver medalist(s)

=== Track ===
Men

Event	Athlete	Qualifying		Final	
Event	Athlete	Time	Rank	Time	Rank
Time trial B	Clark Rachfal; David Swanson			1:04.470	1st place, gold medalist(s)
Time trial C1-5	Michael Farrell			1:13.331	13
Time trial C1-5	Vincent Juarez			1:09.136	2nd place, silver medalist(s)
Time trial C1-5	Samuel Kavanagh			1:11.186	8
Time trial C1-5	Brett Weitzel			1:17.746	17
Time trial C1-5	Anthony Zahn			1:18.253	18
Individual pursuit B	Clark Rachfal; David Swanson	4:28.166	3 q	4:29.364	3rd place, bronze medalist(s)
Individual pursuit C1-3	Michael Farrell	3:53.294	3 q	–	3rd place, bronze medalist(s)
Individual pursuit C1-3	Brett Weitzel	4:27.315	11	did not advance	
Individual pursuit C1-3	Anthony Zahn	4:28.546	12	did not advance	
Individual pursuit C4-5	Vincent Juarez	4:59.575	5	did not advance	
Individual pursuit C4-5	Samuel Kavanagh	4:55.577	4 q	OVL	4

Women

Event	Athlete	Qualifying		Final	
Event	Athlete	Time	Rank	Time	Rank
Time trial B	Karissa Whitsell; Lisa Turnbull			1:13.648	2nd place, silver medalist(s)
Time trial C1-5	Allison Jones			39.294	3rd place, bronze medalist(s)
Time trial C1-5	Greta Neimanas			39.251	2nd place, silver medalist(s)
Time trial C1-5	Jamie Schanbaum			1:00.025	6
Time trial C1-5	Jennifer Schuble			38.020	1st place, gold medalist(s)
Individual pursuit B	Lisa Turnbull; Karissa Whitsell	3:43.951	2 Q	3:45.678	2nd place, silver medalist(s)
Individual pursuit C1-3	Allison Jones	4:21.550	1 Q	–	1st place, gold medalist(s)
Individual pursuit C1-3	Jamie Schanbaum	6:38.558	3	did not advance	
Individual pursuit C4-5	Greta Neimanas	3:54.020	1 Q	3:55.949	2nd place, silver medalist(s)
Individual pursuit C4-5	Jennifer Schuble	3:54.438	2 Q	3:51.330	1st place, gold medalist(s)

Key:
Q – qualified to gold medal race
q – qualified to bronze medal race
OVL – overlapped

== Goalball ==
The United States sent two teams of six athletes each to compete in the men's and women's tournaments.

Men

Team	Preliminary		Semifinals	Final	Rank
Team	Results	Rank	Semifinals	Final	Rank
Joseph Hamilton; Andrew Jenks; John Kusku; Tyler Merren; Donte Mickens; Daryl Walker	Canada (CAN); D 5–5	3	Canada (CAN); W 11–4	Brazil (BRA); L 3–5	2nd place, silver medalist(s)
Joseph Hamilton; Andrew Jenks; John Kusku; Tyler Merren; Donte Mickens; Daryl Walker	Brazil (BRA); L 4–9	3	Canada (CAN); W 11–4	Brazil (BRA); L 3–5	2nd place, silver medalist(s)
Joseph Hamilton; Andrew Jenks; John Kusku; Tyler Merren; Donte Mickens; Daryl Walker	El Salvador (ESA); W 10–0	3	Canada (CAN); W 11–4	Brazil (BRA); L 3–5	2nd place, silver medalist(s)
Joseph Hamilton; Andrew Jenks; John Kusku; Tyler Merren; Donte Mickens; Daryl Walker	Mexico (MEX); W 10–6	3	Canada (CAN); W 11–4	Brazil (BRA); L 3–5	2nd place, silver medalist(s)
Joseph Hamilton; Andrew Jenks; John Kusku; Tyler Merren; Donte Mickens; Daryl Walker	Argentina (ARG); W 12–7	3	Canada (CAN); W 11–4	Brazil (BRA); L 3–5	2nd place, silver medalist(s)

Women

Team	Preliminary		Semifinals	Final	Rank
Team	Results	Rank	Semifinals	Final	Rank
Jennifer Armbruster; Nicole Buck; Lisa Czechowski; Amanda Dennis; Aysa Miller; Robin Theryoung	Brazil (BRA); W 3–1	1	Mexico (MEX); W 10–2	Brazil (BRA); W 2–0	1st place, gold medalist(s)
Jennifer Armbruster; Nicole Buck; Lisa Czechowski; Amanda Dennis; Aysa Miller; Robin Theryoung	El Salvador (ESA); W 10–0	1	Mexico (MEX); W 10–2	Brazil (BRA); W 2–0	1st place, gold medalist(s)
Jennifer Armbruster; Nicole Buck; Lisa Czechowski; Amanda Dennis; Aysa Miller; Robin Theryoung	Mexico (MEX); W 10–0	1	Mexico (MEX); W 10–2	Brazil (BRA); W 2–0	1st place, gold medalist(s)
Jennifer Armbruster; Nicole Buck; Lisa Czechowski; Amanda Dennis; Aysa Miller; Robin Theryoung	Canada (CAN); W 5–2	1	Mexico (MEX); W 10–2	Brazil (BRA); W 2–0	1st place, gold medalist(s)

== Judo ==
The United States sent seven male and five female athletes to compete.

Men

Athlete	Event	Elimination round	Final
Athlete	Event	Opposition Result	Opposition Result
Ronald Hawthorne	Men's 60 kg		
Joshua Farra	Men's 66 kg		
Adnan Gutic	Men's 73 kg		
Dartanyon Crockett	Men's 81 kg		
Ryan Jones	Men's 90 kg		
Myles Porter	Men's 100 kg		
Demetris Morrow	Men's +100 kg		

Women

Athlete	Event	Elimination round	Final
Athlete	Event	Opposition Result	Opposition Result
Angela Moran	Women's 48 kg		
Cynthia Simon	Women's 52 kg		
Jordan Mouton	Women's 57 kg		
Christella Garcia	Women's 70 kg		
Katie Davis	Women's +70 kg		

== Powerlifting ==
The United States sent three male and three female athletes to compete.

== Sitting volleyball ==
The United States sent a team of ten athletes to compete.

Team	Preliminary		Semifinals	Final	Rank
Team	Results	Rank	Semifinals	Final	Rank
Eric Duda; Roderick Green; Edgardo Laforest; J Dee Marinko; Edward O'Neil; Brent Rasmussen; Daniel Regan; Hugo Storer; James Stuck; Charles Swearingen	Brazil (BRA); W 3–2	1	Colombia (COL); W 3–0	Brazil (BRA); L 1–3	2nd place, silver medalist(s)
Eric Duda; Roderick Green; Edgardo Laforest; J Dee Marinko; Edward O'Neil; Brent Rasmussen; Daniel Regan; Hugo Storer; James Stuck; Charles Swearingen	Mexico (MEX); W 3–0	1	Colombia (COL); W 3–0	Brazil (BRA); L 1–3	2nd place, silver medalist(s)
Eric Duda; Roderick Green; Edgardo Laforest; J Dee Marinko; Edward O'Neil; Brent Rasmussen; Daniel Regan; Hugo Storer; James Stuck; Charles Swearingen	Canada (CAN); W 3–1	1	Colombia (COL); W 3–0	Brazil (BRA); L 1–3	2nd place, silver medalist(s)
Eric Duda; Roderick Green; Edgardo Laforest; J Dee Marinko; Edward O'Neil; Brent Rasmussen; Daniel Regan; Hugo Storer; James Stuck; Charles Swearingen	Costa Rica (CRC); W 3–0	1	Colombia (COL); W 3–0	Brazil (BRA); L 1–3	2nd place, silver medalist(s)
Eric Duda; Roderick Green; Edgardo Laforest; J Dee Marinko; Edward O'Neil; Brent Rasmussen; Daniel Regan; Hugo Storer; James Stuck; Charles Swearingen	Colombia (COL); W 3–0	1	Colombia (COL); W 3–0	Brazil (BRA); L 1–3	2nd place, silver medalist(s)

== Swimming ==
The United States sent five male and eighteen female swimmers to compete.

Men

Event	Athletes	Final	
Event	Athletes	Time	Position
50 metre freestyle S3	Jonathan Heider		
50 metre freestyle S5	Nate Higgins		
50 metre freestyle S7	Daniel Kamber	34.10	2nd place, silver medalist(s)
50 metre freestyle S11	Tharon Drake	30.84	3rd place, bronze medalist(s)
50 metre freestyle S13	Blake Adams		
100 metre freestyle S5	Jonathan Heider		
100 metre freestyle S8	Daniel Kamber		
100 metre freestyle S12	Tharon Drake		
100 metre freestyle S13	Blake Adams		
50 metre backstroke S5	Jonathan Heider		
50 metre backstroke S5	Nate Higgins		
100 metre backstroke S7	Daniel Kamber		
100 metre backstroke S11	Tharon Drake		
50 metre breaststroke SB2	Jonathan Heider	1:40.52	5
50 metre breaststroke SB3	Nate Higgins	1:12.36	5
100 metre breaststroke SB8	Daniel Kamber		
100 metre breaststroke SB11	Tharon Drake	1:25.33	4
50 metre butterfly S5	Jonathan Heider		
50 metre butterfly S5	Nate Higgins		
50 metre butterfly S7	Daniel Kamber		
150 metre individual medley SM3	Jonathan Heider		
200 metre individual medley SM8	Daniel Kamber		
200 metre individual medley SM12	Tharon Drake		

Women

Event	Athletes	Final	
Event	Athletes	Time	Position
50 metre freestyle S12	Taylor Hetrick		
50 metre freestyle S12	Letticia Martinez		
50 metre freestyle S3	Kayla Wheeler		
50 metre freestyle S5	Haley Beranbaum	55.56	9
50 metre freestyle S5	Jaide Childs	57.84	10
50 metre freestyle S5	Alyssa Gialamas	47.89	2nd place, silver medalist(s)
50 metre freestyle S6	Michelle Fischer		
50 metre freestyle S6	Casey Johnson		
50 metre freestyle S6	Joy Stebbins		
50 metre freestyle S9	Amy Chapman		
50 metre freestyle S9	Amanda Everlove		
50 metre freestyle S9	Anna Johannes		
100 metre freestyle S12	Taylor Hetrick		
100 metre freestyle S12	Letticia Martinez		
100 metre freestyle S3	Kayla Wheeler		
100 metre freestyle S5	Haley Beranbaum		
100 metre freestyle S5	Jaide Childs		
100 metre freestyle S5	Alyssa Gialamas		
100 metre freestyle S6	Michelle Fischer	1:30.67	4
100 metre freestyle S6	Casey Johnson	1:35.84	6
100 metre freestyle S6	Joy Stebbins	1:34.10	5
100 metre freestyle S9	Amy Chapman		
100 metre freestyle S9	Amanda Everlove		
100 metre freestyle S9	Anna Johannes		
200 metre freestyle S5	Haley Beranbaum		
200 metre freestyle S5	Alyssa Gialamas		
200 metre freestyle S5	Ryan McLean		
200 metre freestyle S5	Kayla Wheeler		
400 metre freestyle S6	Reilly Boyt		
400 metre freestyle S6	Michelle Fischer		
400 metre freestyle S6	Joy Stebbins		
400 metre freestyle S9	Amy Chapman	6:07.50	7
400 metre freestyle S9	Anna Johannes	5:09.18	1st place, gold medalist(s)
50 metre backstroke S5	Haley Beranbaum		
50 metre backstroke S5	Alyssa Gialamas		
50 metre backstroke S5	Ryan McLean		
100 metre backstroke S6	Michelle Fischer		
100 metre backstroke S6	Casey Johnson		
100 metre backstroke S6	Irina Kaplan		
100 metre backstroke S9	Amy Chapman		
100 metre backstroke S9	Amanda Everlove		
100 metre backstroke S9	Anna Johannes		
50 metre breaststroke SB2	Kayla Wheeler	2:25.49	3rd place, bronze medalist(s)
100 metre breaststroke SB4	Alyssa Gialamas	3:01.14	5
100 metre breaststroke SB4	Ryan McLean	2:58.65	4
100 metre breaststroke SB4	Jessica Rogers	2:28.86	2nd place, silver medalist(s)
100 metre breaststroke SB6	Haley Beranbaum		
100 metre breaststroke SB6	Reilly Boyt		
100 metre breaststroke SB6	Casey Johnson		
100 metre breaststroke SB6	Ileana Rodriguez		
100 metre breaststroke SB6	Joy Stebbins		
100 metre breaststroke SB8	Amy Chapman		
100 metre breaststroke SB8	Amanda Everlove	1:38.09	2nd place, silver medalist(s)
100 metre breaststroke SB8	Anna Johannes	1:27.14 PR	1st place, gold medalist(s)
100 metre breaststroke SB8	Kathryn Vandam		
100 metre breaststroke SB12	Taylor Hetrick		
100 metre breaststroke SB12	Letticia Martinez		
50 metre butterfly S5	Haley Beranbaum		
50 metre butterfly S5	Jaide Childs		
50 metre butterfly S5	Kayla Wheeler		
50 metre butterfly S6	Casey Johnson		
50 metre butterfly S6	Irina Kaplan		
100 metre butterfly S9	Amy Chapman		
100 metre butterfly S9	Amanda Everlove	1:15.80	1st place, gold medalist(s)
100 metre butterfly S9	Anna Johannes	1:15.80	1st place, gold medalist(s)
200 metre individual medley SM5	Haley Beranbaum	4:32.29	1st place, gold medalist(s)
200 metre individual medley SM5	Jessica Rogers		
200 metre individual medley SM6	Reilly Boyt	3:40.34	2nd place, silver medalist(s)
200 metre individual medley SM6	Casey Johnson		
200 metre individual medley SM6	Joy Stebbins		

== Table tennis ==
The United States sent eight male and four female table tennis players to compete.

Men

Athlete	Event	Round robin			Quarterfinals	Semifinals	Final
Athlete	Event	Match 1	Match 2	Match 3	Quarterfinals	Semifinals	Final
Athlete	Event	Opposition Result	Opposition Result	Opposition Result	Opposition Result	Opposition Result	Opposition Result
James Segrest	Men's singles C2	Nuñez (CRC); W 3–0	Pinherio (BRA); L 0–3	Cuenca (CUB); L 1–3	did not advance		
Emmanuel Siu	Men's singles C4	Gomez (VEN); L 0–3	Coronado (MEX); L 0–3	Pessoa (BRA); L 0–3	did not advance		
Stuart Caplin	Men's singles C5	Segatto (BRA); L 0–3	Depergola (ARG); L 0–3		did not advance		
Andre Scott	Men's singles C5	Rodriguez (ARG); W 3–1	Ya (BRA); W 3–1			Depergola (ARG); W 3–2	Segatto (BRA); L 2–3 (silver)
Christopher Puls	Men's singles C7	Castro (MEX); L 1–3	Soares (BRA); L 2–3	Ferro (ARG); L 0–3	did not advance		
Daryl Sterling	Men's singles C7	Araya (CRC); W 3–0	Vargas (COL); W 3–1			Dettoni (CHI); L 1–3	Bronze medal final Ferro (ARG); L 1–3
Wayne Lo	Men's singles C8	Martins (BRA); L 1–3	Morales (CHI); W 3–1		Melo (BRA); L 0–3	did not advance	
Tahl Leibovitz	Men's singles C9	Vazquez (MEX); W 3–0	Selvaggi (ARG); W 3–0	Conceicao (BRA); W 3–0		Pinheiro (BRA); W 3–1	Vazquez (MEX); W 3–0 (gold)
Stuart Caplin; Andre Scott; Emmanuel Shiu	Men's team C4-5	Argentina (ARG); L 1–3	Chile (CHI); W 3–1			Brazil (BRA); L 0–3	Bronze medal final Mexico (MEX)
Christopher Puls; Daryl Sterling	Men's team C6-8	Brazil (BRA); L 0–3	Argentina (ARG); L 1–3			did not advance	
Tahl Leibovitz; Wayne Lo	Men's team C9-10	Puerto Rico (PUR); W 3–0	Venezuela (VEN); W 3–1			Colombia (COL); W 3–1	Brazil (BRA)

Women

Athlete	Event	Round robin				Quarterfinals	Semifinals	Final
Athlete	Event	Match 1	Match 2	Match 3	Match 4	Quarterfinals	Semifinals	Final
Athlete	Event	Opposition Result	Opposition Result	Opposition Result	Opposition Result	Opposition Result	Opposition Result	Opposition Result
Melissa Middleton	Women's singles C11	Faust (BRA); L 0–3	Colmenares (VEN); L 0–3			did not advance		
Pamela Fontaine	Women's singles C1-3	Carrillo (VEN); W 3–0	Padilla (MEX); W 3–0				Profitt (USA); W 3–0	Silva (CUB); L 2–3 (silver)
Tara Profitt	Women's singles C1-3	Aguilar (PER); W 3–0	Azevedo (BRA); W 3–1	Silva (CUB); L 0–3		Couto (BRA); W 3–1	Fontaine (USA); L 0–3	Bronze medal final Sigala (MEX); L 0–3
Jennifer Johnson	Women's singles C4	Perez (COL); W 3–0	Arenales (MEX); L 2–3	Verdin (MEX); L 0–3	de Oliveira (BRA); L 0–3			Final round robin rank 4
Pamela Fontaine; Tara Profitt	Women's team C1-3	Brazil (BRA); W 3–2	Venezuela (VEN); W 3–1	Mexico (MEX)				

== Wheelchair basketball ==
The United States sent a team of twelve male athletes and a team of eleven female athletes to compete in the men's and women's tournaments.

Men

Team	Preliminary		Quarterfinals	Semifinals	Final	Rank
Team	Results	Rank	Quarterfinals	Semifinals	Final	Rank
Joseph Chambers; Daniel Fik; Andrew Garabino; Nathan Hinze; Trevon Jenifer; Ian Lynch; Jason Nelms; Christopher Okon; Paul Schulte; Matthew Scott; Steven Serio; Joshua Turek	Argentina (ARG); W 73–46	1	El Salvador (ESA); W 86–7	Mexico (MEX); W 76–48	Colombia (COL); W 60–40	1st place, gold medalist(s)
Joseph Chambers; Daniel Fik; Andrew Garabino; Nathan Hinze; Trevon Jenifer; Ian Lynch; Jason Nelms; Christopher Okon; Paul Schulte; Matthew Scott; Steven Serio; Joshua Turek	Guatemala (GUA); W 95–23	1	El Salvador (ESA); W 86–7	Mexico (MEX); W 76–48	Colombia (COL); W 60–40	1st place, gold medalist(s)
Joseph Chambers; Daniel Fik; Andrew Garabino; Nathan Hinze; Trevon Jenifer; Ian Lynch; Jason Nelms; Christopher Okon; Paul Schulte; Matthew Scott; Steven Serio; Joshua Turek	Brazil (BRA); W 80–47	1	El Salvador (ESA); W 86–7	Mexico (MEX); W 76–48	Colombia (COL); W 60–40	1st place, gold medalist(s)

Women

Team	Preliminary		Semifinals	Final	Rank
Team	Results	Rank	Semifinals	Final	Rank
Sarah Binsfeld; Sarah Castle; Jennifer Chew; Rose Hollermann; Darlene Hunter; Mary Milford; Desiree Miller; Rebecca Murray; Alana Nichols; Natalie Schneider; Andrea Woodson-Smith	Peru (PER); W 61–10	1	Brazil (BRA); W 66–32	Canada (CAN); W 69–31	1st place, gold medalist(s)
Sarah Binsfeld; Sarah Castle; Jennifer Chew; Rose Hollermann; Darlene Hunter; Mary Milford; Desiree Miller; Rebecca Murray; Alana Nichols; Natalie Schneider; Andrea Woodson-Smith	Mexico (MEX); W 77–46	1	Brazil (BRA); W 66–32	Canada (CAN); W 69–31	1st place, gold medalist(s)
Sarah Binsfeld; Sarah Castle; Jennifer Chew; Rose Hollermann; Darlene Hunter; Mary Milford; Desiree Miller; Rebecca Murray; Alana Nichols; Natalie Schneider; Andrea Woodson-Smith	Guatemala (GUA); W 68–15	1	Brazil (BRA); W 66–32	Canada (CAN); W 69–31	1st place, gold medalist(s)

== Wheelchair tennis ==
The United States sent two male and two female athletes to compete.

Men

Athlete	Event	Round of 32	Round of 16	Quarterfinals	Semifinals	Final	
Athlete	Event	Opposition Score	Opposition Score	Opposition Score	Opposition Score	Opposition Score	Rank
Jon Rydberg	Men's singles	Alvarez (PER); W 6–0, 6–2	Rodrigues (BRA); W 6–2, 6–2	Fernandez (ARG); L 4–6, 2–6	did not advance		
Stephen Welch	Men's singles		Avila (MEX); W 7–5, 6–3	Pommê (BRA); W 6–2, 7–6	Ledesma (ARG); L 6–7^{(3–7)}, 3–6	Bronze medal final Mendez (CHI); W 6–0, 6–3	3rd place, bronze medalist(s)
Mary Kaiser	Women's singles			Mayara (BRA); W 6–0, 6–1	Bernal (COL); W 6–1, 7–6^{(7–5)}	Soldan (USA); L 6–1, 4–6, 4–6	2nd place, silver medalist(s)
Mackenzie Soldan	Women's singles		Taboada (MEX); W 6–7, 6–4, 6–2	Martínez (COL); W 1–6, 6–0, 6–2	Mardones (CHI); W 7–5, 6–4	Kaiser (USA); W 1–6, 6–4, 6–4	1st place, gold medalist(s)
Jon Rydberg; Stephen Welch	Men's doubles			Bedard (Canada) Dembe (CAN); W 6–4, 6–3	Oquendo (Colombia) Vega (COL); W 6–2, 6–3	Fernandez (Argentina) Ledesma (ARG); W 6–2, 6–3	1st place, gold medalist(s)
Mary Kaiser; Mackenzie Soldan	Women's doubles			Belmont (Mexico) Taboada (MEX); W 6–3, 6–0	Mardones (Chile) Ortiz (CHI); W 6–4, 3–6, 6–4	Bernal (Colombia) Martínez (COL); W 6–3, 6–0	1st place, gold medalist(s)

== See also ==
- United States at the 2011 Pan American Games
- United States at the 2012 Summer Paralympics
