= Lebanon at the 1960 Summer Paralympics =

- Flag of Lebanon
- IPC code: LIB

in Rome
- Competitors: 1 in 2 sports
- Medals Ranked -th: Gold 0 Silver 0 Bronze 0 Total 0

Summer Paralympics appearances (overview)
- 2000; 2004; 2008; 2012; 2016; 2020; 2024

Lebanon competed at the 1960 Summer Paralympics in Rome, Italy. The delegation consisted of one competitor, Nizar Bissat, who competed in archery and in swimming.

== Disability classifications ==
Athletes at the first Paralympics in 1960 were all afflicted by spinal cord injuries and required the use of a wheelchair. This is in contrast to later Paralympics that include events for participants that fit into any of five different disability categories; amputation, either congenital or sustained through injury or illness; cerebral palsy; wheelchair athletes; visual impairment, including blindness; Les autres, any physical disability that does not fall strictly under one of the other categories, for example dwarfism or multiple sclerosis. Each Paralympic sport then has its own classifications, dependent upon the specific physical demands of competition. Events are given a code, made of numbers and letters, describing the type of event and classification of the athletes competing.

== Archery ==
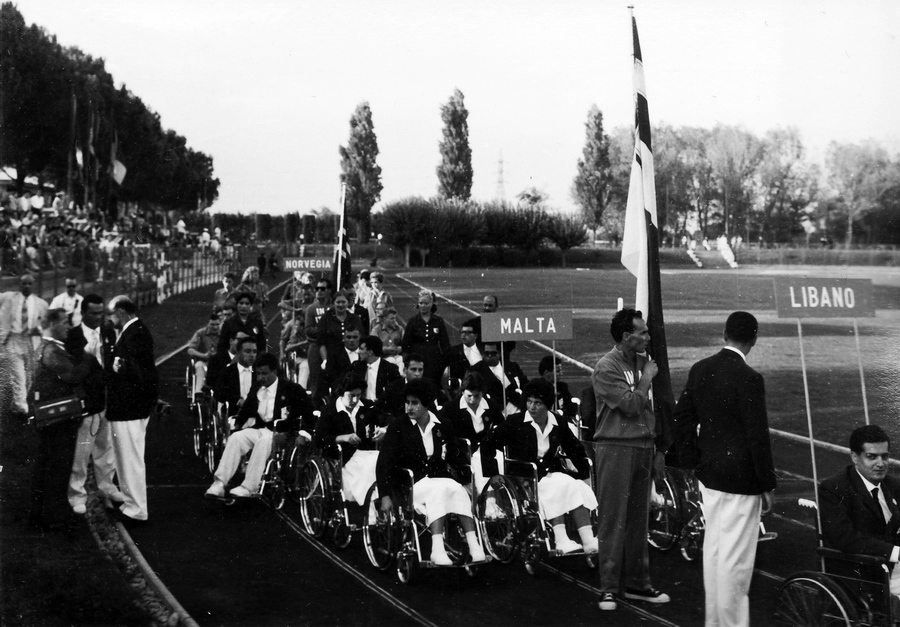
Nizar Bissat (on the right) representing Lebanon at the opening ceremony in Rome 1960

Men

Athlete	Event	Score	Rank
Nizar Bissat	Men's Columbia Round	334	26

Source: IPC

== Swimming ==
Men

Athlete	Event	Final	
Athlete	Event	Time	Rank
Nizar Bissat	Men's 50 m Backstroke C/3	1:21.7	5

Source: IPC

== See also ==
- Lebanon at the 1960 Summer Olympics
- Lebanon at the Paralympics
