= Football 5-a-side at the 2011 Parapan American Games =

- Venue: Pan American Hockey Stadium
- Dates: 15 – 20 November 2011

Football 5-a-side was contested at the 2011 Parapan American Games from November 15 to 20 at the Pan American Hockey Stadium in Guadalajara, Mexico.

== Medal summary ==
=== Medal table ===
Rank	Nation	Gold	Silver	Bronze	Total
1	Brazil	1	0	0	1
2	Argentina	0	1	0	1
3	Colombia	0	0	1	1
Totals (3 entries)		1	1	1	3

=== Medal events ===
Event	Gold	Silver	Bronze
Men	Brazil (BRA); Marcos Alves Felipe; Jeferson da Conceição; Gledson da Paixão; Damião Robson; Cássio Lopes dos Reis; Marcos Pinheiro; Ricardo Steinmetz Alves; Antônio Taffarel; Fábio Vasconcelos	Argentina (ARG); Federico Accardi; Guido Consoni; Angel Deldo; Carlos Figueroa; Dario Lencina; Gustavo Maidana; Froilán Padilla; David Peralta; Luis Sacayan; Silvio Velo	Colombia (COL); Cesar Arévalo; Sergio Becerra; William Correa; Jhon Hernandez; Fredy Lopez; Deyvi Mendoza; Giovany Palacios; Juan Parra; Nicolás Quintero; Sebastian Zarate

== Results ==
=== Preliminary round ===
Team	P	W	D	L	G	GA	GD	Points
Argentina (ARG)	5	4	1	0	16	1	+15	13
Brazil (BRA)	5	4	0	1	23	2	+21	12
Colombia (COL)	5	3	0	2	10	4	+6	9
Mexico (MEX)	5	2	1	2	9	10	–1	7
Uruguay (URU)	5	1	0	4	4	12	–8	3
El Salvador (ESA)	5	0	0	5	0	33	–33	0

15 November
10:00

Mexico	4 – 0	El Salvador
	Report

Pan American Hockey Stadium
15 November
12:00

Brazil	5 – 1	Uruguay
	Report

Pan American Hockey Stadium
15 November
14:00

Argentina	1 – 0	Colombia
	Report

Pan American Hockey Stadium

16 November
10:00

Colombia	2 – 1	Mexico
	Report

Pan American Hockey Stadium
16 November
12:00

Brazil	10 – 0	El Salvador
	Report

Pan American Hockey Stadium
16 November
14:00

Argentina	1 – 0	Uruguay
	Report

Pan American Hockey Stadium

17 November
10:00

Mexico	0 – 6	Brazil
	Report

Pan American Hockey Stadium
17 November
12:00

Uruguay	0 – 3	Colombia
	Report

Pan American Hockey Stadium
17 November
14:00

Argentina	12 – 0	El Salvador
	Report

Pan American Hockey Stadium

18 November
10:00

Mexico	1 – 1	Argentina
	Report

Pan American Hockey Stadium
18 November
12:00

Brazil	2 – 0	Colombia
	Report

Pan American Hockey Stadium
18 November
14:00

Uruguay	2 – 0	El Salvador
	Report

Pan American Hockey Stadium

19 November
10:00

Mexico	3 – 1	Uruguay
	Report

Pan American Hockey Stadium
19 November
12:00

Brazil	0 – 1	Argentina
	Report

Pan American Hockey Stadium
19 November
14:00

Colombia	5 – 0	El Salvador
	Report

Pan American Hockey Stadium

=== Finals ===
==== Fifth place match ====
20 November
10:00

Uruguay	2 – 0	El Salvador
	Report

Pan American Hockey Stadium

==== Bronze medal match ====
20 November
12:00

Colombia	4 – 0	Mexico
	Report

Pan American Hockey Stadium

==== Gold medal match ====
20 November
14:00

Argentina	0 – 1	Brazil
	Report

Pan American Hockey Stadium
