= Albania at the 2012 Summer Paralympics =

- IPC code: ALB
- NPC: Albanian National Paralympic Committee

in London
- Competitors: 1 in 1 sport
- Flag bearer: Haki Doku
- Medals: Gold 0 Silver 0 Bronze 0 Total 0

Summer Paralympics appearances (overview)
- 2012; 2016–2024

Albania competed at the 2012 Summer Paralympics in London, United Kingdom from August 29 to September 9, 2012.

== Cycling ==
=== Road ===
Men

Athlete	Event	Time	Rank
Haki Doku	Road Race H2	LAP	
Haki Doku	Time Trial H2	38:23.73	14

== See also ==
- Albania at the 2012 Summer Olympics
