= André Andrade =

André Andrade may refer to:

- André Andrade (athlete) (born 1980/1), Brazilian paralympic athlete
- André Andrade (footballer) (born 1976), Brazilian footballer

== See also ==
- Andrés Andrade (disambiguation)
