= Wheelchair basketball at the 2011 Parapan American Games =

- Dates: 13 – 19 November 2011

Wheelchair basketball was contested at the 2011 Parapan American Games from November 13 to 19 at the CODE Dome in Guadalajara, Mexico.

== Medal summary ==
=== Medal table ===
Rank	Nation	Gold	Silver	Bronze	Total
1	United States	2	0	0	2
2	Canada	0	1	1	2
3	Colombia	0	1	0	1
4	Brazil	0	0	1	1
Totals (4 entries)		2	2	2	6

=== Medal events ===
Event	Gold	Silver	Bronze
Men	United States (USA); Joseph Garabino; Trevon Jenifer; Daniel Fik; Nathan Hinze; Christopher Okon; Matthew Scott; Joshua Turek; Steven Serio; Jason Nelms; Ian Lynch; Paul Schulte; Joseph Chambers	Colombia (COL); Diego Capacho; Guillermo Alzate; Wilman Rios; Nelson Sanz; Fredy Rodriguez; Jefferson Garces; Jose Leep; Jhon Hernandez; Miguel Chaparro; William Pulido; Daniel Diaz; Rodney Hawkins	Canada (CAN); David Durepos; Yvon Rouillard; Robert Hedges; Tyler Miller; Joey Johnson; Adam Lancia; Abdi Dini; Chad Jassman; Patrick Anderson; Brandon Wagner; Mickael Poulin; David Eng
Women	United States (USA); Rebecca Murray; Darlene Hunter; Jennifer Chew; Andrea Woodson-Smith; Natalie Schneider; Desiree Miller; Sarah Binsfeld; Sarah Castle; Alana Nichols; Mary Milford; Rose Hollermann	Canada (CAN); Elaine Allard; Janet McLachlan; Kendra Ohama; Cindy Ouellet; Maude Jacques; Katie Harnock; Elisha Williams; Tracey Ferguson; Jamey Jewells; Jessica Vliegenthart; Tara Feser	Brazil (BRA); Cleonete Reis; Andreia Farias; Naildes de Jesus; Lucicléia da Costa; Rosália Ramos; Ana Mendes; Débora Guimarães; Monica Andrade; Lia Soares; Cíntia Lopes de Carvalho; Paola Klokler; Vileide Brito

== Men ==
=== Preliminary round ===
==== Group A ====
Team	Pld	W	L	PF	PA	PD	Pts
Canada (CAN)	3	3	0	210	123	+87	6
Mexico (MEX)	3	2	1	203	165	+38	5
Colombia (COL)	3	1	2	165	141	+24	4
El Salvador (ESA)	3	0	3	71	220	–149	3

13 November
15:45

Canada	57–38	Colombia
Scoring by quarter: 16–8, 8–12, 11–9, 22–9

CODE Dome

13 November
20:15

Mexico	82–23	El Salvador
Scoring by quarter: 23–4, 10–6, 21–10, 28–3

CODE Dome

14 November
18:00

El Salvador	28–70	Canada
Scoring by quarter: 2–20, 4–10, 12–16, 10–24

CODE Dome

14 November
20:15

Mexico	64–59	Colombia
Scoring by quarter: 19–13, 9–15, 19–16, 17–15

CODE Dome

16 November
9:00

Colombia	68–20	El Salvador
Scoring by quarter: 21–2, 13–8, 24–5, 10–5

CODE Dome

16 November
20:15

Mexico	57–83	Canada
Scoring by quarter: 12–20, 14–22, 18–27, 13–14

CODE Dome

==== Group B ====
Team	Pld	W	L	PF	PA	PD	Pts
United States (USA)	3	3	0	248	116	+132	6
Argentina (ARG)	3	2	1	194	156	+38	5
Brazil (BRA)	3	1	2	186	168	+18	4
Guatemala (GUA)	3	0	3	82	270	–188	3

14 November
9:00

Guatemala	20–95	Brazil
Scoring by quarter: 2–29, 2–24, 13–31, 3–11

CODE Dome

14 November
11:15

United States	73–46	Argentina
Scoring by quarter: 16–17, 20–4, 14–10, 23–15

CODE Dome

15 November
13:30

Guatemala	23–95	United States
Scoring by quarter: 5–28, 4–27, 6–25, 8–15

CODE Dome

15 November
15:45

Argentina	68–44	Brazil
Scoring by quarter: 19–12, 17–3, 15–17, 17–12

CODE Dome

16 November
13:30

Argentina	80–39	Guatemala
Scoring by quarter: 23–13, 18–11, 23–7, 16–8

CODE Dome

16 November
15:45

Brazil	47–80	United States
Scoring by quarter: 9–24, 13–23, 14–10, 11–23

CODE Dome

=== Elimination round ===
Quarterfinals
Canada	86
Guatemala	22
Argentina	53
Colombia	54
United States	86
El Salvador	7
Mexico	60
Brazil	58

Semifinals
Canada	58
Colombia	69
United States	76
Mexico	48

Gold-medal match
Colombia	40
United States	60
Third place
Canada	60
Mexico	42

==== Quarterfinals ====
17 November
11:15

Canada	86–22	Guatemala
Scoring by quarter: 21–5, 23–4, 22–3, 20–10

CODE Dome

17 November
13:30

Argentina	53–54	Colombia
Scoring by quarter: 17–6, 15–15, 11–17, 10–16

CODE Dome

17 November
9:00

United States	86–7	El Salvador
Scoring by quarter: 29–5, 25–0, 22–2, 10–0

CODE Dome

17 November
15:45

Mexico	60–58	Brazil
Scoring by quarter: 15–15, 18–14, 12–15, 15–14

CODE Dome

==== 5th–8th Classification ====
18 November
9:00

Guatemala	24–102	Argentina
Scoring by quarter: 8–30, 5–27, 6–22, 5–23

CODE Dome

18 November
11:15

El Salvador	28–97	Brazil
Scoring by quarter: 4–21, 7–29, 5–23, 12–24

CODE Dome

==== Semifinals ====
18 November
18:00

Canada	58–69 (OT)	Colombia
Scoring by quarter: 16–10, 14–15, 8–19, 19–13, Overtime: 1–12

CODE Dome

18 November
20:15

United States	76–48	Mexico
Scoring by quarter: 18–20, 18–11, 21–3, 19–14

CODE Dome

==== Seventh-place match ====
19 November
9:00

Guatemala	58–50	El Salvador
Scoring by quarter: 2–14, 16–10, 25–10, 15–16

CODE Dome

==== Fifth-place match ====
19 November
11:15

Argentina	61–77	Brazil
Scoring by quarter: 14–26, 16–18, 18–15, 13–18

CODE Dome

==== Bronze-medal match ====
19 November
15:45

Canada	60–42	Mexico
Scoring by quarter: 20–5, 13–8, 14–14, 13–15

CODE Dome

==== Gold-medal match ====
19 November
20:15

Colombia	40–60	United States
Scoring by quarter: 15–16, 3–15, 10–18, 12–11

CODE Dome

== Women ==
=== Preliminary round ===
==== Group A ====
Team	Pld	W	L	PF	PA	PD	Pts
Canada (CAN)	3	3	0	178	85	+93	6
Brazil (BRA)	3	2	1	222	87	+135	5
Argentina (ARG)	3	1	2	66	165	–99	4
El Salvador (ESA)	3	0	3	63	192	–129	3

13 November
9:00

Argentina	41–32	El Salvador
Scoring by quarter: 14–10, 16–12, 7–4, 4–6

CODE Dome

13 November
11:15

Canada	67–49	Brazil
Scoring by quarter: 12–9, 15–14, 21–15, 19–11

CODE Dome

14 November
13:30

Brazil	94–13	El Salvador
Scoring by quarter: 27–0, 26–5, 21–4, 20–4

CODE Dome

14 November
15:45

Canada	54–18	Argentina
Scoring by quarter: 16–4, 10–4, 16–6, 12–4

CODE Dome

15 November
18:00

Argentina	7–79	Brazil
Scoring by quarter: 2–18, 3–26, 0–14, 2–21

CODE Dome

16 November
20:15

El Salvador	18–57	Canada
Scoring by quarter: 14–4, 15–8, 10–4, 18–2

CODE Dome

==== Group B ====
Team	Pld	W	L	PF	PA	PD	Pts
United States (USA)	3	3	0	206	71	+135	9
Mexico (MEX)	3	2	1	199	111	+88	5
Guatemala (GUA)	3	1	2	73	183	–110	4
Peru (PER)	3	0	3	65	178	–113	3

13 November
13:30

United States	61–10	Peru
Scoring by quarter: 24–2, 17–2, 12–2, 8–4

CODE Dome

13 November
18:00

Mexico	77–17	Guatemala
Scoring by quarter: 27–4, 23–0, 16–6, 11–7

CODE Dome

15 November
9:00

Guatemala	41–38	Peru
Scoring by quarter: 16–8, 10–10, 5–6, 10–14

CODE Dome

15 November
11:15

Mexico	46–77	United States
Scoring by quarter: 16–17, 2–29, 17–19, 11–12

CODE Dome

16 November
11:15

United States	68–15	Guatemala
Scoring by quarter: 14–2, 20–7, 18–0, 16–6

CODE Dome

16 November
18:00

Peru	17–76	Mexico
Scoring by quarter: 5–14, 8–20, 2–25, 2–17

CODE Dome

=== Elimination round ===
Semifinals
A1	Canada	71
B2	Mexico	59
B1	United States	66
A2	Brazil	32

Gold Medal Final
A1	Canada	31
B1	United States	69
Bronze Medal Final
B2	Mexico	54
A2	Brazil	59

==== Semifinals ====
17 November
18:00

Canada	71–59	Mexico
Scoring by quarter: 23–6, 12–17, 16–18, 20–18

CODE Dome

17 November
20:15

United States	66–32	Brazil
Scoring by quarter: 17–10, 13–10, 20–4, 16–8

CODE Dome

==== Seventh-place match ====
18 November
15:45

El Salvador	24–35	Peru
Scoring by quarter: 8–9, 6–7, 4–10, 6–9

CODE Dome

==== Fifth-place match ====
18 November
13:30

Argentina	36–29	Guatemala
Scoring by quarter: 5–4, 10–14, 14–6, 7–5

CODE Dome

==== Bronze-medal match ====
19 November
15:45

Mexico	54–59	Brazil
Scoring by quarter: 16–9, 9–19, 12–18, 17–13

CODE Dome

==== Gold-medal match ====
19 November
20:15

Canada	31–69	United States
Scoring by quarter: 14–18, 4–21, 8–14, 5–16

CODE Dome
