= Ablinger =

Ablinger is a surname. Notable people with the surname include:

- Peter Ablinger (1959–2025), Austrian composer
- Walter Ablinger (born 1969), Austrian Para-cyclist
