= Cycling at the 2012 Summer Paralympics – Men's road race H2 =

Cycling, Men's road race H2 at the XIV Paralympic Games
- Venue: Brands Hatch
- Dates: September 7, 2012
- Competitors: 14 from 7 nations

Medalists
1st place, gold medalist(s)		Walter Ablinger	Austria
2nd place, silver medalist(s)		Jean-Marc Berset	Switzerland
3rd place, bronze medalist(s)		Vittorio Podesta	Italy

The men's road race H2 cycling event at the 2012 Summer Paralympics took place on September 7 at Brands Hatch. Fourteen riders from seven different nations competed. The race distance was 56 km.

== Results ==
LAP=Lapped (8 km).

Rank	Name	Country	Time
1st place, gold medalist(s)	Walter Ablinger	Austria	1:37:55
2nd place, silver medalist(s)	Jean-Marc Berset	Switzerland	1:37:59
3rd place, bronze medalist(s)	Vittorio Podesta	Italy	1:38:02
4	Lukas Weber	Switzerland	1:38:19
5	Heinz Frei	Switzerland	1:38:19
6	Max Weber	Germany	1:43:49
7	Paolo Cecchetto	Italy	1:43:51
8	Stuart McCreadie	South Africa	1:43:51
9	Matthew Updike	United States	1:45:37
10	Mark Beggs	Canada	1:52:12
11	David Franek	France	1:52:12
	Edward Maalouf	Lebanon	LAP
	Haki Doku	Albania	LAP
	Gracijano Turcinovic	Croatia	LAP
