= Goalball at the 2011 Parapan American Games =

- Venue: San Rafael Gymnasium
- Dates: 13 – 19 November 2011

Goalball was contested at the 2011 Parapan American Games from November 13 to 19 at the San Rafael Gymnasium in Guadalajara, Mexico.

== Medal summary ==
=== Medal table ===
Rank	Nation	Gold	Silver	Bronze	Total
1	Brazil	1	1	0	2
1	United States	1	1	0	2
3	Canada	0	0	1	1
3	Mexico	0	0	1	1
Totals (4 entries)		2	2	2	6

=== Medal events ===
Event	Gold	Silver	Bronze
Men	Brazil (BRA); Alexsander Celente; Leandro da Silva; Romário Marques; José Oliveira; Arestino Silva; Filippe Silvestre	United States (USA); Joseph Hamilton; Andrew Jenks; John Kusku; Tyler Merren; Donte Mickens; Daryl Walker	Mexico (MEX); Héctor Carreño; José Cerezo; Edgar Cruz; Marín Davila; Ulises Martínez; Fernando Santiago
Women	United States (USA); Jennifer Armbruster; Nicole Buck; Lisa Czechowski; Amanda Dennis; Asya Miller; Robin Theryoung	Brazil (BRA); Jéssica Alves; Ana Carolina Duarte; Claudia Gonçalves; Gleyse Portioli; Neusimar Santos; Márcia Vieira	Canada (CAN); Ashlie Andrews; Whitney Bogart; Amy Kneebone; Jillian MacSween; Nancy Morin; Cassandra Orgeles

== Schedule ==
The competition will be spread out across seven days, with the men and women competing on each day.

Preliminary round	Semifinals	M	Event finals

November	13th Sun	14th Mon	15th Tue	16th Wed	17th Thu	18th Fri	19th Sat	Gold medals
Men							M	1
Women							M	1

== Men ==
=== Preliminary round ===
Team	Pld	W	D	L	GF	GA	GD	Points
Brazil (BRA)	5	5	0	0	51	17	+34	15
Canada (CAN)	5	3	1	1	50	31	+19	10
United States (USA)	5	3	1	1	41	27	+14	10
Mexico (MEX)	5	2	0	3	35	34	+1	6
Argentina (ARG)	5	1	0	4	43	61	–18	3
El Salvador (ESA)	5	0	0	5	12	62	–50	0

13 November; 9:00	Argentina	20–10	El Salvador	San Rafael Gymnasium
13 November; 9:00		Report		San Rafael Gymnasium

13 November; 13:00	United States	5–5	Canada	San Rafael Gymnasium
13 November; 13:00		Report		San Rafael Gymnasium

13 November; 16:00	Brazil	6–3	Mexico	San Rafael Gymnasium
13 November; 16:00		Report		San Rafael Gymnasium

14 November; 9:20	United States	4–9	Brazil	San Rafael Gymnasium
14 November; 9:20		Report		San Rafael Gymnasium

14 November; 13:00	El Salvador	1–11	Mexico	San Rafael Gymnasium
14 November; 13:00		Report		San Rafael Gymnasium

14 November; 16:00	Argentina	9–14	Canada	San Rafael Gymnasium
14 November; 16:00		Report		San Rafael Gymnasium

15 November; 9:00	Argentina	3–11	Mexico	San Rafael Gymnasium
15 November; 9:00		Report		San Rafael Gymnasium

15 November; 13:00	Canada	6–12	Brazil	San Rafael Gymnasium
15 November; 13:00		Report		San Rafael Gymnasium

15 November; 16:00	El Salvador	0–10	United States	San Rafael Gymnasium
15 November; 16:00		Report		San Rafael Gymnasium

16 November; 9:00	Canada	11–1	El Salvador	San Rafael Gymnasium
16 November; 9:00		Report		San Rafael Gymnasium

16 November; 13:00	Mexico	6–10	United States	San Rafael Gymnasium
16 November; 13:00		Report		San Rafael Gymnasium

16 November; 16:00	Brazil	14–4	Argentina	San Rafael Gymnasium
16 November; 16:00		Report		San Rafael Gymnasium

17 November; 9:00	Brazil	10–0	El Salvador	San Rafael Gymnasium
17 November; 9:00		Report		San Rafael Gymnasium

17 November; 13:00	Mexico	4–14	Canada	San Rafael Gymnasium
17 November; 13:00		Report		San Rafael Gymnasium

17 November; 16:00	United States	12–7	Argentina	San Rafael Gymnasium
17 November; 16:00		Report		San Rafael Gymnasium

=== Elimination round ===
Semifinals
1	Brazil	10
4	Mexico	0
2	Canada	4
3	United States	11

Gold Medal Final
1	Brazil	5
3	United States	3
Bronze Medal Final
4	Mexico	14
2	Canada	8

==== Semifinals ====
18 November; 11:00	Brazil	10–0	Mexico	San Rafael Gymnasium
18 November; 11:00		Report		San Rafael Gymnasium

18 November; 18:00	Canada	4–11	United States	San Rafael Gymnasium
18 November; 18:00		Report		San Rafael Gymnasium

==== Bronze Medal Final ====
19 November; 13:00	Mexico	14–8	Canada	San Rafael Gymnasium
19 November; 13:00		Report		San Rafael Gymnasium

==== Gold Medal Final ====
19 November; 17:30	Brazil	5–3	United States	San Rafael Gymnasium
19 November; 17:30		Report		San Rafael Gymnasium

== Women ==
=== Preliminary round ===
Team	Pld	W	D	L	GF	GA	GD	Points
United States (USA)	4	4	0	0	28	3	+25	12
Canada (CAN)	4	3	0	1	26	9	+17	9
Brazil (BRA)	4	2	0	2	24	8	+16	6
Mexico (MEX)	4	1	0	3	11	31	–20	3
El Salvador (ESA)	4	0	0	4	0	38	–38	0

13 November; 10:30	El Salvador	0–10	Mexico	San Rafael Gymnasium
13 November; 10:30		Report		San Rafael Gymnasium

13 November; 14:30	Canada	5–3	Brazil	San Rafael Gymnasium
13 November; 14:30		Report		San Rafael Gymnasium

14 November; 10:30	Brazil	1–3	United States	San Rafael Gymnasium
14 November; 10:30		Report		San Rafael Gymnasium

14 November; 14:30	Canada	8–0	El Salvador	San Rafael Gymnasium
14 November; 14:30		Report		San Rafael Gymnasium

15 November; 10:30	Mexico	1–11	Canada	San Rafael Gymnasium
15 November; 10:30		Report		San Rafael Gymnasium

15 November; 14:30	United States	10–0	El Salvador	San Rafael Gymnasium
15 November; 14:30		Report		San Rafael Gymnasium

16 November; 10:30	El Salvador	0–10	Brazil	San Rafael Gymnasium
16 November; 10:30		Report		San Rafael Gymnasium

16 November; 14:30	United States	10–0	Mexico	San Rafael Gymnasium
16 November; 14:30		Report		San Rafael Gymnasium

17 November; 10:30	Canada	2–5	United States	San Rafael Gymnasium
17 November; 10:30		Report		San Rafael Gymnasium

17 November; 14:30	Brazil	10–0	Mexico	San Rafael Gymnasium
17 November; 14:30		Report		San Rafael Gymnasium

=== Elimination round ===
Semifinals
1	United States	10
4	Mexico	2
2	Canada	4
3	Brazil	7

Gold Medal Final
1	United States	2
3	Brazil	0
Bronze Medal Final
4	Mexico	0
2	Canada	10

==== Semifinals ====
18 November; 9:00	United States	10–2	Mexico	San Rafael Gymnasium
18 November; 9:00		Report		San Rafael Gymnasium

18 November; 16:00	Canada	4–7	Brazil	San Rafael Gymnasium
18 November; 16:00		Report		San Rafael Gymnasium

==== Bronze Medal Final ====
19 November; 11:00	Mexico	0–10	Canada	San Rafael Gymnasium
19 November; 11:00		Report		San Rafael Gymnasium

==== Gold Medal Final ====
19 November; 15:30	United States	2–0	Brazil	San Rafael Gymnasium
19 November; 15:30		Report		San Rafael Gymnasium
