= Lebanon at the Paralympics =

- IPC code: LIB
- NPC: Lebanese Paralympic Committee
- Medals: Gold 0 Silver 0 Bronze 2 Total 2

Summer appearances
- 2000; 2004; 2008; 2012; 2016; 2020; 2024

Lebanon made its Paralympic Games début at the 1960 Summer Paralympics in Rome, Italy with one athlete, Nizar Bissat, who competed in archery and in swimming.

The country reappeared at 2000 Summer Paralympics in Sydney, sending just two male representatives to compete in sprinting (T44 category). Hussein Ghandour was a non-starter in his race, while Mahmoud Habbal failed to complete his. Lebanon was absent from the 2004 Games, but returned in 2008, with a single competitor: Edward Maalouf, in cycling. Maalouf entered two events, and won bronze in each of them.

Lebanon has never taken part in any of the Winter Paralympics.

== Full results for Lebanon at the Paralympics ==
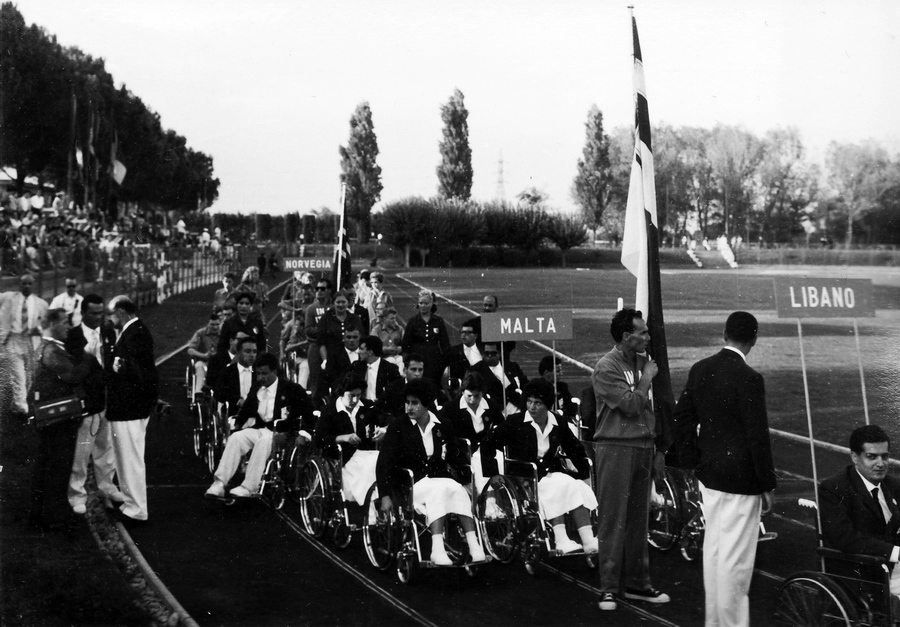
Nizar Bissat (on the right) representing Lebanon at the opening ceremony in Rome 1960

Name	Games	Sport	Event	Time	Rank
Nazar Bissat	1960 Rome	Archery	Men's Columbia Round	334	26
Nazar Bissat	1960 Rome	Swimming	Men's 50 m Backstroke C/3	1:21.7	5
Hussein Ghandour	2000 Sydney	Athletics	Men's 400 m T44	dns	dns in heat 2; did not advance
Mahmoud Habbal	2000 Sydney	Athletics	Men's 800 m T44	dnf	dnf (unranked)
Edward Maalouf	2008 Beijing	Cycling	Men's Individual Road Race HC B	1:28:26	Bronze
Edward Maalouf	2008 Beijing	Cycling	Men's Individual Time Trial HC B	22:12.91	Bronze
Edward Maalouf	2012 London	Cycling	Men's Individual Road Race H2	LAP	
Edward Maalouf	2012 London	Cycling	Men's Individual Time Trial H2	30:01.34	9th
Arz Zahreddine	2024 Paris	Athletics	Men's 100 m T64	12.30	9th in heat 2; did not advance

== See also ==
- Lebanon at the Olympics
