= Cycling at the 2012 Summer Paralympics – Men's road time trial H2 =

Cycling, Men's road time trial H2 at the XIV Paralympic Games
- Venue: Brands Hatch
- Dates: September 5, 2012
- Competitors: 14 from 11 nations

Medalists
1st place, gold medalist(s)		Heinz Frei	Switzerland
2nd place, silver medalist(s)		Walter Ablinger	Austria
3rd place, bronze medalist(s)		Vittorio Podesta	Italy

The Men's time trial H2 road cycling event at the 2012 Summer Paralympics took place on September 5 at Brands Hatch. Fourteen riders from eleven different nations competed. The race distance was 16 km.

== Results ==
Rank	Name	Country	Time
1st place, gold medalist(s)	Heinz Frei	Switzerland	26:52.39
2nd place, silver medalist(s)	Walter Ablinger	Austria	26:57.25
3rd place, bronze medalist(s)	Vittorio Podesta	Italy	27:01.98
4	Lukas Weber	Switzerland	27:27.73
5	Jean-Marc Berset	Switzerland	28:01.90
6	Matthew Updike	United States	28:44.82
7	Stuart McCreadie	South Africa	29:03.51
8	David Franek	France	29:56.61
9	Edward Maalouf	Lebanon	30:01.34
10	Max Weber	Germany	30:20.21
11	Mark Beggs	Canada	31:11.80
12	Paolo Cecchetto	Italy	32:48.48
13	Gracijano Turcinovic	Croatia	35:23.81
14	Haki Doku	Albania	38:23.73
