= Sitting volleyball at the 2011 Parapan American Games =

- Venue: Pan American Volleyball Stadium
- Dates: 14–18 November 2011

Sitting volleyball was contested at the 2011 Parapan American Games from November 14 to 18 at the Pan American Volleyball Stadium in Guadalajara, Mexico.

== Medal summary ==
=== Medal table ===
Rank	Nation	Gold	Silver	Bronze	Total
1	Brazil	1	0	0	1
2	United States	0	1	0	1
3	Canada	0	0	1	1
Totals (3 entries)		1	1	1	3

=== Medal events ===
Event	Gold	Silver	Bronze
Men	Brazil (BRA); Samuel Arantes; Carlos Barbosa; Guilherme Borrajo Faria; Wescley Conceição; Giovani de Freitas; Renato de Oliveira; Daniel Jorge; Deivisson Ladeira; Gilberto Lourenço; Wellington Platini Silva; Diogo Rebouças; Rogério Silva Camargo	United States (USA); Eric Duda; Roderick Green; Edgardo Laforest; J Dee Marinko; Edward O'Neil; Brent Rasmussen; Daniel Regan; Hugo Storer; James Stuck; Charles Swearingen	Canada (CAN); Mikael Bartholdy; Eric Dechaine; Chad Drummond; Austin Hinchey; Douglas Learoyd; Dave Marchand; Larry Matthews; Jason Naval; Bradley Quast; Jose Rebelo; Greg Stewart

== Results ==
=== Preliminary round ===
Pos	Team	Pld	W	L	Pts	SW	SL	SR	SPW	SPL	SPR	Qualification
1	United States	5	5	0	10	15	3	5.000	421	302	1.394	Semifinals
2	Brazil	5	4	1	9	14	4	3.500	426	251	1.697	Semifinals
3	Canada	5	3	2	8	11	6	1.833	374	329	1.137	Semifinals
4	Colombia	5	1	4	6	3	14	0.214	308	407	0.757	Semifinals
5	Costa Rica	5	1	4	6	5	13	0.385	303	422	0.718	
6	Mexico	5	1	4	6	4	12	0.333	269	390	0.690	

Date		Score		Set 1	Set 2	Set 3	Set 4	Set 5	Total	Report
14 Nov	Mexico	1–3	Costa Rica	25–20	18–25	23–25	20–25		86–95	
14 Nov	Brazil	2–3	United States	25–15	22–25	19–25	25–21	13–15	104–101	
14 Nov	Canada	3–0	Colombia	25–12	25–21	25–16			75–49	
14 Nov	Mexico	0–3	United States	13–25	11–25	17–25			41–75	
14 Nov	Costa Rica	2–3	Colombia	16–25	25–21	25–21	27–29	12–15	105–111	
15 Nov	Colombia	0–3	Brazil	5–25	11–25	20–25			36–75	
15 Nov	United States	3–1	Canada	25–17	20–25	25–15	25–23		95–80	
15 Nov	Mexico	3–0	Colombia	26–24	25–22	26–24			77–70	
15 Nov	Costa Rica	0–3	Brazil	16–25	6–25	4–25			26–75	
15 Nov	Mexico	0–3	Canada	16–25	17–25	13–25			46–75	
16 Nov	Brazil	3–1	Canada	25–15	25–20	22–25	25–9		97–69	
16 Nov	United States	3–0	Costa Rica	25–11	25–13	25–11			75–35	
16 Nov	Mexico	0–3	Brazil	6–25	6–25	7–25			19–75	
16 Nov	Canada	3–0	Costa Rica	25–9	25–16	25–20			75–45	
16 Nov	Colombia	0–3	United States	14–25	15–25	13–25			42–75	

=== Elimination round ===
Semifinals
1	United States	25	25	25
4	Colombia	12	12	13
2	Brazil	25	25	25
3	Canada	9	8	13

Gold Medal Final
1	United States	25	18	12	15
2	Brazil	20	25	25	25

Bronze Medal Final
3	Canada	25	25	25
4	Colombia	13	12	16

==== Semifinals ====
Date		Score		Set 1	Set 2	Set 3	Set 4	Set 5	Total	Report
17 Nov	United States	3–0	Colombia	25–12	25–12	25–13			75–37	
17 Nov	Brazil	3–0	Canada	25–9	25–8	25–13			75–30	

==== Fifth Place Game ====
Date		Score		Set 1	Set 2	Set 3	Set 4	Set 5	Total	Report
17 Nov	Costa Rica	0–3	Mexico	20–25	20–25	15–25			55–75	

==== Bronze Medal Final ====
Date		Score		Set 1	Set 2	Set 3	Set 4	Set 5	Total	Report
18 Nov	Colombia	0–3	Canada	13–25	12–25	16–25			41–75	

==== Gold Medal Final ====
Date		Score		Set 1	Set 2	Set 3	Set 4	Set 5	Total	Report
18 Nov	United States	1–3	Brazil	25–20	18–25	12–25	15–25		70–95	
