= Cycling at the 2011 Parapan American Games =

- Venue: Pan American Velodrome/Pan American Games circuit
- Dates: November 13 - November 19
- Competitors: 114 from 11 nations

Cycling was contested at the 2011 Parapan American Games from November 13 to 19 at the Pan American Velodrome in Guadalajara, Mexico. Road cycling events were held on November 13 and 19, while track cycling events were held on November 15 and 16.

== Medal summary ==
=== Medal table ===
Rank	Nation	Gold	Silver	Bronze	Total
1	United States (USA)	9	11	4	24
2	Canada (CAN)	6	3	4	13
3	Colombia (COL)	4	4	4	12
4	Brazil (BRA)	3	2	3	8
5	Argentina (ARG)	1	1	3	5
6	Mexico (MEX)	0	1	1	2
7	Dominican Republic (DOM)	0	1	0	1
Totals (7 entries)		23	23	19	65

=== Medal events ===
==== Road cycling ====
Event	Class	Gold	Silver	Bronze
Mixed time trial	Mixed time trial B	Robbi Weldon/Lyne Bessette; Canada	Karissa Whitsell/Lisa Turnbull; United States	Daniel Chalifour/Ed Veal; Canada
Mixed time trial	Mixed time trial C1-5	Soelito Gohr; Brazil	Diego Dueñas; Colombia	João Schwindt; Brazil
Mixed time trial	Mixed time trial H1-4	Oscar Sanchez; United States	Matthew Updike; United States	Rico Morneau; Canada
Mixed time trial	Mixed time trial T1-2	Steven Peace; United States	Shelley Gautier; Canada	Néstor Ayala; Colombia
Men's road race	Men's road race B	Sebastián Durango/Nelson Serna; Colombia	Eliecer Orjuela/William Rojas; Colombia	Daniel Chalifour/Ed Veal; Canada
Men's road race	Men's road race C1-3	Esneider Muñoz; Colombia	Michael Farrell; United States	Álvaro Galvez; Colombia
Men's road race	Men's road race C4-5	Soelito Gohr; Brazil	Rodny Minier; Dominican Republic	João Schwindt; Brazil
Men's road race	Men's road race H2-4	Oscar Sanchez; United States	Matthew Updike; United States	Gonzalo Valdovinos; Mexico
Women's road race	Women's road race B	Lyne Bessette/Robbi Weldon; Canada	Lisa Turnbull/Karissa Whitsell; United States	Alejandra Alliegro/Lidia Britos; Argentina
Women's road race	Women's road race C1-3	Greta Neimanas; United States	Marie-Claude Molnar; Canada	Allison Jones; United States
Women's road race	Women's road race H3-4	Monica Bascio; United States	Ivonne Reyes; Mexico	Not awarded
Mixed road race	Mixed road race H1M/H1-2W	Myriam Adam; Canada	Jady Martins; Brazil	Not awarded
Mixed road race	Mixed road race T1-2	Néstor Ayala; Colombia	Steven Peace; United States	Marie-Ève Croteau; Canada

==== Track cycling ====
Event	Class	Gold	Silver	Bronze
Women's time trial	Women's 500 metres C1-5	Jennifer Schuble; United States	Greta Neimanas; United States	Allison Jones; United States
Women's time trial	Women's 1000 metres B	Robbi Weldon/Lyne Bessette; Canada	Karissa Whitsell/Lisa Turnbull; United States	Lídia Britos/Alejandra Alliegro; Argentina
Men's time trial	Men's 1000 metres C1-5	Rodrigo López; Argentina; WR	Vincent Juarez; United States	Soelito Göhr; Brazil
Men's time trial	Men's 1000 metres B	Clark Rachfal/David Swanson; United States	Daniel Chalifour/Ed Veal; Canada	Eliecer Orujela/William Rojas; Colombia
Women's individual pursuit	Women's 3000 metres B	Robbi Weldon/Lyne Bessette; Canada	Karissa Whitsell/Lisa Turnbull; United States	Lídia Britos/Alejandra Alliegro; Argentina
Women's individual pursuit	Women's 3000 metres C1-3	Allison Jones; United States	Cristina Otero; Argentina	Not awarded
Women's individual pursuit	Women's 3000 metres C4-5	Jennifer Schuble; United States	Greta Neimanas; United States	Not awarded
Men's individual pursuit	Men's 4000 metres B	Daniel Chalifour/Ed Veal; Canada	Javier Serna/Sebastian Durango; Colombia	Clark Rachfal/David Swanson; United States
Men's individual pursuit	Men's 3000 metres C1-3	Esneider Muñoz; Colombia	Álvaro Galviz; Colombia	Michael Farrell; United States
Men's individual pursuit	Men's 4000 metres C4-5	João Schwindt; Brazil	Soelito Göhr; Brazil	Diego Dueñas; Colombia
