= Canada at the 2011 Parapan American Games =

- Flag of Canada
- IPC code: CAN
- NPC: Canadian Paralympic Committee

in Guadalajara, Mexico November 12, 2011 – November 20, 2011
- Competitors: 130 in 11 sports
- Medals Ranked 8th: Gold 13 Silver 22 Bronze 28 Total 63

Parapan American Games appearances (overview)
- 1999; 2003; 2007; 2011; 2015; 2019; 2023

Canada participated in the 2011 Parapan American Games.

== Medalists ==
Medals by sport
Sport	1st place, gold medalist(s)	2nd place, silver medalist(s)	3rd place, bronze medalist(s)	Total
Cycling	6	3	4	13
Swimming	3	6	8	17
Boccia	2	1	2	5
Table tennis	1	2	0	3
Archery	1	1	0	2
Athletics	0	8	8	16
Wheelchair basketball	0	1	1	2
Judo	0	0	3	3
Goalball	0	0	1	1
Sitting volleyball	0	0	1	1
Total	13	22	28	63

Medal	Name	Sport	Event	Date
Gold	Robbi Weldon; Lyne Bessette	Cycling	Mixed road time trial B	November 13
Gold	Kirstie Kasko	Swimming	Women's 200 metres freestyle S14	November 14
Gold	Daniel Chalifour; Ed Veal	Cycling	Men's individual track pursuit B	November 15
Gold	Robbi Weldon; Lyne Bessette	Cycling	Women's individual track pursuit B	November 15
Gold	Ian Kent	Table tennis	Men's singles C8	November 15
Gold	Adam Dukovich	Boccia	Individual BC2	November 16
Gold	Paul Gauthier	Boccia	Individual BC3	November 16
Gold	Robbi Weldon; Lyne Bessette	Cycling	Women's 1,000 metres track time trial B	November 16
Gold	Adam Rahier	Swimming	Men's 100 metres backstroke S14	November 16
Gold	Kirstie Kasko	Swimming	Women's 100 metres backstroke S14	November 16
Gold	Kevin Evans	Archery	Men's individual compound	November 17
Gold	Robbi Weldon; Lyne Bessette	Cycling	Women's road race B	November 19
Gold	Myriam Adam	Cycling	Mixed road race H1M/H1-2W	November 19
Silver	Shelley Gautier	Cycling	Mixed road time trial T1-2	November 13
Silver	Adam Rahier	Swimming	Men's 100 metres breaststroke SB14	November 13
Silver	Jana Murphy	Swimming	Women's 100 metres breaststroke SB14	November 13
Silver	Christopher Sergeant-Tsonos	Swimming	Men's 100 metres backstroke S8	November 13
Silver	Kyle Edward Whitehouse	Athletics	Men's 100 metres T38	November 14
Silver	Kevin Strybosch	Athletics	Men's discus throw F37/38	November 14
Silver	Adam Rahier	Swimming	Men's 200 metres freestyle S14	November 14
Silver	Hannah Smith	Swimming	Women's 100 metres breaststroke SB9	November 14
Silver	Virginia McLachlan	Athletics	Women's 200 metres T38	November 15
Silver	Stephanie Chan	Table tennis	Women's singles C7-9	November 15
Silver	Sarah White	Athletics	Women's 100 metres T53	November 16
Silver	Marco Dispaltro	Boccia	Individual BC4	November 16
Silver	Daniel Chalifour; Ed Veal	Cycling	Men's 1,000 metres track time trial B	November 16
Silver	Jana Murphy	Swimming	Women's 100 metres backstroke S14	November 16
Silver	Robert Hudson	Archery	Men's individual compound	November 17
Silver	Virginia McLachlan	Athletics	Women's 100 metres T38	November 17
Silver	Kyle Edward Whitehouse	Athletics	Men's 200 metres T38	November 17
Silver	Jason Joseph Dunkerley	Athletics	Men's 1,500 metres T11	November 17
Silver	Shayne Dobson	Athletics	Men's 1,500 metres T37	November 18
Silver	Ian Kent; Masoud Mojtahed	Table tennis	Men's team C6-8	November 18
Silver	Marie-Claude Molnar	Cycling	Women's road race C1-3	November 19
Silver	Team Canada	Wheelchair basketball	Women	November 19
Bronze	Daniel Chalifour; Ed Veal	Cycling	Mixed road time trial B	November 13
Bronze	Rico Morneau	Cycling	Mixed road time trial H1-4	November 13
Bronze	Jean-Sebastien Lapointe	Swimming	Men's 400 metres freestyle S7	November 13
Bronze	Maxime Rousselle	Swimming	Men's 100 metres breaststroke SB14	November 13
Bronze	Isaiah Christophe	Athletics	Men's 100 metres T54	November 14
Bronze	Jackie Keith Marciano	Athletics	Men's 400 metres T44	November 14
Bronze	Christopher Sergeant-Tsonos	Swimming	Men's 50 metres freestyle S8	November 14
Bronze	Maxime Rousselle	Swimming	Men's 200 metres freestyle S14	November 14
Bronze	Jana Murphy	Swimming	Women's 200 metres freestyle S14	November 14
Bronze	Thomas Swinkels	Swimming	Men's 100 metres breaststroke SB9	November 14
Bronze	Kennedy Pasay	Swimming	Women's 100 metres breaststroke SB9	November 14
Bronze	Danielle Kisser	Swimming	Women's 100 metres breaststroke SB6	November 14
Bronze	Braedon Samuel Dolfo	Athletics	Men's 100 metres T13	November 15
Bronze	Dave Richer	Boccia	Individual BC2	November 16
Bronze	Josh Vandervies	Boccia	Individual BC4	November 16
Bronze	Christy Campbell	Athletics	Women's 100 metres T34	November 17
Bronze	Alister McQueen	Athletics	Men's javelin throw F44	November 17
Bronze	Shayne Dobson	Athletics	Men's 800 metres T37	November 17
Bronze	Alister McQueen	Athletics	Men's 200 metres T44	November 18
Bronze	Jason Joseph Dunkerley	Athletics	Men's 5,000 metres T11	November 18
Bronze	Timothy Rees	Judo	Men's 100 kg	November 18
Bronze	Tony Walby	Judo	Men's +100 kg	November 18
Bronze	Team Canada	Sitting volleyball	Men	November 18
Bronze	Daniel Chalifour; Ed Veal	Cycling	Men's road race B	November 19
Bronze	Marie-Eve Croteau	Cycling	Mixed road race T1-2	November 19
Bronze	Team Canada	Goalball	Women	November 19
Bronze	Team Canada	Wheelchair basketball	Men	November 19
Bronze	Justin Karn	Judo	Men's 60 kg	November 20

== Archery ==
Canada sent two male and one female athlete to compete.

== Athletics ==
Canada sent thirteen male and six female athletes to compete.

== Boccia ==
Canada sent ten male and three female athletes to compete.

== Cycling ==
Canada sent eleven male and seven female athletes to compete. Eight male and six female athletes competed in the road cycling tournament, while three male athletes and one female athlete competed in the track cycling tournament.

== Goalball ==
Canada sent two teams of six athletes each to compete in the men's and women's tournaments.

== Judo ==
Canada sent three male athletes to compete.

== Sitting volleyball ==
Canada sent a team of eleven athletes to compete.

== Swimming ==
Canada sent twelve male and nine female swimmers to compete.

== Table tennis ==
Canada sent four male athletes and one female athlete to compete.

== Wheelchair basketball ==
Canada sent two teams of twelve athletes to compete in the men's and women's tournaments.

== Wheelchair tennis ==
Canada sent two male athletes to compete.

== See also ==
- Canada at the 2011 Pan American Games
- Canada at the 2012 Summer Paralympics
