= Archery at the 2011 Parapan American Games =

- Venue: Pan American Archery Stadium
- Dates: 15—17 November
- Competitors: 23 from 6 nations

Archery was contested at the 2011 Parapan American Games from 15 to 17 November 2011 at the Pan American Archery Stadium in Guadalajara, Mexico.

== Medal summary ==
=== Medal table ===
Rank	Nation	Gold	Silver	Bronze	Total
1	United States	1	2	3	6
2	Canada	1	1	0	2
3	Mexico	1	0	0	1
Totals (3 entries)		3	3	3	9

=== Medal events ===
Event	Gold	Silver	Bronze
Men's recurve	José Antonio Baez; Mexico	Michael Lukow; United States	Russell Wolfe; United States
Men's compound	Kevin Evans; Canada	Robert Hudson; Canada	Lewis Denton; United States
Women's recurve	Lee Ford; United States	Natalie Wells; United States	D'arce Hess; United States
