= Brazil at the 2011 Parapan American Games =

- IPC code: BRA
- NPC: Brazilian Paralympic Committee

in Guadalajara, Mexico
- Competitors: 331 in 13 sports
- Flag bearer: André Brasil
- Medals Ranked 1st: Gold 81 Silver 61 Bronze 55 Total 197

Parapan American Games appearances (overview)
- 1999; 2003; 2007; 2011; 2015; 2019; 2023

Brazil participated in the 2011 Parapan American Games.

== Medalists ==
Medals by sport
Sport	1st place, gold medalist(s)	2nd place, silver medalist(s)	3rd place, bronze medalist(s)	Total
Swimming	33	23	29	85
Athletics	27	23	10	60
Table tennis	12	6	6	24
Cycling	3	2	3	8
Judo	2	4	1	7
Goalball	1	1	0	2
Boccia	1	0	2	3
Football 5-a-side	1	0	0	1
Sitting volleyball	1	0	0	1
Powerlifting	0	2	2	4
Wheelchair basketball	0	0	1	1
Wheelchair tennis	0	0	1	1
Total	81	61	55	197

Medal	Name	Sport	Event	Date
Gold	Soelito Gohr	Cycling	Mixed road time trial C1-5	November 13
Gold	Ronaldo Santos	Swimming	Men's 400 metre freestyle S7	November 13
Gold	Caio Oliveira	Swimming	Men's 100 metre backstroke S8	November 13
Gold	Ronystony Cordeiro; Adriano de Lima; Clodoaldo Silva; Daniel Dias	Swimming	Men's 4 x 50 metre freestyle relay 20 points	November 13
Gold	Edson Pinheiro	Athletics	Men's 100 metres T38	November 14
Gold	Shirlene Coelho	Athletics	Women's shot put F35/36/37	November 14
Gold	Carlos Farrenberg	Swimming	Men's 50 metre freestyle S13	November 14
Gold	Genezi Andrade	Swimming	Men's 50 metre freestyle S3	November 14
Gold	Andre Brasil	Swimming	Men's 100 metre breaststroke SB9	November 14
Gold	Carlos Lopes Maciel	Swimming	Men's 100 metre breaststroke SB8	November 14
Gold	Lucas Prado	Athletics	Men's 100 metres T11	November 15
Gold	Terezinha Guilhermina	Athletics	Women's 100 metres T11	November 15
Gold	Yohansson Nascimento	Athletics	Men's 100 metres T46	November 15
Gold	Ariosvaldo Fernandes Silva	Athletics	Men's 100 metres T53	November 15
Gold	Jenifer Santos	Athletics	Women's 200 metres T38	November 15
Gold	Thierb Siqueira	Athletics	Men's 400 metres T12	November 15
Gold	Shirlene Coelho	Athletics	Women's Javelin Throw F37/38	November 15
Gold	Vanilton Filho	Swimming	Men's 50 metres Freestyle S9	November 15
Gold	Andre Brasil	Swimming	Men's 50 metres Freestyle S10	November 15
Gold	Caio Oliveira	Swimming	Men's 400 metres Freestyle S8	November 15
Gold	Daniel Dias	Swimming	Men's 50 metres Butterfly S5	November 15
Gold	Joana Silva	Swimming	Women's 50 metres Butterfly S5	November 15
Gold	Phelipe Rodrigues; Daniel Dias; Vanilton Filho; Andre Brasil	Swimming	Men's 4 x 100 metres Freestyle Relay 34 points	November 15
Gold	Iranildo Conceicao	Table tennis	Men's Singles C1-2	November 15
Gold	Ezequiel Babes	Table tennis	Men's Singles C4	November 15
Gold	Joyce F. de Oliveira	Table tennis	Women's Singles C4	November 15
Gold	Claudiomiro Segatto	Table tennis	Men's Singles C5	November 15
Gold	Carlo di Franco	Table tennis	Men's Singles C6	November 15
Gold	Jane K. Rodriguez	Table tennis	Women's Singles C7-9	November 15
Gold	Carlos A. Carbinatti	Table tennis	Men's Singles C10	November 15
Gold	Lucas Martins	Table tennis	Men's Singles C11	November 15
Gold	Iliane Faust	Table tennis	Women's Singles C11	November 15
Gold	Lucas Prado	Athletics	Men's 200 metres T11	November 16
Gold	Thierb Siqueira	Athletics	Men's 200 metres T12	November 16
Gold	Fabio Moraes	Boccia	Individual BC4	November 16
Gold	Joao A. Schwindt	Cycling	Men's Individual track pursuit C4-5	November 16
Gold	Vanilton Filho	Swimming	Men's 400 metres Freestyle S9	November 16
Gold	Andre Brasil	Swimming	Men's 400 metres Freestyle S10	November 16
Gold	Daniel Dias	Swimming	Men's 100 metres Breaststroke SB4	November 16
Gold	Daniel Dias	Swimming	Men's 200 metres individual medley SM6	November 16
Gold	Andre Oliveira	Athletics	Men's long jump F44	November 17
Gold	Jenifer Santos	Athletics	Women's 100 metres T38	November 17
Gold	Edson Pinheiro	Athletics	Men's 200 metres T38	November 17
Gold	Yohansson Nascimento	Athletics	Men's 200 metres T46	November 17
Gold	Ariosvaldo Fernandes Silva	Athletics	Men's 200 metres T53	November 17
Gold	Terezinha Guilhermina	Athletics	Women's 400 metres T12	November 17
Gold	Odair Santos	Athletics	Men's 1,500 metres T11	November 17
Gold	Marivana Oliveira	Athletics	Women's discus throw F35/36/37	November 17
Gold	Roseane Santos	Athletics	Women's discus throw F57/58	November 17
Gold	Francisco Lima	Athletics	Men's javelin throw F44	November 17
Gold	Daniel Dias	Swimming	Men's 50 metres freestyle S5	November 17
Gold	Joana Silva	Swimming	Women's 50 metres freestyle S5	November 17
Gold	Matheus Silva	Swimming	Men's 200 metres individual medley SM9	November 17
Gold	Daniel Dias; Francisco Avelino; Jeferson Amaro; Clodoaldo Silva	Swimming	Men's 4 x 50 metres medley relay 20 points	November 17
Gold	Terezinha Guilhermina	Athletics	Women's 200 metres T11	November 18
Gold	Daniel Silva	Athletics	Men's 400 metres T11	November 18
Gold	Odair Santos	Athletics	Men's 5,000 metres T11	November 18
Gold	Francisco Daniel Coelho da Silva	Athletics	Men's 1,500 metres T37	November 18
Gold	Paulo Souza	Athletics	Men's discus throw F35/36	November 18
Gold	Claudiney Batista dos Santos	Athletics	Men's javelin throw F57/58	November 18
Gold	Giovana Pilla	Judo	Women's +70 kg	November 18
Gold	Team Brazil	Sitting volleyball	Men	November 18
Gold	Joana Silva	Swimming	Women's 100 metres freestyle S5	November 18
Gold	Daniel Dias	Swimming	Men's 100 metres freestyle S5	November 18
Gold	Nelio Almeida	Swimming	Men's 50 metres butterfly S7	November 18
Gold	Daniel Dias	Swimming	Men's 50 metres backstroke S5	November 18
Gold	Edenia Garcia	Swimming	Women's 50 metres backstroke S5	November 18
Gold	David Andrade; Welder Camargo; Iranildo Conceicao; Ronaldo Pinheiro	Table tennis	Men's team C1-3	November 18
Gold	Francisco W. Melo; Carlo di Franco; Joao F. Martins; Paulo S. Salmin	Table tennis	Men's team C6-8	November 18
Gold	Carlos A. Carbinatti; Alexandre Lazarin; Edimilson M. Pinheiro; Guilherme Riggio	Table tennis	Men's team C9-10	November 18
Gold	Soelito Gohr	Cycling	Men's road race C4-5	November 19
Gold	Team Brazil	Goalball	Men	November 19
Gold	Vanilton Filho	Swimming	Men's 100 metres freestyle S9	November 19
Gold	Andre Brasil	Swimming	Men's 100 metres freestyle S10	November 19
Gold	Carlos Farrenberg	Swimming	Men's 100 metres freestyle S13	November 19
Gold	Daniel Dias	Swimming	Men's 200 metres freestyle S5	November 19
Gold	Joana Silva	Swimming	Women's 200 metres freestyle S5	November 19
Gold	Talisson Glock	Swimming	Men's 100 metres backstroke S6	November 19
Gold	Daniel Dias; Matheus Silva; Andre Brasil; Phelipe Rodrigues	Swimming	Men's 4 x 100 metres medley relay 34 points	November 19
Gold	Team Brazil	Football 5-a-side	Men	November 20
Gold	Karla Ferreira	Judo	Women's 48 kg	November 20
Silver	Thiago Souza	Athletics	Men's 100 metres T54	November 14
Silver	Marivana Oliveira	Athletics	Women's shot put F35/36/37	November 14
Silver	Joana Helena Silva	Athletics	Women's 400 metres T13	November 14
Silver	Edson Pinheiro	Athletics	Men's 400 metres T38	November 14
Silver	William Santana	Swimming	Men's 50 metre freestyle S8	November 14
Silver	Matheus Rheine	Swimming	Men's 50 metre freestyle S11	November 14
Silver	Adriano de Lima	Swimming	Men's 100 metre breaststroke SB5	November 14
Silver	Matheus Silva	Swimming	Men's 100 metre breaststroke SB9	November 14
Silver	Leticia Ferreira	Swimming	Women's 200 metre individual medley SM5	November 14
Silver	Daniel Silva	Athletics	Men's 100 metres T11	November 15
Silver	Jerusa Geber Santos	Athletics	Women's 100 metres T11	November 15
Silver	Ana Tercia Soares	Athletics	Women's 100 metres T12	November 15
Silver	Andre Andrade	Athletics	Men's 100 metres T13	November 15
Silver	Lucas Ferrari	Athletics	Men's 100 metres T37	November 15
Silver	Alex Menconca	Athletics	Men's 5,000 metres T12	November 15
Silver	Matheus Silva	Swimming	Men's 50 metres freestyle S9	November 15
Silver	Phelipe Rodrigues	Swimming	Men's 50 metres freestyle S10	November 15
Silver	Clodoaldo Silva	Swimming	Men's 50 metres butterfly S5	November 15
Silver	Renato Silva	Swimming	Men's 100 metres breaststroke SB12	November 15
Silver	Raquel Viel	Swimming	Women's 100 metres breaststroke SB12	November 15
Silver	Ronaldo Pinheiro	Table tennis	Men's singles C1-2	November 15
Silver	David Andrade	Table tennis	Men's singles C3	November 15
Silver	Ivanildo Pessoa	Table tennis	Men's singles C4	November 15
Silver	Paulo S. Salmin	Table tennis	Men's singles C8	November 15
Silver	Sheila Finder	Athletics	Women's 100 metres T46	November 16
Silver	Daniel Silva	Athletics	Men's 200 metres T11	November 16
Silver	Soelito Gohr	Cycling	Men's individual track pursuit C4-5	November 16
Silver	Phelipe Rodrigues	Swimming	Men's 400 metres freestyle S10	November 16
Silver	Camille Cruz	Swimming	Women's 400 metres freestyle S9	November 16
Silver	Moises Batista	Swimming	Men's 50 metres breaststroke SB3	November 16
Silver	Viviane Soares	Athletics	Women's 100 metres T13	November 17
Silver	Shirlene Coelho	Athletics	Women's discus throw F35/36/37	November 17
Silver	Francisco Daniel Coelho da Silva	Athletics	Men's 800 metres T37	November 17
Silver	Bruno Carra	Powerlifting	Men's 48 - 56 kg	November 17
Silver	Clodoaldo Silva	Swimming	Men's 50 metres freestyle S5	November 17
Silver	Caio Oliveira	Swimming	Men's 200 metres individual medley SM8	November 17
Silver	Jerusa Geber Santos	Athletics	Women's 200 metres T11	November 18
Silver	Ana Tercia Soares	Athletics	Women's 200 metres T12	November 18
Silver	Andre Andrade	Athletics	Men's 200 metres T13	November 18
Silver	Lucas Ferrari	Athletics	Men's 200 metres T37	November 18
Silver	Alan Fonteles Cardoso Oliveira	Athletics	Men's 200 metres T44	November 18
Silver	Andre Andrade	Athletics	Men's 400 metres T13	November 18
Silver	Ariosvaldo Fernandes Silva	Athletics	Men's 400 metres T53	November 18
Silver	Thierb Siqueira	Athletics	Men's 800 metres T12	November 18
Silver	Antonio Tenorio	Judo	Men's 100 kg	November 18
Silver	Wilians Silva	Judo	Men's +100 kg	November 18
Silver	Caio Oliveira	Swimming	Men's 100 metres freestyle S8	November 18
Silver	Clodoaldo Silva	Swimming	Men's 100 metres freestyle S5	November 18
Silver	Francisco Avelino	Swimming	Men's 50 metres backstroke S5	November 18
Silver	Camille Cruz	Swimming	Women's 100 metres backstroke S9	November 18
Silver	Ezequiel Babes; Ecildo Lopes; Ivanildo Pessoa; Claudiomiro Segatto	Table tennis	Men's team C4-5	November 18
Silver	Joyce F. de Oliveira; Maria L. Pereira	Table tennis	Women's team C4-5	November 18
Silver	Jady Martins	Cycling	Mixed road race H1M/H1 - 2W	November 19
Silver	Team Brazil	Goalball	Women	November 19
Silver	Daniele Bernardes	Judo	Women's 63 kg	November 19
Silver	Rodrigo Marques	Powerlifting	Men's 90 kg - +100 kg	November 19
Silver	Phelipe Rodrigues	Swimming	Men's 100 metres freestyle S10	November 19
Silver	Camille Cruz	Swimming	Women's 100 metres freestyle S9	November 19
Silver	Clodoaldo Silva	Swimming	Men's 200 metres freestyle S5	November 19
Silver	Jeferson Amaro	Swimming	Men's 100 metres backstroke S6	November 19
Silver	Magno Marques	Judo	Men's 66 kg	November 20
Bronze	Joao Schwindt	Cycling	Mixed road time trial C1-5	November 13
Bronze	Adriano de Lima	Swimming	Men's 400 metre freestyle S6	November 13
Bronze	Vanilton Filho	Swimming	Men's 100 metre butterfly S9	November 13
Bronze	Renato Silva	Swimming	Men's 200 metre individual medley SM12	November 13
Bronze	Alan Fonteles Cardoso Oliveira	Athletics	Men's 100 metres T44	November 14
Bronze	Paulo Pereira	Athletics	Men's 400 metres T38	November 14
Bronze	Ronystony Cordeiro	Swimming	Men's 50 metre freestyle S4	November 14
Bronze	Joao de Castro Almeida	Swimming	Men's 50 metre freestyle S13	November 14
Bronze	Regiane Nunes Silva	Swimming	Women's 50 metre freestyle S12	November 14
Bronze	Nelio Almeida	Swimming	Men's 100 metre breaststroke SB6	November 14
Bronze	Gabriela Cantagallo	Swimming	Women's 100 metre breaststroke SB8	November 14
Bronze	Jhulia Santos	Athletics	Women's 100 metres T11	November 15
Bronze	Roseane Santos	Athletics	Women's shot put F57/58	November 15
Bronze	Soelito Gohr	Cycling	Men's 1,000 metres track time trial C1-5	November 15
Bronze	Adriano de Lima	Swimming	Men's 50 metres freestyle S6	November 15
Bronze	Camille Cruz	Swimming	Women's 50 metres freestyle S9	November 15
Bronze	Alexandre Fernandes	Swimming	Men's 400 metres freestyle S8	November 15
Bronze	Jeferson Amaro	Swimming	Men's 50 metres butterfly S6	November 15
Bronze	Maria Silva	Swimming	Women's 50 metres butterfly S6	November 15
Bronze	Welder Camargo	Table tennis	Men's singles C3	November 15
Bronze	Maria L. Pereira	Table tennis	Women's singles C5	November 15
Bronze	Francisco W. Melo	Table tennis	Men's singles C8	November 15
Bronze	Guilherme Riggio	Table tennis	Men's singles C9	November 15
Bronze	Juliano Fiorentin	Table tennis	Men's singles C11	November 15
Bronze	Claudiney Batista dos Santos	Athletics	Men's discus throw F57/58	November 16
Bronze	Jose Carlos Chagas	Boccia	Individual BC1	November 16
Bronze	Clodoaldo Massardi	Boccia	Individual BC3	November 16
Bronze	Ronaldo Santos	Swimming	Men's 50 metres freestyle S7	November 16
Bronze	Susana Ribeiro	Swimming	Women's 400 metres freestyle S9	November 16
Bronze	Genezi Andrade	Swimming	Men's 50 metres breaststroke SB2	November 16
Bronze	Francisco Avelino	Swimming	Men's 100 metres breaststroke SB4	November 16
Bronze	Leticia Ferreira	Swimming	Women's 100 metres breaststroke SB4	November 16
Bronze	Gutemberg Ferraz	Swimming	Men's 100 metres backstroke S14	November 16
Bronze	Adriano de Lima	Swimming	Men's 200 metres individual medley SM6	November 16
Bronze	Joana Helena Silva	Athletics	Women's 100 metres T13	November 17
Bronze	Paulo Pereira	Athletics	Men's 200 metres T38	November 17
Bronze	Carlos J. Barto Silva	Athletics	Men's 1,500 metres T11	November 17
Bronze	Alexandre Gouveia	Powerlifting	Men's 48 kg - 56 kg	November 17
Bronze	Francisco Avelino	Swimming	Men's 50 metres freestyle S5	November 17
Bronze	Adriano de Lima	Swimming	Men's 100 metres freestyle S6	November 17
Bronze	William Santana	Swimming	Men's 200 metres individual medley SM8	November 17
Bronze	Maurício Pommê; Carlos Santos	Wheelchair tennis	Men's doubles	November 17
Bronze	Carlos J. Barto Silva	Athletics	Men's 400 metres T11	November 18
Bronze	Yohansson Nascimento	Athletics	Men's 400 metres T46	November 18
Bronze	Luiz Carlos Novaes	Powerlifting	Men's 75 kg - 82.5 kg	November 18
Bronze	Caio Oliveira	Swimming	Men's 100 metres butterfly S8	November 18
Bronze	Rosangela Azevedo; Luana Couto	Table tennis	Women's team C1-3	November 18
Bronze	Joao A. Schwindt	Cycling	Men's road race C4-5	November 19
Bronze	Harlley Pereira	Judo	Men's 81 kg	November 19
Bronze	Matheus Silva	Swimming	Men's 100 metres freestyle S9	November 19
Bronze	Joao de Castro Almeida	Swimming	Men's 100 metres freestyle S13	November 19
Bronze	Regiane Nunes Silva	Swimming	Women's 100 metres freestyle S12	November 19
Bronze	Ronaldo Santos	Swimming	Men's 100 metres backstroke S7	November 19
Bronze	Genezi Andrade	Swimming	Men's 150 metres individual medley SM3	November 19
Bronze	Team Brazil	Wheelchair basketball	Women	November 19

== Archery ==
Brazil sent six male and one female athlete to compete.

== Athletics ==
Brazil sent 26 male and 14 female athletes to compete.

== Boccia ==
Brazil sent eight male and four female athletes to compete.

== Cycling ==
Brazil sent eight male and four female athletes to compete. Four male and two female athletes will compete in the road cycling tournament, while four male and two female athletes will compete in the track cycling tournament.

== Football 5-a-side ==
Brazil sent a team of eight athletes to compete.

== Goalball ==
Brazil sent two teams of six athletes each to compete in the men's and women's tournaments.

== Judo ==
Brazil sent seven male and six female athletes to compete.

== Powerlifting ==
Brazil sent ten male and five female athletes to compete.

== Sitting volleyball ==
Brazil sent a team of twelve athletes to compete.

== Swimming ==
Brazil sent 28 male and 11 female swimmers to compete.

== Table tennis ==
Brazil sent 25 male and 7 female table tennis players to compete.

== Wheelchair basketball ==
Brazil sent two teams of twelve athletes to compete in the men's and women's tournaments.

== Wheelchair tennis ==
Brazil sent two male and two female athletes to compete.

== See also ==
- Brazil at the 2011 Pan American Games
- Brazil at the 2012 Summer Paralympics
