= Gledson da Paixão =

Brazilian blind footballer (born 1990)

Personal information
- Born: 10 September 1990 (age 35) Salvador, Brazil

Sport
- Sport: 5-a-side football
Medal record
Representing Brazil
Paralympic Games
| Gold medal – first place | 2012 London | Men's team |
| Gold medal – first place | 2020 Tokyo | Men's team |
Parapan American Games
| Gold medal – first place | 2011 Guadalajara | Men's team |
| Gold medal – first place | 2019 Lima | Men's team |

Gledson da Paixão Barros (born 10 September 1990) is a Brazilian blind footballer who plays as winger. He has played for the Brazilian national team since 2006, he has won two Paralympic gold medals in 2012 and 2020 Summer Paralympics.

Da Paixão lost his sight aged six due to optic atrophy.
