= Andrés Andrade =

Andrés Andrade may refer to:

- Andrés Andrade (footballer, born 1989), Colombian football midfielder
- Andrés Andrade (footballer, born 1998), Panamanian football left-back
- Andrés Andrade (tennis) (born 1998), Ecuadorian tennis player

== See also ==
- André Andrade (disambiguation)
