= Lebanon at the 2012 Summer Paralympics =

- IPC code: LIB
- NPC: Lebanese Paralympic Committee

in London
- Competitors: 1 in 1 sport
- Flag bearer: Edward Maalouf
- Medals: Gold 0 Silver 0 Bronze 0 Total 0

Summer Paralympics appearances (overview)
- 2000; 2004; 2008; 2012; 2016; 2020; 2024

Lebanon competed at the 2012 Summer Paralympics in London, United Kingdom from August 29 to September 9, 2012. Lebanese Paralympian, Edward Maalouf, who was sponsored by the British Embassy in Beirut, became the only qualified Paralympic athlete representing Lebanon at the London 2012 Paralympics.

== Cycling ==
=== Road ===
Men

Athlete	Event	Time	Rank
Edward Maalouf	Road Race H2	LAP	
Edward Maalouf	Time Trial H2	30:01.34	9

== See also ==
- Lebanon at the Paralympics
- Lebanon at the 2012 Summer Olympics
