= Thierb Siqueira =

Brazilian Paralympic sprinter

Personal information
- Full name: Thierb da Costa Siqueira
- Born: 12 February 1990 (age 36) Rio Branco, Brazil
- Height: 1.78 m (5 ft 10 in)

Sport
- Sport: Para athletics
- Disability class: T12
- Event: Sprint
Medal record
Men's para athletics
Representing Brazil
Parapan American Games
Gold medal – first place	2011 Guadalajara	200m T12
Gold medal – first place	2011 Guadalajara	400m T12
Silver medal – second place	2011 Guadalajara	800m T12

Thierb da Costa Siqueira (born 12 February 1990) is a Brazilian sprinter.

Siqueria represented Brazil at the 2011 Parapan American Games, winning two gold medals and one silver medal. Siqueria also represented Brazil at the 2012 Summer Paralympics.
