= Lebanon at the 2008 Summer Paralympics =

- IPC code: LIB
- NPC: Lebanese Paralympic Committee

in Beijing
- Competitors: 1 in 1 sport
- Flag bearer: Edward Maalouf
- Medals Ranked 68th: Gold 0 Silver 0 Bronze 2 Total 2

Summer Paralympics appearances (overview)
- 2000; 2004; 2008; 2012; 2016; 2020; 2024

Lebanon sent a delegation to compete at the 2008 Summer Paralympics in Beijing, People's Republic of China.

== Medallists ==
The country won two medals, both bronze.

| Medal | Name | Sport | Event |
|---|---|---|---|
| Bronze | Edward Maalouf | Cycling | Men's Individual Road Race HC B |
| Bronze | Edward Maalouf | Cycling | Men's Individual Time Trial HC B |

== Sports ==
=== Cycling ===
==== Men's road ====
| Athlete | Event | Time | Rank |
|---|---|---|---|
| Edward Maalouf | Men's road race HC B | 1:28.26 | 3rd place, bronze medalist(s) |
| Edward Maalouf | Men's road time trial HC B | 22:12.91 | 3rd place, bronze medalist(s) |

== See also ==
- Lebanon at the Paralympics
- Lebanon at the 2008 Summer Olympics
