= Daniel Chalifour =

Canadian Paralympic cyclist

Personal information
- Born: 9 December 1971 (age 54) Saint Jérôme, Canada

Sport
- Country: Canada
- Sport: Paralympic cycling
- Disability: Stargardt's disease
Medal record
Paralympic cycling
Representing Canada
Parapan American Games
Gold medal – first place	2011 Guadalajara	Individual pursuit B
Gold medal – first place	2015 Toronto	Road time trial B
Gold medal – first place	2015 Toronto	Individual pursuit B
Gold medal – first place	2015 Toronto	1km time trial B
Silver medal – second place	2011 Guadalajara	1km time trial B
Silver medal – second place	2015 Toronto	Road race B
Bronze medal – third place	2011 Guadalajara	Road time trial B
Bronze medal – third place	2011 Guadalajara	Road race B
World Track Championships
Bronze medal – third place	2016 Montichiari	Individual pursuit B

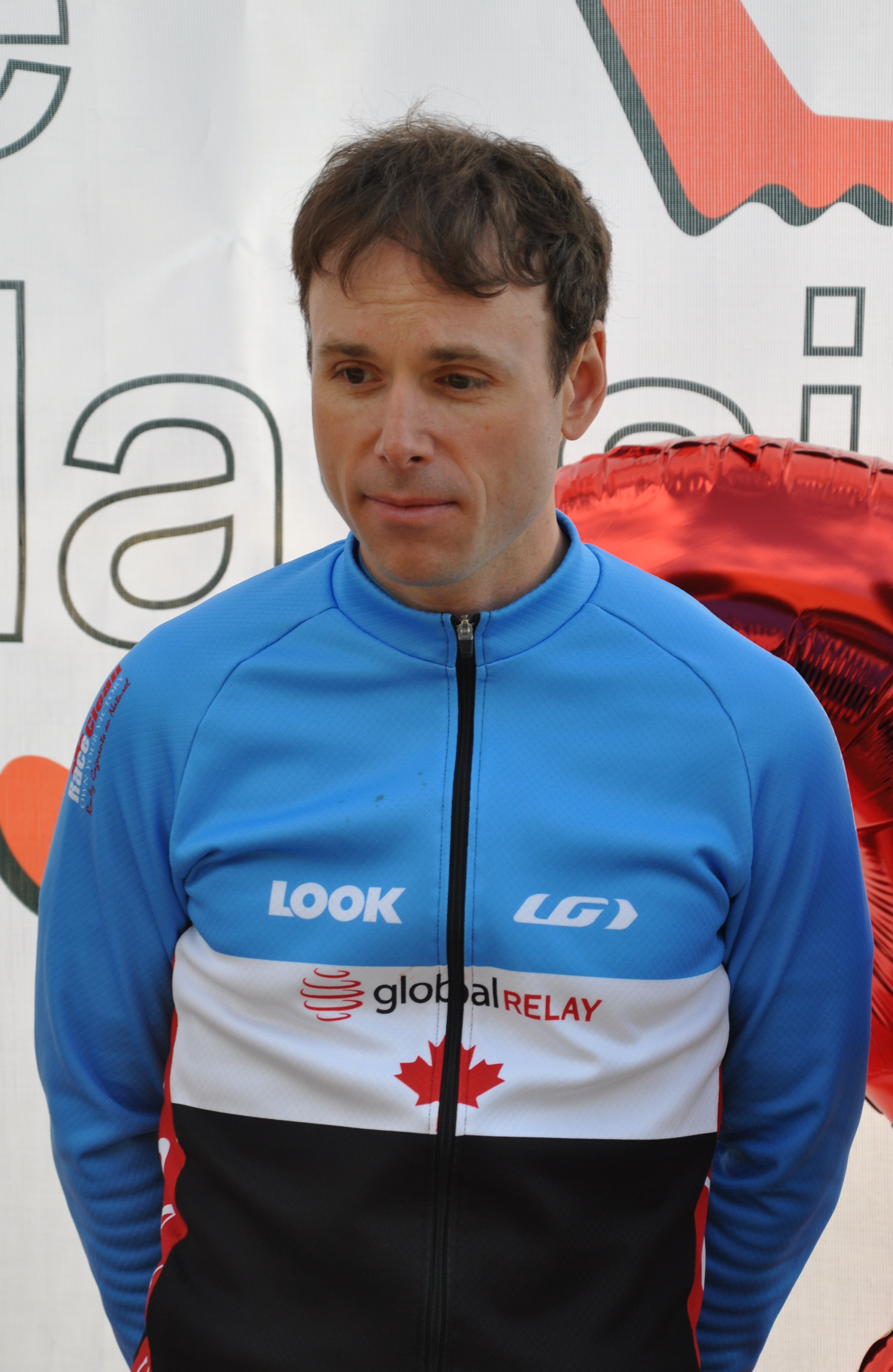
Chalifur at the Para-cycling German championships and Europe Cup 2016

Daniel Chalifour (born 9 December 1971) is a Canadian Paralympic cyclist who competed at international elite competitions. He was a four-time Parapan American Games champion and a World bronze medalist. He has competed at the Paralympic Games three times, he has narrowly missed a bronze medal at the 2008 Summer Paralympics in the individual pursuit and 2012 Summer Paralympics in the road time trial respectively.
