= Tara Profitt =

American Paralympic table tennis player

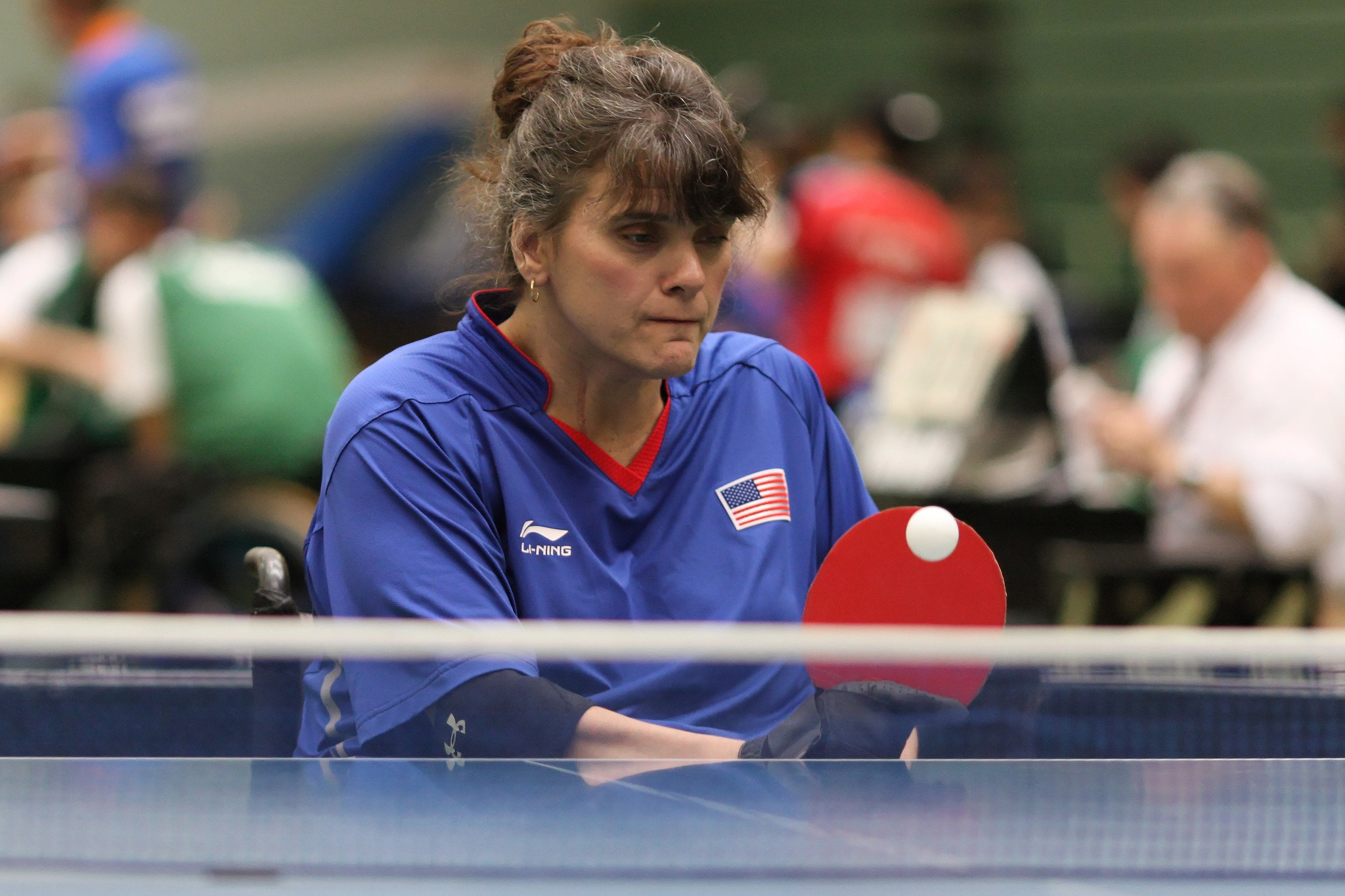
- Profitt at the 2012 Slovenia Open

Personal information
- Nationality: United States
- Born: July 26, 1965 (age 60) Apollo Beach, Florida, United States
- Height: 5 ft 9 in (1.75 m)

Sport
- Sport: Table tennis
Medal record
Table tennis
Parapan American Games
| Silver medal – second place | 2011 Guadalajara | Women's doubles C1-3 |
Pan American Championships
| Gold medal – first place | 2009 Margarita Island | Teams C1-3 |

Tara Profitt (born July 26, 1965) is an American Paralympic table tennis player who won a gold medal at the 2009 ParaPan American Championships and a silver medal at the 2011 Parapan American Games in the women's doubles alongside Pamela Fontaine and was fourth place during the women's singles at the same championships. Currently, she attends Wright State University and is married to Clyde.

Profitt competed at the 2012 Summer Paralympics in London, United Kingdom, 28 years after her previous Paralympic appearance at the 1984 Games.
