= Uruguay at the 2011 Parapan American Games =

Sporting event delegation

Uruguay will participate in the 2011 Parapan American Games.

== Athletics ==
Uruguay will send one male athletes to compete.

== Football 5-a-side ==
Uruguay will send a team of ten athletes to compete.

== Swimming ==
Uruguay will send three male swimmers to compete.

== Wheelchair tennis ==
Uruguay will send one male athlete to compete.

== See also ==
- Uruguay at the 2011 Pan American Games
- Uruguay at the 2012 Summer Paralympics
