= Lebanon at the 2000 Summer Paralympics =

- IPC code: LIB
- NPC: Lebanese Paralympic Committee

in Sydney
- Competitors: 2 in 1 sport
- Medals: Gold 0 Silver 0 Bronze 0 Total 0

Summer Paralympics appearances (overview)
- 2000; 2004; 2008; 2012; 2016; 2020; 2024

There were 0 female and 2 male athletes representing the country at the 2000 Summer Paralympics. Both of them competed in athletics.

== See also ==
- 2000 Summer Paralympics

== Bibliography ==
- International Paralympic Committee (2000). "Appendix C: Athlete Numbers - By Delegation". Sydney 2000 Paralympic Games Post Games Report. Sydney.
