= Haki Doku =

Albanian para-cyclist

Personal information
- Full name: Haki Doku
- Nationality: Italy Albania
- Born: 18 June 1969 (age 57) Krujë, Albania

Haki Doku (born 18 June 1969) in Krujë is an Albanian para-cyclist.

Doku became the first athlete to represent Albania at the Paralympic Games when he competed in the Men's road race H2 and the Men's road time trial H2 at the 2012 Summer Paralympics.

As he was the only competitor from the European nation he was also the flag bearer at the opening and closing ceremonies.

== Paralympic Games London 2012 ==
Haki Doku is the first Albanian athlete in the history of the Paralympics. He competed in London on his hand-bike, a special, three-wheeled bike driven by force of arms. Haki Doku is the first athlete in the Land of the Eagles to compete in the Paralympic Games.

== Guinness World Records ==
Haki Doku has achieved several Guinness World Records as a way to support foundations for disabled children.

- The Guinness World Record for the greatest distance travelled by manual wheelchair in 12 hours is 121 km (75.19 miles) and was achieved by Haki Doku on 16 May 2015. Doku was partially accompanied by a seven year old with Cerebral palsy named Guido Severgini, using a walking frame.
- The most stairs descended in a wheelchair in one hour is 2,917 and was achieved by Haki Doku in Seoul, South Korea, on 27 March 2019. Haki Doku attempted this record in order to beat his previous record of 2,564 stairs.
- The most stairs descended in a wheelchair in 12 hours is 12,000 stairs and was achieved by Haki Doku in Frankfurt, Germany on 24 September 2023.

== Personal life ==
Doku suffered spinal cord injuries in an accident in 1997. Doku resides in Milan, Italy with wife Enora and his two children, Mario and Alissa.
