= Robin Theryoung =

American goalballer

Personal information
- Full name: Robin Carol Theryoung
- Born: November 11, 1978 (age 47) Southfield, Michigan, U.S.

Sport
- Country: United States
- Sport: Goalball
Medal record
Women's goalball
Representing the United States
Paralympic Games
Gold medal – first place	2008 Beijing	Team
Silver medal – second place	2004 Athens	Team
Parapan American Games
Gold medal – first place	2011 Guadalajara	Team

Robin Theryoung (born November 11, 1978, in Southfield, Michigan) is an American goalballer. She has been on medal-winning teams since the World Goalball Championships in 1998, where she shared a bronze medal. She has a master's degree in Blind Rehabilitation from Western Michigan University. Her vision is blurred due to albinism.

== Education ==
Theryoung holds a Master's degree in Blindness and Low Vision studies from the Western Michigan University.

== See also ==
- United States women's national goalball team
- 2012 Summer Paralympics roster
