= Walter Ablinger =

Austrian para-cyclist (born 1969)

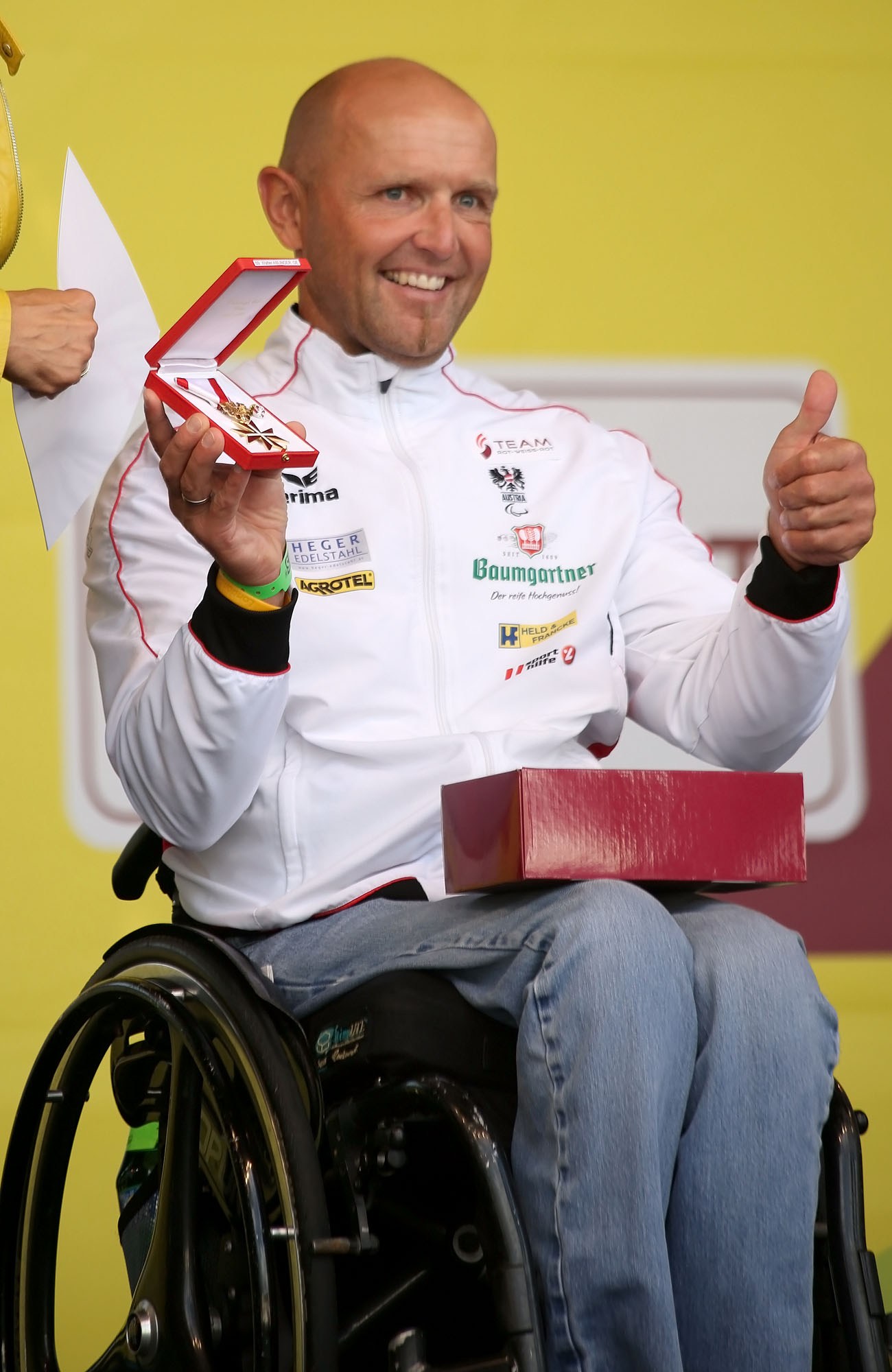
- Ablinger in 2013

Personal information
- Nationality: Austrian
- Born: 12 May 1969 (age 57) Schärding, Austria

Sport
- Sport: Para-cycling
- Disability class: H3
- Club: RSC Heindl OO
- Coached by: Christoph Etzlstorfer
Medal record
Men's Para-cycling
Representing Austria
Paralympic Games
Gold medal – first place	2012 London	Road race H2
Gold medal – first place	2020 Tokyo	Road time trial H3
Silver medal – second place	2012 London	Road time trial H2
Silver medal – second place	2016 Rio de Janeiro	Road time trial H3

Walter Ablinger (born 12 May 1969) is an Austrian Para-cyclist who represented Austria at the Paralympic Games.

== Career ==
Ablinger represented Austria at the 2012 Summer Paralympics winning a gold medal in the men's road race H2 event and a silver medal in the men's road time trial H2 event. He then won a silver medal in the men's road time trial H3 event at the 2016 Summer Paralympics. Ablinger won a gold medal in the men's road time trial H3 event at the 2020 Summer Paralympics.
