= Ahmed Shafik (powerlifter) =

American Paralympic powerlifter

Personal information
- Born: November 10, 1973 (age 52) Baghdad, Iraq
- Height: 1.68 m (5 ft 6 in)

Sport
- Country: United States
- Sport: Paralympic powerlifting
- Disability: Polio survivor
Medal record
Paralympic powerlifting
Representing United States
Parapan American Games
Silver medal – second place	2019 Lima	88kg & 97kg
Bronze medal – third place	2011 Guadalajara	Super heavyweight

Ahmed Shafik (born November 10, 1973 in Baghdad, Iraq) is an American Paralympic powerlifter of Iraqi descent who represented the 2012 and 2016 Summer Paralympics. His father Abdul Shafik is a retired weightlifter who competed for the Iraq national weightlifting team.

== Personal life ==
Shafik was born and brought up in Baghdad. When he was three years old, he developed an ear infection, a high fever and a weakening immune system, the doctor gave him a polio vaccine but it permanently affected the use of his left leg which resulted in muscle atrophy. He wanted to become his father, Abdul Shafik, who was a weightlifter in the Iraq national weightlifting team but due to his Ahmed's disability, he was unable to fulfil his dream of becoming an Olympic weightlifter. At the age of fifteen, Ahmed was introduced to Paralympic powerlifting however the gym where the powerlifters were based was over 50 miles away and Shafik had to endure cycling to and from the gym.

In 1998, Shafik made his debut international appearance at the World Para Powerlifting Championships representing Iraq and finished in fifth place. Even though it was a great result for him, it was not satisfying for the Iraq National Olympic Committee, the powerlifting team including Shafik were put into prison for 14 months under Saddam Hussein's regime whose son Uday Hussein was the ambassador of the country's committee. He sought refuge in the United States in 2001, this opportunity guided him to compete in the United States' Para Powerlifting team. He joined the US Army and was deployed in the Iraq War for two years.
