= Greta Neimanas =

American Paralympic cyclist (born 1988)

Personal information
- Born: May 4, 1988 (age 38) Evanston, Illinois, United States

Cycling career
- Sport: Cycling
Medal record
Representing United States
Athletics
Para-cycling Track World Championships
Gold medal – first place	2008	Women's time trial
Gold medal – first place	2012 Carson	Women's scratch race
Silver medal – second place	2009 Manchester	Women's time trial
Silver medal – second place	2009 Manchester	Women's pursuit
Silver medal – second place	2011 Montichiari	Women's pursuit
Silver medal – second place	2012 Carson	Women's pursuit
Silver medal – second place	2012 Carson	Women's time trial
Bronze medal – third place	2010	Women's time trial
Bronze medal – third place	2011 Montichiari	Women's time trial
Parapan American Games
Gold medal – first place	2011 Guadalajara	Women's road race
Silver medal – second place	2011 Guadalajara	500m time trial
Silver medal – second place	2011 Guadalajara	Individual pursuit

Greta Neimanas (born 4 May 1988) is an American Paralympic cyclist.

== Biography ==
Neimanas was born in Evanston, Illinois. Her passion for cycling was born when she saw cycling track at the 2004 Summer Paralympics in Athens, Greece at the age of 16. There she entered an essay contest the theme of which was "What Ability Means to Me". In 2006, she became a United States Olympic Training Center athlete at the Colorado Springs. She won gold medals at both 2008 and 2012 UCI Para-cycling Track World Championships for cycling time trial and for the same sport won bronze medals in 2010 and 2011 at the same place. She also won 5 silver medals for her 2009, 2011, and 2012 cycling pursuits and for 2009 and 2012 time trials. From March 22 to March 25 she was a participant of the Redlands Bicycle Classic in a criterium race and on April 28 she did Devil's Punch Bowl Road Race. From June 21 to June 23 of the same year she participated at the 2012 USA Cycling Juniors for both criterium and road race and from June 28 to June 30 of 2012 did both the criterium and omnium race of the Tour of Americas Dairyland.
