= Anna Johannes =

American Paralympic swimmer (born 1993)

Personal information
- Nationality: United States
- Born: August 12, 1993 (age 32) Bishkek, Kyrgyzstan
- Height: 5 ft 4 in (1.63 m)
- Weight: 125 lb (57 kg)

Sport
- Sport: Swimming
- Strokes: Backstroke, breaststroke, butterfly, freestyle
- Classifications: S9
Medal record
Athletics
Paralympic Games
Bronze medal – third place	2012 London	Women's 4x100m medley relay
World Championships
Bronze medal – third place	2013 Montreal	Women's 4x100m freestyle relay
Parapan American Games
Gold medal – first place	2011 Guadalajara	Women's 100 metre backstroke S9
Gold medal – first place	2011 Guadalajara	Women's 100 metre breaststroke SB9
Gold medal – first place	2011 Guadalajara	Women's 100 metre freestyle S9
Gold medal – first place	2011 Guadalajara	Women's 100 metre butterfly S9
Gold medal – first place	2011 Guadalajara	Women's 400 metre freestyle S9
Silver medal – second place	2011 Guadalajara	Women's 50 metre freestyle S9

Anna Johannes (born August 12, 1993) is a Kyrgyzstani-born American Paralympic swimmer.

== Biography ==
Johannes was born in Bishkek, Kyrgyzstan with Amniotic band syndrome. At age 2 she already started jumping into a pool and by the time she turned 6 she joined a local swimming team for able bodied children. At age nine she joined the Olympics but didn't started competing for it till 2011 when she won gold in 100m butterfly, backstroke, breaststroke and freestyle swimming. At the same Parapan American Games she won the same kind of medal for 400 metres (1,300 ft) freestyle and silver one for 50m freestyle. During the 2012 Summer Paralympics she won a bronze medal in 4 × 100 m medley, got 4th in 100 metre breaststroke and 5th in 200 metres (660 ft) individual medley. For a time she also held both the American and world records in 100 metre breaststroke and 200 metre individual medley.
