= Costa Rica at the 2011 Parapan American Games =

Sporting event delegation

Costa Rica participated in the 2011 Parapan American Games.

== Athletics ==
Costa Rica sent seven male athletes to compete.

== Cycling ==
Costa Rica sent six male athletes to compete. Three male athletes competed in the road cycling tournament, while three male athletes competed in the track cycling tournament.

== Powerlifting ==
Costa Rica sent one male athlete to compete.

== Sitting volleyball ==
Costa Rica sent a team of twelve athletes to compete.

== Table tennis ==
Costa Rica sent five male table tennis players to compete.

== See also ==
- Costa Rica at the 2011 Pan American Games
- Costa Rica at the 2012 Summer Paralympics
