= André Andrade (footballer) =

Brazilian footballer (born 1976)

Andre Andrade
Personal information
- Full name: Andre Luiz De Andrade Junior
- Date of birth: 11 February 1976 (age 50)
- Place of birth: Campinas, Brazil
- Position: Striker

Senior career*
Years	Team	Apps	(Gls)
1993–1995	Volta Redonda		
1996	Juventude		
1997–1998	Associação Desportiva Guarujá		
1999–2000	Real Piedimonte		
2001–2004	Mixto		
2004	Botafogo		
2005	Mixto	12	(9)
2005	Sorriso Esporte Clube	10	(5)
2006	Toronto Lynx	1	(0)
2006	Brampton Stallions	14	(7)
2007	Mixto		
2007–2008	Poços de Caldas Futebol Clube		
2009–2010	Rolim de Moura Esporte Clube		
- * Club domestic league appearances and goals

André Luiz Andrade Junior (born 11 February 1976 in Campinas) is a Brazilian footballer who played in the Campeonato Mato-Grossense, USL First Division, Canadian Soccer League, and the Campeonato Rondoniense.

== Playing career ==
Andrade had stints with clubs primarily from the Campeonato Matogrossense. Playing for clubs such as Sociedade Esportiva e Recreativa Juventude, Mixto Esporte Clube, and with Sorriso Esporte Clube. In 2006 Andre went abroad to Canada to sign with the Toronto Lynx of the USL First Division. His signing was announced on 9 May 2006 in a press conference where the Lynx introduced two more signings from Brazil. He made his debut for the Lynx against the Rochester Rhinos coming on as a substitute for David Diplacido. Unfortunately for Andrade his debut match would end up being his final appearance for Toronto. As he was deemed as surplus inn order to make room for new additional signings.

His contract was bought out by the Brampton Stallions of the Canadian Soccer League. He made his debut for the Stallions in a match against London City, where he recorded his first goal of the season in a 6–0 thrashing over City at home. He had a relatively successful tenure with Brampton, where he led that Stallions to five game undefeated streak and finished off the season as the second highest scorer for Brampton with seven goals. He helped the Brampton side clinch a playoff spot by finishing second in the National Division.

After his stint in Canada came to a conclusion, he returned to Brazil to have stints with Mixto, Poços de Caldas Futebol Clube, and Rolim de Moura Esporte Clube in the Campeonato Rondoniense.
