= Matthew Updike =

American Paralympic cyclist

Personal information
- Nickname: Matt Updike
- Born: Syracuse, New York, United States

Cycling career
- Sport: Cycling
Medal record
Representing United States
Cycling
US Road Cycling National Championships
Gold medal – first place	2011	Men's time trial
Gold medal – first place	2011	Men's road race
Paralympic Games
Gold medal – first place	2012 London	Men's team relay
Parapan American Games
Silver medal – second place	2011 Guadalajara	Men's mixed time trial
Silver medal – second place	2011 Guadalajara	Men's road race

Matthew Updike is an American Paralympic cyclist. In 2008 he competed for Beijing Paralympics but didn't win anything. He won two gold medals at the 2011 U.S. Paralympics Road Cycling National Championships for time trial and road race. The same year, he won two silver medals for mixed time trial and road race. At the 2012 Summer Paralympics in London, he won another gold for team relay.
