= El Salvador at the 2011 Parapan American Games =

Sporting event delegation

El Salvador will participate in the 2011 Parapan American Games.

== Athletics ==
El Salvador will send three male athletes to compete.

== Football 5-a-side ==
El Salvador will send a team of nine athletes to compete.

== Goalball ==
El Salvador will send two teams of six athletes each to compete in the men's and women's tournaments.

== Table tennis ==
El Salvador will send one male table tennis player to compete.

== Wheelchair basketball ==
El Salvador will send a team of twelve male athletes and a team of ten female athletes to compete in the men's and women's tournaments.

== Wheelchair tennis ==
El Salvador will send two male athletes to compete.

== See also ==
- El Salvador at the 2011 Pan American Games
- El Salvador at the 2012 Summer Paralympics
