= Edward Maalouf =

Lebanese Paralympic handcyclist

Medal record

Representing Lebanon

Men's Cycling

Paralympic Games
Bronze medal – third place	2008 Beijing	Time Trial HC B
Bronze medal – third place	2008 Beijing	Road Race HC B

World Championships
Silver medal – second place	2007 Bordeaux	Road Race

Asian Para Games
Silver medal – second place	2010 Guangzhou	Road Race
Bronze medal – third place	2010 Guangzhou	Time Trial
Silver medal – second place	2014 Incheon	Road Race
Silver medal – second place	2014 Incheon	Time Trial

Edward Maalouf (إدوارد معلوف; December 11, 1968 - October 2, 2026) was a Lebanese Paralympic handcyclist. He became the first athlete to win Paralympic medals for Lebanon after winning two bronze medals at the 2008 Summer Paralympics in Beijing. He represented Lebanon at the 2008 and 2012 Summer Paralympic Games as the country's sole qualified athlete and flag bearer at both Opening Ceremonies. Throughout his career, Maalouf won medals at the UCI Para-cycling Road World Championships and the Asian Para Games, claimed victory at the 2017 UCI Para-cycling Road World Cup in Ostend, won the European Handbike Circuit, and achieved victories in several international handcycle marathons, including the New York City Marathon.

== Early life and education ==
Edward Maalouf was born on December 11, 1968, in Hadath, Lebanon. He completed his Baccalaureate in Mathematics at Saint George School in Zalka, before studying Computer Science at ICT School.

Prior to his athletic career, Maalouf worked as a building contractor.

== Accident and rehabilitation ==
In 1995, while supervising construction work in Beirut, Maalouf fell from the sixth floor of a building, sustaining a spinal cord injury that left him paraplegic.

Following his rehabilitation, he turned to adaptive sports as part of his recovery, eventually specializing in handcycling.

== Career ==
Maalouf began competing internationally in handcycling in the early 2000s.

In 2006, he won the handcycle division of the New York City Marathon.

In 2007, he won a silver medal at the UCI Para-cycling Road World Championships in Bordeaux, France. Later that year, he captured the overall European Handbike Circuit title and won the Beirut Handcycle Marathon.

At the 2008 Summer Paralympics in Beijing, Maalouf was Lebanon's sole representative and served as the national flag bearer during the Opening Ceremony. He won bronze medals in both the Men's Individual Time Trial HC B and the Men's Individual Road Race HC B, becoming the first athlete in history to win Paralympic medals for Lebanon. Following the Games, he was diagnosed with a severe blood infection and required several months of hospital treatment before returning to competition.

At the 2010 Asian Para Games in Guangzhou, Maalouf won a silver medal in the road race and a bronze medal in the time trial.

He represented Lebanon again at the 2012 Summer Paralympics in London as the nation's sole competitor and flag bearer. He finished 9th in the men's H2 time trial and 12th in the men's H2 road race.

At the 2014 Asian Para Games in Incheon, he won two silver medals.

In 2017, Maalouf claimed victory at the UCI Para-cycling Road World Cup event in Ostend, Belgium.

Throughout his career, he has won numerous international handcycle marathons, including events in New York City, Hamburg, Düsseldorf, Berlin, and Beirut. Following his competitive career, he transitioned into coaching and mentoring adaptive athletes.

== Major achievements ==
- First athlete to win Paralympic medals for Lebanon.
- Two-time Paralympic bronze medalist (2008 Beijing).
- Lebanon's flag bearer at the 2008 and 2012 Summer Paralympics.
- Silver medalist at the UCI Para-cycling Road World Championships (2007).
- Four-time Asian Para Games medalist (2010, 2014).
- Winner at the 2017 UCI Para-cycling Road World Cup (Ostend).
- Overall winner of the European Handbike Circuit (2007).
- Winner of the New York City Handcycle Marathon (2006).

== Major international results ==
Competition	Year	Result
Paralympic Games	2008	(bronze) Time Trial (HC B); (bronze) Road Race (HC B)
Paralympic Games	2012	9th Time Trial (H2); 12th Road Race (H2)
World Championships	2007	(silver) Road Race
Asian Para Games	2010	(silver) Road Race; (bronze) Time Trial
Asian Para Games	2014	(silver) Road Race; (silver) Time Trial
UCI World Cup	2017	(gold) Ostend
European Handbike Circuit	2007	(gold) Overall Winner

== See also ==
- Lebanon at the Paralympics
