= Mexico at the 2011 Parapan American Games =

Sporting event delegation

Mexico participated in the 2011 Parapan American Games.

== Medalists ==
Medals by sport
Sport	1st place, gold medalist(s)	2nd place, silver medalist(s)	3rd place, bronze medalist(s)	Total
Athletics	20	30	30	80
Swimming	20	21	19	60
Powerlifting	4	2	0	6
Table tennis	3	4	4	11
Judo	1	2	0	3
Archery	1	0	0	1
Boccia	1	0	0	1
Cycling	0	1	1	2
Goalball	0	0	1	1
Total	50	60	55	165

Medal	Name	Sport	Event	Date
Gold	Vianney Trejo	Swimming	Women's 400m freestyle S6	November 13
Gold	Mariana Diaz de la Vega	Swimming	Women's 100m breaststroke SB14	November 13
Gold	Benjamín Iván Cardozo	Athletics	Men's long jump F37/38	November 14
Gold	Aaron Gordian	Athletics	Men's 5,000m T54	November 14
Gold	Gustavo Sánchez	Swimming	Men's 50m freestyle S4	November 14
Gold	Luis Andrade Guillen	Swimming	Men's 50m freestyle S8	November 14
Gold	Patricia Valle	Swimming	Women's 50m freestyle S3	November 14
Gold	Pedro Rangel	Swimming	Men's 100m breaststroke SB5	November 14
Gold	Vianney Trejo	Swimming	Women's 200m ind medley SM6	November 14
Gold	Salvador Hernández Mondragón	Athletics	Men's 100m T52	November 15
Gold	María de los Ángeles Ortíz	Athletics	Women's shot put F57/58	November 15
Gold	Mauro Máximo	Athletics	Men's javelin throw F52/53	November 15
Gold	Luis Alberto Zepeda	Athletics	Men's javelin throw F54/55/56	November 15
Gold	Doramitzi González	Swimming	Women's 50m freestyle S6	November 15
Gold	Vianney Trejo	Swimming	Women's 50m butterfly S6	November 15
Gold	María Paredes	Table tennis	Women's individual C5	November 15
Gold	Leslie Lizeth Mendoza	Athletics	Women's shot put F20	November 16
Gold	Fernando Sanchez Nava	Athletics	Men's 400 metres T54	November 16
Gold	Fernando del Rosario Gonzalez	Athletics	Men's discus throw F57/58	November 16
Gold	Eduardo Ventura	Boccia	Individual BC1	November 16
Gold	Enrique Perez	Swimming	Men's 50 metres freestyle S7	November 16
Gold	Arnulfo Castorena	Swimming	Men's 50 metres breaststroke SB2	November 16
Gold	Haidee Aceves Perez	Swimming	Women's 50 metres breaststroke SB2	November 16
Gold	Gustavo Sanchez	Swimming	Men's 50 metres breaststroke SB3	November 16
Gold	Jose Antonio Baez	Archery	Men's individual recurve W2/ST	November 17
Gold	Yazmith Bataz	Athletics	Women's 100 metres T54	November 17
Gold	Tania Lorena Jimenez	Athletics	Women's shot put F12	November 17
Gold	Alejandro Perez Torres	Athletics	Men's shot put F57/58	November 17
Gold	Salvador Hernandez Mondragon	Athletics	Men's 400 metres T52	November 17
Gold	Esther Rivera	Athletics	Women's javelin throw F52/53/33/34	November 17
Gold	Saul Mendoza Hernandez	Athletics	Men's 800 metres T54	November 17
Gold	Doramitzi Gonzalez	Swimming	Women's 100 metres freestyle S6	November 17
Gold	Luis Andrade Guillen	Swimming	Men's 200 metres individual medley SM8	November 17
Gold	Mauro Maximo de Jesus	Athletics	Men's shot put F52/53	November 18
Gold	Aaron Gordian Martinez	Athletics	Men's 1,500 metres T54	November 18
Gold	Edgar Ismael Barajas Barajas	Athletics	Men's javelin throw F42	November 18
Gold	Jeny Velazco Reyes	Athletics	Women's javelin throw F54-58	November 18
Gold	Amalia Perez	Powerlifting	Women's 44 kg - 60 kg	November 18
Gold	Porfirio Arredondo	Powerlifting	Men's 75 kg - 82.5 kg	November 18
Gold	Patricia Valle	Swimming	Women's 100 metres freestyle S3	November 18
Gold	Luis Andrade Guillen	Swimming	Men's 100 metres freestyle S8	November 18
Gold	Luis Andrade Guillen	Swimming	Men's 100 metres butterfly S8	November 18
Gold	Alma R. Padilla; Maria E. Sigala	Table tennis	Women's team C1-3	November 18
Gold	Maria T. Arenales; Maria Paredes; Martha A. Verdin	Table tennis	Women's team C4-5	November 18
Gold	Eduardo A. Avila	Judo	Men's 73 kg	November 19
Gold	Jose de Jesus Castillo	Powerlifting	Men's 90 kg - +100 kg	November 19
Gold	Perla Barcenas	Powerlifting	Women's 67.5 kg - +82.5 kg	November 19
Gold	Vianney Trejo	Swimming	Women's 100 metres backstroke S6	November 19
Gold	Arnulfo Castorena	Swimming	Men's 150 metres individual medley SM3	November 19
Gold	Aaron Gordian Martinez	Athletics	Men's marathon T54	November 20
Silver	Doramitzi González	Swimming	Women's 400m freestyle S6	November 13
Silver	Enrique Perez	Swimming	Men's 400m freestyle S7	November 13
Silver	Arturo Larraga	Swimming	Men's 100m butterfly S9	November 13
Silver	Juan Reyes; Arnulfo Castorena; Gustavo Sanchez; Luis Andrade Guillen	Swimming	Men's 4x50m freestyle relay	November 13
Silver	Pedro Marquez Jr. Villanueva	Athletics	Men's 100 metres T35	November 14
Silver	Alan Efrain Noriega Quinones	Athletics	Men's shot put F54/55/56	November 14
Silver	Josue Benitez Sandoval	Athletics	Men's 400 metres T44	November 14
Silver	Yazmith Bataz	Athletics	Women's 400 metres T54	November 14
Silver	Saul Mendoza Hernandez	Athletics	Men's 5,000 metres T54	November 14
Silver	Gloria Sanchez	Athletics	Women's 800 metres T54	November 14
Silver	Juan Reyes	Swimming	Men's 50 metres freestyle S4	November 14
Silver	Haidee Aceves Perez	Swimming	Women's 50 metres freestyle S3	November 14
Silver	Cristopher Tronco	Swimming	Men's 50 metres freestyle S3	November 14
Silver	Beatriz Resendiz	Swimming	Women's 200 metres freestyle S14	November 14
Silver	Karina Domingo Bello	Swimming	Women's 100 metres breaststroke SB6	November 14
Silver	Luis Andrade Guillen	Swimming	Men's 100 metres breaststroke SB8	November 14
Silver	Catalina Rosales Montiel	Athletics	Women's shot put F57/58	November 15
Silver	Jorge Benjamin Gonzalez Sauceda	Athletics	Men's 400 metres T12	November 15
Silver	Ivonne Reyes	Athletics	Women's 5,000 metres T54	November 15
Silver	Estela Salas	Athletics	Women's discus throw F51/52/53	November 15
Silver	Vianney Trejo	Swimming	Women's 50 metres freestyle S6	November 15
Silver	Sofia Olmos	Swimming	Women's 50 metres butterfly S5	November 15
Silver	Arturo Larraga; Luis Andrade Guillen; Enrique Perez; Angel Buitian Santiago	Swimming	Men's 4 x 100 metres Freestyle Relay 34 points	November 15
Silver	Maria T. Arenales	Table tennis	Women's singles C4	November 15
Silver	Victor E. Reyes	Table tennis	Men's singles C6	November 15
Silver	Miguel A. Vazquez	Table tennis	Men's singles C9	November 15
Silver	Rene G. Dominguez	Table tennis	Men's singles C10	November 15
Silver	Jorge Benjamin Gonzalez Sauceda	Athletics	Men's 200 metres T12	November 16
Silver	Yazmith Bataz	Athletics	Women's 200 metres T54	November 16
Silver	Mario Santillan Hernandez	Athletics	Men's 1,500 metres T46	November 16
Silver	Cristopher Tronco	Swimming	Men's 50 metres breaststroke SB2	November 16
Silver	Fabiola Ramirez	Swimming	Women's 50 metres breaststroke SB2	November 16
Silver	Josue Benitez Sandoval	Athletics	Men's long jump F44	November 17
Silver	Pedro Marquez Jr. Villanueva	Athletics	Men's 200 metres T35	November 17
Silver	Evelyn Enciso	Athletics	Women's 200 metres T53	November 17
Silver	Jose Armando Aranda Balan	Athletics	Men's shot put F57/58	November 17
Silver	Daniela Eugenia Velasco	Athletics	Women's 400 metres T12	November 17
Silver	Jorge Alberto Madrigal Badillo	Athletics	Men's discus throw F42	November 17
Silver	Maria de los Angeles Ortiz	Athletics	Women's discus throw F57/58	November 17
Silver	Estela Salas	Athletics	Women's javelin throw F52/53/33/34	November 17
Silver	Vianney Trejo	Swimming	Women's 100 metres freestyle S6	November 17
Silver	Salvador Hernandez Mondragon	Athletics	Men's 200 metres T52	November 18
Silver	Evelyn Enciso	Athletics	Women's 400 metres T53	November 18
Silver	Luis Zapien Rosas	Athletics	Men's 5,000 metres T11	November 18
Silver	Saul Mendoza Hernandez	Athletics	Men's 1,500 metres T54	November 18
Silver	Ivonne Reyes	Athletics	Women's 1,500 metres T54	November 18
Silver	Norberto Manuel Zertuche Rodriguez	Athletics	Men's discus throw F35/36	November 18
Silver	Jorge Alberto Madrigal Badillo	Athletics	Men's javelin throw F42	November 18
Silver	Fernando del Rosario Gonzalez	Athletics	Men's javelin throw F57/58	November 18
Silver	Lenia Ruvalcaba	Judo	Women's 70 kg	November 18
Silver	Alejandro González	Judo	Men's 90 kg	November 18
Silver	Laura Cerero	Powerlifting	Women's 44 kg - 60 kg	November 18
Silver	Haidee Aceves Perez	Swimming	Women's 100 metres freestyle S3	November 18
Silver	Angel Buitian Santiago	Swimming	Men's 100 metres butterfly S8	November 18
Silver	Ivonne Reyes	Cycling	Women's road race H3-4	November 19
Silver	Catalina Diaz	Powerlifting	Women's 67.5 kg - +82.5 kg	November 19
Silver	Arturo Larraga	Swimming	Men's 100 metres freestyle S9	November 19
Silver	Doramitzi Gonzalez	Swimming	Women's 100 metres backstroke S6	November 19
Silver	Cristopher Tronco	Swimming	Men's 150 metres individual medley SM3	November 19
Silver	Saul Mendoza Hernandez	Athletics	Men's marathon T54	November 20
Bronze	Karina Domingo Bello	Swimming	Women's 400m freestyle S6	November 13
Bronze	Norberto Manuel Zertuche Rodriguez	Athletics	Men's 100 metres T36	November 14
Bronze	Martin Velasco Soria	Athletics	Men's 5,000 metres T54	November 14
Bronze	Mario Santillan Hernandez	Athletics	Men's 800 metres T46	November 14
Bronze	Miguel Angel Mijangos Velazquez	Athletics	Men's 800 metres T53	November 14
Bronze	Luis Burgos Godinez	Swimming	Men's 50 metres freestyle S3	November 14
Bronze	Alejandro Silva	Swimming	Men's 100 metres breaststroke SB5	November 14
Bronze	Sofia Olmos	Swimming	Women's 200 metres individual medley SM5	November 14
Bronze	Karina Domingo Bello	Swimming	Women's 200 metres individual medley SM6	November 14
Bronze	Jorge Benjamin Gonzalez Sauceda	Athletics	Men's 100 metres T12	November 15
Bronze	Daniela Eugenia Velasco	Athletics	Women's 100 metres T12	November 15
Bronze	Benjamin Ivan Cardozo Sanchez	Athletics	Men's 100 metres T37	November 15
Bronze	Fatima del Rocio Perez Garcia	Athletics	Women's 200 metres T38	November 15
Bronze	Daniel Ramirez Avila	Athletics	Men's 5,000 metres T12	November 15
Bronze	Juan Varela Osorio	Athletics	Men's javelin throw F54/55/56	November 15
Bronze	Juan Reyes	Swimming	Men's 50 metres butterfly S5	November 15
Bronze	Maria E. Sigala	Table tennis	Women's singles C1-3	November 15
Bronze	Martha A. Verdin	Table tennis	Women's singles C4	November 15
Bronze	Gloria Sanchez	Athletics	Women's 200 metres T54	November 16
Bronze	Veronica Azucena Saucedo	Athletics	Women's shot put F54/55/56	November 16
Bronze	Rafael Olmedo Gongora	Athletics	Men's 800 metres T36	November 16
Bronze	Arturo Larraga	Swimming	Men's 400 metres freestyle S9	November 16
Bronze	Omar Osario Salazar	Swimming	Men's 50 metres breaststroke SB3	November 16
Bronze	Mariana Diaz de la Vega	Swimming	Women's 100 metres backstroke S14	November 16
Bronze	Fatima del Rocio Perez Garcia	Athletics	Women's 100 metres T38	November 17
Bronze	Fernando del Rosario Gonzalez	Athletics	Men's shot put F57/58	November 17
Bronze	Maria de Jesus Reyes Alonso	Athletics	Women's 400 metres T12	November 17
Bronze	Martin Velasco Soria	Athletics	Men's 800 metres T54	November 17
Bronze	Nely Miranda Herrera	Swimming	Women's 50 metres freestyle S5	November 17
Bronze	Karina Domingo Bello	Swimming	Women's 100 metres freestyle S6	November 17
Bronze	Sandra Fonseca Solis	Athletics	Women's 100 metres T36	November 18
Bronze	Casandra Guadalupe Cruz	Athletics	Women's 200 metres T11	November 18
Bronze	Daniela Eugenia Velasco	Athletics	Women's 200 metres T12	November 18
Bronze	Benjamin Ivan Cardozo Sanchez	Athletics	Men's 200 metres T37	November 18
Bronze	Fernando Sanchez Nava	Athletics	Men's 200 metres T54	November 18
Bronze	Juan Carlos Arcos Lira	Athletics	Men's 400 metres T13	November 18
Bronze	Rafael Olmedo Gongora	Athletics	Men's 400 metres T36	November 18
Bronze	Juan Carlos Arcos Lira	Athletics	Men's 1,500 metres T13	November 18
Bronze	Martin Velasco Soria	Athletics	Men's 1,500 metres T54	November 18
Bronze	Luis Enrique Jurado Mendez	Athletics	Men's javelin throw F42	November 18
Bronze	Dora Elia Garcia	Athletics	Women's javelin throw F54-58	November 18
Bronze	Juan Carlos Arcos Lira	Athletics	Men's 800 metres T13	November 18
Bronze	Nely Miranda Herrera	Swimming	Women's 100 metres freestyle S5	November 18
Bronze	Gustavo Sanchez	Swimming	Men's 100 metres freestyle S5	November 18
Bronze	Enrique Perez	Swimming	Men's 50 metres butterfly S7	November 18
Bronze	Juan Reyes	Swimming	Men's 50 metres backstroke S5	November 18
Bronze	Nadia Porras	Swimming	Women's 50 metres backstroke S5	November 18
Bronze	Jesus A. Sanchez; Gabriel Zaldivar	Table tennis	Men's team C1-3	November 18
Bronze	Rene G. Dominguez; Miguel A. Vazquez	Table tennis	Men's team C9-10	November 18
Bronze	Gonzalo Valdovinos	Cycling	Men's road race H2-4	November 19
Bronze	Team Mexico	Goalball	Men	November 19
Bronze	Gustavo Sanchez	Swimming	Men's 200 metres freestyle S5	November 19
Bronze	Nely Miranda Herrera	Swimming	Women's 200 metres freestyle S5	November 19
Bronze	Arturo Larraga; Luis Andrade Guillen; Angel Buitian Santiago; Enrique Perez	Swimming	Men's 4 x 100 metres Medley Relay 34 points	November 19
Bronze	Alfonso Zaragoza	Athletics	Men's marathon T54	November 20

== Archery ==
Mexico sent two male athletes to compete.

== Athletics ==
Mexico sent 43 male and 23 female athletes to compete.

== Boccia ==
Mexico sent eight male and two female athletes to compete.

== Cycling ==
Mexico sent five male and one female athlete to compete in the road cycling tournament.

== Football 5-a-side ==
Mexico sent a team of ten athletes to compete.

== Goalball ==
Mexico sent two teams of six athletes each to compete in the men's and women's tournaments.

== Judo ==
Mexico sent four male and three female athletes to compete.

== Powerlifting ==
Mexico sent seven male and six female athletes to compete.

== Sitting volleyball ==
Mexico sent a team of twelve athletes to compete.

== Swimming ==
Mexico sent fifteen male and seventeen female swimmers to compete.

== Table tennis ==
Mexico sent eight male and six female table tennis players to compete.

== Wheelchair basketball ==
Mexico sent two teams of twelve athletes each to compete in the men's and women's tournaments.

== Wheelchair tennis ==
Mexico sent two male and two female athletes to compete.

== See also ==
- Mexico at the 2011 Pan American Games
- Mexico at the 2012 Summer Paralympics
