= Powerlifting at the 2015 Parapan American Games =

The powerlifting event at the 2015 Parapan American Games was held from 8–11 August 2015 at the Mississauga Sports Centre in Mississauga.

== Medal summary ==
=== Medal table ===
Rank	Nation	Gold	Silver	Bronze	Total
1	Mexico (MEX)	3	4	2	9
2	Brazil (BRA)	3	1	4	8
3	Cuba (CUB)	3	1	1	5
4	Chile (CHI)	2	1	2	5
5	Colombia (COL)	1	4	1	6
6	Venezuela (VEN)	0	1	0	1
7	Nicaragua (NIC)	0	0	1	1
Totals (7 entries)		12	12	11	35

=== Medal events ===
==== Men ====
Event	Gold	Silver	Bronze
49–54 kg	Jorge Carinao Cárdenas; Chile; AR	César Rubio Guerra; Cuba	Luciano Bezerra Dantas; Brazil
59 kg	Juan Garrido Acevedo; Chile; PR	Bruno Pinheiro Carra; Brazil	Yoander Arias; Cuba
65 kg	Danilo Rodríguez García; Cuba; PR	Andrés Salazar Herrera; Colombia	Alexsander Whitaker; Brazil
72 kg	Jainer Cantillo; Colombia; PR	Javier Montenegro; Colombia	Fernando Acevedo Gonzalez; Nicaragua
80 kg	Evânio Rodrigues da Silva; Brazil; PR	Porfirio Arredondo; Mexico	Francisco Palomeque; Colombia
88 kg	Jesús Oniger Drake Vega; Cuba; PR	Cesar Campo; Venezuela	Rodrigo De Rosa De Carvalho; Brazil
97 kg	José Castillo Castillo; Mexico; PR	Fabio Torres; Colombia	Franck Feliu Ubillas; Chile
107 kg & +107 kg	Joseano Felipe; Brazil; PR	Cristian Aguirre Mora; Chile	none awarded

==== Women ====
Event	Gold	Silver	Bronze
41 kg & 45 kg	Leydis Rodriguez; Cuba; AR	Laura Cerero; Mexico	Mayra Godinez Hernandez; Mexico
50 kg	Maria Rizonaide; Brazil; PR	Nohemí Carabalí; Colombia	Rosaura Rodriguez Padilla. Mexico
55-61-67 kg	Amalia Pérez; Mexico; WR	Miriam Aguilar Jimenez; Mexico	Camila Campos Dominguez. Chile
73, 79, 86 and +86 kg	Perla Bárcenas; Mexico; PR	Catalína Diaz Vilchis; Mexico	Márcia Menezes; Brazil
