= Venezuela at the 2011 Parapan American Games =

Sporting event delegation

Venezuela will participate in the 2011 Parapan American Games.

== Medalists ==
Medals by sport
Sport	1st place, gold medalist(s)	2nd place, silver medalist(s)	3rd place, bronze medalist(s)	Total
Athletics	12	9	9	30
Swimming	4	3	2	9
Table tennis	0	2	1	3
Judo	0	0	5	5
Powerlifting	0	0	1	1
Total	16	14	18	48

Medal	Name	Sport	Event	Date
Gold	Alberto Vera Moran	Swimming	Men's 100 metres breaststroke SB14	November 13
Gold	Danyelo Hernandez	Athletics	Men's shot put F20	November 14
Gold	Omar Monterola	Athletics	Men's 400 metres T38	November 14
Gold	Samuel Colmenares	Athletics	Men's 800 metres T46	November 14
Gold	Jesus Aguilar	Athletics	Men's 800 metres T53	November 14
Gold	Belkys Mota	Swimming	Women's 50 metres freestyle S12	November 14
Gold	Alberto Vera Moran	Swimming	Men's 200 metres freestyle S14	November 14
Gold	Yoldani Silva	Athletics	Men's 100 metres T12	November 15
Gold	Omar Monterola	Athletics	Men's 100 metres T37	November 15
Gold	Rene Rafael Norono Verdejo	Athletics	Men's 1,500 metres T20	November 16
Gold	Omar Monterola	Athletics	Men's 200 metres T37	November 18
Gold	Juan Valladares	Athletics	Men's 200 metres T54	November 18
Gold	Samuel Colmenares	Athletics	Men's 400 metres T46	November 18
Gold	Jesus Aguilar	Athletics	Men's 400 metres T53	November 18
Gold	Jose Luis Sanchez	Athletics	Men's 800 metres T13	November 18
Gold	Belkys Mota	Swimming	Women's 100 metres freestyle S12	November 19
Silver	Wuillian Briceno	Athletics	Men's 800 metres T46	November 14
Silver	Pedro Gonzalez Valdiviezo	Swimming	Men's 50 metres freestyle S12	November 14
Silver	Vargas L. Argenis R.	Athletics	Men's 100 metres T12	November 15
Silver	Jesus Aguilar	Athletics	Men's 100 metres T53	November 15
Silver	Yomaira Cohen	Athletics	Women's javelin throw F37/38	November 15
Silver	Denisos J. Martinez	Table tennis	Men's singles C11	November 15
Silver	Zulay Colmenares	Table tennis	Women's singles C11	November 15
Silver	Eddy Guerrero	Athletics	Women's shot put F20	November 16
Silver	Juan Valladares	Athletics	Men's 400 metres T54	November 16
Silver	Jovito Gutierrez	Athletics	Men's 1,500 metres T20	November 16
Silver	Alberto Vera Moran	Swimming	Men's 100 metres backstroke S14	November 16
Silver	Jesus Aguilar	Athletics	Men's 200 metres T53	November 17
Silver	Yuclesy Pinto	Athletics	Women's shot put F12	November 17
Silver	Pedro Gonzalez Valdiviezo	Swimming	Men's 100 metres freestyle S12	November 19
Bronze	Viviana Moraes Barreto	Swimming	Women's 100 metres breaststroke SB14	November 13
Bronze	Vargas L. Argenis R.	Athletics	Men's 400 metres T12	November 15
Bronze	Belkys Mota	Swimming	Women's 100 metres breaststroke SB12	November 15
Bronze	Edson Gomez	Table tennis	Men's singles C4	November 15
Bronze	Yadira Soturno	Athletics	Women's 100 metres T53	November 16
Bronze	Anibal Bello	Athletics	Men's shot put F12	November 16
Bronze	Wuillian Briceno	Athletics	Men's 1,500 metres T46	November 16
Bronze	Samuel Colmenares	Athletics	Men's 200 metres T46	November 17
Bronze	Yadira Soturno	Athletics	Women's 200 metres T53	November 17
Bronze	Marcos Castillo	Athletics	Men's 400 metres T52	November 17
Bronze	Yadira Soturno	Athletics	Women's 400 metres T53	November 18
Bronze	Roger Rodriguez	Athletics	Men's 800 metres T12	November 18
Bronze	Hector Espinoza	Judo	Men's 90 kg	November 18
Bronze	William Montero	Judo	Men's +100 kg	November 18
Bronze	Wiunawis Hernandez	Powerlifting	Women's 44 kg - 60 kg	November 18
Bronze	Mauricio Briceño	Judo	Men's 73 kg	November 19
Bronze	Reinaldo Carvallo	Judo	Men's 81 kg	November 19
Bronze	Marcos Falcon	Judo	Men's 66 kg	November 20

== Archery ==
Venezuela will send one male athlete to compete.

== Athletics ==
Venezuela will send 41 male and 9 female athletes to compete.

== Boccia ==
Venezuela will send seven male athletes to compete.

== Cycling ==
Venezuela will send five male athletes to compete. Three male athletes will compete in the road cycling tournament, while two male athletes will compete in the track cycling tournament.

== Judo ==
Venezuela will send six male and two female athletes to compete.

== Powerlifting ==
Venezuela will send five male and four female athletes to compete.

== Swimming ==
Venezuela will send eleven male and six female swimmers to compete.

== Table tennis ==
Venezuela will send seven male and three female table tennis players to compete.

== See also ==
- Venezuela at the 2011 Pan American Games
- Venezuela at the 2012 Summer Paralympics
