= Argentina at the 2011 Parapan American Games =

Sporting event delegation

Argentina participated in the 2011 Parapan American Games.

== Medalists ==
Medals by sport
| Sport | 1st place, gold medalist(s) | 2nd place, silver medalist(s) | 3rd place, bronze medalist(s) | Total |
| Athletics | 8 | 8 | 7 | 23 |
| Swimming | 6 | 9 | 14 | 29 |
| Table tennis | 2 | 2 | 4 | 8 |
| Wheelchair tennis | 1 | 2 | 0 | 3 |
| Cycling | 1 | 1 | 3 | 5 |
| Judo | 1 | 0 | 3 | 4 |
| Boccia | 0 | 2 | 0 | 2 |
| Football 5-a-side | 0 | 1 | 0 | 1 |
| Total | 19 | 25 | 31 | 75 |

| Medal | Name | Sport | Event | Date |
|---|---|---|---|---|
| Gold | Marco Pulleiro | Swimming | Men's 100 metres butterfly S9 | November 13 |
| Gold | Sergio Zayas | Swimming | Men's 100 metres backstroke S11 | November 13 |
| Gold | Hernan Barreto | Athletics | Men's 100 metres T35 | November 14 |
| Gold | Sebastian Baldassarri | Athletics | Men's discus throw F11 | November 14 |
| Gold | Leandro Ricci | Athletics | Men's discus throw F37/38 | November 14 |
| Gold | Daniela Gimenez | Swimming | Women's 100 metres breaststroke SB9 | November 14 |
| Gold | Nadia Schaus | Athletics | Women's 200 metres T36 | November 15 |
| Gold | Rodrigo Lopez | Cycling | Men's 1,000 metres track time trial C1-5 | November 15 |
| Gold | Daniela Gimenez | Swimming | Women's 50 metres freestyle S9 | November 15 |
| Gold | Anabel Moro | Swimming | Women's 100 metres breaststroke SB12 | November 15 |
| Gold | Gabriel Copola | Table tennis | Men's singles C3 | November 15 |
| Gold | Lucas Ezequiel Schonfeld | Athletics | Men's high jump F46 | November 17 |
| Gold | Hernan Barreto | Athletics | Men's 200 metres T35 | November 17 |
| Gold | Mariano Domínguez | Athletics | Men's 800 metres T37 | November 17 |
| Gold | Nadia Schaus | Athletics | Women's 100 metres T36 | November 18 |
| Gold | Gonzalo Acosta; Gabriel Copola; Mauro Depergola; Ernesto Rodriguez | Table tennis | Men's team C4-5 | November 18 |
| Gold | Gustavo Fernandez | Wheelchair tennis | Men's singles | November 18 |
| Gold | José Effron | Judo | Men's 81 kg | November 19 |
| Gold | Guillermo Marro | Swimming | Men's 100 metres backstroke S7 | November 19 |
| Silver | Ignacio Gonzalez | Swimming | Men's 200 metres individual medley SM12 | November 13 |
| Silver | Daniel Tataren | Athletics | Men's long jump F37/38 | November 14 |
| Silver | Anabel Moro | Swimming | Women's 50 metres freestyle S12 | November 14 |
| Silver | Lucas Ezequiel Schonfeld | Athletics | Men's long jump F46 | November 15 |
| Silver | Yanina Andrea Martinez | Athletics | Women's 200 metres T36 | November 15 |
| Silver | Lucas Poggi | Swimming | Men's 400 metres freestyle S8 | November 15 |
| Silver | Marta Makishi | Table tennis | Women's singles C5 | November 15 |
| Silver | Alexis Acosta | Athletics | Men's long jump F11 | November 16 |
| Silver | Sebastian Baldassarri | Athletics | Men's shot put F12 | November 16 |
| Silver | Pablo Cortez | Boccia | Individual BC2 | November 16 |
| Silver | Maria Belen Ruiz | Boccia | Individual BC3 | November 16 |
| Silver | Cristina Otero | Cycling | Women's individual track pursuit C1-3 | November 16 |
| Silver | Marco Pulleiro | Swimming | Men's 400 metres freestyle S9 | November 16 |
| Silver | Valeria Jara | Athletics | Women's 100 metres T54 | November 17 |
| Silver | Juan Rosatti | Swimming | Men's 200 metres individual medley SM9 | November 17 |
| Silver | Diego Pastore; Ariel Quassi; Andres Biga Vidal; Sebastian Remirez | Swimming | Men's 4 x 50 metres Medley Relay 20 points | November 17 |
| Silver | Gustavo Fernandez; Augustín Ledesma | Wheelchair tennis | Men's doubles | November 17 |
| Silver | Yanina Andrea Martinez | Athletics | Women's 100 metres T36 | November 18 |
| Silver | Mariela Almada | Athletics | Women's discus throw F12 | November 18 |
| Silver | Carlos Duarte; Fernando Eberhardt | Table tennis | Men's team C1-3 | November 18 |
| Silver | Agustín Ledesma | Wheelchair tennis | Men's singles | November 18 |
| Silver | Anabel Moro | Swimming | Women's 100 metres freestyle S12 | November 19 |
| Silver | Matías de Andrade | Swimming | Men's 100 metres backstroke S7 | November 19 |
| Silver | Guillermo Marro; Facundo Lazo; Marco Pulleiro; Bruno Lemaire | Swimming | Men's 4 x 100 metres Medley Relay 34 points | November 19 |
| Silver | Team Argentina | Football 5-a-side | Men | November 20 |
| Bronze | Daniela Gimenez | Swimming | Women's 100 metres butterfly S9 | November 13 |
| Bronze | Lucas Poggi | Swimming | Men's 100 metres backstroke S8 | November 13 |
| Bronze | Andres Biga Vidal; Alejandro Arzubialde; Sebastian Ramirez; Ariel Quassi | Swimming | Men's 4 x 50 metres freestyle relay 20 points | November 13 |
| Bronze | Matias Silvera | Athletics | Men's long jump F37/38 | November 14 |
| Bronze | Perla Muñoz | Athletics | Women's shot put F35/36/37 | November 14 |
| Bronze | Valeria Jara | Athletics | Women's 400 metres T54 | November 14 |
| Bronze | Sergio Paz | Athletics | Men's discus throw F11 | November 14 |
| Bronze | Ignacio Gonzalez | Swimming | Men's 50 metres freestyle S12 | November 14 |
| Bronze | Facundo Lazo | Swimming | Men's 100 metres breaststroke SB8 | November 14 |
| Bronze | Manuel Cortajerena | Athletics | Men's long jump F46 | November 15 |
| Bronze | Valeria Jara | Athletics | Women's 5,000 metres T54 | November 15 |
| Bronze | Lidia Noemi Britos; Alejandra M. Alliegro | Cycling | Women's individual track pursuit B | November 15 |
| Bronze | Juan Rosatti | Swimming | Men's 50 metres freestyle S9 | November 15 |
| Bronze | Bruno Lemaire | Swimming | Men's 50 metres freestyle S10 | November 15 |
| Bronze | Ignacio Gonzalez | Swimming | Men's 100 metres breaststroke SB12 | November 15 |
| Bronze | Juan Rosatti; Lucas Poggi; Guillermo Marro; Bruno Lemaire | Swimming | Men's 4 x 100 metres Freestyle Relay 34 points | November 15 |
| Bronze | Ernesto Rodriguez | Table tennis | Men's singles C5 | November 15 |
| Bronze | Tomas Devito | Table tennis | Men's singles C6 | November 15 |
| Bronze | Pablo Ferro | Table tennis | Men's singles C7 | November 15 |
| Bronze | Giselle Muñoz | Table tennis | Women's singles C7-9 | November 15 |
| Bronze | Lidia Noemi Britos; Alejandra M. Alliegro | Cycling | Women's 1,000 metres track time trial B | November 16 |
| Bronze | Bruno Lemaire | Swimming | Men's 400 metres freestyle S10 | November 16 |
| Bronze | Perla Muñoz | Athletics | Women's discus throw F35/36/37 | November 17 |
| Bronze | Facundo Lazo | Swimming | Men's 200 metres individual medley SM9 | November 17 |
| Bronze | Jorge Lencina | Judo | Men's 90 kg | November 18 |
| Bronze | Pipo Carlomagno | Swimming | Men's 100 metres freestyle S8 | November 18 |
| Bronze | Lidia Noemi Britos; Alejandra M. Alliegro | Cycling | Women's road race B | November 19 |
| Bronze | Rodolfo Ramirez | Judo | Men's 73 kg | November 19 |
| Bronze | Bruno Lemaire | Swimming | Men's 100 metres freestyle S10 | November 19 |
| Bronze | Ignacio Gonzalez | Swimming | Men's 100 metres freestyle S12 | November 19 |
| Bronze | Paula Karina Gomez | Judo | Women's 48 kg | November 20 |

== Athletics ==
Argentina will send 21 male and 7 female athletes to compete.

== Boccia ==
Argentina will send ten male and four female athletes to compete.

== Cycling ==
Argentina will send four male and five female athletes to compete in the track cycling tournament.

== Football 5-a-side ==
Argentina will send a team of eight athletes to compete.

== Goalball ==
Argentina will send one team of six athletes to compete in the men's tournament.

== Judo ==
Argentina will send five male and one female athlete to compete.

== Powerlifting ==
Argentina will send two male athletes to compete.

== Swimming ==
Argentina will send sixteen male and five female swimmers to compete.

== Table tennis ==
Argentina will send twelve male and four female table tennis players to compete.

== Wheelchair basketball ==
Argentina will send two teams of twelve athletes each to compete in the men's and women's tournaments.

== Wheelchair tennis ==
Argentina will send two male and one female athlete to compete.

== See also ==
- Argentina at the 2011 Pan American Games
- Argentina at the 2012 Summer Paralympics
