= Athletics at the 2011 Parapan American Games =

- Venue: Telmex Athletics Stadium
- Dates: November 14 - November 20
- Competitors: 346 from 21 nations

Athletics contests were held at the 2011 Parapan American Games from November 14 to 20 at the Telmex Athletics Stadium in Guadalajara, Mexico.

== Medal summary ==
=== Medal table ===
Rank	Nation	Gold	Silver	Bronze	Total
1	Brazil	27	23	10	60
2	United States	25	15	16	56
3	Mexico	20	30	30	80
4	Cuba	14	7	7	28
5	Venezuela	12	9	9	30
6	Argentina	8	8	7	23
7	Colombia	6	7	3	16
8	Jamaica	1	4	0	5
9	Canada	0	8	8	16
10	Dominican Republic	0	0	1	1
10	Peru	0	0	1	1
Totals (11 entries)		113	111	92	316

== Medalists ==
=== Men's events ===
Event	Gold	Silver	Bronze
Men's 100 metres T11	Lucas Prado; Brazil; PR	Daniel Silva; Brazil	Arian Iznaga; Cuba
Men's 100 metres T12	Yoldani Silva; Venezuela	Vargas Argenis; Venezuela	Jorge Gonzalez Sauceda; Mexico
Men's 100 metres T13	Luis Gutierrez; Cuba; AR	André Andrade; Brazil	Braedon Dolfo; Canada
Men's 100 metres T35	Hernan Barreto; Argentina; AR	Pedro Marquez Villanueva; Mexico	Not awarded
Men's 100 metres T36	José Florez; Colombia; AR	Tommy Chasanoff; United States	Norberto Zertuche Rodriguez; Mexico
Men's 100 metres T37	Omar Monterola; Venezuela; AR	Lucas Ferrari; Brazil	Benjamin Cardozo Sanchez; Mexico
Men's 100 metres T38	Edson Pinheiro; Brazil; PR	Kyle Whitehouse; Canada	Not awarded
Men's 100 metres T42	Shaquille Vance; United States	Rudy Garcia-Tolson; United States	Not awarded
Men's 100 metres T44	Jarryd Wallace; United States	Blake Leeper; United States	Alan Fonteles; Brazil
Men's 100 metres T46	Yohansson Nascimento; Brazil; AR	Raciel González; Cuba	Brandon Pelletier; United States
Men's 100 metres T52	Salvador Hernandez Mondragon; Mexico	Raymond Martin; United States	Gianfranco Iannotta; United States
Men's 100 metres T53	Ariosvaldo Silva; Brazil; PR	Jésus Aguilar; Venezuela	Zach Abbott; United States
Men's 100 metres T54	Erik Hightower; United States	Thiago Souza; Brazil	Isaiah Christophe; Canada
Men's 200 metres T11	Lucas Prado; Brazil; PR	Daniel Silva; Brazil	Arian Iznaga; Cuba
Men's 200 metres T12	Thierb Siqueira; Brazil	Jorge Gonzalez Sauceda; Mexico	Lázaro Reus Fabian; Cuba
Men's 200 metres T13	Luís Felipe Gutierrez; Cuba; PR	André Andrade; Brazil	Markeith Price; United States
Men's 200 metres T35	Hernan Barreto; Argentina; AR	Pedro Marquez Jr. Mexico	Not awarded
Men's 200 metres T36	José Florez; Colombia; AR	Tommy Chasanoff; United States	Not awarded
Men's 200 metres T37	Omar Monterola; Venezuela; AR	Lucas Ferrari; Brazil	Benjamin Ivan Cardozo Sanchez; Mexico
Men's 200 metres T38	Edson Pinheiro; Brazil	Kyle Whitehouse; Canada	Paulo Pereira; Brazil
Men's 200 metres T44	David Prince; United States; PR	Alan Fonteles; Brazil	Alister McQueen; Canada
Men's 200 metres T46	Yohansson Nascimento; Brazil; WR	Ettiam Calderon; Cuba	Samuel Colmenares; Venezuela
Men's 200 metres T52	Raymond Martin; United States; PR	Salvador Hernandez Mondragon; Mexico	Gianfranco Iannotta; United States
Men's 200 metres T53	Ariosvaldo Fernandes Silva; Brazil	Jésus Aguilar; Venezuela	Zach Abbott; United States
Men's 200 metres T54	Juan Valladares; Venezuela; PR	Erik Hightower; United States	Fernando Sanchez Nava; Mexico
Men's 400 metres T11	Daniel Silva; Brazil; WR	Arian Iznaga; Cuba	Carlos Bartô; Brazil
Men's 400 metres T12	Thierb Siqueira; Brazil	Jorge Gonzalez Saucera; Mexico	Vargas Argenis; Venezuela
Men's 400 metres T13	Miguel Bartelemy Sablon; Cuba; PR	Andre Andrade; Brazil	Juan Carlos Arcos Lira; Mexico
Men's 400 metres T36	Tommy Chasanoff; United States; PR	Fábio Gutierrez Torres; Colombia	Rafael Olmedo Gongora; Mexico
Men's 400 metres T38	Omar Monterola; Venezuela; AR	Edson Pinheiro; Brazil	Paulo Pereira; Brazil
Men's 400 metres T44	David Prince; United States; PR	Josué Benitez Sandoval; Mexico	Jackie Marciano; Canada
Men's 400 metres T46	Samuel Colmenares; Venezuela; PR	Shane Hudson; Jamaica	Yohansson Nascimento; Brazil
Men's 400 metres T52	Salvador Hernandez Mondragon; Mexico; PR	Raymond Martin; United States	Marcos Castillo; Venezuela
Men's 400 metres T53	Jésus Aguilar; Venezuela; PR	Ariosvaldo Fernandes Silva; Brazil	Zach Abbott; United States
Men's 400 metres T54	Fernando Sanchez Nava; Mexico	Juan Valladares; Venezuela	Erik Hightower; United States
Men's 800 metres T12	Lázaro Rashid Aguilar; Cuba; PR	Thierb Siqueira; Brazil	Roger Rodriguez; Venezuela
Men's 800 metres T13	Jose Luis Sanchez; Venezuela	Miguel Bartelemy Sablon; Cuba	Juan Carlos Arcos Lira; Mexico
Men's 800 metres T36	Tommy Chasanoff; United States; PR	Fábio Gutierrez Torres; Colombia	Rafael Olmedo Gongora; Mexico
Men's 800 metres T37	Mariano Dominguez; Argentina; PR	Francisco Coelho; Brazil	Shayne Dobson; Canada
Men's 800 metres T46	Samuel Colmenares; Venezuela	Wuillian Bricero; Venezuela	Mário Santillan Hernandez; Mexico
Men's 800 metres T52	Raymond Martin; United States; PR	Gianfranco Iannotta; United States	Not awarded
Men's 800 metres T53	Jesus Aguilar; Venezuela; PR	Zach Abbott; United States	Miguel Mijanos Velazquez; Mexico
Men's 800 metres T54	Sául Mendoza Hernandez; Mexico	Sairo Moises Fernandez Lopez; Colombia	Martin Velasco Soria; Mexico
Men's 1500 metres T11	Odair Santos; Brazil	Jason Dunkerley; Canada	Carlos J. Barto Silva; Brazil
Men's 1500 metres T13	Lázaro Rashid Aguilar; Cuba	Elkin Serna; Colombia	Juan Carlos Arcos Lira; Mexico
Men's 1500 metres T20	René Norono Verdejo; Venezuela	Jovito Gutierrez; Venezuela	Michael Murray; United States
Men's 1500 metres T37	Francisco Coelho; Brazil; AR	Shayne Dobson; Canada	Not awarded
Men's 1500 metres T46	Chris Hammer; United States	Mário Santillan Hernandez; Mexico	Wuillian Briceno; Venezuela
Men's 1500 metres T54	Aaron Gordian; Mexico	Saul Mendoza; Mexico	Martin Velasco Soria; Mexico
Men's 5000 metres T11	Odair Santos; Brazil; PR	Luis Zapien Rosas; Mexico	Jason Dunkerley; Canada
Men's 5000 metres T12	Elkin Serna; Colombia	Alex Mendonça; Brazil	Daniel Ramirez Alvia; Mexico
Men's 5000 metres T54	Aaron Gordian; Mexico	Saul Mendoza; Mexico	Martin Velasco Soria; Mexico
Men's marathon T54	Aaron Gordian; Mexico	Saul Mendoza Hernandez; Mexico	Alfonso Zaragoza; Mexico
Men's high jump F46	Lucas Ezequiel Schonfeld; Argentina	Not awarded	
Men's long jump F11	Tanner Gers; United States	Alexis Acosta; Argentina	José Belizario Angulo; Colombia
Men's long jump F13	Luis Felipe Gutierrez; Cuba; WR	Angel Jimenez; Cuba	Markeith Price; United States
Men's long jump F37/38	Benjamin Cardozo Sanchez; Mexico	Daniel Tataren; Argentina	Matias Silvera; Argentina
Men's long jump F44	André Oliveira; Brazil; PR	Josue Benitez Sandoval; Mexico	Not awarded
Men's long jump F46	Ettiam Calderon; Cuba; AR	Lucas Schonfeld; Argentina	Manuel Cortajerena; Argentina
Men's shot put F12	Edwin Rodriguez Gonzales; Colombia; PR	Sebastian Baldassarri; Argentina	Anibal Bello; Venezuela
Men's shot put F20	Danyelo Hernandez; Venezuela	Not awarded	
Men's shot put F32/33/34	Sam Craven; United States; PR	Mauricio Valencia; Colombia	Erick Figueredo; Cuba
Men's shot put F52/53	Mauro Máximo de Jesus; Mexico	Scot Severn; United States	Not awarded
Men's shot put F54/55/56	Scott Winkler; United States; AR	Alan Noriega Quinones; Mexico	Leonardo Diaz; Cuba
Men's shot put F57/58	Alejandro Perez Torres; Mexico; PR	José Armando Aranda Balan; Mexico	Fernando del Rosario Gonzalez; Mexico
Men's discus throw F11	Sebastian Baldassarri; Argentina	Edwin Rodriguez Gonzales; Colombia	Sérgio Paz; Argentina
Men's discus throw F32/33/34	Mauricio Valencia; Colombia	Sam Craven; United States	Erick Figueredo; Cuba
Men's discus throw F35/36	Paulo Souza; Brazil; AR	Norberto Zertuche; Mexico	Pompilio Falconi-Alvarez; Peru
Men's discus throw F37/38	Leandro Ricci; Argentina; AR	Kevin Strybosch; Canada	Franklin Oquendo Fonseca; Cuba
Men's discus throw F42	Matthew Brown; United States	Jorge Madrigal; Mexico	Luis Vicioso; Dominican Republic
Men's discus throw F51/52/53	Alphanso Cunningham; Jamaica	Scot Severn; United States	Not awarded
Men's discus throw F54/55/56	Leonardo Diaz; Cuba; WR	Tanto Campbell; Jamaica	Scott Winkler; United States
Men's discus throw F57/58	Fernando del Rosario Gonzalez; Mexico; PR	Dennis Ogbe; United States	Claudiney Batista; Brazil
Men's javelin throw F42	Edgar Barajas; Mexico	Jorge Madrigal; Mexico	Luis Jurado; Mexico
Men's javelin throw F44	Francisco Lima; Brazil	Gerdan Fonseca; Cuba	Alister McQueen; Canada
Men's javelin throw F52/53	Mauro Máximo de Jesus; Mexico	Alphanso Cunningham; Jamaica	Not awarded
Men's javelin throw F54/55/56	Luis Zepeda Felix; Mexico	Leonardo Diaz; Cuba	Juan Valera Osorio; Mexico
Men's javelin throw F57/58	Claudiney Batista; Brazil; PR	Fernando del Rosario Gonzalez; Mexico	Fernando Mina Cortes; Colombia

=== Women's events ===
Event	Gold	Silver	Bronze
Women's 100 metres T11	Terezinha Guilhermina; Brazil	Jerusa Geber dos Santos; Brazil	Jhulia Dos Santos; Brazil
Women's 100 metres T12	Daineris Mijan; Cuba	Ana Soares; Brazil	Daniela Velasco; Mexico
Women's 100 metres T13	Omara Durand; Cuba; WR	Viviane Soares; Brazil	Joana Helena Silva; Brazil
Women's 100 metres T34	Kristen Messer; United States; WR	Carleigh Dewald; United States	Christy Campbell; Canada
Women's 100 metres T36	Nadía Schaus; Argentina; AR	Yanina Andrea Martinez; Argentina	Sandra Fonseca Solis; Mexico
Women's 100 metres T37	Sabra Hawkes; United States	Neydy Aguilera; Colombia	Not awarded
Women's 100 metres T38	Jenifer Santos; Brazil; PR	Virginia McLachlan; Canada	Fatima del Rocio Perez Garcia; Mexico
Women's 100 metres T46	Yunidis Castillo; Cuba; PR	Sheila Finder; Brazil	Not awarded
Women's 100 metres T53	Chelsea McClammer; United States; PR	Sarah White; Canada	Yadira Soturno; Venezuela
Women's 100 metres T54	Yazmith Bataz; Mexico; PR	Valéria Jara; Argentina	Amberlynn Weber; United States
Women's 200 metres T11	Terezinha Guilhermina; Brazil; PR	Jerusa Geber dos Santos; Brazil	Casandra Guadalupe Cruz; Mexico
Women's 200 metres T12	Daineris Mijan; Cuba	Ana Tércia Soares; Brazil	Daniela Velasco; Mexico
Women's 200 metres T36	Nadía Schaus; Argentina; AR	Yanina Martinez; Argentina	Not awarded
Women's 200 metres T38	Jenifer Santos; Brazil; PR	Virginia McLachlan; Canada	Fátima Perez Garcia; Mexico
Women's 200 metres T53	Chelsea McClammer; United States; PR	Evelyn Enciso; Mexico	Yadira Soturno; Venezuela
Women's 200 metres T54	Amberlynn Weber; United States	Yazmith Bataz; Mexico	Gloria Sanchez; Mexico
Women's 400 metres T12	Terezinha Guilhermina; Brazil; PR	Daniela Velasco; Mexico	Maria de Jesus Reyes Alonso; Mexico
Women's 400 metres T13	Omara Durand; Cuba	Joana Helena Silva; Brazil	Not awarded
Women's 400 metres T53	Chelsea McClammer; United States	Evelyn Enciso; Mexico	Yadira Soturno; Venezuela
Women's 400 metres T54	Amberlynn Weber; United States	Yazmith Bataz; Mexico	Valéria Jara; Argentina
Women's 800 metres T54	Amberlynn Weber; United States	Glória Sanchez; Mexico	Chelsea McClammer; United States
Women's 1500 metres T54	Chelsea McClammer; United States	Ivonne Reyes Gómez; Mexico	Not awarded
Women's 5000 metres T54	Chelsea McClammer; United States	Ivonne Reyes Gómez; Mexico	Valéria Jara; Argentina
Women's shot put F12	Tânia Lorena Jimenez; Mexico; PR	Yuclesy Pinto; Venezuela	Yesenia Restrepo; Colombia
Women's shot put F20	Leslie Mendoza; Mexico	Eddy Guerrero; Venezuela	Not awarded
Women's shot put F35/36/37	Shirlene Coelho; Brazil; PR	Marivana Oliveira; Brazil	Perla Muñoz; Argentina
Women's shot put F54/55/56	Yanive Torres Martinez; Colombia; AR	Angela Madsen; United States	Verônica Saucedo; Mexico
Women's shot put F57/58	Maria Ortiz; Mexico; WR	Catalina Rosales Montiel; Mexico	Roseanne Santos; Brazil
Women's discus throw F12	Yaumara Milan; Cuba; PR'	Mariela Almada; Argentina	Not awarded
Women's discus throw F35/36/37	Marivana Oliveira; Brazil; AR	Shirlene Coelho; Brazil	Perla Amanda Munoz; Argentina
Women's discus throw F51/52/53	Zena Cole; United States; PR	Estela Salas; Mexico	Not awarded
Women's discus throw F57/58	Roseane Santos; Brazil	Maria de los Angeles Ortiz; Mexico	Catherine Callahan; United States
Women's javelin throw F37/38	Shirlene Coelho; Brazil; PR	Yomaira Cohen; Venezuela	Julie Crisp; United States
Women's javelin throw F52/53/33/34	Esther Rivera; Mexico	Estela Salas; Mexico	Robyn Stawski; United States
Women's javelin throw F54-58	Jeny Velazco; Mexico; PR	Sylvia Grant; Jamaica	Dora Elia García; Mexico
