= Swimming at the 2011 Parapan American Games =

Paralympic swimming at the 2011 Parapan American Games
- Venue: Scotiabank Aquatics Center
- Dates: 13 – 19 November 2011

Swimming was contested at the 2011 Parapan American Games from November 13 to 19 at the Scotiabank Aquatics Center in Guadalajara, Mexico.

== Medal summary ==
=== Medal table ===
Rank	Nation	Gold	Silver	Bronze	Total
1	Brazil (BRA)	33	23	29	85
2	Mexico (MEX)	20	21	19	60
3	United States (USA)	8	11	5	24
4	Argentina (ARG)	6	9	14	29
5	Colombia (COL)	6	8	4	18
6	Cuba (CUB)	6	3	1	10
7	Venezuela (VEN)	4	3	2	9
8	Canada (CAN)	3	6	8	17
9	Trinidad and Tobago (TRI)	0	0	2	2
Totals (9 entries)		86	84	84	254

=== Men's events ===
Event	Gold		Silver		Bronze	
50 metre freestyle S3	Genezi Andrade; Brazil	1:02.68	Cristopher Tronco; Mexico	1:05.75	Luis Burgos Godinez; Mexico	1:07.90
50 metre freestyle S4	Gustavo Sanchez; Mexico	40.29	Juan Reyes; Mexico	45.87	Ronystony Cordeiro; Brazil	48.42
50 metre freestyle S5	Daniel Dias; Brazil	32.80 PR	Clodoaldo Silva; Brazil	35.45	Francisco Avelino; Brazil	43.98
50 metre freestyle S6	Lorenzo Perez Escalona; Cuba	31.44 AR	Nelson Crispín; Colombia	33.14	Adriano Lima; Brazil	33.53
50 metre freestyle S7	Enrique Perez; Mexico	32.87	Daniel Kamber; United States	34.10	Ronaldo Santos; Brazil	34.22
50 metre freestyle S8	Luis Andrade Guillen; Mexico	29.74 PR	William Santana; Brazil	30.05	Christopher Sergeant-Tsonos; Canada	30.75
50 metre freestyle S9	Vanilton Filho; Brazil	27.53	Matheus Silva; Brazil	28.17	Juan Rosatti; Argentina	28.60
50 metre freestyle S10	André Brasil; Brazil	23.64 PR	Phelipe Rodrigues; Brazil	24.24	Bruno Lemaire; Argentina	27.72
50 metre freestyle S11	Yunerki Ortega; Cuba	29.12	Matheus Rheine; Brazil	29.52	Tharon Drake; United States	30.84
50 metre freestyle S12	Daniel Giraldo Correa; Colombia	26.28 PR	Pedro Gonzalez Valdiviezo; Venezuela	27.73	Ignacio Gonzalez; Argentina	27.77
50 metre freestyle S13	Carlos Farrenberg; Brazil	25.19 PR	Julio Soria; Cuba	27.18	João de Castro Almeida; Brazil	27.32
100 metre freestyle S5	Daniel Dias; Brazil	1:10.14 PR	Clodoaldo Silva; Brazil	1:20.59	Gustavo Sanchez; Mexico	1:29.48
100 metre freestyle S6	Lorenzo Perez Escalona; Cuba	1:09.42 AR	Rafael Castillo; Cuba	1:11.69	Adriano Lima; Brazil	1:12.72
100 metre freestyle S8	Luis Andrade Guillen; Mexico	1:04.28 AR	Caio Oliveira; Brazil	1:05.49	Pipo Carlomagno; Argentina	1:07.68
100 metre freestyle S9	Vanilton Filho; Brazil	1:00.03	Arturo Larraga; Mexico	1:01.41	Matheus Silva; Brazil	1:03.81
100 metre freestyle S10	André Brasil; Brazil	51.60 PR	Phelipe Rodrigues; Brazil	53.05	Bruno Lemaire; Argentina	59.53
100 metre freestyle S12	Daniel Giraldo Correa; Colombia	57.46 PR	Pedro Gonzalez Valdiviezo; Venezuela	1:01.12	Ignacio Gonzalez; Argentina	1:01.49
100 metre freestyle S13	Carlos Farrenberg; Brazil	54.57 PR	Julio Soria; Cuba	59.91	João de Castro Almeida; Brazil	1:02.21
200 metre freestyle S5	Daniel Dias; Brazil	2:35.04 PR	Clodoaldo Silva; Brazil	3:03.49	Gustavo Sanchez; Mexico	3:08.99
200 metre freestyle S14	Alberto Vera Moran; Venezuela	2:10.13	Adam Rahier; Canada	2:11.76	Maxime Rousselle; Canada	2:12.79
400 metre freestyle S6	Lorenzo Perez Escalona; Cuba	5:40.47	Daniel Londono; Colombia	5:40.85	Adriano Lima; Brazil	5:51.71
400 metre freestyle S7	Ronaldo Santos; Brazil	5:26.45	Enrique Perez; Mexico	5:26.98	Jean-Sebastien Lapointe; Canada	6:14.46
400 metre freestyle S8	Caio Oliveira; Brazil	4:53.83 PR	Lucas Poggi; Argentina	5:25.09	Alexandre Fernandes; Brazil	5:31.46
400 metre freestyle S9	Vanilton Filho; Brazil	4:45.14	Marco Pulleiro; Argentina	4:46.43	Arturo Larraga; Mexico	4:54.99
400 metre freestyle S10	André Brasil; Brazil	4:16.56	Phelipe Rodrigues; Brazil	4:30.04	Bruno Lemaire; Argentina	4:33.40
50 metre backstroke S5	Daniel Dias; Brazil	35.63 PR	Francisco Avelino; Brazil	45.93	Juan Reyes; Mexico	46.17
100 metre backstroke S6	Talisson Glock; Brazil	1:25.31 PR	Jeférson Amaro; Brazil	1:27.78	Santiago Londono Alvarez; Colombia	1:33.36
100 metre backstroke S7	Guillermo Marro; Argentina	1:14.15 PR	Matias de Andrade; Argentina	1:16.55	Ronaldo Santos; Brazil	1:22.76
100 metre backstroke S8	Caio Oliveira; Brazil	1:14.52 PR	Christopher Sergeant-Tsonos; Canada	1:17.48	Lucas Poggi; Argentina	1:19.77
100 metre backstroke S11	Sergio Zayas; Argentina	1:17.85 PR	Juan Buitrago Blanco; Colombia	1:17.93	Yunerki Ortega; Cuba	1:22.91
100 metre backstroke S14	Adam Rahier; Canada	1:06.63	Alberto Vera Moran; Venezuela	1:06.83	Gutemberg Ferraz; Brazil	1:11.60
50 metre breaststroke SB2	Amulfo Castorena; Mexico	58.44 PR	Cristopher Tronco; Mexico	1:08.81	Genezi Andrade; Brazil	1:20.02
50 metre breaststroke SB3	Gustavo Sanchez; Mexico	56.50 AR	Moisés Batista; Brazil	1:03.29	Omar Osorio Salazar; Mexico	1:03.36
100 metre breaststroke SB4	Daniel Dias; Brazil	1:37.31 PR	Moisés Fuentes; Colombia	1:42.64	Francisco Avelino; Brazil	1:54.69
100 metre breaststroke SB5	Pedro Rangel; Mexico	1:36.23 PR	Adriano Lima; Brazil	1:45.63	Alejandro Silva; Mexico	1:46.26
100 metre breaststroke SB6	Nelson Crispín; Colombia	1:32.59 PR	Mario Bolaños Roa; Colombia	1:38.53	Nélio Almeida; Brazil	1:40.03
100 metre breaststroke SB8	Carlos Lopes Maciel; Brazil	1:21.43	Luis Andrade Guillen; Mexico	1:21.96	Facundo Lazo; Argentina	1:23.86
100 metre breaststroke SB9	André Brasil; Brazil	1:17.21 PR	Matheus Silva; Brazil	1:18.30	Thomas Swinkels; Canada	1:22.92
100 metre breaststroke SB11	Yunerki Ortega; Cuba	1:22.43 PR	Brayan Urbana Herrera; Colombia	1:22.59	Leider Lemus Rojas; Colombia	1:23.26
100 metre breaststroke SB12	Daniel Giraldo Correa; Colombia	1:12.79 AR	Renato Silva; Brazil	1:18.04	Ignacio Gonzalez; Argentina	1:20.32
100 metre breaststroke SB14	Alberto Vera Moran; Venezuela	1:15.39	Adam Rahier; Canada	1:17.77	Maxime Rousselle; Canada	1:18.39
50 metre butterfly S5	Daniel Dias; Brazil	35.12 PR	Clodoaldo Silva; Brazil	45.80	Juan Reyes; Mexico	50.83
50 metre butterfly S6	Rafael Castillo; Cuba	33.69 AR	Nelson Crispín; Colombia	34.88	Jeferson Amaro; Brazil	36.45
50 metre butterfly S7	Nélio Almeida; Brazil	36.83	Daniel Kamber; United States	37.08	Enrique Perez; Mexico	37.45
100 metre butterfly S8	Luis Andrade Guillen; Mexico	1:08.22 PR	Angel Buitian Santiago; Mexico	1:14.30	Caio Oliveira; Brazil	1:16.77
100 metre butterfly S9	Marco Pulleiro; Argentina	1:05.99	Arturo Larraga; Mexico	1:08.05	Vanilton Filho; Brazil	1:09.46
150 metre individual medley SM3	Arnulfo Castorena; Mexico	3:23.56	Cristopher Tronco; Mexico	3:39.94	Genezi Andrade; Brazil	3:46.02
200 metre individual medley SM6	Daniel Dias; Brazil	2:51.00 PR	Daniel Londono; Colombia	3:08.02 PR	Adriano Lima; Brazil	3:28.82
200 metre individual medley SM8	Luis Andrade Guillén; Mexico	2:38.86 PR	Caio Oliveira; Brazil	2:44.69	William Santana; Brazil	2:53.25
200 metre individual medley SM9	Matheus Silva; Brazil	2:41.23	Juan Rosatti; Argentina	2:41.63	Facundo Lazo; Argentina	2:49.33
200 metre individual medley SM12	Daniel Giraldo Correa; Colombia	2:26.95 PR	Ignacio Gonzalez; Argentina	2:34.11	Renato Silva; Brazil	2:42.27
4x50 metre freestyle relay	Brazil (BRA); Ronystony Cordeiro; Adriano Lima; Clodoaldo Silva; Daniel Dias	2:34.01	Mexico (MEX); Juan Reyes; Arnulfo Castorena; Gustavo Sanchez; Luis Andrade Guillen	2:46.19	Argentina (ARG); Andres Biga Vidal; Alejandro Arzubialde; Sebastian Ramirez; Ariel Quassi	3:19.56
4x100 metre freestyle relay	Brazil (BRA); Phelipe Rodrigues; Daniel Dias; Vanilton Filho; André Brasil	3:58.48 PR	Mexico (MEX); Arturo Larraga; Luis Andrade Guillen; Enrique Perez; Angel Buitian Santiago	4:28.55	Argentina (ARG); Juan Rosatti; Lucas Poggi; Guillermo Marro; Bruno Lemaire	4:31.01
4x50 metre medley relay	Brazil (BRA); Daniel Dias; Francisco Avelino; Jeférson Amaro; Clodoaldo Silva	2:38.22	Argentina (ARG); Diego Pastore; Ariel Quassi; Andres Biga Vidal; Sebastian Ramirez	3:21.88	Not awarded	
4x100 metre medley relay	Brazil (BRA); Daniel Dias; Matheus Silva; André Brasil; Phelipe Rodrigues	4:23.99 AR	Argentina (ARG); Guillermo Marro; Facundo Lazo; Marco Pulleiro; Bruno Lemaire	4:41.06	Mexico (MEX); Arturo Larraga; Luis Andrade Guillen; Angel Buitian Santiago; Enrique Perez	5:00.25

=== Women's events ===
Event	Gold		Silver		Bronze	
50 metre freestyle S3	Patricia Valle; Mexico	1:01.06 PR	Haidee Aceves; Mexico	1:11.43	Paula Lara Rodriguez; Colombia	1:12.64
50 metre freestyle S5	Joana da Silva; Brazil	39.42 PR	Alyssa Gialamas; United States	47.89	Nely Miranda Herrera; Mexico	50.61
50 metre freestyle S6	Doramitzi Gonzalez; Mexico	38.51	Vianney Trejo; Mexico	39.78	Michelle Fischer; United States	41.61
50 metre freestyle S9	Daniela Gimenez; Argentina	31.43	Anna Johannes; United States	31.92	Camille Cruz; Brazil	33.37
50 metre freestyle S12	Belkys Mota; Venezuela	30.98	Anabel Moro; Argentina	31.28	Regiane Nunes Silva; Brazil	32.66
100 metre freestyle S3	Patricia Valle; Mexico	2:08.36 PR	Haidee Aceves; Mexico	2:33.66	Paula Lara Rodriguez; Colombia	2:39.47
100 metre freestyle S5	Joana da Silva; Brazil	1:29.57 PR	Alyssa Gialamas; United States	1:39.53	Nely Miranda Herrera; Mexico	1:44.40
100 metre freestyle S6	Doramitzi Gonzalez; Mexico	1:23.54 PR	Vianney Trejo; Mexico	1:25.04	Karina Domingo Bello; Mexico	1:29.25
100 metre freestyle S9	Anna Johannes; United States	1:09.02	Camille Cruz; Brazil	1:11.10	Shanntol Ince; Trinidad and Tobago	1:13.28
100 metre freestyle S12	Belkys Mota; Venezuela	1:08.13 PR	Anabel Moro; Argentina	1:10.27	Regiane Nunes Silva; Brazil	1:12.59
200 metre freestyle S5	Joana da Silva; Brazil	3:18.50 PR	Alyssa Gialamas; United States	3:22.24	Nely Miranda Herrera; Mexico	3:41.60
200 metre freestyle S14	Kirstie Kasko; Canada	2:25.40	Beatriz Resendiz; Mexico	2:30.25	Jana Murphy; Canada	2:30.99
400 metre freestyle S6	Vianney Trejo; Mexico	6:03.28 PR	Doramitzi Gonzalez; Mexico	6:25.95	Karina Domingo Bello; Mexico	6:32.11
400 metre freestyle S9	Anna Johannes; United States	5:09.18	Camille Cruz; Brazil	5:32.78	Susana Ribeiro; Brazil	5:35.96
50 metre backstroke S5	Edênia Garcia; Brazil	52.48 PR	Alyssa Gialamas; United States	53.17	Nadia Porras; Mexico	55.59
100 metre backstroke S6	Vianney Trejo; Mexico	1:35.61 PR	Doramitzi Gonzalez; Mexico	1:43.66	Irina Kaplan; United States	1:48.62
100 metre backstroke S9	Anna Johannes; United States	1:17.59	Camille Cruz; Brazil	1:21.88	Shanntol Ince; Trinidad and Tobago	1:23.45
100 metre backstroke S14	Kirstie Kasko; Canada	1:20.10	Jana Murphy; Canada	1:21.23	Mariana Diaz de la Vega; Mexico	1:27.10
50 metre breaststroke SB2	Haidee Aceves; Mexico	1:41.58 PR	Fabiola Ramirez; Mexico	1:50.14	Kayla Wheeler; United States	2:25.49
100 metre breaststroke SB4	Navier Ome Ramos; Colombia	2:21.25	Jessica Rogers; United States	2:28.86	Leticia Ferreira; Brazil	2:32.68
100 metre breaststroke SB6	Reilly Boyt; United States	1:56.61	Karina Domingo Bello; Mexico	2:04.26	Danielle Kisser; Canada	2:04.99
100 metre breaststroke SB8	Anna Johannes; United States	1:27.14 PR	Amanda Everlove; United States	1:38.09	Gabriela Cantagallo; Brazil	1:43.59
100 metre breaststroke SB9	Daniela Gimenez; Argentina	1:24.89 PR	Hannah Smith; Canada	1:29.56	Kennedy Pasay; Canada	1:42.87
100 metre breaststroke SB12	Anabel Moro; Argentina	1:25.13 PR	Raquel Viel; Brazil	1:31.69	Belkys Mota; Venezuela	1:33.70
100 metre breaststroke SB14	Mariana Diaz de la Vega; Mexico	1:27.67	Jana Murphy; Canada	1:29.63	Viviana Moraes Barreto; Venezuela	1:30.79
50 metre butterfly S5	Joana da Silva; Brazil	50.61 PR	Sofia Olmos; Mexico	56.49	Haley Beranbaum; United States	56.95
50 metre butterfly S6	Vianney Trejo; Mexico	44.13	Casey Johnson; United States	45.29	Maria Silva; Brazil	45.32
100 metre butterfly S9	Amanda Everlove; United States	1:15.80	Not awarded		Daniela Gimenez; Argentina	1:17.03
100 metre butterfly S9	Anna Johannes; United States	1:15.80	Not awarded		Daniela Gimenez; Argentina	1:17.03
200 metre individual medley SM5	Haley Berenbaum; United States	4:32.29	Leticia Ferreira; Brazil	4:41.46	Sofia Olmos; Mexico	4:50.82
200 metre individual medley SM6	Vianney Trejo; Mexico	3:35.93	Reilly Boyt; United States	3:40.34	Karina Domingo Bello; Mexico	3:42.59
