= Brandon Wagner (basketball) =

Canadian wheelchair basketball player (born 1983)

Personal information
- Born: April 18, 1983 (age 43) Kitchener, Ontario, Canada
Medals
Men's wheelchair basketball
Representing Canada
Paralympic Games
Gold medal – first place	2012 London	Team competition
Parapan American Games
Silver medal – second place	2007 Rio de Janeiro	Team competition
Bronze medal – third place	2011 Guadalajara	Team competition

Brandon Wagner (born April 18, 1983) is a Canadian wheelchair basketball player from Kitchener, Ontario. He began playing wheelchair basketball in 2002 and joined the U23 junior national team in 2005. In 2007, he won a silver medal at the Parapan American Games in Rio de Janeiro. A year later, he supported the University of Illinois toward a collegiate championship win. In 2009, he was named Student-Athlete of the Year at his alma mater, and two years later, he won bronze at the 2011 Parapan American Games in Guadalajara, Mexico. In 2012, he participated in his first Olympics in London, where he won gold.
