= Markeith Price =

American Paralympic athlete

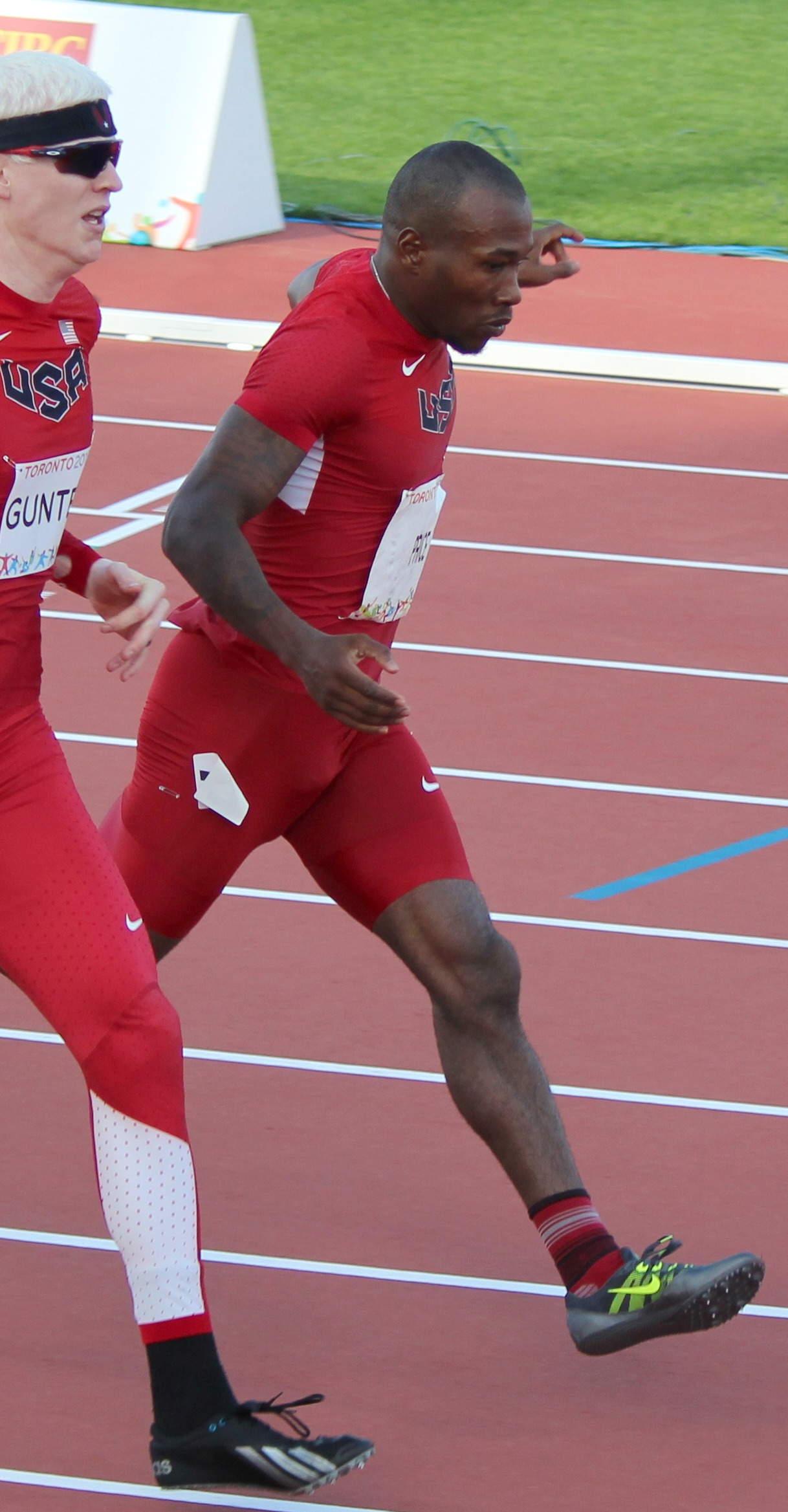
- Price at the 2015 Parapan American Games

Personal information
- Full name: Markeith LeRoy Price
- Nationality: United States
- Born: May 19, 1990 (age 36)
- Height: 6 ft 2 in (1.88 m)

Sport
- Sport: Paralympic athletics
- Disability class: T13
- Event: Sprint
Medal record
Representing United States
Parapan American Games
Bronze medal – third place	2011 Guadalajara	200 m T13
Bronze medal – third place	2011 Guadalajara	Long jump T13
IPC Athletics World Championships
Silver medal – second place	2013 Lyon	4 × 100 m T11–13

Markeith LeRoy Price (born May 19, 1990) is a visually impaired Paralympic athlete raised in Baltimore, Maryland in the United States competing in T13 (track) and F13 (field) events for the United States.

He reached the finals in the 400 m and long jump at the 2012 Summer Paralympic Games. He also competed in the 2013 IPC Athletics World Championships in Lyon, France, where he won a silver medal in the 4 × 100 m relay. His relay team set a new national record with a time of 43.62.

== Education ==
For high school Markeith attended Mount St. Joseph College in Baltimore, Maryland, graduating in 2008. He went on to attend Tennessee State University (TSU) where he was a track and field athlete. Markeith graduated from TSU in 2012 with a degree in fashion merchandise.

== Family ==
Markeith is the son of Keith and Marcella Price. He is also the brother of Octavia M. Price. His parents raised him in the Christian church and to be a respectable adult.

== I C You Foundation, Inc. ==
Markeith is founder and president of I C You Foundation. Their mission is "We are called and committed to service the needs of visually impaired students. To give back to the community by providing scholarships to students who are visually impaired/blind."

== Major accomplishments ==
- 2015: Parapan American Games – 4th in 100 m and long jump
- 2015: Desert Challenge Games Gold Medalist – 100 m, 400 m Tempe, Arizona
- 2014: U.S. Paralympic Track and Field National Championships Gold Medalist – 400m, San Mateo, California
- 2013: IPC Athletics World Championships Silver Medalist – 4 × 100 m relay, Lyon, France
- 2013: IPC Athletics World Championships Sixth Place – Long jump, Lyon, France
- 2013: U.S. Paralympic Track and Field National Championships Gold Medalist – 400 m, San Antonio
- 2012: U.S. Paralympic Track and Field National Championships Gold Medalist – 400 m, Indianapolis
- 2011: IPC Athletics World Championships Fourth Place – 200 m dash, Christchurch, New Zealand
- 2011: Parapan American Games Bronze Medalist – 200 m dash, Guadalajara, Mexico
- 2011: Parapan American Games Bronze Medalist – Long jump, Guadalajara, Mexico
- 2011: U.S. Paralympic Track and Field National Championships Gold Medalist – 400m, Miramar, Florida
- 2010: U.S. Paralympic Track and Field National Championships Gold Medalist – 400 m, Miramar, Florida
- 2009: U.S. Paralympic Track and Field National Championships Gold Medalist – 400 m, Miramar, Florida
- 2007: IBSA World Championships Silver Medalist – Triple jump, São Paulo, Brazil

=== Records ===
Price currently holds the United States Association of Blind Athletes records in the 200 m, 400 m, 800 m and long jump.

=== Awards ===
In August 2017, Price received the Athletes in Excellence Award from The Foundation for Global Sports Development in recognition of his community service efforts and work with youth.
