= Erik Hightower =

American Paralympic athlete (born 1986)

Personal information
- Born: 6 April 1986 (age 40) Phoenix, Arizona, United States
- Height: 1.78 m (5 ft 10 in)

Sport
- Country: United States
- Sport: Paralympic athletics
- Disability: Spina bifida
- Disability class: T54
- Coached by: Joaquim Cruz
Medal record
Paralympic athletics
Representing United States
World Championships
Gold medal – first place	2019 Dubai	Universal 4 × 100 m relay
Silver medal – second place	2006 Assen	4 × 100 m relay T53-54
Parapan American Games
Gold medal – first place	2011 Guadalajara	100 m T54
Gold medal – first place	2019 Lima	Universal 4 × 100 m relay
Silver medal – second place	2011 Guadalajara	200 m T54
Silver medal – second place	2015 Toronto	400 m T54
Silver medal – second place	2019 Lima	100 m T54
Silver medal – second place	2019 Lima	400 m T54
Bronze medal – third place	2007 Rio de Janeiro	200 m T54
Bronze medal – third place	2011 Guadalajara	400 m T54

Erik Hightower (born 6 April 1986) is an American Paralympic athlete who competes in wheelchair racing events at international elite competitions and has participated at three Paralympic Games. He is a double Parapan American Games champion and a World champion in the 4 × 100 metre relay.

== Theft of wheelchair ==
In June 2014, Hightower's custom made $5,000 racing wheelchair was stolen from his cousin's truck in Anderson Township, Ohio. He had visited the Mercy Anderson Hospital to visit someone and then an hour later, he noticed that his chair had gone missing which he only had bought two months ago. He and his family were confused on why the perpetrator would steal his wheelchair that was "useless for anybody else", he had a theory that the culprit could be stealing his wheelchair to collect scrap metal and he contacted local scrap metal businesses to warn about his stolen wheelchair and reported the theft to the police. Hightower also asked for the CCTV footage of the hospital's car park but there was no camera coverage of the car park where his cousin's truck was parked.

His wheelchair was later recovered a week later when it was found in a baseball field in New Richmond.
