= Jorge Hierrezuelo =

Cuban Paralympic judoka (born 1983)

Personal information
- Full name: Jorge Hierrezuelo Marcillis
- Born: 11 April 1983 (age 43) Santiago de Cuba, Cuba

Sport
- Country: Cuba
- Sport: Para judo
Medal record
Para judo
Representing Cuba
Paralympic Games
Gold medal – first place	2012 London	Men's -90kg
Parapan American Games
Gold medal – first place	2011 Guadalajara	Men's -90kg
Silver medal – second place	2015 Toronto	Men's -90kg
World Championships
Bronze medal – third place	2006 Brommat	Men's -73kg

Jorge Hierrezuelo Marcillis (born 11 April 1983) is a Cuban Paralympic judoka who competes in international judo competitions. He is a Paralympic and Parapan American Games champion, he is also a World bronze medalist.
