= Mario Santillán =

Mexican Paralympic athlete (born 1981)

Medal record

Representing Mexico

Men's para-athletics

Paralympic Games
Gold medal – first place	2008 Beijing	Marathon T46
Bronze medal – third place	2008 Beijing	5000m T46

Parapan American Games
Gold medal – first place	2007 Rio de Janeiro	1500m T46
Gold medal – first place	2007 Rio de Janeiro	5000m T46
Silver medal – second place	2011 Guadalajara	1500m T46
Bronze medal – third place	2011 Guadalajara	800m T46

Men's para-duathlon

World Championships
Silver medal – second place	2016 Aviles	PT4

Mario Santillán Hernández (Note: In this Spanish name, the first or paternal surname is Santillán and the second or maternal family name is Hernández.) (born April 22, 1981) is a Paralympic athlete from Mexico competing mainly in category T46 long-distance events. He is missing his right hand.

He competed in the 2008 Summer Paralympics in Beijing, China. There he won a gold medal in the men's Marathon – T46 event in world record time. He also won a bronze medal in the men's 5000 metres – T46 event.

As of January 2013, his T46 marathon world record, set in Beijing, remains unbeaten.
