= Daniela Velasco =

Mexican Paralympic athlete

Personal information
- Full name: Daniela Eugenia Velasco Maldonado
- Nationality: Mexico
- Born: 24 August 1995 (age 30) Mexico City
- Education: Universidad Nacional Autónoma de México

Sport
- Disability class: T12
- Events: 1500 meters & 400 meters
- Club: Aldebaran Track and Field México
- Coached by: Fabricio Chamor
Medal record
Paralympic athletics
Representing Mexico
Paralympic Games
Bronze medal – third place	2012 London	400m T12
Parapan American Games
Gold medal – first place	2015 Toronto	800m T12
Silver medal – second place	2011 Guadalajara	400m T12
Silver medal – second place	2015 Toronto	400m T12
Silver medal – second place	2023 Santiago	1500m T13
Bronze medal – third place	2011 Guadalajara	100m T12
Bronze medal – third place	2011 Guadalajara	200m T12

Daniela Eugenia Velasco Maldonado (born 24 August 1995) is a Mexican Paralympic athlete who was part of the Mexican delegation at the 2016 Summer Paralympics. She was a bronze medalist in the 400 meters dash of the T12 category at the 2012 Summer Paralympics. She was close to being a medalist in the 1500 meters of Rio 2016 but was then disqualified.

== Personal life ==
As a child she suffered the loss of an eye and rehabilitated at the National Institute for Rehabilitation of Blind and Visually Impaired Children of Mexico. Her start in athletics was motivated by Ana Gabriela Guevara, whom she watched competing in the 2004 Summer Olympics, so she looked for opportunities to practice adaptive sports in the Mexican Paralympic Center.

She is a student of the National Preparatory School of the National Autonomous University of Mexico. Her coach is Fabricio Chamor and her guide is Gabriel Urbina.

== Sports career ==
Velasco won two bronze medals and one silver medal at the 2011 Parapan American Games, in the 100, 200 and 400-meters dash, respectively. At the 2012 Summer Paralympics, she competed in the 400 meters dash in the T12 category, with her guide Jose Fuentes, obtaining the bronze medal with a time of 58.51. In the 2015 Parapan American Games, she achieved the gold medal in the 800 meters T12 category with a 2:16.89 run time, which represented an American record.
