= Trinidad and Tobago at the 2011 Parapan American Games =

- IOC code: TTO
- NOC: Trinidad & Tobago Paralympic Committee
- Website: http://www.ttpconline.org/

in Guadalajara 12-20 November 2011
- Competitors: 1 in 1 sport
- Medals Ranked 9th: Gold 0 Silver 0 Bronze 2 Total 2

Parapan American Games appearances
- 1999; 2003; 2007; 2011; 2015; 2019; 2023

Trinidad and Tobago participated in the 2011 Parapan American Games.

== Competitors ==
Trinidad and Tobago sent one competitor, Shanntol Ince, who competed in women's swimming events.

== Medalists ==
Medal	Name	Sport	Event	Date
Bronze	Shanntol Ince	Swimming	Women's 100 metres backstroke S9	November 18
Bronze	Shanntol Ince	Swimming	Women's 100 metres freestyle S9	November 19

== Swimming ==
Women

Athlete	Event	Final	
Athlete	Event	Time	Rank
Shanntol Ince	Women's 50 m Freestyle S9	34.33	4
Shanntol Ince	Women's 100 m Backstroke S9	1:23.45	3rd place, bronze medalist(s)
Shanntol Ince	Women's 100 m Breaststroke SB8	1:43.39	5
Shanntol Ince	Women's 100 m Butterfly S9	1:24.93	4
Shanntol Ince	Women's 100 m Freestyle S9	1:13.28	3rd place, bronze medalist(s)
Shanntol Ince	Women's 400 m Freestyle S9	5:39.48	4

== See also ==
- Trinidad and Tobago at the 2011 Pan American Games
- Trinidad and Tobago at the 2012 Summer Paralympics
