= Omar Monterola =

Venezuelan Paralympic athlete

Personal information
- Born: 1 August 1987 (age 38) Curiepe, Venezuela

Sport
- Country: Venezuela
- Sport: Athletics
- Event: Sprint

Achievements and titles
- Paralympic finals: 2012
Medal record
Track and field (athletics)
Representing Venezuela
Paralympic Games
Silver medal – second place	2016 Rio de Janeiro	400m T37
Bronze medal – third place	2012 London	200m T37
IPC Athletics World Championships
Bronze medal – third place	2013 Lyon	200 m T37
Parapan American Games
Gold medal – first place	2011 Guadalajara	100 m T37
Gold medal – first place	2011 Guadalajara	200 m T37
Gold medal – first place	2011 Guadalajara	400 m T37
Silver medal – second place	2015 Toronto	200 m T37
Silver medal – second place	2015 Toronto	400 m T37
Silver medal – second place	2019 Lima	400m T37
Bronze medal – third place	2015 Toronto	100 m T37

Omar Monterola (born 1 August 1987) is a Paralympian athlete from Venezuela competing in category T37 sprinting events. Monterola qualified for the 2012 Summer Paralympics in the 100m, 200m and 400m sprints. He qualified for the finals of all three, winning the bronze medal in the 200m event.

== Career history ==
Monterola, who has cerebral palsy, was inspired to take up parasport by his cousin Keisa, who was an international pole vaulter. He missed the 2008 Summer Paralympics in Beijing due to an injury, but competed at the 2011 IPC Athletics World Championships in Christchurch. At the World Championships he entered both the 100m and 200m sprints in the T37 category, but did not achieve a podium finish. He finished the year by representing Venezuela at the 2011 Parapan American Games in Guadalajara, where he dominated his field winning the gold in all three sprint events, the 100m, 200m and 400m.

In 2012 he competed at his first Summer Paralympics, in London. He qualified for both the 100m and 200m T37 sprints as well as the T38 400m event. He qualified through the heats in all three events, but failed to finish the 400m and was disqualified form the 100m. In the 200m final Monterols set a regional record to finish in a time of 23.34, which saw him win the bronze medal.

The following year he competed at the 2013 IPC Athletics World Championships in Lyon. He again competed in the 100m and 200m events, finishing fourth in the 100m and third in the 200m to claim the bronze medal. Three more medals followed at the 2015 Parapan American Games in Toronto, bronze in the 100m and silvers in the 200m and 400m sprints.
