= Samuel Colmenares =

Venezuelan Paralympic athlete

Medal record

Paralympic athletics

Representing Venezuela

Paralympic Games
| Bronze medal – third place | 2008 Beijing | 400m T46 |

Parapan American Games
| Gold medal – first place | 2011 Guadalajara | 400m T46 |
| Gold medal – first place | 2011 Guadalajara | 800m T46 |
| Silver medal – second place | 2019 Lima | 400m T47 |

Samuel Colmenares (Aragua) is a Paralympic athlete from Venezuela competing mainly in category T46 sprint events.

He competed in the 2008 Summer Paralympics in Beijing, China. There he won a bronze medal in the men's 400 metres T46 event and went out in the first round of the men's 800 metres - T46 event
