= Jamaica at the 2011 Parapan American Games =

Sporting event delegation

Jamaica participated in the 2011 Parapan American Games.

== Medalists ==
Medal	Name	Sport	Event	Date
Gold	Alphanso Cunningham	Athletics	Men's discus throw F51/52/53	November 14
Silver	Alphanso Cunningham	Athletics	Men's javelin throw F52/53	November 15
Silver	Tanto Campbell	Athletics	Men's discus throw F54/55/56	November 16
Silver	Shane Hudson	Athletics	Men's 400 metres T46	November 18
Silver	Sylvia Grant	Athletics	Women's javelin throw F54-58	November 18

== Athletics ==
Jamaica sent five male athletes and one female athlete to compete.

== See also ==
- Jamaica at the 2011 Pan American Games
- Jamaica at the 2012 Summer Paralympics
