= Powerlifting at the 2011 Parapan American Games =

- Venue: Weightlifting Forum
- Dates: 17 – 19 November 2011

Powerlifting was contested at the 2011 Parapan American Games from November 17 to 19 at the Weightlifting Forum in Guadalajara, Mexico.

== Medal summary ==
=== Medal table ===
Rank	Nation	Gold	Silver	Bronze	Total
1	Mexico	4	2	0	6
2	Cuba	1	2	0	3
3	Colombia	1	0	0	1
4	Brazil	0	2	2	4
5	United States	0	0	2	2
6	Chile	0	0	1	1
6	Venezuela	0	0	1	1
Totals (7 entries)		6	6	6	18

=== Medal events ===
==== Women ====
Event	Gold	Silver	Bronze
Women's lightweight	Amalia Pérez; Mexico; PR	Laura Cerero; Mexico	Wiunawis Hernandez; Venezuela
Women's middleweight	Perla Bárcenas; Mexico; PR	Catalina Diaz; Mexico	Mary Stack; United States

==== Men ====
Event	Gold	Silver	Bronze
Men's lightweight	Cesar Rubio; Cuba; PR	Bruno Carra; Brazil	Alexandre Gouveia; Brazil
Men's middleweight	Janier Cantillo; Colombia; PR	Luis Perea; Cuba	Juan Carlos Garrido; Chile
Men's heavyweight	Porofirio Arredondo; Mexico; PR	Oniger Drake; Cuba	Luiz Novaes; Brazil
Men's super heavyweight	Jose de Jesus Castillo; Mexico; PR	Rodrigo Marques; Brazil	Ahmed Shafik; United States
