= Peru at the 2011 Parapan American Games =

Sporting event delegation

Peru participated in the 2011 Parapan American Games.

== Medalists ==
Medal	Name	Sport	Event	Date
Bronze	Pompilio Falconi-Alvarez	Athletics	Men's discus throw F35/36	November 18

== Athletics ==
Peru will send seven male athletes to compete.

== Cycling ==
Peru will send one male athlete to compete in the road cycling tournament

== Powerlifting ==
Peru will send three male athletes to compete.

== Table tennis ==
Peru will send two male and two female table tennis players to compete.

== Wheelchair basketball ==
Peru will send a team of ten female athletes to compete in the women's tournament.

== Wheelchair tennis ==
Peru will send two male and one female athlete to compete.

== See also ==
- Peru at the 2011 Pan American Games
- Peru at the 2012 Summer Paralympics
