= Boccia at the 2011 Parapan American Games =

- Venue: Revolución Gym
- Dates: November 13 - November 16
- Competitors: 73 from 7 nations

Boccia will be contested at the 2011 Parapan American Games from November 13 to 16 at the Revolución Gym in Guadalajara, Mexico.

== Medal summary ==
=== Medal table ===
Rank	Nation	Gold	Silver	Bronze	Total
1	Canada	2	1	2	5
2	Brazil	1	0	2	3
3	Mexico	1	0	0	1
4	Argentina	0	2	0	2
5	Colombia	0	1	0	1
Totals (5 entries)		4	4	4	12

=== Medal events ===
Event	Gold	Silver	Bronze
Individual BC1	Eduardo Ventura; Mexico	Eliana Henao; Colombia	José Carlos Chagas; Brazil
Individual BC2	Adam Dukovich; Canada	Pablo Cortez; Argentina	Dave Richer; Canada
Individual BC3	Paul Gauthier; Canada	Maria Belén Ruiz; Argentina	Clodoaldo Massardi; Brazil
Individual BC4	Fábio Moraes; Brazil	Marco Dispaltro; Canada	Josh Vandervies; Canada
