= Juan Ignacio Reyes =

Mexican Paralympic swimmer (born 1981)

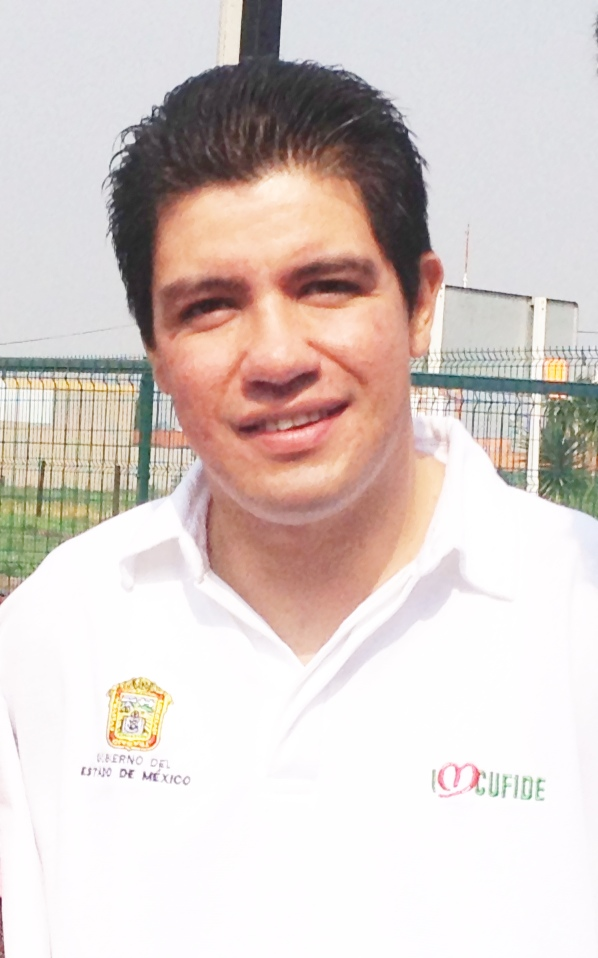

Personal information
- Full name: Juan Ignacio Reyes González
- Born: 15 December 1981 (age 44) Mexico City, Mexico
- Height: 1.80 m (5 ft 11 in)

Sport
- Country: Mexico
- Sport: Paralympic swimming
- Disability: Purpura fulminans survivor
- Disability class: S4, SB2, SM3
- Retired: 2017
Medal record
Paralympic swimming
Representing Mexico
Paralympic Games
Gold medal – first place	2000 Sydney	50m backstroke S4
Gold medal – first place	2000 Sydney	150m individual medley SM3
Gold medal – first place	2004 Athens	50m backstroke S4
Gold medal – first place	2008 Beijing	50m backstroke S4
Gold medal – first place	2012 London	50m backstroke S4
Silver medal – second place	2000 Sydney	50m butterfly S4
Bronze medal – third place	2004 Athens	150m individual medley SM3
World Championships
Gold medal – first place	1998 Christchurch	50m backstroke S4
Gold medal – first place	2002 Mar del Plata	50m backstroke S4
Gold medal – first place	2002 Mar del Plata	50m butterfly S4
Gold medal – first place	2002 Mar del Plata	150m individual medley SM3
Gold medal – first place	2006 Durban	50m backstroke S4
Gold medal – first place	2006 Durban	50m butterfly S4
Gold medal – first place	2010 Eindhoven	50m backstroke S4
Gold medal – first place	2013 Montreal	50m backstroke S4
Silver medal – second place	2006 Durban	150m individual medley SM3
Silver medal – second place	2006 Durban	4x50m freestyle relay
Silver medal – second place	2010 Eindhoven	150m individual medley SM3
Silver medal – second place	2015 Glasgow	50m backstroke S4
Bronze medal – third place	2010 Eindhoven	50m butterfly S4
Parapan American Games
Gold medal – first place	2003 Mar del Plata	50m backstroke S4
Gold medal – first place	2003 Mar del Plata	50m butterfly S4
Gold medal – first place	2015 Toronto	50m backstroke S4
Silver medal – second place	2003 Mar del Plata	50m freestyle S4
Silver medal – second place	2003 Mar del Plata	200m freestyle S4
Silver medal – second place	2011 Guadalajara	50m freestyle S4
Silver medal – second place	2011 Guadalajara	4x50m freestyle relay
Silver medal – second place	2015 Toronto	150m individual medley SM4
Bronze medal – third place	2011 Guadalajara	50m backstroke S5
Bronze medal – third place	2011 Guadalajara	50m butterfly S5
Bronze medal – third place	2015 Toronto	50m freestyle S4
Bronze medal – third place	2015 Toronto	50m butterfly S5

Juan Ignacio Reyes González (born 15 December 1981) is a Mexican former Paralympic swimmer who is a five-time Paralympic champion, eight-time World champion and three-time Parapan American Games champion. At age five he lost both his arms and his left leg due to a serious illness. He was classified S4, SB2, SM3.

He is a former world record holder for his classification in the 50m backstroke and 100m backstroke events.
