= Aarón Gordian =

Mexican Paralympic athlete (born 1964)

Medal record

Paralympic athletics

Representing Mexico

Paralympic Games
Silver medal – second place	2004 Athens	5000m T54
Bronze medal – third place	1988 Seoul	200m 4

Parapan American Games
Gold medal – first place	2011 Guadalajara	1500m T54
Gold medal – first place	2011 Guadalajara	5000m T54
Gold medal – first place	2011 Guadalajara	Marathon T54
Silver medal – second place	2007 Rio de Janeiro	1500m T54
Silver medal – second place	2007 Rio de Janeiro	5000m T54
Bronze medal – third place	2007 Rio de Janeiro	800m T54

Aarón Gordian Martínez (born 4 May 1964 in Mexico City) is a paralympic athlete from Mexico competing mainly in category T54 wheelchair racing events.

Aaron has competed in multiple events at seven Paralympics between 1984 and 2008 inclusive. His medals have come in the 200m in 1988 a bronze and a silver in the 5000m in 2004, while the distances raced range from 100m up to marathon.
