= Perla Bárcenas =

Mexican Paralympic powerlifter

Personal information
- Born: May 13, 1971 (age 55) Mexico City, Mexico

Sport
- Country: Mexico
- Sport: Paralympic powerlifting
Medal record
Paralympic Games
Silver medal – second place	2000 Sydney	75 kg
Bronze medal – third place	2008 Beijing	82.5 kg
Bronze medal – third place	2012 London	+82.5 kg
World Championships
Bronze medal – third place	2017 Mexico City	+86 kg
Bronze medal – third place	2021 Tbilisi	+86 kg
Parapan American Games
Gold medal – first place	2011 Guadalajara	Women's middleweight
Gold medal – first place	2015 Toronto	73kg, 79kg, 86kg and +86kg
Gold medal – first place	2019 Lima	79kg and 86kg combined

Perla Patricia Bárcenas is a Mexican Paralympic powerlifter. She represented Mexico at the Summer Paralympics in 2000, 2008, 2012, 2016 and 2021 and she won three medals. She won the silver medal in the women's 75 kg event at the 2000 Summer Paralympics in Sydney, Australia, the bronze medal in the women's 82.5 kg event in 2008 and the bronze medal in the women's +82.5 kg event in 2012.

In 2016, Bárcenas finished in 4th place in the women's 79 kg event at the 2016 Summer Paralympics held in Rio de Janeiro, Brazil. At the 2017 World Para Powerlifting Championships held in Mexico City, Mexico, she won the bronze medal in the women's 86+ kg event.

Bárcenas finished in 4th place in the women's +86 kg event at the 2020 Summer Paralympics held in Tokyo, Japan. A few months later, she won the bronze medal in her event at the 2021 World Para Powerlifting Championships held in Tbilisi, Georgia.
