= Yoldani Silva =

Venezuelan Paralympic athlete

Medal record

Track and field (athletics)

Representing Venezuela

Paralympic Games
Silver medal – second place	2008 Beijing	4x100m relay T11-13

Parapan American Games
Gold medal – first place	2011 Guadalajara	100m T12

Yoldani Silva is a Paralympian athlete from Venezuela competing mainly in category T12 sprint events.

Yoldani competed in the T12 100m at the 2008 Summer Paralympics in Beijing, he also went on to win a silver medal with his Venezuelan teammates in the T11-13 4 × 100 m behind host nation China.
