= Salvador Hernández =

Mexican Paralympic athlete (born 1973)

Salvador Hernández Mondragón
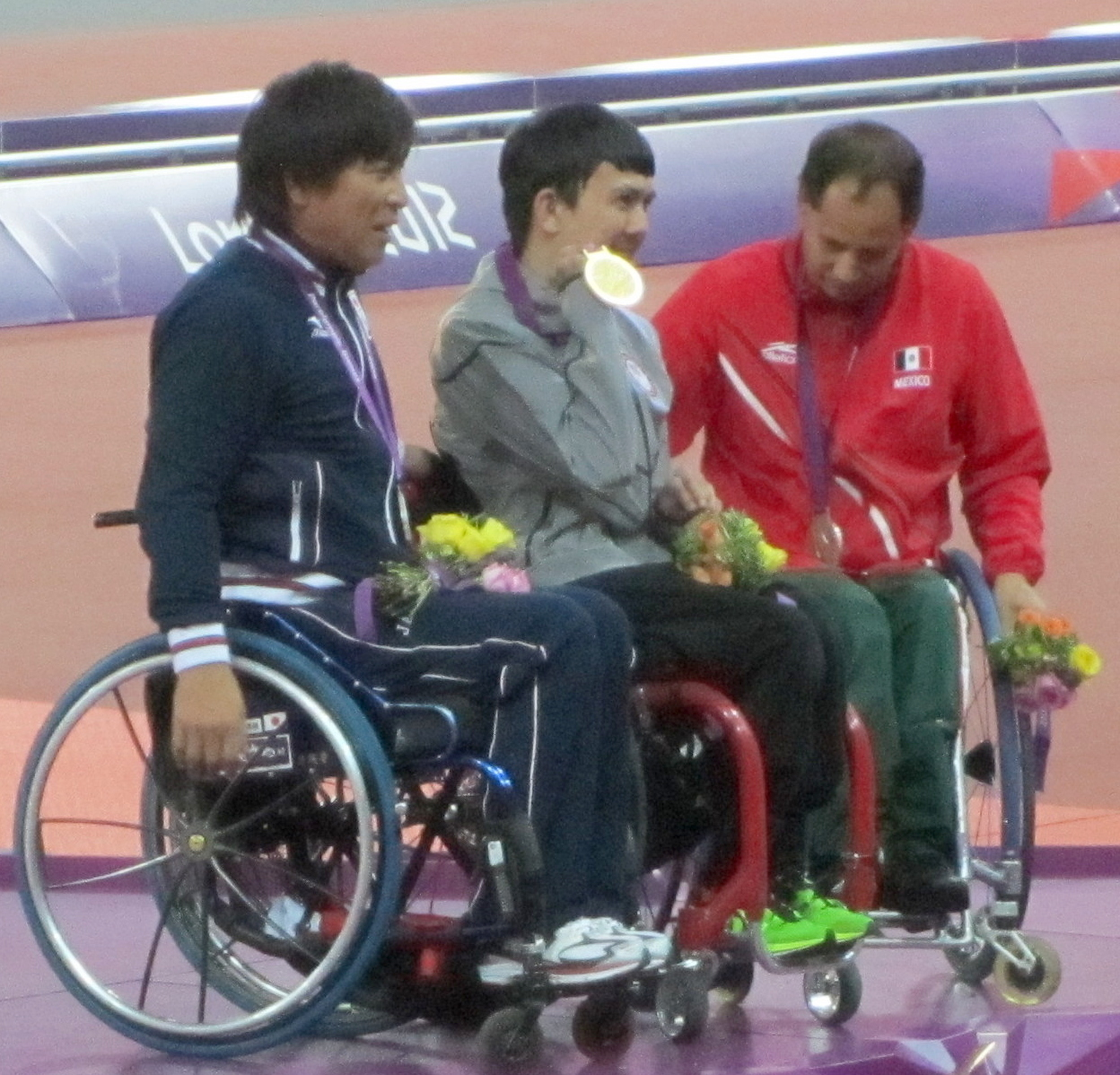
- Hernández (right) at the 2012 Summer Paralympics in London.

Personal information
- Nationality: Mexican
- Born: 31 December 1973 (age 52)

Sport
- Country: Mexico
- Sport: Athletics
- Event: sprints
Medal record
Men's paralympic athletics
Representing Mexico
Paralympic Games
Gold medal – first place	2000 Sydney	200 m T52
Gold medal – first place	2000 Sydney	400 m T52
Gold medal – first place	2004 Athens	100 m T52
Silver medal – second place	2000 Sydney	100 m T52
Silver medal – second place	2004 Athens	200 m T52
Silver medal – second place	2012 London	100 m T52
Bronze medal – third place	2012 London	200 m T52
Bronze medal – third place	2016 Rio	100 m T52
World Championships
Gold medal – first place	2011 Christchurch	100 m T52
Silver medal – second place	2013 Lyon	100 m T52
Silver medal – second place	2015 Doha	100 m T52
Silver medal – second place	2024 Kobe	100 m T52
Parapan American Games
Gold medal – first place	2011 Guadalajara	100 m T52
Gold medal – first place	2011 Guadalajara	400 m T52
Silver medal – second place	2011 Guadalajara	200 m T52
Silver medal – second place	2015 Toronto	200 m T52
Silver medal – second place	2023 Santiago	100 m T52
Bronze medal – third place	2015 Toronto	400 m T52

Salvador Hernández Mondragón (born December 31, 1973) is an athlete and Paralympian from Morelia, Michoacán, Mexico competing mainly in category T51/T52 wheelchair racing events.

== Career ==
He competed in the 1996 Summer Paralympics in Atlanta, United States. There he finished seventh in the men's 1500 metres T51 event, finished seventh in the men's 100 metres T51 event, finished fifth in the men's 200 metres T51 event, finished fourth in the men's 400 metres T51 event, finished eighth in the men's 800 metres T51 event and finished tenth in the men's 800 metres T51 event. He also competed at the 2000 Summer Paralympics in Sydney, Australia having been reclassified as a T52 athlete. He won a gold medal in the men's 200 metres T52 event, a gold medal in the men's 400 metres T52 event and a silver medal in the men's 100 metres T52 event. He also competed at the 2004 Summer Paralympics in Athens, Greece, a gold medal in the men's 100 metres T52 event, a silver medal in the men's 200 metres T52 event and finished sixth in the men's 400 metres T52 event. He competed in his fourth Paralympics in 2008 in Beijing, China. There he finished fourth in the men's 100 metres T52 event, finished seventh in the men's 200 metres T52 event and finished sixteenth in the men's 400 metres T52 event.

In 2016 Summer Paralympics he earned bronze medal in the 100 T52 final. Then he failed to reach the 400 meters final. He will be the flag bearer for Mexico at the 2024 Summer Paralympics along with Fabiola Ramírez.

Paralympics
Preceded by Arly Velásquez	Flagbearer for Mexico (with Fabiola Ramírez); Paris 2024	Succeeded by Arly Velásquez
