= Dominican Republic at the 2011 Parapan American Games =

The Dominican Republic participated in the 2011 Parapan American Games.

== Medalists ==
Medal	Name	Sport	Event	Date
Silver	Rodny Minier	Cycling	Men's road race C4-5	November 19
Bronze	Luis Alberto Vicioso Sanchez	Athletics	Men's discus throw F42	November 17

== Athletics ==
The Dominican Republic will send eight male and two female athletes to compete.

== Cycling ==
The Dominican Republic will send one male athlete to compete in the road cycling tournament.

== Swimming ==
The Dominican Republic will send one male and one female swimmer to compete.

== See also ==
- Dominican Republic at the 2011 Pan American Games
- Dominican Republic at the 2012 Summer Paralympics
