= Yazmith Bataz =

Mexican Paralympic athlete

Personal information
- Nicknames: Yaz, La Flaca
- National team: Mexico
- Born: Yazmith Bataz Carballo; April 5, 1972 (age 54) La Paz, Baja California Sur, Mexico
- Years active: 1999 – present
- Height: 1.56 m (5 ft 1 in)
- Weight: 43 kg (95 lb)

Sport
- Sport: Track and field
- Disability: Paraplegia
- Disability class: T54
- Event(s): 100 meters 200 meters 400 meters
Medal record
Paralympic athletics
Representing Mexico
Parapan American Games
| Gold medal – first place | 2011 Guadalajara | 100m T54 |
| Silver medal – second place | 2011 Guadalajara | 200m T54 |
| Silver medal – second place | 2011 Guadalajara | 400m T54 |

Yazmith Bataz Carballo (born April 5, 1972), is a Mexican athlete specializing in 100 meter, 200 meter, and 400 meter events.

== Career ==
Bataz has been a member of Mexico's athletics team at the Athens 2004, Beijing 2008, and London 2012 Paralympic Games.

At the continental level, she has represented her country at the 2007 Parapan American Games in Rio de Janeiro, where she received her first gold medal in the 100 meters. At the 2011 Parapan American Games in Guadalajara, she won a gold medal in the 100 meters and silver medals in the 200 meters and 400 meters within the T54 category for wheelchair racers.

On August 16, 2007, in Rio, Bataz broke the Pan-American record in the women's 100 meters T54 category with a time of 18:55. Additionally, in Guadalajara in 2011, she set a new continental record with 17:46 in the same event.

== Honors ==
In 2014, Yazmith Bataz received the Medal of Merit For a Person With a Disability from the government of her home state of Baja California Sur.

In 2016 she was appointed Municipal Coordinator for the Inclusion of Persons With Disabilities for her hometown of La Paz. She has represented the city at conferences of the National Human Rights Commission.
