= Sebastián Baldassarri =

Argentine Paralympic athlete

Medal record

Paralympic athletics

Representing Argentina

Paralympic Games
Silver medal – second place	2008 Beijing	Discus throw F11/12

Parapan American Games
Gold medal – first place	2011 Guadalajara	Discus throw F11
Silver medal – second place	2011 Guadalajara	Shot put F12
Bronze medal – third place	2015 Toronto	Discus throw F11

Sebastián Baldassarri is a Paralympian athlete from Argentina competing mainly in category F11 shot put events.

Baldassarri first competed in 2004 Summer Paralympics where he competed in the F11 shot put. Four years later in Beijing at the 2008 Summer Paralympics he competed in both the shot put and the discus, winning a silver medal in the F11/12 discus.
