= Cuba at the 2011 Parapan American Games =

Sporting event delegation

Cuba will participate in the 2011 Parapan American Games.

== Medalists ==
Medals by sport
Sport	1st place, gold medalist(s)	2nd place, silver medalist(s)	3rd place, bronze medalist(s)	Total
Athletics	14	7	7	28
Swimming	6	3	1	10
Judo	5	4	1	10
Powerlifting	1	2	0	3
Table tennis	1	0	2	3
Total	27	16	11	54

Medal	Name	Sport	Event	Date
Gold	Lorenzo Perez	Swimming	Men's 400 metres freestyle S6	November 13
Gold	Omara Durand	Athletics	Women's 400 metres T13	November 14
Gold	Yunerki Ortega	Swimming	Men's 50 metres freestyle S11	November 14
Gold	Ettiam Calderon	Athletics	Men's long jump F46	November 15
Gold	Daineris Mijan	Athletics	Women's 100 metres T12	November 15
Gold	Luis Felipe Gutierrez	Athletics	Men's 100 metres T13	November 15
Gold	Lorenzo Perez	Swimming	Men's 50 metres freestyle S6	November 15
Gold	Rafael Castillo	Swimming	Men's 50 metres butterfly S6	November 15
Gold	Yanelis M. Silva	Table tennis	Women's singles C1-3	November 15
Gold	Yunidis Castillo	Athletics	Women's 100 metres T46	November 16
Gold	Leonardo Diaz	Athletics	Men's discus throw F54/55/56	November 16
Gold	Yunerki Ortega	Swimming	Men's 100 metres breaststroke SB11	November 16
Gold	Omara Durand	Athletics	Women's 100 metres T13	November 17
Gold	Cesar Rubio	Powerlifting	Men's 48 kg - 56 kg	November 17
Gold	Lorenzo Perez	Swimming	Men's 100 metres freestyle S6	November 17
Gold	Luis Felipe Gutierrez	Athletics	Men's long jump F13	November 18
Gold	Daineris Mijan	Athletics	Women's 200 metres T12	November 18
Gold	Luis Felipe Gutierrez	Athletics	Men's 200 metres T13	November 18
Gold	Miguel Bartelemy Sablon	Athletics	Men's 400 metres T13	November 18
Gold	Lazaro Rashid	Athletics	Men's 1,500 metres T13	November 18
Gold	Yaumara Milan	Athletics	Women's discus throw F12	November 18
Gold	Lazaro Rashid	Athletics	Men's 800 metres T12	November 18
Gold	Yarima Brooks	Judo	Women's 70 kg	November 18
Gold	Jorge Hierrezuelo	Judo	Men's 90 kg	November 18
Gold	Yangaliny Jimenez	Judo	Men's +100 kg	November 18
Gold	Dalidaivis Rodriguez	Judo	Women's 63 kg	November 19
Gold	Victor L. Sanchez	Judo	Men's 66 kg	November 20
Silver	Julio Soria	Swimming	Men's 50 metres freestyle S13	November 14
Silver	Raciel Gonzalez Isidoria	Athletics	Men's 100 metres T46	November 15
Silver	Leonardo Diaz	Athletics	Men's javelin throw F54/55/56	November 15
Silver	Ettiam Calderon	Athletics	Men's 200 metres T46	November 17
Silver	Gerdan Fonseca	Athletics	Men's javelin throw F44	November 17
Silver	Luis Perea	Powerlifting	Men's 60 kg - 67.5 kg	November 17
Silver	Rafael Castillo	Swimming	Men's 100 metres freestyle S6	November 17
Silver	Angel Jimenez Cabeza	Athletics	Men's long jump F13	November 18
Silver	Arian Iznaga	Athletics	Men's 400 metres T11	November 18
Silver	Miguel Bartelemy Sablon	Athletics	Men's 800 metres T13	November 18
Silver	Oniger Jesus Drake	Powerlifting	Men's 75 kg - 82.5 kg	November 18
Silver	Gerardo Rodriguez	Judo	Men's 73 kg	November 19
Silver	Isao R. Cruz	Judo	Men's 81 kg	November 19
Silver	Julio Soria	Swimming	Men's 100 metres freestyle S13	November 19
Silver	Maria Gonzalez	Judo	Women's 48 kg	November 20
Silver	Sergio Arturo Perez	Judo	Men's 60 kg	November 20
Bronze	Yunerki Ortega	Swimming	Men's 100 metre backstroke S11	November 13
Bronze	Leonardo Diaz	Athletics	Men's shot put F54/55/56	November 14
Bronze	Franklin Oquendo Fonseca	Athletics	Men's discus throw F37/38	November 14
Bronze	Arian Iznaga	Athletics	Men's 100 metres T11	November 15
Bronze	Yunier Fernandez	Table tennis	Men's singles C1-2	November 15
Bronze	Erich Manso	Table tennis	Men's singles C10	November 15
Bronze	Arian Iznaga	Athletics	Men's 200 metres T11	November 16
Bronze	Lazaro Reus Fabian	Athletics	Men's 200 metres T12	November 16
Bronze	Erick Figueredo	Athletics	Men's shot put F32/33/34	November 16
Bronze	Erick Figueredo	Athletics	Men's discus throw F32/33/34	November 18
Bronze	Juan C. Cortada	Judo	Men's 100 kg	November 18

== Athletics ==
Cuba will send seventeen male and five female athletes to compete.

== Cycling ==
Cuba will send two male athletes to compete. One male athlete will compete in the road cycling tournament, while one male athlete will compete in the track cycling tournament.

== Judo ==
Cuba will send seven male and three female athletes to compete.

== Powerlifting ==
Cuba will send six male athletes to compete.

== Swimming ==
Cuba will send four male swimmers to compete.

== Table tennis ==
Cuba will send four male and one female table tennis player to compete.

== See also ==
- Cuba at the 2011 Pan American Games
- Cuba at the 2012 Summer Paralympics
