= Table tennis at the 2011 Parapan American Games =

Para table tennis at the 2011 Parapan American Games
- Venue: CODE II Gymnasium
- Dates: 13 – 18 November 2011

Table tennis was contested at the 2011 Parapan American Games from November 13 to 18 at the CODE II Gymnasium in Guadalajara, Mexico.

== Medal table ==
Rank	Nation	Gold	Silver	Bronze	Total
1	Brazil	12	6	6	24
2	Mexico	3	4	4	11
3	Argentina	2	2	4	8
4	United States	1	4	1	6
5	Canada	1	2	0	3
6	Cuba	1	0	2	3
7	Chile	1	0	1	2
8	Venezuela	0	2	1	3
9	Colombia	0	1	0	1
Totals (9 entries)		21	21	19	61

== Medal events ==
=== Men ===
Event	Gold	Silver	Bronze
Men's singles C1-2	Iranildo Conceição; Brazil	Ronaldo Pinheiro; Brazil	Yunier Fernandez; Cuba
Men's singles C3	Gabriel Copola; Argentina	David Andrade; Brazil	Welder Knaf; Brazil
Men's singles C4	Ezequiel Babes; Brazil	Ivanildo Pessoa; Brazil	Edson Gomez; Venezuela
Men's singles C5	Claudiomiro Segatto; Brazil	Andre Scott; United States	Ernesto Rodriguez; Argentina
Men's singles C6	Carlo di Franco; Brazil	Victor Reyes; Mexico	Tomas Devito; Argentina
Men's singles C7	Cristian Dettoni; Chile	Jose Vargas; Colombia	Pablo Ferro; Argentina
Men's singles C8	Ian Kent; Canada	Paulo Salmin; Brazil	Francisco Melos; Brazil
Men's singles C9	Tahl Leibovitz; United States	Miguel Vazquez; Mexico	Guilherme Riggio; Brazil
Men's singles C10	Carlos Carbinatti; Brazil	Rene Dominguez; Mexico	Erich Manso; Cuba
Men's singles C11	Lucas Martins; Brazil	Denisos Martinez; Venezuela	Juliano Fiorentin; Brazil
Men's team C1-3	Brazil (BRA); David Andrade; Welder Knaf; Iranildo Conceição; Ronaldo Pinheiro	Argentina (ARG); Gonzalo Acosta; Carlos Duarte; Fernando Eberhardt	Mexico (MEX); Jesús Sánchez; Gabriel Zaldivar
Men's team C4-5	Argentina (ARG); Gabriel Copola; Mauro Depergola; Ernesto Rodriguez	Brazil (BRA); Ezequiel Babes; Ecildo Lopes; Ivanildo Pessoa; Claudomiro Segatto	United States (USA); Stuart Caplin; Andre Scott; James Segrest; Emmanuel Siu
Men's team C6-8	Brazil (BRA); Carlo di Franco; João Martins; Francisco Melo; Paulo Salmin	Canada (CAN); Ian Kent; Masoud Mojtahed	Chile (CHI); Cristian Dettoni; Ruperto Morales; Juan Sepulveda
Men's team C9-10	Brazil (BRA); Carlos Carbinatti; Alexandre Lazarin; Edmilson Pinheiro; Guilherme Riggo	United States (USA); Tahl Leibovitz; Wayne Lo	Mexico (MEX); Rene Dominguez; Miguel Vazquez

=== Women ===
Event	Gold	Silver	Bronze
Women's singles C1-3	Yanelis Silva; Cuba	Pamela Fontaine; United States	Maria Sigala; Mexico
Women's singles C4	Joyce de Oliveira; Brazil	María Arenales; Mexico	Martha Verdín; Mexico
Women's singles C5	María Paredes; Mexico	Marta Makishi; Argentina	Maria Pereira; Brazil
Women's singles C7-9	Jane Rodriguez; Brazil	Stephanie Chan; Canada	Giselle Muñoz; Argentina
Women's singles C11	Iliane Faust; Brazil	Zulay Colmenares; Venezuela	Not awarded
Women's team C1-3	Mexico (MEX); Alma Padilla; Maria Sigala	United States (USA); Pamela Fontaine; Tara Profitt	Brazil (BRA); Rosângela Azevedo; Luana Couto
Women's team C4-5	Mexico (MEX); María Arenales; María Paredes; Martha Verdín	Brazil (BRA); Joyce de Oliveira; Maria Pereira	Not awarded

== See also ==
- Table tennis at the 2011 Pan American Games
