= José de Jesús Castillo =

Mexican paralympic powerlifter (born 1984)

Personal information
- Full name: José de Jesús Castillo Castillo
- Nationality: Mexican
- Born: 24 August 1984 (age 41) Zapopan, Jalisco

Sport
- Country: Mexico
- Sport: Powerlifting
Medal record
Powerlifting
Representing Mexico
Paralympic Games
Bronze medal – third place	2016 Rio de Janeiro	Men's 97 kg
Bronze medal – third place	2024 Paris	Men's 107 kg
Parapan American Games
Gold medal – first place	2011 Guadalajara	Men's 97 kg
Gold medal – first place	2015 Toronto	Men's 97 kg
Gold medal – first place	2019 Lima	Men's 107 kg
Bronze medal – third place	2023 Santiago	Men's 107 kg

José de Jesús Castillo Castillo (24 August 1984) is a Mexican paralympic powerlifter. He competed at the 2016 Summer Paralympics in the powerlifting competition, winning the bronze medal in the men's 97 kg event. Castillo also competed in the powerlifting at the 2020 Summer Paralympics.
