= Judo at the 2011 Parapan American Games =

Judo competition

Paralympic judo at the 2011 Parapan American Games
- Venue: Multipurpose Gymnasium
- Dates: 18 – 20 November 2011

Judo was contested at the 2011 Parapan American Games from November 18 to 20 at the Multipurpose Gymnasium in Guadalajara, Mexico.

== Medal summary ==
=== Medal table ===
Rank	Nation	Gold	Silver	Bronze	Total
1	Cuba	5	4	1	10
2	Brazil	2	4	1	7
3	Mexico	1	2	0	3
4	United States	1	1	2	4
5	Argentina	1	0	3	4
6	Colombia	1	0	0	1
7	Venezuela	0	0	5	5
8	Canada	0	0	3	3
Totals (8 entries)		11	11	15	37

=== Medal events ===
==== Women ====
Event	Gold	Silver	Bronze
48 kg	Karla Ferreira; Brazil	Maria Gonzalez; Cuba	Paula Gomez; Argentina
52 kg	Michele Ferreira; Brazil	Cynthia Paige Simon; United States	Not awarded
63 kg	Dalidaivis Rodriguez; Cuba	Daniele Bernardes; Brazil	Not awarded
70 kg	Yarima Brooks; Cuba	Lenia Ruvalcaba; Mexico	Not awarded
+70 kg	Giovana Pilla; Brazil	Katie Davis; United States	Not awarded

==== Men ====
Event	Gold	Silver	Bronze
60 kg	Juan Castellanos; Colombia	Sergio Perez; Cuba	Ron Hawthorne; United States
60 kg	Juan Castellanos; Colombia	Sergio Perez; Cuba	Justin Karn; Canada
66 kg	Victor Sanchez; Cuba	Magno Marques; Brazil	Marcos Falcón; Venezuela
66 kg	Victor Sanchez; Cuba	Magno Marques; Brazil	Joshua Farra; United States
73 kg	Eduardo Avila; Mexico	Gerardo Rodriguez; Cuba	Mauricio Briceño; Venezuela
73 kg	Eduardo Avila; Mexico	Gerardo Rodriguez; Cuba	Rodolfo Ramírez; Argentina
81 kg	José Effron; Argentina	Isao Cruz Alonso; Cuba	Reinaldo Carvallo; Venezuela
81 kg	José Effron; Argentina	Isao Cruz Alonso; Cuba	Harlley Pereira; Brazil
90 kg	Jorge Hierrezuelo; Cuba	Alejandro González; Mexico	Hector Espinoza; Venezuela
90 kg	Jorge Hierrezuelo; Cuba	Alejandro González; Mexico	Jorge Lencina; Argentina
100 kg	Myles Porter; United States	Antônio Tenório; Brazil	Juan Cortada; Cuba
100 kg	Myles Porter; United States	Antônio Tenório; Brazil	Timothy Rees; Canada
+100 kg	Yangaliny Jimenez; Cuba	Wilians Silva; Brazil	William Montero; Venezuela
+100 kg	Yangaliny Jimenez; Cuba	Wilians Silva; Brazil	Tony Walby; Canada
