= Francisco Coelho =

Portuguese weightlifter

Personal information
- Nationality: Portuguese
- Born: 16 January 1962 (age 63)

Sport
- Sport: Weightlifting

Francisco Coelho (born 16 January 1962) is a Portuguese weightlifter. He competed in the men's middle heavyweight event at the 1984 Summer Olympics.
