= Daniela Giménez =

Argentine Paralympic swimmer

Personal information
- Nicknames: Dani, Chaco
- Born: 20 August 1992 (age 33) Resistencia, Chaco, Argentina
- Home town: Buenos Aires, Argentina
- Height: 1.58 m (5 ft 2 in)
- Weight: 55 kg (121 lb)

Sport
- Country: Argentina
- Sport: Paralympic swimming
- Disability class: S9, SB9, SM9
- Club: Club Villa Pearson
- Coached by: Vicente Lopez; Juan Manuel Zucconi
Medal record
Paralympic swimming
Representing Argentina
Parapan American Games
Gold medal – first place	2011 Guadalajara	Women's 50m freestyle S9
Gold medal – first place	2011 Guadalajara	Women's 100m breaststroke SB9
Gold medal – first place	2015 Toronto	Women's 50m freestyle S9
Gold medal – first place	2015 Toronto	Women's 100m breaststroke SB9
Gold medal – first place	2019 Lima	Women's 100m breaststroke SB9
Gold medal – first place	2019 Lima	Women's 200m individual medley SM9
Silver medal – second place	2015 Toronto	Women's 100m freestyle S9
Silver medal – second place	2019 Lima	Women's 50m freestyle S9
Silver medal – second place	2019 Lima	Women's 100m freestyle S9
Silver medal – second place	2019 Lima	Women's 100m butterfly S9
Bronze medal – third place	2011 Guadalajara	Women's 100m butterfly S9
Bronze medal – third place	2015 Toronto	Women's 200m individual medley SM10
World Championships
Gold medal – first place	2017 Mexico City	Women's 100m breaststroke SB9
Bronze medal – third place	2019 London	Women's 100m breaststroke SB9

Daniela Giménez (born 20 August 1992) is an Argentine Paralympic swimmer who competes in international level events, she mostly participates in breaststroke events. She competed at the 2008 Summer Paralympics, 2012 Summer Paralympics, 2016 Summer Paralympics, and 2020 Summer Paralympics.

== Life ==
She was born without her left hand.

She studied at Pontifical Catholic University of Argentina .

She competed at the 2007 Parapan American Games, winning a bronze medal, 2011 Parapan American Games, where she won two gold medals, 2015 Parapan American Games, 2018 World Para Swimming World Series, and 2019 Parapan American Games.
