= Nicaragua at the 2011 Parapan American Games =

Sporting event delegation

Nicaragua will participate in the 2011 Parapan American Games.

== Athletics ==
Nicaragua will send four male athletes to compete.

== Goalball ==
Nicaragua will send one team of six athletes to compete in the men's tournament.

== Powerlifting ==
Nicaragua will send one male athlete to compete.

== See also ==
- Nicaragua at the 2011 Pan American Games
- Nicaragua at the 2012 Summer Paralympics
