= Guillermo Marro =

Argentine Paralympic swimmer

Personal information
- Full name: Guillermo Osvaldo Marro
- Nicknames: Magcin, Guille, El Delfin
- Born: 1 July 1983 (age 42) Pergamino, Argentina
- Height: 1.69 m (5 ft 7 in)

Sport
- Country: Argentina
- Sport: Paralympic swimming
- Disability: Arthrogryposis
- Disability class: S7
Medal record
Paralympic swimming
Representing Argentina
Paralympic Games
Silver medal – second place	2004 Athens	100m backstroke S7
Bronze medal – third place	2000 Sydney	Men's 100m backstroke S7
Bronze medal – third place	2008 Beijing	100m backstroke S7
World Championships
Silver medal – second place	2006 Durban	Men's 100m backstroke S7
Bronze medal – third place	2002 Mar del Plata	Men's 100m backstroke S7
Parapan American Games
Gold medal – first place	2003 Mar del Plata	Men's 50m freestyle S7
Gold medal – first place	2003 Mar del Plata	Men's 100m backstroke S7
Gold medal – first place	2011 Guadalajara	Men's 100m backstroke S7
Silver medal – second place	2003 Mar del Plata	Men's 50m butterfly S7
Bronze medal – third place	2015 Toronto	Men's 100m backstroke S7

Guillermo Osvaldo Marro (born 1 July 1983) is an Argentine Paralympic swimmer who competes in international elite events. He specialises in backstroke swimming. He is a triple Paralympic medalist, double World medalist and a triple Parapan American Games champion. He is highly regarded as Argentina's most successful Paralympic swimmer.

In 2014, Marro became the first Argentine Paralympic swimmer to cross the English Channel, he completed the swimming course in over fourteen hours. He swam as part of a team with Scott Patterson and Pedro Rangel who were double leg amputees, Moisés Fuentes who is a paraplegic and Enrique Guerrero who has a below the knee amputation.
