= Yadira Soturno =

Venezuelan Paralympic athlete

Personal information
- Full name: Yadira Del Carmen Soturno Diaz
- Nickname: La Chica Invisible
- Born: 18 June 1970 (age 56) Maracaibo, Venezuela

Sport
- Country: Venezuela
- Sport: Paralympic athletics
- Disability: Polio survivor
- Disability class: T53
Medal record
Paralympic athletics
Representing Venezuela
Parapan American Games
Bronze medal – third place	2011 Guadalajara	Women's 100m T53
Bronze medal – third place	2011 Guadalajara	Women's 200m T53
Bronze medal – third place	2011 Guadalajara	Women's 400m T53

Yadira Del Carmen Soturno Diaz (born 18 June 1970) is a Venezuelan paralympic athlete who competes in sprinting events in international level events. She was Venezuela's first female athlete to compete at the Paralympic Games when she competed at the 2008 Summer Paralympics.
