= Colombia at the 2011 Parapan American Games =

Sporting event delegation

Colombia participated in the 2011 Parapan American Games.

== Medalists ==
Medals by sport
Sport	1st place, gold medalist(s)	2nd place, silver medalist(s)	3rd place, bronze medalist(s)	Total
Swimming	6	8	4	18
Athletics	6	7	3	16
Cycling	4	4	4	12
Judo	1	0	0	1
Powerlifting	1	0	0	1
Wheelchair tennis	0	1	1	2
Boccia	0	1	0	1
Table tennis	0	1	0	1
Wheelchair basketball	0	1	0	1
Football 5-a-side	0	0	1	1
Total	18	23	13	54

Medal	Name	Sport	Event	Date
Gold	Daniel Giraldo Correa	Swimming	Men's 200 metres individual medley SM12	November 13
Gold	José Flórez	Athletics	Men's 100 metres T36	November 14
Gold	Daniel Giraldo Correa	Swimming	Men's 50 metres freestyle S12	November 14
Gold	Nelson Crispín	Swimming	Men's 100 metres breaststroke SB6	November 14
Gold	Elkin Serna	Athletics	Men's 5,000 metres T12	November 15
Gold	Daniel Giraldo Correa	Swimming	Men's 100 metres breaststroke SB12	November 15
Gold	Edwin Rodriguez Gonzales	Athletics	Men's shot put F12	November 16
Gold	Yanivé Torres	Athletics	Women's shot put F54/55/56	November 16
Gold	Esneider Muñoz	Cycling	Men's individual track pursuit C1-3	November 16
Gold	Naiver Ome Ramos	Swimming	Women's 100 metres breaststroke SB4	November 16
Gold	José Flórez	Athletics	Men's 200 metres T36	November 17
Gold	Jainer Cantillo	Powerlifting	Men's 60 kg - 67.5 kg	November 17
Gold	Mauricio Valencia	Athletics	Men's discus throw F32/33/34	November 18
Gold	Nelson Javier Serna; Sebastian Durango	Cycling	Men's road race B	November 19
Gold	Esneider Muñoz	Cycling	Men's road race C1-3	November 19
Gold	Néstor Javier Ayala	Cycling	Mixed road race T1-2	November 19
Gold	Daniel Giraldo Correa	Swimming	Men's 100 metres freestyle S12	November 19
Gold	Juan P. Castellanos	Judo	Men's 60 kg	November 20
Silver	Diego Germán Dueñas	Cycling	Mixed road time trial C1-5	November 13
Silver	Daniel Londono	Swimming	Men's 400 metres freestyle S6	November 13
Silver	Juan Buitrago Blanco	Swimming	Men's 100 metres backstroke S11	November 13
Silver	Edwin Rodriguez Gonzales	Athletics	Men's discus throw F11	November 14
Silver	Mario Bolanos Roa	Swimming	Men's 100 metres breaststroke SB6	November 14
Silver	Nelson Javier Serna; Sebastian Durango	Cycling	Men's individual track pursuit B	November 15
Silver	Nelson Crispín	Swimming	Men's 50 metres freestyle S6	November 15
Silver	Nelson Crispín	Swimming	Men's 50 metres butterfly S6	November 15
Silver	Jose D. Vargas	Table tennis	Men's singles C7	November 15
Silver	Mauricio Valencia	Athletics	Men's shot put F32/33/34	November 16
Silver	Fabio Gutierrez Torres	Athletics	Men's 800 metres T36	November 16
Silver	Eliana Henao	Boccia	Individual BC1	November 16
Silver	Alvaro Galviz	Cycling	Men's individual track pursuit C1-3	November 16
Silver	Moisés Fuentes	Swimming	Men's 100 metres breaststroke SB4	November 16
Silver	Brayan Urbano Herrera	Swimming	Men's 100 metres breaststroke SB11	November 16
Silver	Daniel Londono	Swimming	Men's 200 metres individual medley SM6	November 16
Silver	Sairo Moises Fernandez Lopez	Athletics	Men's 800 metres T54	November 17
Silver	Neydy Aguilera	Athletics	Women's 100 metres T37	November 18
Silver	Fabio Gutierrez Torres	Athletics	Men's 400 metres T36	November 18
Silver	Elkin Serna	Athletics	Men's 1,500 metres T13	November 18
Silver	Angélica Bernal; Johana Martínez	Wheelchair tennis	Women's doubles	November 18
Silver	Eliecer Orjuela; William Rojas	Cycling	Men's road race B	November 19
Silver	Team Colombia	Wheelchair basketball	Men	November 19
Bronze	Néstor Javier Ayala	Cycling	Mixed road time trial T1-2	November 13
Bronze	Paula Lara Rodriguez	Swimming	Women's 50 metres freestyle S3	November 14
Bronze	Jose Alexis Belizario Angulo	Athletics	Men's long jump F11	November 16
Bronze	Diego Germán Dueñas	Cycling	Men's individual track pursuit C4-5	November 16
Bronze	Eliecer Orjuela; William Rojas	Cycling	Men's 1,000 metres track time trial B	November 16
Bronze	Leider Lemus	Swimming	Men's 100 metres breaststroke SB11	November 16
Bronze	Yesenia Restrepo	Athletics	Women's shot put F12	November 17
Bronze	Angélica Bernal	Wheelchair tennis	Women's singles	November 17
Bronze	Fernando Mina Cortes	Athletics	Men's javelin throw F57/58	November 18
Bronze	Paula Lara Rodriguez	Swimming	Women's 100 metres freestyle S3	November 18
Bronze	Alvaro Galviz	Cycling	Men's road race C1-3	November 19
Bronze	Santiago Londono Alvarez	Swimming	Men's 100 metres backstroke S6	November 19
Bronze	Team Colombia	Football 5-a-side	Men	November 20

== Athletics ==
Colombia will send eighteen male and seven female athletes to compete.

== Boccia ==
Colombia will send two male and five female athletes to compete.

== Cycling ==
Colombia will send fourteen male athletes to compete. Eight male athletes will compete in the road cycling tournament, while six male athletes will compete in the track cycling tournament.

== Football 5-a-side ==
Colombia will send a team of eight athletes to compete.

== Judo ==
Colombia will send three male athletes to compete.

== Powerlifting ==
Colombia will send three male and one female athlete to compete.

== Sitting volleyball ==
Colombia will send a team of twelve athletes to compete.

== Swimming ==
Colombia will send ten male and four female swimmers to compete.

== Table tennis ==
Colombia will send three male and one female table tennis player to compete.

== Wheelchair basketball ==
Colombia will send a team of twelve male athletes to compete in the men's tournament.

== Wheelchair tennis ==
Colombia will send two male and two female athletes to compete.

== See also ==
- Colombia at the 2011 Pan American Games
- Colombia at the 2012 Summer Paralympics
