= 2011 Parapan American Games =

International multi-sport event for athletes with disabilities

IV Parapan American Games
- Host: Guadalajara, Mexico
- Motto: The Party of the Americas (Spanish: La Fiesta de las Américas)
- Nations: 24
- Athletes: 1,355
- Events: 276 in 13 sports
- Opening: November 12
- Closing: November 20
- Opened by: Bernardo de la Garza
- Main venue: Telmex Athletics Stadium

The 4th Parapan American Games took place from November 12 to 20 in Guadalajara, Mexico. The Games are an international multi-sport event for athletes with a physical disability. The Games were held 20 days after the 2011 Pan American Games began.

== Infrastructure and Budget ==
A Guadalajara reporter said "The area is rough. It's just this side of being on the wrong side of the tracks. But it's not far from the theatre area or the downtown with some of the nicer, old colonial hotels, and the city hopes that the Villa Panamericana can rejuvenate the downtown historical area."

The city would have 22,000 hotel rooms by 2011, a new bus rapid transit system, Macrobús, that would run through the Calzada Independencia, and the Centro Cultural Metropolitano, an ambitious project of the Universidad de Guadalajara, which includes a 10,000-seat performing arts auditorium (Auditorio Telmex), the new public library of the state of Jalisco, among other buildings.

== Participating nations ==
24 nations will be participating in the Games. The number of competitors qualified by each delegation is indicated in parentheses.

Participating National Paralympic Committees
- Argentina (137)
- Bermuda (1)
- Brazil (231)
- Canada (130)
- Chile (18)
- Colombia (107)
- Costa Rica (29)
- Cuba (48)
- Dominican Republic (9)
- Ecuador (7)
- El Salvador (47)
- Guatemala (28)
- Haiti (4)
- Jamaica (6)
- Mexico (208)
- Nicaragua (5)
- Panama (2)
- Peru (27)
- Puerto Rico (4)
- Suriname (2)
- Trinidad and Tobago (1)
- Uruguay (13)
- United States (189)
- Venezuela (102)

== Sports ==
13 sports, with sub-disciplines, will be contested at the Games. These are:

- Archery (3)
- Athletics (113)
- Boccia (4)
- Cycling
  - Road (13)
  - Track (10)
- Football 5-a-side (1)
- Goalball (2)
- Judo (13)
- Powerlifting (6)
- Sitting volleyball (1)
- Swimming (85)
- Table tennis (21)
- Wheelchair basketball (2)
- Wheelchair tennis (4)

== Venues ==
Most of the new facilities are modest with temporary seating, intended to be utilized in future as training sites and teaching facilities for elite athletes or for community use.

- Telmex Athletics Stadium - Athletics, Opening Ceremony and Closing Ceremony
- Pan American Archery Stadium - Archery
- CODE Dome - Wheelchair Basketball
- Pan American Velodrome - Cycling (track)
- San Rafael Gymnasium - Goalball
- Pan American Hockey Stadium - Football 5-a-side
- CODE II Gymnasium - Table Tennis
- Telcel Tennis Complex - Wheelchair Tennis
- Pan American Volleyball Stadium - Sitting Volleyball
- Weightlifting Forum - Powerlifting
- Multipurpose Gymnasium - Judo
- Scotiabank Aquatics Center - Swimming

== Calendar ==
OC	Opening ceremony	●	Event competitions	1	Event finals	CC	Closing ceremony

November	12 Sat	13 Sun	14 Mon	15 Tue	16 Wed	17 Thu	18 Fri	19 Sat	20 Sun	Events
Ceremonies	OC								CC	
Archery				●	●	3				3
Athletics			21	20	16	24	31		1	113
Boccia		●	●	●	4					4
Cycling		4		4	6			9		23
Football 5-a-side				●	●	●	●	●	1	1
Goalball		●	●	●	●	●	●	2		2
Judo							5	3	3	11
Powerlifting						2	2	2		6
Sitting volleyball			●	●	●	●	1			1
Swimming		11	19	13	13	7	9	13		85
Table tennis		●	●	15	●	●	6			21
Wheelchair basketball		●	●	●	●	●	●	2		2
Wheelchair tennis		●	●	●	●	2	2			4
Total events		15	40	52	39	38	56	31	5	276
Cumulative total		15	55	107	146	184	240	271	276	276
November	12 Sat	13 Sun	14 Mon	15 Tue	16 Wed	17 Thu	18 Fri	19 Sat	20 Sun	Events

== Medal table ==
* Host nation (Mexico)

Rank	Nation	Gold	Silver	Bronze	Total
1	Brazil (BRA)	81	61	58	200
2	United States (USA)	51	47	34	132
3	Mexico (MEX)*	50	60	55	165
4	Cuba (CUB)	27	16	11	54
5	Argentina (ARG)	19	25	31	75
6	Colombia (COL)	18	23	13	54
7	Venezuela (VEN)	16	14	18	48
8	Canada (CAN)	13	22	28	63
9	Jamaica (JAM)	1	4	0	5
10	Chile (CHI)	1	0	3	4
11	Dominican Republic (DOM)	0	1	1	2
12	Trinidad and Tobago (TRI)	0	0	2	2
13	Peru (PER)	0	0	1	1
Totals (13 entries)		277	273	255	805

== See also ==
- 2011 Pan American Games

Preceded by Rio de Janeiro	IV Parapan American Games; Guadalajara (2011)	Succeeded by Toronto
