= Bekele =

Bekele (Amharic: በቀለ, Bek’ele) is an Ethiopian paternal name which may refer to:

== Runners ==
- Abebech Afework Bekele (born 1990), Ethiopian female half marathon runner
- Alemitu Bekele Aga (born 1976), Ethiopian female long-distance runner competing for Belgium
- Alemitu Bekele Degfa (born 1977), 5000 metres runner competing for Turkey
- Alemu Bekele (born 1990), Ethiopian long-distance runner competing for Bahrain
- Azmeraw Bekele (born 1986), Ethiopian marathon runner
- Bekele Debele (born 1963), Ethiopian cross country runner and 1983 world champion
- Bezunesh Bekele (born 1983), Ethiopian female marathon and cross-country runner
- Helen Bekele Tola (born 1994), Ethiopian female long distance runner
- Kenenisa Bekele (born 1982), distance runner who holds world and Olympic records
- Mekdes Bekele (born 1987), 3000 metres steeplechase competitor
- Tariku Bekele (born 1987), Ethiopian long-distance runner and brother of Kenenisa
- Girma Bekele Gebre (born 1992), Ethiopian marathon runner

== Others ==
- Bekele Geleta (born 1944), secretary general of the International Red Cross
- Bekele Gerba (born 1961), Oromo politician promoting political change by non-violence
- Gelila Bekele (born 1984), model and social activist
- Georges Bertrand Bekele, member of the Gabonese Democratic Party
- Heman Bekele, Ethiopian American inventor and scientific researcher
- Mulugeta Bekele (born 1947), Ethiopian physics professor
- Sophia Bekele, business and corporate executive and writer
- Shimelis Bekele, Ethiopian footballer
- Tewodros Bekele (died 1977), Ethiopian trade unionist
