= Clurman =

Clurman is a surname. Notable people with the surname include:

- Harold Clurman (1901–1980), American theatre director and drama critic
- Judith Clurman (fl. 1988), American conductor and educator
- Nathan Clurman (born 1998), American ice hockey player
