= NJDC =

NJDC may refer to:

- National Jewish Democratic Council
- National Junior Disability Championships
- National Juvenile Defender Center
