= Jessica Rogers =

American Paralympic athlete

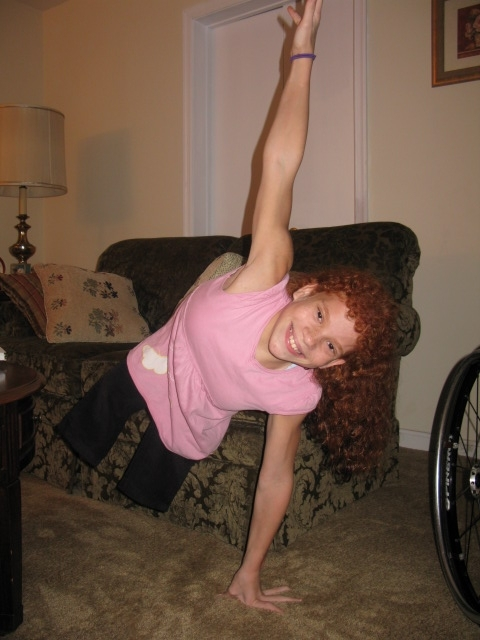
- Rogers in 2010

Personal information
- Nickname: Red
- Born: March 9, 1997 (age 29) Sao Carlos, Brazil
- Education: W. T. Woodson High School (Fairfax, Virginia) '15
- Height: 18 in (46 cm) (2010)
- Weight: 55 lb (25 kg) (2016)

Sport
- Sport: Wheelchair racing Swimming; Wheelchair Basketball
- Disability: Caudal Regression Syndrome
- Disability class: T53
- Event(s): All Events – Track; 100 Breaststroke – Swimming; 200 Breaststroke – Swimming
- University team: University of Illinois at Urbana Champaign
- Team: FISH swim team, McLean, VA (2009–2013)
- Coached by: Andy Cipriano (FISH); Adam Bleakney (UIUC)
Medal record
Paralympic swimming
Representing United States
Parapan American Games
Silver medal – second place	2011 Guadalajara	100m breaststroke SB4
- Updated on 16 July 2016

Jessica Rogers (born March 9, 1997) is an American wheelchair basketballer, wheelchair racer and swimmer. She is also the founder of the International Sacral Agenesis/Caudal Regression Syndrome Association, or iSACRA, an organization for information sharing, support, and networking.

== Early life ==
Rogers was born in Brazil where she spent the first part of her life in an isolated crib in a care facility for adults with severe cognitive limitations. At 14 months old she was adopted into a single parent household with many siblings who have different special needs. Jessica was born with the rare condition of lumbosacral agenesis/caudal regression syndrome and has had bilateral leg amputations due to the condition. Her spine ends at approximately T 7–10, which caused some paralysis. Jessica was born with one kidney and a very small lower anatomy, a common trait associated with caudal regression syndrome.

She graduated from Wilbert Tucker Woodson High School in 2015; she founded The International Sacral Agenesis/Caudal Regression Association, or iSACRA, with a group of volunteers in 2012.

== Awards and achievements ==
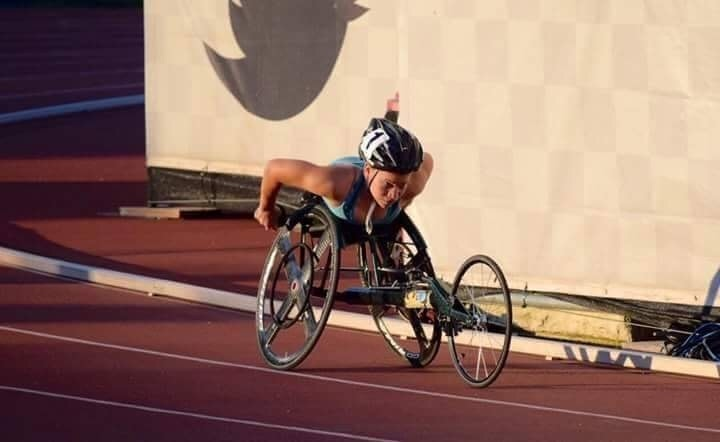
Rogers at Indy International Invitational - Summer 2016

- 2015: Ranked One of the Top Female U.S. Paralympics Track and Field High School All-Americans – 100 M (Ranked 4th, time: 19.08); 200 M (Ranked 6th, time: 34.88); 400 M (Ranked 7th, time 69.06); 800 M (Ranked 5th, time: 02:23.94)
- 2014: U.S. Paralympics, a division of USOC (United States Olympic Committee) Track and field high school all American female
- 2014: 10th International Wheelchair Amputee Sports (IWAS) World Junior Games, Stoke Mandeville, medalist 100, 200, 400, 800 M track events
- 2013: U.S. Paralympics, a division USOC (United States Olympic Committee) Track and field high school all American female, 100 M with a time of 20:34
- 2013: IWAS World Junior Games Mayaguez, Puerto Rico – Special Performance Award (recognition of athletes with international potential competing in their first IWAS World Junior Games)
- 2013: IWAS World Junior Games Mayaguez, Puerto Rico – Swimming S5 category, Gold medal (50m backstroke); Silver medal (200 Individual Medley); Athletics, Two Gold medals (200m; Super Sprint T1, time 1.01.47)
- 2013: International Wheelchair Amputee Sports Junior World Games selectee for US Junior Team, paratriathalon, swimming and track
- 2013: National Wave triathlete, US National Paratriathalon Championships, Austin, Texas
- 2013: National Junior Disability Championships, Rochester, Minnesota, First place 100, 200, 400, 800, 1500 meter wheelchair track, first place 50 m back, breast, fly, free, 100 m breast, 100 m free swimming
- 2013: National Junior Disability Championships, Rochester, Minnesota, Female Track Athlete Spirit of Excellence Award
- 2011: Parapan American Games, Guadalajara, Mexico, silver medal 100 m breaststroke
- 2011: SPORTS 'N SPOKES Magazine's Junior Athlete of the Year
- 2011: Founded iSACRA, an international organization for information and support of individuals with sacral agenesis/caudal regression syndrome
- 2010: Junior National Champion, 100, 200, 400, 800 m wheelchair track
- 2010: Im Able Foundation's Racing Wheelchair Recipient
- 2010: American Paralympic record holder, women's 100 SCY breaststroke
- 2010: American Paralympic record holder, women's 200 SCY IM
- 2010: Canadian American Paralympic National Champion women's 100 m breaststroke
- 2009: Canadian American Paralympic National Champion women's 100 m breaststroke
- 2009: Canadian American Paralympic National Champion women's 200 m breaststroke
- 2008: National Junior Disability Championships, First place 100, 200, 400 m wheelchair track

=== Filmography ===
Documentaries and other television appearances include:

First aired	Title	Episode	Distributor	Produced by
January 18, 2006	REBUILT: The Human Body Shop	A Child's Courage	Discovery Health Channel	D.T. Slouffman
October 2006	News Report: Kicking For Kids Who Can't	N/A	WUSA9 News – Washington D.C. area	Emily Smitt
September 24, 2015	Body Bizarre	Double Amputee Teen Sets Sights On Rio Paralympics	Barcroft Productions	

== See also ==
- Caudal regression syndrome
