= David Chase (musician) =

American music director and arranger

- Born: February 26, 1964 (age 62); Durham, North Carolina, US
- Education: Harvard University, Carter G. Woodson High School
- Occupations: Music director, arranger, composer
- Years active: 1986-present
- Known for: The Marvelous Mrs. Maisel, Schmigadoon!, The Sound of Music Live!, The Boston Pops' '12 Days of Christmas’
- Spouse: Paula Leggett Chase (m.1992)
- Website: davidchasemusic.com

David Chase is a music director and arranger from the United States, working in the fields of film, television, theatre, concerts, and recording. He has served as music director, music supervisor, or dance music arranger for more than 40 Broadway productions, and been nominated for two Emmy Awards, a Laurence Olivier Award, and a Grammy Award. He is based in New York City.

== Early life and education ==
David Chase attended W.T. Woodson High School in Fairfax, Virginia, where he began performing onstage, as well as arranging and orchestrating music.

Chase attended Harvard University, where he majored in biology. While at Harvard, he performed in the Harvard Hasty Pudding Show (for which he also wrote music and lyrics), and sang with the Harvard University Choir under conductor John Ferris. Following his graduation in 1986, Chase remained in Boston, working as music director and arranger for the revue Forbidden Broadway.

== Career ==
In 1990, Chase moved to New York City, where he worked as a rehearsal pianist at Radio City Music Hall, and eventually for Broadway productions including Guys and Dolls and Crazy for You. While working on Crazy for You at the Shubert Theatre, he married cast member Paula Leggett.

In 1993, arranger and music director James Raitt hired Chase as associate music director for a revival of Damn Yankees at the Old Globe Theatre in San Diego. When Raitt's illness from AIDS progressed, Chase assumed music direction for the Broadway transfer in 1994, in his first conducting role on Broadway.

Since then, Chase has served as music director, music supervisor, and/or dance music arranger for more than 40 Broadway productions, including Damn Yankees (1994 revival), Side Show, Little Me (1998 revival), Kiss Me Kate (both 1999 and 2019 revivals), The Music Man (2000 and 2022 revivals), Thoroughly Modern Millie, Flower Drum Song (2002 revival), The Pajama Game (2006 revival), Billy Elliot the Musical, How to Succeed in Business Without Really Trying (2011 revival), Rodgers + Hammerstein's Cinderella, and Nice Work If You Can Get It, for which he received a Grammy nomination as a producer of the cast album.

He has also worked on Sarah Silverman's The Bedwetter (Atlantic Theatre Company and Arena Stage), Disney's On the Record (National Tour), The Unsinkable Molly Brown (The Transport Group), I Can Get It for You Wholesale (Classic Stage), and Schmigadoon! (The Kennedy Center). He has worked on West End productions including Disney's Hercules, the 25th anniversary production of Disney's Beauty and the Beast, and revivals of Dreamgirls, Guys and Dolls, and Evita. He was nominated for a 2022 Laurence Olivier Award for his arrangements for Anything Goes.

In 1998, Chase began working as music director for the Boston Pops, first for Sarah Jessica Parker's appearance on WGBH's Evening at Pops. He has subsequently written many arrangements for the Boston Pops and the Tanglewood Festival Chorus, including their signature version of The 12 Days of Christmas.

Chase was arranger and music director for several Kennedy Center Honors tribute segments, including one for Barbara Cook in 2010. Chase served as arranger and music director, for the live musicals The Sound of Music Live! (2013) and Peter Pan Live! (2014), and received Emmy Award nominations for music direction for both.

In 2014, Chase began working with the Lyric Opera of Chicago, as music director for productions of Carousel, The King and I, and The Sound of Music, and as host and conductor of 100 Years of Bernstein, and in 2021, the pandemic 'video cabaret' The New Classics.

In 2015, he started writing choral music for Judith Clurman and Essential Voices USA, such as the song cycles Washington Women and Appalachian Stories. His choral arrangements, including The First Noel, God Rest Ye, The Cradle Hymn, and Eight Days of Lights, have been performed at Carnegie Hall and by choirs and orchestras internationally. His choral works are published by Hal Leonard.

In 2021–2023, Chase was music director and arranger (with Doug Besterman) of Schmigadoon!, which ran for two seasons on Apple TV+. The song "Corn Puddin'", arranged by Chase, won the Emmy award for Best Song in 2022.

Chase was arranger and orchestrator for three seasons of The Marvelous Mrs. Maisel (including the 2023 Best Song Emmy nominee "Your Personal Trash Man Can"), and two seasons of Crazy Ex-Girlfriend (including the 2019 Best Song Emmy winner "Anti-Depressants Are So Not a Big Deal"). He has also worked on Étoile, Love and Death, and American Classic, and has arranged and orchestrated individual songs for The Gilded Age, Goliath, and Halston, among others.

Chase appeared onscreen in season 5 of The Marvelous Mrs. Maisel as the announcer and bandleader for 'The Gordon Ford Show'. He has conducted film scores for The Last Showgirl, The Kitchen, and A Quiet Place Part II. His arrangements and orchestrations appear in Joker: Folie à Deux ("To Love Somebody"), and Beyond the Sea.

== Personal life ==
Chase lives in New York City with his wife, actress Paula Leggett Chase, and their two sons, Kyler and Dashiell.
