= Geleta =

Geleta is a surname. Notable people with the surname include:

- Bekele Geleta (fl. 1984), Ethiopian non-profit executive
- Ján Geleta (born 1943), Slovak football player
