= Lance Horne =

American composer, lyricist, pianist and music director

- Origin: Wyoming, U.S.
- Education: Interlochen Center for the Arts; Juilliard School (BM, MM)
- Occupations: Composer; lyricist; pianist; singer; music director; arranger; producer
- Instruments: Piano, vocals
- Years active: 1990s–present
- Awards: Daytime Emmy Award (2008); Jonathan Larson Grant (2006); Bistro Award (2010)
- Website: lancehorne.com

Lance Horne is an American composer, lyricist, pianist, singer, music director, arranger and producer. He is a Steinway Artist and a winner of a Daytime Emmy Award for Outstanding Original Song. He provided vocal arrangements for the 2005 Broadway musical Little Women, has served as music director for Alan Cumming and Liza Minnelli, has arranged for and performed with Carol Channing and Kylie Minogue, and since the mid-2010s has hosted the weekly piano-bar-style cabaret Mondays in the Club with Lance at Club Cumming in New York City's East Village.

== Early life and education ==
Horne is a native of Wyoming. He attended Interlochen Arts Camp in 1994–95 and Interlochen Arts Academy from 1994 to 1996, and went on to earn Bachelor of Music and Master of Music degrees in composition at the Juilliard School.

Horne has said he was born deaf in his right ear and was told as a young person that he would not succeed in music.

== Career ==
=== Television and film ===
In 2008, Horne won a Daytime Emmy Award for Outstanding Original Song for "Chemistry," written for the ABC soap opera One Life to Live with lyricist Paul S. Glass; the category ended in a tie with "Little Starr," also from the series. The winners were announced at the 35th Daytime Emmy Creative Arts ceremony on June 13, 2008. The song was written for the One Life to Live special Prom Night: The Musical.

His other television and film work includes the theme for The Ricki Lake Show (Fox), music for the Macy's Thanksgiving Day Parade broadcasts (NBC), and music supervision, arrangements and score for the HBO documentary Each and Every Day, directed by Alexandra Shiva.

=== Broadway and theatre ===
Horne wrote the vocal arrangements for the Broadway production of Little Women, which opened on January 23, 2005. He later contributed arrangements to, and appeared in, Regina Spektor on Broadway.

He received a Jonathan Larson Grant (composer-lyricist) from the American Theatre Wing in 2006, and has served as music director for the National Theatre (London) production of Alice by Heart. At the American Repertory Theater he has worked as music director and on special orchestrations and arrangements, including on ExtraOrdinary, Cabaret and Prometheus Bound.

With lyricist Mark Campbell he wrote Three Lost Chords, a set of three solo operatic works inspired by Poe, Kafka and the band Sparks, presented at the Zipper Factory in New York in January 2008, and he contributed to the Off-Broadway song cycle Songs from an Unmade Bed.

In 2026 the Public Theater presented the world-premiere concert of LUX, a musical with book, music and lyrics by Horne that moves between pre-revolutionary Paris and 1929 New Orleans.

=== Collaborations and concert work ===
Horne is closely associated with actor and singer Alan Cumming, serving as music director and pianist for Cumming's cabaret tours, including Alan Cumming Sings Sappy Songs (which toured internationally and was filmed for PBS) and its run at the 2016 Edinburgh International Festival. He produced Cumming's album I Bought a Blue Car Today, which earned a Bistro Award. The Huffington Post described him as music director for both Minnelli and Cumming in 2013,.

He has also arranged for or performed with Carol Channing, Kylie Minogue, Kristin Chenoweth, Jake Shears, Rufus Wainwright, Pink Martini and others. He accompanied Chenoweth at a performance at the U.S. Embassy in London attended by Barack Obama, Michelle Obama and Queen Elizabeth II.

In London, the West End showcase Notes Unleashed: The Music of Lance Horne was staged at the Vaudeville Theatre as part of the Notes from New York series, with Cumming leading a cast of performers. He released the album First Things Last in 2011, marked by concerts in New York and at London's Garrick Theatre in January 2011 with guests including Alan Cumming, Hannah Waddingham and Julie Atherton. His choral song cycle Tyler's Suite, dedicated to Tyler Clementi and including contributions from other composers such as Stephen Schwartz, premiered in San Francisco in March.

In 2020 he created Secret Broadway for HOTA (Home of the Arts) on Australia's Gold Coast, inspired by Jack Viertel's book The Secret Life of the American Musical, and presented an Australian edition of his Monday cabaret.

=== Mondays in the Club with Lance ===
Horne hosts Mondays in the Club with Lance, a weekly event at Club Cumming, Alan Cumming's East Village bar, in which Broadway performers, amateur singers and audience members sing show tunes around a piano. The Public Theater has also presented a spin-off, Mondays in the Pub, and Horne has held multiple residencies at Joe's Pub. In November 2021 an edition benefited God's Love We Deliver and honored Andrew Scott, Julia Louis-Dreyfus and Misty Copeland. On April 6, 2026, HowlRound and partners marked his 400th performance of the series, describing it as one of the longest socially engaged durational performances in New York City. In February 2024 Horne took part in a New York Times round-table interview on the state of New York cabaret, headlined “Reports of Cabaret’s Death Have Been Greatly Exaggerated.”

=== COVID-19 pandemic ===
When live performance in New York shut down in March 2020, Horne moved his Monday-night piano party from the East Village to a web stream on Crowdcast; Time featured him in a video interview alongside comedian Remy Kassimir and belly-dance teacher Salit Cohen-Cheng. That autumn, Time Out New York reported that Horne had begun making soy-wax candles while sheltering upstate, and that the project grew into a company, We Light, whose handmade candles were produced in Horne's apartment by out-of-work performers who each received a share of the sale price.

=== Esotericam Productions ===
Lance Horne is the music director at Esotericam Productions, the production company established by actors America Olivo and Christian Campbell. Horne curated and hosted the company's Live from Gramercy Park video series, shot at The Players in New York City in 2014 and published by Broadway Licensing.

=== Teaching ===
Horne taught for about a decade at Juilliard and its Pre-College division, and has taught at NYU and EAMA Paris; he has been a guest artist at Stockholm's HyperIsland and at Interlochen Arts Academy. He is on the faculty of Syracuse University.

== Critical reception ==
Reviewing Horne's First Things Last project in 2011, The New York Times wrote of “forthright folk-pop tunes with meat on their bones.” A review of the London release concert praised the songs' relatable lyrics and precise construction.

Of Three Lost Chords (2008), The New York Times observed: “There amid the madness, dark humor lies in wait.”

His unaccompanied choral piece “all together,” recorded by the New York Concert Singers under Judith Clurman on the New World Records release A Season's Promise, was called “ravishing” by Classics Today.

Rolling Stone singled out “Greasy, brashly defiant anthems like Sad Song Backwards” in its review of Jake Shears's 2018 self-titled debut; “Sad Song Backwards” is a song Horne co-wrote with Shears.

== Awards and honors ==
- 2006 – Jonathan Larson Grant, composer-lyricist, American Theatre Wing
- 2008 – Daytime Emmy Award for Outstanding Original Song ("Chemistry," One Life to Live; tie)
- 2010 – Bistro Award for Best Album (Alan Cumming, I Bought a Blue Car Today)
- Multiple ASCAP Young Composer and Member awards
- Nominee, Helpmann Award
- Steinway Artist since 2013

== Selected works ==
=== Stage ===
- Little Women (Broadway, 2005) – vocal arrangements
- Songs from an Unmade Bed – contributing composer
- Three Lost Chords (with Mark Campbell) – composer
- Alice by Heart (National Theatre, London) – music director
- ExtraOrdinary, Cabaret, Prometheus Bound (American Repertory Theater) – music director / arrangements
- LUX – book, music and lyrics (concert premiere, Public Theater, 2026)

=== Recordings ===
- First Things Last (2011)
- A Season's Promise (New World Records) – composer of “all together”
- Alan Cumming Sings Sappy Songs – music director, pianist
- I Bought a Blue Car Today (Alan Cumming) – producer
- Little Women original cast recording (Ghostlight) – vocal arrangements
- Jake Shears (Jake Shears) – featuring the Preservation Hall Jazz Band

== Personal life ==
Horne lives in New York City and has described himself as a gay man. He supports organizations including amfAR, Broadway Cares/Equity Fights AIDS, the Actors Fund, GLAAD, Sing for Hope and the Point Foundation through benefit appearances and original material.
