= DotConnectAfrica =

Non-profit organization

DotConnectAfrica Trust
- Founded: 2006
- Founder: Sophia Bekele
- Purpose: The advancement of education in information technology and access to internet resources;
- Location(s): Nairobi, Kenya; Port Louis, Mauritius
- Origins: Africa
- Region served: Global
- Services: Miss.Africa, DCA Digital Academy, DCA Corporate Boot Camp
- Members: 35
- Key people: Sophia Bekele, Founder & CEO; Shanil Ramtohul, CFO; Kim Gueho, Director, Trust Fund; Dev. R Erriah, Corporate Council
- Website: DotConnectAfrica Trust

DotConnectAfrica Trust (DCA) is an independent non-profit, non-partisan organization founded in 2006. The organization was incorporated in Mauritius with its main charitable objectives to: (a) for the advancement of education in information technology to the African society and access to internet resources; and (b) in connection with (a) to provide the African society with a continental Internet domain name by sponsoring, establishing, and operating a new Top Level Domain (TLD) ".africa" for purposes of branding Africa on the Internet.

As of 2023, the DCA Trust runs the Miss.africa digital rebranded as Fempower and DCA Corporate tech boot camp programs under the DCA Digital Academy umbrella. These programs under DCA Digital Academy have won various accolades, including the 2022 CEO Today Awards.

== Governance Structure ==
According to the organization website, the governance model is to be adapted from Africa's development policy model augmented with other geo-TLD models. Public Policy consideration will include direct input from African policy makers, including the African Union, Economic Commission for Africa and African Development Bank on policy matters.

== Initiation of .africa ==
Sophia Bekele, director of DotConnectAfrica, has undertaken internet and ICT policy-level work with various UN Agencies prior to being appointed to ICANN to serve as a member of the gNSO Council (from 2005 to 2007). The gNSO counsel oversights the new gTLD [generic Top-Level Domains] policy development process (PDP) for ICANN. In 2006, Bekele initiated the .africa TLD proposal at ICANN and announced her organization's intention to make a bid for the .africa TLD during the Paris ICANN International meeting, addressing the stakeholders.

== Endorsement to DCA ==
DCA is the first to present and get endorsement of the DotAfrica (.africa) gTLD initiative to several inter-governmental bodies in Africa, such as the United Nations Economic Commission for Africa (UNECA), and the African Union Commission (AUC) under African Union. The UNECA is the regional economic development body of the United Nations in Africa. It helps the AU meet its strategic objectives in the areas of knowledge management and sharing, technical implementation capacity, studies, and research, the results of which are disseminated to different African countries to help them in policy formulation, implementation of economic development goals and objectives, and capacity building.

DCA then received an endorsement for its DotAfrica (.africa) initiative from the UNECA economic grouping, which has all the African countries as its member states. DCA also presented and clarified the DotAfrica (.africa) initiative to the African Union Commission and, after working closely with AU officials, received an early endorsement in support of its gTLD proposal in 2009.

DCA also received another endorsement from key organizations of the global public internet such as Internationalized Domain Resolution Union (IDRU) which deals with global multi-language initiatives and whose members also contributed to the ICANN IDN policy process.

== Yes2dotAfrica Global Campaign ==
After the approvals by the Pan African institutions, DotConnectAfrica then launched and run a 6-year successful "Yes2dotAfrica" global awareness campaign as an ongoing effort to create awareness of the benefits of a dotAfrica name and do a public outreach. This campaign initiative, also part of DCA's Trust program is meant to give Africa a regional identity and global presence. The Campaign was first launched in East Africa during the 2010 AITEC East Africa ICT Summit held from 7–8 September 2010 in Nairobi, Kenya. Sophia Bekele, the executive director, DotConnectAfrica made the announcement during the summit in her Keynote speech Since, the Yes2dotafrica campaign has gained recognition and been given credence as a platform for advocacy of the benefits of DotAfrica gTLD and technology transfer and received a very high number of global media coverage

In December 2011, DCA reported that over 3600 potential registrants had preregistered with DCA as part of its promotional campaign jointly with United Domain. DCA also said in its application to ICANN that, if granted the right to administer the .africa TLD, DCA would set prices at levels competitive with the popular .com TLD:about $10 for the domains

Other trust programs identified by DCA include Miss.africa, Generation.africa and driving the capacity of the African ccTLDs.

== Registry Services Strategic and Industry Partnerships ==
DotConnectAfrica had set up an affiliate DCA Registry Services Ltd. in Nairobi, Kenya, for the running of the registry operation. The DCA registry intended to channel surplus resources gained from the .Africa registry operation to sponsor foundations that will cater to various charitable projects, including the already launched miss.africa digital and generation.africa, as well as capacity building for African ccTLDs, with the general objective of improving the African Internet and business landscape. DotConnectAfrica announced in June 2012 that it had made an agreement with CentralNic, a domain name registrar in the United Kingdom, to provide registry services for the .africa TLD. DCA also reached agreements with Safaricom and Fincom to provide co-location for the hardware necessary to run the .africa registry.

== (AUC) interest in .Africa and its participation in the ICANN process ==
DCA Trust was the first organization to approach the AUC and get an early endorsement to establish a .africa registry in Africa. However, after the AUC's chairman's office gave an endorsement in lieu of a support letter obtained from the AUC Infrastructure and Energy, that same AUC a few months later turned around and expressed a new interest to get the gTLD for its own benefit. Then, the AUC issued a statement on May 12, 2010, referencing the endorsement letter issued to DCA, and stated that they would work with ICANN and other internet stakeholders to go through an open process to determine the implementation of .africa.

=== AUC DotAfrica Taskforce ===
Nearly a year later, the AUC organized an "AU DotAfrica Task Force" (members drawn from the African Internet Community, but that did not include DCA members), and issued yet another letter after the prior one to DCA, stating that the AU did not support nor endorse any individual or organization and announced that entities interested must submit their Expression of Interest (EOI), which would serve as the commission's basis for endorsement and selection. DCA criticized AUC's plan to issue an EOI for an endorsement process, stating AUC's objective for accountability and transparency was "hollow and unbelievable," as their EOI fails to acknowledge the previous endorsement issued to DCA by the AUC. Furthermore, DCA pointed out that the EOI process would be biased, as the AU Task Force had already expressed its support for AfTLD during the 2011 annual African ccTLD event in Ghana. Additionally the AU Task force members are the same individuals who have vested interest in the outcome of the .africa as the members are compiled of the individuals that have registered a "dotafrica.org" domain and have claimed to be the competition for DCA's initiative.

=== DCA Trust Victory against the AUC's attempt to reserve the name .africa for itself ===
During the ICANN 46 International meeting in October 2011 in Dakar Senegal, DCA opposed the reservation of the names .africa, .afrique and .afriqya, suggestions that had been forwarded by the AUC and the AU DotAfrica Task Force, after the ministerial round table that preceded the Senegal ICANN meeting DCA strongly objected to this proposal by voicing its opinion during the ICANN Dakar public forum meeting directly to the ICANN Board as well as in writing to ICANN. DCA stated the addition of these names to ICANN's reserved list would have jeopardized the .Africa applications in the current new gTLD opening from being applied to by any applicant as per ICANN's gTLD guidebook The reservation of these names to the AUC would have meant that all the applications of the .africa gTLD would have been annulled and there would not be any competition to the .Africa gTLD at the ICANN level, as the names will be reserved for the AUC under a legislative protection for their own use as the AUC is requesting. After a period of time, DCA's requested for a public written response from ICANN on this issue and ICANN responded on March 8, 2012, to the Communiqué presented by the AU officials during the Pre-Senegal Ministerial roundtable and eventually the names were not reserved, making DCA victorious on this issue

Failing to get the name directly reserved by ICANN in response to the Dakar request, in January 2013, the African Union Commission directly appointed a South African company UniForum to administer the .africa TLD on behalf of Africa. This was contested by DCA as quite misleading giving the reason that a firm cannot be selected to administer a domain that has not yet been delegated. Then the African Union Commission issued a Request for Proposal (RFP) and endorsed the same South African company as a preferred applicant for .africa, stating that it went through an international competitive bid in an open and transparent process. DotConnectAfrica stated the AU RFP to select a Registry was issued shortly after Dakar meeting in December and an award was made in January, an incredibly short period of evaluation time compared to what even ICANN registry selection process for an applicant would take nearly 6 –8 months. Additionally, the AU RFP imposed a "community application restrictions" which is not in line with the ICANN RFP for a gTLD applicant, making it impossible for any serious applicant to legitimately participate in the process, except Uniform that was directly recommended by the Chairman of the AFTLD (African Top Level Domain Name organization) who also runs the South African .ZA authority, as well as whose organization is represented at the AU DotAfrica TaskForce. Therefore, DCA contested that the entire RFP should be null and void as it is illegitimate and the members full of conflict of interest. Thereafter, DCA challenged the AU to fully disclose several issues in the greater interest of global public transparency and accountability" and release the details of its (dot)Africa EOI process and the RFP. DCA also submitted this issues to ICANN Governmental Advisory Committee

== Application to ICANN ==
The DotAfrica .africa gTLD application was submitted by DCA Trust during the application window that opened on 12 January 2012 and closed on 22 May 2012. DCA hopes to win the mandate from ICANN for the management of the .africa gTLD to enable it administer this resource on behalf of its Pan-African constituency and other stakeholders around the globe.

DCA Trust has made explicit commitment in its .africa application to ICANN that the Trust will establish a full-service Internet registry which will be operated by DCA Registry Services Ltd. in accordance with the technical and operational criteria and other specifications stipulated by ICANN in the new gTLD Applicants' Guidebook.

In its response to comments for competitive applicants, DCA wrote its official response to the Evaluators of ICANN that the application for Uniforum should be disqualified as it does not meet the legal, financial and endorsement criteria that followed the ICANN guidebook. Amongst many of its comments, most significantly DCA criticized that Uniforum's application submitted as co-applicant with AU has given the rights of the database and Intellectual property to the AU in a separate contract as such policy is against ICANNs new gTLD requirements, despite the AUC not even being alegal applicant, just to get public support from African governments. Additionally DCA noted that uniforum provided an Understated Registry COI Amount and therefore UniForum does not pass the Financial Evaluation Criteria for the COI, if the actual COI amount provided by UniForum has been deliberately understated and that the amount is grossly insufficient to cater for the necessary user and registrant protection from possible risks of .AFRICA registry failure (or business failure of UniForum ZA Central Registry).

== DotConnectAfrica's complaint letter to the US congress ==
In February 2013, not getting response to the communication sent to ICANN and the African Union DCA appealed to members of the U.S. Congress in February, 2013. DCA wrote and reiterated their issues with the manner in which UniForum received and carried out the AU's endorsement. DCA notes that it does not feel there are sufficient mechanisms for appeal or dealing with illegalities over the new gTLD program and requested the U.S. Congress to intervene immediately to appoint an independent New gTLD Ombudsman for the entire ICANN New gTLD program, where such grievances will be heard and addressed

== Early warnings of objections to DCA's application ==
On November 20, 2012, the AUC failing to get the .africa string names reserved, they followed the advice given by the ICANN Board in their reply to the AU communiqué, that states "While ICANN is not able to offer the specific relief requested in the Communiqué, the robust protections built into the New gTLD Program afford the African Union (and its individual member states), through the Government Advisory Committee, the opportunity to raise concerns that an applicant is seen as potentially sensitive or problematic, or provide direct advice to the Board. In addition, the African Union (and its individual member states) can avail itself of any of the appropriate objection processes mentioned above in the event an application is received for any string – even those beyond representations of .Africa – that may raise concern" and so filed an "early warning" objecting to DCA's application for the dotAfrica TLD with ICANN's Governmental Advisory Committee (GAC). Therefore, the objection by the AUC stated that "the application fails to meet the minimum requirements prescribed by ICANN in the gTLD Applicant Guidebook concerning geographic names" and that

DCA's application constitutes an unwarranted intrusion and interference with the mandate given to the AUC by African Head of States and African Ministers responsible for Communication and Information Technologies. In this regard the AUC has been mandated to establish dotAfrica (.Africa) as a continental Top-Level Domain for use by organisations, businesses and individuals with guidance from African Internet Agencies and in doing so to set up the structures and modalities for the implementation of the dotAfrica (.Africa) project. DCA's persistent interference in this process is likely to have substantive political, economic and social repercussions in Africa.

Identical early warnings of objection were filed with the GAC by the governments of Comoros, Kenya, Cameroon, Democratic Republic of the Congo, Benin, Egypt, Burkina Faso, Ghana, Morocco, Uganda, Senegal, South Africa, Nigeria, and Tanzania.

== GAC Objection to DCA's application ==
Beijing GAC objection: The ICANN meeting in Beijing China set the ground for some of the new gTLD procedures to continue, GAC Advice was part of the communiqué that saw several strings receive varying responses to their applications. The results of the GAC advice though attracted wide criticism from the internet fraternity as to how some of the decisions were reached. DotConnectAfrica application received a GAC Objection advice to which they submitted a response following guidelines of the guidebook The New gTLD Program Committee, which is part of the ICANN Board subsequently gave recommendation that the GAC advice be followed, which essential is the Board's advise, DCA critiqued in their reply to GAC. DCA then refused to withdraw, its application before accountability hearing is completed, against the backdrop that the ICANN Board decision was "unfair, discriminatory, and lacked appropriate due diligence and care" as well as "anti-competitive" to their application and organizational aspirations.

== IRP Process: DCA Vs ICANN ==
After the objection, DotConnectAfrica refused to back down and contacted the African Union and ICANN. DCA also requested for a Reconsideration which ICANN denied prompting that organization to begin the Independent Review Process. The IRP is a proceeding provided for in Article IV, Section 3 of the ICANN Bylaws, by which any person materially affected by a decision or action of the ICANN Board may request that the action be reviewed by an independent third party for consistency with the ICANN Bylaws and/or Articles of Incorporation and is governed by the International Dispute Resolution Procedures of the ICDR and the Supplementary Procedures for ICANN IRP Process.

On March 26, 2014 at the ICANN Singapore meeting ICANN signed a controversial contract with ZACR, despite IRP proceedings with DCA, which received criticisms against such actions by some African public media.

=== IRP Injunction awarded to DotConnectAfrica Trust ===
On May 12, 2014 DCA won an injunction against ICANN in its IRP Proceedings in an arbitration process. The Injunction ruled that "ICANN must immediately refrain from any further processing of any application for .africa until this Panel has heard the merits of DCA's Trust Notice of Independent Review Process and issued its final decision regarding the same". ICANN had on March 24, 2014 proceeded to sign a contract with ZACR who are competitors for the ".africa" string, sparking an outrage that ICANN was continually mistreating DCA Trust. DCA is represented by an international law firm Weil, Gotshal & Manges LLP based in New York while ICANN is represented by a Los Angeles-based Law Firm Jones Day LLC, which has been working with ICANN nearly since its inception

=== Panel accepts DCA's position on procedural framework on DotAfrica IRP ===
On 14 August 2014, The IRP panel issued a Thirty Three (33) Pages ruling to accept DotConnectAfrica's position on the procedural framework of the IRP proceedings. The Panel has ruled terming its Declaration and the future Declaration on the Merits of the case are binding on ICANN. (ICANN wanted this to be "advisory" and not "binding)

=== DCA Trust Victory against ICANN ===
On 9th July 2015, DCA Trust won in the DCA Vs ICANN .Africa IRP. DCA Trust was declared the prevailing party. The ICANN Board on 16 July 2015 called a special meeting consider the independent review panel's declaration that held in favor of DotConnectAfrica Trust, the board resolved that DCA's application would be taken back to evaluation. Part of the IRP panel's recommendations are as follows:

148 Based on the foregoing, after having carefully reviewed the Parties’ written submissions, listened to the testimony of the three witness, listened to the oral submissions of the Parties in various telephone conference calls and at the in-person hearing of this IRP in Washington, D.C., on 22 and 23 May 2015, and finally after much deliberation, pursuant to Article IV, Section 3, paragraph 11 (c) of ICANN's Bylaws, the Panel declares that both the actions and inactions of the Board with respect to the application of DCA Trust relating to the .AFRICA gTLD were inconsistent with the Articles of Incorporation and Bylaws of ICANN.

149 Furthermore, pursuant to Article IV, Section 3, paragraph 11 (d) of ICANN's Bylaws, the Panel recommends that ICANN continue to refrain from delegating the .AFRICA gTLD and permit DCA Trust's application to proceed through the remainder of the new gTLD application process.

150 The Panel declares DCA Trust to be the prevailing party in this IRP and further declares that ICANN is to bear, pursuant to Article IV, Section 3, paragraph 18 of the Bylaws, Article 11 of Supplementary Procedures and Article 31 of the ICDR Rules, the totality of the costs of this IRP and the totality of the costs of the IRP Provider

The documents of this IRP can be found on DCA's website

== DotConnectAfrica Trust Vs ICANN Court Case ==
=== Court Grants DotConnectAfrica's Ex Parte Application Temporary Restraining Order ===
DotConnectAfrica Trust took ICANN to Court on January 20, 2016 following a disagreement on how ICANN processed the IRP ruling that was declared DCA Trust the prevailing party on July 9, 2015. DCA Trust submitted its first Amended Notice on 26 February 2016.

A United States District Court, Central District Of California - Western Division on March 4, 2016 in a ruling granted an Interim Relief for DotConnectAfrica in a decision [PDF Case No: CV 16-00862 RGK (JCx)] that ICANN should hold off from delegating the .AFRICA top-level domain (TLD) for ZA Central Registry (ZACR.

The Court ruling stated:

(IN CHAMBERS) Plaintiff's Ex Parte Application for TRO (DE [20]) by Judge R. Gary Klausner: The Court grants Plaintiff's Ex Parte Application for TRO. Defendant is enjoined from issuing the .Africa gTLD until the Court decides Plaintiff's Motion for Preliminary Injunction, scheduled for hearing on April 4, 2016.

Upon review of the parties' arguments, the Court finds serious questions going to the merits. Plaintiff has demonstrated that once the gTLD is issued, it will be unable to obtain those rights elsewhere. Moreover, the injury it will suffer cannot be compensated through monetary damages. In opposition, Defendant states in conclusory fashion only that the African governments and the ICANN community will suffer prejudice if the delegation of the gTLD is delayed.

The Temporary Restraining Order will allow the Court time to consider arguments from DotConnectAfrica Trust (DCA Trust) and ICANN regarding the .AFRICA TLD. DCA Trust is represented by Brown, Neri, Smith & Khan LLP in the case

=== Court Grants DotConnectAfrica's Application for Preliminary Injunction, April 12, 2016 ===
On April 12, 2016, the same court also granted a Preliminary Injunction for DotConnectAfrica, the decision for case no. 16-CV-00862 RGK (JCx) [PDF] The ruling detailed among other things that The balance of equities tips in favor of granting the preliminary injunction. Without preliminary injunction, DCA will lose the opportunity to obtain rights to .Africa because ICANN will likely delegate the rights to ZACR prior to the conclusion of this action, and these rights can be delegated only once.

The ruling also shed light on the AUC relationship with ICANN stating that public interest favors granting preliminary injunction, that The AUC's relationship with ZACR, and its interest in preventing the delay of issuing rights to .Africa creates a conflict of interest. Therefore, on this point, the Court accords little weight to the Yedaly Declaration. On balance, the Court finds it more prejudicial to the African community, and the international community in general, if the delegation of .Africa is made prior to a determination on the fairness of the process by which it was delegated.

=== Courts rule in favor of ICANN on .Africa to stop DCA's case from being heard on its merit at a jury trial ===
Ten years later after the legal dispute started, the journey of .africa has gone through literally three courts in California, and a number of Judges had ruled in favor and also contrary to the case. Therefore, despite the multiple precedential wins on DCA's battle over the .Africa Domain, unfortunately, the final outcome did not favor DCA Trust. DCA lost the US court battle for .Africa in 2021 when the Appeals court affirmed Lower court's decision that stopped DCA's case from moving forward to a Jury trail without the merits being heard.
