= Move United =

US non-profit parasports organization

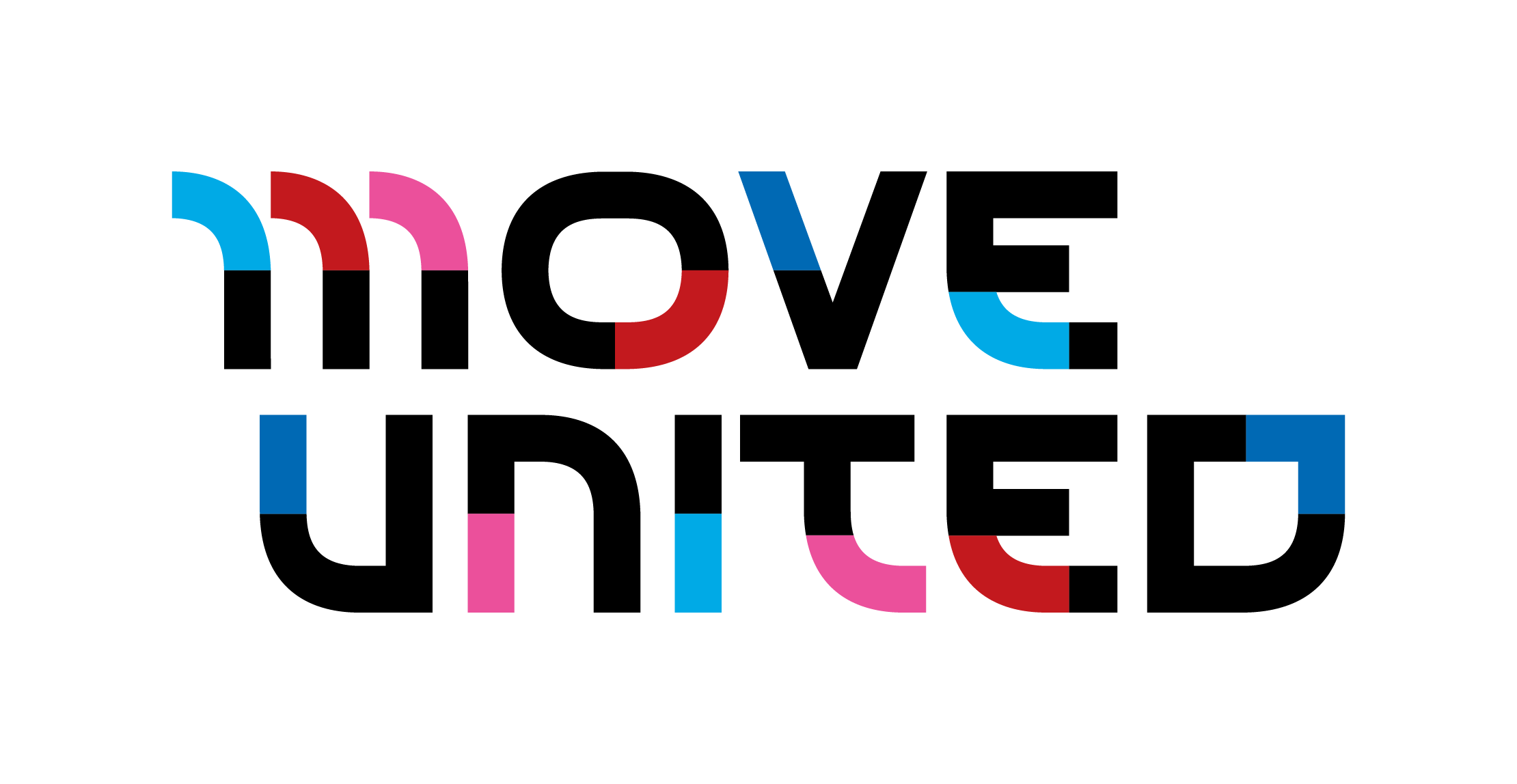
- Formation: 2020 as merger of Disabled Sports USA (1956) and Adaptive Sports USA (1967).
- Tax ID no.: 94-6174016
- Legal status: 501(c)(3) nonprofit organization
- Purpose: "to provide national leadership and opportunities for individuals with disabilities to develop independence, confidence, and fitness through participation in community sports, competition, recreation, high performance sport and educational programs."
- Headquarters: Rockville, Maryland
- Coordinates: 39.0895234°N 77.1511348°W
- Region served: United States
- Executive Director: Glenn Merry
- President: John Blossom
- Affiliations: Member of United States Olympic & Paralympic Committee
- Revenue: $3,540,855 (2014)
- Expenses: $3,248,182 (2014)
- Employees: 16 (2013)
- Volunteers: 745 (2014)
- Website: www.moveunitedsport.org

Move United is an American non-profit organization devoted to the promotion of parasports among youths and adults with physical disabilities. The organization operates community parasports programs via over 150 local chapters across the United States. Move United was formed in 2020 as a merger of two organizations: Disabled Sports USA, which was first founded in 1956 and based in Rockville, Maryland, and Adaptive Sports USA, an organization founded in 1967. Move United is a member of the United States Olympic & Paralympic Committee. As of 2020, the organization operates programs serving 100,000 residents in 43 states. In 2020, the two organizations merged as Move United, introducing a new identity by Superunion. A goal was announced for the organization to serve 90% of the U.S. population with local programs by 2028, in time for the 2028 Summer Paralympics in Los Angeles.

== Adaptive Sports USA ==
Adaptive Sports USA (formerly the National Wheelchair Athletic Association, Wheelchair Sports USA, and Wheelchair & Ambulatory Sports, USA) was established in 1956, as the National Wheelchair Athletic Association, by disabled military veterans to help rehabilitate the war injured returning from Korea.

Mostly a volunteer organization, Adaptive Sports USA worked in conjunction with local and regional sports organizations to develop and promote sanctioned sporting events for youths and adults with a physical disability. The mission of Adaptive Sports USA was to engage, evolve, and empower individuals with a disability to be involved in adaptive sport through education, coaching, and advocacy. By creating a community outreach program, Adaptive Sports USA increased opportunities for individuals with a disability and offered a gateway to regional, national and international multi-sport competitions.

Each year, Adaptive Sports USA sponsored the Adaptive Sports USA Junior Nationals (formerly the National Junior Disability Championships [NJDC]), the longest continually run competition for athletes with a physical disability in the United States.

=== History ===
Adaptive Sports USA has a long and storied history in providing competitive sports opportunities to individuals with a disability. Founded in 1956 as the National Wheelchair Athletic Association, the early years of wheelchair sports were successful in large part due to the efforts of Benjamin Lipton, the Bulova Watch Company, and the Bulova School of Watchmaking. Mr. Lipton was the executive director of the Bulova School of Watchmaking and served as the Chairman of NWAA for the first 25 years of its existence. Mr. Lipton ensured the viability of the organization during the early years by making the Bulova Company a primary financial supporter of NWAA.

The initial impetus to organize NWAA grew out of the interests of athletes with disabilities, many of whom were veterans of World War II. They wanted to participate in sports other than basketball, a sport that had seen rapid growth in the early 1950s through teams sponsored by veterans hospitals and other rehabilitation agencies. General Omar N. Bradley was one of the leaders of the early efforts to develop wheelchair sports programs, principally for servicemen injured during the war. In the early days, many wheelchair basketball players saw participation in individual wheelchair sports as supplementary training for their primary interest in basketball. However, the NWAA program appealed to even greater numbers of athletes with disabilities due to the incorporation of women and athletes with quadriplegia, populations that could not be easily accommodated by basketball. Europe's first organized wheelchair sports program was introduced in 1948 by well-known neurosurgeon, Dr. Ludwig Guttman, founder of the Spinal Injury Center in Stoke Mandeville, England. The first Stoke Mandeville Games included only twenty-six participants, and few events (shot put, javelin, club throw, and archery) but growth in both the number of events and participants developed quickly.

In 1952, a team from the Netherlands was invited to compete with the British team. This was the first International Stoke Mandeville Games, an event that is generally recognized as the precursor to the present-day Paralympic Games. The focus for NWAA and later, WSUSA, during the first four decades was competitive sports opportunities in the identified "core sports" for individuals utilizing wheelchairs for mobility. Following Mr. Lipton's tenure, the national office of NWAA moved to Colorado Springs, CO in 1982 in an effort to be closer to the National Governing Bodies of the core sports of NWAA recognized by the US Olympic Committee. It was during this time frame that NWAA played a key role in putting competitive sports for athletes with disabilities on the international stage by promoting a series of exhibition events in Wheelchair Track at the 1984 Olympic Games in Los Angeles.

From its earliest beginnings to the present day, Adaptive Sports USA has been directed and developed by wheelchair athletes and wheelchair sports enthusiasts themselves, individuals with a first-hand understanding of the values of participation. By and large, the needs of disabled athletes are unaddressed by the network of athletic programs available to non-disabled persons through educational systems and community recreation agencies. Instead, athletes with a disability have often developed their own resources and sports opportunities, from rules and governing structure (i.e., Adaptive Sports USA) to funding travel, equipment, and other expenses of competition. Adaptive sports enthusiasts are involved at all levels of decision-making in the Adaptive Sports USA, and its constituent associations. Adaptive Sports USA has remained essentially an all-volunteer organization sustained by the energy and commitment of its programs' beneficiaries.

In 1994, the organizational name was changed to Wheelchair Sports, USA to more accurately reflect the organization's mission. As a result of several Disabled Sports Organizations (DSO's) dissolving that represented the sporting interests for a specific segment of the disabled population, including organizations representing athletes with cerebral palsy and "Les Autres" athletes, Wheelchair Sports, USA found its mission changing dramatically from providing sports opportunities to individuals using wheelchairs to serving as a comprehensive competitive sports organization for all individuals with a disability, both ambulatory and non-ambulatory. As a result, the organization's name was changed to Wheelchair & Ambulatory Sports USA in 2010, followed by another name change in 2015 to Adaptive Sports USA in an effort to better describe the organization's evolved mission. Within this time frame, Adaptive Sports USA also entered into a formal relationship with the International Wheelchair & Ambulatory Sports Federation (IWAS), an offshoot of the International Stoke Mandeville Wheelchair Sports Federation. By virtue of this relationship, Adaptive Sports USA found itself with a mechanism for providing quality competitive opportunities for athletes seeking to establish themselves on an international stage. This relationship continues to the present.

Since 1984, Adaptive Sports USA has hosted the Adaptive Sports USA Junior Nationals, a popular competitive sports event for junior athletes (aged 6–22) with a disability in the United States. The event has had several titles in its 30 years of existence, including the National Junior Disability Championships (NJDC). The Junior Nationals is a week-long competition that includes archery, powerlifting, swimming, table tennis, track and field, and other sporting events.

=== Adaptive Sports USA Junior Nationals ===
Junior Nationals is an avenue for young athletes to showcase their abilities through sport and to promote physical activity and socialization. Additionally, the Championships serve as an opportunity for individuals to advance along the athlete pipeline that may one day lead them to compete at the international level and the Paralympic Games.

Junior Nationals began in 1984 with three sanctioned events for wheelchair athlete's ages 7 to 19 and is now the largest annual multi-sport event for juniors with physical disabilities and/or visual impairments in the United States. Junior Nationals is contested in a different city annually in July. This provides an opportunity for athletes to explore diverse areas of the country, travel costs to remain neutral and allows various Local Hosts the opportunity to gain experience in event management and build a legacy. Below is a history of the host cities:

  1984          Dover, Delaware
  1985		Fishersville, Virginia
  1986		Valley Forge, PA
  1987		Lawrenceville, NJ
  1988		Johnson City, TN
  1989		Cupertino, CA                           DeAnza College
  1990		Fort Collins, CO                        Colorado State University
  1991		Princeton, NJ                           Princeton University
  1992		Orlando, Florida                        Disney World
  1993		Columbus, Ohio                          Ohio State University
  1994		Edmond, Oklahoma                        Central Oklahoma University
  1995		Fort Collins, CO                        Colorado State University
  1996		Birmingham, AL                          Samford University
  1997		Mesa, Arizona                           Mesa High School
  1998		Bellevue, WA                           
  1999		Albuquerque, NM  
  2000		San Jose, CA                            San Jose State University
  2001		Piscataway, NJ                          Rutgers University
  2002		New London, CT                    
  2003		New London, CT
  2004		Mesa, Arizona                           Mountain View High School
  2005		Tampa, Florida
  2006		Tampa, Florida
  2007		Spokane, WA
  2008		Piscataway, NJ                          Rutgers University
  2009		St. Louis, Missouri
  2010		Lake Forest, IL
  2011		Saginaw, Michigan                       Saginaw State University
  2012		Mesa, Arizona                           Mesa Community College
  2013		Rochester, MN
  2014          Ames, IA                                Iowa State University
  2015          Iselin, NJ
  2016          Middleton, WI                           Middleton High School
  2017          Middleton, WI                           Middleton High School
  2018          Fort Wayne, IN                          Turnstone Foundation
  2019          Bloomington, MN                         Eden Prairie High School[10]

=== Structure ===
Adaptive Sports USA has three regions (Western, Central, and Eastern) made up of the respective member chapters of Adaptive Sports USA, dividing the United States for the purpose of coordinating, assisting, and implementing local and regional meets; sanctioned, qualifying meets; and workshops and clinics for athletes and coaches in order to develop skills and knowledge. Adaptive Sports USA also serves as support and consultation to state high school associations, conferences, and schools that desire to provide inclusive opportunities to their student athletes in the areas of archery, powerlifting, swimming, table tennis, and track and field.

Adaptive Sports USA	Regional Councils (Eastern, Central, Western)	Local Chapters
Adaptive Sports USA	National Governing Bodies	Track / Field
Adaptive Sports USA	Sport Technical Committees	Archery; Powerlifting; Swimming; Table Tennis; Air Rifle; Air Pistol; Fencing

== Disabled Sports USA ==
Disabled Sports USA was established in 1967 as the National Amputee Skiers Association; among its founders was Jim Winthers, an amputee soldier who was a veteran of the 10th Mountain Division.

== Activities ==
Move United offer numerous nationwide programs for individuals with physical disabilities, including:

=== Ski Spectacular ===
Operating annually since 1987, the event is one of the nation's largest winter sports events for people with a disability with more than 700 participants ranging in ability from first-time skiers to members of the US Paralympic Alpine Skiing National Team coming together. Participants of all ages participate in snow sports made accessible by adaptive equipment, and certified professionals and volunteers. Programs offered at The Hartford Ski Spectacular help strengthen and expand adaptive ski programs in communities throughout the U.S.; identify and train youth, wounded warriors, and others with disabilities including those who strive to be winter Paralympians; and help local DSUSA chapters improve their services. A week of ski race training prepares athletes for the Paralympic Games.

=== Move United Warfighter ===
Move United Warfighter offers sports rehabilitation programs in military hospitals, including Walter Reed National Military Medical Center, Brooke Army Medical Center and Naval Medical Center San Diego, and communities across the U.S. through a nationwide network of over 150 community-based chapters. The Move United Warfighter program rebuilds lives through sports by improving self-confidence, promoting independence and uniting families through shared healthy activities.

Move United Warfighters offers more than 50 winter and summer sports at more than 100 events each year, for wounded members of the United States Armed Forces with amputations, traumatic brain injury, spinal cord injury, visual impairments, and significant nerve and muscle damage. In 2013, over 1,500 severely wounded warriors were provided adaptive sports opportunities.

=== Challenge Magazine ===
Challenge Magazine, published three times each year for over 10 years, provides over 35,000 subscribers the latest news and articles on sports for people with disabilities.

== Harris Poll validates effectiveness of adaptive sports ==
In 2009, Move United commissioned Harris Interactive to conduct research among American adults with physical disabilities in order to explore the attitudes and behaviors of people with disabilities towards sports and recreation. Specifically, the new research determine that being engaged in sports activities has helped make a difference in terms of increased health, happiness and employment. The major finding of the poll of 1,000 people with disabilities was that "people with disabilities who indicate that they are physically active are more likely to be employed, to believe that being physically active has helped them advance in their jobs, and to lead to a healthier lifestyle. Those physically active report a greater life satisfaction and are more sociable and positive about their life prospects."

== Awards ==
Move United administers three national awards for individuals or organizations who have made significant achievements in disabled sports.

=== National Disabled Ski Hall of Fame Award ===
The Disabled Hall of Fame Award recognizes outstanding individuals who have made significant contributions to disabled skiing in two categories: Recreational/Developmental and Competition. The award in the Recreational/Development category recognizes an individual who has a minimum of five-years of experience in the disabled skiing field and has made a significant contribution to the field, including innovative techniques, specialized equipment, program development, education or public relations. The award in the Competition category recognizes an individual (participant or coach), who has been active in disabled ski racing for a minimum of three years. Race results, team participation, innovative coaching techniques, and event promotions are considered for this category. Competitive racers and coaches must be retired from active racing or coaching for a minimum of three years prior to nomination.

The National Disabled Ski Hall of Fame Award
Year	Competition	Recreation/Development
2018	Willie Stewart	John Humbrecht
2017	Mary Riddell	Geoff Krill
2016	Jon "JK" Kreamelmeyer	Kirsten Atkins
2015	Brian Santos, Ray Watkins	Bill Bowness
2014	Candace Cable	Katherine Hayes-Rodriguez
2013	Jason Lalla	Gene Gamber
2012	Muffy Davis	Kathy Chandler
2011	Monte Meiers	Dr. Bob Harney
2010	Sarah Will	Meeche White
2009	Steve Cook	Bob Meserve
2008	Sarah Billmeier	Bobby Palm
2007	Greg Manino	Peter Axelson
2006	Chris Waddell	Sandy Trombetta
2003	Jim Martinson	Beth Fox, Doug Keil
2001	Fred Tassone	Gwen Allard, Dr. Duane Messner, Dr. Frand Chang
2000	Danny Puffpaff	Norbert Fischer
1999	Shannon Bloedel	Dollie Armstrong
1998	David Jamison	Rod Hernley
1997	Doug Pringle	Hal O'Leary
1996	Jack Benedick	Jim Winthers & Paul Leimkuehler
1995	Diana Golden	Willie Williams

=== Jim Winthers Volunteer Award ===
The Jim Winthers Volunteer Award recognizes life-time contributions and significant achievements in furthering the mission of Move United. Nominees for this award must have contributed a minimum of 10 years of service to Disabled Sports USA or one of its chapters. The Jim Winthers Volunteer Award is named in honor of Jim Winthers, a WWII veteran who was a member of the U.S. 10th Mountain Division- the Skiing 10th — an elite group specifically trained for alpine warfare. He eventually became a pioneer in teaching adaptive skiing, beginning with two friends who became amputees in the war; he taught them to ski on one leg using techniques he was in Europe. Jim Winthers, with the support of other veterans, founded Disabled Sports USA in 1967.

The Jim Winthers Volunteer Award
Year	Awardee
2019	Susan Hodder
2018	Mark Kulzer
2017	Steve Goodwin
2016	Earl Johnson
2015	Tony Santilli
2014	Tom Trevithick
2013	Liz Craveiro
2012	Al Kaye
2011	Mike "Milty" Miltner
2010	Michael Zuckerman
2009	Bill Bowness
2008	Dr. Bob Harney
2007	Bart Dekker
2006	Bill Demby
2005	John and Cathy Sarubbi
2004	Beth Fox
2003	Susan Michalski
2002	Bob Guerrero
2001	Sandy Trombetta
2000	Katherine Hayes Rodriguez
1999	Gwen Allard
1997	Mike Hulett
1996	James Voltz
1995	James Thweat
1994	Doug Sato
1992	Hal O'Leary
1991	Jan Morrissey
1990	Rod Hernley
1989	Fred Tassone
1988	Ed Lucks and United Airlines Volunteers
1987	Mary and Earl Plummer
1986	Dr. Duane Messner
1985	David Spencer
1984	Jack Benedick
1983	Ben Allen
1982	Paul Liemkuehler
1981	Jerry Groswald
1980	Bill Stieler

=== The Dr. Robert Harney Leadership Award ===
The Dr. Robert Harney Leadership Award is an annual award to honor a company, organization or an individual that has demonstrated and provided extraordinary leadership in the adaptive sports movement. "Dr. Bob" was an adaptive sports pioneer and tireless leader in Paralympic sports at the local, national and international levels. He was an innovator in the national and international medial classification of athletes with disabilities.

As a volunteer, Harney was on the International Paralympic Medical Classification team in the sports of alpine skiing and cycling and attended every winter and summer games since 1998. Dr. Bob was also a Professional Ski Instructor and a full-time practicing orthopedic surgeon in Boston, and a dedicated team physician at Winthrop and Melrose High School in his hometown of Winthrop, Massachusetts for more than 20 years.

Year	Awardee
2018	Lakeshore Foundation
2017	U.S. Department of Veterans Affairs
2016	Robert "Bob" Meserve
2015	Professional Ski Instructors of America-American Association of Snowboard Instructors
2014	USA Hockey
2013	Adaptive Spirit
2012	The Hartford
