= Carter G. Woodson High School =

C. G. Woodson High School
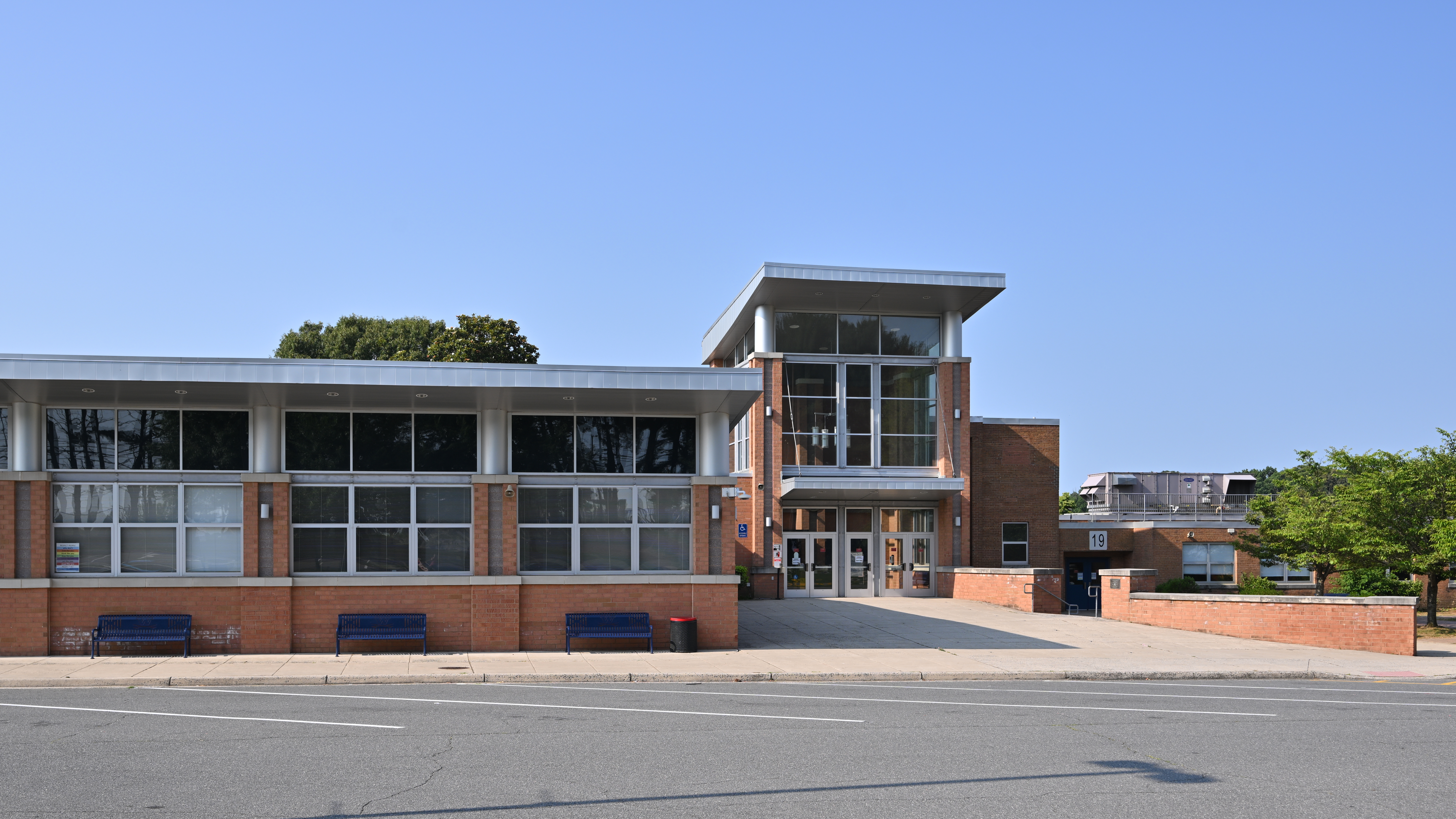
- Main entrance to Woodson High School

Location
- 9525 Main Street; Fairfax, Virginia 22031; United States; 38°50′25″N 77°16′31″W

Information
- School type: Public, high school
- Founded: August 4, 1962; 64 years ago
- School district: FCPS
- Principal: Kevin Greata
- Teaching staff: 198.82 (FTE) (2023–24)
- Grades: 9–12
- Enrollment: 2,796 (2025–26)
- Student to teacher ratio: 12.43 (2023–24)
- Campus: Suburban
- Colors: Navy blue Red; White
- Athletics conference: Patriot District; Northern Region
- Nickname: Cavaliers
- USNWR ranking: #337 (2022)
- Newspaper: The Cavalcade
- Yearbook: The Cavalier
- Feeder schools: Frost Middle School
- Website: woodsonhs.fcps.edu
- Last updated: March 28, 2023; 3 years ago

Carter G. Woodson High School, commonly known as C. G. Woodson High School or simply Woodson, (formerly Wilbert Tucker Woodson High School) is an American public high school located in Fairfax County, Virginia, just outside the east end of the city of Fairfax limits, opposite the shopping center on Main Street.

It has consistently ranked in the top 10 schools in Virginia by U.S. News & World Report.

The school opened in 1962 and was once the largest school in the state. It was originally named for W. T. Woodson, who served as Fairfax County School Superintendent from 1929 to 1961. In 2024, it was renamed for Carter G. Woodson, a historian and dean at Howard University and West Virginia State University, considered the "Father of Black History".

As of 2025–2026, the student population was 2,796. Woodson has the largest campus in Fairfax County in size of area, and also houses Woodson Adult High School, a separate education facility run by FCPS that allows adults to earn their GEDs and HS diplomas. Woodson has appeared multiple times on Newsweek magazine's lists of top or best high schools, including No. 23 (2003), No. 34 (2005), No. 90 (2006), and No. 74 (2008). Woodson has also appeared on the top high schools lists from U.S. News & World Report: No. 90 (2008), No. 116 (2013), No. 200 (2016), No. 365 (2019), and No. 280 (2020).

== Demographics ==
For the 2025–26 school year, Woodson High School's student body was 46.82% white non-Hispanic, 24.73% Asian, 14.53% Hispanic, 5.71% black, and 8.22% Other.

== Renovation ==
Woodson began the process of renovating all of its facilities in 2005 and adding several classrooms. The project was paid for in bonds that were established in 2003 by a voter referendum. The issue of whether to renovate had been debated for several years before the plan was approved. Woodson was one of the oldest schools in Fairfax County Public Schools, as the main facilities (plumbing, heating/cooling, floors, electrical) were still fundamentally the same as they were when the structure was built. The renovations nearly doubled the square footage of the school.

The project was completed in 2009. The renovation consisted of complete renovation to all existing interior spaces, as well as adding to the performing arts and athletic wings, creating a new administration wing with a new front entrance, highlighted by a large tower and the addition of a new science classroom wing and two student drop off areas.

== Activities, groups, and programs ==
Woodson's mascot is a Cavalier and the sports teams play in the AAA Patriot District and the Northern Region. In 1976, the Washington Diplomats of the North American Soccer League used the school's stadium as their home field. In a Diplomats game on June 27, 1976, soccer legend Pelé, playing for the New York Cosmos, scored a goal in a game held at Woodson.

=== Publications ===
The Cavalcade is the school newspaper. The Cavalier, Woodson's yearbook, is a AAA publication.

== Communities served by Woodson ==
Several unincorporated areas, such as Mantua, Olde Creek, Canterbury Woods, Truro, Rutherford, Long Branch, and Wakefield Forest are served by Woodson.

== Woodson in the news ==
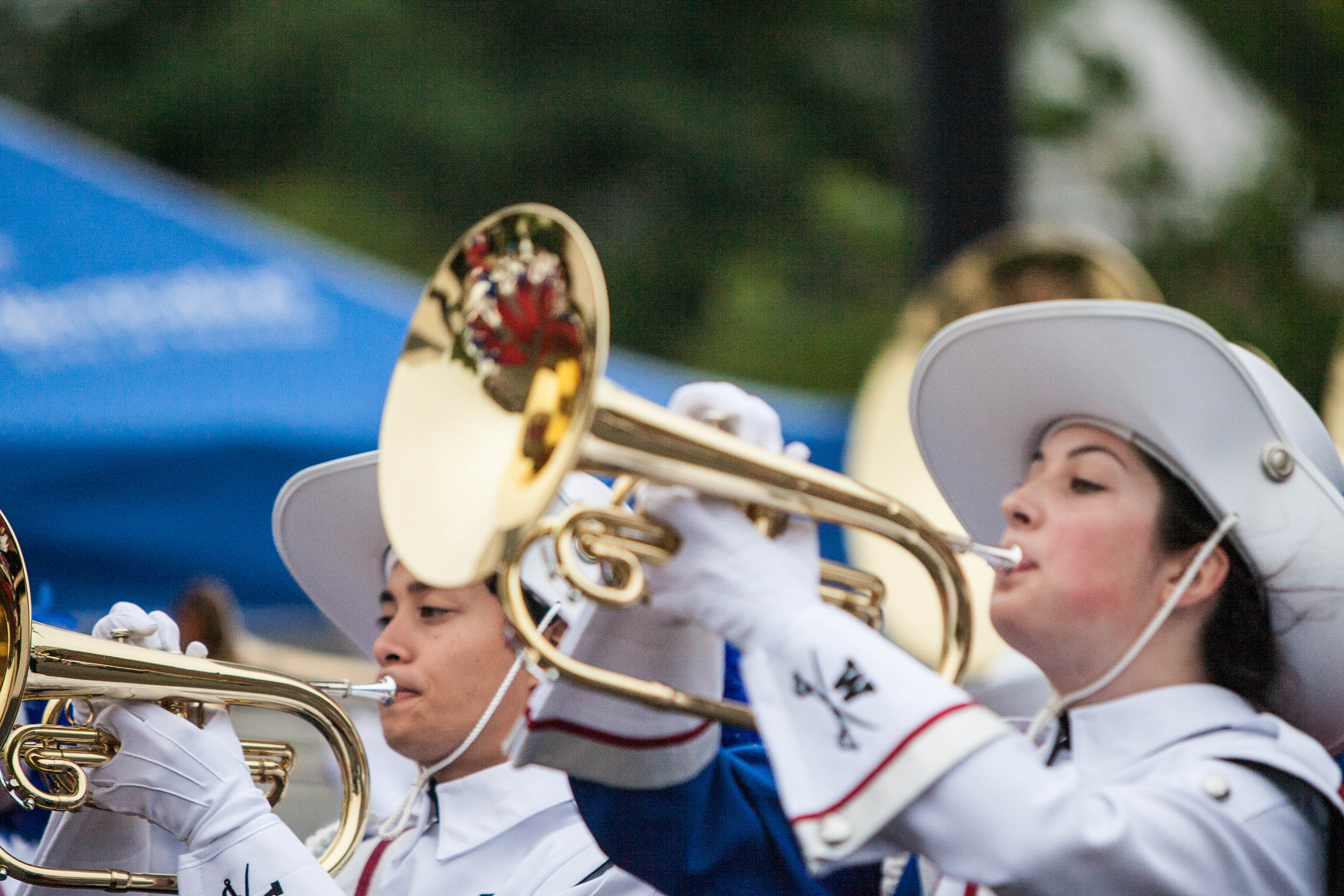
- The W.T. Woodson Band
  On April 1, 1973, a strong tornado struck Woodson High School and ripped off the roof. It was hit on a Sunday and no injuries were reported among the 65-75 people playing basketball in the school gymnasium. The students did a split shift with Oakton High School to finish out the school year. Graduation ceremonies were held on their home football field.
- A second tornado spawned by the remains of Hurricane David severely damaged the school's stadium on September 5, 1979, causing an estimated $45,000 in damage.
- On October 30, 2015, five students and a teacher were injured in an accidental fire caused by a chemistry experiment. Two of the injured students were airlifted to a local hospital, one of whom was left in critical condition. The incident received coverage from the Washington Post, and New York Times. The event also prompted a statement from the U.S. Chemical Safety Board, who considered launching an investigation into the incident, but eventually opted against doing so.
- On January 30, 2022, a fire broke out in one of the school's administrative buildings adjacent to the main school building. Investigators did not determine a reason for the fire, which was reported to have caused $8.8 million in damages. The remains of the building would eventually be scheduled for demolition.
- In November 2026, longtime band director Aaron Morgan was arrested and charged with possession of child sexual abuse material (CSAM) and solicitation.

== Suicide and mental health crisis ==
Between 2011 and 2014, six Woodson students died by suicide. Woodson continues to be considered among the top high schools in Virginia, and some parents pointed to the school's competitive environment as a possible cause for the poor mental health of its students. Following the suicides of 2014, the Virginia officials requested assistance from the Center for Disease Control and Prevention, the primary public health agency of the US federal government. CDC officials were sent to Northern Virginia to conduct focus group activities that attempted to identify possible causes of the suicides. Woodson itself also received $50,000 in federal aid for use in implementing mental health resources for its students. Another suicide of a Woodson student was reported in 2017.

== Notable alumni ==
- Dave Aitel, CTO and Founder of Immunity, Inc.
- Tommy Amaker, point guard for Duke University (1983–1987) and men's basketball coach for Seton Hall (1997–2001), the University of Michigan (2001–2007) and Harvard University (2007–present)
- Heman Bekele, inventor and Time Kid of the Year 2024
- Loryn Brantz, American author
- Bob Cesca, columnist/blogger for The Huffington Post, creator of anime series Kung Fu Jimmy Chow and web cartoon Napster Bad
- David Chase, Broadway music director and arranger
- Catherine Coleman, astronaut
- Denise Dowse, actor, director, producer
- Debra Meloy Elmegreen, astronomer, Vassar College emerita professor, former President of the International Astronomical Union and the American Astronomical Society, Fellow of the American Academy of Arts and Sciences
- Robert F. Godec, U.S. ambassador to Thailand, former ambassador to Tunisia and Kenya
- Clarence Goodson, former member of the United States men's national soccer team
- Tim Gunn, author, academic, and television personality
- Andy Heck, pro-football player (1989–2002), currently the offensive line coach for the Kansas City Chiefs, 2× Super Bowl champion (LIV, LVII)
- Chris Knoche, former coach of the American University Eagles men's basketball team, color commentator for the Maryland Terrapins men's basketball broadcasts
- Michael Lahoud, former professional soccer player
- Steve Marino, professional golfer
- Chris McCandless, Alaskan traveler, subject of the nonfiction work Into the Wild by Jon Krakauer and subsequent film.
- David W. Marsden, Senate of Virginia representative for the 37th District.
- Michael P. Mullin, Virginia House of Delegates Representative for the 93rd District.
- Thomas J. Perrelli, Associate Attorney General of the United States under former president Obama
- Jessica Rogers, Founder of iSACRA, American wheelchair racer, basketballer, and swimmer
- Austin St. John, actor
- Abe Thompson, former professional soccer player, all-time leader scorer at the University of Maryland, College Park with 112 points, last played with the Fort Lauderdale Strikers.
- Michael Weiss, U. S. skating and Olympic champion
- Jennifer Wilson, opera singer

== Photo gallery ==
School photos

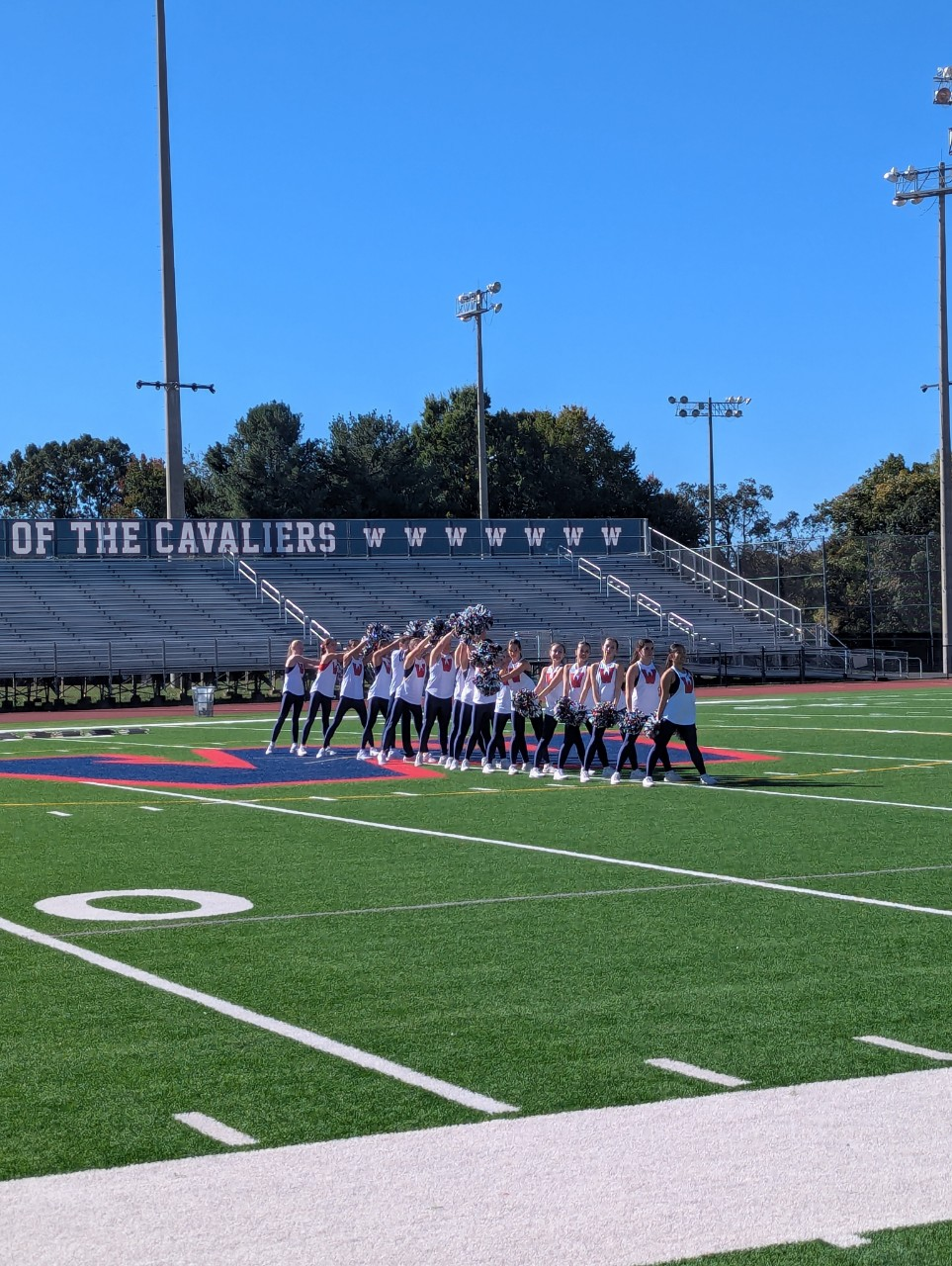
Fall pep rally 2025

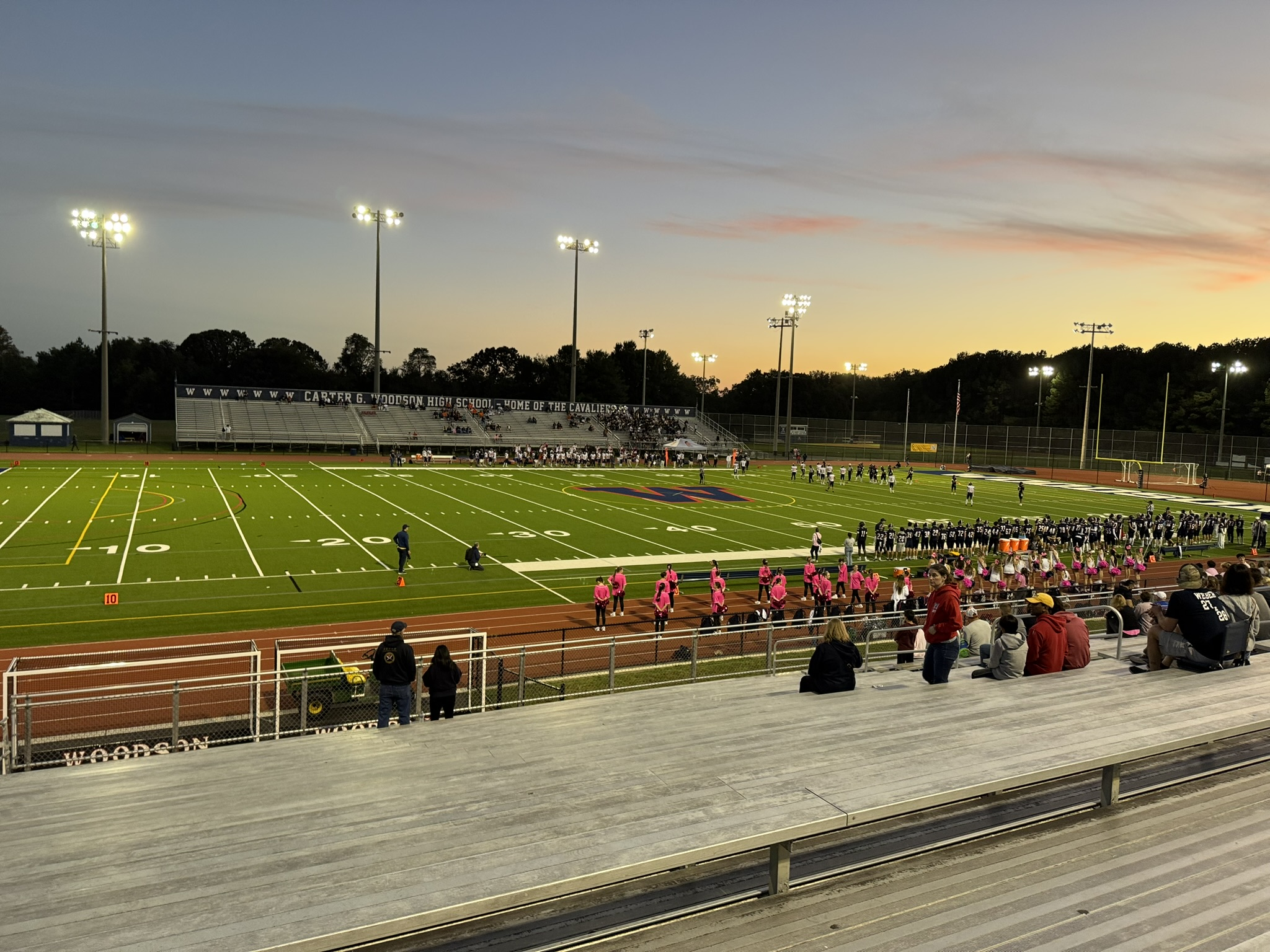
Varsity football game

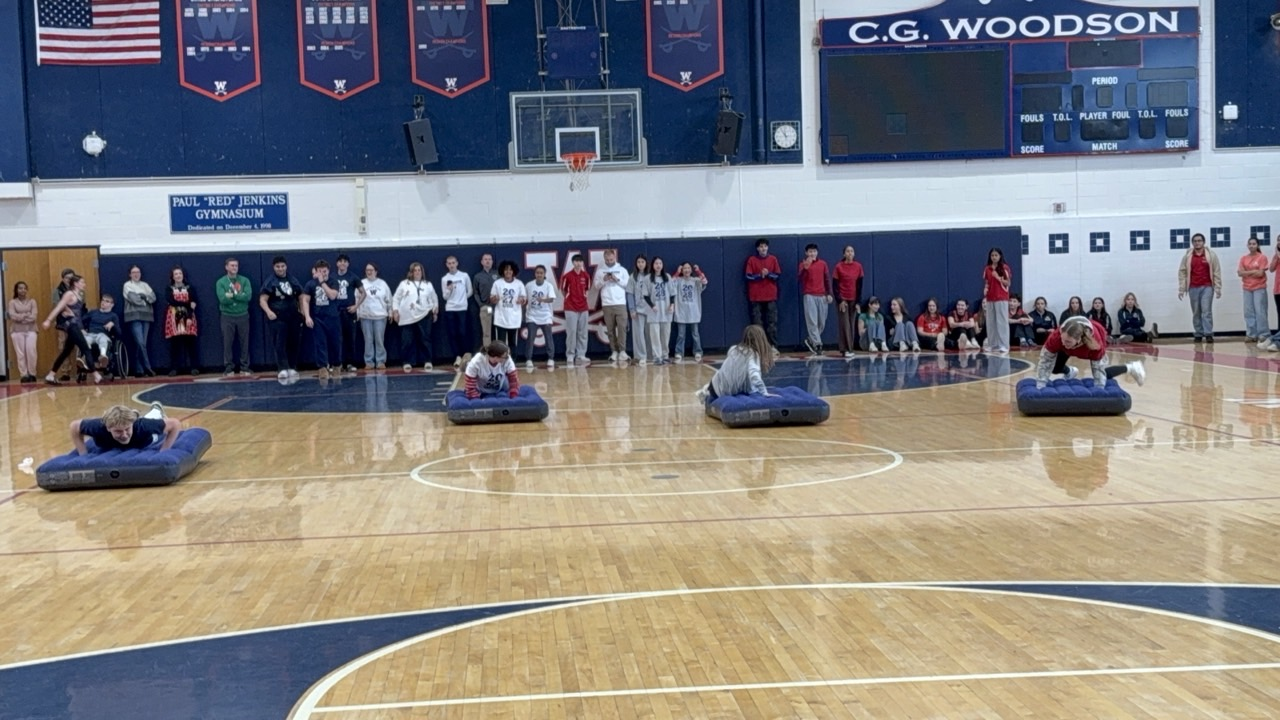
Playing a game at the 2025 winter pep rally
