= Chris Knoche =

American basketball coach

Chris Knoche (/ˈnɒki/; born December 29, 1957) is an American former college basketball coach. He was the head coach of the American University Eagles men's basketball program from the 1990–91 season to the 1996–97 season. Knoche is currently in his 12th season as the color analyst for the Maryland Terrapins men's basketball broadcasts. Knoche attended Wilbert Tucker Woodson High School in Fairfax, Virginia, where started on the varsity basketball team in his junior and senior seasons under coach "Red" Jenkins.

== Head coaching record ==
Record table
Season	Team	Overall	Conference	Standing	Postseason
American Eagles (Colonial Athletic Association) (1990–1997)
1990–91	American	15–14	8–6	3rd	
1991–92	American	11–18	8–6	3rd	
1992–93	American	11–17	6–8	4th	
1993–94	American	8–19	5–9	7th	
1994–95	American	9–19	7–7	5th	
1995–96	American	12–15	8–8	4th	
1996–97	American	11–16	7–9	7th	
American:		77–118 (.395)	49–53 (.480)		
Total:		77–118 (.395)			
