= Heman Bekele =

Ethiopian American inventor and scientific researcher

- Born: Addis Ababa, Ethiopia
- Awards: 3M Young Scientist Challenge (2023); Time Kid of the Year (2024)
- Scientific career
- Fields: Biomedical research, materials science

Heman Bekele is an Ethiopian American inventor and scientific researcher. He developed a soap prototype designed to deliver cancer-fighting treatments, earning recognition through various science competitions, including the 3M Young Scientist Challenge and the Gloria Barron Prize for Young Heroes.

== Early life and education ==
Bekele was born in Addis Ababa, Ethiopia, and emigrated to the United States with his family at the age of four. He grew up in Annandale, Virginia, with his parents, Muluemebet, a teacher, and Wondwossen, a human resources specialist at the U.S. Agency for International Development. He has two sisters.

Bekele's early exposure to the harsh sun in Ethiopia, where laborers worked with minimal protection, shaped his understanding of the risks associated with prolonged ultraviolet exposure. His interest in science developed during childhood, spurred by his experimentation with household chemicals and the gift of a chemistry set before his seventh birthday. Bekele attended Wakefield Forest Elementary School (Fairfax County, Virginia), Robert Frost Middle School and later enrolled at Carter G. Woodson High School.

== Research ==
Bekele's cancer research began when he was eleven years old, prompted by the lack of affordable healthcare and the prevalence of sun exposure in Ethiopia. Drawing on his memories and growing understanding of skin cancer, Bekele conceptualized a soap capable of delivering cancer-fighting treatments. He developed his idea further while preparing for the 3M Young Scientist Challenge in 2023. After creating a video pitch, Bekele was selected as one of ten finalists and eventually won the competition, earning the title of America's Top Young Scientist.

The soap prototype, called Skin Cancer Treating Soap (SCTS), uses lipid-based nanoparticles to deliver a cancer-fighting compound to the skin. Bekele’s design is intended to make treatment accessible and affordable, with a per-unit cost of less than ten dollars.

Bekele’s research progressed significantly with the mentorship of Deborah Isabelle, a product engineering specialist from 3M, and a collaboration with Vito Rebecca who is a molecular biologist at Johns Hopkins Bloomberg School of Public Health.

Bekele presented to over 8,000 attendees at the National Academy of Future Physicians and Medical Scientists in Boston. He received the Gloria Barron Prize for Young Heroes in 2024, which provided a $10,000 grant to support his research. He was named Time Kid of the Year in 2024.

According to Isabelle, future plans involve the development of clinical trials within five to ten years, but as of 2023, Bekele's work has primarily involved computational data assessment and modeling. Bekele's long-term goals include obtaining U.S. Food and Drug Administration (FDA) approval for his soap and founding a nonprofit to distribute it globally by 2028.

Bekele's work has been generally well-received, but some critics point out that he has not followed standard scientific practices, such as publishing in peer-reviewed journals. This makes it difficult to assess the true impact of his research. Available information suggests that the key active ingredient, imiquimod, has been used for years in topical treatments, such as creams, for skin cancer. What appears to be innovative is the use of imiquimod in soap and the incorporation of "lipid nanoparticles."
