= Sophia Bekele =

Ethiopian-American businesswoman

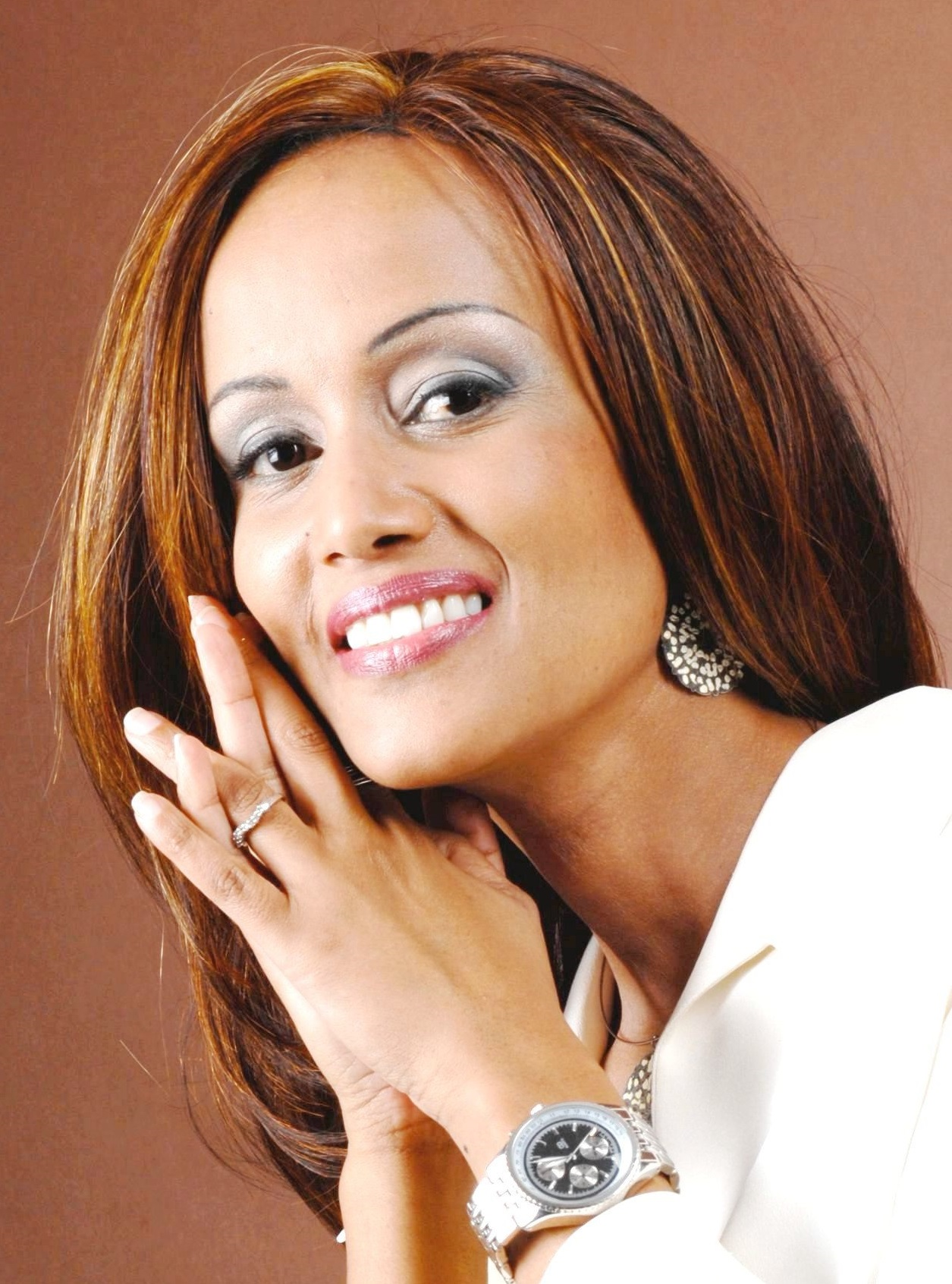
- Bekele in 2013
- Born: Sophia Bekele Eshete; Addis Ababa, Ethiopia
- Education: San Francisco State University (BSc.); Golden Gate University (M.B.A.)
- Occupations: Entrepreneur, Businesswoman, Corporate Executive, Consultant Founder CEO of CBS International (CBSegroup)
- Years active: 1993–present
- Notable work: African Union Fiber Network Infrastructure, Ethiopian Parliament Bid, IDNs, .africa, Miss.Africa Digital
- Title: Founder and CEO of DCA Group; Founder and CEO of CBSegroup; Founder and CEO of SbCnet
- Website: sophiabekele.com

Sophia Bekele Eshete (Amharic: ሶፍያ በቀለ; Addis Ababa, Ethiopia) is an entrepreneur, corporate executive, governance and risk management specialist, policy advisor on ICT, Internet and cybersecurity, public commentator, and philanthropist.

As an entrepreneur, Bekele has founded and run various companies and initiatives. She is presently the founder and CEO of DotConnectAfrica (DCA) Group based in Mauritius and has a presence in East Africa and the USA. She is the founder of a 6 year "Yes2dotAfrica" global awareness campaign, for re-branding Africa using the .africa top-level internet domain name and founder and CEO of tech start-ups, CBSegroup in California and SbCommunications Network (SbCnet) plc, based in Addis Ababa. Aside from her entrepreneurship ventures, Bekele worked for multinational Fortune 500 Companies in the US.

She has frequently been quoted in the media for her candid views, as well as spoken regularly on international forums and made public affairs commentary through published articles

== Early life and family ==
Bekele is the daughter of Ato Bekele Eshete Wolde Michael a founder and former Board Director of United Bank, S.C and United Insurance, S.C in Ethiopia and Sister Mulualem Beyene Engida, a medical nurse. She attended a private Catholic high school and then traveled to America for higher education.

== Higher education ==
Bekele holds a Bachelor's Degree in Business Analysis and Information Systems from San Francisco State University and a Master of Business Administration from Golden Gate University.

She is a Certified Information Systems Auditor (CISA), Certified Control Specialist (CCS), and certified in the Governance of Enterprise IT (CGEIT), certifications issued to professionals in the field of IS Audit, Security & Enterprise IT governance principles and practices.

== Honorary mentions ==
In 2023, Bekele was recognized and awarded as the "10 Most Powerful Women Leaders in Business to Follow in 2023, by US based Success Pitchers Magazine selecting her for their cover feature story as a "Serial Lifestyle Techprenure, changing lives and businesses through innovation". In 2022, She was enlisted as one of the "100 Most Influential African Women Leaders & Pioneers" by the Leading African PR & Rating firm, Avance Media, noting "Sophia is among the Most Influential African Women, working to inspire the continent through her Excellence business leadership and performance, Personal accomplishments, her commitment to sharing knowledge and her continuous effort to break the gender digital divide in Africa". In 2021, Bekele was dubbed as "Women of Influence" Honoree, by Silicon Valley Business Journal, which celebrates women of outstanding achievement in their industry and community. In 2018, Bekele received a Champion of Development Award by the AfricaLink Solidarity Awards in Switzerland for her work on Miss.Africa Digital program, which enables young women and girls to benefit from training opportunities or financial grants administered via annual competition. In 2017 the UN ITU and UN Women also recognized her for the same, as Miss.Africa was named finalist by the Equals in Tech Awards. The same year, the CIO East Africa recognized Bekele as an "Industry Trailblazer" and "Internet Governance Pioneer In 2013, she was named as "leading ladies in Africa's ICT sector" by Bloomberg TV, In the same year she was listed among the "50 Trailblazers – A future made in Africa" by the UK's NewAfrican Magazine, an IC Publications group, which published a "Collector's Edition" that coincided with the continent's 50th anniversary celebrations of the African Union". In 2005, Bekele was presented with a Paul Harris Fellow award for her contributions in the various works of International Rotary Clubs

== Public service ==
In public service to various organizations, Bekele was appointed in 2018 as a founding advisory member to the EurAfrican Forum Board. Elected to the Internet Corporation for Assigned Names and Numbers (ICANN) Council of the gNSO (Generic Names Supporting Organization), a body that advised on global internet policy on domain names in 2005 Co-Founded and served as a director on the Internet Society ISOC San Francisco chapter based in San Francisco in 2008. Bekele represented the private sector in discussions about ICT and the economic development of Africa while on the UN-ICT Taskforce and UNECA-sponsored African Information Society Initiative (AISI) in 2002. and appointed in 2003 on the UNECA sponsored East African Representative to the African Regional Network (ARN). Bekele has advised to the Global Alliance for Information and Communication Technologies and Development (UNGAID) and the joint initiative of United Nations Public Administration Network and International Telecommunication Union (UNPAN/ITU) in 2009, representing the private sector in discussions about Public Private Partnerships (PPP), e-government and MDG implementation. She was elected for two terms to serve on the Golden Gate University's alumni Board.

== Career ==
Bekele was recruited out of college by Bank of America and later held managerial positions with UnionBanCal Corporation and PriceWaterhouseCoopers working in Information Security.

=== Entrepreneurship ===
In 2006, Bekele founded DotConnectAfrica, a private Trust organization, which she formed to champion Internet access in Africa and serve as a platform to realize charitable projects aimed at giving back to the community, such as the dotafrica gTLD, the miss. Africa and the generation.africa program to empower girls and young people in Africa in the field of technology and STEM. She soon set up DCA Registry to apply for the .africa Internet Top Level Domain Name at ICANN in 2012. In 2021, she reorganized the DCA Trust under the DCA Group to serve as CSR while the DCA Group started offering technology-related products and services.

Previously, she set up and ran CBS International. Currently, CBSegroup, the California based company, is focused on technology transfer to emerging economies to provide international technology procurement, project-based capacity building, technological project management, internet/intranet systems integration, and Internet-related solutions, including digital marketing. Concurrently, she launched SbCommunications Network, plc (SbCnet) based in Addis Ababa, Ethiopia, which specialized in systems integration, technology integration, and support services. Through her two companies, she bid and successfully commissioned international contracts for building large-scale projects, including the first fiber-based internet technology infrastructure for the Organization of African Unity (AU) General Secretariat and an e-government Internet-working project initiative sponsored by UNDP (United Nations Development Programme) for the Ethiopian parliament, House of Peoples' Representatives and House of Federation. Both projects involved implementing a complex fiber-optic-based campus-wide area network and an integrated data networking infrastructure. Her companies CBSegroup handled technological inputs and services procurement from US, while SbCnet provided strategic technology integration services and field management

=== International Domain Names (IDNs) ===
During her tenure at ICANN from 2005-2007 and the Council of the GNSO (Generic Names Supporting Organization), Bekele was among those who initiated a policy dialogue over IDNs as well as developing the framework for leading a language group to introduce IDNs under which new Internet Domain names in Arabic, Cyrillic, Russian, Chinese and non-Latin alphabets will become available, thereby providing non-English/non-Latin language native speakers an opportunity to access and communicate on the Internet in their native languages. This global IDN group, called the International Domain Resolution Union (IDRU), gave a testimonial to Bekele's work over IDNs. The IDNs are now introduced by ICANN under the auspices of the current new gTLD program

=== .africa ===
In 2006, while at ICANN, Bekele turned her focus to initiate and champion the .africa – a new generic Top-Level Domain (gTLD) for the Africa geographic name. The project has been introduced and is now delegated for operation under ICANN's new gTLD programme.

Bekele started the DotAfrica initiative following experiences gained from her work as gNSO advisor to ICANN. Bekele made a clear case for a DotAfrica (.africa) gTLD for Africa within ICANN and also the global Internet Community on behalf of the global African and Pan-African constituency. She soon led the .africa initiative with DotConnectAfrica, introducing it to the Pan-African inter-governmental organizations – the United Nations Economic Commission for Africa (UNECA) and the African Union Commission (AUC) and received endorsement for DCA.

Enterprise Technology Magazine called her "Sophia Bekele: Champion of .africa initiative" CIO East Africa calling her views "controversial" on who should run gTLDs, saying, "Sophia Bekele has been in the news if not for promoting DotConnectAfrica's bid for the DotAfrica geographical gTLD for the past three years, then in a controversial statement about the same":

Governments have a role to play, especially regarding the establishment of an enabling and supportive environment for ICT initiatives to thrive. However, there is a role for everybody, and global Internet governance is currently based on a multi-stakeholder modeled by ICANN. Governments already have their two-code country-level top-level domains (cc TLDs), but they also have a role to endorse geographical gTLDs. The problem is that this power to endorse is often interpreted and extended to include overall sovereignty over the new gTLD. We believe this should not be the case since it is monopolistic and anti-competitive coupled with problems of lack of transparency and accountability...

— Sophia Bekele, in an interview on 09 March 2012, for the main story of CIO East Africa

As the CEO of the DCA Registry Services Limited based in Kenya, Bekele had led a multi-national team of experts to prepare and submit an application for the DotAfrica (.AFRICA) generic Top-Level Domain. DotConnectAfrica has already submitted an application in May 2012 for the .africa (pronounced as 'DotAfrica') geographic name string to the Internet Corporation for Assigned Names and Numbers (ICANN)

== Philanthropy ==
=== Miss.Africa Digital ===
In 2007, Bekele initiated and launched the Miss.Africa Digital program is a gender-focused initiative primarily targeted at female youth audiences across the African continent. The program aims to increase girls' involvement in early technology use and adoption, enhance their digital self-awareness and empowerment, and bridge the economic divide through employment or entrepreneurship. The initiative was first launched and publicized during the ICANN gala event in Singapore and continued through ICANN Dakar. In 2015, the Miss.Africa Annual Seed Fund competition program was inaugurated, running Africa-wide and providing grants to women and girls who have submitted original projects in the fields of Science, Technology, Engineering, and Mathematics (STEM). The grant aims to support these women in launching or furthering their own initiatives. The program has been globally recognized as a finalist by the ITU and UN Women Equals in Tech Awards. Currently, the program is sponsored and administered by the DCA Digital Academy, which operates under the umbrella of DCA Trust, the Corporate Social Responsibility (CSR) arm of DCA Group. As of 2022, the seed-fund program has made a positive impact in 15 African countries.

== Overcoming challenges ==
Bekele's entrepreneurship journey was not without challenges In Africa. She has faced many transparency and accountability issues in the government bids she participated in. The Ethiopian Parliament project bid was originally awarded to Bekele's competitor, whereas Bekele's company was second on the list. Bekele complained and requested the Auditor General's office to investigate. The bid was audited, and she successfully prevailed after nine months of publicly contesting the bid. and it was determined that the awarding of the contract had been improper. The Parliament reversed the decision and awarded the bid to Bekele's company in 2002.

The fourteen-year journey of .africa faced similar issues of accountability and transparency over the bid for .africa, including ICANN's handling of the bid process and the African Union Commission(AUC) who allegedly disavowed the first endorsement they gave her organization DotConnectAfrica in 2009 to subsequently requesting for the same directly from ICANN, at the ICANN 42 International meeting held in Dakar Senegal from 23–28 October 2011. The AUC requested ICANN to include all similar name strings ".africa," ".afrique," and ".afriqia", in the list of "reserved names", to afford special legislative protection to the AUC to own these strings to make them unavailable to anyone, through a method of bypassing the formal application process of the ICANN's new generic top-level domains (gTLDs). Bekele opposed the AUC's request in Dakar after publicly asserting the request's violation of ICANN procedures and prevailed. As a result, ICANN could not reserve the names for the AU; however, ICANN did recommend to the AUC to use the Government Advisory Committee to raise concerns that an applicant is seen as potentially sensitive or problematic or to provide direct advice to the Board, to change the outcome of the gTLD. AUC implemented the advice during the GAC objection period at the detriment of DCA and subsequently went ahead to directly endorsed another firm from SouthAfrica to apply to ICANN, who its own AU Dotafrica Task Force also supported.

According to the public part of their application, the South African company submitted a "non-community" application to ICANN naming AUC as a "co-applicant" and giving the .africa registry and intellectual property rights to the AUC in a separate contract These were later challenged through the DCA Vs ICANN IRP case overseen by the constituted .africa International Tribunal. On 9 July 2015, the .Africa IRP International Tribunal in its final declaration[109] ruled that DCA Trust, was the prevailing party. The Tribunal also recommended that ICANN continue to refrain from delegating the .AFRICA gTLD and permit DCA Trust's application to proceed through the remainder of the new gTLD application process. The Tribunal further declared that ICANN is to bear, pursuant to Article IV, Section 3, paragraph 18 of the Bylaws, Article 11 of Supplementary Procedures, and Article 31 of the ICDR Rules, the totality of the costs of this IRP and the totality of the costs of the IRP Provider.

Following the July 2015 IRP ruling, Bekele's organization, DCA Trust, took ICANN to court over how it handled the IRP declaration on April 12, 2016. Following this, a United States District Court, Central District Of California - Western Division, has granted a Preliminary Injunction for DotConnectAfrica, the decision for case no. 16-CV-00862 RGK (JCx) [PDF] The ruling detailed among other things that The balance of equities tips in favor of granting the preliminary injunction. This also follows a March 4, 2016 ruling which her organization was granted as an Ex Parte Application for Temporary Restraining Order (TRO), Interim Relief [PDF Case No: CV 16-00862 RGK (JCx)] that ICANN should hold off from delegating the .AFRICA top-level domain (TLD) to the competing application sponsored by the AUC - ZA Central Registry (ZACR).

Since then, the case has been remanded from Federal court due to lack of jurisdiction. The Judge stated that if DCA ultimately prevails in this action, the gTLD can be re-delegated. The case will be set in a jury trial in 2019 Ten years later after the legal dispute started, the journey of .africa has gone through literally three courts in California, and a number of Judges had ruled in favor and also contrary to the case. Therefore, despite the multiple precedential wins in her battle over the .Africa Domain, unfortunately, the final outcome did not favor her organization. Bekele lost the US court battle for .Africa in 2021 when the Appeals court affirmed the lower court's decision that stopped her case from moving forward to a Jury trial without the merits being heard.
