= Sun protection =

Sun protection refers to:

- Sunscreen
- Sun protective clothing
- Car window sun protection glazing
