= Bekele Geleta =

Bekele Geleta was the Secretary General of the International Federation of Red Cross and Red Crescent Societies between 2008 and 2014. Previously he served as Secretary General to the Ethiopian Red Cross Society (1984-1988), Head of Africa Department (1995-2003) and Head of the South East Asia Regional Delegation (2004-2007). In 2007 he was appointed General Manager of International Operations for the Canadian Red Cross.

On 3 August 2018, Bekele was promoted to the new Government Privatisation Advisory Council to advise Prime Minister Abiy Ahmed concerning his new economic reforms.
