= Move United Junior Nationals =

- Status: Active
- Genre: Youth parasports
- Date: Varying
- Frequency: Annual
- Country: United States
- Inaugurated: 1984
- Most recent: 2019
- Organiser: Move United
- Website: https://juniornationals.adaptivesportsusa.org

The Move United Junior Nationals (formerly the National Junior Disability Championships and the Adaptive Sports USA Junior Nationals) is an annual multi-sport event organized by Move United (formerly Adaptive Sports USA) for junior athletes between the ages of 6 and 22 who have disabilities, with sports including para-athletics.

Several Paralympic athletes started out as competitors at the NJDC.

The 2019 Junior Nationals were hosted from July 14–19, by Eden Prairie, Minnesota, at the Eden Prairie High School campus. The 2020 event was to be hosted in Denver, Colorado but was cancelled and deferred to 2021 due to the COVID-19 pandemic.

== Events ==
The event was founded in 1984 by Wheelchair & Ambulatory Sports, USA and was first held in July 1984.

Similar to the Olympic Games, the Junior Nationals are held every year in a different host city in the United States through a bidding process.

== Participant Eligibility Requirements ==
All participating athletes must be at least 23 years or younger to participate. In 2020 the games were canceled and deferred to 2021 due to the COVID-19 pandemic. When the Junior Nationals returned the following year 2021 the decision was made to allow athletes, 23 years of age that would have aged out of Junior Nationals in 2020 to compete.

Athletes must have a physical, visual, or intellectual impairment that is classifiable under the International Paralympic Committee’s (IPC) Classification System.

Athletes must also achieve required qualifying standards prior to the Junior Nationals registration deadline.

== Qualifying Events ==
List of Move United Sanctioned Competition, an NGB or High School Athletic Association sanctioned event that qualifies for the Junior Nationals that are held throughout the United States of America.

March

- Baltimore Para Classic presented by EY
- Tri-State Regional Swim Meet

April

- Texas Regional Games
- GUMBO North
- Lone Star Para Invitational
- Palmetto Games

May

- Challenge Games
- Dairyland Games
- Desert Challenge Games
- Dixie Games
- Gateway Games
- Great Lakes Games
- IM ABLE Foundation’s Got the Nerve?
- Lone Star Para Invitational
- Russ Harvey Memorial Archery Tournament
- Thunder In the Valley Games

June

- 5280 Challenge
- Angle City Games
- Adaptive Sports New England Track Meet
- Bennett Blazers Invitational
- UCO Endeavor Games
- Beehive Games
- Gopher State Games
- KC Ultimate Games
- Peachtree Paragames
- Pine Cone Classic
- Southeastern Regional Wheelchair Games
- Sportable River City Slam
- Turnstone Endeavor Games
- Tri-State Wheelchair & Ambulatory Games
- University of Michigan Adaptive Track & Field Meet

August

- Adaptive Sports New England Track Meet
- Chicago Para-Archery Championship
- JTCC College Park Championships

September

- GLASA USTA Tennis Tournament

October

- GUMBO State Governor's Games

== Past host cities ==
Edition	Year	Location city / county / state	Venues	Host
1st	1984	Dover, Delaware		
2nd	1985	Fishersville, Virginia		
3rd	1986	Valley Forge, Pennsylvania		
4th	1987	Lawrenceville, New Jersey	Rider College	Children's Specialized Hospital
5th	1988	Johnson City, Tennessee	East Tennessee State University	
6th	1989	Cupertino, California	De Anza College	
7th	1990	Ft. Collins, Colorado	Colorado State University	
8th	1991	Princeton, New Jersey	Princeton University	Children's Specialized Hospital
9th	1992	Orlando, Florida	Walt Disney World	
10th	1993	Columbus, Ohio	Ohio State University	
11th	1994	Edmond, Oklahoma	University of Central Oklahoma	
12th	1995	Ft. Collins, Colorado	Colorado State University	
13th	1996	Birmingham, Alabama	Samford University	Lakeshore Foundation
14th	1997	Mesa, Arizona	Mesa High School	
15th	1998	Bellevue, Washington		
16th	1999	Albuquerque, New Mexico		
17th	2000	San Jose, California	San Jose State University	City of San Jose
18th	2001	Piscataway, New Jersey	Rutgers University	Children's Specialized Hospital
19th	2002	New London, Connecticut	Connecticut College	
20th	2003	New London, Connecticut	Connecticut College	
21st	2004	Mesa, Arizona	**Mountain View High School	
22nd	2005	Tampa, Florida	New Tampa YMCA; University of South Florida	Shriners Hospital, Tampa
23rd	2006	Tampa, Florida	Freedom High School; New Tampa YMCA	Shriners Hospital, Tampa
24th	2007	Spokane, Washington	Spokane Area	Spokane Adaptive Sports
25th	2008	Piscataway, New Jersey	Rutgers University	Children's Specialized Hospital
26th	2009	St. Louis, Missouri	St. Louis Area	DASA - Disability Athlete Sports Association
27th	2010	Deerfield and Lake Forest, Illinois	Deerfield High School; Hyatt Deerfield; Lake Forest High School	Great Lakes Adaptive Sports Association
28th	2011	Saginaw, Michigan	Saginaw State University	Tri-State Wheelchair Athletic Association
29th	2012	Mesa, Arizona	Mesa Community College	Arizona Disabled Sports
30th	2013	Rochester, Minnesota	Century High School; Rochester Recreation Center; UCR Regional Sports Center	Rochester Amateur Sports Commission
31st	2014	Ames, Iowa	Cyclone Sports Complex; Gateway Hotel and Conference Center; Iowa State University	Adaptive Sports Iowa; Iowa State University; Ames Convention and Visitors Bureau
32nd	2015	Union County, New Jersey	Union County, NJ Park System; Renaissance Woodbridge Hotel - Iselin, NJ	Children's Miracle Network Hospitals at Children's Specialized Hospital; Tri-State Wheelchair and Amputee Athletics (TSWAA)
33rd	2016	Middleton, Wisconsin	Baumann Outdoor Pool complex Madison Marriott West; Middleton High School; Middleton Parks System	Adaptive Sports USA; Madison Area Sports Commission; Middleton Tourism Commission
34th	2017	Middleton, Wisconsin	Baumann Outdoor Pool complex Madison Marriott West; Middleton High School; Middleton Parks System	Adaptive Sports USA; Madison Area Sports Commission; Middleton Tourism Commission
35th	2018	Fort Wayne, Indiana		Turnstone
36th	2019	Eden Prairie, Minnesota	Eden Prairie High School	
37th	2021	Denver, Colorado	Delta Hotels by Marriott Denver Thornton; Horizon High School; Mountain Range High School; North Stadium; Trail Winds Park and Recreation Center; Veterans Memorial Aquatic Center; Children's Museum of Denver Marsico Campus	
38th	2022	Metro Denver, Colorado	Denver Marriott Westminster; Mountain Range High School; North Stadium; Trail Winds Park and Recreation Center; Veterans Memorial Aquatic Center	
39th	2023	Hoover, Alabama	Birmingham CrossPlex; Finley Center; Hoover Met Stadium Lakeshore Foundation Campus; Oak Mountain State Park; Spain Park High School	City of Hoover; Greater Birmingham Convention & Vister Bureau; Lakeshore Foundation
40th	2024	Hoover, Alabama	Birmingham CrossPlex; Finley Center; Hoover Met Stadium Lakeshore Foundation Campus; Oak Mountain State Park; Spain Park High School	City of Hoover; Greater Birmingham Convention & Vister Bureau; Lakeshore Foundation
