= Judith Clurman =

Judith Clurman is an American conductor and educator. She is the musical director for Essential Voices USA and The Singing Christmas Tree Float in the Macy's Thanksgiving Day Parade (NBC). She teaches voice and ensemble voice at The Manhattan School of Music and edits two choral series for Hal Leonard Music. She is a member of ASCAP, ASCAP's Special Classification Committee, and the National Academy of Television Arts and Sciences.

== Personal history ==
Born Judith Sue Clurman, in Brooklyn, New York, she is the daughter of Herman Clurman and Gloria Alice Glick Clurman. She has a sister, Ann Deborah. She grew up in Hicksville, Long Island, and attended the public schools there. Judith was originally trained as a pianist and vocalist, and sang in operatic, concert, and oratorio performances before concentrating on conducting. She received her Bachelors and Master's degrees in voice from The Juilliard School. She also studied at Oberlin College, the Aspen Music Festival, and the Temple University Ambler Music Institute and Festival. She studied conducting with Jorge Mester and Richard Westenburg, and furthered her studies in England, with Sir David Willcocks.

Judith is married to Bruce Leonard Ruben. Their son, Ari Solomon Ruben, is married to Alexandra Ross Ruben. She is the grandmother to Penelope Freida Ruben.

== Professional history ==
Clurman made her conducting debut with her New York Concert Singers, a professional chorus, on March 23, 1988, at Merkin Concert Hall, in New York City. Her group appeared numerous times at Merkin Hall, on Carnegie Hall's subscription series, the 92nd Street YMCA, and at Lincoln Center, including an appearance on a “Live from Lincoln Center“ PBS Broadcast. The ensemble's educational program, Project Youth Chorus, provided singing opportunities for students from the five boroughs of New York's public and private schools. The chorus was the recipient of the first ASCAP-Chorus American Award for Adventuresome Programming of Contemporary Music.

Clurman has worked with many of the finest symphonies, including the New York Philharmonic, the Boston Symphony Orchestra, the Orchestra of St Luke's, the American Composer's Orchestra, and the Mostly Mozart Festival Orchestra, and the Omaha Symphony. She enjoyed collaborating with the world's finest musicians, including James Conlon, Dennis Russell Davies, Charles Dutoit, Christoph Eschenbach, James Levine, Sir Charles Mackerras, Sir Roger Norrington, Seiji Ozawa, Trevor Pinnock, Julius Rudel, Leonard Slatkin, and Thomas Wilkins. She often conducted at Lincoln Center Out of Doors Festival, and created the Lincoln Center Holiday Tree Lighting, for which she commissioned new holiday music, collaborated with the world's finest classical and jazz artists, and invited students to sing and perform in choral ensembles with the Sesame Street Muppets.

Highlights of Clurman's career include conducting performances at the Mozarteum Grosser Saal in Salzburg and the Mozart Requiem at Carnegie Hall with the Juilliard Orchestra and Juilliard Choral Singers in a performance commemorating the Fifth anniversary of 9/11. She conducted the Concerts for Peace at the Cathedral Church of St. John the Divine in NYC, the nationally televised “Music of the Spirit” (NBC and PBS) with her New York Concert Singers and the St Luke's Chamber Ensemble, and Howard Shore's choral music for the SONY movie The Song of Names. She was featured on the nationally televised Macy's 4th of July Fireworks Spectacular (NBC) on July 4, 2014, with the Diva Jazz Orchestra (their recording of national anthem, with Idina Menzel, has been catalogued at Fort McHenry Museum in Baltimore, MD). In addition, she conducted the complete Mozart canons for Lincoln Center's Mozart Bicentennial, which included the world premiere and US premieres of the versions of the music that were found in Constanze Mozart's edition of the music (K. 233a, K. 231, K. 234), the US premiere of the original edition of Rossini's Petite messe solennelle; the world premiere of Leonard Bernstein's arrangement of George Gershwin's Rhapsody in Blue, the NY Premiere of Bernstein's Missa Brevis, and the US premieres of music by Philip Glass, Arvo Pärt, and Ned Rorem. She has commissioned and conducted new works by over seventy composers, including music by Tzvi Avni, Milton Babbitt, Robert Beaser, William Bolcom, Jason Robert Brown, David Chase, William Cutter, Marvin Hamlisch, Jake Heggie, Jennifer Higdon, Laura Karpman, Libby Larsen, Tania Léon, Andrew Lippa, David Ludwig, Nico Muhly, Stephen Paulus, Shulamit Ran, Christopher Rouse, Augusta Read Thomas, Joshua Schmidt, Howard Shore, Mark Sirett, and Stephen Schwartz.

Clurman served as an Artist in Residence for National Public Radio for one month in 2011, presenting recordings of fifteen composers, from the cycle “Sing Out Mr. President.” She has received two Emmy nominations, one for music direction and composition as Associate Music Director for Sesame Street (Season 39), and one for outstanding original song (Macy's Thanksgiving Day Parade – “The Holidays Are Here”). She conducted Tania Léon's music on the Grammy and Latin Grammy nominated CD, In Motion. Her own music and arrangements are published by G. Schirmer, Hal Leonard, and Schott, and have been performed by the Boston, Detroit, Houston, New Jersey, National, San Francisco, and Toronto Symphonies, and the New York Pops.

Clurman's work on the Decca, Delos, New World, Acis, Sono Luminus, Symphony Space, and Albany labels includes: May You Heal, (music of comfort during the COVID-19 pandemic), Words Matter (Stephen Schwartz and Shawn Crouch), Winter Harmonies, Appalachian Stories (with Tessa Lark, violin), Holiday Harmonies (with Jamie Barton), Cherished Moments: Songs of the Jewish Spirit, Divine Grandeur, The Mask, A Season's Promise, The Song of Names (Movie Soundtrack), America At Heart (with Brian Stokes Mitchell and Randy Graff), Rejoice: Honoring the Jewish Spirit, Cradle Hymn, A Palace Among Ruins (Howard Shore), Celebrating the American Spirit (With Ron Raines and Kelli O’Hara), The Music in My Mind (Marvin Hamlisch and Ruppert Holmes), Stephen Sondheim's 75th Birthday, Works of Amy Beach (Cabildo), and In Motion (Tania Léon).

As an educator, Clurman was Director of Choral Activities at The Juilliard School from 1989-2007 where she created and conducted the Juilliard Choral Union and taught conducting and vocal chamber music. She has served as a visiting artist/teacher at University of Cambridge, Curtis Institute of Music, Harvard University, Princeton University, the Janacek Academy, the Hebrew Union College School of Sacred Music, and at Israel's Zimriya Festival at Hebrew University. She served as a vocal specialist at the National Endowment for the Arts/Columbia University Institute of Classical Music, and taught for the Leonard Bernstein Artful Learning program.
