= Wheelchair rugby at the 2000 Summer Paralympics – Rosters =

This is a list of the players who were on the rosters of the given teams that participated in the 2000 Summer Paralympics for wheelchair rugby.

== Teams ==
=== United States ===
Name
William Renje
Clifton Chunn
Wayne Romero
Daniel Guillou
Troy McGuirk
Rick Draney
Dean MacCabe
Stephen Pate
Norman Lyduch
Bryan Kirkland
Ralph Shadowebs
Eddie Crouch

=== Australia ===
Name
Bryce Alman
Patrick Ryan
Garry Croker
Steve Porter
Tom Kennedy
Brad Dubberley
Clifford Clarke
Brett Boylan
Peter Harding
Craig Parsons
Nazim Erdem
George Hucks

=== Sweden ===
Name
Jesper Nilsson
Tomas Engblom
Thomas Eriksson
Haci Sak
Magnus Olers
Jan-Owe Mattsson
Loa Rissmar
Ulf Josefsson
Pelle Kulle
Andreas Lundgren
Magnus Gunnarsson
Kristofer Lindberg

=== Switzerland ===
Name
Michael Roethlisberger
Herbert Winistoerfer
Andres Schmid
Savo Pejic
Daniel Joggi
Luzius Diener
Thomas Huber
Hubert Bamert
Christian Buess
Roger Suter

=== New Zealand ===
Name
Paul Leefe
Bill Oughton
Stephen Guthrie
Tony Howe
Timothy Johnson
Geremy Tinker
Justin Muschamp
Sholto Taylor
Gary McMurray
Curtis Palmer
Grant Sharman

=== Canada ===
Name
Kirby Kranabetter
Daryl Stubel
David Willsie
Patrice Simard
Dany Belanger
Mike Bacon
Allan Semenuik
Ian Chan
Garett Hickling
Christopher Daw
Martin Larocque
Daniel Paradis

=== Great Britain ===
Name
Troye Collins
Graham Kamaly-Asl
Rob Tarr
Keith Jones
Mike Spence
Ian Prescott
Darren Ransome
Bob O'Shea
Alan Ash
Simon Chambers
Tony Stackhouse
Paul Shaw

=== Germany ===
Name
Christian Michael Humpenoeder
Hani Al Bawardi
Juergen Schmid
Boris Grundl
Dirk Wieschendorf
Hans Bach
Peter Schreiner
Wolfgang Mayer
Bernd Janssen
Benjamin Putsch
Herbert Broos
Haiko te Neues

Source: Paralympic.org
