= Wheelchair rugby at the 2004 Summer Paralympics – Rosters =

This is a list of the players who were on the rosters of the given teams that participated in the 2004 Summer Paralympics for wheelchair rugby.

== Teams ==
=== United States ===
Name
Lynn Nelson
Clifton Chunn
Wayne Romero
Brent Poppen
Will Groulx
Scott Hogsett
Bob Lujano
Andy Cohn
Norman Lyduch
Bryan Kirkland
Mark Zupan
Sam Gloor

=== New Zealand ===
Name
Dan Buckingham
Stephen Guthrie
Bill Oughton
Timothy Johnson
Geremy Tinker
Jai Waite
Sholto Taylor
Gary McMurray
Curtis Palmer

=== Australia ===
Name
Bryce Alman
Patrick Ryan
Scott Vitale
Ryan Scott
Steve Porter
Grant Boxall
Brad Dubberley
Brett Boylan
Kevin Kersnovske
Ryley Batt
Nazim Erdem
George Hucks

=== Japan ===
Name
Hiroyuki Misaka
Manabu Tamura
Yoshito Sato
Shinichi Nakazato
Masanao Kawamura
Satoshi Ito
Takuo Murohashi
Koichi Ogino
Shinichi Shimakawa
Masahiro Fukui
Kenichi Mori
Yoshinobu Takahashi

=== Great Britain ===
Name
Troye Collins
Justin Frishberg
Andy Barrow
Alan Ash
Rob Tarr
Jason Robert
Ross Morrison
Paul Shaw
Tony Stackhouse
Steve Palmer
Jonathan Coggan
Bob O'Shea

=== Canada ===
Name
Allan Cartrand
Fabien Lavoie
Jared Funk
David Willsie
Patrice Simard
Mike Bacon
Michael Whitehead
Daniel Paradis
Raymond Lizotte
Garett Hickling
Ian Chan
Allan Semenuik

=== Belgium ===
Name
Christophe Hindricq
Ludwig Budeners
Ronny Verhaegen
Lars Mertens
Bob Vanacker
Koen Delen
Peter Genyn
Guy Michem

=== Germany ===
Name
Nacer Menezla
Juergen Schmid
Oliver Johannes Picht
Dirk Wieschendorf
Hans Bach
Peter Schreiner
Wolfgang Mayer
Bernd Janssen
Andre Leonhard
Christoph Werner
Joerg Holzem

Source: Paralympic.org
