= Wheelchair rugby at the 1996 Summer Paralympics – Rosters =

This is a list of the players who were on the rosters of the given teams that participated in the 1996 Summer Paralympics for wheelchair rugby.

== Teams ==
=== United States ===
Name
William Renje
Clifton Chunn
Bradley Updegrove
David Ceruti
Joseph Soares
David Gould
Charles Crouch

=== New Zealand ===
Name
Paul Leefe
Stephen Guthrie
Geremy Tinker
Robert Dickie
Sholto Taylor
Gary McMurray
Curtis Palmer
Grant Sharman

=== Canada ===
Name
Kirby Kranabetter
Raymond Lizotte
Daryl Stubel
David Tweed
Brian McPhate
Dany Belanger
Allan Semeniuk
Garett Hickling

=== Great Britain ===
Name
Roy Humphreys
Alan Ash
Paul Jenkins
Jeffery Davey
Mark Eccleston
Rob Tarr
Darren Ransome
Keith Jones

=== Sweden ===
Name
Thomas Eriksson
Tomas Engblom
Jesper Nilsson
Jan-Owe Mattsson
Jimmy Ottosson
Andreas Lundgren
Peter Andersson
Ulf Josefsson

=== Australia ===
Name
Garry Croker
Peter Lock
David Jacka
Rodney Hamilton
Brett Boylan
Andrew Greenaway
Baden Whitehead
Steve Porter

Source: Paralympic.org
