= List of New Zealand Paralympians =

The following Paralympians have represented New Zealand at the Summer and Winter Paralympic Games since the nation's debut at the 1968 Summer Paralympics. Athletes are listed according to their official Paralympic number, with a total of 237 as of the 2026 Winter Paralympics. This number is bestowed once a Paralympian has competed at their first Paralympic Games.

== List ==
#	Name	Year of debut	Sport	PNZ
1	Norman Brown	1968	Para archery, Para swimming, Para table tennis	
2	Len Campbell	1968	Para athletics, Wheelchair fencing	
3	Leo Close	1968	Para athletics	
4	Graham Condon	1968	Para athletics, Para swimming	
5	Rex Fattorini	1968	Para athletics, Para powerlifting	
6	Bill Flood	1968	Para archery, Para athletics, Para bowls, Para table tennis, Wheelchair fencing	
7	Bill Lean	1968	Para archery, Para athletics, Para powerlifting, Para table tennis	
8	Graeme Marett	1968	Para archery, Para athletics, Para swimming, Para table tennis	
9	Not Allocated (Note: There is no NZ Paralympian #9. Doug MacDonald was originally believed to have attended the 1968 games, but it was later confirmed that although selected he did not attend.)			
10	Reuben Ngata	1968	Para athletics, Para powerlifting, Para table tennis	
11	Bill Plessius	1968	Para athletics	
12	Philip Read	1968	Para table tennis	
13	Eve Rimmer	1968	Para archery, Para athletics, Para swimming	
14	Jim Savage	1968	Para archery, Para athletics, Para table tennis	
15	John Stott	1968	Para swimming, Para table tennis	
16	Rodney Wright	1968	Para archery, Para swimming	
17	Neroli Fairhall	1972	Para archery, Para athletics	
18	Keith McCormick	1972	Para athletics, Para swimming	
19	Dennis Miller	1972	Para athletics, Para table tennis	
20	Tina Morgan	1972	Para athletics, Para swimming	
21	Chris Nicholls	1972	Para archery, Para athletics, Para swimming	
22	Paul Chambers	1976	Para athletics, Para swimming	
23	Fred Creba	1976	Para athletics, Para powerlifting	
24	Ross Hynds	1976	Para athletics, Para archery	
25	Brian McNicholl	1976	Para athletics, Para powerlifting	
26	Doug Moore	1976	Para athletics, Para table tennis	
27	Peter Baddeley	1980	Para alpine skiing	
28	Edward Nichols	1980	Para alpine skiing	
29	Craig Philip	1980	Para alpine skiing	
30	Greg Cochrane	1980	Para athletics, Para swimming	
31	John Eden	1980	Para athletics, Para swimming	
32	Kaye Firth	1980	Para athletics, Para swimming	
33	Brian Froggatt	1980	Para athletics, Para powerlifting	
34	Latoa Halatau	1980	Para athletics	
35	Patricia Hill	1980	Para athletics	
36	Chris Moran	1980	Para athletics, Para swimming	
37	Ken Raymond	1980	Para archery, Para athletics	
38	Tewai Skipwith-Halatau	1980	Para athletics	
39	Dave Tarrant	1980	Shooting Para sport	
40	Edwyn (Ed) Bickerstaff	1984	Para alpine skiing	
41	Denis Butler	1984	Para alpine skiing	
42	Martin Clark	1984	Para alpine skiing, Para sailing	
43	Patricia (Trish) Craig	1984	Para alpine skiing	
44	Mark Edwards	1984	Para alpine skiing	
45	Viv Gapes (Martin)	1984	Para alpine skiing	
46	Christopher Orr	1984	Para alpine skiing	
47	Denise Cook	1984	Para athletics	
48	Robert Courtney	1984	Para athletics	
49	Roly Crichton	1984	Para swimming	
50	Michelle Hadfield	1984	Para athletics	
51	Morice Hennessy	1984	Para athletics	
52	Michael O'Callaghan	1984	Para athletics	
53	Alison Smith	1984	Shooting Para sport	
54	Colin Willis	1984	Shooting Para sport	
55	Patrick Cooper	1988	Para alpine skiing	
56	Lorraine Te Punga	1988	Para alpine skiing	
57	Grant Buchanan	1988	Para athletics	
58	Janette Cordery	1988	Para athletics, Para swimming	
59	John Davies	1988	Para bowls	
60	Brent Gibson	1988	Para swimming	
61	Peter Horne	1988	Para bowls	
62	Lesli Mancktelow	1988	Para athletics	
63	Stelios Meimaris	1988	Para athletics	
64	David Mills	1988	Para athletics	
65	Yvonne Mills	1988	Para athletics	
66	Stuart Minifie	1988	Para athletics	
67	Tui Rupe	1988	Para athletics	
68	Brad Vear	1988	Para athletics	
69	Chris Adamson	1992	Para alpine skiing	
70	Stuart Graham	1992	Para alpine skiing	
71	Kevin O'Sullivan	1992	Para alpine skiing	
72	Devin Shanks	1992	Para alpine skiing	
73	Mark Weeks	1992	Para alpine skiing	
74	Glenn Barnes	1992	Wheelchair tennis	
75	Aaron Bidois	1992	Para swimming	
76	Evan Clulee	1992	Para athletics	
77	Gavin Foulsham	1992	Para athletics	
78	Denise Gow	1992	Para athletics	
79	Belinda Keogan (née Honey)	1992	Para swimming	
80	David (Dave) MacCalman	1992	Para athletics	
81	Jenny Newstead	1992	Para swimming	
82	Cristeen Smith	1992	Para athletics	
83	John Sorensen	1992	Wheelchair tennis	
84	Kevin Aleksich	1994	Para alpine skiing	
85	Matthew Butson	1994	Para alpine skiing	
86	Joanne Duffy	1994	Para alpine skiing	
87	Hayden Brown	1996	Para swimming	
88	Rewiti Cameron	1996	Para swimming	
89	Jacque Courtier	1996	Wheelchair tennis	
90	Jayne Craike	1996	Para equestrian	
91	Rob Creagh	1996	Wheelchair rugby	
92	Henk Dijkstra	1996	Boccia	
93	John Dowall	1996	Para athletics	
94	Jason Griffiths	1996	Para swimming	
95	Steve Guthrie (Note: Given name is shown as Steve in sources from PNZ, but as Stephen in source from IPC.)	1996	Wheelchair rugby	
96	Duane Kale	1996	Para swimming	
97	Paul Leefe	1996	Wheelchair rugby	
98	Carey Lineham	1996	Para athletics	
99	Ben Lucas	1996	Para athletics	
100	Peter Martin	1996	Para athletics	
101	Mervyn Mathews	1996	Para bowls	
102	Andrew May	1996	Para sailing	
103	Gary McMurray	1996	Wheelchair rugby	
104	Jeferey Muralt	1996	Para athletics	
105	Curtis Palmer	1996	Wheelchair rugby	
106	Cameron Scott	1996	Para sailing	
107	Grant Sharman	1996	Wheelchair rugby	
108	Thomas Simeon	1996	Boccia	
109	Derek Stewart	1996	Para sailing	
110	Marilyn Stratford	1996	Wheelchair tennis	
111	Sholto Taylor	1996	Wheelchair rugby	
112	Geremy Tinker	1996	Wheelchair rugby	
113	Chris Wornall	1996	Para sailing	
114	Rachael Battersby	1998	Para alpine skiing	
115	Steven Bayley	1998	Para alpine skiing	
116	Sue Gardiner	1998	Para alpine skiing	
117	Dean Booth	2000	Para swimming	
118	Tanya Bradley	2000	Para athletics	
119	Paul Britnell	2000	Wheelchair tennis	
120	David Collie	2000	Para athletics	
121	Phil Edwards	2000	Para sailing	
122	Wayne Fleming	2000	Wheelchair tennis	
123	Ross Flood	2000	Boccia	
124	Mark Inglis	2000	Para cycling	
125	Paul Jesson	2000	Para cycling	
126	Tim Johnson	2000	Wheelchair rugby	
127	Paul Van Den Munckhof	2000	Boccia	
128	Justin Muschamp	2000	Wheelchair rugby	
129	Bill Oughton	2000	Wheelchair rugby	
130	Hadleigh Pierson	2000	Para swimming	
131	Gillian Pollock	2000	Para swimming	
132	Tim Prendergast	2000	Para athletics	
133	Garth Reynolds	2000	Para sailing	
134	Stacey Roche	2000	Boccia	
135	Matthew Slade	2000	Para athletics	
136	George Taamaru	2000	Para powerlifting	
137	Sean Tretheway	2000	Para swimming	
138	Gary Williams	2000	Boccia	
139	Chris Wood	2000	Para sailing	
140	Tracey Wright	2000	Para powerlifting	
141	Willie Beattie	2004	Para athletics	
142	Dan Buckingham	2004	Wheelchair rugby	
143	Terry Faleva’ai	2004	Para athletics	
144	Theresa Griffin	2004	Para swimming	
145	Kate Horan	2004	Para athletics, Para cycling	
146	Greig Jackson	2004	Boccia	
147	Miriam Sheppard	2004	Para swimming	
148	Michael Johnson	2004	Shooting Para sport	
149	Jeremy Morriss	2004	Boccia	
150	Tiffiney Perry	2004	Wheelchair tennis	
151	Sarah Powell	2004	Para swimming	
152	Liam Sanders	2004	Boccia	
153	Daniel Sharp	2004	Para swimming	
154	Fiona Southorn	2004	Para cycling	
155	Maurice Toon	2004	Boccia	
156	Jai Waite	2004	Wheelchair rugby	
157	Anthony Field	2006	Para alpine skiing	
158	Adam Hall	2006	Para alpine skiing	
159	Kerri Bonner	2008	Boccia	
160	Annemarie Donaldson	2008	Para cycling	
161	Annaliisa Farrell	2008	Para cycling	
162	Jessica Gillan (née Hamill)	2008	Para athletics	
163	David Klinkhamer	2008	Wheelchair rugby	
164	Cameron Leslie	2008	Para swimming	
165	Jayne Parsons	2008	Para cycling	
166	Sophie Pascoe	2008	Para swimming	
167	Amanda Slade	2008	Boccia	
168	Paula Tesoriero	2008	Para cycling	
169	Adam Wakeford	2008	Wheelchair rugby	
170	Peter Williams	2010	Para alpine skiing	
171	Jan Apel	2012	Para sailing	
172	Timothy Dempsey	2012	Para swimming	
173	Rebecca Dubber	2012	Para swimming	
174	Mary Fisher	2012	Para swimming	
175	Paul Francis	2012	Para sailing	
176	Phillipa Gray	2012	Para cycling	
177	Anthea Dixon (née Gunner)	2012	Para equestrian	
178	Daniel Holt	2012	Para swimming	
179	Nikita Howarth	2012	Para swimming	
180	Aine Maeve Kelly-Costello	2012	Para swimming	
181	Danny McBride	2012	Para rowing	
182	Susan Reid	2012	Para cycling	
183	Holly Robinson	2012	Para athletics	
184	Christopher Ross	2012	Para cycling	
185	Nathan Smith	2012	Para cycling	
186	Rachel Hughes (née Stock)	2012	Para equestrian	
187	Laura Thompson	2012	Para cycling	
188	Corey Peters	2014	Para alpine skiing	
189	Carl Murphy	2014	Para snowboard	
190	Amanda Cameron	2016	Para cycling	
191	Richard Dodson	2016	Para sailing	
192	Caitlin Dore	2016	Para athletics	
193	Jason Eales	2016	Shooting Para sport	
194	Emma Foy	2016	Para cycling	
195	Anna Grimaldi	2016	Para athletics	
196	Stephen Hills	2016	Para cycling	
197	Liam Malone	2016	Para athletics	
198	Scott Martlew	2016	Para canoe	
199	Hamish McLean	2016	Para swimming	
200	Rory McSweeney	2016	Para athletics	
201	Tupou Neiufi	2016	Para swimming	
202	Jacob Phillips	2016	Para athletics	
203	Byron Raubenheimer	2016	Para cycling	
204	Greg Reid	2016	Shooting Para sport	
205	Jesse Reynolds	2016	Para swimming	
206	Chris Sharp	2016	Para sailing	
207	Fraser Sharp	2016	Para cycling	
208	William Stedman	2016	Para athletics	
209	Hannah van Kampen	2016	Para cycling	
210	Lisa Adams	2020	Para athletics	
211	Danielle Aitchison	2020	Para athletics	
212	Hayden Barton-Cootes	2020	Wheelchair rugby	
213	Sarah Ellington	2020	Para cycling	
214	Cody Everson	2020	Wheelchair rugby	
215	Corbin Hart	2020	Para canoe	
216	Robert Hewitt	2020	Wheelchair rugby	
217	Barney Koneferenisi	2020	Wheelchair rugby	
218	Tainafi Lefono	2020	Wheelchair rugby	
219	Gareth Lynch	2020	Wheelchair rugby	
220	Eltje Malzbender	2020	Para cycling	
221	Rory Mead	2020	Para cycling	
222	Nicole Murray	2020	Para cycling	
223	Gavin Rolton	2020	Wheelchair rugby	
224	Anna Steven	2020	Para athletics	
225	Anna Taylor	2020	Para cycling	
226	Mike Todd	2020	Wheelchair rugby	
227	Ben Tuimaseve	2020	Para athletics	
228	Aaron Ewen	2022	Para alpine skiing	
229	Devon Briggs	2024	Para cycling	
230	Matthew Britz	2024	Para table tennis	
231	Peter Cowan	2024	Para canoe	
232	Wojtek Czyz	2024	Para badminton	
233	Louise Duncan	2024	Para equestrian	
234	Mitch Joynt	2024	Para athletics	
235	Lili-Fox Mason	2024	Para swimming	
236	Neelam O'Neill	2024	Shooting Para sport	
237	Gabriella Smith	2024	Para swimming	
238	Joshua Willmer	2024	Para swimming	

== Milestones ==
- In Atlanta 1996, Paralympian #96 Duane Kale won 4 gold medals, a silver and a bronze in a single Paralympic Games - the best result of any New Zealander at a single Paralympics or Olympics.
- Paralympian #166 Dame Sophie Pascoe has won 19 Paralympic medals over four Paralympic Games from Beijing 2008 - Tokyo 2020 - making her the most decorated New Zealander at the Paralympics or Olympics.
- New Zealand's first Paralympic medals were won by Paralympian #13 Eve Rimmer. Eve competed in Para athletics and Para swimming, picking up 1 gold, two silvers and a bronze. She was the only medallist in the first NZ Paralympic Team at Tel Aviv 1968 and also the only woman.
- At London 2012, at the age of 13, Paralympian #179 Nikita Howarth became New Zealand's youngest ever Paralympian.
- At Innsbruck 1984, Paralympian #45 Viv Gapes (née Martin) won 3 medals and became New Zealand's first ever Winter Paralympic medallist.

== See also ==
- New Zealand at the Paralympics
