= 2013 Wheelchair Rugby Tri-Nations =

Wheelchair Rugby Tri-Nations
- 2013

Tournament information
- Sport: Wheelchair rugby
- Location: St Mary’s Cathedral Square, Sydney
- Dates: 18 September–20 September 2013
- Teams: 3

Final positions
- Champions: United States
- Runner-up: Australia

Tournament statistics
- Matches played: 8
- Points scored: 839 (104.88 per match)

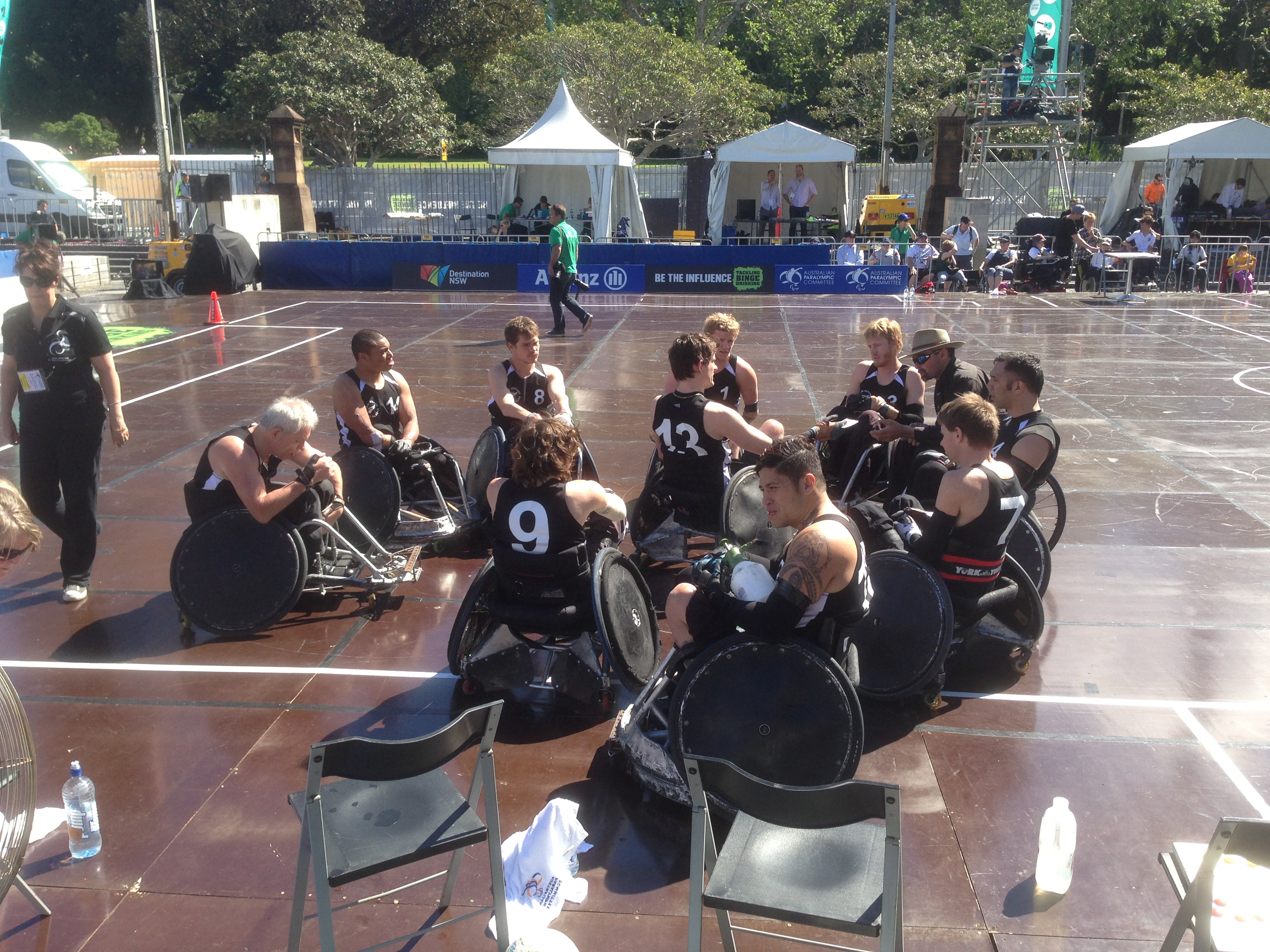
Wheelchair Rugby Tri-Nation series- New Zealand Wheel Blacks

The Be the Influence Wheelchair Rugby Tri-Nations is a wheelchair rugby tournament that took place on 18–20 September 2013 at St Mary’s Cathedral Square, Sydney. Three nations competed in the tournament, they were the United States of America, New Zealand and Australia. The USA won the tournament by defeating Australia in the final.

== Tournament ==
=== Preliminary round ===
Team	Pld	W	D	L	G	GA	GD	Pts
United States (USA)	4	3	0	1	229	183	+46	6
Australia (AUS)	4	3	0	1	226	198	+28	6
New Zealand (NZL)	4	0	0	4	165	239	-74	0

18 September 2013
10:45

United States	56 – 43	Australia
Chuck Aoki – 16; Joe Delagrave – 14; Derrick Helton – 10; Josh Wheeler – 7 Chuck Melton – 3 Eric Newby – 3 Ernie Churn – 1 Andy Cohn – 1 Eric Chase – 1		Ryley Batt – 22; Chris Bond – 13; Curtis Palmer – 3 Cameron Carr – 1 Josh Hose – 1 Andrew Harrison – 1 Jason Lees – 1 Andrew Harrison – 1

St Mary's Cathedral Square
18 September 2013
17:30

New Zealand	40 – 58	United States
Barney Konerferisi – 15; Dan Buckingham – 12; Cameron Leslie – 7 Clayton Utia – 2 Rob Hewitt – 2 Sholto Taylor – 2		Chuck Aoki – 10; Eric Newby – 10; Joe Delagrave – 9 Derrick Helton – 8 Ernie Chun – 6 Chuck Melton – 5 Andy Cohn – 5 Josh Wheeler – 4 Eric Chase – 1

St Mary's Cathedral Square
18 September 2013
19:30

Australia	62 – 48	New Zealand
Ryley Batt – 28; Chris Bond – 16; Andrew Harrison – 4 Cameron Carr – 3 Jason Lees – 2 Josh Hose – 2 Curtis Palmer – 1		Barney Konerferisi – 24; Dan Buckingham – 10; Cameron Leslie – 8 Sholto Taylor – 3 Rob Hewitt – 3

St Mary's Cathedral Square
19 September 2013
12:30

New Zealand	41 – 57	Australia
Cameron Leslie – 15; Dan Buckingham – 10; Barney Konerferisi – 9		Ryley Batt – 30; Chris Bond – 14; Curtis Palmer – 6

St Mary's Cathedral Square
19 September 2013
17:30

United States	62 – 36	New Zealand

St Mary's Cathedral Square
19 September 2013
19:30

Australia	64 – 53	United States
Ryley Batt – 39; Chris Bond – 25		Chuck Aoki – 27; Derrick Helton – 12; Joe Delagrave – 9 Chuck Melton – 3 Josh Wheeler – 2

St Mary's Cathedral Square

=== Semifinal ===
20 September 2013
12:00

Australia	62 – 45	New Zealand
Ryley Batt – 22; Chris Bond – 22; Palmer – 5 Josh Hose – 4 Andrew Harrison – 4 Cameron Carr – 4 Jason Lees – 1		Sholto Taylor – 11; Dan Buckingham – 11; Barney Konerferisi – 11; Cameron Leslie – 8 Adam Wakeford – 1 Rob Hewitt – 1 Chris Lay – 1

St Mary's Cathedral Square

=== Final ===
20 September 2013
17:00

Australia	54 – 58	United States
Ryley Batt – 40; Chris Bond – 14		Chuck Aoki – 26; Joe Delagrave – 21; Derrick Helton – 5 Chuck Melton – 3 Josh Wheeler – 3

St Mary's Cathedral Square
