= Wheelchair rugby at the Summer Paralympics =

- Governing body: IWRF
- Events: 1 (mixed)

Games
- 1960; 1964; 1968; 1972; 1976; 1980; 1984; 1988; 1992; 1996; 2000; 2004; 2008; 2012; 2016; 2020; 2024
- Note: demonstration sport years indicated in italics
- Medalists

Wheelchair rugby was first contested at the Summer Paralympics as a demonstration sport in 1996. It became an official medal-awarding sport in 2000 and has been competed at every Summer Paralympics since then. Only one event, mixed team, is held.

== Tournaments ==
Year	Host	Gold medal game			Bronze medal game
Year	Host	Gold medalist	Score	Silver medalist	Bronze medalist	Score	Fourth place
1996 details	Atlanta	United States	37 - 30	Canada	New Zealand	46 - 34	Great Britain
2000 details	Sydney	United States	32 - 31	Australia	New Zealand	44 - 32	Canada
2004 details	Athens	New Zealand	31 - 29	Canada	United States	43 - 39	Great Britain
2008 details	Beijing	United States	53 - 44	Australia	Canada	47 - 41	Great Britain
2012 details	London	Australia	66 - 51	Canada	United States	53 - 43	Japan
2016 details	Rio de Janeiro	Australia	59 - 58	United States	Japan	52 - 50	Canada
2020 details	Tokyo	Great Britain	54 - 49	United States	Japan	60 - 52	Australia
2024 details	Paris	Japan	48 - 41	United States	Australia	50 - 48	Great Britain

== Medal table ==
Updated after the 2024 Summer Paralympics

Rank	Nation	Gold	Silver	Bronze	Total
1	United States	3	3	2	8
2	Australia	2	2	1	5
3	Japan	1	0	2	3
3	New Zealand	1	0	2	3
5	Great Britain	1	0	0	1
6	Canada	0	3	1	4
Totals (6 entries)		8	8	8	24

== Participating nations ==
Four nations - United States, Canada, Australia and Great Britain have appeared in every wheelchair rugby Paralympic tournament since its introduction. The 1996 tournament was considered a demonstration event, but unlike the Olympics, medals were awarded and counted in the main medals table.

The final placement for each team in each tournament is shown in the following tables.

=== Participating nations ===
Team	(United States); 1996	(Australia); 2000	(Greece); 2004	(China); 2008	(United Kingdom); 2012	(Brazil); 2016	(Japan); 2020	(France); 2024
Australia	6th	Silver medal	5th	Silver medal	Gold medal	Gold medal	4th	Bronze medal
Belgium	–	–	6th	–	7th	–	–	-
Brazil	–	–	–	–	–	8th	–	-
Canada	Silver medal	4th	Silver medal	Bronze medal	Silver medal	4th	5th	6th
China	–	–	–	8th	–	–	–	-
Denmark	–	–	–	–	–	–	7th	7th
France	–	–	–	–	8th	7th	6th	5th
Germany	–	7th	7th	6th	–	–	–	8th
Great Britain	4th	6th	4th	4th	5th	5th	Gold medal	4th
Japan	–	–	8th	7th	4th	Bronze medal	Bronze medal	Gold medal
New Zealand	Bronze medal	Bronze medal	Gold medal	5th	–	–	8th	-
Sweden	5th	5th	–	–	6th	6th	–	-
Switzerland	–	8th	–	–	–	–	–	-
United States	Gold medal	Gold medal	Bronze medal	Gold medal	Bronze medal	Silver medal	Silver medal	Silver medal

== Complete Results ==
1. https://www.paralympic.org/atlanta-1996/results/wheelchair-rugby
2. https://www.paralympic.org/sydney-2000/results/wheelchair-rugby
3. https://www.paralympic.org/athens-2004/results/wheelchair-rugby
4. https://www.paralympic.org/beijing-2008/results/wheelchair-rugby
5. https://www.paralympic.org/london-2012/results/wheelchair-rugby
6. https://www.paralympic.org/rio-2016/results/wheelchair-rugby
7. https://www.paralympic.org/tokyo-2020/results/wheelchair-rugby

== See also ==
- Rugby at the Summer Olympics
