= Wheelchair rugby at the 2000 Summer Paralympics =

Wheelchair rugby at the XI Paralympic Games
- Paralympic Wheelchair rugby
- Venue: The Dome and Exhibition Complex
- Competitors: 8 teams from 8 nations

Medalists
1st place, gold medalist(s)		United States	United States
2nd place, silver medalist(s)		Australia	Australia
3rd place, bronze medalist(s)		New Zealand	New Zealand

Paralympic symbol (1994-2004)

Wheelchair Rugby at the 2000 Summer Paralympics was officially a mixed sport; however, no women participated. This was the first year that the sport was an official part of the Paralympic program. It had previously been a demonstration sport at the 1996 Paralympics. Eight teams took part in the competition.

== Medal summary ==
Event	Gold	Silver	Bronze
Mixed wheelchair rugby	United States (USA) William Renje; Clifton Chunn; Wayne Romero; Daniel Guillou; Troy McGuirk; Rick Draney; Dean MacCabe; Stephen Pate; Norman Lyduch; Bryan Kirkland; Ralph Shadowens; Eddie Crouch	Australia (AUS) Bryce Alman; Patrick Ryan; Garry Croker; Steve Porter; Tom Kennedy; Brad Dubberley; Clifford Clarke; Brett Boylan; Peter Harding; Craig Parsons; Nazim Erdem; George Hucks	New Zealand (NZL) Paul Leefe; Bill Oughton; Stephen Guthrie; Tony Howe; Timothy Johnson; Geremy Tinker; Justin Muschamp; Sholto Taylor; Gary McMurray; Curtis Palmer; Grant Sharman

== Classification ==
Wheelchair rugby players were given a classification based on their upper body function. A committee gave each athlete a 7-level score ranging from 0.5 to 3.5, with lower scores corresponding to more severe disability. During the game, the total score of all players on the court for a team cannot exceed 8 points. However, for each female player on court, their team gets an extra 0.5 points over the 8 point limit.

== Teams ==
Eight teams took part in this sport. Each team could have up to 12 athletes, but no more than 11 of the team members could be male. Listed below are the eight teams qualified for the Sydney Paralympics.

Qualified teams
United States (USA)
New Zealand (NZL)
Australia (AUS)
Canada (CAN)
Sweden (SWE)
Great Britain (GBR)
Switzerland (SUI)
Germany (GER)

== Tournament ==
=== Competition format ===
The eight teams were divided into two even groups and participated in a single round robin tournament. The top two teams from each group went on to compete for 1st through 4th place, while the last two teams from each group competed for 5th through 8th place.

=== Preliminary Round ===
Group A
Rank	Team	Pld	W	L	PF:PA	Pts	USA	AUS	SWE	SUI
1	United States (USA)	3	3	0	125:83	6	x	29:27	54:29	42:27
2	Australia (AUS)	3	2	1	108:97	5	27:29	x	39:36	42:32
3	Sweden (SWE)	3	1	2	109:128	4	29:54	36:39	x	44:35
4	Switzerland (SUI)	3	0	3	94:128	3	27:42	32:42	35:44	x

Group B
Rank	Team	Pld	W	L	PF:PA	Pts	NZL	CAN	GBR	GER
1	New Zealand (NZL)	3	3	0	131:98	6	x	38:31	46:37	47:30
2	Canada (CAN)	3	2	1	104:103	5	31:38	x	38:33	35:32
3	Great Britain (GBR)	3	1	2	111:122	4	37:46	33:38	x	41:38
4	Germany (GER)	3	0	3	100:123	3	30:47	32:35	38:41	x

Qualified for quarterfinals
Eliminated

Source: Paralympic.org

=== Medal round ===
Semifinals
United States (USA)	40
Canada (CAN)	35
New Zealand (NZL)	39
Australia (AUS)	40

Gold medal match
United States (USA)	32
Australia (AUS)	31
Bronze medal match
Canada (CAN)	32
New Zealand (NZL)	44

IiSource: Paralympic.org

=== Classification 5-8 ===
Classification round
Sweden (SWE)	39
Germany (GER)	38
Great Britain (GBR)	38
Switzerland (SUI)	34

Fifth place
Sweden (SWE)	40
Great Britain (GBR)	39
Seventh place
Germany (GER)	44
Switzerland (SUI)	37

Source: Paralympic.org

== Ranking ==
Place	Team
1st place, gold medalist(s)	United States
2nd place, silver medalist(s)	Australia
3rd place, bronze medalist(s)	New Zealand
4.	Canada
5.	Sweden
6.	Great Britain
7.	Germany
8.	Switzerland
