= Ambassador International =

- Parent company: Emerald House Group
- Founded: 1980
- Founder: Samuel Lowry
- Country of origin: United Kingdom
- Headquarters location: Belfast, Northern Ireland
- Distribution: International
- Key people: George Beverly Shea, C. Everett Koop, Hisashi Nikaidoh
- Publication types: Books
- Nonfiction topics: Christianity

Ambassador International, a division of Emerald House Group, is a Christian publishing company founded in Belfast, Northern Ireland, in 1980 by Samuel Lowry. In 1995, the United States office opened in Greenville, South Carolina. Today, the UK office publishes an average of twenty-five titles per year and the US office publishes an average of sixty titles, including fiction.

Ambassador International published the last authorized biography of gospel singer George Beverly Shea. In 2013, Ambassador published Healing Hearts, with a foreword by former US Surgeon General C. Everett Koop. The book was written by pediatric heart surgeon Hisashi Nikaidoh, known for the procedure that carries his name. Nikaidoh wrote the book about his experience of losing his son Hitoshi in a sudden accident in August 2003.

Other Ambassador International authors include Holly Durst, contestant of the reality show The Bachelor: Season 12 and winner of Bachelor Pad Season 2. Durst's children's book Chocolate Socks was published in March 2012. William (Bill) Renje, author of A Chosen Bullet: A Broken Man's Triumph Through Faith and Sports, won a gold medal in wheelchair rugby in the 1996 Summer Paralympics and the 2000 Summer Paralympics. Husband and wife authors Elizabeth and Kevin Morrisey wrote the book God's Lineup: Testimonies of Major League Baseball Players, which features several players, including Landon Powell, Trot Nixon, Stephen Drew and Matt Diaz. Ambassador International published missionary David Sitton's book Reckless Abandon: A Gospel pioneer's exploits among the most difficult to reach peoples in 2011, re-releasing the title with new content in 2013. Preacher and theologian John Piper endorsed the book. The book is dedicated to David's niece, Makayla Sitton, who, along with three other family members, was killed on Thanksgiving night 2009.
