= Wheelchair rugby at the 1996 Summer Paralympics =

Wheelchair rugby at the X Paralympic Games
- Paralympic Wheelchair rugby

Medalists
1st place, gold medalist(s)		United States	United States
2nd place, silver medalist(s)		Canada	Canada
3rd place, bronze medalist(s)		New Zealand	New Zealand

Paralympic symbol (1994-2004)

Wheelchair rugby at the 1996 Summer Paralympics consisted of a mixed team event. Wheelchair rugby was being contested as a demonstration sport, and not an official part of the Paralympic program, but medals were awarded and stayed on medal table. Six teams took part in the sport; Sweden and Australia were eliminated after the preliminary round.

== Medal summary ==
Event	Gold	Silver	Bronze
Mixed wheelchair rugby	United States (USA) William Renje; Clifton Chunn; Bradley Updegrove; David Ceruti; Joseph Soares; David Gould; Charles Crouch	Canada (CAN) Kirby Kranabetter; Raymond Lizotte; Daryl Stubel; David Tweed; Brian McPhate; Dany Belanger; Allan Semeniuk; Garett Hickling	New Zealand (NZL) Paul Leefe; Stephen Guthrie; Geremy Tinker; Robert Dickie; Sholto Taylor; Gary McMurray; Curtis Palmer; Grant Sharman

== Classification ==
Wheelchair rugby players were given a classification based on their upper body function. A committee gave each athlete a 7-level score ranging from 0.5 to 3.5, with lower scores corresponding to more severe disability. During the game, the total score of all players on the court for a team cannot exceed 8 points. However, for each female player on court, their team gets an extra 0.5 points over the 8 point limit.

== Teams ==
Six teams took part in this sport. Each team could have up to 12 athletes, but no more than 11 of the team members could be male. Listed below are the six teams qualified for the Atlanta Paralympics.

Qualified teams
United States (USA)
New Zealand (NZL)
Canada (CAN)
Great Britain (GBR)
Sweden (SWE)
Australia (AUS)

== Tournament ==
=== Competition format ===
The six teams participated in a single round robin tournament. The top four teams went on to compete for 1st through 4th place, while the last two teams are eliminated.

=== Preliminary round ===
Round robin
Rank	Team	Pld	W	L	PF:PA	Pts	USA	NZL	CAN	GBR	SWE	AUS
1	United States (USA)	5	5	0	213:120	10	x	48:34	47:26	50:26	37:16	31:18
2	New Zealand (NZL)	5	4	1	205:185	9	34:48	x	45:42	42:30	45:42	39:23
3	Canada (CAN)	5	3	2	171:167	8	26:47	42:45	x	34:29	30:22	39:24
4	Great Britain (GBR)	5	2	3	160:199	7	26:50	30:42	29:34	x	41:40	34:33
5	Sweden (SWE)	5	1	4	149:178	6	16:37	42:45	22:30	40:41	x	29:25
6	Australia (AUS)	5	0	5	123:172	5	18:31	23:39	24:39	33:34	25:29	x

Qualified for quarterfinals
Eliminated

Source: Paralympic.org

=== Medal round ===
Semifinals
United States	38
Great Britain	25
New Zealand	38
Canada	39

Gold-medal match
United States	37
Canada	30
Bronze-medal match
Great Britain	34
New Zealand	46

Source: Paralympic.org

== Ranking ==
Place	Team
1st place, gold medalist(s)	United States
2nd place, silver medalist(s)	Canada
3rd place, bronze medalist(s)	New Zealand
4.	Great Britain
5.	Sweden; Australia

== Gallery ==
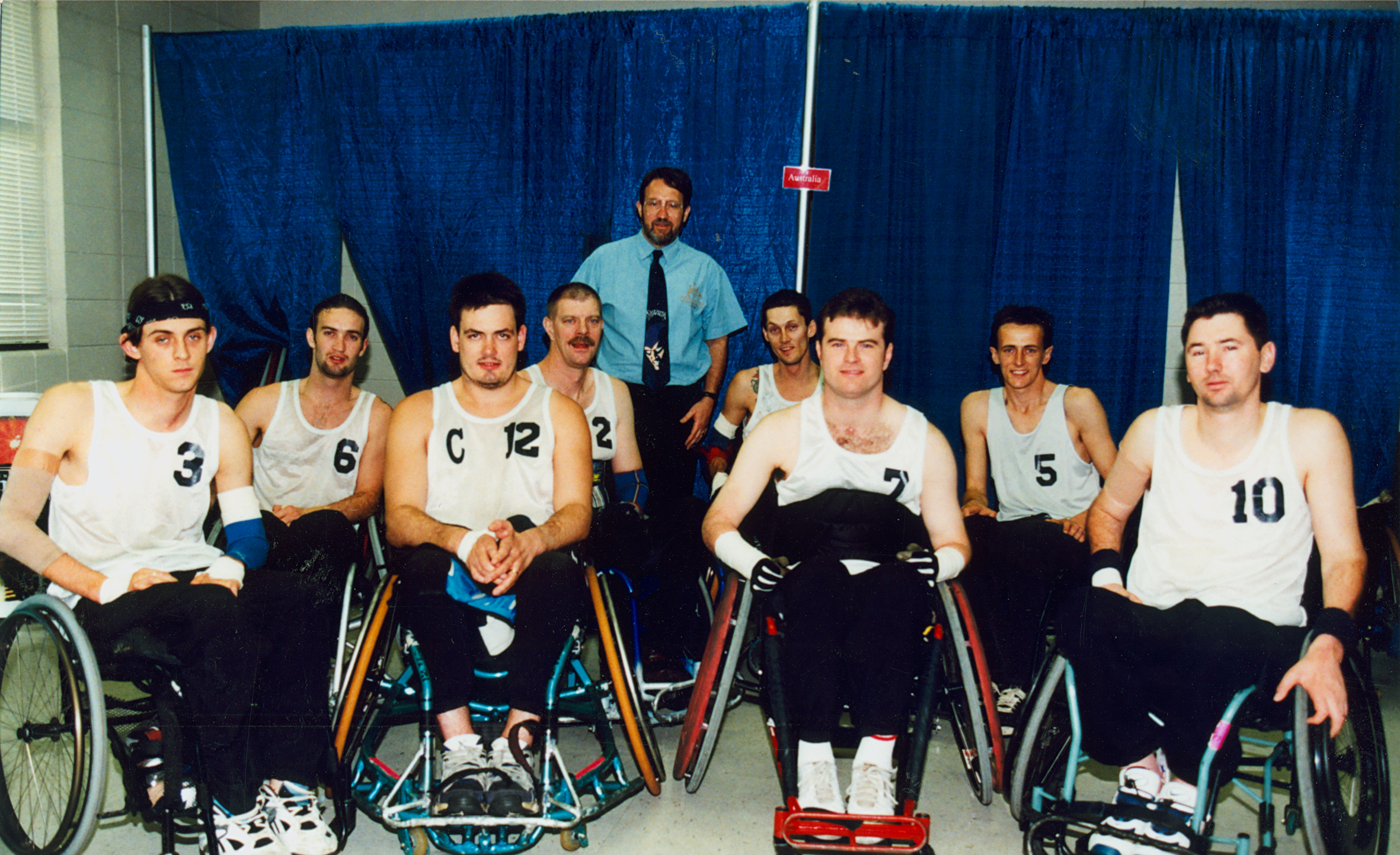

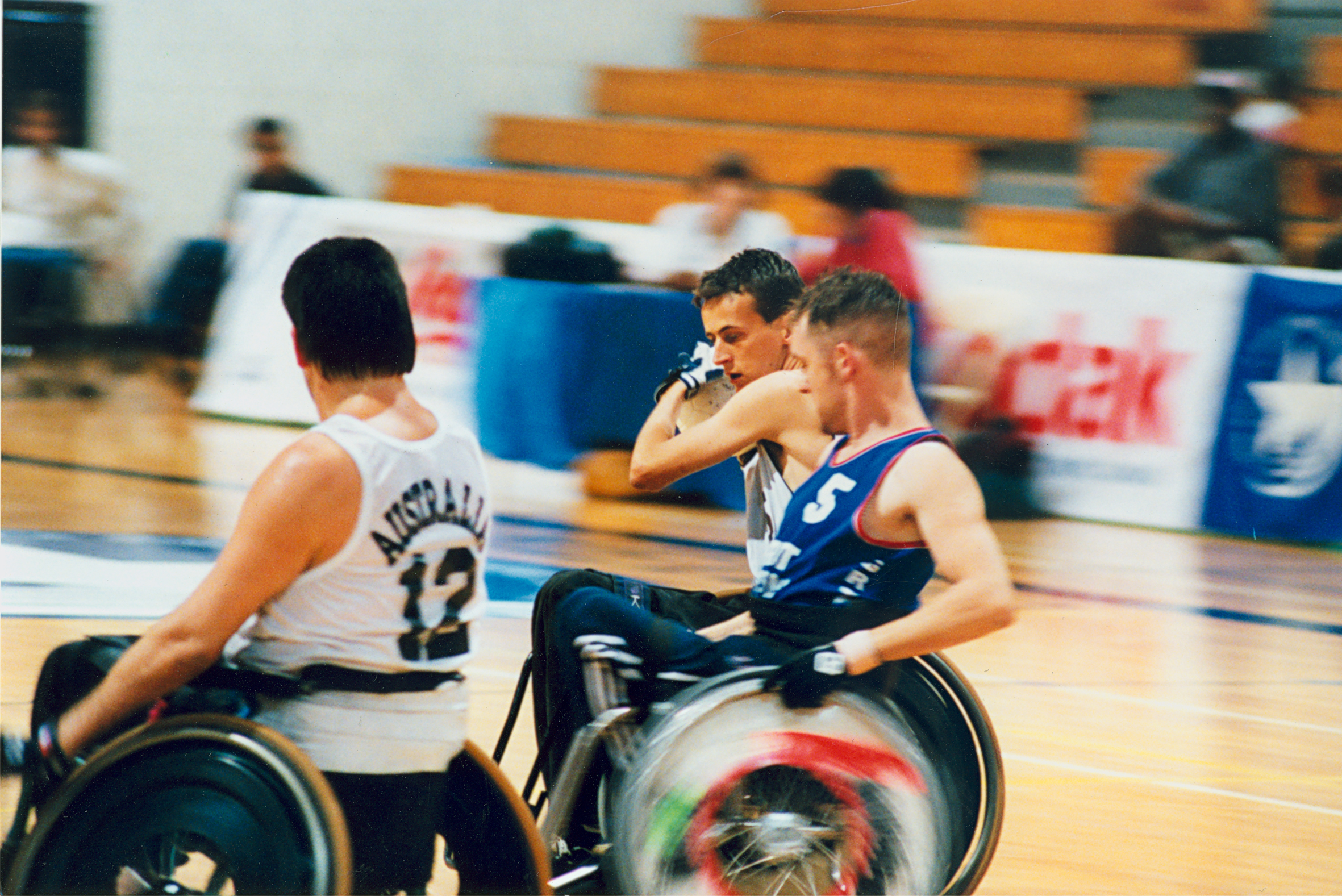

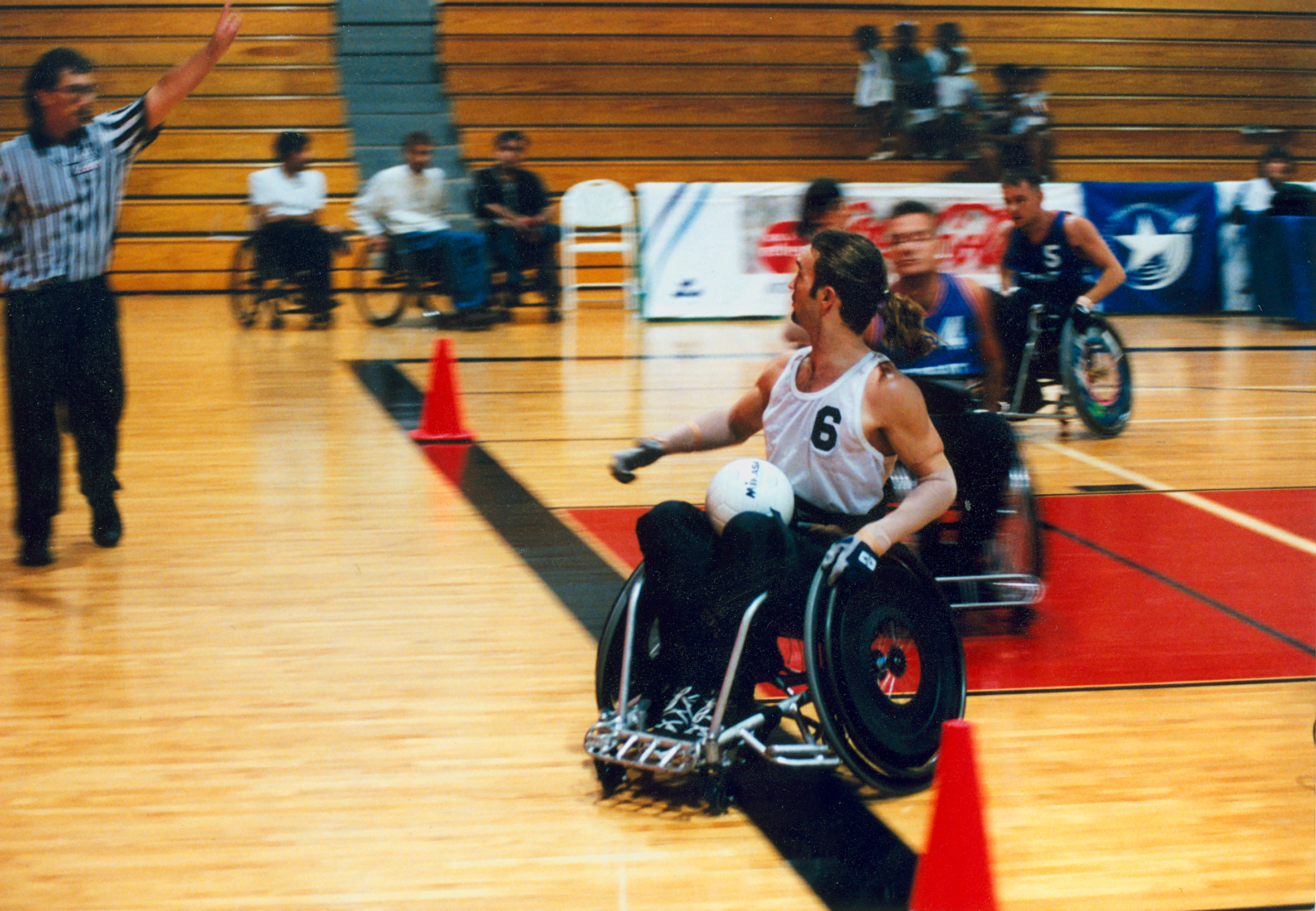

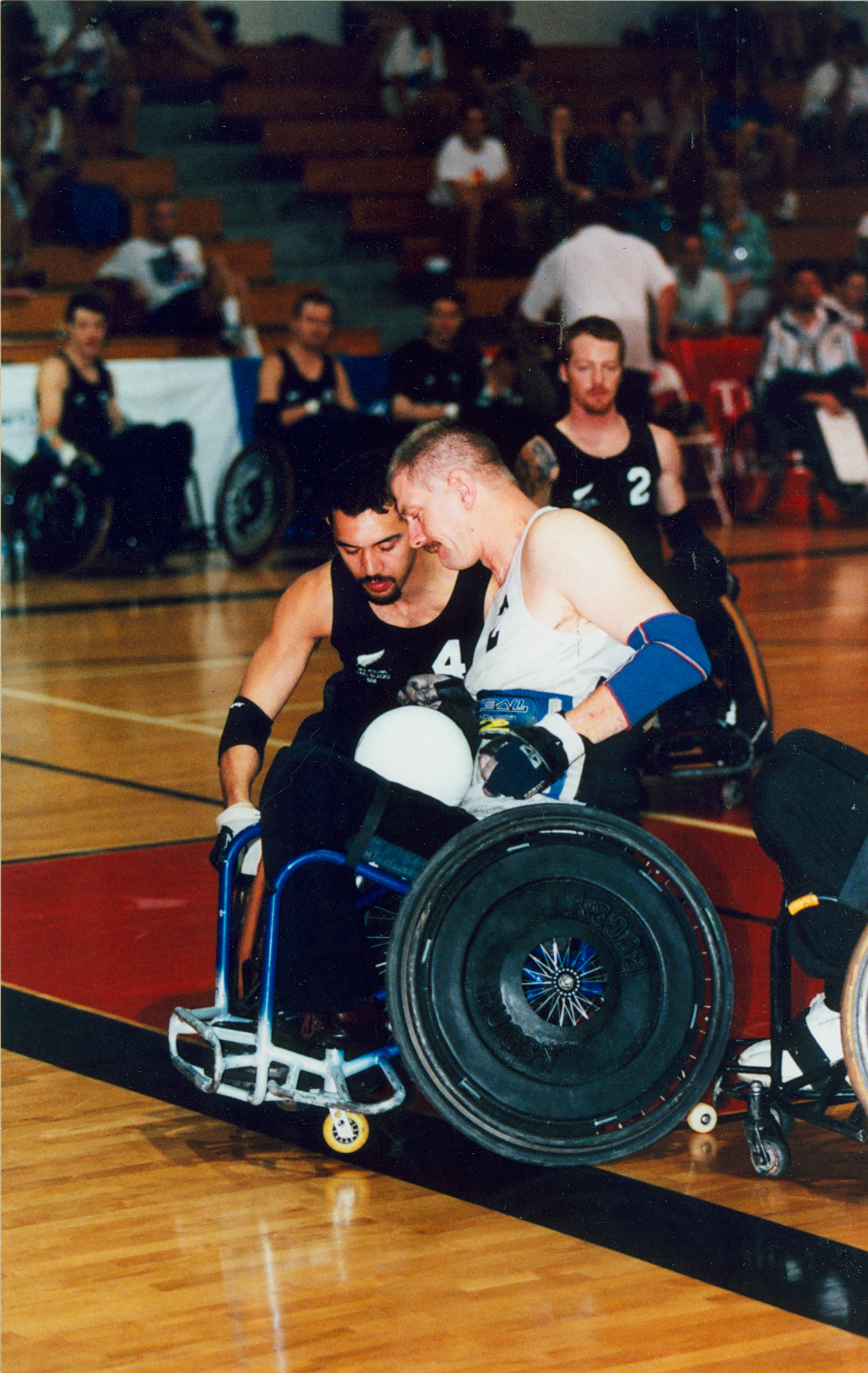

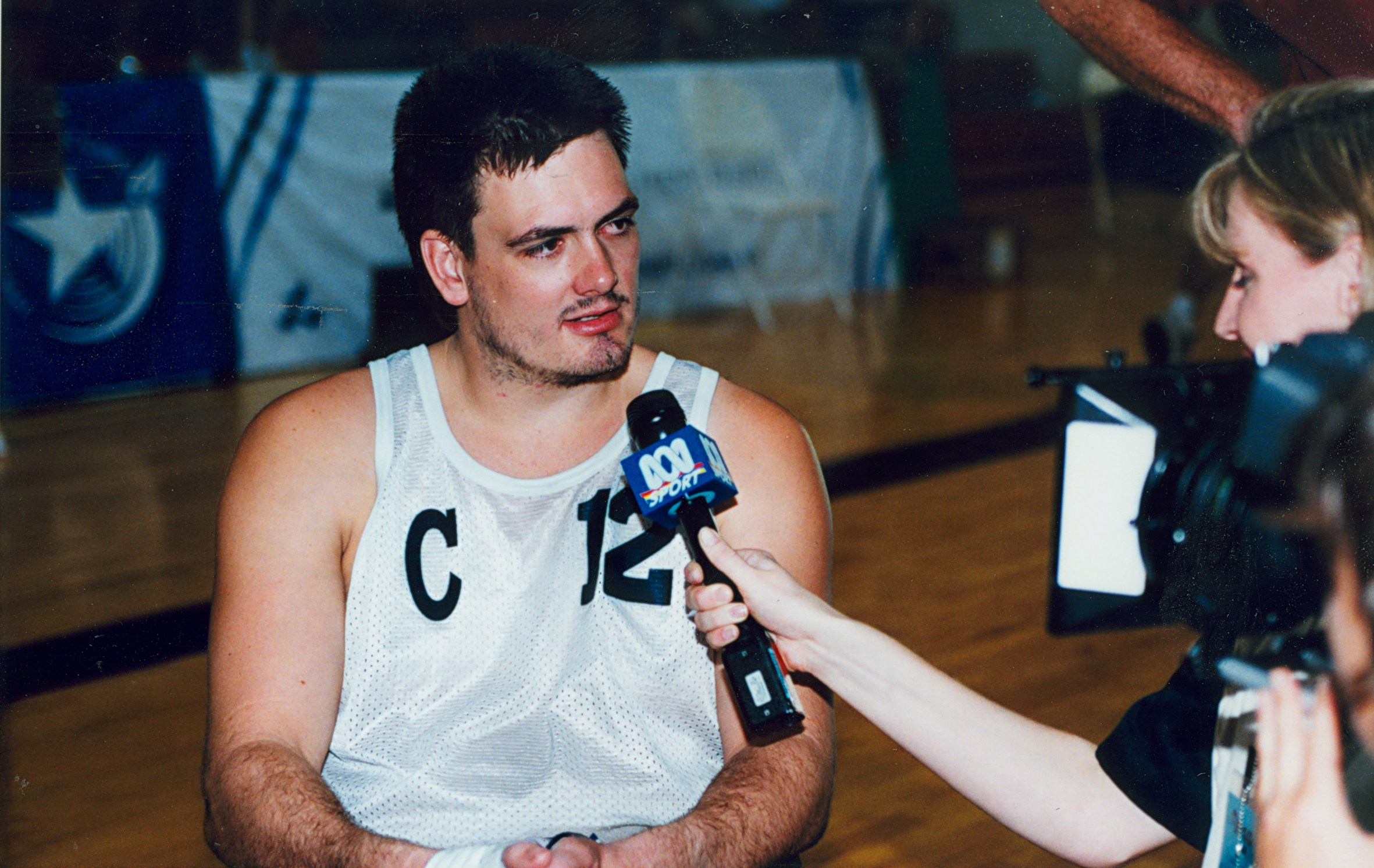

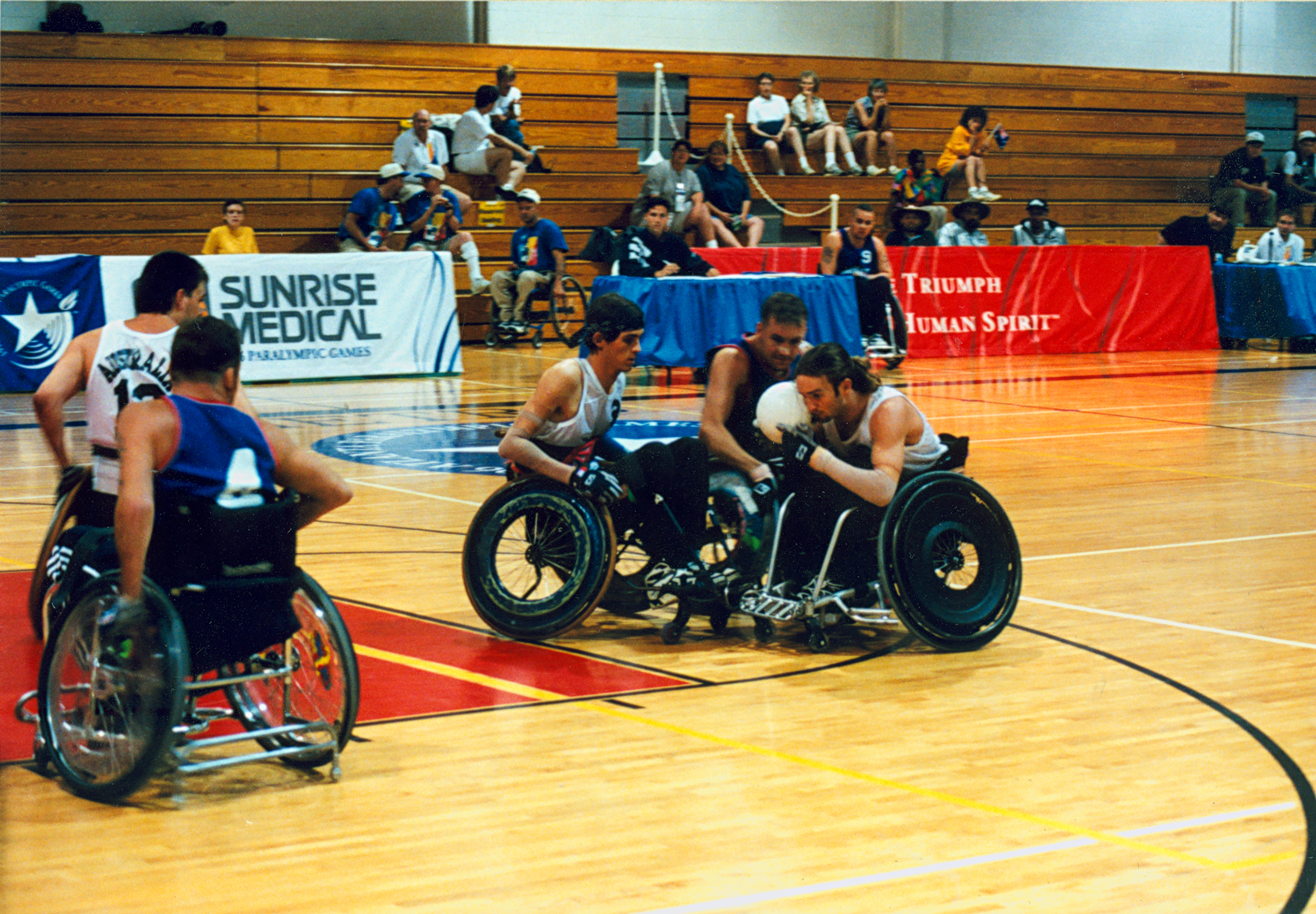

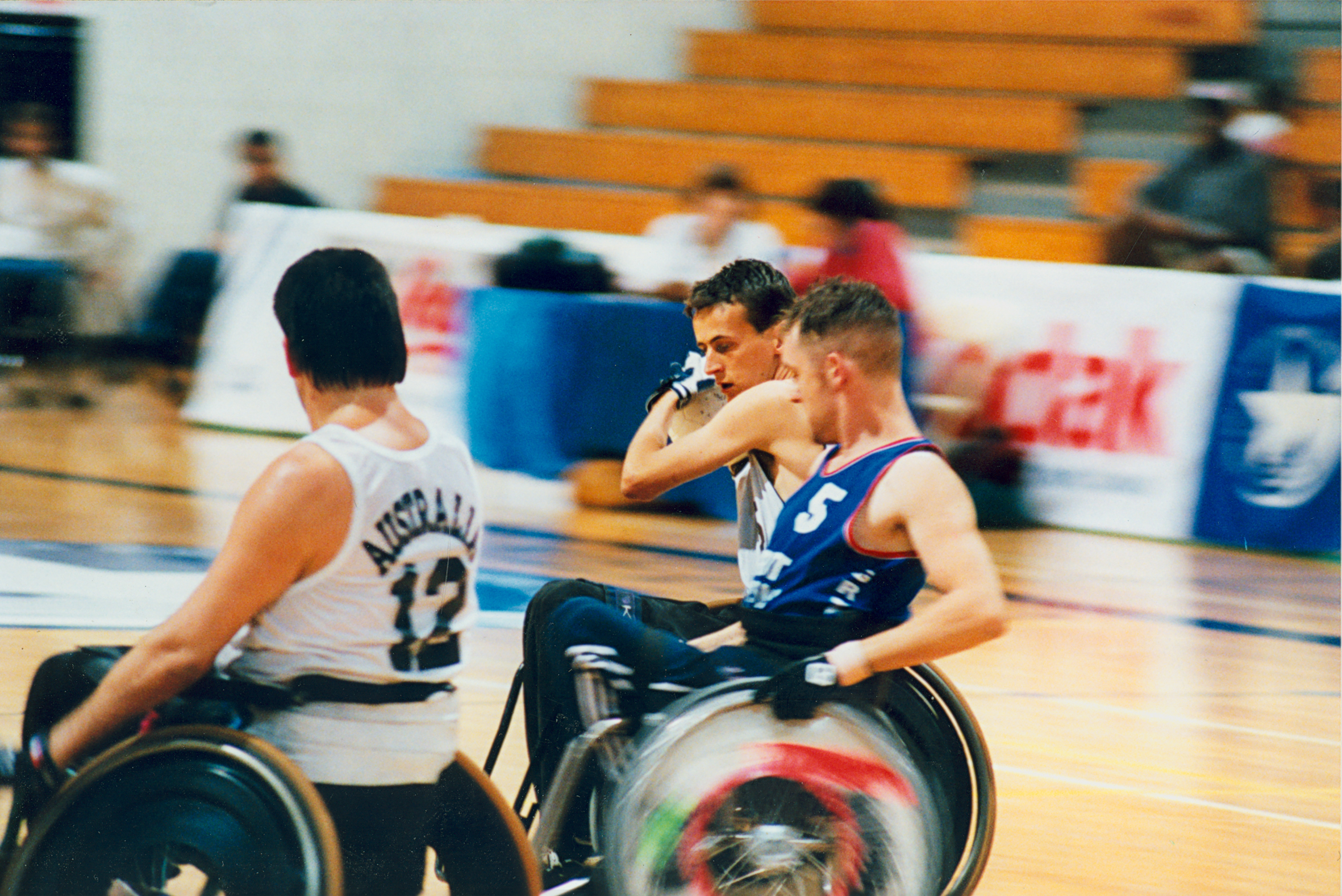

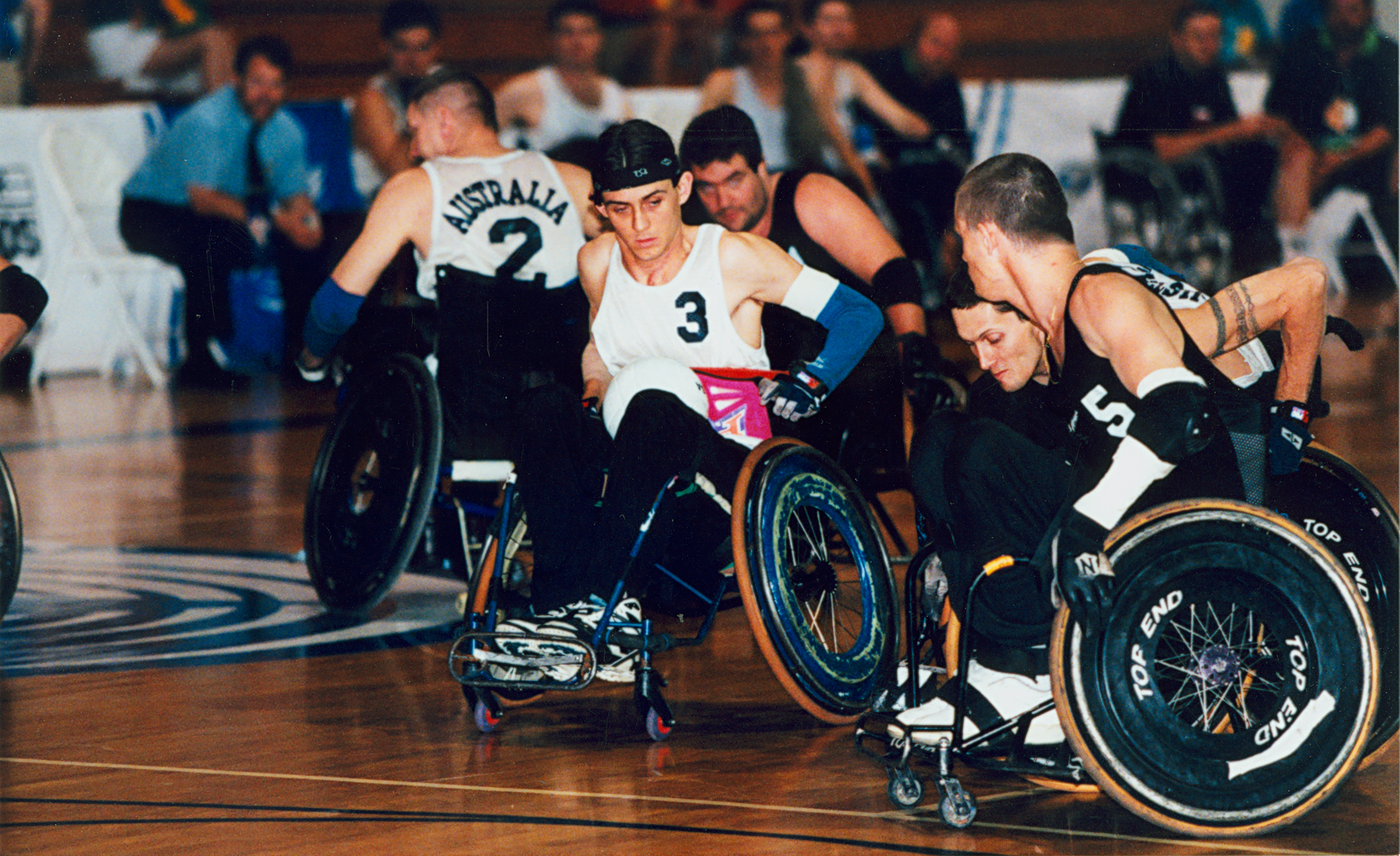

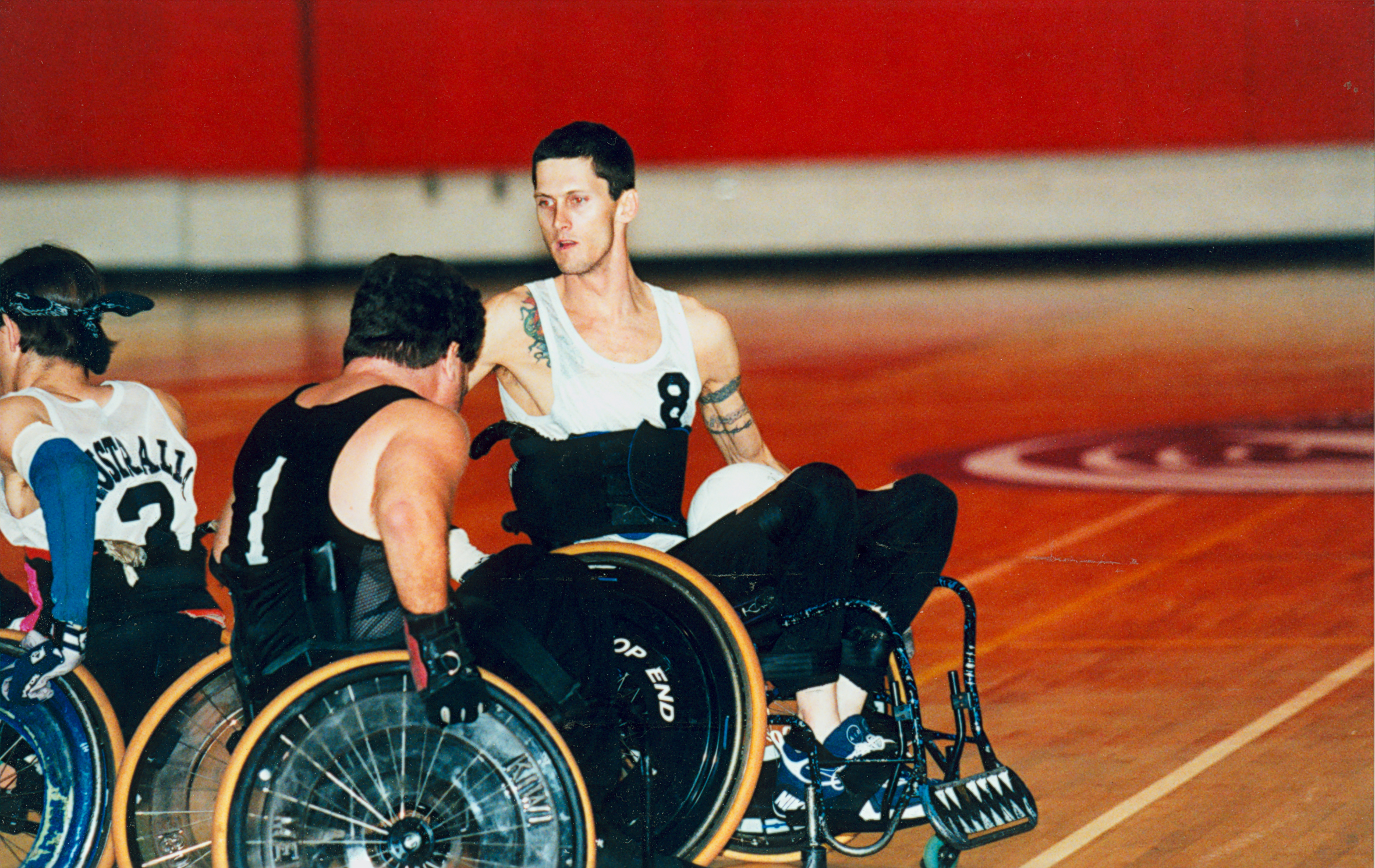

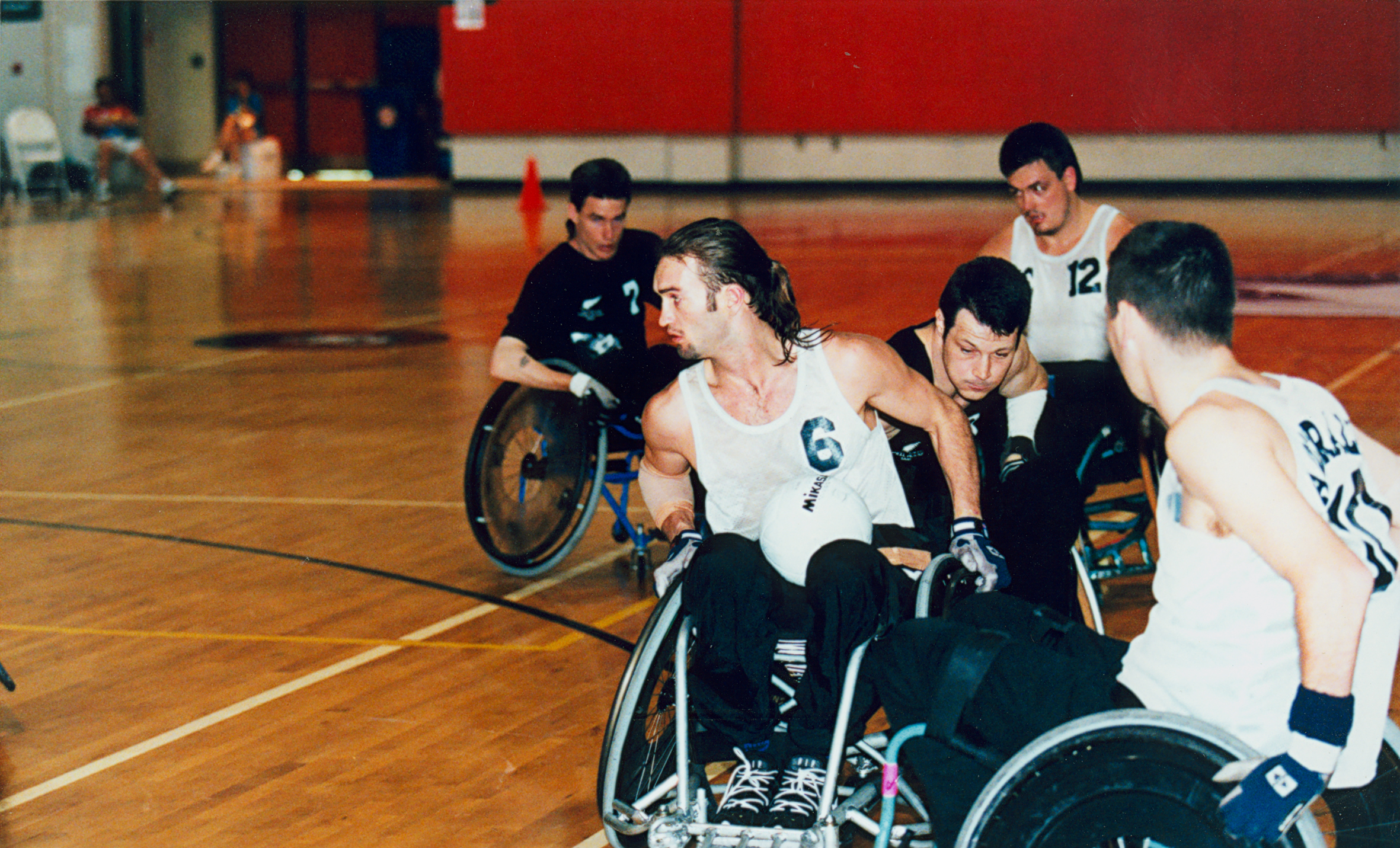

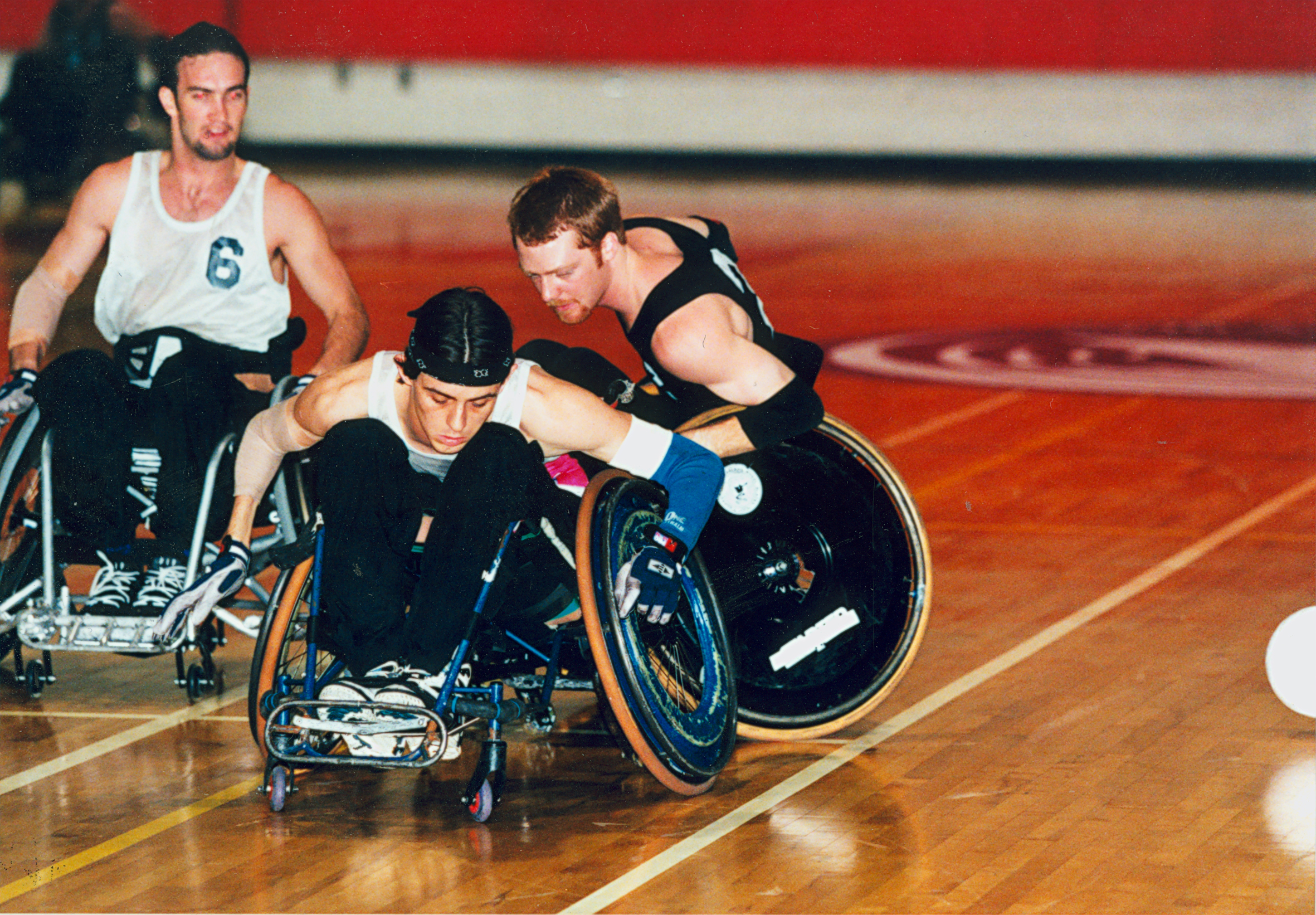

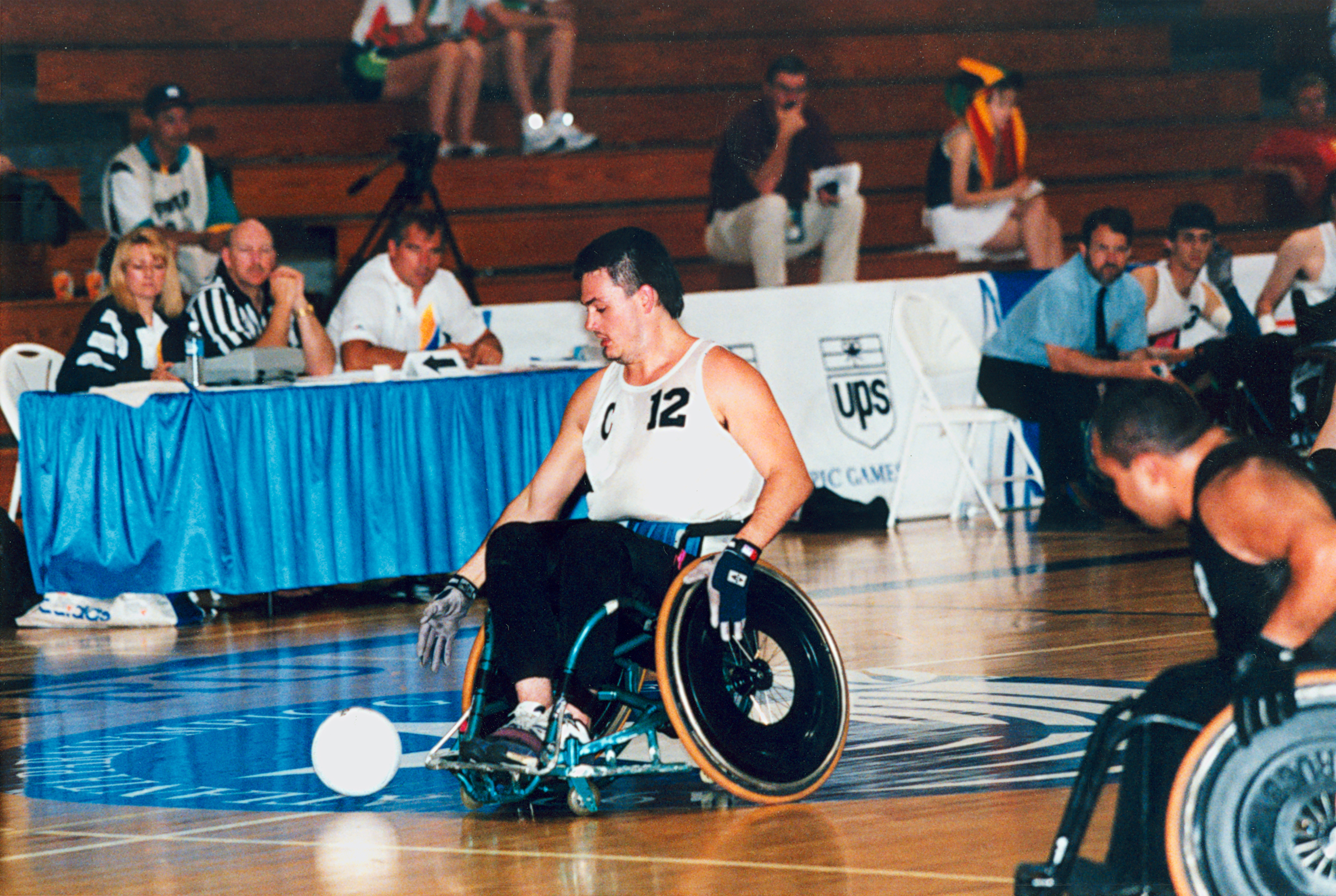
