= Joe Soares =

American wheelchair rugby player

Joe Soares is a former all-star wheelchair rugby player for the United States, a Paralympic gold medallist, who later coached the Canadian paralympic team after he was cut by the U.S. in 1996. This episode figures prominently in the 2005 documentary film Murderball.

== Biography ==
Soares was born into a poor family in Portugal, and moved to Providence, Rhode Island, at the age of 11. Soares lost the use of his legs after contracting childhood polio at the age of nine. He used crutches until he was in high school, when he switched to a wheelchair because he says it gave him greater mobility and he said the girls liked it.

Soares began playing rugby in 1969 and, as of 2005, was the only player to have participated in 13 consecutive United States National Championships. He was a member of the U.S. wheelchair rugby team that won the gold medal at the 1996 Summer Paralympics in Atlanta, Georgia. He was also a finalist in singles and a champion in doubles at the 1996 U.S. Open for wheelchair tennis in the Quad "A" Division.

Soares was cut from the U.S. team in 1996 and lost a lawsuit in an attempt to make a point soon after. Soares then applied to coach the United States team but was rejected. Due to wishing to continue with rugby Soares went on to coach the Canadian wheelchair rugby team, leading them to victory against the until then-undefeated United States team in Gothenburg, Sweden.

Soares was fired by the Canadian wheelchair rugby team in 2005 and moved on to coach the British team. Soares was released by the Great Britain Team in June 2008. In 2010, Soares began coaching the German national team. During his work for them, he failed to improve the German's IWRF World Ranking; instead, they dropped at the 2010 World Wheelchair Rugby Championships from 7th to 10th place. Soares coached Germany at the 2011 Europeans Wheelchair Rugby Championships, leading them to their worst historic placing and failing to qualify for the London 2012 Paralympics.

Soares and his wife Patricia have two sons, Joseph and Robert. Through the time that he coached Team Canada, he resided in the United States.
