= Barney Koneferenisi =

New Zealand wheelchair rugby player

Personal information
- Nationality: New Zealand
- Born: 9 March 1994 (age 31)

Barney Koneferenisi (born 9 March 1994) is a wheelchair rugby player from New Zealand, and a member of the national team, the Wheel Blacks. Koneferenisi won the 2013 NWRC GIO Most Trusted Player award, and appeared on New Zealand television programme Attitude.
