= Rick Draney =

American wheelchair tennis and wheelchair rugby athlete (born 1961)

- Country (sports): United States
- Born: August 2, 1961 (age 64)
- Plays: Right Handed
- Int. Tennis HoF: 2023 (member page)

Singles
- Career record: 126-67
- Highest ranking: No. 1 (29 July 1997)

Doubles
- Career record: 82-41
- Highest ranking: No. 1 (12 May 1998)

Rick Draney is a former wheelchair tennis and wheelchair rugby athlete.

In wheelchair tennis, he competed in the Quad Open division of the sport. Draney became involved with wheelchair tennis in 1984. He was instrumental in the development of the quad division in the United States and internationally.

Draney has a long list of accomplishments to his name: 20 singles and doubles titles at the U.S. Open and British Open Wheelchair Tennis Championships, as well as gold medals at the 1993 International Stoke Mandeville Games, the 1995 U.S. Olympic Festival, and the 1998 and 2003 World Team Cups. During his career, and when the International Tennis Federation officially established the Quad Open division, Draney achieved the world number 1 ranking in both singles and doubles.

In 1997, Draney was named the National Foundation Of Wheelchair Tennis' Player of the year. In 2012, Draney was the recipient of the USTA Brad Parks award, an award given annually by the United States Tennis Association to an individual or group involved with wheelchair tennis, in recognition of outstanding contribution to the sport. Draney has organized and assisted with wheelchair tennis clinics and camps throughout the world, introducing the sport of wheelchair tennis to juniors and adults since the 1980s. Draney also served as the Tournament Committee Chairperson for the U.S. Open Wheelchair Tennis Championships (San Diego, CA) from 1999 through 2007. In January 2018, the ITF announced that Draney was the recipient of the 2017 ITF Brad Parks award. He was inducted into the International Tennis Hall of Fame in 2023.

In wheelchair rugby, Draney earned three national championships with the Sharp Shadow wheelchair rugby team (San Diego, CA), a gold medal with Team USA at the 1994 World Championships and the gold medal at the 2000 Summer Paralympics in Sydney. He was named Pacific Sectionals MVP in 2001, and MVP of the 2002 National Championships (DII). He received three national championships all tournament team awards. Draney was recognized as Wheelchair Sports USA Athlete of the Year for Wheelchair Rugby in 1999. He has assisted with wheelchair rugby clinics and camps in several countries. Draney was inducted into the U.S. Wheelchair Rugby Association Hall of Fame in 2015.
