= Tom Kennedy (wheelchair rugby) =

Australian wheelchair rugby player

Personal information
- Nationality: Australian
- Born: 20 October 1957 (age 68) Wauchope, New South Wales
Medal record
Wheelchair rugby
Representing Australia
Paralympic Games
Silver medal – second place	2000 Sydney	Mixed

Tom Kennedy (born 20 October 1957) is an Australian Paralympic wheelchair rugby player. He won a silver medal at the 2000 Sydney Games in the mixed wheelchair rugby event. He was born in Wauchope, New South Wales.
