= Justin Muschamp =

New Zealand wheelchair rugby player

Medal record

Wheelchair rugby

Representing New Zealand

Paralympic Games
Bronze medal – third place	2000 Sydney	Mixed team

Justin Muschamp is a New Zealand wheelchair rugby player and a member of the national team, the Wheel Blacks.

Justin was part of the wheel blacks team that competed in the 2000 Summer Paralympics where they won the bronze medal.
