= Sue Gardiner =

Horticultural scientist in New Zealand

- Born: Susan Elizabeth Gardiner
- Education: University of Otago
- Awards: FRSNZ; FISHS; Outstanding International Horticulturist Award; Science New Zealand Plant & Food Research Lifetime Achievement Award; Prime Minister's Science Prize
- Scientific career
- Fields: Fruit breeding, genetics
- Thesis: Studies on the biochemical basis for the photoperiodic control of flowering. (1977)

Susan Elizabeth Gardiner is a New Zealand horticultural scientist, who works on using genetics and genomics for fruit breeding. Gardiner has received multiple awards. Gardiner has been a Fellow of the Royal Society Te Apārangi since 2020 and is a Fellow of the International Society for Horticultural Science. She is an Honorary Fellow of Plant & Food Research.

== Early life and education ==
Gardiner grew up on a family farm in Waiau, North Canterbury, and was homeschooled until the age of ten. She was later educated at St Margaret's College in Christchurch, and earned a PhD in biochemistry at the University of Otago. Her thesis, submitted in 1977, was titled Studies on the biochemical basis for the photoperiodic control of flowering.

== Career ==
Gardiner worked at Plant and Food Research from 1980 until her retirement in 1991. She founded the Mapping & Markers Team. Gardiner is known for her work using genetic markers to assist fruit breeding. She developed a high-throughput platform to create new varieties of apple and kiwifruit in a more precise way, so that growers could target specific qualities to advantage growers and consumers. For instance, by specifying desired colour, texture or pest resistance. Gardiner's research is credited with leading to New Zealand's status as an international leader in the breeding and genomics of apple and kiwifruit. In her retirement, Gardiner is an Honorary Fellow of Plant & Food Research and continues to work. Gardiner is involved in molecular genetics of Rhododendron for conservation purposes.

== Awards and honours ==
Gardiner won the Outstanding International Horticulturist Award of the American Society for Horticultural Science in 2009.

Gardiner received a Science New Zealand Plant & Food Research Lifetime Achievement Award in 2017. She was a member of the PSA Response Team, that won the Prime Minister's Science Prize in 2017.

Gardiner was elected as a Fellow of the Royal Society Te Apārangi in 2020. Her new fellows seminar was titled "Better Cultivars Faster". She is also a Fellow of the International Society for Horticultural Science.

== Selected works ==
- Riccardo Velasco; Andrey Zharkikh; Jason Affourtit; et al. (29 August 2010). "The genome of the domesticated apple (Malus × domestica Borkh.)". Nature Genetics. 42 (10): 833–839. doi:10.1038/NG.654. ISSN 1061-4036. PMID 20802477.
- Richard Espley; Cyril Brendolise; David Chagné; et al. (16 January 2009). "Multiple repeats of a promoter segment causes transcription factor autoregulation in red apples". The Plant Cell. 21 (1): 168–183. doi:10.1105/TPC.108.059329. ISSN 1040-4651. PMC 2648084. PMID 19151225.
- David Chagné; Ross N Crowhurst; Michela Troggio; et al. (2012). "Genome-wide SNP detection, validation, and development of an 8K SNP array for apple". PLOS One. 7 (2) e31745. Bibcode:2012PLoSO...731745C. doi:10.1371/JOURNAL.PONE.0031745. ISSN 1932-6203. PMC 3283661. PMID 22363718.
- Vladimir Shulaev; Schuyler S Korban; Bryon Sosinski; et al. (16 May 2008). "Multiple models for Rosaceae genomics". Plant Physiology. 147 (3): 985–1003. doi:10.1104/PP.107.115618. ISSN 0032-0889. PMC 2442536. PMID 18487361.
