= Jai Waite =

New Zealand wheelchair rugby player

Personal information
- Born: 3 November 1976 (age 49) New Plymouth, New Zealand
- Occupation: Documentary Film Editor
- Spouse: Rebecca Waite (Kennedy)
- Children: 2

Sport
- Disability: C5/6 Quadriplegic
Medal record
Wheelchair rugby
Representing New Zealand
Paralympic Games
Gold medal – first place	2004 Athens	Mixed team

Jai Waite (born 3 November 1976) is a wheelchair rugby player from New Zealand, and a member of the national team, the Wheel Blacks.

Jai competed for the wheel blacks at two paralympics, firstly in 2004 when they won the gold medal and also in the 2008 Summer Paralympics tournament where they placed fifth.

Jai has gone on to a successful career as a documentary film editor, winning 2 Apollo Awards for Best Editing (Factual/Drama), and twice receiving the award for Best Editing (Australia/New Zealand) Asian Academy Creative Awards.
