= Brent Poppen =

American paralympic sportsman, advocate, author, and teacher

Personal information
- Born: May 24, 1973 (age 53) Long Beach, California, U.S.
- Writing career
- Occupations: author, motivational speaker, rehab counselor
- Genres: biography, children's books
- Notable works: Tragedy on the Mountain, Playground Lessons-Friendship & Forgiveness: Harley and his wheelchair
- Website: www.hugsbybrent.com www.booksbybrent.com

Sport
- Country: United States
- Sport: Paralympics
- Events: Team Rugby, Individual Tennis

Achievements and titles
- National finals: 1996–1998, 2006, 2009–2010 National Quad Rugby Champion 2007 Japan Open Tennis Championships Doubles Champion
Medal record
Team Rugby
Representing United States
Paralympic Games
Bronze medal – third place	2004 Athens	Wheelchair Rugby
Wheelchair Rugby World Games
Silver medal – second place	2003	Wheelchair Rugby
World Team Cup
Gold medal – first place	2007	Tennis

Brent Poppen (born May 24, 1973) is an American disability advocate, author, substitute teacher, and Paralympian.

He has authored two books, a biography titled "Tragedy on the Mountain," which details his journey from paralysis to competing in the 2004 and 2008 Paralympics, as well as a children's book titled "Playground Lessons-Friendship & Forgiveness: Harley and his wheelchair."

== Early life ==
Poppen was injured in a wrestling accident on February 18, 1990, while visiting a Christian church camp located in Lake Hume, California After a wresting opponent fell on top of him, Poppen's spinal cord had an incomplete break at the level of the sixth cervical vertebra, rendering him a quadriplegic immediately. He was airlifted from a rural hospital, Fresno Community Hospital, later being sent to Long Beach Memorial Hospital, where he spent three months rehabilitating, and was released on May 23, 1990. He was 16 years old at the time of his accident, and released from the hospital the day before his 17th birthday. He is considered a limited motion quadriplegic, since he has limited function in his arms and hands.

Poppen attended Millikan High School, in Long Beach, for his senior year shortly after his accident. He went on to earn his associate degree from Long Beach City College, and then his bachelor's degree in social science from Chapman University.

== Athletic achievement/career ==
Poppen received his bachelor's degree, and subsequently his substitute teaching certificate, but is most widely known as an athlete. He has competed in two consecutive Paralympics, Athens in 2004 and Beijing in 2008, two world games and numerous world team cups in wheelchair rugby. He has a bronze medal from the 2004 Paralympics in Athens, where he competed for the American Wheelchair Rugby Team. He is a six-time National Quad Rugby Champion, from 1996 to 1998, and again in 2006. He is also known for being one of the athletes featured in "Murderball," an award-winning 2005 documentary about wheelchair rugby and the rivalry between the U.S. and Canadian teams leading up to the 2004 Paralympic Games.

In early 2014, Poppen was awarded the Curt Condon Spirit Award at the Southern California Tennis Association's Annual Meeting & Awards, held in the Straus Stadium Clubhouse at the Los Angeles Tennis Center – UCLA.

Following the end of his athletic career, Poppen began to work in education and rehabilitation. Poppen is part of the rehabilitation team at a children's hospital in his hometown of Fresno, California, providing additional resources to families in need, a substitute teacher, and has begun a career as a motivational speaker for schools in Southern and Central California. He has spoken at dozens of schools incorporating his books and his message that "anything is possible". His desire to be a motivational speaker began while competing internationally and speaking to students attending competitions in locations such as New Zealand, Athens, Beijing, and Buenos Aires.

Popper's life has been covered by numerous news outlets, including Paso Robles Magazine, Sports 'N Spokes: The Magazine for Wheelchair Sports and Recreation, The King City Rustler, Ventura County Star, The Long Beach Press Telegram, and has been a keynote speaker at California PTA's Statewide Convention in 2013.
