= Craig Parsons =

Australian wheelchair rugby player

Personal information
- Nationality: Australia
- Born: 18 June 1965 (age 61) Subiaco, Western Australia
Medal record
Wheelchair rugby
Paralympic Games
Silver medal – second place	2000 Sydney	Mixed

Craig Parsons (born 18 June 1965) is a Paralympic table tennis and wheelchair rugby union player from Australia. He was born in Subiaco, Western Australia. He won a silver medal at the 2000 Sydney Games in the mixed wheelchair rugby event. He participated in table tennis at the 1988 Seoul Games.
