= Bill Oughton =

New Zealand wheelchair rugby player

Medal record

Wheelchair rugby

Representing New Zealand

Paralympic Games
Gold medal – first place	2004 Athens	Team competition
Bronze medal – third place	2000 Sydney	Team competition

Bill Oughton was a wheelchair rugby player from New Zealand, and a member of the national team, the Wheel Blacks.

Bill competed for the Wheel Blacks at two Paralympic Games, winning a medal in each. First he won a bronze medal in the 2000 Summer Paralympics becoming New Zealand Paralympian #129, before being part of the gold medal-winning team in 2004.

Bill died on 31 December 2022. He had a wife (Michelle) and twin sons Jack and Pete.
