= Tim Johnson (wheelchair rugby) =

New Zealand rugby union player (born 1976)

Tim Johnson MNZM
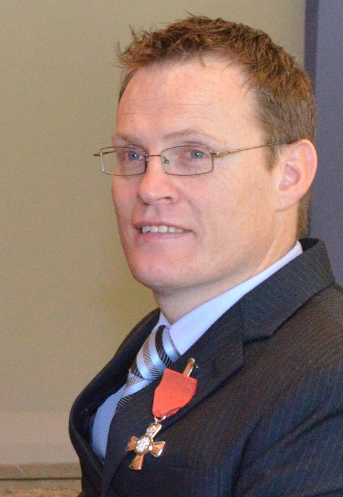
- Johnson in 2015

Personal information
- Full name: Timothy Clarence Johnson
- Born: 4 February 1976 (age 50) Christchurch, New Zealand
- Education: St Bede's College; University of Canterbury
- Height: 187 cm (6 ft 2 in)
- Weight: 83 kg (183 lb; 13 st 1 lb)
- Spouse: Helen Murphy (m. 2011)
Medal record
Wheelchair rugby
Representing New Zealand
Paralympic Games
Gold medal – first place	2004 Athens	Mixed team
Bronze medal – third place	2000 Sydney	Mixed team
World Championships
Silver medal – second place	1998 Toronto	Team
Silver medal – second place	2006 Christchurch	Team

Timothy Clarence Johnson MNZM (born 4 February 1976) is a New Zealand disability sports administrator and former wheelchair rugby player. He is a past captain of the Wheel Blacks, the New Zealand wheelchair rugby team.

Johnson was a member of New Zealand wheelchair rugby teams from 1998 until 2010, including the gold medal-winning team at the 2004 Summer Paralympics in Athens and the bronze medal-winning team at the 2000 Paralympics in Sydney. At the 2008 Paralympics, he was both a player and assistant coach for the New Zealand team, which finished in fifth place. He won silver at the world championships in Toronto in 1998 and in Christchurch in 2006, and was captain of the 2006 team.

He served as the president of New Zealand Wheelchair Rugby from 2003 to 2004, and from 2011 until 2014. He was also the organisation's treasurer between 2005 and 2006. He has served as an Athlete Council representative on the New Zealand Olympic Committee from 2003 to 2014.

Johnson studied at the University of Canterbury and the Christchurch College of Education, graduating with a Bachelor of Engineering with Honours in electrical, electronics and communications engineering in 1998, a Graduate Diploma in Teaching and Learning (Secondary) in 1999, and a Master of Engineering in 2004. He has also studied and the Victoria University of Technology, Melbourne and the Auckland University of Technology. He completed papers towards a Graduate Diploma in Career Counselling for Elite Athletes in 2005, and graduated with a Graduate Certificate in Business Administration (Part MBA) in 2015. He has been awarded University of Canterbury and New Zealand Universities Blues for wheelchair rugby.

He currently serves as the Lead of the World Wheelchair Rugby (WWR) Competitions Working Group where he has been an active member from 2007. He is Assistant Technical Delegate at the Paris 2024 Summer Paralympics and also the Technical Delegate for the 2023 International Wheelchair Rugby Cup. He has also been Technical Delegate for the 2023 WWR Asia-Oceania Championship, the 2018 IWRF World Championships, and the 2013, 2015 and 2019 IWRF Asia-Oceania Championships.

He worked in numerous roles at the Accident Compensation Corporation from 2006 to 2019

In the 2015 Queen's Birthday Honours, Johnson was appointed a Member of the New Zealand Order of Merit, for services to disability sport.
