= Wheelchair rugby at the 2004 Summer Paralympics =

Wheelchair rugby at the XII Paralympic Games
- Paralympic Wheelchair rugby
- Venue: Helliniko Indoor Arena
- Dates: 19–25 September 2004

Medalists
1st place, gold medalist(s)		New Zealand	New Zealand
2nd place, silver medalist(s)		Canada	Canada
3rd place, bronze medalist(s)		United States	United States

Wheelchair Rugby at the 2004 Summer Paralympics was held at the Helliniko Indoor Arena. 89 athletes participated in the competition, with teams from eight countries taking part.

While wheelchair rugby was designated as a mixed sport, with both men and women eligible to participate in the competition, no female athletes took part.

New Zealand's victory in the gold medal game represented the first time that a country from outside North America had won a Paralympics or World Championships title in the sport.

The wheelchair rugby competition in Athens was featured in the 2005 documentary film, Murderball.

== Medalists ==
Event	Gold	Silver	Bronze
Mixed wheelchair rugby	New Zealand (NZL) Dan Buckingham; Stephen Guthrie; Bill Oughton; Timothy Johnson; Geremy Tinker; Jai Waite; Sholto Taylor; Gary McMurray; Curtis Palmer	Canada (CAN) Allan Cartrand; Fabien Lavoie; Jared Funk; David Willsie; Patrice Simard; Mike Bacon; Michael Whitehead; Daniel Paradis; Raymond Lizotte; Garett Hickling; Ian Chan; Allan Semenuik	United States (USA) Lynn Nelson; Clifton Chunn; Wayne Romero; Brent Poppen; Will Groulx; Scott Hogsett; Bob Lujano; Andy Cohn; Norman Lyduch; Bryan Kirkland; Mark Zupan; Sam Gloor

== Classification ==
Wheelchair rugby players were given a classification based on their upper body function. A committee gave each athlete a 7-level score ranging from 0.5 to 3.5, with lower scores corresponding to more severe disability. During the game, the total score of all players on the court for a team cannot exceed 8 points. However, for each female player on court, their team gets an extra 0.5 points over the 8 point limit.

== Teams ==
Eight teams took part in this sport. Each team could have up to 12 athletes, but no more than 11 of the team members could be male. Listed below are the eight teams qualified for the Athens Paralympics.

Qualified teams
1. United States (USA)
2. Canada (CAN)
3. Australia (AUS)
4. Great Britain (GBR)
6. New Zealand (NZL)
5. Germany (GER)
8. Japan (JPN)
7. Belgium (BEL)

== Tournament ==
=== Competition format ===
The eight teams were divided into two even groups and participated in a single round robin tournament. The top two teams from each group went on to compete for 1st through 4th place, while the last two teams from each group competed for 5th through 8th place.

=== Preliminary Round ===
Group A
Rank	Team	Pld	W	L	G:GA	Pts
1	United States (USA)	3	3	0	138:109	6
2	New Zealand (NZL)	3	2	1	120:101	5
3	Australia (AUS)	3	1	2	117:137	4
4	Japan (JPN)	3	0	3	121:149	3

Group B
Rank	Team	Pld	W	L	G:GA	Pts
1	Great Britain (GBR)	3	3	0	100:82	6
2	Canada (CAN)	3	2	1	96:91	5
3	Belgium (BEL)	3	1	2	91:93	4
4	Germany (GER)	3	0	3	93:114	3

Qualified for quarterfinals

Time	Match	Teams	Final score
September 19, 2004
10:00	1	GBR vs. BEL	27 - 22
12:00	2	CAN vs. GER	33 - 30 (OT)
17:00	3	USA vs. JPN	54 - 39
19:00	4	AUS vs. NZL	31 - 41
September 20, 2004
10:00	5	GER vs. BEL	33 - 40
12:00	6	CAN vs. GBR	30 - 32 (OT)
17:00	7	AUS vs. JPN	48 - 47
19:00	8	USA vs. NZL	35 - 32
September 21, 2004
10:00	9	GBR vs. GER	40 - 33
12:00	10	CAN vs. BEL	33 - 29
17:00	11	NZL vs. JPN	47 - 35
19:00	12	USA vs. AUS	49 - 38

Source: Paralympic.org

=== Medal round ===
Quarterfinals
23 September 2004 - 10:00
United States	46
Germany	34
23 September 2004 - 19:00
Canada	36
Australia	33
23 September 2004 - 12:00
Great Britain	50
Japan	42
23 September 2004 - 17:00
New Zealand	40
Belgium	33

Semifinals
24 September 2004 - 17:00
United States	20
Canada	24
24 September 2004 - 19:00
Great Britain	35
New Zealand	39

Gold medal match
25 September 2004 - 19:00
Canada	29
New Zealand	31
Bronze medal match
25 September 2004 - 17:00
Great Britain	39
United States	43

Source: Paralympic.org

=== Classification 5-8 ===
Classification round
24 September 2004 - 10:00
Belgium	36
Japan	35
24 September 2004 - 12:00
Australia	44
Germany	40

Fifth place
25 September 2004 - 12:00
Belgium	43
Australia	46
Seventh place
25 September 2004 - 10:00
Germany	41
Japan	40

Source: Paralympic.org

== Ranking ==
Place	Team
1st place, gold medalist(s)	New Zealand
2nd place, silver medalist(s)	Canada
3rd place, bronze medalist(s)	United States
4.	Great Britain
5.	Australia
6.	Belgium
7.	Germany
8.	Japan
