= Dan Buckingham =

New Zealand wheelchair rugby player

Dan Buckingham MNZM
- Buckingham in 2026

Personal information
- Born: Daniel Gerard Buckingham; 25 September 1980 (age 45) Invercargill, New Zealand

Sport
- Country: New Zealand
- Sport: Wheelchair rugby
- Disability class: 3.0
- Club: Auckland
- Team: Wheel Blacks (2001–2016)
Medal record
Wheelchair rugby
Representing New Zealand
Paralympic Games
Gold medal – first place	2004 Athens	Mixed team
World Championships
Silver medal – second place	2006 Christchurch	Mixed team

Daniel Gerard Buckingham MNZM (born 25 September 1980) is a New Zealand wheelchair rugby player, and was a member of the national team, the Wheel Blacks for 16 years. He worked as CEO for the Television Production Company Attitude, and is now the chief executive of Able, which produces accessible audiovisual media.

== Early life ==
Buckingham was born in Invercargill and grew up in rural Southland. He is the youngest of three siblings. He attended boarding school at St Kevin's College in Oamaru from 1994 to 1996, before changing to Verdon College from 1997 to 1998 where he captained the school's 1st XV rugby union team.

In August 1999, while a surveying student at the University of Otago, Buckingham sustained a fracture dislocation to his C6/7 vertebrae playing club rugby, resulting in paralysis from the chest down, with some loss of function to his hands. He completed his rehabilitation at Burwood Hospital, where he learned to use a manual wheelchair for mobility.

== Domestic wheelchair rugby ==
Buckingham began training with the Canterbury wheelchair rugby team while still in the Burwood Hospital spinal injury rehabilitation unit in 1999. After returning to Dunedin, he completed a Certificate in Fitness Management, and continued to play for Canterbury in 2000. He played his first national tournament for the province that year, and moved to Christchurch in 2001. He played of Canterbury until 2007.

In 2003, Buckingham began a Bachelor of Arts degree course at the University of Canterbury, studying part-time while training and competing internationally in wheelchair rugby. He completed the degree at the end of 2006.

In 2008, Buckingham began playing for Auckland after moving to the city at the end of 2007. He coached the team from 2014 to 2016.

== International wheelchair rugby ==
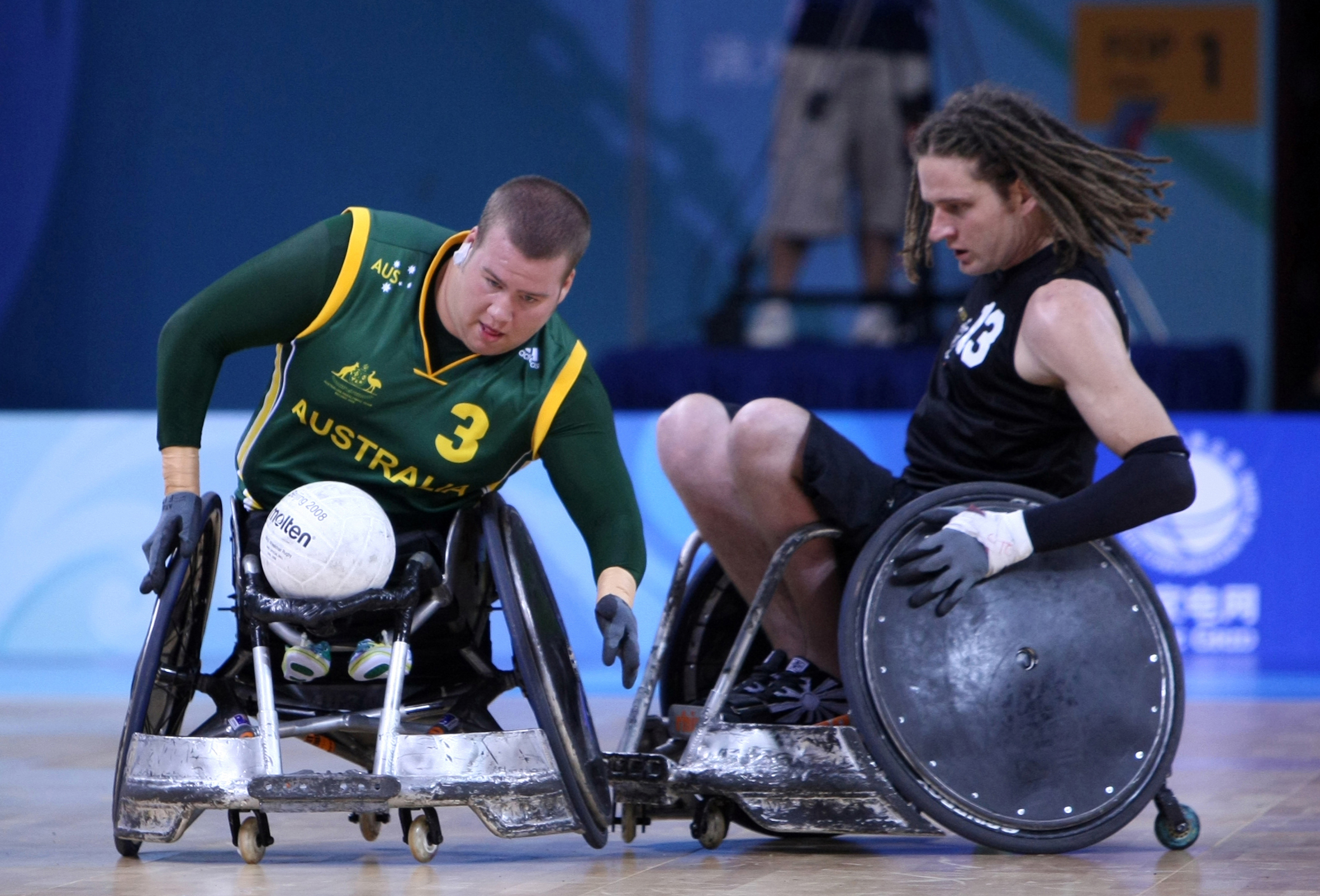
Australia's Ryley Batt (left) against Buckingham (right) in 2008

Buckingham first made the New Zealand team in 2001, playing a five-test series against Australia for the Chris Handy Cup in Christchurch.

He has competed in four world championships: Gothenburg 2002, Christchurch 2006, Vancouver 2010 and Odense 2014. He was part of the team that won silver at the 2006 World Championships, losing to the United States in the final.

Buckingham competed as part of the Wheel Blacks at the 2004 Paralympic Games in Athens, where they won the gold medal, as well as the 2008 Paralympic Games in Beijing, where they finished fifth. He captained the Wheel Blacks from 2007 to 2013, and again from 2015 to 2016.

Buckingham has also competed for domestic clubs internationally, including Victoria in Australia, Denver and Lakeshore in the US, and Quebec in Canada.

== Career ==
In 2008, Buckingham began working for Attitude as a researcher and presenter. He became CEO producer in 2019. In 2022, he became chief executive of Able.

In the 2026 King's Birthday Honours, Buckingham was appointed a Member of the New Zealand Order of Merit, for services to people with disabilities and wheelchair rugby.
