= Peter Harding (wheelchair rugby) =

Australian Paralympic wheelchair rugby player

Personal information
- Nationality: Australian
- Born: 4 February 1969 (age 57) Mildura, Victoria, Australia
Medal record
Wheelchair rugby
Representing Australia
Paralympic Games
Silver medal – second place	2000 Sydney	Mixed

Peter Harding (born 4 February 1969) is an Australian Paralympic wheelchair rugby player. He was born in Mildura, Victoria. He won a silver medal at the 2000 Sydney Games with the Australian Steelers.
