= Clifford Clarke =

Australian Paralympic wheelchair rugby player

Personal information
- Nationality: Australia
- Born: 2 May 1969 (age 57) Carlton, Victoria
Medal record
Wheelchair rugby
Paralympic Games
Silver medal – second place	2000 Sydney	Mixed

Clifford Clarke (born 2 May 1969) is an Australian Paralympic wheelchair rugby player from Australia. He was born in Carlton, Victoria. He won a silver medal at the 2000 Sydney Games with the Australian Steelers.
