= Paul Leefe =

New Zealand wheelchair rugby player

Personal information
- Born: 13 October 1970 (age 55)
Medal record
Wheelchair rugby
Representing New Zealand
Paralympic Games
Bronze medal – third place	1996 Atlanta	Mixed team
Bronze medal – third place	2000 Athens	Mixed team

Paul Leefe (born 13 October 1970) is a wheelchair rugby player from New Zealand, and a member of the national team, the Wheel Blacks.

Paul was a member of the wheel blacks at the inaugural Paralympic wheelchair rugby tournament in 1996 Summer Paralympics where it was a demonstration event. He remained a part of the team for the next paralympics in 2000 where the team won a bronze medal.
