= George Hucks =

Australian wheelchair rugby player

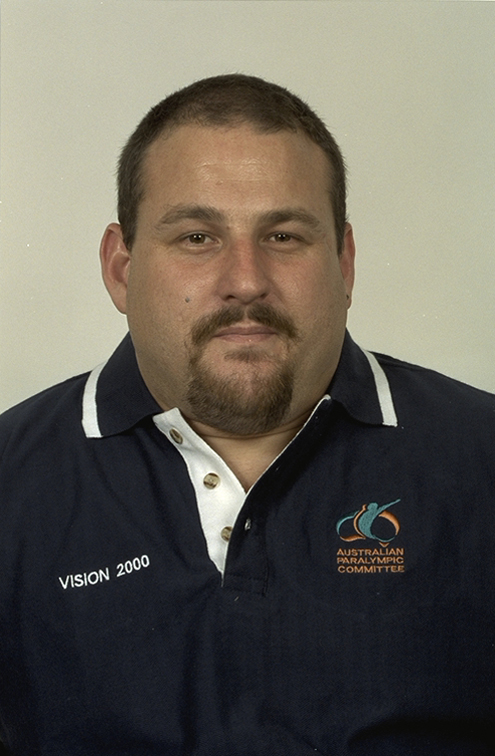
- 2000 Australian Paralympic team portrait of Hucks

Personal information
- Nationality: Australia
- Born: 18 January 1968 (age 58) Port Augusta, South Australia
Medal record
Wheelchair rugby
Paralympic Games
Silver medal – second place	2000 Sydney	Mixed
Silver medal – second place	2008 Beijing	Mixed

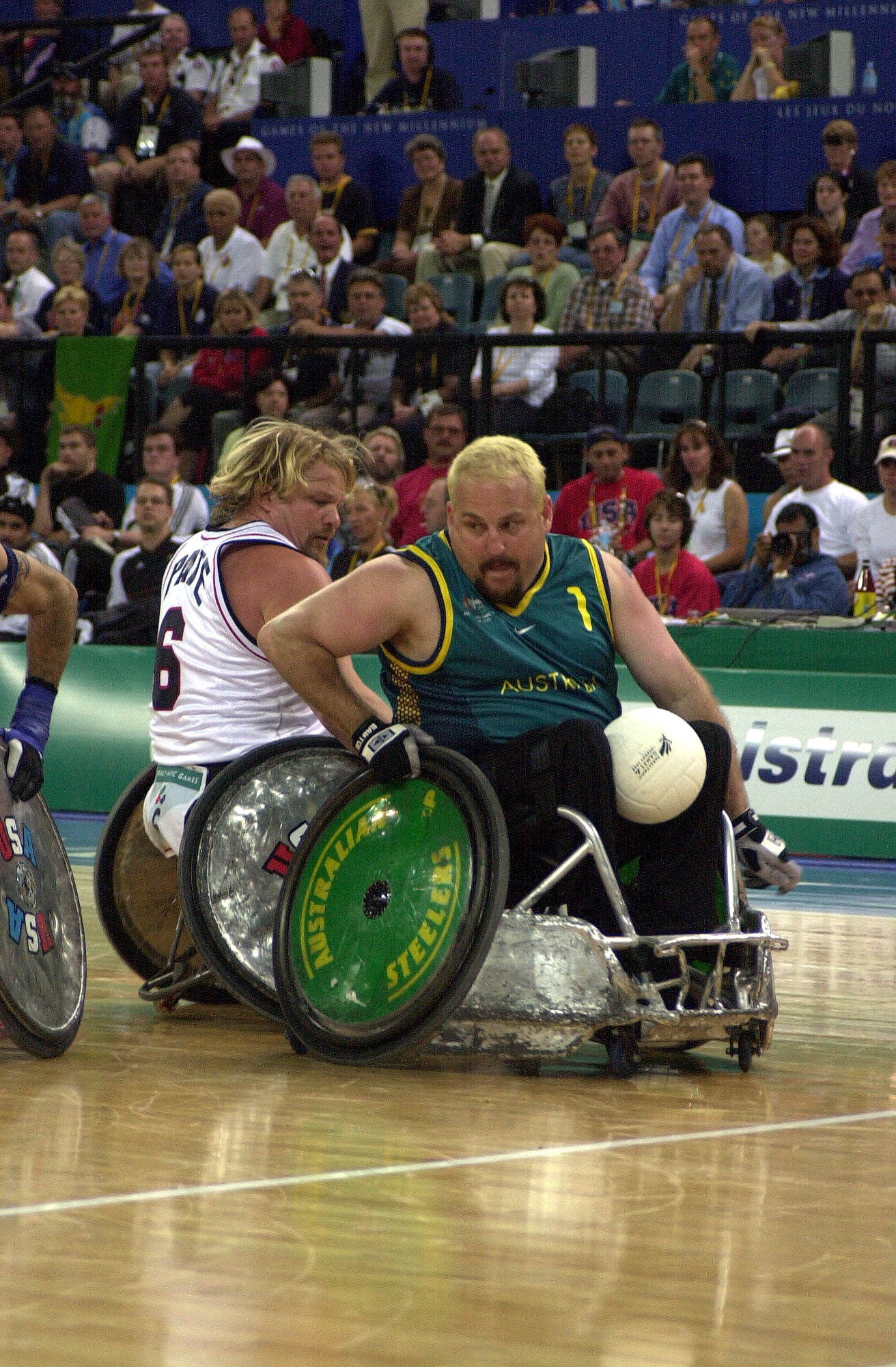
Action shot of Hucks (right) with the ball during a match at the 2000 Sydney Paralympics

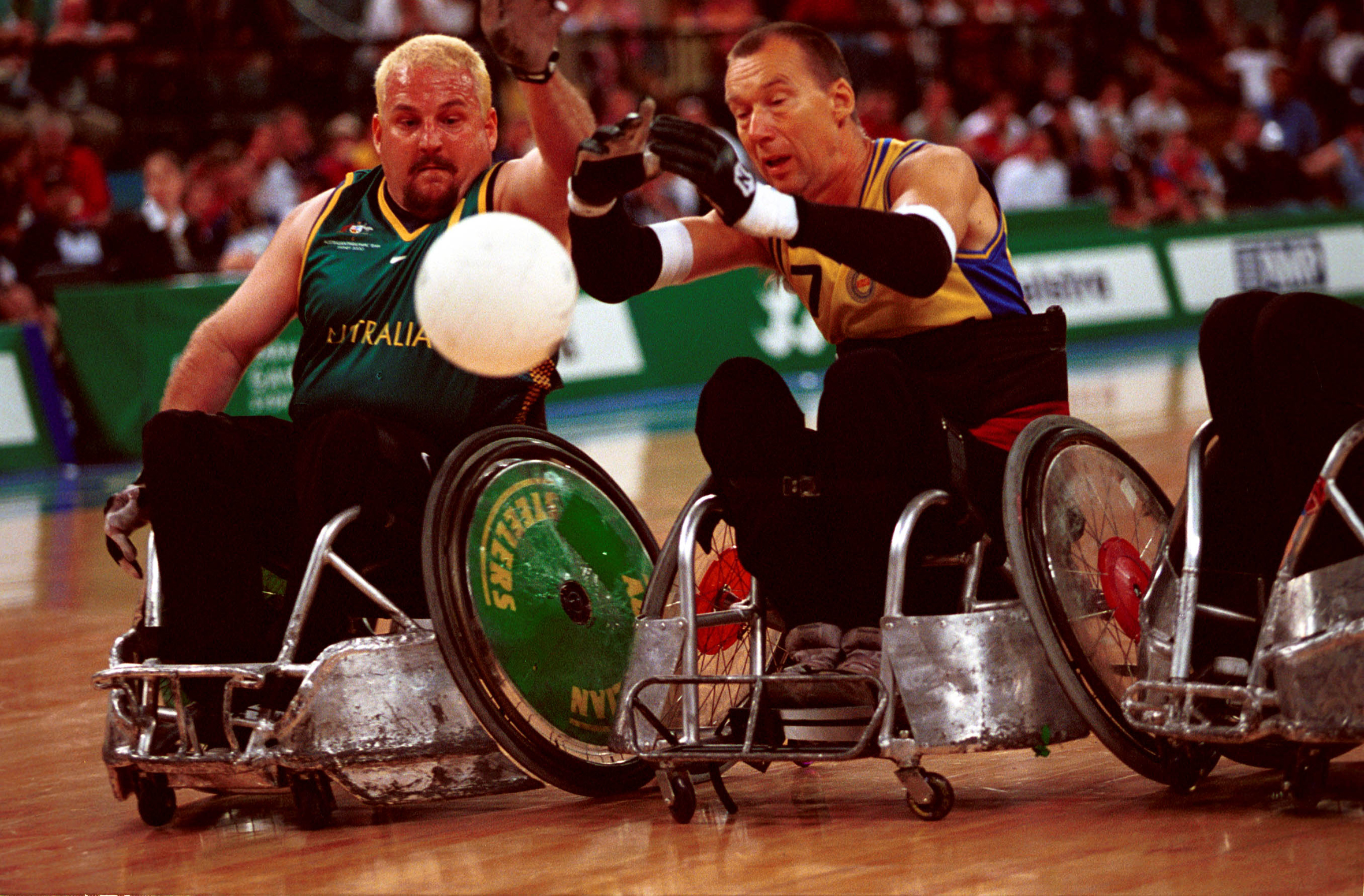
Hucks (left) chases the ball during a match at the 2000 Summer Paralympics

George Hucks (born 18 January 1968) is an Australian wheelchair rugby player. Born in the South Australian town of Port Augusta, he took up wheelchair rugby in 1994 and began playing for the Australian Steelers in 1995. During a practice in Atlanta before the 1996 Summer Paralympics, Hucks, the team's best player, broke his kneecap. He was part of the national team at the 2000 Sydney, 2004 Athens, and 2008 Beijing Paralympics, and won silver medals at the 2000 and 2008 games with the team. He works as a funds officer.
