= Garry Croker =

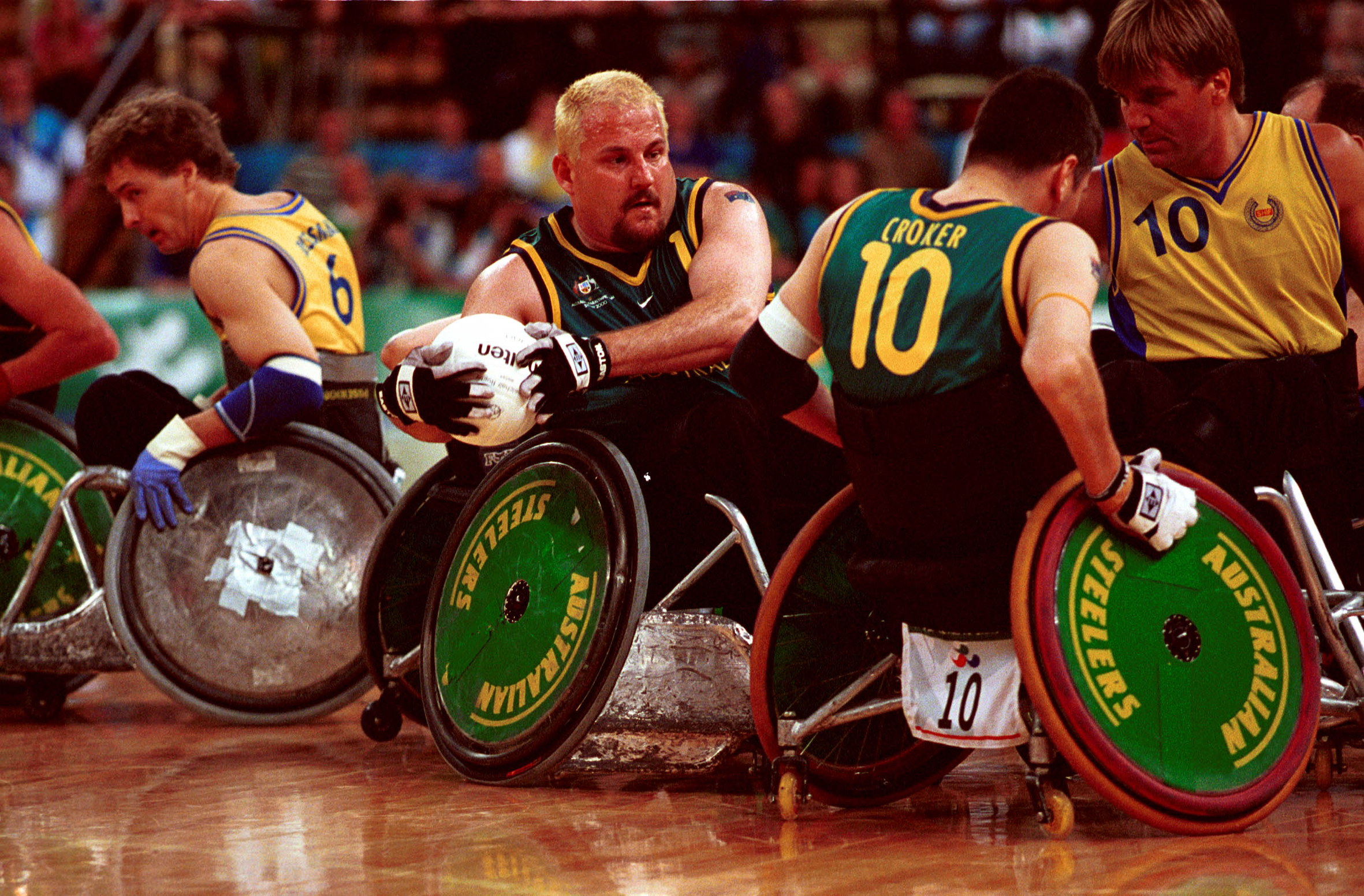
- Garry Croker (#10) blocks an opponent during a wheelchair rugby game at the 2000 Paralympics.

Personal information
- Nationality: Australia
- Born: 2 November 1964 (age 61) Cowra, New South Wales
Medal record
Wheelchair rugby
Paralympic Games
Silver medal – second place	2000 Sydney	Mixed

Garry Croker (born 2 November 1964) is an Australian Paralympic wheelchair rugby and table tennis player. He was born in Cowra, New South Wales. He participated in table tennis at the 1984 Paralympics and the 1988 Seoul Paralympics. He was part of the Australia national wheelchair rugby team at the 1996 Atlanta and 2000 Sydney Paralympics, winning a silver medal with the team in the latter competition.

After his Paralympic career finished, Croker took up handcycling and competed in triathlons. In April 2017, he was banned from racing in the Canberra Times Running Festival half marathon due to his inability to complete the course under 60 minutes. Croker commented that "the time was unattainable, as it was faster than the world record for his class".
