= Daryl Stubel =

Canadian Paralympic athlete

Personal information
- Nationality: Canadian
- Born: 3 September 1965 (age 60) Regina, Saskatchewan

Sport
- Sport: Athletics; Wheelchair rugby
Medal record
Representing Canada
Paralympic Games
Athletics
Silver medal – second place	1988 Seoul	Men's 400 m 1B

Daryl Stubel (born 3 September 1965 in Regina, Saskatchewan) is a Canadian Paralympic athlete. He competed in the 1988 Summer Paralympics in athletics and the 1996 and 2000 Summer Paralympics in wheelchair rugby. In the 1988 Paralympics, he won a silver medal in the men's 400 metres.
