= Grant Sharman =

New Zealand wheelchair rugby player

Medal record

Wheelchair rugby

Representing New Zealand

Paralympic Games
Bronze medal – third place	2000 Sydney	Mixed team

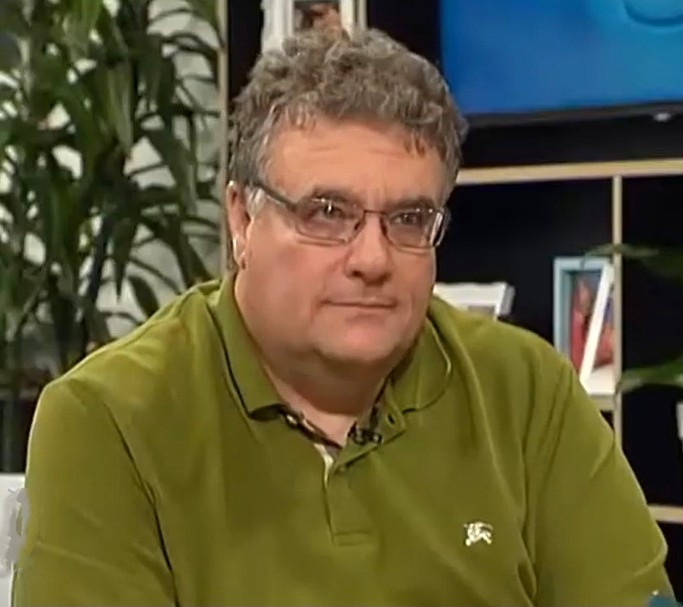
Sharman in 2017

Grant Sharman is a wheelchair rugby player from New Zealand. He is also a member of the national team, the Wheel Blacks.

Sharman was part of the wheel blacks team that competed in the 2000 Summer Paralympics where they won the bronze medal.
