= New Zealand men's national wheelchair basketball team =

New Zealand wheelchair basketball team

New Zealand
- IWBF zone: IWBF Asia+Oceania
- National federation: Wheelchair Basketball New Zealand
- Coach: Glenn McDonald

Paralympic Games
- Appearances: 0

World Championships
- Appearances: 0

The New Zealand men's national wheelchair basketball team known as the Roller Blacks is the wheelchair basketball team that represents New Zealand in international competitions for men as part of the International Wheelchair Basketball Federation.

== Current roster ==
The team's current roster is:

Head coach: Glenn McDonald (New Zealand)

Assistant Coach: Daniella Egle-Bast (New Zealand) / (Germany)

Assistant Coach: Connor Gibbs (New Zealand)

Manager: Pauline Cant (New Zealand)

#	Name	Class.
0	Luke McDowall	2.5
3	Wayne Chase	2.0
6	Travis Moffat	1.0
7	Panchpreet Dhillon	2.5
9	Kauri Murray	4.0
11	Ricardo Gozon	4.0
12	Tyler Belcher	3.0
13	Jaimie Tapp	1.0
18	Nikia Fa'atau	4.0
33	Sage Vaughters	2.5
14	Eamon Wood	2.0

== Competitions ==
The New Zealand men's team has not competed at the Wheelchair Basketball World Championship or at the Summer Paralympics.

=== Wheelchair Basketball World Championship ===
==== Asia Oceania Zone ====
Year	Position	W	L
(South Korea) 2011	6th		
(Thailand) 2013			
(Japan) 2015	DNC		
(China) 2017	11th		
(Thailand) 2024	11th		
