= Patrick Ryan (wheelchair rugby) =

Australian wheelchair rugby union player

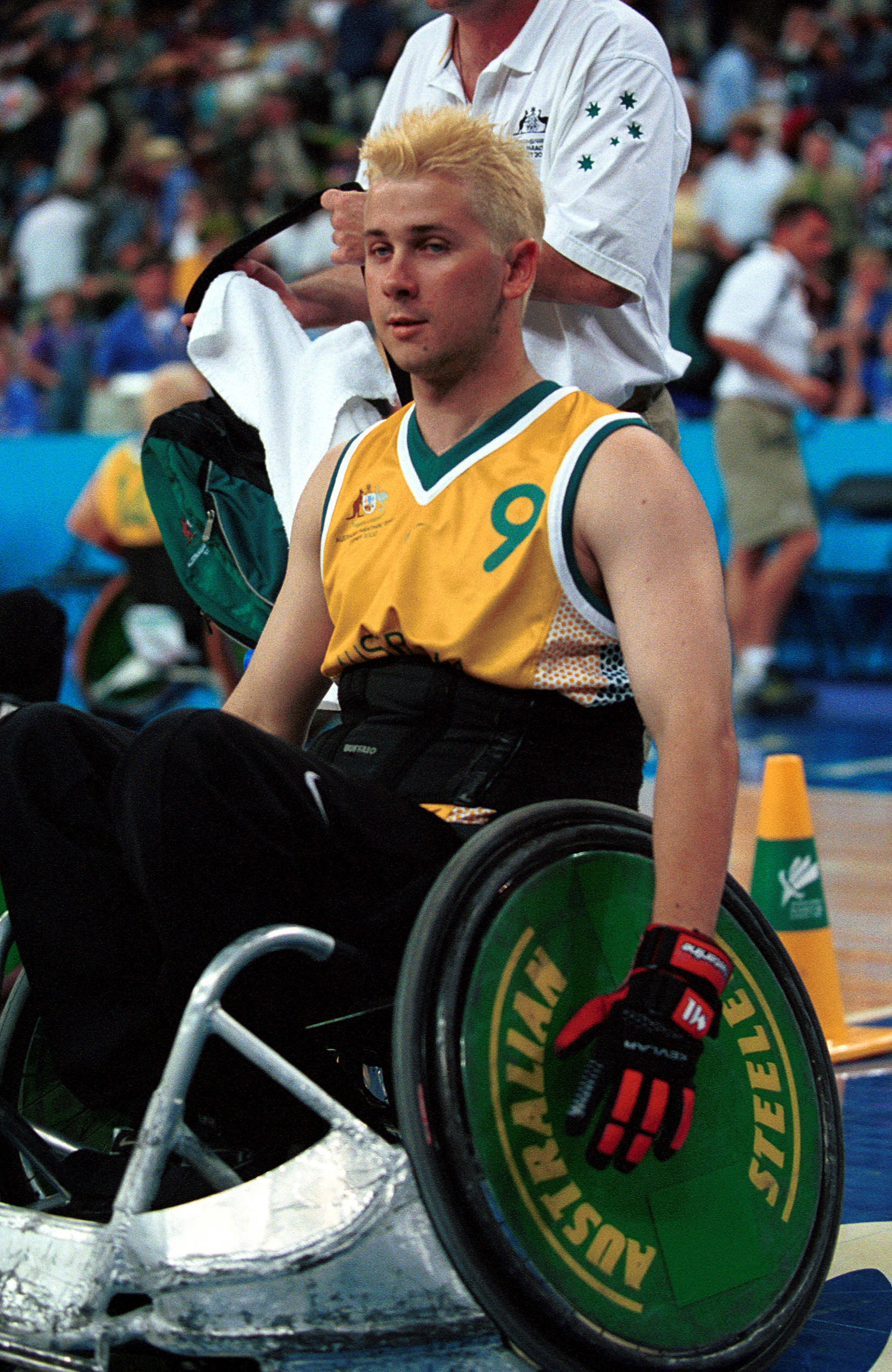
- Ryan relaxes post match at the 2000 Summer Paralympics

Personal information
- Nationality: Australia
- Born: 13 May 1981 (age 45) Brisbane, Queensland
Medal record
Wheelchair rugby
Paralympic Games
Silver medal – second place	2000 Sydney	Mixed

Patrick Ryan (born 13 May 1981) is a Paralympic wheelchair rugby union player from Australia. He was born in Brisbane, Queensland. He won a silver medal at the 2000 Sydney Games in the mixed wheelchair rugby event.
