= Sholto Taylor =

New Zealand wheelchair rugby player

Personal information
- Born: 1 September 1972 (age 53)
Medal record
Wheelchair rugby
Representing New Zealand
Paralympic Games
Gold medal – first place	2004 Athens	Mixed team
Bronze medal – third place	1996 Atlanta	Mixed team
Bronze medal – third place	2000 Sydney	Mixed team
World Championships
Silver medal – second place	2006 Christchurch	Team

Sholto Taylor (born 1 September 1972) is a New Zealand wheelchair rugby player, and a member of the national team, the Wheel Blacks.

He has competed with the Wheel Blacks at several international events, including the 1996 Summer Paralympics, the 2000 Summer Paralympics (winning bronze), the 2004 Summer Paralympics (gold), and the 2006 World Championships (silver). Taylor was the flagbearer of New Zealand's delegation at the Opening Ceremony of the 2008 Paralympics. His team finished in fifth place at those games.
