= Stephen Guthrie =

New Zealand wheelchair rugby player

Medal record

Wheelchair rugby

Representing New Zealand

Paralympic Games
Gold medal – first place	2004 Athens	Mixed team
Bronze medal – third place	2000 Sydney	Mixed team

Stephen Guthrie is a wheelchair rugby player from New Zealand, and a member of the national team, the Wheel Blacks.

Stephen was part of the wheel blacks at three consecutive Paralympics. His first appearance was in 1996 when wheelchair rugby was a demonstration event and the New Zealand team finished in fourth place, four years later in 2000 he was part of the team that went one better and won the bronze medal. His final appearance was in the 2004 Summer Paralympics where the wheel blacks displace the American team to win the gold medal.
