= Brett Boylan =

Australian wheelchair rugby player

Personal information
- Nationality: Australia
- Born: 26 January 1971 (age 55) Sydney, New South Wales
Medal record
Wheelchair rugby
Paralympic Games
Silver medal – second place	2000 Sydney	Mixed

Brett Boylan (born 26 January 1971) is an Australian Paralympic wheelchair rugby player. He was born in Sydney, New South Wales. He participated in the Australian Stealers at the 1996, 2000 Sydney, and 2004 Athens Paralympics, winning a silver medal with the team in 2000.
