= Steve Porter (wheelchair rugby) =

Australian wheelchair rugby player

Personal information
- Nationality: Australia
- Born: 22 November 1969 (age 56) Denmark, South Australia
Medal record
Wheelchair rugby
Paralympic Games
Silver medal – second place	2000 Sydney	Mixed
Silver medal – second place	2008 Beijing	Mixed

Steve Porter (born 22 November 1969) is a Paralympic wheelchair rugby union player from Australia. He was born in Denmark, South Australia. He won silver medals at the 2000 Sydney Games and 2008 Beijing Games in the mixed wheelchair rugby event.
