= Geremy Tinker =

New Zealand wheelchair rugby player

Medal record

Wheelchair rugby

Representing New Zealand

Paralympic Games
Gold medal – first place	2004 Athens	Mixed team
Bronze medal – third place	2000 Sydney	Mixed team

Geremy Tinker is a wheelchair rugby player from New Zealand, and a member of the national team, the Wheel Blacks.

Geremy was a part of the wheel blacks at the first four Paralympic games wheelchair rugby tournaments from its beginnings in 1996 as a demonstration event through to the 2008 Summer Paralympics. In that time he has won a gold medal in 2004 and a bronze in 2000
