= Gary McMurray =

New Zealand wheelchair rugby player

Medal record

Wheelchair rugby

Representing New Zealand

Paralympic Games
Gold medal – first place	2004 Athens	Mixed team
Bronze medal – third place	2000 Sydney	Mixed team

Gary McMurray is a wheelchair rugby player from New Zealand, and a member of the national team, the Wheel Blacks.

Gary was a member of the wheel blacks at the inaugural Paralympic wheelchair rugby tournament in 1996 Summer Paralympics where it was a demonstration event. He remained a part of the team for the next two paralympics where the team won bronze in 2000 and the gold medal in 2004.
