= Curtis Palmer =

New Zealand wheelchair rugby player (born 1977)

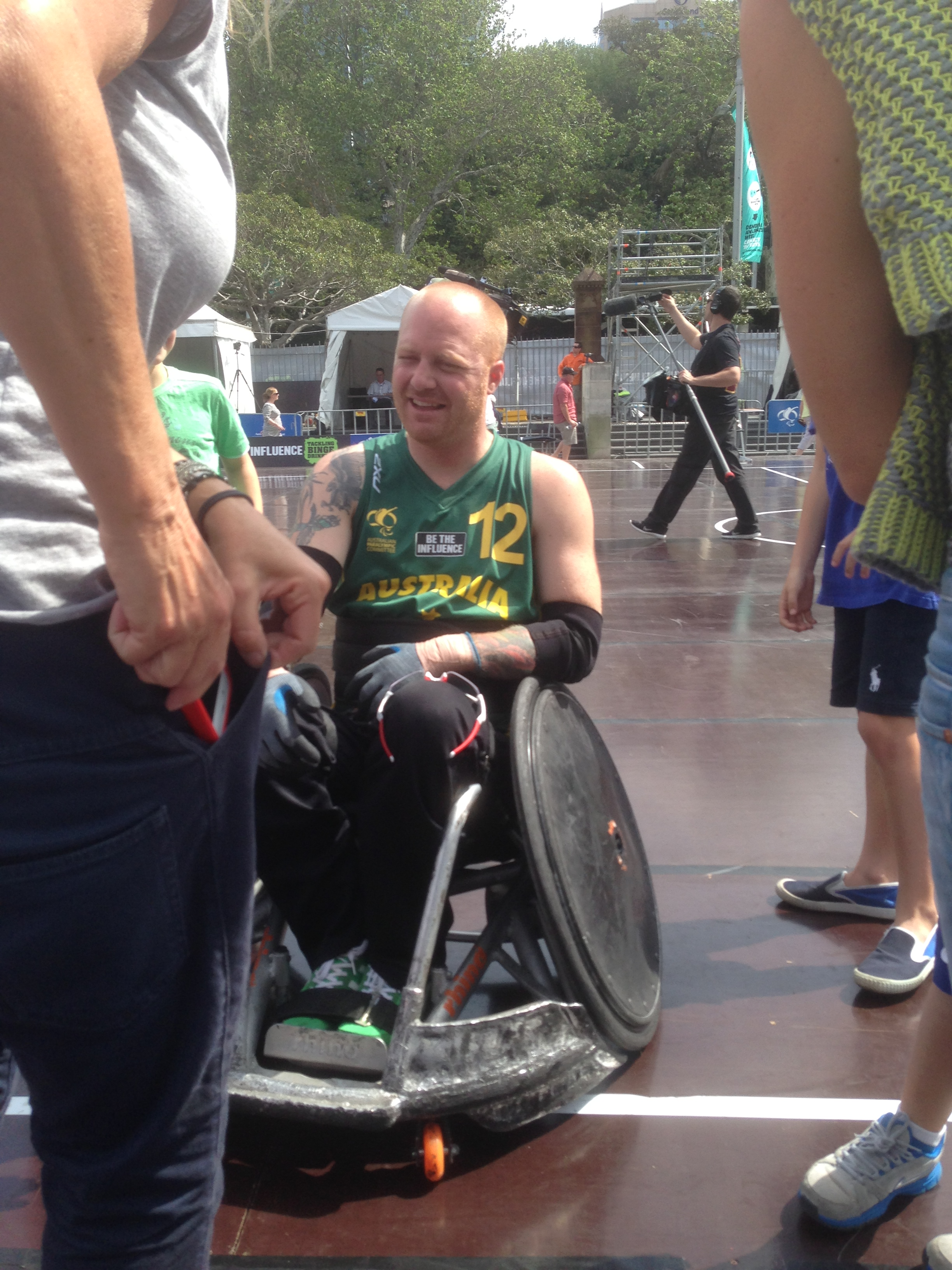
- 2013 Tri-Nations

Personal information
- Nationality: Australia
- Born: 8 May 1977 (age 49) New Zealand
Medal record
Wheelchair rugby
Representing New Zealand
Paralympic Games
Gold medal – first place	2004 Athens	Mixed team
Bronze medal – third place	2000 Sydney	Mixed team
Representing Australia
World Championships
Gold medal – first place	2014 Odense	Mixed team

Curtis Palmer (born 8 May 1977) is a New Zealand-born wheelchair rugby player who initially played for the New Zealand national team Wheel Blacks. In 2013 he switched to play for the Australia national wheelchair rugby team.

Palmer was a part of the Wheel Blacks at each of the first four Paralympic games wheelchair rugby tournament from its beginnings in 1996 as a demonstration event through to the 2008 Summer Paralympics. In that time he has won a gold medal in 2004 and a bronze in 2000 . The Wheel Blacks did not qualify for the 2012 Summer Paralympics.

Palmer played for Australia against the Wheel Blacks in the 2013 Tri-Nations competition held in Sydney. He was a member of the Australian team that won its first world championship gold medal at the 2014 World Wheelchair Rugby Championships at Odense, Denmark.

In addition to his wheelchair rugby playing career, Curtis has been a journalist and TV presenter, and is currently a coach and motivational speaker. He has also authored a book about his life's journey.

== Early days ==
Curtis Palmer was born on 8 May 1977. After his family moved to Australia when Curtis was young he grew up on Sydney's northern beaches and played rugby league in the Manly Warringah District Junior Rugby League. He played junior representative football for the Manly-Warringah Sea Eagles and New South Wales Rugby League. He was injured in a rugby league game in Manly in 1992 at the age of fifteen and became a quadriplegic. The following year he embarked on his wheelchair rugby career which has taken him to four Paralympic Games.
