= Wheel Blacks =

New Zealand NZL
- IWRF Ranking: 9th
- IWRF Zone: IWRF Asia-Oceania
- National Federation: New Zealand Wheelchair Rugby Association
- Coach: (New Zealand) Greg Mitchell

Paralympic Games
- Appearances: 4
- Medals: Gold: 2004; Bronze: 1996, 2000

World Championships
- Appearances: 7
- Medals: (silver) Silver: 1998, 2006; (bronze) Bronze: 1995

IWRF Asia-Oceania Championship
- Appearances: 10
- Medals: (gold) Gold: 2005; (silver) Silver: 2001, 2003, 2009; (bronze) Bronze: 2007, 2011, 2013, 2015, 2017, 2019, 2023

Uniforms
| Light | Dark |

The Wheel Blacks are the national wheelchair rugby team of New Zealand. The team won the gold medal at the 2004 Paralympic games in Athens.

The Wheel Blacks squad is made up from players from different regions around New Zealand. They include Auckland, Waikato, Bay Of Plenty, Manawatu, Wellington, Canterbury, Otago. The Wheel Blacks name is one of many national team nicknames related to the All Blacks.

== 2022 World Championships ==
The Wheel Blacks placed 8th in the 2022 Wheelchair Rugby World Championships in Denmark. The competition was fierce and in a state of rebuilding 8th place is a good result for the Wheelblacks.

The tournament team consisted of: Cameron Leslie (Co-Captain), Ian Simpson, Gareth Lynch, Cody Everson (Co-Captain), Rob Hewitt (Coach), Maia Marshall-Amai, Gavin Rolton (Coach), Nafi Lefono, Hayden Barton-Cootes.

== Tokyo 2020 Paralympic Games ==
The Wheel Blacks qualified for the 2020 Paralympic Games in Japan by winning the bronze medal at the 2019 IWRF Asia-Oceania Championship in South Korea. The team consisted of.

| Player | Classification |
|---|---|
| Gavin Rolton | 0.5 |
| Cody Everson | 1 |
| Gareth Lynch | 1 |
| Mike Todd | 2 |
| Rob Hewitt | 2 |
| Tainafi Lefono | 2 |
| Maia Marshall-Amai | 2.5 |
| Cameron Leslie | 2.5 |
| Hayden Barton-Coates | 3 |
