= Swimming at the 2008 Summer Paralympics – Women's 100 metre freestyle S9 =

Women's 100m Freestyle S9 at the XIII Paralympic Games
- Venue: Beijing National Aquatics Center
- Dates: 8 September
- Competitors: 20 from 12 nations
- Winning time: 1:01.44

Medalists
1st place, gold medalist(s)		Natalie du Toit	South Africa
2nd place, silver medalist(s)		Louise Watkin	Great Britain
3rd place, bronze medalist(s)		Stephanie Dixon	Canada

The women's 100m freestyle S9 event at the 2008 Summer Paralympics took place at the Beijing National Aquatics Center on 8 September. There were three heats; the swimmers with the eight fastest times advanced to the final.

== Results ==
=== Heats ===
Competed from 11:07.

==== Heat 1 ====
Rank	Name	Nationality	Time	Notes
1	Ellie Cole	Australia	1:05.11	Q
2	Darda Sales	Canada	1:05.66	Q
3	Stephanie Dixon	Canada	1:06.03	Q
4	Lauren Steadman	Great Britain	1:08.46	
5	Melissa Stockwell	United States	1:09.55	
6	Wang Qian	China	1:09.59	

==== Heat 2 ====
Rank	Name	Nationality	Time	Notes
1	Louise Watkin	Great Britain	1:04.91	Q
2	April Kerley	United States	1:06.30	
3	Christiane Reppe	Germany	1:06.67	
4	Irina Grazhdanova	Russia	1:06.78	
5	Amanda Drennan	Australia	1:06.81	
6	Emilie Gral	France	1:07.36	
7	Paulina Wozniak	Poland	1:10.24	

==== Heat 3 ====
Rank	Name	Nationality	Time	Notes
1	Natalie du Toit	South Africa	1:02.19	Q, PR
2	Stephanie Millward	Great Britain	1:05.05	Q
3	Elizabeth Stone	United States	1:05.06	Q
4	Annabelle Williams	Australia	1:05.71	Q
5	Mendy Meenderink	Netherlands	1:06.85	
6	Francesca Secci	Italy	1:09.15	
7	Eztitxu Vivanco	France	1:09.81	

=== Final ===
Competed at 20:27.

Rank	Name	Nationality	Time	Notes
1st place, gold medalist(s)	Natalie du Toit	South Africa	1:01.44	PR
2nd place, silver medalist(s)	Louise Watkin	Great Britain	1:03.85	
3rd place, bronze medalist(s)	Stephanie Dixon	Canada	1:03.89	
4	Ellie Cole	Australia	1:04.24	
5	Stephanie Millward	Great Britain	1:04.52	
6	Elizabeth Stone	United States	1:04.86	
7	Annabelle Williams	Australia	1:05.43	
8	Darda Sales	Canada	1:05.65	

Q = qualified for final. PR = Paralympic Record.
