= Swimming at the 2012 Summer Paralympics – Women's 100 metre butterfly S9 =

Women's 100m Butterfly S9 at the XIV Paralympic Games
- Venue: London Aquatics Centre
- Dates: 30 August
- Competitors: 12 from 11 nations
- Winning time: 1:09.30

Medalists
| 1st place, gold medalist(s) | | Natalie du Toit | South Africa |
| 2nd place, silver medalist(s) | | Sarai Gascón Moreno | Spain |
| 3rd place, bronze medalist(s) | | Elizabeth Stone | United States |

The women's 100m butterfly S9 event at the 2012 Summer Paralympics took place at the London Aquatics Centre on 30 August. There were two heats; the swimmers with the eight fastest times advanced to the final.

== Results ==
=== Heats ===
Competed from 11:06.

==== Heat 1 ====
| Rank | Lane | Name | Nationality | Time | Notes |
|---|---|---|---|---|---|
| 1 | 3 | Elizabeth Stone | United States | 1:11.19 | Q |
| 2 | 4 | Sarai Gascón Moreno | Spain | 1:11.45 | Q |
| 3 | 5 | Stephanie Millward | Great Britain | 1:12.32 | Q |
| 4 | 6 | Ellen Keane | Ireland | 1:13.15 | Q |
| 5 | 2 | Cai Yuqingyan | China | 1:15.79 | |
| 6 | 7 | Shanntol Ince | Trinidad and Tobago | 1:25.50 | |

==== Heat 2 ====
| Rank | Lane | Name | Nationality | Time | Notes |
|---|---|---|---|---|---|
| 1 | 4 | Natalie du Toit | South Africa | 1:09.94 | Q |
| 2 | 6 | Claire Cashmore | Great Britain | 1:13.26 | Q |
| 3 | 2 | Paulina Wozniak | Poland | 1:13.56 | Q |
| 4 | 5 | Ellie Cole | Australia | 1:14.37 | Q |
| 5 | 3 | Irina Grazhdanova | Russia | 1:14.50 | |
| 6 | 7 | Katarina Roxon | Canada | 1:18.61 | |

=== Final ===
Competed at 19:30.

| Rank | Lane | Name | Nationality | Time | Notes |
|---|---|---|---|---|---|
| 1st place, gold medalist(s) | 4 | Natalie du Toit | South Africa | 1:09.30 | |
| 2nd place, silver medalist(s) | 3 | Sarai Gascón Moreno | Spain | 1:09.79 | EU |
| 3rd place, bronze medalist(s) | 5 | Elizabeth Stone | United States | 1:10.10 | AM |
| 4 | 8 | Ellie Cole | Australia | 1:10.40 | OC |
| 5 | 6 | Stephanie Millward | Great Britain | 1:12.01 | |
| 6 | 1 | Paulina Wozniak | Poland | 1:12.52 | |
| 7 | 2 | Ellen Keane | Ireland | 1:14.04 | |
| 8 | 7 | Claire Cashmore | Great Britain | 1:14.56 | |

'Q = qualified for final. AM = Americas Record. EU = European Record. OC = Oceania Record.
