= Swimming at the 2008 Summer Paralympics – Women's 200 metre individual medley SM9 =

Women's 200m Individual Medley SM9 at the XIII Paralympic Games
- Venue: Beijing National Aquatics Center
- Dates: 11 September
- Competitors: 16 from 11 nations
- Winning time: 2:27.83

Medalists
1st place, gold medalist(s)		Natalie du Toit	South Africa
2nd place, silver medalist(s)		Stephanie Dixon	Canada
3rd place, bronze medalist(s)		Louise Watkin	Great Britain

The women's 200m individual medley SM9 event at the 2008 Summer Paralympics took place at the Beijing National Aquatics Center on 11 September. There were two heats; the swimmers with the eight fastest times advanced to the final.

== Results ==
=== Heats ===
Competed from 10:21.

==== Heat 1 ====
Rank	Name	Nationality	Time	Notes
1	Louise Watkin	Great Britain	2:42.08	Q
2	Emilie Gral	France	2:44.82	Q
3	Brittany Gray	Canada	2:46.58	Q
4	Sarai Gascón Moreno	Spain	2:46.93	
5	Kate Grey	Great Britain	2:48.15	
6	Daniela Gimenez	Argentina	2:55.29	
7	Katarina Roxon	Canada	2:55.75	
8	Irina Grazhdanova	Russia	2:58.11	

==== Heat 2 ====
Rank	Name	Nationality	Time	Notes
1	Natalie du Toit	South Africa	2:30.13	Q
2	Stephanie Dixon	Canada	2:40.01	Q
3	Claire Cashmore	Great Britain	2:42.11	Q
4	Ellie Cole	Australia	2:42.26	Q
5	Paulina Wozniak	Poland	2:45.33	Q
6	Ellen Keane	Ireland	2:47.35	
7	Joana Calado	Portugal	2:52.52	
8	Ester Rodriguez	Spain	2:55.93	

=== Final ===
Competed at 18:26.

Rank	Name	Nationality	Time	Notes
1st place, gold medalist(s)	Natalie du Toit	South Africa	2:27.83	WR
2nd place, silver medalist(s)	Stephanie Dixon	Canada	2:37.54	
3rd place, bronze medalist(s)	Louise Watkin	Great Britain	2:40.31	
4	Claire Cashmore	Great Britain	2:42.09	
5	Emilie Gral	France	2:42.48	
6	Brittany Gray	Canada	2:45.49	
7	Paulina Wozniak	Poland	2:46.14	
	Ellie Cole	Australia	DNS	

Q = qualified for final. WR = World Record. DNS = did not start.
