= Swimming at the 2008 Summer Paralympics – Women's 100 metre backstroke S9 =

Women's 100m Backstroke S9 at the XIII Paralympic Games
- Venue: Beijing National Aquatics Center
- Dates: 13 September
- Competitors: 13 from 8 nations
- Winning time: 1:09.30

Medalists
1st place, gold medalist(s)		Stephanie Dixon	Canada
2nd place, silver medalist(s)		Elizabeth Stone	United States
3rd place, bronze medalist(s)		Ellie Cole	Australia

The women's 100m backstroke S9 event at the 2008 Summer Paralympics took place at the Beijing National Aquatics Center on 13 September. There were two heats; the swimmers with the eight fastest times advanced to the final.

== Results ==
=== Heats ===
Competed from 09:45.

==== Heat 1 ====
Rank	Name	Nationality	Time	Notes
1	Ellie Cole	Australia	1:13.12	Q
2	Elizabeth Stone	United States	1:13.52	Q
3	Emilie Gral	France	1:16.06	Q
4	Eztitxu Vivanco	France	1:17.28	
5	Christiane Reppe	Germany	1:19.12	
6	Emily Gray	South Africa	1:20.01	

==== Heat 2 ====
Rank	Name	Nationality	Time	Notes
1	Stephanie Dixon	Canada	1:10.85	Q
2	Stephanie Millward	Great Britain	1:12.34	Q
3	Claire Cashmore	Great Britain	1:14.47	Q
4	Lizzie Simpkin	Great Britain	1:15.65	Q
5	Darda Sales	Canada	1:16.26	Q
6	Amanda Drennan	Australia	1:17.06	
7	Dun Longjuan	China	1:18.69	

=== Final ===
Competed at 18:08.

Rank	Name	Nationality	Time	Notes
1st place, gold medalist(s)	Stephanie Dixon	Canada	1:09.30	WR
2nd place, silver medalist(s)	Elizabeth Stone	United States	1:11.16	
3rd place, bronze medalist(s)	Ellie Cole	Australia	1:11.87	
4	Stephanie Millward	Great Britain	1:14.13	
5	Lizzie Simpkin	Great Britain	1:14.38	
6	Claire Cashmore	Great Britain	1:14.46	
7	Darda Sales	Canada	1:15.91	
8	Emilie Gral	France	1:16.42	

Q = qualified for final. WR = World Record.
