= Swimming at the 2012 Summer Paralympics – Women's 100 metre freestyle S9 =

Women's 100m Freestyle S9 at the XIV Paralympic Games
- Venue: London Aquatics Centre
- Dates: 7 September
- Competitors: 13 from 9 nations
- Winning time: 1:02.77

Medalists
1st place, gold medalist(s)		Ellie Cole	Australia
2nd place, silver medalist(s)		Natalie du Toit	South Africa
3rd place, bronze medalist(s)		Sarai Gascón Moreno	Spain

The women's 100m freestyle S9 event at the 2012 Summer Paralympics took place at the London Aquatics Centre on 7 September. There were two heats; the swimmers with the eight fastest times advanced to the final.

== Results ==
=== Heats ===
Competed from 09:40.

==== Heat 1 ====
Rank	Lane	Name	Nationality	Time	Notes
1	5	Louise Watkin	Great Britain	1:04.63	Q
2	4	Sarai Gascón Moreno	Spain	1:04.93	Q
3	6	Annabelle Williams	Australia	1:05.47	Q
4	2	Lauren Steadman	Great Britain	1:05.98	Q
5	3	Claire Cashmore	Great Britain	1:06.81	
6	7	Emily Gray	South Africa	1:08.81	

==== Heat 2 ====
Rank	Lane	Name	Nationality	Time	Notes
1	4	Natalie du Toit	South Africa	1:02.95	Q
2	5	Ellie Cole	Australia	1:04.58	Q
3	2	Lin Ping	China	1:05.55	Q, AS
4	6	Elizabeth Stone	United States	1:05.59	Q
5	7	Christiane Reppe	Germany	1:07.09	
6	3	Irina Grazhdanova	Russia	1:08.31	
7	1	Katarina Roxon	Canada	1:08.58	

=== Final ===
Competed at 17:37.

Rank	Lane	Name	Nationality	Time	Notes
1st place, gold medalist(s)	5	Ellie Cole	Australia	1:02.77	OC
2nd place, silver medalist(s)	4	Natalie du Toit	South Africa	1:03.45	
3rd place, bronze medalist(s)	6	Sarai Gascón Moreno	Spain	1:03.62	
4	7	Lin Ping	China	1:04.27	AS
5	3	Louise Watkin	Great Britain	1:04.45	
6	1	Elizabeth Stone	United States	1:05.43	
7	2	Annabelle Williams	Australia	1:05.73	
8	8	Lauren Steadman	Great Britain	1:06.07	

'Q = qualified for final. AS = Asian Record. OC = Oceania Record.
