= Swimming at the 2010 Commonwealth Games – Women's 50 metre freestyle S9 =

The Women's 50 metre backstroke event at the 2010 Commonwealth Games took place on 5 October 2010, at the SPM Swimming Pool Complex.

Two heats were held, with most containing the maximum number of swimmers (eight). The top eight from there qualified for the finals.

== Semifinals ==
=== Semifinal 1 ===
Rank	Lane	Name	Nationality	Time	Notes
1	4	Natalie du Toit	South Africa	29.82	Q
2	5	Ellie Cole	Australia	31.11	Q
3	3	Shanntol Ince	Trinidad and Tobago	34.30	Q
4	2	Anjani Patel	India	47.64	Q
5	6	Vineeta Pathak	India	52.58	

=== Semifinal 2 ===
Rank	Lane	Name	Nationality	Time	Notes
1	4	Annabelle Williams	Australia	30.03	Q
2	5	Stephanie Millward	England	30.09	Q
3	3	Katarina Roxon	Canada	31.57	Q
4	6	Kiran Tak	India	38.79	Q
5	2	Ann Njeri	Kenya		DSQ

== Final ==
Rank	Lane	Name	Nationality	Time	Notes
1st place, gold medalist(s)	4	Natalie du Toit	South Africa	29.17	CGR
2nd place, silver medalist(s)	5	Annabelle Williams	Australia	29.42	
3rd place, bronze medalist(s)	3	Stephanie Millward	England	29.69	
4	6	Ellie Cole	Australia	30.23	
5	7	Shanntol Ince	Trinidad and Tobago	34.07	
6	2	Katarina Roxon	Canada	34.37	
7	1	Kiran Tak	India	38.74	
8	8	Anjani Patel	India	46.25	
