= Swimming at the 2010 Commonwealth Games – Women's 100 metre freestyle S9 =

Event at the 2010 Commonwealth Games

The Women's 100 metre freestyle S9 event at the 2010 Commonwealth Games took place on 7 October 2010, at the SPM Swimming Pool Complex, Delhi. Natalie du Toit of South Africa created a Games Record for this event with a time of 1:02.85.

== Records ==
World Record	1:01.10	Natalie du Toit	RSA	Manchester, England	6 May 2008
Games Record	1:02.36	Natalie du Toit	RSA	Delhi, India	7 October 2010

== Heats ==
=== Heat 1 ===
Rank	Lane	Name	Class	Nationality	Time	Notes
1	4	Stephanie Millward	S9	England	1:06.39	Q
2	5	Annabelle Josephine Williams	S9	Australia	1:07.25	Q
3	3	Shanntol Ince	S9	Trinidad and Tobago	1:14.01	Q
4	2	Anjani Patel	S9	India	1:46.68	q
5	6	Vineeta Pathak	S9	India	1:58.29	

=== Heat 2 ===
Rank	Lane	Name	Class	Nationality	Time	Notes
1	4	Natalie du Toit	S9	South Africa	1:02.85	Q
2	5	Ellie Cole	S9	Australia	1:06.98	Q
3	3	Katarina Mirabelle Roxon	S9	Canada	1:09.94	Q
4	6	Kiran Tak	S9	India	1:27.02	q
5	2	Ann Wacuka Njeri	S9	Kenya	1:57.10	

== Finals ==
Rank	Lane	Name	Class	Nationality	Time	Notes
1st place, gold medalist(s)	4	Natalie du Toit	S9	South Africa	1:02.36	GR
2nd place, silver medalist(s)	5	Stephanie Millward	S9	England	1:03.69	
3rd place, bronze medalist(s)	3	Ellie Cole	S9	Australia	1:05.20	
4	6	Annabelle Josephine Williams	S9	Australia	1:05.82	
5	2	Katarina Mirabelle Roxon	S9	Canada	1:09.03	
6	7	Shanntol Ince	S9	Trinidad and Tobago	1:14.00	
7	1	Kiran Tak	S9	India	1:28.34	
8	8	Anjani Patel	S9	India	1:48.11	
