= Swimming at the 2012 Summer Paralympics – Women's 100 metre backstroke S9 =

Women's 100 metre backstroke S9 at the XIV Paralympic Games
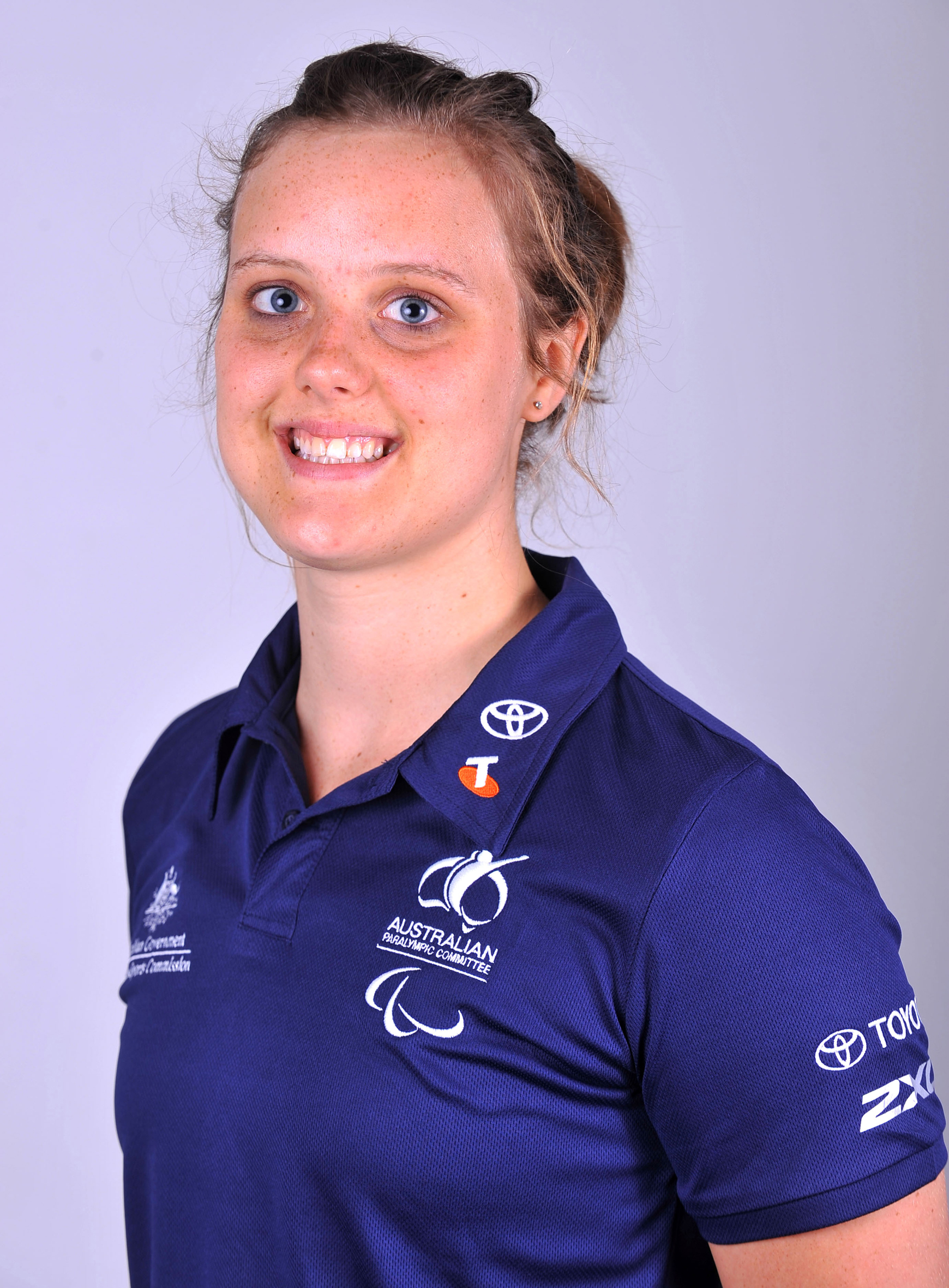
- Gold medallist Ellie Cole
- Venue: London Aquatics Centre
- Dates: 31 August
- Competitors: 10 from 7 nations

Medalists
1st place, gold medalist(s)		Ellie Cole	Australia
2nd place, silver medalist(s)		Stephanie Millward	Great Britain
3rd place, bronze medalist(s)		Elizabeth Stone	United States

The women's 100 metre backstroke S9 event at the 2012 Paralympic Games took place on 31 August, at the London Aquatics Centre in the Olympic Park, London. The event was for athletes included in the S9 classification, which is for competitors with physical impairments. Ten swimmers took part, representing a total of seven different nations. Australia's Ellie Cole won the gold medal.

== Results ==
Key

- Q Qualified for next round
- AS = Asian record
- OC = Oceania record

=== Heats ===
Two heats were held, each with five swimmers; the swimmers with the eight fastest times advanced to the final. The heats took place on 31 August starting at 10:38 BST.

==== Heat 1 ====
Rank	Lane	Name	Nationality	Time	Notes
1	4	Ellie Cole	Australia	1:10.74	Q
2	5	Elizabeth Stone	United States	1:13.28	Q
3	3	Longjuan Dun	China	1:14.99	Q, AS
4	6	Emily Gray	South Africa	1:15.59	Q
5	2	Shanntol Ince	Trinidad and Tobago	1:22.14	

==== Heat 2 ====
Rank	Lane	Name	Nationality	Time	Notes
1	5	Stephanie Millward	Great Britain	1:10.81	Q
2	4	Natalie du Toit	South Africa	1:12.54	Q
3	3	Amy Marren	Great Britain	1:14.21	Q
4	2	Christiane Reppe	Germany	1:17.55	Q
5	6	Ping Lin	China	1:19.32	

=== Final ===
Australia's Ellie Cole won the gold medal in a time of one minutes, 9.42 seconds, setting a new Oceania record. Great Britain's Stephanie Millward took silver and Elizabeth Stone won bronze. Eleven time Paralympic champion Natalie du Toit finished fourth.

Rank	Lane	Name	Nationality	Time	Notes
1st place, gold medalist(s)	4	Ellie Cole	Australia	1:09.42	OC
2nd place, silver medalist(s)	5	Stephanie Millward	Great Britain	1:11.07	
3rd place, bronze medalist(s)	6	Elizabeth Stone	United States	1:12.28	
4	3	Natalie du Toit	South Africa	1:12.56	
5	2	Amy Marren	Great Britain	1:14.31	
6	7	Longjuan Dun	China	1:15.48	
7	1	Emily Gray	South Africa	1:16.65	
8	8	Christiane Reppe	Germany	1:17.88	
