= Swimming at the 2012 Summer Paralympics – Women's 400 metre freestyle S9 =

Women's 400m Freestyle S9 at the XIV Paralympic Games
- Venue: London Aquatics Centre
- Dates: 4 September
- Competitors: 11 from 8 nations
- Winning time: 4:30.18

Medalists
1st place, gold medalist(s)		Natalie du Toit	South Africa
2nd place, silver medalist(s)		Stephanie Millward	Great Britain
3rd place, bronze medalist(s)		Ellie Cole	Australia

The women's 400m freestyle S9 event at the 2012 Summer Paralympics took place at the London Aquatics Centre on 4 September. There were two heats; the swimmers with the eight fastest times advanced to the final.

== Results ==
=== Heats ===
Competed from 10:19.

==== Heat 1 ====
Rank	Lane	Name	Nationality	Time	Notes
1	4	Stephanie Millward	Great Britain	4:46.00	Q
2	6	Amy Marren	Great Britain	4:53.04	Q
3	3	Elizabeth Stone	United States	4:53.05	Q
4	5	Cai Yuqingyan	China	5:03.12	
5	2	Katarina Roxon	Canada	5:17.03	

==== Heat 2 ====
Rank	Lane	Name	Nationality	Time	Notes
1	4	Natalie du Toit	South Africa	4:32.59	Q
2	5	Ellie Cole	Australia	4:53.01	Q
3	6	Christiane Reppe	Germany	4:55.44	Q
4	2	Lauren Steadman	Great Britain	4:56.23	Q
5	3	Emily Gray	South Africa	5:00.44	Q
6	7	Shanntol Ince	Trinidad and Tobago	5:27.88	

=== Final ===
Competed at 18:10.

Rank	Lane	Name	Nationality	Time	Notes
1st place, gold medalist(s)	4	Natalie du Toit	South Africa	4:30.18	
2nd place, silver medalist(s)	5	Stephanie Millward	Great Britain	4:40.01	EU
3rd place, bronze medalist(s)	3	Ellie Cole	Australia	4:42.87	OC
4	6	Amy Marren	Great Britain	4:50.79	
5	7	Christiane Reppe	Germany	4:53.93	
6	1	Lauren Steadman	Great Britain	4:55.17	
7	8	Emily Gray	South Africa	4:59.77	
8	2	Elizabeth Stone	United States	5:02.76	

'Q = qualified for final. EU = European Record. OC = Oceania Record.
