= Swimming at the 2012 Summer Paralympics – Women's 200 metre individual medley SM9 =

Women's 200m Ind. Medley SM9 at the XIV Paralympic Games
- Venue: London Aquatics Centre
- Dates: 6 September
- Competitors: 11 from 8 nations
- Winning time: 2:34.22

Medalists
| 1st place, gold medalist(s) | | Natalie du Toit | South Africa |
| 2nd place, silver medalist(s) | | Stephanie Millward | Great Britain |
| 3rd place, bronze medalist(s) | | Louise Watkin | Great Britain |

The women's 200m ind. medley SM9 event at the 2012 Summer Paralympics took place at the London Aquatics Centre on 6 September. There were two heats; the swimmers with the eight fastest times advanced to the final.

== Results ==
=== Heats ===
Competed from 09:40.

==== Heat 1 ====
| Rank | Lane | Name | Nationality | Time | Notes |
|---|---|---|---|---|---|
| 1 | 4 | Louise Watkin | Great Britain | 2:39.21 | Q |
| 2 | 5 | Claire Cashmore | Great Britain | 2:39.75 | Q |
| 3 | 6 | Ellen Keane | Ireland | 2:42.00 | Q |
| 4 | 3 | Ellie Cole | Australia | 2:44.31 | |
| 5 | 2 | Katarina Roxon | Canada | 2:51.27 | |

==== Heat 2 ====
| Rank | Lane | Name | Nationality | Time | Notes |
|---|---|---|---|---|---|
| 1 | 4 | Natalie du Toit | South Africa | 2:36.92 | Q |
| 2 | 3 | Stephanie Millward | Great Britain | 2:38.47 | Q |
| 3 | 2 | Anna Johannes | United States | 2:40.08 | Q |
| 4 | 5 | Sarai Gascón Moreno | Spain | 2:42.49 | Q |
| 5 | 6 | Paulina Wozniak | Poland | 2:44.19 | Q |
| 6 | 7 | Emily Gray | South Africa | 2:54.03 | |

=== Final ===
Competed at 17:38.

| Rank | Lane | Name | Nationality | Time | Notes |
|---|---|---|---|---|---|
| 1st place, gold medalist(s) | 4 | Natalie du Toit | South Africa | 2:34.22 | |
| 2nd place, silver medalist(s) | 5 | Stephanie Millward | Great Britain | 2:36.21 | |
| 3rd place, bronze medalist(s) | 3 | Louise Watkin | Great Britain | 2:37.79 | |
| 4 | 6 | Claire Cashmore | Great Britain | 2:38.08 | |
| 5 | 2 | Anna Johannes | United States | 2:39.16 | |
| 6 | 1 | Sarai Gascón Moreno | Spain | 2:40.15 | |
| 7 | 7 | Ellen Keane | Ireland | 2:42.21 | |
| 8 | 8 | Paulina Wozniak | Poland | 2:44.17 | |

'Q = qualified for final.
