= Swimming at the 2010 Commonwealth Games – Women's 100 metre butterfly S9 =

The Women's 100 metre butterfly S9 event at the 2010 Commonwealth Games took place on 9 October 2010, at the SPM Swimming Pool Complex, Delhi. Natalie du Toit of South Africa created a World Record for this event with a time of 1:06.70 in Beijing, China in 2008 Summer Paralympics.

== Finals ==
| Rank | Lane | Name | Class | Nationality | Time | Notes |
|---|---|---|---|---|---|---|
| 1st place, gold medalist(s) | 4 | Natalie du Toit | S9 | South Africa | 1:07.32 | |
| 2nd place, silver medalist(s) | 5 | Stephanie Millward | S9 | England | 1:13.11 | |
| 3rd place, bronze medalist(s) | 6 | Ellie Cole | S9 | Australia | 1:14.04 | |
| 4 | 3 | Annabelle Williams | S9 | Australia | 1:14.07 | |
| 5 | 7 | Katarina Roxon | S9 | Canada | 1:18.84 | |
| 6 | 2 | Shanntol Ince | S9 | Trinidad and Tobago | 1:22.64 | |
| 7 | 1 | Kiran Tak | S9 | India | 1:53.00 | |
