= South Africa at the 2012 Summer Paralympics =

Sporting event delegation

- IPC code: RSA
- NPC: South African Sports Confederation and Olympic Committee
- Website: www.sascoc.co.za

in London
- Competitors: 62 in 7 sports
- Flag bearer: Oscar Pistorius
- Officials: 45
- Medals Ranked 17th: Gold 8 Silver 12 Bronze 9 Total 29

Summer Paralympics appearances (overview)
- 1964; 1968; 1972; 1976; 1980–1988; 1992; 1996; 2000; 2004; 2008; 2012; 2016; 2020; 2024

South Africa competed at the 2012 Summer Paralympics in London with a team of 62 athletes and finished 18th on the medal table.

The South African Sports Confederation and Olympic Committee (SASCOC), which is the National Paralympic Committee of South Africa, announced a team of 62 competitors for the 2012 Paralympics on 20 June 2012. The team of 45 men and 17 women were accompanied by 45 managers, coaches and other support staff. SASCOC released the team's schedule on 17 August 2012.

In a surprise announcement in London on 8 September the South African Minister of Sport and Recreation Fikile Mbalula said that Paralympic medal winners and their coaches would receive the same performance bonuses that their Olympic counterparts were promised. The amounts initially promised were significantly lower. The minister said the original plan was discriminatory.

== Medalists ==
The following South African competitors won medals at the games.

Medal	Name	Sport	Event	Date
Gold	Natalie du Toit	Swimming	Women's 100 m butterfly S9	30 August
Bronze	Hendri Herbst	Swimming	Men's 100 m freestyle S11	31 August
Bronze	Achmat Hassiem	Swimming	Men's 100 m butterfly S10	1 September
Bronze	Jonathan Ntutu	Athletics	Men's 100 m T13	1 September
Silver	Teboho Mokgalagadi	Athletics	Men's 100 m T35	1 September
Gold	Charl Bouwer	Swimming	Men's 50 m freestyle S13	1 September
Silver	Dyan Buis	Athletics	Men's 100 m T38	1 September
Bronze	Anrune Liebenberg	Athletics	Women's 200 m T46	1 September
Silver	Charl Bouwer	Swimming	Men's 100 m freestyle S13	2 September
Silver	Oscar Pistorius	Athletics	Men's 200 m T44	2 September
Silver	Charl Bouwer	Swimming	Men's 100 m backstroke S13	3 September
Bronze	Union Sekailwe	Athletics	Men's 400 m T38	3 September
Bronze	Michael Louwrens	Athletics	Men's shot put F57–58	4 September
Gold	Natalie du Toit	Swimming	Women's 400 m freestyle S9	4 September
Bronze	Shireen Sapiro	Swimming	Women's 100 m backstroke S10	4 September
Bronze	Dyan Buis	Athletics	Men's long jump F37–38	5 September
Gold	Oscar Pistorius; Arnu Fourie; Samkelo Radebe; Zivan Smith	Athletics	4 × 100 m relay T42–46	5 September
Gold	Natalie du Toit	Swimming	Women's 200 m individual medley SM9	6 September
Silver	Hilton Langenhoven	Athletics	Men's 400 m T12	6 September
Silver	Ilse Hayes	Athletics	Women's 100 m T13	6 September
Bronze	Arnu Fourie	Athletics	Men's 100 m T44	6 September
Silver	Natalie du Toit	Swimming	Women's 100 m freestyle S9	7 September
Silver	Ernst van Dyk	Cycling	Men's road race H4	7 September
Gold	Ilse Hayes	Athletics	Women's long jump F13	7 September
Silver	Dyan Buis	Athletics	Men's 200 m T38	8 September
Silver	Kevin Paul	Swimming	Men's 100 m breaststroke SB9	8 September
Gold	Fanie van der Merwe	Athletics	Men's 100 m T37	8 September
Silver	Anrune Liebenberg	Athletics	Women's 400 m T46	8 September
Gold	Oscar Pistorius	Athletics	Men's 400 m T44	8 September

Medals by sport
Sport	Gold medal	Silver medal	Bronze medal	Total
Swimming	4	4	3	11
Athletics	4	7	6	17
Cycling	0	1	0	1
Total	8	12	9	29

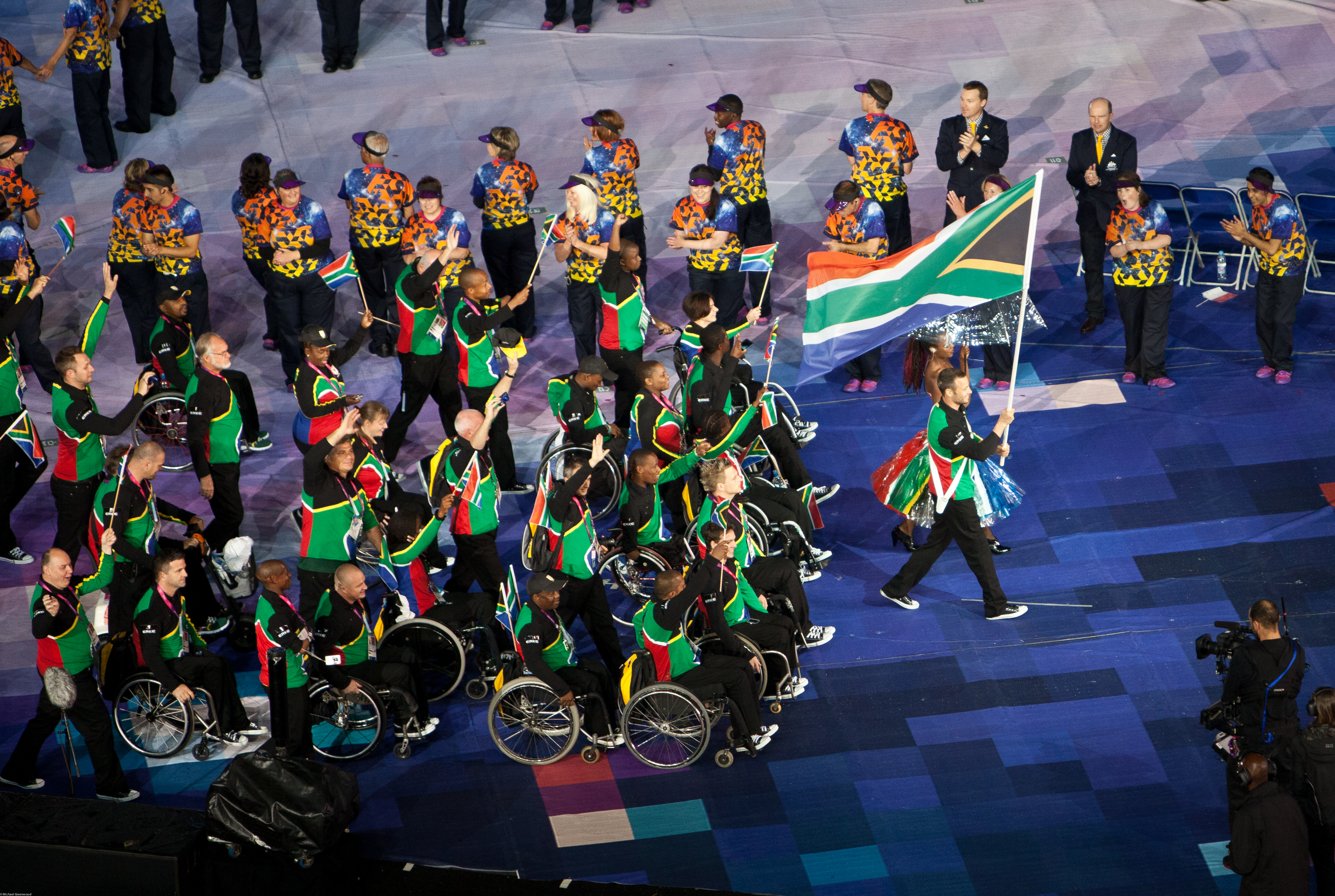
The team enters the stadium during the opening ceremony with Oscar Pistorius carrying the flag

== Athletics ==
South African track and field athletes won a combined 17 medals at the Games, four gold, seven silver and six bronze. Sprinter Oscar Pistorius, who carried the nation's flag at the opening ceremony, was the most successful South African athlete winning individual gold in the T44 400 metres, gold in the 4 × 100 metres relay T42–46, setting world records in both, and individual silver in the T44 200 metres. In the 200 metres event Pistorius set a new world record in his heat, but he was defeated in the final by Brazilian Alan Oliveira. After the race Pistorius raised an issue about the length of Oliveira's blades, he later apologised for the timing of his remarks, but not the content of his complaint. The IPC confirmed the length of Oliveira's blades were proportional to his body and legal, but expressed willingness to engage with Pistorius about the issue.

Key

- Note–Ranks given for preliminary rounds are within the athlete's heat only
- Q = Qualified for the next round
- q = Qualified for the next round as a fastest loser or by position without achieving the qualifying target
- AF = African record
- NR = National record
- SB = Seasonal Best
- PB = Personal Best
- N/A = Round not applicable for the event
- Bye = Athlete not required to compete in round
- DNS = Did not start/Withdrawn

Men—track

Athlete	Events	Heat		Semifinal		Final	
Athlete	Events	Time	Rank	Time	Rank	Time	Rank
Tshepo Bhebe	400 m T46	52.24	5	—N/a		did not advance	
Dyan Buis	100 m T38	—N/a				11.11 AF	2nd place, silver medalist(s)
Dyan Buis	200 m T38	22.57 AF	1 Q	—N/a		22.51 AF	2nd place, silver medalist(s)
Andrea Dalle Ave	100 m T37	12.18 PB	=7	—N/a		did not advance	
Pieter du Preez	100 m T51	—N/a				24.21	6
Charl du Toit	100 m T37	12.11	5	—N/a		did not advance	
Charl du Toit	800 m T37	—N/a				2:06.67	6
Arnu Fourie	100 m T44	11.29	1 Q	—N/a		11.08 AF	3rd place, bronze medalist(s)
Arnu Fourie	200 m T44	22.57 WR	2 Q	—N/a		22.49 WR	4
Hilton Langenhoven	200 m T12	22.44 SB	1 Q	22.24 PB	1 Q	22.29	4
Hilton Langenhoven	400 m T12	49.86	1 Q	49.42 =PB	1 Q	49.04 PB	2nd place, silver medalist(s)
Teboho Mokgalagadi	100 m T35	13.07	2 Q	—N/a		13.10	2nd place, silver medalist(s)
Teboho Mokgalagadi	200 m T35	27.37 PB	2 Q	—N/a		27.02 PB	5
Jan Nehro (guide: Duane Fortuin)	5000 m T11	—N/a				16:09.51 SB	6
Jonathan Ntutu	100 m T13	11.00 AF	1 Q	—N/a		11.03	3rd place, bronze medalist(s)
Jonathan Ntutu	200 m T13	22.40 AF	1 Q	—N/a		22.37 AF	6
Oscar Pistorius	100 m T44	11.18 SB	1 Q	—N/a		11.17	4
Oscar Pistorius	200 m T44	21.30 WR	1 Q	—N/a		21.52	2nd place, silver medalist(s)
Oscar Pistorius	400 m T44	48.31 SB	1 Q	—N/a		46.68 PR	1st place, gold medalist(s)
Samkelo Radebe	100 m T46	11.53	6	—N/a		did not advance	
Union Sekailwe	200 m T38	24.01 PB	3 Q	—N/a		23.66 PB	6
Union Sekailwe	400 m T38	53.28	3 Q	—N/a		51.97 PB	3rd place, bronze medalist(s)
Marius Stander	400 m T38	53.52	1 Q	—N/a		53.62	6
Fanie van der Merwe	100 m T37	11.52 =WR	1 Q	—N/a		11.51 WR	1st place, gold medalist(s)
Fanie van der Merwe	200 m T37	23.83	2 Q	—N/a		23.79	6
Oscar Pistorius; Arnu Fourie; Samkelo Radebe; Zivan Smith	4 × 100 m relay T42–46	—N/a				41.78 WR	1st place, gold medalist(s)

Men—field

Athlete	Events	Result	Rank
Dyan Buis	Long jump F37–38	6.48 =WR	3rd place, bronze medalist(s)
Andrea Dalle Ave	Long jump F37–38	6.02 AF	5
Michael Louwrens	Shot put F57–58	13.64	3rd place, bronze medalist(s)
Casper Schutte	Javelin F42	48.12 AF	4
Union Sekailwe	Long jump F37–38	5.10	10
Duane Strydom	Discus F35–36	35.64	8

Women—track

Athlete	Events	Heat		Semifinal		Final	
Athlete	Events	Time	Rank	Time	Rank	Time	Rank
Anrune Liebenberg	200 m T46	25.79 AF	2 Q	—N/a		25.55 AF	3rd place, bronze medalist(s)
Anrune Liebenberg	400 m T46	—N/a				56.65 PB	2nd place, silver medalist(s)
Ilse Hayes	100 m T13;	12.63	2 Q	—N/a		12.41	2nd place, silver medalist(s)
Anika Pretorius	100 m T13;	13.11 SB	3 Q	—N/a		13.50	8

Women—field

Athlete	Events	Result	Rank
Ilse Hayes	Long jump F13	5.70	1st place, gold medalist(s)
Zandile Nhlapo	Javelin F33–34&52-53	15.43 SB	8
Zandile Nhlapo	Shot put F32–34	6.41 SB	12
Anika Pretorius	Long jump F13	DNS	
Zanele Situ	Javelin F54–56	16.22	4
Chenelle van Zyl	Discus F35–36	24.57	6
Chenelle van Zyl	Shot put F35–36	7.83	9

Management Team

- Manager: Dion Bishop
- Coaches: Suzanne Ferreira, Zelda Hansen, Hennie Koekemoer, Karin le Roux, Ampie Louw
- Team assistant: Neels Matthyser
- Helper: Illse du Preez.

== Cycling ==
Key

- DNF = Did not finish
- N/A = Round not applicable for the event

=== Road ===
Athlete	Event	Classification	Final	
Athlete	Event	Classification	Time	Rank
Roxanne Burns	Women's time trial	C4	32:39.24	6
Madre Carinus	Mixed road race	T1/2	1:00:00	10
Madre Carinus	Mixed time trial	T1/2	16:54.16	12
Stuart McCreadie	Men's road race	H2	1:43:51	8
Stuart McCreadie	Men's time trial	H2	29:03.51	7
Jaco Nel	Men's road race	C2	DNF	
Jaco Nel	Men's time trial	C2	28:12.44	14
Ernst van Dyk	Men's road race	H4	2:00:33	2nd place, silver medalist(s)
Ernst van Dyk	Men's time trial	H4	26:35.95	5
Gerhard Viljoen	Mixed road race	T1/2	48:37	4
Gerhard Viljoen	Mixed time trial	T1/2	15:26.41	7

=== Track ===
Athlete	Event	Classification	Qualification		Final	
Athlete	Event	Classification	Time	Rank	Time	Rank
Roxanne Burns	Women's individual pursuit	C4	4:40.874	6	did not advance	
Roxanne Burns	Women's time trial	C4/5	—N/a		42.621	11
Jaco Nel	Men's individual pursuit	C2	4:12.794	10	did not advance	
Jaco Nel	Men's time trial	C1/2/3	—N/a		1:12.405	11

Management team

- Manager: Mike Burns
- Coach: Ricky Kulsen
- Mechanic: Pieter Jansen.

== Equestrian ==
A team of four represented South Africa in the equestrian competition, one man and three women, although Paralympic equestrian competition is not divided by gender. The competition consists of three dressage events, a championship test, a freestyle test and a team test. There are five competitor classes: Ia, Ib, II, III and IV, with Ia being the most and IV the least impaired.

Individual

Athlete	Horse	Event	Final	
Athlete	Horse	Event	Result	Rank
Anthony Dawson	Roffelaar	Individual championship test grade II	64.571	18
Anthony Dawson	Roffelaar	Individual freestyle test grade II	63.450	16
Philipa Johnson	Lord Louis	Individual championship test grade IV	65.774	10
Philipa Johnson	Lord Louis	Individual freestyle test grade IV	67.200	12
Marion Milne	Shadow	Individual championship test grade Ib	62.826	13
Marion Milne	Shadow	Individual freestyle test grade Ib	63.550	13
Wendy Moller	First Lady Van Prins	Individual championship test grade II	66.000	15
Wendy Moller	First Lady Van Prins	Individual freestyle test grade II	69.900	9

Team

Athlete	Horse	Event	Individual score			Total	
Athlete	Horse	Event	TT	CT	Total	Score	Rank
Anthony Dawson	See above	Team	62.143	64.571	126.714	387.972	14
Philipa Johnson	See above	Team	63.125	65.774	128.899*	387.972	14
Marion Milne	See above	Team	65.818	62.826	128.644*	387.972	14
Wendy Moller	See above	Team	64.429	66.000	130.429*	387.972	14

* Indicates the three best individual scores that count towards the team total.

Management team

- Manager: Tracey Cumming
- Coach: Chris Haazen
- Vet: Sheelagh Higgerty
- Grooms: Enoch Cele, Anton Chimbuanda, Elizabeth Newsome, Teri Smith

== Rowing ==
Qualification Key: FA=Final A (medal); FB=Final B (non-medal); R=Repechage

Athlete(s)	Event	Heats		Repechage		Final	
Athlete(s)	Event	Time	Rank	Time	Rank	Time	Rank
Sandra Khumalo	Women's single sculls	6:02.38	5	6:13.23	4 FB	6:18.88	2 B

Management

- Manager/coach: Marco Galeone

== Swimming ==
Natalie du Toit, a veteran of three Paralympics and one Olympics, announced her retirement from competitive swimming after this event. South Africa's first gold medal came from du Toit winning gold in the women's 100 m butterfly S9.

Key

- Note–Ranks given for preliminary rounds are within the athlete's heat only
- Q = Qualified for the next round
- q = Qualified for the next round as a fastest loser or by position without achieving the qualifying target
- AF = African record
- NR = National record
- N/A = Round not applicable for the event
- Bye = Athlete not required to compete in round
- DNS = Did not start/Withdrawn

Men

Athlete	Event	Heat		Final	
Athlete	Event	Time	Rank	Time	Rank
Charl Bouwer	50 m freestyle S13	24.36 AF	2 Q	23.99 AF	1st place, gold medalist(s)
Charl Bouwer	100 m freestyle S13	53.28 PB	1	52.97 AF	2nd place, silver medalist(s)
Charl Bouwer	400 m freestyle S13	4:17.74	1 Q	4:14.13	5
Charl Bouwer	100 m butterfly S13	59.03 AF	2 Q	59.39	7
Charl Bouwer	100 m backstroke S13	1:01.16	1 Q	59.92 AF	2nd place, silver medalist(s)
Charl Bouwer	200 m individual medley SM13	2:15.28	2 Q	2:14.71	4
Achmat Hassiem	100 m freestyle S10	57.61	7	did not advance	
Achmat Hassiem	400 m freestyle S10	4:27.86	6	did not advance	
Achmat Hassiem	100 m butterfly S10	58.46 AF	2 Q	57.76 AF	3rd place, bronze medalist(s)
Hendri Herbst	50 m freestyle S11	27.02 AF	2 Q	27.57	7
Hendri Herbst	100 m freestyle S11	59.64	1 Q	59.60	3rd place, bronze medalist(s)
Hendri Herbst	400 m freestyle S11	5:08.87 AF	4 Q	4:59.51 AF	7
Hendri Herbst	100 m backstroke S11	1:14.76	5	did not advance	
Kevin Paul	50 m freestyle S10	25.49 AF	4	did not advance	
Kevin Paul	100 m freestyle S10	55.55 AF	5	did not advance	
Kevin Paul	400 m freestyle S10	4:19.64 AF	3 Q	4:16.46 AF	7
Kevin Paul	100 m breaststrokeSB9	1:06.21 PR	1 Q	1:05.70 AF	2nd place, silver medalist(s)
Kevin Paul	200 m individual medley SM10	2:14.97 AF	1 Q	2:15.26	4
Tadhg Slattery	100 m breaststroke SB5	1:39.55	3 Q	1:39.16	5

Women

Athlete	Event	Heat		Final	
Athlete	Event	Time	Rank	Time	Rank
Renette Bloem	50 m freestyle S11	38.00 AF	7	did not advance	
Renette Bloem	100 m freestyle S11	1:25.72 AF	6	did not advance	
Renette Bloem	100 m breaststroke SB11	1:40.61	6	did not advance	
Renette Bloem	200 m individual medley SM11	3:37.13	5	did not advance	
Natalie du Toit	50 m freestyle S9	30.16	3 Q	29.84	7
Natalie du Toit	100 m freestyle S9	1:02.95	1 Q	1:03.45	2nd place, silver medalist(s)
Natalie du Toit	400 m freestyle S9	4:32.59	1 Q	4:30.18	1st place, gold medalist(s)
Natalie du Toit	100 m backstroke S9	1:12.52	2 Q	1:12.56	4
Natalie du Toit	100 m breaststroke SB8	1:30.24	4 Q	1:30.85	7
Natalie du Toit	100 m butterfly S9	1:09.94	1 Q	1:09.30	1st place, gold medalist(s)
Natalie du Toit	200 m individual medley SM9	2:36.92	1 Q	2:34.22	1st place, gold medalist(s)
Emily Gray	100 m freestyle S9	1:08.81	6	did not advance	
Emily Gray	400 m freestyle S9	5:00.44	5 Q	4:59.77	7
Emily Gray	100 m backstroke S9	1:15.59	4 Q	1:16.65	7
Emily Gray	200 m individual medley SM9	2:54.03	6	did not advance	
Marike Naudé	50 m freestyle S13	32.07	7	did not advance	
Marike Naudé	100 m freestyle S13	1:11.45	7	did not advance	
Marike Naudé	100 m breaststroke SB13	1:46.57	7	did not advance	
Shireen Sapiro	50 m freestyle S10	30.87 AF	5	did not advance	
Shireen Sapiro	100 m freestyle S10	1:07.42 AF	8	did not advance	
Shireen Sapiro	400 m freestyle S10	4:59.54 AF	4 Q	5:01.30	8
Shireen Sapiro	100 m backstroke S10	1:09.46	1 Q	1:09.02 AF	3rd place, bronze medalist(s)
Shireen Sapiro	100 m butterfly S10	DNS		did not advance	

Management team

- Manager: Queeneth Ndlovu
- Coach: Karoly Toros
- Coach/tapper: Karin Hugo
- Tapper/helper: Eeden Meyer

== Wheelchair basketball ==
South Africa's men's wheelchair basketball team were in Group A with Australia, Italy, Spain, Turkey and the United States. Competing athletes are given an eight-level-score specific to wheelchair basketball, ranging from 0.5 to 4.5 with lower scores representing a higher degree of disability. The sum score of all players on the court cannot exceed 14.

=== Men's tournament ===
Squad list (classification points)	Group stage		Quarter-final	Semi-final	Final	
Squad list (classification points)	Opposition Result	Rank	Opposition Result	Opposition Result	Opposition Result	Rank
From: Justin Govender (1.0); Siphamandla Gumbi (2.5); Stuart Jellows (4.5); Kyle Louw (1.5); Luvuyo Mbande (3.5); Gift Mooketsi (2.5); Richard Nortje (4.5); Kobus Oeschger (2.5); Marius Papenfus (2.5); Marcus Retief (1.0); Samuel van Niekerk (2.5); Jaco Velloen (4.5)	Australia; L 39–93	6	did not advance			
From: Justin Govender (1.0); Siphamandla Gumbi (2.5); Stuart Jellows (4.5); Kyle Louw (1.5); Luvuyo Mbande (3.5); Gift Mooketsi (2.5); Richard Nortje (4.5); Kobus Oeschger (2.5); Marius Papenfus (2.5); Marcus Retief (1.0); Samuel van Niekerk (2.5); Jaco Velloen (4.5)	Spain; L 50–74	6	did not advance			
From: Justin Govender (1.0); Siphamandla Gumbi (2.5); Stuart Jellows (4.5); Kyle Louw (1.5); Luvuyo Mbande (3.5); Gift Mooketsi (2.5); Richard Nortje (4.5); Kobus Oeschger (2.5); Marius Papenfus (2.5); Marcus Retief (1.0); Samuel van Niekerk (2.5); Jaco Velloen (4.5)	United States; L 29–91	6	did not advance			
From: Justin Govender (1.0); Siphamandla Gumbi (2.5); Stuart Jellows (4.5); Kyle Louw (1.5); Luvuyo Mbande (3.5); Gift Mooketsi (2.5); Richard Nortje (4.5); Kobus Oeschger (2.5); Marius Papenfus (2.5); Marcus Retief (1.0); Samuel van Niekerk (2.5); Jaco Velloen (4.5)	Italy; L 32–61	6	did not advance			
From: Justin Govender (1.0); Siphamandla Gumbi (2.5); Stuart Jellows (4.5); Kyle Louw (1.5); Luvuyo Mbande (3.5); Gift Mooketsi (2.5); Richard Nortje (4.5); Kobus Oeschger (2.5); Marius Papenfus (2.5); Marcus Retief (1.0); Samuel van Niekerk (2.5); Jaco Velloen (4.5)	Turkey; L 54–79	6	did not advance			

Group stage

Team	Pld	W	L	PF	PA	PD	Pts	Qualification
Australia	5	5	0	372	259	+113	10	Quarter-finals
Turkey	5	3	2	331	302	+29	8 (Note: Head-to-head score differential: TUR: +6; USA: −1; ESP: −5)	Quarter-finals
United States	5	3	2	330	259	+71	8	Quarter-finals
Spain	5	3	2	322	292	+30	8	Quarter-finals
Italy	5	1	4	260	309	−49	6	Eliminated
South Africa	5	0	5	204	398	−194	5	Eliminated

Rules for classification: 1) Table points, 2) Head-to-head score differential
Notes:

30 August 2012
20:45

Report

Australia	93–39	South Africa
Scoring by quarter: 27–16, 20–4, 26–10, 20–9
Pts: Eveson 21; Rebs: Eveson 7 Asts: Eveson, Norris 5		Pts: Nortje 14; Rebs: Nortje 10; Asts: three players 2

Basketball Arena, London
Referees: Saskia Warmerdam (NED)

31 August 2012
15:15

Report

South Africa	50–74	Spain
Scoring by quarter: 11–21, 13–20, 9–19, 17–14
Pts: Jellows, Nortje 11; Rebs: Nortje 9 Asts: Papenfus 5		Pts: Zarzuela Beltrán 24; Rebs: Zarzuela Beltrán 6 Asts: Muiño Gámez 7

North Greenwich Arena, London
Referees: Karen Molina (COL)

1 September 2012
13:00

Report

United States	91–29	South Africa
Scoring by quarter: 30–10, 25–4, 17–8, 19–7
Pts: Scott 21; Rebs: Hinze 11; Asts: Lade 5		Pts: Nortje 11; Rebs: Nortje 7 Asts: Papenfus 5

North Greenwich Arena, London
Referees: Mauro Retiz (MEX)

2 September 2012
13:00

Report

South Africa	32–61	Italy
Scoring by quarter: 12–13, 2–12, 13–12, 5–24
Pts: Nortje 15; Rebs: Mbande 7 Asts: Mbande 3		Pts: Cavagnini 33; Rebs: Cavagnini 17; Asts: Moukhariq 7

Basketball Arena, London
Referees: Eisuke Kanno (JPN)

3 September 2012
19:00

Report

Turkey	79–54	South Africa
Scoring by quarter: 18–10, 16–18, 20–12, 25–14
Pts: Gezinci 21; Rebs: Gezinci 9 Asts: Gümüş 5		Pts: Nortje 24; Rebs: Nortje 9 Asts: Papenfus 9

North Greenwich Arena, London
Referees: Mati Quintana (ARG)

11th/12th place match

5 September 2012
8:30

Report

South Africa	36–83	Colombia
Scoring by quarter: 11–18, 7–19, 4–22, 14–24
Pts: Nortje 14; Rebs: Nortje 7 Asts: Nortje 4		Pts: Sanz Londoño 30; Rebs: Hawkins 16; Asts: Sanz Londoño 6

North Greenwich Arena, London
Referees: Philip Haines (AUS)

Management team

- Manager: Willie Riechert
- Coach: Patrick Fick
- Assistant coach: Shadrack Moepeng
- Technical coach: Franck Belen

== Wheelchair tennis ==
Athlete	Event	Round of 64	Round of 32	Round of 16	Quarter-final	Semi-final	Final
Athlete	Event	Opposition Result	Opposition Result	Opposition Result	Opposition Result	Opposition Result	Rank
Evans Maripa	Men's singles	Hamdan (IRI) W 2–1	Cattaneo (FRA) L 0–2	did not advance			
Sydwell Mathonsi	Men's singles	Welch (USA) L 1–2	did not advance				
Kgothatso Montjane	Women's singles	—N/a	Ochoa Ribes (ESP) W 2–1	Griffioen (NED) L 0–2	did not advance		
Lucas Sithole	Quad singles	—N/a		Wagner (USA) L 0–2	did not advance		
Evans Maripa; Sydwell Mathonsi	Men's doubles	Denayer / Gerhard (BEL) L 0–2	did not advance				

Management team

- Manager/coach: Holger Losch
- Assistant coach: Khotso Matshego.

== General team management ==
The following people made-up the team's senior management:

- Chef de Mission: Pieter Badenhorst
- Project manager: Vinesh Maharaj
- Manager (logistics): Clifford Cobers
- Logistics: Madira Sehlapelo
- Manager (athletes services): Chantelle Jardim
- Athlete services: Dumisani Mtwa
- Chief medical officer: Wayne Derman
- Chief physiotherapist: Grace Hughes
- Doctor: Paul Maphoto
- Physiotherapists: Given Baloyi, Edwin Bodha, Greshne Davids, Shantal Edwards, Dan Ntseke, Evah Ramashala
- Classifier: Tarina van der Stockt

== See also ==
- South Africa at the 2012 Summer Olympics
- South Africa at the Paralympics
