= Swimming at the 2004 Summer Paralympics – Women's 100 metre freestyle S9 =

Women's 100m Freestyle S9 at the XII Paralympic Games
- Paralympic Swimming
- Venue: Olympic Aquatic Centre
- Dates: 20 September 2004
- Competitors: 11 from 8 nations
- Winning time: 1:02.83

Medalists
1st place, gold medalist(s)		Natalie du Toit	South Africa
2nd place, silver medalist(s)		Stephanie Dixon	Canada
3rd place, bronze medalist(s)		Christiane Reppe	Germany

The Women's 100 metre freestyle S9 swimming event at the 2004 Summer Paralympics was competed on 20 September. It was won by Natalie du Toit, representing South Africa.

== 1st round ==
Qualified for final round

Heat 1

20 Sept. 2004, morning session

Rank	Athlete	Time	Notes
1	Christiane Reppe (GER)	1:08.13	
2	Stephanie Dixon (CAN)	1:09.26	
3	Mandy Drennan (AUS)	1:09.52	
4	Lara Ferguson (GBR)	1:11.31	
5	Jessica Smith (AUS)	1:12.76	

Heat 2

20 Sept. 2004, morning session

Rank	Athlete	Time	Notes
1	Natalie du Toit (RSA)	1:02.92	PR
2	Kelly Crowley (USA)	1:08.47	
3	Beata Drozdowska (POL)	1:08.54	
4	Irina Grazhdanova (RUS)	1:09.26	
5	Darda Geiger (CAN)	1:09.43	
6	Claire Cashmore (GBR)	1:10.48	

== Final round ==
20 Sept. 2004, evening session

Rank	Athlete	Time	Notes
1st place, gold medalist(s)	Natalie du Toit (RSA)	1:02.83	PR
2nd place, silver medalist(s)	Stephanie Dixon (CAN)	1:05.31	
3rd place, bronze medalist(s)	Christiane Reppe (GER)	1:06.40	
4	Kelly Crowley (USA)	1:08.22	
5	Mandy Drennan (AUS)	1:08.68	
6	Beata Drozdowska (POL)	1:08.77	
7	Irina Grazhdanova (RUS)	1:09.23	
8	Darda Geiger (CAN)	1:10.39	
