= Swimming at the 2012 Summer Paralympics – Women's 4 × 100 metre freestyle relay 34pts =

Women's 4x100m Freestyle Relay 34 points at the XIV Paralympic Games
- Venue: London Aquatics Centre
- Dates: 3 September
- Competitors: 7
- Winning time: 4:20.39

Medalists
| 1st place, gold medalist(s) | | Australia (AUS); Ellie Cole, Maddison Elliott, Katherine Downie, Jacqueline Freney |
| 2nd place, silver medalist(s) | | United States (USA); Susan Beth Scott, Victoria Arlen, Jessica Long, Anna Eames |
| 3rd place, bronze medalist(s) | | Great Britain (GBR); Stephanie Millward, Claire Cashmore, Susannah Rodgers, Louise Watkin |

The women's 4 × 100 m freestyle relay 34 points event at the 2012 Summer Paralympics took place at the London Aquatics Centre on 3 September. There were no heats in this event.

== Results ==
=== Final ===
Competed at 20:28.

| Rank | Lane | Nation | Swimmers | Time | Notes |
|---|---|---|---|---|---|
| 1st place, gold medalist(s) | 7 | Australia | Ellie Cole; Maddison Elliott; Katherine Downie; Jacqueline Freney | 4:20.39 | WR |
| 2nd place, silver medalist(s) | 4 | United States | Susan Beth Scott; Victoria Arlen; Jessica Long; Anna Eames | 4:24.57 | |
| 3rd place, bronze medalist(s) | 5 | Great Britain | Stephanie Millward; Claire Cashmore; Susannah Rodgers; Louise Watkin | 4:24.71 | EU |
| 4 | 3 | Spain | Esther Morales; Teresa Perales; Isabel Yinghua Hernandez Santos; Sarai Gascón Moreno | 4:35.09 | |
| 5 | 2 | China | Ke Liting; Jiang Shengnan; Lin Ping; Zhang Meng | 4:36.23 | AS |
| 6 | 6 | Russia | Nina Ryabova; Oxana Guseva; Olesya Vladykina; Irina Grazhdanova | 4:37.31 | |
| 7 | 1 | Canada | Katarina Roxon; Brianna Nelson; Morgan Bird; Summer Ashley Mortimer | 4:38.23 | |

WR = World Record. EU = European Record. AS = Asian Record.
