= Swimming at the 2016 Summer Paralympics – Women's 400 metre freestyle S9 =

Women's 400 metre freestyle S9 at the XV Paralympic Games
- Venue: Olympic Aquatics Stadium
- Dates: 9 September 2016
- Competitors: 17 from 14 nations

Medalists
1st place, gold medalist(s)		Nuria Marqués Soto	Spain
2nd place, silver medalist(s)		Ellie Cole	Australia
3rd place, bronze medalist(s)		Jialing Xu	China

The women's 400 metre freestyle S9 event at the 2016 Paralympic Games took place on 9 September 2016, at the Olympic Aquatics Stadium. Three heats were held. The swimmers with the eight fastest times advanced to the final.

== Heats ==
=== Heat 1 ===
10:57 9 September 2016:

Rank	Lane	Name	Nationality	Time	Notes
1	4	Ashleigh McConnell	Australia	5:16.28	
2	3	Yuki Morishita	Japan	5:28.86	
3	5	Shanntol Ince	Trinidad and Tobago	5:31.06	

=== Heat 2 ===
11:04 9 September 2016:

Rank	Lane	Name	Nationality	Time	Notes
1	5	Amy Marren	Great Britain	4:54.44	Q
2	4	Nuria Marqués Soto	Spain	4:54.98	Q
3	6	Natalie Sims	United States	5:04.69	Q
4	3	Hannah Aspden	United States	5:04.80	
5	2	Camille Cruz	Brazil	5:09.24	
6	7	Yulia Gordiychuk	Israel	5:13.02	
7	1	Lindsay Grogan	United States	5:14.32	

=== Heat 3 ===
11:12 9 September 2016:

Rank	Lane	Name	Nationality	Time	Notes
1	4	Ellie Cole	Australia	4:50.19	Q
2	2	Jialing Xu	China	4:51.19	Q
3	5	Manon Vermarien	Netherlands	4:53.26	Q
4	6	Emily Gray	South Africa	4:58.10	Q
5	3	Zsofia Konkoly	Hungary	4:59.81	Q
6	1	Katarina Roxon	Canada	5:10.62	
7	7	Francesca Secci	Italy	5:11.18	

== Final ==
19:51 9 September 2016:

Rank	Lane	Name	Nationality	Time	Notes
1st place, gold medalist(s)	2	Nuria Marqués Soto	Spain	4:42.56	
2nd place, silver medalist(s)	4	Ellie Cole	Australia	4:42.58	
3rd place, bronze medalist(s)	5	Jialing Xu	China	4:43.66	
4	3	Manon Vermarien	Netherlands	4:53.42	
5	6	Amy Marren	Great Britain	4:55.38	
6	1	Zsofia Konkoly	Hungary	4:55.77	
7	7	Emily Gray	South Africa	4:59.18	
8	8	Natalie Sims	United States	5:04.88	
