= Western Cape Golden Cross =

The Western Cape Golden Cross is the highest honour awarded by the government of Western Cape.

== 2007 ==
- Nkosi Albert John Luthuli (posthumously)
- Robert Mangaliso Sobukwe (posthumously)
- Stephen Bantu Biko (posthumously)

== 2003 ==
- Natalie du Toit
- Chris Barnard (posthumously)
