= Frankston High School =

Location
- Frankston, Melbourne, Victoria; Australia; 38°09′45″S 145°07′50″E

Information
- Type: Government-funded co-educational secondary day school
- Motto: Latin: Optima semper (Best Always)
- Established: 12 February 1924; 102 years ago
- Principal: Andrew Batchelor
- Enrollment: 1,900
- Colours: Blue and gold
- Website: www.fhs.vic.edu.au

Frankston High School (abbreviated as FHS) or simply Frankston High, is a government-funded co-educational high school, located in Frankston, Melbourne, Victoria, Australia. The school offers education for students from Year 7 to Year 12.

== School profile ==
Frankston High School is a large multi-campus co-educational facility situated in Frankston South. The Year 7 to 10 and Senior School (Years 11 and 12) campuses occupy sites across from one another.

The school has formed a partnership, the Frankston Federation of Schools, with the main neighbourhood primary schools Derinya, Overport, Frankston and Frankston Heights. Through this federation, staff and resources are shared. A transition program helps students adjust from primary to secondary school.

Frankston High School was ranked 16th out of all state secondary schools in Victoria based on VCE results in 2018.

== Languages ==
Both Japanese and French languages are established in the curriculum from Year 7 to Year 12. Sister city and sister school programmes have been established in Japan, France and Soweto, South Africa. The school operates an overseas exchange program, with Frankston High School students on exchange programs in other countries and a number of overseas students studying at Frankston.

== Music ==
There are seven bands operating and approximately 200 students involved in the instrumental music program. Students perform regularly at assemblies and special events and rehearse in a music centre. Concert band and stage band are the two main bands which are available for students at Frankston, as well as smaller, varying music ensembles, such as the guitar ensemble. The establishment of the Harry McGurk Music Scholarship has helped students to continue with these opportunities.

== Sport ==
Frankston High offers an array of elective sports programmes. The facilities include a basketball stadium, indoor swimming pool, gymnasium, weight room, and a new multipurpose sports ground for such sports as netball, hockey, and tennis.

== School magazine ==
A school magazine entitled Kananook is published every year. It looks back over the year and recognises what the school has accomplished.

== House competition ==
The four houses are:

- Yawa (formerly Janaralong; blue)
- Tir-rer (formerly Asatangneen; green)
- Barrbunin (formerly Kananook; gold)
- Brim (formerly Eumemmering; red)

The houses compete in three major competitions: swimming, athletics and cross country.

== Notable alumni ==
- Ellie Cole — Paralympic swimmer and wheelchair basketball player
- Debbie Flintoff-King — Olympic Games, Commonwealth Games and World Championship hurdler and relay runner

== Sister schools ==
Frankston is the sister city of Susono, Shizuoka in Japan. The school maintains a sister school relationship with Kawaguchi-Kita High School in the Greater Tokyo Area, which began in 1988. Regular cultural visits and student exchanges take place between these schools.

== See also ==
- List of high schools in Victoria
