= Union Sekailwe =

South African Paralympic athlete

Personal information
- Nationality: South African
- Born: 6 January 1986 (age 40)
- Height: 174 cm (69 in)

Sport
- Country: South Africa
- Sport: Paralympic athletics
- Disability class: T38
- Event: Sprint
- Club: AngloGold Ashanti Sport Club for the Disabled
- Coached by: Alta Oelofse
Medal record
Paralympic athletics
Representing South Africa
Paralympic Games
Bronze medal – third place	2012 London	400m – T38
IPC World Championships
Silver medal – second place	2013 Lyon	4 × 100 m – T35–38
Silver medal – second place	2015 Doha	400m – T38
Bronze medal – third place	2013 Lyon	400m – T38

Union Sekailwe (born 6 January 1986) is a Paralympian athlete from South Africa competing mainly in category T38 sprint events. Sekailwe competed for his country at the 2012 Summer Paralympics in London, where he won a bronze medal in the 400 metre sprint. Sekailwe has competed at World Championship level on two occasions, picking up three medals. He has also competed in long jump at the Paralympics, and in the javelin throw at the World Championships.
