= Christiane Reppe =

German Paralympic cyclist

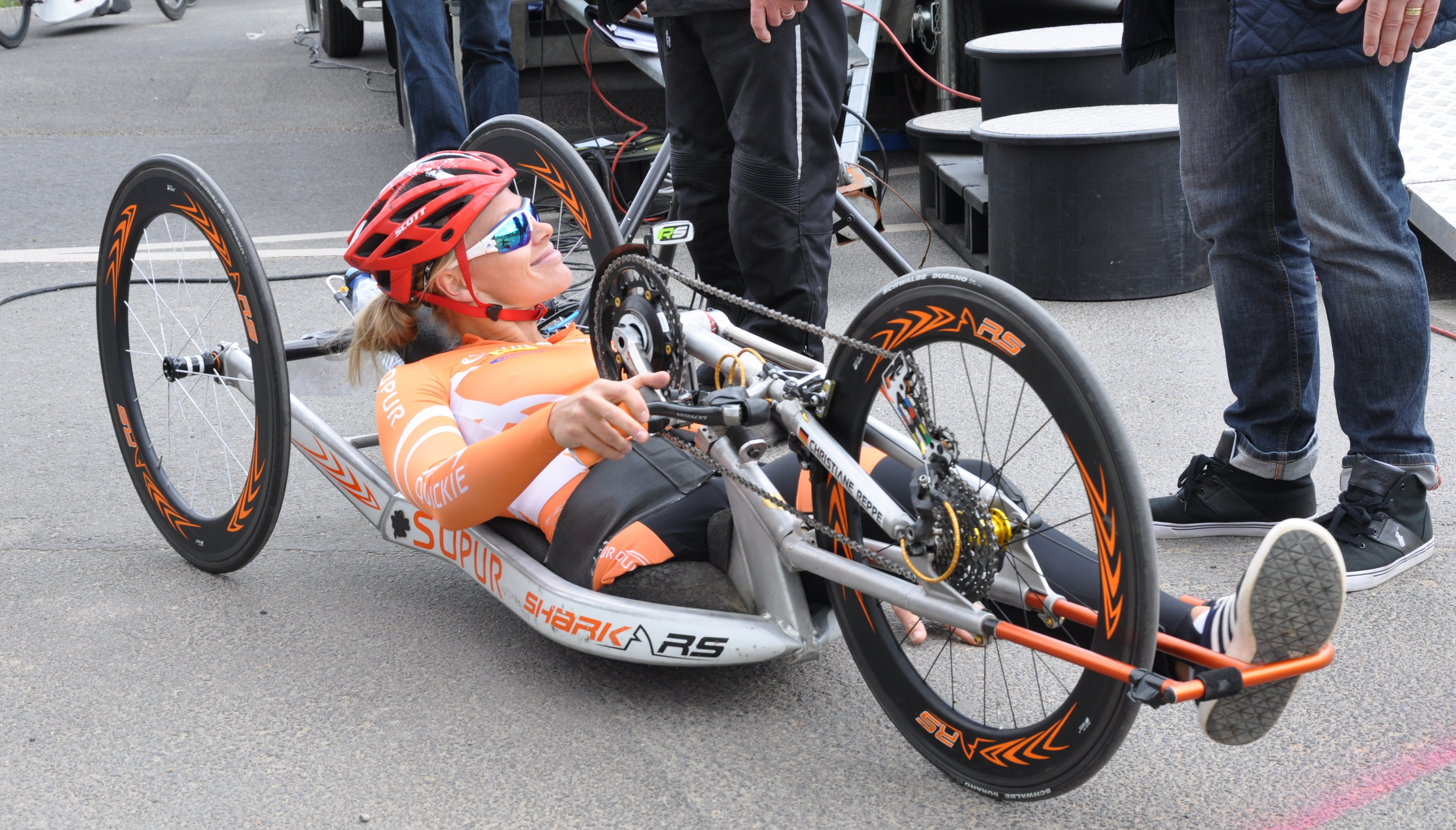
- Reppe on her handcycle in 2016

Personal information
- Nationality: German
- Born: 21 August 1987 (age 39) Dresden, Germany

Sport
- Disability class: S9 (swimming); H4 (cycling)
- Club: GC Nendorf
- Coached by: Patrick Kromer (national); Ralf Lindschulten (personal)
Medal record
Women's swimming
Representing Germany
Paralympic Games
Bronze medal – third place	2004 Athens	100m freestyle S9
Bronze medal – third place	2004 Athens	400m freestyle S9
IPC Swimming World Championships
Bronze medal – third place	2003 Mar del Plata	400m freestyle S9
Bronze medal – third place	2006 Durban	4x100m relay 34pts
Women's cycling
Paralympic Games
Gold medal – first place	2016 Rio de Janeiro	Road race T1–4
Road World Championships
Gold medal – first place	2014 Greenville	Road race H4
Gold medal – first place	2015 Nottwil	Road race H4
Silver medal – second place	2015 Nottwil	Time trial H4
Bronze medal – third place	2014 Greenville	Time trial H4
Women's paratriathlon
World Championships
Bronze medal – third place	2019 Lausanne	PTWC
European Championships
Gold medal – first place	2019 Valencia	PTWC

Christiane Reppe (born 21 August 1987) is a German disability swimmer, and cyclist who has competed at three Summer Paralympics. To date her most successful Games was the 2004 Games in Athens where she won two bronze medals, in the 100m and 400m freestyle S9 events. As a handcyclist she is a two time UCI Para-cycling World Champion.

== Personal history ==
Reppe was born in Dresden in 1987. In 1992 a tumor was discovered in her right leg. The resulting treatment saw her leg amputated.

== Sporting career ==
=== Swimming ===
Reppe's first major international competition was the 2002 IPC Swimming World Championships in Mar del Plata in Argentina. Still a youth, she entered five events winning bronze in the 400m freestyle.

Reppe was 17 years-old when she first represented Germany at a Summer Paralympics; the 2004 Games in Beijing. There she took part in six events, three individual and three relay events. She won two bronze medals, in the 100m freestyle (S9) and the 400m freestyle (S9). For her Paralympic achievements in Beijing she was awarded the Silbernes Lorbeerblatt (Silver Laurel Leaf).

In 2006, she took part in her second World Championships, this time in Durban, South Africa. Reppe entered eight events and won her third World bronze when she was part of the German women's 4 × 100 m relay team. Two years later she represented her country in the 2008 Summer Paralympics in Beijing. She entered four events, all individual. She only managed to qualify for one final, the 400m freestyle (S9), where she finished sixth in a time of 4:51.59.

Reppe took part in both the 2010 IPC Swimming World Championships in Durban and the 2011 IPC Swimming World Championships in Berlin, but failed to medal in either of the Championships. At the 2012 Summer Paralympics in London she entered three events, the 100m and 400m freestyle (S9) and the 100m backstroke (S9). She managed to qualify for both the 100m backstroke and 400m freestyle finals, finishing 8th and 5th respectively.

=== Cycling ===
After London, Reppe and her coach disagreed on her future direction in swimming, and Reppe left the sport. She left sport completely and joined her family's business, but the calling to compete and travel were too strong and she looked for a sport outside swimming that she could join. Initially she tried track and field events, specifically the javelin and shot put, but she had a preference for endurance events and contacted a cycling club in Dresden. She attended a trial biking weekend where she was introduced to handbiking, and she decided to take up the sport.

While Reppe was competing at the London Paralympics she was followed by German film director Niko von Glasgow, who used her experience of the Games as part of his documentary Mein Weg nach Olympia. Through the film she was contacted by German Paralympian Errol Marklein, who was now at the forefront as a coach for handbiking in Germany. In 2013, after the premier of Mein Weg nach Olympia in Essen, Marklin surprised Reppe on the stage with a custom built handbike which was the beginning of a new career for Reppe as a professional rider.

Now classified as a H4 rider, Reppe first represented Germany at a major international when she attended the 2014 UCI Para-cycling Road World Championships in Greenville in the United States. She won her first UCI World title, taking the women's Road race title and followed this with the bronze medal in the time trial. She successfully defended her road race title the following year in the 2011 Championships in Nottwil and improved on her time trial event by taking home the silver medal.
