= Ellie Cole =

Australian Paralympic swimmer (born 1991)

Ellie Cole AM
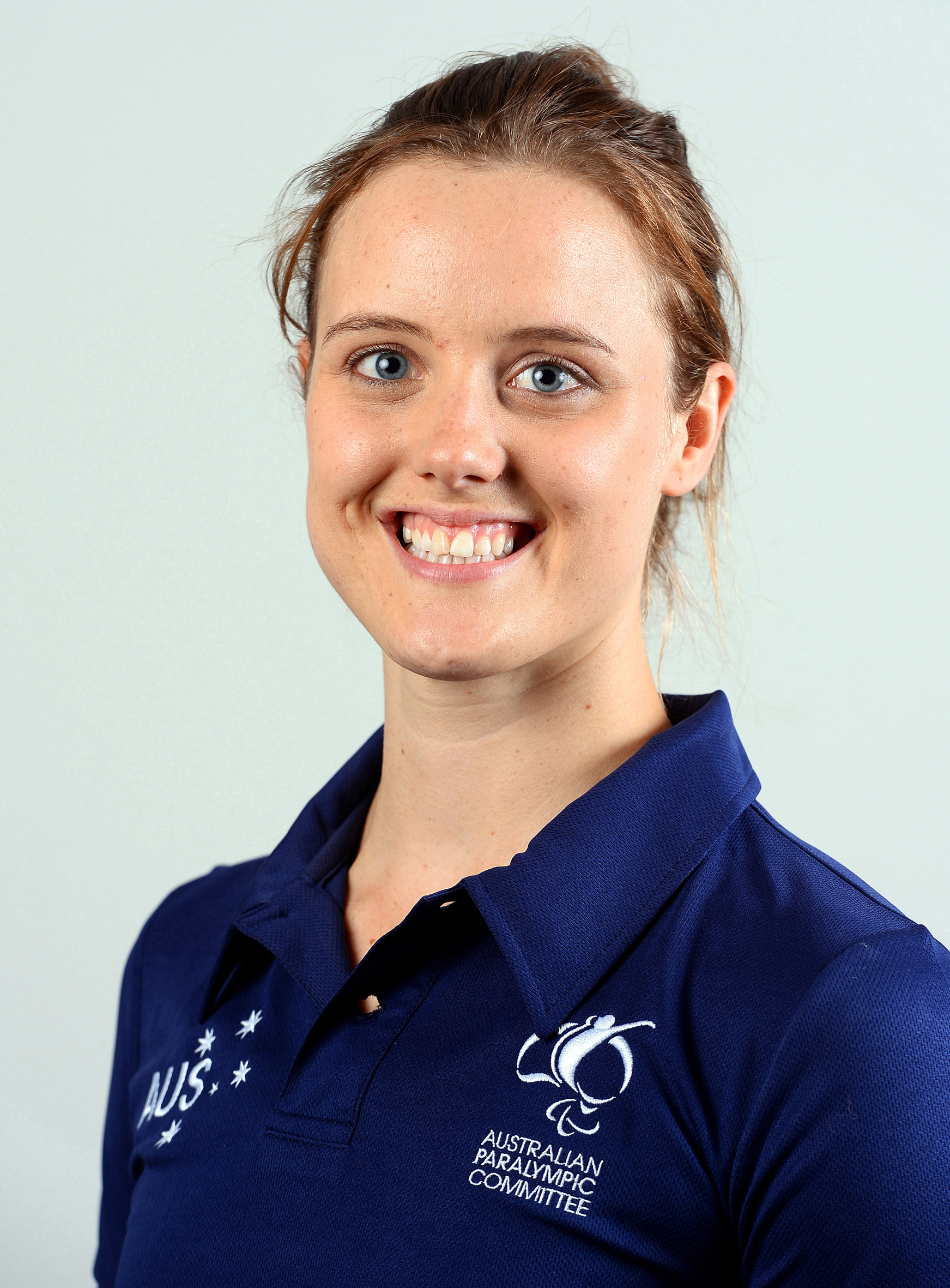
- 2016 Australian Paralympic team portrait

Personal information
- Full name: Ellie Victoria Cole
- National team: Australia
- Born: 12 December 1991 (age 34) Melbourne, Victoria, Australia
- Education: Australian Catholic University
- Years active: 2003–2022
- Life partner: Silvia Scognamiglio (2013–present)
- Children: 1
- Website: https://elliecole.com.au

Sport
- Sport: Swimming
- Strokes: Backstroke, butterfly, freestyle
- Classifications: S9, SM9, SB8
- Club: Knox Pymble
- Coach: Nick Dobson
Medal record
Event	1st	2nd	3rd
Paralympic Games	6	5	6
World Championships (LC)	3	3	4
Commonwealth Games	0	1	3
Total	9	9	13
Women's Paralympic swimming
Representing Australia
Paralympic Games
Gold medal – first place	2012 London	100 m freestyle S9
Gold medal – first place	2012 London	100 m backstroke S9
Gold medal – first place	2012 London	4×100 m freestyle
Gold medal – first place	2012 London	4×100 m medley
Gold medal – first place	2016 Rio de Janeiro	4×100 m freestyle
Gold medal – first place	2016 Rio de Janeiro	100 m backstroke S9
Silver medal – second place	2008 Beijing	100 m butterfly S9
Silver medal – second place	2016 Rio de Janeiro	50 m freestyle S9
Silver medal – second place	2016 Rio de Janeiro	400 m freestyle S9
Silver medal – second place	2016 Rio de Janeiro	4×100 m medley
Silver medal – second place	2020 Tokyo	4×100 m freestyle 34 pts
Bronze medal – third place	2008 Beijing	400 m freestyle S9
Bronze medal – third place	2008 Beijing	100 m backstroke S9
Bronze medal – third place	2012 London	50 m freestyle S9
Bronze medal – third place	2012 London	400 m freestyle S9
Bronze medal – third place	2016 Rio de Janeiro	100 m freestyle S9
Bronze medal – third place	2020 Tokyo	4×100 m medley 34pts
World Championships (LC)
Gold medal – first place	2015 Glasgow	100 m freestyle S9
Gold medal – first place	2015 Glasgow	100 m backstroke S9
Gold medal – first place	2015 Glasgow	4×100 m freestyle 34 points
Silver medal – second place	2006 Durban	100 m backstroke S9
Silver medal – second place	2015 Glasgow	4×100 m medley 34 points
Silver medal – second place	2019 London	100m Backstroke S9
Bronze medal – third place	2010 Eindhoven	200 m medley SM9
Bronze medal – third place	2010 Eindhoven	400 m freestyle S9
Bronze medal – third place	2015 Glasgow	50 m freestyle S9
Bronze medal – third place	2019 London	400m Freestyle S9
Commonwealth Games
Silver medal – second place	2018 Gold Coast	100 m backstroke S9
Bronze medal – third place	2010 Delhi	100 m freestyle S9
Bronze medal – third place	2010 Delhi	100 m butterfly S9
Bronze medal – third place	2018 Gold Coast	100 m freestyle S9

Ellie Victoria Cole, AM (born 12 December 1991) is an Australian retired Paralympic swimmer and wheelchair basketball player. After having her leg amputated due to cancer, she trained in swimming as part of her rehabilitation program and progressed more rapidly than instructors had predicted. She began competitive swimming in 2003 and first competed internationally at the 2006 IPC Swimming World Championships, where she won a silver medal. Since then, she has won medals in the Pan Pacific Swimming Championships, the Commonwealth Games, the Paralympic Games, the IPC Swimming World Championships, and various national championships.

Following the 2012 London Paralympics, where she won four gold and two bronze medals, Cole underwent two shoulder reconstructions and made a successful return to swimming at the 2015 IPC Swimming World Championships, winning five medals, including three golds. She subsequently represented Australia at the 2016 Rio de Janeiro Paralympics, the 2018 Commonwealth Games, and the 2020 Tokyo Paralympics. In claiming her seventeenth Paralympic medal in Tokyo, Cole became Australia's most decorated female Paralympian with six gold, five silver and six bronze medals from four Paralympic Games.

== Personal life ==
Ellie Victoria Cole was born in Lilydale, Victoria, on 12 December 1991. Her mother and grandfather were both swimmers and her father was athletic. At two years of age, she was diagnosed with a rare tumour, a neurosarcoma that was wrapped around the nerves of her right leg. After unsuccessful attempts to treat her cancer with chemotherapy, her right leg was amputated above the knee on 14 February 1994. Eight weeks after the surgery, as part of her rehabilitation, Cole's mother Jenny enrolled her in swimming lessons. Cole's instructors expected her to take up to a year to learn how to swim in a straight line, but it took her two weeks.

Cole attended Mount Eliza North Primary school and Frankston High School, both in the outer Melbourne suburb of Frankston. As of 2021, she lives in Sydney and trains at the Knox Pymble Swim Club. She has completed a Bachelor in Health and Exercise Science at the Australian Catholic University. Cole is in a relationship with partner Silvia Scognamiglio. They met in London at the 2012 Summer Paralympics and have one child, a son born in February 2024.

Cole was featured in the 2020 documentary film Rising Phoenix on Netflix, which focused on the Paralympic Games. She also campaigns for #WeThe15, a global human rights movement for disabled people.

Cole announced her retirement from swimming at the August 2022 Duel in the Pool. She was the general manager of the Australian team at the 2023 Commonwealth Youth Games. On 1 April 2024, Cole was appointed to Paralympics Australia Board. In March 2024, she joined the cast of the tenth season of I'm a Celebrity...Get Me Out of Here!. Cole was a television host for the 2024 Summer Paralympics in Paris.

== Swimming ==
Cole is classified in the S9 category in swimming due to her amputation, a classification that also includes swimmers who have joint restrictions in one leg and those with double below-knee amputations. She began competitive swimming in 2003 and, at the 2006 IPC Swimming World Championships in Durban, she won a silver medal in the women's 100 m backstroke S9 event. Also in 2006 Cole won the 100 m backstroke at the Telstra Australian Swimming Championships. Cole qualified for the Australian Paralympic Swim Team in 2008 and, in the same year, attended the Beijing Paralympics where she won a silver medal in the Women's 100 m Butterfly S9 event and bronze medals in the 400 m Freestyle and 100 m Backstroke events.

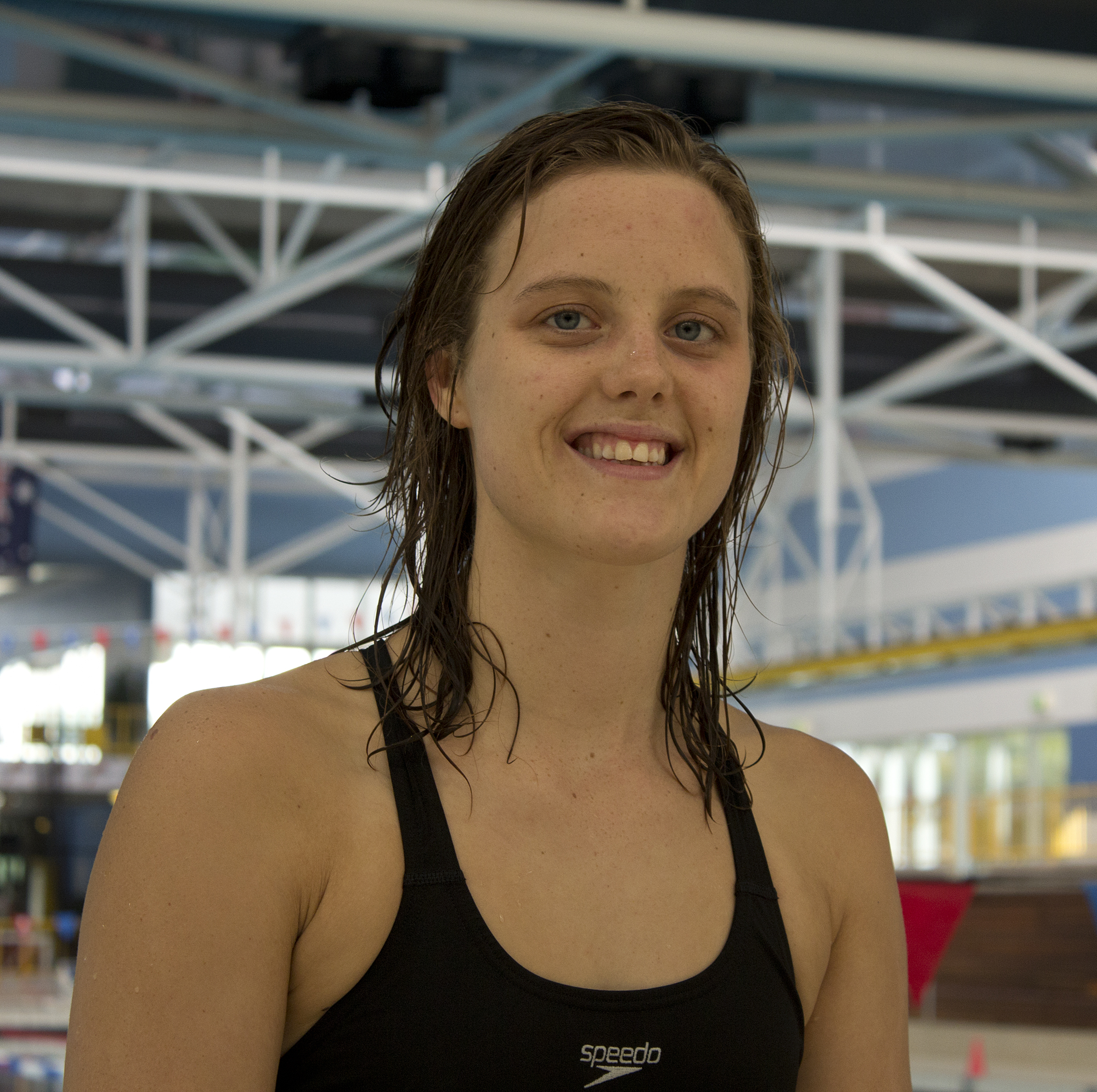
Cole after a training session at the Australian Institute of Sport Aquatic Centre

On 12 August 2009 Cole participated in the 100 m freestyle multi-disability event in the 2009 Australian Short Course Swimming Championships in Hobart, where she broke the world record with a time of 1:04:06. This championship is the qualifying event for the IPC Swimming World Championships, run by FINA, the international organization for swimming. The same year Cole participated in the 2009 IPC Swimming World Championships 25 m in Rio de Janeiro, where she won bronze medals in the 100 m backstroke, 400 m freestyle, 4 × 100 m freestyle relay and the 200 m individual medley.

In 2010 at the IPC Swimming World Championships in Eindhoven, Netherlands she won bronze medals in the women's 200 m individual medley and 400 m freestyle S9 events. In that same year she won bronze medals in the 100 m Freestyle S9 and 100 m Butterfly S9 events at the 2010 Commonwealth Games in New Delhi. At the 2011 Pan Pacific Swimming Championships in Edmonton, Alberta, Canada she won a total of six gold medals, emerging victorious in the women's 50 m freestyle, 100 m freestyle, 400 m freestyle, 100 m butterfly, 100 m backstroke and 200 m individual medley S9 events. Cole has also participated in national championships such as the Australian Age Multi Class Swimming Championships and the New South Wales State Open championships. The former competition is held in Canberra at the Australian Institute of Sport and is designed to prepare elite swimmers for international competition. She then participated in the 2012 New South Wales State Open Championships in multi-class events.

Cole was an Australian Institute of Sport Scholarship holder. Her coach, Graeme Carroll, trained her in Canberra in preparation for the 2012 London Paralympics with an approach that combined swim training with aerobics and gym work. She trained with Teigan Van Roosmalen, a blind and deaf S13 swimmer. Cole also mentors young athletes. When not in high school Cole was undertaking ten or more swimming sessions a week but, while at school, she reduced her load. As of 2021, her coach is Nick Dobson.

At the 2012 London Paralympics, Cole participated in eight events and won six medals. In her first event, the 100 m Butterfly S9, she finished fourth, while South Africa's Natalie du Toit finished first. However, the following night, Cole won the 100 m Backstroke S9, winning her first gold medal of the games in Australian record time. She told the press that it had "been a goal of mine ever since I was 12 years old to beat Natalie du Toit" who was "kind of like the Michael Phelps of swimming for me, she has been a great mentor and relaxes me in the marshalling room. She is my biggest hero." Cole won a second gold medal in the 4 x 100 m freestyle relay 34 pts, this time in world record time. In the 400 m Freestyle S9, she was again beaten by du Toit, who finished first, while Cole took bronze. Cole won a second bronze in the 50 m Freestyle S9, in which du Toit finished seventh, and then gold in the 100 m Freestyle S9, in which du Toit finished third. Cole capped off the games, surprising even herself with a fourth gold medal, in the 4 x 100 m freestyle relay 34 pts, again in Australian record time.

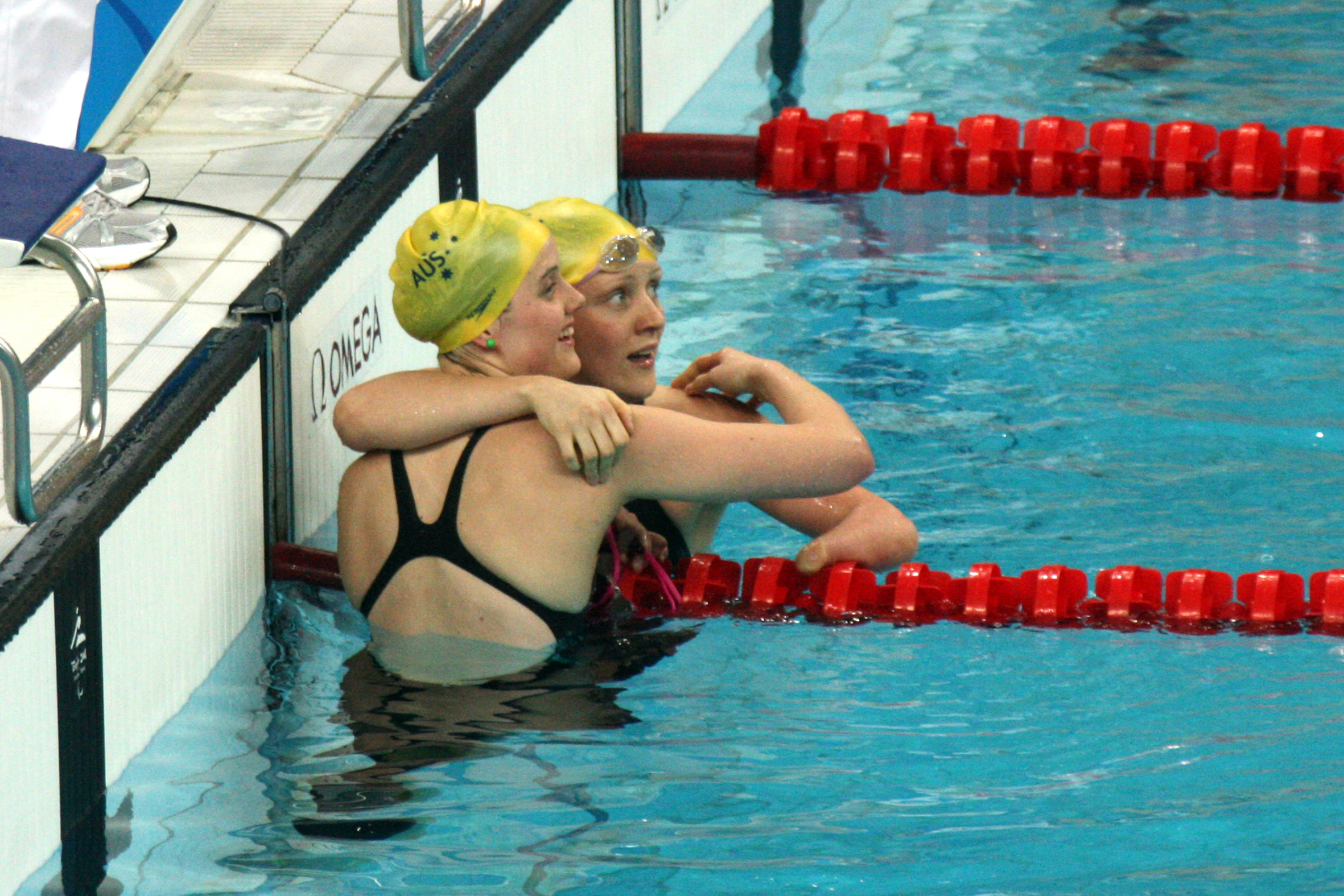
Cole and Annabelle Williams embrace at the end of the S9 100m butterfly final at the 2008 Beijing Paralympic Games

After the London Paralympics, she underwent two shoulder reconstructions that threatened her swimming career. At the 2015 IPC Swimming World Championships, she won gold medals in the Women's 100 m Backstroke S9 breaking the world record in the heats and final, Women's 100 m Freestyle S9 and Women's 4 x 100 m Freestyle Relay 34 points, a silver medal in the Women's 4 × 100 m Medley Relay and a bronze medal in the Women's 50 m Freestyle S9 .

Cole became the first S9 swimmer to break 29 seconds in the 50m freestyle in winning the gold medal at the 2016 Australian Swimming Championships in Adelaide in the 50m Freestyle Multiclass event. Her time of 28.75 broke Natalie du Toit's world record of 29.04.

At the 2016 Rio Paralympics, Cole won two gold medals in the Women's 100 m backstroke S9 and Women's 4 x 100 Freestyle Relay 34 points, three silver medals in the Women's 50 m and 400m Freestyle S9, Women's 4 x 100 Medley Relay 34 points and the bronze medal in the Women's 100m Freestyle S9. Cole alongside Maddison Elliott, Lakeisha Patterson and Ashleigh McConnell broke the world record for the Women's 4 × 100 m Freestyle Relay 34 Points with a time of 4.16.65.

Cole faced a challenging time in the lead-up to Rio Paralympics. She reflects "I was still questioning if I was worthy to be there heading in – and I knew that I was, but it's amazing that even after the amount of psychological sports training that I've had, those thoughts still come in and take you down... Usually the athletes who win are the ones who can put those thoughts aside, and tell themselves that they've got a good crack at winning." Meanwhile, Cole put those thoughts aside and went on to win 6 medals at Rio. At the 2019 World Para Swimming Championships, London, she won the silver medal in the Women's 100m Backstroke S9 and bronze medal in the Women's 400m Freestyle S9.

At the 2020 Tokyo Paralympics, Cole, together with her team of Emily Beecroft, Isabella Vincent, and Ashleigh McConnell won a silver medal in the Women's 4x100m Freestyle 34 pts with a time of 4:26.82, two seconds behind the winners, Italy. She also won a bronze medal in the 34pts Women's 4x100m Medley 34 pts. Her team of Emily Beecroft, Keira Stephens and Isabella Vincent clocked 4:55.70. In claiming the medley bronze, Cole's seventeenth Paralympic medal, she became Australia's most decorated female Paralympian, surpassing the previous record held by swimmer Priya Cooper. Cole also competed in the 100 m freestyle S9, the 400 m freestyle S9, and the 100 m backstroke S9. She qualified for the finals in each but failed to win a medal. At the 2022 Commonwealth Games, Birmingham, England, she finished 5th in the Women's 100 m freestyle S9.

== Wheelchair basketball ==
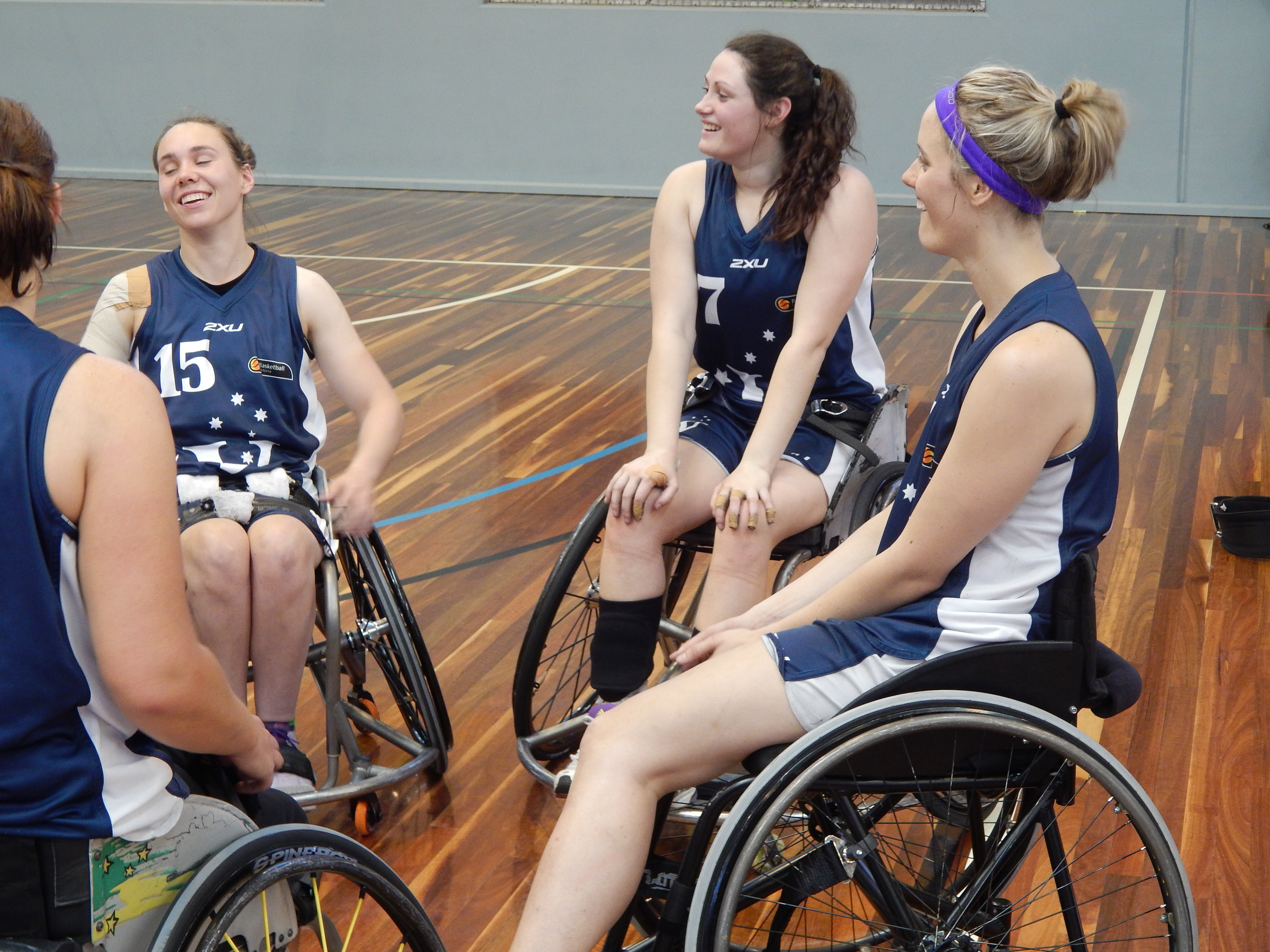
Cole (right) with fellow Victoria wheelchair basketball players Leanne Del Toso (left) and Mel Adams (no. 15)

Cole played wheelchair basketball for Victoria in the Women's National Wheelchair Basketball League in 2013 and 2014 as a 4.0 point player, taking out the league's award for Best New Talent in 2013.

"I loved working in a team because swimming isn't considered a team sport," Cole told an interviewer in 2013. "I definitely wanted a new challenge, when you've been competing for a decade the increments of improvements are quite small. However, in wheelchair basketball I knew that I could make big improvements. I've been chosen for the women's national league team, which is great, so I'm actually getting somewhere, which is a surprise. But my heart is definitely in swimming and I think it always will be."

== Recognition ==
During her time at Frankston High School, Cole received a Debbie Flintoff-King award for the most outstanding sporting achievement from the institution three years in a row; she was also nominated for the Junior Paralympian of the Year award. The award was received for winning silver and two bronze medals in the Beijing Paralympic Games, silver in 100 m butterfly and bronze in 100 m backstroke and 400 m freestyle. In 2009, she received an Outstanding Sporting Achievement Award from the Department of Education and Early Childhood Development.

In 2011, Cole was nominated for The Age's Sport Performer Award in the Performer with a Disability category. In August 2011, she was voted International Paralympic Committee Athlete of the Month after winning six gold medals in Edmonton. She was awarded the Medal of the Order of Australia in the 2014 Australia Day Honours "for service to sport as a Gold Medallist at the London 2012 Paralympic Games." In November 2015, she was awarded Cosmopolitan Magazine's 2015 Sportswoman of the Year.

Cole was the flag bearer for Australia at the 2020 Tokyo Paralympic Games Closing Ceremony. In 2022, she was awarded Most Outstanding Woman in Sport at the Australian Women in Sport Awards. She was promoted to Member of the Order of Australia in the 2024 Australia Day Honours for her "significant service to sport as an advocate for diversity and inclusion".

She was awarded the Rising Star Award at the 2024 Australian Sports Commission Media Awards.
