= Stephanie Millward =

British Paralympic swimmer (born 1981)

Stephanie Millward MBE DL
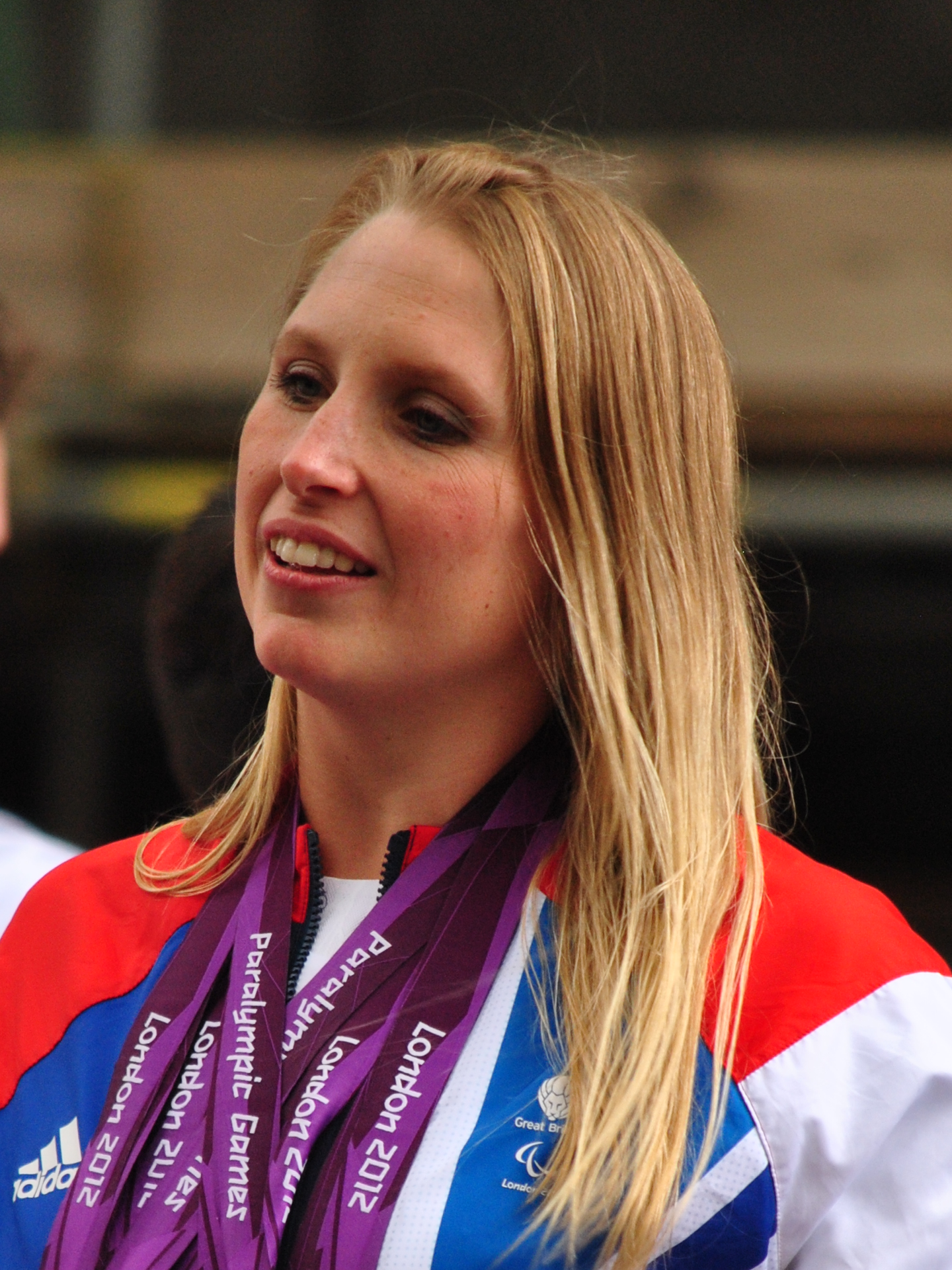
- Millward in 2012

Personal information
- Full name: Stephanie Millward
- Nationality: British
- Born: 20 September 1981 (age 44) Jeddah, Saudi Arabia

Sport
- Sport: Swimming
Medal record
Swimming
Representing Great Britain
| Event | 1st | 2nd | 3rd |
|---|---|---|---|
| Paralympic Games | 2 | 5 | 3 |
| World Championships | 4 | 6 | 1 |
| European Championships | 10 | 2 | 2 |
| Commonwealth Games | 0 | 2 | 1 |
| Total | 16 | 15 | 7 |
Paralympic Games
| Gold medal – first place | 2016 Rio de Janeiro | 100 metre backstroke S8 |
| Gold medal – first place | 2016 Rio de Janeiro | 4 x 100 metre medley relay 34 pts |
| Silver medal – second place | 2012 London | 100 metre backstroke S9 |
| Silver medal – second place | 2012 London | 400 metr freestyle S9 |
| Silver medal – second place | 2012 London | 200-metre individual medley SM9 |
| Silver medal – second place | 2012 London | 4 × 100-metre medley relay 34pts |
| Silver medal – second place | 2016 Rio de Janeiro | 200-metre individual medley SM8 |
| Bronze medal – third place | 2012 London | 4 × 100 m freestyle relay 34pts |
| Bronze medal – third place | 2016 Rio de Janeiro | 400 metre freestyle S8 |
| Bronze medal – third place | 2016 Rio de Janeiro | 100 metre freestyle S8 |
IPC World Championships
| Gold medal – first place | 2013 Montreal | 4x100m medley relay 34pts |
| Gold medal – first place | 2013 Montreal | 4x100m freestyle relay 34pts |
| Gold medal – first place | 2013 Montreal | 100m freestyle S9 |
| Gold medal – first place | 2013 Montreal | 100m backstroke S9 |
| Silver medal – second place | 2010 Eindhoven | 100m freestyle S9 |
| Silver medal – second place | 2010 Eindhoven | 400m freestyle S9 |
| Silver medal – second place | 2010 Eindhoven | 100m backstroke S9 |
| Silver medal – second place | 2010 Eindhoven | 4x100m freestyle relay 34pts |
| Silver medal – second place | 2010 Eindhoven | 4x100m medley relay 34pts |
| Silver medal – second place | 2013 Montreal | 200m medley |
| Bronze medal – third place | 2010 Eindhoven | 100m butterfly S9 |
IPC European Championships
| Gold medal – first place | 2009 Reykjavik | 100 m butterfly S9 |
| Gold medal – first place | 2009 Reykjavik | 4×100 m medley relay 34pts |
| Gold medal – first place | 2009 Reykjavik | 400 m freestyle S9 |
| Gold medal – first place | 2009 Reykjavik | 100 m backstroke S9 |
| Gold medal – first place | 2014 Eindhoven | 100m backstroke S9 |
| Gold medal – first place | 2014 Eindhoven | 400m freestyle S9 |
| Gold medal – first place | 2014 Eindhoven | 4x100m freestyle relay 34pts |
| Gold medal – first place | 2014 Eindhoven | 4x100m medley relay 34pts |
| Gold medal – first place | 2016 Funchal | 400 m freestyle S9 |
| Gold medal – first place | 2016 Funchal | 100m medley relay 34pts |
| Silver medal – second place | 2009 Reykjavik | 100 m freestyle S9 |
| Silver medal – second place | 2016 Funchal | 100 m backstroke S9 |
| Bronze medal – third place | 2014 Eindhoven | 100m butterfly S9 |
| Bronze medal – third place | 2016 Funchal | 100 m freestyle S9 |
Representing England
Commonwealth Games
| Silver medal – second place | 2010 Delhi | 100 m butterfly S9 |
| Silver medal – second place | 2010 Delhi | 100 m freestyle S9 |
| Bronze medal – third place | 2010 Delhi | 50 m freestyle S9 |

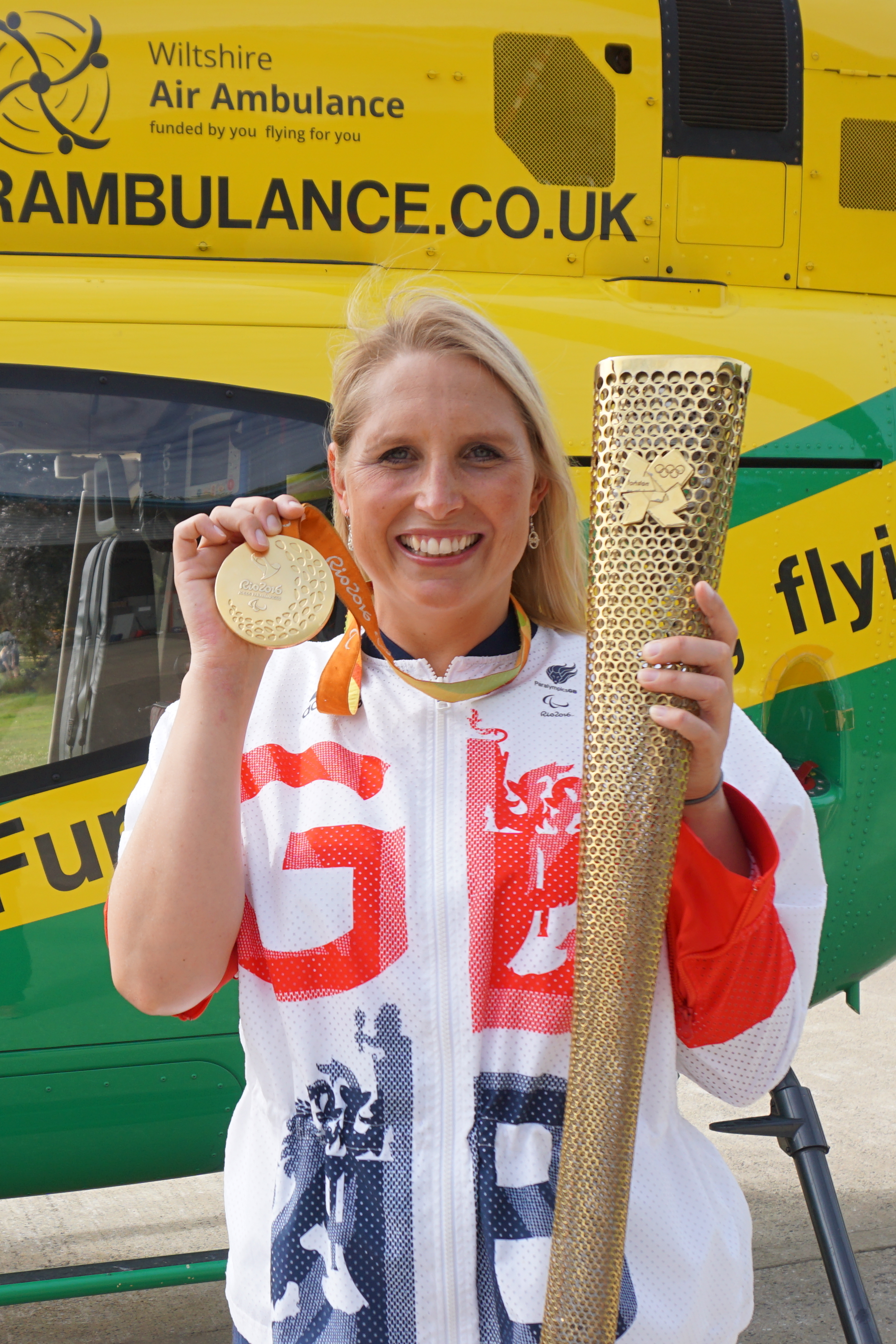
Millward with the Olympic torch at Wiltshire Air Ambulance

Stephanie Millward (born 20 September 1981) is a British former Paralympic swimmer.

At the age of 17 she was diagnosed with multiple sclerosis (MS). As a result, she competed in the S9 (classification) Paralympic classification. Since 12 June 2016, she competes in the S8 classification after her category change from the less impaired S9 category down to S8. She was reclassified at the Berlin Open.

== Personal life ==
Millward was born on 20 September 1981 in Jeddah, Saudi Arabia.

She was awarded the Freedom of the Town of Corsham on 2 March 2013.

Millward is ambassador of Wiltshire and Bath Air Ambulance Charity.

== Education ==
Millward attended The Corsham School, Wiltshire.

== Swimming ==
Millward was close to a place in the British international non-disabled team and, having broken the British record for the 100-metre backstroke at the age of 15, hoped to qualify for the 2000 Summer Olympics before she was diagnosed with MS.

She qualified for the 2008 Summer Paralympics held in Beijing, China where she entered four S9 events. She finished fourth in the 100-metre backstroke, fifth in the 100-metre freestyle, sixth in the 50-metre freestyle and thirteenth in the 100-metre butterfly.

In 2009 Millward won two medals at the British Disability Swimming Championships, taking a silver in the 100 freestyle and bronze in the 100-metre butterfly. At the International Paralympic Committee (IPC) European Swimming Championships held in Reykjavík, Iceland, she won three gold and two silver medals in individual events and added a further two gold medals in relays. At the 2009 IPC Swimming World Championships 25 m in Rio de Janeiro, Brazil she won two gold, three silver and a bronze in individual competitions and two gold medals in relay events.

At the 2010 IPC Swimming World Championships held in Eindhoven, the Netherlands, she won silver medals in the 100 m freestyle, the 400 m freestyle, the 100 m backstroke, the 4×100 m freestyle relay (34pts) and the 4×100 m medley relay (34pts). She also won a bronze medal in the 100 m butterfly. She represented England at the 2010 Commonwealth Games, where she won silver medals in the 100-metre butterfly S9 and the 100-metre freestyle S9 and a bronze medal in the 50-metre freestyle S9, finishing behind winner Natalie du Toit of South Africa on each occasion.

At the 2011 IPC European Championships in Berlin, Germany, Millward won three gold and two silver medals, including setting a world record time of four minutes, 52.40 seconds on the way to winning gold in the 4×100 m medley relay (34pts) alongside Heather Frederiksen, Claire Cashmore and Louise Watkin.

Millward was named as part of a 44-swimmer squad to compete for Great Britain at the 2012 Summer Paralympics in London, United Kingdom. At the Games she won her first Paralympic medal, a silver, in the 100 m backstroke S9. This was followed by four further medals. She won bronze in the 4 × 100 m freestyle relay (34pts), swimming with Cashmore, Watkin and Susie Rodgers; a silver in 400 m freestyle S9, finishing behind South African Natalie Du Toit; another silver came as she once again finished behind du Toit in the SM9 200 m individual medley in a new European record time of four minutes, 4.40 seconds. Her fifth and final medal came in the 100-metre medley relay (34 pts) swimming with Frederiksen, Cashmore and Watkin. The British quartet were in fourth place heading into the final leg but Watkin came through to finish in second place, three hundredths of a second behind the winning team from Australia.

At the 2016 Rio Paralympics, Millward won her first Paralympic gold medals, in the 100m backstroke S8 and the women's 4 × 100 m medley relay 34pts. At the same Games, she won silver in the 200m individual medley SM8 and bronze in the 400m freestyle S8 and 100m freestyle S8.

== Honours ==
Millward was appointed Member of the Order of the British Empire (MBE) in the 2017 New Year Honours for services to swimming. In August 2021, she was appointed a deputy lieutenant of Wiltshire.
