= Émilie Gral =

French paratriathlete, swimmer and politician

Personal information
- Born: 2 August 1986 (age 39) Saint-Affrique, France
- Height: 1.75 m (5 ft 9 in)
- Weight: 54 kg (119 lb)

Sport
- Country: France
- Sport: Paralympic swimming
- Disability class: S9
- Club: SO Millau Natation, Millau
Medal record
Paralympic swimming
Representing France
World Championships (LC)
Bronze medal – third place	2006 Durban	Women's 100m butterfly S9
World Championships (SC)
Bronze medal – third place	2009 Rio de Janeiro	Women's 4x100m medley relay 34pts

Émilie Gral (born 2 August 1986) is a French paratriathlete, swimmer and politician. She is a departmental councillor candidate on the canton of Saint-Affrique, paratriathlete and former Paralympic swimmer. She was born without her left forearm.

Gral started swimming when she was six years old as a form of therapy for problems with her hips and back.

Gral was a departmental councillor candidate for the canton of Saint-Affrique in 2015.
