= Paulina Woźniak =

Polish Paralympic swimmer

Personal information
- Nationality: Polish
- Born: 4 February 1992 (age 34) Szczecin, Poland

Sport
- Sport: Swimming
- Strokes: Freestyle; Breaststroke; Butterfly; Backstroke
- Club: START Szczecin
- Coach: Grzegorz Musztafaga (club); Wojciech Seidel (national)
Medal record
Women's swimming
Representing Poland
Paralympic Games
Silver medal – second place	2008 Beijing	Women's 100 metre breaststroke SB8
Bronze medal – third place	2012 London	Women's 100 metre breaststroke SB8
IPC World Championships (25m)
Bronze medal – third place	2009 Rio de Janeiro	100 m breaststroke SB8
IPC European Championships
Silver medal – second place	2016 Funchal	100 m breaststroke SB8
Bronze medal – third place	2014 Eindhoven	Women's 100m Breaststroke (SB8)
Silver medal – second place	2016 Funchal	200m medley SM9

Paulina Woźniak (born 4 February 1992) is a Paralympic swimmer from Poland. She won a silver medal at the 2008 Summer Paralympics at the 100m Breaststroke class SB8. She won the Women's 100 metre breaststroke SB8 bronze for Poland at the 2012 Summer Paralympics. In 2010, she indicated her ambition was to be an art teacher.
