= Irina Grazhdanova =

Russian Paralympic swimmer

Medal record

Swimming

Representing Russia

Paralympic Games
Silver medal – second place	2004 Athens	50 metre freestyle - S9
Silver medal – second place	2008 Beijing	50 metre freestyle - S9

IPC World Championships
Bronze medal – third place	2010 Eindhoven	50m freestyle S9
Bronze medal – third place	2010 Eindhoven	4x100 metre medley relay 34pts

IPC European Championships
Silver medal – second place	2009 Reykjavik	4×100 m medley relay 34pts
Silver medal – second place	2016 Funchal	100m medley relay 34pts

Irina Grazhdanova (Russian: Ирина Гражданова, born 25 July 1987) is a paralympic swimmer from Russia competing mainly in category S9 events.

== Career ==
Irina competed at both the 2004 and 2008 Summer Paralympics. In both games she won a silver in the 50m freestyle behind South Africa's Natalie du Toit. In 2004, she also competed in the 100m butterfly where she finished last in her heat, 200m individual medley finishing in fifth in her heat but not advancing to the final, 100m freestyle finishing seventh in the final and was part of the Russian team that missed out on bronze in the 4 × 100 m medley by 0.12 seconds. In the 2008 games she also competed in the 100m butterfly, the 100m freestyle, 200m individual medley and the 400m freestyle but failed to make the final in any of the events.
