= Annabelle Williams =

Australian Paralympic swimmer

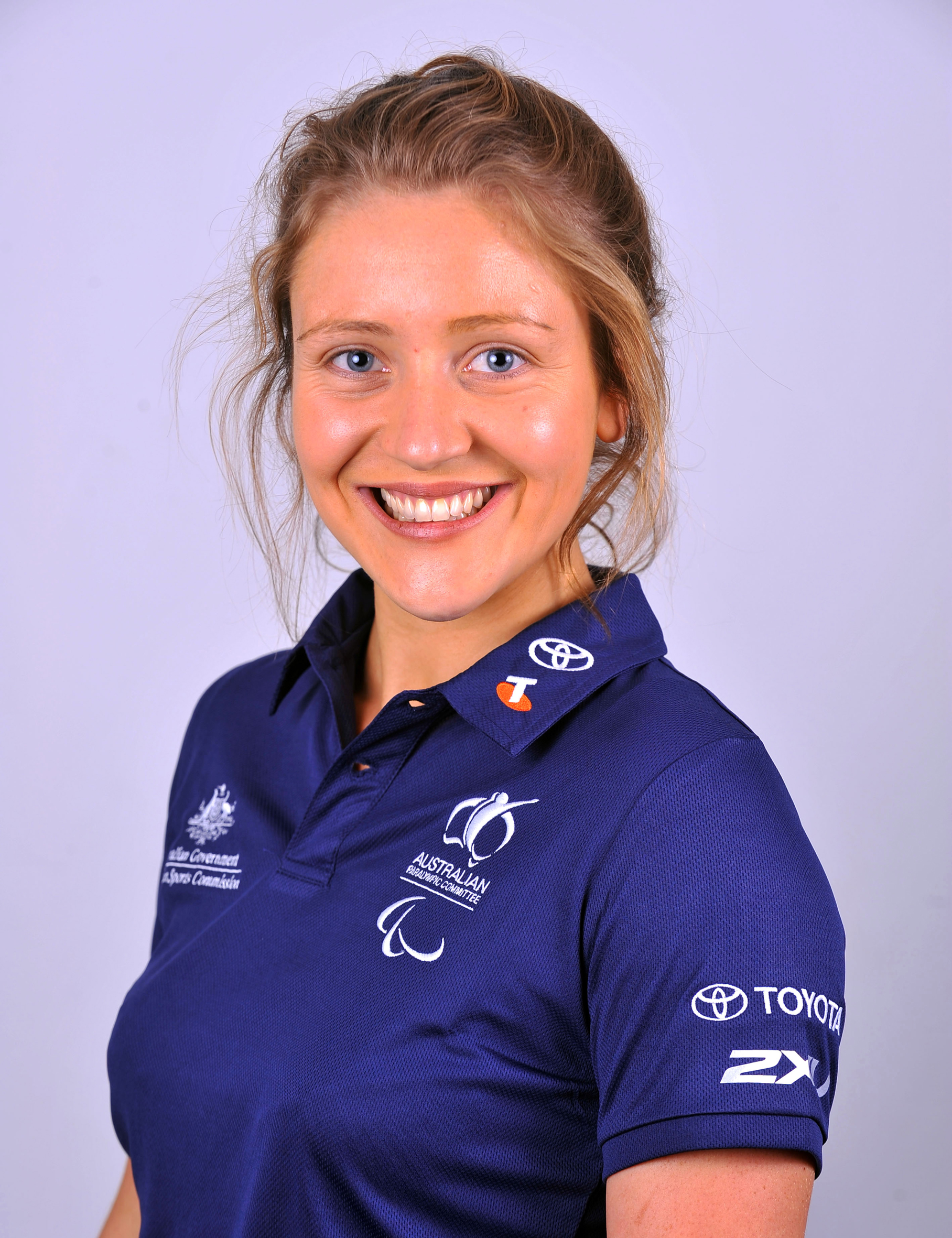
- 2012 Australian Paralympic team portrait of Williams

Personal information
- Full name: Annabelle Williams
- Nationality: Australia
- Born: 21 July 1988 (age 38) Sydney, New South Wales, Australia
- Height: 1.68 m (5 ft 6 in)
- Weight: 60 kg (132 lb)

Sport
- Sport: Swimming
- Strokes: Freestyle, butterfly
- Classifications: S9, SB8, SM9
- Club: Cranbrook Eastern Edge
- Coach: Denis Cotterell
Medal record
Women's paralympic swimming
Representing Australia
Paralympic Games
Gold medal – first place	2012 London	4×100 m medley
Bronze medal – third place	2008 Beijing	100 m butterfly S9
Commonwealth Games
Silver medal – second place	2006 Melbourne	50 m EAD freestyle
Silver medal – second place	2010 Delhi	50 m freestyle S9
Bronze medal – third place	2006 Melbourne	100 m EAD freestyle

Annabelle Williams, OAM (born 21 July 1988) is a Paralympic swimming competitor from Australia. She has a congenital limb deficiency. She appeared in Mad Max 4. Representing Australia, she has won a gold medal at the 2012 London Paralympic Games in the 4 × 100 m medley relay, a bronze medal at the 2008 Summer Paralympics in the Women's 100 m Butterfly S9. At the 2006 Commonwealth Games, she earned a silver medal in the Women's 50 m Freestyle S9 and a bronze in the Women's 100 m Multi Disability Freestyle. At the 2010 Commonwealth Games, she earned a silver in the Women's 50 m Freestyle S9 event.

== Personal ==
Annabelle Josephine Williams was born on 21 July 1988 in Sydney, New South Wales. As a youngster, she lived in Jakarta, Indonesia, only moving back to Australia when she was ten years old. She has completed a degree in international relations and law at Bond University, Gold Coast, Queensland and named Bond University Sportsperson of the year for 2007 and was a finalist for the Australian Universities Sportsperson of the Year for 2007. While attending university, she completed a six-month internship in Paris, France, where she worked for the Australian Embassy. After the 2012 Paralympics, she completed an internship in Washington DC. In 2015, Williams was appointed the Australian Olympic Committee's legal counsel.

Williams is missing the lower part of her left arm as the result of a congenital limb deficiency. She is 168 centimetres (66 in) tall and weighs 60 kilograms (130 lb). Before becoming a swimmer, she was involved with athletics but had to leave the sport because of a stress fracture.

== Swimming ==
Williams is an S9 swimmer and was a member of the Cranbrook Eastern Edge SC. Her main events are the 50 m, 100 m free, 50 m, and the 100 m fly. In the 50 m freestyle event, her best time is 29.42 seconds, a time she set at the 2010 Commonwealth Games. Her personal best in the 100 m freestyle is 1:03.00, a time she set at the 2009 Australian Championships.

Williams competed at the 2006 Commonwealth Games in Melbourne winning a silver medal in the Women's 50 m Freestyle S9 and a bronze in the Women's 100 m Multi Disability Freestyle. In 2008, she was affiliated with the Miami Swimming Club, training five days a week with coaches Denis Cotterell and Raelene Ryan. During the March 2008 Olympic Trials, she broke the 50 m butterfly world record in the morning during a semi-final and then broke it again in the evening during the event final. The 50 m event is not one she had actively trained for, because the distance was not on the 2008 Paralympic programme. At the 2008 Beijing Games, she competed in three events and won a bronze medal in the Women's 100 m Butterfly S9 event. She participated in the World Championships in Eindhoven, Netherlands in 2010 but did not medal. At the 2009 Pan Pacific Championship in Rio de Janeiro, Brazil in the World Short Course, she earned a silver medal in the 100 m fly event.

While completing her Paris internship, she trained at a local French swimming club ahead of the Commonwealth Games. At the 2010 Commonwealth Games in Delhi, she won a silver medal in the Women's 50 m Freestyle S9. In preparation for the 2012 Summer Paralympics, she was one of 14 Australian Paralympic swimmers to participate in a training camp start on 13 May 2012 and ending 29 May at British International School Phuket. At the 2000 Games, she finished sixth in the Women's 50m Freestyle S9, seventh in the Women's 100m Freestyle S9 and was a member of the team that the gold medal in the Women's 4 × 100 m Medley Relay 34 Points. In the lead up to the Games, Williams trained on the Gold Coast in Queensland at Pizzey Park where she was coached by Denis Cotterell.

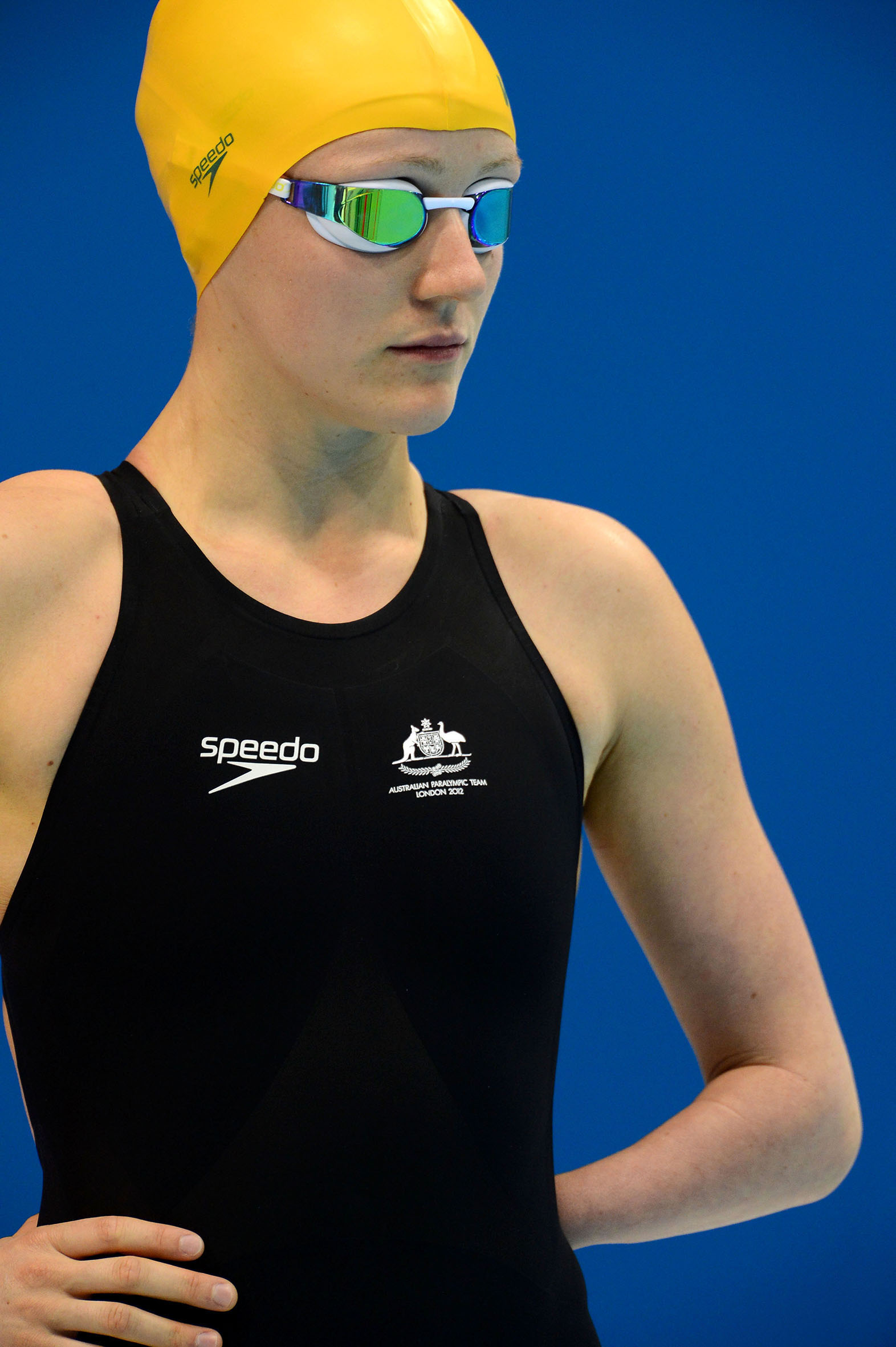
Williams at the 2012 London Paralympics

She was awarded an Order of Australia Medal in the 2014 Australia Day Honours "for service to sport as a Gold Medallist at the London 2012 Paralympic Games."
