= Elizabeth Stone (swimmer) =

American Paralympic swimmer

Personal information
- Nationality: United States
- Born: Born in 1990 Kutaisi, Georgia
- Height: 5 ft 4 in (1.63 m)
- Weight: 125 lb (57 kg)

Sport
- Sport: Swimming
- Strokes: Backstroke, Butterfly
Medal record
Athletics
Paralympic Games
Silver medal – second place	2008 Beijing	Women's 100 metre backstroke
Bronze medal – third place	2012 London	Women's 100 metre backstroke
Bronze medal – third place	2012 London	Women's 100 meter butterfly
World Para Swimming Championships
Gold medal – first place	2006 Durban	Women's 4x100 meter medley
Gold medal – first place	2010 Eindhoven	Women's 4x100 meter medley
Bronze medal – third place	2006 Durban	Women's 100 meter backstroke

Elizabeth Stone born in (1990) is an American Paralympic swimmer of Georgian origin, who competes in the S9 classification due to proximal femoral focal deficiency.

- she began her swimming career as a means of physical therapy and recreation.

== Biography ==
Elizabeth Stone was born in 1994 in Kutaisi, Georgia. She was adopted on the 4th of July at age 4 from Kutaisi, Georgia.

- In the last year of high school she competed in track & field and would run a 25 kilometres (16 mi) race, the River Bank Run in Grand Rapids, Michigan. She participated in the 2004 Summer Paralympics in Athens, Greece.
- At the 2006 World Championships she won a gold medal for 4x100 metre medley and a bronze one for the 100 metres (330 ft) backstroke.
- At the 2008 Paralympics she won a silver medal for another 100 metre backstroke in Beijing, China
- At the 2010 World Championships she won another gold for 4x100 metre medley which was held at Eindhoven, Netherlands.
- At the 2012 Summer Paralympics she received a bronze medal for her participation at London.
