= Shanntol Ince =

Trinidad and Tobago Paralympic swimmer

Personal information
- Nickname: Shanny
- Born: 10 April 1995 (age 31) Claxton Bay, Trinidad
- Height: 1.50 m (4 ft 11 in)
- Weight: 48 kg (106 lb)

Sport
- Country: Trinidad and Tobago
- Sport: Paralympic swimming
- Disability class: S9
Medal record
Paralympic swimming
Representing Trinidad and Tobago
Parapan American Games
Bronze medal – third place	2011 Guadalajara	100m freestyle S9
Bronze medal – third place	2011 Guadalajara	100m backstroke S9

Shanntol Ince (born 10 April 1995) is a Trinidad and Tobago Paralympic swimmer who competes in international elite events. She is a double Parapan American Games bronze medalist and has competed at the Paralympic Games twice in 2012 and 2016. She was born with her right leg shorter than her left leg.
