= Natalie du Toit =

South African paralympic swimmer

Dame Natalie du Toit OIG MBE
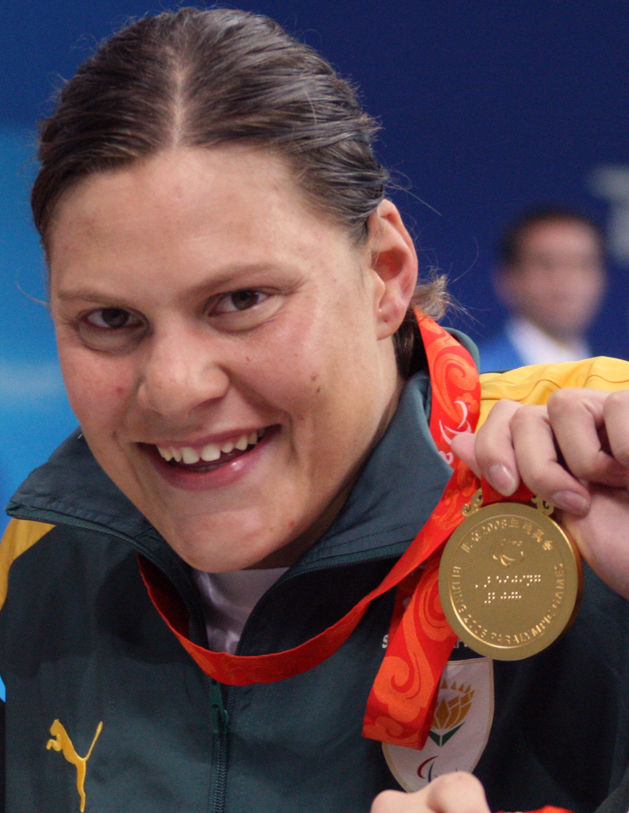
- du Toit at the 2008 Summer Paralympics

Personal information
- Full name: Natalie du Toit
- Nickname: Noodle
- Nationality: South African
- Born: 29 January 1984 (age 42) Cape Town, South Africa
- Height: 5'9
- Weight: 165 Lbs

Sport
- Sport: Swimming
- Strokes: Butterfly, backstroke, freestyle, breaststroke
Medal record
Women's para swimming
Representing South Africa
Event	1st	2nd	3rd
Paralympic Games	13	2	0
World Championships	12	1	1
All Africa Games	5	0	0
Commonwealth Games	7	0	0
Total	37	3	1
Paralympic Games
Gold medal – first place	2004 Athens	50 m freestyle S9
Gold medal – first place	2004 Athens	100 m freestyle S9
Gold medal – first place	2004 Athens	400 m freestyle S9
Gold medal – first place	2004 Athens	100 m butterfly S9
Gold medal – first place	2004 Athens	200 m individual medley SM9
Gold medal – first place	2008 Beijing	50 m freestyle S9
Gold medal – first place	2008 Beijing	100 m freestyle S9
Gold medal – first place	2008 Beijing	400 m freestyle S9
Gold medal – first place	2008 Beijing	100 m butterfly S9
Gold medal – first place	2008 Beijing	200 m individual medley SM9
Gold medal – first place	2012 London	100 m butterfly S9
Gold medal – first place	2012 London	400 m freestyle S9
Gold medal – first place	2012 London	200 m individual medley S9
Silver medal – second place	2004 Athens	100 m backstroke S9
Silver medal – second place	2012 London	100m Freestyle S9
World Championships
Gold medal – first place	2006 Durban	50 m freestyle S9
Gold medal – first place	2006 Durban	100 m freestyle S9
Gold medal – first place	2006 Durban	400 m freestyle S9
Gold medal – first place	2006 Durban	100 m butterfly S9
Gold medal – first place	2006 Durban	200m medley S9
Gold medal – first place	2006 Durban	5 km open water
Gold medal – first place	2010 Eindhoven	100 m butterfly S9
Gold medal – first place	2010 Eindhoven	100 m freestyle S9
Gold medal – first place	2010 Eindhoven	400 m freestyle S9
Gold medal – first place	2010 Eindhoven	200 m medley SM9
Gold medal – first place	2010 Eindhoven	100 m backstroke S9
Gold medal – first place	2010 Eindhoven	5 km open water S1-10
Silver medal – second place	2010 Eindhoven	50 m freestyle S9
Bronze medal – third place	2010 Eindhoven	100 m breaststroke SB8
All-Africa Games
Gold medal – first place	2003 Abuja	800 m Freestyle
Gold medal – first place	2007 Algiers	1500 m Freestyle
Gold medal – first place	2011 Maputo	100 m freestyle S6-S10
Gold medal – first place	2011 Maputo	100 m backstroke S6-S10
Gold medal – first place	2011 Maputo	200 m individual medley S6-S10
Commonwealth Games
Gold medal – first place	2002 Manchester	50 m freestyle EAD
Gold medal – first place	2002 Manchester	100 m freestyle EAD
Gold medal – first place	2006 Melbourne	50 m freestyle EAD
Gold medal – first place	2006 Melbourne	100 m freestyle EAD
Gold medal – first place	2010 Delhi	50 m freestyle EAD
Gold medal – first place	2010 Delhi	100 m freestyle EAD
Gold medal – first place	2010 Delhi	100 m butterfly EAD

Natalie du Toit OIG MBE (/dʊˈtɔɪ/; (Note: Interview with Natalie du Toit, "African Voices", aired 14 May 2011 on CNN International. Her name is said several times by an announcer (but not by du Toit herself).) born 29 January 1984) is a South African swimmer. She is best known for the gold medals she won at the 2004 Paralympic Games as well as the Commonwealth Games. She was one of two Paralympians to compete at the 2008 Summer Olympics in Beijing; the other being table tennis player Natalia Partyka. Du Toit became the third amputee ever to qualify for the Olympics, where she placed 16th in the 10 km swim. (Note: George Eyser, who had a wooden leg, competed at the 1904 Summer Olympics; the circumstances of Eyser's participation in the Games are unknown. Poland's Natalia Partyka also competed at both the Olympics and the Paralympics in Beijing, in table tennis.)

== Early life ==
Du Toit was born in Cape Town, South Africa and attended Timour Hall Primary school. She began competing internationally in swimming at the age of 14. In February 2001, her left leg was amputated at the knee after she was hit by a car while riding her scooter back to school after swimming practice. She was 17 at the time. Three months later, before she had started walking again, she was back in the pool with the intention of competing in the 2002 Commonwealth Games. Du Toit swims without the aid of a prosthetic limb.

She completed her scholastic education at the Reddam House, Cape Town after which she studied for a Bachelor of Science degree at the University of Cape Town, specializing in genetics and physiology. In her free time she does motivational speaking.

== Swimming career ==
Du Toit first competed internationally at the age of 14, when she took part in the 1998 Commonwealth Games in Kuala Lumpur. During the 2002 Commonwealth Games in Manchester, Du Toit, who was then 18 years old, won both the multi-disability 50 m freestyle and the multi-disability 100 m freestyle in world record time. She also made sporting history by qualifying for the 800 m able-bodied freestyle final – the first time that an athlete with a disability had qualified for the final of an able-bodied event. At the closing of the Manchester Commonwealth Games, she was presented with the first David Dixon Award for Outstanding Athlete of the Games.

In 2003, competing against able-bodied swimmers, Du Toit won gold in the 800 metres freestyle at the All-Africa Games as well as silver in the 800 metres freestyle and bronze in the 400 metres freestyle at the Afro-Asian Games.

She narrowly missed qualifying for the Olympics in Athens in 2004, but during the Paralympics that were held in the same city, she won one silver and five gold medals. In the same year, her courage and achievements were acknowledged with a nomination for the Laureus World Sportsperson of the Year 2004 with Disability Award. At the 2006 Commonwealth Games she repeated her previous performance by winning the same two golds as she had in Manchester. In 2006 Du Toit also won six gold medals at the fourth IPC World Swimming Championships, finishing third overall in a race which included 36 males and 20 females.

On 3 May 2008, Du Toit qualified for the 2008 Beijing Olympics after finishing fourth in the 10 km open water race at the Open Water World Championships in Seville, Spain. Her time was only 5.1 seconds off the winner in a race that made its first Olympic appearance in Beijing. At the Beijing Olympics women's 10 km race, she finished in 16th place, 1:22.2 minutes behind the winner. She also took part in the 2008 Summer Paralympics, winning five gold medals.

On 27 August 2012, just three days before the start of the 2012 Summer Paralympics, she announced her intention to retire at the end of the event.

== 2008 Olympic and Paralympic opening ceremonies ==
South Africa's Olympic Committee chose Du Toit to carry their flag at the 2008 Summer Olympics opening ceremony, making her the first athlete to carry a flag in both Olympics and Paralympics in a single year.

== Major sporting achievements ==
- 200 m SM9 individual medley swimming gold medal – Paralympics (2012)
- 100 m S9 butterfly swimming gold medal – Paralympics (2012)
- 400 m S9 freestyle swimming gold medal – Paralympics (2012)
- 100 m S9 freestyle swimming silver medal – Paralympics (2012)
- 100 m S9 freestyle swimming gold medal – Commonwealth Games (2010)
- 100 m S9 butterfly swimming gold medal – Commonwealth Games (2010)
- 50 m S9 freestyle swimming gold medal – Commonwealth Games (2010)
- 50 m S9 freestyle swimming gold medal – Paralympics (2008)
- 400 m S9 freestyle swimming gold medal – Paralympics (2008)
- 200 m SM9 individual medley swimming gold medal – Paralympics (2008)
- 100 m S9 freestyle swimming gold medal – Paralympics (2008)
- 100 m S9 butterfly swimming gold medal – Paralympics (2008)
- 100 m freestyle swimming EAD (multi-disability) gold – Commonwealth Games (2006)
- 50 m freestyle swimming EAD (multi-disability) gold – Commonwealth Games (2006)
- 100 m S9 backstroke swimming silver medal – Paralympics (2004)
- 100 m S9 butterfly swimming gold medal – Paralympics (2004)
- 100 m S9 freestyle swimming gold medal – Paralympics (2004)
- 200 m SM9 individual medley swimming gold medal – Paralympics (2004)
- 400 m S9 freestyle swimming gold medal – Paralympics (2004)
- 50 m S9 freestyle swimming gold medal – Paralympics (2004)
- 800 m freestyle swimming gold medal – All-Africa Games (2003)
- 800 m freestyle swimming silver medal – Afro-Asian Games (2003)
- 400 m freestyle swimming bronze medal – Afro-Asian Games (2003)
- David Dixon Award for outstanding athlete – Commonwealth Games (2002)
- 100 m freestyle swimming EAD (multi-disability) gold – Commonwealth Games (2002)
- 50 m freestyle swimming EAD (multi-disability) gold – Commonwealth Games (2002)

== Awards and honours ==
- In August 2002, she was awarded the Western Cape Golden Cross. During the award ceremony Western Cape Premier Marthinus van Schalkwyk said she had gone "beyond gold and swam her way into the hearts of not only South Africans but the whole world".
- Du Toit was voted 48th in the Top 100 Great South Africans in 2004 by the South African Broadcasting Corporation.
- She won the Whang Youn Dai Achievement Award in 2008.
- In December 2009 she received the Order of Ikhamanga in Gold "for her exceptional achievements in swimming."
- On 10 March 2010, she was awarded the Laureus World Sportsperson of the Year with a Disability for "breaking down the barriers between disabled and able-bodied sport".
- In 2013, she was made an Honorary Member of the Order of the British Empire (MBE) for services to Paralympic sport.

== See also ==
- Athletes with most gold medals in one event at the Paralympic Games
- List of athletes who have competed in the Paralympics and Olympics
- 2008 Summer Olympics national flag bearers
- List of flag bearers for South Africa at the Olympics
- 2008 Summer Paralympics national flag bearers
- George Eyser
- Olivér Halassy
- Natalia Partyka

== Notes ==
Awards and achievements
Preceded by (Canada) Valérie Grand'Maison	World Disabled Swimmer of the Year; 2008	Succeeded by (United States) Mallory Weggemann
Preceded by (Brazil) Daniel Dias	Laureus World Sportsperson with a Disability of the Year; 2010	Succeeded by (Germany) Verena Bentele
Olympic Games
Preceded by Alexander Heath	Flagbearer for South Africa; Beijing 2008	Succeeded by Oliver Kraas
