= Swimming at the 2022 Commonwealth Games – Qualification =

There was a nominal total of 96 quota places available (in parasport events only) for swimming at the 2022 Commonwealth Games; 48 each for men and women.

== Rules ==
Each Commonwealth Games Association (CGA) may qualify up to three places per event, which equates to a maximum quota of thirty-six. Seven places per event are determined by the World Para Swimming (WPS) World Rankings (for performances between 31 December 2020 and 18 April 2022), with the last spot reserved for a Bipartite Invitation; all those who qualify may also enter other events provided the three-per-CGA limit is respected.

The events are open to sport classes as follows:

- Men's 50 m freestyle S7: S6/7
- Men's 50 m freestyle S13: S11–13
- Men's 200 m freestyle S14: S14
- Men's 100 m backstroke S9: S8/9
- Men's 100 m breaststroke SB8: SB7/8
- Men's 100 m butterfly S10: S9/10
- Women's 50 m freestyle S13: S11–13
- Women's 100 m freestyle S9: S8/9
- Women's 200 m freestyle S14: S14
- Women's 100 m backstroke S8: S7/8
- Women's 100 m breaststroke SB6: SB5/6
- Women's 200 m individual medley SM10: SM9/10

== Timeline ==
Event	Dates	Location
World Para Swimming World Rankings	31 December 2020 – 18 April 2022	Various locations

== Men's events ==
=== 50 m freestyle S7 ===
Means of qualification	Quotas	Qualified
WPS Rankings	7	Matt Levy (AUS); Toh Wei Soong (SGP); Christian Sadie (RSA); Michael Jones (ENG); William Perry (ENG); Suyash Jadhav (IND); Joel Mundie (AUS)
Bipartite Invitation	1	Niranjan Mukundan (IND)
TOTAL	8	

=== 50 m freestyle S13 ===
Means of qualification	Quotas	Qualified
WPS Rankings	5	Braedan Jason (AUS); Jacob Templeton (AUS); Nicolas-Guy Turbide (CAN); Stephen Clegg (SCO); Oscar Stubbs (AUS)
Bipartite Invitation	0	
TOTAL	5	

=== 200 m freestyle S14 ===
Means of qualification	Quotas	Qualified
WPS Rankings	7	Reece Dunn (ENG); Benjamin Hance (AUS); Liam Schluter (AUS); Nicholas Bennett (CAN); Jordan Catchpole (ENG); Thomas Hamer (ENG); Dylan Broom (WAL)
Bipartite Invitation	1	Jack Ireland (AUS)
TOTAL	8	

=== 100 m backstroke S9 ===
Means of qualification	Quotas	Qualified
WPS Rankings	6	Jesse Reynolds (NZL); Harrison Vig (AUS); Brenden Hall (AUS); Barry McClements (NIR); Sam Downie (SCO); Ashish Kumar (IND)
Bipartite Invitation	0	
TOTAL	6	

=== 100 m breaststroke SB8 ===
Means of qualification	Quotas	Qualified
WPS Rankings	4	Timothy Disken (AUS); Timothy Hodge (AUS); Blake Cochrane (AUS); Joshua Willmer (NZL)
Bipartite Invitation	0	
TOTAL	4	

=== 100 m butterfly S10 ===
Means of qualification	Quotas	Qualified
WPS Rankings	6	William Martin (AUS); Col Pearse (AUS); Alex Saffy (AUS); Alec Elliot (CAN); James Hollis (ENG); Oliver Carter (SCO)
Bipartite Invitation	0	
TOTAL	6	

== Women's events ==
=== 50 m freestyle S13 ===
Means of qualification	Quotas	Qualified
WPS Rankings	7	Katja Dedekind (AUS); Hannah Russell (ENG); Kirralee Hayes (AUS); Jenna Jones (AUS); Rebecca Redfern (ENG); Abby Kane (SCO); Cornelle Leach (RSA)
Bipartite Invitation	1	Alani Ferreira (RSA)
TOTAL	8	

=== 100 m freestyle S9 ===
Means of qualification	Quotas	Qualified
WPS Rankings	7	Sophie Pascoe (NZL); Toni Shaw (SCO); Ellie Cole (AUS); Ashleigh McConnell (AUS); Emily Beecroft (AUS); Alice Tai (ENG); Husnah Kukundakwe (UGA)
Bipartite Invitation	0	
TOTAL	7	

=== 200 m freestyle S14 ===
Means of qualification	Quotas	Qualified
WPS Rankings	7	Bethany Firth (NIR); Jessica-Jane Applegate (ENG); Louise Fiddes (ENG); Madeleine McTernan (AUS); Poppy Maskill (ENG); Ruby Storm (AUS); Jade Lucy (AUS)
Bipartite Invitation	0	
TOTAL	7	

=== 100 m backstroke S8 ===
Means of qualification	Quotas	Qualified
WPS Rankings	6	Tupou Neiufi (NZL); Lily Rice (WAL); Camille Bérubé (CAN); Isabella Vincent (AUS); Ella Jones (AUS); Siomha Brady (NIR)
Bipartite Invitation	0	
TOTAL	8	

=== 100 m breaststroke SB6 ===
Means of qualification	Quotas	Qualified
WPS Rankings	4	Maisie Summers-Newton (ENG); Grace Harvey (ENG); Camille Bérubé (CAN); Danielle Kisser (CAN)
Bipartite Invitation	0	
TOTAL	4	

=== 200 m individual medley SM10 ===
Means of qualification	Quotas	Qualified
WPS Rankings	7	Aurélie Rivard (CAN); Jasmine Greenwood (AUS); Keira Stephens (AUS); Lakeisha Patterson (AUS); Toni Shaw (SCO); Katarina Roxon (CAN); Meghan Willis (WAL)
Bipartite Invitation	1	Rebecca Lewis (WAL)
TOTAL	8	
