= Swimming at the Commonwealth Games =

Swimming is one of the sports at the quadrennial Commonwealth Games competition. It has been a Commonwealth Games sport since the inaugural edition of the event's precursor, the 1930 British Empire Games. It is a core sport and must be included in the sporting programme of each edition of the Games. Synchronised swimming and Diving events are optional. Water polo is a recognised (i.e. not yet optional) sport.

== Editions ==
Games	Year	Host city	Host country	Best nation
I	1930	Hamilton, Ontario	Canada	England
II	1934	London	England	Canada
III	1938	Sydney, New South Wales	Australia	England
IV	1950	Auckland	New Zealand	Australia
V	1954	Vancouver, British Columbia	Canada	Australia
VI	1958	Cardiff	Wales	Australia
VII	1962	Perth, Western Australia	Australia	Australia
VIII	1966	Kingston	Jamaica	Australia
IX	1970	Edinburgh	Scotland	Australia
X	1974	Christchurch	New Zealand	Australia
XI	1978	Edmonton, Alberta	Canada	Canada
XII	1982	Brisbane, Queensland	Australia	Australia
XIII	1986	Edinburgh	Scotland	Australia
XIV	1990	Auckland	New Zealand	Australia
XV	1994	Victoria, British Columbia	Canada	Australia
XVI	1998	Kuala Lumpur	Malaysia	Australia
XVII	2002	Manchester	England	Australia
XVIII	2006	Melbourne, Victoria	Australia	Australia
XIX	2010	Delhi	India	Australia
XX	2014	Glasgow	Scotland	Australia
XXI	2018	Gold Coast, Queensland	Australia	Australia
XXII	2022	Birmingham	England	Australia
XXIII	2026	Glasgow	Scotland	Australia

== Events ==
=== Men's events ===
Event	30	34	38	50	54	58	62	66	70	74	78	82	86	90	94	98	02	06	10	14	Games
Current program
50 metre freestyle														X	X	X	X	X	X	X	7
100 metre freestyle									X	X	X	X	X	X	X	X	X	X	X	X	12
200 metre freestyle									X	X	X	X	X	X	X	X	X	X	X	X	12
400 metre freestyle									X	X	X	X	X	X	X	X	X	X	X	X	12
1500 metre freestyle									X	X	X	X	X	X	X	X	X	X	X	X	12
50 metre backstroke																	X	X	X	X	4
100 metre backstroke									X	X	X	X	X	X	X	X	X	X	X	X	12
200 metre backstroke									X	X	X	X	X	X	X	X	X	X	X	X	12
50 metre breaststroke																	X	X	X	X	4
100 metre breaststroke									X	X	X	X	X	X	X	X	X	X	X	X	12
200 metre breaststroke									X	X	X	X	X	X	X	X	X	X	X	X	12
50 metre butterfly																	X	X	X	X	4
100 metre butterfly									X	X	X	X	X	X	X	X	X	X	X	X	12
200 metre butterfly									X	X	X	X	X	X	X	X	X	X	X	X	12
200 metre individual medley									X	X	X	X	X	X	X	X	X	X	X	X	12
400 metre individual medley									X	X	X	X	X	X	X	X	X	X	X	X	12
4 × 100 metre freestyle relay									X	X	X	X	X	X	X	X	X	X	X	X	12
4 × 200 metre freestyle relay									X	X	X	X	X	X	X	X	X	X	X	X	12
4 × 100 metre medley relay									X	X	X	X	X	X	X	X	X	X	X	X	12
Past events
100 yard freestyle	X	X																			2
110 yard freestyle			X	X	X	X	X	X													6
440 yard freestyle	X	X	X	X	X	X	X	X													8
1500 yard freestyle	X	X																			2
1650 yard freestyle			X	X	X	X	X	X													6
100 yard backstroke	X	X																			2
110 yard backstroke			X	X	X	X	X	X													6
220 yard backstroke							X	X													2
110 yard breaststroke							X	X													2
200 yard breaststroke		X																			1
220 yard breaststroke	X		X	X	X	X	X	X													7
110 yard butterfly							X	X													2
220 yard butterfly						X	X	X													3
440 yard individual medley							X	X													2
440 yard freestyle relay							X	X													2
800 yard freestyle relay	X	X																			2
880 yard freestyle relay			X	X	X	X	X	X													6
330 yard medley relay		X	X	X	X																4
440 yard medley relay						X	X	X													3
Events	6	7	7	7	7	8	13	13	15	15	15	15	15	16	16	16	19	19	19	19	

=== Women's events ===
Event	30	34	38	50	54	58	62	66	70	74	78	82	86	90	94	98	02	06	10	14	Games
Current program
50 metre freestyle														X	X	X	X	X	X	X	7
100 metre freestyle									X	X	X	X	X	X	X	X	X	X	X	X	12
200 metre freestyle									X	X	X	X	X	X	X	X	X	X	X	X	12
400 metre freestyle									X	X	X	X	X	X	X	X	X	X	X	X	12
800 metre freestyle									X	X	X	X	X	X	X	X	X	X	X	X	12
50 metre backstroke																	X	X	X	X	4
100 metre backstroke									X	X	X	X	X	X	X	X	X	X	X	X	12
200 metre backstroke									X	X	X	X	X	X	X	X	X	X	X	X	12
50 metre breaststroke																	X	X	X	X	4
100 metre breaststroke									X	X	X	X	X	X	X	X	X	X	X	X	12
200 metre breaststroke									X	X	X	X	X	X	X	X	X	X	X	X	12
50 metre butterfly																	X	X	X	X	4
100 metre butterfly									X	X	X	X	X	X	X	X	X	X	X	X	12
200 metre butterfly									X	X	X	X	X	X	X	X	X	X	X	X	12
200 metre individual medley									X	X	X	X	X	X	X	X	X	X	X	X	12
400 metre individual medley									X	X	X	X	X	X	X	X	X	X	X	X	12
4 × 100 metre freestyle relay									X	X	X	X	X	X	X	X	X	X	X	X	12
4 × 200 metre freestyle relay														X	X	X	X	X	X	X	12
4 × 100 metre medley relay									X	X	X	X	X	X	X	X	X	X	X	X	12
Past events
100 yard freestyle	X	X																			2
110 yard freestyle			X	X	X	X	X	X													6
440 yard freestyle	X	X	X	X	X	X	X	X													8
100 yard backstroke	X	X																			2
110 yard backstroke			X	X	X	X	X	X													6
220 yard backstroke							X	X													2
110 yard breaststroke							X	X													2
200 yard breaststroke		X																			1
220 yard breaststroke	X		X	X	X	X	X	X													7
110 yard butterfly						X	X	X													3
220 yard butterfly								X													1
440 yard individual medley							X	X													2
400 yard freestyle relay	X																				1
440 yard freestyle relay			X	X	X	X	X	X													6
330 yard medley relay			X	X	X																3
440 yard medley relay						X	X	X													3
Events	5	4	6	6	6	7	10	11	15	15	15	15	15	16	16	16	19	19	19	19	

=== Elite Athletes with a Disability events ===
From the 2002 Commonwealth Games a number of events have been included in the program to include elite athletes with disabilities. Para swimming have been included in every games since.

Event	02	06	10	14	18	22	Games
Men's 50 metre freestyle multi-disability	X	X					2
Men's 50 metre freestyle S7					X	X	2
Men's 50 metre freestyle S9			X				1
Men's 50 metre freestyle S13						X	1
Men's 100 metre freestyle multi-disability	X	X					2
Men's 100 metre freestyle S8			X				1
Men's 100 metre freestyle S9				X	X		2
Men's 100 metre freestyle S10			X				1
Men's 200 metre freestyle S14				X	X	X	3
Men's 100 metre backstroke S9					X	X	2
Men's 100 metre breaststroke SB8					X	X	2
Men's 100 metre butterfly S10						X	1
Men's 200 metre individual medley SM8				X	X		2
Women's 50 metre freestyle multi-disability	X	X					2
Women's 50 metre freestyle S8					X		1
Women's 50 metre freestyle S9			X				1
Women's 50 metre freestyle S13						X	1
Women's 100 metre freestyle multi-disability	X	X					2
Women's 100 metre freestyle S8				X			1
Women's 100 metre freestyle S9			X		X	X	3
Women's 200 metre freestyle S14						X	1
Women's 100 metre backstroke S8						X	1
Women's 100 metre backstroke S9					X		1
Women's 100 metre breaststroke SB6						X	1
Women's 100 metre breaststroke SB9				X	X		2
Women's 50 metre butterfly S7					X		1
Women's 200 metre individual medley SM10				X	X	X	3
Events	4	4	5	6	12	12	

== All-time medal table ==
Updated after the 2026 Commonwealth Games

Rank	Nation	Gold	Silver	Bronze	Total
1	Australia	368	262	243	873
2	England	117	160	158	435
3	Canada	110	131	136	377
4	South Africa	40	44	39	123
5	Scotland	27	37	44	108
6	New Zealand	26	37	41	104
7	Wales	7	13	21	41
8	Northern Ireland	1	5	5	11
9	Jersey	1	1	0	2
9	Papua New Guinea	1	1	0	2
11	Kenya	1	0	0	1
11	Zimbabwe	1	0	0	1
13	Singapore	0	6	1	7
14	Jamaica	0	3	3	6
15	Malaysia	0	1	1	2
16	Bahamas	0	1	0	1
16	Guyana	0	1	0	1
16	Uganda	0	1	0	1
19	India	0	0	1	1
19	Isle of Man	0	0	1	1
19	Trinidad and Tobago	0	0	1	1
Totals (21 entries)		700	704	695	2,099
