= Swimming at the 2016 Summer Paralympics – Women's 100 metre freestyle S9 =

Women's 100 metre freestyle S9 at the XV Paralympic Games
- Venue: Olympic Aquatics Stadium
- Dates: 12 September 2016
- Competitors: 23 from 15 nations

Medalists
1st place, gold medalist(s)		Michelle Konkoly	United States
2nd place, silver medalist(s)		Sarai Gascon	Spain
3rd place, bronze medalist(s)		Ellie Cole	Australia

The women's 100 metre freestyle S9 event at the 2016 Paralympic Games took place on 12 September 2016, at the Olympic Aquatics Stadium. Three heats were held. The swimmers with the eight fastest times advanced to the final.

== Heats ==
=== Heat 1 ===
11:08 12 September 2016:

Rank	Lane	Name	Nationality	Time	Notes
1	4	Sarai Gascon	Spain	1:03.36	Q
2	5	Nuria Marques Soto	Spain	1:03.82	Q
3	3	Natalie Sims	United States	1:06.33	
4	6	Camille Cruz	Brazil	1:06.49	
5	2	Katarina Roxon	Canada	1:07.19	
6	7	Yuki Morishita	Japan	1:08.38	
7	1	Tupou Neiufi	New Zealand	1:11.21	

=== Heat 2 ===
11:12 12 September 2016:

Rank	Lane	Name	Nationality	Time	Notes
1	4	Ellie Cole	Australia	1:03.40	Q
2	3	Ping Lin	China	1:05.08	Q
3	5	Amy Marren	Great Britain	1:05.63	
4	2	Manon Vermarien	Netherlands	1:06.90	
5	6	Hannah Aspden	United States	1:07.22	
6	1	Anchaya Ketkeaw	Thailand	1:08.34	
7	7	Francesca Secci	Italy	1:09.95	
8	8	Shanntol Ince	Trinidad and Tobago	1:12.41	

=== Heat 3 ===
11:15 12 September 2016:

Rank	Lane	Name	Nationality	Time	Notes
1	4	Michelle Konkoly	United States	1:01.46	Q
2	6	Jialing Xu	China	1:04.74	Q
3	3	Ashleigh McConnell	Australia	1:04.78	Q
4	2	Emily Beecroft	Australia	1:04.90	Q
5	5	Jiexin Wang	China	1:05.23	
6	1	Mei Ichinose	Japan	1:08.77	
7	8	Yulia Gordiychuk	Israel	1:10.51	
8	7	Emily Gray	South Africa	1:10.58	

== Final ==
19:10 12 September 2016:

Rank	Lane	Name	Nationality	Time	Notes
1st place, gold medalist(s)	4	Michelle Konkoly	United States	1:00.91	WR
2nd place, silver medalist(s)	5	Sarai Gascon	Spain	1:02.81	
3rd place, bronze medalist(s)	3	Ellie Cole	Australia	1:02.93	
4	6	Nuria Marques Soto	Spain	1:03.94	
5	2	Jialing Xu	China	1:04.32	
6	1	Emily Beecroft	Australia	1:05.19	
6	7	Ashleigh McConnell	Australia	1:05.19	
8	8	Ping Lin	China	1:06.18	
