= New Zealand at the 1984 Winter Paralympics =

- IPC code: NZL
- NPC: Paralympics New Zealand
- Website: paralympics.org.nz

in Vancouver
- Competitors: 8 in 1 sport
- Medals Ranked 11th: Gold 1 Silver 3 Bronze 1 Total 5

Winter Paralympics appearances (overview)
- 1980; 1984; 1988; 1992; 1994; 1998; 2002; 2006; 2010; 2014; 2018; 2022; 2026

New Zealand competed in the 1984 Winter Paralympics in Innsbruck, Austria. The country was represented by eight athletes (two women and six men), all in alpine skiing. It was the first time New Zealanders won medals at the Winter Paralympic Games. It was also the first time the country fielded female athletes in the Winter Paralympics.

== Medallists ==
Medal	Name	Sport	Event
Gold	Vivienne Martin	Alpine skiing	Women's giant slalom B2
Silver	Vivienne Martin	Alpine skiing	Women's downhill B2
Silver	Vivienne Martin	Alpine skiing	Women's alpine combination B2
Silver	Christopher Orr	Alpine skiing	Men's downhill B1
Bronze	Mark Edwards	Alpine skiing	Men's downhill LW3

== Alpine skiing ==
New Zealand was represented by Ed Bickerstaff, Denis Butler, Martin Clark, Patricia Craig, Mark Edwards, Daryl Gill, Vivienne Martin (Guide Mike Curzon), Christopher Orr (Guide Roger McGarry) and Craig Philip, and obtained five medals. Coach David Boyd, Physiotherapist Kay Shears, Assistant Lorraine Preston(See above)

== See also ==
- New Zealand at the Paralympics
- New Zealand at the 1984 Winter Olympics
