= Swimming at the 2020 Summer Paralympics – Women's 100 metre freestyle S9 =

Women's 100 metre freestyle S9 at the XVI Paralympic Games
- Venue: Tokyo Aquatics Centre
- Dates: 31 August 2021
- Competitors: 20 from 14 nations

Medalists
1st place, gold medalist(s)		Sophie Pascoe	New Zealand
2nd place, silver medalist(s)		Sarai Gascón	Spain
3rd place, bronze medalist(s)		Mariana Ribeiro	Brazil

The Women's 100 metre freestyle S9 event at the 2020 Paralympic Games took place on 31 August 2021, at the Tokyo Aquatics Centre.

== Heats ==
The swimmers with the top eight times, regardless of heat, advanced to the final.

Rank	Heat	Lane	Name	Nationality	Time	Notes
1	1	6	Mariana Ribeiro	Brazil	1:03.56	Q, WR
2	1	4	Toni Shaw	Great Britain	1:03.59	Q
3	3	4	Sophie Pascoe	New Zealand	1:03.75	Q
4	3	5	Ellie Cole	Australia	1:03.84	Q
5	2	4	Sarai Gascón	Spain	1:03.89	Q
6	2	5	Ashleigh McConnell	Australia	1:04.30	Q
7	3	3	Emily Beecroft	Australia	1:04.46	Q
8	3	6	Natalie Sims	United States	1:04.51	Q
9	2	2	Zsófia Konkoly	Hungary	1:04.86	
10	2	3	Susana Veiga	Portugal	1:04.88	
11	1	5	Hannah Aspden	United States	1:05.35	
12	1	3	Xu Jialing	China	1:06.98	
13	3	2	Claire Supiot	France	1:07.31	
14	1	2	Vittoria Bianco	Italy	1:07.32	
15	3	7	Summer Schmit	United States	1:07.71	
16	2	6	Stephanie Millward	Great Britain	1:08.19	
17	3	1	Katarina Roxon	Canada	1:08.24	
18	2	1	Anchaya Ketkeaw	Thailand	1:09.51	
19	2	7	Elena Kliachkina	RPC	1:10.59	
20	1	7	Cecília Jerônimo de Araújo	Brazil	1:16.87	

== Final ==
100m freestyle final
Rank	Lane	Name	Nationality	Time	Notes
1st place, gold medalist(s)	3	Sophie Pascoe	New Zealand	1:02.37	
2nd place, silver medalist(s)	2	Sarai Gascón	Spain	1:02.77	ER
3rd place, bronze medalist(s)	4	Mariana Ribeiro	Brazil	1:03.39	
4	5	Toni Shaw	Great Britain	1:03.42	
5	6	Ellie Cole	Australia	1:03.49	
6	7	Ashleigh McConnell	Australia	1:03.81	
7	8	Natalie Sims	United States	1:03.85	
8	1	Emily Beecroft	Australia	1:04.47	
