= New Zealand at the 2022 Winter Paralympics =

New Zealand at the Winter Paralympics
- IPC code: NZL
- NPC: Paralympics New Zealand
- Website: paralympics.org.nz

in Beijing, China 4–13 March 2022
- Competitors: 3 (3 men) in 1 sport
- Flag bearer (opening): Adam Hall (Note: Hall was hāpai kara, a leadership role equivalent to flagbearer, as the New Zealand athletes did not participate in the opening ceremony.)
- Flag bearer (closing): Corey Peters
- Officials: 4
- Medals Ranked 15th: Gold 1 Silver 1 Bronze 2 Total 4

Winter Paralympics appearances (overview)
- 1980; 1984; 1988; 1992; 1994; 1998; 2002; 2006; 2010; 2014; 2018; 2022; 2026

New Zealand competed at the 2022 Winter Paralympics in Beijing, China, from 4 to 13 March 2022. The New Zealand team consisted of three alpine skiers, all men. Selection of the New Zealand team was the responsibility of Paralympics New Zealand.

None of the New Zealand athletes participated in the opening ceremony, but Adam Hall was named as hāpai kara, a leadership role equivalent to flagbearer. The New Zealand flagbearer at the closing ceremony was Corey Peters.

The New Zealand team won four medals—one gold, one silver, and two bronzes—to finish 15th on the medal table.

== Medallists ==
Medal	Name	Sport	Event	Date
Gold	Corey Peters	Alpine skiing	Men's downhill sitting	5 March
Silver	Corey Peters	Alpine skiing	Men's super-G sitting	6 March
Bronze	Adam Hall	Alpine skiing	Men's super combined standing	7 March
Bronze	Adam Hall	Alpine skiing	Men's slalom standing	13 March

== Competitors ==
Three men alpine skiers were named in the New Zealand team on 2 November 2021: Aaron Ewen, Adam Hall, and Corey Peters.

== Officials ==
Jane Stevens was named as the New Zealand team Chef de Mission on 2 November 2021. Also appointed were Lynette Grace as Deputy Chef de Mission, Ben Adams as head coach and Scott Palmer as assistant coach. Other support staff include Bruce Hamilton (medical lead), Graeme White (performance physiotherapist), and Curtis Christian (wax and equipment technician).

== Alpine skiing ==
Athlete	Event	Run 1	Run 2	Total	
Athlete	Event	Run 1	Run 2	Time	Rank
Aaron Ewen	Men's downhill sitting	1:26.33	—N/a	1:26.33	11
Aaron Ewen	Men's super-G sitting	1:16.04	—N/a	1:16.04	9
Aaron Ewen	Men's super combined sitting	1:16.27	DNF		
Aaron Ewen	Men's giant slalom sitting	1:09.04	DNF		
Aaron Ewen	Men's slalom sitting	52.87	57.29	1:50.16	9
Adam Hall	Men's downhill standing	1:21.18	—N/a	1:21.18	19
Adam Hall	Men's super-G standing	1:15.80	—N/a	1:15.80	21
Adam Hall	Men's super combined standing	1:15.33	39.44	1:54.77	3rd place, bronze medalist(s)
Adam Hall	Men's slalom standing	42.70	50.51	1:33.21	3rd place, bronze medalist(s)
Corey Peters	Men's downhill sitting	1:16.73	—N/a	1:16.73	1st place, gold medalist(s)
Corey Peters	Men's super-G sitting	1:10.16	—N/a	1:10.16	2nd place, silver medalist(s)
Corey Peters	Men's giant slalom sitting	DNF			

== See also ==
- New Zealand at the 2022 Winter Olympics
