= New Zealand at the 2010 Winter Paralympics =

- IPC code: NZL
- NPC: Paralympics New Zealand
- Website: paralympics.org.nz

in Vancouver
- Competitors: 2 in 1 sport
- Flag bearer: Adam Hall
- Officials: 4
- Medals Ranked 15th: Gold 1 Silver 0 Bronze 0 Total 1

Winter Paralympics appearances (overview)
- 1980; 1984; 1988; 1992; 1994; 1998; 2002; 2006; 2010; 2014; 2018; 2022; 2026

New Zealand sent a delegation to take part in the 2010 Winter Paralympics in Vancouver, British Columbia, Canada. The country fielded two athletes, both in alpine skiing.

The country was also represented by four officials - a chef de mission, a coach, an assistant coach and a physiotherapist.

== Medallists ==
Medal	Name	Sport	Event	Date
Gold	Adam Hall	Alpine skiing	Men's slalom, standing	15 March

== Alpine skiing ==
Adam Hall, who has spina bifida and who previously represented New Zealand at the 2006 Winter Paralympics, will compete in the Slalom and Giant slalom.

Peter Williams, who also has spina bifida and will be making his Paralympic Games début, will compete in the slalom, giant slalom and Super G. Unlike his compatriot, he will be using a monoski.

Athlete	Event	Run 1			Run 2			Total		
Athlete	Event	Time	Diff	Rank	Time	Diff	Rank	Time	Diff	Rank
Adam Hall	Slalom standing	0:50.95	0.00	1	0:54.45	+1.85	6	1:45.40	0.00	1st place, gold medalist(s)
Adam Hall	Super-G standing	1:23.34	+3.23	7	—N/a			1:23.34	+3.23	7
Adam Hall	Super combined standing	1:26.44	+5.07	10	50.58	+2.24	4	2:17.02	+5.18	8
Peter Williams	Slalom sitting	57.38	+9.81	25	1:08.2	+19.8	22	2:05.55	+23.92	22
Peter Williams	Giant slalom sitting	1:34.16	+16.35	27	1:37.70	+18.53	22	3:11.86	+34.46	20

== See also ==
- New Zealand at the Paralympics
- New Zealand at the 2010 Winter Olympics
- New Zealand at the 2006 Winter Paralympics
