= New Zealand at the 2026 Winter Paralympics =

- IPC code: NZL
- NPC: Paralympics New Zealand
- Website: paralympics.org.nz

in Milan and Cortina d'Ampezzo, Italy 6–15 March 2026
- Competitors: 2 (2 men) in 1 sport
- Flag bearer (opening): Adam Hall
- Flag bearer (closing): Corey Peters
- Medals Ranked 23rd: Gold 0 Silver 1 Bronze 0 Total 1

Winter Paralympics appearances (overview)
- 1980; 1984; 1988; 1992; 1994; 1998; 2002; 2006; 2010; 2014; 2018; 2022; 2026

New Zealand competed at the 2026 Winter Paralympics in Milan and Cortina d'Ampezzo, Italy, between 6 and 15 March 2026.

== Medallists ==
Medal	Name	Sport	Event	Date
Silver	Adam Hall	Para alpine skiing	Men's slalom standing	15 March

== Competitors ==
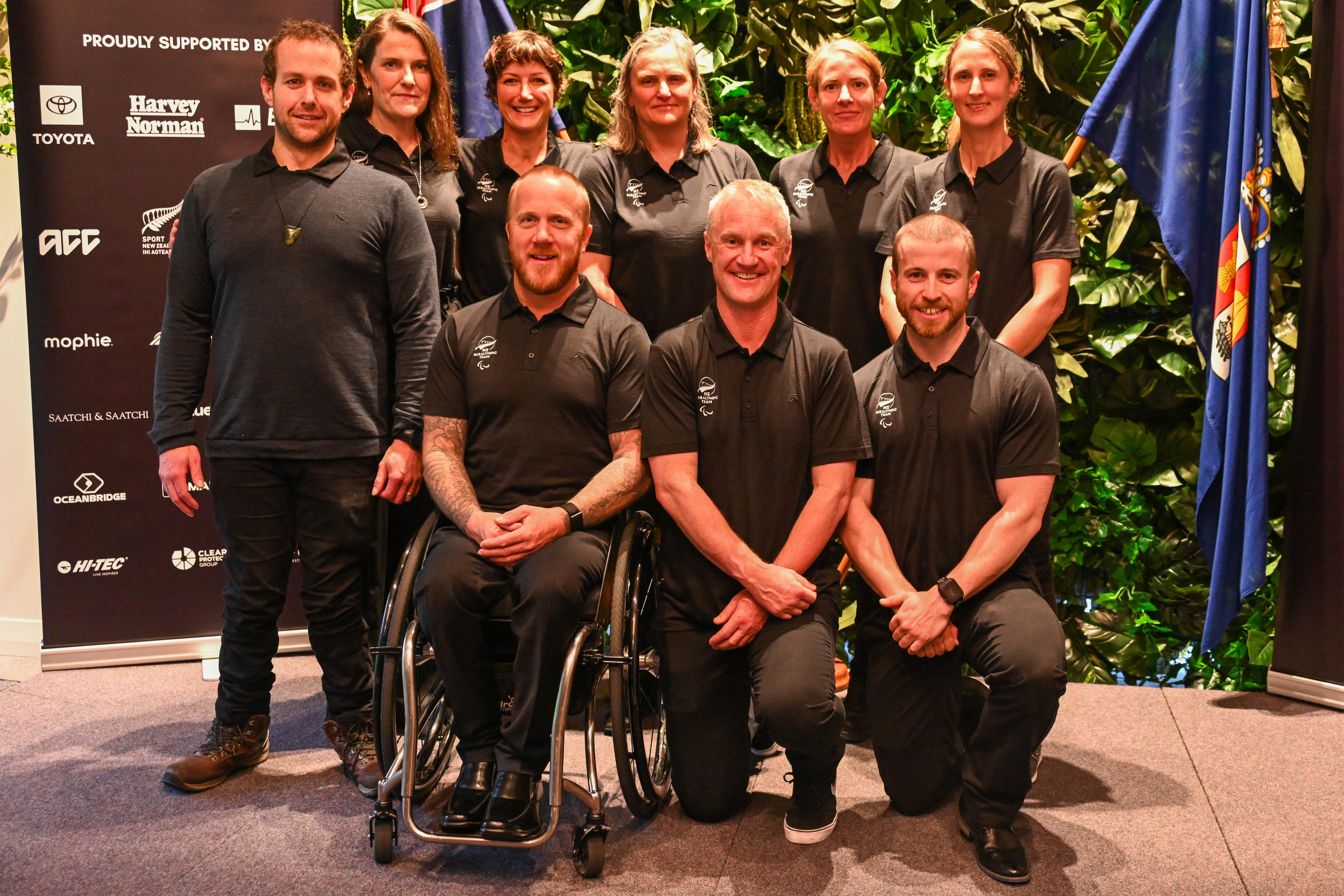
New Zealand competitors and officials for the 2026 Paralympic Winter Games, at a farewell reception at Government House, Auckland, on 22 October 2025. Back row, left to right: Adam Hall; Lynette Grace (deputy chef de mission); Helene Barron (team physiotherapist); Jane Stevens (chef de mission); Sarah de Wattignar (team psychologist); and Julie Milmine (medical and health lead). Front row, left to right: Corey Peters; Daniel Bogue (head coach); and Sam Lynch (assistant coach).

Two alpine skiers, Adam Hall and Corey Peters, were selected for the New Zealand team in July 2025.

== Alpine skiing ==
Athlete	Event	Run 1	Run 2	Total	
Athlete	Event	Run 1	Run 2	Time	Rank
Adam Hall	Men's giant slalom standing	1:15.38	1:14.67	2:30.05	22
Adam Hall	Men's slalom standing	47.80	43.58	1:31.38	2nd place, silver medalist(s)
Corey Peters	Men's downhill sitting	1:20.89	—N/a	1:20.89	5
Corey Peters	Men's super-G sitting	1:15.42	—N/a	1:15.42	6
Corey Peters	Men's giant slalom sitting	1:08.64	1:09.48	2:18.12	5

== Officials ==
Jane Stevens was named as the New Zealand Chef de Mission on 25 March 2025. Other officials include Deputy Chef de Mission Lynette Grace, head coach Daniel Bogue and assistant coach Samuel Lynch.

== See also ==
- New Zealand at the 2026 Winter Olympics
