= New Zealand at the 2014 Winter Paralympics =

- IPC code: NZL
- NPC: Paralympics New Zealand
- Website: paralympics.org.nz

in Sochi
- Competitors: 3 in 1 sport
- Medals Ranked =16th: Gold 0 Silver 1 Bronze 0 Total 1

Winter Paralympics appearances (overview)
- 1980; 1984; 1988; 1992; 1994; 1998; 2002; 2006; 2010; 2014; 2018; 2022; 2026

New Zealand sent a delegation to compete at the 2014 Winter Paralympics in Sochi, Russia, held between 7–16 March 2014. The country continued its streak of competing in every Winter Paralympics since 1984. New Zealand's delegation consisted of three competitors in alpine skiing, one of whom, Corey Peters, won a silver medal in the giant slalom. With one silver medal, the country tied for 16th on the medal table for these Paralympics.

== Background ==
New Zealand first began participating in the Summer Paralympics in 1968, and the Winter Paralympics in 1984. They have participated in every Paralympic Games since those respective debuts. The team New Zealand sent to Sochi included three athletes and seven support staff. The Chef de Mission for the team was Ashley Light. The team had a goal of winning two gold medals. Adam Hall was chosen as the New Zealand flagbearer for the parade of nations during the opening ceremony. Corey Peters was selected as the flagbearer for the closing ceremony.

== Disability classification ==
Every participant at the Paralympics has their disability grouped into one of five disability categories; amputation, the condition may be congenital or sustained through injury or illness; cerebral palsy; wheelchair athletes, there is often overlap between this and other categories; visual impairment, including blindness; or Les autres. Les autres includes+ any physical disability that does not fall strictly under one of the other categories, for example dwarfism or multiple sclerosis. Each Paralympic sport then has its own classifications, dependent upon the specific physical demands of competition. Events are given a code, made of numbers and letters, describing the type of event and classification of the athletes competing. Events with "B" in the code are for athletes with visual impairment, codes LW1 to LW9 are for athletes who stand to compete and LW10 to LW12 are for athletes who compete sitting down. Alpine skiing events grouped athletes into separate competitions for sitting, standing and visually impaired athletes.

== Alpine skiing ==
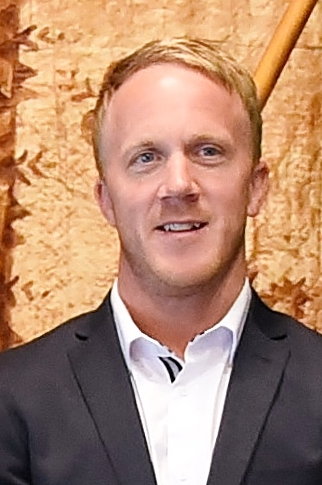
Corey Peters won the silver medal in the giant slalom, sitting.

Adam Hall was born with spina bifida; he said he considers himself "lucky" because he is able to stand with this condition, when most people that have it must use a wheelchair. He won a gold medal at the 2010 Winter Paralympics in the slalom event. He competed in three events. In the men's super-G he did not finish the single-run race. In the Slalom, he was inside the top 10 for both heats, finishing with a combined time of one minute and 44 seconds, good enough for 7th place. In the Super combined he finished 4th, his time was a mere 24 hundredths of a second out of bronze medal position.

Corey Peters was paralyzed as a result of a motocross injury in September 2009. He participates in the sitting category of events, and took part in four events in Sochi. In the Super-G he finished in 6th place. In the Super Combined, he finished fourth with a time of 2 minutes, 21 seconds; 1.91 seconds behind the bronze medalist. After placing 16th in the first run of the slalom, he failed to finish the second leg of the event. In the giant slalom, he led the race after the first run with a time of 1 minute 18 seconds. Despite being faster in the second run, the field was also faster in general, and he had to settle for the silver medal, being less than half a second behind the gold medal time.

Athlete	Event	Run 1			Run 2			Final/Total		
Athlete	Event	Time	Diff	Rank	Time	Diff	Rank	Time	Diff	Rank
Adam Hall	Super-G, standing	—N/a						DNF		
Adam Hall	Combined, standing	53.00	+2.70	4	1:21.36	+2.97	5	2:14.36	+4.64	4
Adam Hall	Slalom, standing	50.71	+3.02	7	53.54	+2.26	5	1:44.25	+5.28	7
Corey Peters	Super-G, sitting	—N/a						1:26.17	+6.66	6
Corey Peters	Combined, sitting	1:03.24	+4.53	6	1:18.67	+0.40	2	2:21.91	+3.71	4
Corey Peters	Slalom, sitting	59.95	+7.21	16	DNF					
Corey Peters	Giant slalom, sitting	1:18.10	NA	1	1:15.10	+1.00	6	2:33.20	+0.47	2nd place, silver medalist(s)

=== Snowboarding ===
For the 2014 Winter Paralympics, snowboard cross was considered a discipline of Alpine skiing, rather than a separate sport. Snowboarding was offered only for athletes who competed in a standing position. The men's snowboard cross event was held on 14 March 2014. Carl Murphy has been a below-the-knee amputee in one leg since birth. He finished his first two runs in fourth place. Only the two best runs for each competitor counted, but with the chance to improve into the medal podium positions, he fell three times on his third and final run. His first two runs were good enough for him to hold fourth place.

Men

Athlete	Event	Race 1		Race 2		Race 3		Total	
Athlete	Event	Time	Rank	Time	Rank	Time	Rank	Time	Rank
Carl Murphy	Snowboard cross	54.62	4	54.48	4	DSQ		1:49.10	4

== See also ==
- New Zealand at the Paralympics
- New Zealand at the 2014 Winter Olympics
