= New Zealand at the 2018 Winter Paralympics =

- IPC code: NZL
- NPC: Paralympics New Zealand
- Website: paralympics.org.nz

in PyeongChang
- Competitors: 3 in 2 sports
- Flag bearer (opening): Corey Peters
- Flag bearer (closing): Adam Hall
- Medals Ranked =16th: Gold 1 Silver 0 Bronze 2 Total 3

Winter Paralympics appearances (overview)
- 1980; 1984; 1988; 1992; 1994; 1998; 2002; 2006; 2010; 2014; 2018; 2022; 2026

New Zealand competed at the 2018 Winter Paralympics in PyeongChang, South Korea, with a team of three athletes competing in two sports.

== Medallists ==
Medal	Name	Sport	Event	Date
Gold	Adam Hall	Alpine skiing	Men's slalom, standing	17 March
Bronze	Corey Peters	Alpine skiing	Men's downhill, sitting	10 March
Bronze	Adam Hall	Alpine skiing	Men's super combined, standing	13 March

== Events ==
=== Alpine skiing ===
Men's

Athlete	Event	Int/Run 1			Int/Run 2			Int/Run 3			Final/Total		
Athlete	Event	Time	Diff	Rank	Time	Diff	Rank	Time	Diff	Rank	Time	Diff	Rank
Adam Hall	Downhill standing	15.78	-0.01	4	38.98	+0.61	3	51.84	+0.85	5	1:27.52	+2.07	5
Adam Hall	Super-G standing	5.18	-0.14	2	32.97	+1.59	7	49.97	+3.40	10	1:29.86	+5.03	10
Adam Hall	Super combined standing	1:29.06	+4.16	7	46.26	+1.32	3	—N/a			2:15.32	+4.76	3rd place, bronze medalist(s)
Adam Hall	Slalom standing	48.69	+0.18	=3	47.42	0.00	1	—N/a			1:36.11	0.00	1st place, gold medalist(s)
Corey Peters	Downhill sitting	15.45	+0.28	5	38.83	+1.69	6	51.23	+1.65	2	1:26.01	+1.90	3rd place, bronze medalist(s)
Corey Peters	Super-G sitting	5.57	+0.14	=28	33.35	+0.92	18	50.26	+1.63	17	1:28.80	+2.97	11
Corey Peters	Super combined sitting	Did not start											
Corey Peters	Giant slalom sitting	1:11.07	+4.77	12	1:09.16	+3.19	10	—N/a			2:20.23	+6.78	10

=== Snowboarding ===
Men's

Banked slalom

Athlete	Event	Run 1		Run 2		Run 3		Best	
Athlete	Event	Time	Rank	Time	Rank	Time	Rank	Time	Final Rank
Carl Murphy	Snowboard banked slalom	52.00	5	51.80	5	50.21	5	50.21	5

Cross

Athlete	Event	Seeding						1/8 final	Quarterfinal	Semifinal	Final	
Athlete	Event	Run 1		Run 2		Best	Seed	1/8 final	Quarterfinal	Semifinal	Final	
Athlete	Event	Time	Rank	Time	Rank	Best	Seed	Position	Position	Position	Position	Rank
Carl Murphy	Snowboard cross	1:00.08	5	1:06.15	13	1.00.08	7 Q	1 Q	2	Did not advance		

== See also ==
- New Zealand at the 2018 Winter Olympics
