= Swimming at the 2018 Commonwealth Games – Women's 100 metre breaststroke SB9 =

Women's 100 metre breaststroke SB9 at the 2018 Commonwealth Games
- Venue: Gold Coast Aquatic Centre
- Dates: 9 April 2018
- Competitors: 7 from 4 nations
- Winning time: 1:18.09

Medalists
gold medal	Sophie Pascoe	New Zealand
silver medal	Paige Leonhardt	Australia
bronze medal	Madeleine Scott	Australia

The Women's 100 metre breaststroke SB9 event at the 2018 Commonwealth Games was held on 9 April at the Gold Coast Aquatic Centre.

== Schedule ==
The schedule is as follows:

All times are Australian Eastern Standard Time (UTC+10)

Date	Time	Round
Monday 9 April 2018	6:54	Qualifying
Monday 9 April 2018	15:52	Final

== Results ==
=== Heats ===
Rank	Lane	Name	Nationality	Time	Notes
1	6	Sophie Pascoe	New Zealand	1:17.92	Q
2	5	Paige Leonhardt	Australia	1:19.87	Q
3	4	Madeleine Scott	Australia	1:21.31	Q
4	2	Sarah Girard	Canada	1:25.07	Q
5	7	Katarina Roxon	Canada	1:25.75	Q
6	3	Jasmine Greenwood	Australia	1:26.61	Q
7	1	Toni Shaw	Scotland	1:29.94	Q

=== Final ===
Rank	Lane	Name	Nationality	Time	Notes
1st place, gold medalist(s)	4	Sophie Pascoe	New Zealand	1:18.09	
2nd place, silver medalist(s)	5	Paige Leonhardt	Australia	1:18.81	
3rd place, bronze medalist(s)	3	Madeleine Scott	Australia	1:19.98	
4	6	Sarah Girard	Canada	1:23.82	
5	7	Jasmine Greenwood	Australia	1:25.23	
6	2	Katarina Roxon	Canada	1:26.18	
7	1	Toni Shaw	Scotland	1:27.99	
