= New Zealand at the 2002 Winter Paralympics =

- IPC code: NZL
- NPC: Paralympics New Zealand
- Website: paralympics.org.nz

in Salt Lake City
- Medals Ranked 10th: Gold 4 Silver 0 Bronze 2 Total 6

Winter Paralympics appearances (overview)
- 1980; 1984; 1988; 1992; 1994; 1998; 2002; 2006; 2010; 2014; 2018; 2022; 2026

New Zealand won 6 medals at the 2002 Winter Paralympics: 4 golds, 0 silver and 2 bronze medals.

== See also ==
- New Zealand at the Paralympics
