= Swimming at the 2022 Commonwealth Games – Women's 100 metre freestyle S9 =

Women's 100 metre freestyle S9 at the 2022 Commonwealth Games
- Venue: Sandwell Aquatics Centre
- Dates: 29 July 2022
- Competitors: 9 from 6 nations
- Winning time: 1:02.95

Medalists
gold medal	Sophie Pascoe	New Zealand
silver medal	Emily Beecroft	Australia
bronze medal	Toni Shaw	Scotland

The Women's 100 metre freestyle S9 event at the 2022 Commonwealth Games was held on 29 July at the Sandwell Aquatics Centre.

== Schedule ==
The schedule is as follows:

All times are British Summer Time (UTC+1)

Date	Time	Round
Friday 29 July 2022	11:17	Heats
Friday 29 July 2022	19:54	Final

== Results ==
=== Heats ===
Rank	Heat	Lane	Name	Nationality	Time	Notes
1	2	4	Sophie Pascoe	New Zealand	1:03.38	Q
2	1	4	Toni Shaw	Scotland	1:04.28	Q
3	2	5	Ellie Cole	Australia	1:04.87	Q
4	2	3	Emily Beecroft	Australia	1:05.93	Q
5	1	5	Ashleigh McConnell	Australia	1:06.76	Q
6	2	6	Katarina Roxon	Canada	1:07.26	Q
7	1	3	Alice Tai	England	1:09.72	Q
8	1	6	Tupou Neiufi	New Zealand	1:15.97	Q
9	2	2	Husnah Kukundakwe	Uganda	1:19.01	R

=== Final ===
Rank	Lane	Name	Nationality	Time	Notes
1st place, gold medalist(s)	4	Sophie Pascoe	New Zealand	1:02.95	
2nd place, silver medalist(s)	6	Emily Beecroft	Australia	1:03.74	
3rd place, bronze medalist(s)	5	Toni Shaw	Scotland	1:03.75	
4	7	Ashleigh McConnell	Australia	1:04.12	
5	3	Ellie Cole	Australia	1:04.21	
6	1	Alice Tai	England	1:07.10	
7	2	Katarina Roxon	Canada	1:07.13	
8	8	Tupou Neiufi	New Zealand	1:14.91	
