= New Zealand at the 1980 Winter Paralympics =

- IPC code: NZL
- NPC: Paralympics New Zealand
- Website: paralympics.org.nz

in Geilo
- Competitors: 3 in 1 sport
- Medals Ranked =11th: Gold 0 Silver 0 Bronze 0 Total 0

Winter Paralympics appearances (overview)
- 1980; 1984; 1988; 1992; 1994; 1998; 2002; 2006; 2010; 2014; 2018; 2022; 2026

New Zealand made its Winter Paralympic Games début in the 1980 Winter Paralympics in Geilo, Norway. The country was represented by three athletes, all in alpine skiing. They did not win any medals.

== Alpine skiing ==
Peter Baddeley, Ed Nichols and Craig Philip represented New Zealand in alpine skiing.

== See also ==
- New Zealand at the Paralympics
- New Zealand at the 1980 Winter Olympics
