= New Zealand at the Paralympics =

- IPC code: NZL
- NPC: Paralympics New Zealand
- Website: paralympics.org.nz
- Medals Ranked 27th: Gold 98 Silver 71 Bronze 76 Total 245

Summer appearances
- 1968; 1972; 1976; 1980; 1984; 1988; 1992; 1996; 2000; 2004; 2008; 2012; 2016; 2020; 2024

Winter appearances
- 1980; 1984; 1988; 1992; 1994; 1998; 2002; 2006; 2010; 2014; 2018; 2022; 2026

New Zealand has sent delegations to the Summer Paralympics since 1968, and to the Winter Paralympics since 1980. The Paralympic Games are a multi-sport event for athletes with physical and sensorial disabilities. This includes athletes with mobility disabilities, amputations, blindness, and cerebral palsy. The Paralympic Games are held every four years, following the Olympic Games, and are governed by the International Paralympic Committee (IPC).

== Medals ==
=== Medals by Summer Games ===
Games	Gold	Silver	Bronze	Total
1968 Tel-Aviv	1	2	1	4
1972 Heidelberg	3	3	3	9
1976 Toronto	7	1	5	13
1980 Arnhem	7	6	6	19
1984 Stoke Mandeville/New York	8	10	7	25
1988 Seoul	2	4	11	17
1992 Barcelona	5	1	0	6
1996 Atlanta	9	6	3	18
2000 Sydney	6	8	4	18
2004 Athens	6	1	3	10
2008 Beijing	5	3	4	12
2012 London	6	7	4	17
2016 Rio de Janeiro	9	5	7	21
2020 Tokyo	6	3	3	12
2024 Paris	1	4	4	9
Totals (15 entries)	81	64	65	210

=== Medals by Winter Games ===
Games	Gold	Silver	Bronze	Total
1980 Geilo	0	0	0	0
1984 Innsbruck	1	3	1	5
1988 Innsbruck	0	1	0	1
1992 Tignes-Albertsville	2	0	0	2
1994 Lillehammer	3	0	3	6
1998 Nagano	4	1	1	6
2002 Salt Lake City	4	0	2	6
2006 Turin	0	0	0	0
2010 Vancouver	1	0	0	1
2014 Sochi	0	1	0	1
2018 PyeongChang	1	0	2	3
2022 Beijing	1	1	2	4
2026 Milano Cortina	0	1	0	1
Totals (13 entries)	17	8	11	36

=== Medals by Summer Sport ===
Games	Gold	Silver	Bronze	Total
Archery	1	1	0	2
Athletics	38	33	29	100
Boccia	0	1	0	1
Cycling	2	4	8	14
Dartchery	0	1	0	1
Equestrian	1	1	0	2
Lawn Bowls	1	0	1	2
Paracanoeing	0	0	1	1
Shooting	1	0	4	5
Swimming	30	20	16	66
Weightlifting	0	0	2	2
Wheelchair Rugby	1	0	1	2
Total	75	61	62	198

=== Medals by Winter Sport ===
Games	Gold	Silver	Bronze	Total
Alpine skiing	17	7	10	34
Total	17	7	10	34

=== Top medallists ===
The following competitors have won at least three gold medals, or at least one gold medal and five medals overall

Name	Gold	Silver	Bronze	Total
Sophie Pascoe	11	7	1	19
Eve Rimmer	8	5	1	14
Jenny Newstead	7	2	1	10
Peter Martin	4	1	2	7
Patrick Cooper	4	1	1	6
Duane Kale	4	1	1	6
Dennis Miller	4	0	1	5
Matthew Butson	3	1	0	4
Anna Grimaldi	3	0	1	4
Rachael Battersby	3	0	0	3
Cameron Leslie	3	0	0	3
Patricia Hill	2	3	3	8
Graham Condon	2	2	2	6
Mary Fisher	2	2	1	5
Roly Crichton	1	3	2	6
Laura Thompson (pilot)	1	2	2	5

== See also ==
- List of New Zealand Paralympians
- New Zealand at the Olympics
