= Swimming at the 2014 Commonwealth Games – Women's 100 metre breaststroke SB9 =

Women's 100 metre breaststroke SB9 at the 2014 Commonwealth Games
- Venue: Tollcross International Swimming Centre
- Dates: 27 July 2014
- Competitors: 7 from 4 nations
- Winning time: 1:19.36

Medalists
gold medal	Sophie Pascoe	New Zealand
silver medal	Madeleine Scott	Australia
bronze medal	Erraid Davies	Scotland

The women's 100 metre breaststroke SB9 event at the 2014 Commonwealth Games as part of the swimming programme took place on 27 July at the Tollcross International Swimming Centre in Glasgow, Scotland.

The medals were presented by Mohamed Abdul Sattar, president of the Swimming Association of Maldives and the quaichs were presented by Vivian Gungaram, secretary general of the Mauritius Olympic Committee.

== Records ==
Prior to this competition, the existing world and Commonwealth Games records were as follows.

World record	Jessica Sloan (CAN)	1:16.93	Sydney, Australia	24 October 2000
Commonwealth record				
Games record	N/A	N/A	N/A	N/A

== Results ==
=== Heats ===
Rank	Heat	Lane	Name	Nationality	Time	Notes
1	1	4	Sophie Pascoe	New Zealand	1:19.71	Q
2	1	7	Erraid Davies	Scotland	1:22.08	Q
3	1	6	Madeleine Scott	Australia	1:22.28	Q
4	1	2	Aurelie Rivard	Canada	1:23.67	Q
5	1	5	Katherine Downie	Australia	1:24.23	Q
6	1	3	Katarina Roxon	Canada	1:25.37	Q
7	1	1	Nikita Howarth	New Zealand	1:33.15	Q

=== Finals ===
Rank	Lane	Name	Nationality	Time	Notes
1st place, gold medalist(s)	4	Sophie Pascoe	New Zealand	1:19.36	
2nd place, silver medalist(s)	3	Madeleine Scott	Australia	1:21.38	
3rd place, bronze medalist(s)	5	Erraid Davies	Scotland	1:21.68	
4	6	Aurelie Rivard	Canada	1:22.30	
5	7	Katarina Roxon	Canada	1:23.95	
6	2	Katherine Downie	Australia	1:24.04	
7	1	Nikita Howarth	New Zealand	1:33.21	
