= New Zealand at the 1998 Winter Paralympics =

- IPC code: NZL
- NPC: Paralympics New Zealand
- Website: paralympics.org.nz

in Nagano
- Medals Ranked 11th: Gold 4 Silver 1 Bronze 1 Total 6

Winter Paralympics appearances (overview)
- 1980; 1984; 1988; 1992; 1994; 1998; 2002; 2006; 2010; 2014; 2018; 2022; 2026

New Zealand won 6 medals at the 1998 Winter Paralympics: 4 golds, 1 silver and 1 bronze medals.

== See also ==
- New Zealand at the Paralympics
