= New Zealand at the 1988 Winter Paralympics =

- IPC code: NZL
- NPC: Paralympics New Zealand
- Website: paralympics.org.nz

in Innsbruck
- Medals Ranked 13th: Gold 0 Silver 1 Bronze 0 Total 1

Winter Paralympics appearances (overview)
- 1980; 1984; 1988; 1992; 1994; 1998; 2002; 2006; 2010; 2014; 2018; 2022; 2026

New Zealand won 1 medal at the 1988 Winter Paralympics: 0 golds, 1 silver and 0 bronze medals.

== See also ==
- New Zealand at the Paralympics
