= New Zealand at the 1992 Winter Paralympics =

- IPC code: NZL
- NPC: Paralympics New Zealand
- Website: paralympics.org.nz

in Tignes-Albertville
- Medals Ranked 11th: Gold 2 Silver 0 Bronze 0 Total 2

Winter Paralympics appearances (overview)
- 1980; 1984; 1988; 1992; 1994; 1998; 2002; 2006; 2010; 2014; 2018; 2022; 2026

New Zealand won 2 medals at the 1992 Winter Paralympics: 2 golds, 0 silver and 0 bronze medals.

== See also ==
- New Zealand at the Paralympics
- New Zealand at the Olympics
