= Swimming at the 2014 Commonwealth Games – Women's 200 metre individual medley SM10 =

Women's 200 metre individual medley SM10 at the 2014 Commonwealth Games
- Venue: Tollcross International Swimming Centre
- Dates: 29 July 2014
- Competitors: 5 from 3 nations
- Winning time: 2:27.74

Medalists
gold medal	Sophie Pascoe	New Zealand
silver medal	Katherine Downie	Australia
bronze medal	Aurelie Rivard	Canada

The women's 200 metre individual medley SM10 event at the 2014 Commonwealth Games as part of the swimming programme took place on 29 July at the Tollcross International Swimming Centre in Glasgow, Scotland.

The medals were presented by Sam Ramsamy, vice president of FINA and the quaichs were presented by Adam Paker, chief executive officer of Commonwealth Games England.

== Records ==
Prior to this competition, the existing world and Commonwealth Games records were as follows.

World record	Sophie Pascoe (NZL)	2:25.65	London, United Kingdom	30 August 2012
Commonwealth record				
Games record	N/A	N/A	N/A	N/A

== Results ==
=== Heats ===
Rank	Heat	Lane	Name	Nationality	Time	Notes
1	1	4	Sophie Pascoe	New Zealand	2:30.12	Q
2	1	5	Aurelie Rivard	Canada	2:33.46	Q
3	1	3	Katherine Downie	Australia	2:36.76	Q
4	1	6	Madeleine Scott	Australia	2:44.90	Q
5	1	2	Katarina Roxon	Canada	2:45.98	Q

=== Finals ===
Rank	Lane	Name	Nationality	Time	Notes
1st place, gold medalist(s)	4	Sophie Pascoe	New Zealand	2:27.74	
2nd place, silver medalist(s)	3	Katherine Downie	Australia	2:31.98	
3rd place, bronze medalist(s)	5	Aurelie Rivard	Canada	2:32.09	
4	6	Madeleine Scott	Australia	2:40.61	
5	2	Katarina Roxon	Canada	2:43.19	
