= Swimming at the 2018 Commonwealth Games – Women's 100 metre freestyle S9 =

Event at the 2018 Commonwealth Games

Women's 100 metre freestyle S9 at the 2018 Commonwealth Games
- Venue: Gold Coast Aquatic Centre
- Dates: 8 April 2018
- Competitors: 8 from 4 nations
- Winning time: 1:03.02

Medalists
| gold medal | Lakeisha Patterson | Australia |
| silver medal | Alice Tai | England |
| bronze medal | Ellie Cole | Australia |

The Women's 100 metre freestyle S9 event at the 2018 Commonwealth Games was held on 8 April at the Gold Coast Aquatic Centre.

== Schedule ==
The schedule was as follows:

All times are Australian Eastern Standard Time (UTC+10)

| Date | Time | Round |
|---|---|---|
| Sunday 8 April 2018 | 6:49 | Qualifying |
| Sunday 8 April 2018 | 16:06 | Final |

== Results ==
=== Heats ===
| Rank | Lane | Name | Nationality | Time | Notes |
|---|---|---|---|---|---|
| 1 | 4 | Ellie Cole | Australia | 1:03.98 | Q |
| 2 | 6 | Emily Beecroft | Australia | 1:04.64 | Q |
| 3 | 3 | Lakeisha Patterson | Australia | 1:05.66 | Q |
| 4 | 5 | Alice Tai | England | 1:06.88 | Q |
| 5 | 7 | Katarina Roxon | Canada | 1:07.84 | Q |
| 6 | 2 | Toni Shaw | Scotland | 1:08.00 | Q |
| 7 | 1 | Morgan Bird | Canada | 1:09.76 | Q |
| 8 | 8 | Abigail Tripp | Canada | 1:10.47 | Q |

=== Final ===
| Rank | Lane | Name | Nationality | Time | Notes |
|---|---|---|---|---|---|
| 1st place, gold medalist(s) | 3 | Lakeisha Patterson | Australia | 1:03.02 | |
| 2nd place, silver medalist(s) | 6 | Alice Tai | England | 1:03.07 | |
| 3rd place, bronze medalist(s) | 4 | Ellie Cole | Australia | 1:03.36 | |
| 4 | 5 | Emily Beecroft | England | 1:03.76 | |
| 5 | 7 | Toni Shaw | Scotland | 1:04.19 | |
| 6 | 2 | Katarina Roxon | Scotland | 1:08.18 | |
| 7 | 8 | Abigail Tripp | Canada | 1:09.43 | |
| 8 | 1 | Morgan Bird | Canada | 1:09.85 | |
