= New Zealand at the 2006 Winter Paralympics =

- IPC code: NZL
- NPC: Paralympics New Zealand
- Website: paralympics.org.nz

in Turin
- Competitors: 2 in 1 sport
- Medals Ranked =20th: Gold 0 Silver 0 Bronze 0 Total 0

Winter Paralympics appearances (overview)
- 1980; 1984; 1988; 1992; 1994; 1998; 2002; 2006; 2010; 2014; 2018; 2022; 2026

New Zealand participated in the ninth Winter Paralympics in Turin, Italy.

New Zealand entered two athletes in the following sports:

- Alpine skiing: 2 male

== Medalists ==
	(gold)	(silver)	(bronze)	Total
New Zealand	0	0	0	0

== See also ==
- 2006 Winter Paralympics
- New Zealand at the 2006 Winter Olympics
