= Swimming at the 2020 Summer Paralympics – Women's 100 metre backstroke S8 =

Women's 100 metre backstroke S8 at the XVI Paralympic Games
- Venue: Tokyo Aquatics Centre
- Dates: 27 August 2021
- Competitors: 7 from 6 nations

Medalists
| 1st place, gold medalist(s) | | Tupou Neiufi | New Zealand |
| 2nd place, silver medalist(s) | | Kateryna Denysenko | Ukraine |
| 3rd place, bronze medalist(s) | | Jessica Long | United States |

The Women's 100 metre backstroke S8 event at the 2020 Paralympic Games took place on 27 August 2021, at the Tokyo Aquatics Centre.

== Final ==
100m backstroke final
| Rank | Lane | Name | Nationality | Time | Notes |
|---|---|---|---|---|---|
| 1st place, gold medalist(s) | 5 | Tupou Neiufi | New Zealand | 1:16.84 | |
| 2nd place, silver medalist(s) | 6 | Kateryna Denysenko | Ukraine | 1:18.31 | |
| 3rd place, bronze medalist(s) | 3 | Jessica Long | United States | 1:18.55 | |
| 4 | 2 | Xenia Francesca Palazzo | Italy | 1:20.90 | |
| 5 | 1 | Mira Jeanne Maack | Germany | 1:22.77 | |
| 6 | 7 | Mariia Pavlova | RPC | 1:23.24 | |
| | 4 | Viktoriia Ishchiulova | RPC | DNS | |
