= 2018 World Para Swimming European Championships – Women's 100 metres butterfly =

The women's 100 metres butterfly at the 2018 World Para Swimming European Championships was held at the National Aquatic Centre in Dublin from 13 to 19 August. 5 classification finals were held in all over this event.

== Medalists ==
Event	Gold		Silver		Bronze	
S8	Alice Tai (GBR)	1:10.51	Kateryna Denysenko (UKR)	1:16.90	Cleo Keijzer (NED)	1:19.17
S9	Sarai Gascon (ESP)	1:08.21	Toni Shaw (GBR)	1:09.18	Nuria Marques Soto (ESP)	1:10.40
S10	Lisa Kruger (NED)	1:07.82	Oliwia Jablonska (POL)	1:07.86	Alessia Scortechini (ITA)	1:08.25
S12	Alessia Berra (ITA)	1:06.43	Maria Delgado Nadal (ESP)	1:08.34	Elena Krawzow (GER)	1:09.17
S14	Jessica-Jane Applegate (GBR)	1:04.13 WR	Bethany Firth (GBR)	1:05.43	Louise Fiddes (GBR)	1:05.47
WR world record | AR area record | CR championship record | GR games record | NR national record | OR Olympic record | PB personal best | SB season best | WL world leading (in a given season)

== See also ==
- List of IPC world records in swimming
