= Katherine Downie =

Australian Paralympic swimmer

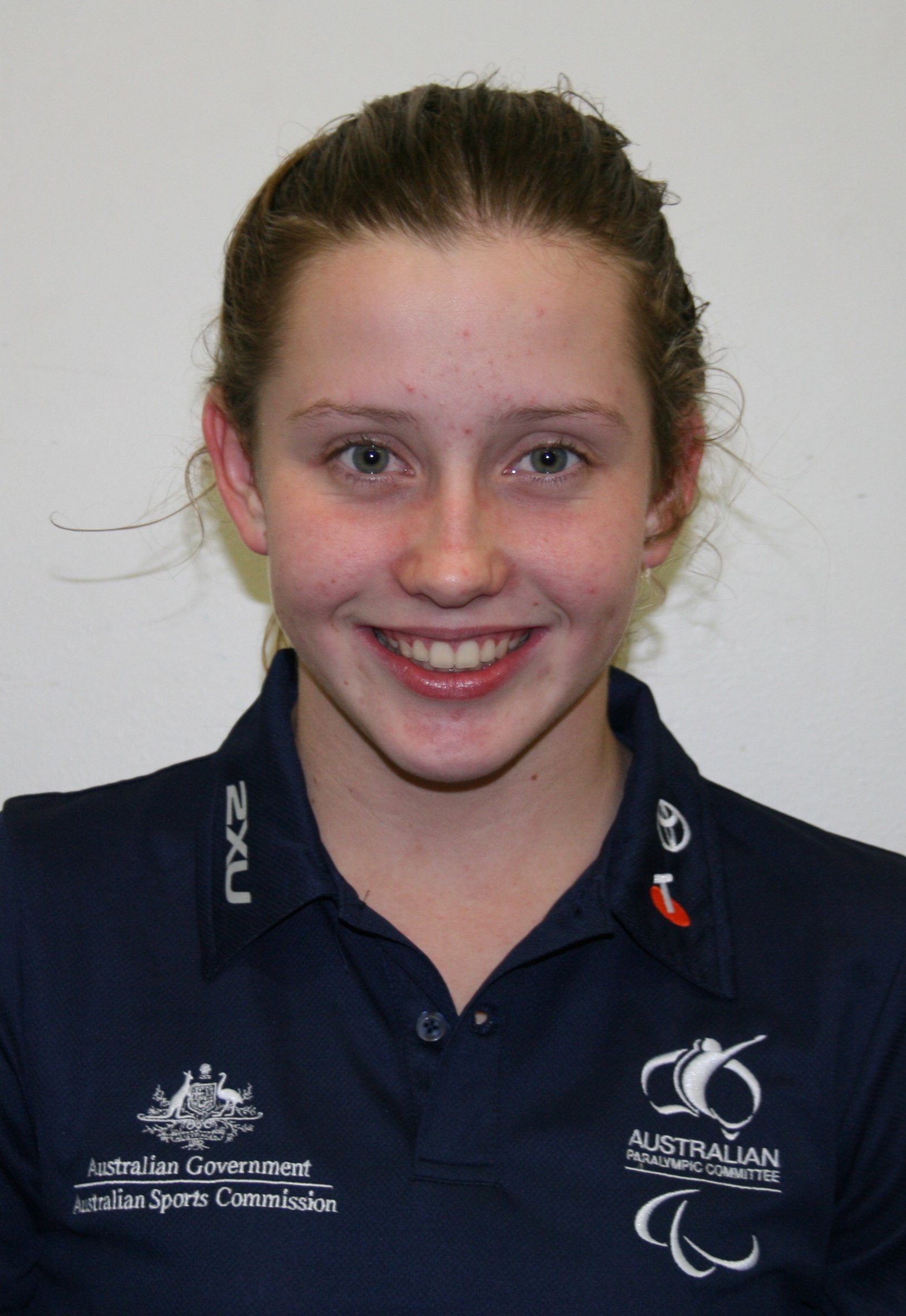
- 2012 Australian Paralympic team portrait of Downie

Personal information
- Full name: Katherine Rose Downie
- Nickname: Kat
- Nationality: Australia
- Born: 12 January 1996 (age 30) Aberdeen, Scotland

Sport
- Sport: Swimming
- Strokes: Backstroke, freestyle
- Classifications: S10, SB9, SM10
- Club: Perth City Swim Club
- Coach: Matt Magee
Medal record
Women's paralympic swimming
Representing Australia
Paralympic Games
Gold medal – first place	2012 London	4×100 m freestyle
Gold medal – first place	2012 London	4×100 m medley
World Championships (LC)
Silver medal – second place	2013 Montreal	200 m medley SM10
Bronze medal – third place	2013 Montreal	100 m backstroke S10
Commonwealth Games
Silver medal – second place	2014 Glasgow	200 m medley SM10
Bronze medal – third place	2018 Gold Coast	200 m medley SM10

Katherine Rose Downie OAM (born 12 January 1996) is an Australian Paralympian. Kat first represented Australia in 2011. Kat represented Australia at the 2012 Summer Paralympics in swimming and was a member of both the Gold medal Women's 34 point 4 x 100 free and 4 × 100 medley relay teams. Kat placed fourth in both her pet events the 100 backstroke and 200IM.

Katherine lives with mild right hemiplegic spastic cerebral palsy and is an Australian S10 classified swimmer.

== Personal ==
Downie was born on 12 January 1996 in Aberdeen, Scotland. She has right hemiplegia spastic cerebral palsy", a condition she has had since birth. As of 2012, Katherine is an Architecture student at Curtin University.

== Swimming ==
Downie is an S10 classified swimmer. She is a member of the Perth City Swim Club, and is coached by Matt Magee. She has set three world records, all at the 2011 Australian National Open Short Course Championships. The records were for the 100m freestyle, 50m butterfly and 50m backstroke events.

Downie learned to swim as a baby/toddler in Aberdeen Scotland. She became a competitive swimmer in 2007 when she was ten years old. She first represented Australia in an international competition in 2011. She competed at the 2011 Arafura Games. She participated in the 2012 Australian Swimming Championships/London Olympic Trials in Australia as a sixteen-year-old. She finished second in the 200m individual medley event with a time of 2.34.21. She had a personal best time of 1.02.88 in the 100m freestyle, personal best time of 29.03 in the 50m freestyle, and personal best time of 32.04 in the 50m butterfly. In the women's 50m backstroke multi class event, she finished second with a time of 33.62. She was selected to represent Australia at the 2012 Summer Paralympics. She attended a Paralympic farewell ceremony at Perth's State Basketball Centre in late July. She competed in nine events and won two gold medals as a member of the Women's 4 × 100 m Freestyle and 4 × 100 m Medley Relay (34 points) teams.

Competing at the 2013 IPC Swimming World Championships in Montreal, Quebec, Canada, she won a silver medal in the Women's 200 m Individual Medley SM10 and bronze medal in the Women's 100 m Backstroke S10.

She was awarded an Order of Australia Medal in the 2014 Australia Day Honours "for service to sport as a Gold Medallist at the London 2012 Paralympic Games." In 2013 and 2014, she was awarded Wheelchair Sports WA Junior Sports Star of the Year.
