= Peter Williams (alpine skier) =

New Zealand Olympic para-alpine sit-skier

Personal information
- Nickname: Pete
- Born: 19 October 1983 (age 43) Auckland, New Zealand

Sport
- Country: New Zealand
- Sport: Para-alpine skiing
- Events: Super-G; Giant slalom; Slalom

Achievements and titles
- Paralympic finals: 19th (giant slalom, 2010); 22nd (slalom, 2010)
- Highest world ranking: 13th (slalom, 2008–09)

Peter Williams (born 19 October 1983) is a New Zealand Olympic para-alpine sit-skier from Auckland. He graduated from the Auckland University of Technology in 2005. Passing on the 2002 Winter Paralympics in order to pursue his education, he competed at the 2010 Winter Paralympics in the giant slalom, where he finished 19th, and the slalom where he finished 22nd.

== Personal ==
Williams has spina bifida, and, at birth, doctors predicted a short life expectancy of only three weeks for him. They told his mother not to bother to feed him, Williams remarked in a TVNZ interview. He has had over forty surgeries related to his spina bifida. Originally from the Auckland area, during the southern winter he lived in the ski resort town of Wānaka and in the northern ski season was based in Winter Park.

In 1992, he competed in the Kiwi Kids Triathlon, and was the first child with a disability to do so. He attended Auckland University of Technology where he earned a bachelor of communications in 2005 after majoring in television production. In 2010, he was a finalist for New Zealand snowsport emerging talent of the year.

== Skiing ==
Williams learned to ski as a standing skier, but changed to a sit-ski in 1996. He is a LW11-classified skier. He decided to forego competing in the 2002 Winter Paralympics in order to finish high school. At the 2008 Huntsman Cup, he finished second in the slalom event. He took up skiing again in order to prove to potential employers that his wheelchair was not an impediment for him to work at a high level. At the 2009 Cardrona Disabled National Championships, he finished second in the Super G with a time of 52.81 seconds, second in the giant slalom with a time of 48.45 seconds, and second in the slalom with a time of 54.28 seconds. He was beaten in every event by teammate Adam Hall.

At the 2009 NZ Winter Games Adaptive Giant slalom competition, competing in the giant slalom men's sitting event, he finished sixth. He finished fourth in the slalom. He was one of two New Zealanders to compete at the 2010 Winter Paralympics. The 2010 Paralympics were his first attendance.

Competing at the 2010 Winter Paralympics, he participated in two events: the slalom and the giant slalom. He finished twentieth in the men's sitting giant slalom. He completed his first run with a time of 1:34.16, leaving him in twenty-seventh place. Following a weather-delayed second run, he had a combined time of 3:11.86 for both runs. On the day of the giant slalom, he was on the hill for the competition by 6:30am and off the mountain at 5:00pm. He finished twenty-second in the slalom, with a combined run time of 2:05.55.

== Post skiing ==
Post the Paralympic Games, Williams' career has revolves around marketing and operations for a wide variety of mobility equipment companies. Williams serves on a number of boards.
