= Swimming at the 2018 Commonwealth Games – Women's 100 metre backstroke S9 =

Women's 100 metre backstroke S9 at the 2018 Commonwealth Games
- Venue: Gold Coast Aquatic Centre
- Dates: 6 April 2018
- Competitors: 7 from 5 nations
- Winning time: 1:08.77

Medalists
gold medal	Alice Tai	England
silver medal	Ellie Cole	Australia
bronze medal	Ashleigh McConnell	Australia

The Women's 100 metre backstroke S9 event at the 2018 Commonwealth Games was held on 6 April at the Gold Coast Aquatic Centre.

== Schedule ==
The schedule is as follows:

All times are Australian Eastern Standard Time (UTC+10)

Date	Time	Round
Friday 6 April 2018	7:11	Qualifying
Friday 6 April 2018	16:13	Final

== Results ==
=== Heats ===
Rank	Lane	Name	Nationality	Time	Notes
1	4	Alice Tai	England	1:09.63	Q
2	5	Ellie Cole	Australia	1:11.18	Q
3	6	Toni Shaw	Scotland	1:16.19	Q
4	7	Ashleigh McConnell	Australia	1:16.50	Q
5	2	Madeleine Scott	Australia	1:16.87	Q
6	3	Tupou Neiufi	New Zealand	1:18.08	Q
7	1	Kiran Tak	India	1:46.29	Q

=== Final ===
Rank	Lane	Name	Nationality	Time	Notes
1st place, gold medalist(s)	4	Alice Tai	England	1:08.77	
2nd place, silver medalist(s)	5	Ellie Cole	Australia	1:11.51	
3rd place, bronze medalist(s)	6	Ashleigh McConnell	Australia	1:15.93	
4	2	Madeleine Scott	Australia	1:16.12	
5	3	Toni Shaw	Scotland	1:16.79	
6	7	Tupou Neiufi	New Zealand	1:17.10	
7	1	Kiran Tak	India	1:47.95	
