= Swimming at the 2018 Commonwealth Games – Women's 200 metre individual medley SM10 =

Women's 200 metre individual medley SM10 at the 2018 Commonwealth Games
- Venue: Gold Coast Aquatic Centre
- Dates: 7 April 2018
- Competitors: 9 from 4 nations
- Winning time: 2:27.72

Medalists
gold medal	Sophie Pascoe	New Zealand
silver medal	Aurelie Rivard	Canada
bronze medal	Katherine Downie	Australia

The Women's 200 metre individual medley SM10 event at the 2018 Commonwealth Games was held on 7 April at the Gold Coast Aquatic Centre.

== Schedule ==
The schedule is as follows:

All times are Australian Eastern Standard Time (UTC+10)

Date	Time	Round
Saturday 7 April 2018	6:35	Heat 1
Saturday 7 April 2018	6:39	Heat 2
Saturday 7 April 2018	17:03	Final

== Results ==
=== Heat 1 ===
Rank	Lane	Name	Nationality	Time	Notes
1	4	Aurelie Rivard	Canada	2:32.90	Q
2	5	Paige Leonhardt	Australia	2:34.29	Q
3	3	Toni Shaw	Scotland	2:38.60	Q
4	6	Samantha Ryan	Canada	2:44.23	Q

=== Heat 2 ===
Rank	Lane	Name	Nationality	Time	Notes
1	4	Sophie Pascoe	New Zealand	2:27.26	Q
2	5	Katherine Downie	Australia	2:35.49	Q
3	3	Jasmine Greenwood	Australia	2:37.44	Q
4	6	Katarina Roxon	Canada	2:45.77	Q
5	2	Beth Johnston	Scotland	2:51.60	

=== Final ===
Rank	Lane	Name	Nationality	Time	Notes
1st place, gold medalist(s)	4	Sophie Pascoe	New Zealand	2:27.72	
2nd place, silver medalist(s)	5	Aurelie Rivard	Canada	2:31.79	
3rd place, bronze medalist(s)	6	Katherine Downie	Australia	2:31.81	
4	3	Paige Leonhardt	Australia	2:32.68	
5	2	Jasmine Greenwood	Australia	2:34.97	
6	7	Toni Shaw	Scotland	2:38.38	
7	1	Samantha Ryan	Canada	2:43.63	
8	8	Katarina Roxon	Canada	2:48.32	
