= Toni Shaw =

British Paralympic swimmer (born 2003)

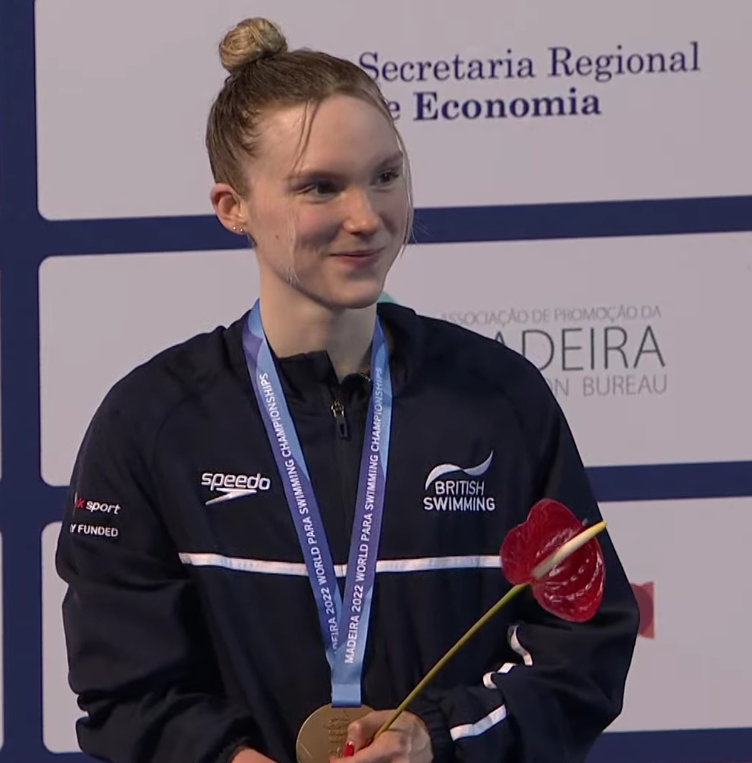
- Shaw at the 2022 World Para Swimming Championships

Personal information
- Full name: Toni Stephanie Shaw
- National team: Great Britain; Scotland
- Born: 5 August 2003 (age 23) Aberdeen, Scotland

Sport
- Sport: Swimming
- Strokes: backstroke, breaststroke, butterfly, freestyle
- Club: University of Stirling
Medal record
Women's paralympic swimming
Representing Great Britain
Summer Paralympics
Bronze medal – third place	2020 Tokyo	400 m freestyle S9
World Championships
Gold medal – first place	2019 London	4x100m medley 34pts
Gold medal – first place	2019 London	4x100m freestyle 34pts
Gold medal – first place	2022 Madeira	400 m freestyle S9
Silver medal – second place	2019 London	400 m freestyle S9
Silver medal – second place	2019 London	100 m butterfly S9
Bronze medal – third place	2019 London	100 m freestyle S9
Bronze medal – third place	2019 London	100 m medley
Bronze medal – third place	2022 Madeira	100 m butterfly S9
Bronze medal – third place	2023 Manchester	400 m freestyle S9
European Championships
Gold medal – first place	2018 Dublin	400 m freestyle S9
Gold medal – first place	2018 Dublin	4x100m medley 34pts
Silver medal – second place	2018 Dublin	200 m medley SM9
Silver medal – second place	2018 Dublin	100 m butterfly S9
Bronze medal – third place	2018 Dublin	100 m backstroke S9
Representing Scotland
Commonwealth Games
Bronze medal – third place	2022 Birmingham	100 m freestyle S9

Toni Stephanie Shaw (born 5 August 2003) is a British Paralympic swimmer. In 2019 she set the world record time for the S9 200m butterfly, and was also part of the team that set a new world record for the 4 × 100 m medley relay. At the 2020 Summer Paralympics, she won a bronze medal in the women's 400 metre freestyle S9 event and later went on to win gold at the 2022 World Para Swimming Championships, becoming the World Champion. She is a three-time World Champion and two-time European Champion.

== Personal life and career ==
Shaw's right arm never fully formed and she was born without her right hand. From 2019 Shaw started using a carbon fibre prosthetic for her arm that with the use of different attachments enabled her to undertake upper-body exercises such as press-ups and weight training that benefit swimmers but had previously not been possible for her.

Shaw was born on 5 August 2003 and took swimming lessons from the age of eight. At the age of 14, she held 14 Scottish national swimming records in the S9 and S10 classifications and was selected to compete for Team Scotland at the 2018 Commonwealth Games where she finished 5th in both the Women's S9 100m Backstroke and Women's 100-metre freestyle S9; 6th in the Women's 200-metre individual medley SM10, and seventh in the Women's 100-metre breaststroke SB9.

She set a new world record time of 2.30.46 in the S9 200m butterfly at the Para-swimming World Series in Berlin in 2019 at the age of 15, and won six medals at the 2019 World Para Swimming Championships, including gold medals in the 4 × 100 m medley relay and the 4 × 100 m freestyle relay. The 4 × 100 m medley relay team, comprising Alice Tai, Brock Whiston, Shaw and Stephanie Millward beat the second-placed United States team by 22 seconds and set a new world record of 4.36.31.

Shaw was coached by the Aberdeen University performance swimming coach Gregor McMillan and trained at Aberdeen Sports Village Aquatics Centre. She was one of ten nominees for BBC Young Sports Personality of the Year in 2019. Shaw currently Swims for University of Stirling while doing an undergraduate degree in Business.

In June 2022, Shaw won Bronze in the Women's 100m Butterfly S9 at the 2022 World Para Swimming Championships in Funchal, Madeira, qualifying first her heat for the final. She also came 5th in the SM9 200m Individual Medley. On 16 June, Shaw won gold in the women's 400 metre freestyle S9, and became the World Champion.

On the first day of swimming competition at the 2022 Commonwealth Games, held in Birmingham, England Shaw won bronze in the S9 100m Freestyle at the 2022 Commonwealth Games in a time of 1:03.75, finishing one one-hundredth of a second behind Australia's Emily Beecroft.

== Record in major competitions ==
2018 Commonwealth Games

- 5th – Women's S9 100m Backstroke
- 5th – Women's 100-metre freestyle S9
- 6th – Women's 200-metre individual medley SM10
- 7th – Women's 100-metre breaststroke SB9

2018 World Para Swimming European Championships

- 1st –Women's 400 metres freestyle
- 1st – Women's 4 x 100 metres medley relay
- 2nd – Women's 200 metres individual medley
- 2nd – Women's 100 metres butterfly
- 3rd – Women's 100 metres backstroke

2019 World Para Swimming Championships

- 5th – Women's S9 50m Freestyle
- 3rd – Women's S9 100m Freestyle
- 2nd – Women's S9 400m Freestyle
- 2nd – Women's S9 100m Butterfly
- 3rd – Women's S9 200m Individual Medley
- 1st – Women's 34pt 4 × 100 m Medley Relay
- 1st – Women's 34pt 4 × 100 m Freestyle Relay

2022 World Para Swimming Championships

- 4th – Women's S9 100m Freestyle
- 4th – Women's S9 200m Individual Medley
- 3rd – Women's S9 100m Butterfly
- 1st – Women's S9 400m Freestyle

2022 Commonwealth Games

- 3rd-Women's S9 100m Freestyle
