= Mark Edwards (skier) =

New Zealand para-alpine skier

Personal information
- Nationality: New Zealand
Medal record
Men's para alpine skiing
Representing New Zealand
Paralympic Games
Bronze medal – third place	1984 Innsbruck	Downhill LW3

Mark Edwards is a Paralympic medalist from New Zealand who competed in alpine skiing. He competed in the 1984 Winter Paralympics where he won a bronze medal in downhill.
