= Christopher Orr (skier) =

New Zealand para-alpine skier

Personal information
- Nationality: New Zealand
Medal record
Men's para alpine skiing
Representing New Zealand
Paralympic Games
Silver medal – second place	1984 Innsbruck	Downhill

Christopher Orr is a Paralympic medalist from New Zealand who competed in alpine skiing. He competed in the 1984 Winter Paralympics where he won a silver medal in downhill.
