= Ashleigh McConnell =

Australian Paralympic swimmer

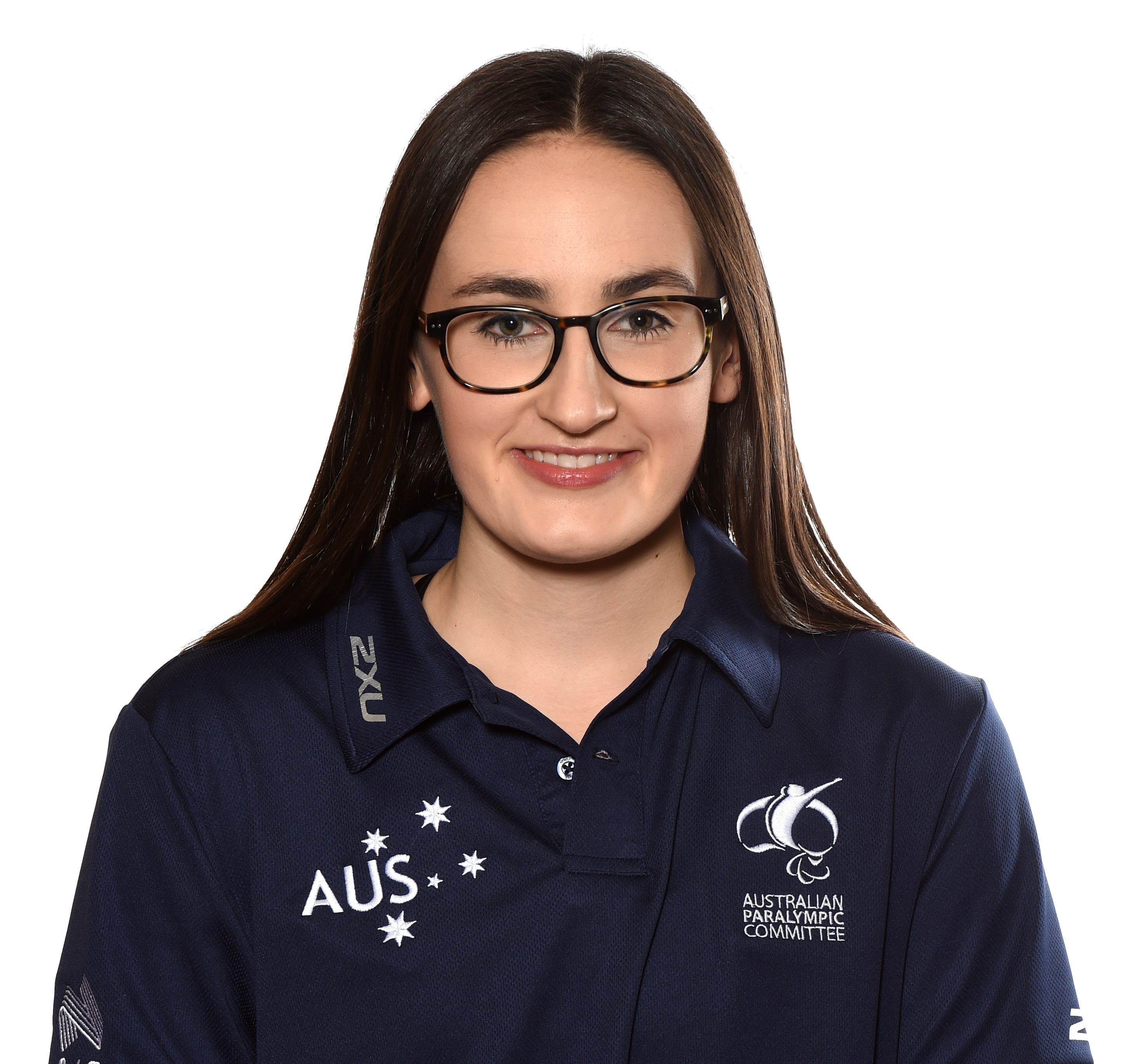

Personal information
- Full name: Ashleigh McConnell
- Nationality: Australian
- Born: 26 March 1996 (age 30) Melbourne, Victoria

Sport
- Sport: Swimming
- Classifications: S9, SB8, SM9
- Club: Melbourne Vicentre
- Coach: Kenrick Monk
Medal record
Women's paralympic swimming
Representing Australia
Paralympics
Gold medal – first place	2016 Rio de Janeiro	4x100 m freestyle 34 pts
Silver medal – second place	2020 Tokyo	4×100 m freestyle 34 pts
IPC Swimming World Championships
Gold medal – first place	2015 Glasgow	4x100 m freestyle
Commonwealth Games
Bronze medal – third place	2018 Gold Coast	100m backstroke S9

Ashleigh Kate McConnell, OAM (born 26 March 1996) is a limb deficient Paralympic swimmer of Australia. She represented Australia at the 2016 Rio Paralympics and the 2020 Tokyo Paralympics, where she won gold medals in freestyle relay events.

== Personal ==
McConnell was born on 26 March 1996 in Melbourne, Victoria. She was born without her left forearm and left hand. She attended Sunbury College. In 2015, she was studying business at Royal Melbourne Institute of Technology.

== Career ==
McConnell started swimming at the age of four. She is classified as a S9 swimmer. She narrowly missed out on making the 2014 Commonwealth Games and 2014 Pan Pacific Swimming Championships. At the 2015 IPC Swimming World Championships in Glasgow, Scotland, she won a gold medal in the Women's 4 × 100 m Freestyle Relay 34 points.

At the 2016 Summer Paralympics, McConnell won the gold medal in the Women's 4 × 100 m Freestyle Relay 34 points and competed in three additional freestyle events.

At the 2018 Commonwealth Games on the Gold Coast, McConnell won the bronze medal in the Women's 100m Backstroke S9.

At the 2020 Tokyo Paralympics, McConnell, together with her team of Emily Beecroft, Ellie Cole, and Isabella Vincent won a silver medal in the Women's 4x100m Freestyle 34 pts with a time of 4:26.82, two seconds behind the winners, Italy. She also qualified for the final of the Women's 100 m freestyle S9 where she finished sixth.

At the 2022 Commonwealth Games, Birmingham, England, she finished 4th in the Women's 100 m freestyle S9.

McConnell's motto is "You can't put a limit on anything. The more you dream, the further you get".

== Recognition ==
In 2016, with Para swimmer Monique Murphy, McConnell was named RMIT's Female Athlete of the Year.

McConnell was awarded the Medal of the Order of Australia in 2017.
