= Adam Hall (alpine skier) =

New Zealand Para alpine skier (born 1987)

Adam Hall MNZM
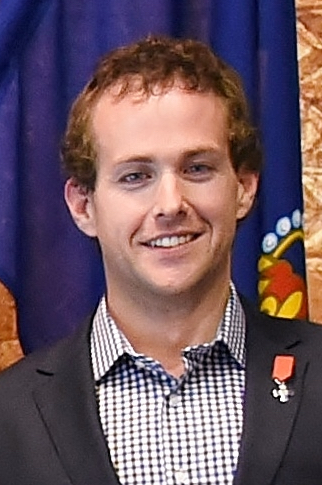
- Hall in 2017

Personal information
- Full name: Adam James Hall
- Born: 9 October 1987 (age 38) Dunedin, New Zealand

Sport
- Country: New Zealand
- Sport: Para alpine skiing
- Events: Downhill slalom Giant slalom Super combined Super-G
Medal record
Men's Para alpine skiing
Representing New Zealand
Paralympic Games
Gold medal – first place	2010 Vancouver	Slalom standing
Gold medal – first place	2018 PyeongChang	Slalom standing
Silver medal – second place	2026 Milano Cortina	Slalom standing
Bronze medal – third place	2018 PyeongChang	Super combined standing
Bronze medal – third place	2022 Beijing	Super combined standing
Bronze medal – third place	2022 Beijing	Slalom standing
World Championships
Silver medal – second place	2021 Lillehammer	Slalom standing
Bronze medal – third place	2013 La Molina	Slalom standing
Bronze medal – third place	2017 Tarvisio	Slalom standing
New Zealand Winter Games
Gold medal – first place	2011 Queenstown	Slalom standing

Adam James Hall MNZM (born 9 October 1987) is a New Zealand Para alpine skier and two-time Paralympic gold medalist.

== Life ==
Hall was born in Dunedin on 9 October 1987 to Lindsay Hall, a dairy farmer, and Gayle Hall, née Paterson, an obstetric nurse. He was diagnosed with spina bifida.

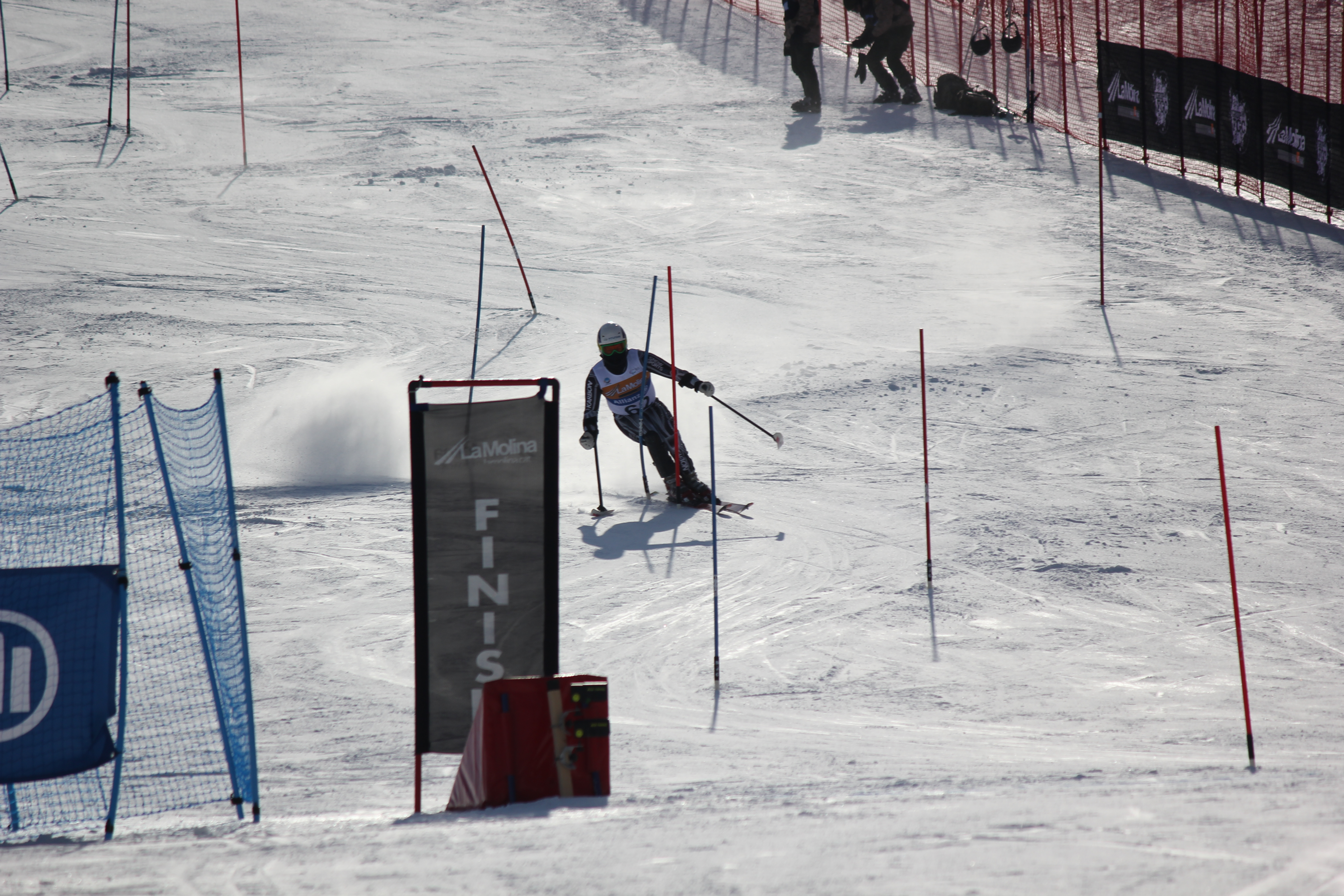
Hall in the slalom event at the 2013 IPC World Championships

Hall competed for New Zealand at the 2006 Winter Paralympics, where he placed 41st in the men's downhill event, 43rd in the men's giant slalom and 50th in the men's super-G, standing

At the 2010 Winter Paralympics, Hall won a gold medal in the men's slalom event, standing. He placed 8th in the men's super combined and 7th in the men's super-G, standing.

At the 2018 Winter Paralympics, Hall again won a gold medal in the men's slalom event, standing, and also won a bronze medal in the super combined standing. He was also named as a co-recipient of the 2018 Whang Youn Dai Achievement Award.

In 2022, he won the silver medal in the men's standing slalom event at the 2021 World Para Snow Sports Championships held in Lillehammer, Norway.

Hall was appointed a Member of the New Zealand Order of Merit in the 2011 Queen's Birthday Honours, for services to sport.

At the 2026 Winter Paralympics, Hall won a silver medal in the men's slalom (standing) event. As a result, he tied the record for most Winter Paralympic medals, alongside Patrick Cooper to become the most decorated New Zealand Winter Paralympian.

Awards
Preceded by Sophie Pascoe	Halberg Awards – Para Athlete of the Year; 2018	Succeeded by Sophie Pascoe
