= Corey Peters (alpine skier) =

New Zealand alpine skier and Paralympic medallist

Corey Peters MNZM
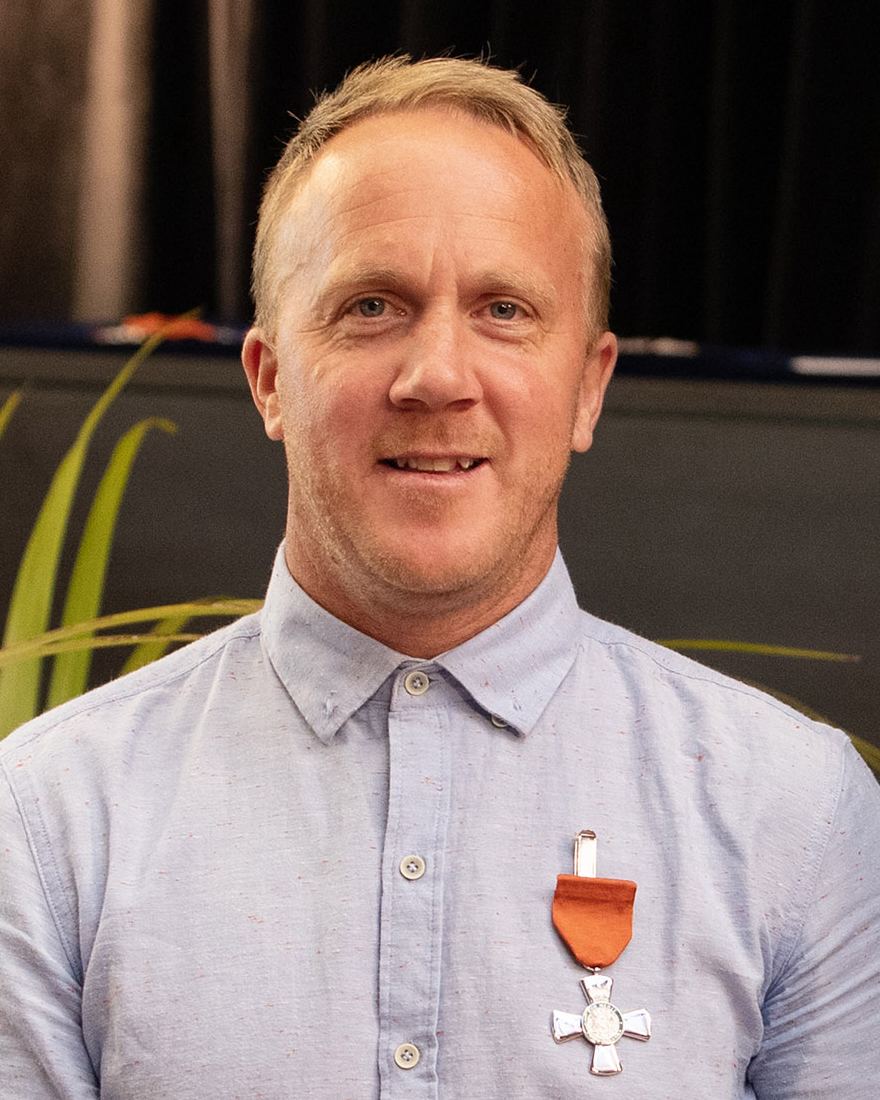
- Peters in 2024

Personal information
- Born: Corey Nathan Peters; 12 July 1983 (age 43)

Sport
- Country: New Zealand
- Sport: Alpine skiing
- Disability class: LW12.1
- Events: Downhill; Slalom; Giant slalom Super combined Super-G
Medal record
Men's para alpine skiing
Representing New Zealand
Paralympic Games
Gold medal – first place	2022 Beijing	Downhill sitting
Silver medal – second place	2022 Beijing	Super-G sitting
Silver medal – second place	2014 Sochi	Giant slalom sitting
Bronze medal – third place	2018 PyeongChang	Downhill sitting

Corey Nathan Peters MNZM (born 12 July 1983) is a New Zealand alpine skier and Paralympic medallist. In September 2009 when he was aged 26 he sustained a crushed spinal cord at a motocross event, leaving him paralysed. Corey spent four months in the Spinal Unit learning the basics of how to live life in a wheelchair taking up sit-skiing in 2011. He has represented New Zealand at four Paralympics.

== Career ==
Peters won a silver medal at the 2014 Winter Paralympic Games, and a bronze medal at the 2018 Winter Paralympic Games.

He won a gold medal at the 2022 Winter Paralympic Games in the sitting downhill event. Peters described his gold medal-winning run as "probably the run of my life." Less than 24 hours later Peters won a silver medal in the super G sitting event. Peters said that picking up the two medals was more than he expected. "Definitely, I think I have exceeded my own expectations," he said.

At the 2026 Winter Paralympics, Peters competed in Men's downhill sitting, Men's super-G sitting, and Men's giant slalom sitting.

In October 2026, Peters announced his retirement from competitive snow sports.

== Awards ==
Peters was named Sportsperson of the Year at the Taranaki Sports Awards in 2015. He was also named Snow Sports NZ Overall Athlete of the Year and Adaptive Snow Sports Athlete of the Year in 2015 and 2014. Peters also won the overall Sportsperson award at the Taranaki Sports Awards in 2022.

Corey was named Para Athlete of the Year at the 60th ISPS Handa Halberg Awards for his Beijing 2022 performances.

In the 2023 New Year Honours, Peters was appointed a Member of the New Zealand Order of Merit, for services to sit-skiing.

Awards
Preceded by Sophie Pascoe	Halberg Awards; Para Athlete or Para Team of the Year; 2022	Succeeded by Cameron Leslie
