= Tupou Neiufi =

New Zealand para-swimmer (born 2001)

Personal information
- Born: 15 June 2001 (age 25) Māngere East, Auckland, New Zealand

Sport
- Sport: Swimming
- Classifications: S8, SB8, SM8
- Coach: Sheldon Kemp
Medal record
Women's para swimming
Representing New Zealand
Summer Paralympic Games
Gold medal – first place	2020 Tokyo	100 m backstroke S8
World Championships
Silver medal – second place	2019 London	100 m backstroke S8
Bronze medal – third place	2023 Manchester	100 m backstroke S8
Commonwealth Games
Silver medal – second place	2022 Birmingham	100 m backstroke S8

Tupou Neiufi (born 15 June 2001) is a New Zealand para-swimmer who represented her country at the 2016 Summer Paralympics and the 2018 Commonwealth Games. She won a silver medal at the 2019 World Para Swimming Championships and gold at the 2020 Summer Paralympics in Tokyo.

== Early life ==
Born in the Auckland suburb of Māngere East in 2001, Neiufi is the eldest child of Tongan New Zealanders Lose and Fineasi Neiufi. She has six younger siblings. At age two, Neiufi was run over in a hit-and-run accident and suffered damage to the right side of her head. She suffered bruising on the brain, hypertonia and has a left-sided hemiplegia and as a result the left side of her brain is smaller than the right, causing slower processing at times. The left side of her body is also smaller and weaker than the right. After the accident, Neiufi had to be taught how to sit, walk and use her arms again.

As a child, she wanted to play netball but had difficulty keeping up with the other players. Her physiotherapist suggested she try swimming, and she started swimming at about nine years of age and competing the following year.

Neiufi was educated at Sutton Park Primary School and later Otahuhu College.

== Swimming career ==
In 2011, Paralympics New Zealand selected Neiufi for coaching and High Performance Sport New Zealand selected her for their sport services and support programme. In 2016, she was named a reserve for the 2016 Summer Paralympics in Rio de Janeiro, and was selected in August after fellow swimmer Bryall McPherson had to withdraw through injury. Neiufi competed in the women's 100 m backstroke S9, placing seventh.

Neiufi represented New Zealand at the 2018 Commonwealth Games on the Gold Coast, competing in the 100 m backstroke S9, and finished in sixth place in the final.

Neiufi was a silver medallist in the 100 m backstroke S8 at the 2019 World Para Swimming Championships in London. She won New Zealand's first gold at the 2020 Summer Paralympics in the 100m backstroke S8 in Tokyo.

== Awards and recognition ==
In 2017 Neiufi won the Pacific Health and Wellbeing Award at the SunPix Pacific Peoples Awards in Auckland, New Zealand. She also received the 2017 Tongan Youth Excellence Award in the Senior Athlete category from the To’utupu Tonga Youth Trust.
