= Sophie Pascoe =

New Zealand Paralympic swimmer

Dame Sophie Pascoe DNZM
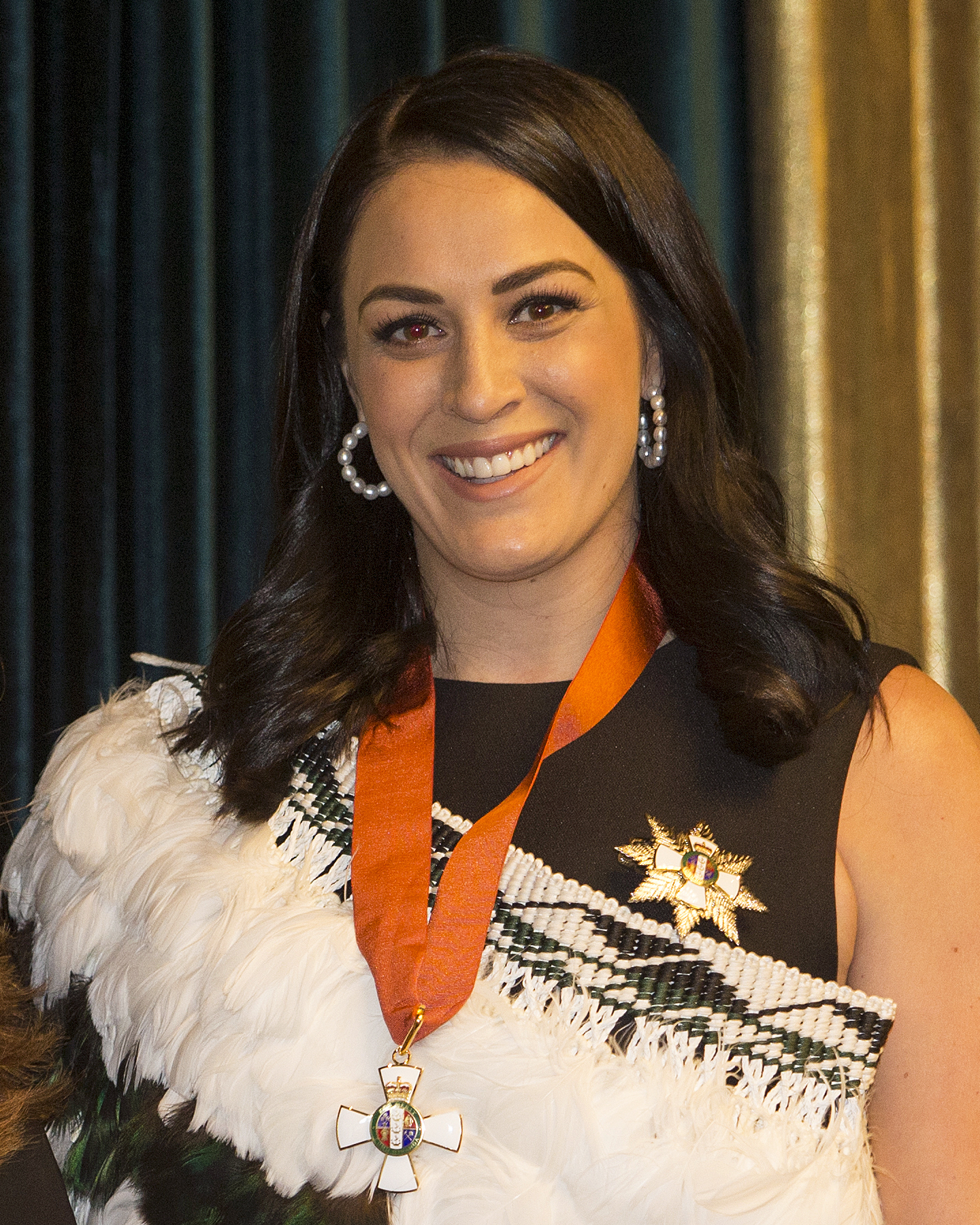
- Pascoe in 2022

Personal information
- Full name: Sophie Frances Pascoe
- Born: 8 January 1993 (age 33) Christchurch, New Zealand

Sport
- Country: New Zealand
- Sport: Swimming
- Classifications: S10, SB9, SM10
- Club: QEII Swim Club
- Coach: Roly Crichton (2001–2022)
Medal record
Women's para swimming
Representing New Zealand
Event	1st	2nd	3rd
Paralympic Games	11	7	1
World Championships (LC)	12	4	4
World Championships (SC)	4	0	3
Commonwealth Games	5	0	0
Total	32	11	8
Paralympic Games
Gold medal – first place	2008 Beijing	100 m backstroke S10
Gold medal – first place	2008 Beijing	100 m breaststroke SB9
Gold medal – first place	2008 Beijing	200 m individual medley SM10
Gold medal – first place	2012 London	100 m freestyle S10
Gold medal – first place	2012 London	100 m butterfly S10
Gold medal – first place	2012 London	200 m individual medley SM10
Gold medal – first place	2016 Rio de Janeiro	100 m backstroke S10
Gold medal – first place	2016 Rio de Janeiro	100 m butterfly S10
Gold medal – first place	2016 Rio de Janeiro	200 m individual medley SM10
Gold medal – first place	2020 Tokyo	100 m freestyle S9
Gold medal – first place	2020 Tokyo	200 m individual medley SM9
Silver medal – second place	2008 Beijing	100 m butterfly S10
Silver medal – second place	2012 London	50 m freestyle S10
Silver medal – second place	2012 London	100 m backstroke S10
Silver medal – second place	2012 London	100 m breaststroke SB9
Silver medal – second place	2016 Rio de Janeiro	50 m freestyle S10
Silver medal – second place	2016 Rio de Janeiro	100 m freestyle S10
Silver medal – second place	2020 Tokyo	100 m breaststroke SB8
Bronze medal – third place	2020 Tokyo	100 m backstroke S9
World Championships (LC)
Gold medal – first place	2010 Eindhoven	100 m butterfly S10
Gold medal – first place	2013 Montreal	100 m backstroke S10
Gold medal – first place	2013 Montreal	100 m breaststroke SB9
Gold medal – first place	2013 Montreal	100 m butterfly S10
Gold medal – first place	2013 Montreal	100 m freestyle S10
Gold medal – first place	2013 Montreal	50 m freestyle S10
Gold medal – first place	2015 Glasgow	200 m medley SM10
Gold medal – first place	2015 Glasgow	100 m freestyle S10
Gold medal – first place	2015 Glasgow	100 m butterfly S10
Gold medal – first place	2019 London	100 m backstroke S9
Gold medal – first place	2019 London	100 m freestyle S9
Gold medal – first place	2019 London	100 m butterfly S9
Gold medal – first place	2019 London	50 m freestyle S9
Silver medal – second place	2010 Eindhoven	50 m freestyle S10
Silver medal – second place	2010 Eindhoven	100 m backstroke S10
Silver medal – second place	2010 Eindhoven	200 m individual medley SM10
Silver medal – second place	2015 Glasgow	100 m backstroke S10
Bronze medal – third place	2006 Durban	200 m individual medley SM10
Bronze medal – third place	2010 Eindhoven	100 m breaststroke SB9
Bronze medal – third place	2015 Glasgow	50 m breaststroke S10
Bronze medal – third place	2015 Glasgow	100 m breaststroke S10
World Championships (SC)
Gold medal – first place	2009 Rio de Janeiro	100 m backstroke S10
Gold medal – first place	2009 Rio de Janeiro	100 m butterfly S10
Gold medal – first place	2009 Rio de Janeiro	100 m individual medley SM10
Gold medal – first place	2009 Rio de Janeiro	200 m individual medley SM10
Bronze medal – third place	2009 Rio de Janeiro	100 m freestyle S10
Bronze medal – third place	2009 Rio de Janeiro	400 m freestyle S10
Bronze medal – third place	2009 Rio de Janeiro	100 m breaststroke SB9
Commonwealth Games
Gold medal – first place	2014 Glasgow	100 m breaststroke SB9
Gold medal – first place	2014 Glasgow	200 m individual medley SM10
Gold medal – first place	2018 Gold Coast	200 m individual medley SM10
Gold medal – first place	2018 Gold Coast	100 m breaststroke SB9
Gold medal – first place	2022 Birmingham	100 m freestyle S9

Dame Sophie Frances Pascoe DNZM (born 8 January 1993) is a retired New Zealand para-swimmer. She represented New Zealand at four Summer Paralympic Games from 2008, winning a total of eleven gold medals, seven silver medals and one bronze medal, making her New Zealand's most successful Paralympian. She also represented New Zealand at the Commonwealth Games.

== Early life ==
Born in Christchurch on 8 January 1993 to Garry and Jo Pascoe, Pascoe grew up on a lifestyle block near Halswell on the south-western outskirts of the city. She has one older sister, Rebecca. On 23 September 1995, Pascoe was accidentally run over by her father on the family ride-on lawnmower. As a result of the accident, her left leg was amputated below the knee, while the rear of her right leg was left with severe scarring. She attended Halswell Primary School, and Lincoln High School in the nearby Christchurch satellite town of Lincoln.

Pascoe began swimming at the age of 7, and from the age of 8 up until 2022, was coached by Roly Crichton. She trains at the QEII swim club, which has been based at Jellie Park in Burnside since the facilities at Queen Elizabeth II Park were damaged in the 2011 Christchurch earthquake.

== Swimming career ==
Pascoe is classified S10 for freestyle, backstroke and butterfly, SB9 for breaststroke, and SM10 for individual medley.

At the 2008 Summer Paralympics, Pascoe won a gold and a silver medal for the 100 m breaststroke and 100 m butterfly respectively and later a gold for the women's 200 m individual medley. Pascoe then shared a gold medal for the 100 m backstroke when she drew with South African Shireen Sapiro. At 15 years of age, Pascoe was New Zealand's youngest athlete at the Paralympics, and the youngest ever New Zealander to win a medal.

Following the 2008 Paralympics, Pascoe was voted New Zealand's favourite Paralympian in a nationwide voting competition run by Mitsubishi Motors. For this she won a Mitsubishi VRX Outlander. Pascoe was appointed a Member of the New Zealand Order of Merit in the 2009 New Year's Honours, for services to swimming. In February 2012, Pascoe became the inaugural winner of the Disabled Sportsperson of the Year award at the 2011 Halberg Awards.

At the 2012 Summer Paralympics, Pascoe competed in six events – the four in which she won medals at the 2008 Paralympics, plus the 50m freestyle (S10) and 100m freestyle (SM10) events. She successfully defended her 200 m individual medley (SM10) gold medal, breaking her own world record by four seconds with a time of 2:25.65. She also won gold medals in the 100 m butterfly (S10), where she bettered her silver at Beijing and in the process setting a new world record with a time of 1:04.43, and in the 100 m freestyle (S10), setting a new Paralympic record with a time of 1:00.89. Pascoe won silver medals in the 50 m freestyle (S10), 100 m backstroke (S10), and 100 m breaststroke (SB9).

In March 2013, Pascoe broke her own world record for the 50m butterfly at the New Zealand Swimming Championships in Auckland, setting a time of 29.21 seconds.

At the 2016 Summer Paralympics in Rio de Janeiro, Pascoe competed in five events, dropping the 100 m breaststroke SB9. She won gold medals in the 100 m backstroke, 100 m butterfly and 200 m individual medley, the latter in world record time. She also won silver medals in the 50 m freestyle and 100 m freestyle, both behind Canada's Aurélie Rivard. Her 50 m freestyle medal holds the distinction as the 200th medal won by New Zealand at the Paralympic Games (both summer and winter editions). Her success took her gold medal count to nine and her total medal count to 15, overtaking Eve Rimmer's eight gold medals and 14 total medals to become New Zealand's most successful Paralympian.

At the 2020 Summer Paralympics, she competed in the Women's 100 metre breaststroke SB8, winning the silver medal, and Women's 100 metre backstroke S9, winning the bronze medal.

In the 2022 New Year Honours, Pascoe was promoted to Dame Companion of the New Zealand Order of Merit, for services to swimming.

Pascoe announced her retirement on 30 January 2025.

== Personal bests ==
Event	Time	Date	Location	Notes
50 m freestyle (S10)	27.78	18 August 2013	Montreal, Canada	AR
200 m freestyle (S10)	2:12.35	19 December 2015	Auckland, New Zealand	AR
50 m backstroke (S10)	31.62	10 August 2014	Auckland, New Zealand	AR
100 m backstroke (S10)	1:05.95	17 August 2013	Montreal, Canada	AR
100 m breaststroke (SB9)	1:17.53	14 August 2013	Montreal, Canada	AR
100 m freestyle (S10)	59.50	30 September 2013	Wellington, New Zealand	WR
50 m butterfly (S10)	28.38	19 March 2013	Auckland, New Zealand	WR
100 m butterfly (S10)	1:02.60	31 March 2016	Auckland, New Zealand	WR
200 m individual medley (SM10)	2:24.90	11 September 2016	Rio de Janeiro, Brazil	WR
400 m individual medley (SM10)	5:23.67	19 December 2015	Auckland, New Zealand	WR

== Major achievements ==
- 2022: One gold medal at the 2022 Commonwealth Games (100 m freestyle)
- 2019: Four gold medals at the World Para Swimming Championships in London.
- 2018: Two gold medals at the 2018 Commonwealth Games (4x50m individual medley, 100m Breaststroke)
- 2017: Winner of the Halberg Award for Disabled Sportsperson of the Year
- 2016: Five medals at the 2016 Paralympics, three gold and two silver.
- 2015: Winner of the Halberg Award for Disabled Sportsperson of the Year
- 2014: Two gold medals at the 2014 Commonwealth Games (4x50m individual medley, 100m Breaststroke)
- 2013: Winner of the Halberg Award for Disabled Sportsperson of the Year
- 2012: Three gold medals (100 m freestyle-S10, 100 m butterfly-S10, 200 m individual medley-SM10); three silver medals (50 m freestyle-S10, 100 m backstroke-S10, 100 m breaststroke-SB9) – International Paralympic Committee (IPC) – Paralympic Games, London, United Kingdom; Winner of the Halberg Award for Disabled Sportsperson of the Year. Named as an ambassador for Beef and Lamb New Zealand.
- 2011: Winner of the Halberg Award for Disabled Sportsperson of the Year
- 2010: Gold medal (100 m butterfly-S10); three silver medals (50 m freestyle-S10, 100 m backstroke-S10, 200 m individual medley-SM10); bronze medal (100 m breaststroke-SB9) – IPC World Championships, Eindhoven, Netherlands
- 2009: Four gold medals (100 m backstroke-S10, 100 m butterfly-S10, 100 m individual medley-SM10, 200 m individual medley-SM10); three bronze medals (100 m freestyle-S10, 400 m freestyle-S10, 100 m breaststroke-SB9) – IPC World Championships – 25 m, Rio de Janeiro, Brazil
- 2008: Three gold medals (100 m backstroke-S10, 100 m breaststroke-SB9, 200 m individual medley-SM10); Silver (100 m butterfly-S10) – International Paralympic Committee (IPC) – Paralympic Games, Beijing, China
- 2006: Bronze (200 m individual medley-SM10) – IPC World Championships, Durban, South Africa

Awards
New award	Halberg Awards – Disabled Sportsperson of the Year; 2011, 2012, 2013; 2015; 2017; 2019, 2021	Succeeded by Mary Fisher
Preceded by Mary Fisher	Halberg Awards – Disabled Sportsperson of the Year; 2011, 2012, 2013; 2015; 2017; 2019, 2021	Succeeded by Liam Malone
Preceded by Liam Malone	Halberg Awards – Disabled Sportsperson of the Year; 2011, 2012, 2013; 2015; 2017; 2019, 2021	Succeeded by Adam Hall
Preceded by Adam Hall	Halberg Awards – Disabled Sportsperson of the Year; 2011, 2012, 2013; 2015; 2017; 2019, 2021	Succeeded by Corey Peters
Preceded by Brendon McCullum	Halberg Awards – Leadership Award; 2016	Succeeded by Steve Hansen
