= Emily Beecroft =

Australian Paralympic swimmer (born 1999)

Emily Beecroft OAM
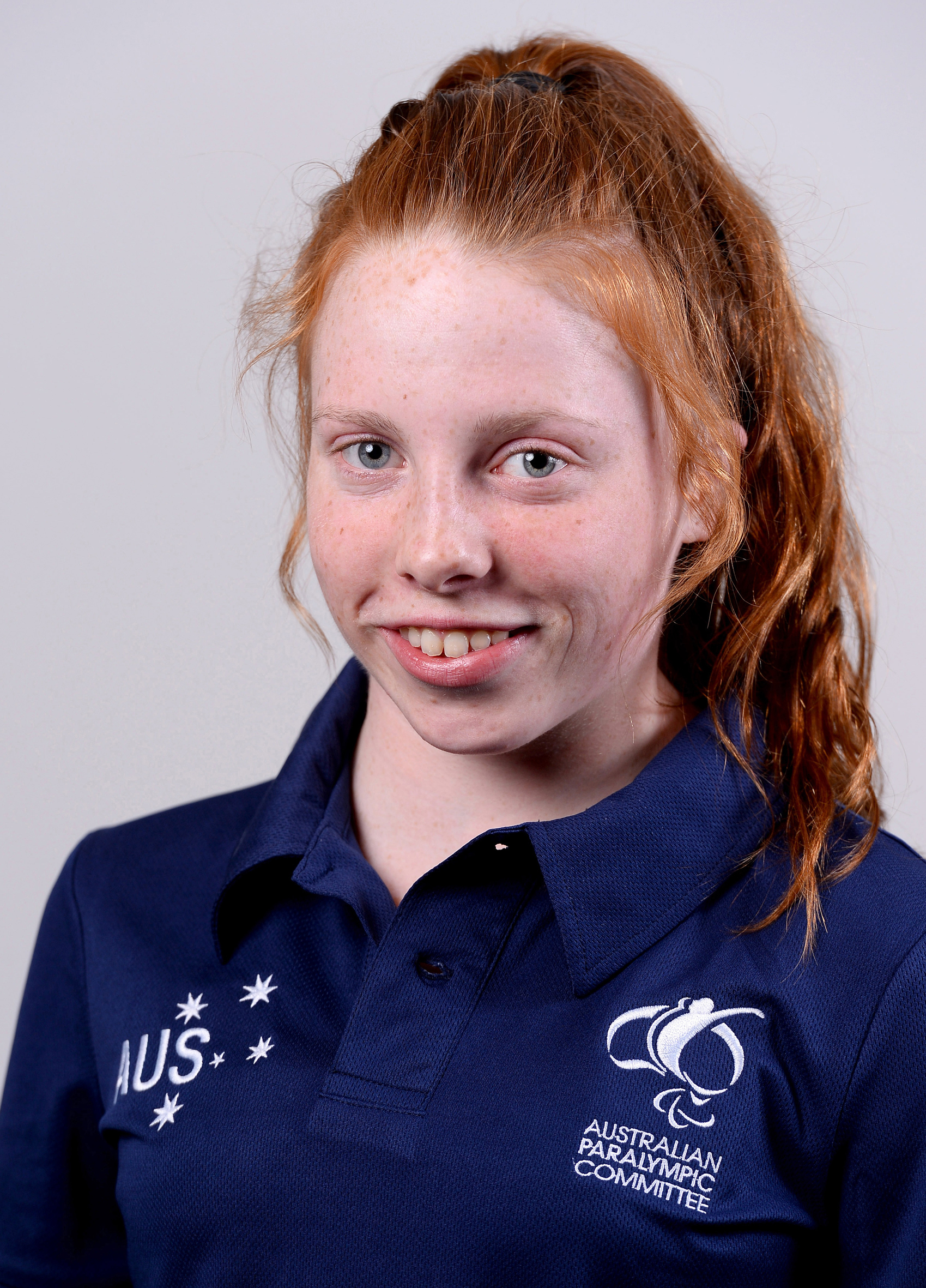
- 2016 Australian Paralympic team portrait

Personal information
- Full name: Emily Beecroft
- Nationality: Australian
- Born: 19 November 1999 (age 26) Clayton, Queensland

Sport
- Sport: Swimming
- Strokes: Butterfly, freestyle
- Classifications: S9
- Club: University of Sunshine Coast (USC) Spartans
- Coach: Harley Connolly,
Medal record
Women's Paralympic swimming
Representing Australia
Paralympic Games
Gold medal – first place	2024 Paris	Mixed 4×100 m medley relay 34pts
Silver medal – second place	2020 Tokyo	4×100 m freestyle relay 34 pts
Bronze medal – third place	2020 Tokyo	4×100 m medley relay 34pts
Bronze medal – third place	2024 Paris	100 m butterfly S9
World Championships
Gold medal – first place	2022 Madeira	Mixed 4 × 100 m medley relay 34 pts
Silver medal – second place	2022 Madeira	100 m butterfly S9
Silver medal – second place	2022 Madeira	100 m freestyle S9
Bronze medal – third place	2023 Manchester	100 m butterfly S9
Bronze medal – third place	2025 Singapore	100 m butterfly S9
Bronze medal – third place	2025 Singapore	Mixed 4×100 m medley relay 34pts
Commonwealth Games
Silver medal – second place	2022 Birmingham	100 m freestyle S9
Silver medal – second place	2026 Glasgow	100 m freestyle S9

Emily Jane Beecroft OAM (born 19 November 1999) is an Australian Paralympic swimmer. She represented Australia at the 2016 Rio Paralympics, 2020 Tokyo Paralympics and 2024 Paris Paralympics.

She won a silver and bronze medal at the 2020 Tokyo Paralympics, and a gold and bronze medals at the 2024 Paris Paralympics.

== Personal life ==
Beecroft was born on 19 November 1999, a triplet with two sisters. She lived in Traralgon, Victoria. She was born deaf in her left ear and with a right arm limb deficiency. In 2020, she studied part-time media and communications at La Trobe University. She moved to the Queensland Sunshine Coast and in 2022 was studying a Bachelor of Communications at the University of the Sunshine Coast.

== Swimming career ==
Beecroft played netball and participated in athletics, but eventually decided to concentrate on swimming. In 2010, she competed won ten medals at the School Sports Championships, and was awarded the Sportsmanship Award in 2012. Competing for the Traralgon Swimming Club, she swam a personal best time to take the bronze medal in the 50 metre breaststroke multi-class event at the National Open Championships in May 2013.

By March 2015, Beecroft was ranked in the top five in the world in the 50 metre butterfly, 50 metre and 100 metre freestyle and in the top 15 in all her other events. She made her international debut at the US Para Championships in Bismarck, North Dakota, in December 2015, where she was officially classified S9, and swam second in the 50 metre butterfly, and 50 metre and 100 metre freestyle events. She won gold in the 50 metre freestyle and 100 metre butterfly events at the 2015 Australian Open Championships, and the 2016 Australian Age Championships.

At the 2016 Australian Swimming Championships in Adelaide, coached by Dean Gooch, Beecroft won gold in the 50 metre and 100 metre freestyle and 50 metre butterfly events. All three swims were personal bests, but the 31.93 second 50-metre butterfly swim also broke the national record set by Madeleine Scott back in 2009. On 14 April 2016, she was named part of the Australian swim team for the 2016 Summer Paralympics in Rio.

In September 2016, she represented Australia at the Rio Paralympics in four different S9 classification events. Beecroft qualified for three finals from her four events, however was unsuccessful in having any podium finishes. She finished fourth in 50m Freestyle S9, sixth in 100m Freestyle S9 and 6th in 100m Butterfly S9. Beecroft also competed in 200m Individual Medley SM9 but did not advance to the finals. In response to being asked 'What's the purpose of going to Rio?' Beecroft replied saying "I'm going there to race and win!"

At the 2018 Commonwealth Games, Gold Coast, Beecroft finished fourth in the Women's 100m Freestyle S9.

At the 2020 Tokyo Paralympics, Beecroft, together with her team of Ellie Cole, Isabella Vincent, and Ashleigh McConnell won a silver medal in the Women's 4x100m Freestyle 34 pts with a time of 4:26.82, two seconds behind the winners, Italy. She also won a bronze medal in the 34pts Women's 4x100m Medley 34 pts. Her team of Ellie Cole, Keira Stephens and Isabella Vincent clocked 4:55.70. In the Women's 100 m freestyle S9 Beecroft qualified for the final but finished eighth and did not win a medal

At the 2022 World Para Swimming Championships, Madeira Beecroft won three medals - gold in the Mixed 4 × 100 m medley relay 34 pts and silver in Women's 100 m Freestyle S9 and Women's 100 m Butterfly S9.

At the 2022 Commonwealth Games, Birmingham, England, she won the silver medal in the Women's 100 m freestyle S9. Beecroft won the bronze medal in the Women's 100 m butterfly S9 at the 2023 World Para Swimming Championships in Manchester, England.

At the 2024 Paris Paralympics, she won the gold medal in Mixed 4×100 m freestyle relay 34pts and the bronze medal in the Women's 100 m butterfly S9. She finished fourth in the Women's 100 m freestyle S9. At the 2025 World Para Swimming Championships in Singapore, she won two bronze medals - Women's 100 m Butterfly S9 and the Mixed 4 x 100 m Medley Relay 34pts.

== Recognition ==
- 2016 - Victorian Young Athlete of the Year.
- 2022 - University of the Sunshine Coast Sportsperson of the Year
- 2023 - University of the Sunshine Coast Sportsperson of the Year
- 2024 - Swimming Australia Swimmers Swimmer of The Year Award
- 2025 - Medal of the Order of Australia (OAM) for service to sport as a gold medallist at the Paris Paralympic Games 2024.
