= Madeleine Scott =

Australian Paralympic swimmer

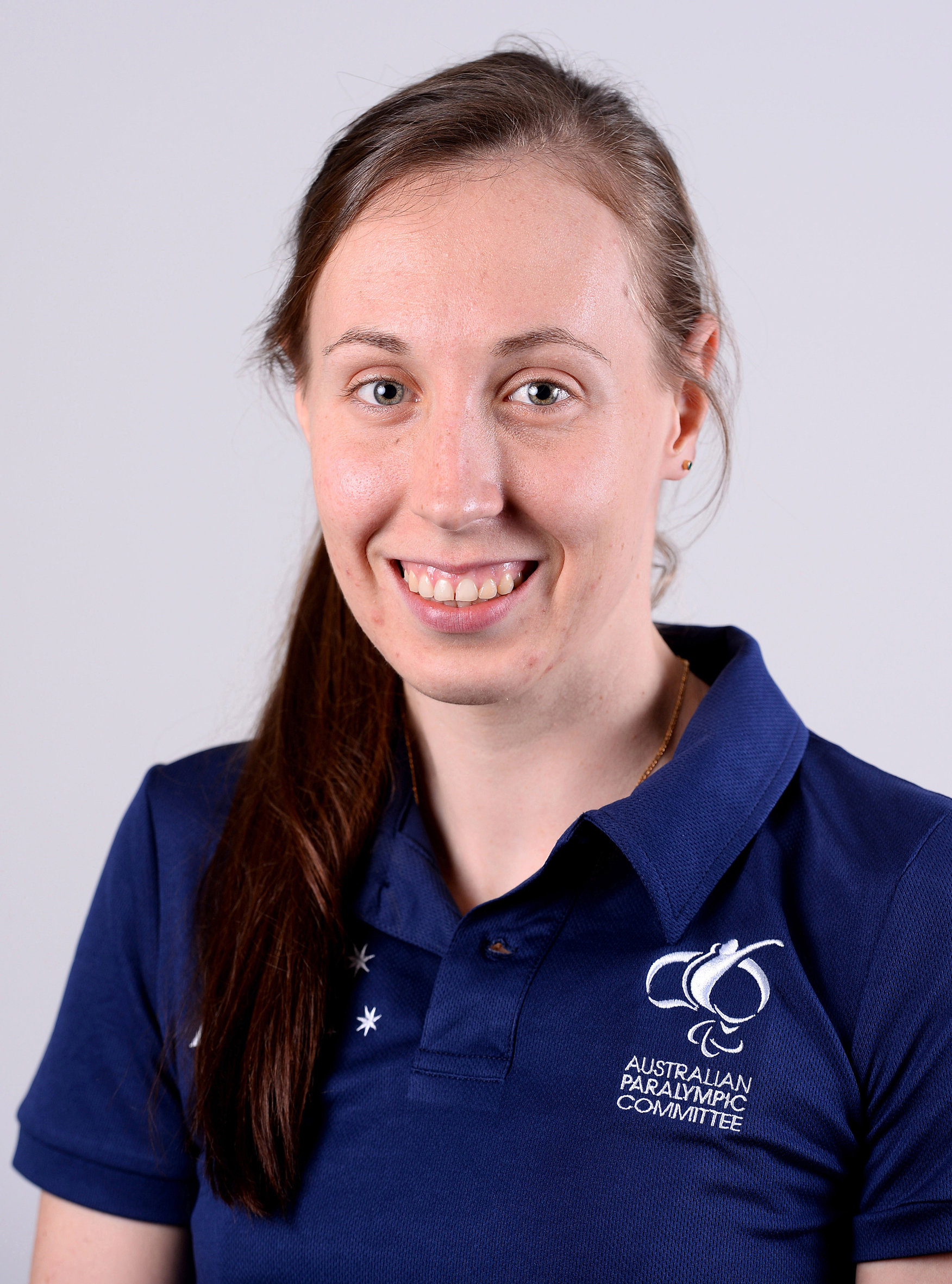
- 2016 Australian Paralympic team portrait

Personal information
- Nationality: Australia
- Born: 11 February 1993 (age 33) Perth, Western Australia

Sport
- Sport: Swimming
- Club: South Lake
- Coach: Yuriy Vdovychenko
Medal record
Women's paralympic swimming
Representing Australia
Paralympic Games
| Silver medal – second place | 2016 Rio de Janeiro | 4 x 100 m medley |
IPC Swimming World Championships
| Silver medal – second place | 2015 Glasgow | 4 x 100 m medley |
Commonwealth Games
| Silver medal – second place | 2014 Glasgow | 100 m breastroke SB9 |
| Bronze medal – third place | 2018 Gold Coast | 100 m breastroke SB8 |

Madeleine Scott (born 11 February 1993) is an Australian Paralympic swimmer and has won silver medals at the 2015 IPC Swimming World Championships, 2014 Commonwealth Games and the 2016 Rio Paralympics.

== Personal ==
Scott was born on 11 February 1993 in Perth, Western Australia. She has erb's palsy. In 2016, she was studying to be dental nurse.

== Career ==
Scott began swimming at the age of 13 for the South Lake Dolphins club in Perth. In 2010, she broke the world record S9 50m butterfly, beating the world record by three tenths of a second, touching in at a time of 32.26. She experienced success at the 2014 Commonwealth games achieving silver in the 100m breastroke SB9 classification. Scott also finished 4th in the 200m individual medley in the SM10 classification. Scott broke the world record S9 50m butterfly beating the world record by three tenths of a second touching in at a time of 32.26.

At the 2015 IPC Swimming World Championships in Glasgow, Scotland, she won a silver medal in the Women's 4 × 100 m Medley Relay 34 Points, finished fourth in the Women's 100m Breaststroke SB9 and sixth in the 100m Butterfly S9 and 200m Individual Medley SM9.

At the 2016 Rio Paralympic Games, Scott won her first Paralympic silver medal in the Women's 4 × 100 m Relay Medley (34 Points) alongside Ellie Cole, Maddison Elliott and Lakeisha Patterson. SHe also competed in the following events but didn't progress to the finals: Women's 100m Butterfly S9, Women's 100m Breaststroke SB9, Women's 200m Individual Medley SM9.

In 2015, she was training at the Australian Institute of Sport under head coach Yuriy Vdovychenko.

== Recognition ==
- 2009 – Wheelchair Sports Western Australia Junior Athlete of the Year
