= Katarina Roxon =

Canadian para swimmer (born 1993)

Personal information
- Full name: Katarina Mirabelle Roxon
- Born: April 5, 1993 (age 33) Kippens, Newfoundland, Canada
- Height: 160 cm (5 ft 3 in)

Sport
- Country: Canada
- Sport: Para swimming
- Strokes: Medley swimming, backstroke, breaststroke, freestyle
- Coach: Leonard Roxon
Medal record
Women's para swimming
Representing Canada
Summer Paralympic Games
Gold medal – first place	2016 Rio de Janeiro	100m breaststroke SB8
Bronze medal – third place	2020 Tokyo	4x100m freestyle 34pts
World Championships
Silver medal – second place	2013 Montreal	4x100m freestyle relay
Silver medal – second place	2019 London	100m breaststroke SB8
Bronze medal – third place	2015 Glasgow	100m breaststroke SB8
Bronze medal – third place	2019 London	4x100m freestyle relay
Bronze medal – third place	2022 Madeira	100m breaststroke SB8
Bronze medal – third place	2023 Manchester	100m breaststroke SB8
Parapan American Games
Gold medal – first place	2007 Rio de Janeiro	4x100m medley relay
Gold medal – first place	2015 Toronto	100m breaststroke SB8
Silver medal – second place	2007 Rio de Janeiro	100m breaststroke SB8
Silver medal – second place	2007 Rio de Janeiro	200m individual medley SM8
Silver medal – second place	2015 Toronto	200m individual medley SM8
Silver medal – second place	2015 Toronto	400m freestyle S8
Silver medal – second place	2015 Toronto	50m freestyle S8
Bronze medal – third place	2007 Rio de Janeiro	50m freestyle S8
Bronze medal – third place	2015 Toronto	100m backstroke S8
Bronze medal – third place	2015 Toronto	100m freestyle S8
Canadian Swimming Championships
Gold medal – first place	2017	200m individual medley SM8

Katarina Mirabelle Roxon ONL (born April 5, 1993) is a medal-winning Canadian para swimmer and a five-time member of Canada's Paralympic Team.

== Career ==
She began her Paralympic career at the 2008 Summer Paralympics in Beijing, China, where at age 15, she was the youngest swimmer on the Canadian team and placed 12th in the 100m breaststroke. Four years later at the London 2012 Paralympic Games she rose seven spots to fifth.

In 2016, she won a gold medal in the 100 metre breaststroke at the 2016 Summer Paralympics in Rio de Janeiro and was the only representative of Canada there in S9, SB8 and SM9 disability classifications.

In 2017, Roxon swam 200-metre individual medley at the Canadian Swimming Championships and won two medals, one of which was gold.

Roxon won a bronze medal at the 2020 Summer Paralympics, in Women's 34pts 4x100m relay.

She was selected to be Canada's flagbearer for the opening ceremony Parade of Nations at the 2024 Summer Paralympics in Paris, along with veteran basketball medallist Patrick Anderson. She will be the first Canadian female swimmer to compete at five Paralympics, dating back to her first Games in 2008 at Beijing.

== Achievements ==
- 2008 Paralympic Games 12th 100-m breaststroke
- 2010 Commonwealth Games 6th 50-m freestyle, 5th 100-m freestyle and 100-m butterfly
- 2012 Paralympic Games 5th 100-m breaststroke
- 2014 Commonwealth Games 5th 100-m breaststroke and 200-m individual medley
- 2014 Pan Pacific Para-swimming Championships 2nd 200-m individual medley
- 2014 Pan Pacific Para-swimming Championships 1st 100-m breaststroke
- 2015 East Coast Short Course Swimming Championships - World Record 200m Butterfly

== Recognitions ==
Roxon was included on the "2016 Most Influential Women List" by the Canadian Association for the Advancement of Women and Sport and Physical Activity.

Roxon with "nubs up" friends and fellow medalists on the podium at the 2016 Rio Paralympics Games selected as one of the 52 best pictures of the Rio Paralympics by Business Insider Magazine.

Katarina Roxon was selected for Women's History Month in Canada as one of the most influential women who is making history in Newfoundland & Labrador and in Canada.

Roxon is a Community Hero in the province of Newfoundland and Labrador.

In 2016, she was a speaker at the Easter Seals Canada.

In 2018, Roxon was appointed to the Order of Newfoundland and Labrador.

== Legacy ==
KATARINA ROXON WAY - Highway (Route 490) named after Roxon.
