= Paralympics New Zealand =

National Paralympic Committee of New Zealand

National Paralympic Committee
- Country: New Zealand
- Code: NZL
- Created: 1968
- Continental association: OPC
- Headquarters: Parnell, Auckland
- President: Jana Rangooni
- Website: paralympics.org.nz

Paralympics New Zealand (PNZ) is the National Paralympic Committee in New Zealand for the Paralympic Games movement. It oversees the means by which New Zealand participates at the Summer Paralympics and the Winter Paralympics.

PNZ is affiliated to the International Paralympic Committee as the National Paralympic Committee for New Zealand. It is one of 170 NPC's worldwide, responsible for supporting and growing Paralympic Sports in their countries.

PNZ is a charity overseeing up to 22 Paralympic Sports disciplines and delivery of the High Performance Sports Programme within a number of disciplines. PNZ prepares, selects and leads New Zealand teams to international competitions and the Paralympic Games.

PNZ works with athletes, members, partners and government agencies to inspire those living with a disability in New Zealand society and increase awareness, understanding and acceptance of disability amongst the wider public.

== See also ==
- List of New Zealand Paralympians
- New Zealand at the Paralympics
- New Zealand Olympic Committee
