= Swimming at the 2016 Summer Paralympics – Women's 50 metre freestyle S10 =

Women's 50 metre freestyle S10 at the XV Paralympic Games
- Venue: Olympic Aquatics Stadium
- Dates: 9 September 2016
- Competitors: 21 from 15 nations

Medalists
1st place, gold medalist(s)		Aurélie Rivard	Canada
2nd place, silver medalist(s)		Sophie Pascoe	New Zealand
3rd place, bronze medalist(s)		Yi Chen	China

The women's 50 metre freestyle S10 event at the 2016 Paralympic Games took place on 9 September 2016, at the Olympic Aquatics Stadium. Three heats were held. The swimmers with the eight fastest times advanced to the final.

== Heats ==
=== Heat 1 ===
10:15 9 September 2016:

Rank	Lane	Name	Nationality	Time	Notes
1	5	Chantal Molenkamp	Netherlands	28.99	Q
2	4	Chantalle Zijderveld	Netherlands	29.06	Q
3	2	Meng Zhang	China	29.29	
4	3	Isabel Yinghua Hernandez Santos	Spain	30.00	
4	7	Paige Leonhardt	Australia	30.00	
6	6	Aliaksandra Svadkouskaya	Belarus	30.52	
7	1	Krista Morkore	Faroe Islands	32.54	

=== Heat 2 ===
10:18 9 September 2016:

Rank	Lane	Name	Nationality	Time	Notes
1	4	Sophie Pascoe	New Zealand	27.95	Q PR
2	5	Elodie Lorandi	France	28.89	Q
3	6	Lina Watz	Sweden	28.93	Q
4	3	Mariana Ribeiro	Brazil	29.02	Q
5	7	Anaelle Roulet	France	30.45	
6	2	Airi Ike	Japan	31.04	
7	1	Shireen Sapiro	South Africa	31.89	

=== Heat 3 ===
10:20 9 September 2016:

Rank	Lane	Name	Nationality	Time	Notes
1	4	Aurélie Rivard	Canada	27.83	PR Q
2	5	Yi Chen	China	28.20	Q
3	3	Marije Oosterhuis	Netherlands	29.39	
4	6	Oliwia Jablonska	Poland	29.41	
5	7	Monique Murphy	Australia	29.81	
6	2	Stefanny Rubi Cristino Zapata	Mexico	30.47	
7	1	Samantha Ryan	Canada	30.98	

== Final ==
18:35 9 September 2016:

Rank	Lane	Name	Nationality	Time	Notes
1st place, gold medalist(s)	4	Aurélie Rivard	Canada	27.37	WR
2nd place, silver medalist(s)	5	Sophie Pascoe	New Zealand	27.72	
3rd place, bronze medalist(s)	3	Yi Chen	China	28.21	
4	8	Chantalle Zijderveld	Netherlands	28.26	
5	6	Elodie Lorandi	France	28.34	
6	7	Chantal Molenkamp	Netherlands	28.93	
7	1	Mariana Ribeiro	Brazil	29.30	
8	2	Lina Watz	Sweden	29.69	
