= Swimming at the 2016 Summer Paralympics – Women's 100 metre freestyle S10 =

Women's 100 metre freestyle S10 at the XV Paralympic Games
- Venue: Olympic Aquatics Stadium
- Dates: 13 September 2016
- Competitors: 19 from 14 nations

Medalists
1st place, gold medalist(s)		Aurelie Rivard	Canada
2nd place, silver medalist(s)		Sophie Pascoe	New Zealand
3rd place, bronze medalist(s)		Elodie Lorandi	France

The women's 100 metre freestyle S10 event at the 2016 Paralympic Games took place on 13 September 2016, at the Olympic Aquatics Stadium. Three heats were held. The swimmers with the eight fastest times advanced to the final.

== Heats ==
=== Heat 1 ===
10:37 13 September 2016:

Rank	Lane	Name	Nationality	Time	Notes
1	4	Elodie Lorandi	France	1:02.24	Q
2	5	Yi Chen	China	1:02.79	Q
3	3	Stefanny Rubi Cristino Zapata	Mexico	1:03.44	Q
4	6	Anaelle Roulet	France	1:05.31	
5	2	Airi Ike	Japan	1:06.30	
6	7	Krista Morkore	Faroe Islands	1:12.34	

=== Heat 2 ===
10:40 13 September 2016:

Rank	Lane	Name	Nationality	Time	Notes
1	4	Sophie Pascoe	New Zealand	1:01.54	Q
2	5	Lisa Kruger	Netherlands	1:02.73	Q
3	6	Mariana Ribeiro	Brazil	1:02.84	Q
4	3	Alice Tai	Great Britain	1:04.32	
5	2	Isabel Yinghua Hernandez Santos	Spain	1:05.03	
6	7	Paige Leonhardt	Australia	1:07.24	

=== Heat 3 ===
10:43 13 September 2016:

Rank	Lane	Name	Nationality	Time	Notes
1	4	Aurelie Rivard	Canada	59.89	PR Q
2	5	Marije Oosterhuis	Netherlands	1:03.16	Q
3	3	Chantalle Zijderveld	Netherlands	1:03.84	
4	6	Monique Murphy	Australia	1:04.16	
5	2	Lina Watz	Sweden	1:05.74	
6	7	Samantha Ryan	Canada	1:08.65	
7	1	Shireen Sapiro	South Africa	1:08.90	

== Final ==
18:16 13 September 2016:

Rank	Lane	Name	Nationality	Time	Notes
1st place, gold medalist(s)	4	Aurelie Rivard	Canada	59.31	PR
2nd place, silver medalist(s)	5	Sophie Pascoe	New Zealand	59.85	
3rd place, bronze medalist(s)	3	Elodie Lorandi	France	1:01.13	
4	2	Yi Chen	China	1:01.76	
5	6	Lisa Kruger	Netherlands	1:02.67	
6	7	Mariana Ribeiro	Brazil	1:02.75	
7	1	Marije Oosterhuis	Netherlands	1:02.78	
8	8	Stefanny Rubi Cristino Zapata	Mexico	1:03.54	
