= Swimming at the 2016 Summer Paralympics – Women's 400 metre freestyle =

The women's 400 m freestyle swimming events for the 2016 Summer Paralympics take place at the Rio Olympic Stadium from 8 to 15 September. A total of seven events are contested for seven different classifications.

== Competition format ==
Each event consists of two rounds: heats and final. The top eight swimmers overall in the heats progress to the final. If there are eight or fewer swimmers in an event, no heats are held and all swimmers qualify for the final.

== Results ==
=== S6 ===
The S6 event took place on 13 September.

Rank	Lane	Name	Nationality	Time	Notes
1st place, gold medalist(s)	4	Yelyzaveta Mereshko	Ukraine	5:17.01	WR
2nd place, silver medalist(s)	5	Song Lingling	China	5:21.37	AS
3rd place, bronze medalist(s)	3	Ellie Simmonds	Great Britain	5:24.87	
4	6	Ellie Robinson	Great Britain	5:27.53	
5	2	Viktoriia Savtsova	Ukraine	5:36.07	
6	1	Vianney Trejo Delgadillo	Mexico	5:48.19	
7	8	Emanuela Romano	Italy	5:51.05	
8	7	Nicole Turner	Ireland	5:54.61	

=== S7 ===
The S7 event took place on 14 September.

Rank	Lane	Name	Nationality	Time	Notes
1st place, gold medalist(s)	4	McKenzie Coan	United States	5:05.77	
2nd place, silver medalist(s)	5	Cortney Jordan	United States	5:18.20	
3rd place, bronze medalist(s)	6	Susannah Rodgers	Great Britain	5:23.17	
4	3	Rebecca Dubber	New Zealand	5:31.53	
5	7	Verena Schott	Germany	5:41.47	
6	2	Vajing Huang	China	5:44.72	
7	1	Ariana Talamona	Italy	5:48.37	
8	8	Erel Halevi	Israel	5:51.05	

=== S8 ===
The S8 event took place on 8 September.

Rank	Lane	Name	Nationality	Time	Notes
1st place, gold medalist(s)	5	Lakeisha Patterson	Australia	4:40.33	WR
2nd place, silver medalist(s)	4	Jessica Long	United States	4:47.82	
3rd place, bronze medalist(s)	3	Stephanie Millward	Great Britain	4:49.49	
4	6	Maddison Elliott	Australia	5:02.13	
5	2	Amalie Vinther	Denmark	5:12.01	
6	8	Abi Tripp	Canada	5:16.25	
7	7	Brickelle Bro	United States	5:16.38	
8	1	Vendula Duskova	Czech Republic	5:20.31	

=== S9 ===
The S9 event took place on 9 September.

Rank	Lane	Name	Nationality	Time	Notes
1st place, gold medalist(s)	2	Nuria Marques Soto	Spain	4:42.56	
2nd place, silver medalist(s)	4	Ellie Cole	Australia	4:42.58	OC
3rd place, bronze medalist(s)	5	Xu Jialing	China	4:43.66	AS
4	3	Manon Vermarien	Netherlands	4:53.42	
5	6	Amy Marren	Great Britain	4:55.38	
6	1	Zsofia Konkoly	Hungary	4:55.77	
7	7	Emily Gray	South Africa	4:59.18	
8	8	Natalie Sims	United States	5:04.88	

=== S10 ===
The S10 event took place on 15 September.

Rank	Lane	Name	Nationality	Time	Notes
1st place, gold medalist(s)	4	Aurelie Rivard	Canada	4:29.96	WR
2nd place, silver medalist(s)	2	Monique Murphy	Australia	4:35.09	
3rd place, bronze medalist(s)	6	Elodie Lorandi	France	4:35.49	
4	7	Oliwia Jablonska	Poland	4:35.52	
5	5	Bianka Pap	Hungary	4:41.11	
6	3	Stefanny Rubi Cristino Zapata	Mexico	4:45.04	
7	1	Marije Oosterhuis	Netherlands	4:48.13	
8	8	Anaelle Roulet	France	4:53.59	

=== S11 ===
The S11 event took place on 10 September.

Rank	Lane	Name	Nationality	Time	Notes
1st place, gold medalist(s)	2	Liesette Bruinsma	Netherlands	5:15.08	
2nd place, silver medalist(s)	4	Cecilia Camellini	Italy	5:16.36	
3rd place, bronze medalist(s)	5	Xie Qing	China	5:25.14	AS
4	6	Mary Fisher	New Zealand	5:28.28	
5	3	Daniela Schulte	Germany	5:29.93	
6	1	Cai Liwen	China	5:35.82	
7	7	Olga Iakibiuk	Ukraine	5:46.06	
8	8	Li Guizhi	China	5:52.79	

=== S13 ===
The S13 event took place on 12 September.

Rank	Lane	Name	Nationality	Time	Notes
1st place, gold medalist(s)	4	Rebecca Meyers	United States	4:19.59	WR
2nd place, silver medalist(s)	5	Anna Stetsenko	Ukraine	4:24.18	
3rd place, bronze medalist(s)	2	Ariadna Edo Beltran	Spain	4:35.49	
4	3	Naomi Maike Schnittger	Germany	4:43.57	
5	6	Alessia Berra	Italy	4:44.52	
6	1	Abby Kane	Great Britain	4:49.27	
7	7	Katja Dedekind	Australia	4:50.43	
8	8	Marta Maria Gomez Battelli	Spain	4:54.14	
