= Swimming at the 2016 Summer Paralympics – Women's 400 metre freestyle S10 =

Women's 400 metre freestyle S10 at the XV Paralympic Games
- Venue: Olympic Aquatics Stadium
- Dates: 15 September 2016
- Competitors: 10 from 9 nations

Medalists
| 1st place, gold medalist(s) | | Aurelie Rivard | Canada |
| 2nd place, silver medalist(s) | | Monique Murphy | Australia |
| 3rd place, bronze medalist(s) | | Elodie Lorandi | France |

The women's 400 metre freestyle S10 event at the 2016 Paralympic Games took place on 15 September 2016, at the Olympic Aquatics Stadium. Two heats were held. The swimmers with the eight fastest times advanced to the final.

== Heats ==
=== Heat 1 ===
10:18 15 September 2016:

| Rank | Lane | Name | Nationality | Time | Notes |
|---|---|---|---|---|---|
| 1 | 4 | Monique Murphy | Australia | 4:46.58 | Q |
| 2 | 5 | Oliwia Jablonska | Poland | 4:47.30 | Q |
| 3 | 6 | Marije Oosterhuis | Netherlands | 4:48.71 | Q |
| 4 | 3 | Anaelle Roulet | France | 4:51.03 | Q |
| 5 | 2 | Krista Morkore | Faroe Islands | 5:18.50 | |

=== Heat 2 ===
10:25 15 September 2016:

| Rank | Lane | Name | Nationality | Time | Notes |
|---|---|---|---|---|---|
| 1 | 4 | Aurelie Rivard | Canada | 4:40.86 | Q |
| 2 | 6 | Bianka Pap | Hungary | 4:42.81 | Q |
| 3 | 3 | Stefanny Rubi Cristino Zapata | Mexico | 4:43.98 | Q |
| 4 | 5 | Elodie Lorandi | France | 4:45.13 | Q |
| 5 | 2 | Lina Watz | Sweden | 4:57.62 | |

== Final ==
18:07 15 September 2016:

| Rank | Lane | Name | Nationality | Time | Notes |
|---|---|---|---|---|---|
| 1st place, gold medalist(s) | 4 | Aurelie Rivard | Canada | 4:29.96 | WR |
| 2nd place, silver medalist(s) | 2 | Monique Murphy | Australia | 4:35.09 | |
| 3rd place, bronze medalist(s) | 6 | Elodie Lorandi | France | 4:35.49 | |
| 4 | 7 | Oliwia Jablonska | Poland | 4:35.52 | |
| 5 | 5 | Bianka Pap | Hungary | 4:41.11 | |
| 6 | 3 | Stefanny Rubi Cristino Zapata | Mexico | 4:45.04 | |
| 7 | 1 | Marije Oosterhuis | Netherlands | 4:48.13 | |
| 8 | 8 | Anaelle Roulet | France | 4:53.59 | |
