= Swimming at the 2016 Summer Paralympics – Women's 100 metre backstroke S10 =

Women's 100 metre backstroke S10 at the XV Paralympic Games
- Venue: Olympic Aquatics Stadium
- Dates: 10 September 2016
- Competitors: 14 from 12 nations

Medalists
1st place, gold medalist(s)		Sophie Pascoe	New Zealand
2nd place, silver medalist(s)		Bianka Pap	Hungary
3rd place, bronze medalist(s)		Alice Tai	Great Britain

The women's 100 metre backstroke S10 event at the 2016 Paralympic Games took place on 10 September 2016, at the Olympic Aquatics Stadium. Two heats were held. The swimmers with the eight fastest times advanced to the final.

== Heats ==
=== Heat 1 ===
11:15 10 September 2016:

Rank	Lane	Name	Nationality	Time	Notes
1	4	Alice Tai	Great Britain	1:09.64	Q
2	5	Lisa Kruger	Netherlands	1:10.56	Q
3	3	Anaelle Roulet	France	1:12.20	Q
4	7	Mariana Ribeiro	Brazil	1:12.34	Q
5	6	Shireen Sapiro	South Africa	1:13.13	
6	2	Airi Ike	Japan	1:15.33	
7	1	Paige Leonhardt	Australia	1:16.11	

=== Heat 2 ===
11:19 10 September 2016:

Rank	Lane	Name	Nationality	Time	Notes
1	4	Sophie Pascoe	New Zealand	1:07.23	Q
2	5	Bianka Pap	Hungary	1:09.15	Q
3	3	Aurelie Rivard	Canada	1:10.47	Q
4	6	Marije Oosterhuis	Netherlands	1:12.41	Q
5	2	Lina Watz	Sweden	1:13.27	
6	1	Monique Murphy	Australia	1:13.62	
7	7	Isabel Yinghua Hernandez Santos	Spain	1:15.95	

== Final ==
19:31 10 September 2016:

Rank	Lane	Name	Nationality	Time	Notes
1st place, gold medalist(s)	4	Sophie Pascoe	New Zealand	1:07.04	
2nd place, silver medalist(s)	5	Bianka Pap	Hungary	1:07.95	
3rd place, bronze medalist(s)	3	Alice Tai	Great Britain	1:09.39	
4	6	Aurelie Rivard	Canada	1:09.62	
5	2	Lisa Kruger	Netherlands	1:10.59	
6	1	Mariana Ribeiro	Brazil	1:11.03	
7	7	Anaelle Roulet	France	1:12.21	
8	8	Marije Oosterhuis	Netherlands	1:13.07	
