= Swimming at the 2012 Summer Paralympics – Women's 100 metre backstroke S10 =

Women's 100m Backstroke S10 at the XIV Paralympic Games
- Venue: London Aquatics Centre
- Dates: 4 September
- Competitors: 13 from 11 nations
- Winning time: 1:05.90

Medalists
1st place, gold medalist(s)		Summer Ashley Mortimer	Canada
2nd place, silver medalist(s)		Sophie Pascoe	New Zealand
3rd place, bronze medalist(s)		Shireen Sapiro	South Africa

The women's 100m backstroke S10 event at the 2012 Summer Paralympics took place at the London Aquatics Centre on 4 September. There were two heats; the swimmers with the eight fastest times advanced to the final.

== Results ==
=== Heats ===
Competed from 10:46.

==== Heat 1 ====
Rank	Lane	Name	Nationality	Time	Notes
1	4	Sophie Pascoe	New Zealand	1:07.77	Q, PR
2	5	Katherine Downie	Australia	1:12.50	Q
3	3	Susan Beth Scott	United States	1:12.95	Q
4	6	Marije Oosterhuis	Netherlands	1:14.42	
5	2	Esther Morales Fernández	Spain	1:16.46	
6	7	Francisca Castro	Chile	1:17.71	

==== Heat 2 ====
Rank	Lane	Name	Nationality	Time	Notes
1	5	Shireen Sapiro	South Africa	1:09.46	Q, AF
2	4	Summer Ashley Mortimer	Canada	1:09.92	Q
3	3	Nina Ryabova	Russia	1:11.46	Q
4	6	Aurelie Rivard	Canada	1:12.70	Q
5	2	Anaelle Roulet	France	1:14.16	Q
6	7	Isabel Yinghua Hernandez Santos	Spain	1:16.66	
7	1	Katarzyna Pawlik	Poland	1:18.49	

=== Final ===
Competed at 18:42.

Rank	Lane	Name	Nationality	Time	Notes
1st place, gold medalist(s)	3	Summer Ashley Mortimer	Canada	1:05.90	WR
2nd place, silver medalist(s)	4	Sophie Pascoe	New Zealand	1:06.69	OC
3rd place, bronze medalist(s)	5	Shireen Sapiro	South Africa	1:09.02	AF
4	2	Katherine Downie	Australia	1:11.40	
5	7	Aurelie Rivard	Canada	1:11.92	
6	1	Susan Beth Scott	United States	1:12.07	
7	6	Nina Ryabova	Russia	1:12.27	
8	8	Anaelle Roulet	France	1:13.97	

'Q = qualified for final. WR = World Record. PR = Paralympic Record. AF = African Record. OC = Oceania Record.
