= Swimming at the 2012 Summer Paralympics – Women's 50 metre freestyle S10 =

Women's 50 metre freestyle S10 at the XIV Paralympic Games
- Venue: London Aquatics Centre
- Dates: 31 August
- Competitors: 17 from 12 nations

Medalists
| 1st place, gold medalist(s) | | Summer Mortimer | Canada |
| 2nd place, silver medalist(s) | | Sophie Pascoe | New Zealand |
| 3rd place, bronze medalist(s) | | Élodie Lorandi | France |

The women's 50 metre freestyle S10 event at the 2012 Paralympic Games took place on 31 August, at the London Aquatics Centre.

Three heats were held; one with five swimmers and two with six competitors each. The swimmers with the eight fastest times advanced to the final.

== Heats ==
| Rank | Heat | Lane | Name | Nationality | Time | Notes |
|---|---|---|---|---|---|---|
| 1 | 3 | 4 | Summer Mortimer | Canada | 28.21 | Q, PR |
| 2 | 2 | 4 | Sophie Pascoe | New Zealand | 28.41 | Q |
| 3 | 1 | 4 | Élodie Lorandi | France | 28.95 | Q |
| 4 | 2 | 3 | Nina Ryabova | Russia | 29.15 | Q |
| 5 | 1 | 5 | Susan Beth Scott | United States | 29.28 | Q |
| 6 | 3 | 6 | Aurelie Rivard | Canada | 29.29 | Q |
| 7 | 3 | 5 | Katherine Downie | Australia | 29.40 | Q |
| 8 | 2 | 5 | Anna Eames | United States | 29.72 | Q |
| 9 | 1 | 3 | Esther Morales | Spain | 29.92 | |
| 10 | 1 | 6 | Harriet Lee | Great Britain | 29.97 | |
| 11 | 3 | 3 | Chantal Molenkamp | Netherlands | 30.09 | |
| 12 | 1 | 2 | Marije Oosterhuis | Netherlands | 30.24 | |
| 13 | 2 | 6 | Brianna Jennett-McNeill | Canada | 30.24 | |
| 14 | 3 | 7 | Oliwia Jablonska | Poland | 30.58 | |
| 15 | 2 | 7 | Shireen Sapiro | South Africa | 30.87 | AF |
| 16 | 3 | 2 | Park Semi | South Korea | 31.02 | |
| 17 | 2 | 2 | Katarzyna Pawlik | Poland | 31.37 | |

== Final ==
| Rank | Lane | Name | Nationality | Time | Notes |
|---|---|---|---|---|---|
| 1st place, gold medalist(s) | 4 | Summer Mortimer | Canada | 28.10 | WR |
| 2nd place, silver medalist(s) | 5 | Sophie Pascoe | New Zealand | 28.24 | |
| 3rd place, bronze medalist(s) | 3 | Élodie Lorandi | France | 28.67 | EU |
| 4 | 6 | Nina Ryabova | Russia | 28.85 | |
| 5 | 2 | Susan Beth Scott | United States | 28.92 | |
| 6 | 7 | Aurelie Rivard | Canada | 28.98 | |
| 7 | 1 | Katherine Downie | Australia | 29.10 | |
| 8 | 8 | Anna Eames | United States | 29.41 | |
