= Swimming at the 2012 Summer Paralympics – Women's 100 metre freestyle S10 =

Women's 100m Freestyle S10 at the XIV Paralympic Games
- Venue: London Aquatics Centre
- Dates: 6 September
- Competitors: 15 from 11 nations
- Winning time: 1:00.89

Medalists
1st place, gold medalist(s)		Sophie Pascoe	New Zealand
2nd place, silver medalist(s)		Elodie Lorandi	France
3rd place, bronze medalist(s)		Summer Ashley Mortimer	Canada

The women's 100m freestyle S10 event at the 2012 Summer Paralympics took place at the London Aquatics Centre on 6 September. There were two heats; the swimmers with the eight fastest times advanced to the final.

== Results ==
=== Heats ===
Competed from 11:43.

==== Heat 1 ====
Rank	Lane	Name	Nationality	Time	Notes
1	4	Summer Ashley Mortimer	Canada	1:01.98	Q
2	3	Katherine Downie	Australia	1:03.16	Q
3	5	Susan Beth Scott	United States	1:03.49	Q
4	6	Esther Morales Fernández	Spain	1:05.03	
5	2	Brianna Jennett-Mcneill	Canada	1:05.09	
6	7	Chantal Molenkamp	Netherlands	1:06.52	
7	1	Park Semi	South Korea	1:08.13	

==== Heat 2 ====
Rank	Lane	Name	Nationality	Time	Notes
1	4	Sophie Pascoe	New Zealand	1:01.17	Q, PR
2	5	Elodie Lorandi	France	1:01.87	Q
3	2	Aurelie Rivard	Canada	1:03.27	Q
4	3	Anna Eames	United States	1:03.37	Q
5	1	Oliwia Jablonska	Poland	1:04.89	Q
6	6	Katarzyna Pawlik	Poland	1:07.14	
7	7	Gemma Almond	Great Britain	1:07.40	
8	8	Shireen Sapiro	South Africa	1:07.42	AF

=== Final ===
Competed at 20:27.

Rank	Lane	Name	Nationality	Time	Notes
1st place, gold medalist(s)	4	Sophie Pascoe	New Zealand	1:00.89	PR
2nd place, silver medalist(s)	5	Elodie Lorandi	France	1:01.09	EU
3rd place, bronze medalist(s)	3	Summer Ashley Mortimer	Canada	1:01.58	
4	2	Aurelie Rivard	Canada	1:02.12	
5	6	Katherine Downie	Australia	1:02.34	
6	7	Anna Eames	United States	1:02.72	
7	1	Susan Beth Scott	United States	1:02.82	
8	8	Oliwia Jablonska	Poland	1:03.76	

'Q = qualified for final. PR = Paralympic Record. EU = European Record. AF = African Record.
