= Swimming at the 2012 Summer Paralympics – Women's 400 metre freestyle S10 =

Women's 400m Freestyle S10 at the XIV Paralympic Games
- Venue: London Aquatics Centre
- Dates: 5 September
- Competitors: 11 from 8 nations
- Winning time: 4:34.55

Medalists
1st place, gold medalist(s)		Élodie Lorandi	France
2nd place, silver medalist(s)		Aurelie Rivard	Canada
3rd place, bronze medalist(s)		Susan Beth Scott	United States

The women's 400m freestyle S10 event at the 2012 Summer Paralympics took place at the London Aquatics Centre on 5 September. There were two heats; the swimmers with the eight fastest times advanced to the final.

== Results ==
=== Heats ===
Competed from 10:11.

==== Heat 1 ====
Rank	Lane	Name	Nationality	Time	Notes
1	4	Élodie Lorandi	France	4:42.86	Q
2	5	Aurelie Rivard	Canada	4:45.06	Q
3	2	Katherine Downie	Australia	4:57.28	Q
4	6	Shireen Sapiro	South Africa	4:59.54	Q, AF
5	3	Gemma Almond	Great Britain	5:07.43	

==== Heat 2 ====
Rank	Lane	Name	Nationality	Time	Notes
1	4	Susan Beth Scott	United States	4:40.00	Q
2	5	Katarzyna Pawlik	Poland	4:43.45	Q
3	3	Oliwia Jablonska	Poland	4:51.67	Q
4	6	Anaelle Roulet	France	4:57.85	Q
5	2	Jennett-McNeill Brianna	Canada	5:01.94	
6	7	Marije Oosterhuis	Netherlands	5:03.80	

=== Final ===
Competed at 17:58.

Rank	Lane	Name	Nationality	Time	Notes
1st place, gold medalist(s)	5	Élodie Lorandi	France	4:34.55	
2nd place, silver medalist(s)	6	Aurelie Rivard	Canada	4:36.46	
3rd place, bronze medalist(s)	4	Susan Beth Scott	United States	4:37.23	
4	2	Oliwia Jablonska	Poland	4:41.65	
5	3	Katarzyna Pawlik	Poland	4:45.50	
6	7	Katherine Downie	Australia	4:53.59	
7	1	Anaelle Roulet	France	5:00.20	
8	8	Shireen Sapiro	South Africa	5:01.30	

'Q = qualified for final. AF = African Record.
