= Summer Mortimer =

Broadcaster, actress, former Paralympic swimmer (born 1993)

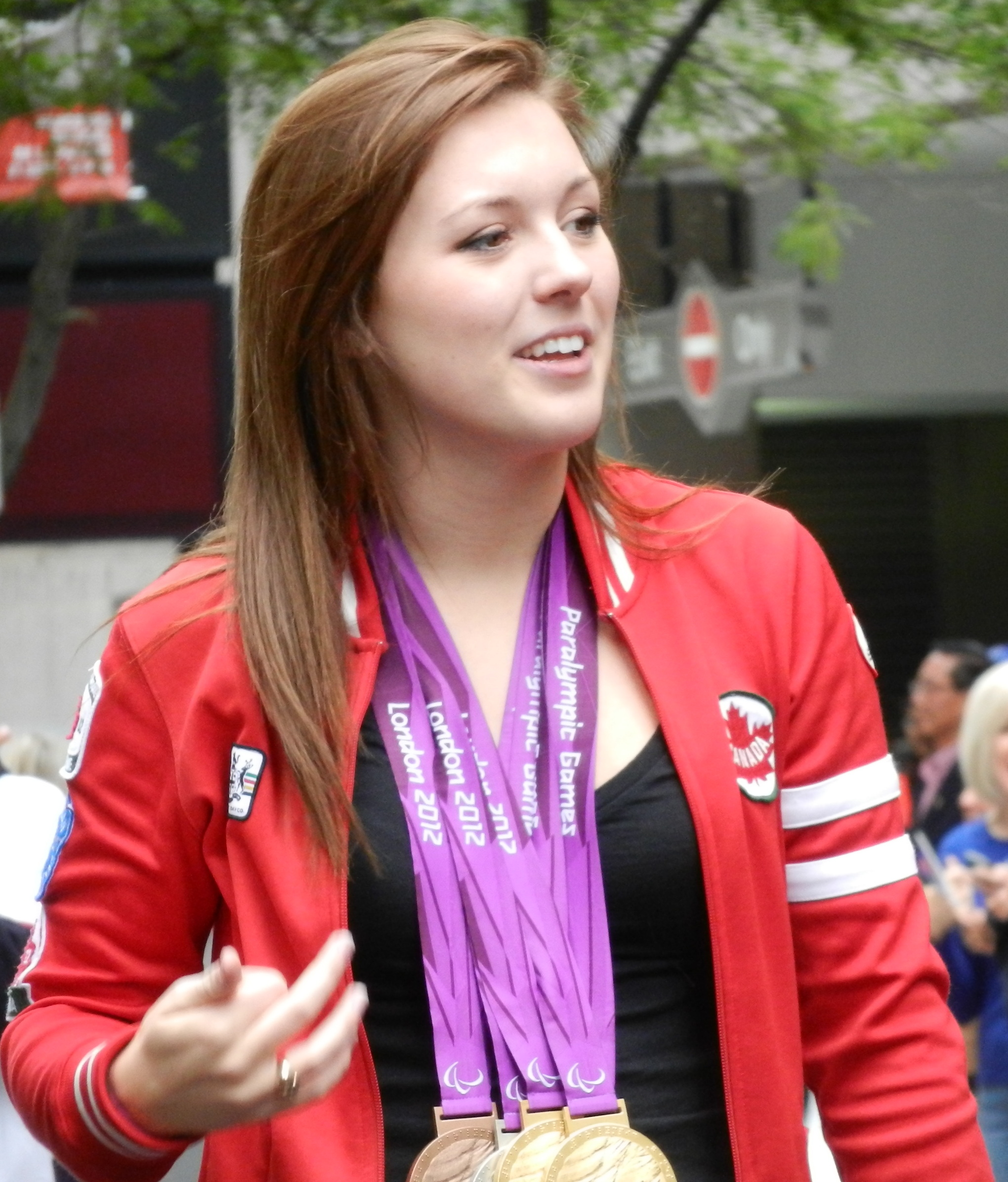
- Mortimer at the Olympic Heroes Parade in Toronto, September 2012

Personal information
- Full name: Summer Ashley Mortimer
- Nickname: The Storm
- Nationality: Canadian, Dutch
- Born: April 22, 1993 (age 33)
- Height: 1.73 m (68 in)
- Weight: 61 kg (134 lb)

Sport
- Sport: Swimming
- Club: Ducks Swimming Club
- Coach: Reg Chappell (current); Craig Mortimer (her father)
Medal record
Representing Canada
Paralympic Games
Gold medal – first place	2012 London	50 m freestyle S10
Gold medal – first place	2012 London	100 m backstroke S10
Silver medal – second place	2012 London	200 m individual medley SM10
Bronze medal – third place	2012 London	Women's 100m freestyle – S10
IPC World Championships
Gold medal – first place	2010 Eindhoven	50m freestyle S10
Gold medal – first place	2010 Eindhoven	100m freestyle S10
Gold medal – first place	2010 Eindhoven	100m backstroke S10
Gold medal – first place	2010 Eindhoven	200m medley SM10
Representing Netherlands
IPC World Championships
Gold medal – first place	2015 Glasgow	100m backstroke S10
Bronze medal – third place	2015 Glasgow	100m freestyle S10
IPC European Championships
Gold medal – first place	2014 Eindhoven	50m freestyle S10
Gold medal – first place	2014 Eindhoven	100m backstroke S10
Silver medal – second place	2014 Eindhoven	100m freestyle S10

Summer Ashley Mortimer (born April 22, 1993) is a Canadian-Dutch former paraswimmer who competed internationally for Canada, and later the Netherlands national paralympic team, an artist, a performing artist, and CBC Sports personality.

Mortimer won seven world-championship finals for Canada and the Netherlands, and four medals for Canada at her first Paralympic Games in London: two gold, one silver and one bronze.

Mortimer competed in the 2008 Canadian Olympic Trials as an able-bodied swimmer, and retrained as a paraswimmer after a trampolining accident. She began competing at the international level in 2010 with an SM10 classification, setting world records in the process (one of which she broke again in qualifying for the 2012 Paralympics). Competing in six events, Mortimer won medals in all four individual races. She holds world records in the S10 50- and 100-metre long-course freestyle and the 50- 100- and 200-metre backstroke. In 2013 Mortimer applied to join the Netherlands national team, and announced her transfer in June 2014. Winning three medals (two gold and one silver) at the 2014 IPC championships, she set two European records. She did not compete in the 2016 Summer Olympics, citing "serious health reasons."

She was a sports analyst for swimming at the 2020 Summer Olympics, on CBC, as well as the 2020 Summer Paralympics, broadcast on CBC and AMI-tv. She also co-hosted with Scott Russell for the 2022 Winter Paralympics and the 2024 Summer Paralympics on the same channels.

== Sports career ==
Mortimer began swimming at age two; her mother is a co-owner of the Oakville Swim Academy. At age nine, she began swimming competitively. As a member of the Hamilton Aquatic Club and the Golden Horseshoe Aquatic Club, Mortimer competed at the 2008 Canadian Olympic Trials for the Beijing games.

She is classified SM10, the least-disabled paraswimming classification. SM10 is open to those with "very minimal weakness affecting the legs; Swimmers with restriction of hip joint movement; Swimmers with both feet deformed; Swimmers with one leg amputated below the knee; Swimmers missing one hand. This is the class with the most physical ability".

=== Paraswimming for Canada ===
A serious injury at a competitive trampolining event shattered most of the bones in Mortimer's feet; she was nationally ranked in the sport. When she began trying to walk again, she relearned swimming.

Unaware that the Worlds were being broadcast, Mortimer was caught by surprise and stuck her tongue out at the camera. Her relaxed attitude continued at the Olympics, where she said that although there may be "some underlying arrogance", she was not consciously trying to send a message to her rivals. Mortimer wears an elastic band which she snaps when aware of a negative thought; "incredibly hard on myself", it helps her realize the frequency of her "down" thinking and changes her mental perspective.

As a former able-bodied competitive swimmer, she is annoyed by the idea held by some able-bodied swimmers that paralympic swimming is a "joke". "The Paralympics are so much harder than the able-bodied side of sport. I know from first hand. It's way harder"; Mortimer said that she knew "truckloads of able-bodied athletes who constantly make fun of the Paralympics". She hopes for a change in attitude, noting how much change fellow medalist Benoit Huot has seen since the 2000 Paralympics in Sydney.

==== World-level competition ====
At the 2010 IPC Swimming World Championships in Eindhoven, Netherlands, Mortimer won four gold medals and set five world records. In November of that year, she was Female Paraswimmer of the Year at Swimming Canada's Big Splash.

At the April 2012 Canadian Olympic and Paralympic Swimming Trials in Montreal, Mortimer aimed to lower her world record in the 50-metre freestyle from 28.30 seconds to about 28.27; she finished in 28.17 seconds. (Note: Mortimer's Canadian Paralympic Swimming Trials results qualified her for a bursary by Investors Group. ("Summer Mortimer awarded 2012 Team Investors Group Amateur Athletes Fund Bursary". Swimming Canada. Ottawa ON. 15 May 2012. Archived from the original on 18 May 2012.)) Between the Trials and the Paralympics, she won the 100-metre backstroke in July at the Canada Cup; this result surprised Mortimer, who had a "rough time" with her feet the previous month. That month, she also won the women's 100-metre S10 at the Speedo Paraswimming CAN-AM in Winnipeg.

==== London Paralympics ====
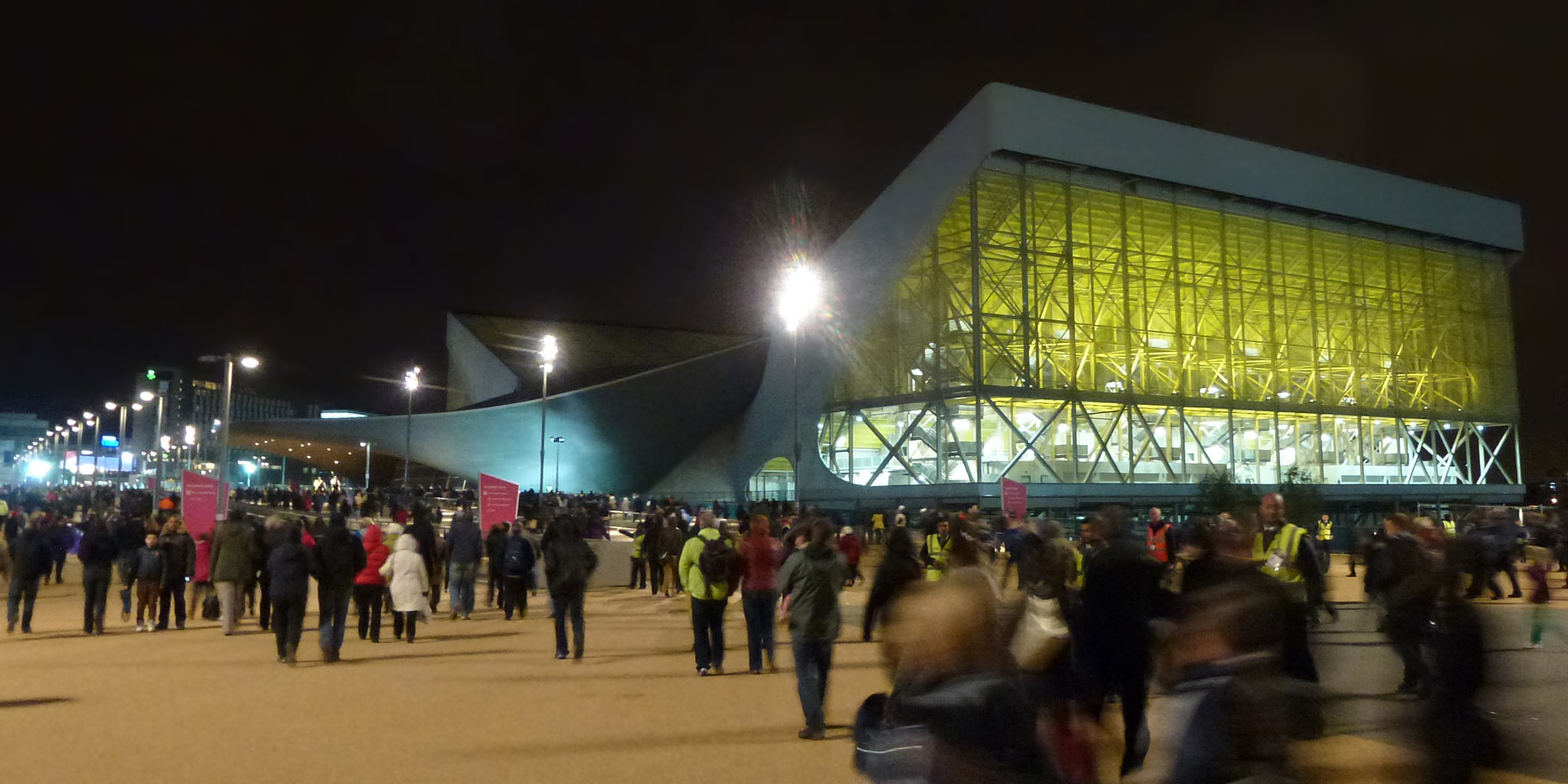
The London Aquatics Centre, where Mortimer won four Paralympic medals

Mortimer qualified for six women's SM10 events at the 2012 London Paralympics—the 200-metre individual medley, 4 × 100 m freestyle relay 34pts, 4 × 100 m medley relay, 50- and 100-metre freestyle and 100-metre backstroke—and expectations for her were high. On August 30, the first day of the competition, Sophie Pascoe of New Zealand won the SM10 200-metre individual medley; Mortimer took the silver medal. For a half-hour before the competition, Mortimer was "bawling her eyes out"; she told The Canadian Press, "[Being] here and meeting all these people made me realize I am so incredibly grateful for the experience I’ve had as a result of my accident. I don’t know if this was part of the journey I was supposed to walk in life but I wouldn’t take it back for the world". The next day, she won the S10 50-metre freestyle gold medal in a record time of 28.10 seconds. Mortimer's time was .07 second faster than her April Trials record, and .14 second faster than Pascoe's time; she went into the race "a bit annoyed" and "mad at anyone who was going to take it from me".

In the preliminary round of the 100-metre backstroke Mortimer placed third, and hoped to be away from "the main people" in the finals to maintain her focus. She won the gold medal in the final on September 4, setting a world record of 1:05.90 after overcoming Pascoe's half-second lead at the turn. Mortimer noted that her time was faster than her best able-bodied time.

In the 100-metre freestyle (her final solo event) Mortimer finished third, 0.69 second behind Pascoe and France's Elodie Lorandi; Canadian Aurelie Rivard finished fourth. Mortimer's bronze was Canada's only medal on day nine of the competition.

As part of the Canadian women's 34-point 4 × 100 m freestyle relay and 4 × 100 m medley relay teams, Mortimer did not medal. Although her freestyle-relay team clocked 4:38.23 (missing the 2000 Canadian record by 0.22 second), they placed seventh in the finals. With Katarina Roxon, Morgan Bird and Brianna Nelson in the medley relay, Mortimer's team finished seventh and last. Her times of 32.35 for the 50-metre and 1:06.37 for the 100-metre were the fastest for her legs of the events. At the 2012 Olympics, Mortimer's four medals were the most for any Canadian athlete or para-athlete.

==== After London ====
Following Mortimer's last individual event at London she said that although she intended to try for the 2013 World Aquatics Championships, the 2015 Parapan American Games, and the 2016 Paralympics, she takes life year-by-year. From October 2012 to April 2013 at least, she planned to take time off to focus on her health.

Mortimer appeared at the Olympic Heroes Parade in Toronto. For the event, Paralympic athletes were given rooms at a hotel on the outskirts of Toronto while Olympic athletes were housed downtown and received gifts; at a dinner, the Paralympians were relegated to a different dining room. A Canadian Paralympic Committee spokesperson told The Spectator that the committee scrambled during the Paralympics to have their athletes included, and with their limited funding they could not afford the perks received by the Olympic athletes.

Mortimer was a 2015 Pan and Parapan American Games ambassador, and has given presentations at schools. She received honorariums for these appearances, and hoped to earn $3,000 in speaking fees in 2012. She appeared on CBC's Play On! Street Hockey Championship in Niagara Falls, assisted with the post-position draw at the Pattison Canadian International Championship Stakes, and has appeared in publicity photo shoots.

Competitive-swimwear manufacturer Arena sponsors Mortimer. In November 2012, she went public about her and her uncle's difficulty in finding sponsorship since the 2010 Worlds. Mortimer said that Paralympic athletes received no prize money, despite thousands of dollars given by the government to winning Olympians and their coaches. She told The Hamilton Spectator, "We get a pat on the back and a good job note from Stephen Harper. It's upsetting. Trust me, coming from being an able-bodied athlete to a Paralympian, it infuriates me", and that she receives $3,000 a year in funding from the government. Mortimer's return to the pool included the April 9, 2014 Cam Am Para Swimming competition, where she won three gold medals.

=== Paraswimming for the Netherlands ===
In 2013, Mortimer applied to switch to the Netherlands national team; since her mother is from that country, she has dual citizenship. In June 2014, the Hamilton Spectator reported the change. Although day-to-day funding in the Netherlands is similar to that in Canada, the former offers prize money; in the 2012 Paralympics, Mortimer would have won $60,000 for her gold medals alone. She will train in Amersfoort.

She was successful at the August 2014 IPC Swimming European Championships in Eindhoven. Breaking the women's 50-metre freestyle record in the morning's heats, Mortimer lowered it again to 28.12 in the finals. In the S10 100-metre backstroke, she broke the European record in the morning's heats and again in the final. Although she won a gold medal, she told the IPC website: "I wanted a world record. I'm not satisfied, I'm not super happy. That wasn't the perfect race. But this was a gauge to see where I am at."

=== Awards ===
The Big Splash (from Swimming Canada)

- 2011: Female Para-Swimmer of the Year; her father was the Para-Female Coach of the Year
- 2012: TAS Para-Swimming Female Swimmer of the Year

Ontario Sport Award (from Sport Alliance Ontario)

- 2011: Female Athlete with a Disability of the Year (Note: Mortimer's father was nominated for Male Coach of the Year from Ontario Sport Award, losing to Anthony McCleary, a track coach. (Moko, "Different strokes". The Hamilton Spectator.))
- 2012: Female Athlete with a Disability of the Year; her coach, Reg Chappell, was Male Coach of the Year.

Queen Elizabeth II Diamond Jubilee Medal (2012) (Note: The medal was given to Mortimer and the other Canadian athletes competing in the 2012 Olympics and 2012 Paralympics. ("Athletes returning from London Games get hero’s welcome in Parliament". The Hamilton Spectator.))

Mortimer, Melissa Tancredi and Cory Conacher were nominated for the 2013 Golden Horseshoe Athlete of the Year for residents of Hamilton or Burlington. Tancredi won. Columnist Dave Feschuk of the Toronto Star listed Mortimer as a contender for the 2012 Lou Marsh Trophy (won by Christine Sinclair).

== Arts and broadcasting career ==
In 2012, Mortimer illustrated The Night I Met the Boogie Man, written by her twin sister Julia, and created murals.

In 2012, Mortimer's work was included in the Talent Supporting Talent Canadian Athlete Art Exhibit, a fundraiser at the Jane Roos Gallery in Toronto. Her first solo art exhibition was at the Station Coffee House and Gallery in 2015.

After her swimming career, Mortimer refocused in the arts, including the visual arts and performing arts, becoming a Vocal Performance major at Mohawk College. She discovered her passion for theatre when working as a vocal coach and assistant music director for Burlington Student Theatre. In 2020, she was a cast member of Drury Lane Theatrical Productions' Little Shop of Horrors.

She was a nominee at the 2019 City of Hamilton Arts Awards, for the Emerging Media Arts Award.

Mortimer worked as a "princess performer" for entertainment company Forever Fairest.

In 2021, Mortimer was named as the pool-side reporter for aquatics competition at the Olympic Games, and studio analyst for the Paralympic Games broadcasts on CBC and AMI-tv. She returned to co-host in-studio segments with Scott Russell for the opening and closing ceremonies and daily highlights programs, during the 2022 Winter Paralympics. From 2024 to 2025, she was a host for Sportsnet.

== Personal life ==
I don’t think I look disabled. I hide it really well. Because I don’t show pain, I get a lot of criticism. I’m sorry. I’m stubborn as a mule. I’ve been through too much to show any sign of weakness.

— Mortimer to the Canadian Press in 2012

In November 2008, shortly after the Olympic trampoline trials, 15-year-old Mortimer missed the sponge pit after bouncing on a mini-trampoline and fell 15 feet (4.6 m) onto a concrete pad; her parents, spectators at the competition, saw the accident. The bones in her feet were shattered, and doctors suggested that she would never stand again. Amputation was a possibility, although Mortimer was only informed of it in 2011.

She spent six months in a wheelchair and another 18 months on crutches. Mortimer's right foot has six screws and a plate, and her left foot has two screws; her ankles are continuously sore, and occasionally lock up. During the Paralympics she told the Canadian Press that her feet were "killing" her, and her condition is degenerative. When Mortimer's casts were removed her walking rehabilitation was in the water, and she thinks she would not be able to walk without the aquatic rehab. Before the injury, she had 10 sessions per week in the pool (swimming 6–7 kilometres (3.7–4.3 mi) each session) in addition to weight training and running. After the accident her weekly threshold at the local YMCA pool was 30 to 40 kilometres (19 to 25 mi) and four sessions in the weight room. Her disability is not usually evident to spectators, and according to the Canadian Press she walks with a "halfway normal gait."

Sportsnet Magazine chose Mortimer for its 2013 "Beauty of Sport" issue, and she was photographed in Las Vegas wearing a bikini. She hoped to increase interest in paralympic sport and to celebrate the bodies of all athletes.

She is a graduate of Westmount Secondary School. She was named after Summer Sanders, an American Olympic swimmer who won four medals (two gold, one silver and one bronze) at the 1992 Summer Olympics in Barcelona, one year before she was born.
