= Swimming at the 2016 Summer Paralympics – Women's 100 metre butterfly S10 =

Women's 100 metre butterfly S10 at the XV Paralympic Games
- Venue: Olympic Aquatics Stadium
- Dates: 12 September 2016
- Competitors: 11 from 11 nations

Medalists
1st place, gold medalist(s)		Sophie Pascoe	New Zealand
2nd place, silver medalist(s)		Yi Chen	China
3rd place, bronze medalist(s)		Oliwia Jabłońska	Poland

The women's 100 metre butterfly S10 event at the 2016 Paralympic Games took place on 12 September 2016, at the Olympic Aquatics Stadium. Two heats were held. The swimmers with the eight fastest times advanced to the final.

== Heats ==
=== Heat 1 ===
10:51 12 September 2016:

Rank	Lane	Name	Nationality	Time	Notes
1	5	Oliwia Jabłońska	Poland	1:11.22	Q
2	6	Paige Leonhardt	Australia	1:11.42	Q
3	2	Chantalle Zijderveld	Netherlands	1:12.89	Q
4	4	Alice Tai	Great Britain	1:12.98	Q
5	7	Airi Ike	Japan	1:13.81	

=== Heat 2 ===
10:55 12 September 2016:

Rank	Lane	Name	Nationality	Time	Notes
1	4	Sophie Pascoe	New Zealand	1:04.37	PR Q
2	5	Yi Chen	China	1:08.62	Q
3	3	Isabel Yinghua Hernandez Santos	Spain	1:09.39	Q
4	6	Samantha Ryan	Canada	1:11.12	Q
5	2	Bianka Pap	Hungary	1:13.40	
6	7	Lina Watz	Sweden	1:14.50	

== Final ==
18:43 12 September 2016:

Rank	Lane	Name	Nationality	Time	Notes
1st place, gold medalist(s)	4	Sophie Pascoe	New Zealand	1:02.65	PR
2nd place, silver medalist(s)	5	Yi Chen	China	1:06.92	
3rd place, bronze medalist(s)	2	Oliwia Jabłońska	Poland	1:08.77	
4	3	Isabel Yinghua Hernandez Santos	Spain	1:09.23	
5	6	Samantha Ryan	Canada	1:09.73	
6	7	Paige Leonhardt	Australia	1:10.55	
7	8	Alice Tai	Great Britain	1:11.92	
8	1	Chantalle Zijderveld	Netherlands	1:13.56	
