= Swimming at the 2016 Summer Paralympics – Women's 200 metre individual medley SM10 =

Women's 200 metre individual medley SM10 at the XV Paralympic Games
- Venue: Olympic Aquatics Stadium
- Dates: 11 September 2016
- Competitors: 9 from 7 nations

Medalists
1st place, gold medalist(s)		Sophie Pascoe	New Zealand
2nd place, silver medalist(s)		Aurelie Rivard	Canada
3rd place, bronze medalist(s)		Bianka Pap	Hungary

The women's 200 metre individual medley SM10 event at the 2016 Paralympic Games took place on 11 September 2016, at the Olympic Aquatics Stadium. Two heats were held. The swimmers with the eight fastest times advanced to the final.

== Heats ==
=== Heat 1 ===
11:02 11 September 2016:

Rank	Lane	Name	Nationality	Time	Notes
1	4	Aurelie Rivard	Canada	2:33.88	Q
2	3	Lisa Kruger	Netherlands	2:34.64	Q
3	5	Bianka Pap	Hungary	2:36.78	Q
4	6	Paige Leonhardt	Australia	2:39.57	

=== Heat 2 ===
11:07 11 September 2016:

Rank	Lane	Name	Nationality	Time	Notes
1	4	Sophie Pascoe	New Zealand	2:27.44	Q
2	6	Harriet Lee	Great Britain	2:35.90	Q
3	3	Chantalle Zijderveld	Netherlands	2:36.30	Q
4	5	Meng Zhang	China	2:36.64	Q
5	2	Yi Chen	China	2:37.33	Q

== Final ==
19:07 11 September 2016:

Rank	Lane	Name	Nationality	Time	Notes
1st place, gold medalist(s)	4	Sophie Pascoe	New Zealand	2:24.90	WR
2nd place, silver medalist(s)	5	Aurelie Rivard	Canada	2:30.03	
3rd place, bronze medalist(s)	1	Bianka Pap	Hungary	2:31.46	
4	3	Lisa Kruger	Netherlands	2:32.81	
5	8	Yi Chen	China	2:33.06	
6	2	Chantalle Zijderveld	Netherlands	2:33.10	
7	6	Harriet Lee	Great Britain	2:34.91	
8	7	Meng Zhang	China	2:36.53	
