= Swimming at the 2018 Mediterranean Games – Women's 100 metre freestyle S10 =

Women's 100 metre freestyle S10 at the 2018 Mediterranean Games
- Venue: Campclar Aquatic Center
- Location: Tarragona, Spain
- Dates: 25 June
- Competitors: 7 from 4 nations
- Winning time: 1:01.96

Medalists
gold medal	Élodie Lorandi	France
silver medal	Alessia Scortechini	Italy
bronze medal	Sarai Gascón Moreno	Spain

The women's 100 metre freestyle S10 competition at the 2018 Mediterranean Games was held on 25 June 2018 at the Campclar Aquatic Center.

== Records ==
World record	Aurélie Rivard (CAN)	59.17	Toronto, Canada	14 August 2015

== Results ==
The final was held at 18:37.

Rank	Lane	Name	Nationality	Time	Notes
1st place, gold medalist(s)	4	Élodie Lorandi	France	1:01.96	
2nd place, silver medalist(s)	5	Alessia Scortechini	Italy	1:02.38	
3rd place, bronze medalist(s)	3	Sarai Gascón Moreno	Spain	1:03.09	
4	2	Anaëlle Roulet	France	1:04.04	
5	6	Nuria Marqués	Spain	1:04.47	
6	7	Xenia Palazzo	Italy	1:06.90	
7	1	Paula Novina	Croatia	1:22.36	
