= Swimming at the 2012 Summer Paralympics – Women's 100 metre butterfly S10 =

Women's 100m Butterfly S10 at the XIV Paralympic Games
- Venue: London Aquatics Centre
- Dates: 1 September
- Competitors: 10 from 10 nations
- Winning time: 1:04.43

Medalists
1st place, gold medalist(s)		Sophie Pascoe	New Zealand
2nd place, silver medalist(s)		Oliwia Jabłońska	Poland
3rd place, bronze medalist(s)		Elodie Lorandi	France

The women's 100m butterfly S10 event at the 2012 Summer Paralympics took place at the London Aquatics Centre on 1 September. There were two heats; the swimmers with the eight fastest times advanced to the final.

== Results ==
=== Heats ===
Competed from 09:41.

==== Heat 1 ====
Rank	Lane	Name	Nationality	Time	Notes
1	5	Oliwia Jabłońska	Poland	1:11.11	Q
2	6	Katherine Downie	Australia	1:11.37	Q
3	4	Elodie Lorandi	France	1:11.39	Q
4	3	Gemma Almond	Great Britain	1:14.07	Q
5	2	Brianna Jennett-McNeill	Canada	1:20.53	

==== Heat 2 ====
Rank	Lane	Name	Nationality	Time	Notes
1	4	Sophie Pascoe	New Zealand	1:04.97	Q, WR
2	6	Nina Ryabova	Russia	1:09.13	Q
3	5	Anna Eames	United States	1:11.61	Q
4	3	Isabel Yinghua Hernandez Santos	Spain	1:13.19	Q
	2	Shireen Sapiro	South Africa	DNS	

=== Final ===
Competed at 17:37.

Rank	Lane	Name	Nationality	Time	Notes
1st place, gold medalist(s)	4	Sophie Pascoe	New Zealand	1:04.43	WR
2nd place, silver medalist(s)	3	Oliwia Jabłońska	Poland	1:08.55	EU
3rd place, bronze medalist(s)	2	Elodie Lorandi	France	1:09.08	
4	5	Nina Ryabova	Russia	1:09.13	
5	6	Katherine Downie	Australia	1:10.20	
6	7	Anna Eames	United States	1:10.57	
7	1	Isabel Yinghua Hernandez Santos	Spain	1:11.97	
8	8	Gemma Almond	Great Britain	1:13.24	

'Q = qualified for final. WR = World Record. EU = European Record. DNS = Did not start.
