= Krista Mørkøre =

Faroese swimmer

Personal information
- National team: Faroe Islands

Sport
- Country: Faroe Islands
- Sport: Swimming
- Disability class: S10
- Updated on 24 November 2017

Krista Mørkøre is a Faroe Islander swimmer, who competed at the 2016 Summer Paralympics as the only member of her country's delegation.

== Career ==
In 2007, Krista Mørkøre developed a cerebral edema, causing her brain to swell. This resulted in paralysis of the right side of her face, and ataxia of her arms. She took up swimming, competing at the Danish Open competitions. She won multiple medals at the 2013 event. Mørkøre sought to qualify for the 2016 Summer Paralympics in Rio de Janeiro, Brazil. She failed to set a fast enough time, but was given a wildcard position instead.

During the opening ceremony, she was the flag bearer for the Faroe Islands during the Parade of Nations. She took part in three of the swimming events in the S10 disability category: the 50 metre freestyle, the 100 metre freestyle and the 400 metre freestyle. She did not progress out of the heats in any of her events, finishing seventh in the 50 metres, sixth in the 100 metres, and fifth in the 400 metres.

She continues to take part in the World Para Swimming World Series, qualifying for the final with a new personal best time in the 50 metres at the first event of 2017 in Copenhagen.
