= Netherlands at the 2016 Summer Paralympics =

- Flag of the Netherlands
- IPC code: NED
- NPC: Nederlands Olympisch Comité * Nederlandse Sport Federatie
- Website: paralympisch.nl (in Dutch)

in Rio de Janeiro
- Competitors: 126 in 14 sports
- Flag bearer: Marlou van Rhijn
- Medals Ranked 7th: Gold 17 Silver 19 Bronze 26 Total 62

Summer Paralympics appearances (overview)
- 1960; 1964; 1968; 1972; 1976; 1980; 1984; 1988; 1992; 1996; 2000; 2004; 2008; 2012; 2016; 2020; 2024

The Netherlands competed at the 2016 Summer Paralympics in Rio de Janeiro, Brazil, from 7 September to 18 September 2016. The first places the team qualified were for four athletes in equestrian team dressage. In September 2015, a representative from the country attended the Rio 2016 Paralympic Games Chef de Mission seminar as part of the country's preparation efforts for the 2016 Games.

== Medalists ==
The following Dutch competitors won medals at the Games. In the 'by discipline' sections below, medallists' names are in bold.

| Medal | Name | Sport | Event | Date |
|---|---|---|---|---|
| Gold | Lisa Kruger | Swimming | Women's 100m Breaststroke - SB9 | 8 September |
| Gold | Jetze Plat | Paratriathlon | Men - PT1 | 10 September |
| Gold | Alyda Norbruis | Cycling | Women's C1-2-3 500m Time Trial | 10 September |
| Gold | Liesette Bruinsma | Swimming | Women's 400m Freestyle S11 | 11 September |
| Gold | Tristan Bangma | Cycling | Men's 1000m Time Trial B | 11 September |
| Gold | Kenny van Weeghel | Athletics | Men's 400m - T54 | 12 September |
| Gold | Kelly van Zon | Table tennis | Women's singles - Class 7 | 13 September |
| Gold | Alyda Norbruis | Cycling | Women's Time Trial C1-2-3 | 14 September |
| Gold | Marlou van Rhijn | Athletics | Women's 200m - T43/44 | 15 September |
| Gold | Jiske Griffioen | Wheelchair tennis | Women's singles | 15 September |
| Gold | Sanne Voets | Equestrian | Individual Freestyle Test - Grade III | 16 September |
| Gold | Jiske Griffioen; Aniek van Koot | Wheelchair tennis | Women's doubles | 16 September |
| Gold | Vincent ter Schure | Cycling | Men's Road race - B | 17 September |
| Gold | Daniel Abraham Gerbru | Cycling | Men's Road race - C4-5 | 17 September |
| Gold | Liesette Bruinsma | Swimming | Women's 200m Individual Medley - SM11 | 17 September |
| Gold | Marlou van Rhijn | Athletics | Women's 100m - T43/44 | 18 September |
| Gold | Marc Evers | Swimming | Men's 200m Individual Medley - SM14 | 18 September |
| Silver | Vincent ter Schure | Cycling | Men's individual pursuit B | 8 September |
| Silver | Marc Evers | Swimming | Men's 100m Breaststroke - S14 | 8 September |
| Silver | Marlou van der Kulk | Swimming | Women's 100m Backstroke - S14 | 8 September |
| Silver | Larissa Klaassen | Cycling | Women's B 1000m Time Trial | 9 September |
| Silver | Geert Schipper | Paratriathlon | Men - PT1 | 10 September |
| Silver | Arnoud Nijhuis | Cycling | Men's C1-2-3 1000m Time Trial | 10 September |
| Silver | Olivier van de Voort | Swimming | Men's 100m Backstroke - S10 | 11 September |
| Silver | Gerben Last | Table tennis | Men's Singles - Class 9 | 11 September |
| Silver | Thijs van Hofweegen | Swimming | Men's 400m Freestyle - S6 | 13 September |
| Silver | Liesette Bruinsma | Swimming | Women's 100m Breaststroke - SB11 | 13 September |
| Silver | Vincent ter Schure | Cycling | Men's Time trial B | 14 September |
| Silver | Michael Schoenmaker | Swimming | Men's 200m Freestyle - S4 | 14 September |
| Silver | Aniek van Koot | Wheelchair tennis | Women's singles | 15 September |
| Silver | Laura de Vaan | Cycling | Women's Road Race H5 | 15 September |
| Silver | Demi Vermeulen | Equestrian | Individual Championship Test - Grade II | 15 September |
| Silver | Daniel Perez | Boccia | Mixed Individual - BC1 | 16 September |
| Silver | Rixt van der Horst | Equestrian | Individual Freestyle Test - Grade II | 16 September |
| Silver | Marjolein Buis; Diede de Groot | Wheelchair tennis | Women's doubles | 16 September |
| Silver | Ronald Hertog | Athletics | Men's Long Jump - T43/44 | 17 September |
| Bronze | Alyda Norbruis | Cycling | Women's individual pursuit C1-3 | 8 September |
| Bronze | Stephen de Vries | Cycling | Men's individual pursuit B | 8 September |
| Bronze | Duncan van Haaren | Swimming | Men's 100m Breaststroke SB9 | 8 September |
| Bronze | Michael Schoenmaker | Swimming | Men's 100m Freestyle S4 | 8 September |
| Bronze | Chantalle Zijderveld | Swimming | Women's 100m Breaststroke SB9 | 8 September |
| Bronze | Marlene van Gansewinkel | Athletics | Women's Long Jump - T43/44 | 9 September |
| Bronze | Arnoud Nijhuis | Cycling | Men's C1 3000m Individual Pursuit | 9 September |
| Bronze | Lisa den Braber | Swimming | Women's 100m Breaststroke - SB7 | 10 September |
| Bronze | Lisette Teunissen | Swimming | Women's 50m Backstroke - S3 | 10 September |
| Bronze | Lara Baars | Athletics | Women's Shot Put - F40 | 11 September |
| Bronze | Marlou van der Kulk | Swimming | Women's 200m Freestyle - S14 | 11 September |
| Bronze | Liesette Bruinsma | Swimming | Women's 50m Freestyle - S11 | 12 September |
| Bronze | Netherlands Equestrian Team: Nicole den Dulk; Rixt van der Horst; Demi Vermeulen; Frank Hosmar | Equestrian | Team Championship | 13 September |
| Bronze | Marc Evers | Swimming | Men's 100m Breaststroke S14 | 14 September |
| Bronze | Laura de Vaan | Cycling | Women's Time Trial H4-5 | 14 September |
| Bronze | Frank Hosmar | Equestrian | Individual Championship Test - Grade IV | 14 September |
| Bronze | Melaica Tuinfort | Powerlifting | Women's +86 kg | 14 September |
| Bronze | Magda Toeters | Swimming | Women's 100m Breaststroke - SB14 | 14 September |
| Bronze | Liesette Bruinsma | Swimming | Women's 100m Freestyle - S11 | 15 September |
| Bronze | Jennette Jansen | Cycling | Women's Road Race H5 | 15 September |
| Bronze | Rixt van der Horst | Equestrian | Individual Championship Test - Grade II | 15 September |
| Bronze | Jetze Plat | Cycling | Men's Road race - H5 | 15 September |
| Bronze | Frank Hosmar | Equestrian | Individual Freestyle Test - Grade IV | 16 September |
| Bronze | Women's wheelchair basketball team: Ilse Arts; Inge Huitzing; Lucie Houwen; Jitske Visser; Roos Oosterbaan; Sanne Timmerman; Bo Kramer; Cher Korver; Barbara van Bergen; Carina de Rooij; Mariska Beijer; Evelyn van Leeuwen | Wheelchair basketball | Women's tournament | 16 September |
| Bronze | Kenny van Weeghel | Athletics | Men's 100m - T54 | 18 September |
| Bronze | Marlou van der Kulk | Swimming | Women's 200m Individual Medley - SM14 | 18 September |

Medals by sport
| **Sport** | Gold medal | Silver medal | Bronze medal | Total |
| Cycling | 5 | 5 | 6 | 16 |
| Swimming | 4 | 6 | 11 | 21 |
| Athletics | 3 | 1 | 3 | 7 |
| Wheelchair tennis | 2 | 2 | 0 | 4 |
| Equestrian | 1 | 2 | 4 | 7 |
| Triathlon | 1 | 1 | 0 | 2 |
| Table tennis | 1 | 1 | 0 | 2 |
| Boccia | 0 | 1 | 0 | 1 |
| Powerlifting | 0 | 0 | 1 | 1 |
| Wheelchair basketball | 0 | 0 | 1 | 1 |

Medals by day
| **Day** | **Date** | 1st place, gold medalist(s) | 2nd place, silver medalist(s) | 3rd place, bronze medalist(s) | **Total** |
| 1 | September 8 | 1 | 3 | 5 | 9 |
| 2 | September 9 | 0 | 1 | 2 | 3 |
| 3 | September 10 | 2 | 2 | 2 | 6 |
| 4 | September 11 | 2 | 2 | 2 | 6 |
| 5 | September 12 | 1 | 0 | 1 | 2 |
| 6 | September 13 | 1 | 2 | 1 | 4 |
| 7 | September 14 | 1 | 2 | 5 | 8 |
| 8 | September 15 | 2 | 3 | 4 | 9 |
| 9 | September 16 | 2 | 3 | 2 | 7 |
| 10 | September 17 | 3 | 1 | 0 | 4 |
| 11 | September 18 | 2 | 0 | 2 | 4 |
| | **Total** | **17** | **19** | **26** | **62** |

== Athletics ==
The Netherlands competed in athletics at the 2016 Summer Paralympics.

Key

- Note–Ranks given for track events are within the athlete's heat only
- Q = Qualified for the next round by position in race or, in field events, by achieving the automatic qualification target
- q = Qualified for the next round as a fastest loser or, in field events, by position without achieving the qualifying target

Men
Track & road events

| Athlete | Event | Heats | | Final | |
| Athlete | Event | Time | Rank | Time | Rank |
|---|---|---|---|---|---|
| Kenny van Weeghel | 100 m T54 | 14.28 | 2 Q | 14.23 | 3rd place, bronze medalist(s) |
| Kenny van Weeghel | 400 m T54 | 46.60 | 2 Q | 46.65 | 1st place, gold medalist(s) |
| Kenny van Weeghel | 800 m T54 | 1:36.18 | 2 Q | 1:36.01 | 7 |
| Ronald Hertog | 100 m T44 | 11.46 | 7 | Did not advance | |

Field events

| Athlete | Event | Result | Rank |
|---|---|---|---|
| Ronald Hertog | T44 Long jump | 7.29 | 2nd place, silver medalist(s) |

Women
Track & road events

| Athlete | Event | Heats | | Final | |
| Athlete | Event | Time | Rank | Time | Rank |
|---|---|---|---|---|---|
| Marlou van Rhijn | 100 m T44 | 13.31 | 4 Q | 13.02 | 1st place, gold medalist(s) |
| Marlou van Rhijn | 200 m T44 | 26.69 | 1 Q | 26.16 | 1st place, gold medalist(s) |
| Margriet van den Broek | 400 m T54 | 56.78 | 4 q | 57.37 | 8 |
| Margriet van den Broek | 800 m T54 | 1:49.69 | 5 q | 1:52.01 | 8 |
| Amy Siemons | 100 m T34 | - | - | 18.82 | 4 |
| Marlene van Gansewinkel | 100 m T44 | 13.38 | 2 Q | 13.64 | 7 |
| Desiree Vranken | 800 m T34 | - | - | | DSQ |

Field events

| Athlete | Event | Result | Rank |
|---|---|---|---|
| Lara Baars | Shot put F40 | 7.12 | 3rd place, bronze medalist(s) |
| Lara Baars | Discus F41 | 19.01 | 10 |
| Marlene van Gansewinkel | T44 Long Jump | 5.57 | 3rd place, bronze medalist(s) |
| Ingrid Van Kranen | Discus F11 | 25.57 | 9 |

== Equestrian ==
The Netherlands were one of three nations to qualify a team for dressage via their results at the 2014 FEI World Equestrian Games, where they won the silver medal in the team event.

Individual

| Athlete | Horse | Event | Score | Rank |
|---|---|---|---|---|
| Frank Hosmar | Alphaville | Championship test grade IV | 72.452 | 3rd place, bronze medalist(s) |
| Frank Hosmar | Alphaville | Freestyle test grade IV | | |
| Nicole den Dulk | Wallace | Championship test grade Ib | 71.103 | 4 |
| Nicole den Dulk | Wallace | Freestyle test grade Ib | | |
| Rixt van der Horst | Caraat | Championship test grade II | 71.353 | 4 |
| Rixt van der Horst | Caraat | Freestyle test grade II | | |
| Demi Vermeulen | Burberry | Championship test grade II | 71.824 | 2nd place, silver medalist(s) |
| Demi Vermeulen | Burberry | Freestyle test grade II | | |
| 'Sanne Voets | Demantur | Championship test grade III | 70.316 | 2nd place, silver medalist(s) |
| 'Sanne Voets | Demantur | Freestyle test grade III | | |

Team

| Athlete | Horse | Event | Test round | | Final round | | Total | |
| Athlete | Horse | Event | Score | Rank | Score | Rank | Score | Rank |
|---|---|---|---|---|---|---|---|---|
| Frank Hosmar | See above | Team | 72.381 | | 72.452 | | 430.353 | 3rd place, bronze medalist(s) |
| Nicole den Dulk | See above | Team | 70.64 | | 71.103 | | 430.353 | 3rd place, bronze medalist(s) |
| Rixt van der Horst | See above | Team | 71.353 | | 70.743 | | 430.353 | 3rd place, bronze medalist(s) |
| Demi Vermeulen | See above | Team | 71.824 | | 71.600 | | 430.353 | 3rd place, bronze medalist(s) |

== Football 7-a-side football ==
=== Men's tournament ===
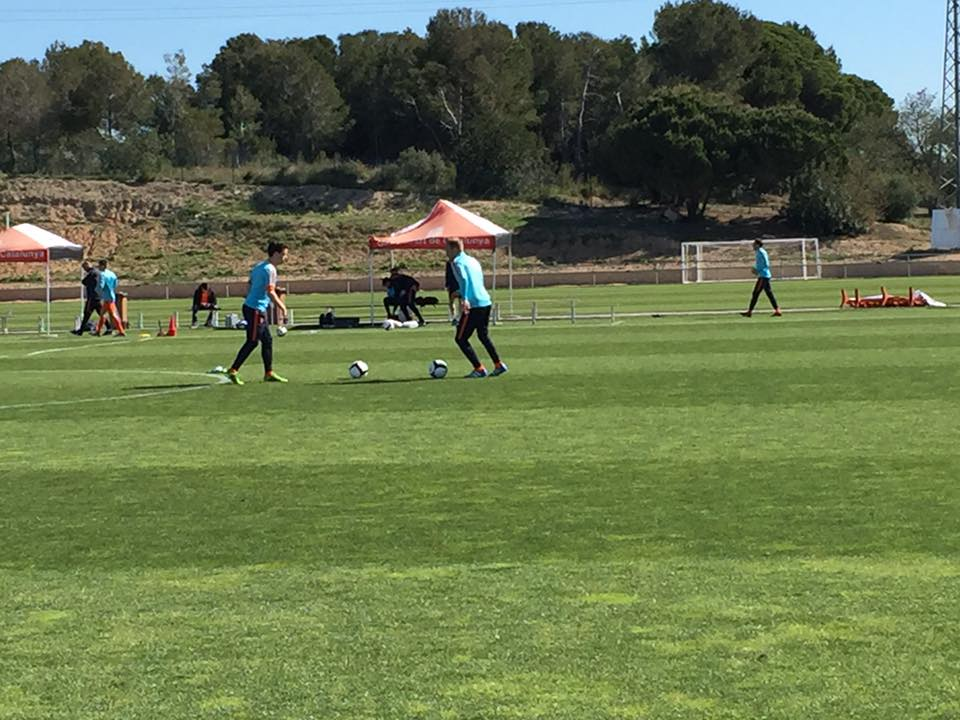
Dutch players warm up for a game at IFCPF Pre Paralympic Tournament Salou 2016, the last major preparation event for the Rio Games.

Netherlands national 7-a-side football team qualified for the Rio Paralympics as a result of the Regional Qualifier Allocation by virtue of being runners-up at 2014 European Championships while being ranked in the top 8 at the 2015 World Championships.

The draw for the tournament was held on May 6 at the 2016 Pre Paralympic Tournament in Salou, Spain. The Netherlands was put into Group B with the United States, Argentina and Russia. Iran qualified for the 2016 Rio Games following the suspension of Russia. The IPC ruled that there could not be a redraw for the groups. This resulted in Iran being put into Group A with the Netherlands, Argentina and the United States.

The tournament where the Paralympic draw took place featured 7 of the 8 teams participating in Rio. It was the last major preparation event ahead of the Rio Games for all teams participating. The Netherlands finished third, after winning 2 - 3 against Great Britain in the 3rd place match.

Going into the Rio Games, the country was ranked fourth in the world.

Group B

| Pos | Team | Pld | W | D | L | GF | GA | GD | Pts | Qualification |
|---|---|---|---|---|---|---|---|---|---|---|
| 1 | Iran | 3 | 3 | 0 | 0 | 7 | 1 | +6 | 9 | Semi finals |
| 2 | Netherlands | 3 | 1 | 1 | 1 | 4 | 4 | 0 | 4 | Semi finals |
| 3 | Argentina | 3 | 1 | 0 | 2 | 4 | 7 | −3 | 3 | 5th–6th place match |
| 4 | United States | 3 | 0 | 1 | 2 | 4 | 7 | −3 | 1 | 7th–8th place match |

Source: Paralympic.org
8 September 2016
19:00

| Netherlands | 2–2 | United States |
|---|---|---|
| Saedt 44'; Kleinlugtebeld 57' | Report | Ballou 3', 60' |

Deodoro Stadium, Rio de Janeiro
Attendance: 2,223
Referee: Ross Haswell (Great Britain)

10 September 2016
14:00

| Argentina | 0–2 | Netherlands |
|---|---|---|
| | Report | Kleinlugtebeld 49'; Visker 60+1' |

Deodoro Stadium, Rio de Janeiro
Attendance: 10,300
Referee: Raphael Torres (Brazil)

12 September 2016
10:00

| Iran | 2–0 | Netherlands |
|---|---|---|
| Rastegarimobin 9'; Mehri 18' | Report |

Deodoro Stadium, Rio de Janeiro
Attendance: 2,222
Referee: Skye Arthur-Banning (Canada)

Semi-final

14 September 2016
10:00

| Ukraine | 4–0 | Netherlands |
|---|---|---|
| Antonyuk 9', 44', 60+2'; Len 30+1' | Report |

Deodoro Stadium, Rio de Janeiro
Attendance: 2,010
Referee: Hector Robas Bondia (Spain)

Bronze medal game

16 September 2016
14:00

| Netherlands | 1–3 | Brazil |
|---|---|---|
| Schuitert 54' | Report | Leandrinho 1', 49', 56' |

Deodoro Stadium, Rio de Janeiro
Attendance: 6,737
Referee: Jorge Barbisan (Argentina)

== Powerlifting ==
The Netherlands had qualified one powerlifter into the Paralympic tournaments for the first time since the 2000 Summer Paralympics.

Women

| Athlete | Event | Total lifted | Rank |
|---|---|---|---|
| Melaica Tuinfort | Women's +86 kg | 130.0 | 3rd place, bronze medalist(s) |

== Rowing ==
The Netherlands had qualified three rowers into the Paralympic tournaments.

Men

| Athlete | Event | Heats | | Repechage | | Final | |
| Athlete | Event | Time | Rank | Time | Rank | Time | Rank |
|---|---|---|---|---|---|---|---|
| Alexander van Holk | Men's singles sculls | 5:07.20 | 5 | 5:07.87 | 6 | 5:04.94 | 7 |

Mixed

| Athlete | Event | Heats | | Repechage | | Final | |
| Athlete | Event | Time | Rank | Time | Rank | Time | Rank |
|---|---|---|---|---|---|---|---|
| Corné de Koning; Esther van der Loos | Mixed double sculls | 4:03.07 | 2 | 4:07.70 | 2 | 4:03.07 | 4 |

== Sailing ==
The Netherlands qualified two sailers into the Paralympic Tournament. In the SKUD 18 event, the Netherlands earned a quota spot with a fourth-place finish overall and the first country who had not qualified via the 2014 Championships. The boat was crewed by Rolf Schrama and Sandra Nap.

| Athlete | Event | Race | | | | | | | | | | | Net points | Rank |
| Athlete | Event | 1 | 2 | 3 | 4 | 5 | 6 | 7 | 8 | 9 | 10 | 11 | Net points | Rank |
|---|---|---|---|---|---|---|---|---|---|---|---|---|---|---|
| Rolf Schrama, Sandra Nap | Mixed SKUD 18 | -8 | 7 | 8 | 8 | 5 | 4 | 7 | 7 | 6 | 8 | 8 | 76 | 68 |

== Sitting volleyball ==
=== Women ===
Group A

| Pos | Team | Pld | W | L | Pts | SW | SL | SR | SPW | SPL | SPR | Qualification |
|---|---|---|---|---|---|---|---|---|---|---|---|---|
| 1 | Brazil (H) | 3 | 3 | 0 | 6 | 9 | 0 | MAX | 225 | 140 | 1.607 | Semi-finals |
| 2 | Ukraine | 3 | 2 | 1 | 5 | 6 | 5 | 1.200 | 237 | 229 | 1.035 | Semi-finals |
| 3 | Netherlands | 3 | 1 | 2 | 4 | 5 | 7 | 0.714 | 250 | 265 | 0.943 | Classification 5th / 6th |
| 4 | Canada | 3 | 0 | 3 | 3 | 1 | 9 | 0.111 | 169 | 247 | 0.684 | Classification 7th / 8th |

Source: Paralympic.org
(H) Host

| 9 September 2016; 20:30 | Ukraine | 3–2 | Netherlands | Riocentro - Pavilion 6, Rio de Janeiro |
| 9 September 2016; 20:30 | (21–25, 22–25, 25–13, 26–24, 15–12); Report | | | Riocentro - Pavilion 6, Rio de Janeiro |

| 11 September 2016; 14:00 | Canada | 1–3 | Netherlands | Riocentro - Pavilion 6, Rio de Janeiro |
| 11 September 2016; 14:00 | (25–22, 17–25, 17–25, 22–25); Report | | | Riocentro - Pavilion 6, Rio de Janeiro |

| 13 September 2016; 10:00 | Netherlands | 0–3 | Brazil | Riocentro - Pavilion 6, Rio de Janeiro |
| 13 September 2016; 10:00 | (18–25, 15–25, 21–25); Report | | | Riocentro - Pavilion 6, Rio de Janeiro |

Classification 5th / 6th

| 15 September 2016; 15:30 | Netherlands | 2–3 | Iran | Riocentro - Pavilion 6, Rio de Janeiro |
| 15 September 2016; 15:30 | (21–25, 23–25, 25–23, 25–15, 15–13); Report | | | Riocentro - Pavilion 6, Rio de Janeiro |

== Swimming ==
The Netherlands had qualified nineteen swimmers into the Paralympic tournaments.

Men

| Athlete | Event | Heats | | Final | |
| Athlete | Event | Time | Rank | Time | Rank |
|---|---|---|---|---|---|
| Simon Boer | SB7 100 m breaststroke | 1:20.43 | 3 Q | 1:20.44 | 4 |
| Marc Evers | S14 100 m backstroke | 1:00.97 | 2 Q | 1:00.63 | 2nd place, silver medalist(s) |
| Marc Evers | SB14 100 m breaststroke | 1:07.67 | 3 Q | 1:07.64 | 3rd place, bronze medalist(s) |
| Marc Evers | SM14 200 m medley | 2:12.07 PR | 1 Q | 2:10.29 PR | 1st place, gold medalist(s) |
| Duncan van Haaren | SB9 100 m breaststroke | 1:07.33 | 2 Q | 1:06.54 | 3rd place, bronze medalist(s) |
| Thijs van Hofweegen | S6 50 m freestyle | 31.81 | 7 Q | 31.27 | 8 |
| Thijs van Hofweegen | S6 100 m freestyle | 1:08.48 | 3 Q | 1:08.05 | 5 |
| Michael Schoenmaker | S4 100 m freestyle | 1:28.96 | 5 Q | 1:26.87 | 3rd place, bronze medalist(s) |
| Michael Schoenmaker | S4 200 m freestyle | 3:05.13 | 3 Q | 3:03.81 | 2nd place, silver medalist(s) |
| Bas Takken | S10 400 m freestyle | 4:08.60 | 2 Q | 4:05.46 | 4 |
| Olivier van de Voort | S10 100 m freestyle | 54.77 | 7 Q | 55.04 | 8 |
| Olivier van de Voort | S10 400 m freestyle | 4:17.22 | 9 | did not advance | |
| Olivier van de Voort | S10 100 m backstroke | 58.53 | 2 Q | 58.10 | 2nd place, silver medalist(s) |
| Olivier van de Voort | SM10 200 m medley | 2:13.98 | 4 Q | 2:13.72 | 5 |

Women

| Athlete | Event | Heats | | Final | |
| Athlete | Event | Time | Rank | Time | Rank |
|---|---|---|---|---|---|
| Lisa den Braber | SB7 100 m breaststroke | 1:34.13 | 2 Q | 1:34.66 | 3rd place, bronze medalist(s) |
| Lisa den Braber | SM8 200 m medley | 3:05.12 | 9 | did not advance | |
| Liesette Bruinsma | S11 50 m freestyle | 31.81 | 5 Q | 31.23 | 3rd place, bronze medalist(s) |
| Liesette Bruinsma | S11 100 m freestyle | 1:08.97 | 1 Q | 1:08.55 | 3rd place, bronze medalist(s) |
| Liesette Bruinsma | SB11 100 m breaststroke | —N/a | | 1:25.81 | 2nd place, silver medalist(s) |
| Sanne Hofman | S13 100 m backstroke | 1:15.00 | 6 Q | 1:14.70 | 6 |
| Lisa Kruger | S10 100 m freestyle | 1.02.73 | 4Q | 1:02.67 | 5 |
| Lisa Kruger | S10 100 m backstroke | 1.10.56 | 5Q | 1.10.59 | 5 |
| Lisa Kruger | SB9 100 m breaststroke | 1:15.47 WR | 1 Q | 1.15.49 | 1st place, gold medalist(s) |
| Lisa Kruger | SM10 200 m medley | 2.34.64 | 3Q | 2.32.81 | 4 |
| Marlou van der Kulk | S14 200 m freestyle | 2:14.63 | 4 Q | 2:10.20 | 3rd place, bronze medalist(s) |
| Marlou van der Kulk | S14 100 m backstroke | 1:07.23 | 2 Q | 1:06.33 | 2nd place, silver medalist(s) |
| Marlou van der Kulk | SB14 100 m breaststroke | 1:19.75 | 4 Q | 1:20.15 | 4 |
| Marlou van der Kulk | SM14 200 m medley | 2:31.41 | 3 Q | 2:29.49 | 3rd place, bronze medalist(s) |
| Chantal Molenkamp | S10 50 m freestyle | 28.99 | 6 Q | 28.93 | 6 |
| Marije Oosterhuis | S10 50 m freestyle | 29.39 | 10 | did not advance | |
| Marije Oosterhuis | S10 100 m freestyle | 1:03.16 | 7 Q | 1:02.78 | 7 |
| Marije Oosterhuis | S10 400 m freestyle | 4:48.71 | 7 Q | 4:48.13 | 7 |
| Marije Oosterhuis | S10 100 m backstroke | 1:12.41 | 8 Q | 1:13.07 | 8 |
| Lisette Teunissen | S4 50 m freestyle | 48.16 | 8 Q | 45.56 | 7 |
| Lisette Teunissen | S3 100 m freestyle | 1:41.82 | 4 Q | 1:39.77 | 4 |
| Lisette Teunissen | S3 50 m backstroke | 54.34 | 3 Q | 53.44 | 3rd place, bronze medalist(s) |
| Magda Toeters | SB14 100 m breaststroke | 1:17.83 | 2 Q | 1:17.35 | 3rd place, bronze medalist(s) |
| Magda Toeters | SM14 200 m medley | 2:38.40 | 7 Q | 2:36.56 | 6 |
| Manon Vermarien | S9 400 m freestyle | 4:53.26 | 3 Q | 4:53.42 | 4 |
| Chantalle Zijderveld | S10 50 m freestyle | 29.06 | 8 Q | 28.26 | 4 |
| Chantalle Zijderveld | S10 100 m freestyle | 1:03.84 | 9 | did not advance | |
| Chantalle Zijderveld | SB9 100 m breaststroke | 1:17.38 | 2 Q | 1:17.01 | 3rd place, bronze medalist(s) |
| Chantalle Zijderveld | SM10 200 m medley | 2:36.30 | 5 Q | 2:32.81 | 4 |
| Lisa Kruger; Lisa den Braber; Cléo Keijzer; Manon Vermarien | 4 × 100 m medley relay 34 points | —N/a | | 5:13.32 | 6 |

== Table tennis ==
The Netherlands had qualified four table tennis players into the Paralympic tournaments.

Men

| Athlete | Event | Preliminaries | | | Round of 16 | Quarterfinals | Semifinals | Final |
| Athlete | Event | Opposition Result | Opposition Result | Rank | Opposition Result | Opposition Result | Opposition Result | Rank |
|---|---|---|---|---|---|---|---|---|
| Bas Hergelink | C10 Men's singles | Jacobs (INA); L 0-3 | Daybell (GBR); L 2-3 | 3 | did not advance | | | |
| Gerben Last | C9 Men's singles | | | | | | | |
| Jean-Paul Montanus | C7 Men's singles | | | | | | | |
| Bas Hergelink; Gerben Last | C9–10 Men's doubles | | | | | | | |

Women

| Athlete | Event | Preliminaries | | | | Quarterfinals | Semifinals | Final | |
| Athlete | Event | Opposition Result | Opposition Result | Opposition Result | Rank | Opposition Result | Opposition Result | Opposition Result | Rank |
|---|---|---|---|---|---|---|---|---|---|
| Kelly van Zon | C7 Women's singles | Korkut (TUR); W 3-1 | Munoz (ARG); W 3-1 | Mahmoud (EGY); W 3-0 | 1 Q | —N/a | Chan (CAN); W 3-0 | Korkut (TUR); W 3-0 | 1st place, gold medalist(s) |

== Wheelchair basketball ==
=== Men's tournament ===
The Netherlands men's national wheelchair basketball team had qualified for the 2016 Rio Paralympics.

During the draw, Brazil chose of which group they wanted to be in. They were partnered with Spain, who were in the group Brazil did not select. Brazil chose Group B, which included Iran, the United States, Great Britain, Germany and Algeria. That left Spain in Group A with Australia, Canada, Turkey, the Netherlands and Japan.

Group A

| Pos | Team | Pld | W | L | PF | PA | PD | Pts | Qualification |
|---|---|---|---|---|---|---|---|---|---|
| 1 | Spain | 5 | 4 | 1 | 341 | 265 | +76 | 9 (Note: Head-to-head record: Spain 3 pts, +8 PD; Turkey 3 pts, +1 PD; Japan 3 pts, −9 PD) | Quarter-finals |
| 2 | Turkey | 5 | 4 | 1 | 327 | 272 | +55 | 9 | Quarter-finals |
| 3 | Australia | 5 | 4 | 1 | 342 | 293 | +49 | 9 | Quarter-finals |
| 4 | Netherlands | 5 | 2 | 3 | 264 | 294 | −30 | 7 | Quarter-finals |
| 5 | Japan | 5 | 1 | 4 | 278 | 300 | −22 | 6 | 9th/10th place playoff |
| 6 | Canada | 5 | 0 | 5 | 222 | 350 | −128 | 5 | 11th/12th place playoff |

Source: Paralympic.org
Rules for classification: 1) Points; 2) Head-to-head results; 3) Points difference; 4) Points scored.
Notes:

8 September 2016
18:00

Report

| Netherlands | 50–70 | Australia |
Scoring by quarter: 6–16, 19–21, 13–18, 12–15
| Pts: Korkmaz 24; Rebs: Poggenwisch 9 Asts: Korkmaz, Poggenwish 8 | | Pts: Blair 23; Rebs: Knowles 12; Asts: Stibners 7 |

Rio Olympic Arena, Rio de Janeiro
Referees: Bill Kuerzi

9 September 2016
18:00

Report

| Canada | 32–49 | Netherlands |
Scoring by quarter: 10–9, 9–6, 4–18, 9–16
| Pts: Goncin 12; Rebs: Goncin 14; Asts: Goncin, Hedges 3 | | Pts: Korkmaz 20; Rebs: Groen 7 Asts: Poggenwisch 6 |

Carioca Arena 1, Rio de Janeiro
Referees: Mati Quintana

10 September 2016
21:00

Report

| Netherlands | 67–39 | Japan |
Scoring by quarter: 22–10, 14–23, 16–16, 15–10
| Pts: Korkmaz 33; Rebs: Poggenwisch, Bellers 6 Asts: Poggenwisch 8 | | Pts: Fujimoto 25; Rebs: Fujimoto 11; Asts: Kozai 11 |

Rio Olympic Arena, Rio de Janeiro
Referees: Jaime Oseguera

11 September 2016
11:45

Report

| Turkey | 67–50 | Netherlands |
Scoring by quarter: 21–15, 16–8, 12–8, 18–10
| Pts: Dalay, Gümüş 18; Rebs: Gümüş 7 Asts: Gürbulak 11 | | Pts: Korkmaz 12; Rebs: Poggenwisch 8 Asts: Poggenwisch 10 |

Carioca Arena 1, Rio de Janeiro
Referees: Bill Kuerzi

12 September 2016
17:15

Report

| Netherlands | 48–66 | Spain |
Scoring by quarter: 12–24, 9–23, 9–8, 18–11
| Pts: Korkmaz 13; Rebs: Poggenwisch 8 Asts: Poggenwisch 4 | | Pts: A. Zarzuela 19; Rebs: three players 7 Asts: García 10 |

Rio Olympic Arena, Rio de Janeiro
Referees: Carsten Rehling

Quarterfinal

14 September 2016
15:15

Report

| United States | 70–37 | Netherlands |
Scoring by quarter: 12–18, 15–2, 24–4, 19–13
| Pts: Serio 18; Rebs: Turek 9 Asts: Serio 11 | | Pts: Korkmaz 17; Rebs: Poggenwisch 9 Asts: Peggenwisch 3 |

Rio Olympic Arena, Rio de Janeiro
Referees: Juan Urunuela

7th/8th place playoff

17 September 2016
9:30

Report

| Germany | 50–61 | Netherlands |
Scoring by quarter: 15–11, 13–21, 11–17, 11–12
| Pts: Bienek 17; Rebs: Halousski 10; Asts: Bienek 7 | | Pts: Bellers, Kormaz 19; Rebs: Groen 15; Asts: Poggenwisch 15 |

Rio Olympic Arena, Rio de Janeiro
Referees: Gustavo Mathias

=== Women's tournament ===
The Netherlands women's national wheelchair basketball team had qualified for the 2016 Rio Paralympics.

As hosts, Brazil chose which group they were put into. They were partnered with Algeria, who were put in the group they did not choose. Brazil chose Group A, which included Canada, Germany, Great Britain and Argentina. Algeria ended up in Group B with the United States, the Netherlands, France and China.

Group B

| Pos | Team | Pld | W | L | PF | PA | PD | Pts | Qualification |
|---|---|---|---|---|---|---|---|---|---|
| 1 | United States | 4 | 4 | 0 | 288 | 138 | +150 | 8 | Quarter-finals |
| 2 | Netherlands | 4 | 3 | 1 | 300 | 148 | +152 | 7 | Quarter-finals |
| 3 | China | 4 | 2 | 2 | 212 | 187 | +25 | 6 | Quarter-finals |
| 4 | France | 4 | 1 | 3 | 178 | 266 | −88 | 5 | Quarter-finals |
| 5 | Algeria | 4 | 0 | 4 | 93 | 332 | −239 | 4 | 9th/10th place playoff |

Source: Paralympic.org
Rules for classification: 1) Points; 2) Head-to-head results; 3) Points difference; 4) Points scored.

9 September 2016
17:30

Report

| Netherlands | 107–29 | Algeria |
Scoring by quarter: 34–10, 27–2, 24–8, 22–9
| Pts: Beijer 20; Rebs: van Leeuwen 10; Asts: Huitzing 12 | | Pts: Khemcani 9 Rebs: Khemcani 6 Asts: Khemcani 3 |

Rio Olympic Arena, Rio de Janeiro
Referees: Karen Molina

10 September 2016
12:15

Report

| France | 30–81 | Netherlands |
Scoring by quarter: 6–24, 4–16, 6–24, 14–17
| Pts: Saint Omer Delepine 8 Rebs: Saint Omer Delepine 5 Asts: Pichon, Watine 3 | | Pts: Beijer 16; Rebs: Korver 9 Asts: Huitzing 6 |

Carioca Arena 1, Rio de Janeiro
Referees: Carsten Rehling

11 September 2016
15:45

Report

| Netherlands | 50–60 | United States |
Scoring by quarter: 9–18, 12–13, 13–10, 16–19
| Pts: Beijer 30; Rebs: Beijer 12; Asts: Huitzing 8 | | Pts: Hollermann 17; Rebs: Hollermann 17; Asts: Murray 7 |

Carioca Arena 1, Rio de Janeiro
Referees: Krunoslav Peic

12 September 2016
11:15

Report

| China | 29–62 | Netherlands |
Scoring by quarter: 13–14, 3–17, 3–15, 10–16
| Pts: Lei, Lin 6 Rebs: Chen, Lyu 5 Asts: Long, Lin 4 | | Pts: Huitzing 22; Rebs: Beijer 8 Asts: Korver 4 |

Carioca Arena 1, Rio de Janeiro
Referees: Juan Uruneula

Quarterfinal

13 September 2016
11:45

Report

| Netherlands | 78–60 | Canada |
Scoring by quarter: 19–18, 23–11, 18–20, 18–11
| Pts: Beijer 31; Rebs: Beijer 14; Asts: Huitzing 7 | | Pts: Ouellet 20; Rebs: McLachlan 11; Asts: Ouellet, McLachlan 5 |

Rio Olympic Arena, Rio de Janeiro
Referees: Gustavo Mathias

Semi-final

15 September 2016
15:15

Report

| Germany | 55–45 | Netherlands |
Scoring by quarter: 14–4, 11–8, 7–15, 23–18
| Pts: Miller 25; Rebs: Miller, Mohnen 12; Asts: Mohnen 7 | | Pts: Visser 10; Rebs: Beijer 13; Asts: Huitzing 4 |

Rio Olympic Arena, Rio de Janeiro
Referees: Juan Urunuela

Bronze medal game

16 September 2016
11:45

Report

| Netherlands | 76–34 | Great Britain |
Scoring by quarter: 17–4, 16–13, 19–11, 24–6
| Pts: Beijer 21; Rebs: Beijer 6 Asts: Huitzing 7 | | Pts: Freeman 7 Rebs: Conroy 5 Asts: Freeman 7 |

Rio Olympic Arena, Rio de Janeiro
Referees: Carsten Rehling

== Wheelchair tennis ==
The Netherlands qualified two competitors in the men's single event and four in the women's singles event.

Singles

| Athlete (seed) | Event | Round of 64 | Round of 32 | Round of 16 | Quarterfinals | Semifinals | Final / BM | |
| Athlete (seed) | Event | Opposition Score | Opposition Score | Opposition Score | Opposition Score | Opposition Score | Opposition Score | Rank |
|---|---|---|---|---|---|---|---|---|
| Maikel Scheffers (8) | Men's singles | Bye | Kruszelnicki (POL); W 2–0 | Miki (POL); L 1–2 | did not advance | | | |
| Tom Egberink (11) | Men's singles | Bye | Dong (CHN); L 0–2 | did not advance | | | | |
| Jiske Griffioen | Women's singles | —N/a | Verfuerth (USA); W 2–0 | Shuker (GBR); W 2–0 | Huang (CHN); W 2–0 | de Groot (NED); W 2–1 | van Koot (NED); W 2–1 | 1st place, gold medalist(s) |
| Aniek van Koot | Women's singles | —N/a | Khanthasit (THA); W 2–0 | Mathewson (USA); W 2–0 | Zhu (CHN); W 2–1 | Kamiji (JPN); W 2–1 | Griffioen (NED); L 1–2 | 2nd place, silver medalist(s) |
| Diede De Groot | Women's singles | —N/a | Domori (JPN); W 2–0 | Baron (USA); W 2–0 | Whiley (GBR); W 2–0 | Griffioen (NED); L 1–2 | Kamiji (JPN); L 0–2 | 4 |
| Marjolein Buis | Women's singles | —N/a | Bernal (COL); W 2–0 | Famin (FRA); W 2–0 | Kamiji (JPN); L 0–2 | did not advance | | |

Doubles

| Athlete (seed) | Event | Round of 16 | Quarterfinals | Semifinals | Final / BM | |
| Athlete (seed) | Event | Opposition Score | Opposition Score | Opposition Score | Opposition Score | Rank |
|---|---|---|---|---|---|---|
| Jiske Griffioen; Aniek van Koot | Women's doubles | Bye | Baron; Kaiser (USA); W 2–0 | Shuker; Whiley (GBR); W 2–0 | Buis de Groot (NED); W 2–0 | 1st place, gold medalist(s) |
| Marjolein Buis; Diede de Groot | Women's doubles | Bye | Mathewson; Verfuerth (USA); W 2–0 | Kamiji; Nijo (JPN); W 2–1 | Griffioen van Koot (NED); L 0–2 | 2nd place, silver medalist(s) |

== See also ==
- Netherlands at the 2016 Summer Olympics
