= Mustafa Korkmaz =

Turkish descent Dutch wheelchair basketball player

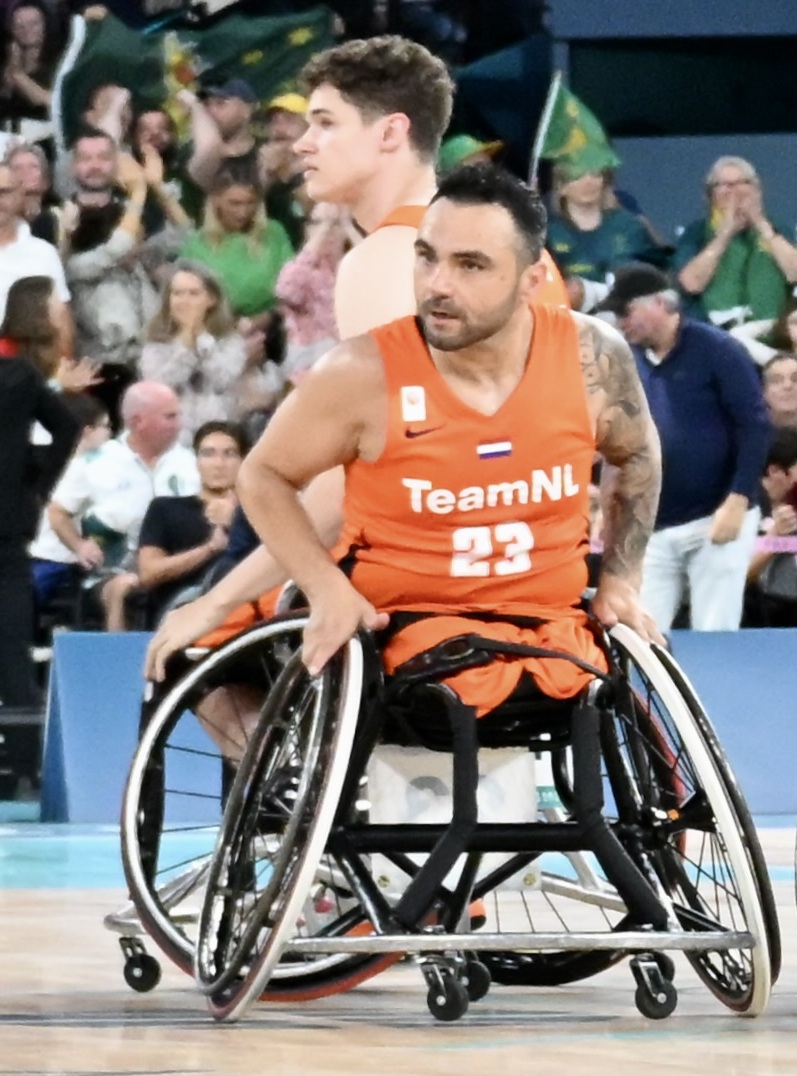

Personal information
- Born: 18 January 1988 (age 38) Bremen, Germany

Career history
- wheelchair basketball: Galatasaray S.K.

Mustafa Korkmaz (18 January 1988) is a Turkish descent Dutch wheelchair basketball player and Paralympian. He competes for the Netherlands men's national wheelchair basketball team at the 2016 Summer Paralympics in Rio de Janeiro, Brazil.

He played in the 2012–13 season of the Turkish Wheelchair Basketball Super League for Galatasaray SK wheelchair basketball team in Istanbul, Turkey.
