= Chen Yi (swimmer) =

Chinese Paralympic swimmer

Personal information
- Nationality: Chinese
- Born: February 10, 2001 (age 25)

Sport
- Sport: Swimming
Medal record
Representing China
Women's Paralympic swimming
Summer Paralympics
Gold medal – first place	2016 Rio de Janeiro	Mixed 4x50m freestyle relay-20 Points
Gold medal – first place	2024 Paris	50 m freestyle S10
Silver medal – second place	2016 Rio de Janeiro	100m butterfly S10
Bronze medal – third place	2016 Rio de Janeiro	50m freestyle S10
Bronze medal – third place	2016 Rio de Janeiro	4x100m freestyle relay 34 Points
Asian Para Games
Gold medal – first place	2022 Hangzhou	50m freestyle S10
Silver medal – second place	2022 Hangzhou	100m breaststroke SB9
Silver medal – second place	2022 Hangzhou	200m ind. medley SM10

Chen Yi (born February 10, 2001) is a Chinese swimmer.

== Career ==
She won a gold medal at the Mixed 4x50meter freestyle relay-20 Points event at the 2016 Summer Paralympics, where she swam in the heats (with a time of 28.91) but not in the final race, where the team won with 2:18.03. She also won a silver medal at the Women's 100 metre Butterfly S10 event with 1:06.92 a bronze medal at the Women's 50m Freestyle S10 event with 28.21 and another bronze medal at the Women's 4 × 100 m Freestyle Relay - 34 Points event with a personal time of 1:02.16 and a total team time of 4:24.22.
