= Élodie Lorandi =

French Paralympic swimmer and rower

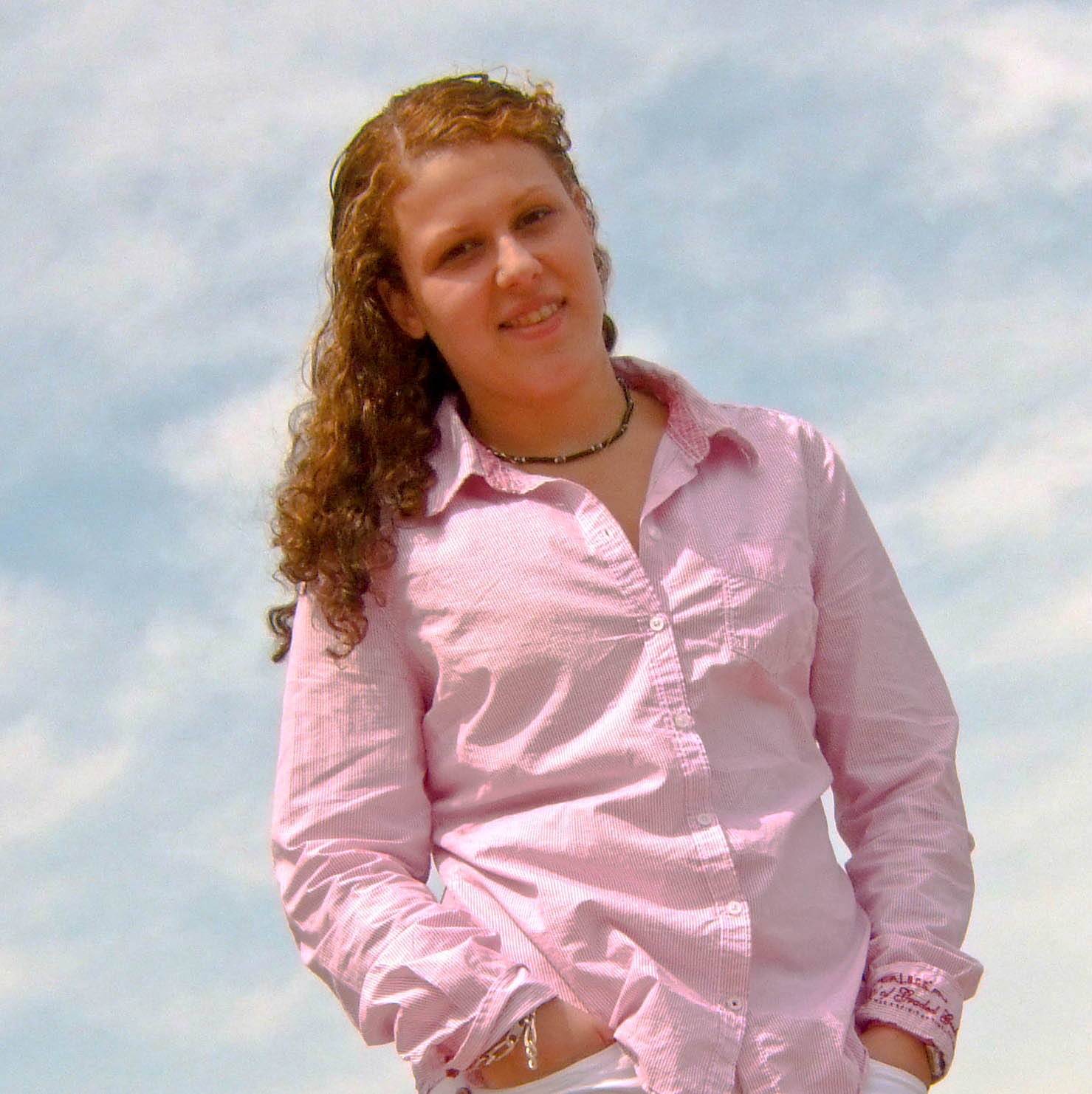
- Lorandi in 2008

Personal information
- Born: 31 May 1989 (age 37) Cannes, France

Sport
- Club: Handisport Antibes Méditerranée
- Coached by: Régis Gautier
Medal record
Representing France
Women's para swimming (S10)
Paralympic Games
Gold medal – first place	2012 London	400 m freestyle S10
Silver medal – second place	2008 Beijing	200 m ind. medley SM10
Silver medal – second place	2012 London	100 m freestyle S10
Bronze medal – third place	2012 London	50 m freestyle S10
Bronze medal – third place	2012 London	100 m butterfly S10
Bronze medal – third place	2016 Rio	100 m freestyle S10
Bronze medal – third place	2016 Rio	400 m freestyle S10
World Championships
Gold medal – first place	2013 Montreal	400 m freestyle S10
Silver medal – second place	2010 Eindhoven	100 m butterfly S10
Silver medal – second place	2010 Eindhoven	5 km open water S1-10
Silver medal – second place	2013 Montreal	50 m freestyle S10
Silver medal – second place	2015 Glasgow	400 m freestyle S10
Bronze medal – third place	2010 Eindhoven	50 m freestyle S10
Bronze medal – third place	2010 Eindhoven	100 m freestyle S10
Bronze medal – third place	2010 Eindhoven	200 m ind. medley SM10
Bronze medal – third place	2013 Montreal	100 m butterfly S10
European Championships
Gold medal – first place	2009 Reykjavik	100 m butterfly S10
Gold medal – first place	2009 Reykjavik	200 m ind. medley SM10
Gold medal – first place	2014 Eindhoven	100 m butterfly S10
Gold medal – first place	2014 Eindhoven	400 m freestyle S10
Gold medal – first place	2016 Funchal	400 m freestyle S10
Silver medal – second place	2009 Reykjavik	50 m freestyle S10
Silver medal – second place	2009 Reykjavik	100 m freestyle S10
Silver medal – second place	2016 Funchal	50 m freestyle S10
Silver medal – second place	2016 Funchal	100 m freestyle S10
Silver medal – second place	2018 Dublin	100 m freestyle S10
Bronze medal – third place	2009 Reykjavik	100 m backstroke S10
Bronze medal – third place	2014 Eindhoven	50 m freestyle S10
Bronze medal – third place	2018 Dublin	400 m freestyle S10
Mediterranean Games
Gold medal – first place	2009 Pescara	100 m freestyle S10
Gold medal – first place	2018 Tarragona	100 m freestyle S10
Women's adaptive rowing (PR3)
World Rowing Championships
Bronze medal – third place	2018 Plovdiv	PR3 mixed coxed four

Élodie Lorandi (born 31 May 1989) is a French Paralympic swimmer who won medals at the 2008 Summer Paralympics and the 2012 Summer Paralympics.

On 1 January 2013, Lorandi was made a Knight (Chevalier) of the Légion d'honneur.

Lorandi also competed as an adaptive rower on the French PR3 mixed coxed four team at the 2018 World Rowing Championships (bronze medal) and at the 2019 World Rowing Championships. She was one of the five French Paralympians who lit the cauldron of the 2024 Summer Paralympics in Paris.
