= Chantal Molenkamp =

Dutch Paralympic swimmer (born 1990)

Personal information
- Born: 11 November 1990 (age 35) Alkmaar, Netherlands
- Height: 1.57 m (5 ft 2 in)
- Weight: 42 kg (93 lb)

Sport
- Country: Netherlands
- Sport: Paralympic swimming
- Disability: Mixed connective tissue disease
- Disability class: S10
- Retired: 2016

Chantal Molenkamp (born 11 November 1990) is a retired Dutch Paralympic swimmer who competed in international level events. She competed at the 2012 and 2016 Summer Paralympics. She was diagnosed with mixed connective tissue disease when she was fifteen years old.
