= Monique Murphy =

Australian Paralympic swimmer

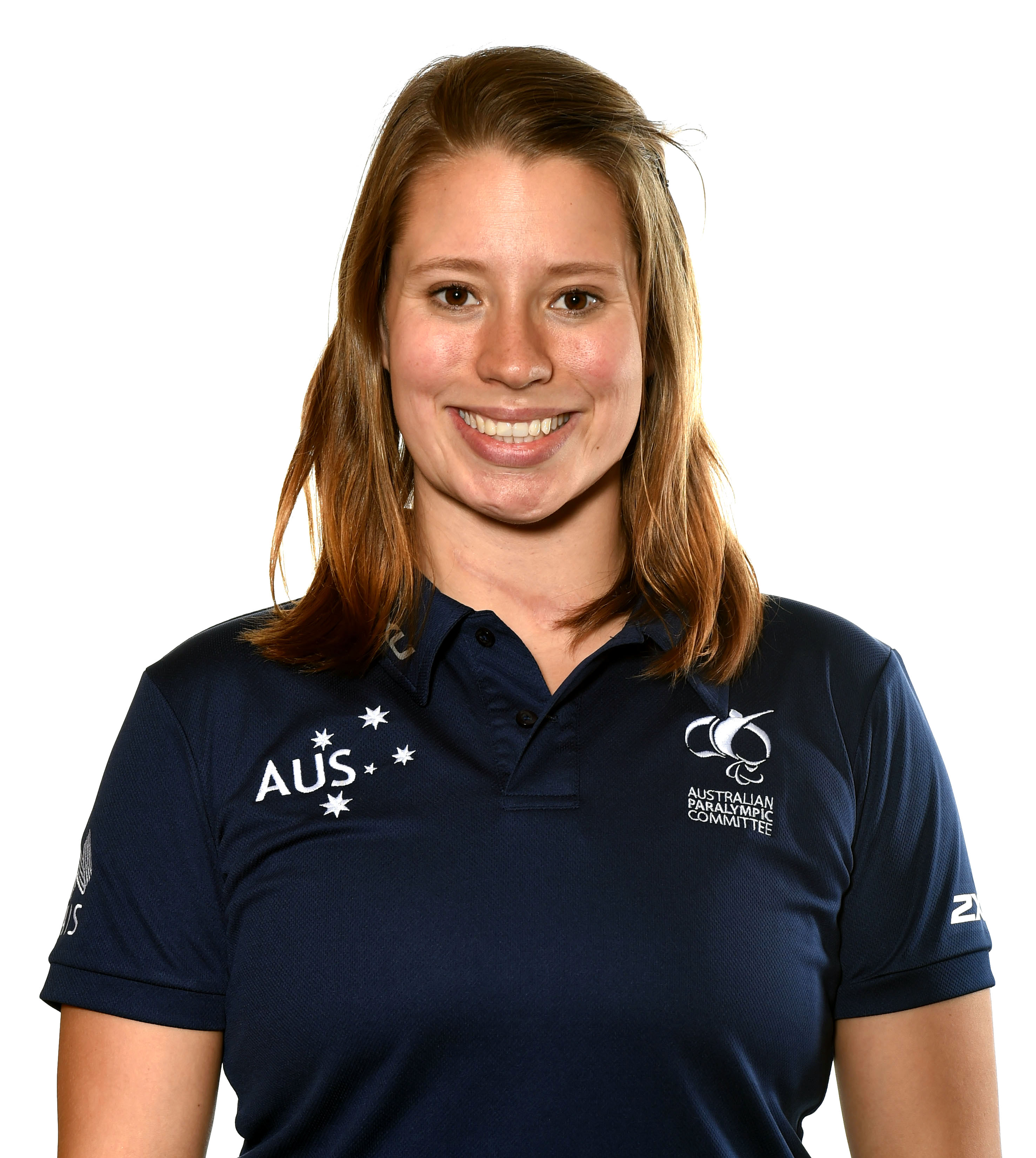
- 2016 Australian Paralympic team portrait of Monique Murphy

Personal information
- Nationality: Australia
- Born: 9 April 1994 (age 32) Wellington, New Zealand

Sport
- Country: Australia
- Sport: Swimming
- Disability: Amputee
- Disability class: S10
- Club: Vicentre
- Coached by: Alex Hirschauer
Medal record
Women's paralympic swimming
Representing Australia
Summer Paralympic Games
Silver medal – second place	2016 Rio de Janeiro	400 m Freestyle S10

Monique Murphy (born 9 April 1994) is an Australian Paralympic swimmer. She represented Australia at the 2016 Rio Paralympics where she won a silver medal.

== Personal ==
Murphy was born on 9 April 1994 in Wellington, New Zealand. In 2014, Murphy fell 20m from a fifth story balcony which left her in a coma. Murphy recalls her injuries when she woke, "I woke up in hospital with a broken jaw in two places, a cut to my neck close to the main artery and windpipe, a broken left collarbone, a tear in my triceps tendon, three broken ribs and a tibial plateau fracture." Murphy's injuries were too severe for recovery, which led to the amputation of her right leg below the knee. In 2016, she is studying a Bachelor of Social Work with honours at RMIT. She also volunteers with St Vincent de Paul with their youth program, and is an ambassador with Share the Dignity. Murphy now resides in Brisbane training alongside paralympians Brendan Hall and Lakeisha Patterson under coach Harley Connolly.

== Career ==
Murphy started swimming at a young age with the Tuggeranong Vikings Swim Club; swimming as an able-bodied swimmer. Since the accident in 2014, Murphy was determined to get back in the pool and started training at 2014 at Melbourne Vicentre Swimming Club in Melbourne. She now swims under the classification of S10 and was picked to travel with 30 other athletes to Glasgow for the IPC World Championships. Here, she placed 6th and 7th in the Women's 400m Freestyle (S10) and Women's 100m Butterfly (S10) respectively.

At the 2016 Rio Paralympics, she competed in four events. Murphy qualified for the final in the Women's 400m S10 and won a silver medal. She also competed in the following events but didn't progress to the finals: Women's 50m Freestyle S10, Women's 100m Freestyle S10 and Women's 100m Backstroke S10.

Murphy has revolutionized how she trains with a "prosthetic fin" which she calls her, "mermaid leg." This new leg helps her engage the muscles of her right leg when swimming. Her motto is "If your dreams don't scare you they aren't big enough". She also reflects on her disability and competing at Rio stating "As a kid growing up I always dreamed of going to the Olympics and this has come around in a different way than I had ever expected so, it's a second chance to go after my dream."

In 2016, she is a Victorian Institute of Sport scholarship holder and trains at Melbourne Vicentre. At the end of 2016, she relocated to the Gold Coast training with Southport Olympic with coach Glenn Baker and scholarship holder with the QAS. With the cancellation of the 2017 World Championships due to the earthquake in Mexico City, she finished No.1 on the world rankings for S10 400 freestyle for 2017. At the end of 2017, Monique moved to Brisbane to train with coach Harley Connolly at Lawnton Swim Club. She moved to Burpengary Regional Aquatic Center in 2019 to continue training with Harley Connolly.

== Recognition ==
In October 2018, she was awarded Swimming Australia's Optus Community Award for her role in inspiring the next generation of swimmers through participation in swimming clinics, Australia Swims, Optus Junior Dolphins and Olympics Unleashed.
