= Oliwia Jabłońska =

Polish Paralympic swimmer

Oliwia Jablonska
Personal information
- Nationality: Polish
- Born: 16 April 1997 (age 29) Wrocław, Poland

Sport
- Disability class: S10
- Club: START Wroclaw
- Coached by: Beata Pożarowczyk-Kuczko (national)
Medal record
Women's para swimming
Representing Poland
Paralympic Games
Silver medal – second place	2012 London	100 m butterfly S10
Bronze medal – third place	2016 Rio	100 m butterfly S10
Bronze medal – third place	2020 Tokyo	400 m freestyle S10
World Championships
Silver medal – second place	2013 Montreal	100 m butterfly S10
Silver medal – second place	2015 Glasgow	100 m butterfly S10
Silver medal – second place	2022 Madeira	400 m freestyle S10
Silver medal – second place	2023 Manchester	400 m freestyle S10
Bronze medal – third place	2015 Glasgow	400 m freestyle S10
Bronze medal – third place	2025 Singapore	400 m freestyle S10
European Championships
Gold medal – first place	2014 Eindhoven	100 m butterfly S10
Gold medal – first place	2026 Kocaeli	200 m ind. medley SM9
Silver medal – second place	2014 Eindhoven	400 m freestyle S10
Silver medal – second place	2014 Eindhoven	200 m ind. medley SM10
Bronze medal – third place	2014 Eindhoven	100 m freestyle S10
Silver medal – second place	2016 Funchal	100 m butterfly S10
Bronze medal – third place	2016 Funchal	400 m freestyle S10
Bronze medal – third place	2026 Kocaeli	100 m butterfly S9

Oliwia Jablonska (born 16 April 1997) is a Polish Paralympic swimmer competing in S10 classification events.

== Career ==
She competed at the 2012, 2016 and 2020 Summer Paralympics. At the 2020 Paralympics, she won a bronze medal in the 400 metre freestyle S10 event.
