= Isabel Yingüa Hernández =

Spanish Paralympic swimmer

Personal information
- Full name: Isabel Yinghua Hernández Santos
- Nationality: Spain
- Born: 17 July 1995 (age 31) Xi'an, China

Sport
- Sport: Swimming
Medal record
Representing Spain
Women's para swimming
European Championships
Gold medal – first place	2016 Funchal	100m freestyle relay 34pts
Silver medal – second place	2014 Eindhoven	100m freestyle relay 34pts
Bronze medal – third place	2016 Funchal	100 m butterfly S10
Women's para-cycling
Track World Championships
Bronze medal – third place	2025 Rio de Janeiro	Mixed team sprint C1–5
Bronze medal – third place	2026 Apeldoorn	Mixed team sprint C1–5

Isabel Yingüa Hernández Santos (born 17 July 1995 in Xi'an, China) is a Spanish para swimmer and para-cyclist.

== Personal ==
Hernández was born on July 17, 1995, in Xi'an, China. Because of issues during fetal development, she is missing four fingers on her left hand. She was adopted in 1997, and has two biological brothers and a sister who were also adopted. In 2012, she attended Athena College in Extremadura. She is from Mérida, Extremadura. In December 2013, she attended an event marking Spanish insurance company Santa Lucía Seguros becoming a sponsor of the Spanish Paralympic Committee, and consequently Plan ADOP which funds high performance Spanish disability sport competitors. She chose to attend the event because she wanted to show support for this type of sponsorship.

== Swimming ==
Hernández is an S10 classified swimmer. She is a member of the Escuelas Deportivas Mérida swim club. She started swimming when she was eight years old. She competes against able bodied swimmers and against other swimmers in her classification with disabilities. Her swimming is supported financially by Spain's Plan ADO.

Hernández competed at the 2009 Paralympic Swimming Championship of Spain by Autonomous Communities. That year, she also competed in the national youth swimming championships. In 2009, she competed at the IPC European Swimming Championships in Iceland in the 100 meter backstroke and 100 meter butterfly events. She competed at the 2010 Adapted Swimming World Championship in the Netherlands. She competed at the 2011 Paralympic Swimming Championship of Spain by Autonomous Communities.

As a 15-year-old, Hernández competed at the 2011 IPC European Swimming Championships in Berlin, Germany where she finished sixth in 200 meter individual medley. Other events she swam in included the 100 meter butterfly, 100 meter freestyle, 100 meter backstroke and the 4x100 meter medley relay. She finished second in the 100 meter butterfly and third in the 4x100 meter medley relay.

Belén Fernández was her coach in 2012. That year, she competed at the Paralympic Swimming Championship of Spain by Autonomous Communities.

She competed at the 2012 Summer Paralympics. Sarai Gascón Moreno, Esther Morales Fernández, Teresa Perales and Hernández finished fourth in the 4x100 meter freestyle relay event. In her three individual races in London, she failed to make the finals. She competed at the 2013 IPC Swimming World Championships as an 18-year-old. In 2013, she was one of seven Paralympic sportspeople to get a 2013/2014 "Iberdrola Foundation Scholarship" that was awarded by the Spanish Paralympic Committee, Iberdrola Foundation, the Spanish Sports Council and the Spanish Ministry of Social Services and Equality. It provided her with €490 a month for the ten academic months of the year.
