= Anaëlle Roulet =

French Paralympic swimmer (born 1996)

Personal information
- Born: 19 February 1996 (age 30) La Roche-sur-Yon, France
- Height: 1.62 m (5 ft 4 in)

Sport
- Country: France
- Sport: Paralympic swimming
- Disability: Disability
- Disability class: S10
- Club: Les Sables d'Olonne Natation
Medal record
Paralympic swimming
Representing France
World Championships
Silver medal – second place	2017 Mexico City	100 m backstroke S10
Silver medal – second place	2022 Madeira	100 m backstroke S10
Bronze medal – third place	2023 Manchester	100 m backstroke S10
European Championships
Bronze medal – third place	2016 Funchal	100 m backstroke S10
Bronze medal – third place	2018 Dublin	100 m backstroke S10

Anaëlle Roulet (born 19 February 1996) is a French Paralympic swimmer who competes in international level events, she swims backstroke and freestyle swimming.

== Career ==
She is a two-time World silver medalist and a two-time European bronze medalist, she has also competed at the Paralympic Games twice but did not medal.

== Personal life ==
Roulet was born with an underdeveloped lower right leg and has scoliosis.
