= Marije Oosterhuis =

Dutch Paralympic swimmer

Personal information
- Born: 21 June 1995 (age 31) Delfzijl, Netherlands
- Height: 1.69 m (5 ft 7 in)

Sport
- Country: Netherlands
- Sport: Paralympic swimming
- Disability: Sarcoma survivor
- Disability class: S10
- Club: Zwemvereniging Azuro, Delfzijl
Medal record
Paralympic swimming
Representing Netherlands
European Championships
Bronze medal – third place	2011 Berlin	Women's 100m backstroke S10

Marije Oosterhuis (born 21 June 1995) is a Dutch Paralympic swimmer who competes in international-level events. She has competed at the 2012 and 2016 Summer Paralympics. She developed synovial sarcoma in her right thigh in 2008 and she swims with only her left leg.
