= Shireen Sapiro =

South African Paralympic swimmer

Personal information
- Full name: Shireen Sapiro
- Nickname: Reen
- Nationality: South African
- Born: 25 January 1991 (age 35) Krugersdorp, South Africa

Sport
- Sport: Swimming
- Strokes: Backstroke
- Club: St Andrews Dragons Seagulls Swimming Club
Medal record
Women's swimming
Representing South Africa
Paralympic Games
Gold medal – first place	2008 Beijing	100 m backstroke S10
Bronze medal – third place	2012 London	100 m backstroke S10
Maccabiah Games
Silver medal – second place	2009 Israel	4x100 m freestyle relay
Bronze medal – third place	2009 Israel	4x200 m freestyle relay
Bronze medal – third place	2009 Israel	4x100 m medley relay

Shireen Sapiro (born 25 January 1991) is a South African Paralympic swimmer, who won a gold medal in the 100 m backstroke at the 2008 Summer Paralympics in Beijing, and a bronze medal in the 100m backstroke at the 2012 Summer Paralympics in London.

== Life ==
Sapiro was born on 25 January 1991 in Krugersdorp, South Africa.

On 9 April 2004, Sapiro was seriously injured in a waterskiing accident which resulted in her left leg being paralysed.

At the 2009 Maccabiah Games, Sapiro was appointed flag bearer for the South African delegation at the opening ceremony. While Sapiro generally competes in Paralympic events, at the Maccabiah Games, competed in the open competition of the swimming events against able-bodied swimmers.
