= Aurélie Rivard =

Canadian Paralympic swimmer

Personal information
- Nationality: Canadian
- Born: May 14, 1996 (age 30)

Sport
- Disability class: S10, SB9, SM10
Medal record
Women's para swimming
Representing Canada
Event	1st	2nd	3rd
Paralympic Games	6	4	3
World Championships	6	5	3
Commonwealth Games	0	1	1
Parapan American Games	6	1	0
Paralympic Games
Gold medal – first place	2016 Rio de Janeiro	50m freestyle S10
Gold medal – first place	2016 Rio de Janeiro	100m freestyle S10
Gold medal – first place	2016 Rio de Janeiro	400m freestyle S10
Gold medal – first place	2020 Tokyo	100m freestyle S10
Gold medal – first place	2020 Tokyo	400m freestyle S10
Gold medal – first place	2024 Paris	400 m freestyle S10
Silver medal – second place	2016 Rio de Janeiro	200m individual medley SM10
Silver medal – second place	2012 London	S10 400m freestyle
Silver medal – second place	2020 Tokyo	100m backstroke S10
Silver medal – second place	2024 Paris	100 m freestyle S10
Bronze medal – third place	2020 Tokyo	50m freestyle S10
Bronze medal – third place	2020 Tokyo	Women's 4x100 metre freestyle relay 34pts
Bronze medal – third place	2024 Paris	50 m freestyle S10
World Championships
Gold medal – first place	2015 Glasgow	50m freestyle S10
Gold medal – first place	2015 Glasgow	400m freestyle S10
Gold medal – first place	2022 Madeira	50m freestyle S10
Gold medal – first place	2022 Madeira	100m freestyle S10
Gold medal – first place	2023 Manchester	50m freestyle S10
Gold medal – first place	2023 Manchester	100m freestyle S10
Silver medal – second place	2013 Montreal	400m freestyle S10
Silver medal – second place	2013 Montreal	4x100m freestyle relay
Silver medal – second place	2013 Montreal	200m ind. medley SM10
Silver medal – second place	2015 Glasgow	200m ind. medley S10
Silver medal – second place	2015 Glasgow	100m freestyle S10
Bronze medal – third place	2013 Montreal	100m freestyle S10
Bronze medal – third place	2013 Montreal	50m freestyle S10
Bronze medal – third place	2022 Madeira	100m backstroke S10
Commonwealth Games
Silver medal – second place	2022 Birmingham	200m ind. medley SM10
Bronze medal – third place	2014 Glasgow	200m ind. medley SM10
Parapan American Games
Gold medal – first place	2015 Toronto	50m freestyle S10
Gold medal – first place	2015 Toronto	100m freestyle S10
Gold medal – first place	2015 Toronto	400m freestyle S10
Gold medal – first place	2015 Toronto	100m backstroke S10
Gold medal – first place	2015 Toronto	100m butterfly S10
Gold medal – first place	2015 Toronto	200m ind. medley S10
Silver medal – second place	2015 Toronto	100m breaststroke SB9

Aurélie Rivard (born May 14, 1996) is a Canadian Paralympic swimmer. After winning three Paralympics gold medals, claiming a silver Paralympic medal and setting two World Records and a Paralympic Record at the 2016 Summer Olympics in Rio de Janeiro, she was named Canada's flag-bearer for the closing ceremony.

Rivard won five medals at the 2020 Summer Paralympics.

== Career ==
Rivard is from Saint-Jean-sur-Richelieu, where she trained at the Club de natation du Haut-Richelieu. In 2017 she moved to Montreal and began training with Canada's High Performance Center. She took up competitive swimming in 2008; with an impairment in her left hand she competes in the S10, SB9 and SM10 disability classifications. She currently holds three World Records in her category.

Rivard competed at the 2010 IPC Swimming World Championships but did not win any medals. At the 2012 London Paralympics she entered six events and won silver in the S10 400 m freestyle. She won five medals at the 2013 World Championships including two silver, two bronze and joint second place in the 200 m medley. At the 2014 Commonwealth Games she won bronze in the 200 m individual medley.

In 2014 Swimming Canada named Rivard "Female Para-Swimmer of the Year".

At the 2015 Parapan American Games in Toronto, Canada, Rivard, who was 19 at the time, became the most decorated female athlete of Parapan Am history, after winning seven medals, six of which were gold.
