= Wheelchair rugby at the 2012 Summer Paralympics – Rosters =

This is a list of the players who were on the rosters of the given teams that participated in the 2012 Summer Paralympics for wheelchair rugby.

== Teams ==
=== Australia ===
Name
Cody Meakin
Nazim Erdem
Ryan Scott
Jason Lees
Ben Newton
Josh Hose
Greg Smith
Ryley Batt
Andrew Harrison
Chris Bond
Cameron Carr

=== Belgium ===
Name
Bob Vanacker
Gunther Meersschaut
Peter Genyn
Lars Mertens
Ronald Verhaegen
Raf Hendrix
Bieke Ketelbuters
Frederik Windey
David Duquenne
Ludwig Budeners
Ive Theuwissen

=== Canada ===
Name
Zak Madell
Travis Murao
Patrice Simard
Mike Whitehead
David Willsie
Fabien Lavoie
Trevor Hirschfield
Ian Chan
Jason Crone
Patrice Dagenais
Jared Funk
Garett Hickling

=== France ===
Name
Riadh Sallem
Eric Meurisse
Nicolas Rioux
Pablo Neuman
Christophe Corompt
Steeve Gernigon
Adrien Chalmin
Mathieu Moreau
Sebastien Lhuissier

=== Great Britain ===
Name
Mandip Sehmi
Aaron Phipps
Myles Pearson
Ross Morrison
Mike Kerr
Bulbul Hussain
Kylie Grimes
Jonathan Coggan
Steve Brown
Andy Barrow
David Anthony

=== Japan ===
Name
Kazuhiko Kanno
Manabu Tamura
Shin Nakazato
Shin Shimakawa
Daisuke Ikezaki
Hiroyuki Misaka
Yoshito Sato
Takeshi Shoji
Hidefumi Wakayama
Koichi Ogino
Tadanori Kawashita
Kotaro Kishi

=== Sweden ===
Name
Stefan Jansson
Mikael Wahlberg
Mikael Norlin
Tobias Sandberg
Per-Johan Uhlman
Alfredo Alvarez Romero
Rickard Lofgren
Glenn Adaszak
Martin Bretz
Andreas Collin
Tomas Hjert
Per-Arne Kulle

=== United States ===
Name
Nicholas Springer
Adam Scaturro
Jason Regier
Seth Mcbride
Scott Hogsett
Derrick Helton
Will Groulx
Joe Delagrave
Chad Cohn
Andy Cohn
Charles Aoki
Chance Sumne

Source: Paralympic.org
