= Wheelchair rugby at the 2012 Summer Paralympics =

Wheelchair rugby at the XIV Paralympic Games
- Venue: Basketball Arena
- Dates: 5 – 9 September 2012
- Competitors: 96 (8 teams)

Medalists
1st place, gold medalist(s)		Australia	Australia
2nd place, silver medalist(s)		Canada	Canada
3rd place, bronze medalist(s)		United States	United States

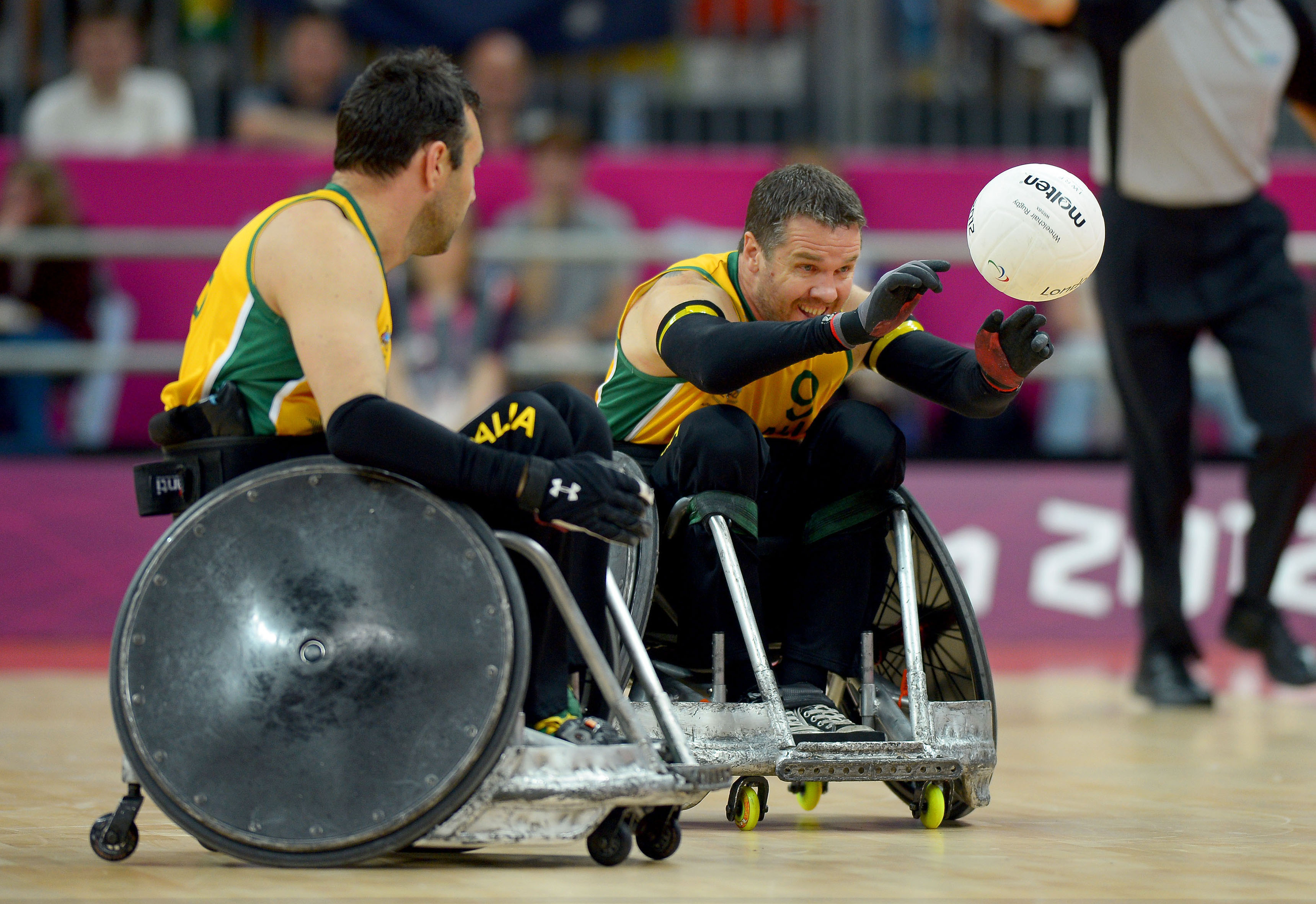
Greg Smith unloads a pass at the London 2012 Games

Wheelchair rugby at the 2012 Summer Paralympics was held in the Basketball Arena, London from 5 September to 9 September. There was one event where 8 teams competed. Though a mixed gender event the vast majority of competitors at the games were male.

== Qualification ==
A NPC may enter one team. The host country directly qualified, as it had a rank on the IWRF Wheelchair Rugby World Ranking List on 31 January 2012. Two qualification spots went to the top two NPCs on the ranking list that were not otherwise qualified.

Qualified	Means of qualification	Date	Venue	Berths
Great Britain	Host country			1
United States	2010 IWRF Wheelchair Rugby World Championships	21–26 September 2010	(Canada) Vancouver	1
Canada	2011 IWRF Wheelchair Rugby Zonal Championships – Americas	18–25 September 2011	(Colombia) Bogotá	1
Sweden; Belgium	2011 IWRF Wheelchair Rugby Zonal Championships – European	1–9 October 2011	(Switzerland) Nottwil	2
Australia	2011 IWRF Wheelchair Rugby Zonal Championships – Asia, Oceania	2–10 November 2011	(South Korea) Seoul	1
Japan; France	IWRF Wheelchair Rugby World Ranking	31 January 2012		2

== Tournament ==
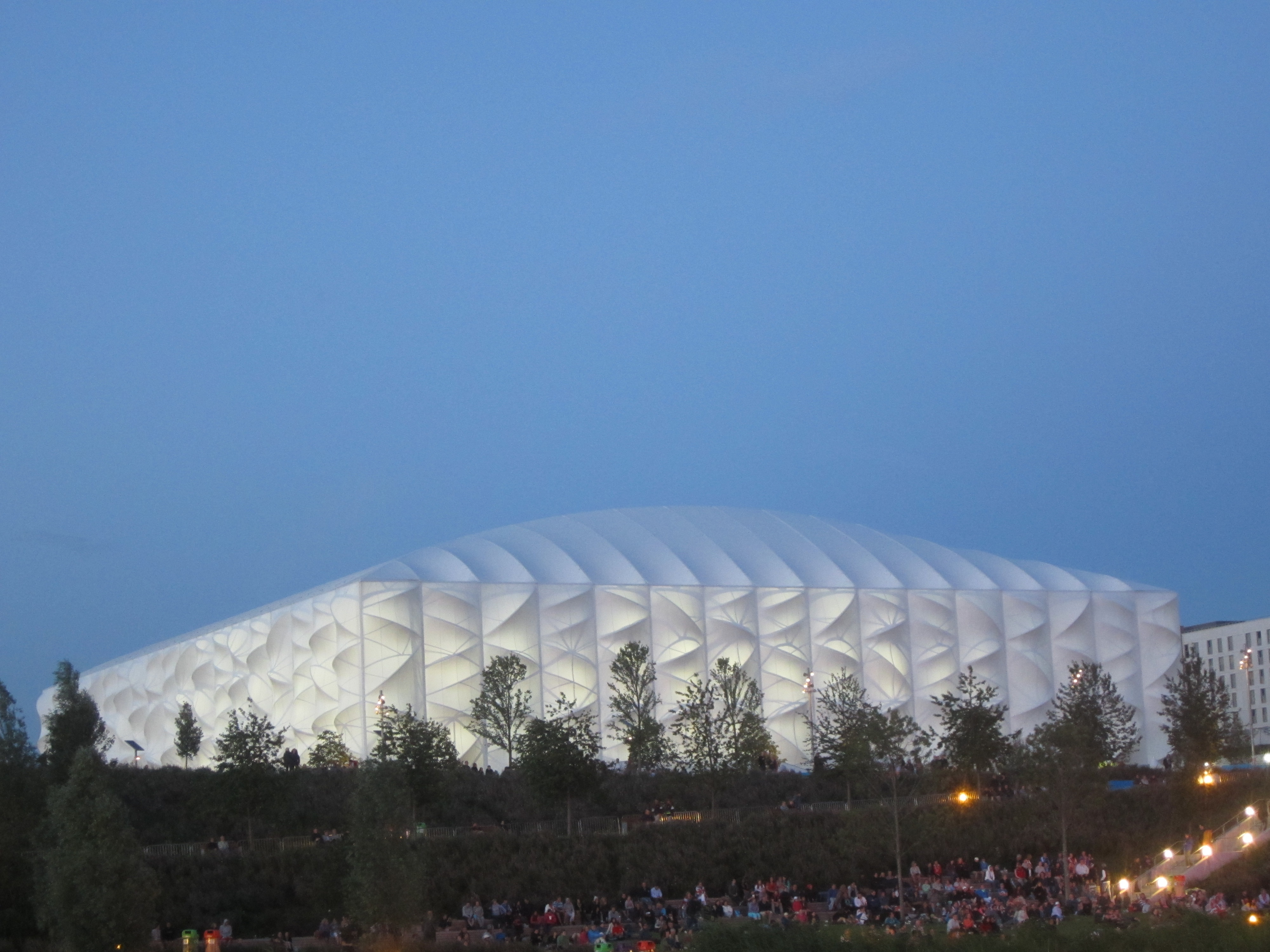
The temporary Basketball Arena in Olympic Park, had a capacity of 10,000 spectators

The tournament took place from 5 to 9 September at the Basketball Arena in Olympic Park. It consisted of an initial round-robin group stage of two groups of four teams, followed by a fifth to eighth place playoff round for the bottom two from each group. The top two teams from each group went through to the semifinals and gold and bronze-medal matches.

September	5 / 6 / 7	8	9
Phase	Preliminary; Round	Classification 5-8; Placement 5-6 & 7-8; Semifinals 1	Gold-medal match Bronze-medal match

=== Group stage ===
==== Group A ====
Team	Pld	W	D	L	GF	GA	GD	Pts	Qualification
United States (USA)	3	3	0	0	190	136	+54	6	Semifinals
Japan (JPN)	3	2	0	1	164	159	+5	4	Semifinals
Great Britain (GBR)	3	1	0	2	140	157	−17	2	Eliminated
France (FRA)	3	0	0	3	150	192	−42	0	Eliminated

5 September 2012
14:00

United States	56 – 44	Great Britain
Aoki – 14; Groulx – 9 Team – 7 McBride – 6 Sumner – 5 A. Cohn – 5 Scaturro – 3 Helton – 2 Delagrave – 2 Regier – 1 C. Cohn – 1 Springer – 1	Report	Phipps – 16; Anthony – 11; Brown – 5 Morrison – 5 Barrow – 3 Kerr – 2 Sehmi – 1 Team – 1

Basketball Arena
Attendance: 8,273
Referee: Pierre-Alexandre Brière (CAN), Chris van de Riet (NED)

5 September 2012
21:15

Japan	65 – 56	France
	Report

Basketball Arena
Attendance: 3,642
Referee: Mitch Carr (USA), Alexander Schreiner (GER)

6 September 2012
19:00

Great Britain	57 – 50	France
	Report

Basketball Arena
Attendance: 5,186
Referee: Motoko Izumiya (JPN), Darren Roberts (USA)

6 September 2012
21:15

Japan	48 – 64	United States
	Report

Basketball Arena
Attendance: 2,959
Referee: Philip Washbourn (NZL), Dave Woods (GBR)

7 September 2012
15:00

Great Britain	39 – 51	Japan
	Report

Basketball Arena
Attendance: 8,458
Referee: Mitch Carr (USA), Philip Washbourn (NZL)

7 September 2012
17:15

United States	70 – 44	France
	Report

Basketball Arena
Attendance: 6,259
Referee: Pierre-Alexandre Brière (CAN), Dave Woods (GBR)

==== Group B ====
Team	Pld	W	D	L	GF	GA	GD	Pts	Qualification
Australia (AUS)	3	3	0	0	182	142	+40	6	Semifinals
Canada (CAN)	3	2	0	1	163	166	−3	4	Semifinals
Sweden (SWE)	3	1	0	2	151	155	−4	2	Eliminated
Belgium (BEL)	3	0	0	3	135	168	−33	0	Eliminated

5 September 2012
16:15

Sweden	52 – 42	Belgium
Uhlmann – 15; Hjert – 9 Jansson – 7 Sandberg – 6 Kulle – 5 Norlin – 4 Team – 4 Collin – 2	Report	Mertens – 20; Verhaegen – 9 Genyn – 6 Vanacker – 3 Team – 2 Budeners – 1 Meersschaut – 1

Basketball Arena
Attendance: 4,404
Referee: Motoko Izumiya (JPN), Philip Washbourn (NZL)

5 September 2012
19:00

Australia	64 – 52	Canada
Batt – 37; Bond – 10; Team – 4 Carr – 3 Harrison – 3 Smith – 2 Newton – 1 Hose – 1 Lees – 1 Meakin – 1 Scott – 1	Report	Lavoie – 9 Hirschfield – 8 Crone – 7 Madell – 7 Hickling – 6 Whitehead – 5 Willsie – 4 Dagenais – 2 Chan – 2 Simard – 2

Basketball Arena
Attendance: 5,539
Referee: Darren Roberts (USA), Dave Woods (GBR)

6 September 2012
14:00

Sweden	47 – 60	Australia
Uhlmann – 9 Norlin – 8 Kulle – 7 Hjelt – 7 Collin – 6 Team – 4 Sandberg – 3 Jansson – 2 Wahlberg – 1	Report	Batt – 30; Bond – 14; Team – 4 Carr – 3 Newton – 2 Smith – 2 Harrison – 2 Hose – 1 Lees – 1 Meakin – 1

Basketball Arena
Attendance: 5,622
Referee: Pierre-Alexandre Brière (CAN), Alexander Schreiner (GER)

6 September 2012
16:15

Canada	58 – 50	Belgium
Madell – 18; Hickling – 9 Hirschfield – 9 Lavoie – 5 Chan – 4 Whitehead – 3 Simard – 3 Team – 3 Willsie – 2 Funk – 1	Report	Mertens – 24; Genyn – 10; Verhaegen – 5 Budeners – 4 Team – 4 Vanacker – 3

Basketball Arena
Attendance: 6,225
Referee: Mitch Carr (USA), Chris van de Riet (NED)

7 September 2012
10:00

Australia	58 – 43	Belgium
Batt – 29; Carr – 11; Bond – 9 Smith – 4 Hose – 1 Lees – 1 Meakin – 1 Harrison – 1 Team – 1	Report	Mertens – 14; Genyn – 11; Verhaegen – 5 Hendrix – 4 Team – 4 Budeners – 3 Vanacker – 2

Basketball Arena
Attendance: 2,822
Referee: Motoko Izumiya (JPN), Chris van de Riet (NED)

7 September 2012
12:15

Canada	53 – 52	Sweden
	Report

Basketball Arena
Attendance: 5,469
Referee: Darren Roberts (USA), Alexander Schreiner (GER)

=== Playoffs ===
Classification round
8 September 2012 - 09:30
Great Britain	54
Belgium	49
8 September 2012 - 11:45
Sweden	58
France	48

Fifth place
8 September 2012 - 21:15
Great Britain	59
Sweden	47
Seventh place
8 September 2012 - 19:00
Belgium	54
France	50

==== 5-8th-place semifinals ====
8 September 2012
14:00

Great Britain	54 – 49	Belgium
	Report

Basketball Arena
Attendance: 1,567
Referee: Pierre-Alexandre Brière (CAN), Philip Washbourn (NZL)

8 September 2012
14:00

Sweden	58 – 48	France
	Report

Basketball Arena
Attendance: 2,994
Referee: Motoko Izumiya (JPN), Dave Woods (GBR)

==== Seventh-place match ====
8 September 2012
19:00

Belgium	54 – 50	France
	Report

Basketball Arena
Attendance: 1,734
Referee: Philip Washbourn (NZL), Dave Woods (GBR)

==== Fifth-place match ====
8 September 2012
21:15

Great Britain	59 – 47	Sweden
	Report

Basketball Arena
Attendance: 2,484
Referee: Mitch Carr (USA), Alexander Schreiner (GER)

=== Medal round ===
Bracket

Semifinals
8 September 2012 - 16:15
United States	49
Canada	50
8 September 2012 - 14:00
Australia	59
Japan	45

Gold-medal match
9 September 2012 - 14:15
Canada	51
Australia	66
Bronze-medal match
9 September 2012 - 12:00
United States	53
Japan	43

==== Semifinals ====
8 September 2012
14:00

Australia	59 – 45	Japan
Batt – 27; Bond – 14; Smith – 6 Scott – 2 Lees – 2 Meakin – 2 Newton – 1 Carr – 1 Harrison – 1 Team – 3	Report	Ikezakli – 24; Nakazato – 7 Kanno – 6 Shimakawa – 4 Sato – 2 Team – 2

Basketball Arena
Attendance: 5,333
Referee: Mitch Carr (USA), Darren Roberts (USA)
8 September 2012
16:15

United States	49 – 50	Canada
	Report

Basketball Arena
Attendance: 4,324
Referee: Alexander Schreiner (GER), Chris van de Riet (NED)

==== Bronze-medal match ====
9 September 2012
12:00

United States	53 – 43	Japan
	Report

Basketball Arena
Attendance: 7,852
Referee: Pierre-Alexandre Briére (CAN), Philip Washbourn (NZL)

==== Gold-medal match ====
9 September 2012
14:15

Canada	51 – 66	Australia
Madell – 11; Hickling – 7 Whitehead – 7 Murao – 6 Chan – 5 Willsie – 4 Simard – 3 Lavoie – 2 Dagenais – 1 Hirschfield – 1 Team – 4	Report	Batt – 37; Bond – 15; Carr – 4 Smith – 2 Scott – 1 Lees – 1 Meakin – 1 Newton – 1 Harrison – 1 Team – 3

Basketball Arena
Attendance: 9,048
Referee: Darren Roberts (USA), Chris van de Riet (NED)

== Ranking ==
Place	Team
1st place, gold medalist(s)	Australia
2nd place, silver medalist(s)	Canada
3rd place, bronze medalist(s)	United States
4.	Japan
5.	Great Britain
6.	Sweden
7.	Belgium
8.	France

== Medalists ==
Event	Gold	Silver	Bronze
Mixed team	Australia (AUS) Ben Newton; Nazim Erdem; Ryley Batt; Josh Hose; Jason Lees; Cody Meakin; Greg Smith; Chris Bond; Ryan Scott (captain); Cameron Carr; Andrew Harrison; Coach: Brad Dubberley	Canada (CAN) Jason Crone; Patrice Dagenais; Garett Hickling; Ian Chan; Mike Whitehead; Trevor Hirschfield; Fabien Lavoie; Travis Murao; Jared Funk; David Willsie (captain); Patrice Simard; Zak Madell; Coach: Kevin Orr	United States (USA) Chance Sumner; Seth McBride; Adam Scaturro; Chuck Aoki; Jason Regier; Scott Hogsett; Nick Springer; Will Groulx (captain); Andy Cohn; Chad Cohn; Derrick Helton; Joe Delagrave; Coach: James Gumbert

== See also ==
- Wheelchair rugby at the 2012 Summer Paralympics – Rosters
