= United States national wheelchair rugby team =

United States USA
- IWRF Ranking: 3rd
- IWRF Zone: IWRF Americas
- National Federation: USQRA
- Coach: (United States) James Gumbert

Paralympic Games
- Appearances: 7
- Medals: Gold: 1996, 2000,2008 Silver : 2016, 2020, 2024; Bronze: 2004, 2012

World Championships
- Appearances: 8
- Medals: (gold) Gold: 1995, 1998, 2006, 2010,2026; (silver) Silver: 2002,2022; (bronze) Bronze: 2014,2018

IWRF Americas Championship
- Appearances: 6
- Medals: Gold: 2009, 2011, 2013, 2017,2022,2025

Uniforms
Home	Away

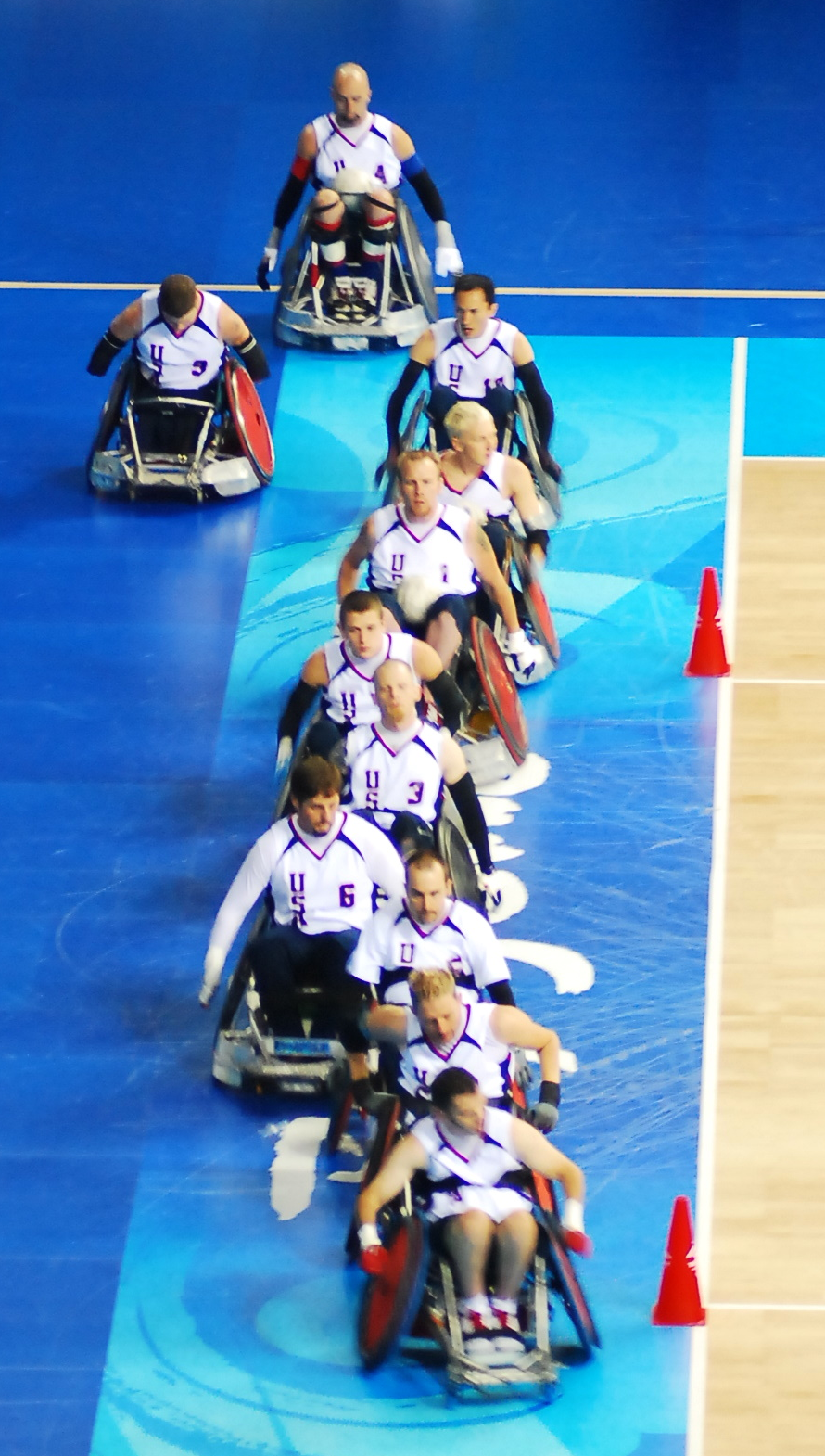
The USA players at the 2008 Paralympics in Beijing.

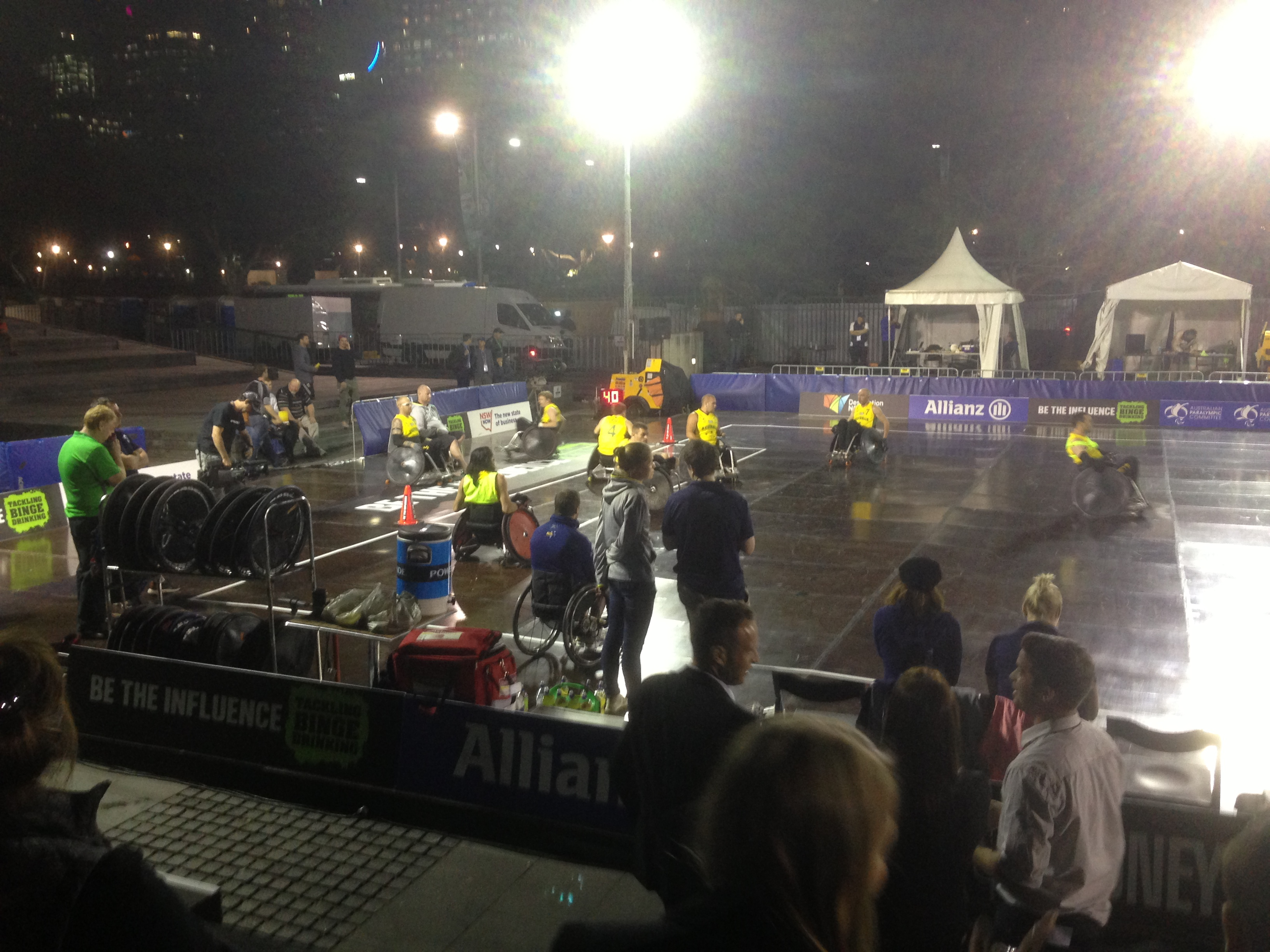
2013 Wheelchair Rugby Tri-Nation series - Australia v United States in Sydney.

The United States national wheelchair rugby team represents the United States in international wheelchair rugby. The USA is the most successful team in international competition, winning medals in all five Paralympic tournaments it has entered, coming away with two golds.

== 2004 Paralympics (Athens) ==
A 2005 Academy Award nominated documentary film called Murderball, centers on the rivalry between the Canadian and U.S. teams leading up to the 2004 Paralympic Games. It was directed by Henry Alex Rubin and Dana Adam Shapiro, and produced by Jeffrey Mandel and Shapiro.

== 2012 Paralympics (London) ==
The USA has clinched a berth in the 2012 Paralympics in London by virtue of its World Championship in Vancouver, British Columbia.

== Roster ==
(Roster for the 2011 IWRF Americas Championship)

#	Class	Name	Year Born	Team
	0.5	Travis Anderson		(United States) Tucson Pterodactyls
5	3.0	Chuck Aoki	1991	(United States) Tucson Pterodactyls
	0.5	Clayton Braun		(United States) St. Louis Rugby Rams
11	2.0	Andy Cohn	1978	(United States) Sharp Edge
12	1.5	Chad Cohn		(United States) Tucson Pterodactyls
14	2.0	Joe Delagrave		(United States) Phoenix Heat
10	2.0	Will Groulx	1974	(United States) Portland Pounders
13	2.0	Derrick Helton		(United States) Tucson Pterodactyls
8	1.0	Scott Hogsett	1972	(United States) Phoenix Heat
2	2.0	Seth McBride	1983	(United States) Portland Pounders
	3.0	Delvin McMillan		(United States) Lakeshore Demolition
	3.0	Jeff Odom		(United States) Texas Stampede
7	0.5	Jason Reiger	1975	(United States) Denver Harlequins
4	1.5	Adam Scaturo		(United States) Denver Harlequins
9	2.0	Nick Springer	1985	(United States) Phoenix Heat
	2.5	Josh Wheeler		(United States) Utah Scorpions

== Competitive record ==
=== Paralympic Games ===
Paralympic Games results
Year	Position	Pld	W	L
(Australia) 2000	1st	5	5	0
(Greece) 2004	3rd	6	5	1
(China) 2008	1st	5	5	0
(United Kingdom) 2012	3rd	5	4	1
(Brazil) 2016	2nd	5	4	1
(Japan) 2020	2nd	5	4	1
(France) 2024	2nd	5	3	2
Total		36	30	6

=== IWRF World Championship ===
Year	Position	Pld	W	L
(Switzerland) 1995	1st	9	9	0
(Canada) 1998	1st	?	?	?
(Sweden) 2002	2nd	7	5	2
(Canada) 2010	1st	7	7	0
(Denmark) 2014	3rd	7	6	1
(Australia) 2018	3rd	7	6	1
(Denmark) 2022	2nd	7	6	2
(Brazil) 2026	1st	7	7	0
Total		50	37	4

== Past Rosters ==
- 2008 Paralympic Games: finished 1st among 8 teams

Jason Regier, Scott Hogsett, Norm Lyduch, Andy Cohn, Will Groulx, Bryan Kirkland, Seth McBride, Nick Springer, Chance Sumner, Mark Zupan, Joel Wilmoth, (Coach: James Gumbert, Assistant Coaches: Ed Suhr)

- 2010 World Championship: finished 1st among 12 teams

Chuck Aoki, Andy Cohn, Chad Cohn, Will Groulx, Derrick Helton, Scott Hogsett, Joe Delagrave, Seth McBride, Jason Regier, Adam Scaturro, Nick Springer, Chance Sumner, (Coach: James Gumbert)
