= Mandy Marchiano =

American wheelchair rugby player (born 1990)

Personal information
- Born: September 5, 1990 (age 35) Colonial Heights, Virginia, U.S.
- Education: Virginia Commonwealth University

Sport
- Sport: Wheelchair rugby
Medal record
Wheelchair rugby
Representing the United States
World Championships
| Gold medal – first place | 2026 São Paulo | Team |
Americas Championship
| Gold medal – first place | 2025 São Paulo | Team |

Mandy Marchiano (born September 5, 1990) is an American wheelchair rugby player from Colonial Heights, Virginia.

== Early life and education ==
Born in Colonial Heights, Virginia, Marchiano grew up being active and playing sports such as cheerleading, dancing, soccer and swimming. On November 28, 2003, she was involved in a road accident while travelling in a van that left her hospitalized for several months and paralyzed from the chest down. As a result of the accident, she also lost the use of her hands, prompting her to use specialized gloves when lifting weights and to move her wheelchair. Marchiano attended Richard Bland College, where she earned her associate's degree, and later Virginia Commonwealth University, where she graduated with a bachelor's degree in biology and chemistry.

== Rugby career ==
Marchiano decided to take up parasports after watching the 2016 Summer Paralympics. She came across Sportable in Richmond, where she tried out multiple sports before deciding to choose wheelchair rugby in 2017. On the club level, she has played for the Sportable Possums.

On January 11, 2025, Marchiano was officially named to the United States national wheelchair rugby team roster for the National Training Squad. In July 2025, she was added to the U.S. squad that went on win gold at the 2025 Americas Championship that month. In August 2026, she was part of the U.S. national team that won gold at the 2026 World Championship.

== Personal life ==
Outside wheelchair rugby, Marchiano works as a peer mentor at the United Spinal Association of Virginia.
