= Trevor Hirschfield =

Canadian wheelchair rugby player

- Born: December 21, 1983 (age 42) Parksville, British Columbia, Canada

Rugby union career
International career
Years	Team	Apps	(Points)
–	Canada		
Medal record
Men's wheelchair rugby
Representing Canada
Paralympic Games
Bronze medal – third place	2008 Beijing	Team competition
Silver medal – second place	2012 London	Team competition
World Championships
Silver medal – second place	2014 Odense	Team competition
Parapan American Games
Gold medal – first place	2015 Toronto	Team competition
Silver medal – second place	2019 Lima	Team competition
Silver medal – second place	2023 Santiago	Team competition

Trevor Hirschfield (born December 21, 1983) is a Canadian Wheelchair rugby player, who participated Beijing, London, and Rio Paralympic Games. At the age of 16, after a traffic accident where his van went over a cliff, he was paralyzed below the neck. During the 2012 Summer Paralympics his team won 58–50 over Belgium with Hirschfield toppling their star Lars Mertens.
