= Zak Madell =

Canadian wheelchair rugby player

Personal information
- Born: March 28, 1994 (age 32) Edmonton, Alberta, Canada
- Height: 188 cm (6 ft 2 in)
Medal record
Men's wheelchair rugby
Representing Canada
Paralympic Games
Silver medal – second place	2012 London	Team competition
World Championships
Silver medal – second place	2014 Odense	Team competition
Parapan American Games
Gold medal – first place	2015 Toronto	Team competition
Silver medal – second place	2019 Lima	Team competition
Silver medal – second place	2023 Santiago	Team competition

Zak Madell (born March 28, 1994) is a Canadian wheelchair rugby player, classified as impairment sport class 3.5, who made his international debut at the 2011 Americas qualification Tournament. He has since participated at London Paralympic Games, at 2014 IWRF World Championship in Odense, Denmark, (where he was elected as the MVP) and Toronto 2015 Parapan American Games.
