= Derrick Helton =

American wheelchair rugby player

- Born: 1985 (age 40–41) Tuscumbia, Missouri, U.S.
- Height: 5 ft 8 in (1.73 m)

Rugby union career
International career
Years	Team	Apps	(Points)
–	USA		
Medal record
Men's wheelchair rugby
Representing the United States
Paralympic Games
Gold medal – first place	2008 Beijing	Team competition
Bronze medal – third place	2012 London	Team competition
World Championships
Gold medal – first place	2010 Vancouver	Team competition
U.S. National Championships
Bronze medal – third place	2010	Team competition
Gold medal – first place	2011	Team competition
Gold medal – first place	2012	Team competition
American Zonals
Gold medal – first place	2009	Team competition
Gold medal – first place	2011	Team competition

Derrick Helton (born 1985) is an American Paralympic wheelchair rugby player from Tuscumbia, Missouri. In 2011 and 2012 he was a U.S. National Champion and won a gold medal and in 2010 he was awarded bronze at the same place. He also was a 2009 and 2011 American Zonals gold medalist and also won gold at the 2008 Summer Paralympics and bronze at the 2012 ones. In 2010 he was also awarded with the gold medal for his participation at the World championship.
