= Mike Whitehead (wheelchair rugby) =

Canadian wheelchair rugby player

Personal information
- Born: November 25, 1975 (age 50) Harrow, Ontario, Canada
- Height: 185 cm (6 ft 1 in)
Medal record
Men's wheelchair rugby
Representing Canada
Paralympic Games
Silver medal – second place	2004 Athens	Team competition
Bronze medal – third place	2008 Beijing	Team competition
Silver medal – second place	2012 London	Team competition
World Championships
Silver medal – second place	2014 Odense	Team competition
Gold medal – first place	2002 Gothenburg	Team competition
Parapan American Games
Silver medal – second place	2019 Lima	Team competition
Silver medal – second place	2023 Santiago	Team competition

Mike Whitehead (born November 25, 1975) is a Canadian wheelchair rugby player. He has been with the team since 2001 and has won medals at several Paralympic Games. He was recruited to wheelchair rugby directly out of his rehabilitation hospital by teammate David Willsie and made the team less than a year later.
