= Marchiano =

Marchiano is an Italian surname. Notable people with the surname include:

- Bruce Marchiano (born 1956), American actor
- Mandy Marchiano (born 1990), American wheelchair rugby player
- Sal Marchiano (born 1941), American sportscaster
- Sam Marchiano, American sportscaster, documentary filmmaker and activist
