= Chuck Aoki =

American wheelchair rugby player

- Born: Charles Aoki; March 7, 1991 (age 35) Minneapolis, Minnesota, U.S.

Rugby union career
International career
Years	Team	Apps	(Points)
–	USA		
Medal record
Men's wheelchair rugby
Representing United States
Paralympic Games
Silver medal – second place	2016 Rio de Janeiro	Team
Silver medal – second place	2020 Tokyo	Team
Silver medal – second place	2024 Paris	Team
Bronze medal – third place	2012 London	Team
World Championships
Gold medal – first place	2010 Vancouver	Team
Bronze medal – third place	2014 Denmark	Team
Bronze medal – third place	2018 Sydney	Team
Silver medal – second place	2022 Denmark	Team
Parapan American Games
Gold medal – first place	2023 Santiago	Team
Gold medal – first place	2019 Lima	Team
Silver medal – second place	2015 Toronto	Team

Charles "Chuck" Aoki (born March 7, 1991) is an American wheelchair rugby player who plays for the United States national wheelchair rugby team. He has represented the United States at the Paralympics in 2012, 2016, 2020, and 2024. He is regarded as one of the top 3.0 classified players in the world. He now lives in Ypsilanti Township, Michigan, with his wife, Elizabeth, and their two dogs. Liz is a social worker and therapist who is also disabled; they met at a wheelchair rugby tournament in 2017 and later married in 2022. In addition to his work as an athlete, he sits on several committees within the USOPC and works at the University of Michigan’s Adaptive Sports & Fitness department.

== Early life and education ==
Aoki was born in Minneapolis, Minnesota, to parents Andrew Aoki and Jennifer Nelson. He was born with hereditary sensory autonomic neuropathy (HSAN), a rare genetic disorder that inhibits the feeling in his hands and feet. His behaviors and abilities were nonetheless similar to typical children and he played baseball with his friends until age 6. His mother once noticed that his knee had begun swelling, only to find out that he had broken his femur. Aoki continued walking once he healed, but he was advised by his doctor to use a wheelchair from the age of 12 as his condition progressed.

Aoki started going by "Chuck" — a common nickname for "Charles" — at age 10, after telling his doctor it was his name, despite never having used the name before.

Aoki’s father’s family is of Japanese descent. His great-grandparents lived in Japan most of their lives before immigrating to the United States in the early 1900s. His grandparents and great-grandparents were incarcerated in internment camps in the United States during the peak of World War II. Aoki’s grandfather joined the U.S. Army following the release of his family members who were imprisoned in the camps.

Aoki graduated from Southwest High School in Minneapolis. He earned his master's degree in public policy at the University of Minnesota.

== Career ==
Aoki started out playing wheelchair basketball at the age of 6, eventually winning back-to-back national championships with the Jr. Rolling Timberwolves as a teenager.

Aoki switched to wheelchair rugby at the age of 15. He had seen the 2005 American documentary film Murderball, about the journey of the American wheelchair rugby players in the lead-up to the 2004 Summer Paralympics, and was inspired to give the sport a try.

Aoki made his wheelchair rugby international debut in 2009 and has since become a prominent member of the United States national wheelchair rugby team. He clinched the gold medal with the national team at the 2009 American Zonal Championship and was part of the USA side that triumphed at the 2010 Wheelchair Rugby World Championship. United States Quad Rugby Association named him as the National Athlete of the Year in 2011.

Aoki made his debut appearance at the Paralympics representing the United States in London in 2012 as part of the bronze medal–winning wheelchair rugby team. He was a key member of the USA side that won the 2013 Wheelchair Rugby Tri-Nations tournament. He was adjudged as the best 3.0 class player during the 2014 Wheelchair Rugby World Championship, where defending-champions USA claimed a bronze medal.

Aoki was a key member of the USA side that narrowly missed out on winning the gold medal in wheelchair rugby at the 2016 Summer Paralympics, losing to Australia in the final, 59–58. He captained the U.S. national wheelchair rugby team at the 2018 Wheelchair Rugby World Championship, where USA claimed a bronze medal. He won gold medal with the USA team in the men's wheelchair tournament at the 2019 Parapan American Games.

The United States Olympic & Paralympic Committee named Aoki one of two flag bearers, alongside Melissa Stockwell, to lead the United States contingent at the opening ceremony of the delayed 2020 Summer Paralympics in Tokyo. Prior to competing at his third Paralympic Games in 2021, he underwent six surgeries for serious leg infection in February 2021.
