= Chance Sumner =

American wheelchair rugby player

Chance Benton Sumner
- Born: 1977 (age 48–49); Colorado Springs, Colorado, U.S.
- Died: January 3, 2023; Fruita, Colorado, U.S.
- Height: 6 ft 5 in (196 cm)

Medal record

Men's wheelchair rugby

Representing the United States

Paralympic Games
Gold medal – first place	2008 Beijing	Team competition
Bronze medal – third place	2012 London	Team competition

World Championships
Gold medal – first place	2006 Christchurch	Team competition
Gold medal – first place	2010 Vancouver	Team competition

Canada Cup
Gold medal – first place	2008	Team competition
Gold medal – first place	2012	Team competition

American Zonals
Gold medal – first place	2009	Team competition

Chance Sumner (born 1977) is an American Paralympic wheelchair rugby player from Colorado Springs, Colorado. In 2005 he won his first gold medal at the 2005 World Wheelchair & Amputee Games and two years later was qualified as USQRA National champion. He is a 2009 American Zonals gold medalist and won it again at both 2008 and 2010 Canada Cups as well. He also won gold at the 2008 Summer Paralympics and bronze at the 2012 Summer Paralympics.
