= Nicholas Springer =

American wheelchair rugby player (1985–2021)

Personal information
- Nickname: Nick Springer
- Born: June 9, 1985 New York, New York, U.S.
- Died: April 14, 2021 (aged 35) Chandler, Arizona, U.S.
- Education: Eckerd College
- Occupation: Communications
- Height: 4 ft 1 in (124 cm)

Sport
- Country: America
- Sport: Wheelchair rugby
- Position: 2.0
- Team: United States National Wheelchair Rugby Team
- Coached by: Victor Calise
Medal record
Men's Wheelchair rugby
Representing United States
Canada Cup
Gold medal – first place	2008	Men's wheelchair rugby
North American Cup
Silver medal – second place	2008	Men's wheelchair rugby
Paralympic Games
Gold medal – first place	2008 Beijing	Men's wheelchair rugby
Bronze medal – third place	2012 London	Men's wheelchair rugby
World Championships
Gold medal – first place	2006 Christchurch	Men's wheelchair rugby
Gold medal – first place	2010 Vancouver	Men's wheelchair rugby
- Updated on 17 April 2015

Nicholas Springer (June 9, 1985 – April 14, 2021) was an American Paralympic wheelchair rugby player and a four-time national champion, and gold medalist from New York, New York. In 2006 and 2010, he was awarded a gold medal for his participation at the World championships and in 2008 he won Canada Cup and got another gold that way. The same year Springer won a silver medal for his participation at the North American Cup and won a gold medal at the 2008 Paralympic Games in Beijing, China. In 2012 he won his first bronze medal at the 2012 Summer Paralympics in London. Besides rugby, he played hockey for 14 years. He was also an avid traveler and enjoyed outdoor activities and scuba diving. Springer died suddenly in 2021 at the age of 35 while swimming at a friend's house.
