= David Willsie =

Canadian wheelchair rugby player

- Born: March 28, 1968 (age 58) Dorchester, Ontario, Canada

Rugby union career
Senior career
Years	Team	Apps	(Points)
1997	London Annihilators		
Medal record
Men's wheelchair rugby
Representing Canada
Paralympic Games
Silver medal – second place	2004 Athens	Team competition
Bronze medal – third place	2008 Beijing	Team competition
Silver medal – second place	2012 London	Team competition

David Willsie (born March 28, 1968) is a Canadian coach and former Wheelchair rugby player. As a member of the Canadian national wheelchair rugby team, he won a silver medal at the 2004 Summer Paralympics, a bronze medal at the 2008 Summer Paralympics, and another silver at the 2012 Summer Paralympics.

== Early life ==
Willsie was born on March 28, 1968, in Dorchester, Ontario, Canada to parents John and Jean. His father was an international ice hockey referee, and his cousin Brian Willsie played in the National Hockey League. Willsie was born and raised in London, Ontario, and earned a marketing diploma from Fanshawe College.

Willsie was a semi-pro baseball player and a cross-country runner before being left quadriplegic following a recreational hockey game in 1995. While recovering in the hospital, Willsie was recruited by a local coach from Strathroy to play para-rugby. At the time, he was not interested in wheelchair sports because he felt they were more of a "consolation" sport. However, after visiting a local wheelchair rugby group and seeing their intensity, he pursued the sport. Following this, he started playing wheelchair rugby with the London Annihilators in 1997 and made the Ontario team in 1998. He officially joined the Canadian National Wheelchair Rugby team in 1999.

== Career ==
Upon qualifying for the Canadian National Wheelchair Rugby team, Willsie made his Paralympic Games debut in 2000. The team came fourth, the first international showing where the team did not medal. During the competition, he served as co-captain. He remained as captain for the 2004 Summer Paralympics, where he won a silver medal. The teams' experience during the Games was captured in the documentary Murderball, which was nominated for the Academy Award for Best Documentary Feature. Willsie returned to Team Canada for the 2008 Summer Paralympics, where he helped them win a bronze medal.

As a result of his athletic achievements, Willsie's hometown recreation centre included a purpose-built training facility used by Willsie and his team. After winning another silver medal at the 2012 Summer Paralympics, Willsie was the recipient of the Queen Elizabeth II Diamond Jubilee Medal. After Canada failed to medal in the 2016 Summer Paralympics, Willsie retired from competing but accepted an assistant coaching position with the national team. In 2017, Willsie and Garett Hickling became the first-ever rugby players to have their jerseys retired by the Canadian Wheelchair Sports Association.
