= Will Groulx =

American wheelchair rugby player

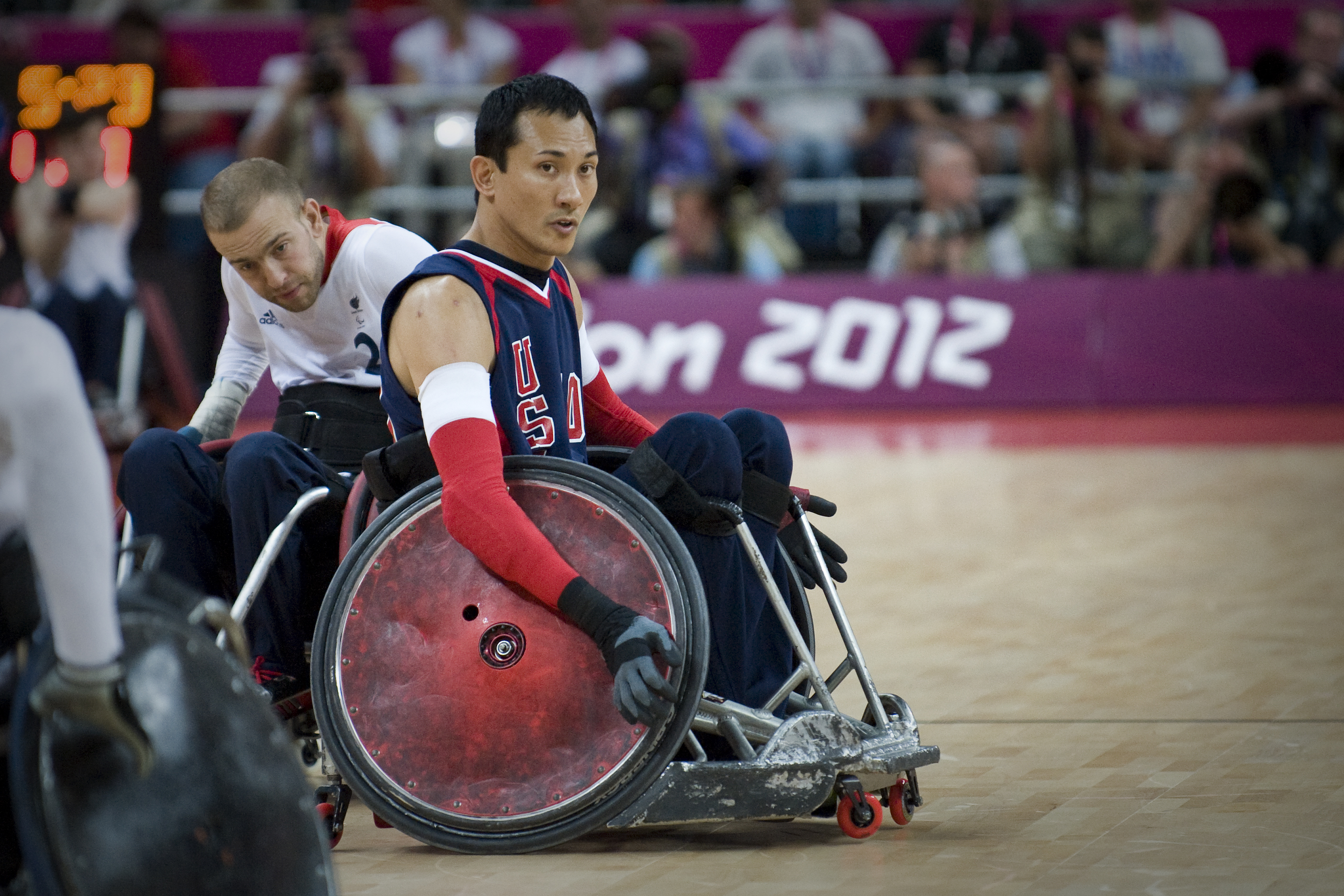

Personal information
- Born: March 11, 1974 (age 52)

Sport
- Country: United States
- Sport: Wheelchair rugby, Para-cycling
- Club: Portland Pounders
- Team: United States
Medal record
Representing United States
Wheelchair rugby
Paralympic Games
Gold medal – first place	2008 Beijing	Mixed team
Bronze medal – third place	2004 Athens	Mixed team
Bronze medal – third place	2012 London	Mixed team
World Championship
Gold medal – first place	2010 Vancouver	Mixed team
Gold medal – first place	2006 Christchurch	Mixed team
Para-cycling
Paralympic Games
Gold medal – first place	2016 Rio	Road race H2
Silver medal – second place	2016 Rio	Road time trial H2
Silver medal – second place	2016 Rio	Mixed team relay H2-5
Parapan American Games
Gold medal – first place	2015 Toronto	Mixed road race H1-2
Silver medal – second place	2015 Toronto	Mixed time trial H1-5

William Groulx (born March 11, 1974) is an American wheelchair rugby player and cycler, and a member of the United States wheelchair rugby team.

He was part of the US team that took the gold medal at the 2008 Paralympic Games in Beijing, and a bronze medal in Athens in 2004. He won three medals for cycling in the 2016 Paralympics.

He served in the United States Navy from 1995 to 2001.

In 2001, he had a spinal cord injury after a motorcycle accident.

He was nominated for an ESPY Award in 2009, in the category Best Male Athlete with a Disability.

He is a member of the Paralyzed Veterans of America.
