= Seth McBride =

American wheelchair rugby player

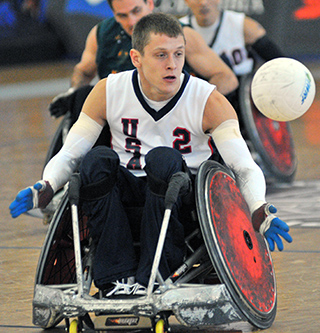
- McBride in 2010
- Born: 1983 (age 41–42); Seattle, Washington, U.S.
- Height: 6 ft in (178 cm)

Medal record

Men's wheelchair rugby

Representing the United States

Paralympic Games
Gold medal – first place	2008 Beijing	Team competition
Bronze medal – third place	2012 London	Team competition

World Championships
Gold medal – first place	2006 Christchurch	Team competition
Gold medal – first place	2010 Vancouver	Team competition

North American Cup
Gold medal – first place	2006	Team competition
Silver medal – second place	2008	Team competition

Canada Cup
Gold medal – first place	2006	Team competition
Gold medal – first place	2008	Team competition

Seth McBride (born 1983) is an American Paralympic wheelchair rugby player and five-time gold medalist from Seattle, Washington.

== Early life ==
Born in Juneau, Alaska, McBride graduated from Juneau-Douglas High School in 2001. During the same year he got into a skiing accident which left him paralyzed and with two broken vertebrates in his neck. After his accident he began to attend the University of Oregon from which he got a degree in international studies in 2005.

== Career ==
The same year he participated at the Tribute to Peace World Wheelchair and Amputee Games in Rio de Janeiro and since then and until 2006 has won numerous of gold medals at the IWAS World Games, North American and Canada Cups and also at the world championships. However, at the 2008 North American Cup he won silver. But that didn't stop him from winning gold and by 2010 he earned three more. In 2012 he won his first bronze medal at the 2012 Summer Paralympics in London during which he and his team scored 64–48 against Japan's Daisuke Ikesake.

== Personal life ==
In his spare time he plays harmonica, rides a bike and travels to El Salvador where he teaches English. Currently he attends Portland State University where he pursuing master's degree in non-fiction writing.
