= Scott Hogsett =

American wheelchair rugby player

- Born: 1972 (age 53–54) Spokane, Washington, U.S.
- Height: 6 ft 1 in (1.85 m)

Rugby union career
International career
Years	Team	Apps	(Points)
–	USA		
Medal record
Men's wheelchair rugby
Representing the United States
Paralympic Games
Bronze medal – third place	2004 Athens	Team competition
Gold medal – first place	2008 Beijing	Team competition
Bronze medal – third place	2012 London	Team competition
World Championships
Gold medal – first place	2006 Christchurch	Team competition
Gold medal – first place	2010 Vancouver	Team competition
North American Cup
Silver medal – second place	2008	Team competition
Canada Cup
Gold medal – first place	2008	Team competition

Scott Hogsett (born 1972) is an American Paralympic wheelchair rugby player from Spokane, Washington who was a world championship gold medalist in 2006 and 2010 respectively. In 2008, he was awarded with another gold medal at the Canada Cup and the same year won it again at the 2008 Summer Paralympics. In 2004 and 2012 Paralympic Games he won two bronze medals following by a silver one at the North American Cup in 2008.
