= 2026 Wheelchair Rugby World Championship =

International wheelchair rugby competition

Tournament information
- Sport: Wheelchair rugby
- Location: São Paulo, Brazil
- Date: 17–23 August 2026
- Administrator: World Wheelchair Rugby

Final positions
- Champions: United States
- Runner-up: Australia
- 3rd place: Japan

Tournament statistics
- Matches played: 44

The 2026 Wheelchair Rugby World Championship was the 9th international championship for wheelchair rugby. It was held at the national Paralympic Training Centre in São Paulo, Brazil from 17 to 23 August 2026 and contested by the world's top twelve national teams. The tournament was won by United States, defeating Australia in the final by 57–51 to claim their first title in 16 years.

== Tournament ==
Twelve teams contested the 2026 Wheelchair Rugby World Championship. The preliminary rounds consisted of a group stage where the teams were split into two leagues which were contested as a round-robin. This was then followed by a round of crossover matches that determined the semi-finalists.

=== Preliminary round ===
==== Pool A ====
Team	Pld	W	D	L	GF	GA	GD	Pts
Australia	5	5	0	0	285	193	+92	10
United States	5	4	0	1	260	220	+40	8
Canada	5	2	0	3	212	228	-16	4
Netherlands	5	2	0	3	213	248	-35	4
Brazil	5	2	0	3	242	257	-15	4
New Zealand	5	0	0	5	191	257	-66	0

==== Pool B ====
Team	Pld	W	D	L	GF	GA	GD	Pts
Japan	5	5	0	0	289	222	+67	10
(United Kingdom) Great Britain	5	4	0	1	269	246	+23	8
France	5	3	0	2	248	240	+8	6
Denmark	5	2	0	3	273	263	+10	4
Germany	5	1	0	4	236	267	-31	2
Colombia	5	0	0	5	211	288	-77	0

=== Classification rounds ===
==== 9th - 12th places ====
Classification round
21 August 2026
New Zealand	42
Germany	44
21 August 2026
Brazil	45
Colombia	52

Ninth place
22 August 2026
Colombia	37
Germany	65
Eleventh place
22 August 2026
Brazil	53
New Zealand	37

==== 5th - 8th places ====
Classification round
22 August 2026
Denmark	51
Canada	50
22 August 2026
Netherlands	48
France	55

Fifth place
23 August 2026
Denmark	55
France	62
Seventh place
23 August 2026
Canada	48
Netherlands	43

=== Medals round ===
Quarter-finals
14 August 2026
Japan	58
Netherlands	44
14 August 2026
Canada	51
Great Britain	54
14 August 2026
Australia	59
Denmark	47
14 August 2026
France	42
United States	53

Semi-finals
22 August 2026
Japan	49
United States	50
22 August 2026
Australia	60
Great Britain	44

Gold medal match
23 August 2026
Australia	51
United States	57
Bronze medal match
23 August 2026
Great Britain	47
Japan	54
