= Andrew Harrison (wheelchair rugby) =

Australian wheelchair rugby player

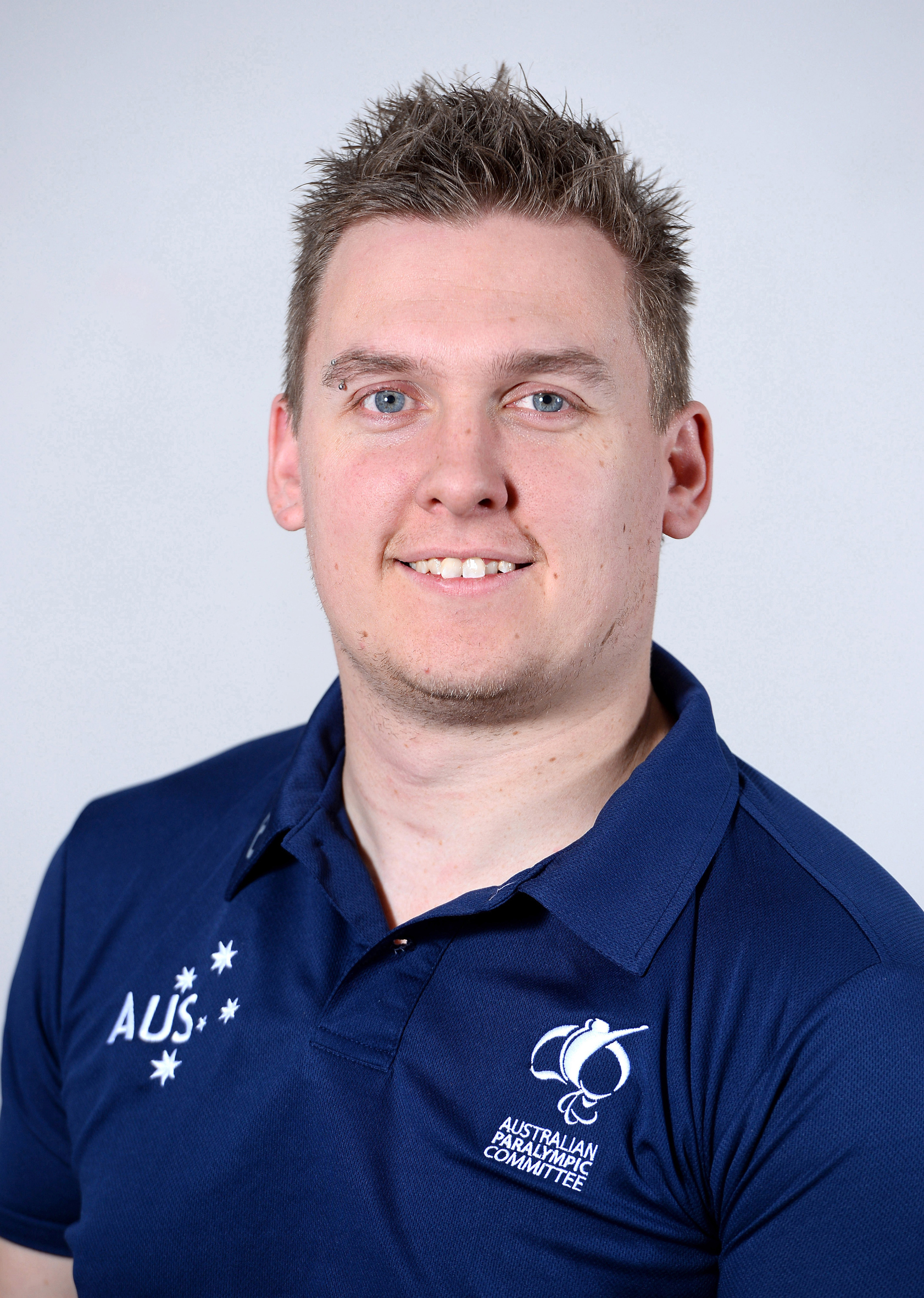
- 2016 Australian Paralympic team portrait of Harrison

Personal information
- Nationality: Australian
- Born: 7 June 1987 (age 39)

Sport
- Country: Australia
- Sport: Wheelchair rugby
- Disability class: 2.0
- Event: Team
- Team: Victorian Thunder
Medal record
Wheelchair rugby
Paralympic Games
Gold medal – first place	2012 London	Mixed
Gold medal – first place	2016 Rio	Mixed
World Championships
Silver medal – second place	2010 Vancouver	Mixed
Silver medal – second place	2018 Sydney	Mixed

Andrew Harrison, OAM (born 7 June 1987) is a wheelchair rugby player. He has won gold medals at the 2012 London and 2016 Rio Paralympics. and competed at the 2020 Summer Paralympics.

== Personal ==
Andrew John Harrison was born on 7 June 1987 in Bayswater North, Victoria. At the age of seventeen, he became a quadriplegic as a result of a 2004 diving accident when he jumped head first into a shallow river. He spent time recovering and undergoing physical therapy at Kew's Royal Talbot Rehabilitation Centre. His accident is one of the reasons he was part of a campaign called "Don’t Drink and Dive" which encouraged people to be careful when diving. His hobbies include four-wheelers, cars and off-road buggies, which he can drive despite his injuries. As of 2021, he lives in Bayswater North, Victoria, is a student and works as a Spinchat Coordinator. He is married to Lisa and they have a son Jack who was born on 1 January 2015.

== Wheelchair rugby ==
Harrison is a 2.0 point wheelchair rugby player. As of 2012, he has a scholarship with the Victorian Institute of Sport.

While Harrison was rehabilitating following his accident, he was visited by a member of the national wheelchair rugby team who encouraged him to try the sport. He made his first Victorian state representative team in 2006, not long after his accident. That year, his Victorian side finished third in the National Wheelchair Rugby League and he was named the rookie of the year. In 2009, he played for the West Coast Enforcers and finished the season being named to the league's all star four. He changed teams and played for Victorian Thunder in 2010, and was again named to the league's all star four. He was with the Victorian side again in 2012.

The first time Harrison was invited to a national team training camp was in 2007. He then went on to play in an international match against the New Zealand national wheelchair rugby team that year at the Oceania Regional Championships. While he was considered for the 2008 Summer Paralympics, he was ultimately not selected. Following this brief appearance, he did not make the national team again until 2010 when he was a member of the team at the Four Nations Tournament. That year, he was also a member of the Australian team that competed at the World Championships. Wearing jersey number 15, he represented Australia at the 2012 Canada Cup. In May 2012, he participated in a test series against Japan in Sydney. He scored four goals in the fourth game which Australia won 47 – 44, and two goals in the fifth game where Australia won 61 – 55. He was selected to represent Australia at the 2012 Summer Paralympics in wheelchair rugby. Going into London, his team was ranked second in the world behind the United States. He was part of the team that won the gold medal. The Australian team went through the five-day tournament undefeated.

He was a member of the team that retained its gold medal at the 2016 Rio Paralympics after defeating the United States 59–58 in the final.

At the 2018 IWRF World Championship in Sydney, Australia, he was a member of the Australian team that won the silver medal after being defeated by Japan 61–62 in the gold medal game.

In 2020, he is the captain of the Power House Wheelchair Rugby Club in Victoria.

At the 2020 Summer Paralympics, the Steelers finished fourth after being defeated by Japan 52–60 in the bronze medal game. COVID travel restrictions led to Steelers not having a team training since March 2020 prior to Tokyo.

He was awarded an Order of Australia Medal in the 2014 Australia Day Honours "for service to sport as a Gold Medallist at the London 2012 Paralympic Games."
