= Josh Hose =

Australian wheelchair rugby player (born 1986)

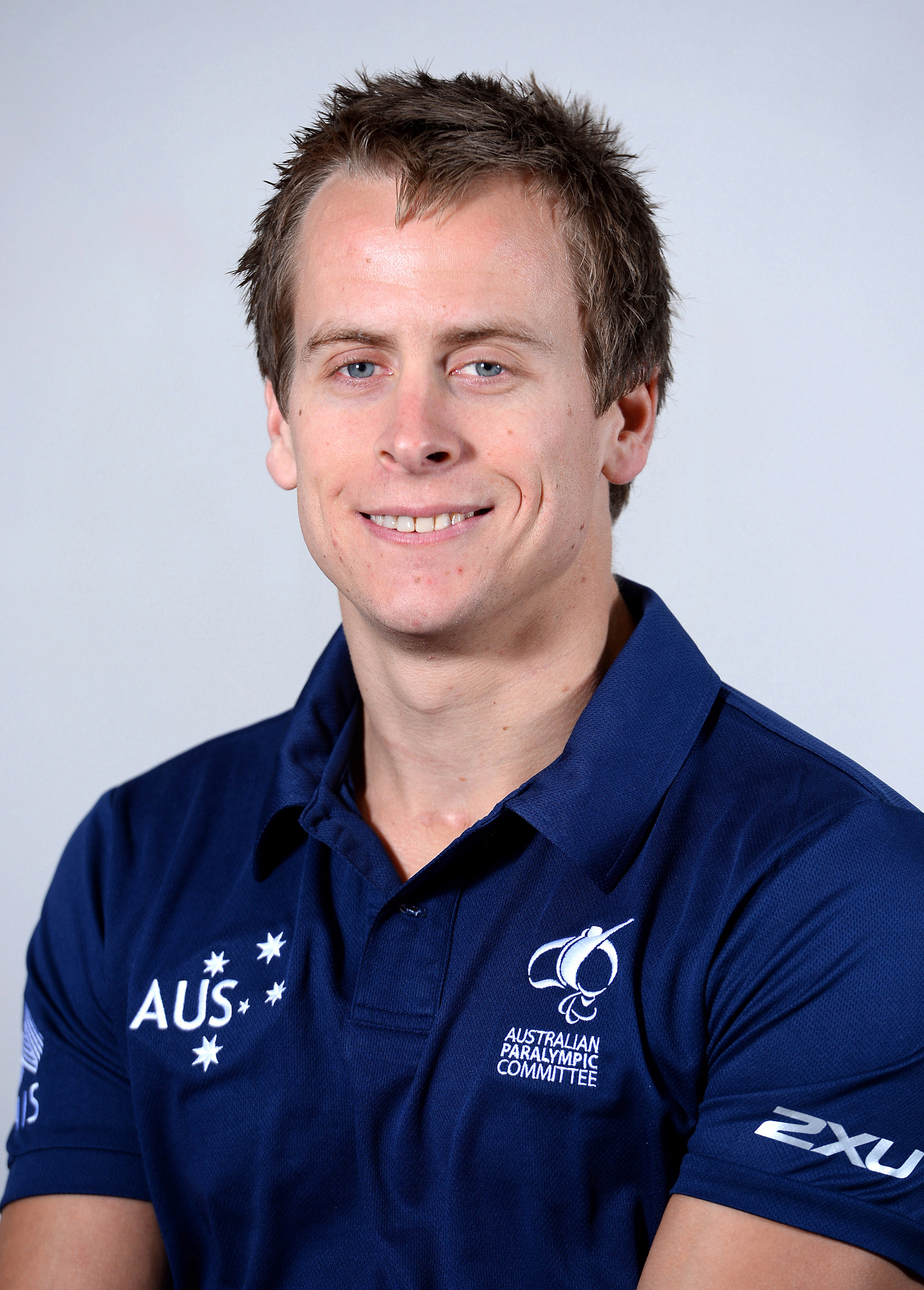
- 2016 Australian Paralympic team portrait of Hose

Personal information
- Nationality: Australian
- Born: 1 December 1986 (age 39) Camperdown, Victoria

Sport
- Country: Australia
- Sport: Wheelchair rugby
- Disability class: 3.0
- Event: Team
- Club: Wheelchair Sports Australia
- Team: Victorian Thunder
Medal record
Paralympic Games
Gold medal – first place	2012 London	Mixed
Gold medal – first place	2016 Rio	Mixed
World Championships
Silver medal – second place	2010 Vancouver	Mixed
Gold medal – first place	2014 Odense	Mixed

Joshua Anthony "Josh" Hose, OAM (born 1 December 1986) is a wheelchair rugby player. He has won gold medals at the 2012 London and 2016 Rio Paralympics and competed at the 2020 Summer Paralympics.

== Personal ==
Joshua Anthony Hose was born on 1 December 1986 in Camperdown, Victoria. On 26 January 2005 (Australia Day), he was involved in a car accident that left him a C6 – C7 Paraplegic; he dislocated a vertebra when the roof of his car collapsed after a rollover. He ended up spending two weeks in a medically induced coma during his recovery. His subsequent paralysis is from the waist down. Growing up, he played cricket, football and basketball. He moved to Melbourne in mid-2008, He attended Victoria University where he completed Certificate IV in Disability Studies. and works as a motivational speaker. In 2021, he is a Peer Support Project Officer with AQA Victoria Ltd.

== Wheelchair rugby ==
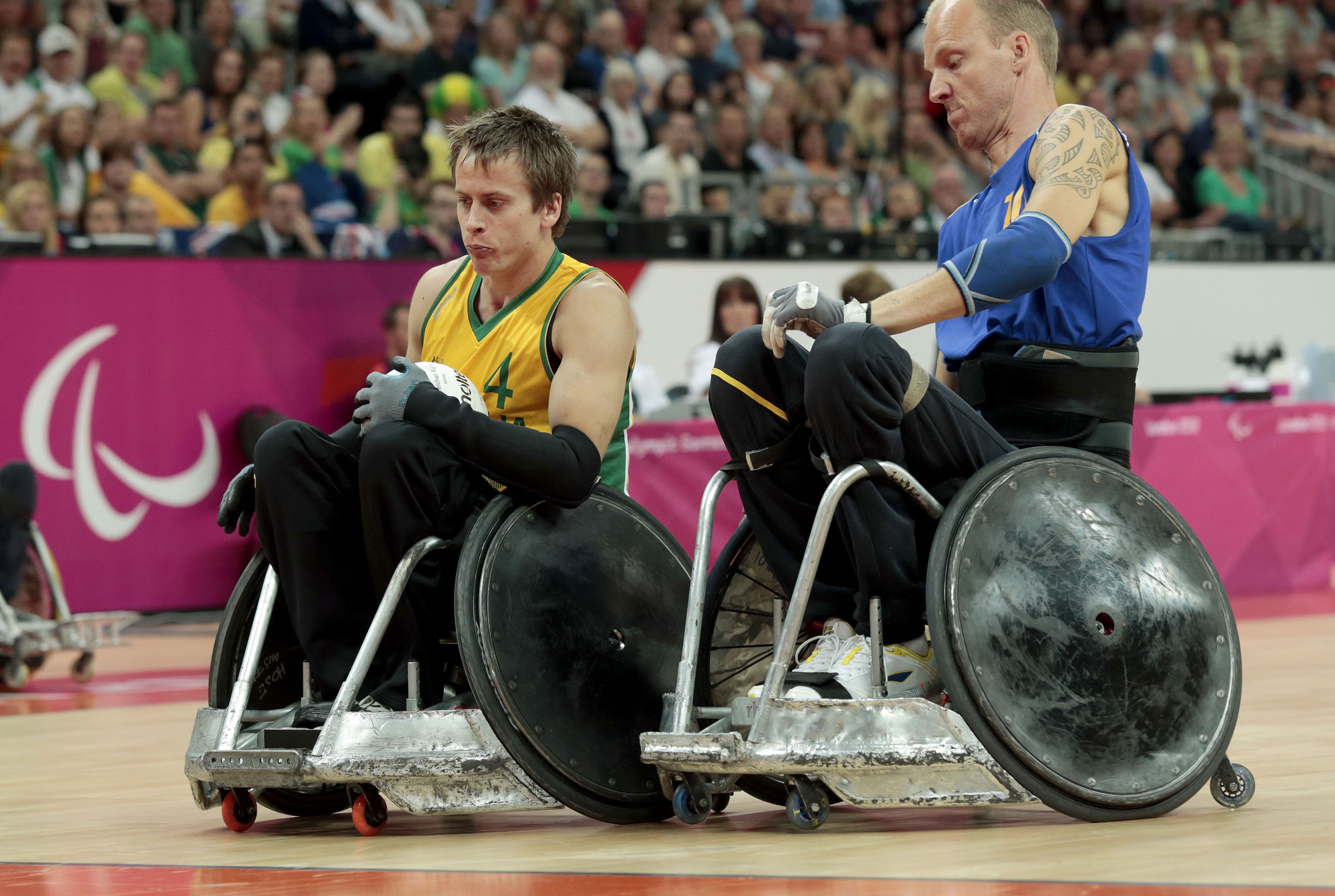
Hose at the 2012 London Paralympics

Hose is a 3.0 point wheelchair rugby player. He is a member of Wheelchair Sports Australia, the Victoria state wheelchair rugby team, and plays for the Victorian Thunder in the National Wheelchair Rugby League. As of 2012, he has a scholarship with the Victorian Institute of Sport and was also supported by Victoria's Disability Sport and Recreation. He trains at the Victorian Institute of Sport and in the cities of Kew, Caroline Springs and Box Hill.

Hose watched the 2008 Summer Paralympics wheelchair rugby matches and some local games, and it inspired him to take up the sport after seeing an opportunity to play while rehabbing in Victoria.

=== National team ===
Hose made his national team debut in 2009 at the Asia Oceania championships, after being selected for the team in May. He played in the 2010 World Championships where Australia finished second. That year, he also represented Australia at the 4 Nations event and the Canada Cup. In 2011, Hose was regularly flying between Brisbane and Melbourne to train with the national team in Brisbane.

Hose trained with the national team in 2012 at the Royal Talbot Rehabilitation Centre. In May 2012, he participated in a test series against Japan in Sydney. He was part of the Australian team at the 2012 Canada Cup. His team finished first at the London hosted 2012 Paralympic Test Event. He was selected to represent Australia at the 2012 Summer Paralympics in wheelchair rugby in May 2012 before the start of the Opening Ceremony of the International Wheelchair Rugby Test Series. The Games were his first. Going into London, his team was ranked second in the world behind the United States. He was part of the team that won the gold medal. The Australian team went through the five-day tournament undefeated. He was a member of the Australian team that won its first world championship gold medal at the 2014 World Wheelchair Rugby Championships at Odense, Denmark. .

He was a member of the team that retained its gold medal at the 2016 Rio Paralympics after defeating the United States 59–58 in the final.

At the 2020 Summer Paralympics, the Steelers finished fourth after being defeated by Japan 52–60 in the bronze medal game.COVID travel restrictions led to Steelers not having a team training since March 2020 prior to Tokyo.

He was awarded an Order of Australia Medal in the 2014 Australia Day Honours "for service to sport as a Gold Medallist at the London 2012 Paralympic Games."

Hose announced his retirement from the Steelers in November 2021.
