= Wheelchair rugby at the 2015 Parapan American Games =

The wheelchair rugby event at the 2015 Parapan American Games was run from 8–14 August 2015 at the Mississauga Sports Centre in Mississauga. Six countries contested the gold medal which was won by the host nation, Canada. Despite being a mixed gender sport, Colombia were the only team to field a female athlete. This was the first time wheelchair rugby had been contested at the Parapan American Games.

The event was contested as a round robin competition in its first stage, with the first placed team playing the fourth and the second placed team playing the third in the semi-finals. The losing semi-finalists faced each other for the bronze medal.

== Medal summary ==
=== Medal table ===
Rank	Nation	Gold	Silver	Bronze	Total
1	Canada (CAN)	1	0	0	1
2	United States (USA)	0	1	0	1
3	Colombia (COL)	0	0	1	1
Totals (3 entries)		1	1	1	3

== Medal event ==
=== First round ===
==== Day 1 ====
August 8, 2015
17:00

Canada	65 – 32	Brazil

Mississauga Sports Centre
August 8, 2015
19:15

United States	70 – 25	Argentina

Mississauga Sports Centre
August 8, 2015
21:30

Colombia	66 – 12	Chile

Mississauga Sports Centre

==== Day 2 ====
August 9, 2015
17:00

Canada	76 – 32	Colombia

Mississauga Sports Centre
August 9, 2015
19:15

Argentina	53 – 14	Chile

Mississauga Sports Centre
August 9, 2015
21:30

United States	62 – 27	Brazil

Mississauga Sports Centre

==== Day 3 ====
August 10, 2015
17:00

Canada	63 – 37	Argentina

Mississauga Sports Centre
August 10, 2015
19:15

United States	54 – 11	Chile

Mississauga Sports Centre
August 10, 2015
21:30

Brazil	53 – 41	Colombia

Mississauga Sports Centre

==== Day 4 ====
August 11, 2015
15:30

Brazil	63 – 37	Argentina

Mississauga Sports Centre
August 11, 2015
17:45

Canada	67 – 11	Chile

Mississauga Sports Centre
August 11, 2015
20:00

United States	71 – 25	Colombia

Mississauga Sports Centre

==== Day 5 ====
August 12, 2015
15:30

Brazil	45 – 6	Chile

Mississauga Sports Centre
August 12, 2015
17:45

Argentina	36 – 51	Colombia

Mississauga Sports Centre
August 12, 2015
20:00

Canada	59 – 60	United States

Mississauga Sports Centre

=== First round table ===
Team	Pld	W	D	L	GF	GA	GD	Pts
United States	5	0	0	0	317	147	+170	15
Canada	4	1	0	0	330	172	+158	12
Brazil	3	2	0	0	220	211	+9	9
Colombia	2	3	0	0	215	248	-33	6
Argentina	1	4	0	0	188	261	-73	3
Chile	0	5	0	0	54	285	-231	0

=== Medal round ===
Bracket

Semifinals
August 13, 2015 - 17:45
Canada	62
Brazil	35
August 13, 2015 - 20:00
Colombia	28
United States	65

Gold medal match
August 14, 2012 - 21:00
Canada	57
United States	54
Bronze medal match
August 14, 2012 - 18:30
Colombia	50
Brazil	48
