= Wheelchair rugby at the 2008 Summer Paralympics =

Wheelchair rugby at the XIII Paralympic Games
- Paralympic Wheelchair rugby
- Venue: Beijing Science and Technology University Gymnasium
- Dates: 12–16 September 2008

Medalists
1st place, gold medalist(s)		United States	United States
2nd place, silver medalist(s)		Australia	Australia
3rd place, bronze medalist(s)		Canada	Canada

Wheelchair rugby at the 2008 Summer Paralympics was held in the Beijing Science and Technology University Gymnasium from 12 September to 16 September.

== Medalists ==
Event	Gold	Silver	Bronze
Mixed team	United States (USA) Andy Cohn; Will Groulx; Scott Hogsett; Bryan Kirkland (captain); Norm Lyduch; Seth McBride; Jason Regier; Nick Springer; Chance Sumner; Joel Wilmoth; Mark Zupan; Coach: James Gumbert	Australia (AUS) Bryce Alman; Ryley Batt; Grant Boxall; Shane Brand; Cameron Carr; Nazim Erdem; George Hucks; Steve Porter (captain); Ryan Scott; Greg Smith; Scott Vitale; Coach: Brad Dubberley	Canada (CAN) Ian Chan; Jason Crone; Jared Funk; Garett Hickling; Trevor Hirschfield; Fabien Lavoie; Say Luangkhamdeng; Daniel Paradis; Erika Schmutz; Patrice Simard; Mike Whitehead; David Willsie (captain); Coach: Benoit Labrecque

== Classification ==
Wheelchair rugby players were given a classification based on their upper body function. A committee gave each athlete a 7-level score ranging from 0.5 to 3.5, with lower scores corresponding to more severe disability. During the game, the total score of all players on the court for a team cannot exceed 8 points. However, for each female player on court, their team gets an extra 0.5 points over the 8 point limit.

== Teams ==
Eight teams took part in this sport. Each team could have up to 12 athletes, but no more than 11 of the team members could be male. Listed below are the eight teams and their method of qualifying for the Beijing Paralympics.

Team	Qualification
Australia (AUS)	Oceania Zonal Championship
Canada (CAN)	American Zonal Championship
China (CHN)	Host nation
Germany (GER)	Europe Zonal Championship
Great Britain (GBR)	Europe Zonal Championship
Japan (JPN)	World Ranking
New Zealand (NZL)	World Ranking
United States (USA)	2006 World Wheelchair Rugby Championships

== Tournament ==
=== Competition format ===
The eight teams were divided into two even groups and participated in a single round robin tournament. The top two teams from each group went on to compete for 1st through 4th place, while the last two teams from each group competed for 5th through 8th place.

=== Preliminary round ===
Group A
Rank	Team	Pld	W	L	PF:PA	Pts	USA	CAN	JPN	CHN
1	United States (USA)	3	3	0	146:99	6	x	37:32	44:37	65:30
2	Canada (CAN)	3	2	1	137:102	5	32:37	x	48:40	57:25
3	Japan (JPN)	3	1	2	132:130	4	37:44	40:48	x	55:38
4	China (CHN)	3	0	3	93:177	3	30:65	25:57	38:55	x

Group B
Rank	Team	Pld	W	L	PF:PA	Pts	AUS	GBR	NZL	GER
1	Australia (AUS)	3	3	0	129:111	6	x	43:37	39:38	47:36
2	Great Britain (GBR)	3	2	1	115:116	5	37:43	x	39:38	39:35
3	New Zealand (NZL)	3	1	2	116:109	4	38:39	38:39	x	40:31
4	Germany (GER)	3	0	3	102:126	3	36:47	35:39	31:40	x

Qualified for quarterfinals
Eliminated

Source: Paralympic.org

=== Medal round ===
Semifinals
15 September 2008 - 18:00
United States	35
Great Britain	32
15 September 2008 - 20:00
Australia	41
Canada	40

Gold-medal match
16 September 2008 - 20:00
United States	53
Australia	44
Bronze-medal match
16 September 2008 - 18:00
Great Britain	41
Canada	47

Source: Paralympic.org

=== Classification 5-8 ===
Classification round
15 September 2008 - 13:00
Japan	38
Germany	39
15 September 2008 - 15:00
New Zealand	47
China	34

Fifth place
16 September 2008 - 15:00
Germany	25
New Zealand	28
Seventh place
16 September 2008 - 13:00
Japan	58
China	32

Source: Paralympic.org

=== Ranking ===
Place	Team
1st place, gold medalist(s)	United States
2nd place, silver medalist(s)	Australia
3rd place, bronze medalist(s)	Canada
4.	Great Britain
5.	New Zealand
6.	Germany
7.	Japan
8.	China
