= Jason Regier =

American wheelchair rugby player

- Born: 1975 (age 50–51); Denver, Colorado, U.S.
- Height: 5 ft 10 in (178 cm)

Medal record

Men's wheelchair rugby

Representing the United States

Paralympic Games
Gold medal – first place	2008 Beijing	Team competition
Bronze medal – third place	2012 London	Team competition

World Championships
Gold medal – first place	2006 Christchurch	Team competition
Gold medal – first place	2010 Vancouver	Team competition

North American Cup
Gold medal – first place	2006	Team competition
Silver medal – second place	2008	Team competition

Canada Cup
Gold medal – first place	2006	Team competition
Gold medal – first place	2008	Team competition
Gold medal – first place	2012	Team competition

Jason Regier (born 1975) is an American Paralympic wheelchair rugby player and eight-time gold medalist from Denver, Colorado. In 2005, he participated at the IWAS World Games where he won a gold medal and next year won three more at the North American Cup, Canada Cup and World championships. After the 2008 North American Cup where he won silver for the first time, he continued winning gold ever since at various championships until 2012 Summer Paralympics where he won his first bronze. Jason is a member of Sigma Alpha Epsilon as an undergraduate at Oregon State University. He also has a master's degree in business administration and marketing from University of Colorado Denver in 2004.
