= Chad Cohn =

American wheelchair rugby player (born 1983)

- Born: August 12, 1983 (age 41); Tucson, Arizona, U.S.
- Height: 5 ft 10 in (1.78 m)

Medal record

Men's wheelchair rugby

Representing the United States

Paralympic Games
Silver medal – second place	2020 Tokyo	Team competition
Bronze medal – third place	2012 London	Team competition

World Championships
Gold medal – first place	2011	Team competition

American Zonals
Gold medal – first place	2009	Team competition

Chad Cohn (born August 12, 1983) is an American Paralympic wheelchair rugby player from Tucson, Arizona. In 2011 and 2012 he was a National champion and won a gold medal at both the 2009 American Zonals and the 2011 IWRF World Championships. He also won a bronze medal at the 2012 Summer Paralympics and is a student at Pima Community College.
