= 1995 IWRF World Championship =

The 1st Wheelchair Rugby World Championships (ISMWSF) were held in Nottwil, Switzerland.
