= IWRF Americas Championship =

WWR Americas Championship
- Formerly: IWRF Americas Championship
- Sport: Wheelchair rugby
- First season: 2009
- Countries: 8
- Continent: Americas
- Most recent champion: United States (6st title)
- Most titles: United States (6 titles)

The WWR Americas Championship or WWR Americas Zone Championship is the Americas wheelchair rugby championships that take place every two years between national teams of the Americas zone. The Americas Championship is a qualifying tournament for the IWRF World Championships and the Paralympic Games.

Canada participated in the IWRF Asia-Oceania Championship in 2007.

== Summaries ==
Year	Host	Gold medal game			Bronze medal game		
Year	Host	Gold	Score	Silver	Bronze	Score	Fourth place
2009; Details	Argentina (Buenos Aires)	United States	73–26	Canada	Argentina	46–43	Brazil
2011; Details	Colombia (Bogotá)	United States	56–45	Canada	Brazil	69–31	Mexico
2013; Details	United States (Birmingham)	United States	63–40	Canada	Brazil	67–44	Argentina
2017; Details	Paraguay (Asunción)	United States	54–43	Canada	Brazil	48–42	Colombia
2022; Details	Colombia (Medellín)	United States	54–50	Canada	Brazil	54–52	Colombia
2025; Details	Brazil (São Paulo)	United States	65–48	Brazil	Canada	49–48	Colombia

=== Championships per nation ===
Rank	Nation	Gold	Silver	Bronze	Total
1	United States	6	0	0	6
2	Canada	0	5	1	6
3	Brazil	0	1	4	5
4	Argentina	0	0	1	1
Totals (4 entries)		6	6	6	18

== Participation details ==
Team	(Argentina); 2009	(Colombia); 2011	(United States); 2013	(Paraguay); 2017	(Colombia); 2022	(Brazil); 2025	Total
Argentina	3rd	5th	4th	5th	5th	5th	6
Brazil	4th	3rd	3rd	3rd	3rd	2nd	6
Canada	2nd	2nd	2nd	2nd	2nd	3rd	6
Chile	–	–	–	6th	6th	6th	3
Colombia	–	6th	5th	4th	4th	4th	5
Mexico	–	4th	–	–	–	1
Paraguay	–	–	–	7th	–	7th	2
Peru	–	–	–	-	–	8th	1
United States	1st	1st	1st	1st	1st	1st	6

== See also ==
- Wheelchair Rugby World Championships
- IWRF European Championship
- IWRF Asia-Oceania Championship
- American Championships
