= Cody Meakin =

Australian wheelchair rugby player

Cody Meakin OAM
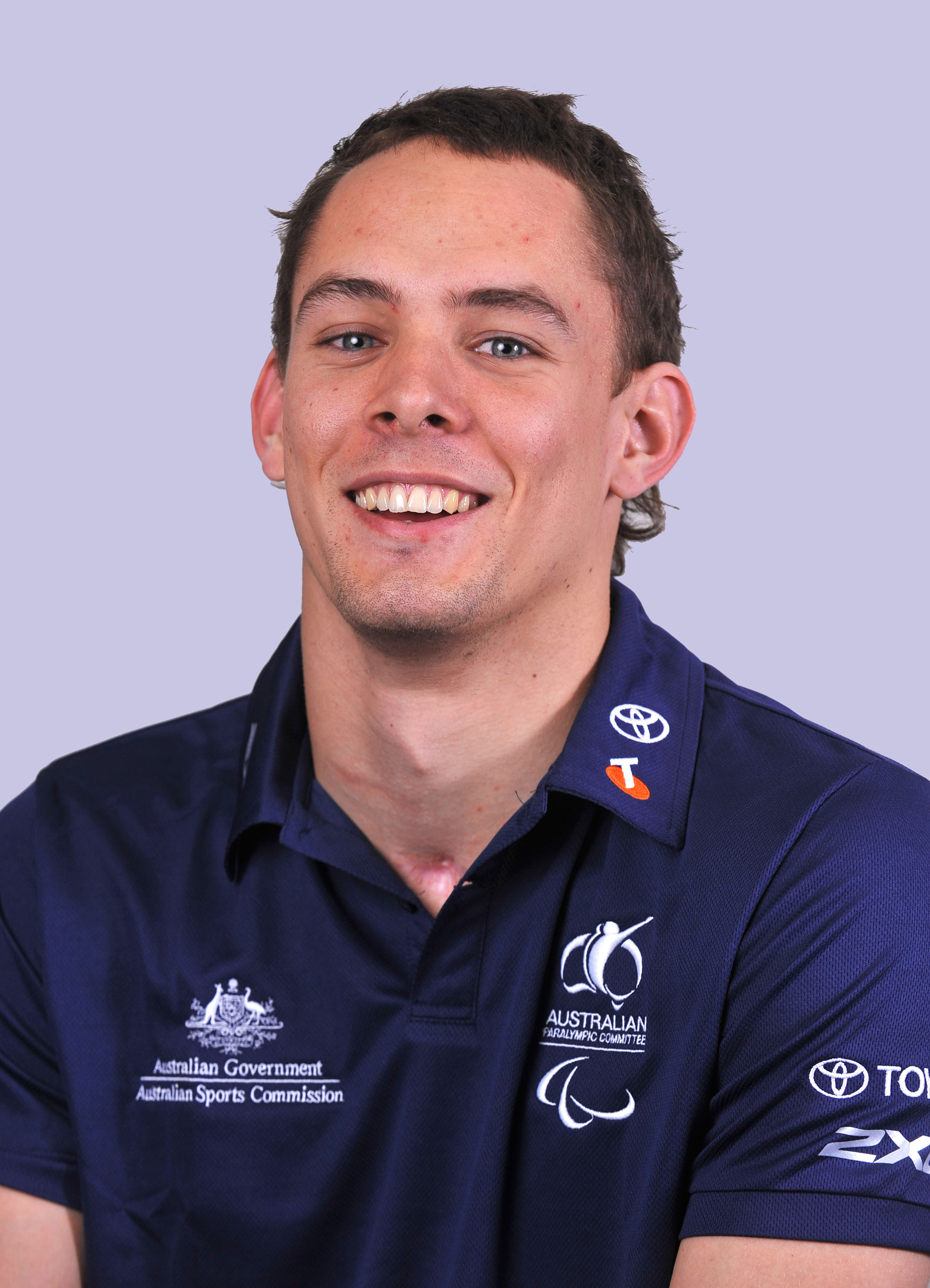
- 2012 Australian Paralympic team portrait of Meakin

Personal information
- Nationality: Australian
- Born: 27 December 1989 (age 36) Darwin, Northern Territory

Sport
- Country: Australia
- Sport: Wheelchair rugby
Medal record
Paralympic Games
Gold medal – first place	2012 London	Mixed

Cody Meakin (born 27 December 1989) is a wheelchair rugby player. He was selected to represent Australia at the 2012 Summer Paralympics in wheelchair rugby.

== Personal ==
Cody Meakin was born on 27 December 1989 in Darwin, Northern Territory. Growing up, he played rugby union for the Casuarina Cougars and Australian rules football with the Waratahs under-14 side. While playing rugby union as part of a tackle during a scrum, he broke his back. In 2008, as a high school student at Canberra Grammar School he was in a car accident in Tennant Creek. In the accident, he damaged his spine leaving him with quadriplegia. In order to receive the best treatment possible for the injury, his parents made the decision to move from Darwin to Adelaide. Most of his high school classmates elected to walk to their year 12 formal in their formal attire, and donated the thousands of Australian dollars they would have otherwise spent on transportation to help defray costs for Meakin's rehabilitation. In 2012, he was living in Brisbane.

== Wheelchair rugby ==
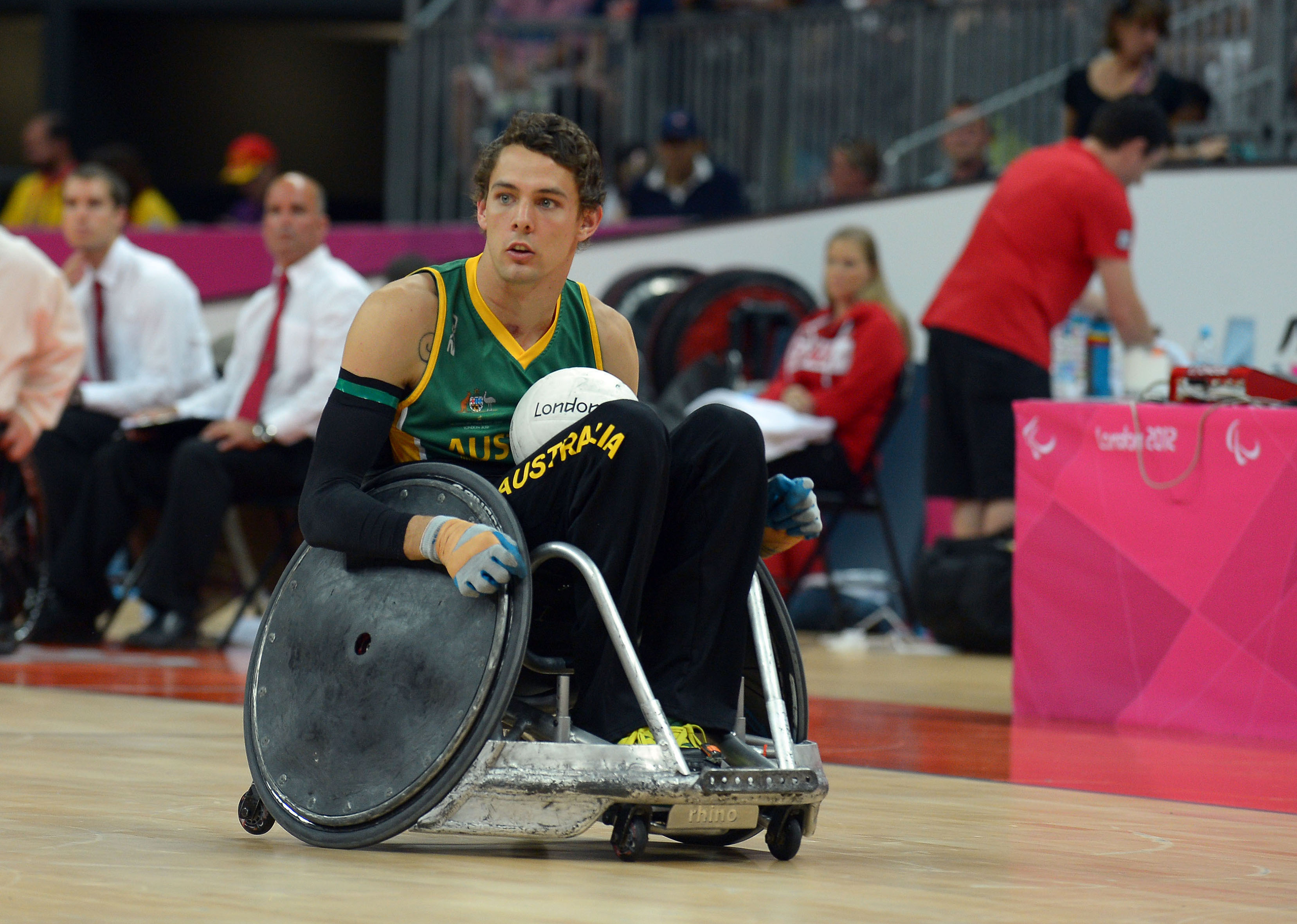
Meakin at the 2012 London Paralympics

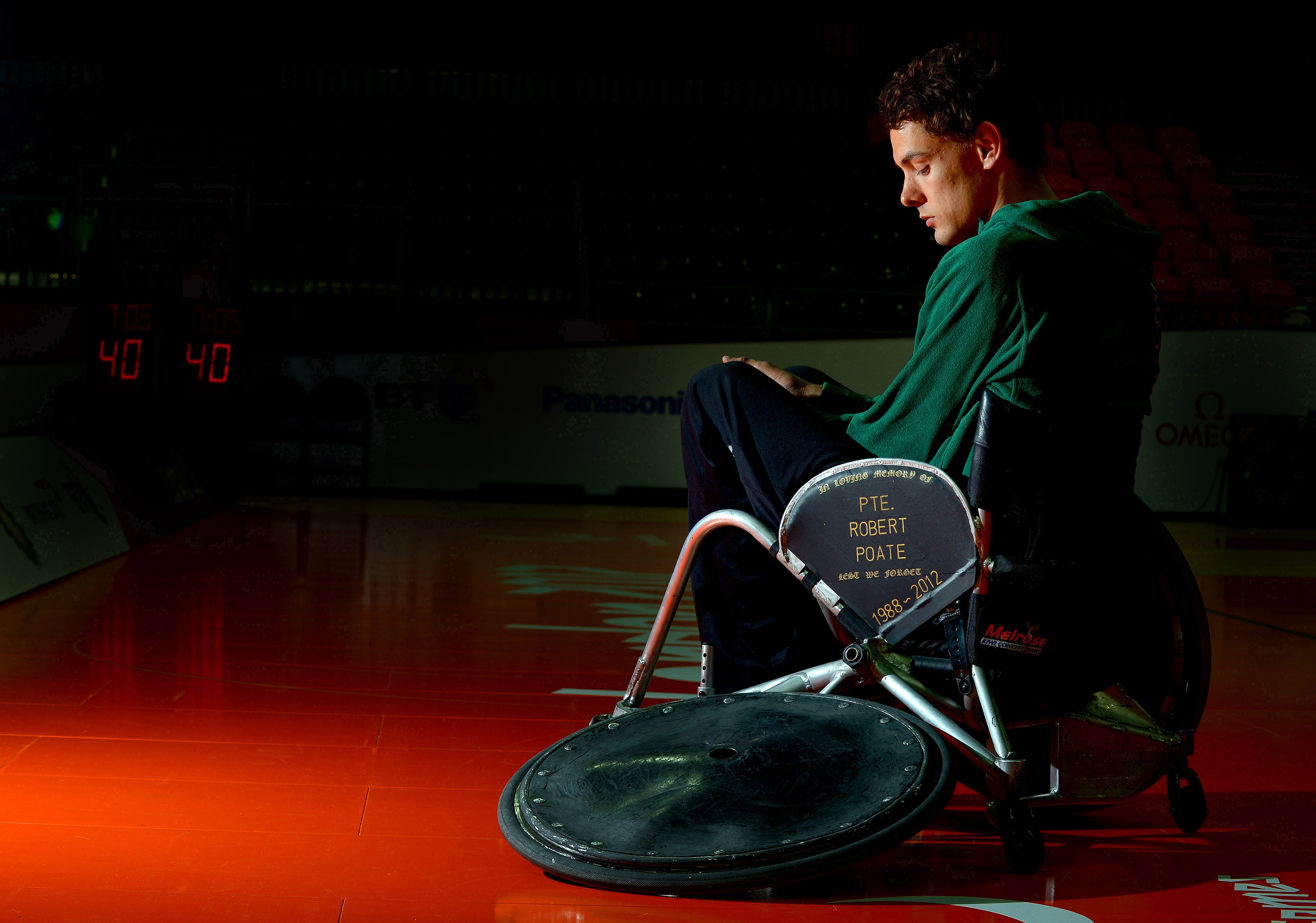
Meakin at the 2012 London Paralympics

Meakin is a 2.5 point wheelchair rugby player who took up wheelchair rugby in 2010 during rehabilitation for his spinal injury.

In 2010, Meakin was a member of Gold Coast Wheelchair Rugby Titans in the National Wheelchair Rugby League, and finished the season by being named the league's best new talent. He was still with the team in 2012.

Meakin played in the Queensland 2011 Wheelchair Rugby State Championships.

Meakin made his Australia national wheelchair rugby team debut in 2011 at the Great Britain Cup. He competed at the 2012 Canada Cup where he wore shirt number 8. In May 2012, he participated in a test series against Japan in Sydney. He was the newest and least experienced member of the Australian national team in the competition. In the fourth game won by Australia with a score of 47 – 44, he scored two goals. He was selected to represent Australia at the 2012 Summer Paralympics in wheelchair rugby. Going into London, his team was ranked second in the world behind the United States. Prior to departing for London, he participated in a national team training camp in Darwin in late July. He was part of the team that won the gold medal. The Australian team went through the five-day tournament undefeated.

He was awarded an Order of Australia Medal in the 2014 Australia Day Honours "for service to sport as a Gold Medallist at the London 2012 Paralympic Games."
