= Ben Newton (wheelchair rugby) =

Australian wheelchair rugby Paralympian

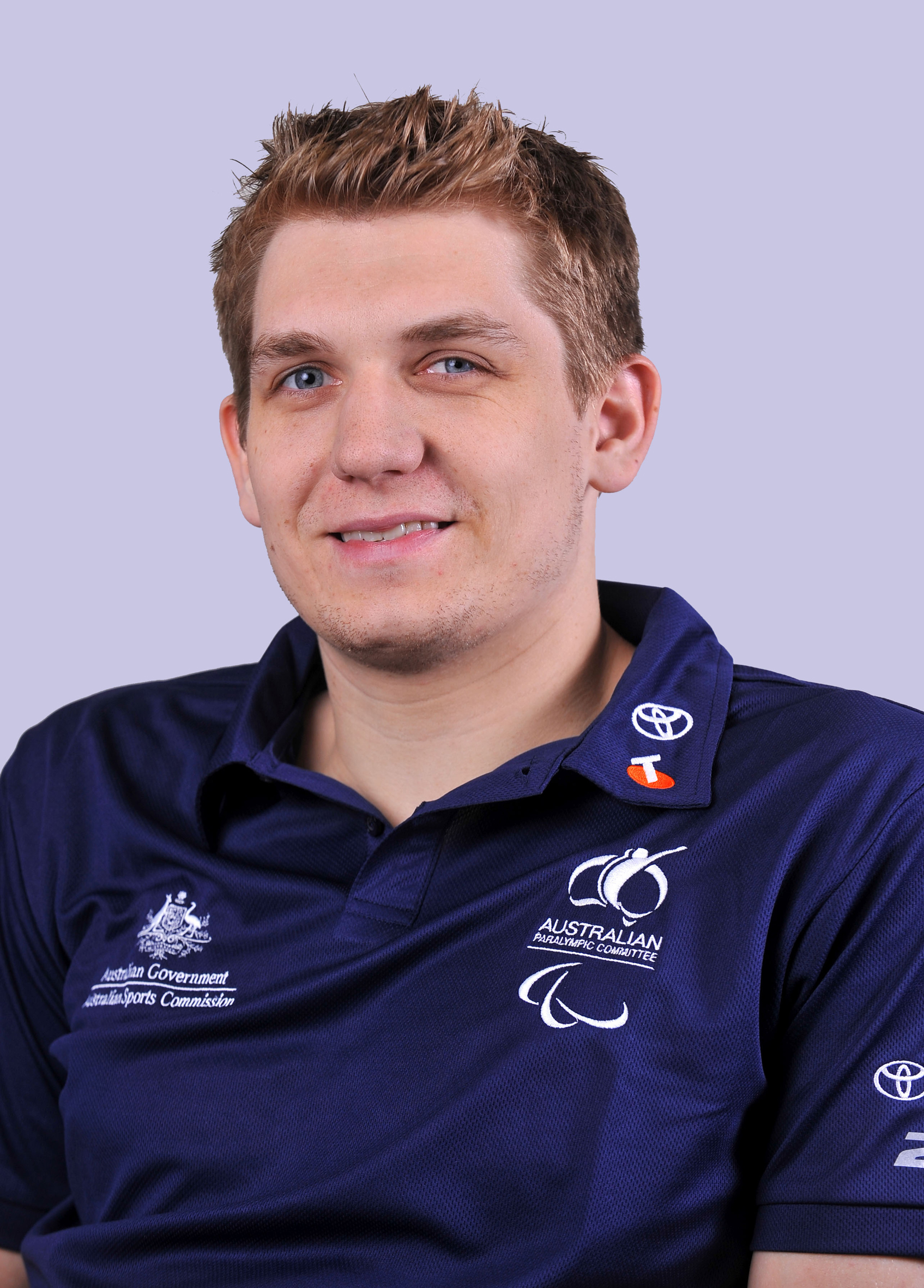
- 2012 Australian Paralympic team portrait of Newton

Personal information
- Full name: Benaiah Newton
- Nationality: Australian
- Born: 14 February 1988 (age 38) Sydney, New South Wales

Sport
- Country: Australia
- Sport: Wheelchair rugby
- Event: Team
- Club: Gold Coast Wheelchair Rugby Titans
- Now coaching: Gold Coast Wheelchair Rugby Titans
Medal record
Wheelchair rugby
Paralympic Games
Gold medal – first place	2012 London	Mixed

Ben Newton, OAM (born 14 February 1988) is a wheelchair rugby player and coach. He represented Australia at the 2012 Summer Paralympics where he was a member of the Steelers that won the gold medal. .

== Personal life ==
Benaiah Thomas Newton was born on 14 February 1988 in Sydney, New South Wales. When he was two and a half years old, he was in a car accident that left him an incomplete quadriplegic. He attended Tyalla Public School and Orara High School, and in 2010 graduated from Southern Cross University with a Bachelor of Psychology with Honours (1st class). During that year, he moved to Brisbane. He was working towards earning a Certificate III and IV in Fitness in 2012, after already having become a qualified psychologist. From 2012 to 2022, he worked in various community engagement and accessibility roles with Queensland Rail.

== Wheelchair rugby ==
=== Playing career ===
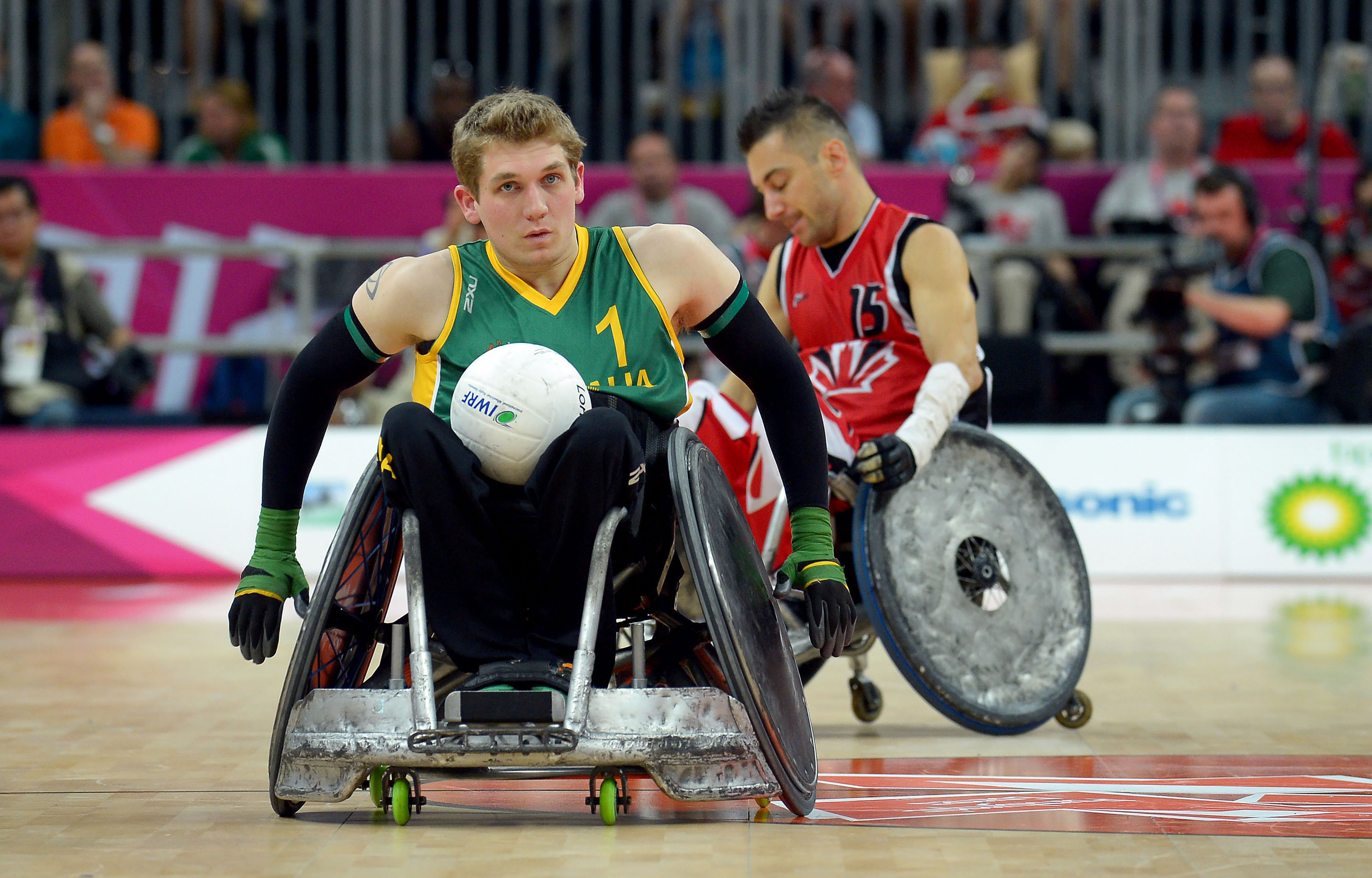
Newton at the 2012 London Paralympics

Newton is a 2.5/3.0-point wheelchair rugby player.

Newton started playing wheelchair rugby in 2004 while he was living in Coffs Harbour after having spent time watching the state representative team compete. Following the 2010 Queensland Wheelchair Rugby State Championships, he was named the competitions most valuable player. In 2010, he was a member of Gold Coast Wheelchair Rugby Titans in the National Wheelchair Rugby League. That season, he was named to the league's All Star Four. He captained the Titans in the 2012 season. He again captained the Suncorp QLD Cyclones in 2013, leading them to their second consecutive Sporting Wheelies and Disabled Association's "Team of the Year" honour.

Newton was first named to the national team in 2010, and made his debut in 2011. As a member of that 2011 team, he played in the GB Cup and Asia Oceania Wheelchair Rugby Championships where his team went undefeated. His team made the finals and qualified for the 2012 Summer Paralympics after defeating the Korea national wheelchair rugby team 63–37. In May 2012, he participated in a test series against Japan in Sydney. He participated in a London Test event, where his team defeated the Great Britain national wheelchair rugby team in the finals after having lost to Great Britain in a pool play earlier in the day. He was selected to represent Australia at the 2012 Summer Paralympics in wheelchair rugby. Going into London, his team is ranked second in the world behind the United States. He was part of the team that won the gold medal. The Australian team went through the five-day tournament undefeated. Newton retired from the national team in 2014.

=== Coaching career ===
Newtom moved into coaching in 2020 becoming head coach of the Queensland Cyclones. In 2022, Newton graduated from the Australian Sports Commission's Gen 2032 coaching program. n 2024, Newton is Queensland Academy of Sport Wheelchair Rugby Program coach, Queensland State Coach and assists with the Australian National Development team.

== Recognition ==
He was awarded an Order of Australia Medal in the 2014 Australia Day Honours "for service to sport as a Gold Medallist at the London 2012 Paralympic Games." In 2024, he was awarded the Queensland Academy of Sport Development Coach of the Cycle.
