= Garett Hickling =

Canadian wheelchair rugby player (1970–2025)

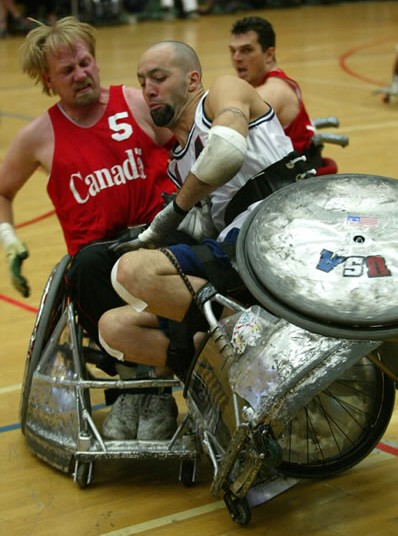
- Hickling (left) and USA's Bryan Kirkland, at a wheelchair rugby game
- Born: September 18, 1970 Mica Creek, British Columbia, Canada
- Died: June 20, 2025 (aged 54) Toronto, Ontario, Canada
- Height: 6 ft (183 cm)
- Occupation(s): Athlete, computer technician, machinist

Rugby union career
International career
Years	Team	Apps	(Points)
–	Canada		

Garett Deane Hickling (September 18, 1970 – June 20, 2025) was a Canadian wheelchair rugby player who was on the Canada national wheelchair rugby team and was voted most valuable player at several World Championships (1995, 1998, and 2002). He earned a gold medal from the 2002 World Championships in Gothenburg, Sweden: a silver medal from the 2004 Paralympic Games in Athens, Greece, and a bronze medal from 2008 in Beijing, China. He was the Canadian flag-bearer at the opening ceremony for the London 2012 Paralympics. He competed in every Paralympics that included his sport until his retirement, representing Canada five times.

== Biography ==
Hickling was born on September 18, 1970. He broke his neck at age 16 in 1987. He and two friends were hiking an unfamiliar British Columbia trail at night when they fell off a cliff; one of the friends died. About five years later, Hickling took up wheelchair rugby. Hickling died in Toronto on June 20, 2025, at the age of 54.

== Sources ==
- Murderball legend Hickling keeps pushing, The Province, September 22, 2010
