= 2014 IWRF World Championship =

2014 IWRF World Championship was the 6th international world wheelchair rugby competition, which took place between August 4 to August 10. The championships were contested between the world's twelve top national teams and was held at the Arena Fyn at Odense Congress Center in Odense, Denmark. The tournament was won by Australia, their first title.

As winners, Australia took the first slot for the wheelchair rugby tournament at the 2016 Summer Paralympics in Rio.

== Tournament ==
Twelve teams contested the 2014 IWRF World Championship. The preliminary rounds consisted of a group stage where the teams were split into two leagues which were contested as a round-robin. This was then followed by a round of crossover matches that determined the semi-finalists.

=== Preliminary round ===
==== Group A ====
Team	Pld	W	D	L	GF	GA	GD	Pts
Australia	5	5	0	0	314	246	+68	15
Canada	5	4	0	1	310	259	+51	12
(United Kingdom) Great Britain	5	3	0	2	255	236	+19	9
Denmark	5	2	0	3	254	257	-3	6
Finland	5	1	0	4	210	287	-77	3
Belgium	5	0	0	5	224	282	-58	0

August 4, 2014
16:30

Denmark	52 – 43	Belgium

Odense Congress Center
August 5, 2014
12:30

Finland	48 – 46	Belgium

Odense Congress Center
August 5, 2014
13:45

Denmark	47 – 58	Canada

Odense Congress Center
August 5, 2014
15:00

Great Britain (United Kingdom)	46 – 55	Australia

Odense Congress Center
August 6, 2014
10:00

Great Britain (United Kingdom)	54 – 31	Finland

Odense Congress Center
August 6, 2014
11:15

Belgium	46 – 72	Australia

Odense Congress Center
August 6, 2014
17:30

Canada	67 – 40	Finland

Odense Congress Center
August 6, 2014
16:15

Australia	56 – 50	Denmark

Odense Congress Center
August 7, 2014
11:15

Canada	59 – 58	(United Kingdom) Great Britain

Odense Congress Center
August 7, 2014
12:30

Australia	63 – 43	Finland

Odense Congress Center
August 7, 2014
17:15

Great Britain (United Kingdom)	52 – 48	Denmark

Odense Congress Center
August 7, 2014
17:30

Canada	65 – 46	Belgium

Odense Congress Center
August 8, 2014
12:30

Canada	61 – 68	Australia

Odense Congress Center
August 8, 2014
13:45

Denmark	57 – 48	Finland

Odense Congress Center
August 8, 2014
15:00

Belgium	43 – 45	(United Kingdom) Great Britain

Odense Congress Center

==== Group B ====
Team	Pld	W	D	L	GF	GA	GD	Pts
United States	5	5	0	0	308	199	+109	15
Japan	5	4	0	1	270	250	+20	12
Sweden	5	2	0	3	265	277	-12	6
New Zealand	5	2	0	3	230	243	-13	6
France	5	2	0	3	229	267	-38	6
Germany	5	0	0	5	193	263	-70	0

August 4, 2014
18:30

France	47 – 55	New Zealand

Odense Congress Center
August 5, 2014
10:00

Germany	38 – 53	Japan

Odense Congress Center
August 5, 2014
11:15

United States	62 – 41	France

Odense Congress Center
August 5, 2014
16:15

Japan	62 – 58	Sweden

Odense Congress Center
August 5, 2014
17:30

New Zealand	37 – 54	United States

Odense Congress Center
August 6, 2014
12:30

Sweden	48 – 65	United States

Odense Congress Center
August 6, 2014
13:45

Japan	54 – 45	New Zealand

Odense Congress Center
August 6, 2014
15:00

France	46 – 44	Germany

Odense Congress Center
August 7, 2014
10:00

New Zealand	49 – 55	Sweden

Odense Congress Center
August 7, 2014
13:45

France	44 – 56	Japan

Odense Congress Center
August 7, 2014
15:00

United States	62 – 28	Germany

Odense Congress Center
August 8, 2014
10:00

Sweden	54 – 50	Germany

Odense Congress Center
August 8, 2014
11:15

United States	65 – 45	Japan

Odense Congress Center
August 8, 2014
16:15

Germany	33 – 48	New Zealand

Odense Congress Center
August 8, 2014
17:00

Sweden	50 – 51	France

Odense Congress Center

=== Classification rounds ===
==== 9th–12th places ====
Classification round
9 August 2014 - 10:00
Finland	48
Germany	47
9 August 2014 - 11:15
France	59
Belgium	45

Ninth place
9 August 2014 - 11:15
France	59
Finland	48
Eleventh place
9 August 2014 - 17:30
Germany	50
Belgium	36

==== 5th–8th places ====
Classification round
9 August 2014 - 12:30
Denmark	54
Sweden	47
9 August 2014 - 13:45
Great Britain	55
New Zealand	45

Fifth place
10 August 2014 - 10:00
Great Britain	52
Denmark	48
Seventh place
10 August 2014 - 12:00
Sweden	52
New Zealand	50

=== Medals round ===
Semifinals
9 August 2014 - 15:00
Canada	59
United States	56
9 August 201 - 16:15
Australia	60
Japan	49

Gold-medal match
10 August 2014 - 16:00
Australia	67
Canada	56
Bronze-medal match
10 August 2014 - 14:00
United States	62
Japan	56
