= United States Wheelchair Rugby Association =

The United States Wheelchair Rugby Association (USWRA) is a 501(c)3 non-profit organization and the governing body for the domestic competition of wheelchair rugby in the United States. The organization shares voting privileges with USA Wheelchair Rugby (USAWR), within the international governing body for Wheelchair Rugby, World Wheelchair Rugby (WWR).

The United States Wheelchair Rugby Association (USWRA) provides oversight, promotes development and executes administration of the sport of Wheelchair Rugby across the United States. Since 1988, the Association has been promoting and supporting wheelchair rugby to provide competitive athletic opportunities to eligible people with disabilities and also to empower people to reach their full potential in all areas of life. The USWRA features over 40 teams with more than 500 athletes across the country.
