= Greg Smith (Paralympian) =

Australian Paralympic athlete (born 1967)

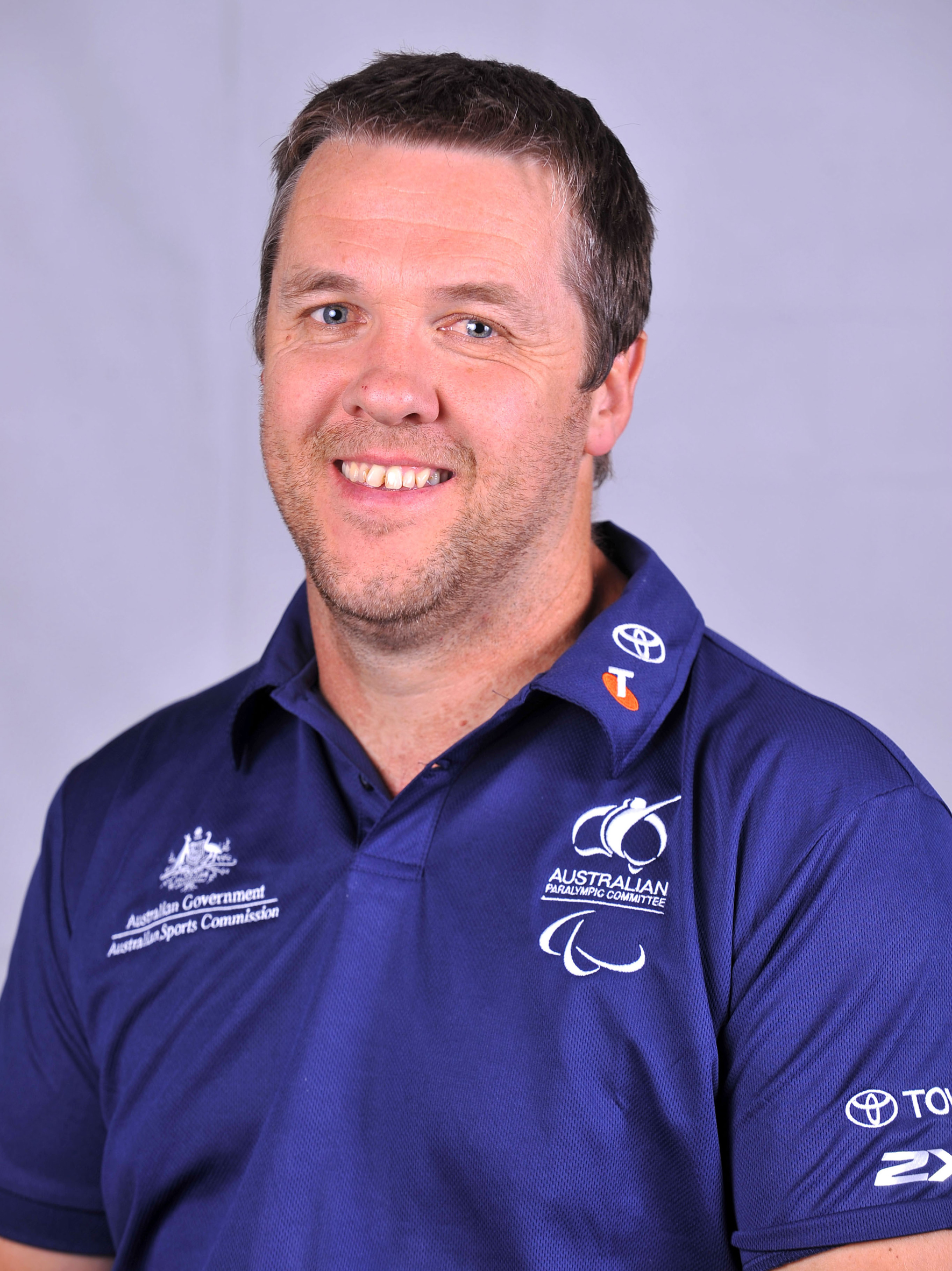
- 2012 Australian Paralympic team portrait of Smith

Personal information
- Full name: Gregory Stephen Smith
- Nationality: Australian
- Born: 19 August 1967 (age 59) Ballarat, Victoria

Sport
- Disability class: T51, T52, 2.0 (Wheelchair rugby)
Medal record
Athletics
Paralympic Games
Gold medal – first place	2000 Sydney	Men's 800 m T52
Gold medal – first place	2000 Sydney	Men's 1500 m T52
Gold medal – first place	2000 Sydney	Men's 5000 m T52
Silver medal – second place	1992 Barcelona	Men's 4x100 m Relay TW1–2
Silver medal – second place	1996 Atlanta	Men's 5000 m T51
Bronze medal – third place	1992 Barcelona	Men's Marathon TW2
Bronze medal – third place	1992 Barcelona	Men's 4x400 m Relay TW1–2
World Championships and Games for the Disabled
Gold medal – first place	1990 Assen	Men's 4x100 m Relay T1
IPC Athletics World Championships
Gold medal – first place	1994 Berlin	Men's 5000 m T51
Gold medal – first place	1998 Birmingham	Men's 800 m T52
Gold medal – first place	1998 Birmingham	Men's 1500 m T52
Gold medal – first place	1998 Birmingham	Men's 5000 m T52
Gold medal – first place	1998 Birmingham	Men's Marathon T52
Wheelchair rugby
Paralympic Games
Gold medal – first place	2012 London	Mixed
Silver medal – second place	2008 Beijing	Mixed

Gregory Stephen Smith, OAM (born 19 August 1967) is an Australian Paralympic athlete and wheelchair rugby player who won three gold medals in athletics at the 2000 Summer Paralympics, and a gold medal in wheelchair rugby at the 2012 Summer Paralympics, where he was the flag bearer at the opening ceremony. Since 2018, he has been the Assistant Coach of the Australian Steelers.

== Personal ==
Smith was born on 19 August 1967 in the Victorian city of Ballarat. He broke his neck in a car accident in 1987 while he was a physical training instructor with the Australian Army. The accident left him with little movement from the chest down. He went through one and a half years of gruelling rehabilitation but his life became active again in 1988 after another patient lent him a racing wheelchair.

== Athletics career ==
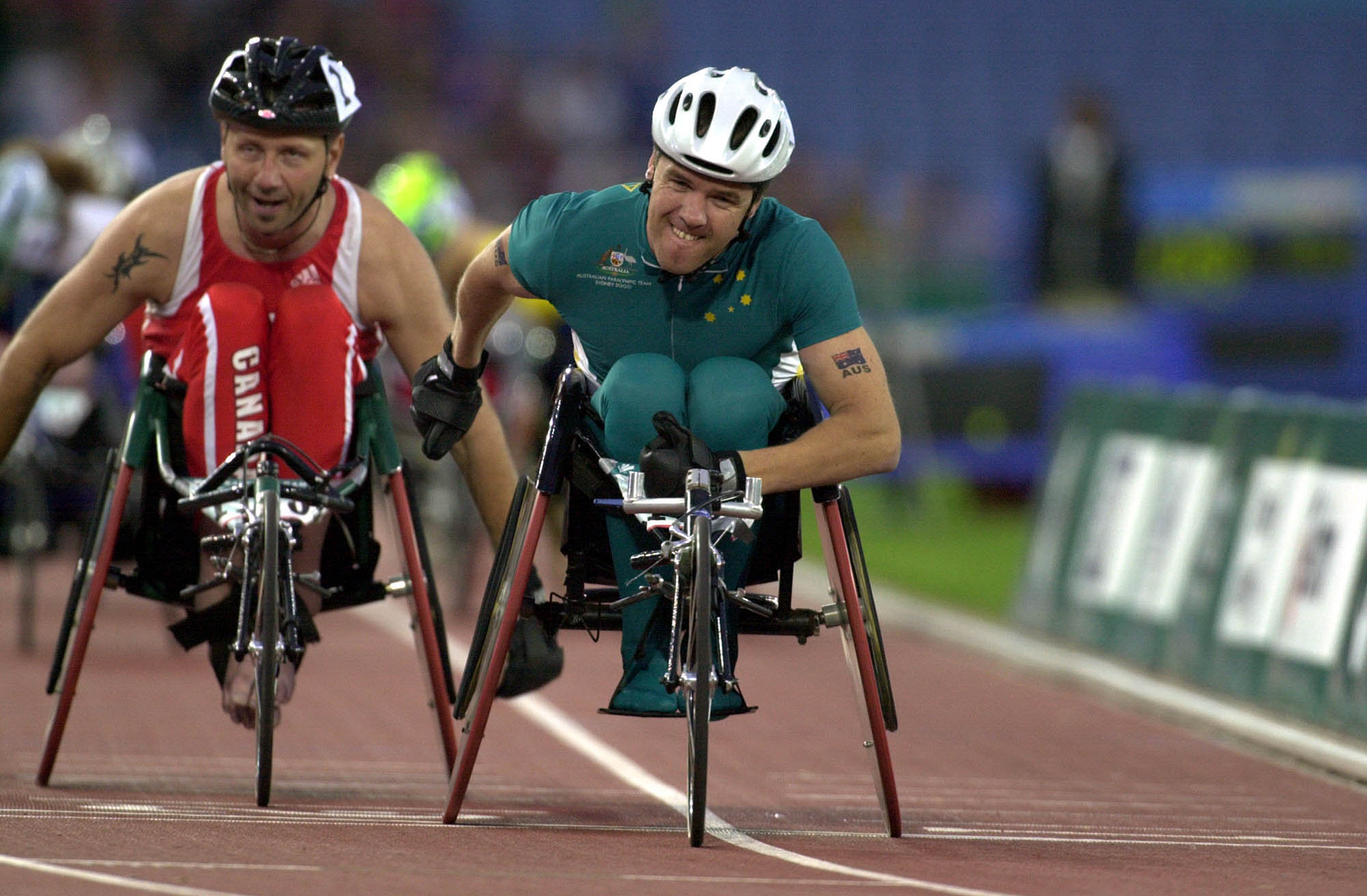
Action shot of Smith (right)) on his way to winning gold in the 800 m T52 at the 2000 Sydney Paralympics

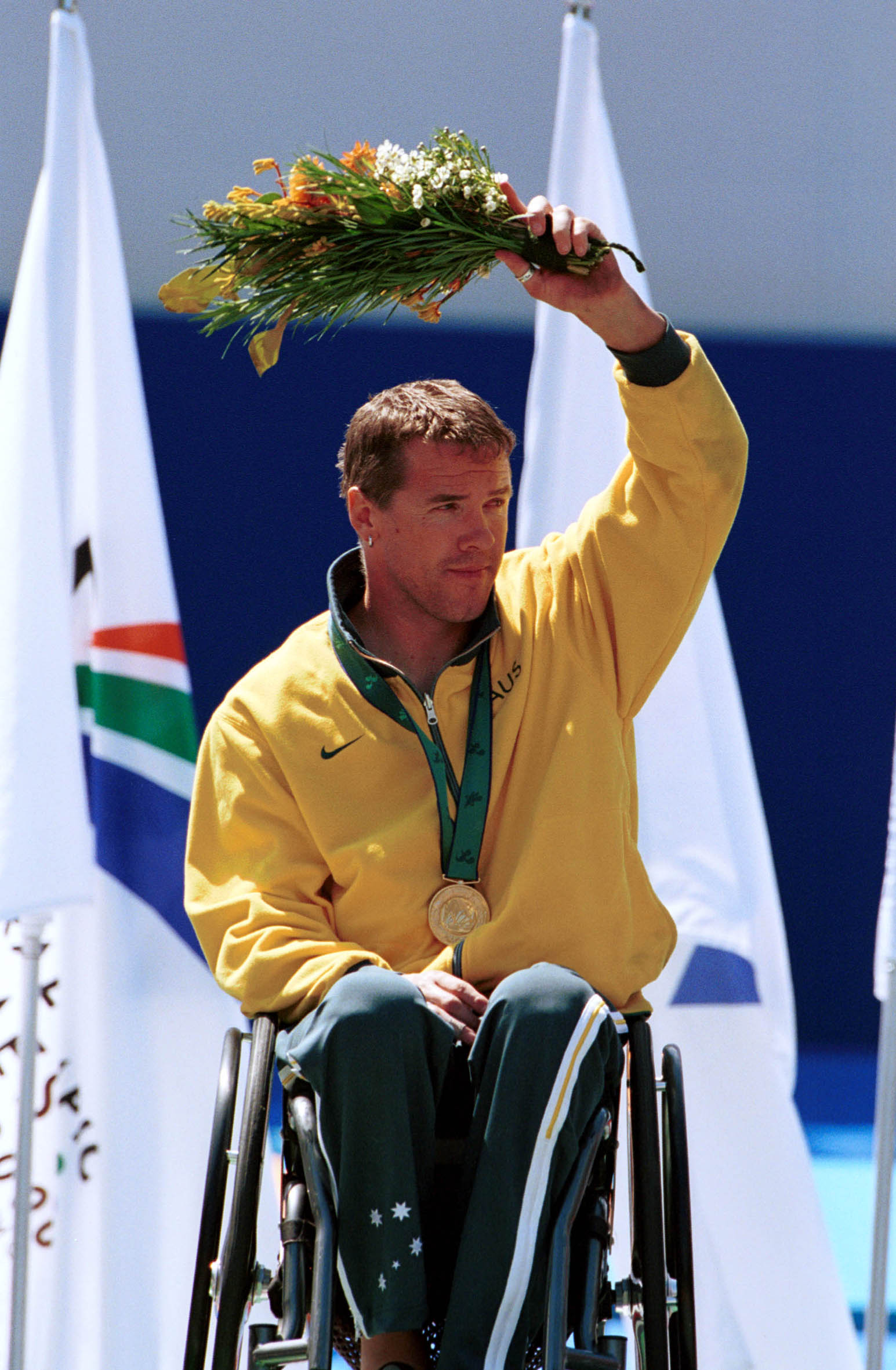
Smith waves to the crowd as he celebrates his gold medal in the 5000 m T52 at the 2000 Sydney Paralympics

Smith won a gold medal in the men's 4x100 m T1 at the World Championships and Games for the Disabled in Assen, Netherlands. He then began his long Paralympic career with a silver medal in the men's 4x100 m relay TW1–2, and bronze medals in the men's marathon TW2 and the men's 4x400 m relay TW1–2 at the 1992 Barcelona Games. He also competed in the men's 800 m, 1500 m and 5000 m TW2 events. In 1992, he held a scholarship with the Victorian Institute of Sport in athletics. That year, he finished fourth in the 10 km road race at the 1992 Oz Day race. In 1995, he was awarded an Australian Institute of Sport Athletes with a Disability non-residential scholarship which he held until 2000.

At the 1996 Atlanta Games, Smith won a silver medal in the men's 5000 m T51. He also competed in the men's 400 m, 1500 m and marathon in T51 events. Smith won three gold medals at the 2000 Sydney Games in the men's 800 m T52, men's 1500 m T52 and men's 5000 m T52 events, for which he received a Medal of the Order of Australia. He also competed in the men's marathon T52. At the 1998 IPC Athletics World Championships in Berlin, he won four gold medals in the men's 800 m, men's 1500 m, men's 5000 m and the men's marathon.

== Wheelchair Rugby career ==
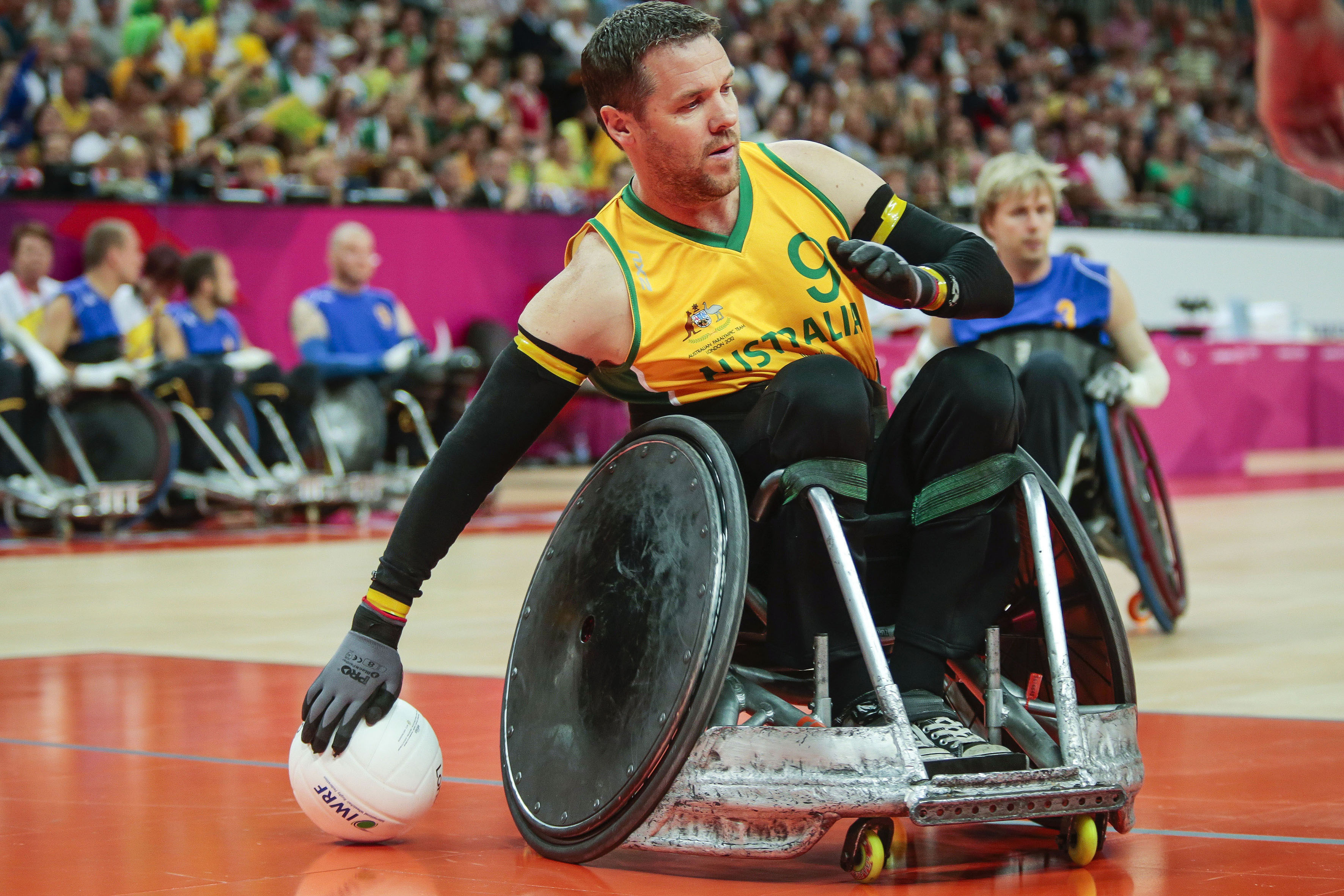
Smith playing wheelchair rugby at the 2012 London Paralympics

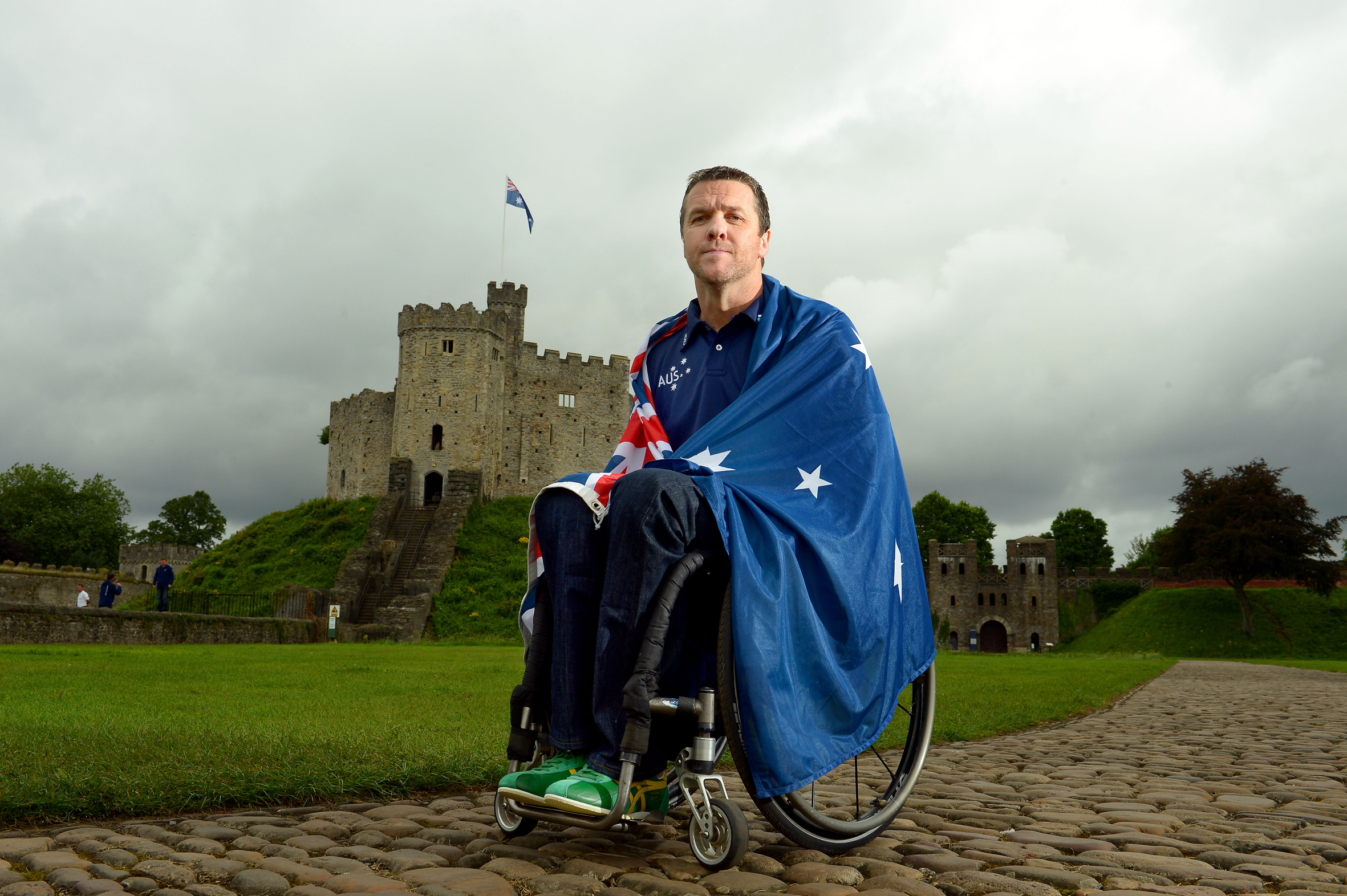
Smith wraps himself in the Australian Flag outside Cardiff Castle after the announcement that he will be the 2012 Australian Flag Bearer

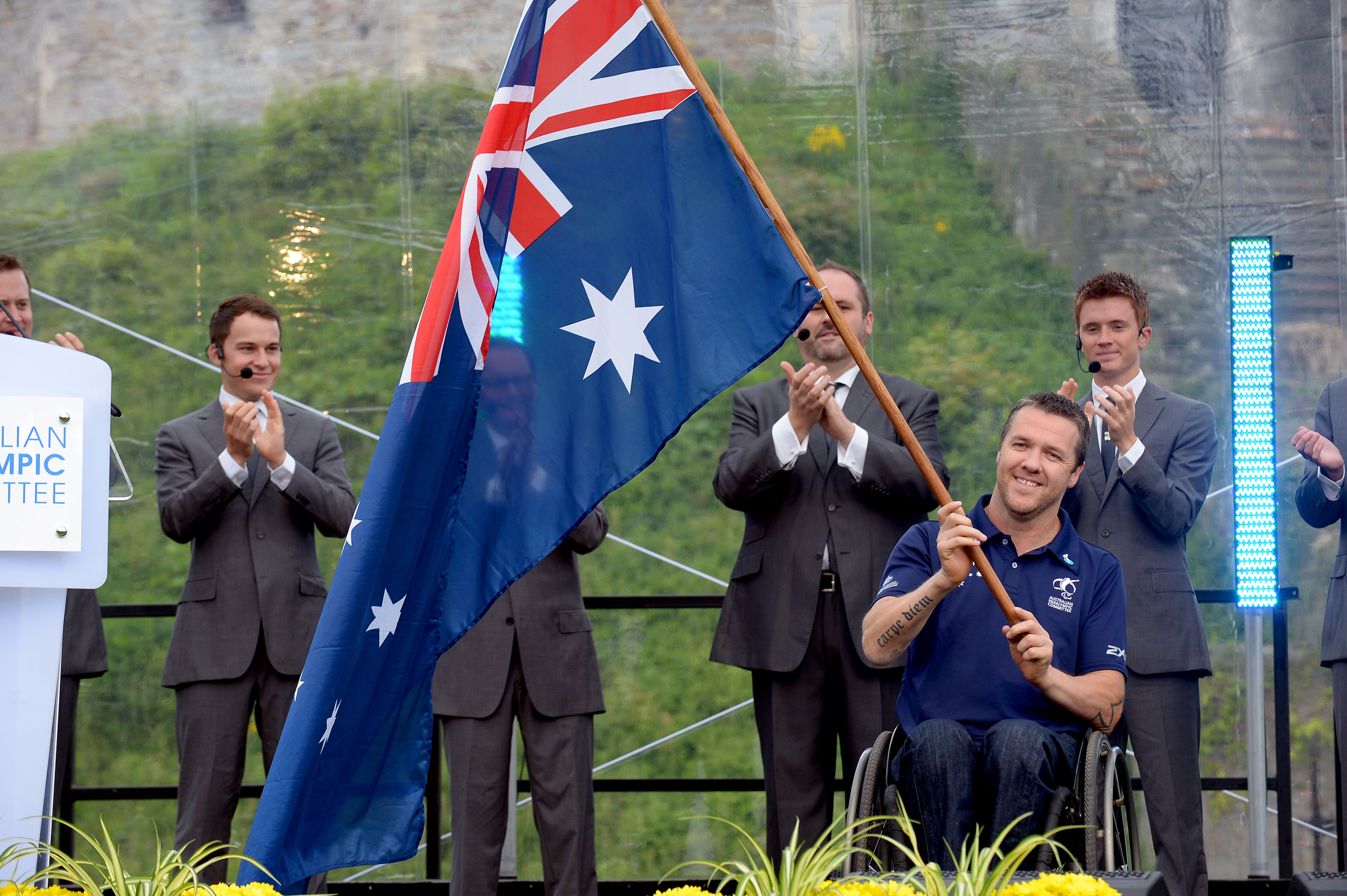
The ceremony on 21 August where Smith was announced as 2012 Australian Flag Bearer for the Australian Paralympic Team

Smith retired from wheelchair athletics in 2002. After a two-year break, he took up wheelchair rugby socially and at the end of his first season he won the New South Wales State League Most Valuable Player Award and the National League Best New Talent. In 2006, he represented Australia for the first time in wheelchair rugby at the Canada Cup International Tournament. He was a member of the Australian mixed team that won the silver medal in wheelchair rugby at the 2008 Beijing Games . After Beijing, he retired as a player but continued as an assistant coach. He came out of retirement in 2010 and was re-selected to the Australian squad in 2011. He was the Australian flag bearer at the 2012 London Games, and was part of the team that won the gold medal. He retired after the Games but still has an active interest in the sport.

Since 2018, he has been the Assistant Coach of the Australian Steelers.

== Recognition ==
- OAM, 2001
- Australian Team Flag Bearer at 2012 Summer Paralympics
- Honorary Doctorate, University of Ballarat, 2013
