= World Wheelchair Rugby Championships =

International wheelchair rugby event

Tournament information
- Sport: Wheelchair rugby
- Established: 1995
- Administrator: WWR

Tournament statistics
- Current champion: United States (5nd title)
- Most titles: United States (5 titles)

World Wheelchair Rugby Championships is an international wheelchair rugby competition contested by the national teams of the members of World Wheelchair Rugby (WWR), the sport's global governing body.

The first Wheelchair Rugby World Championships was held in Notwil, Switzerland in 1995.

== Results ==
=== Summaries ===
Year	Host (final location)	Gold medal game			Bronze medal game
Year	Host (final location)	Gold	Score	Silver	Bronze	Score	Fourth place
1995	Switzerland (Nottwil)	United States	41–36	Canada	New Zealand	41–28	Great Britain
1998	Canada (Toronto)	United States	31–28	New Zealand	Canada	44–35	Sweden
2002	Sweden (Gothenburg)	Canada	25–24	United States	Australia	45–38	Belgium
2006	New Zealand (Christchurch)	United States	34–30	New Zealand	Canada	23–19	Great Britain
2010	Canada (Vancouver)	United States	57–45	Australia	Japan	53–47	Sweden
2014	Denmark (Odense)	Australia	67–56	Canada	United States	62–56	Japan
2018	Australia (Sydney)	Japan	62–61	Australia	United States	47–36	Great Britain
2022	Denmark (Vejle)	Australia	58–55	United States	Japan	61–57	Denmark
2026	Brazil (São Paulo)	United States	57-51	Australia	Japan	54-47	Great Britain

=== Medal table ===
Rank	Nation	Gold	Silver	Bronze	Total
1	United States	5	2	2	9
2	Australia	2	3	1	6
3	Canada	1	2	2	5
4	Japan	1	0	3	4
5	New Zealand	0	2	1	3
Totals (5 entries)		9	9	9	27

=== Participating nations ===
Team	(Switzerland) 1995	(Canada) 1998	(Sweden) 2002	(New Zealand) 2006	(Canada) 2010	(Denmark) 2014	(Australia) 2018	(Denmark) 2022	(Brazil) 2026	Total
Argentina	–	–	–	–	12th	–	–	–	–	1
Australia	5th	5th	3rd	6th	2nd	1st	2nd	1st	tbc	9
Austria	–	11th	12th	–	–	–	–	–	–	2
Belgium	–	8th	4th	8th	7th	12th	–	–	tbc	6
Brazil	–	–	–	–	–	–	–	11th	–	2
Canada	2nd	3rd	1st	3rd	5th	2nd	6th	5th	tbc	9
Colombia	–	–	–	–	–	–	10th	9th	tbc	3
Denmark	–	–	–	12th	–	6th	7th	4th	tbc	5
Finland	–	12th	–	–	11th	10th	–	–	–	3
France	–	–	–	–	–	9th	5th	6th	tbc	4
Germany	–	6th	9th	7th	10th	11th	–	10th	tbc	7
Great Britain	4th	7th	5th	4th	6th	5th	4th	7th	tbc	9
Ireland	–	–	–	–	–	–	12th	–	–	1
Japan	–	–	8th	5th	3rd	4th	1st	3rd	tbc	7
Netherlands	7th	9th	10th	10th	–	–	–	–	tbc	5
New Zealand	3rd	2nd	6th	2nd	9th	8th	11th	8th	tbc	9
Poland	–	–	–	–	8th	–	9th	–	–	2
Sweden	6th	4th	7th	9th	4th	7th	8th	–	–	7
Switzerland	8th	10th	11th	11th	–	–	–	12th	–	5
United States	1st	1st	2nd	1st	1st	3rd	3rd	2nd	tbc	9
Number of teams	8	12	12	12	12	12	12	12	12	20

== See also ==
- IWRF Americas Championship
- IWRF Asia-Oceania Championship
- IWRF European Championship
