= Seiya Norimatsu =

- Born: April 2, 1990 (age 36) Ōmuta, Fukuoka, Japan
- Occupation: Wheelchair rugby player

Rugby union career
- Position: -
International career
Years	Team	Apps	(Points)
- Japan
Medal record
Representing Japan
Paralympic Games
Wheelchair rugby
Gold medal – first place	2024 Paris	Wheelchair Rugby
Bronze medal – third place	2016 Rio de Janeiro	Wheelchair Rugby
Bronze medal – third place	2020 Tokyo	Wheelchair Rugby
World Games
Silver medal – second place	2022 Birmingham	Wheelchair Rugby

Seiya Norimatsu (乗松 聖矢, Norimatsu Seiya; born April 2, 1990) is a Japanese wheelchair rugby player who currently plays for Team SMBC and the Japanese national team.

== Background ==
Norimatsu was born in Ōmuta, Fukuoka and was raised in Fukuoka Prefecture. He graduated from Ariake National College of Technology.

== Career ==
Due to Charcot-Marie-Tooth disease, Norimatsu used a wheelchair from the age of 12, started wheelchair basketball at the age of 16, and switched to wheelchair rugby at the age of 23. He was selected to represent Japan at the 2016 Summer Paralympics and contributed to the team's first medal win.

In 2021, Norimatsu was selected as a recommended player for the Japanese national team for the 2020 Summer Paralympics and won a bronze medal. In 2024, he was again selected as a recommended athlete for the Japanese national team for the 2024 Summer Paralympics, with whom he won a gold medal.
