= Hidefumi Wakayama =

- Born: January 3, 1985 (age 41) Numazu, Shizuoka, Japan
- Occupation: Wheelchair rugby player

Rugby union career
- Position: -
International career
Years	Team	Apps	(Points)
- Japan
Medal record
Representing Japan
Paralympic Games
Wheelchair rugby
Gold medal – first place	2024 Paris	Wheelchair Rugby
Bronze medal – third place	2016 Rio de Janeiro	Wheelchair Rugby
Bronze medal – third place	2020 Tokyo	Wheelchair Rugby
World Games
Silver medal – second place	2022 Birmingham	Wheelchair Rugby

Hidefumi Wakayama (若山 英史, Wakayama Hidefumi; born January 3, 1985 in Numazu, Shizuoka, Japan) is a Japanese wheelchair rugby player who currently plays for Shizuoka Bank/CENTERPOLE and the Japanese national team.

== Background and career ==
At the age of 19, Wakayama injured his spine in a swimming pool accident and began playing wheelchair rugby at a rehabilitation facility. He was later selected to represent Japan in the London and Rio Paralympics, and contributed to Japan's first medal win at the latter.

In 2021, Wakayama was selected as a recommended player for the Japanese national team for the 2020 Summer Paralympics and won a bronze medal. In 2024, he was again selected as a recommended athlete for the Japanese national team for the 2024 Summer Paralympics, with whom he won a gold medal.
