= Hitoshi Ogawa (wheelchair rugby) =

- Born: June 2, 1994 (age 32) Kita, Tokyo, Japan
- Occupation: Wheelchair rugby player

Rugby union career
International career
Years	Team	Apps	(Points)
- Japan
Medal record
Representing Japan
Paralympic Games
Wheelchair rugby
Gold medal – first place	2024 Paris	Wheelchair Rugby
Bronze medal – third place	2020 Tokyo	Wheelchair Rugby
World Games
Silver medal – second place	2022 Birmingham	Wheelchair Rugby

Hitoshi Ogawa (小川 仁士, Ogawa Hitoshi; born June 2, 1994 in Kita, Tokyo, Japan) is a Japanese wheelchair rugby player who currently plays for Bayer Yakuhin/Centerpole and the Japanese national team.

== Background and career ==
Ogawa made his debut in the domestic B-class motocross at the age of 16. He was promoted to the domestic A-class at the age of 17, and at the age of 18, he stepped up to the international B-class and participated in the All Japan Motocross Championships. He fell during a race that year and suffered a cervical spinal cord injury, and began wheelchair rugby as part of his rehabilitation.

In 2021, Ogawa was selected as a recommended player for the Japanese national team for the 2020 Summer Paralympics and won a bronze medal.
