= Masayuki Haga =

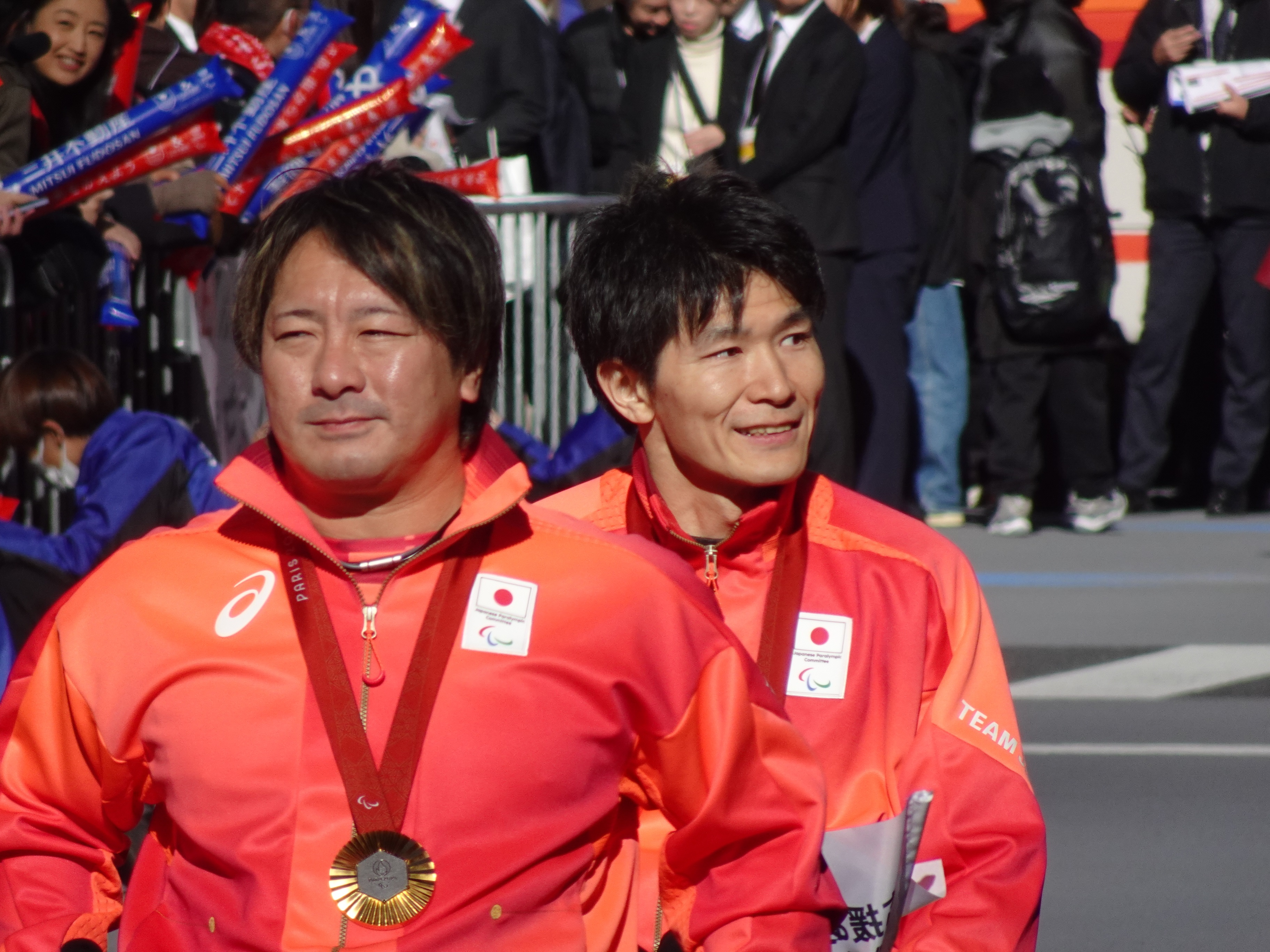
- Masayuki Haga (right) at Paris 2024 Summer Olympians and Paralympians Japan National Team parade event on November 30th, 2024
- Born: November 12, 1984 (age 42) Matsudo, Chiba, Japan
- Occupation: Wheelchair rugby player

Rugby union career
- Position: -
International career
Years	Team	Apps	(Points)
- Japan
Medal record
Representing Japan
Paralympic Games
Wheelchair rugby
Gold medal – first place	2024 Paris	Wheelchair Rugby
Bronze medal – third place	2016 Rio de Janeiro	Wheelchair Rugby
Bronze medal – third place	2020 Tokyo	Wheelchair Rugby

Masayuki Haga (羽賀 理之, Haga Masayuki; born November 12, 1984) is a Japanese wheelchair rugby player who currently plays for PeptiDream/AXE and the Japanese national team.

== Background and career ==
After playing baseball from an early age, Haga started wheelchair rugby at the age of 20 after suffering a spinal cord injury in an accident. He was selected to represent Japan at the 2016 Summer Paralympics, where he contributed to the team's first medal win. In 2019, he was appointed vice captain of the Japanese wheelchair rugby team.

In 2021, Haga was selected as a recommended player for the Japanese national team for the 2020 Summer Paralympics and won a bronze medal.
