= Yukinobu Ike =

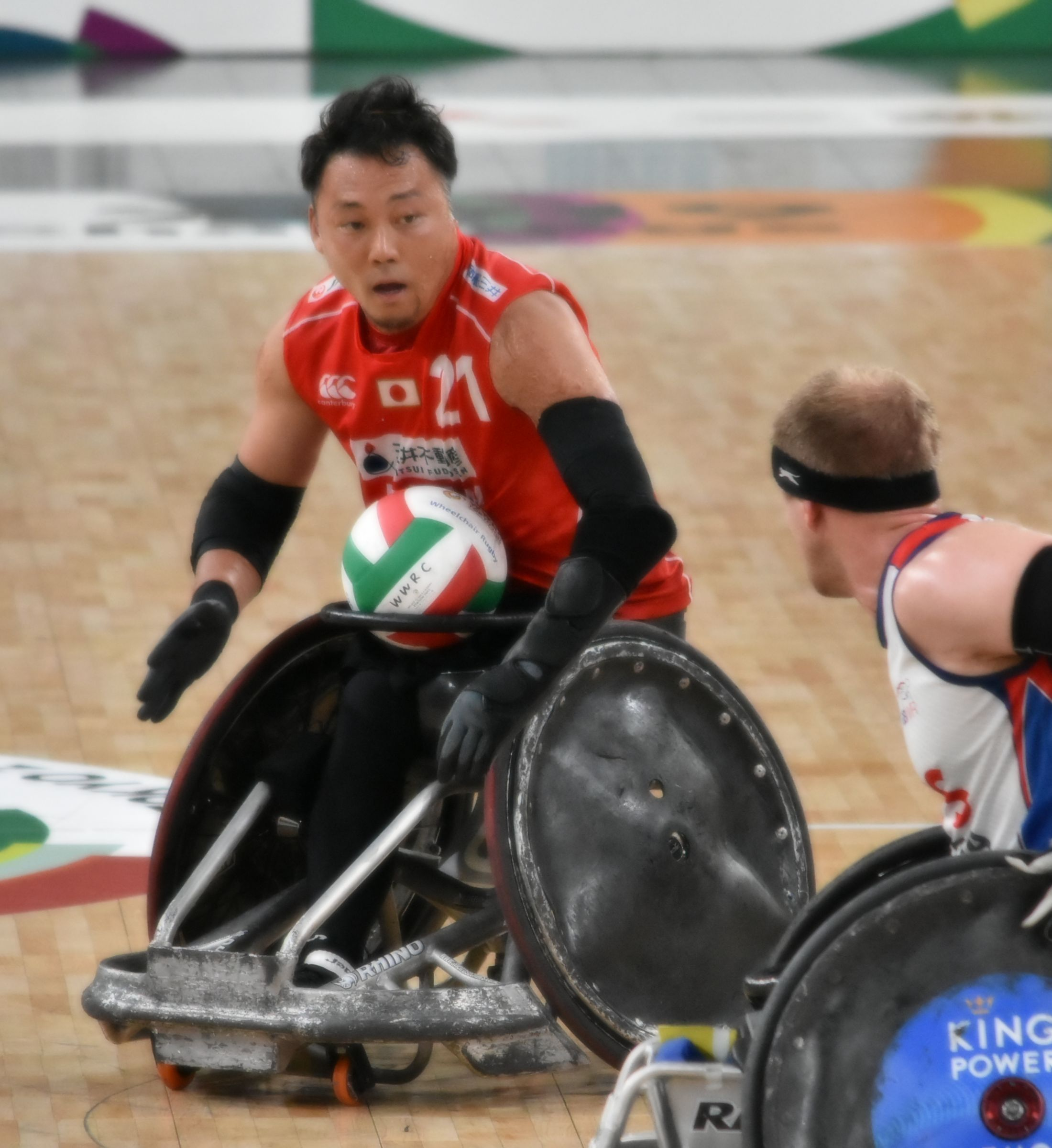
- Born: July 21, 1980 (age 46) Kōchi, Kōchi, Japan
- Occupation: Wheelchair rugby player

Rugby union career
- Position: -
International career
Years	Team	Apps	(Points)
- Japan
Medal record
Representing Japan
Paralympic Games
Wheelchair rugby
Gold medal – first place	2024 Paris	Wheelchair Rugby
Bronze medal – third place	2016 Rio de Janeiro	Wheelchair Rugby
Bronze medal – third place	2020 Tokyo	Wheelchair Rugby

Yukinobo Ike (池 透暢, Ike Yukinobo; born July 21, 1980 in Kōchi, Kōchi) is a Japanese wheelchair rugby player whose position class is 3.0. He currently plays for Nikko Asset Management/Kochi Freedom and has captained the Japanese national team since 2014. He won a bronze medal in the 2016 and 2020 Summer Paralympics and a gold medal in the 2024 edition.

== Background ==
Ike graduated from Kochi Municipal Nankai Junior High School and Kochi Prefectural Kochi Minami High School.

At the age of 19, he was involved in a car accident with five people, including a friend, in which three people died. Ike survived, but his left leg was amputated, he lost the use of his left arm, and he suffered burns on 75% of his body. To treat his burns, he underwent about 40 surgeries over two and a half years, including skin grafts from his back and head. Having played basketball in Nankai Junior High School, Ike was introduced to wheelchair basketball while hospitalized. As he still had a disability in his left arm, he started with wheelchair basketball, and was selected as a candidate for the regional selection team and the Japanese national team, but was not selected for the Japanese national team for the 2012 Summer Paralympics.

== Career ==
After watching the Japanese wheelchair rugby team compete for a medal at the London Paralympics (finishing in 4th place), Ike felt sorry for the people who supported him as a wheelchair basketball player, but decided to switch to wheelchair rugby. He distinguished himself with the wheelchair operation skills he had honed in wheelchair basketball and accurate long passes from his right arm, and was selected as a Japan national team training player in 2013. In 2014, he was appointed captain of the Japanese wheelchair rugby team. In 2015, he won the Asia Oceania Championship for the first time in history. In 2016, Ike won the bronze medal for the first time in history at the Paralympic Games. In 2018, he won the 2018 Japan Para Wheelchair Rugby Tournament. In August of the same year, he won the Wheelchair Rugby World Championship (GIO 2018 IWRF Wheelchair Rugby World Championship) held in Sydney, defeating Australia, ranked number one in the world, in the final (Japan was ranked 4th), and won his first championship.

In 2021, Shimakawa was selected as a recommended player for the Japanese national team for the 2020 Summer Paralympics and won a bronze medal.
