= Daisuke Ikezaki =

Japanese wheelchair rugby player (born 1978)

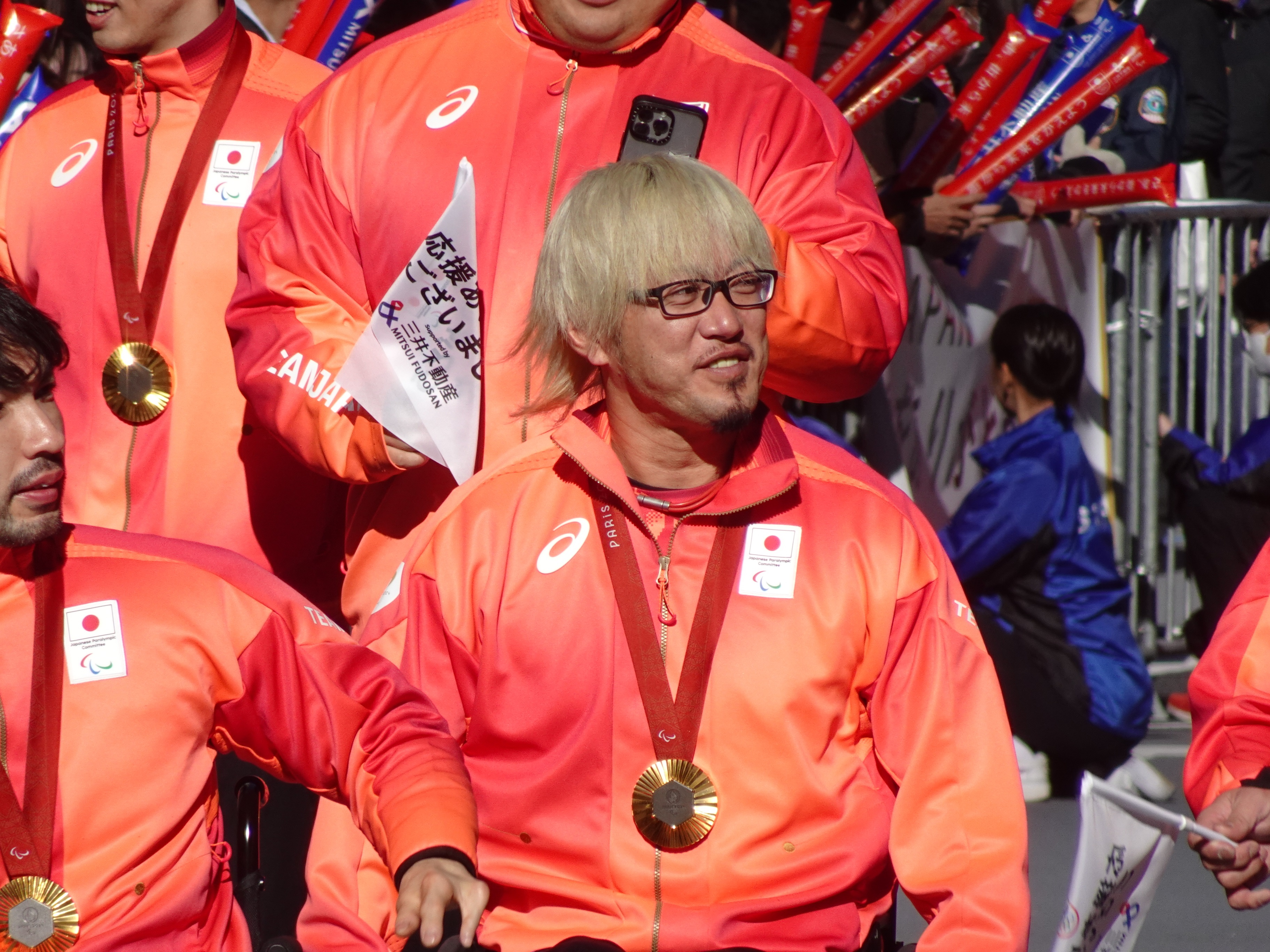
- Daisuke Ikezaki at Paris 2024 Summer Olympians and Paralympians Japan National Team parade event on November 30th, 2024
- Born: January 23, 1978 (age 48) Hakodate, Hokkaido, Japan
- Occupation: Wheelchair rugby player

Rugby union career
- Position: -
International career
Years	Team	Apps	(Points)
- Japan
Medal record
Representing Japan
Paralympic Games
Wheelchair rugby
Gold medal – first place	2024 Paris	Wheelchair Rugby
Bronze medal – third place	2016 Rio de Janeiro	Wheelchair Rugby
Bronze medal – third place	2020 Tokyo	Wheelchair Rugby

Daisuke Ikezaki (池崎 大輔, Ikezaki Daisuke; born January 23, 1978 in Hakodate, Hokkaido) is a Japanese wheelchair rugby player. On the club level, he currently plays for the Tokyo Suns.

== Background ==
At the age of six, Ikezaki was diagnosed with Charcot-Marie-Tooth disease, an incurable disease that gradually weakens the muscles in the arms and legs. In 1995, while attending Iwamizawa High School for the Disabled, he started playing wheelchair basketball, but as his arm strength gradually weakened and he was no longer able to play as well as he wanted, he switched to wheelchair rugby in 2008.

== Career ==
In 2009, Ikezaki joined the Hokkaido Big Dippers. The team placed third in the Japan Championship that year, and he was recognized for his performance and selected as a national training player. In April 2010, he was selected for the Japanese national team, and in August at the World Championships (Canada), he won the 3.0 class best player award, and the national team also won a bronze medal. In 2012, he participated in the 2012 Summer Paralympics, where he said, "In London, fourth or fifth place is no good. I want at least bronze. My goal is gold." He played an active role as a key member of the national team, but lost to the United States in the third-place deciding match and failed to win a medal.

In October 2015, Ikezaki won the Mitsubishi Corporation 2015 IWRF Asia Oceania Championship, earning a spot in the Rio de Janeiro Paralympics. Ikezaki was awarded the 3.0 Class Best Player Award and MVP. In July 2016, he joined Mitsubishi Corporation. At the 2016 Summer Paralympics, he lost to Australia in the semi-finals, but defeated Canada in the third-place deciding match to win the bronze medal. He was awarded the Hakodate City Honorary Award. On August 10, 2018, Japan defeated the Rio Paralympic champion Australia 62–61 in the World Championship final to win its first title, and Ikezaki was named Most Valuable Player (MVP). In April 2019, he transferred from Hokkaido TxT Big Dippers to TOKYO SUNS.

Ikezaki participated in the rescheduled 2020 Summer Paralympics and won a bronze medal.
