= Shinichi Shimakawa =

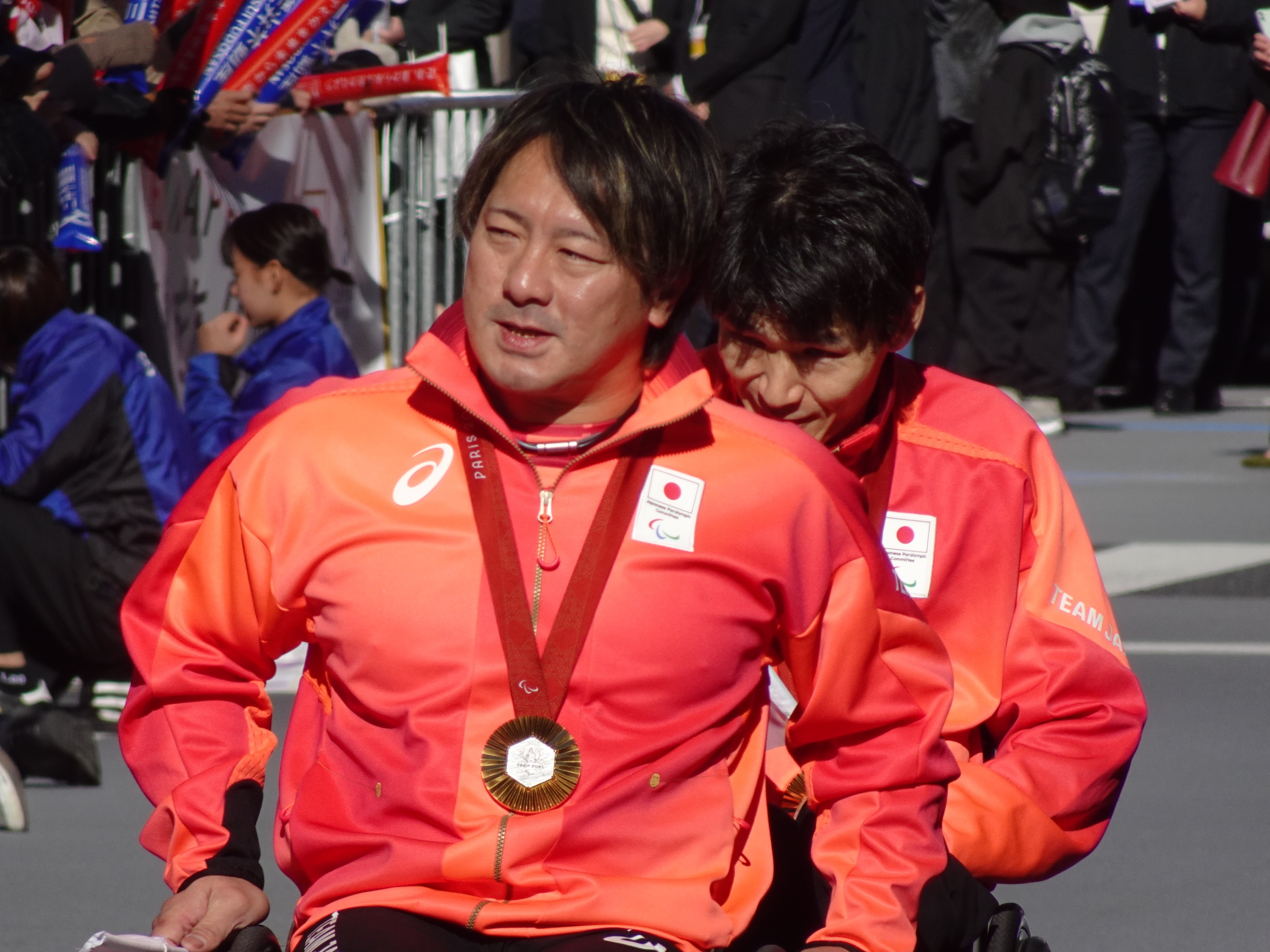
- Shinichi Shimakawa at Paris 2024 Summer Olympians and Paralympians Japan National Team parade event on November 30th, 2024
- Born: January 29, 1975 (age 51) Nagasu, Kumamoto, Japan
- Occupation: Wheelchair rugby player

Rugby union career
- Position: -
International career
| Years | Team | Apps | (Points) |
- Japan
Medal record
Representing Japan
Paralympic Games
Wheelchair rugby
| Gold medal – first place | 2024 Paris | Wheelchair Rugby |
| Bronze medal – third place | 2016 Rio de Janeiro | Wheelchair Rugby |
| Bronze medal – third place | 2020 Tokyo | Wheelchair Rugby |

Shinichi Shimakawa (島川 慎一, Shimakawa Shinichi; born January 29, 1975 in Nagasu, Kumamoto, Japan) is a Japanese wheelchair rugby player who currently plays for Barclays Securities and the Japanese national team. He participated in the Summer Paralympics in 2012 and won a bronze medal in the 2016, 2020 editions and a gold medal in the 2024 edition.

== Background and career ==
At the age of 21, Shimakawa was involved in a traffic accident that damaged his cervical spinal cord, forcing him to use a wheelchair. In summer 1999, he started playing wheelchair rugby after watching a match. In 2005, he founded "BLITZ". To date, he has won the Japan Championships eight times. At the same time, he began playing in the USQRA (US domestic league) as a member of the Phoenix Heat from the 2005–2006 season. In the 2005–2006 season, he won his first USQRA Division I Nationals (US Championships) and became the first foreign player to receive the USQRA Athlete of the Year award. After that, he played in the US domestic league for a total of four seasons, winning the US national championship in two of those seasons.

In 2021, Shimakawa was selected as a recommended player for the Japanese national team for the 2020 Summer Paralympics and won a bronze medal.

== Awards and honors ==
In 2016, Shimakawa received the Saitama Sports Achievement Award.
