= Chuck Melton =

American wheelchair rugby player

Personal information
- Full name: Charles Melton
- Nickname: Chuck
- Born: August 20, 1978 (age 47) Madisonville, Kentucky, U.S.
- Education: Southern Illinois University Carbondale

Sport
- Sport: Wheelchair rugby
- Disability class: 2.0
Medal record
Wheelchair rugby
Representing the United States
Paralympic Games
Silver medal – second place	2016 Rio de Janeiro	Team
Silver medal – second place	2020 Tokyo	Team
Silver medal – second place	2024 Paris	Team
World Championships
Silver medal – second place	2022 Vejle	Team
Bronze medal – third place	2014 Odense	Team
Bronze medal – third place	2018 Sydney	Team
Parapan American Games
Gold medal – first place	2019 Lima	Team
Silver medal – second place	2015 Toronto	Team

Charles Melton (born August 20, 1978) is an American wheelchair rugby player and member of the United States national wheelchair rugby team.

== Career ==
Melton represented the United States at the 2019 Parapan American Games and won a gold medal in wheelchair rugby.

On April 30, 2024, he was selected to represent the United States at the 2024 Summer Paralympics.

== Personal life ==
In August 2002, Melton was involved in a diving accident, resulting in a C7 spinal cord injury.
