= Shunya Nakamachi =

- Born: August 30, 1994 (age 32) Kitamoto, Saitama, Japan
- Occupation: Wheelchair rugby player

Rugby union career
- Position: -
International career
Years	Team	Apps	(Points)
- Japan
Medal record
Representing Japan
Paralympic Games
Wheelchair rugby
Gold medal – first place	2024 Paris	Wheelchair Rugby
Bronze medal – third place	2020 Tokyo	Wheelchair Rugby

Shunya Nakamachi (中町 俊耶, Nakamachi Shunya; born August 30, 1994 in Kitamoto, Saitama, Japan) is a Japanese wheelchair rugby player who currently plays for COLOPL and the Japanese national team.

== Background and career ==
Nakamachi graduated from Honjo Daiichi High School in March 2013. He was a member of the baseball team in high school. While still a member of the baseball team as a freshman in college, he broke his neck and now has disabilities in both hands and the lower body.

In 2021, Nakamachi was selected as a recommended player for the Japanese national team for the 2020 Summer Paralympics and won a bronze medal.
