= Wheelchair rugby at the 2024 Summer Paralympics =

Wheelchair rugby at the XVII Paralympic Games
- Paralympic Wheelchair Rugby
- Venue: Grand Palais Éphémère
- Dates: 29 August to 2 September
- Competitors: 96 from 8 nations

Medalists
1st place, gold medalist(s)		Japan (JPN)
2nd place, silver medalist(s)		United States (USA)
3rd place, bronze medalist(s)		Australia (AUS)

Wheelchair rugby at the 2024 Summer Paralympics in Paris, France took place between 29 August to 2 September 2024. Great Britain, the defending Paralympic champions, lost their title to Japan.

== Qualification ==
Means of qualification	Date	Venue	Berths	Qualified
Host country allocation	—	—	1	France
2023 WWR European Championships Division A	3–7 May 2023	(United Kingdom) Cardiff	2	Great Britain; Denmark
2023 WWR Asia-Oceania-Africa Championships	29 June – 2 July 2023	(Japan) Tokyo	1	Japan
2023 Parapan American Games	17–26 November 2023	(Chile) Santiago	1	United States
2024 Paralympic Qualification Tournament	17–25 March 2024	(New Zealand) Wellington	3	Australia; Canada; Germany
Total			8	

== Medalists ==
Event	Gold	Silver	Bronze
Mixed open	Japan; Daisuke Ikezaki; Ryuji Kusaba; Yukinobu Ike; Hitoshi Ogawa; Hidefumi Wakayama; Yuki Hasegawa; Kae Kurahashi; Masayuki Haga; Shinichi Shimakawa; Shunya Nakamachi; Seiya Norimatsu; Katsuya Hashimoto	United States; Sarah Adam; Chuck Aoki; Clayton Brackett; Jeff Butler; Lee Fredette; Brad Hudspeth; Chuck Melton; Eric Newby; Josh O'Neill; Zion Redington; Mason Symons; Josh Wheeler	Australia; Ryley Batt; Chris Bond; Ben Fawcett; Brayden Foxley-Connolly; Andrew Edmondson; Shae Graham; Jake Howe; Josh Nicholson; James McQuillan; Emilie Miller; Ella Sabljak; Beau Vernon

== Tournament ==
=== Group phase ===
==== Group A ====
Pos	Team	Pld	W	D	L	GF	GA	GD	Pts	Qualification
1	Japan	3	3	0	0	150	132	+18	6	Semi-finals
2	United States	3	2	0	1	150	140	+10	4	Semi-finals
3	Canada	3	1	0	2	148	148	0	2	Playoff rounds
4	Germany	3	0	0	3	138	166	−28	0	Playoff rounds

Source: Paris 2024
29 August 2024
13:30

United States	51–48	Canada
Chuck Aoki – 21; Josh Wheeler – 11; Sarah Adam – 6 Eric Newby – 3 Josh O'Neill – 2 Chuck Melton – 1 Jeff Butler – 1 Lee Fredette – 1	Report	Zak Madell – 31; Cody Caldwell – 5 Rio Kanda Kovac – 3 Mike Whitehead – 3 Trevor Hirschfield – 3 Anthony Létourneau – 2

Grand Palais Éphémère, Paris
29 August 2024
19:30

Japan	55–44	Germany
Daisuke Ikezaki – 18; Katsuya Hashimoto – 17; Yukinobu Ike – 11; Shinichi Shimakawa – 4 Yuki Hasegawa – 2 Hitoshi Ogawa – 1 Shunya Nakamachi – 1 Kae Kurahashi – 1 Seiya Norimatsu – 1	Report	Marco Herbst – 20; Steffen Wecke – 8 Josco Wilke – 8 Britta Kripke – 5 Michael Volter – 3 Jens Sauerbier – 2

Grand Palais Éphémère, Paris

30 August 2024
13:30

United States	42–45	Japan
Chuck Aoki – 19; Sarah Adam – 9 Josh Wheeler – 6 Josh O'Neill – 3 Mason Symons – 2 Chuck Melton – 1 Lee Fredette – 1	Report	Katsuya Hashimoto – 18; Yukinobu Ike – 12; Daisuke Ikezaki – 4 Hitoshi Ogawa – 4 Shunya Nakamachi – 3 Seiya Norimatsu – 1

Grand Palais Éphémère, Paris
30 August 2024
17:30

Germany	47–54	Canada
Marco Herbst – 20; Josco Wilke – 8 Steffen Wecke – 8 Britta Kripke – 5 Michael Volter – 3 Jens Sauerbier – 2	Report	Zachary Madell – 28; Rio Kovac Kanda – 6 Anthony Letourneau – 5 Matthew Debly – 4 Mike Whitehead – 4 Patrice Dagenais – 2 Cody Caldwell – 2 Joel Ewert – 2 Eric Rodrigues Furtado – 1 Trevor Hirschfield – 1

Grand Palais Éphémère, Paris

31 August 2024
11:30

Germany	47–57	United States
Marco Herbst – 18; Josco Wilke – 15; Steffen Wecke – 9 Jens Sauerbier – 1 Britta Kripke – 1 Michael Volter – 1	Report	Chuck Aoki – 34; Sarah Adam – 13; Josh Wheeler – 6 Mason Symons – 4

Grand Palais Éphémère, Paris
31 August 2024
17:30

Canada	46–50	Japan
Zachary Madell – 27; Rio Kovac Kanda – 7 Anthony Letourneau – 5 Cody Caldwell – 5 Trevor Hirschfield – 1	Report	Yukinobu Ike – 15; Daisuke Ikezaki – 14; Katsuya Hashimoto – 11; Shunya Nakamachi – 5 Seiya Norimatsu – 2 Ryuji Kusaba – 1

Grand Palais Éphémère, Paris

==== Group B ====
Pos	Team	Pld	W	D	L	GF	GA	GD	Pts	Qualification
1	Great Britain	3	3	0	0	163	157	+6	6	Semi-finals
2	Australia	3	2	0	1	163	160	+3	4	Semi-finals
3	France (H)	3	1	0	2	155	156	−1	2	Placings rounds
4	Denmark	3	0	0	3	153	161	−8	0	Placings rounds

Source: Paris 2024
(H) Hosts
29 August 2020
11:30

Australia	55–58	Great Britain
Ryley Batt – 36; Chris Bond – 12; Beau Vernon – 3 Ella Sabljak – 1 Andrew Edmondson – 1	Report	Aaron Phipps – 25; Stuart Robinson – 23; Gavin Walker – 3 Jonathan Coggan – 2 Jack Smith – 1 Kieran Flynn – 1

Grand Palais Éphémère, Paris
29 August 2024
17:30

France	53–51	Denmark
Jonathan Hivernat – 29; Sebastien Verdin – 14; Rodolph Jarlan – 5 Matthieu Thiriet – 1 Jordan Ducret – 1 Corentin le Guen – 1	Report	Sebastien Frederiksen – 23; Mark Peters – 12; Leon Jorgensen – 7 Jakob Mortensen – 2 Jesper Krueger – 1

Grand Palais Éphémère, Paris

30 August 2024
11:30

Great Britain	55–53	Denmark
Stuart Robinson – 26; Aaron Phipps – 12; Jamie Stead – 6 Gavin Walker – 4 Nick Cummins – 3 Jonathan Coggan – 2 Kieran Flynn – 2	Report	Mark Peters – 21; Sebastien Frederiksen – 12; Leon Jorgensen – 6 Jakob Mortensen – 5 Kaare Momme Nielsen – 5 Jesper Krueger – 1

Grand Palais Éphémère, Paris
30 August 2024
19:30

Australia	55–53	France
Chris Bond – 27; Ryley Batt – 26; Beau Vernon – 1 Andrew Edmondson – 1	Report	Jonathan Hivernat – 34; Sebastien Verdin – 10; Rodolph Jarlan – 4 Cedric Nankin – 2

Grand Palais Éphémère, Paris

31 August 2024
13:30

Denmark	49–53	Australia
Mark Peters – 22; Sebastian Frederiksen – 11; Leon Jorgensen – 7 Jakob Mortensen – 4 Kaare Momme Nielsen – 3	Report	Ryley Batt – 41; Chris Bond – 11; Beau Vernon – 1

Grand Palais Éphémère, Paris
31 August 2024
19:30

France	49–50	Great Britain
Jonathan Hivernat – 27; Sebastien Verdin – 8 Rodolphe Jarlan – 5 Jordan Ducret – 1	Report	Aaron Phipps – 21; Stuart Robinson – 15; Jack Smith – 3 Jamie Stead – 3

Grand Palais Éphémère, Paris

=== Knockout stage ===
Placing round bracket

Placing Semifinals
01 September
France	54
Germany	48
01 September
Canada	56
Denmark	46

5th place final
02 September
France	53
Canada	50
7th place final
02 September
Denmark	56
Germany	49

Placings round

==== 5th to 8th Semifinals ====
1 September 2024
11:30

Canada	56–46	Denmark
Zachary Madell – 27; Travis Murao – 7 Anthony Letourneau – 7 Cody Caldwell – 5 Rio Kovac Kanda – 2 Joel Ewert – 2 Matthew Debly – 2 Trevor Hirschfield – 1 Patrice Dagenais – 1	Report	Sebastian Frederiksen – 13; Morten Elmholt – 8 Leon Jorgensen – 8 Mark Peters – 7 Kaare Nielsen Momme – 5 Jesper Krueger – 2 Jakob Mortensen – 1 Mikkel Schottel – 1 Kristian Eriksen Bak – 1

Grand Palais Éphémère, Paris
1 September 2024
17:30

France	54–48	Germany
Sebastien Verdin – 20; Jonathan Hivernat – 20; Jordan Ducret – 1 Matthieu Thiriet – 1 Brice Maurel – 1	Report	Josco Wilke – 17; Michael Volter – 8 Steffen Wecke – 7 Marco Herbst – 7 Mascha Mosel – 2 Moritz Brueckner – 2 Florian Bongard – 2 Jens Sauerbier – 1

Grand Palais Éphémère, Paris

==== Seventh place final ====
2 September 2024
11:30

Denmark	56–49	Germany
Sebastian Frederiksen – 22; Mark Peters – 10; Leon Jorgensen – 8 Kaare Nielsen Momme – 5 Morten Elmholt – 3 Kristian Eriksen Bak – 2 Mikkel Schottel – 1	Report	Josco Wilke – 23; Steffen Wecke – 9 Marco Herbst – 8 Michael Volter – 4 Mascha Mosel – 1 Justus Heinrich – 1 Jens Sauerbier – 1

Grand Palais Éphémère, Paris

==== Fifth place final ====
2 September 2024
17:30

Canada	50–53	France
Zachary Madell – 35; Cody Caldwell – 3 Trevor Hirschfield – 3 Anthony Letourneau – 1 Patrice Dagenais – 1 Mike Whitehead – 1	Report	Jonathan Hivernat – 25; Sebastien Verdin – 21; Corentin Guen – 1

Grand Palais Éphémère, Paris

Medal round
Medal Round bracket

Semifinals
01 September
Japan	52
Australia	51
01 September
Great Britain	43
United States	50

Gold medal final
02 September
Japan	48
United States	41
Bronze medal final
02 September
Australia	50
Great Britain	48

==== Medal bracket Semifinals ====
1 September 2024
13:30

Japan	52–51	Australia
Daisuke Ikezaki– 17; Yukinobu Ike– 16; Katsuya Hashimoto– 14; Ryuji Kusaba– 2 Seiya Norimatsu– 1 Hitoshi Ogawa– 1	Report	Ryley Batt – 22; Chris Bond – 18; Beau Vernon – 5 Ella Sabljak – 2 Andrew Edmondson – 2

Grand Palais Éphémère, Paris
1 September 2024
19:30

Great Britain	43–50	United States
Stuart Robinson – 15; Jamie Stead – 7 Aaron Phipps – 7 Jack Smith – 3 Kieran Flynn – 2 Tyler Walker – 2	Report	Chuck Aoki – 18; Josh Wheeler – 14; Sarah Adam – 13; Lee Fredette – 1 Clayton Brackett – 1 Jeff Butler – 1 Mason Symons – 1

Grand Palais Éphémère, Paris

==== Bronze medal final ====
2 September 2024
13:30

Australia	50–48	Great Britain
Ryley Batt – 28; Chris Bond – 15; Beau Vernon – 3 Andrew Edmondson – 2	Report	Stuart Robinson – 28; Aaron Phipps – 14; Jack Smith – 3 Jamie Stead – 1

Grand Palais Éphémère, Paris

==== Gold medal final ====
2 September 2024
19:30

Japan	48–41	United States
Katsuya Hashimoto – 19; Yukinobu Ike – 16; Seiya Norimatsu – 3	Report	Sarah Adam – 14; Chuck Aoki – 14; Josh Wheeler – 7 Eric Newby – 3 Clayton Brackett – 2 Lee Fredette – 1 Mason Symons – 1 Josh O'Neill – 1

Grand Palais Éphémère, Paris

=== Final standings ===
Rank	Team
1st place, gold medalist(s)	Japan
2nd place, silver medalist(s)	United States
3rd place, bronze medalist(s)	Australia
4	Great Britain
5	France
6	Canada
7	Denmark
8	Germany

== See also ==
- Rugby sevens at the 2024 Summer Olympics
