= Chris Bond (wheelchair rugby) =

Australian wheelchair rugby player

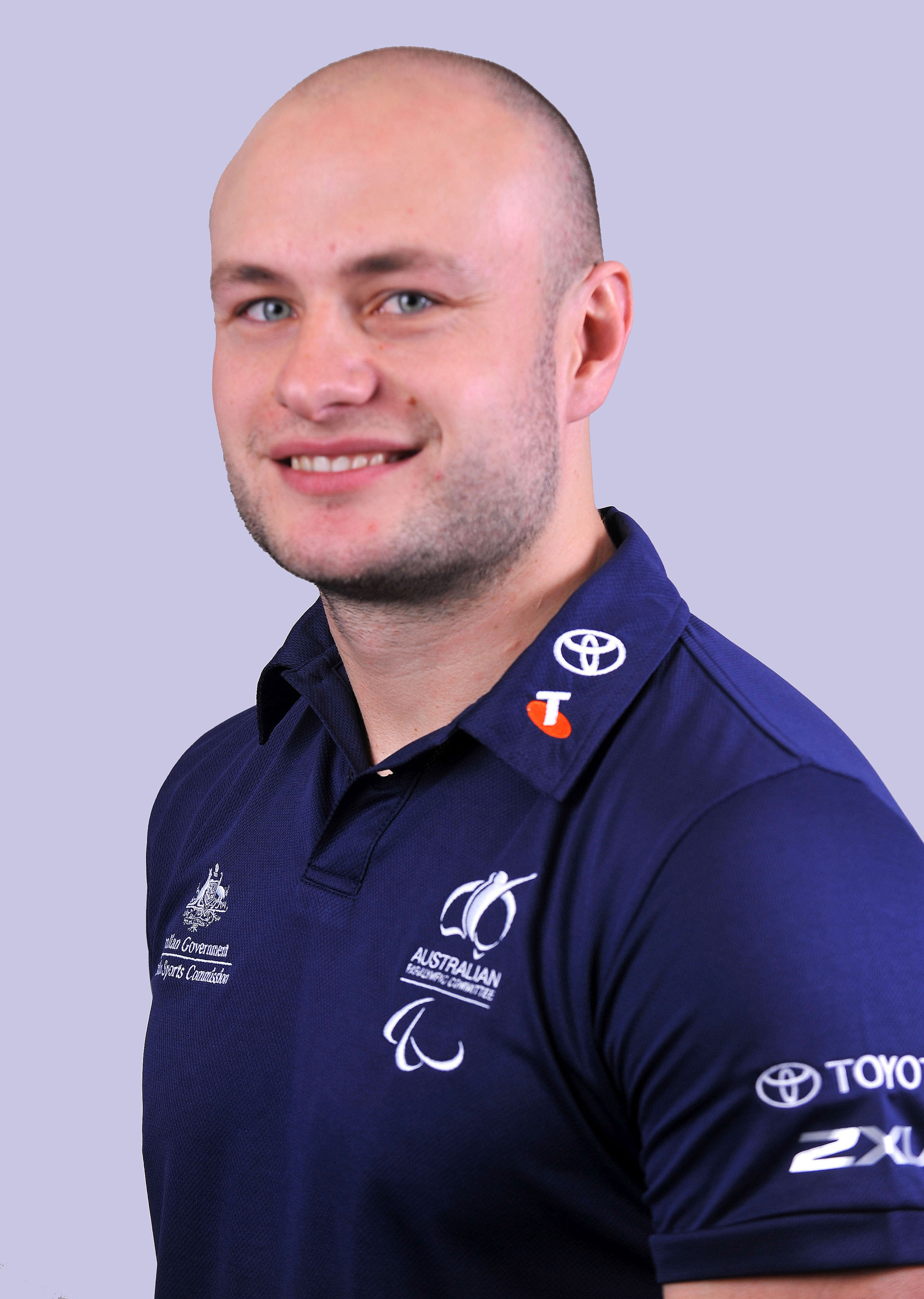
- 2012 Australian Paralympic team portrait of Bond

Personal information
- Full name: Christopher Adam Bond
- Nationality: Australian
- Born: 28 May 1986 (age 40)

Sport
- Country: Australia
- Sport: Wheelchair rugby 3.5
- Club: University of Queensland Club
Medal record
Wheelchair rugby
Paralympic Games
Gold medal – first place	2012 London	Mixed
Gold medal – first place	2016 Rio	Mixed
Bronze medal – third place	2024 Paris	Mixed
World Championships
Gold medal – first place	2014 Odense	Mixed
Silver medal – second place	2018 Sydney	Mixed
Gold medal – first place	2022 Vejle	Mixed
Silver medal – second place	2026 São Paulo	Mixed

Christopher Adam Bond OAM (born 28 May 1986) is an Australian wheelchair rugby player. He has won gold medals at the 2012 London and 2016 Rio Paralympics and a bronze medal at the 2024 Paris Paralympics.

== Personal ==
Bond and his identical twin brother were born on 28 May 1986, and grew up in the Australian Capital Territory. He is missing both legs below his knees, his left wrist and his right four fingers as a result of a severe infection from a flesh eating bacterium he got while also being diagnosed with leukemia when he was nineteen years old. During his rehab, he was often one of the youngest people in gym. While he adjusted to life without his limbs, he started swimming at the pool at the Australian Institute of Sport. When he was young, he played rugby league and was a fan of the Canberra Raiders. Following his illness, he became friends with Clinton Schifcofske, the Raiders former captain. From 2008 to August 2011, he served as a board member of an organisation for young people trying to deal with their own cancer called CanTeen. During his time on the board, he also served as the organisation's national vice president. In 2021, he lived in Baringa, Queensland.

== Wheelchair rugby ==
Bond is a 3.5 point wheelchair rugby player. In 2010, he began looking for a team sport to play and contacted Brad Dubberley, the head coach of the Australia national wheelchair rugby team who encouraged Bond to try the sport based on his existing love of rugby.

Bond made his national team debut at the 2011 Great Britain Cup. Wearing jersey number 10, he represented Australia at the 2012 Canada Cup International Wheelchair Rugby Tournament. In the game against Canada, he and teammate Ryley Batt proved difficult for the Canadians to contain. In May 2012, he participated in a test series against Japan national wheelchair rugby team in Sydney. He scored eighteen goals in the fourth game which Australia won 47 – 44, and twenty goals in the fifth game where Australia won 61 – 55. He played in the London Paralympic test event. He scored 14 points in the game against Canada national wheelchair rugby team that Australia won 56–52 and 20 points in the game against Sweden national wheelchair rugby team that Australia won 65–88. In the finals match against Great Britain national wheelchair rugby team, he scored 22 points in Australia's 71–48 victory. He was selected to represent Australia at the 2012 Summer Paralympics in wheelchair rugby. Going into London, his team was ranked second in the world behind the United States. He was part of the team that won the gold medal. The Australian team went through the five-day tournament undefeated.

Bond was a member of the Australian team that won its first world championship gold medal at the 2014 World Wheelchair Rugby Championships at Odense, Denmark.

He was a member of the team that retained its gold medal at the 2016 Rio Paralympics after defeating the United States 59–58 in the final.

At the 2018 IWRF World Championship in Sydney, Australia, he was a member of the Australian team that won the silver medal after being defeated by Japan 61–62 in the gold medal game.

At the 2020 Summer Paralympics, the Steelers finished fourth after being defeated by Japan 52–60 in the bronze medal game. COVID travel restrictions led to Steelers not having a team training since March 2020 prior to Tokyo.

Bond as Steelers captain won his second world championship gold medal at the 2022 IWRF World Championship in Vejle, Denmark.

At the 2024 Summer Paralympics, he captained the Steelers that won the bronze medal defeating Great Britain 50–48.

He was awarded an Order of Australia Medal in the 2014 Australia Day Honours "for service to sport as a Gold Medallist at the London 2012 Paralympic Games." In November 2016, Bond with Ryan Scott was awarded the Sporting Wheelies and Disabled Association Senior Male Athlete of the Year.

In 2020, he joined the board of Disability Sports Australia.
