= Katsuya Hashimoto =

- Born: May 9, 2002 (age 24) Miharu, Fukushima, Japan
- Occupation: Wheelchair rugby player

Rugby union career
- Position: -
International career
Years	Team	Apps	(Points)
- Japan
Medal record
Representing Japan
Paralympic Games
Wheelchair rugby
Gold medal – first place	2024 Paris	Wheelchair Rugby
Bronze medal – third place	2020 Tokyo	Wheelchair Rugby

Katsuya Hashimoto (橋本 勝也, Hashimoto Katsuya; born May 9, 2002 in Miharu, Fukushima, Japan) is a Japanese wheelchair rugby player who currently plays for the Tohoku Stormers and the Japanese national team.

== Background and career ==
Hashimoto was born with disabilities in his limbs and started playing wheelchair rugby at the age of 16.

In 2021, he was selected as a recommended player for the Japanese national team for the 2020 Summer Paralympics and won a bronze medal.
