= Kae Kurahashi =

- Born: September 15, 1990 (age 36) Kobe, Hyōgo, Japan
- Occupation: Wheelchair rugby player

Rugby union career
- Position: -
International career
Years	Team	Apps	(Points)
- Japan
Medal record
Representing Japan
Paralympic Games
Wheelchair rugby
Gold medal – first place	2024 Paris	Wheelchair Rugby
Bronze medal – third place	2020 Tokyo	Wheelchair Rugby
World Games
Silver medal – second place	2022 Birmingham	Wheelchair Rugby

Kae Kurahashi (倉橋 香衣, Kurahashi Kae; born September 15, 1990 in Kobe, Hyōgo, Japan) is a Japanese wheelchair rugby player who currently plays for Mitsui O.S.K. Lines/AXE and the Japanese national team.

== Background and career ==
Kurahashi continued gymnastics in junior high and high school, and after graduating from high school, she entered Bunkyo University Faculty of Education in Saitama Prefecture with the aim of becoming a teacher, and joined the trampoline club. In her third year at university, she failed a trick while practicing for a trampoline tournament, breaking her neck and damaging her cervical spinal cord. She lost almost all feeling below her collarbone and could only move part of her shoulders and arms. Still, she did not give up and worked hard on her rehabilitation with the aim of returning to university. One day, she encountered wheelchair rugby and was immediately fascinated by its intensity.

In 2016, Kurahashi joined Mitsui O.S.K. Lines after graduating from Bunkyo University Faculty of Education. In 2017, she was the only female player selected for the Japanese national team. In 2021, she was selected as a recommended athlete for the Japanese national team for the 2020 Summer Paralympics, with who she won a bronze medal. In 2024, she was selected as a recommended athlete for the Japanese national team for the 2024 Summer Paralympics.
