= Andrew Edmondson =

Australian wheelchair rugby player

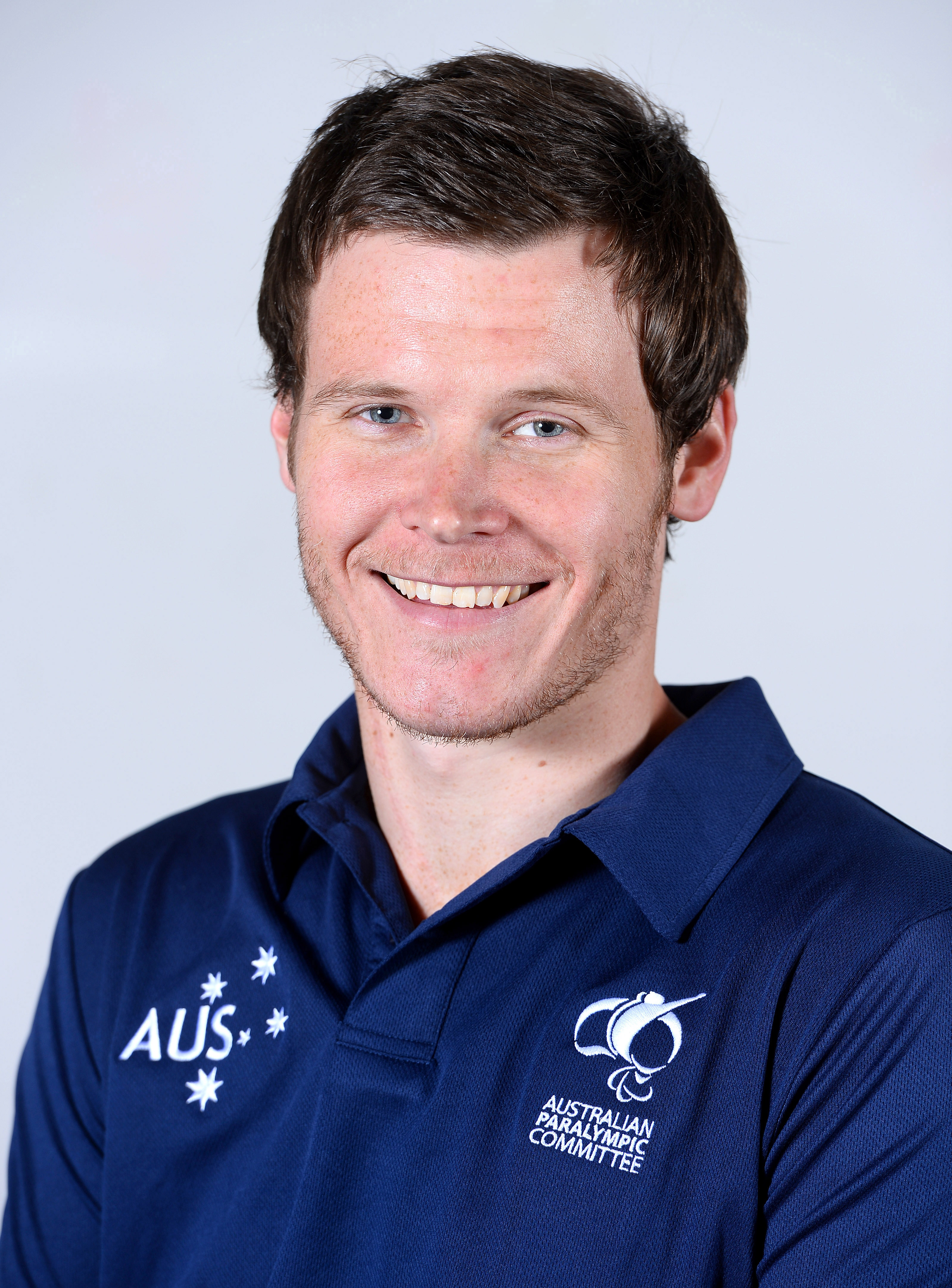
- 2016 Australian Paralympic team portrait of Edmondson

Personal information
- Nickname: Edmo
- Nationality: Australian
- Born: 24 June 1990 (age 36)

Sport
- Country: Australia
- Sport: Wheelchair rugby
- Disability class: 2.0
Medal record
Wheelchair rugby
Representing Australia
Paralympic Games
Gold medal – first place	2016 Rio	Mixed
Bronze medal – third place	2024 Paris	Mixed
World Championships
Silver medal – second place	2018 Sydney	Mixed
Gold medal – first place	2022 Vejle	Mixed
Silver medal – second place	2026 São Paulo	Mixed

Andrew John Edmondson OAM (born 24 June 1990) is an Australian wheelchair rugby player. He won a gold medal at the 2016 Rio Paralympics and a bronze medal at the 2024 Paris Paralympics.

== Personal ==
Edmondson was born on 24 June 1990. His friends call him "Edmo". At the age of 13, he broke his neck whilst surfing at Coogee Beach. At the time, he had received a scholarship to play rugby at Scots College in Sydney. He has a Bachelor of Sports Business from the Australian College of Physical Education. In 2021, he lives in Port Macquarie, New South Wales and is able to train with Ryley Batt. He has business role working for Melrose Wheelchairs and is a part of a public speaking programme through the Australian Institute of Sport in regards to mental health.

== Wheelchair rugby ==
As part of his rehabilitation, he watched a video on wheelchair rugby whilst at the Prince of Wales Hospital and became interested in the sport. In 2004, he attended an Australian Paralympic Committee Come and Try Day. He made his debut for the national team the Australian Steelers in 2014. As of 2016, he has been a member of the NSW Gladiators for 10 years and captained the team for the last two years. In 2015, he played in the United States wheelchair rugby competition.

He was a member of the team that retained its gold medal at the 2016 Rio Paralympics after defeating the United States 59–58 in the final. He was awarded the Order of Australia Medal in 2017.

At the 2018 IWRF World Championship in Sydney, Australia, he was a member of the Australian team that won the silver medal after being defeated by Japan 61–62 in the gold medal game.

Edmondson his won first world championship gold medal at the 2022 IWRF World Championship in Vejle, Denmark, when Australia defeated the United States .

At the 2024 Summer Paralympics, he was a member of the Steelers that won the bronze medal defeating Great Britain 50–48.
