= Yuki Hasegawa (wheelchair rugby) =

- Born: October 5, 1992 (age 34) Hiroshima, Hiroshima, Japan
- University: Rissho University
- Occupation: Wheelchair rugby player

Rugby union career
- Position: -
International career
Years	Team	Apps	(Points)
- Japan
Medal record
Representing Japan
Paralympic Games
Wheelchair rugby
Gold medal – first place	2024 Paris	Wheelchair Rugby
Bronze medal – third place	2020 Tokyo	Wheelchair Rugby
World Games
Silver medal – second place	2022 Birmingham	Wheelchair Rugby

Yuki Hasegawa (長谷川 勇基, Hasegawa Yuki; born October 5, 1992 in Hiroshima, Hiroshima, Japan) is a Japanese wheelchair rugby player who currently plays for Société Générale Securities and the Japanese national team.

== Background and career ==
Hasegawa graduated from Hiroshima Water Polo Club and Hiroshima Johoku Junior and Senior High School. He joined the team in the fifth grade of elementary school and participated in the national tournament in his third year of junior high school. In his third year of high school, he fell and injured his spine, leaving him with disabilities in both his hands and legs. He began playing wheelchair rugby at the age of 20.

In 2021, Hasegawa was selected as a recommended player for the Japanese national team for the 2020 Summer Paralympics and won a bronze medal.
