= Ryuji Kusaba =

Ryuji Kasuba
- Born: December 10, 2000 (age 25) Asakura, Fukuoka, Japan
- Occupation: Wheelchair rugby player

Rugby union career
- Position: -
International career
Years	Team	Apps	(Points)
- Japan
Medal record
Representing Japan
Paralympic Games
Wheelchair rugby
Gold medal – first place	2024 Paris	Wheelchair Rugby

Ryuji Kusaba (草場 龍治, Kusaba Ryuji; born December 10, 2000 in Asakura, Fukuoka, Japan) is a Japanese wheelchair rugby player and a member of the Japanese national team.

In 2024, Kusaba was selected as a recommended athlete for the Japanese national team for the 2024 Summer Paralympics, with whom he won a gold medal.
