= Eric Newby (wheelchair rugby) =

American wheelchair rugby player

Personal information
- Born: April 8, 1988 (age 38) St. Louis, Missouri, U.S.
- Education: Maryville University

Sport
- Sport: Wheelchair rugby
- Disability class: 2.0
Medal record
Wheelchair rugby
Representing the United States
Paralympic Games
Silver medal – second place	2016 Rio de Janeiro	Team
Silver medal – second place	2020 Tokyo	Team
Silver medal – second place	2024 Paris	Team
World Championships
Silver medal – second place	2022 Vejle	Team
Bronze medal – third place	2014 Odense	Team
Parapan American Games
Gold medal – first place	2019 Lima	Team
Gold medal – first place	2023 Santiago	Team

Eric Newby (born April 8, 1988) is an American wheelchair rugby player and member of the United States national wheelchair rugby team.

== Career ==
Newby represented the United States at the 2019 Parapan American Games and won a gold medal in wheelchair rugby.

He again represented the United States at the 2023 Parapan American Games and won a gold medal in wheelchair rugby. As a result, Team USA automatically qualified for the 2024 Summer Paralympics. On April 30, 2024, he was selected to represent the United States at the 2024 Summer Paralympics. He will serve as co-captain along with Chuck Aoki.
