= Josh Wheeler (wheelchair rugby) =

American wheelchair rugby player

Personal information
- Born: April 14, 1980 (age 46) Sacramento, California, U.S.
- Home town: Tucson, Arizona, U.S.

Sport
- Sport: Wheelchair rugby
- Disability class: 2.5
Medal record
Wheelchair rugby
Representing the United States
Paralympic Games
Silver medal – second place	2016 Rio de Janeiro	Team
Silver medal – second place	2020 Tokyo	Team
Silver medal – second place	2024 Paris	Team
World Championships
Silver medal – second place	2022 Vejle	Team
Bronze medal – third place	2014 Odense	Team
Bronze medal – third place	2018 Sydney	Team
Parapan American Games
Gold medal – first place	2019 Lima	Team
Silver medal – second place	2015 Toronto	Team

Josh Wheeler (born April 14, 1980) is an American wheelchair rugby player and member of the United States national wheelchair rugby team.

== Career ==
Wheeler made the United States Wheelchair Rugby team in 2010 and represented the United States at many tournaments from 2010 through 2024.

He was selected to represent the United States at the 2016 Rio de Janeiro Summer Paralympics, 2020 Tokyo Summer Paralympics and 2024 Summer Paralympics.

== Personal life ==
In 2006, Wheeler was hit by a car while riding his motorcycle and broke his neck, but miraculously survived.
