= Fredette =

Fredette is a surname. Notable people with the surname include:

- Jimmer Fredette (born 1989), American basketball player
- Kenneth Fredette (born 1964), American politician
- Lee Fredette (born 1982), American wheelchair rugby player
