= Sarah Adam =

American wheelchair rugby player

Personal information
- Born: December 17, 1990 (age 35) Naperville, Illinois, U.S.
- Education: Washington University in St. Louis (OTD); Augustana College (BS)

Sport
- Sport: Wheelchair rugby
- Disability class: 2.5
Medal record
Wheelchair rugby
Representing the United States
Paralympic Games
Silver medal – second place	2024 Paris	Team
World Championships
Silver medal – second place	2022 Vejle	Team
Parapan American Games
Gold medal – first place	2023 Santiago	Team
Americas Championship
Gold medal – first place	2022 Medellín	Team

Sarah Adam (born December 17, 1990) is an American wheelchair rugby player and occupational therapy professor from Naperville, Illinois.

== Rugby career ==
Adam was a part of the United States national wheelchair rugby team lineups that won gold at the 2022 Americas Championship, silver at the 2022 World Championship, and gold at the 2023 Parapan American Games, making her the first American woman to win gold in the last of these events.

On April 30, 2024, Adam was officially named to the U.S. Paralympic Wheelchair Rugby Team roster for the 2024 Summer Paralympics, making her the first-ever woman to represent the United States in wheelchair rugby at a Paralympic Games. At the games, she became the first American woman to score in Paralympic wheelchair rugby, and the U.S. Paralympic Wheelchair Rugby Team, including her, won the silver medal. As of those Paralympics, Adam is a 2.5-classified player in the wheelchair rugby classification system.

== Academic career ==
Adam earned her bachelor's degree at Augustana College in Illinois and her doctorate in occupational therapy at Washington University in St. Louis.

She is now an associate professor of occupational science and occupational therapy at Saint Louis University. Her research interests include, per her Saint Louis University faculty profile, "enhancing independence and participation of individuals with disability through community-based exercise and adaptive sports", and she is a member of the American Occupational Therapy Association.
