= Beau Vernon =

Australian wheelchair rugby player

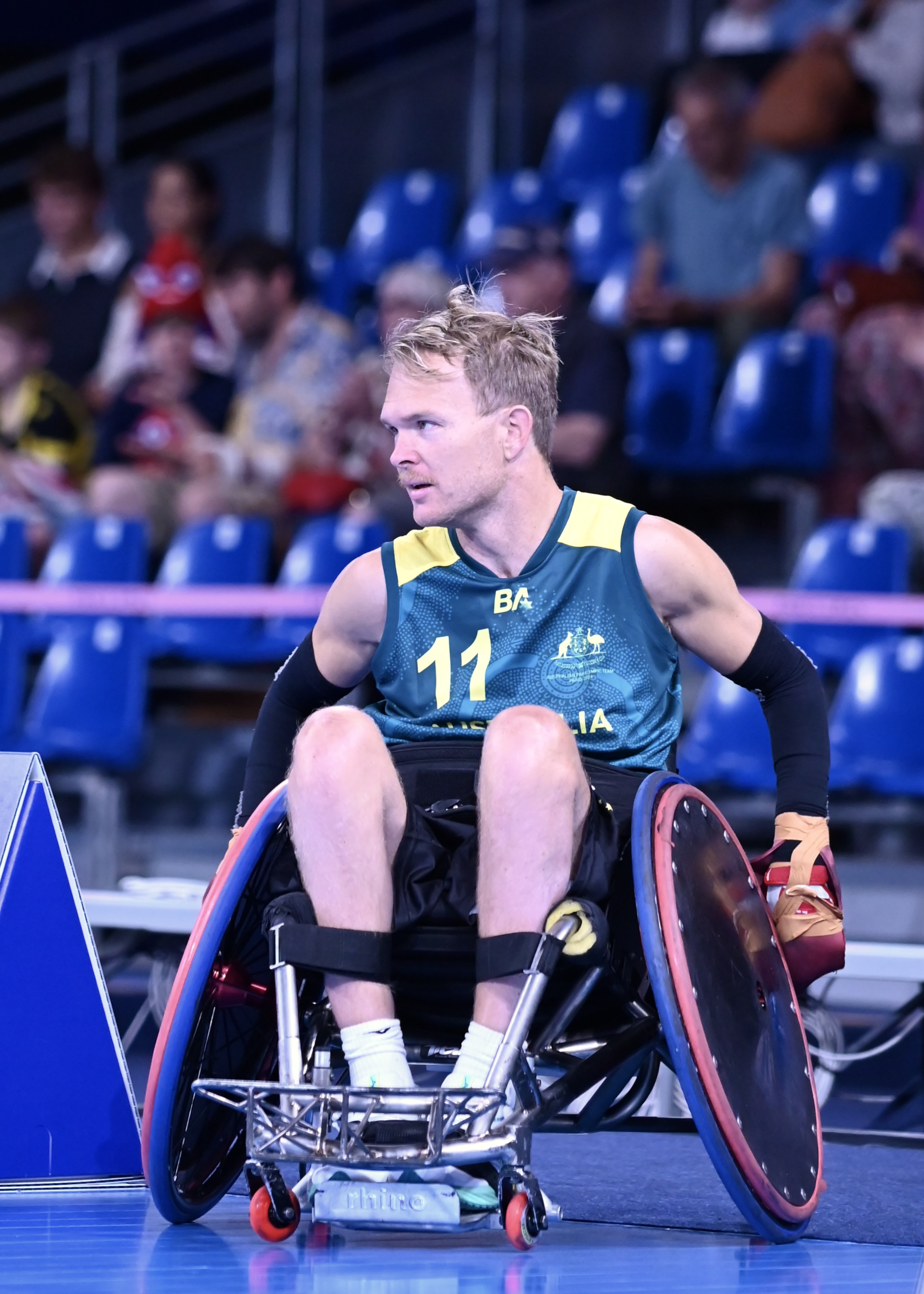
- Vernon at the 2024 Summer Paralympics

Personal information
- Nationality: Australian
- Born: 5 December 1988 (age 37)

Sport
- Country: Australia
- Sport: Wheelchair basketball
- Disability class: 0.5 (rugby)
- Club: University of Queensland Club
Medal record
Wheelchair rugby
Representing Australia
Paralympic Games
Bronze medal – third place	2024 Paris	Mixed
World Championships
Silver medal – second place	2026 São Paulo	Mixed

Beau Vernon (born 5 December 1988) is an Australian wheelchair rugby player. He won a bronze medal with the Steelers at the 2024 Summer Paralympics.

== Personal ==
Vernon is from Phillip Island, Victoria. In June 2012, at the age of 23, his head was hit during a game of Australian football at Leongatha, Victoria and this resulted in him becoming a quadriplegic. He spent seven months at Royal Talbot Rehabilitation Hospital in Kew, Melbourne. In 2023, he moved to the Sunshine Coast in Queensland with his wife, Lucy, and three children – Layla, Joey and Ollie. He has completed a business degree at RMIT.

== Wheelchair rugby ==
Prior to his football injury, he was successful at state level athletics and basketball. He was the youngest player in Gippsland Power’s TAC Cup 2005 premiership team, playing alongside Scott Pendlebury, Dale Thomas and Xavier Ellis. In 2014, he was appointed coach of Leongatha Football Club in the Gippsland League and they went on to win the premiership in his third year of coaching. He has also coached Phillip Island Seniors to two premierships.

He was introduced to wheelchair rugby through Australian Paralympian Nazem Erdem, a gold and silver medallist. Vernon is a 0.5 player and is a member of the University of Queensland Rugby Club. He was a member of Steelers that won the 2024 WWR Paralympic Qualification Tournament, Wellington, New Zealand and has been selected for the 2024 Summer Paralympics.

At the 2024 Summer Paralympics, he was a member of the Steelers that won the bronze medal defeating Great Britain 50–48.
