= Wheelchair rugby at the 2019 Parapan American Games =

- Venue: Lima
- Dates: 23–27 August 2019
- Competitors: 72 from 6 nations

Wheelchair rugby at the 2019 Parapan American Games in Lima, Peru will start from 23 to 27 August. The winner of the competition will automatically qualify to the 2020 Summer Paralympics.

== Medalists ==
Event	Gold	Silver	Bronze
Mixed tournament	United States	Canada	Colombia

== Team roster ==
Argentina; Jose Arhancet; Lucas Camussi; Matias Cardozo; Lautaro Fernandez; Juan Herrera; Mariano Santoro; Juan Bandini; Fernando Canumil; Emanuel Castro; Mariano Gastaldi; Brian Nascimento; Marcelo Ullua	Brazil; Davi Abreu; Julio Braz; Guilherme Camargo; Gabriel Feitosa; Alexandre Giuriato; Daniel Goncalves; Jose Guenther; Jose Higino; Rafael Hoffmann; Lucas Junqueira; Alexandre Taniguchi; Gildon Virzma	Canada; Cody Caldwell; Patrice Dagenais; Eric Furtado Rodrigues; Trevor Hirschfield; Mélanie Labelle; Zak Madell; Travis Murao; Benjamin Perkins; Patrice Simard; Shayne Smith; Branden Troutman; Mike Whitehead
United States; Chuck Aoki; Jeff Butler; Chad Cohn; Ernie Chun; Jake Daily; Joe Delagrave; Lee Fredette; Ray Hennagir; Eric Newby; Alejandro Pabon; Adam Scaturro; Josh Wheeler	Chile; Jonatan Alarcon; Piero Arevalo; Alexis Barraza; Jeny Barraza; Victor Bocaz; Francisco Cayulef; Ricardo Diaz; Cristopher Flores; Jonathan Flores; Christian Madariaga; Juan Rodriguez; Diego Romero	Colombia; Paola Martineez; Jhon Orozco; Moises Alonso; Carlos Neme(C); Disledy Gonzalez; Cristian Amaya; Uriel Rodriguez; Julian Vargas; Esneider Cardenas; Helio Hurtado; Manuel Mongua; Anderson Munoz

== Results ==
Round robin

23 August 2019
8:00

Canada	60 - 24	Argentina

23 August 2019
9:45

United States	60 - 16	Chile

23 August 2019
11:30

Brazil	48 - 41	Colombia

24 August 2019
8:00

United States	48 - 7	Argentina

24 August 2019
10:00

Canada	58 - 43	Brazil

24 August 2019
12:00

Colombia	62 - 26	Chile

24 August 2019
15:00

United States	55 - 35	Brazil

24 August 2019
17:00

Canada	64 - 45	Colombia

24 August 2019
19:00

Argentina	56 - 47	Chile

25 August 2019
8:00

United States	53 - 34	Colombia

25 August 2019
10:00

Canada	70 - 34	Chile

25 August 2019
12:00

Brazil	65 - 21	Argentina

25 August 2019
15:00

United States	54 - 51	Canada

25 August 2019
17:00

Brazil	76 - 13	Chile

25 August 2019
19:00

Colombia	51 - 37	Argentina

Semi-finals

26 August 2019
15:00

Canada	56 - 46	Brazil

26 August 2019
17:00

United States	50 - 26	Colombia

5/6th classification match

26 August 2019
19:00

Argentina	52 - 38	Chile

Bronze medal match

27 August 2019
10:00

Brazil	43–46	Colombia

Gold medal match

27 August 2019
12:00

Canada	47–58	United States

== See also ==
- Rugby sevens at the 2019 Pan American Games
- Wheelchair rugby at the 2020 Summer Paralympics
