= Ryley Batt =

Australian wheelchair rugby player

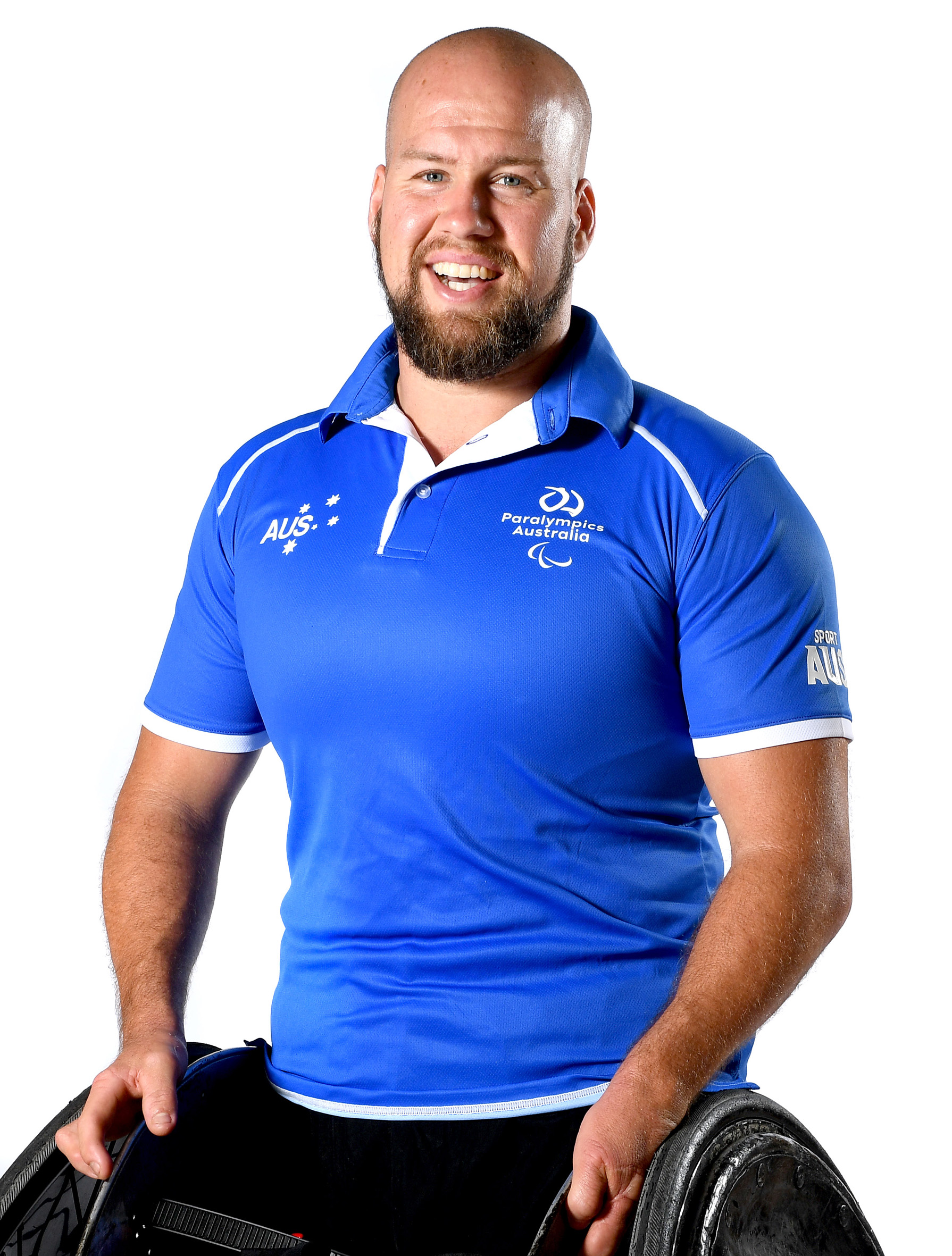
- Ryley Batt in 2020

Personal information
- Born: 22 May 1989 (age 37)

Sport
- Sport: Wheelchair rugby
- Disability class: 3.5 (later 3.0)
- Club: Hunter Wildfires
- Team: Australian Steelers (2003–current)
Medal record
Paralympic Games
Gold medal – first place	2012 London	Mixed
Gold medal – first place	2016 Rio	Mixed
Silver medal – second place	2008 Beijing	Mixed
Bronze medal – third place	2024 Paris	Mixed
World Championships
Silver medal – second place	2010 Vancouver	Mixed
Gold medal – first place	2014 Odense	Mixed
Silver medal – second place	2018 Sydney	Mixed
Gold medal – first place	2022 Vejle	Mixed
Silver medal – second place	2026 São Paulo	Mixed

Ryley Douglas Batt, OAM (born 22 May 1989) is an Australian wheelchair rugby player. He has won two gold, one silver medal and one bronze medal at six Paralympic Games.

== Biography ==
Ryley Douglas Batt was born on 22 May 1989 without legs and had surgery to separate his webbed fingers. Up to the age of twelve, he did not use a wheelchair, preferring to move around on a skateboard.

He was convinced to use a wheelchair when he saw a demonstration of wheelchair rugby at his school, and took up the sport shortly afterwards in that year. He first participated in the Australian Steelers in 2002. He was part of the national team at the 2004 Athens Games, where he was the youngest Paralympic rugby player in the world at the age of 15, the 2008 Beijing Games, where the team won a silver medal, and the 2012 London Games, when the team won a gold medal.

From 2006 to 2010, he was the national team's most valuable player. He competed in the 2010 World Wheelchair Rugby Championships, where his team won a silver medal, and he won the most valuable player award. He was a member of the Australian team that won its first world championship gold medal at the 2014 World Wheelchair Rugby Championships at Odense, Denmark.

He was a member of the team that retained its gold medal at the 2016 Rio Paralympics after defeating the United States 59–58 in the final.

At the 2018 IWRF World Championship in Sydney, he was a member of the Australian team that won the silver medal after being defeated by Japan 61–62 in the gold medal game. He was the only Australian named in the 2018 IWRF World Championship All-Tournament Team.

At the 2020 Summer Paralympics, the Steelers finished fourth after being defeated by Japan 52–60 in the bronze medal game. COVID travel restrictions led to the Steelers not having a team training session since March 2020 prior to Tokyo.

Batt won his second world championship gold medal at the 2022 IWRF World Championship in Vejle, Denmark. He was named the Most Valuable Player and was also the leading scorer, crossing the line 231 times for Australia.

At the 2024 Summer Paralympics, he was a member of the Steelers that won the bronze medal defeating Great Britain 50–48. After the Games, he underwent surgery to reconstruct his left elbow and left shoulder and he was reclassified as a 3.0 player.

He lives in the New South Wales city of Port Macquarie, and leads the New South Wales Gladiators and the San Diego Sharp Edge in the United States.

== Recognition ==
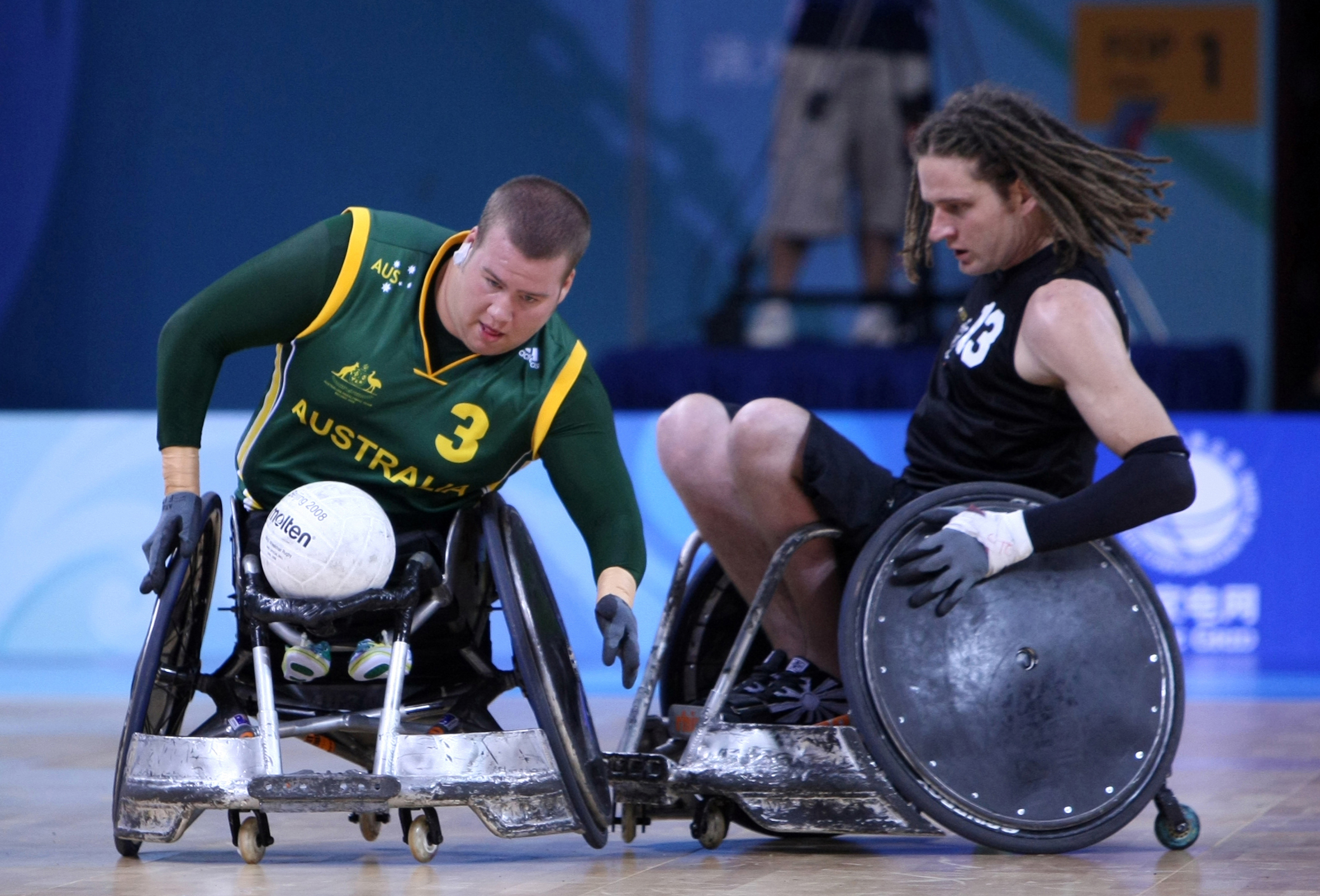
Batt at the 2008 Summer Paralympics

Batt was a finalist for the 2012 Australian Paralympian of the Year. He was awarded an Order of Australia Medal in the 2014 Australia Day Honours "for service to sport as a Gold Medallist at the London 2012 Paralympic Games."

In November 2014, he won three awards at the New South Wales Institute of Sport Awards – ClubsNSW Male Athlete of the Year, Office of Communities, Sport and Recreation Regional Athlete of the Year and Quest Serviced Apartments Team Athlete of the Year.

In November 2019, Batt with Daniela Di Toro was named co-captain of the Australian Team at the 2020 Tokyo Paralympics. On 23 August 2021, Batt and Di Toro were announced as the flagbearers for the Australian team for the Tokyo 2020 Paralympics opening ceremony. He is featured in the 2020 documentary film Rising Phoenix.
