= Lee Fredette =

American wheelchair rugby player

Personal information
- Born: November 11, 1982 (age 43) Port Jefferson, New York, U.S.
- Education: University of Miami

Sport
- Sport: Wheelchair rugby
- Disability class: 1.0
Medal record
Wheelchair rugby
Representing the United States
Paralympic Games
| Silver medal – second place | 2016 Rio de Janeiro | Team |
| Silver medal – second place | 2020 Tokyo | Team |
| Silver medal – second place | 2024 Paris | Team |
World Championships
| Silver medal – second place | 2022 Vejle | Team |
| Bronze medal – third place | 2018 Sydney | Team |
Parapan American Games
| Gold medal – first place | 2019 Lima | Team |
| Gold medal – first place | 2023 Santiago | Team |

Lee Fredette (born November 11, 1982) is an American wheelchair rugby player and member of the United States national wheelchair rugby team.

== Career ==
Fredette represented the United States at the 2019 Parapan American Games and won a gold medal in wheelchair rugby.

He again represented the United States at the 2023 Parapan American Games and won a gold medal in wheelchair rugby. As a result, Team USA automatically qualified for the 2024 Summer Paralympics. On April 30, 2024, he was selected to represent the United States at the 2024 Summer Paralympics.

== Personal life ==
On April 20, 2002, Fredette was paralyzed from the chest down when he fell head-first from his dirt bike while riding in the Hickory Bend parkland.
