= Great Britain Wheelchair Rugby =

- Sport: Wheelchair Rugby
- Jurisdiction: National
- Abbreviation: GBWR
- Founded: 2007
- Affiliation: IWRF
- Headquarters: Twickenham Stadium
- CEO: Jason Brisbane
- Operating income: £533.78k

Official website
- www.gbwr.org.uk
- (United Kingdom)

The Great Britain Wheelchair Rugby Limited (GBWR) is a non-profit organisation and the governing body for wheelchair rugby in Great Britain. The organisation represents Great Britain in IWRF and the national wheelchair rugby team in the British Paralympic Association.

The organisation is responsible for the selection and training of the team that represent Great Britain in international tournaments, including the IWRF World Championships and Games of the Paralympiad and the qualifiers therefore, as well as for the promotion of the sport amongst prospective players, spectators, and fans.
