= Clayton Brackett =

American wheelchair rugby player

Personal information
- Born: January 15, 1993 (age 33) Irvine, California, U.S.
- Education: University of Alabama at Birmingham

Sport
- Sport: Wheelchair rugby
- Disability class: 2.5
Medal record
Wheelchair rugby
Representing the United States
Paralympic Games
Silver medal – second place	2024 Paris	Team
Parapan American Games
Gold medal – first place	2023 Santiago	Team

Clayton Brackett (born January 15, 1993) is an American wheelchair rugby player and member of the United States national wheelchair rugby team. He represented the United States at the 2024 Summer Paralympics.

== Career ==
Brackett represented the United States at the 2023 Parapan American Games and won a gold medal in wheelchair rugby. As a result, Team USA automatically qualified for the 2024 Summer Paralympics. On April 30, 2024, he was selected to represent the United States at the 2024 Summer Paralympics.
