= Mason Symons =

American wheelchair rugby player

Personal information
- Born: February 9, 1989 (age 37)
- Home town: Hershey, Pennsylvania, U.S.

Sport
- Sport: Wheelchair rugby
- Disability class: 2.0
Medal record
Wheelchair rugby
Representing the United States
Paralympic Games
| Silver medal – second place | 2024 Paris | Team |
Parapan American Games
| Gold medal – first place | 2023 Santiago | Team |

Mason Symons (born February 9, 1989) is an American wheelchair rugby player and member of the United States national wheelchair rugby team. He represented the United States at the 2024 Summer Paralympics.

== Career ==
Symons represented the United States at the 2023 Parapan American Games and won a gold medal in wheelchair rugby. As a result, Team USA automatically qualified for the 2024 Summer Paralympics. On April 30, 2024, he was selected to represent the United States at the 2024 Summer Paralympics.

== Personal life ==
In 2009, Symons was serving in the Pennsylvania National Guard when he was involved in a motorcycle accident and became paralyzed due to a spinal cord injury.
