= Josh O'Neill =

American wheelchair rugby player

Personal information
- Full name: Joshua O'Neill
- Born: January 18, 1988 (age 38)
- Home town: Colorado Springs, Colorado, U.S.
- Education: University of Arizona

Sport
- Sport: Wheelchair rugby
- Disability class: 1.5
Medal record
Wheelchair rugby
Representing the United States
Paralympic Games
Silver medal – second place	2024 Paris	Team
World Championships
Silver medal – second place	2022 Vejle	Team
Parapan American Games
Gold medal – first place	2023 Santiago	Team

Joshua O'Neill (born January 18, 1988) is an American wheelchair rugby player and member of the United States national wheelchair rugby team.

== Career ==
O'Neill represented the United States at the 2023 Parapan American Games and won a gold medal in wheelchair rugby. As a result, Team USA automatically qualified for the 2024 Summer Paralympics. On April 30, 2024, he was selected to represent the United States at the 2024 Summer Paralympics.

== Personal life ==
O'Neill was involved in a motor vehicle accident on his 16th birthday which resulted in a spinal cord injury.
