= Grand Palais Éphémère =

Temporary exhibition space in Paris

- Grand Palais éphémère
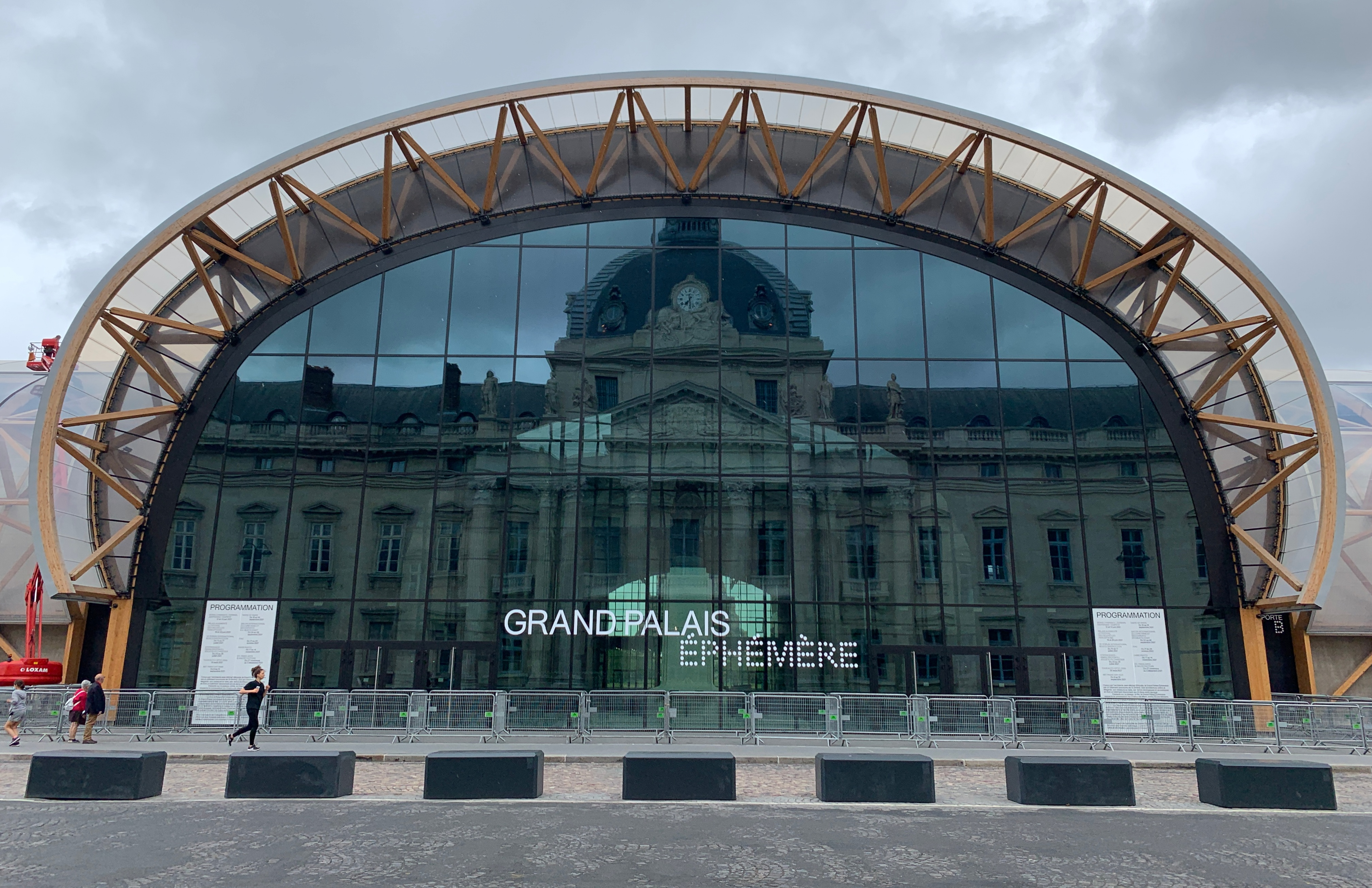
- The Grand Palais Éphémère seen from the Champ de Mars
- Interactive map of Grand Palais Éphémère
- Location: Avenue Pierre Loti, 75007 Paris, France
- Coordinates: 48.853001°N 2.302726°E
- Type: exhibition hall

Website
- Olympics 2024

The Grand Palais éphémère is a temporary exhibition hall in the Champ de Mars by architect Jean-Michel Wilmotte. The 10,000 m^{2} hall opened in 2021 and is meant to be dismantled in 2024. Its purpose is to host exhibitions while the Grand Palais is being renovated for the 2024 Summer Olympics. The Grand Palais Éphémère will host the judo and wrestling events at the 2024 Summer Olympics, and judo and wheelchair rugby at the 2024 Summer Paralympics. GL events, the events organisation major, is the concessionaire for the ephemeral Grand Palais. It maintains and manages the resale of the building.

In July 2021, it hosted the 10th edition of the forum for timber engineers and architects at the International Forum Bois of Construction.
