= Kylie Grimes =

British para-athlete (born 1987)

Kylie Grimes MBE (born 7 December 1987 in Aldershot, Hampshire) is a British para-athlete. She is one of two women, along with Bieke Ketelbuters, who competed on wheelchair rugby teams at the 2012 Summer Paralympics. She was part of the GB team to win their first ever gold in the event, at the 2020 Summer Paralympics in Tokyo, Japan, beating the USA 54–49. In doing so she became the first woman of any country to win a Paralympic gold medal in the sport.

== Early life ==
Grimes became disabled after a diving accident at a friend's swimming pool. She attempted to sue over the matter but was unsuccessful. She trains 12 hours a week. She considers herself positive and was surprised to be named to the British team.

== Career ==
Grimes began playing wheelchair rugby in 2008. She is a gold medallist wheelchair rugby winner, the only female on the paralympics GB team, at Paralympics Tokyo 2020/2021.

Grimes was appointed Member of the Order of the British Empire (MBE) in the 2022 New Year Honours for services to wheelchair rugby.

== Wheelchair rugby competition history ==
Grimes competed for Great Britain at the following championship events:

- 2015 World Para Athletics Championships Doha F51 Club (4th) and F52 100m (4th)
- 2016 European Para Athletics Championships Grosseto Italy F51 Club (4th)
- 2016 Rio Paralympics F51 Club (4th)
- 2017 World Para Athletics London F51 Club (5th)
- 2018 European Para Athletics Championship Berlin (3rd)
