= Jack Smith (wheelchair rugby) =

Wheelchair rugby player (born 1991)

Jack Smith MBE
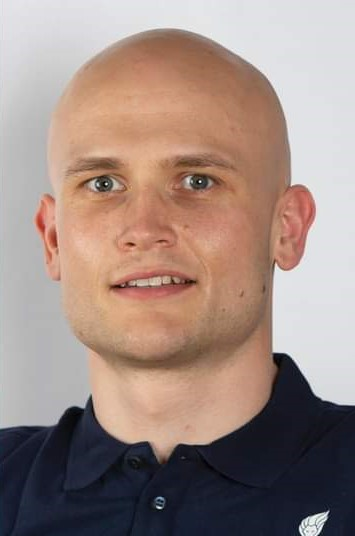
- Jack Smith, member of the GB Wheelchair Rugby team at Tokyo Paralympics 2020.

Personal information
- Full name: Jack Smith
- Nationality: British
- Born: 19 June 1991 (age 35) Stockton-on-Tees, England
- Home town: Sedgefield

Sport
- Sport: Wheelchair rugby
- Disability class: 0.5
- Club: North East Bulls
- Team: (United Kingdom) Great Britain

Achievements and titles
- Paralympic finals: Tokyo 2020
Medal record
Paralympic Games
Gold medal – first place	2020 Tokyo	Mixed

Jack Dalziel Smith (born 19 June 1991) is a British wheelchair rugby athlete. He was a member of the Great Britain national wheelchair rugby team at the 2020 Summer Paralympics in Tokyo, when the team won the gold medal.

== Biography ==
In 2008, at age 16, Smith was diagnosed with Hodgkin lymphoma. A few weeks after this diagnosis, while playing rugby for Billingham RUFC, he was injured in a ruck incident. He sustained a fracture-dislocation of several vertebrae and spinal cord compression, which resulted in paralysis from the chest down. He had spinal surgery at North Tees Hospital and spent three months' rehab at James Cook University Hospital spinal unit.

Just over a year later, Smith was back playing rugby, now in a wheelchair. He took up the sport in 2009 at the North East Bulls club, the region's only wheelchair team.

He moved on to Leicester Tigers Wheelchair Rugby club, and eventually to a place on the Great Britain team, making his debut in 2015. Following his selection for the team, he said: "This has been my dream for six or seven years and right now I'm so excited. My parents, brother, sister and my girlfriend have been so supportive and, although it's not possible for them to watch, they are over the moon for me."

Following Great Britain's triumph at the Covid-delayed 2020 Paralympics, Smith was appointed Member of the Order of the British Empire (MBE) in the 2022 New Year Honours for services to wheelchair rugby.

Smith represented Great Britain at the 2024 Paralympic Games in Paris. He was voted Best in Class at the 2026 Wheelchair Rugby World Championship. He has over 100 representative caps.
