= World Wheelchair Rugby =

International rugby governing body

World Wheelchair Rugby (WWR)
- Formation: 1993, 2010
- Type: Sport federation
- Location: Sheffield, United Kingdom
- Secretary General: Eron Main
- President: Richard Allcroft
- Key people: Board - Juan Pablo Salazar Salamanca, Gail Hamamoto, Seonh Sin Han, Martin Richard, Steve Loader, Shae Graham
- Staff: 47 in 2025
- Website: Web

World Wheelchair Rugby (WWR) is the international governing body for the sport of wheelchair rugby. Since 1993 to 2021 its name was International Wheelchair Rugby Federation (IWRF). WWR is a volunteer-run organisation that supervises the international competitions and development of wheelchair rugby.

== History ==
It was created in 1993 as a sport section of the International Stoke Mandeville Wheelchair Sports Federation (ISMWSF). (The ISMWSF is known as the International Wheelchair and Amputee Sports Federation (IWAS) since 2005). WWR became an independent sport federation on 1 January 2010.

WWR puts on a number of international wheelchair rugby competitions such as the WWR European Championship, WWR Americas Championship, WWR Asia/Oceania Championship, Rugbymania, and more every year.

== Rename ==
International Wheelchair Rugby Federation (IWRF) has rebranded to World Wheelchair Rugby (WWR). This change was announced during the Tokyo 2020 Paralympic Games and is part of a larger effort to modernize the organization and make it more engaging. The new branding includes a new logo and a focus on the competitive aspect of the sport, emphasizing that the athletes are "here to win" rather than just to inspire.

== WWR and the Paralympics ==
WWR has been playing a key role in organising wheelchair at the Paralympics. Wheelchair Rugby was brought to the 1996 Atlanta Games as a demonstration sport and then became a full sport at the 2006 Sydney Paralympic Games. Since then, Wheelchair Rugby has been played at every Paralympic Games.

== World Ranking ==
35 nations in ranking on 21 July 2025.

== Members ==
47 Members in 2025:

1. Americas Region - 9+2
2. Asia-Oceania Region - 12+5 (10 from Asia / 4 from Africa / 3 from Oceania)
3. European Region - 17+2

== Variants ==
1. Paralympic Wheelchair Rugby
2. Low Point Rugby
3. Wheelchair Rugby 5s

== Events ==
- Wheelchair rugby at the Summer Paralympics
- Wheelchair rugby at the 2022 World Games
- Wheelchair Rugby World Championships
- IWRF Americas Championship
- IWRF European Championship
- IWRF Asia-Oceania Championship

== See also ==
- International Wheelchair and Amputee Sports Federation (IWAS)
- Invictus Games
