= Wheelchair rugby at the 2022 World Games =

- Dates: 14–17 July 2022
- No. of events: 1

The wheelchair rugby competition at the 2022 World Games took place in July 2022, in Birmingham, Alabama in United States. Originally scheduled to take place in July 2021, the Games were rescheduled for July 2022 as a result of the 2020 Summer Olympics and Paralympics postponement due to the COVID-19 pandemic. Wheelchair rugby competition made its debut on The World Games programme and also was the first paralympic sport at the World Games program. José Perurena, IWGA President, stated, "In Birmingham, for the first time, invitational sports were no longer presented separately but were also part of the official programme." As also conducted at the Paralympic Games, wheelchair rugby is a mixed team sport for male and female quadriplegic athletes

== Participating nations ==
- Canada
- Germany
- Great Britain
- Japan
- Switzerland
- United States

== Medal table ==
* Host nation (United States)

Rank	Nation	Gold	Silver	Bronze	Total
1	Great Britain	1	0	0	1
2	Japan	0	1	0	1
3	Germany	0	0	1	1
Totals (3 entries)		1	1	1	3

== Medalists ==
Event	Gold	Silver	Bronze
Mixed tournament	Great Britain; David Cowling; Nick Cummins; Sam Dickinson; Kylie Grimes; Daniel Kellett; Myles Pearson; Luke Wilson	Japan; Yuki Hasegawa; Tomoaki Imai; Kotaro Kishi; Kae Kurahashi; Seiya Norimatsu; Takayuki Norimatsu; Hitoshi Ogawa; Hidefumi Wakayama	Germany; Florian Bongard; Niklas Braschoss; Britta Kripke; Christian Riedel; Peter Schreiner; Thomas Schuwje; Robert Teichmann
