= Wheelchair rugby at the 2016 Summer Paralympics =

Wheelchair rugby at the XV Paralympic Games
- Venue: Carioca Arena 1
- Dates: 14–18 September 2016
- Competitors: 96 (8 teams)

Medalists
1st place, gold medalist(s)		Australia	Australia
2nd place, silver medalist(s)		United States	United States
3rd place, bronze medalist(s)		Japan	Japan

Wheelchair rugby at the 2016 Summer Paralympics was held in the Carioca Arena 1, also known as the Arena Carioca, from 14 September to 18 September 2016. There was a single event, for which both genders are eligible, where 8 teams compete.

== Qualification ==
Teams receive an allocation in the following order, and under the following processes:

- A National Paralympic Committee (NPC) may enter one team. The host country directly qualifies, as long as it has a rank on the IWRF Wheelchair Rugby World Ranking List, closing 1 May 2016.
- The top ranked NPC (not otherwise qualified) at the 2014 World Championships directly qualifies, subject to the eligibility requirement.
- The highest ranked NPC (not otherwise qualified) from the Wheelchair Rugby competition at the 2015 Parapan American Games directly qualifies.
- The two (2) highest ranked NPCs (not otherwise qualified) from the 2015 IWRF European Division A Championship directly qualify.
- The highest ranked NPC (not otherwise qualified) from the 2015 IWRF Asia-Oceania Championship directly qualifies.

If any of the Zonal Championships are not held, then the next highest ranked NPC from that Zone (not otherwise qualified) on the IWRF Wheelchair Rugby World Ranking List closing 1 May 2016 qualifies

- The two (2) highest ranked NPCs from the designated IWRF Paralympic Qualification Tournament qualify. If the Qualification Tournament is not held then the two (2) highest ranked NPCs (not otherwise qualified) on the IWRF Wheelchair Rugby World Ranking List closing 1 May 2016 qualify. In the event, the competition was held, with France and United States qualifying.

Qualified	Means of qualification	Date	Venue	Berths
Brazil	Host country	2 October 2009	(Denmark) Copenhagen	1
Australia	2014 IWRF Wheelchair Rugby World Championships	21–26 September 2014	(Denmark) Odense	1
Canada	2015 Parapan American Games	8-14 August 2015	(Canada) Toronto	1
Great Britain; Sweden	2015 IWRF European Division A Championship	13–20 September 2015	(Finland) Nastola	2
Japan	2015 IWRF Asia-Oceania Championship	29 October– 1 November 2015	(Japan) Chiba	1
France; United States	IWRF Wheelchair Rugby Olympic Qualifier	21 April 2016	(France) Paris	2

== Tournament ==
=== Group A ===
Pos	Team	Pld	W	D	L	GF	GA	GD	Pts	Qualification
1	United States	3	3	0	0	165	142	+23	6	Semi-finals
2	Japan	3	2	0	1	163	155	+8	4	Semi-finals
3	Sweden	3	1	0	2	145	151	−6	2	Fifth place Match
4	France	3	0	0	3	141	166	−25	0	Seventh place Match

Source: Rio2016
14 September 2016
12:45

United States	51–42	France
	Report

Carioca Arena 1, Rio de Janeiro
Referee: Jean Choiniere, Liam Costello
14 September 2016
16:00

Japan	50–46	Sweden
	Report

Carioca Arena 1, Rio de Janeiro
Referee: Mitch Carr, Darren Roberts
15 September 2016
10:30

Sweden	44–54	United States
	Report

Carioca Arena 1, Rio de Janeiro
Referee: Alexander Schriener, Lukasz Symczak
15 September 2016
16:00

Japan	57–52	France
	Report

Carioca Arena 1, Rio de Janeiro
Referee: Brian Ward, Pierre-Alexandre Briere
16 September 2016
10:30

France	47–55	Sweden
	Report

Carioca Arena 1, Rio de Janeiro
Referee: Mitch Carr, Jean Choiniere
16 September 2016
16:00

United States	57–56	Japan
	Report

Carioca Arena 1, Rio de Janeiro
Referee: Pierre-Alexandre Briere, Lukasz Symczak

=== Group B ===
Pos	Team	Pld	W	D	L	GF	GA	GD	Pts	Qualification
1	Australia	3	3	0	0	188	158	+30	6	Semi-finals
2	Canada	3	2	0	1	174	160	+14	4	Semi-finals
3	Great Britain	3	1	0	2	152	135	+17	2	Fifth place Match
4	Brazil (H)	3	0	0	3	125	186	−61	0	Seventh place Match

Source: Rio2016
(H) Hosts
14 September 2016
10:30

Australia	53–51	Great Britain
	Report

Carioca Arena 1, Rio de Janeiro
Referee: Pierre-Alexandre Briere, Alexander Shriener
14 September 2016
19:15

Canada	62–48	Brazil
	Report

Carioca Arena 1, Rio de Janeiro
Referee: Lukasz Szymczak, Brian Ward
15 September 2016
12:45

Great Britain	49–50	Canada
	Report

Carioca Arena 1, Rio de Janeiro
Referee: Liam Costello, Mitch Carr
15 September 2016
19:15

Australia	72–45	Brazil
	Report

Carioca Arena 1, Rio de Janeiro
Referee: Darren Roberts, Jean Choiniere
16 September 2016
12:45

Brazil	32–52	Great Britain
	Report

Carioca Arena 1, Rio de Janeiro
Referee: Alexander Schriener, Liam Costello
16 September 2016
19:15

Canada	62–63	Australia
	Report

Carioca Arena 1, Rio de Janeiro
Referee: Darren Roberts, Brian Ward

== Knockout stage ==
Semifinals
17 September
United States	60
Canada	55
17 September
Australia	63
Japan	57

Gold-medal match
18 September
Australia	59
United States	58
Bronze medal
18 September
Japan	52
Canada	50

=== Classification round ===
==== Seventh-place match ====
17 September 2016
10:30

Brazil	54–59	France
	Report

Carioca Arena 1, Rio de Janeiro
Referee: Perre-Alexandre Briere, Brian Ward

==== Fifth-place match ====
17 September 2016
19:15

Great Britain	56–42	Sweden
	Report

Carioca Arena 1, Rio de Janeiro
Referee: Lukasz Symczak

=== Medal round ===
==== Semifinals ====
17 September 2016
12:45

United States	60–55	Canada
	Report

Carioca Arena 1, Rio de Janeiro
Referee: Alexander Schriener, Liam Costello
17 September 2016
16:00

Australia	63–57	Japan
	Report

Carioca Arena 1, Rio de Janeiro
Referee: Jean Choiniere, Mitch Carr

==== Bronze-medal match ====
18 September 2016
09:00

(bronze) Japan	52–50	Canada
	Report

Carioca Arena 1, Rio de Janeiro
Referee: Darren Roberts, Liam Costello

==== Gold-medal match ====
18 September 2016
12:30

(gold) Australia	59–58	(silver) United States
	Report

Carioca Arena 1, Rio de Janeiro
Referee: Pierre-Alexandre Briere, Alexander Schreiner

== See also ==
- Rugby sevens at the 2016 Summer Olympics
