= Japan national wheelchair rugby team =

Japan JPN
- IWRF Ranking: 3
- Joined IWRF: 1997; 29 years ago
- IWRF Zone: IWRF Asia-Oceania
- National Federation: Japan Wheelchair Rugby Federation

Paralympic Games
- Appearances: 6
- Medals: Gold: 2024; Bronze: 2016, 2020

World Championships
- Appearances: 4
- Medals: (gold) Gold: 2018; (bronze) Bronze: 2010, 2022, 2026

IWRF Asia-Oceania Championship
- Appearances: 9
- Medals: (gold) Gold: 2015, 2023, 2025; (silver) Silver: 2011, 2013, 2017, 2019; (bronze) Bronze: 2001, 2003, 2005, 2009

The Japan national wheelchair rugby team (日本全国車椅子ラグビーチーム) represents Japan in international wheelchair rugby. Japan is the third most successful team in the Asia-Oceania region, finishing outside the medal places only once in eight appearances at the IWRF Asia-Oceania Championship. Japan have won the tournament once, in 2015 and are also the 2014 Asian Para Games champions. They have reached six Summer Paralympics, winning the gold medal at the 2024 Games in Paris.

== History ==
The Japan Wheelchair Rugby Federation (formerly the Japan Quad Rugby Federation) was established in April 1997, in response to the introduction of wheelchair rugby at the 1996 Summer Paralympics in Atlanta. A wheelchair rugby club structure was already in existence and a national team was quickly formed, with a tour to Australia undertaken by the end of the year. In 2001 Japan sent their national team to the inaugural IWRF Asia-Oceania Championship and have been a constant fixture at the event ever since. In the first five Asia-Oceania Games, Japan was normally the third placed team, behind the dominance of Australia and New Zealand.

In 2004 Japan qualified for their first Summer Paralympics. Although initially unsuccessful, with only two wins over China in the first 11 games of their first two Paralympics, the team showed improvement in the buildup to the 2012 Games in London. The team's first breakthrough came at the 2011 IWRF Asia-Oceania Championship, where they finished second for the first time, beating New Zealand into third place. They followed this by finishing second in their group at the 2012 Paralympics by beating both Britain and France. Japan finished fourth at the Games just outside the medal positions. Wheelchair rugby was introduced at the 2014 Asian Para Games, which Japan won, beating South Korea in the final. The next year Japan won their first IWRF Asia-Oceania Championship, beating Australia 56–51 in the gold medal play off, finishing the year ranked as the 3rd best team in the world.

== Paralympic Games ==
Japan have appeared in three Summer Paralympics, 2004 in Athens, 2008 in Beijing and 2012 in London. They have qualified for the 2016 Summer Paralympics in Rio when they won the 2015 IWRF Asia-Oceania Championship.

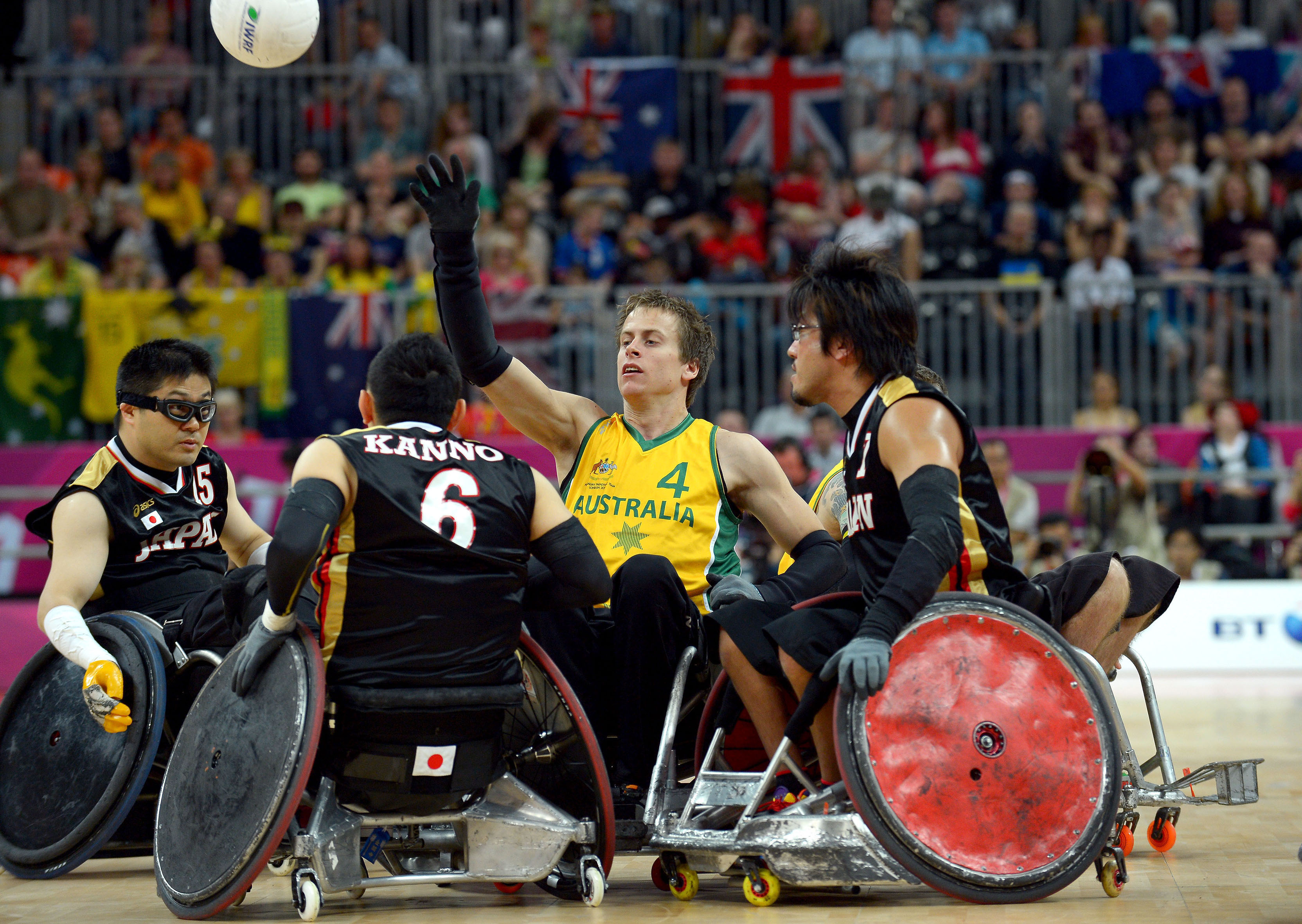
Japan's national team in action at London 2012

The 2004 Paralympics in Beijing was the second Games to host a wheelchair rugby event, after its introduction in the previous Games in Sydney. Japan became the first Asian nation to qualify for the Wheelchair rugby tournament. Japan were placed in Group A, along with Australia, New Zealand and the United States. They lost all three-round matches, though their match against Australia was close affair, finishing 48–47 to the Australians. In the medal round they were paired against Great Britain and a loss saw an end to their medal chances. They finished the 2004 tournament in last place. They returned four years later, qualifying due to their world ranking. They again found themselves in Group A, facing Canada, the United States and hosts China. They recorded their first Paralympic win with victory over China, but due to loses to both Canada and the States, they finished in the bottom half of the overall table, finishing seventh overall.

In the 2012 Games in London Japan qualified through the group stage for the first time in their history, beating both France and hosts Great Britain in the qualifying round. In the medal round they lost against eventual champions Australia in the semi-finals, and in the bronze medal play-off match they were beaten by the United States to finish in fourth place.

=== Paralympic results ===
Paralympic Games results
Year	Position	Pld	W	L
(Greece) 2004	8th	6	0	6
(China) 2008	7th	5	2	3
(United Kingdom) 2012	4th	5	2	3
(Brazil) 2016	3rd	5	3	2
(Japan) 2020	3rd	5	4	1
(France) 2024	1st	5	5	0
Total		31	16	15

== World Wheelchair Rugby Championships ==
Japan first entered the World Wheelchair Rugby Championships in 2002 where they finished eighth from a field of 12. The team returned for the next games in 2006 in Christchurch, New Zealand, where they finished fifth. The 2010 Championships, in Vancouver, was the team's best to date. They qualified through their group and succeeded into the medal stages. Although losing their semi-final encounter, they were able to beat Sweden in the bronze medal match to finish third overall. At the 2014 IWRF World Championship Japan finished second in their group during the qualifying stages but were beaten by Australia in the semi-final. The team were then faced the United States for the bronze medal encounter, but lost 62–56 to finish in fourth place.
