= Wheelchair rugby at the 2020 Summer Paralympics =

Wheelchair rugby at the XVI Paralympic Games
- Wheelchair rugby pictogram of the 2020 Summer Paralympics
- Venue: Yoyogi National Stadium
- Dates: 25–29 August 2021
- Competitors: 96 from 8 nations

Medalists
1st place, gold medalist(s)		Great Britain (GBR)
2nd place, silver medalist(s)		United States (USA)
3rd place, bronze medalist(s)		Japan (JPN)

The Wheelchair rugby tournament at the 2020 Summer Paralympics in Tokyo, Japan was the seventh edition of Wheelchair rugby as a Paralympic sport since its debut as a demonstration sport at the 1996 Summer Paralympics in Atlanta. The competition was hosted at the Yoyogi National Stadium and was held from 25 to 29 August 2021.

Eight teams competed in the competition which included the debutant of Denmark at the Paralympics. The eight teams were separated into two groups of four with the top two teams from each group qualifying through to the semi-finals while the bottom two played off in the fifth and seventh place match respectively. The remaining four teams then played-off in two semi-finals with the winners going through to the gold medal play-off while the losers met in the bronze-medal match.

Great Britain won the gold medal, the first European team ever to do so, with a 54–49 victory over the United States. It was also Great Britain's first medal in the sport at the seventh attempt. Hosts Japan won bronze with victory over Australia.

== Qualification ==
Means of qualification	Date	Venue	Berths	Qualified
Host Country Allocation	—N/a	—N/a	1	Japan (JPN)
2018 World Championships	5–10 August 2018	(Australia) Sydney	1	Australia (AUS)
2019 IWRF European Championship Division A	7–11 August 2019	(Denmark) Vejle	2	Denmark (DEN); Great Britain (GBR)
2019 Parapan American Games	23 August – 1 September 2019	(Peru) Lima	1	United States (USA)
2019 IWRF Asia-Oceania Championship	6–9 September 2019	(South Korea) Gangneung	1	New Zealand (NZL)
2020 IWRF Paralympic Qualification Tournament	2–9 March 2020	(Canada) Richmond	2	Canada (CAN); France (FRA)
Total			8	

== Schedule ==
G	Group stage	C	Classification rounds	½	Semi-finals	B	Bronze-medal match	F	Final

Date Event	Wed 25 Aug	Thurs 26 Aug	Fri 27 Aug	Sat 28 Aug		Sun 29 Aug	
Mixed team	G	G	G	C (5th/6th) (7th/8th)	½	B	F

== Medalists ==
Event	Gold	Silver	Bronze
Mixed	Great Britain; Ayaz Bhuta; Jonathan Coggan; Ryan Cowling; Nicholas Cummins; Kylie Grimes; Aaron Phipps; Jim Roberts; Stuart Robinson; Chris Ryan; Jack Smith; Jamie Stead; Gavin Walker	United States; Chuck Aoki; Jeff Butler; Chad Cohn; Joseph Delagrave; Lee Fredette; Ray Hennagir; Joe Jackson; Chuck Melton; Eric Newby; Kory Puderbaugh; Adam Scaturro; Josh Wheeler	Japan; Masayuki Haga; Yuki Hasegawa; Katsuya Hashimoto; Yukinobu Ike; Daisuke Ikezaki; Tomoaki Imai; Kae Kurahashi; Shunya Nakamachi; Seiya Norimatsu; Hitoshi Ogawa; Shinichi Shimakawa; Hidefumi Wakayama

== Tournament ==
=== Group A ===
Pos	Team	Pld	W	D	L	GF	GA	GD	Pts	Qualification
1	Japan (H)	3	3	0	0	170	155	+15	6	Semi-finals
2	Australia	3	1	0	2	156	159	−3	2	Semi-finals
3	France	3	1	0	2	151	153	−2	2	Fifth place Match
4	Denmark	3	1	0	2	155	165	−10	2	Seventh place Match

Source: Tokyo2020
(H) Hosts
25 August 2020
12:45

Australia	53–54	Denmark

Yoyogi National Stadium, Tokyo
25 August 2021
20:00

Japan	53–51	France

Yoyogi National Stadium, Tokyo

26 August 2021
12:45

Japan	60–51	Denmark

Yoyogi National Stadium, Tokyo
26 August 2021
12:45

Australia	50–48	France

Yoyogi National Stadium, Tokyo

27 August 2021
12:45

France	52–50	Denmark

Yoyogi National Stadium, Tokyo
27 August 2021
12:45

Australia	53–57	Japan

Yoyogi National Stadium, Tokyo

=== Group B ===
Pos	Team	Pld	W	D	L	GF	GA	GD	Pts	Qualification
1	United States	3	3	0	0	171	137	+34	6	Semi-finals
2	Great Britain	3	2	0	1	158	134	+24	4	Semi-finals
3	Canada	3	1	0	2	152	144	+8	2	Fifth place Match
4	New Zealand	3	0	0	3	108	174	−66	0	Seventh place Match

Source: Tokyo2020
25 August 2021
12:45

United States	63–35	New Zealand

Yoyogi National Stadium, Tokyo
25 August 2021
12:45

Canada	47–50	Great Britain

Yoyogi National Stadium, Tokyo

26 August 2021
12:45

United States	58–54	Canada

Yoyogi National Stadium, Tokyo
26 August 2021
12:45

New Zealand	37–60	Great Britain

Yoyogi National Stadium, Tokyo

27 August 2021
12:45

United States	50–48	Great Britain

Yoyogi National Stadium, Tokyo
27 August 2021
12:45

New Zealand	36–51	Canada

Yoyogi National Stadium, Tokyo

== Knockout stage ==
Medal round bracket

Semifinals
28 August
Japan	49
Great Britain	55
28 August
United States	49
Australia	42

Gold-medal match
29 August
Great Britain	54
United States	49
Bronze medal
29 August
Japan	60
Australia	52

=== Classification round ===
==== Seventh place Match ====
28 August 2021
11:30

Denmark	56–53	New Zealand

Yoyogi National Stadium, Tokyo

==== Fifth place Match ====
28 August 2021
20:00

France	49–57	Canada

Yoyogi National Stadium, Tokyo

==== Semi finals ====
28 August 2021
20:00

United States	49–42	Australia

Yoyogi National Stadium, Tokyo
28 August 2021
20:00

Japan	49–55	Great Britain

Yoyogi National Stadium, Tokyo

==== Bronze-medal match ====
29 August 2021
20:00

Japan	60–52	Australia

Yoyogi National Stadium, Tokyo

==== Gold-medal match ====
29 August 2021
20:00

United States	49–54	Great Britain

Yoyogi National Stadium, Tokyo
