= Wheelchair rugby =

Team sport

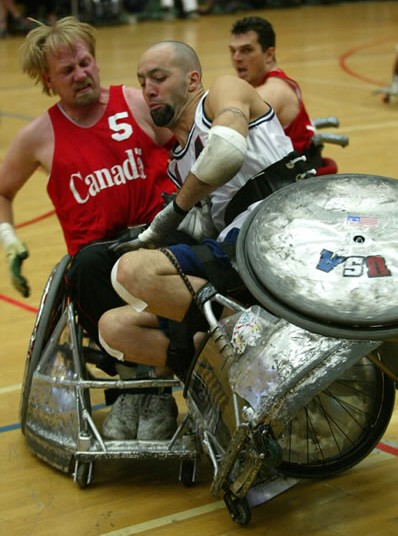
- Canada's Garett Hickling vs. USA's Bryan Kirkland at a wheelchair rugby game

Characteristics
- Type: Wheelchair sport, rugby sport

Presence
- Paralympic: Yes, demonstrated in 1996, medal event since 2000
- World Games: Yes, demonstrated in 2022

Wheelchair rugby is a team sport for athletes with a disability that is practiced in over twenty-five countries and is a summer Paralympic Games sport. Five Canadians, who were looking for sports accessible to people with tetraplegia, created wheelchair rugby in 1976. The game is played indoors on a hardwood court; it includes physical contact between wheelchairs. The rules include elements from wheelchair basketball, ice hockey, handball and rugby union. In wheelchair rugby, players cannot kick the ball; they must move it towards the goal by carrying it while in a wheelchair. Wheelchair rugby uses a spherical ball, unlike that used in traditional rugby.

There are several codes of wheelchair rugby, the oldest being a four-against-four version originally named murderball or quad. Players must have some loss of function in at least three limbs to qualify for this version. Other versions of the game were created for different disability levels; there exists a three-against-three version for players with major impairments and a more inclusive, five-discipline version.

The sport is governed by the World Wheelchair Rugby (WWR), which was established in 1993.

== History ==
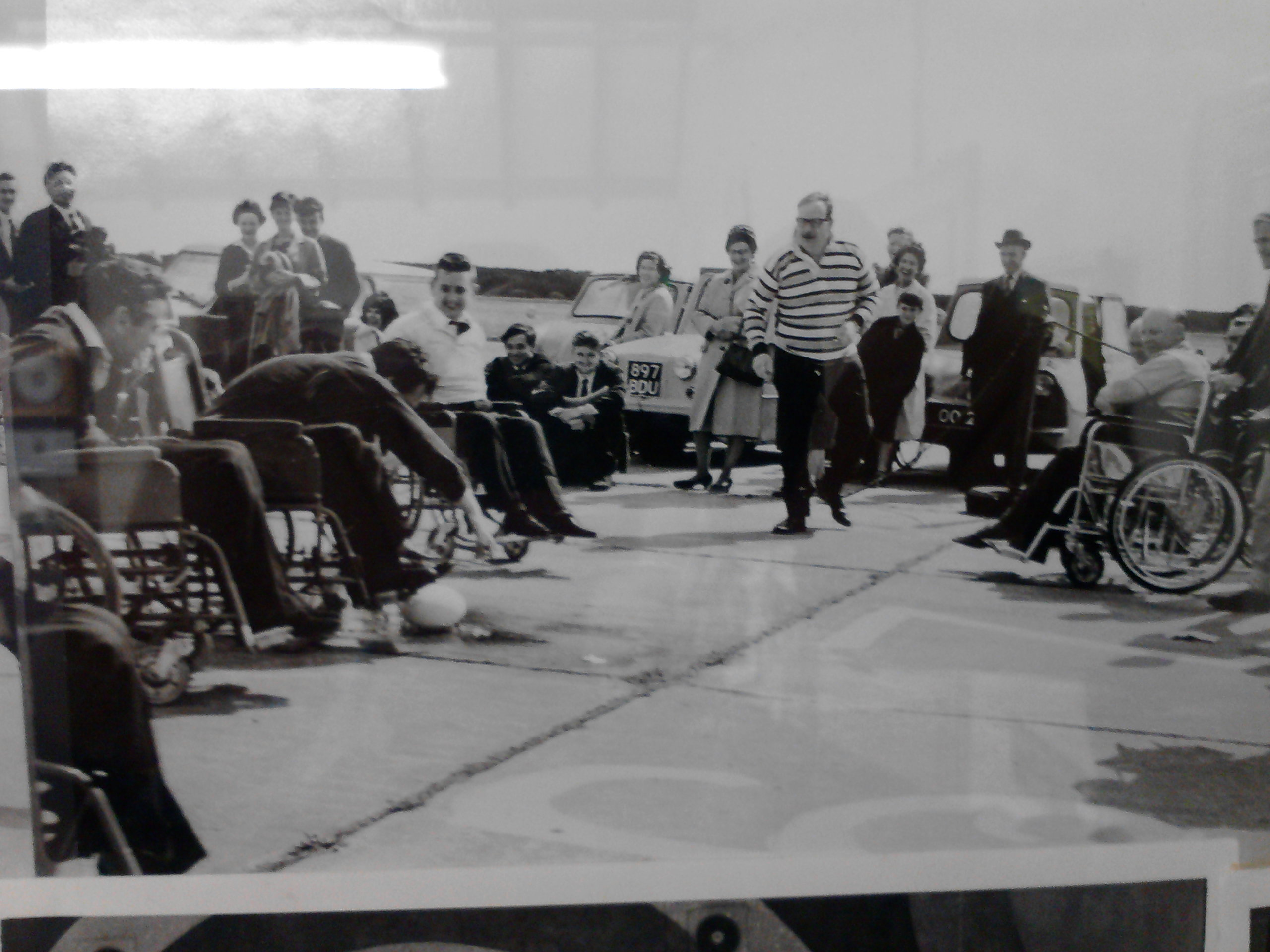
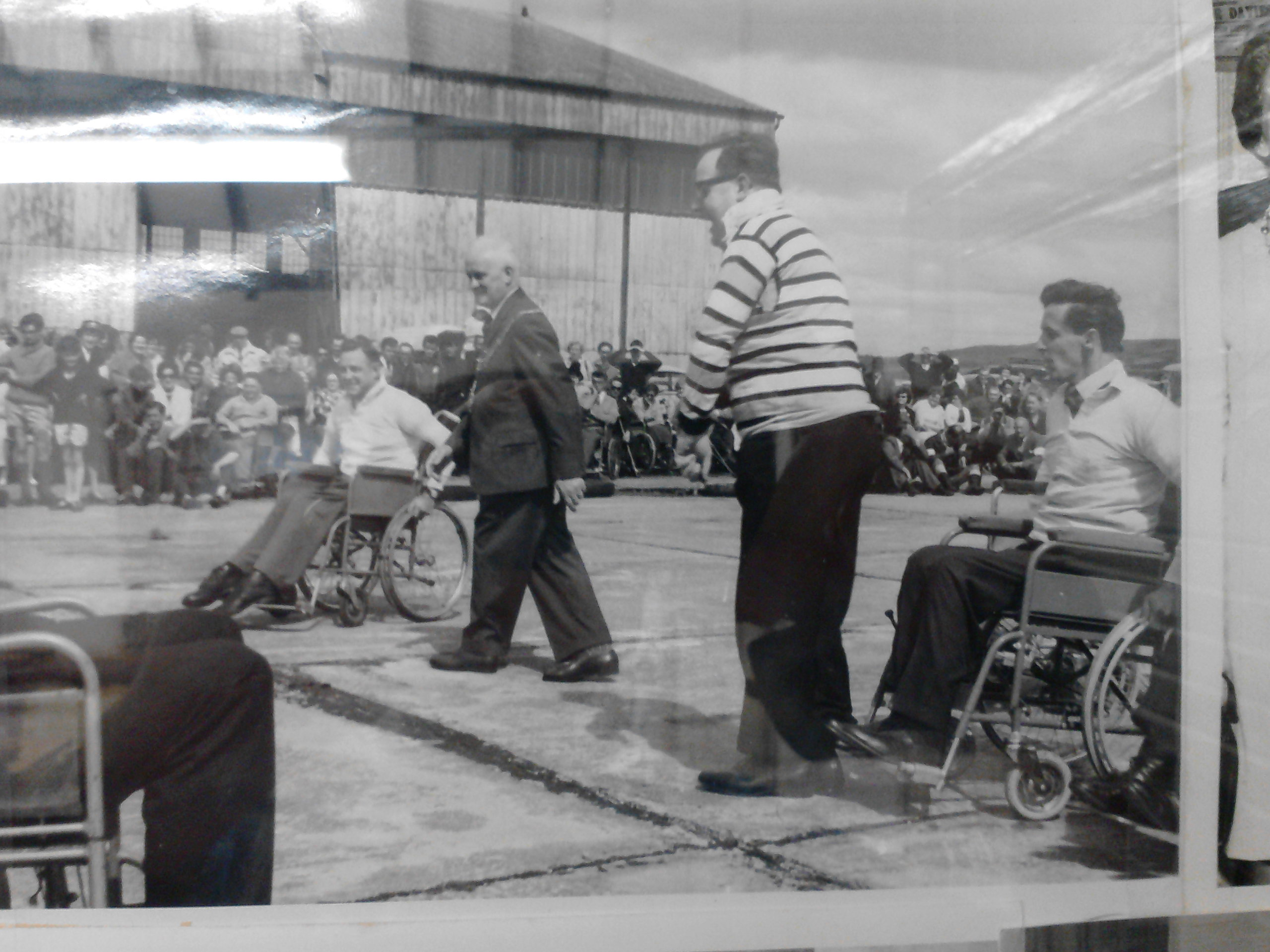
Photos of an early Wheelchair Rugby game at Pembrey Airfield near Llanelli, Wales in the 1960's

Wheelchair rugby was created in 1976 by Canadian wheelchair athletes Gerry Terwin, Duncan Campbell, Randy Dueck, Paul LeJeune and Chris Sargent, in Winnipeg, Manitoba, for persons with tetraplegia. At that time, wheelchair basketball was the most common team sport for wheelchair users but the physical requirement for players to dribble and throw the ball into a hoop relegated quadriplegic athletes, with functional impairments to both their upper and lower limbs, to supporting roles. This new sport—originally called "murderball" due to its aggressive, full-contact nature—was designed to allow quadriplegic athletes with a wide range of functional ability levels to play integral offensive and defensive roles.

Three years later, the game was first played outside Canada, in the United States. The first international tournament was held in 1982 with teams from North America. By the end of the 1980s, international tournaments included teams from the United Kingdom. It had also reached Australia.

In 1990, wheelchair rugby first appeared at the International Stoke Mandeville Games (now the World Abilitysport Games) as an exhibition event, and in 1993, the sport was recognized as an official international sport for athletes with a disability. In the same year, the International Wheelchair Rugby Federation (IWRF) was established as a sports section of ISMWSF to govern the sport. The first IWRF World Wheelchair Rugby Championships were held in Nottwil, Switzerland, in 1995.

Wheelchair rugby appeared as a demonstration sport at the 1996 Summer Paralympics in Atlanta, United States. The sport has had full-medal status since the 2000 Summer Paralympics in Sydney, Australia, and over thirty active countries are now active in international competition, with several others developing the sport.

== Rules ==
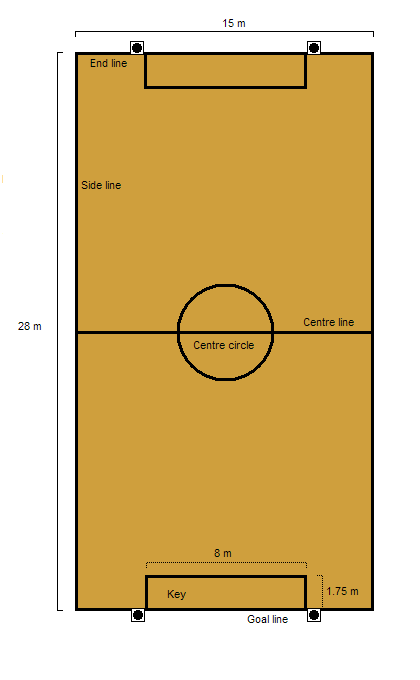
Wheelchair rugby court

Wheelchair rugby is played by two teams of players in specially designed wheelchairs. It is a mixed-gender sport and teams include athletes of both sexes. The number of players on each team varies, four against four being the original format. Wheelchair rugby is played indoors on a hardwood court with the same dimensions as a regulation basketball court—28 by 15 meters (91.9 by 49.2 ft). The required court markings are a center line and a circle, and a key area measuring 8 by 1.75 meters (26.2 by 5.7 ft) at each end of the court. No more than three players are allowed in their team's key at any one time while they are defending their goal, and offensive players are not permitted to remain in the opposing team's key for more than eight seconds.

The goal line is the section of the end line within the key. Each end of the goal line is marked with a cone-shaped pylon. Players score by carrying the ball across the goal line. For a goal to count, two wheels of the player's wheelchair must cross the line while the player has possession of the ball. Goals are sometimes called "tries" in a manner akin to traditional rugby. When in possession of the ball, players must bounce or pass it within eight seconds. They must also pass the halfway line within twelve seconds of their team receiving the ball. The team must score within forty seconds of receiving the ball or they will concede possession.

Fouls are penalized by either a thirty-second penalty for defensive fouls and technical fouls, or a loss of possession for offensive fouls. In some cases, a penalty goal may be awarded instead of a penalty. While contact between wheelchairs is permitted, there is no contact between players. Common fouls include "spinning" (striking an opponent's wheelchair behind the main axle, causing it to spin horizontally or vertically), "illegal use of hands" or "reaching in" (striking an opponent with the arms or hands), and "holding" (holding or obstructing an opponent by grasping with the hands or arms, or falling onto them).

While different times can be played, games generally consist of four eight-minute quarters. If the ball goes out of play, the time is suspended until it is back in play. If the game is tied at the end of regulation play, three-minute overtime periods are played.

== Equipment ==
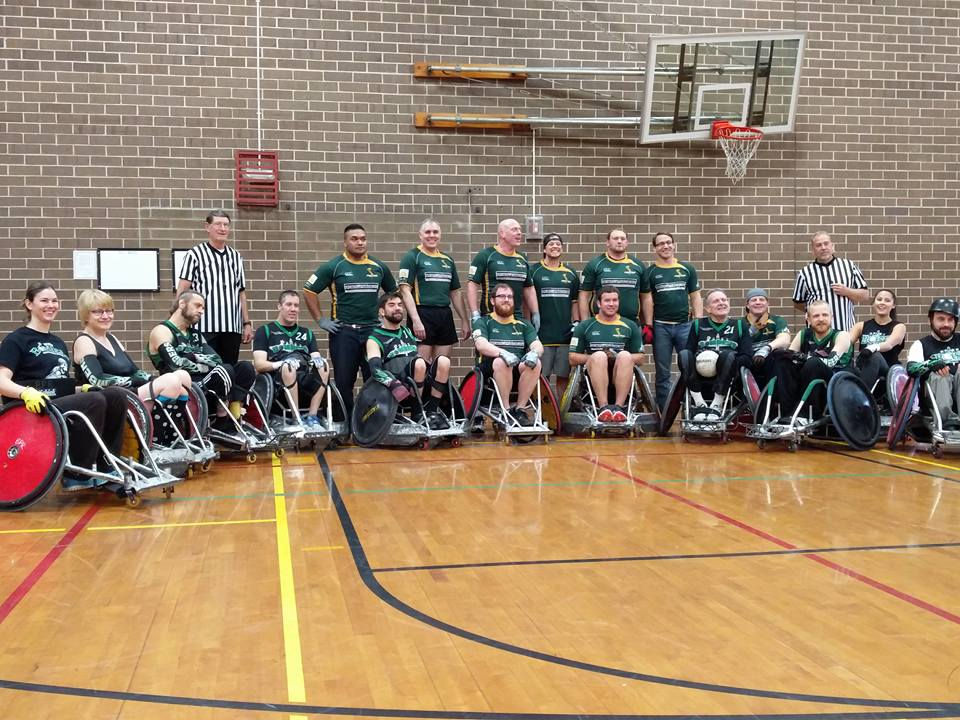
The Boise Bombers Wheelchair Rugby Team poses following its third annual Toys For Tots match, displaying a variety of gear.

Wheelchair rugby is played in a manual wheelchair, for which the sport's rules include detailed specifications. Players use custom-made sports wheelchairs. Key design features include a front bumper, designed to help strike and hold opposing wheelchairs, and wings that are positioned in front of the main wheels to make the wheelchair more difficult to stop and hold. All wheelchairs must be equipped with spoke protectors to prevent damage to the wheels, and an anti-tip device at the back. New players and players in developing countries sometimes play in wheelchairs to which temporary bumpers and wings are added to adapt them for wheelchair rugby.

Wheelchair rugby uses a regulation volleyball, typically of a "soft-touch" design, with a slightly textured surface to provide a grip. The balls are normally over-inflated compared to volleyball to make them bouncier. The official ball of the sport is the Molten soft-touch volleyball. Players use other personal equipment, such as gloves and applied adhesives, to assist with ball handling due to their often-impaired gripping ability, and strapping to maintain a good seating position.

== Classification ==
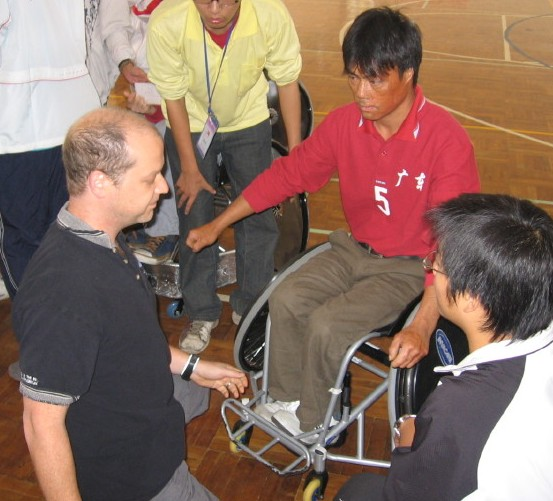
Wheelchair rugby classifier examining a new player

To be eligible to play wheelchair rugby, athletes must have some form of disability with a loss of function in both the upper and lower limbs. The majority of wheelchair rugby athletes have spinal-cord injuries at the level of their cervical vertebrae. Other eligible players have disabilities from causes that include multiple amputations, polio, or neurological disorders such as cerebral palsy, muscular dystrophy and Guillain–Barré syndrome.

Players are classified according to their functional level and assigned a point value ranging from 0.5—the lowest functional level—to 3.5, the highest. The total classification value of all players of a team on the court at any one time may not exceed eight points.

To become classified, players are assessed for their level of disability to determine if they meet the eligibility requirements for wheelchair rugby. These require that an athlete have a neurological disability that involves at least three limbs, or a non-neurological disability that involves all four limbs. The athlete then completes a series of muscle tests to evaluate the strength and range of motion in the upper limbs and trunk. A classification can then be assigned to the athlete. Classification frequently includes subsequent observation of the athlete in competition to confirm that physical function in game situations reflects what was observed during muscle testing.

Athletes are permitted to appeal their classification if they feel they have not been properly evaluated. They can be granted a permanent classification if they demonstrate a stable level of function over a series of classification tests. Wheelchair rugby classification is conducted by personnel with medical training, usually physicians, physiotherapists, or occupational therapists. Classifiers must also be trained in muscle testing and in the details of wheelchair-rugby classification.

== Active countries ==
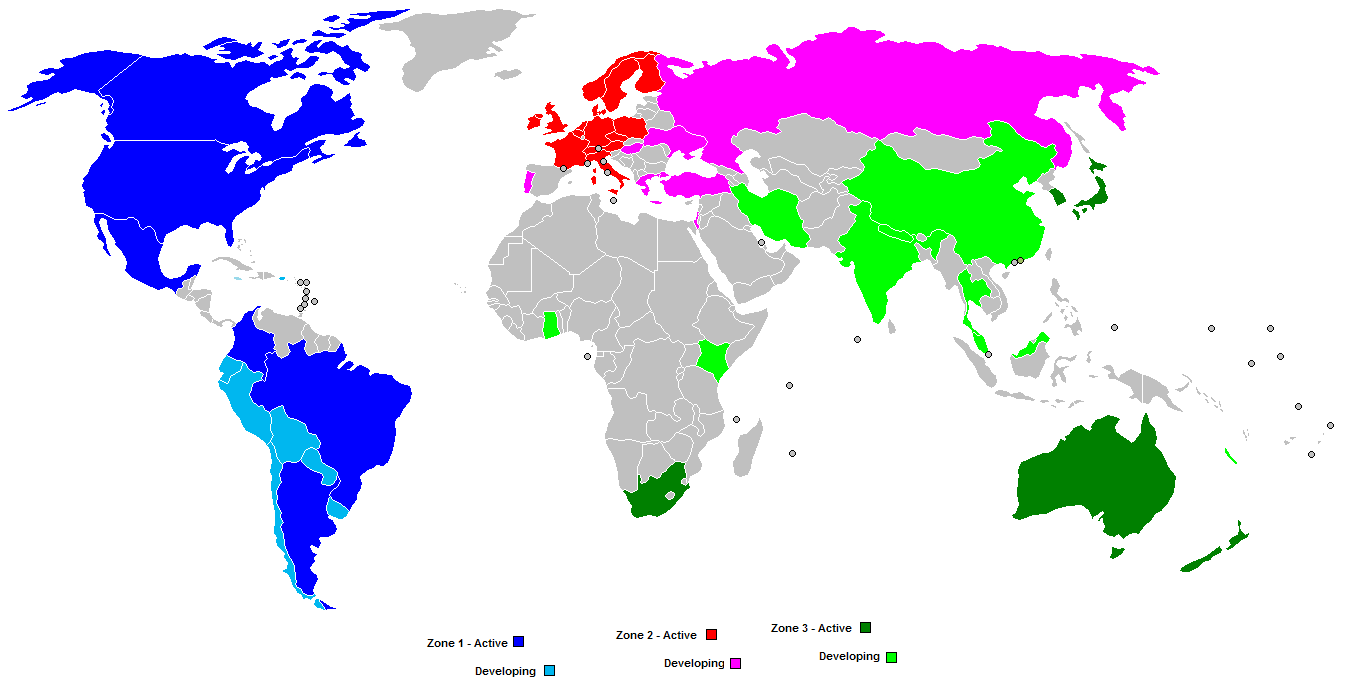
Countries playing wheelchair rugby

As of 2026, there are thirty-one active countries playing wheelchair rugby and twenty-six more developing national teams, divided into three zones:

International Competing Countries
Zone number	Area	Country
1	The Americas	Argentina
1	The Americas	Brazil
1	The Americas	Canada
1	The Americas	Chile
1	The Americas	Colombia
1	The Americas	Paraguay
1	The Americas	United States
2	Europe	Austria
2	Europe	Czech Republic
2	Europe	Denmark
2	Europe	Finland
2	Europe	France
2	Europe	Germany
2	Europe	Great Britain
2	Europe	Ireland
2	Europe	Israel
2	Europe	Italy
2	Europe	Netherlands
2	Europe	Poland
2	Europe	Russia
2	Europe	Spain
2	Europe	Sweden
2	Europe	Switzerland
3	Asia / Oceania	Australia
3	Asia / Oceania	India
3	Asia / Oceania	Japan
3	Asia / Oceania	Korea
3	Asia / Oceania	Malaysia
3	Asia / Oceania	New Zealand
3	Asia / Oceania	South Africa
3	Asia / Oceania	Thailand

== International competitions ==
World Wheelchair Rugby Championships 2002, Gothenburg, Sweden

The major international wheelchair rugby competitions are the biennial Zone Championships, which are held in odd-numbered years, and the quadrennial World Championships, which are held in even-numbered years. Wheelchair rugby is also included in regional events such as the Parapan American Games and World Games.

Since 2000, wheelchair rugby has been included in the Summer Paralympic Games.

Wheelchair rugby has been featured twice at the Asian Para Games: in 2014 and 2026.

== Variations ==
The Paralympic version of wheelchair rugby has been adapted with varied rules and a broader classification system that allows players with more physical functioning to compete.

=== Invictus Games ===
Team size reduces from 12 in the preliminary rounds to 10 in the semi-finals and final. Classifications are in three categories:

- "Maximum" players (1 point): roughly in line with classification for the Paralympic version of the game
- "Moderate" players (2 points): players with functional or physical impairments (e.g., all-leg amputees (single and double) or significant balance issues (e.g., player must walk with assistive devices) )
- "Open" players (3 points): players with minor or non-permanent physical disabilities and other illnesses (e.g., PTSD, TBI, minor orthopedic injuries)

A maximum of 10 points from 4 players can be played on the court at any time.

=== Wheelchair Rugby 5s ===
The 5s version of wheelchair rugby was developed in the UK by Great Britain Wheelchair Rugby in 2017. The game was officially adopted by World Wheelchair Rugby in June 2021. Like the Invictus variation, the 5s game widens eligibility. Team size remains at 12. Classifications in broad groups:

- 0.5: Paralympic wheelchair rugby classifications from 0.5 to 1.5
- 1.0: Paralympic wheelchair rugby classifications from 2.0 to 3.5
- 1.5: GBWR Paralympic classification of 4.0 and players with an impairment in one upper limb
- 2.0: Players with an impairment in both lower limbs
- 3.0: Players with an impairment in one lower limb
- 4.0: Players with a diagnosed pain-related impairment (GBWR only)

A maximum of 10 points from 5 players can be played on the court at any time.

== In popular culture ==
Wheelchair rugby is featured in the Oscar-nominated 2005 documentary Murderball. It was voted the number-one Top Sports Movie of all time by the movie review website Rotten Tomatoes. The character Jason Street in the NBC television show Friday Night Lights, having been paralysed in a game of American football in the pilot, tries out for the United States quad rugby team in a later episode.

== See also ==
- Parasports
- Wheelchair rugby league
- Wheelchair Australian rules football

== General citations ==
- "International Rules for the Sport of Wheelchair Rugby". iwrf.com. International Wheelchair Rugby Federation. 2006. Archived from the original on August 25, 2006.
- "International Wheelchair Rugby Classification Manual". iwrf.com (2nd ed.). International Wheelchair Rugby Federation. 1999. Archived from the original on January 14, 2011.
- "About Wheelchair Rugby". iwrf.com. International Wheelchair Rugby Federation. 2006. Archived from the original on April 24, 2008.
- "Wheelchair rugby: About the sport". paralympic.org. International Paralympic Committee. 2006. Archived from the original on March 7, 2006.
- "Pasadena Texans Wheelchair Rugby". texansrugby.org. 2007. Archived from the original on December 23, 2017.
