= Ben Fawcett =

Australian wheelchair rugby player

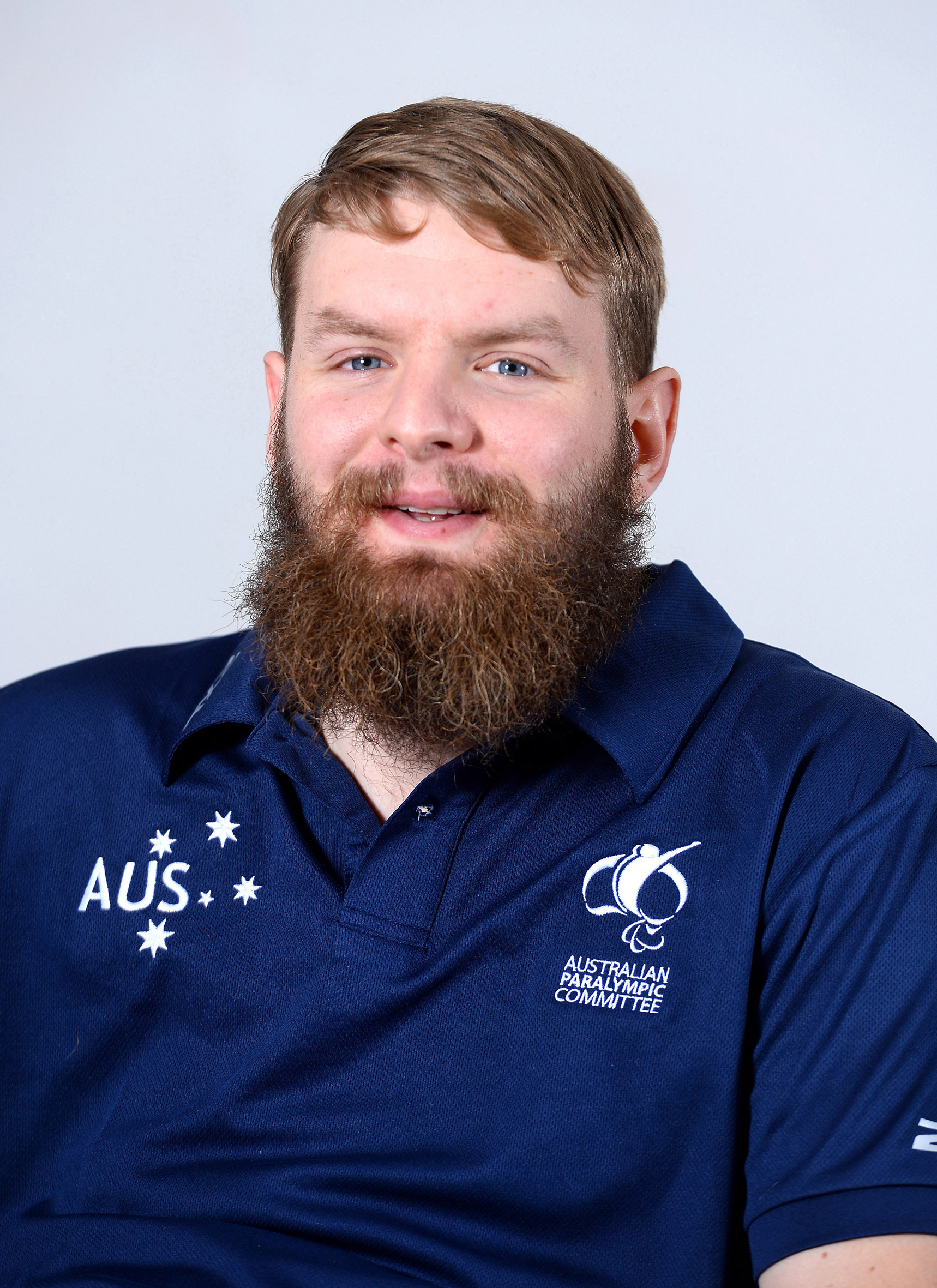
- 2016 Australian Paralympic team portrait

Personal information
- Full name: Benjamin John Fawcett
- Nationality: Australia
- Born: 31 December 1990 (age 35)

Sport
- Disability class: 0.5
- Club: Melbourne Rugby Club
Medal record
Wheelchair rugby
Representing Australia
Paralympic Games
Gold medal – first place	2016 Rio	Mixed
Bronze medal – third place	2024 Paris	Mixed
World Championships
Silver medal – second place	2018 Sydney	Mixed
Gold medal – first place	2022 Vejle	Mixed

Benjamin John Fawcett OAM (born 31 December 1990) is an Australian wheelchair rugby player and member of the national wheelchair rugby team. He won a gold medal at the 2016 Rio Paralympics and a bronze medal at the 2024 Paris Paralympics.

== Personal ==
Fawcett was born on 31 December 1990. At the age of 18, a snowboard accident in New Zealand led to him becoming a quadriplegic. He lives in Bacchus Marsh, Victoria.

== Wheelchair rugby ==
Whilst undertaking rehabilitation in Australia, he was introduced to wheelchair rugby. He was named Australian Rookie of the Year in 2012 and made his international debut for Australian Steelers in 2013 at the tri-series between Australia, New Zealand, and the United States.

He was a member of the team that retained its gold medal at the 2016 Rio Paralympics after defeating the United States 59–58 in the final. He was awarded the Order of Australia Medal in 2017.

At the 2018 IWRF World Championship in Sydney, Australia, he was a member of the Australian team that won the silver medal after being defeated by Japan 61–62 in the gold medal game.

At the 2020 Summer Paralympics, the Steelers finished fourth after being defeated by Japan 52–60 in the bronze medal game. COVID travel restrictions led to Steelers not having a team training since March 2020 prior to Tokyo.

Fawcett won his first world championship gold medal at the 2022 IWRF World Championship in Vejle, Denmark, when Australia defeated the United States.

At the 2024 Summer Paralympics, he was a member of the Steelers that won the bronze medal defeating Great Britain 50–48.
