= Jake Howe =

Australian wheelchair rugby player (born 1991)

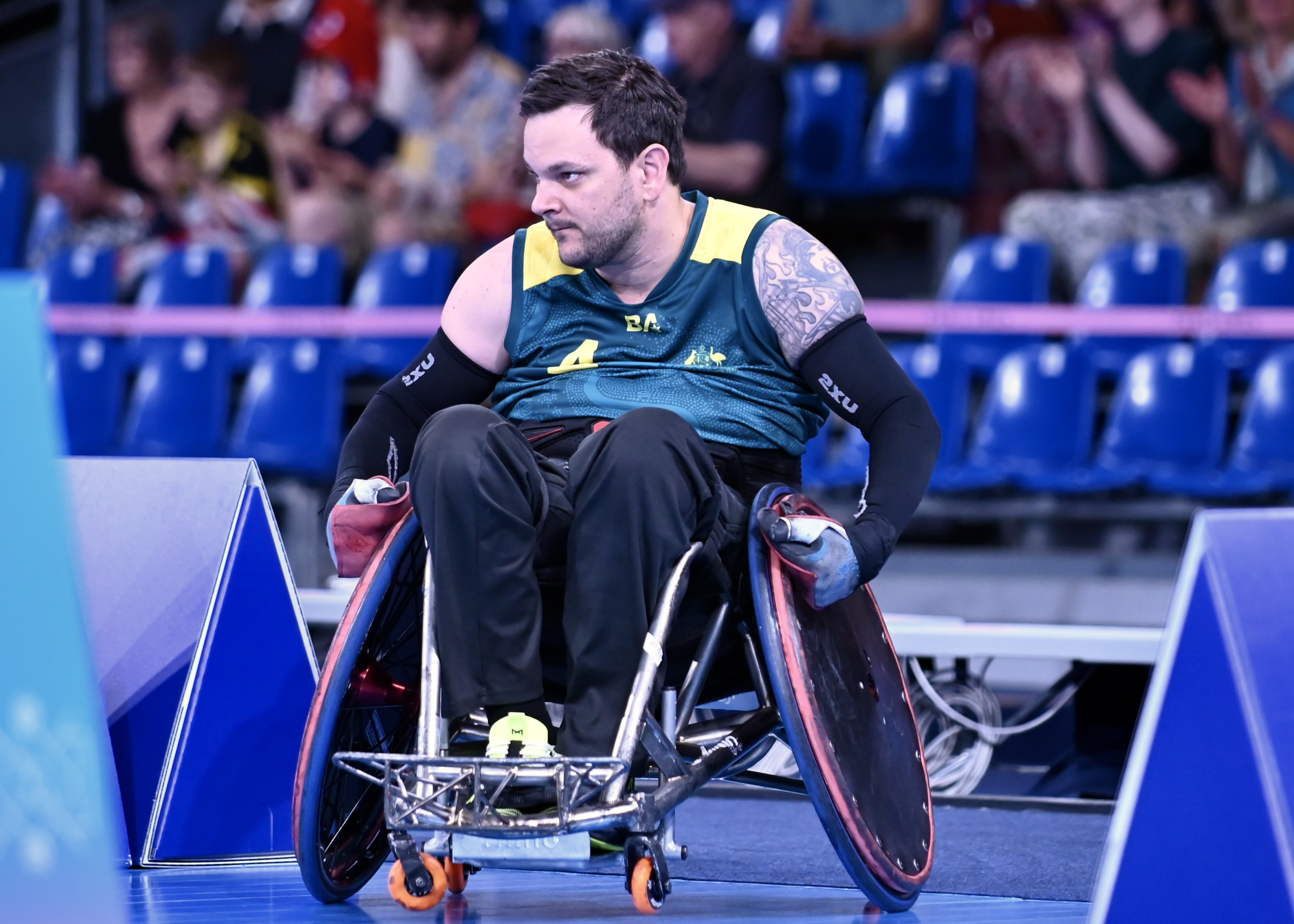

Personal information
- Born: 4 June 1991 (age 35)

Sport
- Sport: Wheelchair rugby
- Disability class: 1.0
- Club: Melbourne Rugby Club
- Team: Australian Steelers (2017–current)
Medal record
Wheelchair rugby
Representing Australia
Paralympic Games
Bronze medal – third place	2024 Paris	Mixed
World Championships
Silver medal – second place	2018 Sydney	Mixed
Gold medal – first place	2022 Vejle	Mixed

Jake Howe (born 4 June 1991) is an Australian wheelchair rugby player. He has represented the Steelers at the 2020 Tokyo Paralympics and the 2024 Paris Paralympics, where they won the bronze medal.

== Personal ==
Howe was born on 4 June 1991. On 10 March 2012, Howe was wrestling with his best friend on the Barrack Street Jetty during a 21st birthday party river cruise. He landed on his head and this broke a bone in neck and crushed his spinal cord, paralysing him from the armpits down. At the time his girlfriend was pregnant and he now has a son Lucas. He lives in Perth, Western Australia.

== Wheelchair rigby ==
Howe is classified 1.0 player. Howe made his international debut for Australian wheelchair rugby team at the 2017 Ken Sowden Cup in Christchurch, New Zealand. At the 2018 IWRF World Championship in Sydney, Australia, he was a member of the Australian team that won the silver medal after being defeated by Japan 61–62 in the gold medal game.

At the 2020 Summer Paralympics, the Steelers finished fourth after being defeated by Japan 52–60 in the bronze medal game. COVID travel restrictions led to Steelers not having a team training since March 2020 prior to Tokyo.

Howe won his first world championship gold medal at the 2022 IWRF World Championship in Vejle, Denmark, when Australia defeated the United States.

At the 2024 Summer Paralympics, he was a member of the Steelers that won the bronze medal defeating Great Britain 50–48.
