= Michael Ozanne =

Australian wheelchair rugby player

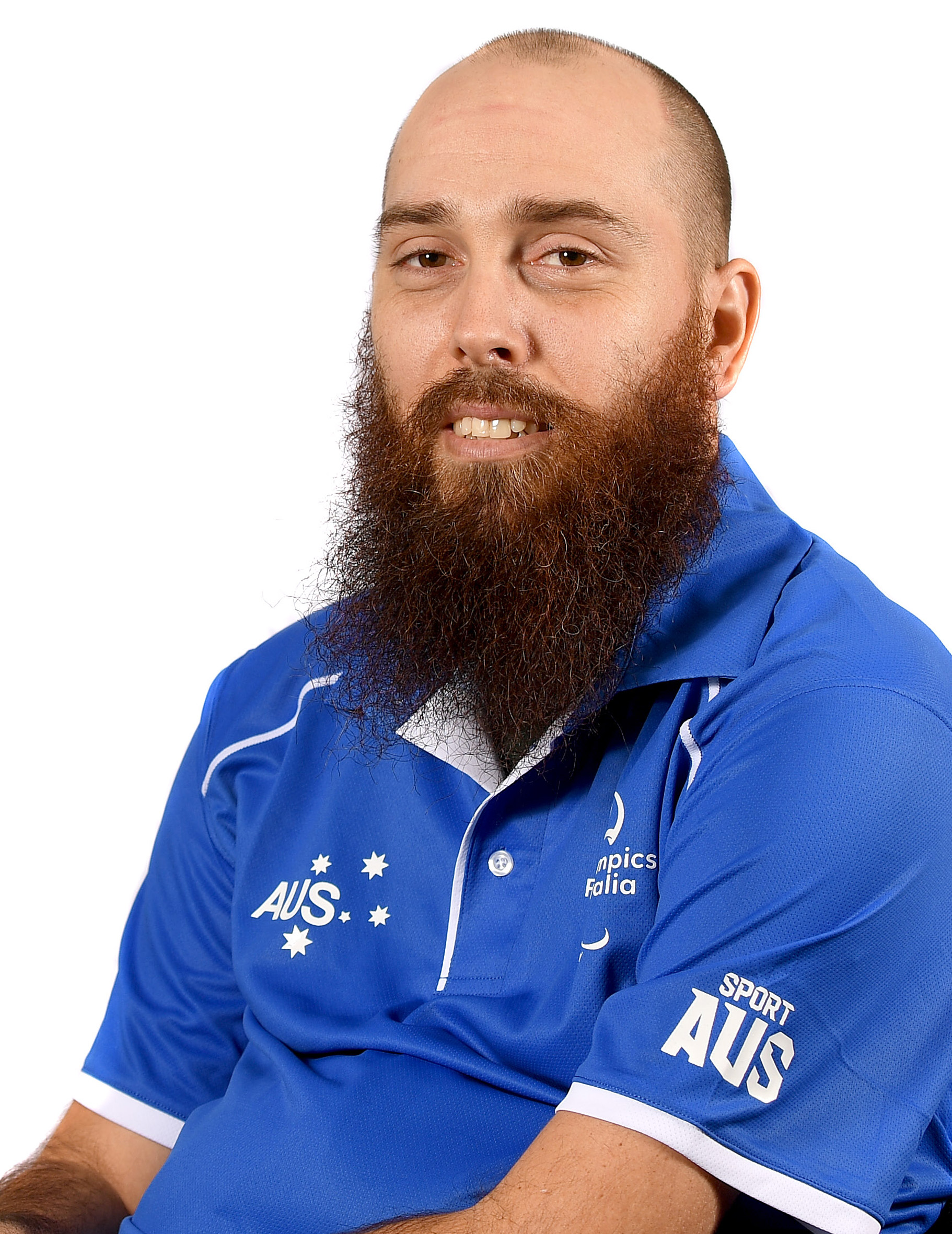
- Ozanne in 2020

Personal information
- National team: Australian national wheelchair rugby team (2013–present)
- Born: 28 April 1987 (age 39)

Sport
- Country: Australia
- Sport: Wheelchair rugby
- Disability class: 0.5
Medal record
Wheelchair rugby
Representing Australia
World Championships
Gold medal – first place	2014 Odense	Mixed
Silver medal – second place	2018 Sydney	Mixed
Gold medal – first place	2022 Vejle	Mixed
Silver medal – second place	2026 São Paulo	Mixed

Michael "Mick" Ozanne (born 28 April 1987) is an Australian wheelchair rugby player. He represented the Steelers at the 2020 Summer Paralympics.

Ozanne was born on 28 April 1987 and lives in Wooloowin, Brisbane, Queensland. Ozanne injured his spinal cord at the level of his C6 vertebra diving into a shallow canal as a 19-year-old. He took up wheelchair rugby after a demonstration of its brutality shortly after his accident. He made his debut for the Australian Steelers in 2013. He was a member of the Australian team that won its first world championship gold medal at the 2014 World Wheelchair Rugby Championships at Odense, Denmark.

At the 2018 IWRF World Championship in Sydney, Australia he was a member of the Australian team that won the silver medal after being defeated by Japan 61–62 in the gold medal game.

At the 2020 Summer Paralympics, the Steelers finished fourth after being defeated by Japan 52–60 in the bronze medal game.COVID travel restrictions led to Steelers not having a team training since March 2020 prior to Tokyo.

Ozanne won his second world championship gold medal at the 2022 IWRF World Championship in Vejle, Denmark, when Australia defeated the United States.
