= Josh Nicholson =

Australian wheelchair rugby player (born 1995)

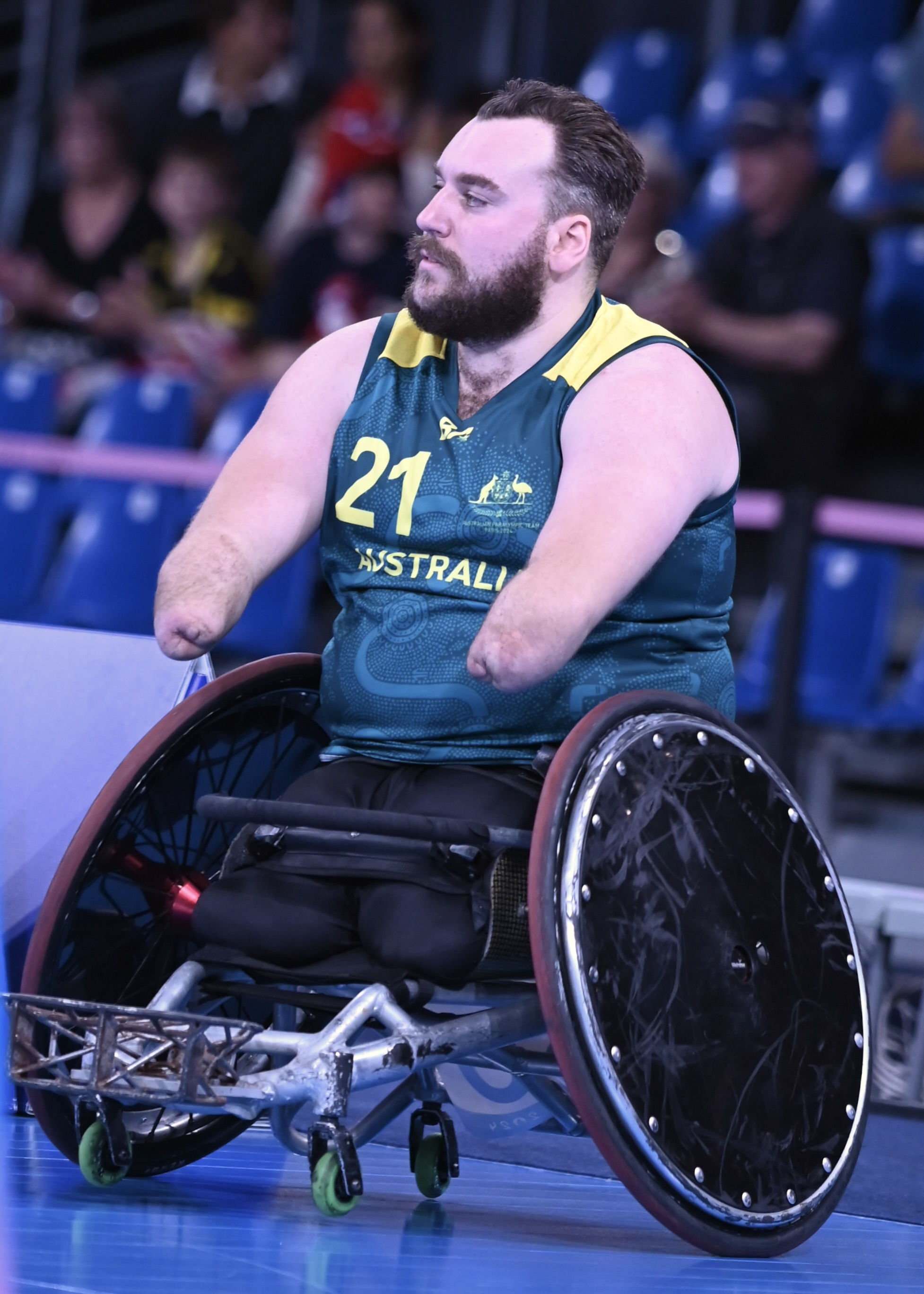

Personal information
- Born: 30 May 1995 (age 31)

Sport
- Sport: Wheelchair rugby
- Disability class: 2.0
- Club: University of Queensland Club
- Team: Australian Steelers (2013–current)
Medal record
Wheelchair rugby
Representing Australia
Paralympic Games
Bronze medal – third place	2024 Paris	Mixed
World Championships
Silver medal – second place	2018 Sydney	Mixed
Gold medal – first place	2022 Vejle	Mixed
Silver medal – second place	2026 São Paulo	Mixed

Josh Nicholson (born 30 May 1995) is an Australian wheelchair rugby player and was a member of the Steelers that won a bronze medal at the 2024 Paris Paralympics.

== Biography ==
Nicholson was born on 30 May 1995. At the age of fourteen months, he lost part of all four limbs to meningococcal disease. He attended Pioneer High School in Mackay, Queensland. He has completed a Bachelor of Architectural Design at Griffith University. In 2024, he is studying a Master of Education.

Nicholson has the nickname ‘Shark Bait’ after playing a shark attack victim in a movie.

== Wheelchair rugby ==
In 2014, he was a member of Queensland junior wheelchair basketball team, the Rolling Thunder that won the Junior National Wheelchair Basketball Championships (Kevin Coombs Cup). He is classified as 2.0 wheelchair rugby player. He made his international debut for the Australian wheelchair rugby team, the Steelers.

At the 2018 IWRF World Championship in Sydney, Australia, he was a member of the Australian team that won the silver medal after being defeated by Japan 61–62 in the gold medal game.

Nicholson won his first world championship gold medal at the 2022 IWRF World Championship in Vejle, Denmark, when Australia defeated the United States.

At the 2024 Summer Paralympics, he was a member of the Steelers that won the bronze medal defeating Great Britain 50–48.
