= Australia national wheelchair rugby team =

National wheelchair rugby team

Australia AU
- IWRF Ranking: 4 (2021)
- Coach: Lewis Quinn (acting 2026-)

Paralympic Games
- Appearances: 7
- Medals: Gold: 2012; 2016; Silver: 2000; 2008; Bronze: 2024

World Championships
- Appearances: 8
- Medals: (gold) Gold: 2014; 2022; (silver) Silver: 2010; 2018; 2026; (bronze) Bronze: 2002

Australia national wheelchair rugby team represents Australia in international wheelchair rugby, is sport with national representation at the Paralympic Games. The Australian Team is known as the 'Steelers'.

Australia has competed at every Paralympics Games since the sport gained full Paralympic Medal status at the 2000 Summer Paralympics. The Steelers also competed in the 1996 Summer Paralympics where wheelchair rugby was a demonstration sport. The 'Steelers' defeated Canada at the 2012 London Games to win its first gold medal. In 2014, it won its first World Championship by defeating Canada. In winning the world championship, the Steelers became the second nation in history to hold both the Paralympic and world championship titles concurrently.

Wheelchair Rugby Australia (WRA) established in 2022 is responsible for the development and growth of the sport of wheelchair rugby in Australia. The sport is not included at the Special Olympics or the Deaflympics.

== The game ==
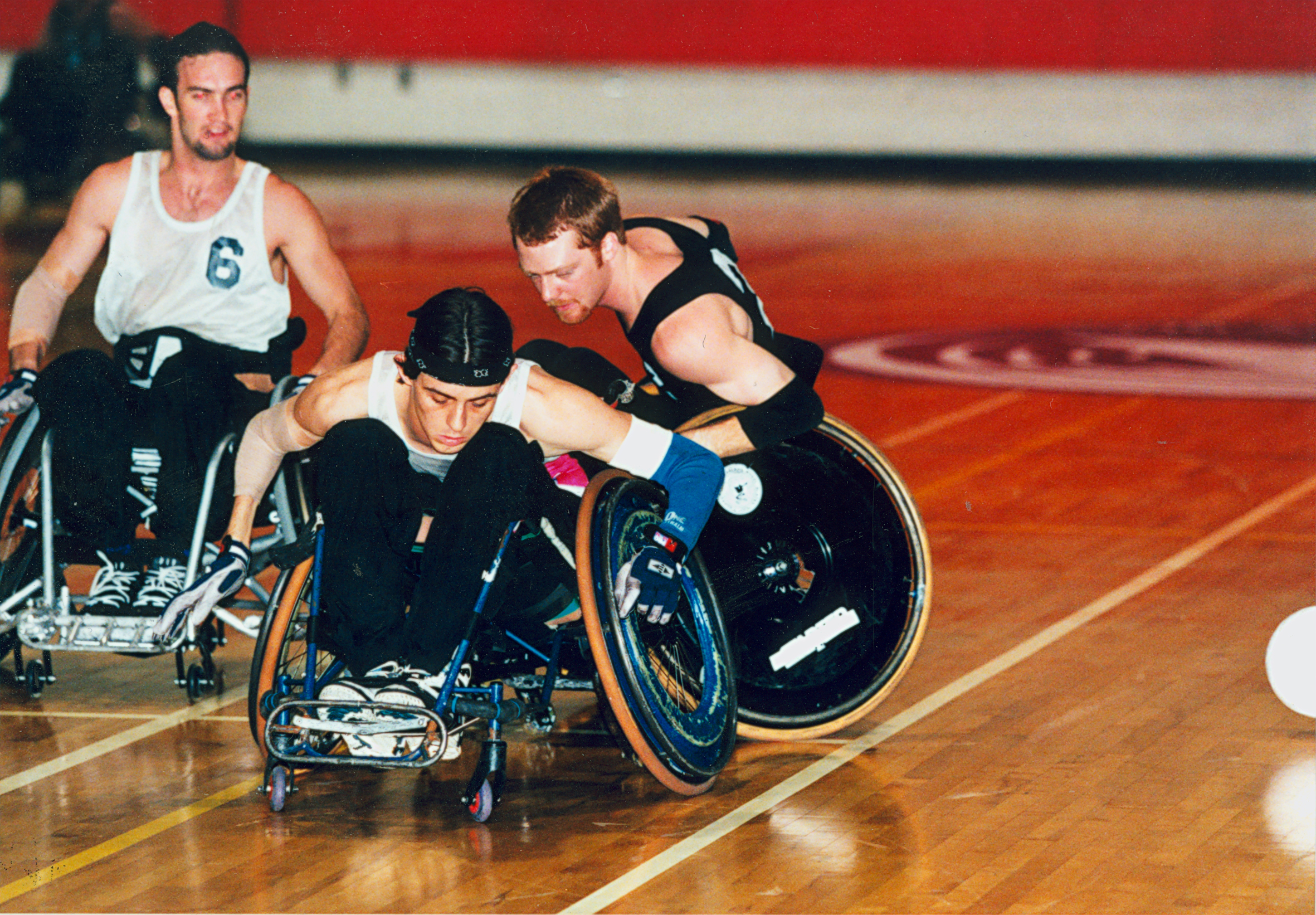
Wheelchair rugby Atlanta Paralympics (11)

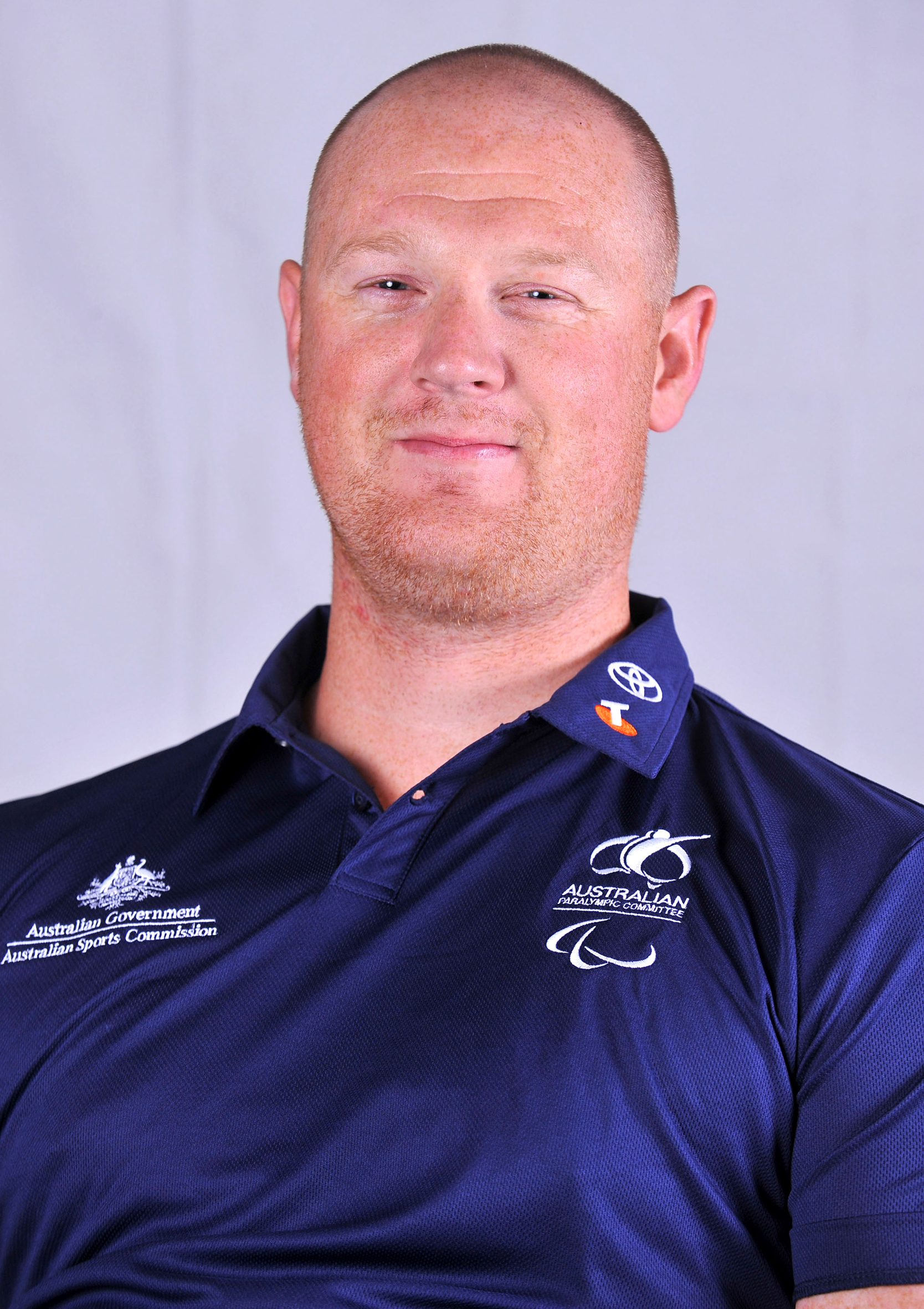
Brad Dubberley Head Coach since 2006

The sport is one of the few contact sports available for wheelchair sport athletes and was originally known as "Murderball". It was developed in Canada during the 1970s and made its way to Australia in 1981.

The sport uses a volleyball for the ball and combines elements of basketball, soccer and ice hockey. The game is played on a basketball sized court. Each team has four players on the court at any one time. It has drawn large crowds at events such as the Paralympics.

== Athlete classifications ==
Wheelchair Rugby is open to athletes with quadriplegia. Athletes competing in wheelchair rugby are classified according to their ability. Players are classified using a points system starting at 0.5 for athletes with the least ability through to 3.5 for athletes with the most ability.

A team can have four players on the court but must not exceed 8 classification points (the combined total of the player's individual classifications).

== Paralympic Games ==
=== Performances 1996–2024 ===
- 1996 – 6th
- 2000 – Silver
- 2004 – 5th
- 2008 – Silver
- 2012 – Gold
- 2016 – Gold
- 2020 – 4th
- 2024 – Bronze

=== 1996 Atlanta ===
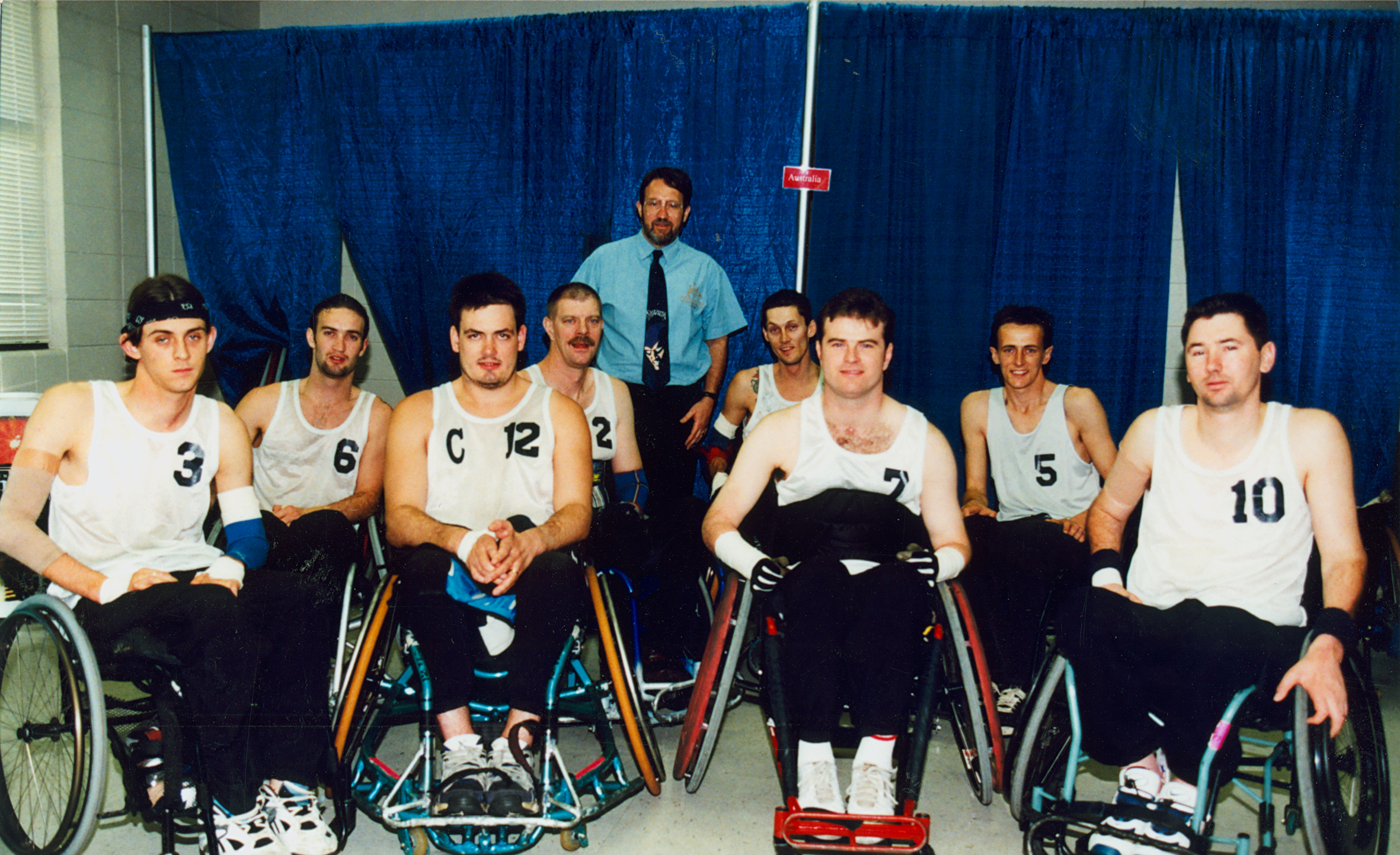
Australian Wheelchair Rugby team at the 1996 Atlanta Paralympics

Australia represented by:
Men – Brett Boylan (2.0), Garry Croker (1.0), Andrew Greenaway (1.5), Rodney Hamilton, David Jacka (0.5), Peter Lock (2.5), Steve Porter (2.5), Baden Whitehead (2.0); Coaches – Darryl Wingard (head coach)
. Wheelchair rugby was a demonstration sport at the 1996 Summer Paralympics. George Hucks was a member of the Australian team. During a practice in Atlanta prior to the start of the games, Hucks broke his kneecap. Hucks, from South Australia, was the team's best player. This was a major loss for the team. Hucks was flown home and another player was flown into Australia to replace him. Australia did not win a single match in wheelchair rugby. They lost to New Zealand 23–39, to Great Britain 33–34, to Canada 24–39, to the USA 18–31 and to Sweden 25–29.
Wheelchair rugby at the 1996 Summer Paralympics for detailed results.

=== 2000 Sydney ===
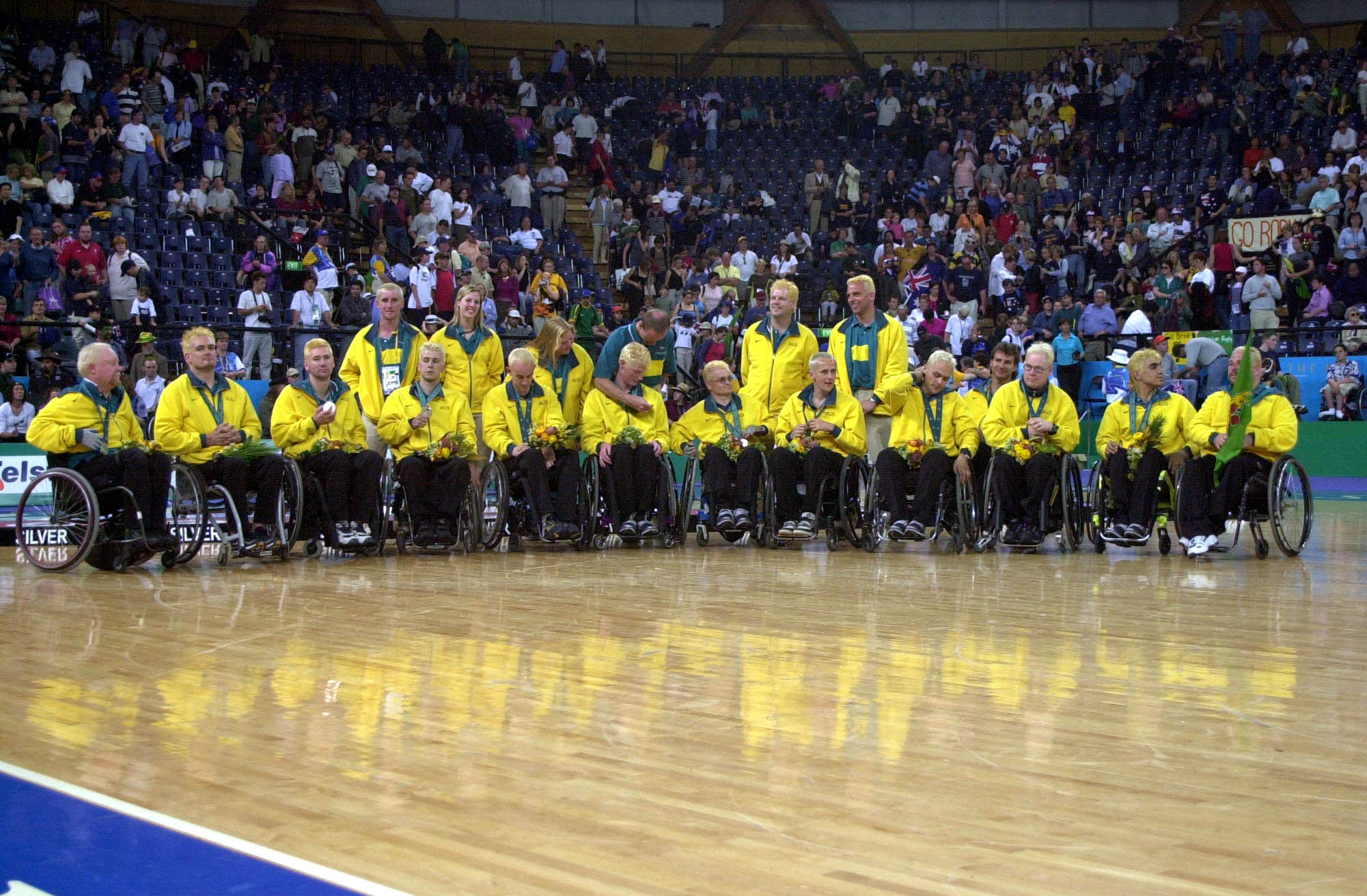
Silver medal winning Australian wheelchair rugby "Steelers" at their medal presentation ceremony at the 2000 Sydney Paralympic Games

Australia represented by:

Men – Bryce Alman (2.0), Brett Boylan (2.0), Cliff Clarke, Garry Croker (1.0), Brad Dubberley (3.5), Nazim Erdem (0.5), Peter Harding, George Hucks (3.0), Tom Kennedy, Craig Parsons, Steve Porter (2.5), Patrick Ryan (2.5)
Coaches – Terry Vinyard (head coach), Glenn Stephens and Nicholas Bailey (Assistant Coaches) Officials – Kim Elwood (manager), David Bonavita, Wendy Poole
The team won the silver medal after losing to the World and Paralympic champions, United States by one point in the final.
Wheelchair rugby at the 2000 Summer Paralympics for detailed results.

=== 2004 Athens ===
Australia represented by:
Men – Bryce Alman (2.0), Ryley Batt (3.5), Grant Boxall (2.5), Brett Boylan (2.0), Brad Dubberley (3.5), Nazim Erdem (0.5), George Hucks (3.0), Kevin Kersnovske (2.0), Steve Porter (2.5), Patrick Ryan (2.5), Ryan Scott (0.5), Scott Vitale (2.0)
Coaches – Terry Vinyard (head coach), Glenn Stephens (assistant coach) Officials – Kim Ellwood (manager), Robert Doidge, Maria Spiller

Australia finished 5th in the tournament.
Wheelchair rugby at the 2004 Summer Paralympics for detailed results.

=== 2008 Beijing ===
Australia represented by:
Men – Bryce Alman (2.0), Ryley Batt (3.5), Grant Boxall (2.5), Shane Brand (1.5), Cameron Carr (2.0), Nazim Erdem (0.5), George Hucks (3.0), Steve Porter (2.5), Ryan Scott (0.5), Greg Smith (2.0), Scott Vitale (2.0)
Coaches – Brad Dubberley (head coach) Officials – Kim Ellwood (Section Manager), Rob Doidge, Noni Shelton, Angela Mansell

Three of the team made their Paralympic debut and Steve Porter attended his fourth Games. The Steelers won the silver medal losing to the United States 53–44 in the final.
Wheelchair rugby at the 2008 Summer Paralympics for detailed results.

=== 2012 London ===
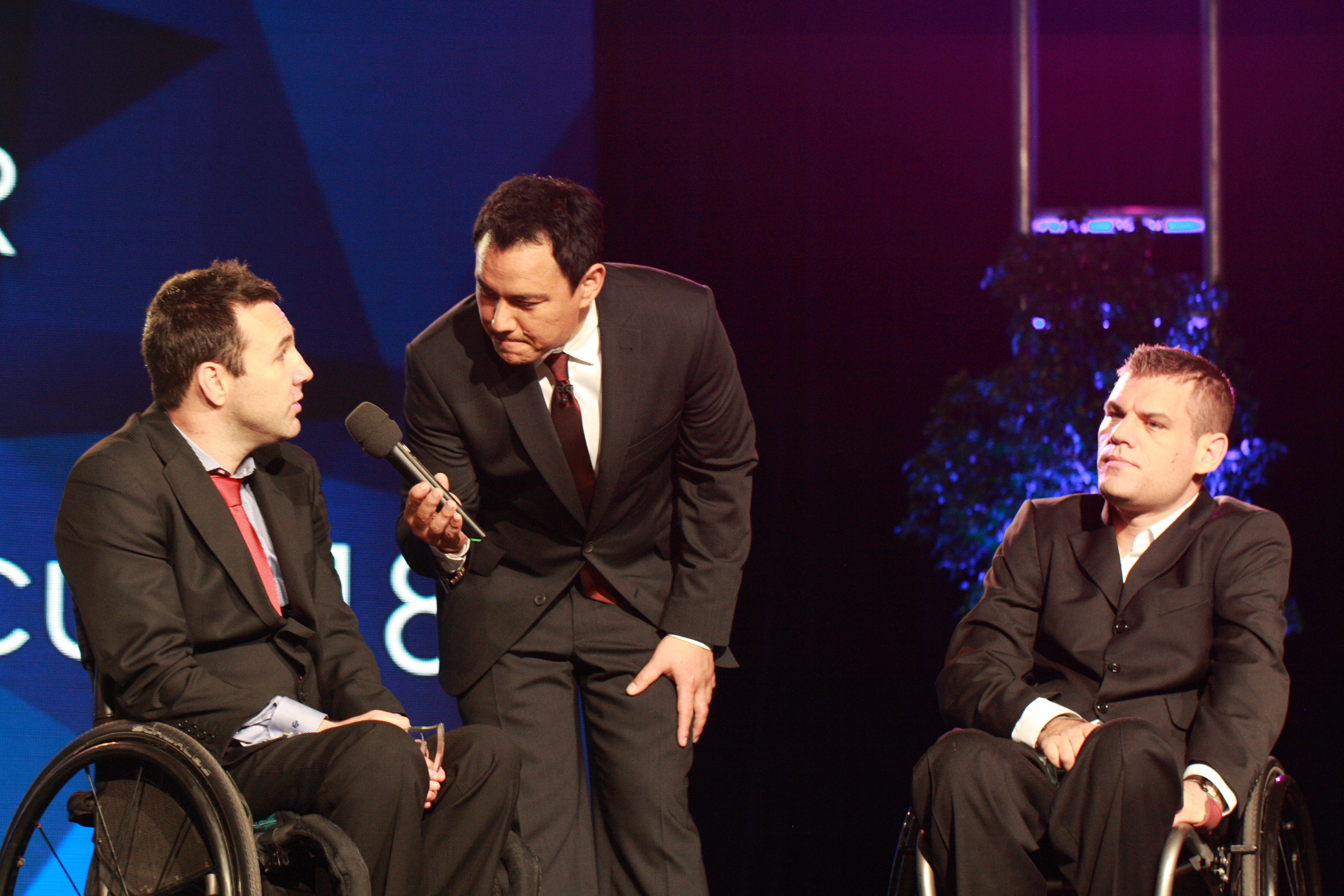
Team co-captains - Cameron Carr and Ryan Scott - interviewed after winning 2012 Team of the Year at the Australian Paralympian of the Year ceremony

Australia represented by:
Men - Nazim Erdem (0.5), Ryan Scott (0.5)(Co-captain), Jason Lees (1.0), Cameron Carr (2.0)(Co-captain), Andrew Harrison (2.0), Greg Smith (2.0), Cody Meakin (2.0), Josh Hose (3.0), Ben Newton (3.0), Ryley Batt (3.5), Chris Bond (3.5)
Coaches – Brad Dubberley (head coach); Officials - Paul Kiteley (Section Manager), Chevvy Cooper (Mechanic), Angela Mansell (Personal Care Assistant), Simon Mole (physiotherapist)
Six players made their first Paralympic Games appearance: Australia defeated Canada 66-51 to win their first Paralympics gold medal.
Wheelchair rugby at the 2012 Summer Paralympics for detailed results.

=== 2016 Rio ===
Australia represented by:
Men – Ryley Batt (3.5), Chris Bond (3.5), Cameron Carr (2.0), Andrew Edmondson (2.0) (d), Nazim Erdem (0.5), Ben Fawcett (0.5) (d), Andrew Harrison (2.0), Josh Hose (3.0), Jason Lees (1.0), Matt Lewis (3.5) (d), Ryan Scott (0.5) (captain), Jayden Warn (3.0)(d)
Coaches – Brad Dubberley (head coach); Greg Smith (Strength and Conditioning Coach), Officials - Sam Allan (Team Leader), Nick Sanders (performance analyst), William Roberts (Mechanic), Darren Pickering (Personal Care/Nurse), Scott Curtis (physiotherapist)

Australia defeated the United States 59-58 in double over time in the gold medal match.
Wheelchair rugby at the 2016 Summer Paralympics for detailed results.

=== 2020 Tokyo ===
Australia represented by:
Men - * Ryley Batt (3.5), Chris Bond (3.5), Ben Fawcett (0.5), Andrew Harrison (2.0), Jake Howe (1.0) (d), Josh Hose (3.0), Jason Lees (1.0), Michael Ozanne (0.5) (d), Richard Voris (1.5) (d), Jayden Warn (3.0) Women - Shae Graham (2.5) (d)
Coaches – Brad Dubberley (coach); Greg Smith (assistant coach); Officials- Sam Allan (Team Leader), Lewis Quinn (Video Analyst), Alek Saunders (Mechanic), Brooke Cranney (physiotherapist), Emma Hall (Psychologist), David Sculac (Carer)
Team lost to Japan in the Semi-final 42-49.
Wheelchair rugby at the 2020 Summer Paralympics for detailed results.

=== 2024 Paris ===
Australia qualified for 2024 Paralympic Games by winning the gold medal at the Paris 2024 Qualification Tournament in Wellington, New Zealand.

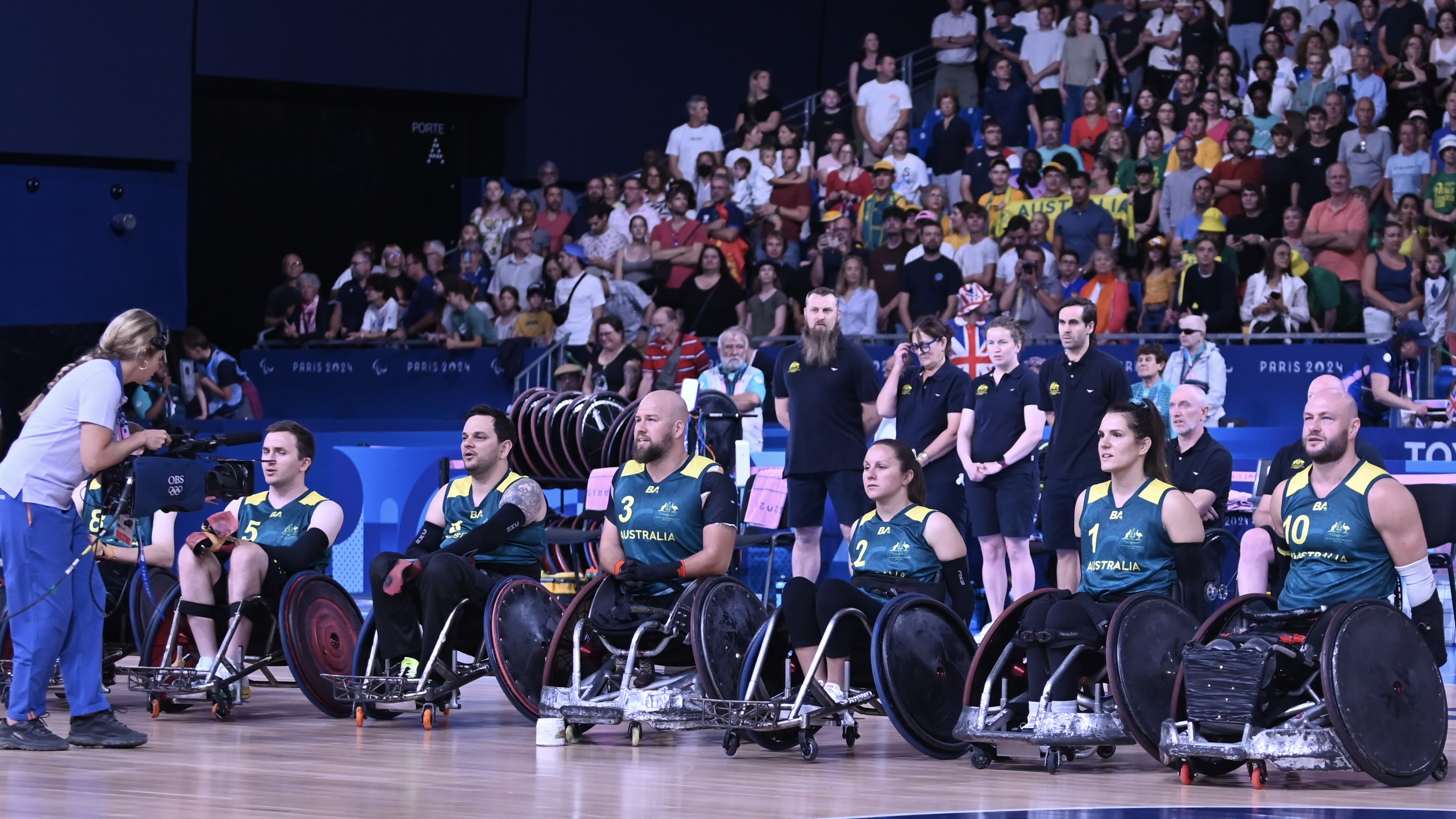
Australian Steelers. Left to right: James McQuillan, Jake Howe, Ryley Batt, Emilie Miller, Ella Sabljak, Chris Bond

Australia represented by:
Men - Ryley Batt (3.5), Chris Bond (3.5), Ben Fawcett (0.5), Brayden Foxley-Connolly (3.5) (d), Andrew Edmondson (2.0),Jake Howe (1.0), Josh Nicholson (2.0) (d), James McQuillan (0.5) (d), Beau Vernon (0.5) (d)
Women- Shae Graham (2.5), Emilie Miller (0.5) (d), Ella Sabljak (2.5) (d)
Coaches - Brad Dubberley (head coach); Greg Smith (assistant coach); Jason Lees (assistant coach); Sam Allan (team manager)

Wheelchair rugby at the 2024 Summer Paralympics for detailed results.

(d) Paralympic Games wheelchair rugby debut

== World Championships ==
=== Performances 1995–2026 ===
- 1995 - Nottwil, Switzerland - 5th
- 1998 - Toronto, Ontario, Canada - 5th
- 2002 - Gothenburg, Sweden - Bronze
- 2006 - Christchurch, New Zealand – 6th
- 2010 - Vancouver, British Columbia, Canada – Silver
- 2014 - Odense, Denmark – Gold
- 2018 - Sydney, Australia - Silver
- 2022 - Vejle, Denmark - Gold
- 2026 - São Paulo, Brazil - Silver

=== 1995 Nottwil, Switzerland ===
Australia represented by:
Men - Wayne Sweeney (0.5), David Jacka (0.5), Andrew Greenaway (1.5), Bruce Stark (1.5), Ian Simpson (2.0), Justin Lunn (2.0), Steve Porter (2.5), Peter Lock (2.5), George Hucks (3.0)

Coaches

=== 1998 Toronto, Ontario, Canada ===
Australia represented by:
Men - Cliff Clarke (0.5), Garry Croker (1.0), Ian Simpson (1.5), Bruce Stark (1.5), Brett Boylan (2.0), Dennis Miller (2.0), Craig Parsons (2.0), Steve Porter (2.5), George Hucks (3.0), Brad Dubberley (3.5)

Coaches - Darryl Wingard (head coach), David Bonavita (assistant coach)

=== 2002 Gothenburg, Sweden, Canada ===
Australia represented by:
Men - Ryan Scott (0.5), Nazim Erdem (0.5), Garry Croker (1.0), Peter Harding (1.5), Bryce Alman (2.0), Brett Boylan (2.0), Kevin Kersnovske (2.0), Grant Boxall (2.5), Steve Porter (2.5), Patrick Ryan (2.5), George Hucks (3.0), Brad Dubberley (3.5)

Coaches - Terry Vinyard (head coach), Glenn Stephens (assistant coach)

Officials - Kim Ellwood (team manager)

=== 2006 Christchurch New Zealand ===
Australia represented by:
Men - Ryan Scott (0.5), Nazim Erdem (0.5), Gary Read (0.5), Bryce Alman (2.0), Kevin Kersnovske (2.0), Steve Porter (2.5), Grant Boxall (2.5), Patrick Ryan (2.5) George Hucks (3.0), Brad Dubberley (3.5), Ryley Batt (3.5)

Coaches - Evan Bennett (head coach), Brad Dubberley (assistant coach)

Officials - Kim Ellwood (manager)

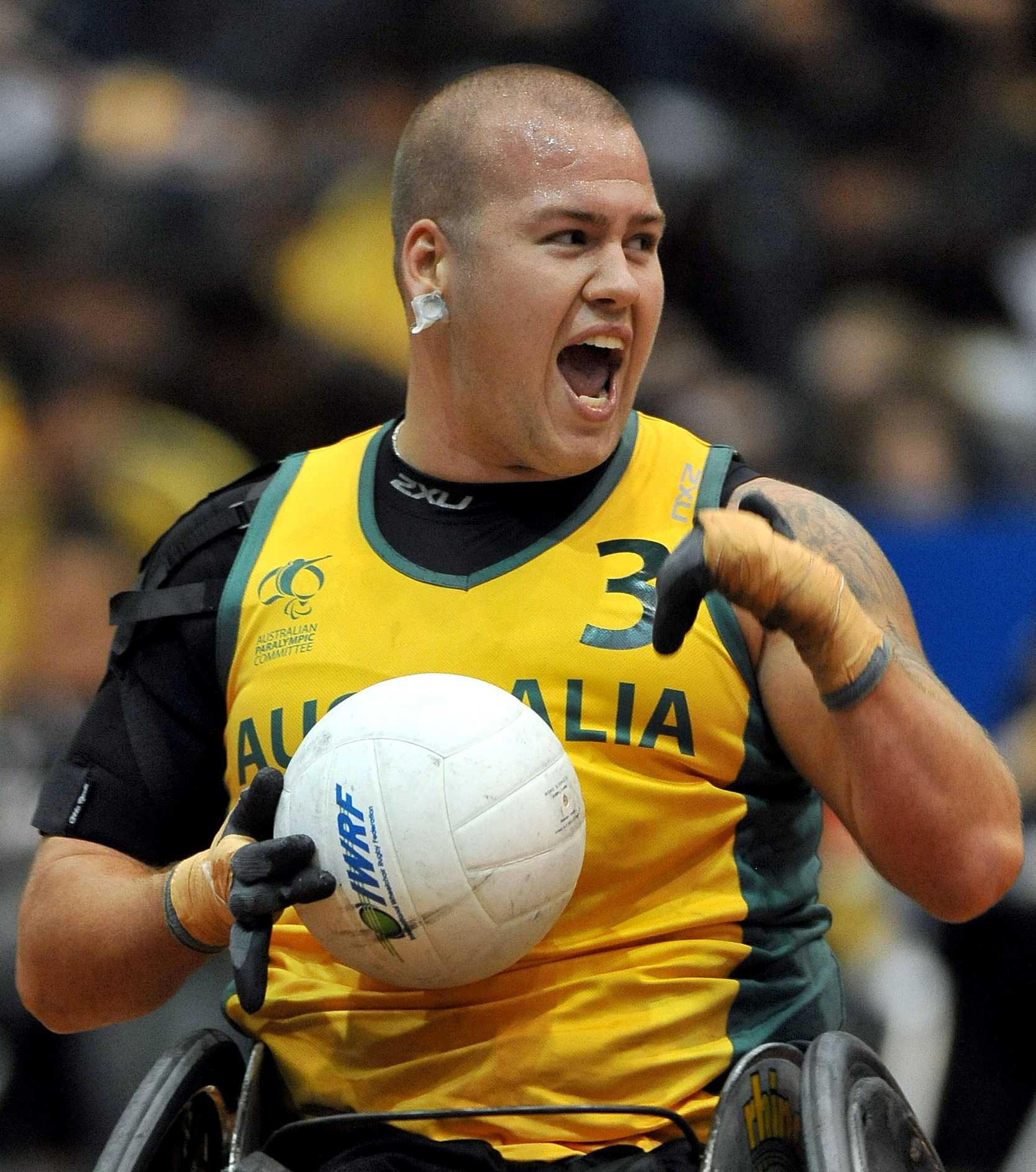
Ryley Batt is regarded as one of the leading players in the world since 2004

=== 2010 Vancouver, British Columbia, Canada ===
Men – Nazim Erdem (0.5), Ryley Batt (3.5), Josh Hose (3.0), Jason Lees (1.0), Bryce Alman (2.0), Ryan Scott (0.5), Steve Porter (2.5), Cameron Carr 2.0, Andrew Harrison (2.0)
Coaches - Brad Dubberley (head coach), Greg Smith (assistant coach)

Officials - Kim Ellwood (team manager), Angela Mansell (Personal Care Assistant), Chevvy Cooper (Mechanic), Brett Robinson (Soft Tissue Therapist)

=== 2014 Odense, Denmark ===
Australia represented by:
Men Nazim Erdem (0.5), Ryley Batt (3.5), Josh Hose (3.0), Jason Ellery (2.0), Michael Ozanne (0.5), Jason Lees (1.0), Chris Bond (3.5), Ryan Scott (0.5), Curtis Palmer (2.5), Cameron Carr (2.0), Jayden Warn (3.0)
Coaches - Brad Dubberley (head coach), Greg Smith (assistant coach)

Officials - Siobhan Crawshay (team manager), Elisha Gartner (Personal Care Assistant), Chevvy Cooper (Mechanic), Nick Sanders (performance analyst), Scott Curtis (physiotherapist)

=== 2018 Sydney, Australia ===
Australia represented by:
Men Ryley Batt (3.5), Chris Bond (3.5), Jayden Warn (3.0), Andrew Edmondson (3.0), Andrew Harrison (2.0), Josh Nicholson (2.0), Jason Lees (1.0), Jake Howe (1.0), Ben Fawcett (0.5), Michael Ozanne (0.5), Ryan Scott (0.5)
Coaches - Brad Dubberley (head coach), Greg Smith (assistant coach)

Officials - Sam Allan - Manager, Victoria Kahn - Physiotherapist, Lewis Quinn - Performance Analyst, Bill Roberts - Mechanic, Scott Curtis - Physiotherapist, David Sculac - Personal Carer, Angela Mansell - Personal Carer, Tim Mannion - Media

=== 2022 Vejle, Denmark ===
Australia represented by:
Team - Ryley Batt (3.5), Chris Bond (3.5), Shae Graham (2.5*), Ella Sabljak (2.5 *), Andrew Edmondson (2.0), Josh Nicholson (2.0), Richard Voris (1.5), Jake Howe (1.0), Ben Fawcett (0.5), James McQuillan (0.5), Emilie Miller (0.5*), Michael Ozanne (0.5) * female athletes receive a 0.5 classification bonus

Coaches - Brad Dubberley (head coach)

=== 2026 São Paulo, Brazil ===
Team - Chris Bond (C) (3.5), Ryley Batt (3.0), Cooper Blackwood (3.0), Shae Graham (2.5*), Ella Sabljak (2.5 *), Andrew Edmondson (2.0), Josh Nicholson (2.0), Lilliana Prucha (2.0*), Beau Vernon (1.0), James McQuillan (0.5), Emilie Miller (0.5*), Michael Ozanne (0.5) * female athletes receive a 0.5 classification bonus

Coaches - Lewis Quinn (acting head coach)

== Asia-Oceania Championship ==
=== Performances 2003-2023 ===
- 2003 - Chiba, Japan - Gold
- 2005 - Carnival City, South Africa - Silver
- 2007 - Sydney, Australia - Gold,
- 2009 - Christchurch, New Zealand - Gold
- 2011 - Seoul, South Korea - Gold
- 2013 - Pretoria, South Africa - Gold
- 2015 - Chiba, Japan Silver
- 2017 - Auckland, New Zealand - Gold
- 2023 - Tokyo, Japan - Silver

== International Wheelchair Rugby Cup ==
- 2023 - Paris, France - Gold

== Recognition ==
- 2012 - Australian Paralympic Committee Awards - Team of the Year (joint winner with Sailing SKUD18 Crew Daniel Fitzgibbon & Liesl Tesch)
- 2014 - AIS Sport Performance Awards - Para Performance of the Year.
- 2016 - AIS Sport Performance Awards - Para Performance of the Year.

== See also ==
- Australia at the Paralympics
- Australia at the 2012 Summer Paralympics
