= Jason Lees =

Australian wheelchair rugby player

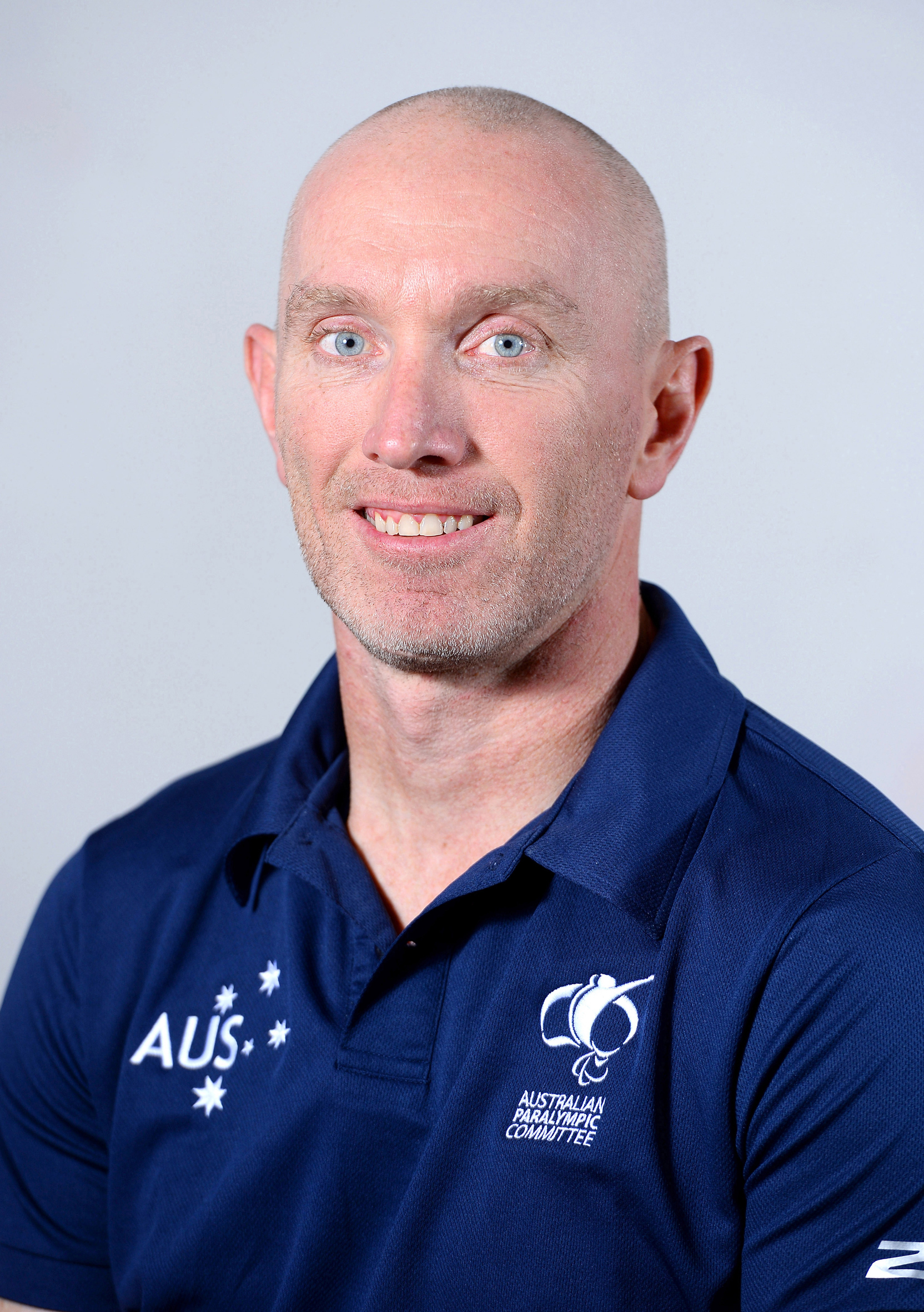
- 2016 Australian Paralympic team portrait of Lees

Personal information
- National team: Australia
- Born: 1 March 1977 (age 49)

Sport
- Country: Australia
- Sport: Wheelchair rugby
- Disability class: 1.0
Medal record
Representing Australia
Wheelchair rugby
Paralympic Games
Gold medal – first place	2012 London	Mixed
Gold medal – first place	2016 Rio	Mixed
World Championships
Silver medal – second place	2010 Vancouver	Mixed
Gold medal – first place	2014 Odense	Mixed
Silver medal – second place	2018 Sydney	Mixed

Jason Lees is a wheelchair rugby player from Victoria and was a member of the Australian Steelers that won the gold medals at the 2012 London and 2016 Rio Paralympics and competed at the 2020 Summer Paralympics.

== Biography ==
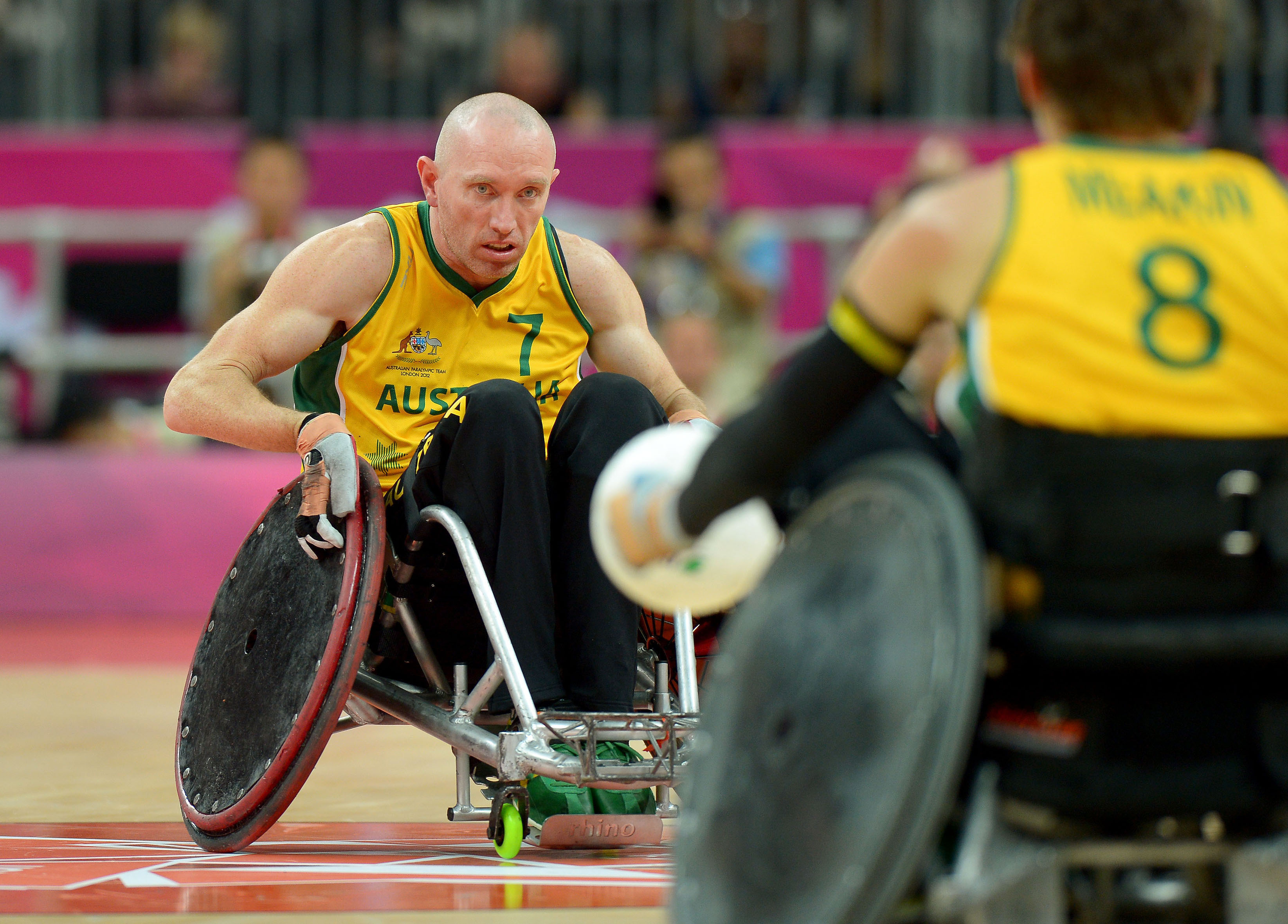
Lees at the 2012 London Paralympics

Lees' life changed in June 2000. Lees, a mechanic at the time, was on a motocross circuit in Laverton, Victoria. His bike ran off the track and the resulting accident led to him breaking his neck. He is paralysed from the chest down but has recovered some mobility since the accident, improving to a point where he can 'stand a bit and use my arms a bit.' His partner is Melanie Josephs and they have two girls. He works part-time for Disability Sport and Recreation.

In 2002, Lees started playing wheelchair rugby on a social, non-competitive level.

In 2009, he made his debut for the Victoria state team and the Australian Steelers. He competed in the 2010 World Rugby Wheelchair Championships, where his team captured a silver medal.

Lees was a member of the Steelers, and they won the gold medal at the 2012 London Paralympics. He was a member of the Australian team that won its first world championship gold medal at the 2014 World Wheelchair Rugby Championships at Odense, Denmark.

He was a member of the team that retained its gold medal at the 2016 Rio Paralympics after defeating the United States 59–58 in the final.

At the 2018 IWRF World Championship in Sydney, Australia, he was a member of the Australian team that won the silver medal after being defeated by Japan 61–62 in the gold medal game.

At the 2020 Summer Paralympics, the Steelers finished fourth after being defeated by Japan 52–60 in the bronze medal game. COVID travel restrictions led to Steelers not having a team training since March 2020 prior to Tokyo.

Lees was awarded an Order of Australia Medal in the 2014 Australia Day Honours "for service to sport as a Gold Medallist at the London 2012 Paralympic Games."

Lees announced his retirement from the Steelers in November 2021 and moved to a Development Coach with Paralympics Australia.
