= James McQuillan =

Australian wheelchair rugby player

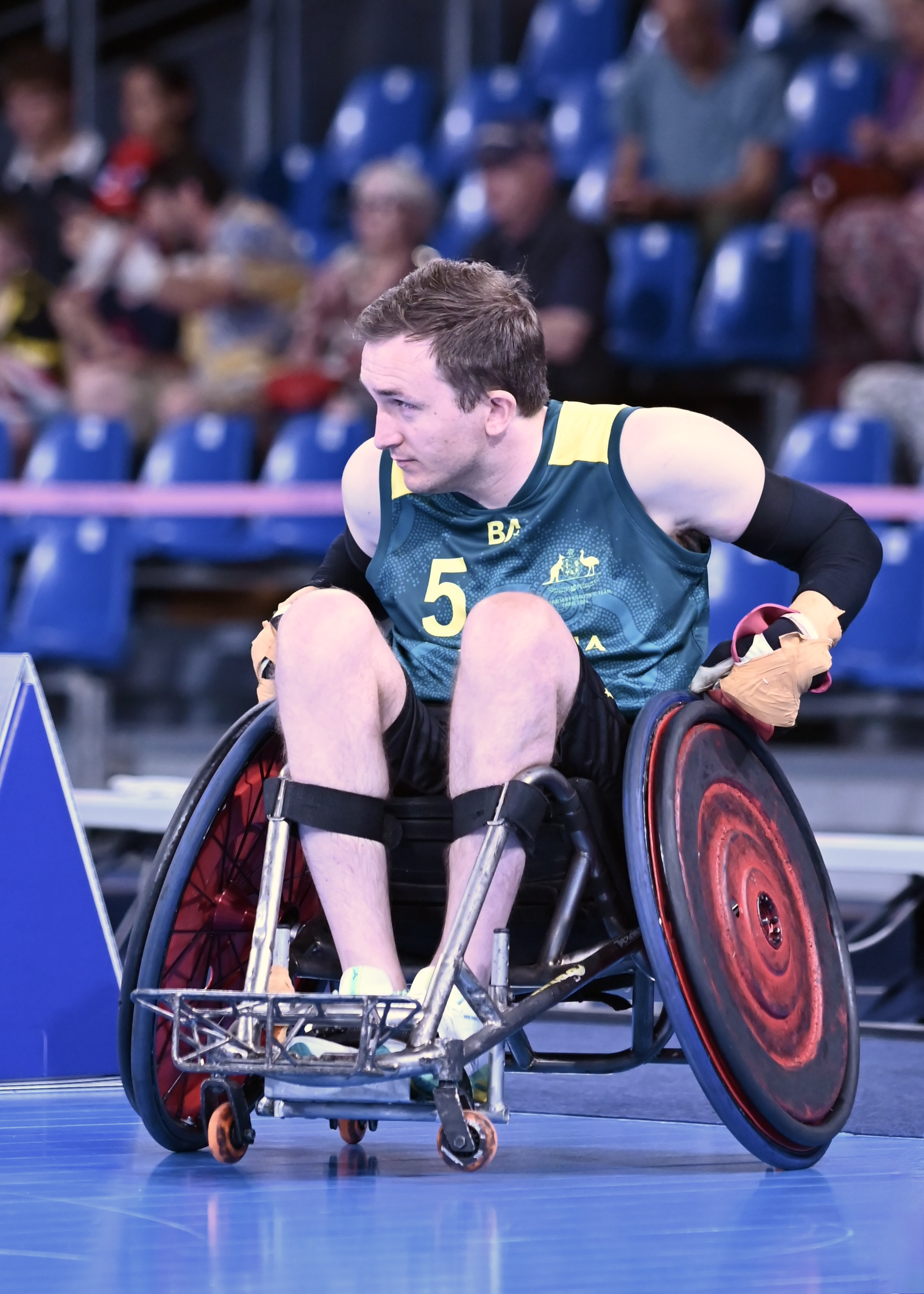

Personal information
- Nationality: Australian
- Born: 28 August 1993 (age 33)

Sport
- Country: Australia
- Sport: Wheelchair rugby
- Disability class: 0.5 (rugby)
- Club: Hunter Wildfires
Medal record
Wheelchair rugby
Paralympic Games
Bronze medal – third place	2024 Paris	Mixed
World Championships
Gold medal – first place	2022 Vejle	Mixed
Silver medal – second place	2026 São Paulo	Mixed

James McQuillan (born 28 August 1993) is an Australian wheelchair rugby player and won a bronze medal with the Steelers at the 2024 Paris Paralympics.

== Biography ==
He grew up on a farm outside the town of Nanneella. In 2014, aged 20, McQuillan fractured his C5 vertebrae playing Australian rules football in Albury, New South Wales and left him a C5 complete quadriplegic. In 2018, he completed an accounting degree at Charles Sturt University. In 2023, he was employed in ANZ Bank's Commercial Division.

In 2022, he married his childhood sweetheart Kathryn.

== Wheelchair rugby ==
Prior to his football accident, he loved playing football in winter and cricket in summer. He began playing wheelchair rugby in 2021, debuting for the Steelers 11 months later in Denmark. He won the 2022 Wheelchair Rugby World Championship with the Australian Steelers. He has a 0.5 classification in wheelchair rugby, and in 2024 plays for Hunter Wildfires in the National Wheelchair Rugby League.

At the 2024 Summer Paralympics, he was a member of the Steelers that won the bronze medal defeating Great Britain 50–48.
