= Brad Dubberley =

Australian wheelchair rugby player and coach

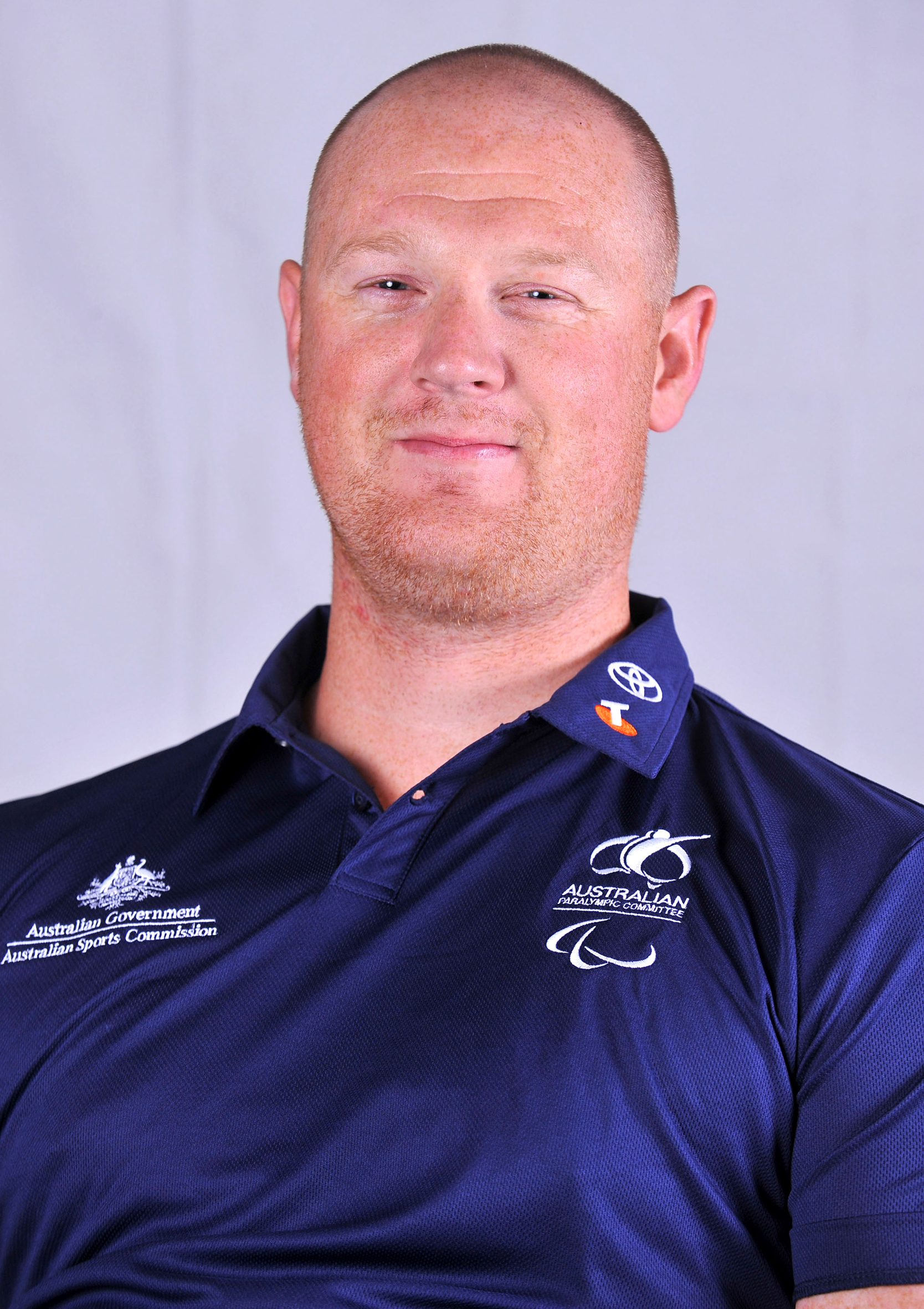
- 2012 Australian Paralympic team portrait of Dubberley

Personal information
- Nationality: Australia
- Born: 28 June 1981 (age 45) Kurri Kurri, New South Wales

Sport
- Disability class: 3.5
Medal record
Wheelchair rugby
Paralympic Games- Athlete
Silver medal – second place	2000 Sydney	Mixed
Paralympic Games- Coach
Silver medal – second place	2008 Beijing	Mixed
Gold medal – first place	2012 London	Mixed
Gold medal – first place	2016 Rio	Mixed
Bronze medal – third place	2024 Paris	Mixed
World Wheelchair Rugby Championships - Athlete
Bronze medal – third place	2002 Gothenburg	Mixed
World Wheelchair Rugby Championships - Coach
Silver medal – second place	2010 Vancouver	Mixed
Gold medal – first place	2014 Odense	Mixed
Silver medal – second place	2018 Sydney	Mixed
Gold medal – first place	2022 Vejle	Mixed

Brad Dubberley (born 28 June 1981) is a former Australian Paralympic wheelchair rugby Head Coach and athlete. He won a silver medal as an athlete at the 2000 Sydney Games. The Steelers won two Paralympic gold medals - 2012, 2016 and two World Championships - 2014, 2022 as Head Coach.

== Playing career ==
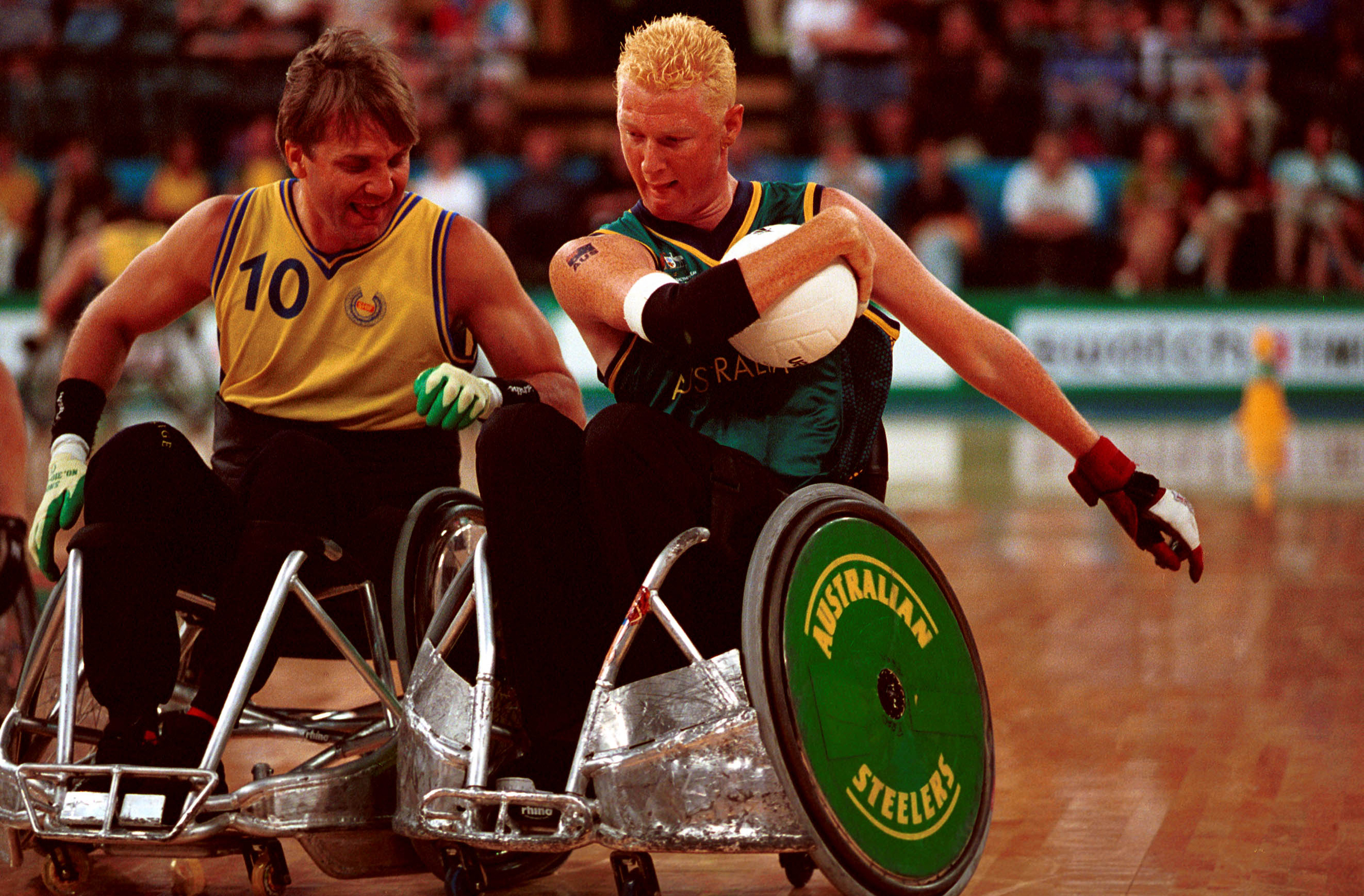
Dubberley with the ball during 2000 Summer Paralympics match

Dubberley was born in the New South Wales town of Kurri Kurri on 28 June 1981. He became a quadriplegic at the age of 12 when he fell down a 50 m cliff while playing with friends in the bush in Victoria. In 1995, at the age of 14, he took up wheelchair rugby as part of the rehabilitation process. His classification level was 3.5. He first represented Australia in 1996 in a test series with New Zealand. At 1998 World Wheelchair Rugby Championships, he was member of the team that came 5th. At the 2000 Sydney Games, he was a member of the team that won the silver medal. At the 2002 World Wheelchair Rugby Championships, he was a member of the team that won the bronze medal. At the 2004 Athens Games, he was a member of the team that came 5th. His last major competition as an athlete was at the 2006 World Wheelchair Rugby Championships, where the team came 6th. During his career as an athlete, he competed in over 70 international competitions.

== Coaching career ==
In 1998 he was the Australian Junior Paralympian of the Year. In 2009, he was awarded the Primary Club of Australia's Sir Roden Cutler Award for his services to wheelchair rugby. Dubberley is a frequent visitor to spinal units offering advice and support. His message is "Don't let the chair, stop you from doing anything".

Dubberley retired from competition in 2006 and in November of that year was appointed as head coach of the Australian Wheelchair Rugby team. He coached the team to a silver medal at the 2008 Beijing Games and the 2010 World Wheelchair Rugby Championships. He is preparing the team for the 2012 London Games. He coached the Australian national wheelchair rugby team at the 2012 Summer Paralympics, which went through the five-day tournament undefeated and won the gold medal. He was the head coach at the 2016 Rio Paralympics where the team won Gold.

At the 2018 World Championships in Sydney, he was Head Coach of the Australian team that won the silver medal after being defeated by Japan 61–62 in the gold medal game. At the 2020 Tokyo Paralympics, the Steelers finished fourth after losing to Japan 52-60 in the bronze medal match.

Dubberley coached the Steelers to win the gold medal at the 2022 IWRF World Championship in Vejle, Denmark, when they defeated the United States .

At the 2024 Paris Paralympics, the Steelers won the bronze medal defeating Great Britain 50-48.

Dubberley resigned as Head Coach in January 2026. In his resignatiuon , he said "Being part of the Steelers, first as an athlete and then as a coach, has been one of the great privileges of my life. Representing Australia at Sydney 2000 and then helping guide the team through so many campaigns and Paralympic cycles is something I’ll always be proud of. After decades as the Head Coach, it feels like the right time to move on to a new challenge, allow the program the space to bring in new leadership that can take the team forward through the next era."
