= Jayden Warn =

Australian wheelchair rugby player (born 1994)

Jayden Warn OAM
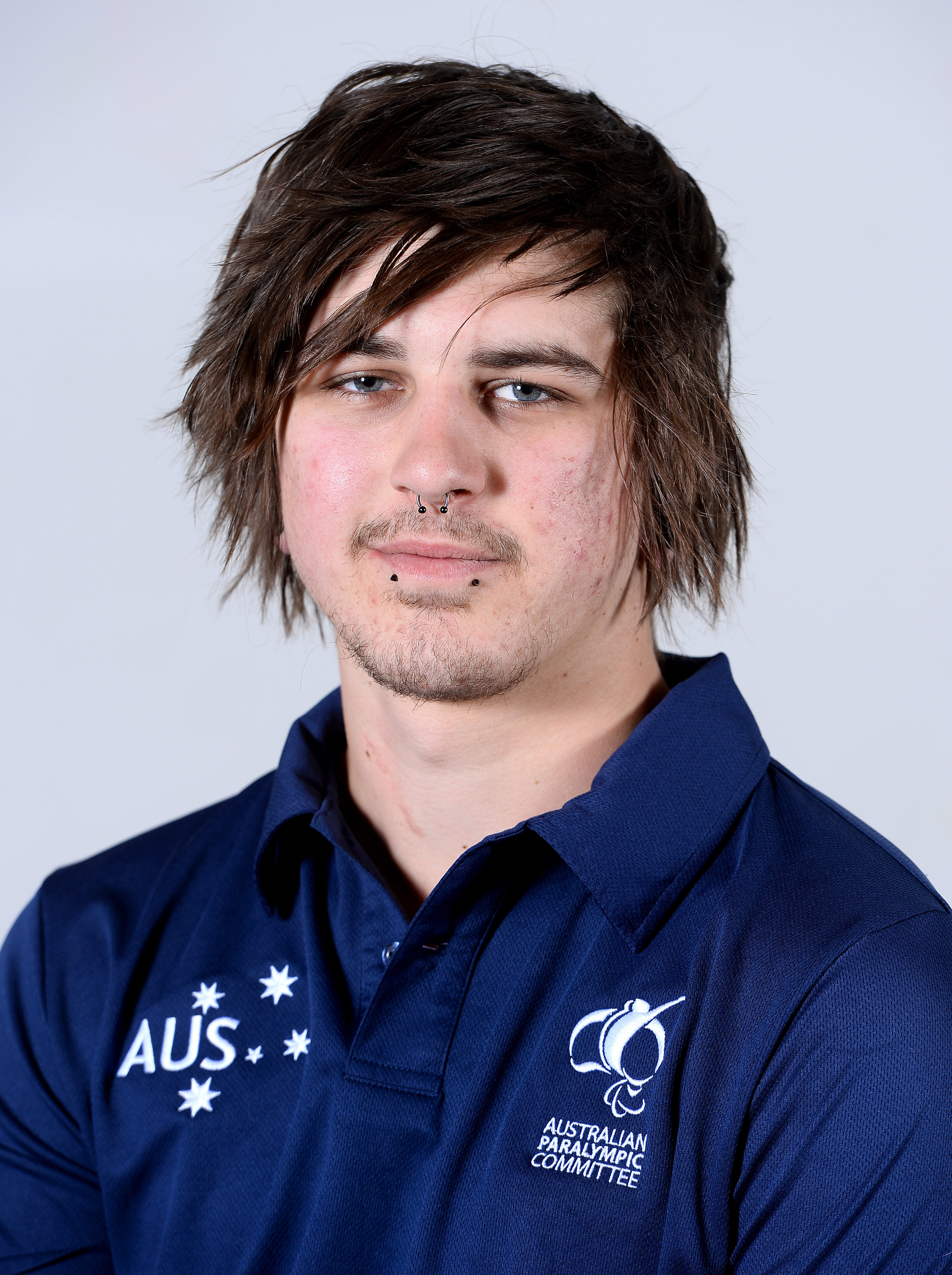
- 2016 Australian Paralympic team portrait

Personal information
- National team: Australia
- Born: 23 May 1994 (age 32)

Sport
- Country: Australia
- Sport: Wheelchair rugby
- Disability class: 3.0
Medal record
Representing Australia
Wheelchair rugby
Paralympic Games
Gold medal – first place	2016 Rio	Mixed
World Championships
Gold medal – first place	2014 Odense	Mixed
Silver medal – second place	2018 Sydney	Mixed

Jayden Warn (born 23 May 1994) is an Australian wheelchair rugby player. He won a gold medal at the 2016 Rio Paralympics as a member of the Australian Steelers and competed at the 2020 Summer Paralympics.

== Biography ==
Warn was born 23 May 1994 and lives in Warragul, Victoria. At the age of 16, he was in a serious car accident as a passenger when a vehicle collided with the passenger side of the car leaving Warn with lifelong injuries. He shattered six vertebrates in his neck and back. He attended Warragul Regional College.

He made his debut for the Australian Steelers in 2013.

He was a member of the Australian team that won its first world championship gold medal at the 2014 World Wheelchair Rugby Championships at Odense, Denmark.

Warn was a member of the team that retained its gold medal at the 2016 Rio Paralympics after defeating the United States 59–58 in the final.

At the 2018 IWRF World Championship in Sydney, Australia, he was a member of the Australian team that won the silver medal after being defeated by Japan 61–62 in the gold medal game.

At the 2020 Summer Paralympics, the Steelers finished fourth after being defeated by Japan 52–60 in the bronze medal game.COVID travel restrictions led to Steelers not having a team training since March 2020 prior to Tokyo.

He was awarded the Order of Australia Medal in 2017.
