= Shae Graham =

Australian wheelchair rugby player

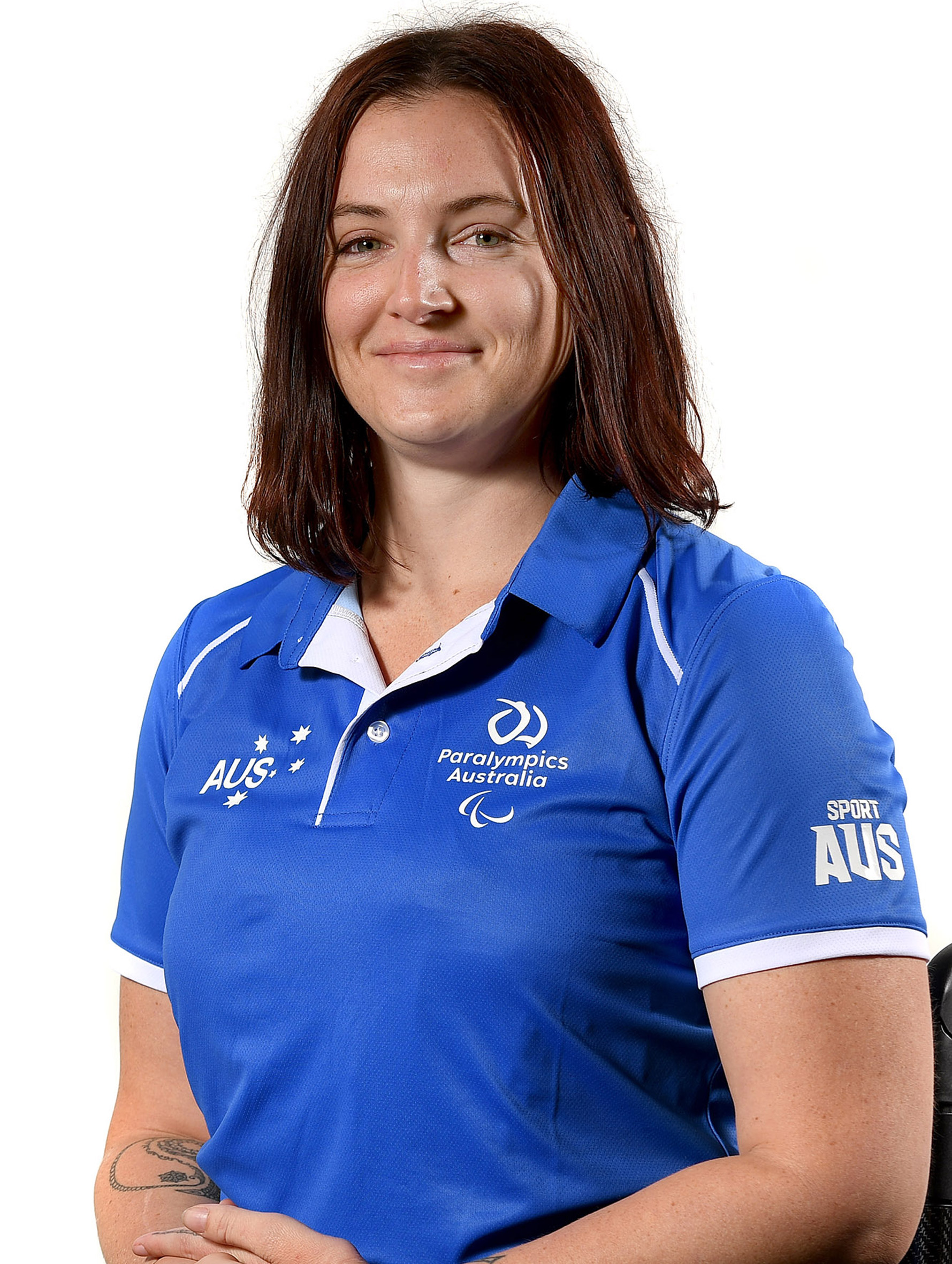
- Shae Graham in 2020

Personal information
- Nationality: Australian
- Born: 16 December 1986 (age 39)

Sport
- Country: Australia
- Sport: Wheelchair rugby
- Disability class: 2.5
- Club: Box Hill R.U.F.C
Medal record
Wheelchair rugby
Representing Australia
Paralympic Games
Bronze medal – third place	2024 Paris	Mixed
World Championships
Gold medal – first place	2022 Vejle	Mixed
Silver medal – second place	2026 São Paulo	Mixed

Shae Graham (born 16 December 1986) is an Australian wheelchair rugby player. She competed at the 2020 Tokyo Paralympics, her first Games and the first female to be selected for the Steelers. At the 2024 Paris Paralympics, she won a bronze medal.

== Personal ==
Shae Graham was born 16 December 1986. At the age of 18, she was a backseat passenger in a car crash in Mackay, Queensland. The accident resulted in her fracturing her spine and pelvis, and incurring a brain injury and ruptured bladder. Graham has several degrees – Bachelor of Business/Arts, Central Queensland University and Master of Information Management, RMIT. She works as a librarian. In 2021, she lives in Moonee Ponds, Victoria.

== Wheelchair rugby ==
She is classified as 2.5 point wheelchair rugby player. Graham made her international debut at the 2019 Four Nations tournament in Alabama, USA, where she played big minutes for the Australian wheelchair rugby team. She became the first woman selected for Australian wheelchair rugby team.

At the 2020 Summer Paralympics, the Steelers finished fourth after being defeated by Japan 52–60 in the bronze medal game. COVID travel restrictions led to Steelers not having a team training since March 2020 prior to Tokyo.

Graham won her first world championship gold medal at the 2022 IWRF World Championship in Vejle, Denmark, when Australia defeated the United States.

At the 2024 Summer Paralympics, she was a member of the Steelers that won the bronze medal defeating Great Britain 50–48.
