= Jason Ellery =

Australian wheelchair rugby player

Personal information
- National team: Australia (2013–present)
- Born: 30 May 1986 (age 40)

Sport
- Country: Australia
- Sport: Wheelchair rugby
- Disability class: 3.0
Medal record
Representing Australia
Wheelchair rugby
World Championships
Gold medal – first place	2014 Odense	Mixed

Jason Ellery is an Australian wheelchair rugby player.

Ellery was born on 30 May 1986 and lives in Narre Warren, Victoria. He broke his neck in a snowboarding accident in Canada on Anzac Day in 2011. He took up wheelchair rugby after months of rehabilation. He made his Australian Steelers debut in 2013. The Lions Club of Endeavour Hills purchased for him a custom-built wheelchair valued at about $6500 so that he could pursue his wheelchair rugby career. He was a member of the Australian team that won its first world championship gold medal at the 2014 World Wheelchair Rugby Championships at Odense, Denmark. In 2014, he is a Victorian Institute of Sport scholarship holder.
