= Cameron Carr (wheelchair rugby) =

Australian wheelchair rugby player

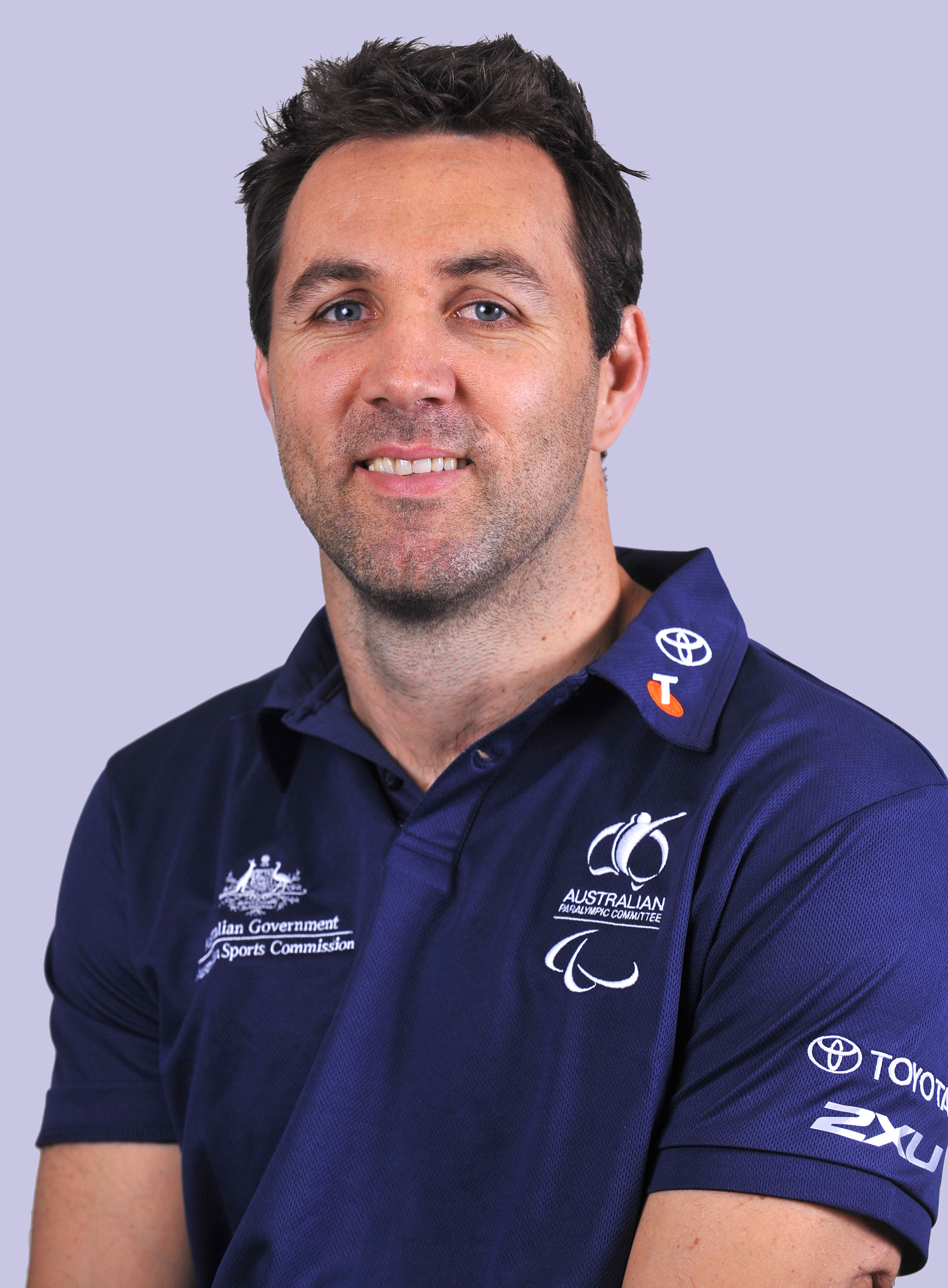
- 2012 Australian Paralympic team portrait of Carr

Personal information
- Born: 13 August 1977 (age 49)

Sport
- Country: Australia
- Sport: Wheelchair rugby
- Disability class: 2.0
Medal record
Paralympic Games
Silver medal – second place	2008 Beijing	Mixed
Gold medal – first place	2012 London	Mixed
Gold medal – first place	2016 Rio	Mixed
World Championships
Silver medal – second place	2010 Vancouver	Mixed
Gold medal – first place	2014 Odense	Mixed
- Updated on 25 July 2016

Cameron Carr is an Australian Paralympic wheelchair rugby player. He has won a silver medal at the 2008 Paralympics and gold medals at the 2012 and 2016 Paralympics.

== Biography ==
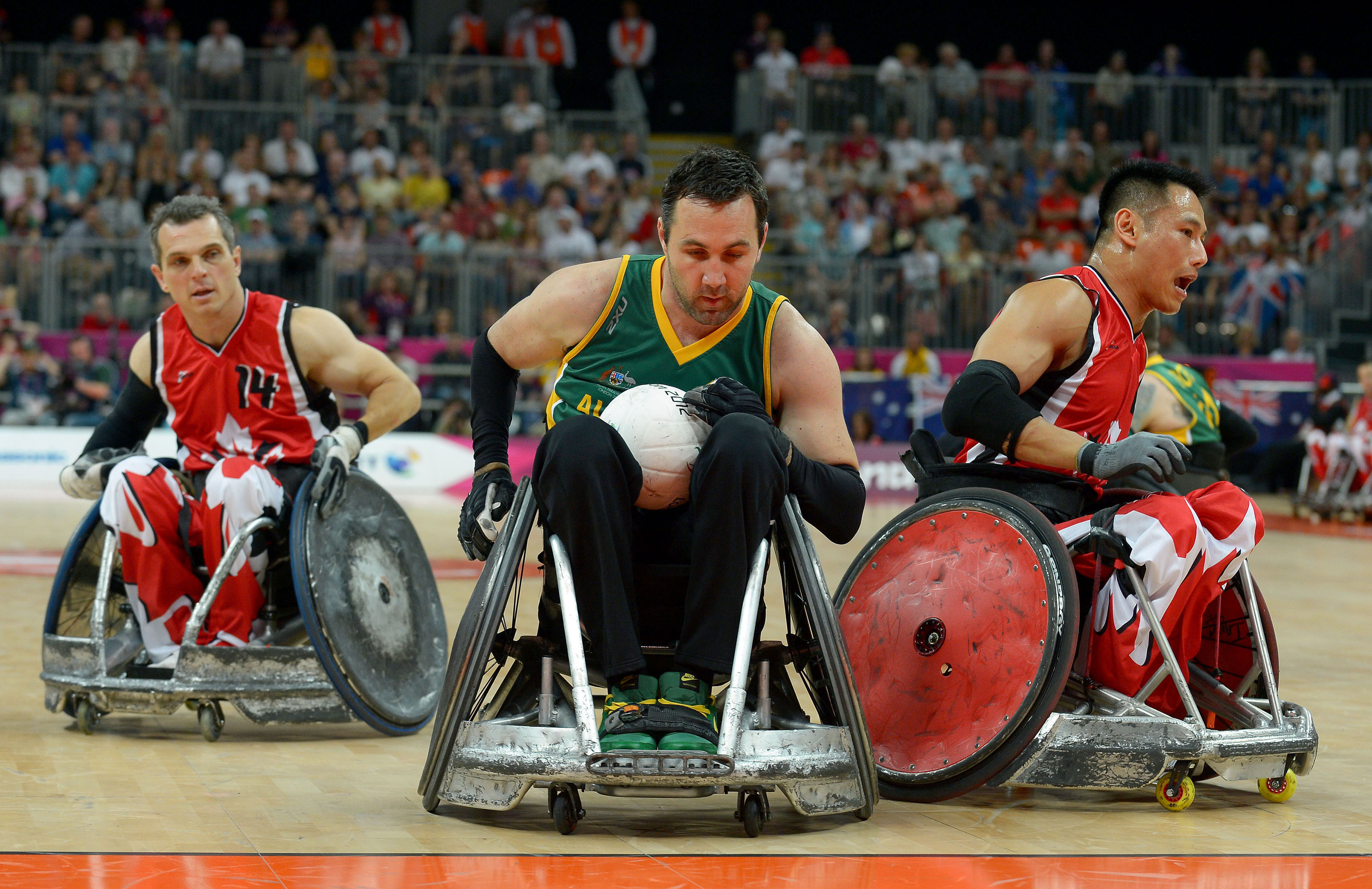
Carr at the 2012 London Paralympics

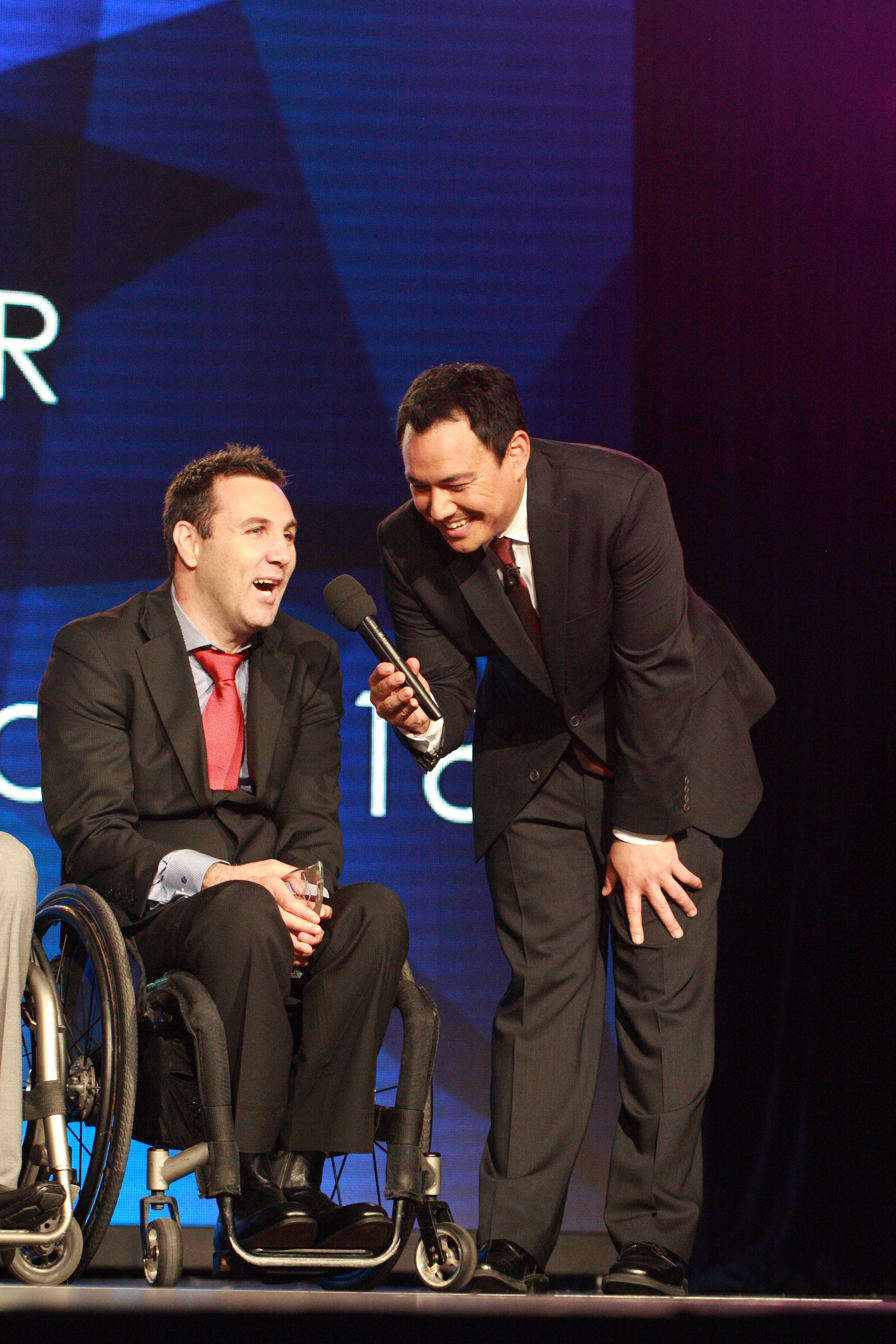
Carr being interviewed on behalf of his team after winning the Australian 2012 Team of the Year

Cameron Michael Carr was born on 13 August 1977, and lives in Brisbane, Queensland. His father is Norm Carr, Queensland rugby league State of Origin representative. At 19 years old, Carr just signed a contract with the Sydney Roosters. The weekend before moving to Sydney, Carr was involved in a motor vehicle collision when a friend driving him home from a 21st birthday fell asleep at the wheel. His neck was broken as a result of the crash.

He first competed in wheelchair rugby in 2003 and was selected for Australia in 2005. He won a silver medal at the 2008 Beijing Paralympics and a gold medal at the 2012 London Paralympics. He was a member of the Steelers team that won silver medal at the 2010 World Wheelchair Rugby Championships in Vancouver and a gold medal at the 2014 World Championships in Odense, and the team that retained its gold medal at the 2016 Rio Paralympics after defeating the United States 59–58 in the final.

Carr was awarded an Order of Australia Medal in the 2014 Australia Day Honours "for service to sport as a Gold Medallist at the London 2012 Paralympic Games."

Carr is married with three children; one son and two twin daughters.
