= Richard Voris (Wheelchair rugby) =

Australian wheelchair rugby player

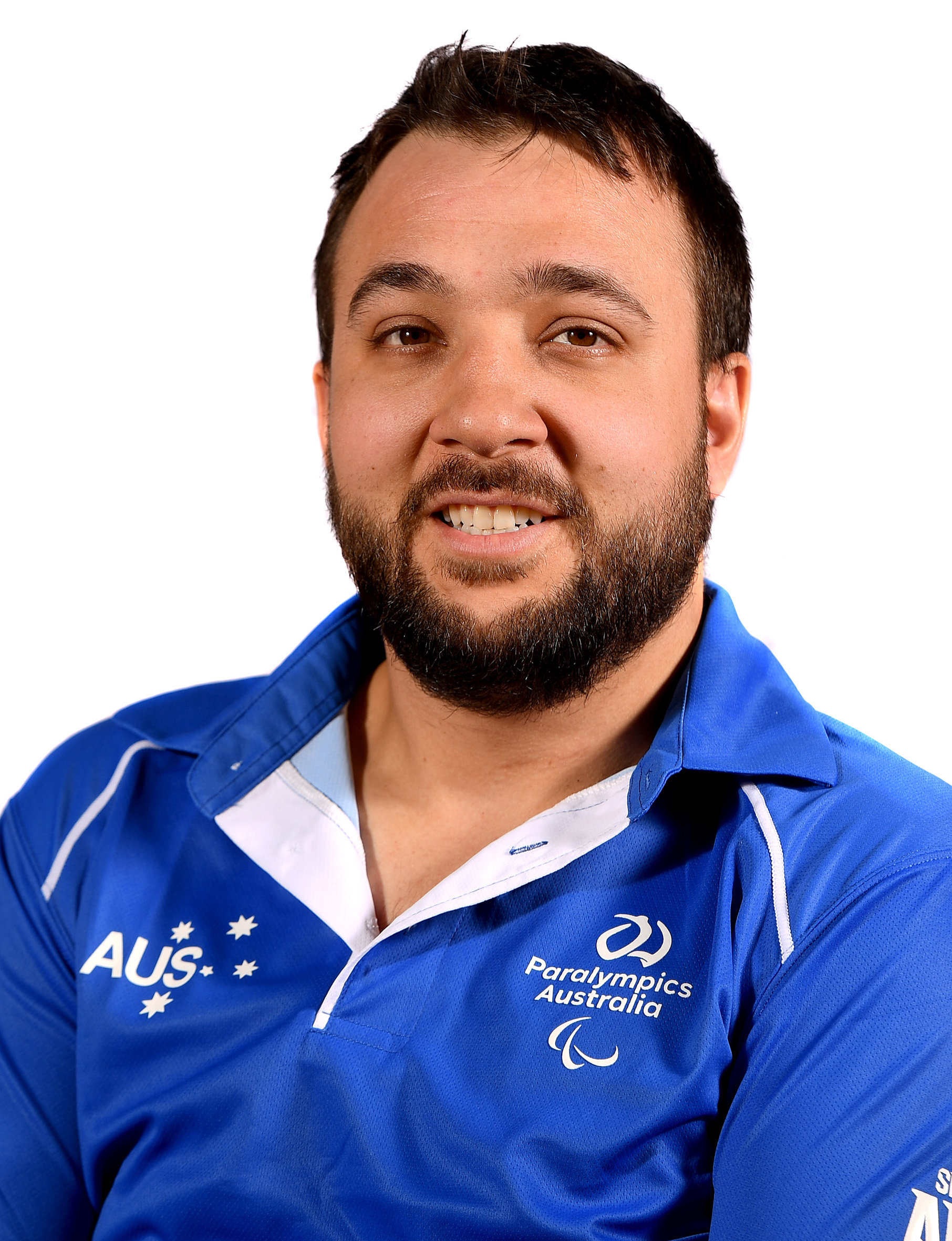
- Richard Voris in 2020

Personal information
- Nationality: Australian
- Born: 14 May 1991 (age 35)

Sport
- Country: Australia
- Sport: Wheelchair rugby
- Disability class: 1.5
Medal record
World Championships
Gold medal – first place	2022 Vejle	Mixed

Richard Voris (born 14 May 1991) is an Australian wheelchair rugby player. He represented the Steelers at the 2020 Summer Paralympics, his first Games.

== Personal ==
Richard Voris was born 14 May 1991. As a 19-year-old apprentice electrician, one of friends jumped on Voris in a backyard swimming pool and crushed his neck. This left Voris as an incomplete C6-7 quadriplegic. In 2012, he contracted an autoimmune disease called myasthenia gravis. In 2018, his myasthenia gravis was triggered and led to him undergoing plasmapheresis every two weeks and having steroid injections to help offset fatigue.

He grew up in Winmalee, New South Wales. In 2021, he lives in Sydney, New South Wales.

== Wheelchair rugby ==
Voris is classified as 1.5 wheelchair rugby player. He took up wheelchair rugby two years after his accident. Voris missed out on selection for 2016 Summer Paralympics. He is a member of NSW Gladiators team.

At the 2020 Summer Paralympics, the Steelers finished fourth after being defeated by Japan 52–60 in the bronze medal game. COVID travel restrictions led to Steelers not having a team training since March 2020 prior to Tokyo.

Voris won his first world championship gold medal at the 2022 IWRF World Championship in Vejle, Denmark, when Australia defeated the United States.

In December 2024, he was selected in the second Australian Institute of Sport (AIS) Gen32 Coach Program.
