= Grant Boxall =

Australian wheelchair rugby player

Personal information
- Nationality: Australia
- Born: 19 July 1976 (age 50) Attadale, Western Australia
- Height: 186 cm (6 ft 1 in)
- Weight: 75 kg (165 lb)

Sport
- Sport: Wheelchair rugby
- Disability class: 2.5 (previously 3.5)
- Club: Western Australia
Medal record
Wheelchair rugby
Paralympic Games
Silver medal – second place	2008 Beijing	Mixed

Grant Boxall (born 19 July 1976) is an Australian Paralympic wheelchair rugby player.

== Personal ==
Boxall was born on 19 July 1976. He was injured in a surfing accident near the Western Australian town of Yallingup in 2000. The night before the accident, he had promised his girlfriend he would not go surfing, but the following day, he went anyway and took his girlfriend with him. While surfing that day, he hit "his head on a rock hard enough for his neck to break, the vertebrae slicing into his spinal cord, leaving him a quadriplegic." He was rescued by professional surfer Taj Burrow. About two months after he left the hospital, Boxall began playing wheelchair rugby. Prior to becoming disabled, he had little experience playing contact sports like rugby. The sport aided in his recovery process. In 2005, he was working on moving to the United States in order to continue his career as a wheelchair rugby player. When not competing in sport, he is a sport development officer. in 2008 he started on a twenty-two month journey to rebuild a 1968 Mercedes-Benz He paid A$650 for the car and refitted the controls so he could control it using his hands.

== Wheelchair rugby ==
Boxall started playing wheelchair rugby in 2000 at the age of 24. His player classification is 2.5. In 2002, he was classified as a 3.5 player. In 2004, he was a Queensland Academy of Sport scholarship recipient. In 2008, he was a Western Australian Institute of Sport scholarship recipient.

=== State team ===
Boxall was a member of the Western Australia state wheelchair rugby team, the Black Ducks, in 2005. He started playing for the team in 2000.

=== National team ===
Boxall was selected in the Australian National Team in 2001. Boxall competed in wheelchair rugby events in the United States, South Africa, Sweden and New Zealand and represented Australia in the 2002 and 2006World Championships and the 2004 Athens and 2008 Beijing Paralympic Games. He won a silver medal at the 2008 Beijing Games in the mixed wheelchair rugby event. He was on the Australian team that competed in the 2001 Oceania Zonal Championships that finished first. He was also part of the Australian national side that finished in third at the 2002 World Championships. He was also part of the 2002 team that competed at the World Rugby Challenge in Canada. In 2005, he was part of the Australian team that finished in second at the Oceania Zonal Championships. In 2007, he was part of the team that competed at the Oceania Wheelchair Rugby Championships. In 2008, he was part of the Australian team that finished first at the Rugby Super Series.

=== Club rugby ===
In 2001, he played club rugby in New Zealand. In 2005 and 2006, he played for Australia's National Wheelchair Rugby League (NWRL). In 2006, he was playing for a Queensland-based NWRL team. In 2007, he played club rugby for the first time in the United States. In 2008, he played for the NWRL's West Coast Enforcers, where he was the team's captain.

== Recognition ==
Boxall has been recognised for his wheelchair rugby performance. In 2001, he was named the Rookie of the year by the National Wheelchair Rugby League. In 2002, he was named the New Zealand Rookie of the Year. In 2005 and 2006, he was recognised as the best in his classification by the National Wheelchair Rugby League. In 2005, he was named the Best in Classification in the New Zealand league.
