= Bryce Alman =

Australian wheelchair rugby player

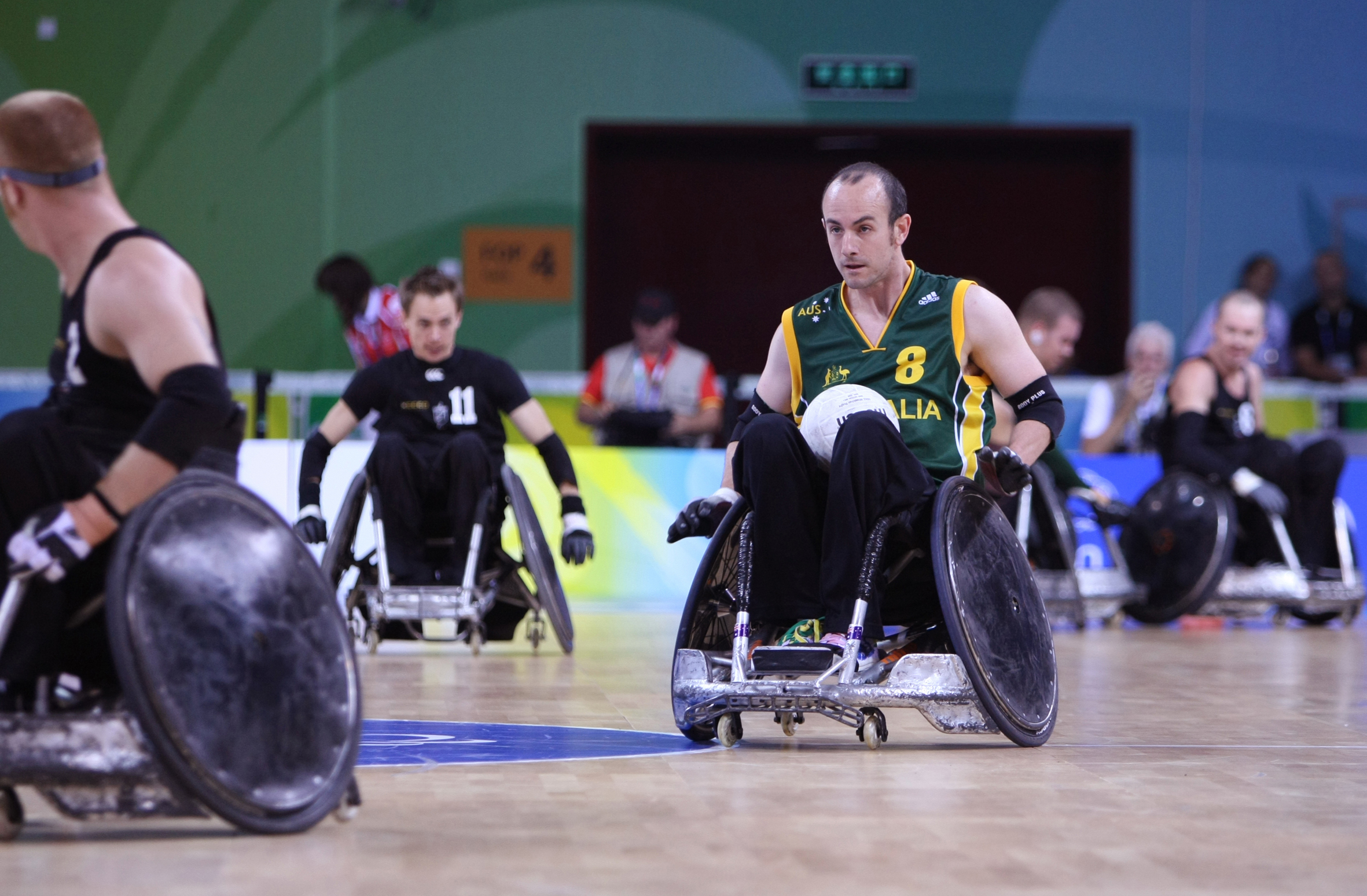

Personal information
- Nationality: Australia
- Born: 19 January 1976 (age 50) North Dandenong, Victoria
Medal record
Wheelchair rugby
Paralympic Games
Silver medal – second place	2000 Sydney	Mixed
Silver medal – second place	2008 Beijing	Mixed
World Championships
Silver medal – second place	2010 Vancouver	Mixed

Bryce Alman (born 19 January 1976 in North Dandenong, Victoria) is an Australian Paralympic wheelchair rugby player. He was part of the Australian Steelers at the 2000 Sydney, 2004 Athens and 2008 Beijing Paralympics, and won two silver medals with the team in 2000 and 2008.
