= David Jacka =

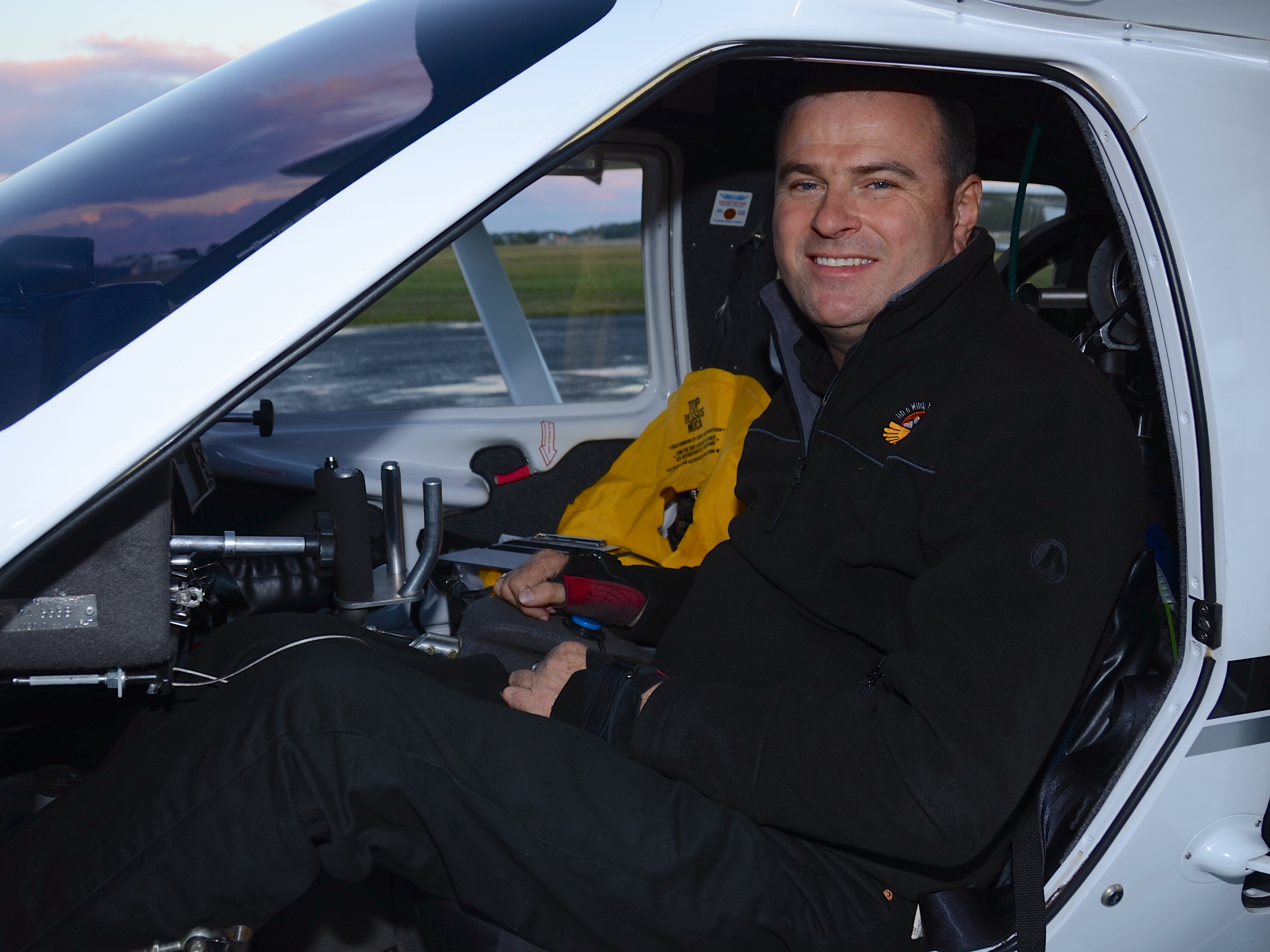
- Jacka lands in Wynyard, Tasmania, on the first day of his 38-day solo flight around Australia. 29 April 2013.

David Brian Jacka OAM (born 14 July 1968) is an aviator and disability advocate. On 5 June 2013, Jacka became the first person with quadriplegia to fly solo around the coast of Australia. The trip took 38 days. He flew a Jabiru J230 with adaptations that he designed to enable him to fly. The purpose of the flight was to spread the message of the charity founded by Jacka, On a Wing and a chair. The charity's mission was to raise the publics' expectations of what people with disabilities can achieve and inspire everyone, with or without a disability, to get out and have a go at their own dreams and goals.

In 2006, Jacka became the world's first quadriplegic to fly a powered hang glider (ultralight trike). In order to fly the aircraft, Jacka together with the fabricator, Geoff Higgins, designed the adaptations needed to suit his disability.

In 2016, Jacka became the first person with quadriplegia to kayak the length of Australia's longest river, the Murray River. The expedition took 89 days, and covered 2,226 km, from Lake Hume (New South Wales) to the river's outlet, near Goolwa on South Australia's coast. Jacka paddled in a modified sea kayak with his hands taped to the paddle.

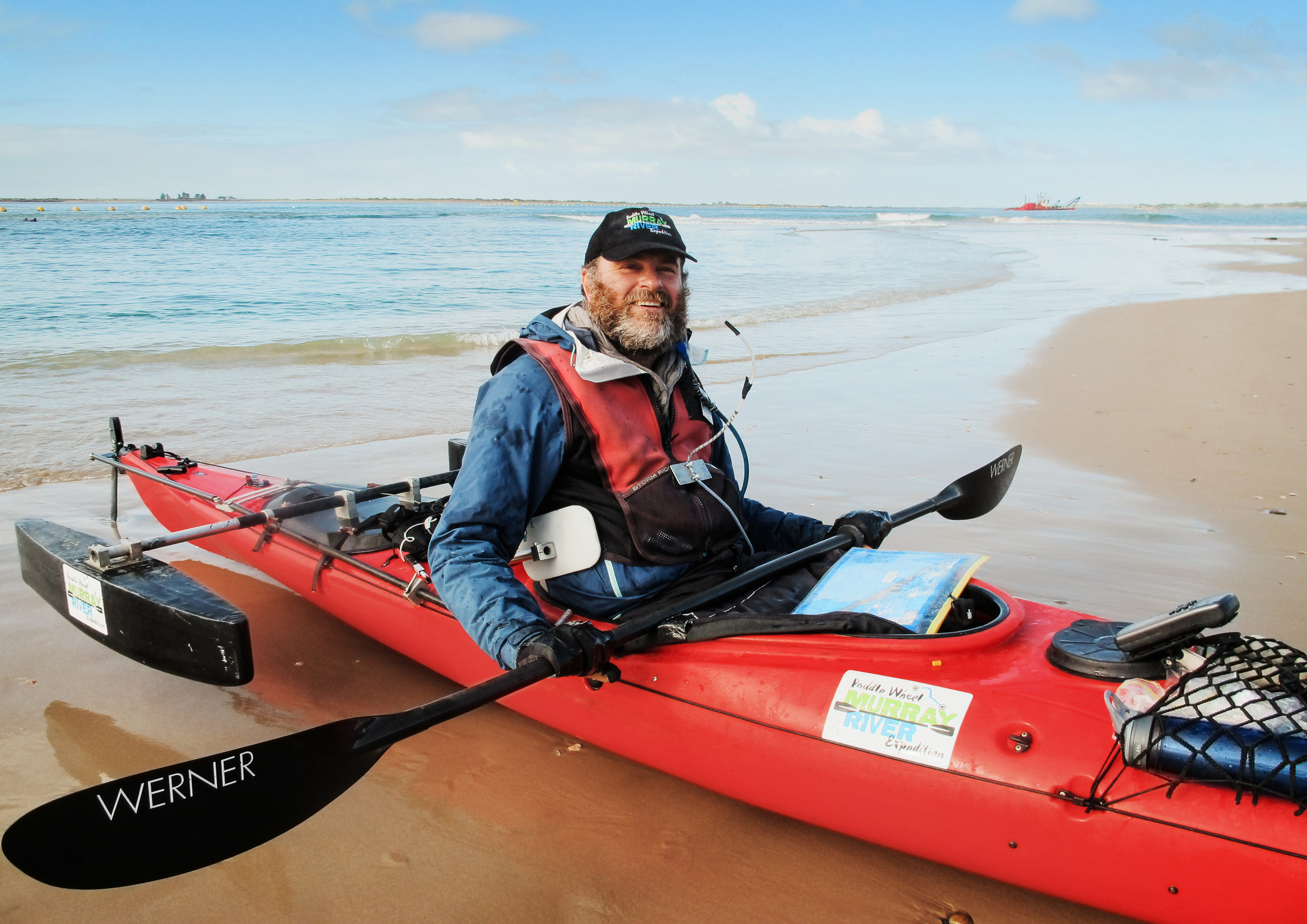
Jacka arrives at the Murray river's outlet, near Goolwa, having completed kayaking the 2,226 km length of the Murray River. 28 May 2016.

Jacka represented Australia as part of the Australia national wheelchair rugby team at the 1996 Summer Paralympics.

Dave Jacka became quadriplegic after a motorbike accident in 1988. With C5/6 complete quadriplegia, he was left with 6% physical function. He has no movement below his armpits, limited arm function, no finger function, and cannot regulate his body temperature.

Jacka was also a founding member of the Physically Challenged Shooters Club, based in Springvale, Victoria.

== Awards ==
Medal (OAM) of the Order of Australia.

Victorian State Finalist for the 2014 Australian of the Year.

For Jacka's solo flight around Australia, he won Victoria's Pride of Australia Medal for Courage in September 2013.

== Personal life ==
Jacka lives in Melbourne, with his wife.

Jacka is a relation of Albert Jacka, the first Australian to be decorated with the Victoria Cross during the First World War.
