= 2018 IWRF World Championship =

Tournament information
- Sport: Wheelchair rugby
- Location: Sydney, Australia
- Administrator: International Wheelchair Rugby Federation

Final positions
- Champion: Japan
- Runner-up: Australia
- 3rd place: United States

Tournament statistics
- Matches played: 42

The 2018 IWRF World Championship was the 7th international championship for wheelchair rugby. It was held in Sydney, Australia at the State Sports Centre and Genea Netball Centre in Sydney Olympic Park from August 5 to August 10. The tournament was won by Japan, their first title.

The naming rights sponsor of the event was GIO. It was organised by Disability Sports Australia and the International Wheelchair Rugby Federation and was the biggest disability sporting event to be held in Sydney since the 2000 Paralympic Games. Matches were streamed.

== Tournament ==
Twelve teams contested the 2018 IWRF World Championship. The preliminary rounds consisted of a group stage where the teams were split into two leagues which were contested as a round-robin. This was then followed by a round of crossover matches that determined the semi-finalists.

=== Preliminary round ===
==== Group A ====
August 5, 2018
14:00

New Zealand	36 - 66	Australia

August 5, 2018
14:30

Ireland (Republic of Ireland)	37 - 57	Japan

August 5, 2018
17:00

Sweden	54 - 57	Denmark

August 6, 2018
10:00

Japan	56 - 37	New Zealand

August 6, 2018
11:00

Denmark	56 - 47	(Republic of Ireland) Ireland

August 6, 2018
12:30

Australia	71- 38	Sweden

August 6, 2018
18:00

Denmark	55 - 54	New Zealand

August 6, 2018
18:30

Ireland (Republic of Ireland)	47 - 52	Sweden

August 7, 2018
13:30

Denmark	49 - 61	Australia

August 7, 2018
15:30

New Zealand	52 - 42	(Republic of Ireland) Ireland

August 7, 2018
16:00

Sweden	46 - 48	Japan

August 8, 2018
10:00

Australia	70 - 44	(Republic of Ireland) Ireland

August 8, 2018
10:00

Japan	52 - 42	Denmark

August 8, 2018
16:00

Sweden	54 - 52	New Zealand

August 8, 2018
18:30

Australia	65 - 52	Japan

Team	Pld	W	D	L	GF	GA	GD
Australia	5	5	0	0	333	219	+114
Japan	5	4	0	1	265	227	+38
Denmark	5	3	0	2	259	269	-9
Sweden	5	2	0	3	244	275	-31
New Zealand	5	1	0	4	231	273	-42
(Republic of Ireland) Ireland	5	0	0	5	217	273	-70

=== Preliminary round ===
==== Group B ====
August 5, 2018
16:30

Canada	42 - 51	France

August 5, 2018
19:00

Colombia	32 - 58	United States

August 5, 2018
19:30

Poland	31 - 55	(United Kingdom) Great Britain

August 6, 2018
13:30

United States	47 - 41	(United Kingdom) Great Britain

August 6, 2018
13:30

Colombia	45 - 50	France

August 6, 2018
16:00

Poland	45 - 43	Canada

August 7, 2018
10:00

Colombia	50 - 43	Poland

August 7, 2018
11:00

Great Britain (United Kingdom)	55 - 43	Canada

August 7, 2018
12:30

France	39 - 54	United States

August 7, 2018
18:00

Great Britain (United Kingdom)	57 - 20	Colombia

August 7, 2018
18:30

France	51 - 39	Poland

August 8, 2018
12:30

United States	47 - 33	Poland

August 8, 2018
12:30

Canada	59 - 46	Colombia

August 8, 2018
16:00

Great Britain (United Kingdom)	47 - 41	France

August 8, 2018
16:00

United States	54 - 47	Canada

Team	Pld	W	D	L	GF	GA	GD
United States	5	5	0	0	260	192	+68
(United Kingdom) Great Britain	5	4	0	1	255	182	+73
France	5	3	0	2	232	227	+5
Canada	5	1	0	4	234	251	-17
Poland	5	1	0	4	191	246	-55
Colombia	5	1	0	4	193	267	-74

=== Classification rounds ===
==== 9th–12th places ====
Classification round
9 August 2018 - 11:00
Colombia	61
New Zealand	59
9 August 2018 - 10:30
Poland	49
Ireland	44

Ninth place
10 August 2018 - 9:30
Poland	44
Colombia	39
Eleventh place
10 August 2018 - 9:30
New Zealand	51
Ireland	40

==== 5th–8th places ====
Classification round
9 August 2018 - 13:30
Canada	52
Denmark	51
9 August 2018 - 13:00
France	54
Sweden	42

Fifth place
10 August 2018 - 11:30
France	52
Canada	51
Seventh place
10 August 2018 - 11:30
Denmark	51
Sweden	48

=== Medals round ===
Semifinals
9 August 2018 - 15:30
Japan	51
United States	46
9 August 2018 - 16:0
Australia	59
Great Britain	57

Gold-medal match
10 August 2018 - 16:00
Japan	62
Australia	61
Bronze-medal match
10 August 2018 - 1:45
United States	47
Great Britain	36

== All-Tournament Team ==
- 0.5 Jonathan Coggan (GBR)
- 1.0 Carlos Neme (COL)
- 1.5 Cedric Nankin (FRA)
- 2.0 Joe Delagrave (USA)
- 2.5 Tomas Hjert (SWE)
- 3.0 Jim Roberts (GBR)
- 3.5 Ryley Batt (AUS)
- MVP Daisuke Ikezaki(JPN)
