= 2022 Wheelchair Rugby World Championship =

International wheelchair rugby competition

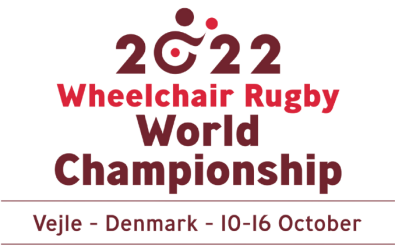

Tournament information
- Sport: Wheelchair rugby
- Location: Vejle, Denmark
- Date: 10–16 October 2022
- Administrator: World Wheelchair Rugby

Final positions
- Champions: Australia
- Runner-up: United States
- 3rd place: Japan

Tournament statistics
- Matches played: 44

The 2022 Wheelchair Rugby World Championship was the 8th international championship for wheelchair rugby. It was held at the DGI-Huset recreational centre in Vejle, Denmark from 10–16 October 2022 and contested by the world's top twelve national teams. The tournament was won by Australia, defeating United States in the final by 58–55 to claim their second title.

== Tournament ==
Twelve teams contested the 2022 Wheelchair Rugby World Championship. The preliminary rounds consisted of a group stage where the teams were split into two leagues which were contested as a round-robin. This was then followed by a round of crossover matches that determined the semi-finalists.

=== Preliminary round ===
==== Pool A ====
Team	Pld	W	D	L	GF	GA	GD	Pts
France	5	5	0	0	282	224	+58	10
United States	5	4	0	1	263	217	+46	8
(United Kingdom) Great Britain	5	3	0	2	279	255	+24	6
New Zealand	5	2	0	3	238	259	-21	4
Germany	5	1	0	4	241	264	-23	2
Switzerland	5	0	0	5	203	287	-84	0

==== Pool B ====
Team	Pld	W	D	L	GF	GA	GD	Pts
Japan	5	5	0	0	285	228	+57	10
Australia	5	4	0	1	271	228	+43	8
Canada	5	3	0	2	279	250	+29	6
Denmark	5	2	0	3	273	263	+10	4
Colombia	5	1	0	4	220	264	-44	2
Brazil	5	0	0	5	195	290	-95	0

=== Classification rounds ===
==== 9th - 12th places ====
Classification round
14 October 2022 - 10:00
Switzerland	44
Colombia	49
14 October 2022 - 12:15
Brazil	42
Germany	53

Ninth place
15 October 2022 - 11:15
Colombia	54
Germany	49
Eleventh place
15 October 2022 - 9:00
Switzerland	44
Brazil	48

==== 5th - 8th places ====
Classification round
15 October 2022 - 10:00
Great Britain	48
France	51
15 October 2022 - 12:15
Canada	60
New Zealand	49

Fifth place
16 October 2022 - 11:30
France	48
Canada	60
Seventh place
16 October 2022 - 9:15
Great Britain	52
New Zealand	49

=== Medals round ===
Quarter-finals
14 October 2022 - 11:00
Australia	54
Great Britain	45
14 October 2022 - 14:45
France	53
Denmark	55
14 October 2022 - 17:00
United States	53
Canada	51
14 October 2022 - 19:15
Japan	58
New Zealand	38

Semi-finals
15 October 2022 - 14:30
Australia	56
Denmark	55
15 October 2022 - 16:45
United States	57
Japan	52

Gold medal match
16 October 2022 - 16:00
Australia	58
United States	55
Bronze medal match
16 October 2022 - 13:45
Denmark	57
Japan	61
