= Wheelchair rugby classification =

Assigns point values to players based on functional mobility

Wheelchair rugby classification is the seven class system that assigns players a point value based on functional mobility to ensure parity in athletic ability on the court at any given time. Classification is handled by the International Wheelchair Rugby Federation.

== Definition ==
In wheelchair rugby, players are assessed into seven classes: 0.5, 1.0, 1.5, 2.0, 2.5, 3.0, and 3.5 points. The lower level points indicate less functional ability and the higher points indicate greater functional ability. Men and women both play the sport, and they play on the same team. There are no separate events for men and women.

Only four players are on the court at any given time. The total points on the floor for a team cannot exceed 8, but this maximum is increased by 0.5 points for every female on the court. This is done in order to insure parity in athletic ability on the court at any given time.

Functional mobility range of a .5 point player

Functional mobility range of a 1-point player

Functional mobility range of a 2-point player

Functional mobility range of a 3-point player

== Governance ==
Classification is handled by the International Wheelchair Rugby Federation, and is outlined in their 2008 publication called International Wheelchair Rugby Federation Classification Manual. In 2009, the classification was handled by the IWAS.

== Eligibility ==
As of 2012, people with physical disabilities are eligible to compete in this sport. Lower leg amputation competitors are allowed to participate in wheelchair sport following classification rules for them based on functional mobility.

== History ==
The sport was created in 1977 in Canada, and was designed as an alternative to wheelchair basketball. In 1992, the International Paralympic Committee formally took control of governance for disability sport. Wheelchair rugby had been governed by IWAS since 1992, close to the sport's inception. IWAS had also managed the classification side of the sport. In 2010, the International Wheelchair Rugby Federation formally separated from IWAS and took over management of classification of their sport themselves.

== Process ==
Wheelchair rugby classification includes looking at practiced activities, and may include observing their warm up routine, the ability during throwing drills, their ability to catch a ball and their ability to maneuver their wheelchair. Classification may also include a test where competitors are asked to bench press in order to demonstrate their upper arm strength and how much upper arm mobility they possess.

In most countries, classification for national competitions is done through the local national Paralympic committee. For Australian competitors in this sport, the sport and classification is managed by the Australian Paralympic Committee. There are three types of classification available for Australian competitors: Provisional, national and international. The first is for club level competitions, the second for state and national competitions, and the third for international competitions.

== At the Paralympic Games ==
At the 1992 Summer Paralympics, wheelchair disability types were eligible to participate, with classification being run through ISMWSF, with classification being done based on functional disability type. There were 4 classification appeals lodged for wheelchair rugby at the 2000 Summer Paralympics involving 3 athletes which resulted in 1 class change. Wheelchair rugby competition at the London 2012 Summer Paralympics was held at the Basketball Arena, Olympic Park from the 5 September to 9 September. One team of twelve athletes (men and women) per country was allowed.

For the 2016 Summer Paralympics in Rio, the International Paralympic Committee had a zero classification at the Games policy. This policy was put into place in 2014, with the goal of avoiding last minute changes in classes that would negatively impact athlete training preparations. Wheelchair rugby competitors were an exception to this rule in that players under Review status for their classification would be eligible to compete in Rio. In case there was a need for classification or reclassification at the Games despite best efforts otherwise, wheelchair rugby classification was scheduled for September 11 to 12 at Athletes Park. For sportspeople with physical or intellectual disabilities going through classification or reclassification in Rio, their in competition observation event is their first appearance in competition at the Games.

== Future ==
Going forward, disability sport's major classification body, the International Paralympic Committee, is working on improving classification to be more of an evidence-based system as opposed to a performance-based system so as not to punish elite athletes whose performance makes them appear in a higher class alongside competitors who train less.
