= Wheelchair rugby at the 2008 Summer Paralympics – Rosters =

Eight teams participated in wheelchair rugby at the 2008 Summer Paralympics in Beijing, China. Teams could have up to 12 players, but no more than 11 of the team members could be male. In wheelchair rugby, each player is given a sport class based on their upper body function. The classification is a 7-level score ranging from 0.5 to 3.5, with lower scores corresponding to more severe disability. The sum score of all a team's players on the field could not exceed 8.

== Australia ==
Team staff
Coach	Brad Dubberley
Assistant coach	Robert Doidge

No.	Name	Sport class	Age
8	Bryce Alman	2.0	32
3	Ryley Batt	3.5	19
7	Grant Boxall	2.5	32
5	Shane Brand	1.5	35
4	Cameron Carr	2.0	31
2	Nazim Erdem	0.5	38
1	George Hucks	3.0	40
12	Steve Porter (captain)	2.5	38
11	Ryan Scott	0.5	26
13	Greg Smith	2.0	41
6	Scott Vitale	2.0	23

== Canada ==
Team staff
Coach	Benoit Labrecque
Assistant coach	Marco Dispaltro
Assistant coach	Adam Frost

No.	Name	Sport class	Age
6	Ian Chan	3.0	31
2	Jason Crone	1.5	21
13	Jared Funk	0.5	34
5	Garett Hickling	3.5	37
10	Trevor Hirschfield	1.0	24
11	Fabien Lavoie	3.0	27
9	Say Luangkhamdeng	2.0	31
1	Daniel Paradis	0.5	47
4	Erika Schmutz	1.5	35
15	Patrice Simard	1.5	29
8	Mike Whitehead	3.0	32
14	David Willsie (captain)	2.0	40

== China ==
Team staff
Coach	Wen Yan
Assistant coach	Wu Zhiming

No.	Name	Sport class	Age
3	Chen Jun	2.5	23
8	Cheng Shuangmiao (captain)	2.0	28
7	Cui Maosheng	2.0	32
2	Han Guifei	3.0	21
1	Pan Zilin	3.5	35
12	Shao Dequan	1.0	20
10	Tao Zhenfeng	0.5	32
6	Tian Shilin	2.0	24
5	Wang Sheng	3.0	35
11	Xia Junfeng	0.5	36
9	Yu Zhongtao	1.0	25
15	Zhang Wenli	1.5	40

== Germany ==
Team staff
Coach	Pierre Sahm
Assistant coach	Bert Metzger

No.	Name	Sport class	Age
15	Maik Baumann	3.0	28
3	Christian Goetze	1.0	33
14	Joerg Holzem (captain)	2.5	35
10	Salih Koeseoglu	2.5	28
4	Wolfgang Mayer	2.5	43
13	Nacer Menezla	2.0	33
8	Oliver Johannes Picht	3.0	36
11	Micael Reis	2.5	30
12	Wolfgang Schmitt	0.5	25
7	Dirk Wieschendorf	1.0	33
1	Christoph Werner	2.0	39

== Great Britain ==
Team staff
Coach	Mark Edward O'Connor

No.	Name	Sport class	Age
11	Alan Ash	2.0	35
10	Andrew Barrow	2.0	29
2	Jonathan Coggan	0.5	25
8	Troye Collins	2.5	36
9	Justin Frishberg	2.0	36
5	Bulbul Hussain	1.0	36
6	Ross Morrison	2.5	29
3	Steven Palmer	1.5	35
12	Josie Pearson	1.5	22
7	Jason Roberts	1.5	35
1	Mandip Sehmi	2.5	27
4	Paul Shaw	1.0	37

== Japan ==
Team staff
Coach	Yasuo Shiozawa
Assistant coach	Daisuke Aoyagi

No.	Name	Sport class	Age
7	Shingo Fujishima	3.0	36
12	Shunsuke Kawano	1.5	32
8	Hiroyuki Misaka	2.0	27
6	Takuo Murohashi	2.0	33
3	Yu Nagayasu	3.0	22
11	Shin Nakazato	2.5	31
5	Koichi Ogino (captain)	1.0	42
10	Yoshito Sato	2.0	28
4	Shinichi Shimakawa	3.0	33
1	Yoshinobu Takahashi	0.5	33
9	Manabu Tamura	2.5	33

== New Zealand ==
Team staff
Coach	Grant Sharman
Assistant coach	Tim Johnson

No.	Name	Sport class	Age
13	Daniel Buckingham (captain)	3.0	27
7	Tim Johnson	2.0	32
11	David Klinkhamer	1.5	26
2	Curtis Palmer	2.5	31
4	Sholto Taylor	2.0	36
6	Geremy Tinker	2.0	35
5	Jai Waite	1.0	32
14	Adam Wakeford	1.0	30

== United States ==
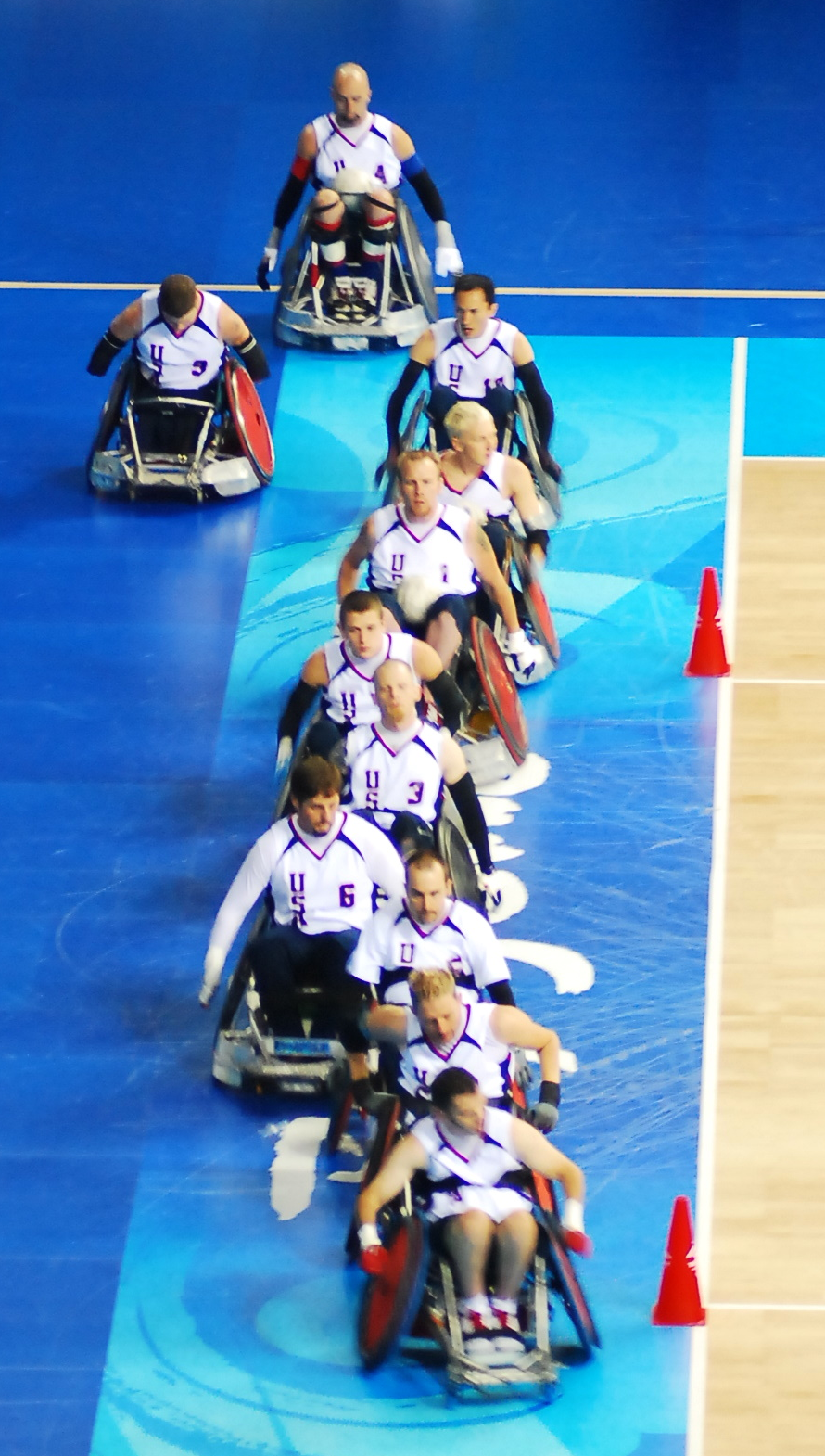
The United States national wheelchair rugby team.

Team staff
Coach	James Gumbert
Assistant coach	Edward Suhr

No.	Name	Sport class	Age
11	Andy Cohn	2.0	30
10	Will Groulx	2.0	34
8	Scott Hogsett	1.0	35
4	Bryan Kirkland (captain)	2.0	37
5	Norm Lyduch	1.0	36
2	Seth McBride	2.0	25
7	Jason Regier	0.5	33
9	Nick Springer	2.0	23
1	Chance Sumner	3.0	31
6	Joel Wilmoth	3.5	19
3	Mark Zupan	3.0	33
