= 2013 IWRF European Championship =

- Location: Antwerp, Belgium
- Dates: 10 - 17 August
- Nations: 12

Medalists
gold medal	Sweden
silver medal	Denmark
bronze medal	(United Kingdom) Great Britain

2013 IWRF European Championship was the 9th international European wheelchair rugby competition, taken place between 10 August - 17 August. The championships was contested between Europe's twelve top national teams and was held at the Pajulahti Sports Institute in Antwerp, Belgium. The tournament was won by Sweden, their fourth title.

The finalists of the competition, Denmark and Sweden, won the two European qualification slots for the wheelchair rugby tournament at the 2014 IWRF World Championships.

== Tournament ==
Twelve teams contested the 2013 IWRF European Championship. The preliminary rounds consisted of a group stage where the teams were split into two leagues which were contested as a round-robin. The winner of group A then faced the second placed team from Group B and the winner of group B faced the second placed team from group A in elimination matches to determine the two finalists. The eventual winners, Great Britain, finished the competition unbeaten.

=== Preliminary round ===
==== Group A ====
Team	Pld	W	D	L	GF	GA	GD	Pts
(United Kingdom) Great Britain	5	3	0	0	0	0	0	0
Germany	5	0	0	0	0	0	0	0
Czech Republic	5	0	0	0	0	0	0	0
Belgium	5	0	0	3	126	165	-39	0
Austria	5	0	0	0	0	0	0	0
Finland	5	0	0	3	126	165	-39	0

===== Day 1 =====
12 August 2013
20:00

Austria (Australia)	40 – 61	Belgium

===== Day 2 =====
13 August 2013
11:30

Great Britain (United Kingdom)	59 – 39	(Australia) Austria

13 August 2013
12:00

Germany	50 – 43	Czech Republic

13 August 2013
13:30

Finland	45 – 46	Belgium

13 August 2013
18:00

Great Britain (United Kingdom)	64 – 33	Czech Republic

13 August 2013
19:30

Germany	45 – 41	Finland

==== Group B ====
Team	Pld	W	D	L	GF	GA	GD	Pts
Denmark	3	3	0	0	185	129	+56	9
Sweden	3	2	0	1	168	154	+14	6
France	3	1	0	2	149	181	-32	3
Italy	3	0	0	3	153	191	-38	0
Poland	3	0	0	3	153	191	-38	0
Switzerland	3	0	0	3	153	191	-38	0

===== Day 2 =====
13 August 2013
9:30

Sweden	47 – 48	Denmark

13 August 2013
10:00

Italy	44 – 49	Poland

13 August 2013
15:30

France	53 – 59	Denmark

13 August 2013
16:00

Italy	40 – 63	Sweden

13 August 2013
17:30

Switzerland	39 – 38 (ot)	Poland

===== Day 3 =====
14 August 2013
9:30

Sweden	36 – 33	Poland

14 August 2013
10:00

Denmark	51 – 37	Switzerland

17 September 2015
14:00

Ireland (Republic of Ireland)	44 – 67	Denmark

Pajulahti Sports Institute
17 September 2015
16:00

Finland	50 – 58	Germany

=== Classification ===
Bracket

Classification round
18 September 2015 - 12:00
France	58
Finland	38
18 September 2015 - 14:00
Ireland	57
Belgium	56

Fifth place
19 September 2015 - 12:00
France	63
Ireland	54
Seventh place
19 September 2015 - 10:00
Finland	50
Belgium	46

=== Medal round ===
Bracket

Semifinals
18 September 2015 - 16:00
(United Kingdom) Great Britain	53
Germany	50
18 September 2015 - 18:00
Denmark	57
Sweden	58

Gold medal match
19 September 2015 - 16:00
(United Kingdom) Great Britain	49
Sweden	48
Bronze medal match
19 September 2015 - 14:00
Denmark	56
Germany	48
