= Mandip Sehmi =

- Born: Mandip Singh Sehmi; 13 December 1980 (age 45) Royal Leamington Spa, Warwickshire, England
- Occupation: Wheel Chair Rugby Athlete

Rugby union career
- Position: -
International career
Years	Team	Apps	(Points)
- Great Britain

Mandip Sehmi (born 13 December 1980) is a British wheelchair rugby player.

He was part of the Great Britain national wheelchair rugby team that came in 4th place at the 2008 Summer Paralympics in Beijing, China.

He has three gold medals from the IWRF European Championship (2005, 2007 and 2015).

Sehmi was involved in a car crash in the summer of 2000, which resulted in a broken neck and a permanent spinal cord injury. He spent a year recovering at the Stoke Mandeville hospital.

While at the hospital, he had the opportunity to meet Bob O'Shea, a member of the Great Britain national wheelchair rugby team. O'Shea's wife was a nurse at the hospital, and he invited Sehmi to train in wheelchair rugby at a location near the hospital.
