= David Anthony (wheelchair rugby) =

British Paralympic rugby player

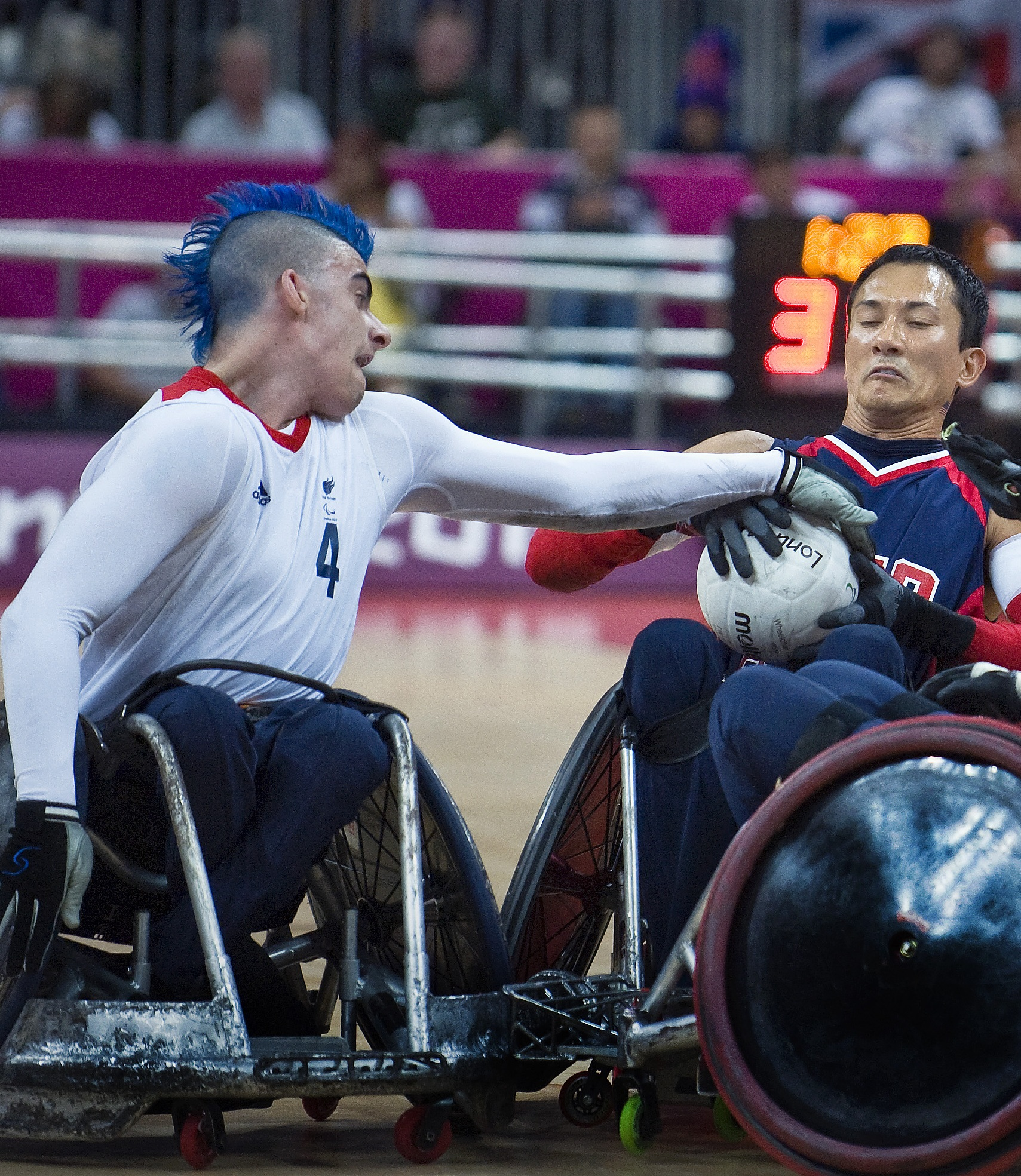
- Anthony (left) challenges William Groulx during the 2012 Summer Paralympics

Personal information
- Full name: David Anthony
- Nationality: British
- Born: 18 December 1989 (age 36) Neath, Wales

Sport
- Sport: Wheelchair rugby
- Club: Cardiff Pirates
- Team: (United Kingdom) Great Britain

Achievements and titles
- Paralympic finals: London 2012

David Anthony (born 18 December 1989) is a British wheelchair rugby athlete and member of the Great Britain national wheelchair rugby team. He represented Great Britain at the 2012 Summer Paralympics in London.

== Sporting history ==
Anthony was born in Neath, Wales. He has muscular dystrophy and as of 2012 has undergone 11 spinal operations. He took to sport from an early age, and from 2002 he was a member of a local disabled multi-sport club. In 2006 the Cardiff Pirates wheelchair rugby team visited his sports club, and after showing an interest Anthony was invited to train with the team.

Anthony began playing for the Pirates in 2006 and by 2008 he was selected for the Great Britain national wheelchair rugby team. Anthony was part of the 2008 team which played in the Maximus Tournament in Brazil, winning the gold medal after beating the US in the final. He was also selected for the Great Britain team at the 2009 European Championships in Hillerod, Denmark; where the team narrowly lost to Germany for the bronze medal place, and the 2010 World Championships in Vancouver, Canada. Although the team failed to reach the top three in either competitions, in 2011 Anthony was part of the Great Britain team which achieved silver at the 2011 European Championships in Notwill, Switzerland.

In 2012, Anthony was selected as part of the Great Britain team to play in the 2012 Summer Paralympics in London. In the first group game at the Paralympics, Great Britain faced the United States but lost 56–44. Anthony scored 11 goals in the match, the second highest scorer for Great Britain behind team-mate Aaron Phipps. The next day Britain faced France, winning the game 57–50 keeping their group qualification alive. Anthony was brought into the game in the third period, scoring seven goals. The final group game for Britain was against Japan on 7 September. Anthony started the game and contributed with nine goals, but this was not enough to give Britain the match, which saw them lose 39–51 and ended their Paralympic title bid. Although out of medal contention, Great Britain finished the tournament in 5th place after beating both Belgium and Sweden in the Classification rounds. Anthony played in both matches, starting and scoring 12 goals in the game against Belgium and adding another 3 goals in the contest with Sweden, after coming on in the third period.

Anthony became a fan favourite during the 2012 Paralympics, not only from his match play, but also for his aggressive on-court posturing and stand-out blue mohican hairstyle.
