= Adam Frost =

Adam Frost may refer to:

- Adam Frost (writer)
- Adam Frost (garden designer)
- Adam Frost, character in the TV series The Leftovers
- Adam Frost (wheelchair rugby), Wheelchair rugby at the 2008 Summer Paralympics – Rosters
- Adam Frost, actor in The Sausage Factory
