= 2015 IWRF European Championship =

10th international European wheelchair rugby competition

- Venue: Pajulahti Sports Institute
- Location: Nastola, Finland
- Dates: 15 - 19 September
- Nations: 8

Medalists
gold medal	(United Kingdom) Great Britain
silver medal	Sweden
bronze medal	Denmark

2015 IWRF European Championship was the 10th international European wheelchair rugby competition, taken place between 15 September to 19 September. The championships was contested between Europe's eight top national teams and was held at the Pajulahti Sports Institute in Nastola, Finland. The tournament was won by Great Britain, their fifth title.

The finalists of the competition, Great Britain and Sweden, won the two European qualification slots for the wheelchair rugby tournament at the 2016 Summer Paralympics in Rio.

== Tournament ==
Eight teams contested the 2015 IWRF European Championship. The preliminary rounds consisted of a group stage where the teams were split into two leagues which were contested as a round-robin. The winner of group A then faced the second placed team from Group B and the winner of group B faced the second placed team from group A in elimination matches to determine the two finalists. The eventual winners, Great Britain, finished the competition unbeaten.

=== Preliminary round ===
==== Group A ====
Team	Pld	W	D	L	GF	GA	GD	Pts
(United Kingdom) Great Britain	3	3	0	0	173	132	+41	9
Sweden	3	2	0	1	158	159	-1	6
France	3	1	0	2	154	155	-1	3
Belgium	3	0	0	3	126	165	-39	0

16 September 2015
10:00

France	54 – 45	Belgium

Pajulahti Sports Institute
16 September 2015
16:00

Great Britain (United Kingdom)	53 – 52	France

Pajulahti Sports Institute
16 September 2015
18:00

Sweden	54 – 48	Belgium

Pajulahti Sports Institute
17 September 2015
10:00

France	48 – 57	Sweden

Pajulahti Sports Institute
17 September 2015
12:00

Great Britain (United Kingdom)	57 – 33	Belgium

Pajulahti Sports Institute
17 September 2015
18:00

Great Britain (United Kingdom)	63 – 47	Sweden

Pajulahti Sports Institute

==== Group B ====
Team	Pld	W	D	L	GF	GA	GD	Pts
Denmark	3	3	0	0	185	129	+56	9
Germany	3	2	0	1	168	154	+14	6
Finland	3	1	0	2	149	181	-32	3
(Republic of Ireland) Ireland	3	0	0	3	153	191	-38	0

15 September 2015
16:00

Germany	48 – 56	Denmark

Pajulahti Sports Institute
15 September 2015
18:30

Ireland (Republic of Ireland)	61 – 62	Finland

Pajulahti Sports Institute
16 September 2015
12:00

Germany	62 – 48	Ireland

Pajulahti Sports Institute
16 September 2015
14:00

Finland	37 – 62	Denmark

Pajulahti Sports Institute
17 September 2015
14:00

Ireland (Republic of Ireland)	44 – 67	Denmark

Pajulahti Sports Institute
17 September 2015
16:00

Finland	50 – 58	Germany

Pajulahti Sports Institute

=== Classification ===
Bracket

Classification round
18 September 2015 - 12:00
France	58
Finland	38
18 September 2015 - 14:00
Ireland	57
Belgium	56

Fifth place
19 September 2015 - 12:00
France	63
Ireland	54
Seventh place
19 September 2015 - 10:00
Finland	50
Belgium	46

=== Medal round ===
Bracket

Semifinals
18 September 2015 - 16:00
(United Kingdom) Great Britain	53
Germany	50
18 September 2015 - 18:00
Denmark	57
Sweden	58

Gold medal match
19 September 2015 - 16:00
(United Kingdom) Great Britain	49
Sweden	48
Bronze medal match
19 September 2015 - 14:00
Denmark	56
Germany	48
