= Mount St Joseph School =

Coordinates: 53.555°N 2.423°W

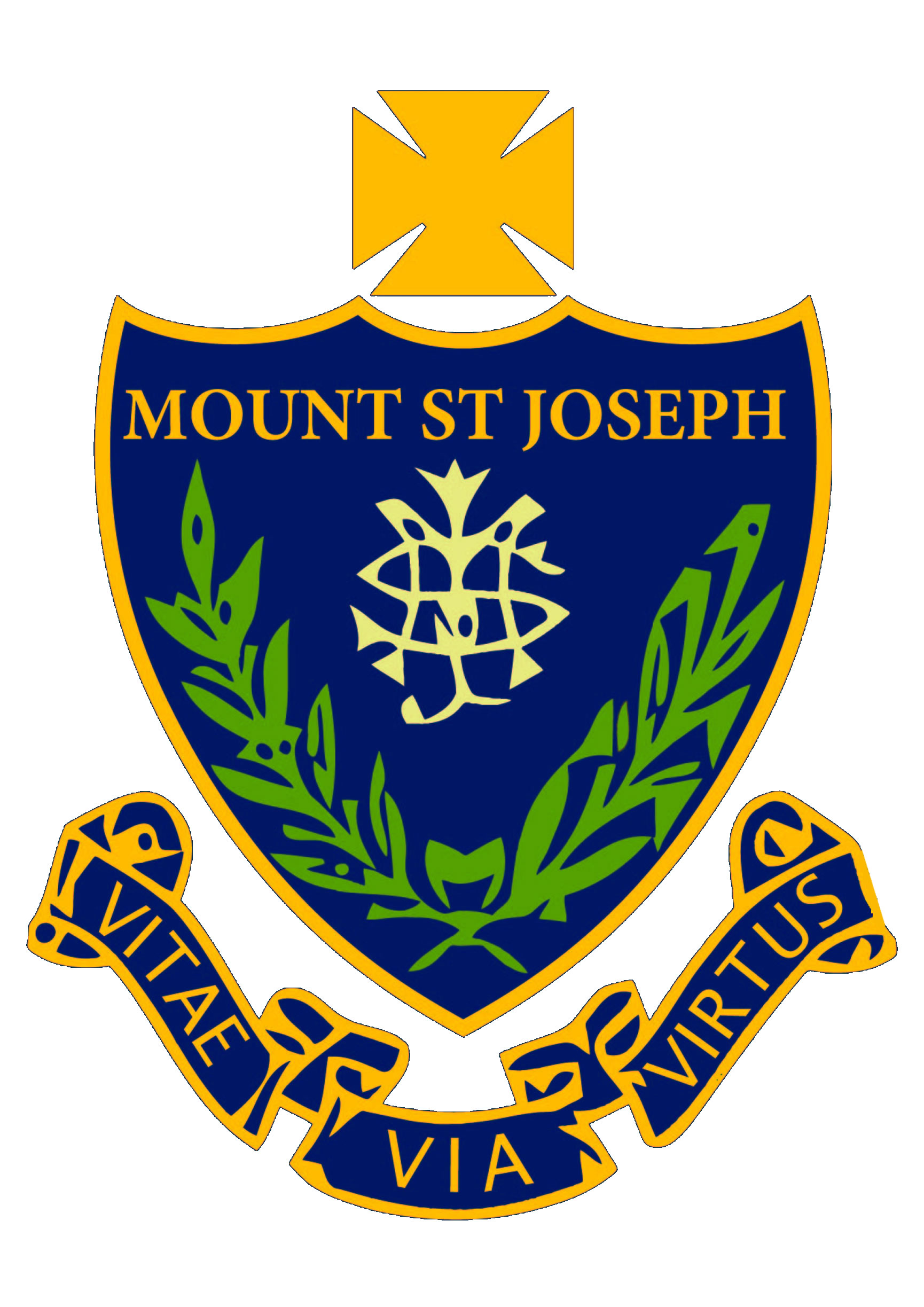

Location
- Greenland Road; Farnworth; Greater Manchester, BL4 0HU; England

Information
- Type: Voluntary aided school
- Motto: "A community of Learners, Believers and Friends"
- Religious affiliation: Roman Catholic
- Established: 25 August 1902
- Founders: Sisters of the Cross and Passion
- School district: Bolton
- Local authority: Bolton Council
- Department for Education URN: 105263 Tables
- Ofsted: Reports
- Headteacher: Alexandra Devany
- Gender: Coeducational
- Age: 11 to 16
- Enrolment: 904 as of December 2022
- Website: http://www.msj.bolton.sch.uk

Mount St Joseph School is a coeducational Roman Catholic secondary school located in Farnworth, Greater Manchester, England. As of December 2023, the school is rated "Requires Improvement".

== History ==
Mount St Joseph School was established in 1902 by the Sisters of the Cross and Passion.

=== Direct grant grammar school ===
After World War II it became a girls' direct grant grammar school.

=== Comprehensive ===
It was converted to a comprehensive school in 1979. The school was awarded Business and Enterprise College status in the early 2000s and was renamed Mount St Joseph Business & Enterprise College for a time.

The school's centenary was celebrated in 2002 with the design of a stained glass window in the chapel in the central area of the school. This was designed by a former pupil and incorporates the religious background of the school in its Roman Catholic Heritage.

== Admissions ==
Today Mount St Joseph is a voluntary aided school administered by Bolton Metropolitan Borough Council and the Roman Catholic Diocese of Salford. The school offers GCSEs, BTECs and NVQs as programmes of study for pupils.

As of the academic year of 2011-2012 the school has used a house system, consisting of Nelson Mandela House, William Shakespeare House and Edward Jenner House. The most successful house as of May 2016 is Shakespeare House with two consecutive house competition wins over the running period. The competitions are based upon many factors from punctuality of the students to checking of equipment.

The school offers a wide range of curriculum in a wide range of subjects such as: GCSE Mathematics, GCSE English Language, GCSE English Literature, GCSE Core Science, GCSE Additional Science, GCSE Biology, GCSE Chemistry, GCSE Physics, GCSE Geography, GCSE History, GCSE Religious Studies, GCSE Graphic Design, GCSE Computer Science, GCSE French, GCSE Spanish, GCSE Physical Education, GCSE Art, GCSE Photography, GCSE Catering, BTEC IT, BTEC Business Studies, BTEC Health and Social Care and Level 2 Certificate in Further Mathematics.

The school's Latin motto "Vitae Via Virtus" translates and means "Virtue is the way of Life".

== Notable former pupils ==
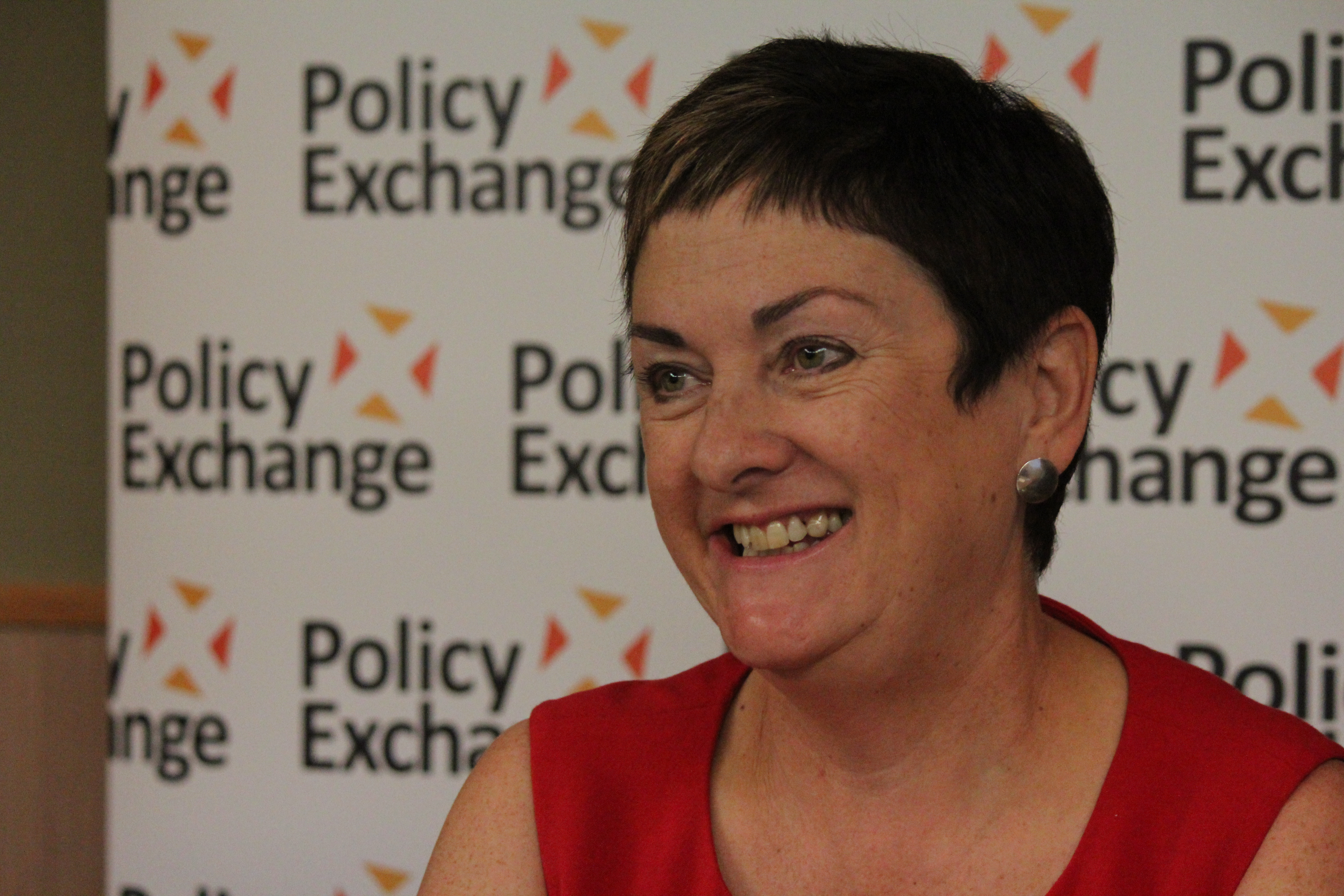
Teachers' trade union leader, Mary Bousted

- Peter Kay, BAFTA Winning actor, comedian, director and writer
- Jason Kenny, World and Olympic Champion track cyclist
- Ruth Madeley, actress
- Paddy McGuinness, comedian, actor, television personality/presenter
- Ayaz Bhuta, GB wheelchair rugby para-Olympian

=== Direct-grant grammar school ===
- Mary Bousted (née Bleasdale), General Secretary from 2003 to 2017 of the Association of Teachers and Lecturers (ATL) Presently (from 2017) Joint General Secretary of the National Education Union (NEU).
