= 2017 IWRF European Championship =

- Venue: Conlog Arena
- Location: Koblenz, Germany
- Dates: 27 June - 1 July
- Nations: 8

Medalists
gold medal	(United Kingdom) Great Britain
silver medal	Sweden
bronze medal	France

2017 IWRF European Championship was the 11th international European wheelchair rugby competition, taken place between 27 June to 1 July. The championships was contested between Europe's eight top national teams and was held at the Conlog Arena in Koblenz, Germany. The tournament was won by Great Britain, their sixth title.

The four top placed teams of the competition, Great Britain, Sweden, France and Denmark were awarded four European qualification slots for the 2018 IWRF World Championship wheelchair rugby tournament.

== Tournament ==
Eight teams contested the 2017 IWRF European Championship. The preliminary rounds consisted of a group stage where the teams were split into two leagues which were contested as a round-robin. The winner of group A then faced the second placed team from Group B and the winner of group B faced the second placed team from group A in elimination matches to determine the two finalists. The eventual winners, Great Britain, finished the competition unbeaten.

=== Preliminary round ===
==== Group A ====
Team	Pld	W	D	L	GF	GA	GD	Pts
Sweden	3	3	0	0	165	136	+29	9
France	3	2	0	1	158	131	+27	6
Germany	3	1	0	2	148	151	-3	3
Finland	3	0	0	3	114	167	-53	0

27 June 2017
11:00

Sweden	48 – 47	France

Conlog Arena
27 June 2017
18:00

Germany	53 – 52	Finland

Conlog Arena
28 June 2017
13:00

France	52 – 36	Finland

Conlog Arena
28 June 2017
17:00

Germany	48 – 55	Sweden

Conlog Arena
29 June 2017
13:00

Sweden	62 – 41	Finland

Conlog Arena
29 June 2017
17:00

Germany	47 – 59	France

Conlog Arena

==== Group B ====
Team	Pld	W	D	L	GF	GA	GD	Pts
(United Kingdom) Great Britain	3	3	0	0	182	108	+74	9
Denmark	3	2	0	1	158	140	+18	6
Poland	3	1	0	2	120	151	-31	3
(Republic of Ireland) Ireland	3	0	0	3	111	172	-61	0

27 June 2017
13:00

Ireland (Republic of Ireland)	42 – 57	Denmark

Conlog Arena
27 June 2017
15:00

Great Britain (United Kingdom)	57 – 32	Poland

Conlog Arena
28 June 2017
11:00

Great Britain (United Kingdom)	65 – 27	Ireland

Conlog Arena
28 June 2017
15:00

Poland	38 – 52	Denmark

Conlog Arena
29 June 2017
11:00

Ireland (Republic of Ireland)	42 – 50	Poland

Conlog Arena
29 June 2017
15:00

Denmark	47 – 60	Great Britain

Conlog Arena

=== Classification ===
Bracket

Classification round
30 June 2017 - 11:00
Germany	58
Ireland	38
30 June 2017 - 13:00
Finland	33
Poland	55

Fifth place
1 July 2017 - 11:45
Poland	46
Germany	39
Seventh place
1 July 2017 - 09:45
Ireland	50
Finland	46

=== Medal round ===
Bracket

Semifinals
30 June 2017 - 15:00
(United Kingdom) Great Britain	54
France	41
30 June 2017 - 17:00
Denmark	56
Sweden	57

Gold-medal match
1 July 2017 - 16:00
(United Kingdom) Great Britain	49
Sweden	41
Bronze-medal match
1 July 2017 - 13:45
France	53
Denmark	48
