= Sweden national wheelchair rugby team =

Sweden SWE
- IWRF Ranking: 6
- IWRF Zone: IWRF European
- National Federation: Swedish Parasports Federation
- Coach: Benoit Labrecque

Paralympic Games
- Appearances: 2
- Medals: –

World Championships
- Appearances: 6
- Medals: –

IWRF European Championship
- Appearances: 11
- Medals: (gold) Gold: 1997, 1999, 2011, 2013; (silver) Silver: 1995, 2009, 2015, 2017; (bronze) Bronze: 2005, 2007

The Sweden national wheelchair rugby team represents Sweden in international wheelchair rugby. Sweden is the second most successful team in European competition, winning four gold medals at the European Championship. They have reached three Summer Paralympics, with their best finish being 5th in the 2000 Games in Sydney.

== Competitive record ==
=== Paralympic Games ===
Sweden have appeared in two Summer Paralympics, 2000 in Sydney and 2012 in London. They have qualified for the 2016 Summer Paralympics in Rio when they secured second place at the 2015 IWRF European Championship.

The 2000 Paralympics in Sydney were the inaugural Games for wheelchair rugby after the sport was included as a demonstration event four years earlier. Sweden were one of eight teams competing for medals and were placed in group A, along with Switzerland and eventual gold and silver medalists the United States and Australia. Sweden lost to both the States and Australia, but a good 44 - 35 win over the Swiss, saw them finish the preliminaries in third place. Although out of medal contention, Sweden beat both Germany and Great Britain to finish in fifth place, the highest placed European team and Sweden's best Paralympic placing to date.

Sweden failed to qualify for both the 2004 and 2008 Games, but after winning the 2011 European Championship in Nottwil they qualified for the 2012 Summer Paralympics in London. The team were placed in group B, with Belgium and in a repeat of their 2000 tournament they were grouped with the eventual gold and silver medalists, this time Australia and Canada. They began the campaign with a convincing 52-42 win over Belgium but this was followed by defeat to Australia and a one point loss to the Canadians. By finishing third Sweden were again unable to play for the medals. In the positional playoffs they started strongly by beating France 58–48, but in their final match they were convincingly beaten by the host nation, Great Britain, to finish in sixth place.

Paralympic Games results
Year	Position	Pld	W	L
(Australia) 2000	5th	5	3	2
(United Kingdom) 2012	6th	5	2	3
Total		10	5	5

=== IWRF World championship ===
Year	Position	Pld	W	L
(Switzerland) 1995	6th			
(Canada) 1998	4th			
(Sweden) 2002	7th			
(New Zealand) 2006	9th			
(Canada) 2010	4th			
(Denmark) 2014	7th	7	3	4
Total				
