= Ayaz Bhuta =

British wheelchair rugby player

Ayaz Bhuta MBE
- Born: 17 April 1989 (age 37) Bolton, UK

Rugby union career
Senior career
Years	Team	Apps	(Points)
–	West Coast Crash		
Coaching career
- Years: Team
- –: West Coast Crash
Medal record
Men's wheelchair rugby
Representing Great Britain
Paralympic Games
Gold medal – first place	2020 Tokyo	Team competition

Ayaz Mazeed Bhuta MBE (born 17 April 1989) is a British Paralympic wheelchair rugby player and a former wheelchair basketball player who currently plays for the Great Britain national wheelchair rugby team. He has represented Great Britain at the Paralympics in 2016 and 2020.

== Biography ==
Ayaz was born with a rare genetic disorder called Roberts Syndrome which affects the growth of bones in arms and legs. He studied at Mount St Joseph School.

== Career ==
He initially played wheelchair basketball but later switched to wheelchair rugby in 2009. He began playing club rugby in 2009 and was subsequently selected to the national team in 2010 for a tri-nation series in Australia. However, after playing in the tri nation tournament in Australia he was axed from the team due to his size. He later worked on his fitness levels and was picked for GBWR Development Squad in 2011. He made his comeback return to the Great Britain team after the end of the 2012 Summer Paralympics.

He made his Paralympic debut representing Great Britain at the 2016 Summer Paralympics and was part of the national wheelchair team which finished at fifth position in the team competition. He was also a key member of the team which won the European Wheelchair Championships in 2015 and 2017.

He won a gold medal with the Great Britain team at the 2020 Summer Paralympics the first time the country had won a medal of any colour in the sport at the Paralympic Games.

Bhuta was appointed Member of the Order of the British Empire (MBE) in the 2022 New Year Honours for services to wheelchair rugby.
