= Justin Frishberg =

British wheelchair rugby player

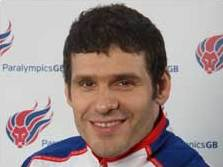
- Frishberg in 2010
- Full name: Justin Leo Thomas Frishberg
- Born: 17 March 1972 (age 54) Oxford

Rugby union career
International career
Years	Team	Apps	(Points)
–	Great Britain		

Justin Leo Thomas Frishberg (born 17 March 1972) is a male former British wheelchair rugby player.

== Personal life ==
Frishberg was educated at Abingdon School from 1985 until 1990 where he was a keen rugby and tennis player. He then studied at Balliol College, Oxford.

== Wheelchair rugby career ==
Frishberg was part of the Great Britain team at the 2004 Paralympics in Athens, and at the 2008 Paralympics in Beijing. The team came in fourth place both times just failing to secure a bronze medal on both occasions after losing out to the United States and Canada respectively.

He was appointed Assistant Coach to the British wheelchair rugby team in 2013, a position he held until the start of 2017.

== See also ==
- List of Old Abingdonians
