= Bulbul Hussain =

Personal information
- Native name: বুল্বুল হুসেইন
- Nickname: Bully
- Nationality: British
- Born: 3 January 1972 (age 54) Sylhet District, Sylhet Division, Bangladesh

Sport
- Country: England
- Sport: Wheelchair rugby
- Club: Kent Crusaders
- Team: (United Kingdom) Great Britain

Achievements and titles
- Paralympic finals: 2008, 2012, 2016
- Updated on 2 October 2012

Bulbul Hussain (Bengali: বুল্বুল হুসেইন; born 3 January 1972) is a British wheelchair rugby player who plays for Kent Crusaders and the Great Britain Paralympic team. He plays mostly in a defensive role.

== Early life ==
Hussain was born in Sylhet District, Sylhet Division, Bangladesh. In 1994, a road traffic accident in Bangladesh left him with a spinal cord injury. He has no function in his hands, some restriction to his arm movement and no movement in his lower body. For wheelchair rugby Hussain is classified as a "one pointer" or a 1.0 player.

== Career ==
In 1995, when Hussain first saw wheelchair rugby he was not convinced he would enjoy it, thinking there was too much wheelchair contact. A year later, he gave it a try for fun and to regain fitness, after a few training sessions he was attracted to the sport because of its speed and competitive element, and from then on he decided to commit and dedicate himself to the sport.

In 1997, Hussain first started competing in wheelchair rugby during treatment at Stoke Mandeville. He won a gold medal when he played in his first major tournament at the National Championships in Stoke Mandeville.

From 2007 and 2008, Hussain studied at the Talented Athlete Scholarship Scheme.

In 2008, he was part of the Great Britain team that finished fourth in the Summer Paralympic Games in Beijing. Afterward, Hussain considered retiring from the game.

In September 2010, he was part of the Great Britain team that finished fifth at the World Wheelchair Rugby Championships in Canada. They won three games and lost four games. In 2011, Great Britain won silver at the European Championships.

In May 2012, Hussain was named by The British Paralympic Association in its 11-strong Paralympics GB wheelchair rugby team. Great Britain finished fifth in the 2012 Summer Paralympic Games in Beijing.

In October 2015, Hussain was in the BT World Wheelchair Rugby Challenge. In May 2016, he was named by The British Paralympic Association in its 11-strong Paralympics GB wheelchair rugby team. Great Britain finished fifth in the 2016 Summer Paralympics Games.

Hussain plays for the Kent Crusaders and plays mostly in a defensive role on court.

== Awards ==
In April 2012, Hussain was awarded the Sports Award at the Channel S Awards.

== Personal life ==
Hussain lives in Whitechapel, London, England. His sporting inspiration is Muhammad Ali, whom he describes as the "ultimate competitor".

In March 2013, along with a three-year-old orphan, Tonbir, Hussain officially unveiled Tower Hamlets Council's "Catch. Don't Pass" campaign at the Town Hall in Canary Wharf.

== Honours ==
Year	Event	Venue	Result
2006	World Championships	Christchurch, New Zealand	4th
2008	Summer Paralympic Games	Beijing, China	4th
2010	World Championships	Vancouver, Canada	5th
2011	European Championships	Notwill, Switzerland	Silver
2012	Summer Paralympic Games	London, England	5th

== See also ==
- British Bangladeshi
- List of British Bangladeshis
- Great Britain national wheelchair rugby team
- Wheelchair rugby at the 2008 Summer Paralympics
- Wheelchair rugby at the 2012 Summer Paralympics
- Wheelchair rugby at the 2016 Summer Paralympics
