= Great Britain national wheelchair rugby team =

Wheel chair rugby team

Great Britain (United Kingdom) GBR
- IWRF Ranking: 5th
- IWRF Zone: IWRF European
- National Federation: Great Britain Wheelchair Rugby
- Coach: (United Kingdom) Jem Akpinar

Paralympic Games
- Appearances: 5
- Medals: Gold 2020

World Championships
- Appearances: 5
- Medals: –

IWRF European Championship
- Appearances: 11
- Medals: (gold) Gold: 1995, 2003, 2005, 2007, 2015, 2017,2019; (silver) Silver: 1997, 2011,2022,2023; (bronze) Bronze: 1999,2013

Uniforms
Red	Blue

The Great Britain national wheelchair rugby team represents Great Britain in international wheelchair rugby. Great Britain is the most successful team in European competition, winning six gold medals at the European Championship and a gold at the 2020 Paralympic Games. Since a national poll as part of The Last Leg, the team have been known as The Sweet Chariots.

== Paralympics ==
Great Britain has competed in every wheelchair rugby tournament at the Paralympic Games, first when it was a demonstration sport in 1996, then since it entered the official program in 2000. Since Great Britain was the host of the 2012 Summer Paralympics in London, they qualified automatically for the wheelchair rugby event, as they were ranked on the IWRF Wheelchair Rugby World Ranking List

== Roster ==
The squad selected for the 2026 World Championships is as follows:

#	Class	Name	Year Born	Team	Notes
11	2.0	Kieran Flynn	1992	(United Kingdom) West Coast WRC	
4	2.0	Gavin Walker	1983	(United Kingdom) Leicester Tigers WRC	Captain
15	2.5	Josh Williams	-	(United Kingdom) West Coast WRC	
2	0.5	Jonathan Coggan	1983	(United Kingdom) London WRC	
7	1.5	Harri Jenkins	1996	(United Kingdom) West Coast WRC	
23	3.5	Faye West	-	(United Kingdom) Leicester Tigers WRC	
20	0.5	Muhammad Islam	-	(United Kingdom) West Coast WRC	
10	3.5	Tyler Walker	2003	(United Kingdom) Cheltenham Tigers WRC	
1	3.5	Oliver Wightman	-	(United Kingdom) West Coast WRC/ Penrith Pumas WRC	
3	3.5	Stuart Robinson	1982	(United Kingdom) West Coast WRC	
5	0.5	Jack Smith	1991	(United Kingdom) North East Bulls WRC	
21	3	Hannah Bucys	-	(United Kingdom) West Coast WRC	

== Competitive record ==
=== Paralympic Games ===
Paralympic Games results
Year	Position	Pld	W	L
(Australia) 2000	6th	5	2	3
(Greece) 2004	4th	6	4	2
(China) 2008	4th	5	2	3
(United Kingdom) 2012	5th	5	3	2
(Brazil) 2016	5th	4	2	2
(Japan) 2020	1st	5	4	1
(France) 2024	4th	5	3	2
Total		35	20	15

=== IWRF World championship ===
Year	Position	Pld	W	L
(Switzerland) 1995	4th	9	3	6
(Canada) 1998	7th	?	?	?
(Sweden) 2002	5th	7	5	2
(New Zealand) 2006	4th	7	5	2
(Canada) 2010	6th	7	3	4
(Denmark) 2014	5th	7	5	2
(Australia) 2018	4th	7	4	3
(Denmark) 2022	7th	7	4	3
(Brazil) 2026	4th	7	5	2
Total		51	29	22

== Past rosters ==
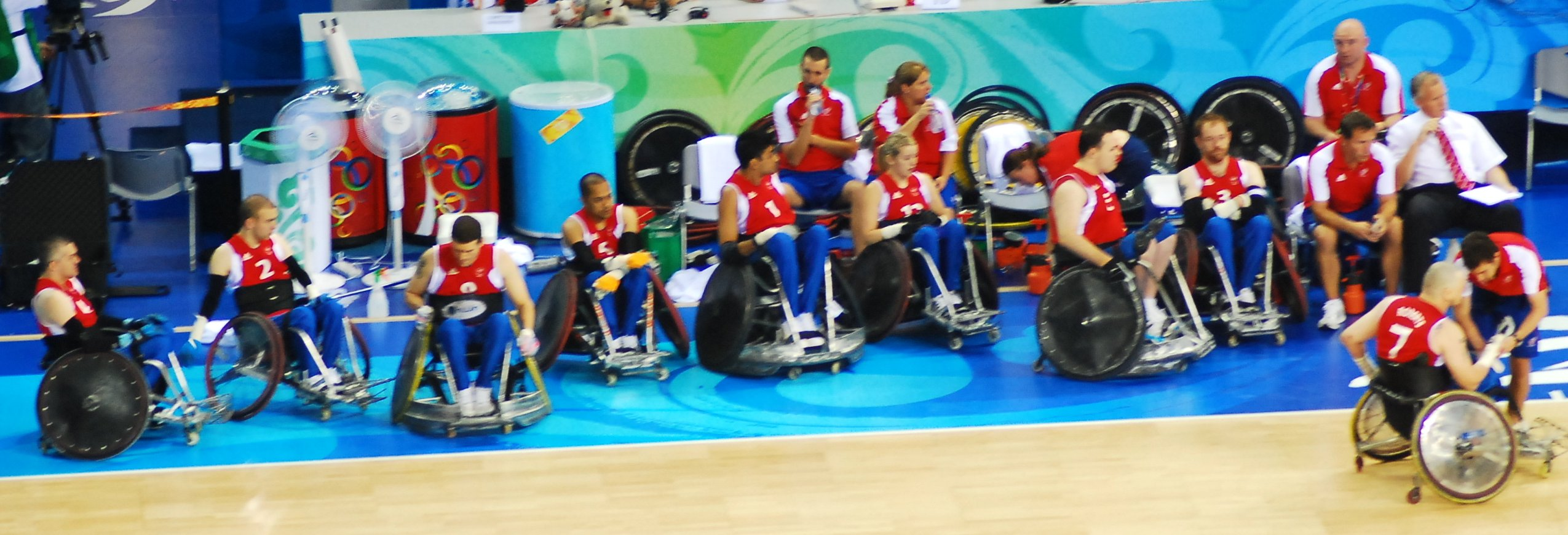
The Great Britain players at the 2008 Paralympics in Beijing.

- 1996 Paralympic Games: Roy Humphreys, Alan Ash, Paul Jenkins, Jeffery Davey, Mark Eccleston, Rob Tarr, Darren Ransome, Keith Jones
- 2000 Paralympic Games: Simon Chambers, Troye Collins, Keith Jones, Graham Kamaly-Asl, Bob O'Shea, Ian Prescott, Darren Ransome, Paul Shaw, Mike Spence, Tony Stackhouse, Rob Tarr
- 2004 Paralympic Games: Andy Barrow, Jonathan Coggan, Troye Collins, Justin Frishberg, Ross Morrison, Bob O'Shea, Steve Palmer, Jason Roberts, Paul Shaw, Tony Stackhouse, Rob Tarr
- 2008 Paralympic Games: Alan Ash, Andy Barrow, Jonathan Coggan, Troye Collins, Justin Frishberg, Bulbul Hussain, Ross Morrison, Steven Palmer, Josie Pearson, Jason Roberts, Mandip Sehmi, Paul Shaw, Coach: Mark Edward O'Connor
- 2012 Paralympic Games: David Anthony, Andy Barrow, Steve Brown (captain), Jonathan Coggan, Kylie Grimes, Bulbul Hussain, Mike Kerr, Ross Morrison, Myles Pearson, Aaron Phipps, Mandip Sehmi, Coach: Tom O'Connor
- 2016 Paralympic Games: Alan Ash, Coral Batey, Ayaz Bhuta, Ryan Cowling, Jonathan Coggan, Bulbul Hussain, Mike Kerr, Jim Roberts, Chris Ryan, Mandip Sehmi, Jamie Stead, Gavin Walker, Coach: Paul Shaw
- 2020 Paralympic Games: Ayaz Bhuta, Jonathan Coggan, Ryan Cowling, Nicholas Cummins, Kylie Grimes, Aaron Phipps, Jim Roberts, Stuart Robinson, Chris Ryan, Jack Smith, Jamie Stead, Gavin Walker, Coach: Paul Shaw
- 2024 Paralympic Games: Jonathan Coggan, Dan Kellett, Nicholas Cummins, Aaron Phipps, Stuart Robinson, Jack Smith, David Ross, Jamie Stead, Gavin Walker, Kieran Flynn, Ollie Mangion, Tyler Walker, Coach: Paul Shaw
