= Jonathan Coggan =

British wheelchair rugby player

Jonathan Coggan MBE
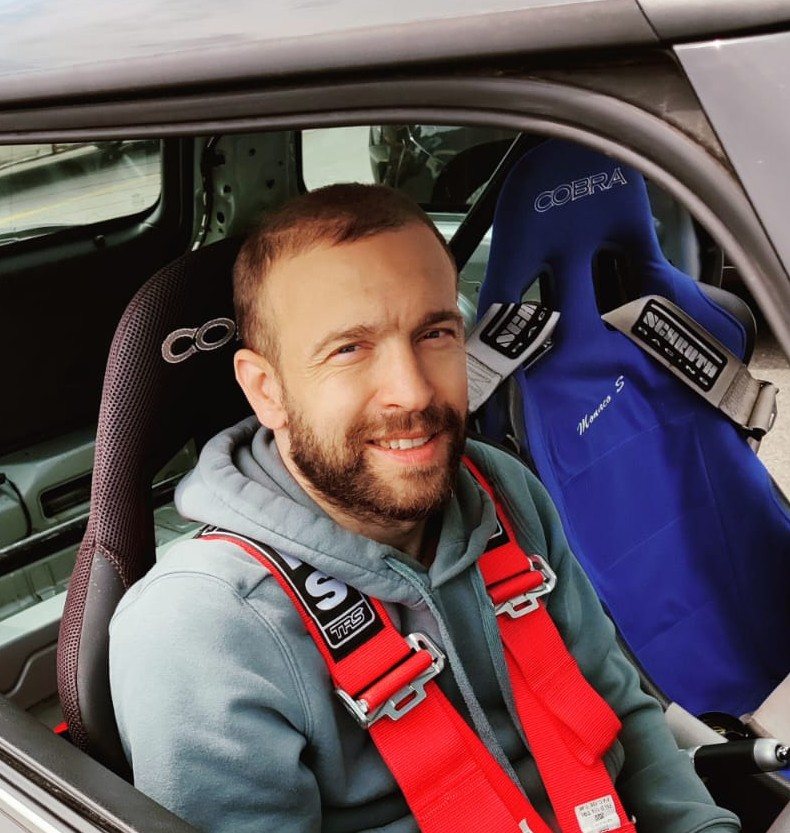
- Coggan in 2023

Personal information
- Born: 25 April 1983 (age 43) Essex, England

Sport
- Sport: Wheelchair rugby
- Disability class: 0.5
- Club: London Wheelchair Rugby Club
- Team: Great Britain (2002–current)
Medal record
Paralympic Games
Gold medal – first place	2020 Tokyo	Mixed
European Championships
Gold medal – first place	2005 Middelfart	Mixed
Gold medal – first place	2007 Espoo	Mixed
Silver medal – second place	2011 Nottwil	Mixed
Bronze medal – third place	2013 Antwerp	Mixed
Gold medal – first place	2015 Nastola	Mixed
Gold medal – first place	2017 Koblenz	Mixed
Gold medal – first place	2019 Vejle	Mixed
Silver medal – second place	2022 Paris	Mixed
Silver medal – second place	2023 Cardiff	Mixed
Bronze medal – third place	2025 The Hague	Mixed

Jonathan Coggan MBE (born 25 April 1983), nicknamed "Jonny", is a British wheelchair rugby player. He has represented Great Britain at six consecutive Paralympic Games.

In 2021, he won the gold medal for Great Britain at the 2020 Summer Paralympics, competing in the mixed event in the wheelchair rugby tournament.

== Life and career ==
At the age of 16, Coggan discovered wheelchair rugby during his time at Stoke Mandeville Hospital, following a car crash that left him with a spinal injury. Formerly a keen footballer, he was introduced to a range of parasports, and rugby provided the team sport he wanted as well as being a contact sport.

By the time he was 21, Coggan had been selected for the Great Britain national wheelchair rugby team and made his first Paralympic appearance at the 2004 Summer Paralympics in Athens, where Great Britain (GB) lost the bronze medal match to the United States. Since then, he has been a constant presence in the team, helping GB to win multiple European championship medals as well as Paralympic gold in 2021. He is one of the most experienced athletes in wheelchair rugby and currently has almost 300 international caps.

In 2013, Coggan handcycled 400km across South Africa's Western Cape, and raised over £1700 for the charity Regain.

Coggan was appointed Member of the Order of the British Empire (MBE) in the 2022 New Year Honours for services to wheelchair rugby. In the same year, he was inducted into the Stoke Mandeville Hall of Fame.
