= Aaron Phipps =

Aaron Phipps MBE
- Born: Aaron Phipps; 7 April 1983 (age 43) Southampton, Totton

Rugby union career
- Position: -
International career
Years	Team	Apps	(Points)
- Great Britain
Medal record
Representing Great Britain
Paralympic Games
Wheelchair rugby
Gold medal – first place	2020 Tokyo	Wheelchair Rugby

Aaron David Phipps (born 7 April 1983) was a British wheelchair rugby player and gold medal-winning paralympian.

He was part of the Great Britain national wheelchair rugby team and competed in Wheelchair rugby at the 2012 Summer Paralympics in London and in at the 2020 Tokyo Paralympics where the team won the gold medal final on 29 August 2021.

== Biography ==
On 7 January 1999 Aaron contracted Meningitis C. and Meningococcal sepsis. As a result of this illness Aaron was in a controlled coma for 2 weeks. Following this, in March, it was required that his legs and most of his fingers be amputated. In total Aaron spent a year in hospital, receiving treatment and recovering.

In 2007 Aaron began to get involved in wheelchair races and raised money for a Meningitis charity by completing a 10 km race in Totton. He has also completed 2 London Marathons (2008 & 2009) and in 2009 was ranked 4th UK Male in both the London Marathon and the Adidas Silverstone Half Marathon.

On 23 May 2016 Phipps became the first disabled British person to scale Mount Kilimanjaro During large parts of the ascent Phipps was forced to climb on his hands and knees because the wheelchair wasn't capable of traversing the difficult terrain but was able to complete the climb without any assistance.

He was told that he had to be carried up the mountain, but he refused. When climbing the mountain it took twice the time it was predicted to take. On the third day, the wheelchair wasn't capable of traversing up the mountain anymore and so Aaron decided to use knee pads in order to be able to reach the top, with his father carrying the wheelchair.

Phipps was appointed Member of the Order of the British Empire (MBE) in the 2022 New Year Honours for services to wheelchair rugby.
