= Bob O'Shea =

British wheelchair rugby player

- Born: 3 July 1960 (age 66)

Rugby union career
- Position: -
International career
Years	Team	Apps	(Points)
- Great Britain

Bob O'Shea (born 3 July 1960) is a British former wheelchair rugby captain of the Great Britain national wheelchair rugby team.

He was the captain of the team that came in 6th place at the 2000 Summer Paralympics. He was also on the team for the 4th place at the 2004 Summer Paralympics.

In 1998, on his 28th birthday, he broke his neck while diving into a pool.
