= Andy Barrow =

British wheelchair rugby player

Personal information
- Full name: Andrew John Barrow
- Nationality: British
- Born: 20 August 1979 (age 46) New Eltham, London, England
- Website: www.andybarrow.co.uk

Sport
- Sport: Wheelchair Rugby
- Team: (United Kingdom) Great Britain
- Retired: October 2012

Achievements and titles
- Paralympic finals: 4th 2004, 4th (Captain) 2008, 5th 2012
- World finals: 5th place, Sweden 2002, 4th place New Zealand 2006 (Captain), 5th place, Canada 2010
- Regional finals: European Gold, Belgium 2003, European Gold, Denmark 2005 (Captain), European Gold, Finland 2007 (Captain), 4th place, Denmark 2009 (Captain), European Silver, Switzerland 2011 IWRF European Championship
- Updated on 20 January 2013

Andy Barrow (born 20 August 1979) is an international speaker and mentor and a retired Great Britain wheelchair rugby player.

Barrow's wheelchair rugby career encompassed three Paralympic Games, three World Championships, and five European Championships, where his team won three consecutive gold medals. He was captain of the British team from 2005 to 2010 and played for San Diego in the US league.

In 1997, Barrow was playing rugby for his local club when he suffered a spinal cord injury that left him a quadriplegic. He was aged just 17.

One year later, in 1998, Barrow started his wheelchair rugby career, joining London Wheelchair Rugby Club.

After retiring from elite sport, Andy became a motivational speaker and mentor. He helped introduce the Athlete Inspiration Programme to schools in his home town of Greenwich to help keep the momentum following the success of London 2012 and encourage children to stay physically active.

He has developed a project with Chaucer Insurance to increase confidence and opportunities for children with learning difficulties in London and Kent.

Andy has also expanded his work internationally. In March 2017 he visited Japan to spread the word about disability sport and wheelchair rugby ahead of the Olympic and Paralympic Games in Tokyo in 2020 at a British Camber of Commerce event.

Andy also visits international schools delivering workshops on commitment, determination, teamwork, overcoming adversity and nutrition.

He has helped the newly formed Singapore wheelchair rugby team and gave a demonstration of the game in Hong Kong alongside his ambassadorial role at the Hong Kong 7s tournament.

Andy is also a Director for volunteer charity Imago.
