= IWRF European Championship =

International wheelchair rugby event

- Formerly: IWAS European Championship
- Sport: Wheelchair rugby
- No. of teams: 8
- Continent: IWRF European (Europe)
- Most recent champion: France (3)
- Most titles: Great Britain (7)

The IWRF European Championship or IWRF European Zone Championship is the European wheelchair rugby championships that take place every two years between national teams of the continents. The European Championship is also a qualifying tournament for the IWRF World Championships and the Paralympic Games.

The first European Championship was held in 1995.

== Summaries ==
Year	Host	Gold medal game			Bronze medal game		
Year	Host	Gold	Score	Silver	Bronze	Score	Fourth place
1995; Details	Sweden (Gothenburg)	Great Britain	–	Sweden	Netherlands	–	Germany
1997; Details	Netherlands (Nijmegen)	Sweden	31–23	Great Britain	Germany	42–31	Netherlands
1999; Details	Switzerland (Nottwil)	Sweden	–	Germany	Great Britain	–	Switzerland
2003; Details	Belgium (Lommel)	Great Britain	32–31	Belgium	Germany	27–25	Denmark
2005; Details	Denmark (Middelfart)	Great Britain	28–26	Germany	Sweden	31–30	Denmark
2007; Details	Finland (Espoo)	Great Britain	28–26	Germany	Sweden	31–30	Belgium
2009; Details	Denmark (Hillerød)	Belgium	49–46	Sweden	Germany	47–43	Great Britain
2011; Details	Switzerland (Nottwil)	Sweden	49–42	Great Britain	Belgium	52–51	France
2013; Details	Belgium (Antwerp)	Sweden	49–48	Denmark	Great Britain	56–43	Germany
2015; Details	Finland (Nastola)	Great Britain	49-48	Sweden	Denmark	56-48	Germany
2017; Details	Germany (Koblenz)	Great Britain	49-41	Sweden	France	53-48	Denmark
2019; Details	Denmark (Vejle)	Great Britain	55-45	Denmark	France	45-43	Sweden
2022; Details	France (Paris)	France	44-43	Great Britain	Denmark	58-52	Germany
2023; Details	Wales (Cardiff)	France	55-49	Great Britain	Denmark	53-50	Germany
2025; Details	Netherlands (Den Haag)	France	53-49	Denmark	Great Britain	43-37	Germany

=== Championships per nation ===
Rank	Nation	Gold	Silver	Bronze	Total
1	Great Britain	7	4	3	14
2	Sweden	4	4	2	10
3	France	3	0	2	5
4	Belgium	1	1	1	3
5	Denmark	0	3	3	6
5	Germany	0	3	3	6
7	Netherlands	0	0	1	1
Totals (7 entries)		15	15	15	45

== Participation details ==
Team	(Sweden) 1995	(Netherlands) 1997	(Switzerland) 1999	(Belgium) 2003	(Denmark) 2005	(Finland) 2007	(Denmark) 2009	(Switzerland) 2011	(Belgium) 2013	(Finland) 2015	(Germany) 2017	(Denmark) 2019	(France) 2022	(Wales) 2023	(Netherlands) 2025
Austria		6th	7th	8th	8th	9th	8th	9th	10th	–	–	–	–	–	–
Belgium		5th	5th	2nd	5th	4th	1st	3rd	5th	8th	–	–	–	–	–
Czech Republic		10th	12th	–	–	11th	11th	–	12th	–	–	–	–	8th	–
Denmark		9th	9th	4th	4th	10th	9th	7th	2nd	3rd	4th	2nd	3rd	3rd	2nd
Finland		8th	8th	9th	9th	6th	6th	8th	6th	7th	8th	–	–	–	–
France		–	–	–	–	–	–	4th	7th	5th	3rd	3rd	1st	1st	1st
Germany	4th	3rd	2nd	3rd	2nd	2nd	3rd	6th	4th	4th	6th	5th	4th	4th	4th
Great Britain	1st	2nd	3rd	1st	1st	1st	4th	2nd	3rd	1st	1st	1st	2nd	2nd	3rd
Ireland		–	–	11th	12th	12th	10th	11th	–	6th	7th	–	–	–	–
Israel		–	–	–	–	–	–	–	–	–	–	–	–	7th	–
Italy		–	–	–	–	–	–	–	11th	–	–	–	–	–	–
Netherlands	3rd	4th	6th	6th	7th	8th	12th	12th	–	–	–	6th	7th	6th	5th
Norway		–	11th	12th	11th	–	–	–	–	–	–	–	–	–	–
Poland		–	10th	10th	10th	7th	5th	5th	9th	–	5th	8th	8th	–	8th
Russia		–	–	–	–	–	–	–	–	–	–	–	6th	–	–
Sweden	2nd	1st	1st	5th	3rd	3rd	2nd	1st	1st	2nd	2nd	4th	–	–	7th
Switzerland		7th	4th	7th	6th	5th	7th	10th	8th	–	–	7th	5th	5th	6th

== See also ==
- Wheelchair Rugby World Championships
- IWRF Americas Championship
- IWRF Asia-Oceania Championship
- European Championships
